= List of Italian football transfers summer 2008 (August) =

This is a list of Italian football transfers, for the 2008–09 season, from and to Serie A and Serie B.

== Summer transfer window (August) ==
Date	Name	Nationality	Moving from	Moving to	Fee
2008-08-01	Renato Ricci	Italy	Internazionale (youth)	Vicenza (youth)	Loan
2008-08-01	José Mamede	Portugal	Genoa	Potenza	Loan
2008-08-01	Tiago Pires	Portugal	Genoa	Potenza	Loan
2008-08-01	Jean Mbida	Italy	Vicenza	Internazionale	Co-ownership, €60,000
2008-08-01	Nicola Silvestri	Italy	Genoa	Piacenza	Free
2008-08-01	Nicola Silvestri	Italy	Piacenza	Lumezzane	Loan
2008-08-01	Matteo Mandorlini	Italy	Parma	Foligno	Co-ownership, undisclosed
2008-08-01	Andrea Alberti	Italy	Brescia	Monza	Co-ownership, undisclosed
2008-08-04	Matías Miramontes	Argentina	(Argentina) Gimnasia de Jujuy	Ancona	Undisclosed
2008-08-04	Silvano Raggio Garibaldi	Italy	Genoa	Pisa	Loan
2008-08-04	Giuseppe Greco	Italy	Genoa	Pisa	Loan
2008-08-05	Felice Natalino	Italy	Genoa (youth)	Internazionale (youth)	Loan
	Mario Titone	Italy	Pisa	Sassuolo	Free
2008-08-05	Mario Titone	Italy	Sassuolo	Sambenedettese	Co-ownership, undisclosed
2008-08-06	Ivan Reali	Italy	Internazionale (youth)	Vicenza (youth)	Loan
2008-08-07	Stefano Lorenzi	Italy	Treviso	SPAL	Free
2008-08-07	Giovanni Marchese	Italy	Chievo	Salernitana	Loan
2008-08-07	Andrea Mengoni	Italy	Chievo	Piacenza	Loan
2008-08-08	Gianluca Pegolo	Italy	Genoa	Parma	Loan
2008-08-08	Eugenio Lamanna	Italy	Como	Genoa	Undisclosed
2008-08-08	Mattia Perin	Italy	Pistoiese	Genoa	Undisclosed
2008-08-08	Radek Petr	Czech Republic	Parma	Pro Patria	Loan
2008-08-11	João Paulo Fernando Marangon	Brazil	Roma	Virtus Lanciano	Loan
2008-08-11	Mike Tullberg	Denmark	Reggina	(Scotland) Hearts	Loan
2008-08-12	Roberto Colussi	Italy	Sassuolo	Lanciano	Undisclosed
2008-08-12	Andrea Torta	Italy	Juventus	Rovigo	Loan
2008-08-12	Steve Pinau	France	Genoa	(Scotland) Hibernian	Loan
12 August 2008	Wilson	Brazil	Genoa	(Brazil) Sport Recife	Loan
13 August 2008	Domenico Di Cecco	Italy	Chievo	Avellino	Loan
2008-08-13	Paolo Campinoti	Italy	Internazionale (youth)	Monza (youth)	Loan
2008-08-13	Gianluigi Bianco	Italy	Sampdoria	Empoli	Co-ownership, undisclosed
2008-08-14	Fabrizio Di Bella	Italy	Potenza	Livorno (remains at Potenza)	Undisclosed
2008-08-14	Stefano Fortunato	Italy	Montecchio Maggiore (amateur)	Parma (youth)	Loan
2008-08-18	Alessandro Noselli	Italy	Mantova	Sassuolo	Undisclosed
2008-08-18	Umberto Eusepi	Italy	Genoa (youth)	Ancona	Loan
2008-08-19	Andrea Cocco	Italy	Cagliari	Rovigo	Co-ownership, undisclosed
2009-08-20	Umberto Bellani	Italy	Internazionale (youth)	Sassuolo (youth)	Loan
2008-08-20	Giorgio Schiavini	Italy	Internazionale	Sassuolo (youth)	Loan
2008-08-20	Raffaele Dalle Vedove	Italy	Noventa (youth)	Internazionale (youth)	Undisclosed
2008-08-20	Cristian Daminuţă	Romania	(Romania) Timișoara	Internazionale	Undisclosed
2008-08-20	Gaetano Carrieri	Italy	Pomigliano (amateur)	Livorno	Free
2008-08-20	Gaetano Carrieri	Italy	Livorno	Manfredonia	Co-ownership, undisclosed
2008-08-21	Pablo Granoche	Uruguay	Triestina	Chievo	Co-ownership, €400,000
2008-08-21	Massimo Margiotta		Frosinone	Vicenza	Undisclosed
2008-08-21	Joelson		Reggina	Pisa	Loan
2008-08-21	Matteo Piccinni		Udinese	Pisa	Loan
2008-08-22	Nicolás Bremec	Uruguay	Unattached	Foggia	
2008-08-22	Joe Bizera	Uruguay	Cagliari	(Greece) PAOK	Undisclosed
2008-08-24	Cristian Pasquato	Italy	Juventus (youth)	Empoli	Loan
2008-08-25	Leandro Antonio Martínez	Italy	Parma	Ternana	Loan
2008-08-25	Raffaele Nolè	Italy	Rimini	Potenza	Loan
2008-08-25	Giuseppe Lolaico	Italy	Rimini	Potenza	Loan
2008-08-25	Antonino Bonvissuto	Italy	Bari	Cittadella	Loan
2008-08-25	Mattia Piras	Italy	Pergocrema (youth)	AlbinoLeffe (youth)	Loan
2008-08-26	Massimiliano Pesenti	Italy	AlbinoLeffe	Lumezzane	Loan
2008-08-26	Andriy Shevchenko	Ukraine	(England) Chelsea	Milan	Loan
2008-08-26	Alessandro Ferri	Italy	Mantova	Pisa	Free
2008-08-27	Andrea Vignali	Italy	Spezia (youth)	Sassuolo (youth)	Free
2008-08-27	Davide Luppi	Italy	Bologna (youth)	Sassuolo (youth)	Loan
2008-08-28	Alessio Sestu	Italy	Treviso	Reggina	Undisclosed (co-owned with Avellino)
2008-08-28	Mattia Graffiedi	Italy	Triestina	Piacenza	Undisclosed
2008-08-28	Generoso Rossi	Italy	Triestina	Gallipoli	Undisclosed
2008-08-28	Ettore Marchi	Italy	Triestina	Bellaria Igea Marina	Loan
2008-08-28	Renan Pippi	Italy	Triestina	Sambenedettese	Loan
2008-08-28	Cristian Agnelli	Italy	Lecce	Sorrento	Loan
2008-08-28	Matteo Bruscagin	Italy	Milan	Monza	Loan
2008-08-28	Simone Missiroli	Italy	Reggina	Treviso	Loan
2008-08-28	Carmine Coppola	Italy	Messina	Frosinone	Free
2008-08-29	Salvatore Caturano	Italy	Empoli (youth)	Taranto	Loan
2008-08-29	Zsolt Tamási	Hungary	Cisco Roma (youth)	Triestina (youth)	Loan
2008-08-29	Nicola Ciotola	Italy	Pisa	Avellino	Co-ownership, undisclosed
2008-08-29	Omar Torri	Italy	AlbinoLeffe	Monza	Loan
2008-08-29	Mattia Desole	Italy	(Switzerland) Grasshopper	Internazionale	undisclosed
2008-08-29	Pellegrino Albanese	Italy	Internazionale	Sassuolo	Loan
2008-08-29	Salvatore Papa	Italy	Internazionale	Triestina	Loan
2008-08-29	Rivaldo	Paraguay	Genoa	SPAL	Co-ownership, €500
2008-08-30	Nicola Sartori	Italy	Internazionale	Portogruaro	Loan
2008-08-31	Túlio de Melo	Brazil	Palermo	(France) Lille	€4M
2008-09-01	Paolo Carbonaro	Italy	Palermo	Monopoli	Loan
2008-09-01	Daniel Mensah	Ghana	Palermo	(Switzerland) Bellinzona	Undisclosed
2008-09-01	Angelo Siniscalchi	Italy	Ascoli	Pescara	Loan
2008-09-01	Kerlon	Brazil	(Brazil) Cruzeiro	Chievo	Free
2008-09-01	Mario Yepes		(France) Paris Saint-Germain	Chievo	Free
2008-09-01	Mirco Gasparetto		Chievo	Pisa	Loan
2008-09-01	Pablo Granoche		Chievo	Triestina	Loan
2008-09-01	Santiago Morero		Tigre (Argentina)	Chievo	Undisclosed
2008-09-01	Mauro Esposito		Roma	Chievo	Loan
2008-09-01	Roberto Colacone		AlbinoLeffe	Ancona	Undisclosed
2008-09-01	Luca Ceccarelli	Italy	Milan	Verona	Undisclosed
2008-09-01	Marcello Cottafava	Italy	Lecce	Triestina	Undisclosed
2008-09-01	Davide Succi	Italy	Ravenna	Palermo	Co-ownership, €1.75M
2008-09-01	Mirko Eramo	Italy	Sampdoria	Piacenza	Loan
2008-09-01	Emanuele Ferraro	Italy	Salernitana	Piacenza	Loan
2008-09-01	Cesare Rickler	Italy	Chievo	Piacenza	Loan
2008-09-01	Lucas Simon	Argentina	Piacenza	Pescara	Loan
2008-09-01	Marcelo Larrondo	Argentina	(Uruguay) Progreso	Siena	Loan
2008-09-01	Vincenzo Pepe	Italy	Pescara	Avellino	Undisclosed
2008-09-01	Massimo Coda	Italy	Bologna	Cremonese	Loan
2008-09-01	Marco Paoloni	Italy	Ascoli	Udinese	Free
2008-09-01	Marco Paoloni	Italy	Udinese	Cremonese	Co-ownership, undisclosed
2008-09-01	Ilario Aloe	Italy	Internazionale	Ascoli	Co-ownership, undisclosed
2008-09-01	Victor	Brazil	Pescara	Lecce	Loan
2008-09-01	Thomas Job	Cameroon	Ascoli	Pisa	Undisclosed
2008-09-01	Carlo Luisi	Italy	Pisa	Ascoli	Undisclosed
2008-09-01	Andrea Catellani	Italy	Catania	Modena	Loan
2008-09-01	Albin Hodza	France	Udinese	Manfredonia	Loan
2008-09-01	Josias Basso	Brazil	(Brazil) Grêmio São José	Reggina	Undisclosed
2008-09-01	Matteo Guardalben	Italy	Vicenza	Treviso	Undisclosed
2008-09-01	Marco Turati	Italy	Cesena	Ancona	Loan
2008-09-01	Mohamadou Sissoko	France	Udinese	Gallipoli	Loan
2008-09-01	Enrico Cotza	Italy	Cagliari	Foligno	Loan
2008-09-01	Cristiano Del Grosso	Italy	Cagliari	Siena	Loan
2008-09-01	Vincenzo Marruocco	Italy	Cagliari	Cavese	Free
2008-09-01	Salvatore Aronica	Italy	Reggina	Napoli	€2.675M
2008-09-01	Maurizio Domizzi	Italy	Napoli	Udinese	Co-ownership, €2.5M
2008-09-01	Roberto De Zerbi	Italy	Napoli	Avellino	Loan
2008-09-01	Luca Lacrimini	Italy	Napoli	Cavese	Free
2008-09-01	Gaetano Grieco	Italy	Napoli	Juve Stabia	Undisclosed
2008-09-01	Nicola Pagani	Italy	Frosinone	Perugia	Undisclosed
2008-09-01	Zsolt Bognár	Hungary	Frosinone	Lanciano	Undisclosed
2008-09-01	Michele Ischia	Italy	Frosinone	Cavese	Loan
2008-09-01	Massimiliano Carlini	Italy	Frosinone	Lecco	Loan
2008-09-01	Andrea Paolucci	Italy	Fiorentina	Taranto	Loan
2008-09-01	Paolo Marchi	Italy	Internazionale (youth)	Chievo (youth)	Loan
2008-09-01	Nestor Djengoue	Cameroon	Internazionale (youth)	Chievo (youth)	Free
2008-09-01	Davide Carcuro	Italy	Fiorentina	Treviso	Loan (between co-owner)
2008-09-01	Patrick D'Aguanno	Italy	Trapani	Chievo	Free
2008-09-01	Patrick D'Aguanno	Italy	Chievo	Potenza	Co-ownership, €500
2008-09-01	Corrado Colombo	Italy	Pisa	Bari	Undisclosed
2008-09-01	Manuel Nocciolini	Italy	Fiorentina (youth)	Cuoiopelli Cappiano	Loan
2008-09-01	Nicola Dal Bosco	Italy	Vicenza	Lumezzane	Loan

== Summer transfer window (date unknown) ==
Date	Name	Moving from	Moving to	Fee
	Daniele Simoncelli	Brescia (youth)	Olbia	Loan
	Fabio Franceschini	Lecce (youth)	Giacomense	Undisclosed
	Alessio Ambrogetti	Cesena (youth)	Valenzana	Loan
	Matteo Merini	Lazio	Melfi	Loan
	Federico Conti	Catania (youth)	Cuoiopelli Cappiano	Loan
	Nebil Caidi	Cesena	Valenzana	Loan
	Pietro Lorenzini	Parma (youth)	Bellaria	Loan
	Marco Zentil	Vicenza	Alghero	Loan
	Ivan Merli Sala	Treviso	Viterbese	?
	Mirko Martucci	Genoa	SPAL	Co-ownership, €500
	Aniello Panariello	Empoli	Giacomense	Co-ownership, undisclosed
	Simone Malacarne	Milan	Pizzighettone	?
	Mariano González	Palermo	(Portugal) Porto	€3.2M
	Antonio Mirante	Juventus	Sampdoria	Co-ownership, €1.5M
	Franco Brienza	Palermo	Reggina	€2.2M
	Ronny Toma	Internazionale	Solbiatese Arno	Free
	Marco Varaldi	Milan	Vigor Lamezia	Free
	Samon Reider Rodríguez	Juventus	Poggibonsi	Loan
	David Enrique Mateo	Fiorentina	Lecco	Loan
	Antonio Rizzo	Reggina	Cremonese	Loan
	Juri Toppan	Udinese (youth)	(Switzerland) Chaux-de-Fonds (youth)	Undisclosed
	Angelo Bencivenga	Empoli (youth)	(Switzerland) Chaux-de-Fonds (youth)	Undisclosed
	Francesco Checcucci	Prato	Chievo	Undisclosed
	Alessandro Salvi	AlbinoLeffe	Prato	Loan
	Pedro Obiang	Atlético Madrid (Spain)	Sampdoria	Undisclosed, youth
	Antonio Esposito	Spezia	Internazionale	Free
	Matteo Prandelli	Siena	Valle del Giovenco	Loan
	Michele Franco	Bari	Como	Co-ownership, undisclosed
	Alex Valentini	Mantova	Sambonifacese	Co-ownership, undisclosed
	Nicolò Antonelli	Genoa	Virtus Entella	Loan
	Daniele Fiorentino	Bari	Venezia	Loan
	Roberto Magliocco	Salernitana	Nocerina	Free
	Andrea Pozzato	Juventus	Canavese	Co-ownership, undisclosed
	Maycol Andriani	Chievo	Sambonifacese	Co-ownership, undisclosed
	Alessio Lanotte	Internazionale	Benevento	Undisclosed
	Marco Puntoriere	Internazionale	Benevento	Loan
	Andrea Mancini	Internazionale (youth)	Monza (youth)	Loan
	Domenico Maiese	Internazionale (youth)	Monza (youth)	Loan

== Out of window transfer ==
Date	Name	Nat	Moving from	Moving to	Fee
2008-09-06	Álvaro Recoba	Uruguay	Internazionale	(Greece) Panionios	Free
2008-09-09	Cristiano Lupatelli	Italy	Fiorentina	Cagliari	Free
2008-09-14	Thiago Motta	Brazil	(Spain) Atlético Madrid	Genoa	Free
2008-09-16	Fabio Gatti	Italy	Modena	Perugia	Free
2008-09-18	Gaetano Grieco	Italy	Napoli	Juve Stabia	Free
2008-09-18	Marco Capparella	Italy	Napoli	Juve Stabia	Free
2008-09-22	Paolo Castelli	Italy	Lucchese	Modena	Free
2008-09-26	Alessandro Doga	Italy	Mantova	Arezzo	Free
2008-10-03	Emanuele Manitta	Italy	Unattached	Siena	Free
2008-10-09	Jess Vanstrattan	Australia	Verona	(Australia) Gold Coast United	Free
2008-10-14	Diego Tristán	Spain	Livorno	(England) West Ham United	Free
2008–10-16	Pedro Oliveira	Portugal	(Romania) CFR Cluj	Modena	Free
2008-10-24	Antonio Ghomsi	Cameroon	Juve Stabia	Avellino	Free
