= Improta =

Improta is an Italian surname. Notable people with the surname include:

- Ciro Improta (born 1991), Italian footballer
- Giancarlo Improta (born 1987), Italian footballer
- Mario Improta (born 1972), known as Marione, Italian cartoonist
- Riccardo Improta (born 1993), Italian footballer
- Umberto Improta (born 1984), Italian footballer
