= Ilyos Zeytulayev =

Uzbek retired footballer (born 1982)

Personal information
- Full name: Ilyos Zeytulayev
- Date of birth: 13 July 1982 (age 44)
- Place of birth: Angren, Tashkent Oblast, Uzbek SSR, Soviet Union
- Height: 1.78 m (5 ft 10 in)
- Positions: Midfielder; forward

Team information
- Current team: Bunyodkor (head coach)

Youth career
- Sportakademklub
- Juventus

Senior career*
Years	Team	Apps	(Gls)
2001–2005	Juventus	0	(0)
2005–2007	Reggina	2	(0)
2006	→ Crotone (loan)	13	(3)
2006–2007	→ Genoa (loan)	12	(0)
2007	→ Vicenza (loan)	6	(0)
2007–2008	Verona	13	(1)
2008–2009	Pescara	28	(7)
2009–2013	Lanciano	52	(1)
2014	Torino	0	(0)
2014	→ HNK Gorica (loan)	6	(0)
2015–2018	Cupello		

International career
2001–2007	Uzbekistan	10	(2)

Managerial career
- 2021–2023: San Salvo
- 2023–2024: Virtus Cupello
- 2024–: Bunyodkor
- * Club domestic league appearances and goals as of 27 November 2011

Ilyos Zeytulayev (Uzbek: Илёс Зейтулаев; born 13 July 1982) is an Uzbek retired footballer who played as a midfielder or as a forward. He is currently the head coach of Uzbekistan Super League club Bunyodkor.

Zeytulayev has spent most of his career in the Italian Serie B and Lega Pro Prima Divisione (formerly Serie C1). His first name is sometimes spelled Illyos, or Ilyas (Cyrillic: Ильяс), the latter of which is the Russian equivalent. Moreover, Zeytulayev is also romanized as Zeytulaev.

== Club career ==
Zeytulayev started his professional career in the Juventus youth teams along with Serhiy Kovalenko and Viktor Budyanskiy, making him the first Uzbekistani player to play in Italy. He signed a 5-year contract on 10 August 2001. He joined Juve permanently in February 2002 along with Kovalenko after a loan from Sportakademklub Moscow, the team he played since he was 13. The Turin club paid US$400,000 (about €454K) to buy the duo's image and registration rights. He also played both legs against Sampdoria in the Coppa Italia 2001–02.

=== Reggina and various loans ===
After graduating from the U20 team in June, along with Viktor Budyanskiy, they were unable to register both as Juve players. At first, FIGC declared that their remaining 2-year contracts did not fulfill the regulations and voided them. The FIGC declared that they had been on youth contracts which could only run for a maximum of 3 years. In addition, a non-EU player at that time could not sign a contract extension. Thus, they were released. However, after an appeal, the appeal community stated that a foreigner could sign a professional contract regardless of his age, and FIGC regulations only protected domestic youth products who can only sign a contract for more than three years after the age of 18. They were transferred to Reggina for €1K to co-own the players in January 2005, He played in his first Serie A match on 19 March 2005, coming on as a substitute for Marco Borriello in the 75th minute against his first club Juve. The match ended in a 0–1 loss. In June 2005, Juventus bought back Budyanskiy for €0.5K, while Reggina signed Zeytulayev permanently for the same price.

After not playing in the 2005–06 Serie A, in January 2006, he was loaned out to Serie B side Crotone. In 2006–07 season, he was loaned out again, this time to Genoa and Vicenza of Serie B (as an exchange with Ivan Castiglia).

=== Lega Pro Prima Divisione ===
In July 2007, he left for Verona of Serie C1. But after a poor season, he left for Pescara on a free transfer. There, he became a regular member of the team. In August 2009, he signed a 3-year contract with Lanciano as a free agent. In his first season, he only made 14 league appearances, but in 2010–11 season, he started a successive five league games for the team, as one of the strikers in a 4-3-3 formation, along with Luís Gabriel Sacilotto to partner with Umberto Improta or Francesco Di Gennaro.

=== Late career ===
In January 2014, Zeytulayev was signed by Torino. However, the signing was aimed solely at exploiting the mechanism of the non-EU signing of the league. On 4 February 2014 Zeytulayev joined Croatian club HNK Gorica in a temporary deal. In the same window Torino signed Marko Vešović from Serbia.

In 2015 he moved back to Italy, joining Eccellenza amateurs Cupello, also becoming a youth coach for the team.

== International career ==
Zeytulayev has been capped for Uzbekistan U20 team in the 2003 FIFA World Youth Championship. He also played for the Uzbekistan national football team in the 2002 FIFA World Cup qualification, 2004 AFC Asian Cup and 2007 AFC Asian Cup qualification. He was named in the squad for friendlies before 2007 AFC Asian Cup in March 2007. In March 2009, he was recalled to national team for the 2010 FIFA World Cup qualification in March 2009 but did not play.

== Coaching career ==
After retiring as a player, Zeytulayev settled down in Abruzzo, the region of origin of his Italian wife, and kept working as a youth coach for Virtus Vasto. In August 2021 he was unveiled as the new head coach of Promozione Abruzzo amateurs San Salvo.

In June 2023, he left San Salvo for Eccellenza Abruzzo club Virtus Cupello. He departed in April 2024 to accept the head coaching position at Uzbekistan Super League club Bunyodkor.

== Career statistics ==
=== International statistics ===
International appearances and goals
App	Date	Venue	Opponent	Result	Goal	Competition
1	7 May 2001	Amman, Jordan	Jordan	1–1	0	2002 FIFA World Cup qualification
2	8 September 2001	Tashkent, Uzbekistan	Oman	5–0	0	2002 FIFA World Cup qualification
3	2002	?				
4	30 April 2003	Tashkent, Uzbekistan	Belarus	1–2	0	Friendly
5	22 July 2004	Chengdu, China (PRC)	Saudi Arabia	1–0	0	2004 AFC Asian Cup
6	26 July 2004	Chongqing, China (PRC)	Turkmenistan	1–0	0	2004 AFC Asian Cup
7	11 October 2006	Dhaka, Bangladesh	Bangladesh	4-0	1	2007 AFC Asian Cup qualification
8	15 November 2006	Tashkent, Uzbekistan	Qatar	2-0	1	2007 AFC Asian Cup qualification
9	27 March 2007	Macau SAR, China (PRC)	China	1–3	0	Friendly
10	2007	?				
