= Sacilotto =

Sacilotto is an Italian surname. Notable people with the surname include:

- Kerry Sacilotto (born 1972), Australian politician
- Luíz Sacilotto (born 1983), Brazilian footballer
