= Matteo Momentè =

Italian footballer (born 1987)

Personal information
- Date of birth: 26 February 1987 (age 39)
- Place of birth: Iesolo, Italy
- Height: 1.86 m (6 ft 1 in)
- Position: Forward

Youth career
- –2002: Montebelluna
- 2002–2006: Inter Milan

Senior career*
Years	Team	Apps	(Gls)
2005–2007	Inter Milan	0	(0)
2006–2007	→ Sambenedettese (loan)	7	(0)
2007–2009	Venezia	28	(4)
2007–2008	→ Teramo (loan)	25	(4)
2009–2015	Varese	39	(8)
2010–2011	→ AlbinoLeffe (loan)	22	(6)
2013	→ Cremonese (loan)	7	(0)
2014–2015	→ AlbinoLeffe (loan)	34	(15)
2015–2016	Mantova	13	(2)
2016	→ Bassano (loan)	10	(2)
2016–2017	Ancona	25	(4)
2017	Modena	5	(1)
2018–2019	Virtus Verona	13	(3)
2019	Pistoiese	16	(4)
2019–2020	Pianese	17	(6)
2020	Gozzano	4	(1)
2021	Pistoiese	10	(0)
2021	Cjarlins Muzane	9	(0)
2021–2022	Olginatese	17	(6)
2022–2023	ASD Città Di Caorle-La Salute		

International career
2003	Italy U16	4	(0)
2004	Italy U18	3	(0)
2005–2006	Italy U19	9	(5)
- * Club domestic league appearances and goals as of 8 October 2026

Matteo Momentè (born 26 February 1987) is an Italian footballer who plays as a forward.

== Biography ==
=== Youth career & Inter ===
Born in Jesolo, the Province of Venice, Momentè started his career at Montebelluna. In 2002, he was signed by Inter and spent 4 seasons at their youth teams.

2004–05

After Riccardo Meggiorini was promoted to first team, the loan of Isah Eliakwu, non-signing of Eros Bagnara and Federico Piovaccari was not eligible anymore at the start of 2004–05 season, the Inter 2003–04 Allievi Nazionali under-17 team league top-scorer (15 goals in regular season + 3 in playoffs) was promoted to Primavera under-20 team along with Domenico Germinale. He repeated his success in youth team, scored 4 goals in regular season of Primavera League, one goal behind the team top-scorer Matteo Lombardo, and scored the equal number of goal with Germinale, Abdoulaye Diarra and Dino Marino. Primavera team finished as the losing quarter-finalists of the playoffs round. The team failed to repeat the success of last season (runner-up) in its rebuild season. Momentè was the starting forward in that match, partnering Antonio Croce.

Also, Momentè was the team top-scorer of Berretti under-20 team, (which usually the B team of that age group, or a U-18 team) with 12 goals in regular season and entered the playoffs final, just beaten by Juventus in 3–4 aggregate. Momentè scored 2 goals in the playoffs, shared the playoffs round team top-scorer with Diarra, Simone Fautario, Omar Laribi and Roberto Floriano.

Momentè also played 4 friendlies for Inter first team in 2004–05 season, one at TIM Trophy, twice in mid-season. and received call-ups for official matches 3 times.

2005–06

In 2005–06 season, Momentè scored 10 goals for Primavera in regular season as team top-scorer, while the team exited in the first round (round of 16) of the playoffs season, eliminated by Palermo on penalties. He also won the Coppa Italia Primavera with club.

For the first team, he occasionally picked by Roberto Mancini, played numbers of friendlies in pre-season and during mid-season. Momentè made his official debut on 30 November 2005 against Parma, a Coppa Italia match. He started that match as winger and substituted by Marco Materazzi in 71st minute, which few minutes later Obafemi Martins scored the winning goal. Not call-up in the next match on 3 December against Ascoli in Serie A, he played for the first team in the second next match on 6 December, made his European debut against Rangers F.C. in UEFA Champions League, which also the last group stage match and Inter already qualified as the first regardless the result. Momentè replaced Materazzi in the 41st minute, at that time Inter 1–1 draw with Rangers but eventually both team failed to score again. Momentè played once more for Inter on 2 February 2006, a Cup match against Lazio, which he started the match and partnered with Adriano.

=== Sambenedettese & Venezia ===
Momentè graduated from youth team in June 2006. In August 2006, he was loaned to Serie C1 side Sambenedettese. Unlike in youth team, Momentè just made 7 goalless appearances as subs, he was sold to Serie C1 side Venezia in co-ownership deal in January 2007, for a peppercorn fee of €500. After a handful appearances, Inter sold the remained 50% registration rights to Venezia in June 2007 for free. He was loaned to Serie C2 side Teramo days before the opening match. Momentè returned to Venice in 2008–09 season, scored 4 league goals. But Venezia went bankrupt in 2009.

=== Varese & AlbinoLeffe ===
Momentè was signed by Serie B side AlbinoLeffe on free transfer after the bankruptcy of Venice. However Momentè spent most of his contract with Varese, which AlbinoLeffe farmed him to.

2009–10

In the first season the Prima Divisione (ex-Serie C1) side signed him in a co-ownership deal.; He scored 2 goals in his debut match against Cavese in Coppa Italia, bring the club from losing 2 goals to 2–2 draw. The game ended at 7–5 penalty shootout. Momentè failed to secure a solid place in starting XI, competed the forward role with Stefano Del Sante and Pietro Tripoli to partner with Osarimen Ebagua (in although head coach Giuseppe Sannino also used 3 strikers). Varese signed Neto in January, made the role highly competitive. Momentè won promotion to Serie B with team and Varese bought him outright in June 2010.

2010–11

However, on 14 July 2010, he was loaned to AlbinoLeffe which the team had lost both Francesco Ruopolo and Marco Cellini on a reported free transfer. He made 11 starts and 12 substitute appearances for the team, scored 6 Serie B goals (as the third team-scorer, behind Omar Torri (11 goals) and Paolo Grossi, midfielder, 8 goals). He was injured on 29 January 2011 and missed rest of the season. In the first half of the season he had to compete with other strikers, which he partnered with Torri (3 times), then Karamoko Cissé (3 times) and Andrea Cocco (4 times) in the starting line-up. He also played once as sole striker in 4–5–1 formation against Lazio in 2010–11 Coppa Italia.

2011–12

In July 2011 he was sold outright to AlbinoLeffe for free but sold back to Varese in co-ownership deal for €250, effectively reversed to 2009 deal.

In June 2012 Varese acquired Momentè outright for free. Momentè only played once for Varese in 2011–12 Serie B.

2012–13

Momentè played 11 times in the first half of 2012–13 Serie B. On 31 January 2013 he was signed by the third division club Cremonese in temporary deal. The club also released former AlbinoLeffe teammate Leandro Martínez and Roberto Previtali on the same day.

2014–15

Momentè returned to AlbinoLeffe, now at the third division, on 1 September 2014, he played one game in 2013–14 Serie B, with substitute appearance.

=== Serie C clubs ===
In summer 2015 he was signed by Mantova. On 28 January 2016 Momentè left for Bassano Virtus in a temporary deal.

On 31 August 2016 Momentè was signed by Ancona. On 26 July 2017 Momentè was signed by Modena. On 8 February 2019, he signed with Pistoiese. On 14 July 2019, he joined Pianese. On 31 January 2020, he moved to Gozzano. On 11 February 2021, he returned to Pistoiese.

=== Serie D ===
On 24 August 2021, he signed with Serie D club Cjarlins Muzane.

=== International career ===
Momentè capped for Italy youth teams from 2003 to 2006. He played for Italy in 2006 UEFA European Under-19 Football Championship qualification, which he scored 1 of the 3 Italian goals. Italy finished as the 3rd and failed to qualify for the elite qualification.

He also scored a goal in an unofficial friendly against Italy senior team in October 2004. Momentè received his last call-up in May 2006 from Italy U18 (de facto U20 B team) along with Giacomo Bindi and Domenico Germinale, for the match on 31 May, all as overage player. The unofficial match Azzurrini won Juniores Best XI 3–1, the two Inter strikers scored 1 goal each. (The U19 team [de facto U20] was against Serie D Best XI on the next day and both teams (U18/19) filled with players that no longer eligible to 2007 U19 Euro and the team eliminated from 2006 edition. Both team also coached by Paolo Berrettini.)

== Honors ==
Inter youth teams

- Coppa Italia Primavera: 2006
