= Simone Santarelli =

Italian footballer

Personal information
- Date of birth: 7 September 1988 (age 38)
- Place of birth: Rome, Italy
- Height: 1.84 m (6 ft 1/2 in)
- Position: Goalkeeper

Youth career
- Lazio

Senior career*
| Years | Team | Apps | (Gls) |
| 2007–2010 | Lazio | 0 | (0) |
| 2007–2008 | → Gallipoli (loan) | 2 | (0) |
| 2010–2011 | Foggia | 20 | (0) |

International career
| 2004–2005 | Italy U-17 | 2 | (0) |
- * Club domestic league appearances and goals

Simone Santarelli (born 7 September 1988) is an Italian footballer who plays as a goalkeeper.

== Club career ==
Born in Rome, Lazio, Santarelli is a supporter of S.S. Lazio and started his career in its youth teams. In 2007–08 season he moved to Gallipoli along with Lucas Correa, Daniele Greco and Matteo Merini. He was the understudy of Generoso Rossi along with Joachim Spina. He played twice in Serie C1 and played a few matches in Coppa Italia Serie C. He returned to Lazio on 1 July 2008 and later frozen by the club. He unable to train along with the first team and the club demanded a high transfer fee. On 5 August 2010 he signed a 1+1 contract with Prima Divisione team Foggia. Half of the matches was played by Santarelli, shared with Mihail Ivanov.

== International career ==
Santarelli became an emergency third keeper for the Italy Under-17 side at 2005 UEFA European Under-17 Football Championship. He replaced injured Paolo Tornaghi (himself replaced suspended Enrico Alfonso) to play for Bronze match, beaten the original third keeper Alberto Frison who also injured. He also selected to 2005 FIFA U-17 World Championship.
