= Ghisberto =

Italian political cartoonist

Ghisberto is an Italian political cartoonist. He has been described as a right-wing populist for his cartoons, which attack left-wing politicians and immigrants.

== Biography ==
Ghisberto worked briefly as a cartoonist in 1993. Having moved to Cuba, he began uploading political cartoons to his website and social media in 2016. Unlike Alfio Krancic of the right-wing newspaper Il Giornale and Mario Improta (nicknamed Marione) of the Five Star Movement party, Ghisberto's cartoons are produced independently and the only oversight is his frequent blocking and banning from social media.

== Analysis ==
Post-partigiani del web ("Online Post-Partisans"), a Ghisberto cartoon mocking the left wing. From left to right: an obese, unhygienic man calls his opponents racists and sexists; a drug addict curses the names of God and Mary; a feminist with sagging breasts calls for gender-inclusive language. On the right, an infuriated Italian partisan from World War II says "there are people worth shooting here!" Also note a Zecca Rossa ("Red Tick"), a common slur for leftists, saying "Africans First!"

Ghisberto's cartoons often show sharp divides between a perceived left-wing elite and the common people: the former are portrayed as living in wealthy, gated communities and using migrants as servants, while the latter are deemed racists by the elite and portrayed as living in poverty with dangerous migrants. Migrant men are depicted in a sexualised manner, while left-wing women are shown to support migration in order to have sex with them; the migrants are also shown as wealthy, and Muslims as a fifth column. Left-wing women are drawn to be ugly with sagging breasts, while the men wear ragged clothes and stink. Pro-migrant NGOs, such as Sea-Watch, and the European Union are caricaturised as military enemies that Italy must defend itself from. While right-wing leaders, such as Giorgia Meloni and Matteo Salvini, occasionally feature in a positive light, Ghisberto's cartoons vary from many of his fellow right-wing artists in that they do not endorse a leader to fight against the perceived elite. He has also made Vignette Buoniste ("Do-Gooder Cartoons") that are sympathetic to migrants and people from third-world countries.

In July 2017, Ghisberto made a cartoon showing a wall between a "Communist beach" and a "Fascist beach". The former is full of litter, drugs, miscegenation, migrant boats, and public urination and defecation. The latter – guarded by Benito Mussolini – has traditional families and gas chambers for opponents. Mattia Salvia of Vice News considered that it showed a false dichotomy between fascism and communism. According to Corrado Mordasini of the Swiss-Italian website GAS, the works of Ghisberto and Marione seek to anger more than to entertain.

== Notable cartoons ==
In January 2017, Ghisberto received wider attention for his response to a Charlie Hebdo cartoon mocking earthquakes and avalanches in central Italy. While the French publication showed Death skiing downhill, Ghisberto showed rescue workers skiing faster and giving Death the middle finger. The image was shared by Sergio Pirozzi, mayor of the affected town of Amatrice.

In August 2020, Ghisberto made a cartoon comparing perceived scaremongering over four COVID-19 deaths in one day to 1,121 deaths from heart disease and cancer. The image was shared by Alberto Zangrillo, head of anaesthesia and resucitation at San Raffaele Hospital in Milan, to some controversy.
