= TIM Trophy =

Italian association football pre-season tournament

- Founded: 2001; 25 years ago
- Region: Italy
- Teams: 3
- Current champions: (Spain) Celta Vigo (1st title)
- Most championships: (Italy) Internazionale (8 titles)

The TIM Trophy is a football pre-season tournament that was firstly contested in August 2001. It is not sanctioned or recognized by official football bodies since the gameplay rules do not correspond to IFAB/FIFA laws of football. For the first twelve editions, the competing teams were Juventus, Internazionale and Milan. For both the 2013 and 2014 editions, Internazionale opted not to participate and was replaced by Sassuolo. For 2015, Juventus declined to participate while Internazionale returned. In the 2016 edition, Internazionale opted out again, and was replaced by Celta Vigo, becoming the first non-Italian team to compete in the tournament, and leaving Milan as the only original team participating. To date, no tournament has been held since 2016. Overall, Internazionale has eight titles, Milan five, and Juventus, Sassuolo and Celta Vigo one each.

The teams play three round-robin 45-minute matches. If any match ends in a draw, it is decided by a penalty shoot-out. Three points are awarded for a victory during regular play, with zero points awarded to the loser. If the match is decided by penalties, the winner is awarded two points and the loser one point. The organizers decide which two teams would play in the first match of the evening. The third team then play against the losing team from the first match, and end the tournament by playing against the first-match winner.

== Winners ==
Team	Times played	Titles won	Years
(Italy) Internazionale	13	8	2002, 2003, 2004, 2005, 2007, 2010, 2011, 2012
(Italy) Milan	16	5	2001, 2006, 2008, 2014, 2015
(Italy) Juventus	14	1	2009
(Italy) Sassuolo	4	1	2013
(Spain) Celta Vigo	1	1	2016

=== Winners by year ===
- 2001: (Italy) Milan
- 2002: (Italy) Internazionale
- 2003: (Italy) Internazionale
- 2004: (Italy) Internazionale
- 2005: (Italy) Internazionale
- 2006: (Italy) Milan
- 2007: (Italy) Internazionale
- 2008: (Italy) Milan
- 2009: (Italy) Juventus
- 2010: (Italy) Internazionale
- 2011: (Italy) Internazionale
- 2012: (Italy) Internazionale
- 2013: (Italy) Sassuolo
- 2014: (Italy) Milan
- 2015: (Italy) Milan
- 2016: (Spain) Celta Vigo

== Editions ==
=== 2001 TIM Trophy ===
==== Standings ====
- 3 points for a win, 0 points for a defeat
- 2 points for a penalty shoot-out win, 1 point for a penalty shoot-out defeat
- Milan won the tournament

Pos	Team	Pld	W	PKW	PKL	L	GF	GA	GD	Pts
1	(Italy) Milan	2	1	1	0	0	1	0	+1	5
2	(Italy) Juventus	2	0	1	0	1	0	1	−1	2
3	(Italy) Internazionale	2	0	0	2	0	0	0	0	2

==== Scorers ====
Rank	Name	Team	Goals
1	(Georgia (country)) Kakha Kaladze	(Italy) Milan	1

==== Matches ====
9 August 2001
21:00 CEST

Internazionale (Italy)	0–0	(Italy) Milan
Penalties
Vieri (penalty scored); Seedorf (penalty scored); Kallon (penalty scored); Materazzi (penalty missed)	3–5	(penalty scored) Shevchenko; (penalty scored) Rui Costa; (penalty scored) Serginho; (penalty scored) Contra; (penalty scored) F. Inzaghi

Stadio Nereo Rocco, Trieste
Referee: Massimiliano Saccani (Italy)

9 August 2001
22:15 CEST

Internazionale (Italy)	0–0	(Italy) Juventus
Penalties
Vieri (penalty scored); Belözoğlu (penalty missed); Cauet (penalty scored); Greško (penalty missed); Dalmat (penalty missed)	2–3	(penalty scored) Del Piero; (penalty missed) Pessotto; (penalty scored) Maresca; (penalty missed) Trezeguet; (penalty scored) Tacchinardi

Stadio Nereo Rocco, Trieste
Referee: Stefano Cassarà (Italy)

9 August 2001
23:15 CEST

Milan (Italy)	1–0	(Italy) Juventus
Kaladze 31'

Stadio Nereo Rocco, Trieste
Referee: Paolo Bertini (Italy)

=== 2002 TIM Trophy ===
==== Standings ====
- 3 points for a win, 0 points for a defeat
- 2 points for a penalty shoot-out win, 1 point for a penalty shoot-out defeat
- Internazionale won the tournament

Pos	Team	Pld	W	PKW	PKL	L	GF	GA	GD	Pts
1	(Italy) Internazionale	2	1	0	1	0	2	0	+2	4
2	(Italy) Milan	2	1	0	0	1	1	2	−1	3
3	(Italy) Juventus	2	0	1	0	1	0	1	−1	2

==== Scorers ====
Rank	Name	Team	Goals
1	(Italy) Christian Vieri	(Italy) Internazionale	2
2	(Ukraine) Andriy Shevchenko	(Italy) Milan	1

==== Matches ====
31 July 2002
21:00 CEST

Juventus (Italy)	0–0	(Italy) Internazionale
	Report
Penalties
Del Piero (penalty scored); Camoranesi (penalty scored); Fresi (penalty scored); Birindelli (penalty scored)	4–2	(penalty scored) Kallon; (penalty missed) Córdoba; (penalty scored) Dalmat; (penalty missed) Conceição

Stadio Nereo Rocco, Trieste
Referee: Matteo Trefoloni (Italy)

31 July 2002
22:00 CEST

Internazionale (Italy)	2–0	(Italy) Milan
Vieri 18' (pen.), 32'	Report

Stadio Nereo Rocco, Trieste
Referee: Paolo Bertini (Italy)

31 July 2002
23:00 CEST

Milan (Italy)	1–0	(Italy) Juventus
Shevchenko 17'	Report

Stadio Nereo Rocco, Trieste
Referee: Massimiliano Saccani (Italy)

=== 2003 TIM Trophy ===
==== Standings ====
- 3 points for a win, 0 points for a defeat
- 2 points for a penalty shoot-out win, 1 point for a penalty shoot-out defeat
- Internazionale won the tournament

Pos	Team	Pld	W	PKW	PKL	L	GF	GA	GD	Pts
1	(Italy) Internazionale	2	2	0	0	0	2	0	+2	6
2	(Italy) Juventus	2	1	0	0	1	1	1	0	3
3	(Italy) Milan	2	0	0	0	2	0	2	−2	0

==== Scorers ====
Rank	Name	Team	Goals
1	(Argentina) Hernán Crespo	(Italy) Internazionale	1
1	(Sierra Leone) Mohamed Kallon	(Italy) Internazionale	1
1	(Ghana) Stephen Appiah	(Italy) Juventus	1

==== Matches ====
12 August 2003
21:00 CEST

Juventus (Italy)	1–0	(Italy) Milan
Appiah 30'

Stadio del Conero, Ancona
Referee: Danilo Nucini (Italy)

12 August 2003
22:00 CEST

Internazionale (Italy)	1–0	(Italy) Milan
Kallon 5'

Stadio del Conero, Ancona
Referee: Paolo Dondarini (Italy)

12 August 2003
23:00 CEST

Internazionale (Italy)	1–0	(Italy) Juventus
Crespo 3'

Stadio del Conero, Ancona
Referee: Emidio Morganti (Italy)

=== 2004 TIM Trophy ===
==== Standings ====
- 3 points for a win, 0 points for a defeat
- 2 points for a penalty shoot-out win, 1 point for a penalty shoot-out defeat
- Internazionale won the tournament

Pos	Team	Pld	W	PKW	PKL	L	GF	GA	GD	Pts
1	(Italy) Internazionale	2	1	1	0	0	1	0	+1	5
2	(Italy) Milan	2	1	0	1	0	2	0	+2	4
3	(Italy) Juventus	2	0	0	0	2	0	3	−3	0

==== Scorers ====
Rank	Name	Team	Goals
1	(Nigeria) Obafemi Martins	(Italy) Internazionale	1
1	(Italy) Massimo Ambrosini	(Italy) Milan	1
1	(Italy) Nicola Pozzi	(Italy) Milan	1

==== Matches ====
27 July 2004
21:00 CEST

Internazionale (Italy)	1–0	(Italy) Juventus
Martins 36'	Report

San Siro, Milan
Attendance: 52,475
Referee: Paolo Bertini (Italy)

27 July 2004
22:00 CEST

Milan (Italy)	2–0	(Italy) Juventus
Pozzi 5'; Ambrosini 9'	Report

San Siro, Milan
Attendance: 52,475
Referee: Paolo Dondarini (Italy)

27 July 2004
23:00 CEST

Internazionale (Italy)	0–0	(Italy) Milan
	Report
Penalties
Germinale (penalty scored); Semenzato (penalty scored); Fautario (penalty scored); Momentè (penalty scored); Laribi (penalty scored)	5–4	(penalty scored) Crespo; (penalty scored) Pirlo; (penalty missed) Dhorasoo; (penalty scored) Brocchi; (penalty scored) Costacurta

San Siro, Milan
Attendance: 52,475
Referee: Nicola Rizzoli (Italy)

=== 2005 TIM Trophy ===
==== Standings ====
- 3 points for a win, 0 points for a defeat
- 2 points for a penalty shoot-out win, 1 point for a penalty shoot-out defeat
- Internazionale won the tournament

Pos	Team	Pld	W	PKW	PKL	L	GF	GA	GD	Pts
1	(Italy) Internazionale	2	1	1	0	0	1	0	+1	5
2	(Italy) Milan	2	1	0	1	0	2	1	+1	4
3	(Italy) Juventus	2	0	0	0	2	1	3	−2	0

==== Scorers ====
Rank	Name	Team	Goals
1	(Nigeria) Obafemi Martins	(Italy) Internazionale	1
1	(France) David Trezeguet	(Italy) Juventus	1
1	(Portugal) Rui Costa	(Italy) Milan	1
1	(Italy) Christian Vieri	(Italy) Milan	1

==== Matches ====
20 July 2005
21:00 CEST

Internazionale (Italy)	0–0	(Italy) Milan
Penalties
Arrieta (penalty missed); Júlio César (penalty scored); Materazzi (penalty scored); Martins (penalty scored); Solari (penalty scored); Womé (penalty scored)	5–4	(penalty scored) Seedorf; (penalty scored) Rui Costa; (penalty missed) Serginho; (penalty scored) Costacurta; (penalty scored) Ardemagni; (penalty missed) Ambrosini

Stadio Nereo Rocco, Trieste
Referee: Nicola Rizzoli (Italy)

20 July 2005
22:00 CEST

Juventus (Italy)	1–2	(Italy) Milan
Trezeguet 36'		Vieri 8' (pen.); Rui Costa 24'

Stadio Nereo Rocco, Trieste
Referee: Emidio Morganti (Italy)

20 July 2005
23:00 CEST

Juventus (Italy)	0–1	(Italy) Internazionale
		Martins 43'

Stadio Nereo Rocco, Trieste
Referee: Tiziano Pieri (Italy)

=== 2006 TIM Trophy ===
==== Standings ====
- 3 points for a win, 0 points for a defeat
- 2 points for a penalty shoot-out win, 1 point for a penalty shoot-out defeat
- Milan won the tournament

Pos	Team	Pld	W	PKW	PKL	L	GF	GA	GD	Pts
1	(Italy) Milan	2	2	0	0	0	5	2	+3	6
2	(Italy) Juventus	2	0	1	0	1	2	4	−2	2
3	(Italy) Internazionale	2	0	0	1	1	2	3	−1	1

==== Scorers ====
Rank	Name	Team	Goals
1	(Netherlands) Clarence Seedorf	(Italy) Milan	2
2	(Argentina) Julio Cruz	(Italy) Internazionale	1
2	(Portugal) Luís Figo	(Italy) Internazionale	1
2	(Italy) Alessandro Del Piero	(Italy) Juventus	1
2	(Uruguay) Marcelo Zalayeta	(Italy) Juventus	1
2	(Italy) Marco Borriello	(Italy) Milan	1
2	(Italy) Giuseppe Favalli	(Italy) Milan	1
2	(Brazil) Kaká	(Italy) Milan	1

==== Matches ====
31 August 2006
21:00 CEST

Internazionale (Italy)	1–2	(Italy) Milan
Cruz 19'	Report	Favalli 31'; Borriello 35'

San Siro, Milan
Attendance: 18,110
Referee: Gianluca Rocchi (Italy)

31 August 2006
22:00 CEST

Internazionale (Italy)	1–1	(Italy) Juventus
Figo 27'	Report	Del Piero 5'
Penalties
Cruz (penalty scored); Adriano (penalty missed); Figo (penalty scored); Maaroufi (penalty scored); Marino (penalty missed)	3–4	(penalty scored) Nedvěd; (penalty scored) Guzmán; (penalty missed) Birindelli; (penalty scored) Zalayeta; (penalty scored) Del Piero

San Siro, Milan
Attendance: 18,110
Referee: Mauro Bergonzi (Italy)

31 August 2006
23:00 CEST

Milan (Italy)	3–1	(Italy) Juventus
Seedorf 26', 45+2'; Kaká 38' (pen.)	Report	Zalayeta 5'

San Siro, Milan
Attendance: 18,110
Referee: Andrea De Marco (Italy)

=== 2007 TIM Trophy ===
==== Standings ====
- 3 points for a win, 0 points for a defeat
- 2 points for a penalty shoot-out win, 1 point for a penalty shoot-out defeat
- Internazionale won the tournament

Pos	Team	Pld	W	PKW	PKL	L	GF	GA	GD	Pts
1	(Italy) Internazionale	2	1	1	0	0	1	0	+1	5
2	(Italy) Milan	2	1	0	0	1	1	1	0	3
3	(Italy) Juventus	2	0	0	1	1	0	1	−1	1

==== Scorers ====
Rank	Name	Team	Goals
1	(Italy) Alberto Gilardino	(Italy) Milan	1
1	(Uruguay) Álvaro Recoba	(Italy) Internazionale	1

==== Matches ====
14 August 2007
21:00 CEST

Internazionale (Italy)	0–0	(Italy) Juventus
	Report
Penalties
Jiménez (penalty scored); Cruz (penalty scored); Samuel (penalty scored); César (penalty scored); Burdisso (penalty scored)	5–4	(penalty missed) Criscito; (penalty scored) Iaquinta; (penalty scored) Andrade; (penalty scored) Salihamidžić; (penalty scored) Del Piero

San Siro, Milan
Attendance: 25,280
Referee: Domenico Celi (Italy)

14 August 2007
22:00 CEST

Milan (Italy)	1–0	(Italy) Juventus
Gilardino 26'	Report

San Siro, Milan
Attendance: 25,280
Referee: Andrea Gervasoni (Italy)

14 August 2007
23:00 CEST

Internazionale (Italy)	1–0	(Italy) Milan
Recoba 28'	Report

San Siro, Milan
Attendance: 25,280
Referee: Antonio Damato (Italy)

=== 2008 TIM Trophy ===
==== Standings ====
- 3 points for a win, 0 points for a defeat
- 2 points for a penalty shoot-out win, 1 point for a penalty shoot-out defeat
- Milan won the tournament based on head-to-head result

Pos	Team	Pld	W	PKW	PKL	L	GF	GA	GD	Pts
1	(Italy) Milan	2	0	2	0	0	2	2	0	4
2	(Italy) Juventus	2	1	0	1	0	3	2	+1	4
3	(Italy) Internazionale	2	0	0	1	1	0	1	−1	1

==== Scorers ====
Rank	Name	Team	Goals
1	(Netherlands) Clarence Seedorf	(Italy) Milan	2
2	(Italy) Vincenzo Iaquinta	(Italy) Juventus	1
2	(France) David Trezeguet	(Italy) Juventus	1
2	(Italy) Marco Marchionni	(Italy) Juventus	1

==== Matches ====
29 July 2008
20:30 CEST

Juventus (Italy)	2–2	(Italy) Milan
Trezeguet 9'; Marchionni 12'	Report	Seedorf 8', 43'
Penalties
Trezeguet (penalty missed); Iaquinta (penalty scored); Chiellini (penalty scored); Tiago (penalty missed)	2–4	(penalty scored) Kaká; (penalty scored) Pirlo; (penalty scored) Jankulovski; (penalty scored) Paloschi

Stadio Olimpico, Turin
Attendance: 20,000
Referee: Christian Brighi (Italy)

29 July 2008
21:30 CEST

Juventus (Italy)	1–0	(Italy) Internazionale
Iaquinta 27'	Report

Stadio Olimpico, Turin
Attendance: 20,000
Referee: Gabriele Gava (Italy)

29 July 2008
22:30 CEST

Milan (Italy)	0–0	(Italy) Internazionale
	Report
Penalties
Kaká (penalty scored); Oddo (penalty missed); Jankulovski (penalty scored); Favalli (penalty missed); Brocchi (penalty scored); Digão (penalty scored)	4–3	(penalty scored) Adriano; (penalty missed) Figo; (penalty scored) Suazo; (penalty missed) Jiménez; (penalty scored) Santon; (penalty missed) Muntari

Stadio Olimpico, Turin
Attendance: 20,000
Referee: Christian Brighi (Italy)

=== 2009 TIM Trophy ===
==== Standings ====
- 3 points for a win, 0 points for a defeat
- 2 points for a penalty shoot-out win, 1 point for a penalty shoot-out defeat
- Juventus won the tournament for the first time

Pos	Team	Pld	W	PKW	PKL	L	GF	GA	GD	Pts
1	(Italy) Juventus	2	1	1	0	0	3	1	+2	5
2	(Italy) Internazionale	2	1	0	1	0	2	1	+1	4
3	(Italy) Milan	2	0	0	0	2	0	3	−3	0

==== Scorers ====
Rank	Name	Team	Goals
1	(Brazil) Amauri	(Italy) Juventus	2
2	(Brazil) Thiago Motta	(Italy) Internazionale	1
2	(Italy) Mario Balotelli	(Italy) Internazionale	1
2	(Italy) Vincenzo Iaquinta	(Italy) Juventus	1

==== Matches ====
14 August 2009
20:30 CEST

Internazionale (Italy)	1–1	(Italy) Juventus
Motta 25'	Report	Amauri 43'
Penalties
Milito (penalty scored); Balotelli (penalty scored); Chivu (penalty scored); Motta (penalty scored); Samuel (penalty missed); Vieira (penalty scored); Santon (penalty missed)	5–6	(penalty scored) Salihamidžić; (penalty scored) Grygera; (penalty scored) Felipe Melo; (penalty missed) Poulsen; (penalty scored) Amauri; (penalty scored) Iaquinta; (penalty scored) Legrottaglie

Stadio Adriatico, Pescara
Referee: Antonio Damato (Italy)

14 August 2009
21:30 CEST

Milan (Italy)	0–1	(Italy) Internazionale
	Report	Balotelli 23'

Stadio Adriatico, Pescara
Referee: Paolo Valeri (Italy)

14 August 2009
22:30 CEST

Milan (Italy)	0–2	(Italy) Juventus
	Report	Amauri 13'; Iaquinta 31'

Stadio Adriatico, Pescara
Referee: Carmine Russo (Italy)

=== 2010 TIM Trophy ===
==== Standings ====
- 3 points for a win, 0 points for a defeat
- 2 points for a penalty shoot-out win, 1 point for a penalty shoot-out defeat
- Internazionale won the tournament

Pos	Team	Pld	W	PKW	PKL	L	GF	GA	GD	Pts
1	(Italy) Internazionale	2	1	1	0	0	1	0	+1	5
2	(Italy) Milan	2	0	1	1	0	1	1	0	3
3	(Italy) Juventus	2	0	0	1	1	1	2	−1	1

==== Scorers ====
Rank	Name	Team	Goals
1	(Netherlands) Wesley Sneijder	(Italy) Internazionale	1
1	(Brazil) Diego	(Italy) Juventus	1
1	(Brazil) Ronaldinho	(Italy) Milan	1

==== Matches ====
13 August 2010
20:45 CEST

Internazionale (Italy)	1–0	(Italy) Juventus
Sneijder 25'	Report

Stadio San Nicola, Bari
Referee: Domenico Celi (Italy)

13 August 2010
21:45 CEST

Milan (Italy)	1–1	(Italy) Juventus
Ronaldinho 21'	Report	Diego 33'
Penalties
Ronaldinho (penalty scored); Borriello (penalty scored); Pirlo (penalty scored); Nesta (penalty scored)	4–2	(penalty scored) Trezeguet; (penalty scored) Diego; (penalty missed) Pepe; (penalty missed) Amauri

Stadio San Nicola, Bari
Referee: Antonio Giannoccaro (Italy)

13 August 2010
22:45 CEST

Milan (Italy)	0–0	(Italy) Internazionale
	Report
Penalties
Flamini (penalty missed); Inzaghi (penalty missed); Oddo (penalty scored); Huntelaar (penalty scored); Ronaldinho (penalty missed)	2–3	(penalty scored) Milito; (penalty missed) Mancini; (penalty scored) Coutinho; (penalty scored) Obi; (penalty missed) Stanković

Stadio San Nicola, Bari
Referee: Domenico Celi (Italy)

=== 2011 TIM Trophy ===
==== Standings ====
- 3 points for a win, 0 points for a defeat
- 2 points for a penalty shoot-out win, 1 point for a penalty shoot-out defeat
- Internazionale won the tournament

Pos	Team	Pld	W	PKW	PKL	L	GF	GA	GD	Pts
1	(Italy) Internazionale	2	1	1	0	0	2	1	+1	5
2	(Italy) Juventus	2	1	0	1	0	3	2	+1	4
3	(Italy) Milan	2	0	0	0	2	1	3	−2	0

==== Scorers ====
Rank	Name	Team	Goals
1	(Argentina) Diego Milito	(Italy) Internazionale	1
1	(Italy) Andrea Ranocchia	(Italy) Internazionale	1
1	(Montenegro) Mirko Vucinic	(Italy) Juventus	1
1	(Chile) Arturo Vidal	(Italy) Juventus	1
1	(Italy) Alessandro Matri	(Italy) Juventus	1
1	(Italy) Antonio Cassano	(Italy) Milan	1

==== Matches ====
18 August 2011
20:45 CEST

Juventus (Italy)	1–1	(Italy) Internazionale
Vučinić 9'	Report	Ranocchia 16'
Penalties
Del Piero (penalty scored); Pasquato (penalty missed); Bonucci (penalty scored); Vučinić (penalty scored); Pirlo (penalty scored); Lichtsteiner (penalty scored); Barzagli (penalty missed)	5–6	(penalty scored) Pazzini; (penalty scored) Motta; (penalty missed) Pandev; (penalty scored) Sneijder; (penalty scored) Stanković; (penalty scored) Ranocchia; (penalty scored) Samuel

Stadio San Nicola, Bari
Referee: Antonio Damato (Italy)

18 August 2011
21:45 CEST

Juventus (Italy)	2–1	(Italy) Milan
Vidal 21'; Matri 45+2'	Report	Cassano 13'

Stadio San Nicola, Bari
Referee: Antonio Giannoccaro (Italy)

18 August 2011
22:45 CEST

Internazionale (Italy)	1–0	(Italy) Milan
Milito 28'	Report

Stadio San Nicola, Bari
Referee: Antonio Damato (Italy)

=== 2012 TIM Trophy ===
==== Standings ====
- 3 points for a win, 0 points for a defeat
- 2 points for a penalty shoot-out win, 1 point for a penalty shoot-out defeat
- Internazionale won the tournament

Pos	Team	Pld	W	PKW	PKL	L	GF	GA	GD	Pts
1	(Italy) Internazionale	2	2	0	0	0	3	1	+2	6
2	(Italy) Juventus	2	1	0	0	1	1	1	0	3
3	(Italy) Milan	2	0	0	0	2	1	3	−2	0

==== Scorers ====
Rank	Name	Team	Goals
1	(Brazil) Philippe Coutinho	(Italy) Internazionale	1
1	(Colombia) Fredy Guarín	(Italy) Internazionale	1
1	(Argentina) Rodrigo Palacio	(Italy) Internazionale	1
1	(Montenegro) Mirko Vučinić	(Italy) Juventus	1
1	(Italy) Stephan El Shaarawy	(Italy) Milan	1

==== Matches ====
21 July 2012
20:45 CEST

Juventus (Italy)	0–1	(Italy) Internazionale
	Report	Coutinho 11'

Stadio San Nicola, Bari
Referee: Carmine Russo (Italy)

21 July 2012
21:45 CEST

Juventus (Italy)	1–0	(Italy) Milan
Vučinić 31' (pen.)	Report

Stadio San Nicola, Bari
Referee: Marco Guida (Italy)

21 July 2012
22:45 CEST

Internazionale (Italy)	2–1	(Italy) Milan
Guarín 25'; Palacio 34'	Report	El Shaarawy 16'

Stadio San Nicola, Bari
Referee: Carmine Russo (Italy)

=== 2013 TIM Trophy ===
==== Standings ====
- 3 points for a win, 0 points for a defeat
- 2 points for a penalty shoot-out win, 1 point for a penalty shoot-out defeat
- Internazionale decided not to participate
- Sassuolo participated in tournament for first time

Pos	Team	Pld	W	PKW	PKL	L	GF	GA	GD	Pts
1	(Italy) Sassuolo	2	1	0	1	0	2	1	+1	4
2	(Italy) Juventus	2	0	1	1	0	0	0	0	3
3	(Italy) Milan	2	0	1	0	1	1	2	−1	2

==== Scorers ====
Rank	Name	Team	Goals
1	(Italy) Gaetano Masucci	(Italy) Sassuolo	2
2	(Italy) Andrea Petagna	(Italy) Milan	1

==== Matches ====
23 July 2013
20:45 CEST

Juventus (Italy)	0–0	(Italy) Milan
	Report
Penalties
Vidal (penalty scored); Lichtsteiner (penalty missed); Tevez (penalty scored); Asamoah (penalty scored); Vučinić (penalty scored); Peluso (penalty scored); De Ceglie (penalty scored); Padoin (penalty missed)	6–7	(penalty scored) Robinho; (penalty scored) De Jong; (penalty scored) Mexès; (penalty scored) Niang; (penalty missed) Nocerino; (penalty scored) Bonera; (penalty scored) Traoré; (penalty scored) Zaccardo

Stadio Città del Tricolore, Reggio Emilia
Attendance: 20,000
Referee: Andrea Gervasoni (Italy)

23 July 2013
22:15 CEST

Juventus (Italy)	0–0	(Italy) Sassuolo
	Report
Penalties
Quagliarella (penalty missed); Büchel (penalty scored); García (penalty scored); Matri (penalty missed); Vidal (penalty scored); Motta (penalty scored)	4–3	(penalty scored) Zaza; (penalty scored) Kurtić; (penalty missed) Alexe; (penalty scored) Missiroli; (penalty missed) Terranova; (penalty missed) Berardi

Stadio Città del Tricolore, Reggio Emilia
Attendance: 20,000
Referee: Sebastiano Peruzzo (Italy)

23 July 2013
23:30 CEST

Sassuolo (Italy)	2–1	(Italy) Milan
Masucci 12', 45'	Report	Petagna 4'

Stadio Città del Tricolore, Reggio Emilia
Attendance: 20,000
Referee: Andrea Gervasoni (Italy)

=== 2014 TIM Trophy ===
==== Standings ====
- 3 points for a win, 0 points for a defeat
- 2 points for a penalty shoot-out win, 1 point for a penalty shoot-out defeat
- Internazionale decided not to participate

Pos	Team	Pld	W	PKW	PKL	L	GF	GA	GD	Pts
1	(Italy) Milan	2	2	0	0	0	3	0	+3	6
2	(Italy) Juventus	2	1	0	0	1	1	1	0	3
3	(Italy) Sassuolo	2	0	0	0	2	0	3	−3	0

==== Scorers ====
Rank	Name	Team	Goals
1	(Japan) Keisuke Honda	(Italy) Milan	1
1	(France) Jérémy Ménez	(Italy) Milan	1
1	(Italy) Stephan El Shaarawy	(Italy) Milan	1
1	(Argentina) Roberto Pereyra	(Italy) Juventus	1

==== Matches ====
23 August 2014
20:45 CEST

Juventus (Italy)	0–1	(Italy) Milan
	Report	Honda 30'

Stadio Città del Tricolore, Reggio Emilia
Referee: Pierro Giacomelli (Italy)

23 August 2014
21:45 CEST

Juventus (Italy)	1–0	(Italy) Sassuolo
Pereyra 43'	Report

Stadio Città del Tricolore, Reggio Emilia
Referee: Massimiliano Irrati (Italy)

23 August 2014
22:45 CEST

Sassuolo (Italy)	0–2	(Italy) Milan
	Report	Ménez 8' (pen.); El Shaarawy 19'

Stadio Città del Tricolore, Reggio Emilia
Referee: Pierro Giacomelli (Italy)

=== 2015 TIM Trophy ===
==== Standings ====
- 3 points for a win, 0 points for a defeat
- 2 points for a penalty shoot-out win, 1 point for a penalty shoot-out defeat
- Juventus decided not to participate

Pos	Team	Pld	W	PKW	PKL	L	GF	GA	GD	Pts
1	(Italy) Milan	2	1	1	0	0	3	2	+1	5
2	(Italy) Sassuolo	2	1	0	1	0	2	1	+1	4
3	(Italy) Internazionale	2	0	0	0	2	1	3	−2	0

==== Scorers ====
Rank	Name	Team	Goals
1	(Italy) Andrea Bertolacci	(Italy) Milan	1
1	(Colombia) Carlos Bacca	(Italy) Milan	1
1	(Italy) Antonio Nocerino	(Italy) Milan	1
1	(Croatia) Marcelo Brozović	(Italy) Internazionale	1
1	(France) Grégoire Defrel	(Italy) Sassuolo	1
1	(Ghana) Alfred Duncan	(Italy) Sassuolo	1

==== Matches ====
12 August 2015
20:45 CEST

Milan (Italy)	2–1	(Italy) Internazionale
Bertolacci 5'; Bacca 23'	Report	Brozović 31'

Stadio Città del Tricolore, Reggio Emilia
Referee: Andrea Gervasoni (Italy)

12 August 2015
21:45 CEST

Internazionale (Italy)	0–1	(Italy) Sassuolo
		Defrel 23'

Stadio Città del Tricolore, Reggio Emilia
Referee: Marco Di Bello (Italy)

12 August 2015
22:45 CEST

Sassuolo (Italy)	1–1	(Italy) Milan
Duncan 7'	Report	Nocerino 45+3'
Penalties
Falcinelli (penalty scored); Floccari (penalty scored); Berardi (penalty missed); Duncan (penalty scored); Acerbi (penalty missed)	3–4	(penalty scored) Matri; (penalty scored) Cerci; (penalty scored) Suso; (penalty missed) Montolivo; (penalty scored) Nocerino

Stadio Città del Tricolore, Reggio Emilia
Referee: Andrea Gervasoni (Italy)

=== 2016 TIM Trophy ===
==== Standings ====
- 3 points for a win, 0 points for a defeat
- 2 points for a penalty shoot-out win, 1 point for a penalty shoot-out defeat
- Celta Vigo became the first non-Italian team to compete and win the competition

Pos	Team	Pld	W	PKW	PKL	L	GF	GA	GD	Pts
1	(Spain) Celta Vigo	2	1	0	1	0	1	0	+1	4
2	(Italy) Sassuolo	2	1	0	0	1	3	3	0	3
3	(Italy) Milan	2	0	1	0	1	2	3	−1	2

==== Scorers ====
Rank	Name	Team	Goals
1	(France) M'Baye Niang	(Italy) Milan	2
2	(Serbia) Dejan Dražić	(Spain) Celta Vigo	1
2	(Italy) Diego Falcinelli	(Italy) Sassuolo	1
2	(Italy) Matteo Politano	(Italy) Sassuolo	1
2	(Italy) Marcello Trotta	(Italy) Sassuolo	1

==== Matches ====
10 August 2016
21:00 CEST

Milan (Italy)	0–0	(Spain) Celta Vigo
Penalties
Bacca (penalty scored); Niang (penalty scored); Montolivo (penalty scored); Honda (penalty missed); Bonaventura (penalty scored)	4–2	(penalty missed) Aspas; (penalty missed) Wass; (penalty scored) Díaz; (penalty scored) Sisto

Stadio Città del Tricolore, Reggio Emilia

10 August 2016
22:00 CEST

Celta Vigo (Spain)	1–0	(Italy) Sassuolo
Dražić 15'

Stadio Città del Tricolore, Reggio Emilia

10 August 2016
23:00 CEST

Milan (Italy)	2–3	(Italy) Sassuolo
Niang 2' (pen.), 10'		Falcinelli 18'; Politano 32'; Trotta 40'

Stadio Città del Tricolore, Reggio Emilia
