= Umberto Improta =

Italian footballer (born 1984)

Personal information
- Date of birth: 29 February 1984 (age 42)
- Place of birth: Naples, Italy
- Height: 1.75 m (5 ft 9 in)
- Position: Forward

Senior career*
| Years | Team | Apps | (Gls) |
| 2000–2002 | Marcianise | 21 | (3) |
| 2002–2003 | Salernitana | 3 | (0) |
| 2003 | Sangiuseppese | 11 | (4) |
| 2003–2005 | Salernitana | 5 | (1) |
| 2004–2005 | → Bellaria (loan) | 36 | (8) |
| 2005–2007 | Triestina | 0 | (0) |
| 2005–2006 | → Ravenna (loan) | 23 | (4) |
| 2006–2007 | → Salernitana (loan) | 14 | (0) |
| 2007 | → Lanciano (loan) | 11 | (1) |
| 2007–2008 | South Tyrol | 22 | (1) |
| 2008 | Lumezzane | 7 | (1) |
| 2008–2009 | Giulianova | 32 | (7) |
| 2009–2011 | Lanciano | 50 | (7) |
| 2011–2015 | L'Aquila | 73 | (23) |
| 2013–2014 | → Arzanese (loan) | 32 | (7) |
| 2014–2015 | → Lamezia (loan) | 33 | (5) |
| 2015 | Taranto | 12 | (2) |
| 2015–2016 | Cavese | 10 | (0) |
| 2016–2017 | Campobasso | 29 | (7) |
| 2017–2018 | Turris | 29 | (6) |
| 2018 | Frattese | | |
| 2018–2019 | Vis Afragolese 1944 | | |
| 2020 | SSD Portici 1906 | 4 | (0) |
| 2020–2021 | Nocerina | 11 | (0) |
- * Club domestic league appearances and goals

Umberto Improta (born 29 February 1984) is an Italian former footballer who played as a forward.

His younger brothers Giancarlo and Riccardo Improta were also professional footballers.

== Club career ==
Born in Naples, Campania, Southern Italy, Improta started his senior career at Serie D club Marcianise. In 2002 Improta left for Serie B club Salernitana. He played 8 games for the first team and also played for its reserve.

In 2004 Improta left for Romagna club Bellaria, his first club outside Campania. He scored 8 goals in 2004–05 Serie C2.

=== Triestina ===
After the bankruptcy of Salernitana, Improta was signed by Serie B club, North-eastern Italy club Triestina in August 2005. Improta spent 2 seasons on loan at Serie C1 clubs, namely Romagna club Ravenna (2005–06 Serie C1), the rebirth Salernitana and Lanciano (2006–07 Serie C1). Improta left for another northern Italy team South Tyrol in August 2007. In January 2008 Improta was signed by Lumezzane. In the whole 2007–08 Serie C2, he scored a total of 2 times.

Improta left for southern Italy club Giulianova in 2008 and spent rest of his career in southern Italy. He played alongside Giancarlo Improta. Umberto scored 7 goals in 2008–09 Lega Pro Seconda Divisione (ex- Serie C2) and also scored 2 goals in promotion playoffs.

=== Lanciano return ===
Improta was transferred to fellow Lega Pro Prima Divisione (ex- Serie C1) and Abruzzo club S.S. Virtus Lanciano 1924 in 2009 (the heir of SS Lanciano, bankrupted in 2008). Improta started two-fifths of the league matches (14 games) and scored 6 goals. In the next season, Improta was one of the striking partners of Ilyos Zeytulayev and Luís Gabriel Sacilotto in 4–3–3 formation, with 14 starts. Improta was the backup of Francesco Di Gennaro in the latter half of the season.

=== L'Aquila ===
On 24 August 2011 Improta left for his third Abruzzo club L'Aquila after the emerge of his brother Riccardo. Umberto scored 12 goals in 2011–12 Lega Pro Seconda Divisione as team top-scorer. L'Aquila promoted to the third division in 2013, however Improta was ruled out from the club plan.

==== Arzanese ====
Improta joined Italian fourth division club Arzanese on 27 August 2013, re-joining Francesco Ripa who left L'Aquila on 22 August.

==== Lamezia ====
In summer 2014 he was signed by Vigor Lamezia.

== International career ==
Improta received a call-up to the Italy U21 B team specially for the 2005 Mediterranean Games. However, he later received a call-up for the last friendly match before the tournament (against the Serie D Best XI). He was dropped from the final squad along with Adriano D'Astolfo, Alex Gibbs, Alessandro Moro and Simone Rota.
