= Serhiy Kovalenko =

Ukrainian footballer (born 1984)

Personal information
- Full name: Serhiy Viktorovych Kovalenko
- Date of birth: 10 May 1984 (age 42)
- Place of birth: Chernihiv, Soviet Union (now Ukraine)
- Height: 1.85 m (6 ft 1 in)
- Positions: Midfielder; forward

Youth career
- 1998–1999: Yunist Chernihiv
- 2000: Dynamo Moscow
- 2001: Sportakademklub Moscow
- 2001–2004: Juventus

Senior career*
Years	Team	Apps	(Gls)
2004	Juventus	0	(0)
2004	→ Lodigiani (loan)	4	(0)
2004–2007	Standard Liège	55	(8)
2007	→ Lokeren (loan)	1	(0)
2007–2008	Roeselare	8	(0)
2008	Volyn Lutsk	4	(0)
2009	Torpedo Zhodino	24	(4)
2010	Belshina Bobruisk	31	(4)
2011	Polissya Dobrianka		
2012	Naftan Novopolotsk	18	(1)
2013	Sumy	11	(1)
2013	Poltava	3	(0)

International career
- Ukraine U18
- * Club domestic league appearances and goals as of 31 December 2013

Serhiy Viktorovych Kovalenko (Ukrainian: Сергій Вікторович Коваленко; born 10 May 1984) is a Ukrainian retired footballer who played as a midfielder or forward.

== Career ==
=== Early career ===
Serhiy Kovalenko started his youth career at Yunist Chernihiv. Then he moved to Russia to play for the youth squads of Dynamo Moscow and Sportakademklub Moscow.

=== Juventus ===
Kovalenko moved to Juventus youth team in 2001. He was offered a contract after a trial along with Ilyos Zeytulayev and Viktor Budyanskiy. In February 2002, he joined Juve permanently. The Turin club paid US$400,000 (about €454,000) to buy Kovalenko and Zeytulayev's image and registration rights from Sportakademklub Moscow.

==== Loan to Lodigiani ====
In January 2004, he was loaned to Lodigiani.

=== Standard Liège ===
Kovalenko joined Standard Liège in August 2004. Juve received €5,000 for the player.

==== Loan to Lokeren ====
He then joined Lokeren in January 2007.

=== Roeselare ===
In August 2007 he signed a two-year contract with Roeselare. In March 2008 he terminated his contract with Roeselare.

=== Volyn Lutsk ===
Kovalenko returned to Ukraine to play for Volyn Lutsk on 12 August 2008.

=== Torpedo Zhodino ===
In March 2009, he was signed by Torpedo Zhodino of Belarus.

== Honours ==
Naftan Novopolotsk

- Belarusian Cup: 2012
