= Antonio Croce =

Italian footballer (born 1986)

Personal information
- Date of birth: 9 June 1986 (age 40)
- Place of birth: Foggia, Italy
- Height: 1.85 m (6 ft 1 in)
- Position: Forward

Team information
- Current team: Canosa

Youth career
- Vis Pesaro

Senior career*
Years	Team	Apps	(Gls)
2004–2005	Vis Pesaro	7	(0)
2005	→ Inter Milan (loan)	0	(0)
2005–2006	Fermana	14	(0)
2006–2007	Riccione	28	(3)
2007–2008	Cologna Paese	20	(11)
2008–2010	Padova	0	(0)
2008–2009	→ Carpenedolo (loan)	31	(7)
2009–2010	→ Cassino (loan)	14	(3)
2010	→ Pro Vasto (loan)	12	(4)
2010–2011	Villacidrese	26	(9)
2011–2012	Celano	38	(12)
2012–2013	Messina	13	(2)
2013	Melfi	14	(6)
2013–2014	Bisceglie	14	(2)
2014	Torre Neapolis	13	(9)
2014	Brindisi	9	(2)
2014–2016	Monopoli	35	(13)
2016–2017	Teramo	16	(2)
2017–2018	Andria	39	(4)
2018	Gravina	6	(3)
2018–2019	Taranto	16	(3)
2019–2021	Team Altamura	29	(17)
2021–2022	Francavilla	30	(15)
2022–2023	Team Altamura	32	(10)
2023–2025	Gelbison	54	(23)
2025	Francavilla	12	(2)
2025–	Canosa		
- * Club domestic league appearances and goals as of 23 November 2025

Antonio Croce (born 9 June 1986) is an Italian footballer who plays as a forward for Eccellenza club Canosa.

== Career ==
=== Vis Pesaro ===
Born in Foggia, Apulia, Croce started his career at Marche club Vis Pesaro and was a member of its Berretti under-20 team. In the next season Croce made his debut in the first team, in 2004–05 Serie C1. He was spotted by Inter Milan in January 2005. He was the member of Primavera under-20 team, scoring 4 goals in 2005 Torneo di Viareggio, as topscorer (Premio "Miglior Cannoniere del Torneo"). Eventually Inter was the fourth. However, he only scored once in the Primavera League. In the playoff round, Croce was the starting forward along with Matteo Momentè. He scored once in the round of 16. In that rebuild season of Inter Primavera, the regular season top-scorer was Matteo Lombardo with 5 goals. and Dino Marino was the playoffs' top scorer of the team with 2 goals only. Inter was eliminated by Empoli in the quarter-finals. Inter did not purchase Croce and promoted players from its own youth system instead.

=== Modena and fell to Serie D ===
On 31 August 2005, Croce was signed by Serie B club Modena but immediately farmed to Marche club Fermana in a co-ownership deal. In June 2006, Croce was re-signed by the Emilia club Modena, but he was released to Serie D team Riccione. The team is also located in the Emilia–Romagna region. Croce once again failed to score, with 3 goals. Croce then went to the Abruzzo region for Cologna Paese. This time Croce scored 11 goals in 2007–08 Serie D.

=== Return to Lega Pro 2nd Div. ===
Croce earned a professional contract from Padova in 2008. He played in the pre-season friendlies. In August, he left for Carpenedolo, a Lega Pro Seconda Divisione team. Finally Croce opened his account in the Italian fourth level, with 7 goals. In the next season, he was signed by another fourth-level team Cassino, and left the club 6 months before the club was expelled from the league due to financial difficulty. However, his new club Pro Vasto faced the same fate. In July 2010, his contract with Padova was terminated by mutual consent, as there was no place for Croce in its 2010–11 Serie B campaign.

In 2010–11 Lega Pro Seconda Divisione, Croce was signed by Villacidrese. However, Croce faced another relegation. In 2011–12 Lega Pro Seconda Divisione, Croce was signed by Celano. However the team again relegated.

In July 2012 Croce was signed by Serie D team Messina which the club aimed to promote back to professional league in recent seasons and recently acquired by a new owner. In January 2013, he returned to the fourth level again for Melfi. He became the eldest player of the team, suppressing Giancarlo Improta. Both Croce and Improta were the goal scorers of the team.

=== Return to Serie D ===
In the 2013–14 and 2014–15 seasons, Croce had played for four Serie D teams, which, since the 2014–15 season, Serie D became the fourth level again, due to Lega Pro merging their two divisions.

=== Monopoli ===
In December 2014 he was signed by another Serie D club Monopoli. On 15 July 2015 Croce renewed his contract with the club. The club won promotion to 2015–16 Lega Pro as a replacement of bankrupted teams on 1 September.

=== Teramo ===
In June 2016 Croce was signed by Teramo.

=== Andria ===
On 30 January 2017, Croce was transferred to fellow Serie C club Andria.

=== Later career ===
In July 2018 Croce was signed by Serie D club Gravina.
