= Julien Rantier =

French footballer (born 1983)

Personal information
- Date of birth: 11 August 1983 (age 43)
- Place of birth: Alès, France
- Height: 1.75 m (5 ft 9 in)
- Positions: Forward; winger

Team information
- Current team: Vigor Carpaneto

Youth career
- 1998–2000: Nîmes

Senior career*
Years	Team	Apps	(Gls)
2000–2001	Nîmes	1	(0)
2001–2003	Atalanta	1	(0)
2003–2005	Vicenza	36	(2)
2005	→ AlbinoLeffe (loan)	13	(4)
2005–2006	Verona	39	(4)
2006–2009	Piacenza	78	(9)
2009–2010	Verona	30	(10)
2010–2012	Taranto	62	(10)
2012–2013	Perugia	30	(5)
2013–2015	Alessandria	60	(14)
2015–2016	Pro Piacenza	35	(8)
2016–2017	Bassano	16	(0)
2017	Südtirol	1	(0)
2017–	Vigor Carpaneto		
- * Club domestic league appearances and goals as of 26 February 2017 (UTC)

Julien Rantier (born 11 August 1983) is a former French footballer who played for Vigor Carpaneto as a forward.

== Career ==
=== Youth career ===
Born in Alès, Gard, Rantier started his professional career at Gard club Nîmes. After played one Ligue 2 games for the club on 7 April 2001, he joined Atalanta reserve team in summer 2001. Rantier played his only Serie A game on 17 May 2003. That match he was one of the starting forwards along with Fausto Rossini. He was replaced by Davor Vugrinec at half time, at that time losing 0–1. The match Atalanta won Como 2–1.

=== Vicenza ===
He joined Vicenza in 2003 as Atalanta sold 50% registration rights, which he played 26 Serie B games and scored one goal, impress Vicenza to sign him permanently. But the second season with Vicenza was not successful, which Rantier joined AlbinoLeffe in January 2005.

=== Verona ===
In August 2005 he joined Verona in co-ownership deal, for €270,000 on 31 August 2005. The club relegated at the end of season but renewed the co-ownership deal with Vicenza in June but sold its portion to Piacenza Calcio in July. The forward position was replaced by free agent William.

=== Piacenza ===
In next season half of Rantier's contractual rights was bought by Piacenza for €500,000 from Verona via Vicenza, which Vicenza received €20,000 of the fee (€500,000 minus €480,000). In June 2007 Piacenza bought him outright for another €500,000. Piacenza raised the fee by selling Daniele Cacia, also a forward. Rantier played 28 Serie B games for Piacenza.

=== Second spell at Verona ===
On 2 February 2009 he returned to Verona.

Despite not a regular starter in the league, Rantier played the first two games of 2009–10 Coppa Italia Lega Pro and scored a brace. However, he was replaced by Nicola Ciotola in the third and fourth games.

=== Taranto ===
In 2010, he left Verona to join Taranto. Rantier almost played all the 68 league matches for Taranto in 2 seasons but did not play in 2010–11 Coppa Italia Lega Pro nor 2011–12 Coppa Italia Lega Pro. He was suspended twice in 2011–12 season due to his fourth caution and his second caution in 2010–11 promotion play-off.

=== Perugia ===
After the bankruptcy of Taranto, he was signed by Perugia. He made over 30 appearances that season, but half of them were substitutes, including all 4 matches in 2012–13 Coppa Italia Lega Pro .

=== Alessandria, Pro Piacenza, Bassano Virtus and Südtirol ===
On 9 July 2013 he signed a two-year contract with Alessandria; on 19 June 2015 the club announces that the expiring contract of Rantier will not be renewed, leaving him free transfer. At the beginning of July agreeing with the Pro Piacenza where he will play for one season. In the summer of 2016 he joined Bassano Virtus. But in January 2017, he left Bassano to join Südtirol.

== Career statistics ==
(Note: Julien Rantier – French league stats at LFP – also available in French (archived))

Team	Season	Division	League		Cup		League Cup		Total	
Team	Season	Division	Apps	Goals	Apps	Goals	Apps	Goals	Apps	Goals
France
Nîmes	2000–01	Ligue 2	1	0	0	0	0	0	1	0
Italy
Atalanta	2001–02	Serie A	0	0	0	0	—	—	0	0
Atalanta	2002–03	Serie A	1	0	0	0	—	—	1	0
Vicenza	2003–04	Serie B	26	1	0	0	—	—	26	1
Vicenza	2004–05	Serie B	10	1	2	0	—	—	12	1
AlbinoLeffe (loan)	2004–05	Serie B	13	4	—	—	—	—	13	4
Vicenza	2005–06	Serie B	0	0	1	0	—	—	1	0
Verona (co-own)	2005–06	Serie B	39	4	—	—	—	—	39	4
Piacenza	2006–07	Serie B	33	6	2	0	—	—	35	6
Piacenza	2007–08	Serie B	26	2	2	0	—	—	28	2
Piacenza	2008–09	Serie B	19	1	1	0	—	—	20	1
Verona	2008–09	Prima Div.	11	5	—	—	—	—	11	5
Verona	2009–10	Prima Div.	19+3	5+0	0	0	2	2	24	7
Taranto	2010–11	Prima Div.	32+2	4+0	2	0	0	0	36	4
Taranto	2011–12	Prima Div.	30+2	6+0	2	0	0	0	34	6
Perugia	2012–13	Prima Div.			3	0	4	0		
Career Total					15	0	6	2		
