= Riccardo Improta =

Italian footballer (born 1993)

Personal information
- Date of birth: 19 December 1993 (age 32)
- Place of birth: Pozzuoli, Italy
- Height: 1.79 m (5 ft 10 1/2 in)
- Positions: Winger; forward

Team information
- Current team: Giugliano
- Number: 16

Youth career
- Puteolana
- 2010–2011: Lanciano

Senior career*
Years	Team	Apps	(Gls)
2011–2012	Lanciano	10	(2)
2012	→ Genoa (loan)	0	(0)
2012–2014	Genoa	0	(0)
2012–2013	→ Juve Stabia (loan)	27	(6)
2013–2014	→ Chievo (loan)	3	(0)
2014	Chievo	0	(0)
2014	→ Padova (loan)	18	(7)
2014–2018	Genoa	0	(0)
2014–2015	→ Bologna (loan)	16	(1)
2015–2016	→ Cesena (loan)	2	(0)
2016–2017	→ Salernitana (loan)	31	(2)
2017–2018	→ Bari (loan)	36	(8)
2018–2024	Benevento	189	(16)
2024–2025	Latina	29	(1)
2025–	Giugliano	5	(0)

International career
2012	Italy U19	6	(2)
2012–2014	Italy U20	7	(3)
2012–2014	Italy U21	6	(3)
- * Club domestic league appearances and goals as of 12 January 2026

Riccardo Improta (born 19 December 1993) is an Italian professional footballer who plays as a forward for Serie C Group C club Giugliano.

His elder brothers Umberto and Giancarlo Improta are also professional footballers.

== Club career ==
Born in Pozzuoli, The Province of Naples, Campania, Riccardo Improta started his career at hometown club Puteolana. He was the member of Giovanissimi U15 team in 2007–08 season. In 2008–09 season he was the member of Allievi Fascia B U16 team. In 2009–10 season Improta promoted to Allievi U17 team. All 3 teams competed in Campania regional youth league.

In 2010 Improta left for the reserve of Lega Pro Prima Divisione team Lanciano.

=== Lanciano ===
On 2 May 2011, Improta made his first team debut against Lucchese. Riccardo replaced Alessandro Volpe at half-time, while his brother, Umberto Improta was replaced by Mario Titone. He was promoted to the first team in the 2011–12 Lega Pro Prima Divisione season, while Umberto left the club. Improta made a total of 10 appearances, seven of which were starts. On 18 January 2012, he left for Serie A club Genoa in a temporary deal.

=== Genoa ===
Improta played for the Genoa reserve team in the Campionato Nazionale Primavera. He played 9 games and scored 1 goal in the second half of the 2011–12 season. He also played in the first round of the play-offs, losing to Fiorentina.

On 22 June 2012, Genoa excised the option to sign Improta outright, for €150,000. He left for Gubbio's pre-season camp. However, he was allowed to join Juve Stabia on 4 August 2012.

On 2 July 2013, Improta left for Chievo on loan, with an option to buy. In January 2014, Chievo bought him in a co-ownership deal for a peppercorn of €500. However, he left for Padova immediately.

In June 2014, Improta returned to Genoa for an undisclosed fee.

On 1 September 2014, Improta left for Bologna.

On 18 July 2015, Improta was signed by Cesena on a temporary basis. On 19 August 2016, Improta left for Salernitana in another loan. Before he left Genoa, he was assigned the number 16 shirt.

On 11 July 2017, Improta was signed by Bari.

On 1 July 2018, Improta signed for Serie B club Benevento.

On 22 September 2024, Improta signed for Serie C club Latina.

== International career ==
Improta was capped for Italy national under-19 football team in the second half of the 2011–12 season. He scored twice in 3 games of 2012 UEFA European Under-19 Football Championship elite qualification. Along with Francesco Zampano, they scored a goal against U19 team when they represented Italy Lega Pro representative teams in December 2011. After the game they both entered U19 team.

== Career statistics ==
As of match played 22 November 2020

Club	Season	League	League		Cup		Europe		Other		Total	
Club	Season	League	Apps	Goals	Apps	Goals	Apps	Goals	Apps	Goals	Apps	Goals
Virtus Lanciano	2010–11	Lega Pro	1	0	–		–		–		1	0
Virtus Lanciano	2011–12	Lega Pro	10	2	1	0	–		–		11	2
Virtus Lanciano	Total		11	2	1	0	0	0	0	0	12	2
Juve Stabia	2012–13	Serie B	27	6	1	0	–		–		28	6
Chievo	2013–14	Serie A	3	0	2	0	–		–		5	0
Padova	2013–14	Serie B	18	7	0	0	–		–		18	7
Bologna	2014–15	Serie B	16	1	0	0	–		–		16	1
Cesena	2015–16	Serie B	2	0	0	0	–		–		2	0
Salernitana	2016–17	Serie B	31	2	0	0	–		–		31	2
Bari	2017–18	Serie B	36	8	2	0	–		–		38	8
Benevento	2018–19	Serie B	30	3	3	1	–		–		33	4
Benevento	2019–20	Serie B	33	4	1	0	–		–		34	4
Benevento	2020–21	Serie A	7	1	1	0	–		–		8	1
Benevento	Total		70	8	5	1	0	0	0	0	75	9
Career total			214	34	11	1	0	0	0	0	225	35

== Honours ==
=== Club ===
Lanciano (youth)

- Campionato Nazionale Dante Berretti Runner-up: 2011

=== Individual ===
Genoa (youth)

- Top-scorer of 2012 Torneo di Viareggio
