= 2005 Torneo di Viareggio =

2005 Torneo Mondiale di Calcio Coppa Carnevale
57° Torneo di Viareggio

Tournament details
- Host country: Italy
- City: Viareggio
- Dates: January 24, 2005 - February 7, 2005
- Teams: 40

Final positions
- Champions: (Italy) Juventus
- Runners-up: (Italy) Genoa
- Third place: (Israel) Maccabi Haifa
- Fourth place: (Italy) Inter Milan

Tournament statistics
- Matches played: 76
- Goals scored: 200 (2.63 per match)
- Top scorer: (Italy) Antonio Croce (4 goals)
- Best player: (Italy) Andrea Luci

The 2005 winners of the Torneo di Viareggio (in English, the Viareggio Tournament, officially the Viareggio Cup World Football Tournament Coppa Carnevale), the annual youth football tournament held in Viareggio, Tuscany, are listed below.

== Format ==
The 40 teams are seeded in 10 pools, split up into 5-pool groups. Each team from a pool meets the others in a single tie. The winning club from each pool and the three best runners-up from both Group A and Group B progress to the final knockout stage. All matches in the final rounds are a single tie. The Round of 16 envisions penalties and no extra time, while the rest of the final round matches include 30 minutes extra time with a Silver goal rule and penalties to be played if the draw between teams still holds. Semifinal losing teams play 3rd-place final with penalties after regular time. The winning sides play the final with extra time, no Silver goal rule and repeat the match if the draw holds.

== Participating teams ==
Italian teams

- (Italy) Atalanta
- (Italy) Benevento
- (Italy) Catania
- (Italy) Catanzaro
- (Italy) Cisco Roma
- (Italy) Cittadella
- (Italy) Empoli
- (Italy) Fiorentina
- (Italy) Genoa
- (Italy) Inter Milan
- (Italy) Juventus
- (Italy) Lazio
- (Italy) Milan
- (Italy) Modena
- (Italy) Parma
- (Italy) Perugia
- (Italy) Roma
- (Italy) Salernitana
- (Italy) Siena
- (Italy) Ternana
- (Italy) Torino
- (Italy) Venezia
- (Italy) Vicenza

European teams

- (Germany) Bayern Munich
- (Switzerland) Grasshoppers
- (Israel) Maccabi Haifa
- (Bulgaria) Naftex
- (England) Newcastle
- (Serbia) Partizan
- San Marino
- (Germany) Werder Bremen
- (Serbia) Zemun

Asian teams

- (Uzbekistan) Paxtakor

African Team

- (Zambia) Afrisports
- (Cameroon) Kadji Sports Academy

American teams

- (United States) Inter Soccer Boston
- (United States) New York Stars
- (Mexico) Necaxa
- (Mexico) Pumas

Oceanian teams

- (Australia) APIA Tigers

== Group stage ==
=== Group 1 ===
Team	Pts	Pld	W	D	L	GF	GA	GD
(Italy) Juventus	9	3	3	0	0	10	1	+9
(Serbia) Partizan	6	3	2	0	1	5	2	+3
(Italy) Catanzaro	3	3	1	0	2	5	5	0
(Australia) APIA Tigers	0	3	0	0	3	0	13	-13

=== Group 2 ===
Team	Pts	Pld	W	D	L	GF	GA	GD
(Italy) Empoli	9	3	3	0	0	6	1	+5
(Israel) Maccabi Haifa	6	3	2	0	1	6	2	+4
(Zambia) Afrisports	1	3	0	1	2	2	3	-1
(Italy) Siena	1	3	0	1	2	2	9	-7

=== Group 3 ===
Team	Pts	Pld	W	D	L	GF	GA	GD
(Italy) Roma	9	3	3	0	0	4	1	+3
(Italy) Venezia	4	3	1	1	1	2	2	0
(Italy) Cisco Roma	3	3	1	0	2	5	6	-1
(Germany) Bayern Munich	1	3	0	1	2	2	4	-2

=== Group 4 ===
Team	Pts	Pld	W	D	L	GF	GA	GD
(Italy) Genoa	7	3	2	1	0	4	1	+3
(Italy) Parma	5	3	1	2	0	6	4	+2
(Italy) Vicenza	4	3	1	1	1	4	4	0
(Mexico) Pumas	0	3	0	0	3	2	7	-5

=== Group 5 ===
Team	Pts	Pld	W	D	L	GF	GA	GD
(Italy) Inter Milan	7	3	2	1	0	5	1	+4
(Italy) Modena	6	3	2	0	1	7	5	+2
(Cameroon) Kadji Sports Academy	4	3	1	1	1	3	5	-2
(Bulgaria) Naftex	0	3	0	0	3	2	7	-5

=== Group 6 ===
Team	Pts	Pld	W	D	L	GF	GA	GD
(Germany) Werder Bremen	7	3	2	1	0	10	5	+5
(Italy) Milan	6	3	2	0	0	7	3	+4
(Italy) Ternana	4	3	1	1	1	7	5	+2
San Marino	0	3	0	0	3	1	12	-11

=== Group 7 ===
Team	Pts	Pld	W	D	L	GF	GA	GD
(Italy) Torino	7	3	2	1	0	5	3	+2
(Italy) Benevento	5	3	1	2	0	5	3	+2
(Switzerland) Grasshoppers	3	3	1	0	2	4	6	-2
(Uzbekistan) Paxtakor	1	3	0	1	0	1	3	-2

=== Group 8 ===
Team	Pts	Pld	W	D	L	GF	GA	GD
(Italy) Atalanta	9	3	3	0	0	9	0	+9
(Serbia) Zemun	6	3	2	0	1	3	4	-1
(Italy) Catania	3	3	1	0	2	2	4	-2
(United States) New York Stars	0	3	0	0	3	0	6	-6

=== Group 9 ===
Team	Pts	Pld	W	D	L	GF	GA	GD
(Italy) Cittadella	7	3	2	1	0	6	1	+5
(England) Newcastle	6	3	2	0	1	5	5	0
(Italy) Fiorentina	4	3	1	1	1	5	3	+2
(United States) Inter Soccer Boston	0	3	0	0	3	3	11	-8

=== Group 10 ===
Team	Pts	Pld	W	D	L	GF	GA	GD
(Italy) Salernitana	6	3	2	0	1	5	4	+1
(Italy) Lazio	4	3	1	1	1	5	5	0
(Italy) Perugia	4	3	1	1	1	3	3	0
(Mexico) Necaxa	3	3	1	0	2	2	3	-1

== Knockout stage ==
Round of 16
2 february
(Italy) Juventus	1
(Serbia) Zemun	0
2 february
(Italy) Roma	1
(Italy) Salernitana	2
2 february
(Italy) Inter Milan (pen)	1 (5)
(Italy) Milan	1 (4)
2 february
(Italy) Empoli	1 (5)
(England) Newcastle (pen)	1 (6)
2 february
(Italy) Torino	1
(Serbia) Partizan	0
2 february
(Italy) Atalanta	0
(Italy) Genoa	1
2 february
(Italy) Cittadella	2
(Italy) Modena	0
2 february
(Germany) Werder Bremen	0
(Israel) Maccabi Haifa	2

Quarter-finals
3 february
(Italy) Juventus	2
(Italy) Salernitana	1
3 february
(Italy) Inter Milan	2
(England) Newcastle	0
3 february
(Italy) Torino	1
(Italy) Genoa	2
3 february
(Italy) Cittadella	0
(Israel) Maccabi Haifa	1

Semi-finals
5 february
(Italy) Juventus (s.g. a.e.t.)	3
(Italy) Inter Milan	1
5 february
(Italy) Genoa	1
(Israel) Maccabi Haifa	0

Final
7 february
(Italy) Juventus	2
(Italy) Genoa	0
Third place
7 february
(Italy) Inter Milan	0 (2)
(Israel) Maccabi Haifa (pen)	0 (3)

== Champions ==
Torneo di Viareggio 2005 Champions

F.C. Juventus
5th time
