= Daniele Greco (footballer) =

Italian footballer (born 1988)

Personal information
- Date of birth: 27 April 1988 (age 38)
- Place of birth: Rome, Italy
- Height: 1.74 m (5 ft 8 1/2 in)
- Position: Midfielder

Youth career
- Lazio

Senior career*
Years	Team	Apps	(Gls)
2007–2008	Lazio	0	(0)
2007–2008	→ Gallipoli (loan)	0	(0)
2008	→ Sassuolo (loan)	1	(0)
2008–2012	Sorrento	26	(0)
2010–2011	→ Paganese (loan)	10	(0)
2012	→ Melfi (loan)	11	(0)
2012–2013	Pro Patria	19	(0)
2014	Ascoli	11	(0)

International career
2003	Italy U15	4	(0)
2003–2004	Italy U16	4	(0)
2004–2005	Italy U17	15	(1)
2007	Italy U19	4	(0)
2007	Italy U20	1	(0)
- * Club domestic league appearances and goals

Daniele Greco (born 27 April 1988) is an Italian footballer who plays as a midfielder.

== Club career ==
Born in Rome, capital of Italy (and Lazio region), Greco started his career at one of the two Serie A teams of Rome – S.S. Lazio. He was selected for various youth levels of the national team until he left the club in mid-2007. Greco, along with Lucas Correa, Matteo Merini and Simone Santarelli, were signed by Gallipoli in late July. Greco failed to play any game in 2007–08 Serie C1 until he left for Sassuolo in January 2008. He won both Serie C1 (group A) and Supercoppa di Serie C1 with Sassuolo. However, he only played once in the league and did not play in the grand final (super cup) between the two group winners.

=== Sorrento ===
Greco left for another third division club Sorrento in 2008–09 Lega Pro Prima Divisione in co-ownership deal. In June 2009, Lazio gave up the remain 50% registration rights for free after he had only played 5 times. In 2009–10 Lega Pro Prima Divisione, Greco played 20 times, including 14 starts. However, Greco left Sorrento for Paganese of the same group. Greco only played 10 times in 2010–11 Lega Pro Prima Divisione, all in the first half. Paganese were relegated at the end of the season as the last, and Sorrento finished as the runner-up of the league (originally the third before match-fixing scandal) and losing semi-finalists of promotion playoffs.

Greco was excluded from Sorrento's plan (aiming for promotion) again in the 2011–12 season. He only played once before left on loan to fourth division club Melfi. He was the second eldest player of the club at age 23, only 1 year younger than another mid-season signing Giancarlo Improta. Greco only made 4 starts from his 11 appearances. Melfi successfully avoided relegation with the young squad, and Sorrento failed to promote again as losing semi-finalists.

=== Pro Patria ===
On 31 August 2012 he left for Pro Patria.

== International career ==
Greco capped 4 times for the Italy U15 team in June 2003. He also capped 4 times for the same U17 feeder team in the whole 2003–04 season. He played 7 friendlies for the Italy national under-17 football team and played all 4 matches in the 2005 UEFA European Under-17 Football Championship. The team finished as the third. The team also went to 2005 FIFA U-17 World Championship. The club finished third in Group C and failed to quality to quarter-finals.

Greco also played twice in the 2007 UEFA European Under-19 Football Championship elite qualification. The team had a bye to the elite qualification but failed to qualify for the finals.

His last cap was for Italy national under-20 football team in 2007–08 Four Nations Tournament on 14 November 2007.
