= Viktor Budyanskiy =

Russian footballer (born 1984)

Viktor Budyansky
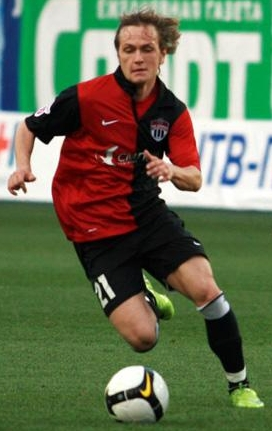
- Budyansky playing for Khimki

Personal information
- Full name: Viktor Igorevich Budyansky
- Date of birth: 12 January 1984 (age 42)
- Place of birth: Vovchansk, Ukrainian SSR, Soviet Union
- Height: 1.76 m (5 ft 9 in)
- Position: Midfielder

Youth career
- 2001–2004: Juventus

Senior career*
Years	Team	Apps	(Gls)
2004–2006	Juventus	2	(0)
2005	→ Reggina (co-ownership)	2	(0)
2005–2006	→ Avellino (loan)	28	(1)
2006–2007	Ascoli	31	(3)
2007–2012	Udinese	1	(0)
2008	→ Lecce (loan)	18	(1)
2009	→ Khimki (loan)	9	(0)
Total		91	(5)

International career
2003	Russia U19	11	(2)
2007	Russia	2	(0)
- * Club domestic league appearances and goals

Viktor Igorevich Budyansky, sometimes Boudianski (Russian: Виктор Игоревич Будянский, born 12 January 1984) is a retired association footballer who played as a midfielder. He last played for Italian club Udinese.

== Club career ==
=== Juventus and various loans ===
Budyanskiy started his Italy career at Juventus along with Ilyos Zeytulayev and Serhiy Kovalenko after a trial. He signed a five-year contract on 10 August 2001. He played his first league match for the club on 2 May 2004 against Perugia.

After graduation from youth team in June 2004, along with Ilyos Zeytulayev they were unable to register as a Juve player. At first FIGC declared that their remained two years contract did not fulfill the regulation and void them (FIGC declared that their contract was a youth contract and should be a maximum of three years) and a non-EU player at that time cannot sign a contract extension, thus they were released. But after an appeal, the appeal committee stated that a foreigner can sign a professional contract regardless his age, FIGC regulations only protected domestic youth product could only sign a contract for more than three years after 18, thus available to Juve since December.

he joined Reggina in a co-ownership deal for just €1000, along with Ilyos Zeytulayev in January 2005. In June 2005, Juventus bought back Budyanskiy for the same price (€500) and let Zeytulaev went to Reggina permanently.

In July 2005, Budyanskiy was loaned to Avellino of Serie B.

In July 2006, he was sold to Ascoli in another co-ownership deal for undisclosed fees. In June 2007, Ascoli bought the remain half for €900,000.

=== Udinese and various loans ===
In August 2007 he joined Udinese and in January 2008 left for Lecce. He played at Lecce for a year and joined Khimki in another one-year loan, along with team-mate Jani Tapani Virtanen, which also made Udinese had an extra non-EU registration quota.

In January 2010 he returned to Italy but failed to make a single appearance.

== International career ==
Born in Ukraine, Budyanskiy has Russian citizenship and played a few matches for the Russia national team at a junior level and finally debuted for the senior team on 2 June 2007 as he came in as a substitute in the match against Andorra.
