= Diogo Tavares =

Portuguese footballer

Personal information
- Full name: Diogo Filipe Conceição Tavares
- Date of birth: 27 July 1987 (age 39)
- Place of birth: Lisbon, Portugal
- Height: 1.85 m (6 ft 1 in)
- Position: Forward

Youth career
- 1995–1996: Cova Piedade
- 1997–1998: Benfica
- 1998–2006: Sporting CP

Senior career*
Years	Team	Apps	(Gls)
2006–2008	Genoa	9	(1)
2007	→ Monza (loan)	4	(1)
2007–2008	→ Lugano (loan)	20	(7)
2008–2011	Frosinone	37	(7)
2010	→ Pergocrema (loan)	14	(1)
2011	→ Ternana (loan)	11	(1)
2011–2012	Como	30	(8)
2012–2013	Santa Clara	9	(0)
2013–2015	Ancona	57	(21)
2015–2016	Messina	27	(10)
2016–2017	Catanzaro	18	(2)
2017	→ Catania (loan)	14	(1)
2017	Sicula Leonzio	12	(1)
2018	Amora	15	(5)
2019	Pinhalnovense	17	(6)
2019–2020	Oriental		
2020	Pinhalnovense		
2021	Amora		
Total		294	(72)

International career
2006	Portugal U19	9	(5)
2006–2007	Portugal U20	8	(5)
- * Club domestic league appearances and goals

Diogo Filipe Conceição Tavares (born 27 July 1987) is a Portuguese former professional footballer who plays as a forward.

== Club career ==
=== Genoa ===
Born in Lisbon, Tavares was a product of Sporting CP's prolific youth system, but never appeared professionally for its first team, moving abroad in 2006 to join Italian side Genoa CFC, where he spent two uneventful seasons which included as much loans.

He spent the 2007–08 campaign in AC Lugano in Switzerland, with the club also receiving from Genoa Alessandro Di Maio, Tiago and Rivaldo González for a total of €500,000.

=== Frosinone ===
In July 2008, Tavares was signed by Frosinone Calcio (in a co-ownership deal) for €300,000. The Serie B club used the transfer credit of Salvatore Bocchetti who joined Genoa in June for €2.3 million, in the same predicament. In January 2010 he moved to lowly U.S. Pergocrema 1932, in another loan.

In late June 2010, Tavares was bought permanently by Fronisone along with Salvatore Aurelio, as part of Robert Gucher's deal. At that time half of the registration rights of the player were valued at €800,000, while Tavares was valued at €600,000 and Gucher at €1.3 million; moreover, Selim Ben Djemia's loan had cost Fronisone €100,000 and Gucher had cost Geona €200,000, which cleared any debts for both clubs.

Tavares only appeared in one fourth of the league matches during 2010–11 and only scored once, as his team ranked 22nd and last in the second level.

=== Como ===
On 28 August 2011, Tavares left for Calcio Como as part of the deal that sent Simone Fautario in the opposite direction.
