= Alessio Ambrogetti =

Italian footballer (born 1989)

Personal information
- Date of birth: 3 January 1989 (age 37)
- Place of birth: Forlimpopoli, Italy
- Position: Winger

Team information
- Current team: Ravenna

Youth career
- –2008: Cesena

Senior career*
Years	Team	Apps	(Gls)
2007–2010	Cesena	3	(0)
2008–2009	→ Valenzana (loan)	22	(0)
2010–2011	Como	2	(0)
2011–2012	Melfi	38	(9)
2012–2013	Poggibonsi	15	(0)
2013	Fidelis Andria	2	(0)
2013–	Ravenna		
- * Club domestic league appearances and goals

Alessio Ambrogetti (born 3 January 1989) is an Italian footballer who plays as a winger for Italian fourth division club Ravenna.

== Career ==
Born in Forlimpopoli, the Province of Forlì–Cesena, Romagna, Ambrogetti started his career at Cesena. He was the member of Berretti U18 team and U20 reserve in 2006–07 season.

Ambrogetti made his debut in the last match of 2006–07 Serie B. He also played the last two rounds of 2007–08 Serie B.

After Cesena relegated at the end of season, Ambrogetti left for Valenzana. However, he was injured in pre-season and missed the first match. He was injured again in April.

Ambrogetti returned to Cesena on 1 July 2009. He was an overage player of the reserve team in 2009–10 season. In July 2010 Ambrogetti left for Calcio Como in co-ownership deal for a peppercorn fee of €500

In June 2012 Cesena gave up the remain registration rights to Como for free. Ambrogetti then left for fourth division club Melfi. He was the eldest player of the team at age 22. It was only suppressed by mid-season signing of Giancarlo Improta and Daniele Greco. Ambrogetti scored 9 goals as team-topscorer, with Improta scored 6 times in half-season.

In July 2012 he was signed by Poggibonsi.
