= 2012 Torneo di Viareggio =

2012 Viareggio Cup World Football Tournament Coppa Carnevale
64° Torneo di Viareggio

Tournament details
- Host country: Italy
- City: Viareggio
- Dates: February 6, 2012 - February 20, 2012
- Teams: 48

Final positions
- Champions: (Italy) Juventus
- Runners-up: (Italy) Roma

Tournament statistics
- Matches played: 87
- Goals scored: 251 (2.89 per match)
- Top scorer: (Italy) Riccardo Improta (6)
- Best player: (Italy) Leonardo Spinazzola

The 2012 winners of the Torneo di Viareggio (in English, the Viareggio Tournament, officially the Viareggio Cup World Football Tournament Coppa Carnevale), the annual youth football tournament held in Viareggio, Tuscany, are listed below.

== Format ==
The 48 teams are seeded in 12 pools, split up into 6-pool groups. Each team from a pool meets the others in a single tie. The winning club from each pool and two best runners-up from both group A and group B progress to the final knockout stage. All matches in the final rounds are single tie. The Round of 16 after envisions penalties and no extra time, while the rest of the final round matches include 30 minutes extra time and penalties to be played if the draw between teams still holds.

== Participating teams ==
Italian teams

- (Italy) Arzanese
- (Italy) Atalanta
- (Italy) Cesena
- (Italy) A.S.D. Città di Marino
- (Italy) Empoli
- (Italy) Fiorentina
- (Italy) Genoa
- (Italy) Inter Milan
- (Italy) Juventus
- (Italy) Lazio
- (Italy) Milan
- (Italy) Modena
- (Italy) Napoli
- (Italy) Palermo
- (Italy) Parma
- (Italy) Poggibonsi
- (Italy) Serie D Representatives
- (Italy) Reggina
- (Italy) Roma
- (Italy) Sambenedettese
- (Italy) Sampdoria
- (Italy) Sassuolo
- (Italy) Siena
- (Italy) Spezia
- (Italy) Torino
- (Italy) Varese
- (Italy) Viareggio
- (Italy) Vicenza
- (Italy) Entella

European teams

- (Belgium) Anderlecht
- (Belgium) Bruges
- (Czech Republic) Dukla Prague
- (Hungary) Honvéd
- (Denmark) Nordsjaelland
- (Russia) Spartak Moscow
- (Norway) Stabaek

Asian teams

- (Qatar) Aspire
- (Uzbekistan) Paxtakor

American teams

- (United States) L.I.A.C. New York
- (Paraguay) Guaraní Asunción
- (Paraguay) Nacional Asunción
- (Brazil) Grêmio Osasco
- (Brazil) Juventude
- (Brazil) Olé Brasil
- (Mexico) Santos Laguna
- (Mexico) Pumas
- (Uruguay) Wanderers

Oceanian teams

- (Australia) APIA Leichhardt

== Group stage ==
=== Group A ===
==== Pool 1 ====
Team	Pts	Pld	W	D	L	GF	GA	GD
(Italy) Inter Milan	7	3	2	1	0	5	2	+3
(Belgium) Anderlecht	3	3	0	3	0	3	3	0
(Italy) Siena	2	3	0	2	1	2	3	-1
(Italy) Reggina	2	3	0	2	1	1	3	-2

==== Pool 2 ====
Team	Pts	Pld	W	D	L	GF	GA	GD
(Italy) Atalanta	9	3	3	0	0	8	0	+8
(Qatar) Aspire	4	3	1	1	1	8	5	+3
(Brazil) Juventude	4	3	1	1	1	5	5	0
(Italy) Viareggio	0	3	0	0	3	2	13	-11

==== Pool 3 ====
Team	Pts	Pld	W	D	L	GF	GA	GD
(Italy) Genoa	9	3	3	0	0	11	0	+11
(Italy) Poggibonsi	6	3	2	0	1	4	2	+2
(Uruguay) Wanderers	3	3	1	0	2	5	5	0
(United States) L.I.A.C. New York	0	3	0	0	3	2	15	-13

==== Pool 4 ====
Team	Pts	Pld	W	D	L	GF	GA	GD
(Italy) Juventus	9	3	3	0	0	8	1	+7
(Denmark) Nordsjaelland	6	3	2	0	1	11	6	+5
(Australia) APIA Leichhardt	1	3	0	1	2	0	6	-6
(Italy) A.S.D. Città di Marino	1	3	0	1	2	0	6	-6

==== Pool 5 ====
Team	Pts	Pld	W	D	L	GF	GA	GD
(Italy) Empoli	5	3	1	2	0	3	0	+3
(Uzbekistan) Paxtakor	5	3	1	2	0	4	3	+1
(Italy) Arzanese	3	3	0	3	0	5	5	0
(Hungary) Honvéd	1	3	0	1	2	2	6	-4

==== Pool 6 ====
Team	Pts	Pld	W	D	L	GF	GA	GD
(Italy) Sampdoria	7	3	2	1	0	7	2	+5
(Mexico) Pumas	7	3	2	1	0	5	3	+2
(Italy) Spezia	1	3	0	1	2	4	7	-3
(Czech Republic) Dukla Prague	1	3	0	1	2	3	7	-4

=== Group B ===
==== Pool 7 ====
Team	Pts	Pld	W	D	L	GF	GA	GD
(Italy) Torino	6	3	2	0	1	6	3	+3
(Russia) Spartak Moscow	6	3	2	0	1	6	3	+3
(Brazil) Olé Brasil	3	3	1	0	2	4	8	-4
(Italy) Sambenedettese	3	3	1	0	2	2	4	-2

==== Pool 8 ====
Tema	Pts	Pld	W	D	L	GF	GA	GD
(Italy) Fiorentina	7	3	2	1	0	8	2	+6
(Italy) Vicenza	7	3	2	1	0	5	2	+3
(Italy) Cesena	3	3	1	0	2	2	4	-2
(Norway) Stabaek	0	3	0	0	3	1	8	-7

==== Pool 9 ====
Team	Pts	Pld	W	D	L	GF	GA	GD
(Italy) Parma	7	3	1	1	0	7	1	+6
(Italy) Milan	6	3	2	0	1	6	4	+2
(Brazil) Grêmio Osasco	3	3	1	0	2	3	6	-3
(Italy) Modena	1	3	0	1	2	1	6	-5

==== Pool 10 ====
Team	Pts	Pld	W	D	L	GF	GA	GD
(Italy) Roma	6	3	2	0	1	9	5	+4
(Mexico) Santos Laguna	4	3	1	1	1	3	2	+1
(Italy) Entella	4	3	1	1	1	7	10	-3
(Paraguay) Nacional Asunción	3	3	1	0	2	4	6	-2

==== Pool 11 ====
Team	Pts	Pld	W	D	L	GF	GA	GD
(Italy) Lazio	7	3	2	1	0	5	2	+3
(Paraguay) Guaraní Asunción	6	3	2	0	1	6	3	+3
(Italy) Sassuolo	3	3	1	0	2	2	4	-2
(Italy) Palermo	1	3	0	1	2	2	6	-4

==== Pool 12 ====
Team	Pts	Pld	W	D	L	GF	GA	GD
(Italy) Serie D Repress.	7	3	2	1	0	7	2	+5
(Belgium) Bruges	6	3	2	0	1	4	3	+1
(Italy) Varese	3	3	1	0	2	7	7	0
(Italy) Napoli	1	3	0	1	2	2	8	-6

== Final Rounds ==
Round of 16
14 February (15:00 CET)
(Italy) Fiorentina	0 (3)
(Italy) Empoli	0 (0)
14 February (15:00 CET)
(Italy) Lazio	3
(Denmark) Nordsjaelland	0
14 February (15:00 CET)
(Italy) Atalanta	1
(Italy) Roma	3
14 February (15:00 CET)
(Italy) Serie D Repres.	1 (4)
(Mexico) Pumas	1 (3)
14 February (15:00 CET)
(Italy) Juventus	1 (5)
(Italy) Vicenza	1 (3)
14 February (15:00 CET)
(Italy) Sampdoria	0 (0)
(Paraguay) Guaraní Asunción	0 (2)
14 February (17:15 CET)
(Italy) Genoa	0
(Italy) Torino	2
14 February (15:00 CET)
(Italy) Parma	1 (4)
(Italy) Inter Milan	1 (1)

Quarter-finals
16 February (15:00 CET)
(Italy) Fiorentina (a.e.t.)	3
(Italy) Lazio	1
16 February (15:00 CET)
(Italy) Roma	2
(Italy) Serie D Repres.	0
16 February (17:15 CET)
(Italy) Juventus	3
(Paraguay) Guaraní Asunción	1
16 February (15:00 CET)
(Italy) Torino	0
(Italy) Parma	3

Semi-finals
18 February (17:15 CET)
(Italy) Fiorentina	1 (3)
(Italy) Roma	1 (5)
18 February (15:00 CET)
(Italy) Juventus	1
(Italy) Parma	0

Final
20 February (15:00 CET)
(Italy) Roma	1
(Italy) Juventus	2

== Champions ==
Torneo di Viareggio 2012 Champions

Juventus FC
8th time

== Top goal scorers ==
6 goals

- (Italy) Riccardo Improta ( (Italy) Genoa)

4 goals

- (Italy) Gianmario Comi ( (Italy) Milan)
- (Italy) Daniele Grandi ( (Italy) Atalanta)
- (Denmark) Nichlas Rohde ( (Denmark) Nordsjaelland)
- (Uruguay) Maxi Rodríguez ( (Uruguay) Wanderers)
