= Domenico Germinale =

Italian footballer (born 1987)

Personal information
- Date of birth: 3 June 1987 (age 39)
- Place of birth: Treviso, Italy
- Height: 1.83 m (6 ft 0 in)
- Position: Forward

Team information
- Current team: Fossombrone

Youth career
- 1994–1997: Silea
- 1997–2001: Treviso
- 2001–2006: Inter Milan

Senior career*
Years	Team	Apps	(Gls)
2006–2008	Inter Milan	1	(0)
2006–2007	→ Pizzighettone (loan)	11	(1)
2007	→ Torres (loan)	7	(0)
2007–2008	→ Cittadella (loan)	8	(2)
2008–2009	Foggia	24	(9)
2009–2013	Benevento	45	(5)
2011	→ Como (loan)	13	(5)
2011–2012	→ AlbinoLeffe (loan)	22	(3)
2013–2014	Catanzaro	25	(4)
2014–2015	SPAL	18	(5)
2015	Alessandria	13	(1)
2015–2016	Bassano Virtus	11	(4)
2016–2017	Padova	18	(0)
2017–2018	Fano	48	(14)
2018–2019	Pordenone	24	(3)
2019–2021	Cavese	33	(7)
2021	Vis Pesaro	11	(0)
2021–2022	Rimini	25	(5)
2022–2024	Fossombrone	9	(3)
2024	Aurora Treia	9	(2)
2024–	Lunano	35	(7)
- * Club domestic league appearances and goals as of 25 aprile 2026

Domenico Germinale (born 3 June 1987) is an Italian footballer who plays as a forward for Promozione club Lunano.

== Career ==
=== Inter and loans ===
Born in Treviso, Germinale started his career at Silea Calcio, located at Silea, the Province of Treviso. He then played for Treviso F.B.C. 1993 before joined Inter Milan, which he supported at young age. He played the pre-season TIM Trophy in 2004 and a 6 more friendly appearances in 2005 Germinale finally made his official debut on 14 May 2006, the last match of the Serie A season, which he substituted Pierre Womé in the 58 minutes. The match ended in 2–2 draw with Cagliari.

In summer 2006, he was loaned to AS PizzighettonePizzighettone. After an unsuccessful half-season, he was loaned to Torres. In 2007–08 season, he was loaned to Serie C1 side Cittadella, re-joining Riccardo Meggiorini.

=== Foggia ===
In July 2008, he signed a 1+2-year contract with Foggia on free transfer. At Foggia, he finally scored regularly at Lega Pro Prima Divisione Group B.

=== Benevento ===
On 31 August 2009, Germinale transferred to Benevento of Prima Divisione Group A, signed a reported 3-year contract. Germinale seldom included in the starting XI, and on 31 January 2011 left for Como along with Walter Zullo. In the half season Germinale made 13 starts and 5 goals.

On 31 August 2011 Germinale was sold to Serie B struggler AlbinoLeffe in temporary deal with option to purchase half of the registration rights (which Germinale now had a contract with Benevento to 30 June 2014 at that time), replacing the left of former Inter team-mate Matteo Momentè. Benevento also acquired Michael Cia in the same formula. Germinale took no.7 shirt previously owned by Cia.

Germinale returned to Benevento for 2012–13 Lega Pro Prima Divisione season, which he scored 5 times. On 21 May 2013 he was released.

=== Serie C ===
On 19 July 2013 he was signed by Catanzaro in 1+1 year contract. He scored 4 times in 2013–14 Lega Pro Prima Divisione. He also scored once against former club Benevento in promotion playoffs, losing 1–2.

On 30 June 2014 he was signed by SPAL. On 26 January 2015 he was swapped with defender Andrea Pappaianni of Alessandria in a 5-month contract.

On 31 August 2015 he was hired by Bassano Virtus; playing only a few games because of a knee injury. At the end of the season it is not confirmed, and accords with the Padova. On 31 January 2017 is made official his move, outright, to Fano.

On 2 September 2019, he signed with Cavese.

On 1 February 2021, he joined Vis Pesaro on a 1.5-year contract. On 24 July 2021, the contract was terminated by mutual consent.

On 3 September 2021 he moved to Rimini in Serie D.

== International career ==
Germinale never played for Italy youths team officially but received an Azzurri U18 call-up against Juniores League Best XI along with team-mate Matteo Momentè and Giacomo Bindi in 2006. The unofficial match Azzurrini won Juniores Best XI 3–1, the two Inter strikers scored 1 goal each.

== Honors and awards ==
- Primavera Cup: 2006
