= Simone Malacarne =

Italian footballer

Personal information
- Date of birth: 23 February 1989 (age 37)
- Position: Defender

Team information
- Current team: Treviso

Youth career
- Milan

Senior career*
Years	Team	Apps	(Gls)
2008–2009	Pizzighettone	29	(1)
2009–2011	Cremonese	10	(1)
2010–2011	→ Viareggio (loan)	18	(0)
2011–	Treviso		

International career
2005	Italy U-17	1	(0)
2009	Italy U-21 Lega Pro	1	(0)
- * Club domestic league appearances and goals

Simone Malacarne (born 23 February 1989) is an Italian footballer who plays for Treviso.

== Biography ==
Malacarne started his career at A.C. Milan. He then moved to Pizzighettone and then Cremonese. On 23 July 2010 he was loaned to Viareggio. He only played 18 times in regular season but started in both legs of the relegation playoffs. He also played 4 times in the cup.

In July 2011 he was signed by Treviso.
