= Tiago Pires (footballer) =

Portuguese footballer (born 1987)

Personal information
- Full name: Tiago Filipe dos Santos Pires
- Date of birth: 2 January 1987 (age 39)
- Place of birth: Lisbon, Portugal
- Height: 1.87 m (6 ft 2 in)
- Position: Defender

Youth career
- 1996–2006: Sporting CP
- 2006–2007: Genoa

Senior career*
Years	Team	Apps	(Gls)
2007–2009	Genoa	0	(0)
2007–2008	→ Lugano (loan)	4	(1)
2008–2009	→ Potenza (loan)	9	(0)
2009–2010	Operário	17	(1)
2010–2011	Juventude Évora	13	(0)
2011–2012	Atlético Reguengos	21	(1)
2012–2013	União Leiria	23	(0)
2013–2014	Naval	1	(0)
2014–2015	Vallemaggia		

International career
2004–2005	Portugal U18	6	(0)
- * Club domestic league appearances and goals as of 10 July 2016

Tiago Filipe dos Santos Pires (born 2 January 1987) is a Portuguese professional footballer who plays as a defender.

== Club career ==
=== Italy ===
Born in Lisbon, Pires spent ten years at the Sporting Clube de Portugal academy, but could never represent the club as a senior. He signed with Italian side Genoa C.F.C. in the 2006 summer, but was limited to reserve team football during his spell, also being loaned to AC Lugano in the Swiss Challenge League along with Alessandro Di Maio, Rivaldo González and Diogo Tavares and to Potenza S.C. alongside José Mamede.

Tiago was an unused substitute for Potenza at the start of 2008–09 season.

=== Portugal ===
Pires returned to his country in the 2009 off-season, going on to have one-season spells in the third division with CD Operário, Juventude Sport Clube, Atlético SC, U.D. Leiria and Associação Naval 1º de Maio. He moved back to Switzerland in 2014, joining amateurs (sixth level) AC Vallemaggia.
