= Michele Ischia =

Italian footballer (born 1978)

Personal information
- Date of birth: 5 March 1978 (age 48)
- Place of birth: Rovereto, Italy
- Positions: Right-back; centre-back

Senior career*
| Years | Team | Apps | (Gls) |
| 1995–1998 | Arco | 60 | (3) |
| 1998–1999 | Trento | 26 | (0) |
| 1999–2004 | Vis Pesaro | 131 | (2) |
| 2004–2005 | Palazzolo (sull'Oglio) | 16 | (1) |
| 2005–2009 | Frosinone | 94 | (4) |
| 2008–2009 | → Cavese (loan) | 28 | (0) |
| 2009–2010 | Rimini | 17 | (0) |
| 2010–2011 | Barletta | 20 | (1) |
| 2011–2012 | Lecco | 28 | (1) |
| 2012–2013 | Pergine | | |
| 2013–2017 | Dro Alto Garda | | |
| 2018–2020 | Dro Alto Garda | | |
| 2020–2022 | Arco | | |

Managerial career
- 2017–2019: Dro Alto Garda
- * Club domestic league appearances and goals

Michele Ischia (born 5 March 1978) is an Italian former footballer who played as a defender. Ischia could play right-back or centre-back, having spent most of his career in Italian Lega Pro.

== Biography ==
Born in Rovereto, Trentino, Ischia started his career at hometown club Arco, located in the comune of the same name. He then moved Trento, his first professional club.

=== Frosinone ===
Ischia terminated his contract with Palazzolo in January 2005 and joined Frosinone. He was the right back of the team and extended his contract in June. He won the promotion playoffs in 2006. He played to more season with the club in Serie B before left on loan to Cavese in 2008.

=== Return to Lega Pro ===
In 2009, he was sold to Rimini, to exchange with Migjen Basha.

In October 2010, he left for Barletta as free agent, where he played as a centre-back. In the next season he was signed by Lecco.
