= Ciro Improta =

Italian footballer (born 1991)

Personal information
- Date of birth: 23 February 1991 (age 35)
- Place of birth: Naples
- Position: Midfielder

Team information
- Current team: Arzanese

Youth career
- 2005–2008: Damiano Promotion Soccer

Senior career*
| Years | Team | Apps | (Gls) |
| 2009–2010 | Pianura | 8 | (1) |
| 2010– | Arzanese | 63 | (3) |
- * Club domestic league appearances and goals

Ciro Improta (born 23 February 1991) is an Italian footballer who plays for Italian fourth division club Arzanese.

== Biography ==
Ciro Improta started his career at Damiano Promotion Soccer. He played for its Giovanissimi team to Allievi B U16 and Allievi A U17 team in 2006–07 and 2007–08 season respectively.

Improta made his senior debut with Pianura in 2009–10 Serie D. The team bankrupted in 2010. In 2010 Improta left for Arzanese and won promotion to professional league as the winner of Group H of 2010–11 Serie D. He was infamously booked 9 times.

Improta played 32 times in 2011–12 Lega Pro Seconda Divisione but booked 9 times again.

Improta was also selected to 2012 Lega Pro Quadrangular Tournament. for 2nd Division Group B of Lega Pro. The team finished as the runner-up.

== Honours ==
- Serie D: 2011
