= Mattia Piras =

Italian footballer

Personal information
- Date of birth: 22 January 1992 (age 34)
- Place of birth: Crema, Italy
- Height: 1.75 m (5 ft 9 in)
- Position: Midfielder

Team information
- Current team: USD Soncinese

Youth career
- –2009: Pergocrema
- 2008–2009: → AlbinoLeffe (loan)
- 2009–2011: Genoa

Senior career*
Years	Team	Apps	(Gls)
2011–2013	SPAL	27	(3)
2013	Crema		
2013–2014	Fanfulla		
2014	US Offanenghese		
2014–2016	Fanfulla		
2016–2019	Pergolettese	86	(5)
2019	Sant'Angelo		
2019–2022	US Offanenghese		
2022–	USD Soncinese		
- * Club domestic league appearances and goals as of 00:37, 10 February 2026 (UTC)

Mattia Piras (born 22 January 1992) is an Italian footballer who plays as a midfielder for USD Soncinese.

== Biography ==
=== Youth career ===
Born in Crema, Lombardy, Piras started his career at hometown club PergoCrema. He was the member of Giovanissimi Regionali under-15 team in 2006–07 season; both Allievi Regionali U-16 team and Allievi Nazionali under-17 team in 2007–08 season. In August 2008, Piras left for AlbinoLeffe. He was a member of the Allievi Nazionali under-17 team that season. Piras also received his only call-up from Italy national team in February 2009, for the U-17 team. On 11 August 2009, Piras was signed by Genoa in a co-ownership deal for €100,000. Piras was a member of Berretti under-20 team (or under-18 team), the B team of U-20 age group. Piras was a member of Primavera under-20 team in 2010–11 season, but only made 11 starts (out of 26 games) Piras was a midfielder for the team in 4–3–3 formation, such as in 2010–11 Coppa Italia Primavera against Internazionale.

=== Senior career ===
In June 2011, Pergocrema gave up the remaining 50% registration rights of Piras to Genoa for free. In July 2011, Piras was transferred to Lega Pro Prima Divisione club SPAL in another co-ownership deal, for a peppercorn fee of €500, rejoining former Leffe teammate Andrea Beduschi. Despite a member of Berretti under-19 team as overage player, he also played for SPAL first team in Coppa Italia Lega Pro.

Piras also selected to the prima divisione Group A under-21 representative team, for 2012 the Lega Pro Quadrangular Tournament. Prima Divisione Group A team won that tournament, and Piras was in the starting XI in the final despite being replaced by Marcello Falzerano at half-time.

Piras joined Sant'Angelo ahead of the 2019/20 season. In December 2019, he moved to Eccellenza club US Offanenghese.
