= Nicola Ciotola =

Italian footballer (born 1984)

Personal information
- Date of birth: 28 March 1984 (age 42)
- Place of birth: Benevento, Italy
- Height: 1.74 m (5 ft 9 in)
- Position: Winger

Youth career
- –2003: Monteruscello
- 2003–2004: Sassari Torres

Senior career*
Years	Team	Apps	(Gls)
2004–2006	Giugliano	42	(5)
2006–2008	Pisa	43	(4)
2008–2009	Avellino	30	(5)
2009–2012	Verona	31	(2)
2010–2011	→ Taranto (loan)	14	(1)
2011	→ Juve Stabia (loan)	4	(0)
2011–2012	→ Como (loan)	31	(3)
2012–2015	L'Aquila	40	(3)
2014	→ Sassari (loan)	13	(1)
2014–2015	→ Ischia (loan)	30	(8)
2015–2016	Casertana	9	(0)
2016	Martina Franca	3	(1)
2016–2017	Casertana	29	(6)
2017–2018	Racing Fondi	23	(0)
2018–2019	Avellino	35	(6)
- * Club domestic league appearances and goals as of 1 July 2019

Nicola Ciotola (born 28 March 1984) is an Italian footballer.

== Career ==
Ciotola began his career at local club Monteruscello. In 2003, he joined Napoli, but was immediately sold to Sassari Torres in a co-ownership deal. In June, Sassari Torres acquired him outright. He then left for Giugliano and then Pisa. He followed the team through promotion to Serie B as 2006–07 Serie C1 playoffs winners.

After Pisa's relegation at the end of season, Ciotola joined newly promoted Serie B team Avellino in another co-ownership deal. Despite the team's relegation, Avellino purchased the remaining half of his rights. However, the team soon fell to bankruptcy.

In July 2009, Ciotola joined Verona on a three-year contract. He played 31 out of 34 games, but only started a handful of times. In July 2010, he left for Taranto along with teammate Julien Rantier.

On 17 January 2011, Ciotola left for Juve Stabia. He made his debut in the 2010–11 Coppa Italia Lega Pro campaign. Juve Stabia beat Taranto in the cup earlier that season, but Ciotola did not make an appearance.

At the end of season, both Verona and Juve Stabia promoted to Serie B. Ciotola remained in the Italian third division for Como. He made his debut on 11 September.

On 31 July 2012, Ciotola joined L'Aquila on a two-year contract.

== Honors ==
- Coppa Italia Lega Pro (1): 2011
