= Marco Cellini =

Italian footballer (born 1981)

Personal information
- Date of birth: 19 May 1981 (age 45)
- Place of birth: Florence, Italy
- Height: 1.70 m (5 ft 7 in)
- Position: Forward

Team information
- Current team: Grassina (head coach)

Senior career*
Years	Team	Apps	(Gls)
1998–2002	Prato	52	(3)
1999–2000	→ Fucecchio (loan)	26	(6)
2002–2004	Montevarchi	54	(7)
2004–2005	Foggia	33	(12)
2005–2006	Triestina	0	(0)
2005–2006	→ Perugia (loan)	32	(16)
2006–2010	AlbinoLeffe	128	(45)
2010–2012	Varese	38	(7)
2011	→ Vicenza (loan)	14	(1)
2012	→ Modena (loan)	13	(7)
2012–2013	Juve Stabia	27	(2)
2013–2015	Carrarese	58	(27)
2015–2016	SPAL	28	(18)
2016–2017	Livorno	18	(11)
2017–2018	Arezzo	14	(2)
2018–2019	Pistoiese	24	(1)
2019–2021	Prato	28	(9)

Managerial career
- 2022–: Grassina
- * Club domestic league appearances and goals

Marco Cellini (born 19 May 1981) is an Italian former footballer who played as a forward, and current head coach of Promozione amateurs Grassina.

== Playing career ==
Born in the Campo di Marte Florence neighbourhood, next to the local Artemio Franchi stadium, Cellini started his career with Serie C2 team Prato, where he played until 2002 (except for a one-year loan at amateur team Fucecchio in 1999–2000). In 2002, he moved to Montevarchi, another Tuscan Serie C2 club, where he spent two seasons. In 2004, he signed for Serie C1 team Foggia, and scored 12 goals in his season with the satanelli. He moved to ambitious side Perugia the next season, scoring 16 goals in 32 matches with the grifoni.

In the 2006 summer window, Cellini signed for Serie B minnows U.C. AlbinoLeffe, where he scored seven goals in his first season with the Lombardians. In the following season, he proved to be a protagonist of his side's surprising season start, helping AlbinoLeffe to top the league table scoring 11 goals in the initial 14 matches, that season AlbinoLeffe finished 4th, the best result in recent seasons.

In January 2008, he extended his contract to 30 June 2010.

In July 2010 he left for newly promoted side Varese, signed a reported 2-year contract, which Varese also loaned their striker Matteo Momentè to AlbinoLeffe.

On 31 January 2011, he was swapped with Alemão of Vicenza.

== Coaching career ==
On 25 October 2022, Cellini took on his first managerial role, becoming new head coach of Tuscan Promozione amateur club Grassina.
