= Giancarlo Improta =

Italian footballer (born 1987)

Personal information
- Date of birth: 15 April 1987 (age 39)
- Place of birth: Naples, Italy
- Height: 1.79 m (5 ft 10 in)
- Position: Forward

Team information
- Current team: Turris

Youth career
- Cisco Roma

Senior career*
Years	Team	Apps	(Gls)
2005–2007	Cisco Roma	1	(0)
2006	→ Fermana (loan)	13	(0)
2006–2007	→ Cassino (loan)	21	(6)
2007–2008	Carpenedolo	7	(0)
2008–2009	Aversa	7	(1)
2009	Giulianova	3	(1)
2009–2010	Agnonese	10	(2)
2010–2011	Fondi	29	(12)
2011	Neapolis	12	(3)
2011–2012	Isola Liri	20	(5)
2012–2013	Melfi	27	(8)
2013–2014	Sorrento	23	(1)
2014–2015	Neapolis	29	(19)
2015–2016	Jolly Montemurlo	31	(13)
2016	Sicula Leonzio	5	(0)
2016–2017	Turris	18	(6)
2017	San Severo	5	(0)
2018–	Turris	0	(0)
- * Club domestic league appearances and goals as of 20 December 2017

Giancarlo Improta (born 15 April 1987) is an Italian footballer who plays as a forward for Turris.

His brothers Umberto and Riccardo Improta were also professional footballers.

== Career ==
=== Cisco Roma and Carpenedolo ===
Born in Naples, Campania, Southern Italy, Improta was a youth product of Cisco Roma, located in Rome, Lazio, Central Italy. Since January 2006 Improta left on loan to other Serie C clubs, namely Fermana (2005–06 Serie C1) and Lazio club Cassino (2006–07 Serie C2). In July 2007 Improta was signed by Carpenedolo.

=== Between Southern Italy and Lazio teams ===
In 2008 Improta returned Campania for Aversa. In January 2009 he was signed by another southern Italy team Giulianova. However, he was unable to play regular either, as the presence of Umberto Improta. In 2009 G.Improta left for another southern side, Serie D (non-professional) club Agnonese, located in one of the smallest region of Italy, Molise.

In January 2010 G.Improta left for another Serie D club Fondi of Lazio. Improta won 2009–10 Serie D Group G and promoted. In January 2011 Improta returned to Campania again for Neapolis. At the start of 2011–12 Lega Pro Seconda Divisione, Improta swing back to Lazio region for Isola Liri. In January 2012 Improta shifted back to southern Italy again, for Melfi. The team was composited with youngster ranged from born 1989 to 1992 players, with a few exception (Simone Simeri (born 1993) and Daniele Greco (born 1988)). Improta was the eldest player of the team and scored 6 goals for the team, behind Alessio Ambrogetti as team second top-scorer. He was the most senior player of the team in 2012–13 season until the arrival of Antonio Croce in January 2013.
