= Omar Torri =

Italian footballer

Personal information
- Date of birth: 30 March 1982 (age 44)
- Place of birth: Trescore Balneario, Italy
- Height: 1.88 m (6 ft 2 in)
- Position: Striker

Team information
- Current team: Monza

Youth career
- 1998–2000: Milan

Senior career*
Years	Team	Apps	(Gls)
2000–2003	Alzano Virescit	36	(3)
2003–2005	Biellese	48	(5)
2005–2006	Palazzolo	31	(15)
2006–2007	USO Calcio	20	(14)
2007–2008	AlbinoLeffe	1	(0)
2008	→ Pavia (loan)	12	(9)
2008–2009	→ Monza (loan)	30	(12)
2009–2012	AlbinoLeffe	68	(19)
2012–2013	→ Lumezzane (loan)	16	(4)
2013–2014	Cuneo	26	(11)
2014	Real Vicenza	9	(3)
2014–2015	Pro Piacenza	13	(1)
2015–	Monza	2	(0)
- * Club domestic league appearances and goals

Omar Torri (born 30 March 1982 in Trescore Balneario) is an Italian professional football player. Currently, he plays for Monza.

== Football career ==
On 3 July 2007, he was signed by Serie B side AlbinoLeffe in 3-year contract from Serie D side USO Calcio. In the first season, he wrote no.8 shirt.

On 30 January 2008, he was loaned to Serie C2 side Pavia. On 29 August 2008 he left for Lega Pro Prima Divisione side Monza.

Since the departure of Francesco Ruopolo and Marco Cellini, Torri had more chance to play. At the opening match of 2010–11 season, Torri partnered with Leandro Antonio Martínez and Karamoko Cissé, which Torri scored twice and Cissé scored once, helped AlbinoLeffe beat fellow Serie B club Pescara 3–1 in Coppa Italia.

On 2 September 2010, he signed a new 4-year contract with AlbinoLeffe.

On 21 August 2012, he joined Lumezzane on loan. But in January 2013, he left for Cuneo.

On 29 January 2014, goes to the Real Vicenza.

On 29 July 2014, goes to the Pro Piacenza.

On 14 January 2015, returns after six years at Monza
