= Mirko Martucci =

Swiss-born Italian footballer

Personal information
- Date of birth: 19 February 1988 (age 38)
- Place of birth: Liestal, Switzerland
- Height: 1.69 m (5 ft 7 in)
- Position: Midfielder

Youth career
- 2006–2008: Genoa

Senior career*
Years	Team	Apps	(Gls)
2005–2006	Alessandria	23	(5)
2006–2008	Genoa	0	(0)
2008–2010	SPAL	15	(0)
2009–2010	→ Viareggio (loan)	19	(1)
2010–2011	Cosenza	2	(0)
2011–2013	Acqui		
- * Club domestic league appearances and goals

Mirko Martucci (born 19 February 1988) is an Italian footballer.

== Biography ==
Born in Liestal, Basel-Landschaft, Switzerland, Martucci started his career at Italian Serie D team Alessandria and in 2006 left for Genoa youth team. In July 2008 he left for Arezzo but he then left for SPAL along with Rivaldo González, in co-ownership deal for a peppercorn fee of €500 each (€1,000 in total). In June 2010 Genoa gave up the remain 50% registration rights to SPAL. He also spent 2009–10 season at Viareggio. On 31 August 2010 he joined Cosenza.
