= Rivaldo González =

Paraguayan-Spanish footballer (born 1987)

Personal information
- Full name: Rivaldo González Kiese
- Date of birth: 23 December 1987 (age 38)
- Place of birth: Asunción, Paraguay
- Height: 1.70 m (5 ft 7 in)
- Position: Attacking midfielder

Youth career
- Venezia
- 2005–2006: Genoa

Senior career*
Years	Team	Apps	(Gls)
2004–2005	Venezia	12	(0)
2005–2008	Genoa	9	(0)
2006–2007	→ Avellino (loan)	14	(0)
2007–2008	→ Lugano (loan)	11	(2)
2008	→ Potenza (loan)	12	(1)
2008–2009	SPAL	7	(0)
2009–2010	Gubbio	32	(1)
2011	Patronato	6	(0)
2011–2013	Bari	17	(0)
2015	Deportivo Capiatá	0	(0)
2015–	Guayaquil City		
- * Club domestic league appearances and goals

Rivaldo González Kiese (born 23 December 1987) is a Paraguayan football player who plays for Guayaquil City Fútbol Club in Ecuador's 2nd Division.

Rivaldo also holds Spanish nationality. He is an attacking midfielder.

== Career ==
Born in Asunción, the capital of Paraguay, Rivaldo transferred to Italy at young age. Despite being young, he played for the first team of Venezia. After the club was bankrupted, he left for Genoa. That season, he played 9 times in the 2005–06 Serie C1. The club finished as runner-up, winning the promotion playoffs. In August 2006 he left, along with Michele Bacis and Stefano De Angelis.

In 2007, he left for Challenge League club Lugano, from the Italian speaking region of Switzerland. Genoan teammates Tiago Pires, Alessandro Di Maio and Diogo Tavares also joined this club.

In January 2008 he returned to Italy to play for Potenza.

In August 2008 he left Potenza for SPAL along with Mirko Martucci in a co-ownership deal for a peppercorn fee of €500 each (€1,000 in total). He played 7 games before Genoa gave up the remaining 50% registration rights to SPAL, which caused Genoa to register a financial loss of €500 in 2009 financial year, as the revenue of the other half was already booked into the 2008 financial year.

In 2009, he left for Lega Pro Seconda Divisione club Gubbio, rejoining former Venice teammate Rodrigue Boisfer. The club won the promotion playoffs and was promoted.

He returned to South America and played 6 times for Patronato in 2010–11 Clausura season of Primera B Nacional.

Rivaldo subsequently returned to Italy for the second division club; Bari in July 2011, signing a 2-year contract. He also re-joined former Gubbio coach Vincenzo Torrente.
