= Mario Titone =

Italian footballer

Personal information
- Date of birth: 14 October 1988 (age 38)
- Place of birth: Erice, Italy
- Height: 1.70 m (5 ft 7 in)
- Position: Forward

Team information
- Current team: Recanatese

Youth career
- 2005–2006: Sansovino
- 2006–2008: Pisa

Senior career*
Years	Team	Apps	(Gls)
2005–2006	Sansovino	10	(0)
2007–2008	Pisa	7	(1)
2008–2009	Sambenedettese	24	(1)
2009–2011	Sassuolo	20	(1)
2011–2012	Lanciano	27	(3)
2013	Ceahlăul	3	(0)
2013–2014	Bisceglie	11	(5)
2014–2015	Robur Siena	33	(12)
2015–2016	Sambenedettese	32	(19)
2016	Piacenza	15	(2)
2016–2017	Matelica	8	(4)
2017–2018	Imolese	24	(7)
2018–2019	Aprilia Racing	26	(4)
2019	Montegiorgio Calcio	10	(3)
2019–	Recanatese	11	(4)

International career
2009	Italy U20 Lega Pro	1	(0)
- * Club domestic league appearances and goals as of 20:51, 9 April 2020 (UTC)

Mario Titone (born 14 October 1988) is an Italian footballer, who currently plays as a forward for U.S.D. Recanatese 1923.

== Club career ==
Born in Erice, Sicily, Titone started his professional career with Tuscany club Sansovino. After played once for Sansovino in 2006–07 Coppa Italia, he was signed by Serie C1 club Pisa and spent 2 seasons with its Primavera team. After Pisa went bankrupt, he was signed by Serie B club Sassuolo and farmed to Lega Pro Prima Divisione club Sambenedettese in co-ownership deal. On 26 June 2009, Sambenedettese bought him outright after winning the closed tender regarding the remain 50% registration rights between the two clubs. However, in July 2009, Sassuolo re-signed Titone after Sambenedettese went bankrupt.

On 18 January 2011 Titone left for Lanciano in temporary deal with option to purchase. Titone missed the whole second half of 2011–12 Lega Pro Prima Divisione, except the promotion playoffs. After a short experience with FC Ceahlăul Piatra Neamț (Romanian Liga I) he signs for A.S. Bisceglie Calcio 1913 (Italian Serie D).

== Representative teams ==
Titone played once for the Italy U20 Lega Pro team against Hungary in 2008–09 Mirop Cup. He won the annual Lega Pro Prima Divisione Trophy with U21 representative team of Group A and won Trofeo Dossena with U20 Lega Pro representative team in June 2009.

During the 2009–10 season, he played once for Italy under-21 Serie B representative team in internal training match.
