= Marione =

Italian political cartoonist (born 1972)

Mario Improta (born 1972), known as Marione, is an Italian political cartoonist. He was a member of the Five Star Movement (M5S) and was briefly commissioned in 2019 by the mayor of Rome, Virginia Raggi, to make cartoons on civic values. In 2021, he ended his endorsement of M5S and Raggi, and joined Italexit.

== Biography ==
Marione was born in Reggio Calabria and raised in Rome. He graduated with a law degree but found work as a cartoonist, illustrator, and tattoo artist. He took part in M5S founder Beppe Grillo's V-Days in 2007. He was a candidate for the party in the 2018 Italian general election.

Marione has taken positions against jus soli, against the euro, and against George Soros. He criticised the second Conte government and the M5S for forming government with the Democratic Party (PD) in 2019, likening it to seeing his partner having sex with a friend who had stolen money from him. He has criticised and praised Lega and its leader Matteo Salvini, with which the M5S formed the first Conte government from 2018 to 2019; as someone born in Southern Italy, he brought up the party and leader's history of anti-southern bigotry. His attacks on Lega and Salvini grew during the last days of their government. Marione has been accused by various sources of operating the deleted Twitter account @mariusmida, which made sexist comments towards the PD politicians Laura Boldrini and Maria Elena Boschi; he previously denied that it was his account, and in 2018 said that screenshots of the tweets were not genuine.

In September 2019, Marione was hired by Virginia Raggi, the M5S mayor of Rome, to make comic books educating children on civic values. Jacopo Iacoboni of La Stampa questioned the appropriateness of Marione for the task due to his history of cartoons making obscene insults towards political opponents. The comics he made for Raggi portrayed her as a security guard and outlining the punishments for vandalism. In December 2019, Raggi ended the unpaid commission due to controversy over a Brexit-related cartoon in which Marione portrayed the European Union as a concentration camp. In September, Marione declared that he would no longer support Raggi, and endorsed Gilberto Trombetta for the 2021 Rome municipal election. Trombetta, who proposed reintroducing the ancient currency of the sestertius, was standing for Renconquer Italy, a platform including Italexit. He stood for Italexit in the 2022 Italian general election, in Lazio's fourth single-seat constituency, concurrent with Municipio VII of Rome. He received 7,305 votes (1.6%).
