= Matteo Merini =

Italian footballer (born 1988)

Personal information
- Date of birth: 21 January 1988 (age 38)
- Place of birth: Rome, Italy
- Height: 1.85 m (6 ft 1 in)
- Position: Striker

Youth career
- –2007: Bari

Senior career*
Years	Team	Apps	(Gls)
2007–2009	Lazio	0	(0)
2007–2008	→ Gallipoli (loan)	1	(0)
2008	→ Kmita Zabierzów (loan)	0	(0)
2008–2009	→ Melfi (loan)	23	(8)
2009–2011	Sangiovannese	22	(7)
2011–2015	Carrarese	101	(20)
2015–2016	Pistoiese	6	(0)
2016–2017	Santarcangelo	28	(5)
2017–2018	Gavorrano	12	(0)
- * Club domestic league appearances and goals

Matteo Merini (born 21 January 1988) is an Italian former professional footballer who played as a striker.

== Club career ==
Lazio loaned Merini to Polish club Kmita Zabierzów in early 2008. He was supposed to become one of the very few Italians players in the Polish club competitions, but he broke his jaw in two places in a friendly game and returned to Italy without making a league appearance for Kmita.

In July 2008, Merini went on trial with Scottish side Livingston but was not offered a permanent contract.
