= Luíz Sacilotto =

Brazilian footballer

Personal information
- Full name: Luís Gabriel Sacilotto Filho
- Date of birth: 18 March 1983 (age 43)
- Place of birth: Americana, São Paulo, Brazil
- Height: 1.84 m (6 ft 0 in)
- Position: Midfielder

Team information
- Current team: Lecce

Senior career*
Years	Team	Apps	(Gls)
2003–2005	Rio Branco (SP)	34	(9)
2003	→ St Patrick's Athletic (loan)	26	(6)
2005	→ Perugia (loan)	0	(0)
2005–2006	Valfabbrica	30	(5)
2006–2009	Cesena	13	(1)
2007	→ Lanciano (loan)	13	(1)
2009–2011	Lanciano	20	(1)
2011–2012	Nocerina	5	(1)
2012–2013	Latina	25	(1)
2013–2015	Lecce	33	(2)
2015–2016	Siena	13	(1)
2016	Tupi	10	(0)
- * Club domestic league appearances and goals

Luís Gabriel Sacilotto Filho (born 18 March 1983) is a Brazilian former footballer who played as a midfielder.

== Career ==
He was signed by St Patrick's Athletic on 28 May 2003 and joined on 3 February 2005 to A.C. Perugia on loan. Sacilotto then played a season in Eccellenza for Valfabbrica, before signed by Cesena (Serie B) on 9 June 2006. In January 2007, he was loaned to Lanciano (Serie C1).
