= List of Italian football transfers summer 2010 (co-ownership) =

This is a list of Italian football transfers for co-ownership resolutions, for the 2010–11 season, from and to Serie A and Serie B.

According to Article 102 bis of NOIF (Norme Organizzative Interne della F.I.G.C). The co-ownership deal must be confirmed each year. The deal may expired, renewed, bought back or sold outright. Deals that failed to form an agreement after the deadline, will be defined by auction between the 2 clubs. Which the club will submit their bid in a sealed envelope. Non-submission may lead to the rights is free to give to the opposite side. The mother club could sell their rights to third parties, likes Emiliano Viviano in the last year.

== Co-ownership ==
Date	Name	Nat	Co-Owner (active)	Passive club (Mother club)	Result	Fee
25 June 2010	Giovanni Abate	Italy	Mantova	Portogruaro	Renewed	
21 June 2010	Michael Agazzi	Italy	Cagliari	Triestina	Cagliari	Undisclosed
25 June 2010	Luis Maria Alfageme	Argentina	Grosseto	Brescia	Renewed	
24 June 2010	Enrico Alfonso	Italy	Internazionale	Chievo	Renewed	
	Domenico Aliperta	Italy	Noicattaro	Bari	ND	
25 June 2010	Cristian Altinier	Italy	Portogruaro	Mantova	Renewed	
26 June 2010	Emanuele Ameltonis	Italy	Cosenza	Siena	ND (Cosenza)	Auction
25 June 2010	Giuseppe Angarano	Italy	Piacenza	Internazionale	Renewed	
25 June 2010	Andrea Aperuta	Italy	Poggibonsi	Empoli	ND (Poggibonsi)	
25 June 2010	Matteo Arati	Italy	Fiorentina	Reggiana	Renewed	
25 June 2010	Pietro Arcidiacono	Italy	Sorrento	Empoli	ND (Sorrento)	
15 June 2010	Simone Aresti	Italy	Alghero	Cagliari	Cagliari	Undisclosed
25 June 2010	Rachid Arma	Morocco	Torino	SPAL	SPAL	Undisclosed
25 June 2010	Pietro Arnulfo	Italy	Figline	Sampdoria	ND (Figline)	
26 June 2010	Andrea Arrigoni	Italy	Lecco	Atalanta	Atalanta	Auction
25 June 2010	Ivan Artipoli	Italy	Lazio	Sampdoria	ND (Lazio)	
24 June 2010	Alberto Artuso	Italy	South Tyrol	Chievo	Chievo	Undisclosed
25 June 2010	Giuseppe Arvia	Italy	Pro Vasto	Empoli	ND (Pro Vasto)	
25 June 2010	Davide Astori	Italy	Cagliari	Milan	Renewed	
23 June 2010	Salvatore Aurelio	Italy	Frosinone	Genoa	Frosinone	€0.8M (Player exchange)
25 June 2010	Loris Bacchetti	Italy	Sampdoria	Pescara	Renewed	
25 June 2010	Pietro Baccolo	Italy	Parma	Padova	Renewed	
25 June 2010	Alain Baclet	France	Lecce	Arezzo	Lecce	Undisclosed
24 June 2010	Ivano Baldanzeddu	Italy	Lucchese	Empoli	Renewed	
25 June 2010	Pietro Balistreri	Italy	Ternana	Palermo	ND (Ternana)	
25 June 2010	Nicola Barbetti	Italy	Sambonifacese	Atalanta	ND (Sambonifacese)	
26 June 2010	Davide Bariti	Italy	Carrarese	Triestina	Triestina	Auction
25 June 2010	Ahmed Barusso	Ghana	Roma	Rimini	Roma	€100K
25 June 2010	Migjen Basha	Switzerland	Frosinone	Rimini	Frosinone	Undisclosed
25 June 2010	Nicola Belmonte	Italy	Siena	Bari	Renewed	
24 June 2010	Maikol Benassi	Italy	Viareggio	Empoli	Viareggio	Undisclosed
25 June 2010	Alex Benvenga	Italy	Varese	Lecce	ND (Varese)	
3 June 2010	Giacomo Beretta	Italy	Milan	AlbinoLeffe	Milan	€1M
23 June 2010	Dario Bergamelli	Italy	AlbinoLeffe	Atalanta	Renewed	
25 June 2010	Alessandro Bernardini	Italy	Livorno	Varese	Renewed	
	Matteo Bersellini	Italy	Barletta	Parma	ND	
16 June 2010	Jonathan Biabiany	France	Parma	Internazionale	Internazionale	€4.2M
25 June 2010	Davide Bianchi	Italy	Portogruaro	Padova	ND (Portogruaro)	
	Lorenzo Bianchini	Italy	Isola Liri	Roma	ND	
25 June 2010	Adrian Bica Badan	Romania	Cassino	Catania	Catania	Undisclosed
	Mirko Bigazzi	Italy	Carrarese	Livorno	ND	
25 June 2010	Antonio Bocchetti	Italy	Juve Stabia	Padova	ND (Juve Stabia)	
26 June 2010	Riccardo Bolzan	Italy	Taranto	Chievo	Taranto	Auction
	Mauro Bonaccorsi	Italy	FeralpiSalò	Brescia	ND	
25 June 2010	Matteo Bonatti	Italy	Lumezzane	Empoli	ND (Lumezzane)	
24 June 2010	Leonardo Bonucci	Italy	Bari	Genoa	Bari	€8M (three-way swap)
26 June 2010	Martino Borghese	Italy	Alghero	Genoa	Alghero	Auction
	Davide Borin	Italy	Pro Belvedere Vercelli	Juventus	ND	
25 June 2010	Milan Bortel	Slovakia	SPAL	Catania	Renewed	
	Mattia Bovi	Italy	Carpenedolo	Parma	ND	
25 June 2010	Michael Brini Ferri	Italy	Viareggio	Sassuolo	ND (Viareggio)	
25 June 2010	Rosario Bucolo	Italy	Celano	Catania	Catania	Undisclosed
25 June 2010	Alessandro Budel	Italy	Brescia	Parma	Renewed	
25 June 2010	Daniele Cacia	Italy	Lecce	Piacenza	Renewed	
25 June 2010	Nebil Caidi	Italy	Giacomense	Cesena	Cesena	Undisclosed
25 June 2010	Emanuele Calaiò	Italy	Siena	Napoli	Siena	Undisclosed
24 June 2010	Caetano	Brazil	Frosinone	Siena	Frosinone	Undisclosed
10 August 2010	Amedeo Calliari	Italy	Triestina	Chievo	Chievo	€0.22M (Player exchange)
25 June 2010	Luca Calzolaio	Italy	Spezia	Sampdoria	ND (Spezia)	
	Francesco Camilli	Italy	Carrarese	Juventus	ND	
25 June 2010	Matteo Camillini	Italy	Ternana	Ascoli	ND (Ternana)	
26 June 2010	Luisito Campisi	Italy	Verona	Atalanta	Verona	Auction, Undisclosed
25 June 2010	Manuel Canini	Italy	Internazionale	Cesena	Renewed	
25 June 2010	Andrea Caponi	Italy	Valenzana	Empoli	ND (Valenzana)	
23 June 2010	Denny Cardin	Italy	Portogruaro	Atalanta	Renewed	
	Maico Caroti	Italy	Poggibonsi	Empoli	ND	
25 June 2010	Paolo Castellazzi	Italy	Foligno	Sampdoria	Renewed	
25 June 2010	Ivan Castiglia	Italy	Cittadella	Reggina	Reggina	Undisclosed
25 June 2010	Fabio Ceccarelli	Italy	Cosenza	Chievo	ND (Cosenza)	
15 July 2010	Francesco Checcucci	Italy	Lumezzane	Chievo	Renewed	
23 June 2010	Michael Cia	Italy	AlbinoLeffe	Atalanta	Renewed	
25 June 2010	Simone Ciancio	Italy	Alessandria	Sampdoria	ND (Alessandria)	
25 June 2010	Federico Ciasca	Italy	Lecco	Brescia	ND (Lecco)	
30 June 2010	Daniel Ciofani	Italy	Cisco Roma	Pescara	Cisco Roma	Auction
	Andrea Ciolli	Italy	Pro Vercelli	Juventus	ND	
23 June 2010	Karamoko Cissé	Guinea	AlbinoLeffe	Atalanta	Renewed	
15 June 2010	Andrea Cocco	Italy	Alghero	Cagliari	Cagliari	€250
25 June 2010	Raffaele Conforto	Italy	Sassuolo	Internazionale	Renewed	
25 June 2010	Federico Conti	Italy	Cassino	Catania	Catania	Undisclosed
24 June 2010	Ferdinando Coppola	Italy	Atalanta	Milan	Milan	€0.2M
25 June 2010	Nicolás Córdova	Chile	Brescia	Parma	Renewed	
26 June 2010	Roberto Cortese	Italy	Taranto	Chievo	Taranto	Auction
25 June 2010	Nicola Cosentini	Italy	Figline	Juventus	Juventus	Undisclosed
26 June 2010	Francesco Cosenza	Italy	Ancona	Reggina	Reggina	Undisclosed
10 August 2010	Marcello Cottafava	Italy	Chievo	Triestina	Triestina	€0.21M (Player exchange)
	Giuseppe Cozzolino	Italy	Como	Lecce	ND (Como)	
25 June 2010	Domenico Criscito	Italy	Genoa	Juventus	Genoa	€6M
25 June 2010	Alessio Cristiani	Italy	Sassuolo	Viareggio	Viareggio	Undisclosed
25 June 2010	Matías Claudio Cuffa	Argentina	Padova	Portogruaro	Padova	Undisclosed
25 June 2010	André Cuneaz	Italy	Mantova	Juventus	Juventus	Undisclosed
24 June 2010	Gianluca Curci	Italy	Siena	Roma	Renewed	
25 June 2010	Fabio Cusaro	Italy	Cesena	Novara	ND (Cesena)	
	Patrick D'Aguanno	Italy	Potenza	Chievo	ND	
24 June 2010	Danilo D'Ambrosio	Italy	Torino	Juve Stabia	Torino	Undisclosed
25 June 2010	Francesco Andrea D'Amico	Italy	Colligiana	Catania	Catania	Undisclosed
25 June 2010	Alessandro D'Antoni	Italy	Figline	Juventus	Juventus	Undisclosed
25 June 2010	Gianmarco D'Oria	Italy	Prato	Empoli	Renewed	
25 June 2010	Marco Dalla Costa	Italy	Olbia	Internazionale	ND (Olbia)	
19 June 2010	Domenico Danti	Italy	Siena	Cosenza	Siena	Undisclosed
	Tommaso Davini	Italy	Grosseto	Viareggio	ND	
25 June 2010	Federico Del Grosso	Italy	Internazionale	Ternana	ND (Internazionale)	
25 June 2010	Stefano Del Sante	Italy	Varese	Fiorentina	Renewed	
25 June 2010	Mirko Delia	Italy	Potenza	Catania	ND (Potenza)	
25 June 2010	Daniele Dessena	Italy	Sampdoria	Parma	Sampdoria	Undisclosed
	Fabio Di Benedetto	Italy	San Marino	Bologna	ND (San Marino)	
	Stefano Di Berardino	Italy	Valle del Giovenco	Juventus	ND	
25 June 2010	Domenico Di Cecco	Italy	Lanciano	Chievo	Lanciano	Undisclosed
26 June 2010	Marco Di Fatta	Italy	Taranto	Catania	Catania	Undisclosed, Auction
25 June 2010	Luca Di Matteo	Italy	Vicenza	Palermo	Renewed	
25 June 2010	Giuseppe Di Pasquale	Italy	Manfredonia	Cataina	Undisclosed	
25 June 2010	Antonio Di Silvestro	Italy	Siracusa	Lecce	ND (Siracusa)	
25 June 2010	Mahamet Diagouraga	Mali	Modena	Chievo	Renewed	
26 June 2010	Morris Donati	Italy	Sampdoria	Brescia	ND (Sampdoria)	Auction
25 June 2010	Nicola Donazzan	Italy	Sassuolo	Mantova	Sassuolo	Undisclosed
26 June 2010	Samuele Dragoni	Italy	Piacenza	Brescia	ND (Piacenza)	
25 June 2010	Marco Duravia	Italy	Figline	Juventus	Juventus	Undisclosed
10 June 2010	Alessandro Elia	Italy	Bologna	Parma	Renewed	
25 June 2010	Solomon Enow	Cameroon	Spezia	Sampdoria	ND (Spezia)	
26 June 2010	Mirko Eramo	Italy	Sampdoria	Bari	Sampdoria	Auction
23 June 2010	Federico Erba	Italy	Cesena	Roma	Roma	Undisclosed
25 June 2010	Andrea Esposito	Italy	Genoa	Lecce	Renewed	
26 June 2010	Gennaro Esposito	Italy	Verona	Siena	Verona	Auction
25 June 2010	Giuliano Falco	Italy	Isola Liri	Roma	ND (Isola Liri)	
25 June 2010	Vito Falconieri	Italy	Ascoli	Catania	Renewed	
24 June 2010	Ivan Fatić	Montenegro	Genoa	Chievo	Renewed	
26 June 2010	Simone Fautario	Italy	Grosseto	Internazionale	Internazionale	Auction
25 June 2010	Daniele Federici	Italy	Grosseto	Internazionale	ND (Grosseto)	
25 June 2010	Nicola Ferrari	Italy	Viareggio	Sassuolo	Sassuolo	Undisclosed
25 June 2010	Mattia Ferrato	Italy	Carpenedolo	Parma	ND (Carpenedolo)	
25 June 2010	Andrea Ferretti	Italy	Pavia	Cesena	Renewed	
26 June 2010	Alberto Filippini	Italy	Padova	Atalanta	ND (Padova)	
25 June 2010	Luca Fiuzzi	Italy	Monza	Empoli	Renewed	
26 June 2010	Fabio Foglia	Italy	Piacenza	Pescara	ND	Auction
24 June 2010	Valerio Foglio	Italy	AlbinoLeffe	Vicenza	AlbinoLeffe	Undisclosed
25 June 2010	Fernando Forestieri	Italy	Udinese	Genoa	Renewed	
25 June 2010	Filippo Forò	Italy	Vicenza	Sambenedettese	ND (Vicenza)	
25 June 2010	Andrey Galabinov	Bulgaria	Lumezzane	Ascoli	Lumezzane	Undisclosed
25 June 2010	Nicolò Galli	Italy	Pergocrema	Parma	Renewed	
25 June 2010	Daniele Galloppa	Italy	Parma	Siena	Renewed	
25 June 2010	Andrea Gasparri	Italy	Parma	Siena	Parma	Undisclosed
25 June 2010	Marcello Gazzola	Italy	Ascoli	Catania	Renewed	
25 June 2010	Carmine Giorgione	Italy	Varese	Padova	ND (Varese)	
25 June 2010	Shadi Ghosheh	Italy	Bassano	Chievo	Renewed	
25 June 2010	Nicolas Giani	Italy	Vicenza	Internazionale	Renewed	
23 June 2010	Michael Girasole	Italy	AlbinoLeffe	Atalanta	Renewed	
25 June 2010	Nicolás Gorobsov	Italy	Torino	Vicenza	Renewed	
24 June 2010	Pablo Granoche	Uruguay	Chievo	Triestina	Chievo	Undisclosed
24 June 2010	Paolo Grossi	Italy	AlbinoLeffe	Varese	Renewed	
24 June 2010	Jan Hable	Czech Republic	Ascoli	Fiorentina	Renewed	
25 June 2010	Edmund Hottor	Ghana	Triestina	Milan	Renewed	
25 June 2010	Raffaele Ioime	Italy	SPAL	Catania	Renewed	
17 June 2010	Manuel Iori	Italy	Chievo	Cittadella	Chievo	Undisclosed
25 June 2010	Boško Janković	Serbia	Palermo	Genoa	Renewed	
26 June 2010	William Jidayi	Italy	Padova	Sassuolo	ND (Padova)	
26 June 2010	Luis Jiménez	Chile	Internazionale	Ternana	Ternana	Auction, €3.177M
26 June 2010	Nikolas Kras	Italy	Lucchese	Reggina	Reggina	Auction
26 June 2010	Antonio Langella	Italy	Bari	Udinese		Auction
25 June 2010	Davide Lanzafame	Italy	Palermo	Juventus	Renewed	
2 August 2010	Fabrizio Lasagna	Italy	Paganese	Catania	Catania	Undisclosed
3 June 2010	Andrea Lazzari	Italy	Cagliari	Atalanta	Cagliari	Undisclosed
25 June 2010	Fabio Lebran	Italy	Rimini	Parma	Parma	€75,000
17 June 2010	Elia Legati	Italy	Crotone	Milan	Milan	€0.35M
24 June 2010	Gianmarco Lenzi	Italy	Ascoli	Lucchese	Renewed	
25 June 2010	Pietro Lorenzini	Italy	Carpenedolo	Parma	ND (Carpenedolo)	
24 June 2010	Arturo Lupoli	Italy	Ascoli	Fiorentina	Renewed	
25 June 2010	Davide Luppi	Italy	Manfredonia	Sassuolo	Sassuolo	Undisclosed
25 June 2010	Francesco Lunardini	Italy	Parma	Rimini	Parma	€100,000
24 June 2010	Nicola Madonna	Italy	Atalanta	AlbinoLeffe	Renewed	
25 June 2010	Simone Malatesta	Italy	Mantova	Parma	Parma	peppercorn
24 June 2010	Niccolò Manfredini	Italy	Reggiana	Fiorentina	Renewed	
25 June 2010	Daniele Mannini	Italy	Sampdoria	Napoli	Renewed	
25 June 2010	Alessio Manzoni	Italy	Parma	Atalanta	Renewed	
16 June 2010	McDonald Mariga	Kenya	Internazionale	Parma	Internazionale	€4.2M
25 June 2010	Daniele Marino	Italy	Melfi	Internazionale	ND (Melfi)	
25 June 2010	Mirko Martucci	Italy	SPAL	Genoa	ND (SPAL)	
25 June 2010	Alessandro Marotta	Italy	Gubbio	Bari	Bari	€60,000
25 June 2010	Salvatore Masiello	Italy	Bari	Udinese	Renewed	
25 June 2010	Leonardo Massoni	Italy	Verona	Sassuolo	Renewed	
25 June 2010	Davide Matteini	Italy	Rimini	Palermo	ND	
25 June 2010	Jean Mbida	Cameroon	Internazionale	Vicenza	Vicenza	€500
26 June 2010	Riccardo Meggiorini	Italy	Bari	Genoa	Genoa	Auction, €1.79M
25 June 2010	Matteo Merini	Italy	Sangiovannese	Chievo	Renewed	
26 June 2010	Adriano Mezavilla	Brazil	Taranto	Catania	Taranto	Auction
26 June 2010	Vittorio Micolucci	Italy	Ascoli	Udinese		Auction
25 June 2010	Gianvito Misuraca	Italy	Vicenza	Palermo	Renewed	
26 June 2010	Leonardo Moracci	Italy	Alessandria	Chievo	Chievo	Auction, €500
25 June 2010	Lorenzo Morelli	Italy	Reggiana	Fiorentina	Fiorentina	€150,000
25 June 2010	Davide Moscardelli	Italy	Piacenza	Rimini	ND (Piacenza)	
26 June 2010	Marco Motta	Italy	Roma	Udinese	Udinese	Auction, €1.45M
25 June 2010	Gianni Munari	Italy	Lecce	Palermo	Renewed	
3 June 2010	Daniel Offredi	Italy	AlbinoLeffe	Milan	AlbinoLeffe	€50,000
26 June 2010	Biagio Pagano	Italy	Reggina	Rimini	Rimini	Auction, Undisclosed
25 June 2010	Raffaele Palladino	Italy	Genoa	Juventus	Renewed	
16 June 2010	Alberto Paloschi	Italy	Parma	Milan	Renewed	
25 June 2010	Francesco Pambianchi	Italy	Pergocrema	Parma	Renewed	
25 June 2010	Aniello Panariello	Italy	Pergocrema	Empoli	ND (Pergocrema)	
25 June 2010	Marco Paoloni	Italy	Cremonese	Udinese	Cremonese	Undisclosed
25 June 2010	Michele Paolucci	Italy	Siena	Juventus	Renewed	
10 June 2010	Riccardo Pasi	Italy	Parma	Bologna	Renewed	
26 June 2010	Lorenzo Pasqualini	Italy	Brindisi	Ascoli	Ascoli	Auction, Undisclosed
24 June 2010	Edoardo Pazzagli	Italy	Prato	Fiorentina	Renewed	
24 June 2010	Mirko Pennesi	Italy	Lucchese	Ascoli	Renewed	
25 June 2010	Nicolò Perna	Italy	Vibonese	Catania	ND (Vibonese)	
25 June 2010	Matteo Piccinni	Italy	AlbinoLeffe	Udinese	AlbinoLeffe	Undisclosed
25 June 2010	Stefano Pietribiasi	Italy	Sambonifacese	Vicenza	Sambonifacese	Undisclosed
25 June 2010	Mattia Piras	Italy	Genoa	Pergocrema	Renewed	
25 June 2010	Daniele Piro	Italy	Pro Vasto	Chievo	ND (Pro Vasto)	Free
31 August 2010	Fabio Pisacane	Italy	Lumezzane	Chievo	Renewed	
15 June 2010	Andrea Pisanu	Italy	Bologna	Parma	Renewed	
25 June 2010	Giuseppe Polito	Italy	South Tyrol	Palermo	Palermo	Undisclosed
25 June 2010	Dario Polverini	Italy	Pro Patria	Roma	ND (Pro Patria)	Free
26 June 2010	Alessandro Potenza	Italy	Catania	Genoa	Catania	Undisclosed, Auction
	Andrea Pozzato	Italy	Canavese	Juventus	ND	
25 June 2010	Matteo Prandelli	Italy	Como	Siena	ND (Como)	
25 June 2010	Stefano Procida	Italy	Ternana	Torino	ND (Ternana)	
26 June 2010	Antonino Profeta	Italy	Potenza	Catania	Catania	Undisclosed, Auction
25 June 2010	Reginaldo	Brazil	Siena	Parma	Renewed	
25 June 2010	Francesco Renzetti	Italy	Padova	Genoa	Padova	€1M
26 June 2010	Giovanni Ricciardo	Italy	Villacidrese	Catania	Catania	Undisclosed, Auction
25 June 2010	Marco Romizi	Italy	Reggiana	Fiorentina	Fiorentina	Undisclosed
23 June 2010	Stefano Pondaco	Italy	Portogruaro	Sampdoria	Portogruaro	Free
24 June 2010	Michele Rigione	Italy	Internazionale	Chievo	Renewed	
25 June 2010	Nicola Rigoni	Italy	Palermo	Vicenza	Renewed	
25 June 2010	Andrea Rispoli	Italy	Parma	Brescia	Renewed	
25 June 2010	Aleandro Rosi	Italy	Siena	Roma	Renewed	
23 June 2010	Jonathan Rossini	Switzerland	Udinese	Sampdoria	Renewed	
25 June 2010	Danilo Russo	Italy	Vicenza	Genoa	Renewed	
25 June 2010	Mario Salgado	Chile	Torino	Foggia	Torino	Undisclosed
25 June 2010	Gleison Santos	Brazil	Reggina	Genoa	ND (Reggina)	
15 June 2010	Marco Sau	Italy	Lecco	Cagliari	Cagliari	Undisclosed
17 June 2010	Stefano Scappini	Italy	Ravenna	Sampdoria	Renewed	
24 June 2010	Ezequiel Schelotto	Italy	Atalanta	Cesena	Atalanta	Undisclosed
23 June 2010	Matteo Scozzarella	Italy	Portogruaro	Atalanta	Renewed	
25 June 2010	Daniele Simoncelli	Barletta	Brescia	ND (Barletta)	Free	
25 June 2010	Danilo Soddimo	Italy	Pescara	Sampdoria	Pescara	€0.3M (part of Testardi)
24 June 2010	Matteo Solini	Italy	Internazionale	Chievo	Renewed	
25 June 2010	Thomas Som	Cameroon	Pro Patria	Parma	ND (Pro Patria)	
25 June 2010	Giovanni Taormina	Italy	Viareggio	Sampdoria	ND (Viareggio)	
23 June 2010	Diogo Tavares	Portugal	Frosinone	Genoa	Frosinone	€0.6M (Player exchange)
25 June 2010	Andrea Tecchio	Italy	Sambonifacese	Vicenza	Renewed	
26 June 2010	Luca Tedeschi	Italy	Ternana	Parma	Parma	Auction, €121,000
23 June 2010	Fernando Tissone	Argentina	Sampdoria	Udinese	Renewed	
25 June 2010	Pietro Tripoli	Italy	Varese	Palermo	ND (Varese)	
26 June 2010	Alessio Tombesi	Italy	Novara	Parma	Parma	Auction
26 June 2010	Paolo Tornaghi	Italy	Rimini	Internazionale	Internazionale	Auction
28 June 2010	Andrea Torta	Italy	Foggia	Juventus	Foggia	Auction
26 June 2010	Giuseppe Toscano	Italy	Lucchese	Reggina	Reggina	Auction
25 June 2010	Matteo Trini	Italy	Lumezzane	Juventus	Renewed	
26 June 2010	Alessandro Tulli	Italy	Piacenza	Lecce	Piacenza	
26 June 2010	Ronny Valerio	Italy	Carpenedolo	Parma	Parma	Auction
15 June 2010	Francesco Valiani	Italy	Parma	Bologna	Renewed	
25 June 2010	Marco Valtulina	Italy	SPAL	Torino	Torino	Undisclosed
25 June 2010	Daniele Vantaggiato	Italy	Padova	Parma	Renewed	
25 June 2010	Francesco Mirko Velardi	Italy	Foggia	Palermo	Palermo	Undisclosed
10 June 2010	Emiliano Viviano	Italy	Internazionale	Bologna	Renewed	
25 June 2010	Francesco Volpe	Italy	Livorno	Juventus	Renewed	
25 June 2010	Massimo Volta	Italy	Sampdoria	Parma	Renewed	
25 June 2010	Papa Waigo	Senegal	Fiorentina	Genoa	ND (Fiorentina)	Auction
25 June 2010	Marcelo Zalayeta	Uruguay	Napoli	Juventus	ND (Napoli)	
25 June 2010	Francesco Zanardini	Italy	Lumezzane	Brescia	ND (Lumezzane)	

== See also ==
- List of Italian football transfers summer 2010
