= 2009–10 Coppa Italia =

Tournament details
- Country: Italy
- Dates: 2 August 2009 – 5 May 2010
- Teams: 78

Final positions
- Champions: Inter Milan (6th title)
- Runners-up: Roma

Tournament statistics
- Matches played: 79
- Goals scored: 209 (2.65 per match)
- Top goal scorer(s): Alain Baclet; Adrian Mutu (4 goals)

The 2009–10 Coppa Italia, also known as TIM Cup for sponsorship reasons, was the 63rd edition of the domestic tournament. The competition started on 2 August 2009 and ended on 5 May 2010. As in the previous year, 78 clubs took part in the tournament. Inter Milan were the cup holders.

== Participating teams ==
=== Lega Calcio ===
==== Serie A (20 teams) ====
- Atalanta
- Bari
- Bologna
- Cagliari
- Catania
- Chievo
- Fiorentina
- Genoa
- Inter Milan
- Juventus
- Lazio
- Livorno
- Milan
- Napoli
- Palermo
- Parma
- Roma
- Sampdoria
- Siena
- Udinese

==== Serie B (22 teams) ====
- AlbinoLeffe
- Ancona
- Ascoli
- Brescia
- Cesena
- Cittadella
- Crotone
- Empoli
- Frosinone
- Gallipoli
- Grosseto
- Lecce
- Mantova
- Modena
- Padova
- Piacenza
- Reggina
- Salernitana
- Sassuolo
- Torino
- Triestina
- Vicenza

=== Lega Pro ===
==== Prima Divisione (25 teams) ====
- Alessandria
- Arezzo
- Benevento
- Cavese
- Como
- Cosenza
- Cremonese
- Figline
- Foggia
- Giulianova
- Lumezzane
- Novara
- Pergocrema
- Perugia
- Pescina V.d.G.
- Pro Patria
- Ravenna
- Marcianise
- Reggiana
- Rimini
- SPAL
- Taranto
- Ternana
- Varese
- Hellas Verona

==== Seconda Divisione (6 teams) ====
- Fano
- Gela
- Nocerina
- Prato
- Spezia
- Vico Equense

=== Lega Nazionale Dilettanti ===
==== Serie D (5 teams) ====
- Renate
- Chioggia Sottomarina
- Castellarano
- Sansepolcro
- Viterbese

== Seedings and format ==
Teams entered the cup at various stages, as follows:

- First phase: one-leg fixtures
  - First round: 36 Teams from Lega Pro and lower, comprising 25 teams from Lega Pro Prima Divisione (1 team relegated from Serie B 2008-09, 7 promoted teams, and the 17 best Prima Divisione teams not promoted 2008-09), 6 teams from Lega Pro Seconda Divisione (4 promoted from Serie D 2008-09, 2 high finishers in Seconda 2008-09) and 5 teams from Serie D (generally high finishers but not promoted 2008-09);
  - Second round: The 18 winners face 22 Serie B teams.
  - Third round: The 20 survivors meet Serie A sides seeded 9-20
  - Fourth round: The 16 survivors face off.
- Second phase: one-leg fixtures (except semifinal)
  - Round of 16: 8 Fourth round winners are inserted into a bracket with seeds 1-8
    - Seeds 1-8: Fiorentina, Genoa, Milan, Inter, Juventus, Udinese, Roma, Lazio (cup holders)
  - Quarterfinals: 8 last 16 winners.
  - Semifinals: Two-leg fixtures with pairings based upon bracket
- Final: one-leg fixture at the Stadio Olimpico in Rome.

== Matches ==
=== Elimination rounds ===
Key
| Serie A |
| Serie B |
| Lega Pro Prima Divisione |
| Lega Pro Seconda Divisione |
| Serie D |

==== Section 1 ====
First Round
Pro Patria | 4
Gela | 0
Cavese | 2 (3)
Varese (pso) | 2 (5)

Second Round
Mantova | 3
Pro Patria | 1
Frosinone (pso) | 1 (4)
Varese | 1 (3)

Third Round
Chievo | 3
Mantova | 0
Bologna | 0 (6)
Frosinone (pso) | 0 (7)

Fourth Round
Chievo | 2
Frosinone | 0

===== Match details =====
====== First round ======
2 August 2009
18:00

| Pro Patria | 4 – 0 | Gela |
|---|---|---|
| Sarno 17'; Pacilli 52'; Ripa 63', 81' (pen.) | Report |

Stadio Carlo Speroni, Busto Arsizio
Attendance: 1,113
Referee: Mauro Vivenzi (Italy)

2 August 2009
20:30

| Cavese | 2 – 2 (a.e.t.) | Varese |
|---|---|---|
| Favasuli 43'; Schetter 44' | Report | 56', 87' Momentè |
Penalties
| Favasuli (penalty scored); Farina (penalty scored); Tarantino (penalty scored); Cipriani (penalty missed) | 3 – 5 | (penalty scored) Grossi; (penalty scored) Buzzegoli; (penalty scored) Radi; (penalty scored) Ebagua; (penalty scored) Momentè |

Stadio Simonetta Lamberti, Cava de' Tirreni
Attendance: 2,208
Referee: Gaetano Zonno (Italy)

====== Second round ======
9 August 2009
20:45

| Mantova | 3 – 1 | Pro Patria |
|---|---|---|
| Marchesetti 4'; Caridi 53'; Tarana 64' | Report | 47' Ripa |

Stadio Danilo Martelli, Mantua
Attendance: 1,500
Referee: Gianpaolo Calvarese (Italy)

9 August 2009
20:45

| Frosinone | 1 – 1 (a.e.t.) | Varese |
|---|---|---|
| Basha 90+2' | Report | 63' Buzzegoli |
Penalties
| Bocchetti (penalty missed); Basso (penalty scored); Tavares (penalty scored); Biso (penalty missed); Guidi (penalty scored); Ascoli (penalty scored) | 4 – 3 | (penalty scored) Grossi; (penalty missed) Gambadori; (penalty scored) Ebagua; (penalty missed) Radi; (penalty scored) Corti; (penalty missed) Tripoli |

Stadio Matusa, Frosinone
Attendance: 3,000
Referee: Marco Guida (Italy)

====== Third round ======
15 August 2009
20:45

| Chievo | 3 – 0 | Mantova |
|---|---|---|
| Bogdani 48'; Pellissier 82'; Bentivoglio 90+1' | Report |

Stadio Marc'Antonio Bentegodi, Verona
Attendance: 3,223
Referee: Andrea De Marco (Italy)

15 August 2009
20:45

| Bologna | 0 – 0 (a.e.t.) | Frosinone |
|---|---|---|
| | Report |
Penalties
| Adaílton (penalty scored); Britos (penalty missed); Raggi (penalty scored); Valiani (penalty scored); Mingazzini (penalty scored); Osvaldo (penalty scored); Vigiani (penalty scored); Zenoni (penalty missed) | 6 – 7 | (penalty missed) Scarlato; (penalty scored) Guidi; (penalty scored) Basso; (penalty scored) Aurelio; (penalty scored) Santoruvo; (penalty scored) Mazzeo; (penalty scored) Biso; (penalty scored) Basha |

Stadio Bruno Benelli, Ravenna
Attendance: 2,000
Referee: Andrea Romeo (Italy)

====== Fourth round ======
25 November 2009
15:00

| Chievo | 2 – 0 | Frosinone |
|---|---|---|
| Hanine 39'; Bentivoglio 90+4' | Report |

Stadio Marc'Antonio Bentegodi, Verona
Attendance: 654
Referee: Dino Tommasi (Italy)

==== Section 2 ====
First Round
SPAL | 2
Como | 1
Ravenna | 3
Giulianova | 2
Arezzo | 2
Castellarano | 0

Second Round
AlbinoLeffe | 1
SPAL (aet) | 3
Brescia | 1
Ravenna | 0
Reggina | 3
Arezzo | 0

Third Round
Palermo | 4
SPAL | 2
Brescia | 0
Reggina | 1

Fourth Round
Palermo | 4
Reggina | 1

===== Match details =====
====== First round ======
2 August 2009
20:30

| SPAL | 2 – 1 | Como |
|---|---|---|
| Arma 22' (pen.); Meloni 40' | Report | 70' (pen.) Riva |

Stadio Paolo Mazza, Ferrara
Attendance: 1,990
Referee: Nicola Stefanini (Italy)

2 August 2009
20:45

| Ravenna | 3 – 2 | Giulianova |
|---|---|---|
| Scappini 57'; Cavagna 70'; Piovaccari 90+3' (pen.) | Report | 44' (pen.) Campagnacci; 54' Carbonaro |

Stadio Bruno Benelli, Ravenna
Attendance: 879
Referee: Giorgio Peretti (Italy)

2 August 2009
21:00

| Arezzo | 2 – 0 | Castellarano |
|---|---|---|
| Erpen 8'; Chianese 76' (pen.) | Report |

Stadio Città di Arezzo, Arezzo
Attendance: 1,183
Referee: Maurizio Mariani (Italy)

====== Second round ======
9 August 2009
20:30

| SPAL | 3 – 1 (a.e.t.) | AlbinoLeffe |
|---|---|---|
| Bracaletti 40'; Quintavalla 107'; Arma 116' | Report | 24' Previtali |

Stadio Paolo Mazza, Ferrara
Attendance: 1,990
Referee: Nicola Stefanini (Italy)

9 August 2009
20:30

| Brescia | 1 – 0 | Ravenna |
|---|---|---|
| Salamon 72' | Report |

Stadio Mario Rigamonti, Brescia
Attendance: 1,893
Referee: Andrea Romeo (Italy)

9 August 2009
20:30

| Reggina | 3 – 0 | Arezzo |
|---|---|---|
| Volpi 19' (pen.); Brienza 56'; Missiroli 90' | Report |

Stadio Oreste Granillo, Reggio Calabria
Attendance: 4,602
Referee: Carmine Russo (Italy)

====== Third round ======
15 August 2009
20:30

| Palermo | 4 – 2 | SPAL |
|---|---|---|
| Miccoli 32' (pen.), 37'; Simplício 52'; Cavani 71' | Report | 21', 80' Arma |

Stadio Renzo Barbera, Palermo
Attendance: 9,208
Referee: Maurizio Ciampi (Italy)

15 August 2009
20:30

| Brescia | 0 – 1 | Reggina |
|---|---|---|
| | Report | 26' Brienza |

Stadio Mario Rigamonti, Brescia
Attendance: 1,500
Referee: Nicola Pierpaoli (Italy)

====== Fourth round ======
26 November 2009
20:30

| Palermo | 4 – 1 | Reggina |
|---|---|---|
| Miccoli 33' (pen.); Cavani 57'; Budan 69', 74' | Report | 48' Volpi |

Stadio Renzo Barbera, Palermo
Attendance: 9,358
Referee: Mauro Bergonzi (Italy)

==== Section 3 ====
First Round
Rimini | 1
Vico Equense (aet) | 2
Pergocrema | 0
Figline | 1

Second Round
Lecce | 4
Vico Equense | 0
Torino | 1
Figline | 0

Third Round
Sampdoria | 6
Lecce | 2
Livorno | 2
Torino | 0

Fourth Round
Sampdoria | 1
Livorno | 2

===== Match details =====
====== First round ======
2 August 2009
20:45

| Rimini | 1 – 2 (a.e.t.) | Vico Equense |
|---|---|---|
| Frara 23' (pen.) | Report | 60' Trapani; 108' Burgos |

Stadio Romeo Neri, Rimini
Attendance: 1,119
Referee: Andrea Coccia (Italy)

2 August 2009
17:00

| Pergocrema | 0 – 1 | Figline |
|---|---|---|
| | Report | 34' Fanucchi |

Stadio Giuseppe Voltini, Crema
Attendance: 736
Referee: Denis Santonocito (Italy)

====== Second round ======
9 August 2009
20:30

| Lecce | 4 – 0 | Vico Equense |
|---|---|---|
| Baclet 3', 13', 43', 61' | Report |

Stadio Pier Cesare Tombolato, Cittadella
Attendance: 2,487
Referee: Riccardo Tozzi (Italy)

9 August 2009
20:30

| Torino | 1 – 0 | Figline |
|---|---|---|
| Bianchi 68' | Report |

Stadio Gino Pistoni, Ivrea
Attendance: 4,500
Referee: Mauro Bergonzi (Italy)

====== Third round ======
16 August 2009
20:30

| Sampdoria | 6 – 2 | Lecce |
|---|---|---|
| Pazzini 8', 33'; Cassano 32', 59'; Palombo 76' (pen.); Padalino 90' | Report | 73' Defendi; 81' (o.g.) Lucchini |

Stadio Luigi Ferraris, Genoa
Attendance: 10,240
Referee: Roberto Rosetti (Italy)

14 August 2009
20:30

| Livorno | 2 – 0 | Torino |
|---|---|---|
| Raimondi 72'; Dionisi 80' | Report |

Stadio Armando Picchi, Livorno
Attendance: 3,821
Referee: Daniele Orsato (Italy)

====== Fourth round ======
1 December 2009
20:30

| Sampdoria | 1 – 2 | Livorno |
|---|---|---|
| Mannini 46' | Report | 76' (o.g.) Lucchini; 86' Danilevičius |

Stadio Luigi Ferraris, Genoa
Attendance: 4,212
Referee: Nicola Stefanini (Italy)

==== Section 4 ====
First Round
Benevento | 3
Prato | 1

Second Round
Salernitana | 1
Benevento | 0
Cittadella | 2
Padova | 0
Ascoli | 3
Crotone | 1

Third Round
Napoli | 3
Salernitana | 0
Cittadella (aet) | 2
Ascoli | 1

Fourth Round
Napoli | 1
Cittadella | 0

===== Match details =====
====== First round ======
2 August 2009
20:45

| Benevento | 3 – 1 | Prato |
|---|---|---|
| Clemente 24'; Evacuo 48'; Carcione 90+2' | Report | 72' Vieri |

Stadio Santa Colomba, Benevento
Attendance: 7,750
Referee: Massimiliano De Benedictis (Italy)

====== Second round ======
8 August 2009
20:30

| Salernitana | 1 – 0 | Benevento |
|---|---|---|
| Caputo 56' (pen.) | Report |

Stadio Arechi, Salerno
Attendance: 7,000
Referee: Antonio Giannoccaro (Italy)

9 August 2009
20:45

| Cittadella | 2 – 0 | Padova |
|---|---|---|
| Cherubin 59'; Ardemagni 79' | Report |

Stadio Pier Cesare Tombolato, Cittadella
Attendance: 3,000
Referee: Nicola Pierpaoli (Italy)

9 August 2009
20:45

| Ascoli | 3 – 1 | Crotone |
|---|---|---|
| Romeo 36', 50'; Pesce 90' | Report | 45+3' (o.g.) Frezzolini |

Stadio Cino e Lillo Del Duca, Ascoli Piceno
Attendance: 3,022
Referee: Paolo Tagliavento (Italy)

====== Third round ======
16 August 2009
20:30

| Napoli | 3 – 0 | Salernitana |
|---|---|---|
| Maggio 29'; Lavezzi 43'; Hoffer 84' | Report |

Stadio San Paolo, Naples
Attendance: 30,000
Referee: Andrea Gervasoni (Italy)

15 August 2009
19:00

| Cittadella | 2 – 1 (a.e.t.) | Ascoli |
|---|---|---|
| Pettinari 84'; Ardemagni 117' | Report | Pesce 48' |

Stadio Pier Cesare Tombolato, Cittadella
Attendance: 1,183
Referee: Daniele Doveri (Italy)

====== Fourth round ======
26 November 2009
20:30

| Napoli | 1 –0 | Cittadella |
|---|---|---|
| Bogliacino 27' | Report |

Stadio San Paolo, Naples
Attendance: 30,000
Referee: Domenico Celi (Italy)

==== Section 5 ====
First Round
Taranto | 1
Cosenza | 3
Novara | 1
Pescina V.d.G. | 0

Second Round
Grosseto | 3
Cosenza | 2
Modena | 2 (4)
Novara (pso) | 2 (6)

Third Round
Siena | 2
Grosseto | 0
Parma | 1
Novara | 2

Fourth Round
Siena | 0
Novara | 2

===== Match details =====
====== First round ======
2 August 2009
20:30

| Taranto | 1 – 3 | Cosenza |
|---|---|---|
| Innocenti 21' | Report | 34' Porchia; 68' Caccavallo; 83' Danti |

Stadio Erasmo Iacovone, Taranto
Attendance: 6,710
Referee: Ciro Carbone (Italy)

2 August 2009
18:00

| Novara | 1 – 0 | Pescina V.d.G. |
|---|---|---|
| Bertani 67' | Report |

Stadio Silvio Piola, Novara
Attendance: 1,406
Referee: Davide Penno (Italy)

====== Second round ======
10 August 2009
20:30

| Grosseto | 3 – 2 | Cosenza |
|---|---|---|
| Pichlmann 22'; Federici 37'; Alfageme 84' | Report | 48' Mortelliti; 67' Ceccarelli |

Stadio Olimpico Carlo Zecchini, Grosseto
Attendance: 1,362
Referee: Paolo Valeri (Italy)

9 August 2009
18:00

| Modena | 2 – 2 (a.e.t.) | Novara |
|---|---|---|
| Pinardi 65' (pen.); Giampà 97' | Report | 60' Ledesma; 104' Rubino |
Penalties
| Perna (penalty missed); Diagouraga (penalty scored); Troiano (penalty missed); Pinardi (penalty scored) | 2 – 4 | (penalty missed) Rubino; (penalty scored) Lanteri; (penalty scored) Vicentini; (penalty scored) Ledesma; (penalty scored) Bertani |

Stadio Enzo Ricci, Sassuolo
Attendance: 1,162
Referee: Leonardo Baracani (Italy)

====== Third round ======
12 November 2009
20:45

| Siena | 2 – 0 | Grosseto |
|---|---|---|
| Calaiò 59'; Larrondo 79' | Report |

Stadio Artemio Franchi, Siena
Attendance: 3,267
Referee: Brighi di Cesena (Italy)

14 August 2009
20:00

| Parma | 1 – 2 | Novara |
|---|---|---|
| Lucarelli 56' | Report | 45+1' Vicentini; 63' Bertani |

Stadio Ennio Tardini, Parma
Attendance: 2,751
Referee: Renzo Candussio (Italy)

====== Fourth round ======
25 November 2009
18:30

| Siena | 0 – 2 | Novara |
|---|---|---|
| | Report | 35', 84' González |

Stadio Artemio Franchi, Siena
Attendance: 848
Referee: Daniele Doveri (Italy)

==== Section 6 ====
First Round
Ternana | 3
Renate | 2
Perugia | 1
Nocerina | 0
Lumezzane | 3
Fano | 0

Second Round
Cesena (pso) | 2 (5)
Ternana | 2 (4)
Ancona | 1
Perugia | 0
Lumezzane | 6
Gallipoli | 0

Third Round
Atalanta | 1
Cesena | 0
Ancona | 2
Lumezzane | 3

Fourth Round
Atalanta | 0
Lumezzane | 1

===== Match details =====
====== First round ======
2 August 2009
16:00

| Ternana | 3 – 2 | Renate |
|---|---|---|
| Bacchion 13' (o.g.); Tozzi Borsoi 14', 41' | Report | 22' Farina; 70' Moretti |

Stadio Giuseppe Minelli, Pavullo nel Frignano
Attendance: 200
Referee: Mirko Mangialardi (Italy)

5 August 2009
20:30

| Perugia | 1 – 0 | Nocerina |
|---|---|---|
| Cutolo 11' | Report |

Stadio Renato Curi, Perugia
Attendance: 1,500
Referee: Gaetano Intagliata (Italy)

5 August 2009
17:00

| Lumezzane | 3 – 0 | Fano |
|---|---|---|
| Pesenti 10', 41'; Emerson 84' | Report |

Nuovo Stadio Comunale, Lumezzane
Attendance: 250
Referee: Daniele Bindoni (Italy)

====== Second round ======
9 August 2009
20:45

| Cesena | 2 – 2 (a.e.t.) | Ternana |
|---|---|---|
| Giaccherini 90+2'; Đurić 90+5' | Report | 17' Tozzi Borsoi; 44' Noviello |
Penalties
| Cusaro (penalty missed); Castiglia (penalty scored); De Feudis (penalty missed); Giaccherini (penalty scored); Schelotto (penalty scored) | 3 – 2 | (penalty missed) Noviello; (penalty missed) Perna; (penalty scored) Di Deo; (penalty scored) Danucci; (penalty missed) Bertoli |

Stadio Dino Manuzzi, Cesena
Attendance: 2,874
Referee: Gianluca Rocchi (Italy)

9 August 2009
20:45

| Ancona | 1 – 0 | Perugia |
|---|---|---|
| Mastronunzio 3' | Report |

Stadio del Conero, Ancona
Attendance: 1,585
Referee: Maurizio Ciampi (Italy)

9 August 2009
17:00

| Lumezzane | 6 – 0 | Gallipoli |
|---|---|---|
| Calliari 1'; Pintori 3', 36'; Salvi 39'; Lauria 41'; Dadson 61' | Report |

Nuovo Stadio Comunale, Lumezzane
Attendance: 300
Referee: Emiliano Gallione (Italy)

====== Third round ======
15 August 2009
20:45

| Cesena | 0 – 1 | Atalanta |
|---|---|---|
| | Report | 84' Acquafresca |

Stadio Dino Manuzzi, Cesena
Attendance: 3,799
Referee: Dino Tommasi (Italy)

15 August 2009
20:45

| Ancona | 2 – 3 | Lumezzane |
|---|---|---|
| Gerardi 29'; Mastronunzio 41' | Report | 17', 40' Lauria; 63' Marconi |

Stadio del Conero, Ancona
Attendance: 763
Referee: Luigi Nasca (Italy)

====== Fourth round ======
26 November 2009
15:00

| Atalanta | 0 – 1 | Lumezzane |
|---|---|---|
| | Report | 20' Marconi |

Stadio Atleti Azzurri d'Italia, Bergamo
Attendance: 2,500
Referee: Marco Guida (Italy)

==== Section 7 ====
First Round
Cremonese | 2
Chioggia S. | 0
Reggiana | 4
Sansepolcro | 0

Second Round
Vicenza | 1
Cremonese | 2
Empoli | 2
Reggiana | 0

Third Round
Catania | 1
Cremonese | 0
Bari | 1 (5)
Empoli (pso) | 1 (6)

Fourth Round
Catania | 2
Empoli | 0

===== Match details =====
====== First round ======
2 August 2009
20:30

| Cremonese | 2 – 0 | Chioggia Sottomarina |
|---|---|---|
| Guidetti 28'; Musetti 58' | Report |

Stadio Giovanni Zini, Cremona
Attendance: 1,500
Referee: Gianluca Benassi (Italy)

2 August 2009
21:00

| Reggiana | 4 – 0 | Sansepolcro |
|---|---|---|
| Morelli 6'; Maschio 29', 45+1'; Ferrari 90+3' | Report |

Stadio Giglio, Reggio Emilia
Attendance: 500
Referee: Michael Fabbri (Italy)

====== Second round ======
9 August 2009
20:45

| Vicenza | 1 – 2 | Cremonese |
|---|---|---|
| Botta 84' | Report | 75' Nizzetto; 90+3' Fietta |

Stadio Romeo Menti, Vicenza
Attendance: 2,122
Referee: Renzo Candussio (Italy)

9 August 2009
20:30

| Empoli | 2 – 0 | Reggiana |
|---|---|---|
| Lodi 43' (pen.); Angella 79' | Report |

Stadio Carlo Castellani, Empoli
Attendance: 1,068
Referee: Massimiliano Velotto (Italy)

====== Third round ======
15 August 2009
20:30

| Catania | 1 – 0 | Cremonese |
|---|---|---|
| Mascara 44' | Report |

Stadio Angelo Massimino, Catania
Attendance: 8,000
Referee: Massimiliano Velotto (Italy)

15 August 2009
20:45

| Bari | 1 – 1 (a.e.t.) | Empoli |
|---|---|---|
| Greco 82' (pen.) | Report | 79' (pen.) Lodi |
Penalties
| Stellini (penalty scored); Greco (penalty scored); Bonucci (penalty scored); Masiello (penalty missed); De Vezze (penalty scored) | 4 – 5 | (penalty scored) Lodi; (penalty scored) Vannucchi; (penalty scored) Éder; (penalty scored) Coralli; (penalty scored) Piccolo |

Stadio San Nicola, Bari
Attendance: 5,136
Referee: Gabriele Gava (Italy)

====== Fourth round ======
2 December 2009
15:00

| Catania | 2–0 | Empoli |
|---|---|---|
| Moretti 8'; Morimoto 74' (pen.) | Report |

Stadio Angelo Massimino, Catania
Attendance: 2,000
Referee: Paolo Valeri (Italy)

==== Section 8 ====
First Round
Foggia | 3
Viterbese | 1
Marcianise | 0
Alessandria | 2
Hellas Verona | 1
Spezia | 0

Second Round
Triestina | 1
Foggia | 0
Sassuolo | 2
Alessandria | 0
Piacenza | 1
Hellas Verona | 3

Third Round
Cagliari | 0
Triestina | 1
Sassuolo | 2
Hellas Verona | 0

Fourth Round
Triestina | 1
Sassuolo | 0

===== Match details =====
====== First round ======
2 August 2009
17:00

| Foggia | 3 – 1 | Viterbese |
|---|---|---|
| Lustrissimi 16' (o.g.); Germinale 40', 72' | Report | 79' (pen.) Ferretti |

Stadio Pino Zaccheria, Foggia
Attendance: 846
Referee: Dario Zeoli (Italy)

2 August 2009
17:00

| Real Marcianise | 0 – 2 | Alessandria |
|---|---|---|
| | Report | 38' (pen.) Artico; 57' Mateos |

Stadio Alberto Pinto, Caserta
Attendance: 350
Referee: Giuseppe Monaco (Italy)

3 August 2009
20:30

| Spezia | 0 – 1 (a.e.t.) | Hellas Verona |
|---|---|---|
| | Report | 111' Selva |

Stadio Marc'Antonio Bentegodi, Verona
Attendance: 3,208
Referee: Luca Barbeno (Italy)

====== Second round ======
9 August 2009
20:30

| Triestina | 1 – 0 (a.e.t.) | Foggia |
|---|---|---|
| Godeas 101' (pen.) | Report |

Stadio Nereo Rocco, Trieste
Attendance: 2,936
Referee: Dino Tommasi (Italy)

8 August 2009
20:45

| Sassuolo | 2 – 0 | Alessandria |
|---|---|---|
| Masucci 1'; Fusani 6' | Report |

Stadio Enzo Ricci, Sassuolo
Attendance: 1,000
Referee: Riccardo Pinzani (Italy)

9 August 2009
20:30

| Piacenza | 1 – 3 | Hellas Verona |
|---|---|---|
| Davide Moscardelli 72' | Report | 15', 34' Berrettoni; 76' Selva |

Stadio Leonardo Garilli, Piacenza
Attendance: 2,500
Referee: Luca Banti (Italy)

====== Third round ======
16 August 2009
20:00

| Triestina | 1 – 0 | Cagliari |
|---|---|---|
| Šedivec 82' | Report |

Stadio Nereo Rocco, Trieste
Attendance: 4,060
Referee: Sebastiano Peruzzo (Italy)

14 August 2009
18:00

| Sassuolo | 2 – 0 | Hellas Verona |
|---|---|---|
| Salvetti 2'; Riccio 28' | Report |

Stadio Enzo Ricci, Sassuolo
Attendance: 2,069
Referee: Paolo Mazzoleni (Italy)

====== Fourth round ======
1 December 2009
20:30

| Triestina | 1 – 0 | Sassuolo |
|---|---|---|
| Stanković 52' | Report |

Stadio Nereo Rocco, Trieste
Attendance: 1,910
Referee: Leonardo Baracani (Italy)

== Final stage ==
=== Bracket ===
Round of 16
Fiorentina | 3
Chievo | 2
Lazio | 2
Palermo | 0
Inter Milan | 1
Livorno | 0
Juventus | 3
Napoli | 0
Milan | 2
Novara | 1
Udinese | 2
Lumezzane | 0
Genoa | 1
Catania | 2
Roma | 3
Triestina | 1

Quarterfinals
Fiorentina | 3
Lazio | 2
Inter Milan | 2
Juventus | 1
Milan | 0
Udinese | 1
Catania | 0
Roma | 1

Semifinals
Fiorentina | 0 | 0 | 0
Inter Milan | 1 | 1 | 2
Udinese | 0 | 1 | 1
Roma | 2 | 0 | 2

Final
Inter Milan | 1
Roma | 0

==== Round of 16 ====
14 January 2010
16:00

| Fiorentina | 3–2 | Chievo |
|---|---|---|
| Mutu 35', 77'; Babacar 75' | Report | Granoche 7'; Bentivoglio 38' |

Stadio Artemio Franchi, Florence
Attendance: 7,000
Referee: Matteo Trefoloni (Italy)

14 January 2010
21:00

| Lazio | 2–0 | Palermo |
|---|---|---|
| Kolarov 57'; Floccari 74' | Report |

Stadio Olimpico, Rome
Attendance: 10,000
Referee: Paolo Tagliavento (Italy)

13 January 2010
20:45

| Juventus | 3–0 | Napoli |
|---|---|---|
| Diego 24'; Del Piero 77', 83' (pen.) | Report |

Stadio Olimpico di Torino, Turin
Attendance: 10,112
Referee: Andrea Romeo (Italy)

16 December 2009
21:00

| Inter Milan | 1–0 | Livorno |
|---|---|---|
| Sneijder 60' | Report |

San Siro, Milan
Attendance: 8,316
Referee: Sebastiano Peruzzo (Italy)

13 January 2010
16:00

| Milan | 2–1 | Novara |
|---|---|---|
| Inzaghi 11'; Flamini 81' | Report | González 46' |

San Siro, Milan
Attendance: 15,061
Referee: Renzo Candussio (Italy)

14 January 2010
18:30

| Udinese | 2–0 | Lumezzane |
|---|---|---|
| Lodi 45' (pen.); Corradi 60' | Report |

Stadio Friuli, Udine
Attendance: 1,794
Referee: Riccardo Tozzi (Italy)

12 January 2010
21:00

| Roma | 3–1 | Triestina |
|---|---|---|
| Brighi 45'; Vučinić 60'; Baptista 80' | Report | Della Rocca 5' (pen.) |

Stadio Olimpico, Rome
Attendance: 7,241
Referee: Emidio Morganti (Italy)

13 January 2010
18:30

| Genoa | 1–2 | Catania |
|---|---|---|
| Rossi 56' | Report | Plasmati 5', 8' |

Stadio Luigi Ferraris, Genoa
Attendance: 7,625
Referee: Massimiliano Velotto (Italy)

==== Quarter-finals ====
20 January 2010
21:00

| Fiorentina | 3–2 | Lazio |
|---|---|---|
| Mutu 9', 44'; Krøldrup 59' | Report | Zárate 50'; Rocchi 68' |

Stadio Artemio Franchi, Florence
Attendance: 10,565
Referee: Domenico Celi (Italy)

26 January 2010
21:00

| Roma | 1–0 | Catania |
|---|---|---|
| De Rossi 74' | Report |

Stadio Olimpico, Rome
Attendance: 14,479
Referee: Nicola Pierpaoli (Italy)

27 January 2010
21:00

| Milan | 0–1 | Udinese |
|---|---|---|
| | Report | Inler 56' |

San Siro, Milan
Attendance: 5,513
Referee: Andrea Gervasoni (Italy)

28 January 2010
20:45

| Inter Milan | 2–1 | Juventus |
|---|---|---|
| Lúcio 72'; Balotelli 89' | Report | Diego 10' |

San Siro, Milan
Attendance: 20,783
Referee: Antonio Damato (Italy)

==== Semi-finals ====
===== First leg =====
3 February 2010
20:45

| Inter Milan | 1–0 | Fiorentina |
|---|---|---|
| Milito 34' | Report |

San Siro, Milan
Attendance: 15,000
Referee: Paolo Tagliavento (Italy)

4 February 2010
21:00

| Roma | 2–0 | Udinese |
|---|---|---|
| Vučinić 13'; Mexès 41' | Report |

Stadio Olimpico, Rome
Attendance: 19,746
Referee: Mauro Bergonzi (Italy)

===== Second leg =====
13 April 2010
20:45

| Fiorentina | 0–1 | Inter Milan |
|---|---|---|
| | Report | Eto'o 57' |

Stadio Artemio Franchi, Florence
Attendance: 36,003
Referee: Nicola Rizzoli (Italy)

Inter Milan won 2–0 on aggregate.

21 April 2010
18:00

| Udinese | 1–0 | Roma |
|---|---|---|
| Sánchez 81' | Report |

Stadio Friuli, Udine
Attendance: 20,000
Referee: Luca Banti (Italy)

Roma won 2–1 on aggregate.

== Final ==
5 May 2010
20:45

| Internazionale | 1–0 | Roma |
|---|---|---|
| Milito 39' | Report |

Stadio Olimpico, Rome
Attendance: 55,000
Referee: Nicola Rizzoli

This victory was the first step on Inter’s path to a historic treble, as they swept the domestic double by winning Serie A and the Coppa Italia, before being crowned champions of Europe for the first time since the days of La Grande Inter, by winning the Champions League.

== Top goalscorers ==
| Rank | Player | Club | Goals |
|---|---|---|---|
| 1 | (France) Alain Baclet | Lecce | 4 |
| 1 | (Romania) Adrian Mutu | Fiorentina | 4 |
| 3 | (Italy) Fabrizio Miccoli | Palermo | 3 |
| 3 | (Italy) Simone Bentivoglio | Chievo | 3 |
| 3 | (Morocco) Rachid Arma | SPAL | 3 |
| 3 | (Argentina) Pablo Andrés González | Novara | 3 |
| 3 | (Italy) Arturo Lupoli | Ascoli | 3 |
| 3 | (Italy) Francesco Lodi | Empoli, Udinese | 3 |
| 3 | (Italy) Fabio Lauria | Lumezzane | 3 |
| 3 | (Italy) Romano Tozzi Borsoi | Ternana | 3 |
| 3 | (Italy) Francesco Ripa | Pro Patria | 3 |
