= Borin =

Borin may refer to:

- Borin Do, a village in Serbia
- Borin Van Loon (born 1952), British illustrator and comic book artist
- Davide Borin (born 1989), Italian association football player
- Frank Borin (born 1977), American music video director
  - Smith n' Borin, American filmmaking duo consisted of Borin and Ryan Smith
- Victor Borin, a character in the Netflix series Grand Army

== See also ==
- Boring (disambiguation)
- Boryń (disambiguation)
