= Daniel Semenzato =

Italian footballer (born 1987)

Personal information
- Date of birth: 11 January 1987 (age 39)
- Place of birth: Montebelluna, Italy
- Height: 1.80 m (5 ft 11 in)
- Position: Right back

Team information
- Current team: SSD Carbonera

Youth career
- Inter Milan

Senior career*
Years	Team	Apps	(Gls)
2006–2007	Montichiari	28	(0)
2007–2008	PortoSummaga	2	(0)
2008–2009	Venezia	27	(1)
2009–2010	Frosinone	18	(0)
2010–2011	Cittadella	5	(0)
2011	→ Como (loan)	13	(0)
2011–2012	Cremonese	26	(0)
2012–2013	Lecce	4	(0)
2013	Treviso	10	(0)
2013–2016	Bassano	83	(10)
2016–2017	Pordenone	41	(5)
2017–2018	Catania	27	(0)
2018–2020	Pordenone	49	(2)
2020–2022	Bari	29	(0)
2022–2023	Viterbese	41	(3)
2023–2024	Luparense	19	(1)
2025	Licata	10	(1)
2025–	SSD Carbonera		

International career
2003–2004	Italy U17	7	(0)
2005	Italy U19	3	(0)
- * Club domestic league appearances and goals as of 15 October 2026

Daniel Semenzato (born 11 January 1987) is an Italian footballer who plays as a right back for SSD Carbonera.

== Club career ==
=== Internazionale ===
Born in Montebelluna, Veneto, Semenzato on 11 January 1987, he started his career at Inter Milan, as first as a midfielder, played from Giovanissimi Nazionali team to the top team of the youth rank – Primavera (from 2004 to 2006). He also played for the first team in friendlies in 2004–05, 2005–06 season and 2006–07 season.

=== Lega Pro clubs ===
On 31 August 2006, he was sold to Serie C2 club Montichiari in co-ownership deal. He was the regular of the team, however he was on the bench in relegation play-out against PortoSummaga, and replacing right back Paolo Zaccagnini in the return leg. Montichiari relegated to Serie D that season.

In June 2007, he was bought back by Internazionale. and re-sold to PortoSummaga. Inter also bought Montichiari team-mate Marco Filippini from the relegated side. Semenzato only made 1 league appearance for the promotion playoffs winner.

In July 2008, he left for Lega Pro Prima Divisione (ex-Serie C1) club Venezia. He often played as the starting XI, but again put on the bench in relegation playout. He played 90 minutes in the return leg, this time Venezia survived from the play-out but expelled from professional league due to bankrupt in July.

=== Frosinone ===
In July 2009, he was signed by Serie B club Frosinone as free agent. He made his club debut on 15 August 2009, the second match of the season and of the Cup. He was the starting right back in that narrowly win Serie A club Bologna by penalty shootout. But in the next match, he lost the starting place to Lorenzo Del Prete on 21 August, the opening match of Frosinone in Serie B. Semenzato replaced left midfielder Simone Basso in the 81st minute on that match. That match Frosinone winning Salernitana 2–1. He waited until round 5 to play his first match as starter, due to Del Prete was unavailable in the last minute. He started again in round 13 (7 November 2009) against Gallipoli due to Del Prete's fitness and again in round 15 (28 November 2009), and from round 21 (9 January 2010) to round 23 (23 January) Coach Francesco Moriero also used Nicholas Guidi as emergency right back but soon used Semenzato since round 21. After left back Antonio Bocchetti was unavailable in round 25, he changed to play as an emergency left back and replaced suspended Del Prete in the next round. Semenzato ahead healthy Del Prete as right back from round 32 to 36 (missed round 35). Since round 37, Moriero took Del Prete back to starting XI and new coach Guido Carboni resumed the same line-up for the relegation threatening team. He started his 13th in Serie B and the last one with Frosinone on 15 May (round 40), to replace the unavailable Del Prete. then the coach used Guidi as emergency right back again. Frosinone finished as the 16th that season, just 2 points above the teams that had to play relegation playout.

=== Cittadella ===
In August 2010, he was sold to fellow Serie B team Cittadella. He was the understudy of Andrea Manucci but started as emergency right back at the first match of the season (also the first match in the cup). In the next match, the opening match of Cittadella in Serie B, coach Claudio Foscarini used Gianluca Nocentini as right back instead.

On 31 January 2011, Semenzato was signed by Como.

=== Return to Serie C ===
In June 2011, he was exchanged with Ferdinando Vitofrancesco of Cremonese. In October 2012 he joined Lecce and moved to Treviso in January 2013.

In summer 2013, Semenzato played for Vicenza as a trialist.

On 30 August 2013, he was signed by Bassano Virtus. His contract was renewed on 23 May 2014.

In the summer of 2016, he moved to Pordenone. On 11 July 2017 he signed a two-year contract with Catania. He returned to Pordenone on 17 July 2018.

On 29 September 2020, he signed a two-year contract with Bari.

On 20 January 2022, he moved to Viterbese.

== International career ==
Semenzato capped for Azzurrini in under-17 and under-19 level. He played for U17 team at 2004 UEFA European Under-17 Football Championship qualification (2 games) and in the elite round (2 games). For U19 team, he capped once at 2006 UEFA European Under-19 Football Championship qualification (called-up along with team-mate Giacomo Bindi and Matteo Momentè). That match Italy would qualify if winning Republic of Ireland, and Semenzato ahead Alessio Cerci as starter. Semenzato was replaced by Cerci in the 30th minute and Cerci scored the only goal for Azzurrini, eventually Italy lost 1–4 and failed to qualify to the elite round.

== Honours ==
- Coppa Italia Primavera: 2006
