= Corcione =

Corcione is an Italian surname. Notable people with the surname include:

- Domenico Corcione (1929–2020), Italian general
- Nicolas Corcione (born 1969), president of the Grupo Corcione Foundation

== See also ==
- Carcione
