= Jean Martianay =

French Benedictine scholar

Jean Martianay (30 December 1647 – 16 June 1717) was a French Benedictine scholar of the Congregation of St. Maur. He is known for his edition of Jerome.

== Life ==
Martianay was born at Saint-Sever in the Diocese of Aire. He entered the Benedictines at an early age, and devoted himself to Biblical studies, Greek and Hebrew.

A circular letter of Martianay's is still extant, in which he begs the co-operation of Benedictine abbeys in the work of producing a critical and complete edition of Jerome's writings. He spent over thirty years in searching the libraries of France for information.

== Works ==
Ziegelbauer says (op. cit. below, II, 58) that Martianay completed alone the edition of Jerome's works. The "Divina Bibliotheca" - the Hieronymian edition of the Vulgate - was in fact executed with the collaboration of Antoine Pouget.

Martianay's fame as editor of Jerome has somewhat eclipsed his wider repute as a Biblical scholar. He undertook the work on Jerome to meets the need of such an edition, for all who devoted themselves to Biblical research.

He taught Scripture at Arles, Bordeaux, and Carcassonne. In addition, he published many critical works on Biblical questions; he wrote a treatise on inspiration against Richard Simon; also a vindication of the Hebrew text and of the chronology given in the Latin Vulgate. He died, aged 69, at Saint Germain-des-Prés, Paris.

Martianay also treated of: the history of the Biblical canon; the French versions of the New Testament in the "Tentamen Versionis": and wrote a treatise on "The Method of explaining Holy Scripture". In 1711 he published the life of a nun in the monastery of Beaume.

Martianay contributed to Biblical criticism by his edition of the "Divina Bibliotheca", or Jerome's text of the Vulgate. It attempted to reproduce the text, with scanty materials; he tells us at the close of his prolegomena what manuscripts he had at his disposal, six in all, the most important of which was the MS. Sangermanensis. Martianay published (1695) a separate collation of this text in his edition of the old Latin version of the Gospel of Matthew and of the Epistle of James. This collation, reproduced by Bianchini in his "Evangelium Quadruplex", was considered faulty; a correction of it is in the first volume of Wordsworth and White, "Old Latin Biblical Texts".

Ziegelbauer mentions also another work of Martianay, never printed, namely, an edition of the Vulgate with variant readings suggested by the Hebrew and Greek texts, and furnished with a series of references to the parallel passages. He also published the three psalters of Jerome; these appeared in French. Lastly should be mentioned his "New Testament in French" (2 vols., Paris, 1712).
