= Artuso =

Artuso is an Italian surname. Notable people with the surname include:

- Elisabetta Artuso (born 1974), Italian middle-distance runner
- Alberto Artuso (born 1989), Italian footballer
- Giuseppe Artuso (born 1956), Italian rugby union player and coach
