= Ciolli =

Ciolli is an Italian surname. Notable people with the surname include:

- Andrea Ciolli (born 1989), Italian footballer
- Emilio Ciolli (1933–2012), Italian cyclist
