= Panariello =

Panariello is an Italian surname. Notable people with the surname include:

- Aniello Panariello (born 1988), Italian footballer
- Giorgio Panariello (born 1960), Italian comedian, actor, director, and television presenter
