= Francesco Battaglia =

Francesco Battaglia may refer to:

- Francesco Battaglia (footballer) (born 1985), Italian footballer
- Francesco Battaglia (architect) (1701–1788), father of Antonino, father-in-law of Stefano Ittar
