= Bianchini =

Bianchini is an Italian surname. Notable people with the surname include:

- Adhemar Bianchini (1940–2005), Brazilian footballer
- Alfredo Bianchini (1940–2025), Italian politician
- Angela Bianchini (1921–2018), Italian fiction writer and literary critic
- Brian Bianchini (1978–2004), American male model
- Francesco Bianchini (1662–1729), Italian philosopher and scientist, after whom Bianchini (lunar crater) and Bianchini (Martian crater) are named
- Frank Bianchini (born 1961), American football player
- Gina Bianchini, founder of the Ning social networking platform
- Giovanni Bianchini (1410–c.1449), Italian astronomer
- Giovanni Battista Bianchini (after 1650 – 1708), Italian composer, organist, and choir conductor
- Giuseppe Bianchini (1704–1764), Italian Oratorian, biblical, historical, and liturgical scholar
- Leslie Bianchini (born 1947), Playboy magazine Playmate of the Month
- Lorenzo Bianchini (born 1989), Italian professional football player
- Orlando Bianchini (born 1955), Italian hammer thrower
- Stefano Bianchini (born 1970), Italian mathematician
- Vincenzo Bianchini (1903–2000), Italian artist
- Victor Bianchini (born 1938), American judge
