= Quintavalle =

Quintavalle may refer to:

- Antonio Quintavalle (1688 – c.1724), Italian opera composer
- Bernard of Quintavalle (died 1241), son of Berardello, one of the first followers of St. Francis of Assisi
- Giulia Quintavalle (born 1983), Italian judoka

== See also ==
- Quintavalla
