= Borsoi =

Borsoi is an Italian surname. Notable people with the surname include:

- Gino Borsoi (born 1974), Italian former Grand Prix motorcycle road racer
- Romano Tozzi Borsoi (born 1979), Italian footballer
