= Bocchetti =

Bocchetti is a surname. Notable people with the surname include:

- Antonio Bocchetti (born 1980), Italian footballer
- Antonio Bocchetti (born 1990), Italian footballer
- Mike Bocchetti, American comedian, actor, and writer
- Salvatore Bocchetti (born 1986), Italian footballer
