= Musetti =

Musetti is an Italian surname. Notable people with the surname include:

- Lorenzo Musetti (born 2002), Italian tennis player;
- Riccardo Musetti (born 1983), Italian footballer;
- Valentino Musetti (born 1943), Italian-born English stunt performer and racing driver.
