= Emanuele Ameltonis =

Italian footballer

Personal information
- Date of birth: 21 May 1987 (age 39)
- Place of birth: Rome, Italy
- Position: Goalkeeper

Senior career*
Years	Team	Apps	(Gls)
2005–2006	Aprilia	32	(0)
2006–2007	Centobuchi	30	(0)
2007–2008	Teramo	1	(0)
2008–2009	Polisportiva Val di Sangro	33	(0)
2009–2010	Cosenza	0	(0)
2011	Melfi	4	(0)
2011–2012	Val di Sangro SSD	1	(0)
2012–2017	York Region Shooters		

Managerial career
- 2018: Unionville Milliken SC
- * Club domestic league appearances and goals

Emanuele Ameltonis (born May 21, 1987) is a former Italian footballer who played as a goalkeeper and a football manager.

== Club career ==
=== Italy ===
Ameltonis played with Aprilia in the Serie D for the 2005–06 season. After a season in the Lazio region, he signed with league rivals Centobuchi. In 2007, he joined Teramo in the Serie C2. In his debut season in the fourth division, he appeared in one match. He remained in the fourth tier the following season by signing with Atessa Val di Sangro. He was named the league's top goalkeeper throughout his time with Val di Sangro.

In the summer of 2009, he signed with Serie C1 side Cosenza Calcio. His contract with Cosenza was a co-ownership agreement with Serie A side Siena. Ameltonis debuted for Cosenza in the 2009–10 Coppa Italia on August 10, 2009, against Grosseto as a substitute for Ugo Gabrieli. After a single season with Cosenza, he left the club in the summer of 2010.

In 2011, he returned to the fourth division to sign with Melfi. Ameltonis returned to his former club Atessa Val di Sangro for the 2011–12 season.

=== Canada ===
In the summer of 2012, Ameltonis played abroad in the Canadian Soccer League with the York Region Shooters. In his debut season in the CSL circuit, he helped the club secure a playoff berth by finishing fifth in the league's first division. Their playoff journey concluded in the semifinal round after a defeat by the Montreal Impact Academy. He re-signed with the Vaughan-based team the following year. He assisted the club in clinching a playoff berth by finishing as runners-up in the division. Once more the Shooters were eliminated in the early stages of the postseason this time by London City.

Ameltonis returned for the 2014 season. In his third season with York Region, he helped the team produce a perfect season by initially claiming the divisional title. In the opening round of the postseason, the Shooters defeated Brampton City United. Following their victory over Brampton, the Shooters would qualify for the championship finals by eliminating the North York Astros. Ameltonis participated in the championship match where Vaughan defeated Toronto Croatia in a penalty shootout.

The 2015 season marked his fourth season with the club. Throughout the 2015 campaign, he assisted the team in securing another playoff. In the opening round of the playoffs, the Shooters defeated Burlington SC. In the subsequent round, Toronto Croatia eliminated them from the tournament. Ameltonis renewed his contract with York Region for the 2016 season. He aided the club in winning another divisional title. York Region would defeat Milton SC in the preliminary round of the playoffs. In the next round, Hamilton City eliminated the Shooters in a penalty shootout.

The 2017 season marked his final spell in the Southern Ontario-based circuit. In his final campaign with York Region, the club would win the championship title again by defeating Scarborough SC.

== Managerial career ==
He was the head coach for Unionville Milliken SC in 2018. Following his retirement from professional soccer, he formed an academy for training goalkeepers.

== Honors ==
York Region Shooters

- CSL Championship: 2014, 2017
- Canadian Soccer League First Division: 2014, 2016

Individual

- Lega Pro Seconda Divisione Goalkeeper of the Year: 2008–09
