= Carcione =

Carcione is an Italian surname. Notable people with the surname include:

- Imperio Carcione (born 1982), Italian footballer
- Joe Carcione (1914–1988), American consumer advocate
