= Paolo Carbone =

Italian professional footballer

Personal information
- Date of birth: 13 July 1982 (age 44)
- Place of birth: Genoa, Italy
- Height: 1.86 m (6 ft 1 in)
- Position: Defender

Youth career
- 2000–2002: Sampdoria

Senior career*
Years	Team	Apps	(Gls)
1999–2000	Angelo Baiardo	13	(0)
2000–2002	Sampdoria	0	(0)
2002–2003	Foggia	0	(0)
2003–2004	Acqui	22	(1)
2004–2005	Nova Colligiana	22	(0)
2005–2010	Bellinzona	83	(1)
2009	→ Chiasso (loan)	7	(0)
2010–2011	Savona	6	(0)
- * Club domestic league appearances and goals

Paolo Carbone (born 13 July 1982) is an Italian former professional footballer.

== Club career ==
=== Early career ===
Carbone, along with Riccardo Musetti, were exchanged with Johan Michel Romeo and Roberto D'Auria of Napoli in 2001 in a co-ownership deal. In June 2002, Napoli acquired the full registration rights.

=== Bellinzona ===
After he spent his career in the Italian lower divisions, he left for the Swiss Challenge League side Bellinzona in July 2005, which the club was from the Italian-speaking region of Switzerland.

After the club promoted him to the Swiss Super League in 2008, he was loaned to 1.Liga club Chiasso in March 2009.

=== Savona ===
In August 2010, he returned to Italy for Savona.

== Honours ==
- Swiss Cup: 2008
