= Rachid Arma =

Moroccan footballer

Personal information
- Date of birth: 16 January 1985 (age 41)
- Place of birth: Agadir, Morocco
- Height: 1.90 m (6 ft 3 in)
- Position: Forward

Team information
- Current team: Altavilla

Youth career
- US Prova
- Sambonifacese

Senior career*
Years	Team	Apps	(Gls)
2004–2008	Sambonifacese	107	(43)
2008–2009	SPAL	35	(16)
2009–2010	Torino	12	(2)
2010–2011	Vicenza	9	(1)
2011–2012	SPAL	34	(18)
2012–2013	Carpi	30	(9)
2013–2015	Pisa	67	(31)
2015–2016	Reggiana	32	(10)
2016–2017	Pordenone	36	(17)
2017–2018	Triestina	34	(8)
2018–2020	LR Vicenza	56	(10)
2020–2022	Virtus Verona	33	(10)
2022	Chievo-Sona	15	(0)
2022–2023	USD Breno	13	(6)
2023–2024	Caldiero	36	(9)
2024–	Altavilla	0	(0)
- * Club domestic league appearances and goals as of 5 May 2024

Rachid Arma (born 16 January 1985) is a Moroccan footballer who plays as a forward for Italian club Altavilla.

== Career ==
Rachid Arma was born in Agadir. In 1989, his father left Morocco to move to San Bonifacio, Italy, for work purposes, and the rest of the family, including Rachid, joined him later in 1995.

In 2004, he was promoted into Sambonifacese's first team, and played four consecutive Serie D seasons with the Verona club, being instrumental in their promotion to Lega Pro Seconda Divisione during the 2007–08 season thanks to his 21 goals.

=== SPAL ===
He was consequently noted by a number of professional clubs, and was acquired by Lega Pro Prima Divisione outfit SPAL during the 2008 summer transfer window. With SPAL, he immediately managed to achieve some space under the guidance of head coach Aldo Dolcetti, and provided a 13-goal tally in his first professional season. He then achieved national coverage after he managed to score two goals to Serie A side Palermo in the third round of the Coppa Italia 2009–10; the match ended with a 4–2 win for the Sicilians, but Arma was subsequently noted by Serie B giants Torino and was acquired by the granata in co-ownership deal only days after his impressive performance in the Coppa Italia, which also proved to be his final game with SPAL.

In June 2010, SPAL bought back Arma from Torino. In July 2010, he was acquired by Serie B club Cittadella in a co-ownership bid, with Francesco Battaglia moved to opposite direction . On 31 August 2010, Vicenza Calcio acquired the co-ownership from Cittadella, for a peppercorn fee of €500. He returned to SPAL for a second spell in July 2011 in temporary deal. In June 2012 SPAL bought back Arma for €84,115.

=== Carpi ===
After SPAL went bankrupted, Arma left for Carpi F.C. 1909.

=== Pisa ===
On 2 August 2013 Arma was signed by A.C. Pisa 1909, in Lega Pro Prima Divisione.

=== Reggiana ===
On 24 July 2015 Arma left Pisa and moved to A.C. Reggiana 1919. In reggiana he became the best striker of the team.

=== Pordenone ===
On 30 June 2016, he joined Pordenone. But at the end of the season, he decides to terminate his contract to join Triestina.

=== L.R. Vicenza Virtus ===
On 18 August 2018 Arma joined Serie C club L.R. Vicenza Virtus, a phoenix club of Vicenza Calcio.

=== Later years ===
On 11 September 2020 he joined Virtus Verona on a 2-year contract.

After two seasons with Virtus Verona, in September 2022 he signed for Serie D amateurs Chievo-Sona.
