= Quintavalla =

Quintavalla is an Italian surname. Notable people with the surname include:

- Fausta Quintavalla (born 1959), Italian javelin thrower
- Francesco Quintavalla (born 1982), Italian footballer
- Pedro Julio Quintavalla (1850–?), Chilean military officer
