= Marco Veronese =

Italian footballer and coach

Personal information
- Date of birth: 22 May 1976 (age 50)
- Place of birth: Cinisello Balsamo, Italy
- Height: 1.79 m (5 ft 10 in)
- Position: Forward

Team information
- Current team: Tirana (assistant)

Youth career
- –1994: Inter Milan

Senior career*
Years	Team	Apps	(Gls)
1994–1998	Inter Milan	3	(0)
1995–1996	→ Reggina (loan)	16	(0)
1996–1997	→ Monza (loan)	18	(0)
1997–1998	→ Prato (loan)	30	(6)
1998–2003	Chievo	20	(2)
1999–2000	→ Alzano Virescit (loan)	19	(1)
2000–2002	→ Modena (loan)	44	(9)
2002–2003	→ Vicenza (loan)	17	(0)
2003–2005	Spezia	51	(11)
2005–2007	Pavia	56	(25)
2007–2008	Venezia	29	(11)
2008–2009	Cesena	23	(4)
2009–2010	Lecco	11	(2)
2011–2012	Pavia	17	(2)
Total		354	(73)

Managerial career
- 2012–2014: Pavia U19
- 2013–2014: Pavia (caretaker)
- 2014–2015: Monza (assistant)
- 2015–2016: Cremonese (assistant)
- 2017: Albania (assistant)
- 2017: Alavés (assistant)
- 2019: ASD Vigor Carpaneto
- 2019–2021: Parma U19
- 2021–2022: Torino U17
- 2022–2023: Torino U16
- 2024: Triestina (assistant)
- 2024–2025: Ceahlăul Piatra Neamț
- 2025–: Tirana (assistant)
- * Club domestic league appearances and goals

Marco Veronese (born 22 May 1976) is an Italian football manager and former player, who played as a forward, currently assistant coach at Kategoria Superiore club Tirana.

== Biography ==
=== Inter Milan ===
Born in Cinisello Balsamo in the Province of Milan, Marco, along with his elder brother Simone, started their career at Inter Milan. He played his first match for first team and at Serie A on 30 October 1994, a 1–0 win to Reggiana. He played 3 matches in the season, all in Serie A.

In the next season, he was farmed to Reggina of Serie B, where he played 16 league appearances. He then played two seasons in Serie C1 for Monza and Prato.

=== Chievo ===
In mid-1998 he secured a long-term contract with Serie B club Chievo. He played 20 league matches with 2 goals for the Serie B mid-table team.

In the next season, he left for Serie B newcomer Alzano Virescit on loan, where he scored once only. In 2000, he left for Serie C1 again, for Modena, where he won the champion.

Veronese remained with Modena, and played 17 league appearances for the club for the Serie B runner-up. Although Veronese failed to secure a permanent move and followed Modena to Serie A, he earned Serie B mid-table team Vicenza signed him on loan with option to purchase, as part of Ivano Della Morte deal. He rejoined former teammate Andrea Zanchetta.

=== Spezia & Pavia ===
In 2003–04 season, he joined Spezia of Serie C1, a team partially owned by his former club Internazionale. He won Coppa Italia Serie C with club. Co-current with Internazionale sold their shares, Veronese joined Pavia at the same division. He finally scored regular with 13 and 11 goals, in although Pavia relegated in 2007.

=== Late career ===
He joined Venezia which last season lost in promotion playoffs. He scored 11 goals for the team but just finished in mid-table. In July 2008, he joined Cesena which newly relegated back to Serie C1. He scored only 4 goals with the Lega Pro Prima Divisione Champion. In August 2009, he returned to Lombardy for Lecco. He signed a 2-year contract.

In January 2011 he was exchanged with Stefano Del Sante of Pavia.

== Managerial career ==
Following his retirement Veronese started as assistant coach of A.C. Pavia Primavera team. On 6 December 2013, after the exemption of Alessio Pala, he was named as head coach of the first team, then on 10 January 2014 after three days he was replaced by Patrizio Bensi.

On 28 June 2014 he became assistant coach of Fulvio Pea at Monza in Lega Pro. The following season, he became assistant coach of Cremonese.

On 19 January 2017 Veronese was appointed as assistant manager of Gianni De Biasi at the Albania national football team. He left the position at the end of the season. In September 2017, he joined Deportivo Alavés, once again as the assistant manager of Di Biasi.

On 5 March 2019, he was appointed as manager of ASD Vigor Carpaneto.

On 23 July 2019 he was hired by Parma as their Primavera Under-19 youth coach.

== Honours ==
Modena

- Serie C1: 2000–01
- Supercoppa di Serie C: 2001

Spezia

- Coppa Italia Serie C: 2004–05

Cesena

- Lega Pro Prima Divisione: 2008–09
