= Stefano Del Sante =

Italian footballer

Personal information
- Full name: Stefano Del Sante
- Date of birth: 13 January 1987 (age 39)
- Place of birth: Perugia, Italy
- Height: 1.87 m (6 ft 1 1/2 in)
- Position: Forward

Team information
- Current team: A.S.D. Fabriano Cerreto

Youth career
- Perugia
- 2005–2006: Fiorentina

Senior career*
Years	Team	Apps	(Gls)
2005	Perugia	2	(0)
2006–2009	Fiorentina	0	(0)
2006–2007	→ Pizzighettone (loan)	11	(1)
2007–2009	→ Varese (loan)	74	(26)
2009–2011	Varese	28	(2)
2010–2011	→ Pavia (loan)	18	(3)
2011	→ Lecco (loan)	13	(2)
2011–2013	Mantova	67	(23)
2013–2015	Vigor Lamezia	61	(17)
2015–2016	Pavia	8	(1)
2016–2017	Juve Stabia	27	(5)
2017	Ancona	12	(2)
2017–2018	Lucchese	17	(2)
2018–2019	Prato	18	(4)
2019	ASD Cannara	13	(3)
2019–2022	Bastia	10	(0)
2022-	Fabriano Cerreto		(5)
- * Club domestic league appearances and goals as of 22:08, 28 April 2020 (UTC)

Stefano Del Sante (born 13 January 1987) is an Italian footballer who plays as a forward for Eccellenza marche club A.S.D. Fabriano Cerreto.

== Career ==
Del Sante started his career at hometown club Perugia where he played twice in Serie B 2004–05. After the bankrupt of Perugia, he chose not to follow the new team at Serie C1 and joined Fiorentina's Primavera team. In summer 2006, he was loaned to Serie C1 side Pizzighettone but after a handful appearances, he joined Serie C2 side Varese on loan in January 2007. In 2008–09 season, he scored 15 goals for the Lega Pro Seconda Divisione Champion as team top scorer.

In June 2009, Varese signed him in co-ownership deal for €120,000. But at Lega Pro Prima Divisione, he had to compete with Matteo Momentè and Pietro Tripoli to pair for Osariemen Ebagua in 2 strikers or 3 strikers formation. He won promotion to Serie B as runner-up and playoffs winner.

In July 2010 he was loaned back to Prima Divisione, for Pavia, but in January 2011 he was exchanged with Marco Veronese of Lecco.

On 12 July 2013 Del Sante was signed by Vigor Lamezia.

On 30 June 2015 Del Sante was signed by Pavia.

In January 2016 he is transferred to Juve Stabia; in January 2017 he moved to Ancona.

On 28 September 2018, Del Sante signed for A.C. Prato. In August 2019, he moved to ASD Cannara. He left the club in December 2019 and joined fellow league club A.C. Bastia 1924.

== Honours ==
Varese

- Lega Pro Seconda Divisione: 2009
