= Alain Baclet =

French footballer (born 1986)

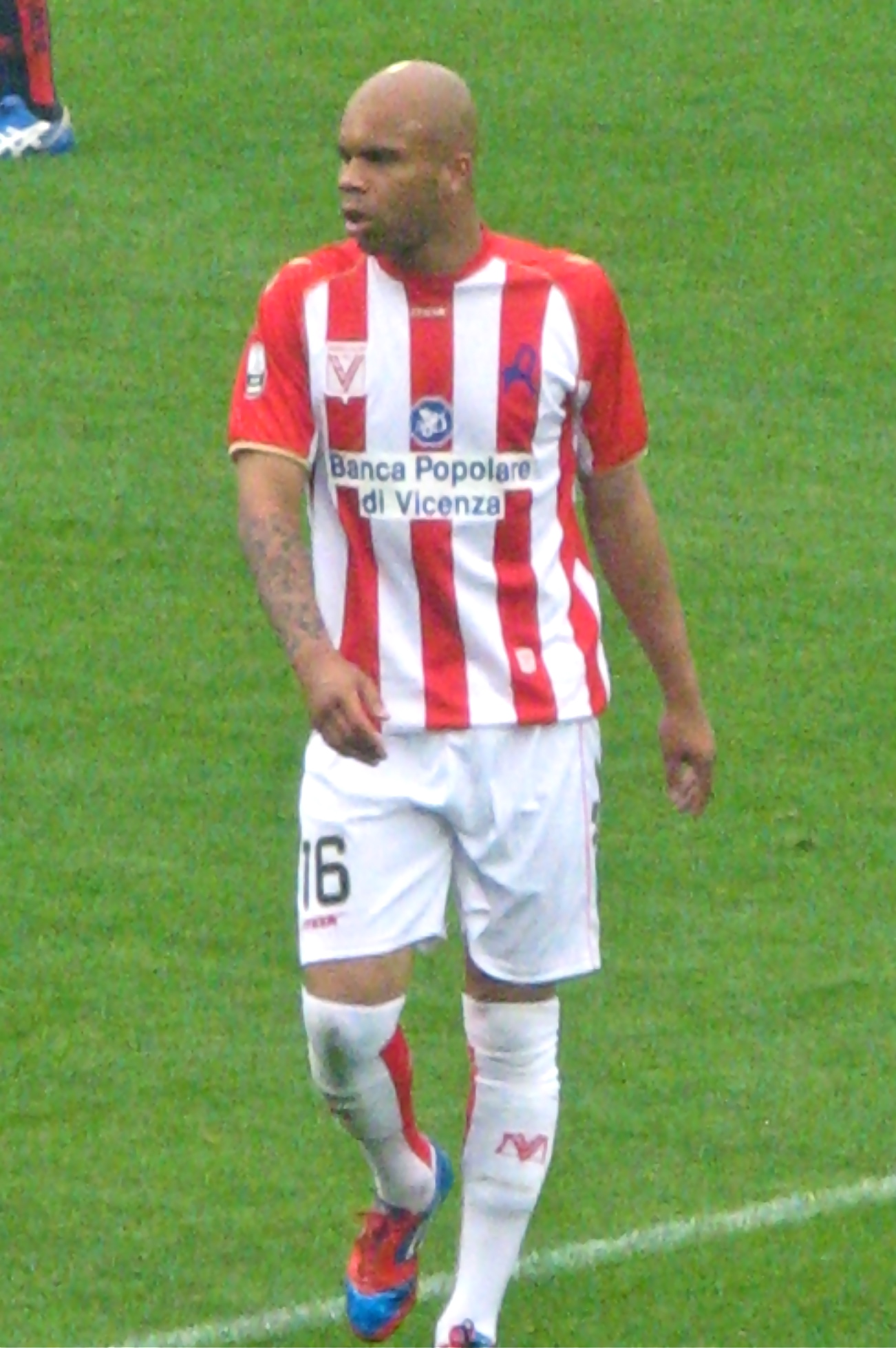
- Baclet in 2012

Personal information
- Full name: Alain-Pierre Baclet
- Date of birth: 26 May 1986 (age 40)
- Place of birth: Lille, France
- Height: 1.80 m (5 ft 11 in)
- Position: Forward

Team information
- Current team: ASD Terre Di Acaya E Roca 2017

Youth career
- 2001–2004: Lille

Senior career*
Years	Team	Apps	(Gls)
2004–2005	Russi	26	(?)
2005–2006	Gela	21	(1)
2006–2009	Arezzo	27	(11)
2006–2007	→ Juve Stabia (loan)	21	(4)
2007–2008	→ Juve Stabia (loan)	26	(5)
2009–2010	Lecce	30	(6)
2010–2012	Vicenza	27	(3)
2011	→ Frosinone (loan)	10	(0)
2012–2015	Novara	8	(1)
2013–2014	→ Casertana (loan)	19	(2)
2014–2015	→ Pro Patria (loan)	25	(5)
2015–2016	Martina Franca	27	(13)
2016–2019	Cosenza	72	(16)
2019–2020	Reggina	14	(2)
2019–2020	→ Virtus Francavilla (loan)	12	(0)
2020–2022	Potenza	26	(6)
2022–2023	Promosport		
2023–2025	ASD DB Rossoblù Città Di Luzzi		
2025–	ASD Terre Di Acaya E Roca 2017		
- * Club domestic league appearances and goals as of 4 November 2026

Alain-Pierre Baclet (born 26 May 1986) is a French footballer who plays as a forward for ASD Terre Di Acaya E Roca 2017.

== Career ==
Baclet played on Lille OSC's youth teams from 2001 to 2004, then moved to Italy to begin his professional career.

In July 2009, he was signed by U.S. Lecce in co-ownership deal. He had an impressive start, scoring four goals in a Coppa Italia match against Vico Equense and some decisive last-minute goals in the league, but spent most of the season on the bench. On 21 August 2009, the opening match of Serie B, he scored twice in his Serie B debut. He only started 12 league matches in 30 league appearances. In June 2010, Lecce bought him outright.

In July 2010, he was sent to Serie B side Vicenza in a co-ownership deal, for €400,000, as part of Davide Brivio's deal. In June 2012 Vicenza acquired Baclet outright for free.

On 30 August 2012, Baclet was swapped for Alex Pinardi of Novara. Both players were tagged for €1 million as well as signing a three-year contract, thus made both clubs had a paper profit of €733,334 and €812,076 respectively.

On 3 August 2013, he was signed by Casertana, as well as on 1 September 2014 left for Pro Patria.

In the 2015–16 season he played for Martina Franca.

In June 2016 he signed for Cosenza, becoming a crucial player in the 2017–18 season with five goals in the play-off rounds, which saw Cosenza reach promotion to Serie B for the first time in 15 years.

In January 2019 he moved to Reggina. On 5 August 2019, he was loaned to Virtus Francavilla.

After having played two seasons at the Serie C level with Potenza, on 19 October 2022 Baclet moved down to amateur football by joining Lamezia Terme-based Eccellenza club Promosport.

== Honour ==
- Coppa Italia top scorer: 2009–10
