= US Darfo Boario SSD =

Italian football club

Darfo Boario
- Full name: Unione Sportiva Darfo Boario Società Sportiva Dilettantistica
- Founded: 1937
- Ground: Stadio Comunale di Darfo Boario Terme, Darfo Boario Terme, Italy
- Capacity: 1,220
- Chairman: Walter Venturi
- Manager: Alex Bonetti
- League: Promozione Lombardia
- 2018–19: Serie D/B, 14th (relegated after play-out)
Home colours	Away colours

Unione Sportiva Darfo Boario Società Sportiva Dilettantistica is an Italian association football club located in Darfo Boario Terme, Lombardy. It currently plays in Promozione Lombardia.

== History ==
The club was founded in 1937.

=== Serie D ===
In the season 1987–88 it was promoted, for the first time, to Interregionale and in the season 1997–98 after 11 seasons it was relegated to Eccellenza Lombardy.

In the season 2005–06 it was promoted again to Serie D and in the season 2011–12 after 7 seasons was to be relegated to Eccellenza Lombardy, but the club will continue to play in Serie D after being readmitted to fill the vacancies created.

== Colors and badge ==
Their colors are green and black.

== Current squad ==
As of 31 December 2018

Note: Flags indicate national team as defined under FIFA eligibility rules; some limited exceptions apply. Players may hold more than one non-FIFA nationality.

No.	Pos.	Nation	Player
—	GK	ITA	Antonino De Chiara
—	GK	ITA	Semeh Rdifi
—	DF	ITA	Davide Daeder
—	DF	ITA	Giorgio Dorigo
—	DF	ITA	Massimo Fattori
—	DF	ITA	Nicholas Filippi
—	DF	ITA	Matteo Milesi
—	DF	ITA	Fabio Lebran
—	DF	ITA	Marco Savoini
—	DF	ITA	Davide Monteleone
—	DF	ITA	Davide Ondei
—	MF	ARG	Alvaro Firmin Bouza Bessero
—	MF	BRA	Leonardo Dias Consulin
—	MF	GHA	Papa Dadson

No.	Pos.	Nation	Player
—	MF	ITA	Alberto Forlani
—	MF	ITA	Gabriele Mondini
—	MF	ITA	Gabriele Prandini
—	MF	ITA	Gianluca Rachele
—	MF	ITA	Marco Taboni
—	MF	ITA	Nicolò Quaggiotto
—	MF	ITA	Riccardo Vaglio
—	MF	ITA	Francesco Mirko Velardi
—	MF	ITA	Francesco Zanardini
—	FW	ITA	Mattia Baccanelli
—	FW	ITA	Davide Sinigaglia
—	FW	ITA	Christian Spampatti
—	FW	ITA	Federico Peli
—	FW	ITA	Simone Vitali
