= List of Italian football transfers summer 2010 =

For Italian football transfers summer 2010 see the following articles:

- List of Italian football transfers summer 2010 (July)
- List of Italian football transfers summer 2010 (August)
- List of Italian football transfers summer 2010 (co-ownership)
