= Stefano Botta =

Italian football midfielder

Personal information
- Date of birth: 3 November 1986 (age 40)
- Place of birth: Como, Italy
- Height: 1.73 m (5 ft 8 in)
- Position: Midfielder

Team information
- Current team: SC Ligorna 1922

Youth career
- AC Lugano

Senior career*
Years	Team	Apps	(Gls)
2004–2005	AC Lugano	31	(0)
2005–2009	Genoa	40	(2)
2007–2008	→ Cesena (loan)	27	(0)
2008–2009	→ Vicenza (loan)	39	(2)
2009–2012	Vicenza	113	(5)
2012–2014	Ternana	27	(0)
2014–2015	Virtus Entella	42	(1)
2015–2016	Lucchese	18	(0)
2016–2017	Reggina	35	(1)
2017–2018	Bassano Virtus	27	(0)
2018–2020	Vis Pesaro	33	(0)
2020–	SC Ligorna 1922	57	(1)
- * Club domestic league appearances and goals as of 24 September 2023

Stefano Botta (born 3 November 1986) is an Italian football midfielder who plays for Serie D club SC Ligorna 1922.

== Life ==
He was born in Como and is half Swiss.

Botta scored on the first match of the 2009–10 season, in a Coppa Italia match 1-2 lost to Cremonese.

On 1 July 2017, he joined Serie C side Bassano.
