= Fabio Lauria =

Italian footballer

Personal information
- Date of birth: 30 August 1986 (age 40)
- Place of birth: Naples, Italy
- Height: 1.66 m (5 ft 5 in)
- Position: Forward

Team information
- Current team: Usinese
- Number: 10

Youth career
- Ternana

Senior career*
Years	Team	Apps	(Gls)
2004–2005	Reggiana	7	(1)
2005–2009	Arezzo	22	(4)
2006–2007	→ Martina (loan)	23	(3)
2007–2008	→ Lanciano (loan)	31	(4)
2009–2011	Lumezzane	55	(7)
2011–2013	Venezia	60	(17)
2013–2014	Matera	15	(4)
2014	Cuneo	13	(2)
2014–2015	Delta Rovigo	36	(17)
2015–2016	Parma	26	(7)
2016–2017	Campodarsego	33	(22)
2017–2018	Sanremo	34	(23)
2018	Modena	8	(1)
2018–2019	Rezzato	19	(7)
2019–2020	Adriese	23	(7)
2020–2021	PDHAE	24	(12)
2023–2025	Macomerese		

International career
2003–2004	Italy U-18	2	(0)
- * Club domestic league appearances and goals as of 20:21, 22 December 2024 (UTC)

Fabio Lauria (born 30 August 1986) is an Italian footballer who plays for Usinese.

== Biography ==
Born in Naples, Campania, Lauria started his career at Umbria team Ternana. In mid-2004 he was sold to Reggiana in co-ownership deal. In June 2005 Reggiana bought him outright by submitted the highest bid to Lega Calcio after no agreement could be formed between the two clubs. However, in August 2005 he was sold to Serie B team Arezzo. He then spent two seasons on loan to Serie C1 teams Martina and Lanciano despite Arezzo relegated in 2007.

In 2008–09 season he played 18 league games for Arezzo. After that season he left for Lumezzane in one-year deal. On 24 July 2010 he signed a new one-year deal. He received a call-up to Lumezzane pre-season camp in 2011 but in August terminated his contract. In August 2011, Lauria signed a contract with the FBC Unione Venezia, and is one of the most influential players of the team.
