= ASD Cassino Calcio 1924 =

Italian football club

Cassino
- Full name: A.S.D. Cassino Calcio 1924
- Nickname: azzurri (blues)
Founded
1924
2010	(re-founded)
- Ground: Stadio Gino Salveti
- Capacity: 3,700
- Chairman: Nicandro Rossi
- Manager: Imperio Carcione
- League: Serie D, Group G
- 2020–21: 11th
Home colours	Away colours

Associazione Sportiva Dilettantistica Cassino Calcio 1924 is an Italian association football club from Cassino, Lazio. It currently plays in Serie D.

The club was re-founded in 2010 as A.S.D. Nuova Cassino Calcio 1924 after S.S. Cassino 1927 S.r.l. went bankrupted. The club renamed to the current denomination in 2014.

The club had briefly played in Serie C2 (Lega Pro Seconda Divisione), the Italian fourth division of the professional league. The league was abolished in 2014. Serie D, the current level which Cassino is participating, since 2014 is the fourth highest level of Italian football leagues, but as the top division of non-professional (amateur) football.

== History ==
The crest of S.S. Cassino 1927

=== Foundation ===
The club was founded in 1924 and has played and won Serie D Group G in 2005–06 Serie D season; therefore, Cassino would play 2006–07 season in Serie C2 until 2009–10 Lega Pro Seconda Divisione.

The club also renamed from S.S. Cassino 1927 to S.S. Cassino 1927 S.r.l. in 2006–07 season.

In July 2010, due to the club did not fulfil the financial requirement, the club was expelled from the professional league.

=== Refoundation ===
A phoenix club was formed to represent the town as A.S.D. Nuova Cassino Calcio 1924 in 2010. The club was admitted to Promozione Lazio thanks to the article 52 of N.O.I.F.

In 2013–14 season the team finally secured promotion to Eccellenza Lazio, the top level of Lazio regional football league.

In mid-2014 the club redefined its name, simply by removing the prefix "New" (Italian: Nuova). The club also merged with A.C. Montecassino, a minor team of the city at the same time. The club was granted a new registration number 940,720.

== Honours ==
- Coppa Italia Dilettanti
  - Winners: 1985–86
