= Luca Nizzetto =

Italian footballer

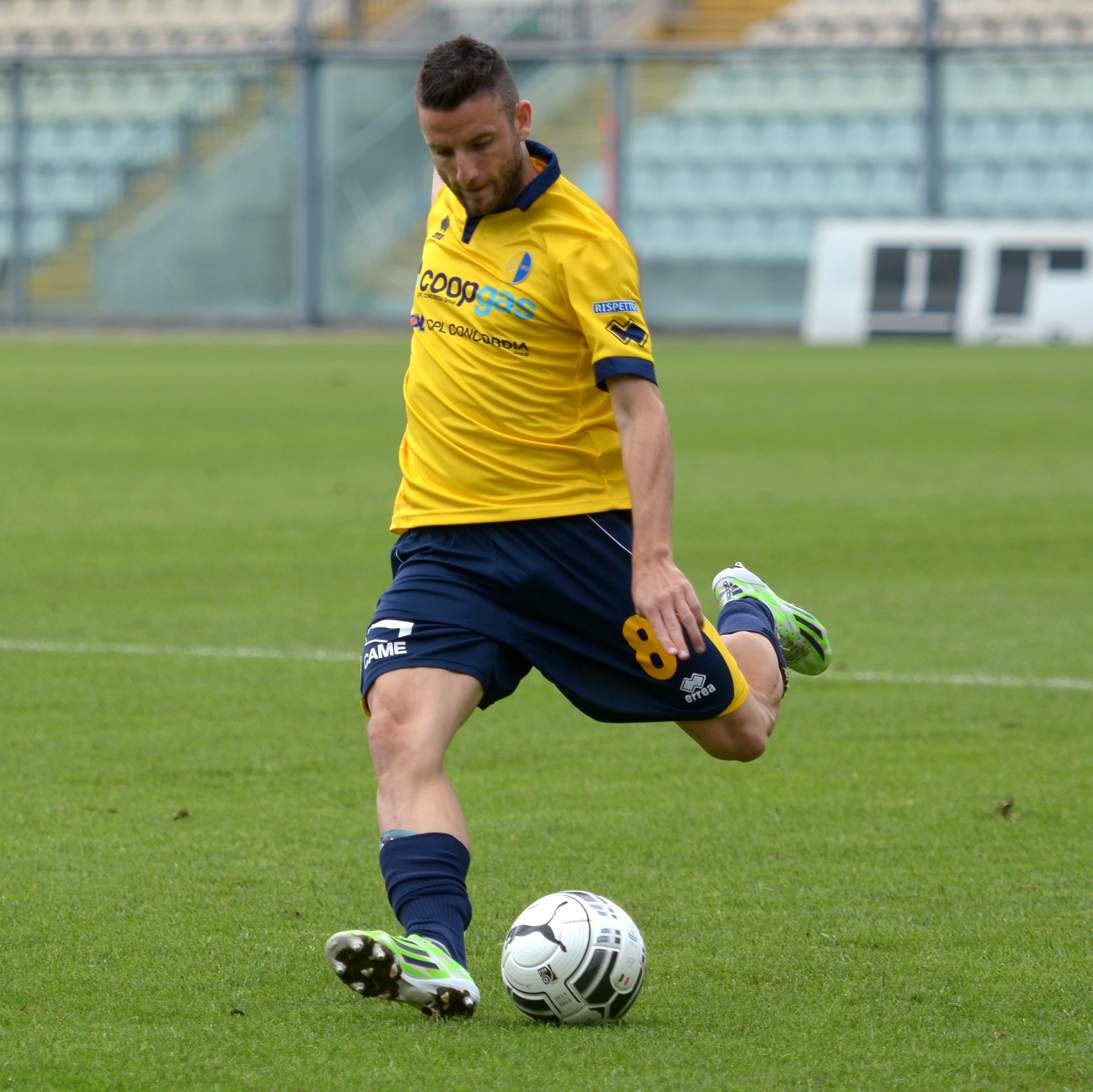

Personal information
- Date of birth: 8 March 1986 (age 40)
- Place of birth: Verona, Italy
- Height: 1.70 m (5 ft 7 in)
- Position: Midfielder

Team information
- Current team: Vigasio

Senior career*
Years	Team	Apps	(Gls)
2006–2007	Castelnuovo	31	(3)
2007–2008	Mezzocorona	30	(8)
2008–2009	Legnano	26	(7)
2009–2013	Cremonese	117	(10)
2013–2014	Trapani	39	(4)
2014–2015	Modena	37	(0)
2015–2017	Trapani	58	(3)
2017–2021	Virtus Entella	75	(5)
2021–	Vigasio		
- * Club domestic league appearances and goals as of 10 May 2021

Luca Nizzetto (born 8 March 1986) is an Italian footballer who plays as a midfielder for an amateur side Vigasio.
