= Nicholas Guidi =

Italian footballer

Personal information
- Date of birth: 25 July 1983 (age 43)
- Place of birth: Viareggio, Italy
- Height: 1.88 m (6 ft 2 in)
- Position: Centre back

Senior career*
Years	Team	Apps	(Gls)
2002–2004	Cuiopelli	57	(3)
2004–2008	Lucchese	96	(4)
2008–2013	Frosinone	113	(2)
2013–2014	Cosenza	32	(0)
2014–2015	Forlì	17	(0)
2015	Arezzo	13	(1)
2015–2018	Viareggio 2014	85	(11)
2018–2021	Real Forte	80	(15)
Total		493	(36)
- * Club domestic league appearances and goals

Nicholas Guidi (born 25 June 1983) is an Italian former footballer who plays as a centre back.

== Club career ==
After 2 years of experience with Cuiopelli, Guidi was bought by A.S. Lucchese Libertas 1905 and he played for them for 4 years in Serie C1. In 2008, he passed to Frosinone in Serie B, following the coach Piero Braglia. In this season he was confirmed by the current coach Francesco Moriero.

In 2009-10 season, he was an emergency right back for the team in mid-season, due to the injury of Lorenzo Del Prete. He then lost his place to Daniel Semenzato but in round 23 replaced injured Domenico Maietta as central back.
