= FC Real Città di Vico Equense =

Italian football club

Vico Equense
- Full name: Football Club Real Città di Vico Equense
- Founded: 1958; 68 years ago as, ASD Vico Equense 1958; 2015; 11 years ago as, F.C. Real Città di Vico Equense
- Ground: Stadio Comunale di Massaquano, Vico Equense, Italy
- Capacity: 1,500
- Manager: Gabriele Di Martino
- League: Prima Categoria
- 2013–14: Serie D/H, 13th (relegated after play-off)
Home colours	Away colours

F.C. Real Città di Vico Equense is an Italian association football club located in Vico Equense, Campania. Currently it plays in Prima Categoria.

== History ==
The club was founded in 1929 and refounded in 1958.

It was promoted to Serie D from Eccellenza (sixth tier) in 2007–08, and finished its first Serie D campaign with a second place in the Girone I, behind Siracusa. The club then enjoyed a very successful campaign in the subsequent playoff phase, ending as runners-up behind Nocerina and being subsequently picked to fill a vacancy in the fully professional Lega Pro Seconda Divisione.

The club also competed in the 2009–10 Coppa Italia as Serie D playoff runners-up, and surprisingly defeated Lega Pro Prima Divisione side Rimini (who were relegated from Serie B only one month earlier) in a 2–1 away win. Vico Equense were then defeated in the second round to Serie B outfit Lecce in a 4–0 win for the opposite side.

In summer 2010 after the relegation from Lega Pro Seconda Divisione it does not join 2010–11 Serie D and restarted from Prima Categoria Campania getting the immediate promotion to Promozione Campania. In the next season it was admitted to Eccellenza Campania after repechage.

In 2012–13 season the team won promotion to Serie D after finishing first in Eccellenza Campania Girone B. Later, it was expelled by federal's council's decision from Serie D. In the summer 2013 the club bought Real Hyria Nola's sports title and ultimately will play in the next Serie D championship as F.C. Real Città di Vico Equense.

== Colors and badge ==
The team's colors are blue, gold and white.
