= Vincenzo Bianchini =

Italian painter

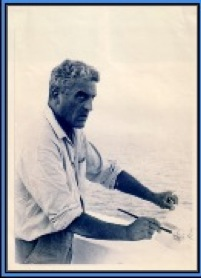

Vincenzo Bianchini (Viterbo, 1903 – Geneva, 2000) was a doctor, painter, sculptor, writer, poet, and philosopher.

== Life ==
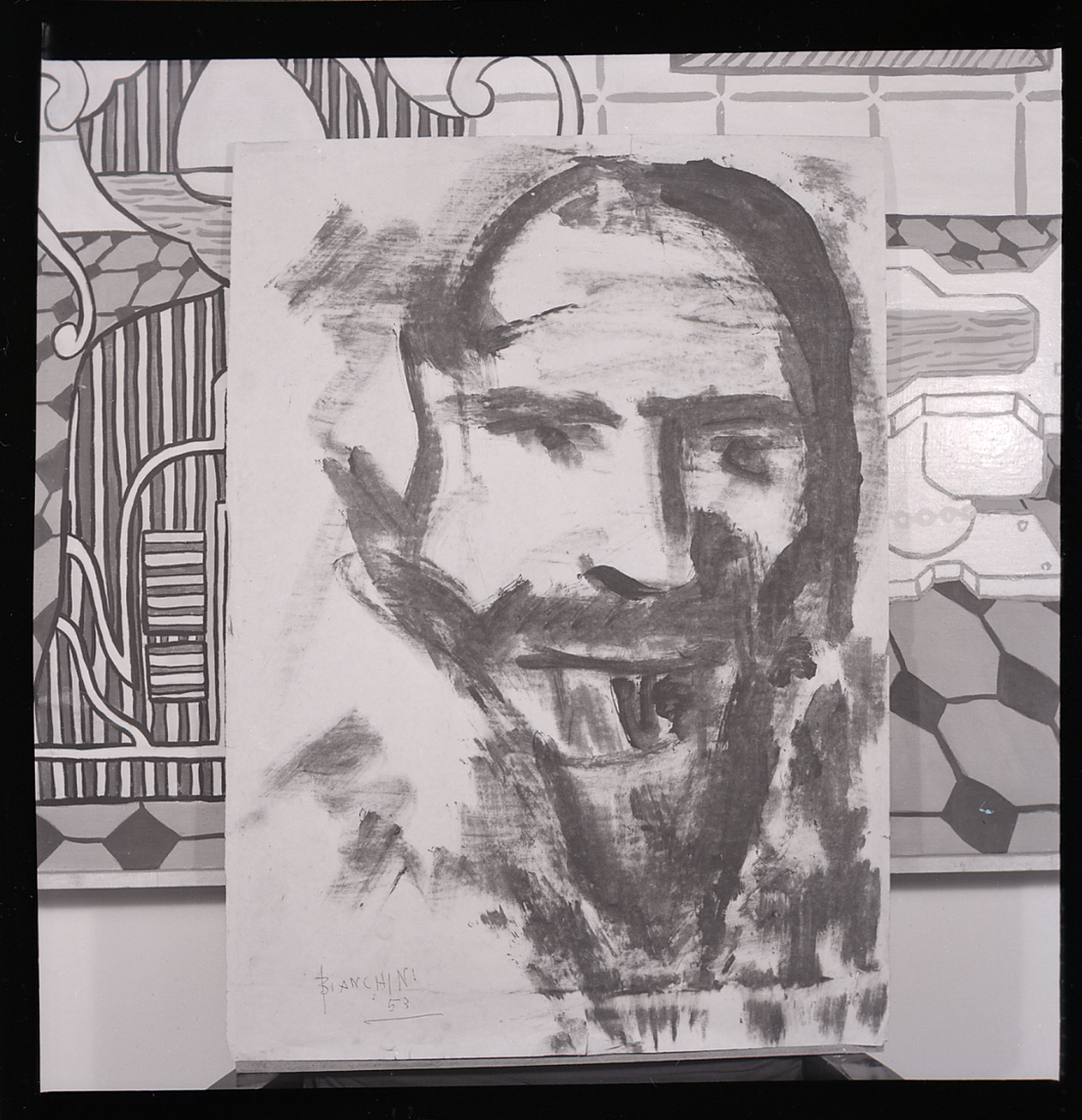
Iran, 1953. Photo by Paolo Monti (Fondo Paolo Monti, BEIC).

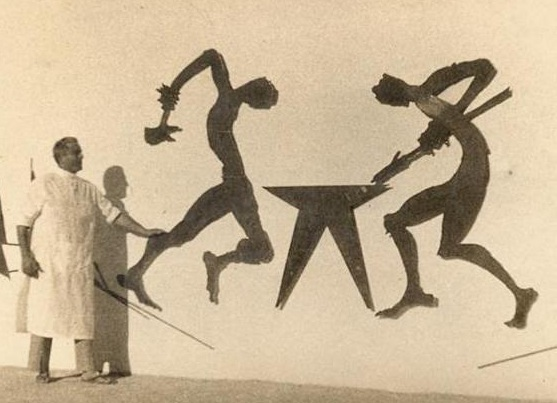
Sculpture by Bianchini — Algeria, 1960s

After studying classics and music at Viterbo, he enrolled in the faculty of political sciences at Florence, shortly before moving to Rome to study medicine.

Married, graduated, he entered military service but went to the Ethiopian War as a doctor, seeking to experience life to the fullest.

On his return he was a doctor in the municipality of Rome, in Fiumicino and the Caffarelletta quarter, where he had his first contact with the desolation and misery of the poor, prompting his first participation in anti-fascist Resistance (with his brother-in-law, the resistance leader Mariano Buratti). Later he worked in the mines of Ingurtosu in Sardinia.

In 1951 he left for Iran, to participate in an Italian aid project for the Persian population. For more than ten years, he dedicated himself to assisting villagers in the most isolated regions, organizing among other things a small hospital in Kurdistan and services at Sericiabad, where he lived for two years.

On the behest of the WHO he went to the Congo after the civil war of 1961, staying there till 1965–66. In 1966 he travelled to Algeria but returned to Iran where he continued practising and painting until the Revolution of 1979.

=== As artist ===
A Renaissance man and avant-gardiste, through multiple outlets of expression throughout his life and above all through his dedicated work with "forgotten" peoples, he has sought to valorise and make known their humanity, suffering and dignity. He has expressed his thoughts through sculpture, ceramics, and paintings as well as through poetry and novels. Some of his sculptures can be seen in buildings in Tehran and in Algeria.

=== As writer ===
He has published numerous books (poetry and prose) in Italian and English, most of them out of print:

- Battalion Doctor, (Medico di Battaglione) (novel, 1939 - Prize, Italian Academy)
- Waters of the Devil (Acqua dei Diavolo) (novel, 1964)
- Stones of Arande (Pietre di Arande) (poetry, 1972)
- Deserts of the Brado (Deserti al Brado) (poetry, 1972)

In manuscript:

- Deserted City (Città deserta)
- The Man and his House (L'uomo e la sua casa)
- Onomatopeica of the sweat (Onomatopeica dei sudore)
- The Congo of the apocalypse (Congo dell'apocalisse)
- Ecstasy (Estasi) (novel)

He wrote for many newspapers in Italy and abroad.

=== Exhibitions ===
Collective:

- Rome - Palazzo delle Arti (1938)
- Rome - Palazzo delle Esposizioni (1942)
- Tehran - International Festival (1965)
- Tehran - International Festival (1970)
- Paris - Festival of Humanity (1971)

Personal:

- Tehran - Franco-Iraniano Institute (1955)
- Paris - Gallery Quentin Bochard (1956)
- Paris - Duncan Gallery (1956)
- Rome - Gallery Marguttiana (1958)
- Milan - Montenapoleone Gallery (1958)
- Viterbo - Santoro Palace (1958)
- Tehran - University: Faculty of Architecture (1958)
- Florence - Gallery "Il Numero" (1959)
- Tehran - Italian Institute of Culture (1960)
- London - Christ Church Hall (1961)
- Coquilathville (Congo) - Atheneum (1963)
- Bari - Circle La Vela (1965)
- Shiraz - University (1967)
- Abadan - Salon of the Annexe (1969) (Arranged by Fereydoun Motamed)
- Tehran - University Faculty of the Fine Arts (1971)
- Algiers - National Library (1971)
- Milan - Circle De Amicis (1973)
- Milan - Center of European Art (1974)
- Los Angeles - Ait Center Azari (1982)

Small exhibitions in:

- Brindisi, Taranto, Lecce and Grottamare

=== Paintings ===
- 1960 Libenge Congo
