= Nicolas Corcione =

Nicolas Corcione (born 1969) is, since 2013, the president of the Grupo Corcione Foundation, a non-profit organization that focuses on helping children and youth in situations of social vulnerability, through the pillars of education, sports, environmental protection and social contribution.

Corcione received his Master in Construction Project Management and his B.S. in Civil Engineering from the Worcester Polytechnic Institute (WPI). Nicolas is a member of the Panama Canal Authority Board of Directors, the WPI's Advisory Board and a Chairman of the Board at Grupo Corcione.

Corcione is a member and director of the Chamber of Commerce since 2005, Green Building Council Panama Chapter, ACOBIR-NAR Panama. EO Organization since 2005.
