= Francesco Battaglia (footballer) =

Italian footballer (born 1985)

Personal information
- Date of birth: 26 April 1985 (age 41)
- Place of birth: Castellamonte, Italy
- Height: 1.86 m (6 ft 1 in)
- Position: Defender

Youth career
- Torino

Senior career*
Years	Team	Apps	(Gls)
2005–2007	Pavia	18	(0)
2007	Chievo	0	(0)
2007–2009	Legnano	33	(0)
2009	Eupen	11	(0)
2009–2010	Cittadella	3	(0)
2010–2011	SPAL	27	(1)
2011–2012	Pro Vercelli	2	(0)
2012–2013	Venezia	20	(0)
2014	Castiglione	10	(2)

International career
2001	Italy U16	7	(0)
2001	Italy U17	2	(0)
2003	Italy U18	1	(0)
2004	Italy U19	8	(0)
2004–2005	Italy U20	10	(0)
2005–2006	Italy U20 "C"	3	(0)
- * Club domestic league appearances and goals as of end of 13–14 season

Francesco Battaglia (born 26 April 1985) is an Italian footballer.

== Biography ==
Born in Castellamonte, the Province of Turin (Italian: Torino), Piedmont, Battaglia was a trainee of Torino Calcio. Battaglia was in the reserve team of Torino from 2003 to 2005, and also played for the reserve B in 2004–05 season. After the newly promoted Serie A club bankrupted at the start of 2005–06 Serie A and a new company was admitted to Serie B, Battaglia decided to leave as a free agent and was signed by Pavia. The under-20 internationals immediately made his professional debut in the first season in the third division. He suspended once due to fourth caution in just 18 games. In July 2006 he was signed by Chievo in co-ownership deal (Chievo acquired Battaglia outright for undisclosed fee and sold him back to Pavia in co-own for €500). in January 2007 Chievo acquired him outright for an undisclosed fee.

On 31 August 2007 Battaglia left for Legnano, a third division (Serie C1) club. Just 17 appearances he booked 5 times. At the end of season he was linked to various clubs, including Chievo. Battaglia earned an absolute starting place in 2008–09 Lega Pro Prima Divisione, with 16 games in half season. However, he was also sent off twice (one direct and one due to second caution) and sixth caution including the aforementioned . In January 2009 he left for Belgian Second Division club Eupen. Eupen almost relegated as the 14th and Battaglia played 11 times and just 2 caution.

On 27 July 2009 Battaglia returned to Italy for Serie B club Cittadella. However, he just played 3 times.

Battaglia once again returned to the Italian third division in 2010–11 Lega Pro Prima Divisione for SPAL, with Rachid Arma moved to opposite direction. Battaglia played full season with 27 games, but also sent off twice (due to second caution and direct sent off) and 6 caution (including the second caution before sent off).

Battaglia was signed by Pro Vercelli in 2011–12 Lega Pro Prima Divisione. However, he was sent off at the start of season already in the second match of 2011–12 Coppa Italia Lega Pro, which he also booked in the first cup match. Battaglia returned to the lineup in the fourth cup match. Battaglia failed to play regularly and only played twice in the league, after the emerge of Alberto Masi and Angelo Bencivenga.

On 16 August 2012 Battaglia was released by the Serie B newcomer and joined fourth division club Venezia on the same day, in 2-year contract. Battaglia missed the first few rounds for Venezia due to injury. However, he did not play any game in 2013–14 Lega Pro Prima Divisione. On 27 December he was allowed to train with Castiglione until 3 January, the first day of transfer windows. At the end of season Castiglione relegated to Serie D.

=== International career ===
Battaglia capped for Italy U15 team in 2000–01 season (now equivalent to U16), one category below U16 team (now equivalent to U17). In the next season he was promoted to Italy U17 team, for the first edition of UEFA European Under-17 Football Championship. Italy failed to qualify to elite round. Battaglia only capped once for U18 team in 2002–03 season. He returned to national youth team in April and played all 3 games in 2004 UEFA European Under-19 Football Championship elite qualification as well as all 3 group stage matches of final tournament. Italy still qualified to 2005 FIFA World Youth Championship despite finished as the equal fifth. Battaglia spent the whole 2004–05 season with U20 team in friendlies and made 2 starts, 2 substitutes in the World Youth Cup in June 2005. Battaglia was selected once to 2005–06 U20 Four Nations Tournament. However, he failed to receive more call-up from U20 nor U21 and instead played for Italy U20 "C", the youth representatives from Serie C only.
