= Massimiliano Pesenti =

Italian footballer

Personal information
- Date of birth: 13 April 1987 (age 39)
- Place of birth: Treviglio, Italy
- Height: 1.80 m (5 ft 11 in)
- Position: Forward

Team information
- Current team: Trevigliese
- Number: 9

Youth career
- –2007: AlbinoLeffe

Senior career*
Years	Team	Apps	(Gls)
2007–2015	AlbinoLeffe	74	(21)
2007	→ Prato (loan)	12	(3)
2007–2008	→ Canavese (loan)	26	(10)
2008–2010	→ Lumezzane (loan)	35	(8)
2011–2012	→ Prato (loan)	13	(0)
2015–2016	Reggiana	8	(0)
2016	AlbinoLeffe	7	(2)
2016–2017	Pro Piacenza	34	(15)
2017–2018	Pontedera	21	(11)
2018–2019	Piacenza	37	(15)
2019	Pisa	24	(5)
2019–2020	Padova	11	(2)
2020–2021	Arezzo	12	(1)
2022	Pro Patria	10	(1)
2022–2023	Sant'Angelo	22	(3)
2023–2024	Atletico Castegnato	28	(8)
2024-	Trevigliese	28	(12)
- * Club domestic league appearances and goals as of 17 September 2023

Massimiliano Pesenti (born 13 April 1987) is an Italian footballer who plays as a forward for Serie D club Trevigliese

== Career ==
Born in Treviglio, the Province of Bergamo, Pesenti started his career at AlbinoLeffe. In January 2007 he left for Serie C2 side Prato. On 1 July 2007 he returned to the Province of Bergamo and awarded no.19 shirt of the first team. But loaned to Serie C2 side Canavese in August 2007. In the 2008–09 season, he was initially call-up to AlbinoLeffe's pre-season summer training camp, and awarded no.99 shirt, but left for Lega Pro Prima Divisione (ex-Serie C1) side Lumezzane in August 2008. and his loan was extended in July 2009.

In 2010–11 season he changed his shirt number to no.54.

In summer 2011 Pesenti was signed by Prato. In summer 2015 he finally left the club after a relegation to Serie D.

On 15 July 2015 he was signed by Reggiana.

On 14 January 2019 he signed with Pisa.

On 2 September 2019 he signed with Padova.

On 2 October 2020 he moved to Arezzo.

On 31 January 2022, Pesenti joined Pro Patria.
