= Papa Dadson =

Ghanaian footballer

Personal information
- Full name: Papa Dadson Ekow
- Date of birth: 18 March 1990 (age 36)
- Place of birth: Takoradi, Ghana
- Height: 1.75 m (5 ft 9 in)
- Position: Midfielder

Team information
- Current team: Lumezzane

Youth career
- Lumezzane

Senior career*
Years	Team	Apps	(Gls)
2008–2009	Lumezzane	1	(0)
2009–2010	Darfo Boario	28	(3)
2010–2013	Lumezzane	71	(0)
2016–2017	AC Rezzato	13	(0)
2017	Trento	18	(3)
2018–2019	Darfo Boario	27	(0)
2019–	Lumezzane		
- * Club domestic league appearances and goals as of 19:22, 17 December 2019 (UTC)

Papa Dadson Ekow (born 18 March 1990) is a Ghanaian footballer who plays in Italy for A.C. Lumezzane.

== Club career ==
Ahead of the 2019–20 season, Dadson returned to A.C. Lumezzane for the third time.
