= Boryń =

Boryń refers to the following places in Poland:

- Boryń, Lubusz Voivodeship
- Boryń, Pomeranian Voivodeship
