= Raffaele Rubino =

Italian footballer and sporting director

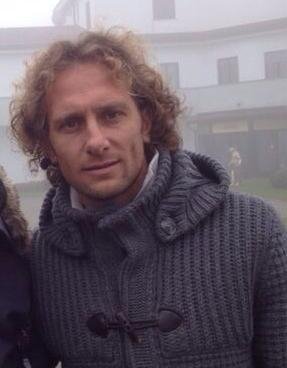

Personal information
- Date of birth: 9 January 1978 (age 48)
- Place of birth: Bari, Italy
- Height: 1.82 m (5 ft 11 1/2 in)
- Position: Forward

Youth career
- 1994–1995: Bari

Senior career*
Years	Team	Apps	(Gls)
1995–1999	Bisceglie	62	(15)
1999–2000	Brescello	7	(1)
2000–2001	Pro Sesto	42	(8)
2001–2003	Novara	34	(16)
2002–2003	→ Siena (loan)	28	(7)
2003–2004	Siena	5	(0)
2004	→ Torino (loan)	19	(4)
2004–2006	Novara	48	(18)
2005	→ Salernitana (loan)	18	(3)
2006–2007	Perugia	31	(10)
2007–2014	Novara	181	(52)
2014–2015	Prato	30	(7)
- * Club domestic league appearances and goals

Raffaele Rubino (born 9 January 1978) is an Italian former footballer and sporting director.

== Playing career ==
Rubino started his career at Bari. He then played for Bisceglie of Serie C2, which also location within the province of Bari. He played 3 Serie C2 seasons, and followed the team played at Serie D. In mid-1999, he joined Brescello of Serie C1.

In January 2000, he left for Pro Sesto of Serie C2. In summer 2001, he left for Novara of Serie C2, which he scored 16 league goals. He was spotted by Serie B club Siena, which he was signed in co-ownership deal after a successful loan with the Serie B champion. He just played 5 league matches before left on loan to Torino of Serie B. He was bought back in June 2004 by Novara, but in January 2005 he left again for Salernitana of Serie B. After another season with Novara, he signed a reported 2-year contract with Perugia of Serie C1.

In summer 2007 he re-joined Novara. After the club relegated from Serie A, he signed a new 2-year contract with Novara.

== Post-playing career ==
After retiring in 2015, Rubino was hired as a scout for his former club S.S.C. Bari. He left the position in August 2016 to join S.S.D. Palermo at the club's new chefscout under sporting director Daniele Faggiano. In January 2017, he moved to Parma Calcio alongside Faggiano and worked in a similar role.

In August 2018 he was unveiled as new director of football of Serie C club Trapani. He was removed from his role on 1 May 2019 after disagreements with the new ownership of Maurizio De Simone.

Following Trapani's promotion to Serie B by the end of the season and another change of ownership, on 8 July 2019 Rubino was re-hired as director of football of the Granata. He was released on 20 October 2019.

== Honours ==
- Serie B: 2003
