= Francesco Favasuli =

Italian football midfielder

Personal information
- Date of birth: 24 August 1983 (age 43)
- Place of birth: Locri, Italy
- Height: 1.81 m (5 ft 11 in)
- Position: Midfielder

Senior career*
Years	Team	Apps	(Gls)
2001–2002	Reggina		
2001–2002	→ Locri (loan)	25	(3)
2002	Messina	0	(0)
2002–2004	Ascoli	17	(1)
2004–2007	Teramo	77	(4)
2007–2008	Martina	18	(5)
2008–2010	Cavese	43	(7)
2010–2014	Pisa	108	(20)
2014–2015	Salernitana	35	(3)
2015–2016	Juve Stabia	24	(2)
2016–2017	Vibonese	23	(0)
2017–2021	Cavese	75	(3)
- * Club domestic league appearances and goals as of 2 May 2021

Francesco Favasuli (born 24 August 1983) is an Italian football midfielder.

== Appearances on Italian Series ==
Serie B : 17 Apps, 1 Goal

Serie C1 : 138 Apps, 16 Goals

Serie D : 25 Apps, 3 Goals

Total : 180 Apps, 20 Goals
