= Imperio Carcione =

Italian footballer

Personal information
- Date of birth: 4 March 1982 (age 44)
- Place of birth: Cassino, Lazio, Italy
- Height: 1.78 m (5 ft 10 in)
- Position: Midfielder

Senior career*
Years	Team	Apps	(Gls)
2006–2008	Cassino	56	(15)
2008	Salernitana	4	(0)
2009–2010	Benevento	14	(1)
2010	→ Brindisi (loan)	9	(1)
2011–2014	L'Aquila	74	(9)
2014	Perugia	6	(0)
2014–2015	Arezzo	25	(0)
2015–2016	Paganese	30	(5)
2016–2017	Catanzaro	20	(3)
2017	Paganese	14	(0)
- * Club domestic league appearances and goals as of 28 October 2017

Imperio Carcione (born 4 March 1982) is an Italian footballer who most recently played for Paganese in Serie C.
