= Davide Borin =

Italian footballer (born 1989)

Personal information
- Date of birth: 8 January 1989 (age 37)
- Place of birth: Turin, Italy
- Height: 1.82 m (6 ft 0 in)
- Position: Defender

Team information
- Current team: Pro Belvedere Vercelli

Youth career
- Juventus

Senior career*
Years	Team	Apps	(Gls)
2008–	Juventus	0	(0)
2008–	→ Pro Belvedere Vercelli (loan)	41	(1)
- * Club domestic league appearances and goals as of 13:45, 7 May 2010 (UTC)

Davide Borin (born 8 January 1989) is an Italian professional football player currently playing for Lega Pro Seconda Divisione team A.S. Pro Belvedere Vercelli on loan from Juventus FC

== Career ==
=== Juventus ===
Borin began his footballing career with Serie A giants Juventus FC. He was promoted from the club's youth system in 2008, and was loaned out to A.S. Pro Belvedere Vercelli in July 2008, on a two-season loan deal. In his two seasons with the Lega Pro club, Borin has made 41 total appearances with 1 goal to his credit. He is set to return to Juventus in June 2010.
