= AC Sambonifacese =

Italian football club

Pro Sambonifacese 1921
- Full name: Associazione Calcio Dilettantistica Pro Sambonifacese 1921
- Nickname(s): "Rossoblu", "Sambo"
- Founded: 1921; 104 years ago
- Ground: Stadio Renzo Tizian, San Bonifacio, Italy
- Capacity: 1,500
- Chairman: Gabriele Tessari
- Manager: Salvatore Mantovani
- League: Promozione
- Website: www.prosambo.it
Home colours	Away colours

Associazione Sportiva Dilettantistica Pro Sambonifacese 1921 is an Italian association football club located in San Bonifacio, Veneto. The team currently plays in Promozione, the sixth series of the Italian football championship.

== History ==
The club was founded in 1921 as Associazione Sportiva Sambonifacese. In 1943 it was renamed to Associazione Calcio Sambonifacese.

In the 2007–08 season of Serie D, Sambonifacese finished 3rd in Girone C, qualifying for the promotional playoffs. As the playoff winner, the team won special promotion to Serie C2, now called Lega Pro Seconda Divisione, as one of the 5 top teams in the promotional playoffs.

In the 2011–12 season, it was relegated from Lega Pro Seconda Divisione/A to Serie D.

== Colors and badge ==
Its colors are red and blue.

== See also ==
- Category:AC Sambonifacese players
