= Fabio Cusaro =

Italian professional football player

Personal information
- Date of birth: November 20, 1984 (age 41)
- Place of birth: Novara, Italy
- Height: 1.78 m (5 ft 10 in)
- Position: Central defender

Team information
- Current team: Tritium

Youth career
- Novara

Senior career*
Years	Team	Apps	(Gls)
2002–2007	Novara	66	(1)
2005–2006	→ Valenzana (loan)	10	(0)
2008–	Cesena	28	(3)
2010	→ Bellaria (loan)	10	(1)
2011	→ Foligno (loan)	13	(1)
2011–2012	→ Monza (loan)	12	(1)
2012	→ Alessandria (loan)	14	(1)
2012–	→ Tritium (loan)	2	(0)
- * Club domestic league appearances and goals as of 24 September 2012

Fabio Cusaro (born 20 November 1984 in Novara) is an Italian professional football player currently playing for Tritium in Lega Pro Prima Divisione, Italian football's third tier, on loan from Serie B side, Cesena.

He joined Foligno on a six-month loan deal and will return to Cesena on 30 June 2011.
