= Riccardo Musetti =

Italian footballer (born 1983)

Personal information
- Date of birth: 24 March 1983 (age 43)
- Place of birth: Carrara, Italy
- Height: 1.79 m (5 ft 10 in)
- Position: Forward

Youth career
- 1999–2001: Sampdoria
- 2001–2002: Napoli

Senior career*
Years	Team	Apps	(Gls)
2002–2005	Martina	41	(4)
2005	Imolese	17	(3)
2005–2007	Massese	33	(11)
2006	→ CuoioCappiano (loan)	10	(1)
2007–2009	Treviso	32	(5)
2007–2008	→ Pro Sesto (loan)	33	(11)
2009–2013	Cremonese	75	(19)
2011	→ Spezia (loan)	9	(0)
2013–2014	Sorrento	28	(7)
2014	Carrarese	0	(0)
2015	San Marino	16	(6)
2015–2016	Parma	19	(7)
2016–2017	Pro Piacenza	26	(7)
2017–2018	Pro Piacenza	22	(4)
2018–2020	Campobasso	44	(10)
2020–2021	Lornano Badesse		
2021–2022	Pontremolese		
- * Club domestic league appearances and goals

Riccardo Musetti (born 24 March 1983) is a retired Italian footballer.

== Biography ==
=== Early career ===
Born in Carrara, Tuscany, Musetti started his professional career with his hometown club Carrarese. Musetti played his first league match on 16 May 1999. In June 1999 he was signed by Sampdoria along with Daniele Perrone.

In 2001, he was exchanged to Napoli in co-ownership deal along with Paolo Carbone, and Sampdoria signed Johan Michel Romeo and Roberto D'Auria. In June 2002 Napoli signed him outright.

=== Martina & Massese ===
In 2002–03 season he left for Martina and played 2 1/2 Serie C1 seasons. In January 2005 he left for Serie C2 club Imolese. In 2005, at first he left for Aglianese then signed by Chievo and farmed him to Massese in a co-ownership deal. In June 2006 Massese bought him outright.

=== Treviso ===
In June 2007, he was signed by Serie B club Treviso on a free transfer. In the first season he was loaned to Serie C1 club Pro Sesto. In 2008–09 Serie B season, he made his Serie B debut and scored 5 goals. The team finished as the bottom one and then went bankrupt.

=== Cremonese ===
In July 2009 he was signed by Lega Pro Prima Divisione club Cremonese. He scored 14 goals for the team as the team top-scorer in his maiden season, while his partners Massimo Coda and Massimiliano Guidetti scored 10 goals each. on 31 January 2011 Musetti left for Spezia.

=== As a Journeyman ===
Since 2013 he changed his employer each season. He was a player for Sorrento in 2013–14 season. In summer 2014 he moved to Romanian Liga II, but moving back to Carrarese in the same window by terminating the contract. However, the Romanian club did not file the transfer in time before the closure of Italian transfer window (on 1 September), thus Carrarese signed Antonio Di Nardo instead.

Musetti joined San Marino Calcio in January 2015. In summer 2015 he joined newly re-founded Parma for their 2015–16 Serie D season.
