= Antonio Bocchetti (footballer, born 1990) =

Italian footballer

Personal information
- Date of birth: 28 January 1990 (age 36)
- Place of birth: Naples, Italy
- Position: Defender

Youth career
- –2009: Padova
- 2008–2009: → Lecce (loan)

Senior career*
Years	Team	Apps	(Gls)
2009–2010	Juve Stabia	4	(0)
2010–2011	Casertana	21	(0)
Total		25	(0)

International career
2005–2006	Italy U16	5	(1)
- * Club domestic league appearances and goals

Antonio Bocchetti (born 28 January 1990) is an Italian former footballer who played as a defender.

== Career ==
Born in Naples, Campania, Bocchetti started his career at Veneto club Padova. Bocchetti received a call-up to the Italy U16 team during the 2005–06 season. On 1 September 2008 Bocchetti left for Lecce in temporary deal. Bocchetti was a member of their reserve team. On 10 July 2009, he was signed by Juve Stabia in co-ownership deal. In June 2010 Padova gave up the remain 50% registration rights to Juve Stabia.

In August 2010, Bocchetti left for Italian fifth division club Casertana.
