= Simone Basso =

Italian football forward

Personal information
- Date of birth: 25 July 1982 (age 44)
- Place of birth: Chiavari, Italy
- Height: 1.77 m (5 ft 9 1/2 in)
- Position: Forward

Team information
- Current team: Lavagnese
- Number: 7

Senior career*
| Years | Team | Apps | (Gls) |
| 1998–2001 | Parma | 0 | (0) |
| 2001–2002 | Livorno | 9 | (0) |
| 2002–2003 | Prato | 25 | (0) |
| 2003–2004 | Aglianese | 21 | (1) |
| 2004–2005 | Prato | 16 | (1) |
| 2005–2006 | Lavagnese 1919 | 30 | (0) |
| 2006–2007 | Sangiovannese | 33 | (4) |
| 2007–2009 | Crotone | 66 | (16) |
| 2009–2011 | Frosinone | 50 | (5) |
| 2011 | Spezia | 13 | (1) |
| 2011–2012 | Sorrento | 25 | (2) |
| 2012–2016 | Trapani | 81 | (18) |
| 2016 | Venezia | 0 | (0) |
| 2016–2017 | Modena | 31 | (3) |
| 2017– | Lavagnese | 15 | (6) |
- * Club domestic league appearances and goals as of 1 February 2018

Simone Basso (born 25 July 1982) is an Italian football forward who currently plays for Lavagnese.

He previously played for Parma F.C., Livorno Calcio, A.C. Prato, Aglianese Calcio 1923, U.S.D. Lavagnese 1919, Sangiovannese, F.C. Crotone, Frosinone Calcio, Spezia Calcio and Sorrento Calcio

== Domestic League Records ==
| Year | Competition | Apps | Goal |
|---|---|---|---|
| 1998-2001 | Serie A | 0 | 0 |
| 2009-2011 | Serie B | 50 | 5 |
| 2001-current | Serie C1 | 146 | 22 |
| 2003-2004 | Serie C2 | 21 | 1 |
| 2005-2006 | Serie D | 30 | 0 |
| Total | | 247 | 28 |
