= Andrea Ciolli =

Italian footballer (born 1989)

Personal information
- Date of birth: 20 October 1989 (age 37)
- Place of birth: Grosseto, Italy
- Height: 1.88 m (6 ft 2 in)
- Position: Centre back

Team information
- Current team: Grosseto
- Number: 5

Youth career
- Juventus

Senior career*
| Years | Team | Apps | (Gls) |
| 2007–2008 | Imperia | 14 | (2) |
| 2008 | Alessandria | 9 | (0) |
| 2008–2010 | Pro Vercelli | 34 | (0) |
| 2010–2012 | Celano | 44 | (0) |
| 2012–2015 | Asti | 87 | (10) |
| 2015– | Grosseto | 106 | (2) |

International career^{‡}
| 2015 | Italy U16 | 1 | (0) |
- * Club domestic league appearances and goals as of 22 December 2021 ‡ National team caps and goals as of 25 April 2005

Andrea Ciolli (born 20 October 1989) is an Italian professional footballer who plays as a centre back for Serie C Group B club Grosseto.

== Club career ==
In 2015, he signed for Serie D club Grosseto.

In August 2017, Ciolli briefly retired as a player because of cardiac problems.

After played a relegation on Eccellenza with the club, Ciolli returned to Serie C for the 2020–21 season. In 2020, he was named captain of the team.

== International career ==
Ciolli played a match for Italy U16 on 25 April 2005 against Slovakia.
