= Francesco Quintavalla =

Italian footballer

Personal information
- Date of birth: June 26, 1982 (age 44)
- Place of birth: Carpi, Italy
- Height: 1.80 m (5 ft 11 in)
- Position: Midfielder

Team information
- Current team: Savona

Youth career
- Carpi

Senior career*
Years	Team	Apps	(Gls)
1999–2000	Carpi	14	(0)
2000–2001	Bologna	1	(0)
2001–2002	Chievo	0	(0)
2002–2003	Poggese	19	(8)
2003–2008	Lumezzane	115	(2)
2008–2010	SPAL	49	(1)
2010–2011	Entella	15	(0)
2011–	Savona	39	(2)
- * Club domestic league appearances and goals

Francesco Quintavalla (born 26 June 1982) is an Italian former professional footballer who played for Savona.

He played one game in the Serie A in the 2000/01 season for Bologna F.C. 1909.
