= Aniello Panariello =

Italian footballer (born 1988)

Personal information
- Date of birth: 8 October 1988 (age 38)
- Place of birth: Torre del Greco, Italy
- Height: 1.84 m (6 ft 0 in)
- Position: Centre back

Team information
- Current team: Campiglia 1990

Youth career
- –2008: Empoli

Senior career*
Years	Team	Apps	(Gls)
2008–2009	Giacomense	31	(0)
2009–2011	Pergocrema	24	(0)
2009–2010	→ Viareggio (loan)	15	(0)
2011–2012	Virtus Castelfranco	0	(0)
2012–2013	Poggibonsi	0	(0)
2013–2014	Paganese	24	(3)
2014–2016	Arezzo	59	(3)
2016–2018	Robur Siena	46	(0)
2018–2019	Trento	28	(1)
2019	Aglianese		
2019–2020	Paganese	25	(2)
2020–2021	Lucchese	22	(1)
2023–2024	Lornano Badesse Calcio		
2024–	Campiglia 1990		
- * Club domestic league appearances and goals as of 8 October 2026

Aniello Panariello (born 8 October 1988) is an Italian footballer who plays as a centre-back for Campiglia 1990.

== Biography ==
Born in Torre del Greco, the Province of Naples, Panariello started his career at Empoli F.C. Since 2008–09 season he was farmed to Lega Pro clubs in co-ownership deal. In June 2009 he was signed by Pergocrema. but in August loaned to fellow Prima Divisione team Viareggio. On 1 July 2010 he returned to Pergocrema, played 22 times in the league and two more in relegation play-outs, partnering Luca Ricci.

On 1 September 2019, he returned to Paganese.

On 13 August 2020 he signed a 2-year contract with Lucchese.
