= Lorenzo Bianchini =

Italian footballer

Personal information
- Date of birth: January 17, 1989 (age 37)
- Height: 1.87 m (6 ft 2 in)
- Position: Striker

Team information
- Current team: Isola Liri

Youth career
- 2006–2009: Roma

Senior career*
Years	Team	Apps	(Gls)
2008–2009	Roma	0	(0)
2008–2009	→ Pistoiese (loan)	4	(0)
2009–	Isola Liri	19	(3)

International career
2005	Italy U-17	2	(0)
2006	Italy U-19	2	(1)
2006	Italy U-18	4	(0)
- * Club domestic league appearances and goals

Lorenzo Bianchini (born January 17, 1989) is an Italian professional football player who currently plays for A.C. Isola Liri.
