= Alberto Artuso =

Italian footballer (born 1989)

Personal information
- Date of birth: 10 May 1989 (age 37)
- Height: 1.78 m (5 ft 10 in)
- Position: Defender

Team information
- Current team: Südtirol

Youth career
- Chievo

Senior career*
Years	Team	Apps	(Gls)
2009–2010	Südtirol	15	(0)
2010–	Chievo	0	(0)
- * Club domestic league appearances and goals as of 20:01, 10 May 2010 (UTC)

Alberto Artuso (born 10 May 1989) is an Italian footballer currently playing for Chievo.
