= Romano Tozzi Borsoi =

Italian footballer

Personal information
- Date of birth: 16 February 1979 (age 47)
- Place of birth: Rome, Italy
- Height: 1.89 m (6 ft 2 in)
- Position: Forward

Team information
- Current team: Terni (player & technical director)

Youth career
- –1998: Udinese

Senior career*
Years	Team	Apps	(Gls)
1997–1998	Udinese	0	(0)
1998–1999	→ Battipagliese (loan)	16	(1)
1999–2000	Sanremese	24	(5)
2000–2001	Montevarchi	29	(1)
2001–2002	Savona	7	(0)
2002	Borgomanero	25	(14)
2002–2004	Pro Vercelli	56	(8)
2004–2006	Sassari Torres	50	(14)
2006–2011	Ternana	127	(44)
2011–2013	Perugia	35	(9)
2013–2015	Sambenedettese	57	(42)
2015–2016	Civitanovese	25	(12)
2016–2019	Città di Giulianova	89	(54)
2019–2021	Ferentillo Valnerina		
2021–	Terni		
- * Club domestic league appearances and goals as of 23:46, 28 January 2020 (UTC)

Romano Tozzi Borsoi (born 16 February 1979) is an Italian footballer who plays for Terni.

== Career ==
=== ASD Ferentillo-Valnerina ===
In the summer 2019, Tozzi joined ASD Ferentillo-Valnerina. He also became a part of the club's technical staff, primarily as a technical director.
