= Pietro Tripoli =

Italian footballer

Personal information
- Date of birth: 26 February 1987 (age 39)
- Place of birth: Palermo, Italy
- Height: 1.70 m (5 ft 7 in)
- Position: Winger

Team information
- Current team: Gallarate

Youth career
- –2006: Palermo

Senior career*
Years	Team	Apps	(Gls)
2006–2007	Palermo	0	(0)
2006–2007	→ Sambenedettese (loan)	11	(0)
2007–2013	Varese	116	(6)
2011–2012	→ Pro Vercelli (loan)	20	(0)
2013–2015	Parma	0	(0)
2013–2014	→ Ascoli (loan)	29	(11)
2014–2015	→ Pistoiese (loan)	18	(3)
2015–2016	Ascoli	14	(2)
2016–2017	Mantova	27	(1)
2017–2018	Cavese	24	(4)
2018–2019	Marsala	23	(3)
2019	Savona	13	(6)
2019–2020	Lavagnese	30	(3)
2020–2021	SCD Ligorna 1922		
2021–2022	Massese		
2022	Varesina calcio		
2022–2023	Stresa Vergante	22	(7)
2023–2024	Rhodense		
2024–2025	FC Ispra		
2025–	Gallarate		
- * Club domestic league appearances and goals as of 19:19, 8 October 2026 (UTC)

Pietro Tripoli (born 26 February 1987) is an Italian footballer who plays as a winger for Gallarate.

== Biography ==
=== Palermo ===
Born in Palermo, Sicily, Tripoli started his career at Sicilian club U.S. Città di Palermo. On 9 August 2006 Tripoli was signed by Serie C1 club Sambenedettese in a temporary deal.

=== Varese ===
On 6 July 2007 Tripoli was signed by Serie C2 club Varese in a temporary deal. On 18 July 2008 Varese signed Tripoli's 50% registration rights for a peppercorn of €500. The club won promotion to 2009–10 Lega Pro Prima Divisione at the end of 2008–09 season. In June 2009 the co-ownership deal was renewed. Varese finished as the runner-up of Group A of the third division, winning the promotion to Serie B. In June 2010 Palermo also gave up the remain 50% registration rights to Varese for free.

Tripoli played 27 times for Varese in 2010–11 Serie B. He spent 2011–12 Serie B season at Pro Vercelli on loan. Tripoli only managed to play 11 times for Varese in 2012–13 Serie B.

=== Parma ===
In summer 2013, Tripoli was signed by Serie A club Parma as a free agent. He was immediately loaned to Lega Pro Prima Divisione side Ascoli. On 25 July 2014 he was signed by Lega Pro club Pistoiese in a temporary deal.

=== Return to Ascoli ===
After Parma's financial problem was exposed, Tripoli was re-signed by Ascoli for an undisclosed fee, in a 1 1/2-year contract.

=== Mantova FC ===
On 7 January 2016, it was confirmed, that Tripoli had signed a contract with Lega Pro side Mantova until June 2017.

=== Marsala ===
On 25 August 2018, he joined Serie D club Marsala.

== Honours ==
- Lega Pro Seconda Divisione: 2009 (Varese)
