= Inter Milan and the Italy national football team =

This article lists the players that played for the different levels of the Italy national football teams while with Inter Milan. Players who represented Italy before or after they played for Inter are not included. The players who were called up to the squad but did not play in any matches are unlisted.

== List of call-ups of Inter Milan players to the Italy national teams ==
=== List of call-ups of Inter players to the Italy national football team ===
- Francesco Acerbi
- Daniele Adani
- Ermanno Aebi
- Amedeo Amadei
- Antonio Angelillo
- Luigi Allemandi
- Alessandro Altobelli
- Giuseppe Asti
- Dino Baggio
- Roberto Baggio
- Salvatore Bagni
- Mario Balotelli
- Nicolò Barella
- Giuseppe Baresi
- Alessandro Bastoni
- Gianfranco Bedin
- Delfo Bellini
- Mauro Bellugi
- Giuseppe Bergomi
- Fulvio Bernardini
- Nicola Berti
- Mario Bertini
- Alessandro Bianchi
- Cristiano Biraghi
- Bruno Bolchi
- Roberto Boninsegna
- Franco Bontadini
- Ivano Bordon
- Lorenzo Buffon
- Tarcisio Burgnich
- Aldo Campatelli
- Piero Campelli
- Antonio Candreva
- Fabio Cannavaro
- Armando Castellazzi
- Carlo Ceresoli
- Aldo Cevenini
- Luigi Cevenini
- Francesco Coco
- Fulvio Collovati
- Leopoldo Conti
- Mario Corso
- Danilo D'Ambrosio
- Matteo Darmian
- Marco Delvecchio
- Attilio Demaría
- Luigi Di Biagio
- Federico Dimarco
- Angelo Domenghini
- Éder
- Pio Esposito
- Giacinto Facchetti
- Riccardo Faccio
- Pietro Fanna
- Osvaldo Fattori
- Giuseppe Favalli
- Giovanni Ferrari
- Rino Ferrario
- Pietro Ferraris
- Riccardo Ferri
- Davide Fontolan
- Virgilio Fossati
- Davide Frattesi
- Angelo Franzosi
- Salvatore Fresi
- Annibale Frossi
- Roberto Gagliardini
- Giorgio Ghezzi
- Giovanni Giacomazzi
- Attilio Giovannini
- Fabio Grosso
- Aristide Guarneri
- Giovanni Invernizzi
- Spartaco Landini
- Ugo Locatelli
- Benito Lorenzi
- Saul Malatrasi
- Antonio Manicone
- Giampiero Marini
- Ernesto Mascheroni
- Marco Materazzi
- Gianfranco Matteoli
- Bruno Mazza
- Alessandro Mazzola
- Giuseppe Meazza
- Aurelio Milani
- Francesco Moriero
- Thiago Motta
- Maino Neri
- Fulvio Nesti
- Giovanni Pasquale
- Roberto Porta
- Renato Olmi
- Gabriele Oriali
- Gianluca Pagliuca
- Egisto Pandolfini
- Christian Panucci
- Giampaolo Pazzini
- Armando Picchi
- Silvio Pietroboni
- Alfredo Pitto
- Matteo Politano
- Andrea Ranocchia
- Enrico Rivolta
- Antonio Sabato
- Davide Santon
- Giuliano Sarti
- Luigi Sartor
- Stefano Sensi
- Pietro Serantoni
- Aldo Serena
- Francesco Toldo
- Nicola Ventola
- Guido Vincenzi
- Cristiano Zanetti
- Walter Zenga

=== List of call-ups of Inter players to the Italy Olympic football team ===
- Alessandro Altobelli
- Dino Baggio
- Giuseppe Baresi
- Evaristo Beccalossi
- Marco Branca
- Fulvio Collovati
- Salvatore Fresi
- Alessandro Pistone

=== List of call-ups of Inter players to the Italy under-23 football team ===
- Alessandro Pistone

=== List of call-ups of Inter players to the Italy under-21 football teams ===
- Enrico Alfonso
- Alessandro Altobelli
- Marco Andreolli
- Mario Balotelli
- Dino Baggio
- Francesco Bardi
- Giuseppe Baresi
- Alessandro Bastoni
- Nicola Beati
- Evaristo Beccalossi
- Raoul Bellanova
- Mauro Bellugi
- Giuseppe Bergomi
- Graziano Bini
- Cristiano Biraghi
- Francesco Bolzoni
- Ivano Bordon
- Luca Caldirola
- Nazzareno Canuti
- Bruno Cirillo
- Corrado Colombo
- Mirko Conte
- Lorenzo Crisetig
- Samuele Longo
- Enrico Cucchi
- Marco Delvecchio
- Marco Davide Faraoni
- Andrea Ferrari
- Matteo Ferrari
- Riccardo Ferri
- Riccardo Fissore
- Salvatore Fresi
- Fabrizio Lorieri
- Felice Natalino
- Gabriele Oriali
- Antonio Sabato
- Davide Santon
- Luigi Sartor
- Nicola Ventola
- Cristiano Zanetti
- Walter Zenga
- Gianfranco Matteoli
- Luca Mezzano
- Giovanni Pasquale
- Andrea Pirlo
- Alessandro Pistone
- Alessandro Potenza
- Stefano Rossini

=== List of call-ups of Inter players to the Italy under-20 football teams ===
- Enrico Alfonso
- Mattia Altobelli
- Marco Andreolli
- Nicola Beati
- Simone Benedetti
- Matteo Bianchetti
- Giacomo Bindi
- Francesco Bolzoni
- Leonardo Bonucci
- Simone Dell'Agnello
- Paolo Hernan Dellafiore
- Giulio Donati
- Marco Davide Faraoni
- Salvatore Ferraro
- Jacopo Fortunato
- Luca Franchini
- Matteo Lombardo
- Federico Mannini
- Alessandro Potenza
- Davide Santon
- Giuseppe Ticli
- Paolo Tornaghi

=== List of call-ups of Inter players to the Italy under-19 football teams ===
- Marco Andreolli
- Francesco Bardi
- Nicola Beati
- Simone Benedetti
- Matteo Bianchetti
- Giacomo Bindi
- Cristiano Biraghi
- Luca Caldirola
- Lorenzo Crisetig
- Simone Dell'Agnello
- Paolo Hernan Dellafiore
- Mattia Destro
- Fabio Eguelfi
- Sebastiano Esposito
- Marco Davide Faraoni
- Salvatore Ferraro
- Nicolas Giani
- Andrea Lussardi
- Federico Mannini
- Riccardo Meggiorini
- Andrea Mei
- Matteo Momente
- Luca Moscatiello
- Felice Natalino
- Devis Nossa
- Simone Pecorini
- Alessandro Potenza
- Andrea Romanò
- Giacomo Sciacca
- Daniel Semenzato
- Luca Tremolada
- Niccolò Belloni
- Marco Benassi
- Simone Pasa
- Luca Garritano

=== List of call-ups of Inter players to the Italy under-18 football teams ===
- Marco Andreolli
- Marco Benassi
- Daniel Bessa
- Giacomo Bindi
- Francesco Bolzoni
- Luca Caldirola
- Giovanni Capuano
- Lorenzo Crisetig
- Mirko Conte
- Leonardo Longo
- Alessandro Cannataro
- Lorenzo Tassi
- Sergio D'Autilia
- Simone Dell'Agnello
- Mattia Destro
- Sandro Di Duca
- Matteo Ferrari
- Marco Fossati
- Giuseppe Galliano
- Luca Garritano
- Nicolas Giani
- Roberto Gimmelli
- Natale Gonnella
- Ivan Maruzzelli
- Andrea Mei
- Matteo Momente
- Felice Natalino
- Luca Palazzo
- Lorenzo Paramatti
- Simone Pasa
- Thomas Pedrabissi
- Andrea Polizzano
- Riccardo Ramazzotti
- Michele Rigione
- Andrea Romanò
- Giacomo Sciacca
- Massimiliano Sebastiani
- Alessandro Sgrigna
- Davide Sinigaglia
- Gionatha Spinesi
- Luca Stocchi
- Giovanni Terrani
- Paolo Tornaghi
- Luca Tremolada
- Simone Veronese

=== List of call-ups of Inter players to the Italy under-17 football teams ===
- Mattia Barni
- Andrea Bavena
- Nicola Beati
- Tommaso Berni
- Francesco Bilardo
- Francesco Bolzoni
- Luca Caldirola
- Nicola Cannataro
- Moreno Capra
- Matteo Capuano
- Davide Cattaneo
- Matteo Colombi
- Lorenzo Crisetig
- Sergio D'Autilia
- Marco Dalla Costa
- Simone Dell'Agnello
- Mattia Destro
- Fabio Eguelfi
- Matteo Ferrari
- Salvatore Ferraro
- Alessandro Fioretti
- Riccardo Fochesato
- Marco Ezio Fossati
- Virgilio Fossati
- Alberto Gallinetta
- Geremy Lombardi
- Andrea Mei
- Riccardo Melgrati
- Andrea Monachello
- Davide Moreo
- Felice Natalino
- Lorenzo Paramatti
- Simone Pasa
- Simone Pecorini
- Thomas Pedrabissi
- Andrea Polizzano
- Riccardo Ramazzotti
- Michele Rigione
- Andrea Romanò
- Davide Santon
- Daniel Semenzato
- Vincenzo Sgambato
- Alessandro Sgrigna
- Giacomo Sciacca
- Paolo Tornaghi
- Carlo Raffaele Trezzi
- Marco Varaldi

=== List of call-ups of Inter players to the Italy under-16 football teams ===
- Alessandro Alessandri
- Mattia Barni
- Andrea Bavena
- Nicola Beati
- Tommaso Berni
- Luca Bonfiglio
- Francesco Bilardo
- Alessandro Businaro
- Luca Caldirola
- Alessandro Cannataro
- Moreno Capra
- Giovanni Capuano
- Davide Costa
- Lorenzo Crisetig
- Simone Dell'Agnello
- Andrea Delle Donne
- Mattia Destro
- Dennis Esposito
- Andrea Ferlino
- Salvatore Ferraro
- Riccardo Gaiola
- Alberto Gallinetta
- Natale Gonnella
- Geremy Lombardi
- Andrea Mei
- Diego Mella
- Andrea Mira
- Davide Moreo
- Matteo Momente
- Luca Moscatiello
- Marco Nichetti
- Lorenzo Paramatti
- Simone Pecorini
- Riccardo Ramazzotti
- Nicola Redomi
- Andrea Romanò
- Giacomo Sciacca
- Davide Sinigaglia
- Demetrio Steffè
- Paolo Tornaghi
- Carlo Raffaele Trezzi
- Marco Varaldi
- Edoardo Zita
- Alessio Bernardi
- Matteo Colombini
- Saulo Brambilla
- Mel Taufer

=== List of call-ups of Inter players to the Italy under-15 football teams ===
- Alessandro Alessandri
- Nicola Beati
- Tommaso Berni
- Federico Dimarco
- Luca Bretti
- Giovanni Capuano
- Alessandro Leopizzi
- Matteo Arcuri
- Riccardo Ramazzotti
- Nello Russo
- Davide Sinigaglia
- Fabio Della Giovanna
- Carlo Raffaele Trezzi
- Marco Varaldi
- Federico Bonazzoli
