= Daniele Marino =

Italian footballer (born 1988)

Personal information
- Date of birth: 25 July 1988 (age 38)
- Place of birth: Rome, Italy
- Height: 1.78 m (5 ft 10 in)
- Position: Defender

Team information
- Current team: Bisceglie
- Number: 33

Youth career
- 2004–2007: Inter
- 2007: → Pro Sesto (loan)

Senior career*
Years	Team	Apps	(Gls)
2007–2008	Inter	0	(0)
2007–2008	→ Gubbio (loan)	24	(0)
2008–2009	Sambenedettese	11	(0)
2009–2011	Melfi	43	(1)
2011–2013	Campobasso	23	(0)
2013–2014	Aprilia	24	(1)
2014–2015	Taranto	24	(2)
2015–2017	Akragas	44	(4)
2017	Fondi	16	(0)
2017–2018	Ternana	8	(0)
2018–2021	Virtus Francavilla	47	(4)
2021–	Bisceglie	6	(0)
- * Club domestic league appearances and goals as of 7 November 2021

Daniele Marino (born 25 July 1988) is an Italian footballer who plays for Serie D team Bisceglie. He plays as a centre back.

== Career ==
Born in Rome, capital of Italy, Marino had played for Internazionale's youth team since mid-2004. In January 2007 he moved to Pro Sesto along with Leonardo D'Angelo and Nicolò Pomini, rejoining numbers of Inter teammate, namely Marco Dalla Costa, Daniele Federici, Nicola Redomi and Luca Palazzo who already transferred to the club at the start of season.

In July 2007 he was loaned to another Serie C2 side Gubbio. That season he made his league debut and played 24 times.

In the next season he was sold to Lega Pro Prima Divisione (ex- Serie C1) club Sambenedettese in co-ownership deal. He only played 11 times and played as a midfielder in one of the relegation play-outs. Marino was bought back by Inter in June, for €1,000. Inter also registered a financial income of €500, as the value of Inter retained half increased from €500 to €1,000, made his full rights increased to €2,000 in account.

In July 2009 he was sold to L.P. Seconda Divisione (ex- Serie C2) team Melfi for €500 in another co-ownership deal, made Inter register a loss of €1,000, as his residual value was €2,000 and sold for €1,000 only. In June 2010 Inter gave up the remain 50% registration rights to Melfi. Marino remained in Melfi's new season and was spotted by Serie B team AlbinoLeffe in January 2011, which the club signed him in another co-ownership deal, for €500. He was immediately loaned back to Melfi. However, AlbinoLeffe gave up its 50% rights back to Melfi in June 2011, for free.

In August 2011 he was sold to Campobasso. However, he was injured in his league debut for Campobasso on 11 September. In summer 2013 Campobasso bankrupted. Marino joined another Lega Pro Seconda Divisione club Aprilia.

On 21 June 2018 Marino was signed by Francavilla after one season in serie B with Ternana.

On 20 August 2021, he signed with Serie D club Bisceglie.
