= Aiman Napoli =

Italian footballer (born 1989)

Personal information
- Date of birth: 2 July 1989 (age 37)
- Place of birth: Paderno Dugnano, Italy
- Height: 1.81 m (5 ft 11 in)
- Position: Forward

Youth career
- 1993–1995: Oratorio San Luigi
- 1995–1997: Palazzolo Milanese
- 1997–2003: Centro Schiaffino Calderara
- 2003–2007: Pro Sesto

Senior career*
Years	Team	Apps	(Gls)
2006–2007	Pro Sesto	2	(0)
2007–2012	Inter Milan	0	(0)
2007	→ Pro Sesto (loan)	0	(0)
2009–2010	→ Modena (loan)	23	(1)
2010–2011	→ Crotone (loan)	20	(2)
2011	→ Verona (loan)	2	(0)
2012	→ Prato (loan)	5	(1)
2012–2013	Prato	27	(8)
2013–2015	Pisa	52	(4)
2015–2017	Renate	44	(8)
2017–2018	Reggiana	14	(1)
2018	Delta Calcio Rovigo	7	(3)
2018–2019	Lecco	13	(0)
2019–2020	Sant'Angelo		
2020	Portogruaro		
2020–2021	ASD Piccardo Traversetolo		
2021	Prato	9	(3)
2021	Colligiana		
2021–2022	FAVL Cimini		
2023–2024	FC Cinisello		
- * Club domestic league appearances and goals as of 15 October 2026

Aiman Napoli (born 2 July 1989) is an Italian footballer who plays as a forward.

== Club career ==
=== Pro Sesto ===
Born in Paderno Dugnano, in the province of Milan, Napoli started his career at Pro Sesto of Serie C1.

=== Internazionale ===
He was signed by Internazionale Primavera in a co-ownership deal in January 2007, for a fee of about €70,000 (in part-player swap: Marco Dalla Costa and Daniele Federici), but was loaned back to Pro Sesto for the second half of the 2006–2007 season. He officially became a player of the Nerazzurri Primavera on 1 July 2007.

He made his first team debut against Reggina Calcio on 19 December 2007. That Coppa Italia match Inter beat Reggina 4–1 and Napoli replaced Hernán Crespo just 1 minute before the 4th goal by Mario Balotelli in the 86th minute. Napoli wore no.46 (of 1st team) in the 2007–08 season. The Primavera League regular season team top-scorer in both 2007–08 and 2008–09 season, Napoli was purchased outright by Inter on 30 January 2009.

In July 2009, along with Primavera team-mate Cristian Daminuţă and Enrico Alfonso, they were loaned to Serie B side Modena. He was awarded a no.11 shirt. He made 23 league appearances, started 12 times for the team which finished in mid-table.

In the 2010–11 season he left for F.C. Crotone along with Vid Belec.

=== Prato ===
In July 2011 he was sold to Serie B newcomer Juve Stabia on a co-ownership deal, joining former teammate Cristiano Biraghi. However, on 31 August he returned to Inter without any appearances with Juve Stabia. In January 2012 he joined Prato on loan in Lega Pro Prima Divisione and he scored the decisive goal in the play-off against Piacenza. In July 2012 Prato finally signed him permanently.

=== Pisa ===
In July 2013 he signed a two years contract with A.C. Pisa 1909.

=== Renate ===
In 2015 Napoli was signed by Renate.

=== Reggiana ===
On 22 August 2017 Napoli was signed by Reggiana.

=== Sant'Angelo ===
On 26 October 2019 A.C.D. Sant'Angelo 1907 confirmed, that they had signed Napoli.
