= Moscatiello =

Moscatiello is a surname. Notable people with the surname include:

- Carlo Moscatiello (1650–1739), Italian painter
- Lisa Moscatiello (born 1966), American singer
- Luca Moscatiello (born 1991), Italian footballer
