= 1739 in art =

Events from the year 1739 in art.

== Events ==
- Royal sculptor Edme Bouchardon is commissioned to design the Fontaine des Quatre-Saisons in Paris. This year also he presents the first (terracotta) model of Cupid Fashioning a Bow out of the Club of Hercules.

== Paintings ==
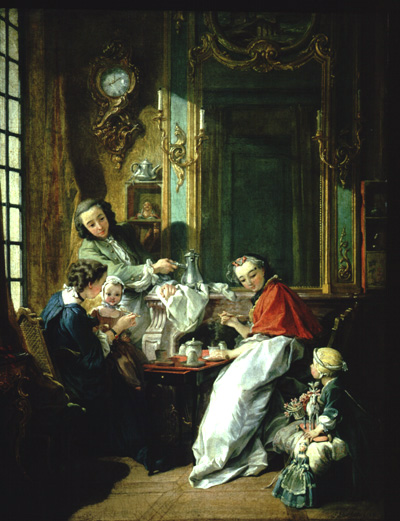
François Boucher – The Breakfast

- Francis Bindon – Portrait of Dean Jonathan Swift (for Chapter of St Patrick's Cathedral, Dublin)
- François Boucher – The Breakfast
- Joseph Parrocel – Saint Francis Regis Interceding for the Plague Victims
- Antoine Pesne – Portrait of Frederick the Great as Crown Prince
- Francesco Carlo Rusca – Portrait of Lady Mary Wortley Montagu
- Paul Troger – Apotheosis of Charles VI as Apollo (fresco for Imperial staircase ceiling at Göttweig Abbey, Austria)

== Births ==
- February 23 - Peter Adolf Hall, Swedish-French artist primarily of miniature paintings (died 1793)
- ?August – Francis Towne, English water-colour painter (died 1816)
- August 21 – Mariano Salvador Maella, Spanish painter and engraver (died 1819)
- October 3 – Valentine Green, engraver (died 1813)
- date unknown
  - Antoine Cardon, also known as Cardon the Elder, Belgian painter, portraitist and engraver (died 1822)
  - Nicolas Benjamin Delapierre, French artist (died 1800)
  - Kitao Shigemasa, Japanese ukiyo-e artist from Edo (died 1820)
  - Giuseppe Levati, Italian painter and designer of the late-Baroque and Neoclassicism period (died 1828)
- probable – Deng Shiru, Chinese calligrapher during the Qing Dynasty (died 1805)

== Deaths ==
- January 20 – Francesco Galli Bibiena, Italian architect/designer/painter (born 1659)
- March 31 – Magnus Berg, Norwegian painter, woodcarver, sculptor and non-fiction writer (born 1666)
- April 23 - Andrey Matveyev, Russian portraitist (born 1702)
- April 27 – Pierre Imbert Drevet, French portrait engraver (born 1697)
- May 10 – Cosmas Damian Asam, German Baroque painter and architect (born 1686)
- June 27 – Thomas Wedgwood III, potter (born 1685)
- July 15 – Juan Ramírez Mejandre, Spanish Baroque sculptor (born 1680)
- December 23 – John Vanderbank, English portrait painter and book illustrator (born 1694)
- date unknown
  - Charles Jervas, Irish portrait painter, translator, and art collector (born 1675)
  - Carlo Moscatiello, Italian painter of quadratura (born 1650)
