= Ivan Pedrelli =

Italian footballer

Personal information
- Date of birth: 8 April 1986 (age 40)
- Place of birth: Bologna, Italy
- Height: 5 ft 11 in (1.80 m)
- Position: Right-back

Team information
- Current team: Luparense

Youth career
- Bologna

Senior career*
| Years | Team | Apps | (Gls) |
| 2005–2006 | Bologna | 11 | (0) |
| 2006–2008 | Venezia | 3 | (0) |
| 2006–2007 | → Verona (loan) | 20 | (0) |
| 2008–2009 | Foggia | 16 | (0) |
| 2009–2013 | Benevento | 78 | (1) |
| 2013–2014 | Ischia | 13 | (0) |
| 2014–2015 | L'Aquila | 42 | (1) |
| 2015–2016 | Rimini | 30 | (2) |
| 2016–2017 | Cittadella | 18 | (0) |
| 2017–2018 | Livorno | 29 | (3) |
| 2019 | Siena | 12 | (0) |
| 2019– | Luparense | 11 | (1) |

International career
| 2006 | Italy U-20 | 1 | (0) |
- * Club domestic league appearances and goals as of 19:13, 28 February 2020 (UTC)

Ivan Pedrelli (born 8 April 1986) is an Italian professional footballer who plays as a defender for Serie D club Luparense.

== Biography ==
Born in Bologna, Pedrelli started his career at the hometown club Bologna F.C. 1909.

In mid-2006 he was signed by S.S.C. Venezia in a co-ownership deal but loaned to Verona on 31 August, from Venice. In June 2007 Venezia acquired Pedrelli outright from Bologna. He only played 3 times in 2007–08 Serie C1 for the Venice-based team. He was released at the end of season, and in November 2008 signed by Foggia and completed on 4 December. Since round 17 he was the starting defender. He agreed a new 2-year deal on 22 May 2009.

On 10 July 2009 he was transferred to Benevento Calcio and Vincenzo Sgambato loaned to Foggia in exchange. In July 2011 Pedrelli signed a new 3-year contract with the Campania-based club. Pedrelli only made 8 starts in 2012–13 Lega Pro Prima Divisione.

On 5 August 2013 Pedrelli left for fellow Campania team Ischia. The Lega Pro 2nd Division newcomer had to finish 8th or above in order to avoid relegation, due to the merger of prime and 2nd division of Lega Pro. He made 10 starts in the first half of the season (until 19 round). On 31 January 2014 Pedrelli was signed by the third division (L.P. Prime Div.) club L'Aquila, with Valerio Petrucci moved to opposite direction. From round 24 to 30 (7 games), Pedrelli made 5 starts. Andrea Scrugli returned to starting XI in round 31 with Pedrelli became a bench warmer again.

On 18 July 2015 Pedrelli was signed by Rimini on a one-year contract. On 9 June 2016 he joined Cittadella.
