= Mannini =

Mannini is an Italian surname. Notable people with the surname include:

- Daniele Mannini (born 1983), Italian footballer
- Federico Mannini (born 1992), Italian footballer
- Jacopo Antonio Mannini (1646–1752), Italian Baroque painter
- Mattia Mannini (born 2006), Italian footballer
- Moreno Mannini (born 1962), Italian footballer
