= Sciacca (surname) =

Sciacca is a surname. Notable people with the surname include:

- Con Sciacca (1947–2017), Australian politician
- Fabio Sciacca (born 1989), Italian footballer
- Gary Sciacca (born 1960), American horse trainer
- Giacomo Sciacca (born 1996), Italian footballer
- Giuseppe Sciacca (born 1955), Italian Roman Catholic official
- Paul Sciacca (1909–1986), American mobster
