= Paolo Tornaghi =

Italian footballer

Personal information
- Date of birth: 21 June 1988 (age 38)
- Place of birth: Garbagnate Milanese, Italy
- Height: 1.93 m (6 ft 4 in)
- Position: Goalkeeper

Youth career
- 1997–2008: Inter Milan

Senior career*
Years	Team	Apps	(Gls)
2008–2011	Inter Milan	0	(0)
2008–2009	→ Como (loan)	5	(0)
2009–2010	→ Rimini (co-ownership)	2	(0)
2010–2011	→ Como (loan)	1	(0)
2012–2013	Chicago Fire	9	(0)
2014–2017	Vancouver Whitecaps FC	2	(0)
2014	→ Vancouver Whitecaps FC U-23 (loan)	1	(0)
2015–2017	→ Whitecaps FC 2 (loan)	9	(0)
2018–2020	Pro Patria	41	(0)
2020–2022	Olbia	37	(0)
2022	Crotone	0	(0)

International career^{‡}
2004	Italy U16	1	(0)
2004–2005	Italy U17	3	(0)
2005	Italy U18	1	(0)
2007	Italy U20	1	(0)
- * Club domestic league appearances and goals as of 6 May 2022 ‡ National team caps and goals as of 11 August 2010

Paolo Tornaghi (born 21 June 1988) is an Italian footballer who plays as a goalkeeper.

== Club career ==
=== Youth career ===
Born in Garbagnate Milanese, the Province of Milan, Tornaghi started his career with Inter Milan. Tornaghi had played for Inter from Pulcini under-9 team in 1997–98 to Primavera. Since 2004–05 season, he was named in UEFA Champions League squad list as B list player (under-21 club youths product, while unnamed players may also eligible to play if qualified for the criteria ) along with keepers Luca Bonfiglio and Moreno Impagniatello, while the Primavera under-20 team first choice Giacomo Bindi was named in A list (25 players main squad), as Bindi was ineligible to list B. Mainly played in Berretti under-20 team (or U-18 team) (usually B team of under-20 age group), he also named for Primavera League playoffs round as understudy of Bindi.

In 2005–06 season, he was promoted to first team to train occasionally with the main squad. Tornaghi also remained at UCL B list, joined along with Berretti player Matteo Piazza. He also remained in B list in 2006–07 season and succeed Bindi as Primavera no.1 keeper, which Bindi left the club on loan. In 2007–08 season, despite remained in B list, he had to compete with Vid Belec and new signing Enrico Alfonso for the first choice.

=== Lega Pro clubs ===
In July 2008, he was loaned to Como of Lega Pro Seconda Divisione. At Como, he was the understudy of Enrico Maria Malatesta.

For the 2009–10 season, he left for Lega Pro Prima Divisione side Rimini in co-ownership deal, which worked as backup keeper for Maurizio Pugliesi. On 26 June 2010, Inter bought him back by giving a higher price in closed tender between the two clubs, for another nominal fee.

For the 2010–11 season, he returned to Como, joined along with Inter teammate Simone Fautario and Jacopo Fortunato. He made his debut on 8 August, the 2010–11 Coppa Italia first round. After played the opening match of 2010–11 Lega Pro Prima Divisione, he became the understudy of Paolo Castelli.

=== Return to Inter Milan ===
In June 2011 he went on trial to Dutch Eerste Divisie club AGOVV, under recommendation of former teammate Luca Caldirola. He left the club a few weeks later, after it was clear the club was unable to offer him a spot as first-choice keeper. Tornaghi didn't get a new club before the closure of the window. Co-currently, Inter "new" signing Emiliano Viviano was injured (who already left for Genoa in late August but forced to stay in Milan due to injury), Tornaghi became Inter Milan's fourth (or fifth counting injured Viviano) keeper in domestic competitions behind Júlio César, Luca Castellazzi and Paolo Orlandoni, and youth team player Raffaele Di Gennaro during the 2011–12 UEFA Champions League (but later replaced by Riccardo Melgrati as Di Gennaro not yet recovered; Viviano not in the list). Because Di Gennaro was eligible to List B (U-21 club youth product) but Tornaghi did not and no room for Tornaghi in 25-men main squad (list A). To become fit, Tornaghi also played for Primavera occasionally as overage player, also due to the health of Di Gennaro, Andrea Sala and immature of Melgrati and Matteo Cincilla. Tornaghi played 7 out of 12 matches in the first half of "spring" league (week four rescheduled). Due to the regulation, Tornaghi was not eligible to the European match of the "spring", the NextGen series as overage player.

=== Chicago Fire ===
Tornaghi was allowed to go to the United States for a trial in January 2012. The youth team had Di Gennaro and Sala fit again, and Tornaghi did not qualify for the playoffs in May 2012 as overage player. (player born on or before 31 December 1990 were not allowed)

Tornaghi played for Chicago Fire in pre-season friendlies, beat two other trialist and draftee Alec Kann and Carl Woszczynski as the third keeper of the team. (including 2012 Carolina Challenge Cup) (additional two for the Reserve)

On 8 March 2012, the Chicago Fire formally signed Tornaghi as an understudy to Sean Johnson and Jay Nolly, although he has become the first-choice keeper while Johnson is on national team duty with the USA U23 squad.

On 25 November 2013 Tornaghi was waived by the club and became eligible for the MLS Waiver Draft.

=== Vancouver Whitecaps FC ===
Tornaghi signed with Vancouver Whitecaps FC on 18 February 2014. He spent the whole 2014 season as backup of Danish goalkeeper David Ousted. During the 2015 season he gets his first official matches with the team playing as starter goalkeeper in three of four Canadian Championship matches against Montreal Impact and Toronto FC. On 26 August 2015 Vancouver Whitecaps FC become Canadian Champion for the first time in club history. For the first time the team is also participating to the CONCACAF Champions League tournament where Tornaghi gets four appearances.

On 5 March 2016 he re-signed with the Whitecaps. Tornaghi plays the Canadian Championship semi-final matches against Ottawa Fury FC and the first-leg final match in Toronto against his fellow Italian player Sebastian Giovinco, star of Toronto FC. The Whitecaps eventually lose the championship after the second-leg match despite the full-powered lineup that includes 2015 and 2016 All-Star goalkeeper David Ousted. Tornaghi plays two of four matches in the 2016 CONCACAF Champions League group stage where the Whitecaps gets their first historical qualification for the knock-out phase.

On 16 October 2016 Tornaghi make his first MLS appearance with the Whitecaps, recording a clean sheet in a 0–0 draw in San Jose, California against San Jose Earthquakes and was awarded Man of the Match title.

On 18 July 2017, Tornaghi and the Whitecaps mutually agreed to terminate his contract.

=== Return to Italy ===
After not playing in the 2017–18 season, he returned to Italy and joined Pro Patria, which was newly promoted to the third-tier Serie C on 14 July 2018.

On 8 September 2020, he signed a one-year contract with Olbia. He left the club at the end of the 2020–21 season. After 14 games were played in the 2021–22 Serie C season, Olbia's new first-choice goalkeeper Giuseppe Ciocci suffered a knee injury. On 19 November 2021, Tornaghi returned to Olbia for the remainder of the season. Tornaghi did not appear for Olbia after signing the new deal, Maarten van der Want served as the first-choice goalkeeper during Ciocci's injury, and on 19 January 2022, Tornaghi's contract with Olbia was terminated by mutual consent.

On 3 February 2022, Tornaghi signed with Crotone until the end of the season, with an option to extend.

== International career ==
Tornaghi had played for Italy from U16 to U20 level. He failed to play in U19 nor in U21. He received his first call-up in 2003, from Italy national under-15 football team.

Tornaghi was call-up to 2005 FIFA U-17 World Championship as understudy Enrico Alfonso, who later became Inter teammate from 2007 to 2011, including the time spent on loan. He also worked as understudy for Alfonso at 2005 UEFA European Under-17 Football Championship. After Alfonso was sent off in the 3rd match (group stage) of that tournament, he played 2 matches for Italy U17 (one at semi-final), because he suffered a head concussion during the semi-final match, on the third place match the first choice goalkeeper was Simone Santarelli.

In the 2005–06 season, he received a call-up from Italy U18 team for two friendlies against Portugal U18 team twice. He started the first match ahead Alfonso but in the second match behind Alberto Frison. He also received a call-up for U19 team's training camp in 2006–07 season.

In 2007–08 season, he played once for Italy national under-20 football team at Four Nations Tournament (2nd match) (as Alfonso joined U21 team), replaced Frison at half-time. Italy won Switzerland U20 team in 3–0.

== Personal life ==
Tornaghi received his U.S. green card in September 2013, which qualifies him as a domestic player for MLS roster purposes.

== Honours ==
=== Club ===
Vancouver Whitecaps FC

- Canadian Championship: 2015

Inter Primavera

- Torneo di Viareggio: 2008
- Campionato Nazionale Primavera: 2006–07, 2011–12; Runner-up: 2007–08
- Coppa Italia Primavera: 2006; Runner-up: 2006–07
- Supercoppa Primavera Runner-up: 2006

Inter Under-15

- Campionato Giovanissimi Nazionali: 2002–03

=== International ===
Italy U-17

- UEFA Under-17 Championship (Third place): 2005
