= Simone Benedetti =

Italian professional footballer

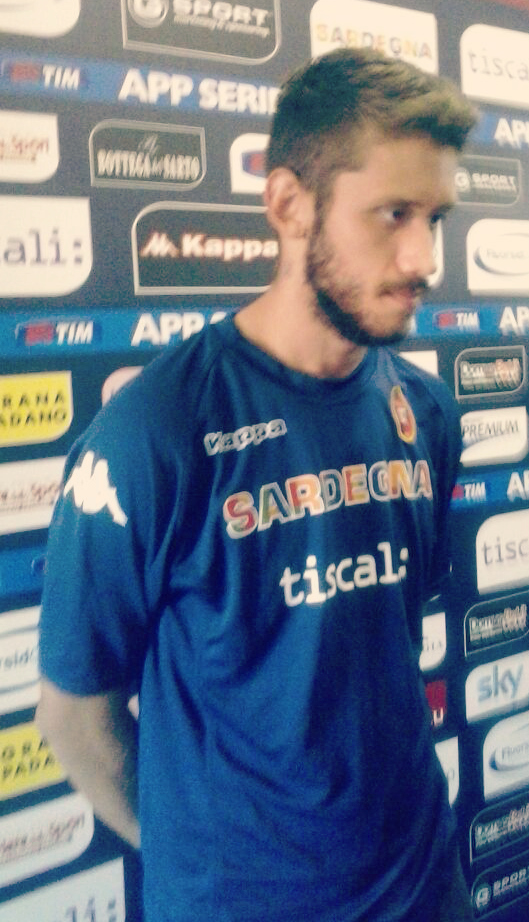

Personal information
- Date of birth: 3 April 1992 (age 34)
- Place of birth: Turin, Italy
- Height: 1.90 m (6 ft 3 in)
- Position: Centre back

Team information
- Current team: Derthona
- Number: 4

Youth career
- 2005–2010: Torino
- 2010–2011: Inter Milan

Senior career*
Years	Team	Apps	(Gls)
2010	Torino	1	(0)
2010–2014	Inter Milan	0	(0)
2011–2012	→ Gubbio (loan)	36	(0)
2012–2013	→ Spezia (loan)	21	(2)
2013–2014	→ Padova (loan)	33	(0)
2014–2016	Cagliari	7	(0)
2015	→ Bari (loan)	3	(0)
2016	→ Virtus Entella (loan)	6	(0)
2016–2019	Virtus Entella	54	(0)
2019–2021	Pisa	77	(1)
2021–2022	Alessandria	16	(0)
2022–2023	Feralpisalò	11	(0)
2023–2025	Avellino	23	(1)
2025	Lucchese	13	(0)
2026–	Derthona	9	(1)

International career
2007–2008	Italy U16	10	(0)
2008–2009	Italy U17	18	(0)
2009–2010	Italy U18	7	(0)
2010–2011	Italy U19	10	(0)
2011–2013	Italy U20	9	(0)
- * Club domestic league appearances and goals as of 15 February 2026

Simone Benedetti (born 3 April 1992) is an Italian professional footballer who plays as a centre back for Serie D club Derthona.

He is the son of former Italian football player, Silvano Benedetti.

== Club career ==
=== Torino ===
He grew up from an early age in the Torino youth system and played for all the youth teams up to the Primavera in 2008, under the guidance of Antonino Asta. After collecting an appearance on the bench in Serie A on 16 January 2008 in a match away against Roma, he made his debut among the professionals ranks in the last round of the 2009–10 season, playing as a starter against Cittadella, won 1–0. The team reached the playoffs, but lost in the final with Brescia, but except for an appearance on the bench against Sassuolo, he was only a spectator.

=== Internazionale ===
On 22 July 2010 he was sold to Inter Milan in co-ownership deal for €2 million in 5-year contract, co-currently Alen Stevanović joined the opposite direction also in co-ownership deal for €2M. Due to the injury crisis, he also selected to 2010 FIFA Club World Cup but did not play. With Inter's Primavera under-20 team, he won 2011 Torneo di Viareggio.

On 13 July 2011 he left for Serie B newcomer Gubbio on loan. He was one of the starting centre-back of the team, in either 3–5–2 or 4–4–2 formation.

In June 2012 the co-ownership between Torino and Inter was renewed. As Torino was promoted to Serie A, Benedetti continued his Serie B career with Spezia Calcio. In June 2013 Benedetti joined Inter outright; Stevanović also joined Turin in the same formula. On 20 July 2013 he was signed by another Serie B club Padova.

=== Cagliari and loan ===
On 7 July 2014 he was purchased by Cagliari, coached by Zdenek Zeman, for €1 million. On 19 October 2014 he made his debut in Serie A at home to Sampdoria.

After only five appearances he was loaned to Bari in Serie B, making his first appearance for the Galletti on 3 March 2015 against Catania.

=== Entella ===
On 26 January 2016 he was signed by Virtus Entella, in a temporary deal as well as a pre-set price. On 1 July Entella excised the option to sign Benedetti outright.

=== Pisa ===
On 16 January 2019, he joined Pisa.

=== Alessandria ===
On 3 August 2021, he signed a two-year contract with Alessandria.

=== Feralpisalò ===
On 23 August 2022, Benedetti moved to Feralpisalò on a two-year deal.

=== Avellino ===
On 20 January 2023, Benedetti joined Avellino.

== International career ==
Benedetti started his youth international career in a born 1992/1993 training camp., he then received first call-up for 2007 under-16 international Val-de-Marne tournament. He played the first two match of 2009 U-17 Euro qualifying, which Italy was the group runner-up. In the elite round he played all 3 games and Italy was the group winner. Despite named as the captain, he did not play the first match of the final round and only made a substitute appearance in the second match, for Vincenzo Camilleri. Benedetti returned to the starting XI and partnered with Alessio Campoli (due to the injury of Camilleri) in the third group stage match and the semi-final, losing to Germany. Despite finished fourth, Azzurrini still qualified for 2009 FIFA U-17 World Cup. In the World Junior Cup, Michele Camporese and Camilleri became the new starting centre-backs and Benedetti only played the third group stage match and the round of 16 as sub. He only started the last match, the quarter-finals due to the suspension of Federico Mannini (who succeed Camilleri as starter), losing to Switzerland, which also the Euro losing semi-finalists.

In 2011 U-19 Euro qualifying, Benedetti started twice (partnered with Camporese) and also played twice in the elite round as captain (partnered with Paolo Rozzio), only replaced by Camporese in the last match. Italy finished as the runner-up, failed to qualify to the next stage by losing to the Group winner Republic of Ireland.

In 2011–12 member he was selected as a member of U-20 team for 2011–12 Four Nations Tournament. He played three times, against Switzerland twice and Germany once. He also played another friendlies against Ghana, Macedonia and Denmark.

== Honours ==
=== Club ===
Internazionale (U19)

- Torneo di Viareggio: 2011
