= Andrea Lussardi =

Italian footballer (born 1992)

Personal information
- Date of birth: 20 January 1992 (age 34)
- Place of birth: Lodi, Italy
- Height: 1.78 m (5 ft 10 in)
- Position: Winger

Youth career
- Piacenza
- 2010–2011: Internazionale

Senior career*
Years	Team	Apps	(Gls)
2011–2012	Piacenza	5	(0)
2012–2013	Pavia	27	(0)

International career
2010	Italy U18	1	(0)
2010–2011	Italy U19	2	(0)
- * Club domestic league appearances and goals as of end of 2012–13 season

Andrea Lussardi (born 20 January 1992) is a former Italian footballer who played as a winger.

== Club career ==
=== Youth career ===
Born in Lodi, Lombardy, Lussardi started his career at Emilia–Romagna club Piacenza. Lussardi got scholarship for his good academic result as a football trainee. A month after his national U18 debut, Piacenza decided to sell him. On 30 June 2010, the last day of 2009–10 financial year, Lussardi along with Italy U16 internationals Matteo Colombi were sold to F.C. Internazionale Milano in co-ownership deal for a total fee of €1.5 million, in five-year contract. In exchange, former youth internationals Andrea Mei and Luca Tremolada (who play same position and just 2 months older than Lussardi) was signed by Piacenza first team also in co-ownership deal for €1.5 million. Lussardi had already played for Inter in 2010 Trofeo Dossena, losing to Lega Pro U20 representative team in the semi-finals on 16 June 2010.

Lussardi made 14 starts for the under-20 team in the Primavera league without a goal. The team had Simone Dell'Agnello as centre forward and Denis Alibec and Mame Baba Thiam as forward in 4–3–3 formation. Coach Fulvio Pea had also tested several players to partner with Dell'Agnello.

Lussardi won 2011 Torneo di Viareggio as unused bench in the final. In the playoffs round of the league, Pea and the coaching team rested two of the three senior players of the reserve, Alibec and Davide Faraoni in order to train the younger players. Lussardi played both first round and second round as starting wing forward in 4–3–3 and 4–4–2 formation, losing to Milan after penalty shootout.

In June 2011 Piacenza decided not to renew Mei and Tremolada's co-ownership, as they were not the regular in 2010–11 Serie B as well as the relegation of the club, thus not economical to give chance to the two players to play as a process of player development Co-currently, Internazionale sold back Lussardi and Colombi but renewed the loan of the latter, as part of compensation and youth plan. The four players were priced for the original estimate, which the 50% registration rights were: Mei €750,000, Tremolada €750,000, Lussardi €900,000, Colombi €600,000, thus again did not involve cash.

=== Piacenza ===
Lussardi returned to Piacenza and was a member of the first team and an overage player of the reserve in Berretti League. He played twice in 2011–12 Coppa Italia. Lussardi was one of the attacking midfielder in 4–2–3–1 formation. However, he was injured by a foul of Davide Moro and missed a few months. Lussardi made his debut in 2011–12 Lega Pro Prima Divisione on 4 April 2012, after the club was declared bankruptcy by the court, with Lussardi and Colombi became a financial burden for the club with impaired performance. Lussardi substituted Francesco Lisi in that match. He made his first start on 25 April (rescheduled week 31), after the last match of the reserve league on 21 April.

In June 2012 no investor wished to take over the shares of Piacenza for just €50,000 (as the new shareholder still had to recapitalization and the club was heavily penalized in 2011–12 Italian football scandal), thus Piacenza did not apply to enter professional league and folded. As FIGC did not forced players to have any obligation to sign a new contract with the new club formed in the same city, thus Lussardi would become a free agent and the indebtedness of the club would further damaged by the write-off of the high accounting value of Lussardi and Colombi (about €2.25 million).

=== Reggina ===
On 7 July 2012, Serie B club Reggina signed Lussardi while Colombi joined Internazionale definitively. On 9 August 2012, he moved to Pavia on a loan deal. In June 2013 the club excised the option to sign him in co-ownership deal. In November 2013 he retired from professional football.

== International career ==
Lussardi received a call-up from Italy national under-17 football team in 2008. However Lussardi did not enter the squad to the elite qualification. In February 2010 Lussardi received a call-up from Italy national under-18 football team for a training camp, but did not go to 2010 Slovakia Cup either in April. In May 2010 Lussardi made his debut against Belarus. He substituted Francesco Finocchio (midfielder) at half time. Lussardi played twice for Italy national under-19 football team in 2010–11 season, replacing Simone Verdi, in two of the six friendlies between the qualification and the elite qualification.
