= Luca Tremolada =

Italian footballer (born 1991)

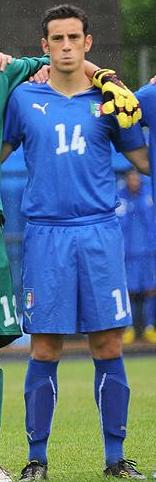
- Tremolada in 2010

Personal information
- Date of birth: 25 November 1991 (age 34)
- Place of birth: Milan, Italy
- Height: 1.85 m (6 ft 1 in)
- Positions: Winger; attacking midfielder

Team information
- Current team: Cjarlins Muzane
- Number: 10

Youth career
- 2004–2010: Inter

Senior career*
Years	Team	Apps	(Gls)
2010–2012	Inter	0	(0)
2010–2011	→ Piacenza (loan)	8	(0)
2011–2012	→ Pisa (loan)	23	(0)
2012–2013	Como	27	(4)
2013–2015	Varese	16	(1)
2014–2015	→ Reggiana (loan)	23	(2)
2015–2016	Arezzo	33	(10)
2016–2019	Entella	39	(5)
2017–2018	→ Ternana (loan)	42	(12)
2018–2019	→ Brescia (loan)	18	(4)
2019–2020	Brescia	1	(0)
2020–2021	Pordenone	12	(1)
2021	→ Cosenza (loan)	21	(5)
2021–2025	Modena	96	(17)
2024–2025	→ Ascoli (loan)	30	(1)
2025–2026	Folgore Caratese	23	(9)
2026–	Cjarlins Muzane	0	(0)

International career
2009	Italy U18	5	(3)
2008–2010	Italy U19	14	(1)
2011	Italy U20	3	(0)
- * Club domestic league appearances and goals as of 20 June 2026

Luca Tremolada (born 25 November 1991) is an Italian footballer who plays as a midfielder for Serie D club Cjarlins Muzane.

== Club career ==
=== Inter (youth) ===
Born in Milan, Lombardy, Tremolada started his career at Inter. He played a few friendlies for the first team. He won the 2009–10 UEFA Champions League as an unused member of the first team squad, in which the team named him as one of the U21 youth product in the list.

He was the joint-top scorer in the Allievi Nazionali under-17 team in the 2007–08 season (along with Sulaiman Sesay Fullah), this was because previous top scorer Mattia Destro had been promoted to Primavera under-20 team and played less regularly in Allievi Nazionali.

=== Piacenza ===
In summer 2010, he left for Serie B club Piacenza in a co-ownership deal for €750,000 along with defender Andrea Mei, and keeper Luca Stocchi, while Inter signed Andrea Lussardi and Matteo Colombi . Additionally, Piacenza loaned Nicola Milani and Fabio Hoxha from Inter's youth teams. Tremolada immediately entered Piacenza's first team, starting the first match, beating Lanciano 5–3 in the 2010–11 Coppa Italia. He also started the next 2 matches in Serie B, as a winger in a 4-2-3-1 formation. He then lost his starting place to Alessandro Marchi and received his last first team call-up on 17 September. The coach changed the tactics to 4-3-3 and preferred Marchi as right midfielder. He played his fourth Serie B match in November and only played four more times in the second half of the 2010–11 season.

On 24 June 2011 he returned to Inter along with Mei and Piacenza bought back Lussardi and Colombi.

=== Return to Inter ===
Tremolada became an Inter player again in June 2011. He left for A.C. Pisa 1909 in a temporary deal for the 2011–12 season. In May 2012, Tremolada was included in the 20-man squad of Inter for their Indonesia friendly tour. He scored the third goal against the Indonesia League Selection as a substitute for Samuele Longo.

=== Como ===
On 18 July 2012 Tremolada was signed by Calcio Como in a new co-ownership deal for a token fee. Internazionale made a write-down on Tremolada's accounting value for €1.162 million.

=== Varese ===
On 5 July 2013 he was signed by Varese. On 1 September 2014 he left for Reggiana on a temporary deal.

=== Arezzo ===
On 29 July 2015 he was signed by Arezzo.

=== Entella ===
In July 2016 Tremolada was signed by Entella.

==== Ternana (loan) ====
On 25 August 2017 Tremolada joined Ternana on a temporary deal, with an option to purchase.

=== Brescia ===
In July 2018, Tremolada joined Brescia, initially on loan.

=== Pordenone ===
On 31 January 2020, he moved to Serie B club Pordenone and signed a 2 and 1/2-year contract.

==== Loan to Cosenza ====
On 13 January 2021, he was loaned to Cosenza.

=== Modena ===
On 31 August 2021, he signed a two-year contract with Modena. On 30 August 2024, Tremolada was loaned to Ascoli, with an obligation to buy in case of Ascoli's promotion to Serie B.

== International career ==
Tremolada was a regular member of Azzurrini U19 team, playing almost all matches from 2008 to 2010. The U19 (born 1991) team's season was started early due to the exit of the previous age group (born 1990 U19 team) in October 2008. Tremolada made his U19 team debut along with Inter teammates Mattia Destro and Luca Caldirola (who were U19 regulars too), winning against Romania 3–1 in December 2008. He then played successive appearances for the U19 team, against Norway (March), Ukraine (April) and Denmark (September). Missing a friendly in October, he played all 3 matches in qualifying and the next 3 friendlies. In the elite round, he also played all 3 matches, but only one as a starter. That match he scored a goal against Northern Ireland.

Tremolada also played for the 2008–09 season's U18 team, which was de facto the same as the U19 team, but the opponent's ages were different. He scored a goal in his U18 debut, against Denmark U18 in January 2009. He also played at a U18 tournament in Slovakia in April 2009, scoring 2 goals.

Tremolada played twice in the 2010 UEFA European Under-19 Football Championship, which Italy finished as the last in Group B without any wins or even goals.

== Career statistics ==
=== Club ===
As of match played 23 February 2022

Appearances and goals by club, season and competition
Club	Season	League			National Cup		Other		Total	
Club	Season	Division	Apps	Goals	Apps	Goals	Apps	Goals	Apps	Goals
Piacenza (loan)	2010–11	Serie B	8	0	2	0	—		10	0
Pisa (loan)	2011–12	Lega Pro 1	23	0	2	1	—		25	1
Como	2012–13	Lega Pro 1	27	4	0	0	—		27	4
Varese	2013–14	Serie B	15	1	3	1	—		18	2
Varese	2014–15	Serie B	1	0	2	0	—		3	0
Varese	Total		16	1	5	1	0	0	21	2
Reggiana (loan)	2014–15	Lega Pro	23	2	—		—		23	2
Arezzo	2015–16	Lega Pro	33	10	0	0	—		33	10
Entella	2016–17	Serie B	39	5	2	0	—		41	5
Entella	2017–18	Serie B	0	0	1	0	—		1	0
Entella	Total		39	5	3	0	0	0	42	5
Ternana (loan)	2017–18	Serie B	42	12	0	0	—		42	12
Brescia (loan)	2018–19	Serie B	18	4	2	0	—		20	4
Brescia	2019–20	Serie A	1	0	1	0	—		2	0
Brescia	Total		19	4	3	0	0	0	22	4
Pordenone	2019–20	Serie B	12	1	0	0	2 (Note: Appearance(s) in Promotion Playoffs)	1	14	2
Cosenza (loan)	2020–21	Serie B	21	5	0	0	—		21	5
Modena	2021–22	Serie C	23	7	0	0	—		23	7
Career total			286	51	15	2	2	1	303	54

== Honours ==
Internazionale Youth

- Campionato Nazionale Allievi: 2008
- Campionato Giovanissimi Nazionali: 2006
