= Matteo Colombi =

Italian footballer

Personal information
- Date of birth: 13 June 1994 (age 32)
- Place of birth: Broni, Italy
- Height: 1.90 m (6 ft 3 in)
- Position: Forward

Team information
- Current team: Adriese
- Number: 11

Youth career
- –2012: Piacenza
- 2010–2012: → Inter Milan (loan)
- 2012–2013: Inter Milan

Senior career*
| Years | Team | Apps | (Gls) |
| 2013–2015 | Inter Milan | 0 | (0) |
| 2014 | → Torino (loan) | 0 | (0) |
| 2014–2015 | → Savona (loan) | 10 | (0) |
| 2015 | → Torres (loan) | 4 | (1) |
| 2015–2016 | OltrepòVoghera | 20 | (15) |
| 2016–2017 | Maceratese | 51 | (10) |
| 2017 | Piacenza | 1 | (0) |
| 2017–2019 | AlbinoLeffe | 47 | (4) |
| 2019 | Rezzato | 12 | (7) |
| 2019–2020 | Sanremese | 22 | (4) |
| 2020–2021 | Fanfulla | 9 | (1) |
| 2021 | Casale | 26 | (7) |
| 2021–2022 | Campodarsego | 31 | (17) |
| 2022 | Prato | 17 | (3) |
| 2022–2023 | Cjarlins Muzane | 16 | (0) |
| 2023– | Adriese | 17 | (3) |

International career
| 2010–2011 | Italy U17 | 10 | (0) |
- * Club domestic league appearances and goals as of 21 December 2023

Matteo Colombi (born 13 June 1994) is an Italian footballer who plays as a forward for Serie D club Adriese.

== Career ==
Born in Broni, in the Province of Pavia, Lombardy region, Colombi started his career at Emilian club Piacenza.

=== Inter Milan ===
In June 2010 Colombi and Andrea Lussardi were signed by Lombard club Inter Milan, with Andrea Mei and Luca Tremolada moved to opposite direction, all 4 in co-ownership deals. In June 2011, both clubs bought back their youth products, however Colombi remained in Milan in a temporary deal for another year. After Piacenza F.C. S.p.A. had bankrupted in summer 2012, Colombi re-joined Inter on a free transfer. Since 2011 Colombi had played for Inter first team in some friendly matches, as well as unused bench in competitive matches. Since Andrea Stramaccioni was sacked, Colombi did not receive call-up from Walter Mazzarri, for competitive match. Colombi had played once under Mazzarri, against Lugano in friendly. On 30 January 2014, as part of Danilo D'Ambrosio's deal, Colombi moved to Torino in a temporary deal, with an option to purchase. Torino did not excised the option to sign Colombi at the end of season.

On 1 August 2014 Colombi and Jacopo Galimberti were signed by Savona. On 1 February 2015 Colombi left for Torres in another temporary deal.

=== AlbinoLeffe ===
On 30 January 2019 he was released from his AlbinoLeffe contract by mutual consent.
