= Carlo Raffaele Trezzi =

Italian footballer (born 1982)

Carlo Trezzi
Personal information
- Full name: Carlo Raffaele Trezzi
- Date of birth: 31 May 1982 (age 44)
- Place of birth: Milan, Italy
- Height: 1.73 m (5 ft 8 in)
- Position: Midfielder

Youth career
- Internazionale

Senior career*
Years	Team	Apps	(Gls)
2000–2001	Internazionale	1	(0)
2001-2002	→ Avellino (loan)	7	(0)
2002–2008	Pro Patria	143	(13)
2008–2010	Foggia	34	(2)
2010–2011	Perugia	5	(0)
2011	Insubria	9	(3)
2011-2012	Caronnese	29	(6)

International career
1998	Italy U15	5	(0)
- * Club domestic league appearances and goals

Carlo Raffaele Trezzi (born 31 May 1982) is a former Italian football player who played as a midfielder.

== Football career ==
Trezzi started his career at Internazionale. He made his debut against Bologna on 17 June 2001.

While he was too old for the youth team (Under-20), he was loaned to Serie C1 side Avellino, and then transferred to Pro Patria on loan and later became a co-ownership deal in 2004, for €125,000. During the July 2008 he was transferred to Foggia.
