= Vincenzo Sgambato =

Italian footballer (born 1988)

Personal information
- Date of birth: 27 January 1988 (age 38)
- Place of birth: Avellino, Italy
- Position: Right-back

Youth career
- Napoli
- 2004–2006: Internazionale
- 2006–2007: Lecce
- 2007–2008: Benevento

Senior career*
Years	Team	Apps	(Gls)
2008–2010	Benevento	1	(0)
2009	→ Vibonese (loan)	11	(0)
2009–2010	→ Foggia (loan)	14	(0)
2010–2013	Gavorrano	43	(0)
2013	Melfi	3	(0)
2013–2014	Deruta	11	(0)
2013–2014	Civitanovese	15	(0)
2014	Pomigliano	6	(0)
2014–2015	Chieti	18	(0)

International career
2004	Italy U-16	5	(0)
2004	Italy U-17	2	(0)
2005	Italy EYOF team	3	(0)

Managerial career
- 2021–2022: Finale
- 2022–2023: Genoa U18 (assistant manager)
- 2023–: Genoa U19 (assistant manager)
Medal record
Men's Football
Representing Italy
European Youth Olympic Festival
Silver medal – second place	2005 Lignano Sabbiadoro	Team competition
- * Club domestic league appearances and goals

Vincenzo Sgambato (born 27 January 1988) is an Italian footballer.

== Biography ==
Born in Avellino, Campania, Sgambato started his career at Campanian side Napoli. After the Naples club went bankrupt, he joined Internazionale. In the first season he was the right-back of Allievi Nazionali under-17 team. In the next season he was promoted to Berretti under-18 team (B team of under-20 age group) His only appearances with the first team was a friendly during international fixture. Roberto Mancini fielded players without international duty against Swiss side Lugano.

He was transferred to Lecce in August 2006. He played a season in Primavera under-20 team before returned to Campania for Benevento. However he only played once in 2007–08 Serie C2 and played for Benevento's Berretti team as overage player in 2008–09 season. In January 2009 he was loaned to Vibonese and on 10 July loaned to Foggia as part of Ivan Pedrelli's deal.

In mid-2010 he was signed by Seconda Divisione newcomer Gavorrano and made his official debut on 18 August 2010, the first round of 2010–11 Coppa Italia Lega Pro. He also started for Gavorrano in the second cup match and the first round of the league. However he was rested in the third and fourth cup game, the mid-week fixture. That season he made a career high of 28 official appearances. He was suspended twice: 2 matches for being sent off in round 4 and one match for the fourth caution of the season in round 26. He was rested in the last round (the thirty).

On 1 February 2013 he was signed by Melfi; He did not play any game in the first half of 2012–13 season for Gavorrano.

=== International career ===
Sgambato received a few cap from Italy U-16 and U-17 team in friendlies to prepare for 2005 UEFA European Under-17 Football Championship, which only born in 1988 or after would eligible. Italy qualified as host. He was not selected to the final tournament, but selected to 2005 European Youth Olympic Festival from FIGC for born 1988/1989 mixed team. He played all three matches, finished as the runner-up.

== Honours ==
- Serie C2: 2008 (Benevento)
