= Alessandro Leopizzi =

Italian footballer (born 1980)

Personal information
- Date of birth: 30 May 1980 (age 45)
- Place of birth: Casarano, Italy
- Position: Goalkeeper

Senior career*
Years	Team	Apps	(Gls)
1995–1997	Casarano	4	(0)
1997–1998	Udinese	0	(0)
1998–1999	Southampton	0	(0)
1999–2003	SPAL	4	(0)
2003–2004	Fermana	0	(0)
2004	Nardò		
2005	Taranto	9	(0)
2005–2006	Gallipoli	0	(0)
2006–2007	SC Young Fellows Juventus	13	(0)
2007–2008	Juve Stabia	2	(0)
2008–2011	Nardò		
2011	Casarano		
2011–2012	Pierantonio		
2012–2014	Casarano		
2014–2015	Francavilla		
2015–2016	Pro Italia Galatina		
2016–2017	Mesagne		
2017–2018	Atletico Tricase		
2018–2019	Antonio Toma Maglie		
2019–2021	Virtus Matino		
2024-	ASD Capo di Leuca		
- * Club domestic league appearances and goals

Alessandro Leopizzi (born 30 May 1980) is an Italian footballer, currently playing in italian Prima Categoria club, ASD Capo di Leuca
