= Thomas Pedrabissi =

Italian footballer

Personal information
- Date of birth: 1 June 1995 (age 31)
- Place of birth: Como, Italy
- Position: Forward

Team information
- Current team: ASD Alta Brianza Calcio

Youth career
- 2006–2013: Inter Milan
- 2013–2014: Cesena

Senior career*
| Years | Team | Apps | (Gls) |
| 2014–2015 | Cesena | 1 | (0) |
| 2014–2015 | → Santarcangelo (loan) | 15 | (0) |
| 2015–2016 | AC Taverne | 17 | (9) |
| 2016–2017 | Pergolettese | 30 | (6) |
| 2018 | Varese | 15 | (4) |
| 2018–2019 | Borgosesia | 31 | (6) |
| 2019 | Sorrento | 9 | (0) |
| 2019–2020 | Verbania | 10 | (5) |
| 2020–2021 | Chieri | 33 | (3) |
| 2021–2022 | Sestese | | |
| 2022–2023 | Oltrepò FBC | | |
| 2023 | Solbiatese | | |
| 2023–2024 | AC Ardor Lazzate 1973 | | |
| 2024– | ASD Alta Brianza Calcio | | |

International career
| 2011–2012 | Italy U17 | 8 | (3) |
| 2012 | Italy U18 | 2 | (0) |
- * Club domestic league appearances and goals as of 09:33, 15 October 2026 (UTC)

Thomas Pedrabissi (born 1 June 1995) is an Italian footballer who plays as a forward for ASD Alta Brianza Calcio.

== Club career ==
=== Internazionale ===
Born in Como, Lombardy, Pedrabissi was a player for Lombard club F.C. Internazionale Milano from 2006 to 2013. He was a player for the under-12 team in "Esordienti" league, to under-18–19 "Primavera" reserve league in 2013. In January 2012 half of the registration rights of Pedrabissi was sold to fellow Serie A club A.C. Cesena (50% "card" tagged for €1 million) in exchange for Marko Livaja (50% "card" tagged for €2.25 million), who unable to sign by Inter directly, plus €1.25 million cash. While Cesena retained 50% registration rights of Livaja as gift with obligation to pay Livaja's former club – Hajduk Split €250,000. Pedrabissi signed a 2 1/2-year contract, which later extended to 4 1/2 after Pedrabissi made his professional debut. Pedrabissi remained in Inter in temporary deal for the rest of the season. In June 2012 the co-ownership deals were renewed. Pedrabissi remained in Inter youth system until June 2013, which Inter acquired Luca Caldirola (50% "card" tagged for €2.5 million) for €500,000 cash plus 50% registration rights of Pedrabissi (50% "card" tagged for €1 million), Del Piero (50% "card" tagged for €250,000) and Melgrati (50% "card" tagged for €750,000), which Caldirola was re-sold to Werder Bremen for €2.5 million, which in turn made 50% card of Del Piero, Melgrati plus Pedrabissi worth €750,000 in total in cash.

=== Cesena ===
Pedrabissi received call-up from Cesena's reserve on 17 July 2013, while his former Inter team-mate Garritano went to the first team. Since November 2013 Pedrabissi also received first team call-up, On 8 March 2014 Pedrabissi made his first team debut as a substitute of Marilungo in Serie B. Pedrabissi and Garritano (who also a sub) did not score any goal for Cesena.

Circa summer 2015 Cesena released Pedrabissi and Del Piero for free (one year earlier than their original contracts). The club also registered an accounting loss of €611,111, the residual accounting value of the players.

=== Switzerland ===
In summer 2015 he moved to Switzerland for an amateur club based in Torricella-Taverne.

=== Pergolettese ===
On 19 June 2016 Pedrabissi was signed by Pergolettese.

== International career ==
Pedrabissi scored 3 goals in 2012 UEFA European Under-17 Championship qualification. However Pedrabissi did not go to the elite qualification round.
