= 2011 Torneo di Viareggio =

2011 Viareggio Cup World Football Tournament Coppa Carnevale
63° Torneo di Viareggio

Tournament details
- Host country: Italy
- City: Viareggio
- Dates: February 21, 2011 - March 7, 2011
- Teams: 48

Final positions
- Champions: (Italy) Inter Milan
- Runners-up: (Italy) Fiorentina

Tournament statistics
- Matches played: 87
- Goals scored: 247 (2.84 per match)
- Top scorer(s): (Italy) Giuseppe De Luca (7) (Italy) Simone Dell'Agnello (7)
- Best player(s): (Italy) Simone Dell'Agnello

The 2011 winners of the Torneo di Viareggio (in English, the Viareggio Tournament, officially the Viareggio Cup World Football Tournament Coppa Carnevale), the annual youth football tournament held in Viareggio, Tuscany, are listed below.

== Format ==
The 48 teams are seeded in 12 pools, split up into 6-pool groups. Each team from a pool meets the others in a single tie. The winning club from each pool and two best runners-up from both group A and group B progress to the final knockout stage. All matches in the final rounds are single tie. The Round of 16 after envisions penalties and no extra time, while the rest of the final round matches include 30 minutes extra time and penalties to be played if the draw between teams still holds.

== Participating teams ==
Italian teams

- (Italy) Atalanta
- (Italy) Cesena
- (Italy) Empoli
- (Italy) Entella
- (Italy) Fiorentina
- (Italy) Genoa
- (Italy) Inter Milan
- (Italy) Juventus
- (Italy) Lazio
- (Italy) Lecce
- (Italy) Lumezzane
- (Italy) Napoli
- (Italy) A.S.D. Città di Marino
- (Italy) Milan
- (Italy) Palermo
- (Italy) Parma
- (Italy) Poggibonsi
- (Italy) Prato
- (Italy) Serie D Representatives
- (Italy) Reggina
- (Italy) Roma
- (Italy) Sambenedettese
- (Italy) Sampdoria
- (Italy) Sassuolo
- (Italy) Siena
- (Italy) Spezia
- (Italy) Taranto
- (Italy) Torino
- (Italy) Varese
- (Italy) Viareggio
- (Italy) Vicenza

European teams

- (Belgium) Anderlecht
- (Belgium) Bruges
- (Czech Republic) Dukla Praga
- (Switzerland) Grasshoppers
- (Serbia) Jedinstvo Ub
- (Denmark) Midtjylland
- (United Kingdom) Newcastle United
- (Denmark) Nordsjaelland
- (Russia) Spartak Mosca
- (Norway) Stabaek
- (Serbia) Red Star

African teams

- (Gabon) Emergence Brera
- (Sierra Leone) Kallon

Asian teams

- (Japan) Grampus

American teams

- (Paraguay) Nacional Asunción
- (United States) L.I.A.C. New York

Oceanian teams

- (Australia) APIA Leichhardt

== Group stage ==
=== Group A ===
==== Pool 1 ====
Team	Pts	Pls	W	D	L	GF	GA	GD
(Italy) Varese	9	3	3	0	0	13	3	+10
(Italy) Juventus	4	3	1	1	1	9	7	+2
(Belgium) Bruges	4	3	1	1	1	6	9	-3
(United States) L.I.A.C. New York	0	3	0	0	3	4	13	-9

==== Pool 2 ====
Team	Pts	Pld	W	D	L	GF	GA	GD
(Italy) Atalanta	9	3	3	0	0	8	2	+6
(Serbia) Red Star	4	3	1	1	1	4	4	0
(Italy) Cesena	3	3	1	0	2	5	5	0
(Italy) Sambenedettese	1	3	0	1	2	1	7	-6

==== Pool 3 ====
Team	Pts	Pld	W	D	L	GF	GA	GD
(Italy) Lazio	9	3	3	0	0	9	4	+5
(Belgium) Anderlecht	4	3	1	1	1	4	6	-2
(Italy) Torino	3	3	1	0	2	4	5	-1
(Switzerland) Grasshoppers	1	3	0	1	2	6	8	-2

==== Pool 4 ====
Team	Pts	Pld	W	D	L	GF	GA	GD
(Italy) Inter Milan	9	3	3	0	0	9	1	+8
(Italy) Serie D Repress.	6	3	2	0	1	6	2	+4
(Australia) APIA Leichhardt	3	3	1	0	2	1	6	-5
(Italy) Viareggio	0	3	0	0	3	0	7	-7

==== Pool 5 ====
Team	Pts	Pld	W	D	L	GF	GA	GD
(Italy) Reggina	7	3	2	1	0	4	2	+2
(Italy) Poggibonsi	4	3	1	1	1	2	2	0
(Italy) Empoli	3	3	0	3	0	4	4	0
(Russia) Spartak Mosca	1	3	0	1	2	3	5	-2

==== Pool 6 ====
Team	Pts	Pld	W	D	L	GF	GA	GD
(Italy) Sampdoria	7	3	2	1	0	11	1	+10
(Czech Republic) Dukla Prague	4	3	1	1	1	5	9	-4
(Italy) Vicenza	3	3	1	0	2	3	7	-4
(Italy) Entella	2	3	0	2	1	4	6	-2

=== Group B ===
==== Pool 7 ====
Team	Pts	Pld	W	D	L	GF	GA	GD
(Italy) Roma	7	3	2	1	0	11	3	+8
(Denmark) Midtjylland	5	3	1	2	0	5	2	+3
(Italy) Taranto	3	3	1	0	2	1	8	-7
(Serbia) Jedinstvo Ub	1	3	0	1	2	3	7	-4

==== Pool 8 ====
Team	Pts	Pld	W	D	L	GF	GA	GD
(Italy) Fiorentina	7	3	2	1	0	5	2	+3
(Paraguay) Nacional Asunción	3	3	0	3	0	4	4	0
(Italy) Lecce	2	3	0	2	1	3	4	-1
(United Kingdom) Newcastle United	2	3	0	2	1	3	5	-2

==== Pool 9 ====
Team	Pts	Pld	W	D	L	GF	GA	GD
(Japan) Grampus	5	3	1	2	0	5	2	+3
(Italy) Sassuolo	5	3	1	2	0	2	1	+1
(Norway) Stabaek	3	3	1	0	2	3	6	-3
(Italy) Milan	2	3	0	2	1	1	2	-1

==== Pool 10 ====
Team	Pts	Pld	W	D	L	GF	GA	GD
(Italy) Genoa	7	3	2	1	0	5	1	+4
(Italy) Parma	6	3	2	0	1	4	3	+1
(Italy) A.S.D. Città di Marino	2	3	0	2	1	3	4	-1
(Denmark) Nordsjaelland	1	3	0	1	2	2	6	-4

==== Pool 11 ====
Team	Pts	Pld	W	D	L	GF	GA	GD
(Italy) Palermo	9	3	3	0	0	7	1	+6
(Italy) Prato	6	3	2	0	1	4	2	+2
(Gabon) Emergence Brera	3	3	1	0	2	2	3	-1
(Italy) Lumezzane	0	3	0	0	3	0	7	-7

==== Pool 12 ====
Team	Pts	Pld	W	D	L	GF	GA	GD
(Italy) Siena	7	3	2	1	0	6	3	+3
(Italy) Napoli	4	3	1	1	1	3	3	0
(Italy) Spezia	4	3	1	1	1	5	5	0
(Sierra Leone) Kallon	1	3	0	1	2	2	5	-3

== Knockout stage ==
Round of 16
1 March (15:00 CET)
(Italy) Roma	0 (4)
(Italy) Sampdoria	0 (5)
1 March (15:00 CET)
(Italy) Varese	2
(Italy) Siena	0
1 March (15:00 CET)
(Italy) Fiorentina	2
(Italy) Reggina	1
1 March (15:00 CET)
(Italy) Lazio	0
(Italy) Parma	2
1 March (17:00 CET)
(Italy) Inter Milan	1
(Italy) Prato	0
1 March (15:00 CET)
(Italy) Genoa	3
(Italy) Serie D Repres.	1
1 March (15:00 CET)
(Italy) Palermo	1
(Italy) Juventus	2
1 March (15:00 CET)
(Italy) Atalanta	4
(Japan) Grampus	0

Quarter-finals
3 March (15:00 CET)
(Italy) Sampdoria	1
(Italy) Varese	3
3 March (15:00 CET)
(Italy) Fiorentina	0 (5)
(Italy) Parma	0 (4)
3 March (15:00 CET)
(Italy) Inter Milan	1
(Italy) Genoa	0
3 March (17:00 CET)
(Italy) Juventus	1
(Italy) Atalanta	3

Semi-finals
5 March (17:30 CET)
(Italy) Varese	1
(Italy) Fiorentina	2
5 March (15:00 CET)
(Italy) Inter Milan	0 (4)
(Italy) Atalanta	0 (1)

Final
7 March (15:00 CET)
(Italy) Fiorentina	0
(Italy) Inter Milan	2

== Champions ==
Torneo di Viareggio 2011 Champions

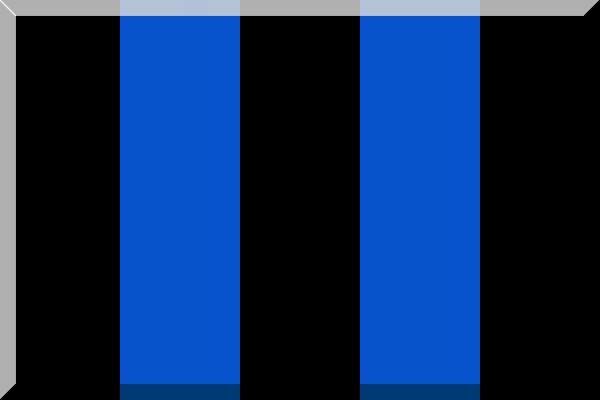

F.C. Internazionale Milan
6th time

== Top goal scorers ==
7 goals

- (Italy) Giuseppe De Luca ( (Italy) Varese)
- (Italy) Simone Dell'Agnello ( (Italy) Inter Milan)

5 goals

- (Romania) Denis Alibec ( (Italy) Inter Milan)
- (Italy) Simone Zaza ( (Italy) Sampdoria)
- (Italy) Pietro Iemmello ( (Italy) Fiorentina)
