= Nicola Redomi =

Italian footballer (born 1988)

Personal information
- Date of birth: 3 February 1988 (age 38)
- Place of birth: Massa, Italy
- Position: Midfielder

Team information
- Current team: FC Lucca

Youth career
- 2003–2007: Internazionale
- 2006–2007: → Pro Sesto (loan)

Senior career*
Years	Team	Apps	(Gls)
2007–2008	Internazionale	0	(0)
2007–2008	→ Castelnuovo (loan)	25	(1)
2008–2009	Valenzana	28	(2)
2009–2010	Figline	24	(5)
2010	Gubbio	0	(0)
2010–2011	Carrarese	18	(1)
2011–	FC Lucca	?	(?)

International career
2004	Italy U16	3	(0)
- * Club domestic league appearances and goals

Nicola Redomi (born 3 February 1988) is an Italian footballer who plays as a midfielder. Redomi almost spent his entire career at Tuscany region (except Valenzana and Gubbio). As of 2015 he is a Marina La Portuale player.

== Career ==
A youth product of Internazionale, Redomi left the club in 2006–07 season after failed to promote to Primavera team from Berretti team. He was loaned to Pro Sesto (along with Marco Dalla Costa, Daniele Federici, Nicholas Artico, Alessandro Brioschi, Alessio Colombo, Alessandro Mosca and Luca Palazzo) and Castelnuovo Garfagnana In July 2008, he was signed by Valenzana in a co-ownership deal with Inter, for €500. In June 2009, Valenzana bought him outright. but he left for Figline.

in July 2010 he was signed by Gubbio but injured during a pre-season friendly. He then failed to earn a formal contract with the club. In October 2010 he joined Carrarese.

In September he joined Eccellenza Tuscany (Italian sixth level) team FC Lucca (the successor of bankrupted Lucchese).
