= Lorenzo Paramatti =

Italian footballer

Personal information
- Date of birth: 2 January 1995 (age 31)
- Place of birth: Faenza, Italy
- Height: 1.85 m (6 ft 1 in)
- Position: Centre back

Team information
- Current team: Matera
- Number: 5

Youth career
- –2007: Russi
- 2007–2010: Bologna
- 2010–2014: Inter Milan

Senior career*
Years	Team	Apps	(Gls)
2014–2017	Bologna	0	(0)
2015–2016	→ Siena (loan)	15	(0)
2016	→ Messina (loan)	0	(0)
2016–2017	→ Santarcangelo (loan)	21	(0)
2017–2018	Gubbio	15	(1)
2018	→ Pro Piacenza (loan)	11	(1)
2019	ACS Poli Timișoara	15	(1)
2020	Rimini	4	(0)
2020–2023	FC U Craiova	54	(0)
2023–2024	Maccabi Petah Tikva	8	(0)
2024–2025	Flaminia	10	(0)
2025–	Matera	7	(0)

International career
2010	Italy U16	2	(0)
2011–2012	Italy U17	7	(0)
2012	Italy U18	1	(0)
- * Club domestic league appearances and goals as of 27 April 2025

Lorenzo Paramatti (born 2 January 1995) is an Italian footballer who plays as a defender for Serie D club Matera.

== Career ==
=== Youth career ===
Son of former SPAL (1986–1995) and Bologna (1995–2000; 2002–03) footballer Michele Paramatti, Lorenzo Paramatti was born in Faenza, in the Emilia-Romagna region; Lorenzo started his career at Emilian club Bologna. On 27 July 2010, he was signed by Internazionale in a definitive deal for €150,000 fee. Paramatti spent four seasons with Internazionale's youth teams until he was sold back to Bologna on 1 July 2014.

=== Bologna ===
On 1 July 2014, Paramatti was sold back to Bologna for €1 million fee on a two-year contract, with Saphir Taïder moved to Inter outright from Bologna on the same day, for €2 million fee.

Paramatti spent 2014–15 season with Bologna's under-19 team as an overage player in Campionato Nazionale Primavera.

==== Siena (loan) ====
On 16 July 2015 Paramatti was signed by Serie C newcomer Siena in a temporary deal. Paramatti made his professional debut in the first game of 2015–16 Coppa Italia Lega Pro; He was on the bench in the next cup match.

==== Santarcangelo (loan) ====
On 13 July 2016 Paramatti was signed by Messina in a temporary deal. On 26 August he was signed by Santarcangelo. He was assigned the number 2 shirt for his new team.

==== 2017–18 season ====
Paramatti returned from his loan on 1 July 2017. However, on 17 July he was released; Paramatti was not included in Bologna's pre-season camp.

==== ACS Poli Timișoara ====
On 4 February 2019 he signed a 6-month contract with Romanian club ACS Poli Timișoara.

=== Rimini ===
On 27 December 2019 he joined Serie C club Rimini.

=== Maccabi Petah Tikva ===
On 24 August 2023 signed for Maccabi Petah Tikva.

== Honours ==
FC U Craiova

- Liga II: 2020–21
