= Andrea Mei =

Italian footballer (born 1989)

Personal information
- Full name: Andrea Mei
- Date of birth: 18 May 1989 (age 37)
- Place of birth: Urbino, Italy
- Height: 1.84 m (6 ft 0 in)
- Position: Defender

Youth career
- Vis Pesaro
- 2004–2009: Inter Milan
- 2007–2008: → Chievo (loan)

Senior career*
Years	Team	Apps	(Gls)
2009–2013	Inter Milan	0	(0)
2009–2010	→ Crotone (loan)	0	(0)
2010	→ Lumezzane (loan)	8	(0)
2010–2011	→ Piacenza (loan)	14	(0)
2011–2012	→ VVV-Venlo (loan)	11	(0)
2014	Vis Pesaro	1	(0)
2015–2016	Fano	14	(0)
2016	Tropical Coriano	?	(?)
2016–2017	Urbania Calcio	?	(?)
2017–2019	Atletico Alma	?	(?)

International career
2004–2005	Italy U-16	6	(0)
2005	Italy U-17	1	(0)
2006	Italy U-18	2	(0)
2006	Italy U-19	2	(0)
- * Club domestic league appearances and goals

Andrea Mei (born 18 May 1989) is an Italian footballer who plays as a centre-back.

== Club career ==
Mei was signed by Inter Milan in August 2004 along with Luca Gentili.

He was sold to Piacenza Calcio along with Luca Tremolada in co-ownership deal for a total of €1.5 million on 30 June 2010. However Inter also signed Andrea Lussardi and Matteo Colombi from Piacenza in co-ownership deal for the same price. The players returned to their own clubs in June 2011 for the original price.

In summer 2011 he left for Dutch club Venlose Voetbal Vereniging in a temporary deal. His contract with Inter was terminated in January 2013 in mutual consent. Inter had to write down the residual accounting value of the contract for €344,000.
