= Alessandro Cannataro =

Italian footballer (born 1995)

Personal information
- Date of birth: 20 April 1995 (age 31)
- Place of birth: Italy
- Position: Midfielder

Senior career*
Years	Team	Apps	(Gls)
-2015	Inter Milan	0	(0)
2013-2014	A.S. Livorno Calcio→(loan)	0	(0)
2014-2015	Aurora Pro Patria 1919→(loan)	15	(0)
2015-2016	A.F.C. Bournemouth	0	(0)
2016/2017	Marbella FC		
2016/2017	CD Gerena	11	(0)
2016/2017	Calcio Lecco 1912		
2017/2018	U.S. Ciserano		
2017/18-2019	Sondrio Calcio		
2019/2020	US Levico Terme		
2019/2020	Fenegrò Calcio		
2020-	GS Castanese		
- * Club domestic league appearances and goals

Alessandro Cannataro (born 20 April 1995 in Italy) is an Italian footballer.
