= Simone Dell'Agnello =

Italian footballer (born 1992)

Personal information
- Date of birth: 22 April 1992 (age 34)
- Place of birth: Livorno, Italy
- Height: 1.90 m (6 ft 3 in)
- Position: Forward

Team information
- Current team: Budoni

Youth career
- Livorno
- 2007–2011: Inter

Senior career*
Years	Team	Apps	(Gls)
2011–2018	Livorno	32	(2)
2013–2014	→ Südtirol (loan)	20	(5)
2014–2015	→ Barletta (loan)	5	(0)
2015–2016	→ Savona (loan)	25	(3)
2017–2018	→ Cuneo (loan)	34	(8)
2018–2019	Como	29	(10)
2019–2020	Arezzo	0	(0)
2020–2021	Foggia	32	(3)
2021–2022	Grosseto	13	(0)
2022	Seregno	13	(2)
2022–2023	Franciacorta	4	(0)
2023–	Budoni	1	(0)

International career
2007–2008	Italy U-16	10	(3)
2008–2009	Italy U-17	16	(4)
2010	Italy U-18	4	(1)
2011	Italy U-19	3	(0)
2011	Italy U-20	1	(0)
- * Club domestic league appearances and goals as of 20 December 2023

Simone Dell'Agnello (born 22 April 1992) is an Italian footballer who plays as a forward for Serie D club Budoni.

== Club career ==
=== Youth career ===
Born in Livorno, Tuscany, Dell'Agnello joined Lombard club Inter Milan in 2007. He was the club's third highest scorer in the under-17 team with 11 goals in the "Allievi Nazionali" League group stage (behind Luca Tremolada and Sulaiman Sesay Fullah), (in fact he was eligible for "Allievi Regionali" (Lombard) League but was promoted to "Allievi Nazionali" directly) in which he scored 22 league goals the following season. He was the understudy of central forward Mattia Destro and Denis Alibec in Primavera under-20 team in 2009–10 season. That season he also won UEFA Under-18 Challenge, an experimental match against Bayern Munich youth team. Both teams used players born in 1991, which means Inter lost keeper Belec fullbacks Donati and Mbida, midfielders Fortunato, Krhin and wing forward Beretta in the starting XI. Moreover, Inter also rested Destro. Dell'Agnello played that match as one of the 3 forwards and Alibec scored 2–0 for Inter.

After Destro's departure, Dell'Agnello scored 15 goals in the league and also the joint-top-scorer of 2011 Torneo di Viareggio along with Varese's Giuseppe De Luca with 7 goals. Inter was the champion of the tournament and Dell'Agnello himself also won the Golden Boy award.

Dell'Agnello also played a few games for Inter first team in friendlies, including 2010 Pirelli Cup. As he eligible to UEFA List B since 2010 (until 2013–14 or he leave the club), he was named in Inter's European squad and was an unused bench in Bremen. Since the appointment of Leonardo, he also received a few call-up to the first team but failed to make competitive debut.

=== Livorno ===
In 2011–12 season he returned to Livorno in a co-ownership deal, as part of the deal of Francesco Bardi to Inter in a co-ownership deal, which Livorno also signed Luca Siligardi in a co-ownership deal. Dell'Agnello made his competitive debut in 2011–12 Coppa Italia third round, substituted Paulinho, losing to Chievo 0–1. In November he faced an anterior cruciate ligament injury in his right leg. In June 2012 the co-ownership deals were terminated.

In the 2012–13 Serie B season he scored his first goal for Livorno against Ascoli in Ascoli-Livorno 1-5. The team promoted to Serie A at the end of season.

==== Loan career ====
On 11 July 2013 he was signed by Lega Pro Prima Divisione club Südtirol in a temporary deal. In summer 2014 he was signed by Barletta.

On 10 September 2015 Dell'Agnello was signed by Savona in a temporary deal.

==== Return to Livorno ====
In 2016–17 season, Dell'Agnello was a member of Livorno's first team. He played 12 times in 2016–17 Lega Pro.

==== Cuneo (loan) ====
On 28 July 2017 Dell'Agnello joined Cuneo on a temporary deal. He was assigned number 24 shirt.

=== Como ===
On 11 October 2018, he joined Serie D club Como.

=== Arezzo ===
On 12 August 2019, he signed a 2-year contract with Arezzo. His Arezzo contract was terminated by mutual consent on 24 September 2020.

=== Foggia ===
On 7 October 2020, he joined Foggia.

=== Seregno ===
On 2 February 2022, Dell'Agnello signed with Seregno.

== International career ==
Dell'Agnello started his youth international career in a born 1992/1993 training camp., he then received first call-up for 2007 under-16 international Val-de-Marne tournament. Played twice and scored once in 2009 U-17 Euro qualifying, he only played once in the elite round. In the final round Dell'Agnello played twice in the group stage, substituting midfielder Stephan El Shaarawy, and, as the starting forward in the third match, scored a goal. In the semi-final he continued to partner with Giacomo Beretta, ahead Alberto Libertazzi, losing to Germany 0–2, but still qualified to 2009 FIFA U-17 World Cup. In the World Junior Cup first game, he was substituted by Federico Carraro in the 59th minute, since then losing the starting place, only played again as sub in the quarter-finals (for Pietro Iemmello), losing to Switzerland 1–2.

Dell'Agnello did not enter Daniele Zoratto's under-19 team until March 2011 played a friendly match against Netherlands as sub (for Iemmello) However he did not enter the squad to 2011 UEFA European Under-19 Football Championship elite qualification. Instead, he played the 6th match of 2010–11 Four Nations Tournament.

== Honours ==
=== Youth ===
Inter

- Torneo di Viareggio: 2011
- Allievi Nazionali: 2008
