= Federico Mannini =

Italian footballer (born 1992)

Personal information
- Date of birth: 18 April 1992 (age 34)
- Place of birth: Siena, Italy
- Height: 1.84 m (6 ft 1/2 in)
- Positions: Left back; centre-back

Youth career
- Siena
- 2011: → Internazionale (loan)

Senior career*
Years	Team	Apps	(Gls)
2011–2014	Siena	0	(0)
2011–2012	→ Triestina (loan)	12	(0)
2012–2013	→ San Marino (loan)	21	(0)
2013–2014	→ Cosenza (loan)	25	(1)

International career^{‡}
2009	Italy U-17	3	(0)
2009–2010	Italy U-18	7	(0)
2010–2011	Italy U-19	2	(0)
2011	Italy U-20	1	(0)
- * Club domestic league appearances and goals as of end of 2013–14 season ‡ National team caps and goals as of end of 2010–11 season

Federico Mannini (born 18 April 1992) is an Italian footballer, who plays as a defender.

A member of 2009 FIFA U-17 World Cup, Mannini made his competitive debut in 2011–12 Coppa Italia.

== Club career ==
=== Siena and loans ===
Born in Siena, Tuscany, Mannini started his career at Siena. In January 2011 he was signed by Internazionale along with national team team-mate Francesco Bardi (from Livorno), rejoining defenders Simone Benedetti and Felice Natalino, all of 2009 FIFA U-17 World Cup. However, he failed to play regularly in the Primavera under-20 team, in which the usual left-back was Cristiano Biraghi.

In June Inter did not exercise the option to sign him in the definitive deal, and in July he left for the newly relegated team Triestina. He made his debut against Novara in 2011–12 Coppa Italia, losing 0–4.

In 2012, he was signed by San Marino Calcio. On 29 August 2013 he left for Cosenza.

== International career ==
Mannini started his international career with the Italy U-18 team in 2009–10 season. Despite not playing for Azzurrini in 2008–09 U-17 Euro final round, he was selected for 2009 FIFA U-17 World Cup (which was the extension of the 2008–09 U-17 season) and played his first U-17 game in round 2, replacing centre-back Vincenzo Camilleri at half-time. He was started the next two games, partnering with Michele Camporese, winning United States in the round of 16. However, he also cautioned for the second time, suspended for the quarter-finals. Azzurrini finished as the losing quarter-finalists. Despite a regular U-18 team (which he played in the 2010 Slovakia youth Cup), the feeder team of U-19, he was picked by U-19 coach Daniele Zoratto only twice in friendlies, although he received some call-up since August 2010. He started the first one and as a substitute for Emanuele Suagher in the second one.

== Honours ==
Inter Primavera

- Torneo di Viareggio: 2011
