= Marco Dalla Costa =

Italian footballer (born 1988)

Personal information
- Date of birth: 25 March 1988 (age 38)
- Place of birth: Pinerolo, Italy
- Position: Forward

Youth career
- Pinerolo
- 2003–2006: Internazionale

Senior career*
Years	Team	Apps	(Gls)
2006–2009	Pro Sesto	24	(3)
2008–2009	→ Sangiovannese (loan)	28	(3)
2009–2010	Olbia	5	(0)
2010	→ Pro Sesto (loan)	5	(0)
2010–2011	Caratese	29	(13)
2011–2012	Novara	0	(0)
2011–2012	→ Pro Patria (loan)	14	(1)
2012	→ Renate (loan)	8	(2)
2012–2014	Bra	45	(16)
2014–2015	Pro Settimo	23	(7)
2015–2016	Pinerolo	34	(18)
2016	Bra	8	(1)
2016–2017	Denso FC		
2017–2018	Pinerolo		
2018–2020	US Villar Perosa		
2020–2021	ASD Cavour Calcio		
Total		215	(64)

International career
2004–2005	Italy U17	7	(0)
- * Club domestic league appearances and goals

Marco Dalla Costa (born 25 March 1988) is an Italian former footballer who plays as a forward.

== Club career ==
=== Youth career ===
Born in Pinerolo, the Province of Turin (Torino), Dalla Costa was signed by F.C. Internazionale Milano in mid-2003. In the 2005–06 season, he was a member of Berretti under-18 team (B team of age under-20). He scored 7 goals in the regular season.

=== Lega Pro clubs ===
In mid-2006 he was loaned to Pro Sesto along with Nicola Redomi, Daniele Federici, Alessandro Brioschi, Alessio Colombo, Alessandro Mosca and Luca Palazzo (co-ownership), all born in 1988, as Inter no longer operated its Berretti U-19 team as a feeder team of Primavera, and they failed to compete into that main team.

Dalla Costa made his first team debut during the season. In January 2007 Inter sold half of the registration rights to Pro Sesto for a fee of €500 (Federici also sold for €500), and Pro Sesto striker Aiman Napoli joined Inter in exchange for €70,000. In 2007–08 Serie C1 he played 15 times. Dalla Costa then spent 2008–09 season at Seconda Divisione (ex- Serie C2) side Sangiovannese, which he mainly as a substitute.

The co-ownership was renewed in June 2007, 2008 and again in 2009. Pro Sesto sold its 50% rights to fellow Seconda Divisione club Olbia in mid-2009 (Pro Sesto relegated in 2009). However, he returned to Sesto San Giovanni in January 2010. In 2009–10 he only played 10 times in total. In June 2010, Inter gave up the remaining 50% rights to Olbia. However, the Commissione di Vigilanza sulle Società di Calcio Professionistiche (Co.Vi.So.C.) of FIGC refused to issue a new license for Olbia at the end of the season, and thus folded.

=== Serie D ===
Dalla Costa then moved to Serie D (non-professional/regional) team Caratese in 2010–11 season.

=== Novara ===
In March 2011, he signed a pre-contract with Serie B team Novara Calcio to join the club at the end of the season. The Serie D club located in Lombardy also became the satellite club of Piedmontese club Novara in July 2011. Novara promoted in June, and in August 2011, he was loaned to the Seconda Divisione team Pro Patria. On 31 January 2012, he was exchanged with Riccardo Capogna.

=== Serie D champion ===
On 15 June 2012, he was signed by Serie D newcomer Bra. The team was from the home region of Dalla Costa, in the Province of Cuneo, Piedmont. The team was promoted as the group A winner.

== International career ==
Dalla Costa had played for the Italy youth team at the 2005 FIFA U-17 World Championship (2 matches) and the 2005 UEFA European Under-17 Football Championship (3 matches).

== Honours ==
Bra

- Serie D: 2013
