= Alessandro Alessandrì =

Italian footballer (born 1979)

Personal information
- Date of birth: 30 August 1979 (age 47)
- Place of birth: Galatina, Italy
- Height: 1.63 m (5 ft 4 in)
- Position: Midfielder

Youth career
- 1994–1998: Internazioale

Senior career*
Years	Team	Apps	(Gls)
1998–2001	Internazionale	0	(0)
1998–1999	→ Castel di Sangro (loan)	2	(0)
2000	→ Sanremese (loan)	13	(0)
2000	→ Viareggio (loan)	1	(0)
2000–2001	→ Tricase (loan)	27	(0)
2001–2002	Brindisi	32	(6)
2002–2003	Nardò	31	(3)
2003–2007	Lamezia	126	(26)
2007–2008	Cisco Roma	29	(0)
2008–2009	Gela	26	(0)
2009–2011	Brindisi	32	(2)
2011	Isernia	11	(1)
2011–2012	Pomigliano		

International career
1995	Italy U15	7	(1)
- * Club domestic league appearances and goals

Alessandro Alessandrì (born 30 August 1979) is an Italian former footballer who played as a midfielder.

== Club career ==
Born in Galatina, Alessandro Alessandrì is from a near town, Martano, southern Apulia. He started his career at one of the northern giant Internazionale.

He left for clubs in Serie C1 and Serie C2 on loan, likes Castel di Sangro, Sanremese, Viareggio (along with Roman Miranda) and Tricase until 2001. He then played at semi-professional level for Serie D side Brindisi and Nardò until settled at Lamezia where he won Serie D runner-up and promotion playoffs. He played 126 league appearances and scored 26 goals before left for league rival Cisco Roma. In 2008, he was signed by league rival Gela and in 2009 by Apulia team Brindisi.

After Brindisi relegated, he joined Serie D club Isernia. In December, he left for Pomigliano.
