= Simone Pasa =

Italian footballer

Personal information
- Date of birth: 21 January 1994 (age 32)
- Place of birth: Montebelluna, Italy
- Height: 1.85 m (6 ft 1 in)
- Position: Defender

Team information
- Current team: San Marino

Youth career
- 2007–2013: Internazionale

Senior career*
Years	Team	Apps	(Gls)
2012–2016	Internazionale	4	(0)
2013–2014	→ Varese (loan)	1	(0)
2014	→ Padova (loan)	3	(0)
2014–2015	→ Prato (loan)	19	(1)
2015–2016	→ Pordenone (loan)	32	(2)
2016–2019	Cittadella	68	(1)
2019–2022	Pordenone	61	(0)
2022–2023	Rimini	34	(0)
2024	Montebelluna	1	(0)
2024–	San Marino	6	(0)

International career^{‡}
2009–2010	Italy U16	3	(1)
2010–2011	Italy U17	10	(0)
2011–2012	Italy U18	10	(2)
2012–2013	Italy U19	11	(0)
- * Club domestic league appearances and goals as of 17 November 2024 ‡ National team caps and goals as of 15 December 2013

Simone Pasa (born 21 January 1994) is an Italian footballer who plays as a defender for Sammarinese club San Marino in the Italian Serie D.

== Career ==
=== Internazionale and loans ===
Pasa made his debut in the Europa League on 6 December 2012 against Neftchi Baku. His first game in Serie A was on 12 May 2013 with Internazionale, in a scoreless draw away to Genoa, playing the whole 90 minutes.

On 9 July 2014, Pasa was signed by A.C. Prato in a temporary deal.

On 26 August 2015, he was signed by Pordenone in a temporary deal.

=== Cittadella ===
On 1 July 2016, Pasa was signed by Serie B club Cittadella on a free transfer.

=== Pordenone ===
On 12 August 2019, he returned to Pordenone, which was promoted to Serie B. He signed a 2-year contract.

=== Rimini ===
On 18 July 2022, Pasa signed a two-year contract with Rimini.
