= Jacopo Fortunato =

Italian footballer

Personal information
- Date of birth: 31 January 1990 (age 36)
- Place of birth: Bergamo, Italy
- Height: 1.81 m (5 ft 11 1/2 in)
- Position: Midfielder

Team information
- Current team: San Donà

Youth career
- Treviso
- 2008–2010: Internazionale

Senior career*
Years	Team	Apps	(Gls)
2010–2012	Internazionale	0	(0)
2010–2011	→ Como (loan)	16	(2)
2011–2012	→ SPAL (loan)	17	(3)
2012–2013	Treviso	26	(2)
2013–2015	Mantova	25	(2)
2015	Pordenone	16	(1)
2016	Chieri	15	(4)
2016–2017	Delta Rovigo	27	(7)
2017–2018	Reggina	27	(1)
2018–2019	Cesena	21	(6)
2019	Seregno	11	(1)
2019–2020	Trento		
2020–	San Donà		

International career
2009	Italy U20	1	(0)
- * Club domestic league appearances and goals as of 18:35, 13 April 2020 (UTC)

Jacopo Fortunato (born 31 January 1990) is an Italian footballer who plays as a midfielder for San Donà.

== Career ==
=== Internazionale ===
Fortunato joined Lombard club Internazionale along with Riccardo Bocalon in January 2008 from Veneto club Treviso for a total of €900,000 in co-ownership deals. In June 2008, Inter bought the remaining 50% registration rights of both players for a total of €900,000.

With the reserve team of Inter — the Primavera team, Fortunato usually played as a central midfielder in the 442 formation, or one of the 3 midfielders in the 433 formation. He also played twice for Inter first team in friendlies, both during the international break, during which the team fielded players without international duty and Primavera team players in the friendlies .

In July 2010, he was signed by Lega Pro Prima Divisione club Como from Inter along with Paolo Tornaghi and Simone Fautario. He played every match from round 1 to 10, and scored 2 goals in his debut match, a 3-1 win in the 2010–11 Coppa Italia. Fortunato played various position in the midfield, as central midfielder in 433 formation, an attacking midfielder in 4231/4312 formation, a left midfielder in 433 formation or a right midfielder in 343 formation. He was injured in mid-season and missed the rest of the season.

On 31 August 2011 Fortunato was loaned to SPAL.

=== Lega Pro ===
On 1 July 2012, Fortunato became a free agent after 4 1/2 years with Inter. Inter got nothing from its €900,000 investment. On 24 July 2012 Fortunato was re-signed by Treviso (now run as new company FC Treviso srl) The club folded again in 2013 after finishing last in the third division. On 5 July 2013 Fortunato joined Lega Pro Seconda Divisione club Mantova F.C. On 15 January 2015 Fortunato was signed by Pordenone in a 6-month contract.

In July 2018, he moved to Pineto in the Serie D.

=== Seregno ===
Ahead of the 2019/20 season, Fortunato joined U.S.D. 1913 Seregno Calcio.

=== Trento ===
On 5 December 2019, Trento announced the signing of Fortunato.

=== San Donà ===
In 2020, Fortunato moved to San Donà, where he became team captain.

== Honours ==
Inter Primavera

- Campionato Nazionale Primavera Runner-up: 2008
