= Giuseppe De Luca (footballer) =

Italian footballer

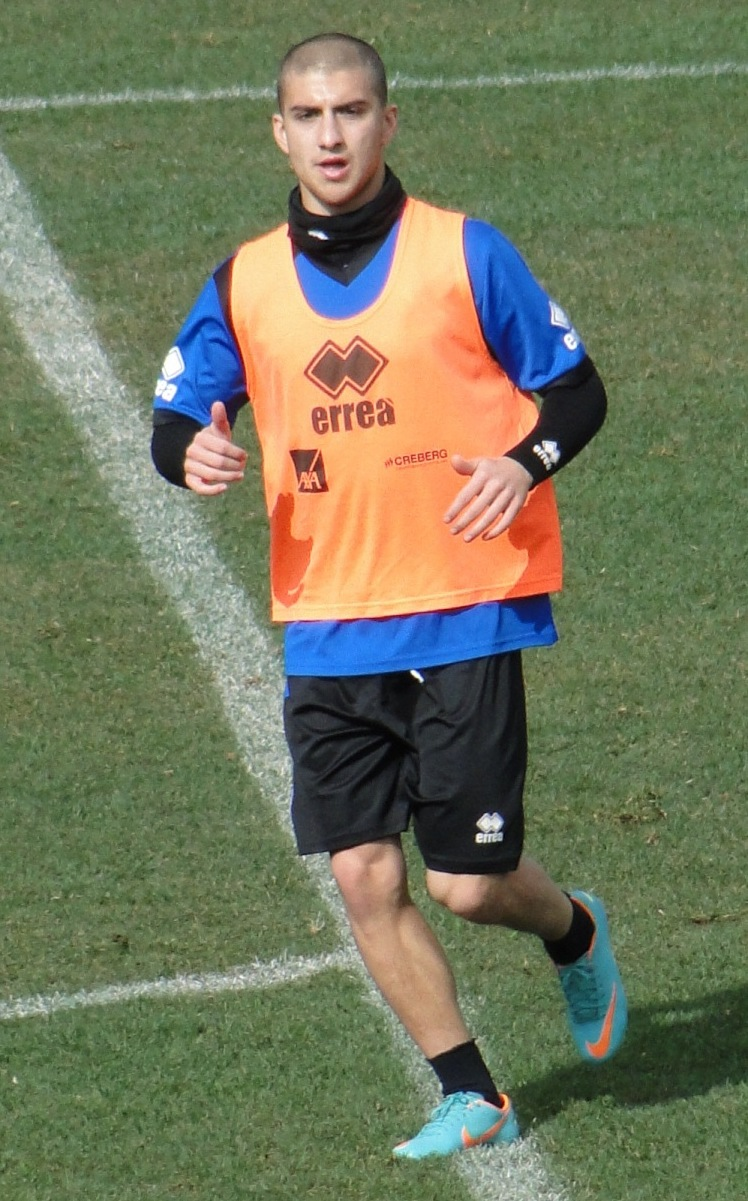
- De Luca with Atalanta in 2013

Personal information
- Date of birth: 11 October 1991 (age 35)
- Place of birth: Angera, Italy
- Height: 1.68 m (5 ft 6 in)
- Position: Forward

Team information
- Current team: Pompei

Youth career
- Varese

Senior career*
Years	Team	Apps	(Gls)
2011–2013	Varese	49	(13)
2012–2013	→ Atalanta (loan)	18	(2)
2013–2018	Atalanta	17	(4)
2014–2017	→ Bari (loan)	92	(17)
2017	→ Vicenza (loan)	17	(4)
2017–2018	→ Virtus Entella (loan)	37	(7)
2018–2021	Virtus Entella	70	(13)
2018–2019	→ CFR Cluj (loan)	3	(0)
2021–2022	Triestina	26	(4)
2022–2024	Catania	39	(8)
2024	→ Pergolettese (loan)	7	(0)
2024–	Pompei	1	(0)

International career
2011–2012	Italy U20	7	(2)
2011	Italy U21 Serie B	2	(1)
2012	Italy U21	4	(2)
- * Club domestic league appearances and goals as of 29 September 2024

Giuseppe De Luca (born 11 October 1991) is an Italian professional footballer who plays as a forward for Serie D club Pompei.

== Club career ==
De Luca began the youth career in Varese. He was the joint-top-scorer in 2011 Viareggio Youth Cup, along with Internazionale's Simone Dell'Agnello. He made his first team debut in a friendly match. Since then he played 4 Serie B matches and scored 1 goal. He then became one of Varese's key players in the two following campaigns.

On 30 August 2012, De Luca joined Atalanta on loan for the 2012–13 Serie A season. As part of the deal, Atalanta's Moussa Koné moved in the opposite direction. He made his Serie A debut on 18 September, against Milan. His top flight goal came on 4 November, the last of a 2–1 away win over Sampdoria. He appeared regularly for La Dea, mainly as a backup to Germán Denis.

On 18 June 2013, Atalanta decided to buy him outright and activated the buyout clause in the loan deal. He went loaned to Serie B side Bari along with a teammate Matteo Contini on 20 July 2014.

On 7 July 2018, he joined Romanian club CFR Cluj on loan from Virtus Entella, who bought out his rights from Atalanta following the conclusion of the 2017–18 season.

On 26 July 2021, he joined Serie C club Triestina.

On 19 January 2024, De Luca moved on loan to Pergolettese.

== International career ==
De Luca played once for the Italy under-21 Serie B representative team in 2010–11 season, scored a goal. He also played twice for the U20 national team in 2010–11 season.

In 2011–12 season De Luca played once for Italy U21 Serie B team in October. On 9 November 2011, he scored one goal for Italy U20 in a 3–0 victory over Ghana. He also started the next match, the fifth game of Four Nations Tournament against Switzerland; the unofficial friendly against "U21 Serie B team" in December 2011; against Macedonia in January 2012; 6th match of Four Nations, against Germany in February 2012 and in April 2012 against Denmark.

In April 2012 De Luca received his first formal U21 call-up, De Luca already received a call-up to training camp in March (which he played the practice match against Frosinone.). Ciro Ferrara made an experimental squad without U21 regular. After 2 players withdrew, the team did not have Serie A players, but three players from the reserve team of the Serie A club and 16 Serie B players. Despite inferior, Italy won Scotland 4–1. De Luca played the match as the substitute of Nicola Sansone.

== Honours ==
=== Club ===
CFR Cluj

- Liga I: 2018–19
- Supercupa României: 2018
