= Riccardo Ramazzotti =

Italian footballer

Personal information
- Date of birth: 7 August 1979 (age 47)
- Place of birth: Frascati, Italy
- Height: 1.80 m (5 ft 11 in)
- Position: Forward

Senior career*
Years	Team	Apps	(Gls)
1997–1998	Internazionale	0	(0)
1998–1999	Pistoiese	3	(0)
1999–2000	Spezia	3	(0)
2000	Viareggio	6	(0)
2000–2001	Internazionale	0	(0)
2001–2003	Gubbio	10	(1)
2003	Cattolica	2	(0)
2003–2004	Spoleto	4	(2)
2004–2005	Cecchina	20	(10)
2005–2006	Bastia	14	(7)
2006–2008	Gualdo	50	(34)
2008–2009	Valfabbrica	33	(15)
2009–2010	Gualdo	32	(12)
- * Club domestic league appearances and goals

Riccardo Ramazzotti (born 7 August 1979) is an Italian former footballer who played as a forward.

== Appearances on Italian Series ==
Serie A : 0 Apps

Serie C1 : 6 Apps

Serie C2 : 16 Apps, 1 Goal

Serie D : 2 Apps

Eccellenza : 107 Apps, 46 Goals

Promozione : 29 Apps, 27 Goals

Total : 160 Apps, 74 Goals
