= Andrea Scrugli =

Italian footballer (born 1992)

Personal information
- Date of birth: 25 July 1992 (age 34)
- Place of birth: Tropea, Italy
- Height: 1.81 m (5 ft 11 in)
- Position: Defender

Team information
- Current team: Nocerina

Youth career
- Vibonese

Senior career*
Years	Team	Apps	(Gls)
2009–2011	Vibonese	24	(0)
2009–2010	→ Benevento (loan)	1	(0)
2011–2012	Prato	9	(0)
2012–2013	Andria	17	(0)
2013–2014	L'Aquila	21	(0)
2014–2015	Pescara	0	(0)
2014–2015	→ L'Aquila (loan)	28	(1)
2015–2018	Akragas	42	(0)
2018–2019	Trapani	26	(0)
2019–2020	Triestina	16	(0)
2020–2021	Sambenedettese	18	(0)
2022-	Nocerina	13	(2)
- * Club domestic league appearances and goals as of 2 May 2022

Andrea Scrugli (born 25 July 1992) is an Italian footballer.

== Biography ==
Born in Tropea, Calabria, Scrugli spent 5 seasons with 5 different Lega Pro clubs, namely Benevento, Prato, Andria and L'Aquila from the Prime Division and Vibonese from the Second Division, from 2009 to 2014.

Scrugli had played 10 times for Prato, including once in the cup. Scrugli played his last match for Prato in 2012 pre-season friendly.

=== Pescara ===
On 2 July 2014 he was signed by fellow Abruzzese club Pescara, from L'Aquila on a free transfer. Scrugli made his official debut for Pescara in 2014–15 Coppa Italia, against Renate. In the next match Fabrizio Grillo became the starting left back. Circa September 2014 Scrugli was re-signed by L'Aquila in a temporary deal. Scrugli wore no.25 shirt and 19 shirt respectively in 2014–15 and 2015–16 season.

=== Akragas ===
On 20 August 2015 Scrugli was signed by Lega Pro newcomer Akragas from the Serie B side Pescara.

=== Trapani ===
On 5 September 2018, he signed with Serie C club Trapani on a one-year contract.

=== Triestina ===
On 14 July 2019, he joined Triestina, signing a one-year contract with an additional one-year extension option.

=== Sambenedettese ===
On 27 August 2020, he moved to Sambenedettese.
