= Enrico Alfonso =

Italian footballer (born 1988)

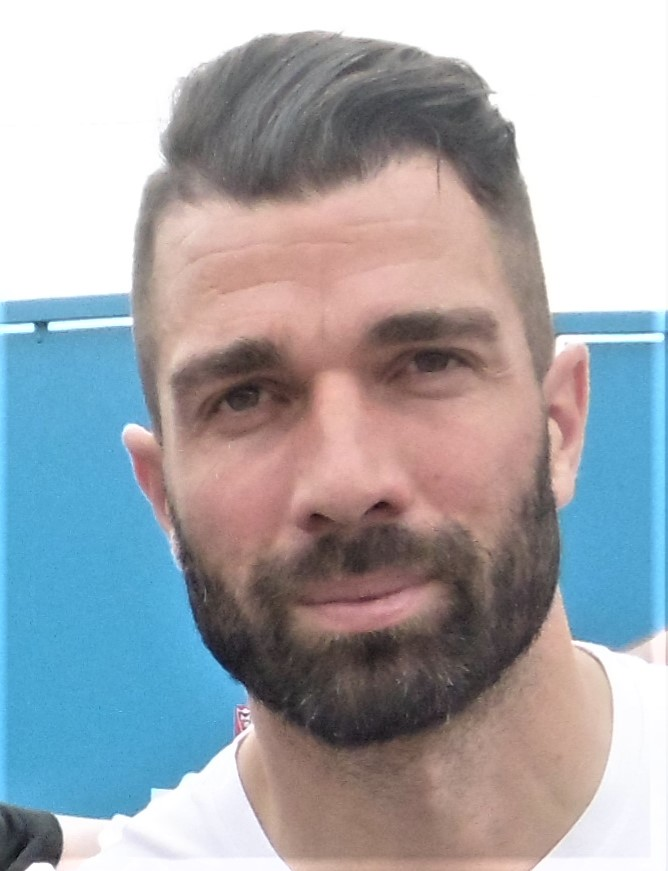

Personal information
- Date of birth: 4 May 1988 (age 38)
- Place of birth: Padua, Italy
- Height: 1.91 m (6 ft 3 in)
- Position: Goalkeeper

Team information
- Current team: Virtus Verona
- Number: 2

Youth career
- 1994–1998: U.S. Alte Ceccato
- 1998–2003: Montecchio Maggiore
- 2003–2005: Chievo

Senior career*
Years	Team	Apps	(Gls)
2005–2006	Chievo	0	(0)
2006–2007	→ Pizzighettone (loan)	9	(0)
2007–2008	Internazionale	0	(0)
2008	→ Venezia (loan)	7	(0)
2008–2009	→ Pisa (loan)	9	(0)
2009–2011	→ Modena (loan)	37	(0)
2011–2013	Cremonese	42	(0)
2013–2014	Vicenza	8	(0)
2014–2015	Pro Piacenza	34	(0)
2015–2018	Cittadella	104	(0)
2018–2020	Brescia	34	(0)
2020–2022	Cremonese	8	(0)
2022–2025	SPAL	62	(0)
2024–2025	→ Virtus Verona (loan)	13	(0)
2025–	Virtus Verona	22	(0)

International career
2003	Italy U15	4	(0)
2003–2004	Italy U16	14	(0)
2004–2005	Italy U17	4	(0)
2006	Italy U19	1	(0)
2007–2008	Italy U20	3	(0)
2008	Italy U23	2	(0)
- * Club domestic league appearances and goals as of 30 April 2026

Enrico Alfonso (born 4 May 1988) is an Italian professional footballer who plays as a goalkeeper for Serie D club Virtus Verona.

== Club career ==
=== Early career ===
Aged only 6 years old, Alfonso began his playing career with Alte di Montecchio. He spent 4 years with the club, before moving for one season at Montecchio Maggiore at the age of 10.

After that season, Alfonso joined Chievo's Giovanissimi. He was sent on loan to Pizzighettone of Serie C1 in summer 2006. He competed with Alex Cordaz for first choice until Cordaz ended his loan.

=== Inter Milan ===
On 27 August 2007, he joined Inter Milan on co-ownership deal, for €1.9 million, signing a five-year deal with the club. He replaced Fabián Carini, who left for Real Murcia, as fourth goalkeeper (but in the UEFA Champions League the 4th keeper was Paolo Tornaghi). He took the number 71 shirt, which was previously owned by Cordaz.

On 17 January 2008 Alfonso made his debut against Reggina in the Coppa Italia. In the match he was forced to make two good saves, keeping a clean sheet to help Inter win 3–0 (7–1 on aggregate).

In January 2008 Alfonso was loaned out to Venezia until the end of the 2007–08 season.

Alfonso spent the 2008–09 season on loan to Serie B side Pisa. After Pisa's relegation to Lega Pro Prima Divisione, and ultimately its financial collapse, Internazionale secured a loan move to Modena for Alfonso for the 2009-10 Serie B season. In the next season he became the starting goalkeeper of Modena, playing 31 times.

In July 2011 he was transferred to Cremonese along with Michele Rigione and Riccardo Bocalon. They finished as the losing semi-finalists in the promotion playoffs.

On 21 June 2012, Inter bought Alfonso outright for €1.1 million, with Matteo Solini returning to Chievo, also for €1.1 million. In July 2012, he returned to Cremonese.

=== Lega Pro clubs ===
In late July 2013 Alfonso joined Vicenza as a trialist, in which he played as one of the starting keepers in the pre-season games. On 10 August 2013 Alfonso signed a 1-year contract with Vicenza, in Lega Pro . Alfonso immediately replaced Angelo Di Stasio as the starting keeper of Vicenza in competitive games, his debut being the second round of the 2013–14 Coppa Italia. He was the first choice in the match after, against Del Piero's Sydney FC. Vicenza were promoted back to Serie B in 2014 as a replacement of Siena, despite finished as a losing quarter-finalist in the 2014 promotion playoffs.

On 26 September 2014, Alfonso went to Pro Piacenza as a free agent.

On 16 July 2015, Alfonso was signed by A.S. Cittadella.

=== Return to Cremonese ===
On 26 August 2020 he returned to Cremonese.

=== SPAL ===
On 29 January 2022, he signed with SPAL until 30 June 2023.

=== Virtus Verona ===
On 6 August 2024, Alfonso moved on loan to Virtus Verona. On 3 February 2025, Virtus Verona made the transfer permanent.

== International career ==
Alfonso had been part of every minor Italy national football teams, from the under-15 to the under-21. He took part in 2005 UEFA European Under-17 Football Championship (in which he was sent off in the third match) and 2005 FIFA U-17 World Championship. He was not played in any match of 2007 UEFA European Under-19 Football Championship elite qualification and was rarely selected for the U-19 team.

On 5 September 2007, the round 1 of 2007–08 Four Nations Tournament, Alfonso played the whole match of Italy under-20 national team against Switzerland. Alfonso managed to hold a clean sheet, as the match ended in a goalless draw.

On 5 October 2007, Pierluigi Casiraghi called up Alfonso, along with teammate Francesco Bolzoni, to form part of the Italy national under-21 football team. The national side would be involved in the 2009 UEFA European Under-21 Football Championship qualification matches against Croatia and Greece. However, he did not play nor was he named on the bench. That season he only managed to play the third and sixth round of the Four Nations Tournament.

He was called up to the 2008 Toulon Tournament from Italy Olympic where he played two matches keeping one clean sheet, during the group stages, after Italy already qualified for the next round with a win. He was not selected to 2008 Olympics in August. Despite having still been eligible for the 2009–11 season, he did not receive any call-up.
