= Luca Moscatiello =

Italian footballer

Personal information
- Date of birth: 25 May 1991
- Place of birth: Italy
- Position(s): Midfielder

Senior career*
Years	Team	Apps	(Gls)
-2010	Fulham F.C.	0	(0)
2010-2011	A.C. Cesena	0	(0)
2011-2012	A.S.D. Trezzano Calcio		
- FC Mendrisio-Stabio
2013/2014	KF Teuta Durrës	1	(0)
- FC Mendrisio-Stabio
- US Arbedo
- FC Mendrisio-Stabio
-2019	FC Thalwil		
2019	S.S.D. Pro Sesto		
2019/2020	U.S. Inveruno		
- *Club domestic league appearances and goals

Luca Moscatiello (born 25 May 1991 in Italy) is an Italian footballer.
