= Felice Natalino =

Italian footballer

Personal information
- Date of birth: 24 March 1992 (age 34)
- Place of birth: Lamezia Terme, Italy
- Height: 1.87 m (6 ft 1 1/2 in)
- Positions: Right back; centre-back

Youth career
- Crotone
- 2008–2009: Genoa
- 2008–2009: → Internazionale (loan)
- 2009–2011: Internazionale

Senior career*
Years	Team	Apps	(Gls)
2010–2012	Internazionale	2	(0)
2011–2012	→ Verona (loan)	0	(0)
2012	→ Crotone (loan)	8	(0)
Total		3	(0)

International career
2008	Italy U16	9	(0)
2008–2009	Italy U17	21	(0)
2009–2010	Italy U18	6	(0)
2010–2011	Italy U19	7	(0)
- * Club domestic league appearances and goals

Felice Natalino (born 24 March 1992) is an Italian former footballer who played as a defender.

== Club career ==
Natalino arrived Internazionale's youth system in August 2008 from Crotone via Genoa, il Grifone having signed him from Crotone just weeks earlier, for a cost of 628,293 €. From the 2009–10 season he was co-contracted by the two clubs, as Genoa sold half of the registration rights for €75,000. Before joining Crotone, he had also played a season for Virtus Sambiase, with the club eligible to receive 18,000 € from Inter after Natalino made his Serie A début.

Natalino was only included in the first team during the 2010–11 Serie A season due to an injury crisis. Natalino then made his competitive début for the first team on 28 November 2010, aged 18 years and 8 months, coming on for Davide Santon at half-time during a home league match against Parma, ended in a 5–2 win for Inter. Natalino was then inserted in the starting line-up by head coach Rafael Benítez in the next match against Lazio, that ended in a 3–1 defeat for the Nerazzurri. On 7 December, Natalino made his UEFA Champions League début against Werder Bremen, coming on in the second half for the captain Javier Zanetti who had suffered a knock. The game ended in a 3–0 defeat to Bremen.

Natalino went on loan during the 2011–12 season, as Inter youths often left the under-20 team a year earlier for senior football. However, Natalino only played once. In June 2012 Genoa transferred the remaining 50% registration rights to Inter for free.

In February 2013, Natalino underwent emergency surgery after suffering a heart attack. He had previously been diagnosed with an irregular heartbeat. In October of that year, he confirmed his retirement from football, having chosen not to risk putting undue strain on his heart by returning to the life of a professional sportsman.

== International career ==
Natalino was a member of the Italy U-16 national team in 2007–08 season. He also played for U17, U18 and U19 team. However, after he turned to play senior football he did not receive any call-up. Natalino was a member of 2009 UEFA European Under-17 Football Championship qualification which he played twice.

== Career statistics ==
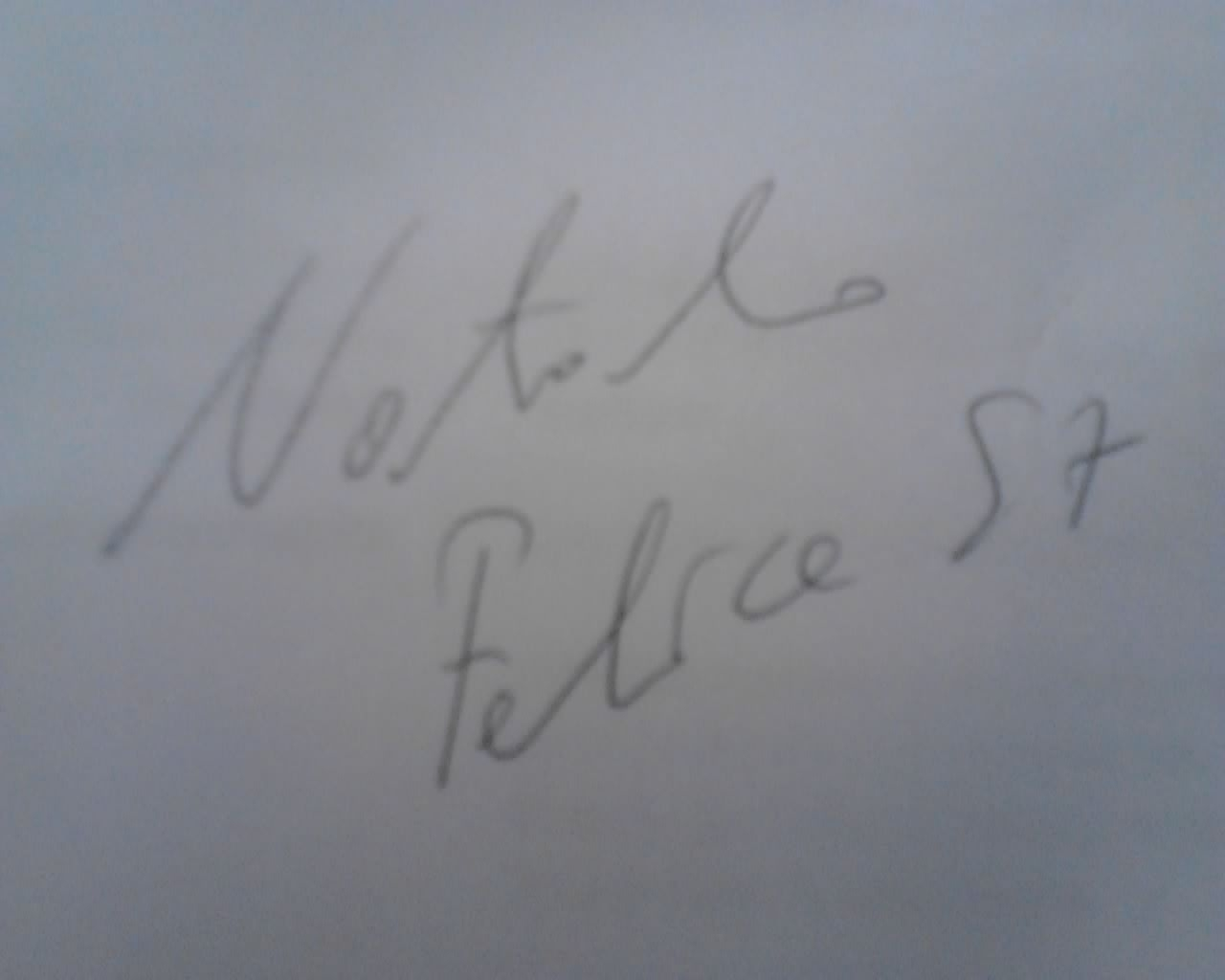
Natalino's autograph

As of 8 December 2010

Club	Season	League		Cup		Europe		Total	
Club	Season	Apps	Goals	Apps	Goals	Apps	Goals	Apps	Goals
Internazionale	2010–11	2	0	0	0	1	0	3	0
Career total		2	0	0	0	1	0	3	0
