= Giacomo Sciacca =

Italian footballer

Personal information
- Date of birth: 19 April 1996 (age 30)
- Place of birth: Desio, Italy
- Height: 1.80 m (5 ft 11 in)
- Positions: Centre-back; right-back

Team information
- Current team: AlbinoLeffe
- Number: 3

Youth career
- Inter Milan

Senior career*
Years	Team	Apps	(Gls)
2015–2017	Inter Milan	0	(0)
2015–2016	→ Renate (loan)	18	(0)
2016–2017	→ Piacenza (loan)	29	(1)
2017–2020	Alessandria	42	(2)
2018–2019	→ Imolese (loan)	33	(0)
2020–2021	Vibonese	31	(0)
2021–2023	Foggia	49	(1)
2023	Taranto	7	(0)
2023–2024	Casertana	28	(0)
2024–2026	Potenza	18	(0)
2026–	AlbinoLeffe	17	(1)

International career
2011–2012	Italy U16	10	(1)
2012–2013	Italy U17	18	(0)
2013–2014	Italy U18	5	(0)
2014–2015	Italy U19	7	(0)
2015–2016	Italy U20	3	(0)
- * Club domestic league appearances and goals as of 30 April 2026

Giacomo Sciacca (born 19 April 1996) is an Italian professional footballer who plays as a defender for Serie C Group A club AlbinoLeffe.

== Club career ==
Born in Desio, in the Province of Monza and Brianza (by-then part of the Province of Milan), Lombardy, to a father originally from Castelvetrano, Sciacca started his career at F.C. Internazionale Milano. On 21 July 2015, he was signed by Lega Pro club Renate. Sciacca made his professional debut on 14 August, in the first match of the 2015–16 Coppa Italia Lega Pro.

On 18 July 2016, he was loaned to Piacenza.

On 13 July 2017, Sciacca signed a three-year contract with Alessandria. In August 2018, he joined Imolese in a temporary deal.

On 4 October 2020, he joined Vibonese.

On 17 August 2021, he joined Foggia.

On 27 January 2023, Sciacca signed for Taranto until the end of the season.

== International career ==
Sciacca finished as the runner-up with Azzurrini in the 2013 UEFA European Under-17 Championship. The team finished as the losing side of the round of 16 in the 2013 FIFA U-17 World Cup. He was in the team that was eliminated from the Elite Round of 2015 UEFA European Under-19 Championship qualification.
