= Luca Stocchi =

Italian footballer

Personal information
- Date of birth: 20 May 1991 (age 35)
- Place of birth: Vizzolo Predabissi, Italy
- Position: Goalkeeper

Youth career
- ?–2004: Monza
- 2004–2005: A.C. Milan
- 2006–2010: Internazionale
- 2010–2011: Piacenza

Senior career*
Years	Team	Apps	(Gls)
2011–2012	Piacenza	3	(0)

International career
2008	Italy U18	0	(0)
- * Club domestic league appearances and goals

Luca Stocchi (born 20 May 1991) is an Italian footballer who plays as a goalkeeper.

== Career ==
Born in Vizzolo Predabissi, the Province of Milan, Stocchi started his career at Internazionale. In 2007–08 season he was promoted to the Allievi Nazionali U-17 team. He occasionally trained with the first team. Stocchi was promoted to Primavera team in 2008–09 season, as the backup of Slovenian Vid Belec. However Stocchi was also named as the fourth keeper in 2008–09 UEFA Champions League as List B member (U-21 youth product). It is because both Belec and Andrea Bavena were ineligible to List B and no room for them in List A main squad. After Belec was eligible to 2009–10 UEFA Champions League, Stocchi was removed from the B squad despite still remains eligible at that time. In January 2010 he left for Serie B club Piacenza along with Giuseppe Angarano. In July Piacenza signed Stocchi in co-ownership deal for a peppercorn fee of €500. Stocchi was the first choice of Piacenza's Primavera in the second half of 2009–10 season (played 10 out of 10 matches) but only played 12 times (out of possible 26 league matches) in 2010–11 season. The coach of the youth team preferred to train younger footballer Nicola Maggio instead.

Stocchi played three time for the first team in 2011–12 Lega Pro Prima Divisione, from round 18 to 20. He followed the team relegated to the third division after Inter gave up the remain 50% registration rights to Piacenza. He was the backup of Mario Cassano, however after the club suspension of Cassano, Francesco Monaco used Stocchi and then Mihail Ivanov as starting keeper.

== Honours ==
Inter youth

- Campionato Allievi Nazionali: 2008
