= Carlo Moscatiello =

Italian painter (1650–1739)

Carlo Moscatiello (1650–1739) was an Italian painter of the Baroque period, active near his natal city of Naples. He was active in quadratura.
