= Luca Caldirola =

Italian footballer (born 1991)

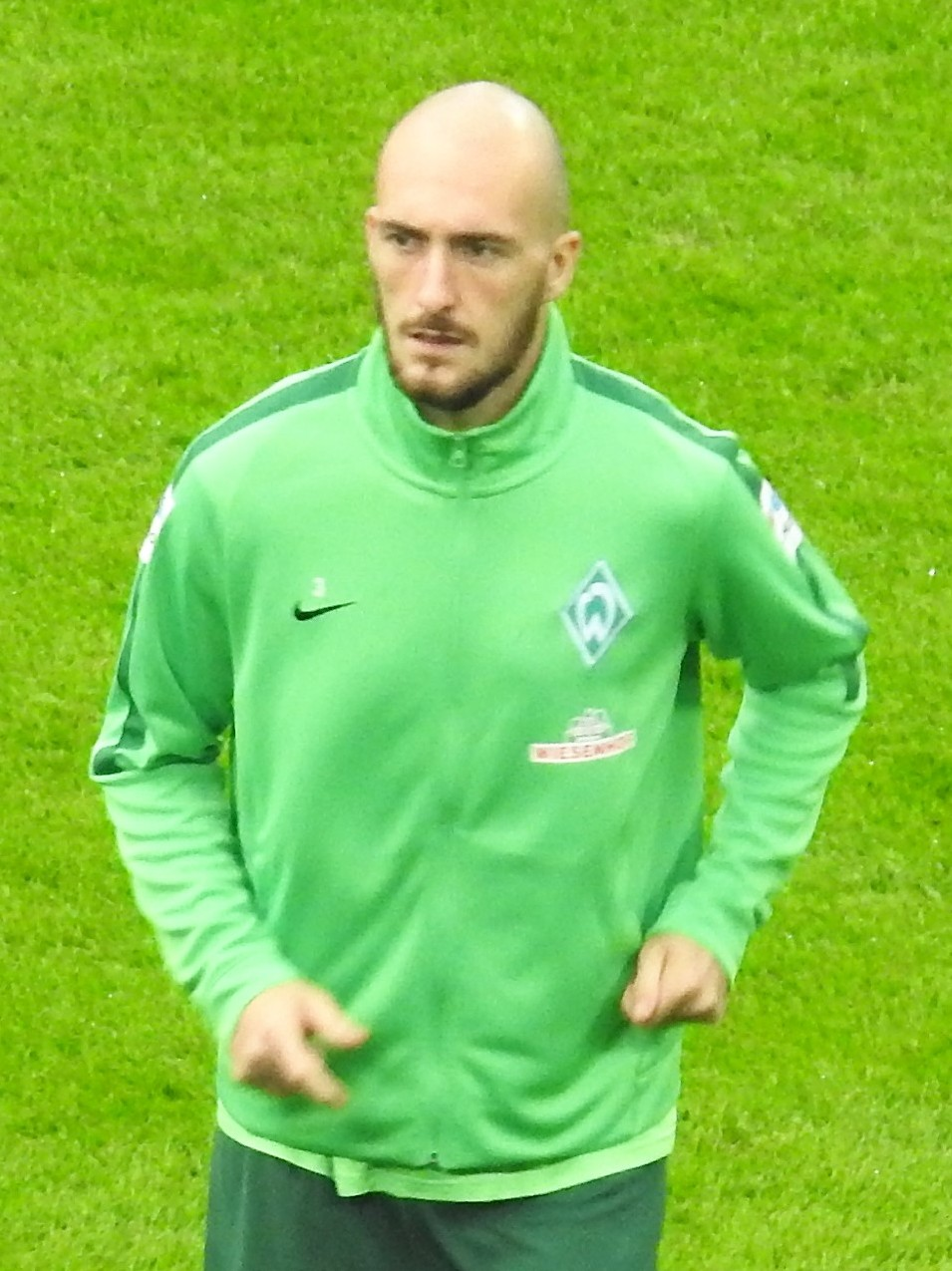
- Caldirola warming up for Werder Bremen in 2017

Personal information
- Date of birth: 1 February 1991 (age 35)
- Place of birth: Desio, Italy
- Height: 1.86 m (6 ft 1 in)
- Position: Defender

Team information
- Current team: Benevento
- Number: 33

Youth career
- 1995–1999: Base 96
- 1999–2010: Inter Milan

Senior career*
Years	Team	Apps	(Gls)
2010–2011	Inter Milan	0	(0)
2010–2011	→ Vitesse (loan)	11	(0)
2011–2013	Cesena	18	(0)
2011–2012	→ Inter Milan (loan)	0	(0)
2012–2013	→ Brescia (loan)	38	(0)
2013–2019	Werder Bremen	46	(1)
2015–2016	→ Darmstadt 98 (loan)	34	(0)
2017–2019	Werder Bremen II	3	(0)
2019–2021	Benevento	67	(8)
2021–2025	Monza	94	(3)
2025–2026	Folgore Caratese	12	(0)
2026–	Benevento	12	(0)

International career
2006–2007	Italy U16	14	(1)
2007–2008	Italy U17	9	(0)
2009	Italy U18	3	(0)
2009–2010	Italy U19	7	(0)
2010	Italy U20	1	(1)
2010–2013	Italy U21	31	(1)
- * Club domestic league appearances and goals as of 1 May 2026

Luca Caldirola (born 1 February 1991) is an Italian professional footballer who plays as a defender for Serie B club Benevento. Mainly a centre-back, he can also play as a left-back.

== Club career ==
=== Inter Milan ===
==== 2009–10 season ====
Caldirola started his career at Inter Milan, where he was the team captain at under-20 level (Primavera) and was occasionally called up to join the first team during the 2009–10 season, without making any appearances, however, on the pitch. Caldirola also played for various youth teams in Lombardy as goalkeeper and midfielder before joined Inter at the age of eight. He played in a friendly match for the Inter first team in 2009.

==== 2010–11 season ====
On 29 June 2010, Inter loaned out Caldirola to Dutch club Vitesse Arnhem of the Eredivisie for the entire 2010–11 season; he is the second Italian player to be part of the Arnhem club, after Marco De Marchi. Inter also reduced the age limit of its Primavera team to under-19 in 2010, keeping only three players born in 1991 in the 2010–11 season as back-ups for the first team.

Half of the registration rights of Caldirola — and Luca Garritano — were sold to Cesena as part of the deal that brought defender Yuto Nagatomo to the San Siro in June 2011, after a successful loan. Half of the registration rights of Caldirola was valued €2.5 million; Caldirola signed a four-year contract. Both Caldirola and Garritano returned to Inter in a temporary deal for the 2011–12 season.

==== 2011–12 season ====
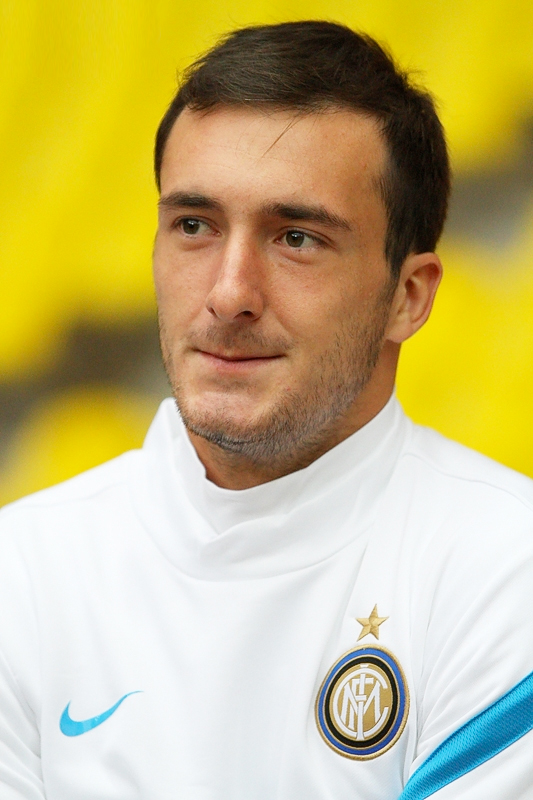
Caldirola with Inter Milan in the late 2011

On 7 December 2011, Caldirola made his first team debut for Inter in a UEFA Champions League group stage match against CSKA Moscow which ended in a 2–1 loss at San Siro.

On 4 January 2012, Inter confirmed that Caldirola signed a loan deal until the end of the season with the Serie B outfit Brescia.

==== 2012–13 season ====
In June 2012, the co-ownership deal was renewed and Caldirola reported to Cesena in pre-season on 10 July 2012, where he played the first half of the season for the Romagna club before again being loaned to Brescia in January 2013, where he finished the campaign with 15 league appearances.

In June 2013 Inter bought back Caldirola for €2.5 million, with Riccardo Melgrati and Thomas Pedrabissi moved to Cesena outright for €750,000 and €1 million respectively; Cesena also signed Yago Del Piero in co-ownership deal for €250,000, thus the deals only involves €500,000 cash to Cesena.

=== Werder Bremen ===
On 26 June 2013, SV Werder Bremen confirmed the signing of Luca Caldirola from Inter on a four-year contract, for a €2.5 million transfer fee.

He missed most of the 2016–17 season due to injuries. With his contract running out at the end of the month, he agreed to a two-year contract extension on 15 June 2017.

After an envisaged transfer away from the club did not materialise in summer 2018, Caldirola trained with Werder Bremen's reserves in the first half of the 2018–19 season.

==== Darmstadt 98 (loan) ====
On 15 July 2015, Caldirola was loaned out for a season to SV Darmstadt 98.

=== Benevento ===
On 30 January 2019, Caldirola joined Italian Serie B side Benevento on a free transfer, returning to Italy after five years.

=== Monza ===
On 17 July 2021, Caldirola moved to Monza in the Serie B on a two-year contract.

== International career ==
Caldirola has represented his native country of Italy at all youth levels, from under-16 to under-20.

On 17 November 2010, he made his debut with the Italy under-21 team in a friendly match against Turkey in a 2–1 victory played in Fermo.

In 2009, he participated at the UEFA Under-19 Championship with the Italians.

In May 2011, he was called-on by Ciro Ferrara to play the games of the 2011 Toulon Tournament. Under the management of Devis Mangia, in 2012, Caldirola was named captain of the under-21 side, where he led the Azzurini in the 2013 UEFA European Under-21 Football Championship.

== Career statistics ==
=== Club ===
As of match played 24 May 2025

Appearances and goals by club, season and competition
Club	Season	League			National cup (Note: Includes Coppa Italia, DFB-Pokal)		Continental		Other		Total	
Club	Season	Division	Apps	Goals	Apps	Goals	Apps	Goals	Apps	Goals	Apps	Goals
Vitesse	2010–11	Eredivisie	11	0	—		—		—		11	0
Inter Milan	2011–12	Serie A	—		—		1 (Note: Appearance in UEFA Champions League)	0	—		1	0
Brescia	2011–12	Serie B	19	0	—		—		—		19	0
Cesena	2012–13	Serie B	18	0	1	0	—		—		19	0
Brescia	2012–13	Serie B	19	0	—		—		—		19	0
Werder Bremen	2013–14	Bundesliga	33	0	1	0	—		—		34	0
Werder Bremen	2014–15	Bundesliga	7	1	1	0	—		—		8	1
Werder Bremen	2016–17	Bundesliga	5	0	0	0	—		—		5	0
Werder Bremen	2017–18	Bundesliga	1	0	0	0	—		—		1	0
Werder Bremen	Total		46	1	2	0	0	0	0	0	48	1
Darmstadt 98 (loan)	2015–16	Bundesliga	34	0	2	0	—		—		36	0
Werder Bremen II	2016–17	3. Liga	2	0	—		—		—		2	0
Werder Bremen II	2017–18	3. Liga	1	0	—		—		—		1	0
Werder Bremen II	Total		3	0	0	0	0	0	0	0	3	0
Benevento	2018–19	Serie B	16	3	0	0	—		—		16	3
Benevento	2019–20	Serie B	33	3	1	0	—		—		10	3
Benevento	2020–21	Serie A	18	2	0	0	—		—		18	2
Benevento	Total		67	8	1	0	0	0	0	0	68	8
Monza	2021–22	Serie B	24	0	1	0	—		3	0	28	0
Monza	2022–23	Serie A	27	2	0	0	—		—		27	2
Monza	2023–24	Serie A	29	1	1	0	—		—		30	1
Monza	2024–25	Serie A	14	0	3	0	—		—		17	0
Monza	Total		94	3	5	0	0	0	3	0	102	3
Career total			311	12	11	0	1	0	3	0	326	12
