= Daniele Federici =

Italian former footballer (born 1988)

Personal information
- Full name: Daniele Federici
- Date of birth: 11 February 1988 (age 38)
- Place of birth: Tarquinia, Italy
- Height: 1.82 m (5 ft 11 1/2 in)
- Position: Left back

Youth career
- 1997–2002: Corneto
- 2002–2006: Internazionale
- 2006–2007: Pro Sesto
- 2007–2008: Internazionale

Senior career*
Years	Team	Apps	(Gls)
2008–2012	Grosseto	57	(2)
2012	Frosinone	14	(1)
- * Club domestic league appearances and goals

Daniele Federici (born 11 February 1988) is an Italian former footballer who played as a defender.

== Career ==
Federici started his career at Internazionale. He left for Pro Sesto in 2006 on loan with option to purchase. In January Pro Sesto excised the option for a peppercorn fee of €500. In July 2007 Federici returned to Inter. In July 2008, he was farmed to Grosseto on joint-ownership deal from Inter. He played 17 games in Serie B. He also played 1 games for Grosseto at promotion playoff.

In January 2012 Federici was signed by Frosinone in 1 1/2-year contract.

In July 2012 Federici retired from professional football.
