= List of Italian football transfers winter 2009–10 =

This is a list of Italian football transfers for the 2009–10 season. Only moves from Serie A and Serie B are listed.

The winter transfer window will open for 4 weeks. Players without a club may join one, either during or in between transfer windows.

== Winter transfer window ==
Date	Name	Nat	Moving from	Moving to	Fee
2009-10-09	César	Brazil	Bologna	Valle del Giovenco	Free
2009-10-18	Abderrazzak Jadid	Morocco	Brescia	Salernitana	Free
2009-10-20	Gianmarco Cavalieri	Italy	Parma	Varese	Free
2009-10-29^{1}	Andrea Capone	Italy	Vicenza	Salernitana	Free
2009-11-01	Stephen Appiah	Ghana	Unattached	Bologna	Free
2009-11-01^{1}	Dominic Adiyiah	Ghana	(Norway) Fredrikstad	Milan	Undisclosed
2009-11-02^{1}	David Beckham	England	(United States) LA Galaxy	Milan	Loan
2009–11-02	Ivan Franceschini	Italy	Torino	Cesena	Free
2009-11-04	Lorenzo Stovini	Italy	Catania	Empoli	Free
2009-11-09	Natale Gonnella	Italy	Grosseto	Como	Free
2009-11-10	Andrea Zanigni	Italy	Cesena	Voghera	Free
2009-11-12	Roberto Stellone	Italy	Torino	Frosinone	Free
2009-11-26^{1}	Javier Chevantón	Uruguay	(Spain) Sevilla	Atalanta	Loan
2009-12-08	Mark Edusei	Ghana	Bari	(Switzerland) Bellinzona	Free
2009-12-09	Mirko Guadalupi	Italy	Siena	Viareggio	Loan
2009-12-14	Giuseppe Colucci	Italy	Chievo	Cesena	Free
2009-12-15	Roberto Cortese	Italy	Nissa	Chievo	Undisclosed
2009-12-18	Jo Inge Berget	Norway	Udinese	(Norway) Strømsgodset	Loan
18 December 2009	Mateo Figoli	Uruguay	Triestina	(Mexico) León	€50,000
2009-12-21	Pajtim Kasami	Switzerland	Lazio	(Switzerland) Bellinzona	Free
2009-12-22^{1}	Manuel Fischnaller	Italy	Südtirol	Juventus	Loan
2009-12-27	Miguel Layún	Mexico	Atalanta	(Mexico) Club América	Loan
2009-12-29^{2}	David Suazo	Honduras	Internazionale	Genoa	Loan
2009-12-30^{1}	Simone Pesce	Italy	Catania	Ascoli	Loan
2009-12-30^{1}	Carl Valeri	Australia	Grosseto	Sassuolo	Co-ownership, €300K
2009-12-31^{1}	Luca Toni	Italy	(Germany) Bayern Munich	Roma	Loan
2010-01-02	Felipe	Brazil	Udinese	Fiorentina	Loan
2010-01-02	Piá	Brazil	Napoli	Torino	Loan
2010-01-02	Vitorino Antunes	Portugal	Roma	(Portugal) Leixões	Loan
2010-01-02	Lorenzo Ariaudo	Italy	Juventus	Cagliari	Loan, €500K
2010-01-02	Ritchie Kitoko	Belgium	Udinese	(Spain) Granada	Loan
2010-01-03	Leandro Greco	Italy	Roma	Piacenza	Loan
2010-01-03	Iacopo Balestri	Italy	Mantova	Salernitana	Free
2010-01-04	Goran Pandev	Macedonia	Lazio	Internazionale	Free
2010-01-04	Andrea Bertolacci	Italy	Roma	Lecce	Loan
2010-01-04	Sergio Floccari	Italy	Genoa	Lazio	Loan
2010-01-04	Emílson Sánchez Cribari	Brazil	Lazio	Siena	Loan
2010-01-04	Matteo Chinellato	Italy	Fiorentina (youth)	Genoa (youth)	Free
2010-01-04	Roberto Cortese	Italy	Chievo	Taranto	Loan
2010-01-04	Ivan Rajčić	Croatia	Bari	Taranto	Loan
2010-01-05	Giuseppe Gemiti	Germany	Modena	Novara	Free
2010-01-05	Victor	Brazil	Unattached	Frosinone	Free
2010-01-05	Cristian Molinaro	Italy	Juventus	(Germany) Stuttgart	Loan, €500K
2010-01-05	Massimiliano Carlini	Italy	Frosinone	Sorrento	Loan
5 January 2010	Davide Sinigaglia	Italy	Cesena	Lanciano	Loan
2010-01-06	Salvatore Foti	Italy	Sampdoria	Piacenza	Loan
2010-01-06	Marius Stankevičius	Lithuania	Sampdoria	(Spain) Sevilla	Loan
2010-01-06	Diogo Tavares	Portugal	Frosinone	Pergocrema	Loan
2010-01-07	Eliseu	Portugal	Lazio	(Spain) Zaragoza	Loan
2010-01-08	Jani Tapani Virtanen	Finland	Udinese	(Finland) TPS	Undisclosed
2010-01-08	Patrick Vieira	France	Internazionale	(England) Manchester City	Free
2010-01-08	Andrea Dossena	Italy	(England) Liverpool	Napoli	€4.25M
2010-01-08	Tiago	Portugal	Juventus	(Spain) Atlético Madrid	Loan
2010-01-08	Cris Gilioli	Italy	Modena	Cremonese	Loan
2010-01-08	Dieter Elsneg	Austria	Frosinone	Sampdoria	Loan
2010-01-08	Jefferson	Brazil	Fiorentina	Cassino	Loan
8 January 2010	Edoardo Pazzagli	Italy	Fiorentina	Prato	Co-ownership, €500
2010-01-11	Pablo Daniel Osvaldo	Italy	Bologna	(Spain) Espanyol	Loan
2010-01-11	Stefano Guberti	Italy	Roma	Sampdoria	Loan, €250K
2010-01-11	Andreas Landgren	Sweden	(Sweden) Helsingborg	Udinese	Free
2010-01-11	Cristian Daminuţă	Romania	Internazionale	(Romania) Dinamo București	Loan
2010-01-12	Felipe Chalegre	Brazil	Vicenza	Colligiana	Loan
2010-01-12	Dario Dainelli	Italy	Fiorentina	Genoa	Undisclosed
2010-01-12	Mirco Gasparetto	Italy	Chievo	Padova	Loan
2010-01-12	Riccardo Perpetuini	Italy	Lazio	Crotone	Loan
2010-01-12	Thomas Lucie–Smith	Italy	Potenza	Empoli	Co-ownership Resolution
2010-01-12	Nicolae Dică	Romania	Catania	(Romania) Cluj	Loan
2010-01-13	Silvano Raggio Garibaldi	Italy	Genoa	Sorrento	Loan
2010-01-13	Mario Cassano	Italy	Piacenza	Sampdoria	Loan
2010-01-13	Vincenzo Fiorillo	Italy	Sampdoria	Reggina	Loan
2010-01-13	Daniele Degano	Italy	Pergocrema	Crotone	Undisclosed
2010-01-13	Danilo D'Ambrosio	Italy	Juve Stabia	Torino	Co-ownership, Undisclosed
2010-01-13	Igor Djuric	Switzerland	Udinese	(Switzerland) Bellinzona	Loan
2010-01-13	Rocco D'Aiello	Italy	Gela	Torino	Loan
2010-01-13	Gabriele Cioffi	Italy	Ascoli	AlbinoLeffe	Free
2010-01-13	Nicolás Crovetto	Chile	Triestina	Taranto	Undisclosed
2010-01-14	Mattia Serafini	Italy	AlbinoLeffe	Ravenna	Loan
2010-01-14	Cristian Pasquato	Italy	Juventus	Triestina	Loan
2010-01-14	Antonio Buscè	Italy	Reggina	Bologna	Undisclosed
2010-01-14	Giacomo Tedesco	Italy	Bologna	Reggina	Undisclosed
2010-01-14	Andrea Russotto	Italy	(Switzerland) Bellinzona	Crotone	Loan
2010-01-14	Stefano Ferrario	Italy	Ravenna	Lecce	Loan
2010-01-12	Thomas Lucie–Smith	Italy	Empoli	Colligiana	Undisclosed
2010-01-15	Manolo Pestrin	Italy	Salernitana	Torino	Loan
2010-01-15	Marco Storari	Italy	Milan	Sampdoria	Loan
2010-01-15	Adem Ljajić	Serbia	(Serbia) Partizan	Fiorentina	Undisclosed
2010-01-15	José Ignacio Castillo	Argentina	Fiorentina	Bari	Undisclosed
15 January 2010	Andrea Rispoli	Italy	Brescia	Parma	Co-ownership, €3.5M (swap with Budel & Córdova)
15 January 2010	Andrea Rispoli	Italy	Parma	Brescia	Loan
15 January 2010	Alessandro Budel	Italy	Parma	Brescia	Co-ownership, €2.5M (part of Rispoli)
15 January 2010	Nicolás Córdova	Chile	Parma	Brescia	Co-ownership, €1M (part of Rispoli)
2010-01-15	Vinicius	Brazil	(Brazil) São José de Porto Alegre	Parma	Loan
2010-01-15	Fabio Conocchioli	Italy	Ascoli	Viterbese	Loan
2010-01-16	Michele Paolucci	Italy	Siena	Juventus	Loan, €500K
2010-01-18	Sulaiman Sesay Fullah	Sierra Leone	Internazionale	Parma	Undisclosed
2010-01-18	Francesco Di Gennaro	Italy	Gallipoli	Verona	Undisclosed
18 January 2010	Savio	Germany	Fiorentina	Bologna	Loan, Free
18 January 2010	Edmund Hottor	Ghana	Triestina	Milan	Co-ownership, €800,000
18 January 2010	Danilo Russo	Italy	Genoa	Vicenza	Co-ownership, €500
18 January 2010	Alberto Frison	Italy	Vicenza	Genoa	Loan, Free
18 January 2010	Daniele Vantaggiato	Italy	Rimini	Parma	Co-ownership resolution, €1.9M
18 January 2010	Daniele Vantaggiato	Italy	Parma	Padova	Co-ownership, €2.5M (€1M+ Baccolo)
18 January 2010	Pietro Baccolo	Italy	Padova	Parma	Co-ownership, €1.5M (part of Vantaggiato)
2010-01-18	Salvatore Caturano	Italy	Empoli	Viareggio	Loan
2010-01-18	Nicola Ferrari	Italy	AlbinoLeffe	Pergocrema	Undisclosed
2010-01-18	Mattia Ferrato	Italy	Pro Vercelli	Parma	Co-ownership Resolution
2010-01-18	Pasquale Maiorino	Italy	Vicenza	Manfredonia	Loan
2010-01-18	Mattia Ferrato	Italy	Parma	Carpenedolo	Co-ownership, Undisclosed
2010-01-18	Antonio Croce	Italy	Padvoa	Pro Vasto	Loan
2010-01-19	Paolo Zanetti	Italy	Torino	Atalanta	Loan
2010-01-19	Mario Salgado	Chile	Foggia	Torino	Co-ownership, Undisclosed
2010-01-19	Giuseppe Caccavallo	Italy	Cosenza	Lecce	Co-ownership Resolution
2010-01-19	Giuseppe Caccavallo	Italy	Lecce	Valle del Giovenco	Co-ownership, Undisclosed
2010-01-19	Jesús Dátolo	Argentina	Napoli	(Greece) Olympiacos	Loan
2010-01-19	Mario Bolatti	Argentina	(Portugal) Porto	Fiorentina	Undisclosed
2010-01-19	Andrea Esposito	Italy	Genoa	Livorno	Loan
2010-01-19	Alessandro Bernardini	Italy	Varese	Livorno	Co-ownership, Undisclosed
2010-01-19	Leonardo Moracci	Italy	Chievo	Alessandria	Co-ownership, Undisclosed
2010-01-19	Danijel Aleksić	Serbia	(Serbia) Vojvodina	Genoa	Undisclosed
2010-01-19	Davide Bianchi	Italy	Padova	Legnano	Loan
2010-01-19	Christian Conti	Italy	Bari	Como	Loan
2010-01-19	Baldassari	Italy	Bari	Brindisi	Loan
2010-01-20	Alex Valentini	Italy	Mantova	Pro Sesto	Loan
2010-01-20	Maxi López	Argentina	(Russia) FC Moscow	Catania	Undisclosed
2010-01-20	Flavio Lazzari	Italy	Udinese	Gallipoli	Loan
2010-01-20	Antonio Candreva	Italy	Udinese	Juventus	Loan
2010-01-20	Claudio Bellucci	Italy	Sampdoria	Livorno	Loan
2010-01-20	Federico Dionisi	Italy	Livorno	Salernitana	Loan
2010-01-20	Luciano Figueroa	Argentina	Genoa	(Argentina) Rosario Central	Free
2010-01-20	José Espinal	Dominican Republic	Cesena	Giacomense	Loan
2010-01-20	Luca Vigiani	Italy	Bologna	Reggina	Undisclosed
2010-01-21	Claudio Della Penna	Italy	Roma	Gallipoli	Loan
2010-01-21	Mariano Romano	Italy	Siena	Pergocrema	Loan
2010-01-21	Agostino Garofalo	Italy	Siena	Torino	Loan
2010-01-21	Stefan Šćepović	Serbia	(Serbia) OFK Beograd	Sampdoria	Loan
2010-01-21	Francesco Modesto	Italy	Genoa	Bologna	Loan
2010-01-21	Federico Ciasca	Italy	Lumezzane	Brescia	Co-ownership Resolution
2010-01-21	Federico Ciasca	Italy	Brescia	Lecco	Co-ownership, Undisclosed
2010-01-21	Andrea Galeotti	Italy	Lecco	Gallipoli	Undisclosed
2010-01-21	Claudio Della Penna	Italy	Roma	Gallipoli	Loan
2010-01-21	Davide Mandorlini	Italy	Gallipoli	Lecco	Undisclosed
2010-01-21	Michele Marconi	Italy	Atalanta	Lecco	Loan
2010-01-21	Patrice Feussi	Cameroon	Sorrento	Genoa	Free
2010-01-21	Patrice Feussi	Cameroon	Genoa	(Switzerland) Lugano	Free
22 January 2010	Danilo Soddimo	Italy	Sampdoria	Pescara	Co-ownership, €300,000 (swap with Bacchetti)
22 January 2010	Loris Bacchetti	Italy	Pescara	Sampdoria	Co-ownership, €300,000 (swap with Soddimo)
2010-01-22	Marco Malagò	Italy	Chievo	Siena	Loan
2010-01-22	Ilario Aloe	Italy	Ascoli	Varese	Loan
2010-01-22	Goran Slavkovski	Macedonia	Internazionale	(Germany) Bochum	Free
2010-01-22	Roberto D'Aversa	Italy	Gallipoli	Triestina	Undisclosed
2010-01-23	Raffaele Gragnaniello	Italy	Padova	Lecce	Loan
2010-01-25	Jakub Vojtus	Slovakia	(Slovakia) Žilina	Internazionale	Youth
2010-01-26	Davide Succi	Italy	Palermo	Bologna	Loan
2010-01-26	Alessio Manzoni	Italy	Parma	Brescia	Loan
2010-01-26	Ivan Artipoli	Italy	Lazio	Foggia	Loan
2010-01-26	Tommaso Davini	Italy	Viareggio	Grosseto	Co-ownership, Undisclosed
2010-01-27	Filippo Antonelli	Italy	Bari	Torino	Loan
2010-01-27	Marco Pisano	Italy	Torino	Bari	Loan
27 January 2010	Matteo Contini	Italy	Napoli	(Spain) Zaragoza	Loan
2010-01-27	Radja Nainggolan	Belgium	Piacenza	Cagliari	Loan
2010-01-27	Mikhail Sivakov	Belarus	Cagliari	Piacenza	Loan
2010-01-27	Edgar Çani	Albania	Palermo	Piacenza	Loan
2010-01-27	Cristian Agnelli	Italy	Lecce	Foggia	Free
27 January 2010	Federico Viviani	Italy	Taranto	Crotone	Undisclosed
2010-01-28	Samuele Longo	Italy	Internazionale	Piacenza	Loan
2010-01-28	Emmanuel Agyemang-Badu	Ghana	(Ghana) Berlin	Udinese	Undisclosed
2010-01-28	Azian Innocent Tano	Ghana	Udinese	(Spain) Granada	Undisclosed
2010-01-28	Antonino Bernardini	Italy	Vicenza	AlbinoLeffe	Free
2010-01-28	Jan Hable	Czech Republic	Fiorentina	Ascoli	Co-ownership, Undisclosed
2010-01-28	Ciro Ginestra	Italy	Gallipoli	Crotone	Undisclosed
2010-01-28	Luis Páez	Paraguay	(Paraguay) Tacuary	Gallipoli	Loan
28 January 2010	Dario D'Ambrosio	Italy	Chievo	Triestina	Co-ownership Resolution, €425,000
28 January 2010	Nicolò Brighenti	Italy	Triestina	Chievo	Co-ownership Resolution, €425,000
2010-01-28	Claudio Cafiero	Italy	Roma	Cassino	Loan
2010-01-28	Nicola Strambelli	Italy	Bari	Noicattaro	Loan
2010-01-28	Umberto Eusepi	Italy	Genoa (on loan at Reggiana)	Viareggio	Loan
2010-01-29	Hernán Crespo	Italy	Genoa	Parma	Undisclosed
29 January 2010	Nicola Amoruso	Italy	Parma	Atalanta	€1M
2010-01-29	Nicola Madonna	Italy	Atalanta	Vicenza	Loan
2010-01-29	Davide Di Gennaro	Italy	Milan	Livorno	Loan
2010-01-29	Alexandros Tziolis	Greece	(Greece) Panathinaikos	Siena	Undisclosed
2010-01-29	Sune Aagaard Kiilerich	Denmark	(Denmark) Midtjylland	Sampdoria	Undisclosed
2010-01-29	Rej Volpato	Italy	Bari	Gallipoli	Loan
29 January 2010	Matteo Paro	Italy	Genoa	Piacenza	Loan
2010-01-29	Giuseppe Greco	Italy	Genoa	Cesena	Loan
2010-01-29	Mauro Boerchio	Italy	Bari	Pro Sesto	Loan
2010-01-29	Mario Artistico	Italy	Pescara	Gallipoli	Loan
2010-01-29	Nicolás Amodio	Uruguay	Napoli	Piacenza	Loan
2010-01-29	Adriano Montalto	Italy	Lecco	Salernitana	Undisclosed
2010-01-29	Antonio Caracciolo	Italy	Pavia	Bari	Loan
2010-01-29	Gaël Genevier	France	Siena	Torino	Loan
2010-01-29	Sergio Volpi	Italy	Reggina	Atalanta	Loan
2010-01-29	Nwankwo Obiorah	Nigeria	(Nigeria) ECO	Internazionale	Undisclosed
2010-01-29	Luca Castiglia	Italy	Juventus	Reggiana	Loan
29 January 2010	Matteo Negrini	Italy	Empoli	Ternana	Undisclosed
2010-01-30	Bojan Jokić	Slovenia	(France) Sochaux	Chievo	Loan
2010-01-30	Nemanja Mitrovic	Slovenia	Internazionale (youth)	Sassuolo (youth)	Loan
2010-01-30	Milan Jirásek	Czech Republic	Internazionale (youth)	Sassuolo (youth)	Loan
30 January 2010	Francesco Valiani	Italy	Bologna	Parma	Co-ownership, €2.5M (swap with Pisanu)
30 January 2010	Andrea Pisanu	Italy	Parma	Bologna	Co-ownership, €2.5M (swap with Valiani)
2010-01-30	Haris Seferovic	Switzerland	(Switzerland) Grasshopper	Fiorentina	Undisclosed
2010-01-31	Ahmed Barusso	Ghana	Roma	Brescia	Loan
2010-01-31	Thomas Hitzlsperger	Germany	(Germany) Stuttgart	Lazio	€0.55M
2010-02-01	Ergün Berisha	Turkey	Udinese	(Turkey) Istanbul BB	Loan
2010-02-01	Mancini	Brazil	Internazionale	Milan	Loan
2010-02-01	Keirrison	Brazil	(Spain) Barcelona	Fiorentina	Loan, 1½season
2010-02-01	Martin Jørgensen	Denmark	Fiorentina	(Denmark) AGF	Free
2010-02-01	Andrea Mei	Italy	Internazionale	Lumezzane	Loan
2010-02-01	Attila Filkor	Hungary	Internazionale	Gallipoli	Loan
2010-02-01	Juri Toppan	Italy	Internazionale	Catania	Loan
2010-02-01	Luca Stocchi	Italy	Internazionale	Piacenza	Loan
1 February 2010	Giuseppe Angarano	Italy	Internazionale	Piacenza	Co-ownership, €500
1 February 2010	McDonald Mariga	Kenya	Parma	Internazionale	Co-ownership, €5M (€2.5M + Biabiany)
1 February 2010	Jonathan Biabiany	France	Internazionale	Parma	Co-ownership, €2.5M (part of Biabiany)
1 February 2010	Luis Antonio Jiménez	Chile	Internazionale	Parma	Loan
1 February 2010	Federico Del Grosso	Italy	Ternana	Internazionale	Co-ownership, €180,000
2010-02-01	Federico Del Grosso	Italy	Internazionale	Pro Patria	Loan
2010-02-01	Alexandre Geijo	Switzerland	(Spain) Racing de Santander	Udinese	Undisclosed
2010-02-01	Federico Paolucci	Argentina	Udinese	(Chile) Universidad de Concepción	Loan, 1 season
2010-02-01	Sodinha	Brazil	Udinese	Triestina	Loan
2010-02-01	Girolamo Provenzano	Italy	Udinese	Canavese	Loan
1 February 2010	Piermario Morosini	Italy	Udinese	Padova	Loan
2010-02-01	Gaetano Cala	Italy	Udinese	Alghero	Loan
2010-02-01	Ricardo Villar	Argentina	Udinese	Cremonese	Loan
2010-02-01	Henri Toivomäki	Finland	(Finland) Lahti	Atalanta	Loan
1 February 2010	Davide Bombardini	Italy	Bologna	AlbinoLeffe	Free
2010-02-01	Fabio Gavazzi	Italy	AlbinoLeffe	Pro Sesto	Loan
2010-02-01	Marco Pedotti	Italy	Crotone	Lecco	Undisclosed
2010-02-01	Davide Morello	Italy	Unattached	Torino	Free
2010-02-01	Luigi Alberto Scaglia	Italy	Lumezzane	Brescia	Co-ownership resolution
2010-02-01	Luigi Alberto Scaglia	Italy	Bresica	Torino	Loan
2010-02-01	Giuseppe Statella	Italy	Bari	Torino	Loan
2010-02-01	Piergiuseppe Maritato	Italy	Fiorentina	Giulianova	Loan
2010-02-01	Orlando Urbano	Italy	Vicenza	Perugia	Loan
2010-02-01	Fabio Gatti	Italy	Perugia	Vicenza	Loan
2010-02-01	Giampietro Perrulli	Italy	Vicenza	Perugia	Loan
2010-02-01	Filippo Forò	Italy	Vicenza	Perugia	Loan
2010-02-01	Francesco Della Rocca	Italy	Bologna	Perugia	Loan
2010-02-01	Emanuele Ferraro	Italy	Salernitana	Taranto	Undisclosed
2010-02-01	Giuseppe Biava	Italy	Genoa	Lazio	€0.8M + other cost
1 February 2010	Robert Gucher	Italy	Frosinone	Genoa	Loan, €200,000 (through player swap)
2010-02-01	Nicola Madonna	Italy	Atalanta	Vicenza	Loan
1 February 2010	Luca Di Matteo	Italy	Palermo	Vicenza	Co-ownership, €500
1 February 2010	Cristian Melinte	Romania	Palermo	Piacenza	Loan, Free
1 February 2010	Marco Calderoni	Italy	Piacenza	Palermo	Loan, Free
1 February 2010	Ionuţ Florin Radu	Romania	Chievo (youth)	Palermo (youth)	Free
1 February 2010	Afriyie Acquah	Ghana	(Ghana) DC United	Palermo (youth)	Free (€500,000 commission)
2010-02-01	Ondřej Čelůstka	Czech Republic	(Czech Republic) Slavia Prague	Palermo (youth)	Loan
2010-02-01	Alessio Sestu	Italy	Vicenza	Bari	Loan
2010-02-01	András Gosztonyi	Hungary	(Hungary) MTK Hungária	Bari	Loan
2010-02-01	Daniele Fiorentino	Italy	Bari	Andria	Loan
2010-02-01	Alex Calderoni	Italy	Torino	Triestina	Undisclosed
2010-02-01	Riccardo Colombo	Italy	Torino	Triestina	Loan
2010-02-01	Francesco Pratali	Italy	Torino	Siena	Loan
2010-02-01	David Di Michele	Italy	Torino	Lecce	Loan
2010-02-01	Massimo Loviso	Italy	Torino	Lecce	Loan
2010-02-01	Stefano Okaka	Italy	Roma	(England) Fulham	Loan, €175K
2010-02-01	Mauro Esposito	Italy	Roma	Grosseto	Loan
2010-02-01	Adrian Piţ	Romania	Roma	Triestina	Loan
2010-02-01	Federico Marchetti	Italy	AlbinoLeffe	Cagliari	Co-ownership resolution
1 February 2010	Riccardo Pasi	Italy	Bologna	Parma	Co-ownership, €1M (swap with Elia)
1 February 2010	Alessandro Elia	Italy	Parma	Bologna	Co-ownership, €1M (swap with Pasi)
1 February 2010	Paolo Castelli	Italy	Modena	Crotone	Free
2010-02-01	Digão	Brazil	Milan	Crotone	Loan
2010-02-01	Enrico Cotza	Italy	Cagliari	Alghero	Loan
2010-02-01	Rafael Acosta	Venezuela	Cagliari	(Greece) Diagoras	Loan
2010-02-01	Valerio Frasca	Italy	Roma	Arezzo	Loan
2010-02-01	Daniele Conti	Italy	Palermo	Arezzo	Loan
2010-02-01	Tommaso Bianchi	Italy	Piacenza	Chievo	Loan
2010-02-01	Julián Magallanes	Argentina	Vicenza	Cittadella	Loan
2010-02-01	Jürgen Säumel	Austria	Torino	Brescia	Loan
2010-02-01	Alberto Filippini	Italy	Padova	Como	Loan
2010-02-01	Dimas	Brazil	Chievo	Sambonifacese	Loan
2010-02-01	Maximiliano Uggè	Italy	Internazionale (youth)	Monza (youth)	
2010-02-01	Alessio Viola	Italy	Reggina	Monza	Loan
2010-02-01	André Dias	Brazil	(Brazil) São Paulo	Lazio	€2.63M
2010-02-01	Gonzalo Barreto	Uruguay	(Uruguay) Danubio	Lazio	€1.781M
2010-02-01	Gabriel Ferrari	United States	Sampdoria	Ternana	Loan
2010-02-01	Francesco Benussi	Italy	Lecce	Palermo	Loan
2010-02-01	Rubinho	Brazil	Palermo	Livorno	Loan
2010-02-01	Samuele Dalla Bona	Italy	Napoli	Verona	Loan
1 February 2010	Leonardo Blanchard	Italy	Siena (at VdG, t)	Pergocrema	Loan
1 February 2010	Fabrizio Di Bella	Italy	Livorno (at Pergocrema, t)	VdG	Loan
2010-02-01	David Meza	Paraguay	Real Misano	Cesena	Undisclosed
2010-02-01	Filippo Fracaro	Italy	Chievo (youth)	Vicenza (youth)	Loan
2010-02-01	Zsolt Tamási	Hungary	Cisco Roma	Parma	Loan
2010-02-01	Daniele Piro	Italy	Cosenza	Pro Vasto	€500 (co-owned with Chievo)
2010-02-01	Stefano Procida	Italy	Torino (youth)	Ternana	Co-ownership, Undisclosed
2010-02-01	Andrea Caroppo	Italy	Brescia (at Olbia, t)	Palermo	Loan
2010-02-01	Ivan Castiglia	Italy	Cittadella	Reggina	Loan (between co-owner)
1 February 2010	Nicola Dal Bosco	Italy	Vicenza (on loan at Rodengo Saiano)	Alghero	Loan
1 February 2010	Steve Pinau	France	Genoa (at (Switzerland) Lugano,t )	Arles (France)	Loan
2010-02-02	Drissa Diarra		Lecce	(Switzerland) Bellinzona	Loan
2010-02-02	Fausto Rossini	Italy	Livorno	(Switzerland) Bellinzona	Free
2010-02-02	Andrea D'Amico	Italy	Catania	Colligiana	Loan
2010-02-03	João Paulo Fernando Marangon	Brazil	Roma	Igea Virtus	Loan
2010-02-03	Moreno	Brazil	Udinese	(Brazil) Guarani	Free
	Leandro Antonio Martínez	Italy	Parma	(Switzerland) Biaschesi	Undisclosed
	Matteo Prandelli	Italy	Siena	Como	Co-ownership, Undisclosed
	Massimo Fornoni	Italy	Crotone	Siracusa	Loan
	Riccardo Ragni	Italy	Pescara (youth)	Chieti	Loan

^{1}Player officially joined his new club on 2 January 2010.
^{2}Player officially joined his new club on 4 January 2010.

=== Out of window transfer ===
Date	Name	Nat	Moving from	Moving to	Fee
2010-02-05	Josias Basso	Brazil	Reggina	(Romania) Universitatea Cluj	Undisclosed
2010-02-08	Aimo Diana	Italy	Torino	(Switzerland) Bellinzona	Loan
2010-02-09	Cicinho	Brazil	Roma	(Brazil) São Paulo	Loan
2010-02-10	Gabriele Aldegani	Italy	Uattached	Grosseto	Free
2010-02-12	Felice Piccolo	Italy	Empoli (on loan at Chievo)	(Romania) Cluj	Loan
2010-02-18	Sidny	Brazil	Livorno	(Brazil) Brasiliense	Undisclosed
2010-02-19	Mario Kirev	Bulgaria	Juventus	(Switzerland) Thun	Loan
2010-02-25	Davide Bottone	Italy	Torino	(Romania) Cluj	Loan
2010-02-26	Roberto De Zerbi	Italy	Napoli	(Romania) Cluj	Loan
