= Moris Carrozzieri =

Italian football defender

Personal information
- Date of birth: 16 November 1980 (age 45)
- Place of birth: Giulianova, Italy
- Height: 1.92 m (6 ft 3 1/2 in)
- Position: Centre back

Youth career
- Bari

Senior career*
| Years | Team | Apps | (Gls) |
| 2000–2002 | Bari | 0 | (0) |
| 2000–2001 | → Fidelis Andria (loan) | 13 | (2) |
| 2001 | → Giulianova (loan) | 5 | (0) |
| 2001–2002 | → Martina (loan) | 4 | (0) |
| 2002–2003 | Teramo | 39 | (5) |
| 2003–2006 | Sampdoria | 28 | (0) |
| 2005–2006 | → Arezzo (loan) | 35 | (2) |
| 2006–2008 | Atalanta | 39 | (3) |
| 2008–2011 | Palermo | 24 | (0) |
| 2011–2012 | Lecce | 12 | (0) |
| 2012–2013 | Varese | 14 | (0) |
| 2013–2014 | Città di Giulianova | 2 | (0) |
| 2014 | Bellante | | |
- * Club domestic league appearances and goals

Moris Carrozzieri (born 16 November 1980) is an Italian former footballer who played as a defender.

== Club career ==
=== Early career ===
Carrozzieri started his professional career at AS Bari. He was loaned to Fidelis Andria and Giulianova (both at Serie C1) and then to Martina and Teramo (both at Serie C2).

He help Teramo gain promotion to Serie C1 in summer 2002, and the club bought half of the registration rights of the player. In summer 2003, Carrozzieri was sold to newly promoted team Sampdoria, by Teramo bought Bari's half and re-sold to the Genoese club.

=== Sampdoria ===
First season of Carrozzieri in Serie A, he made 25 appearances and the team finished 8th. The club bought rest of the rights at the end of the season.

However, he just made 3 appearances in the second season, and he was loaned to AC Arezzo of Serie B at the end of the season.

He made 35 appearances and the team finished 7th.

=== Atalanta ===
On 5 July 2006 newly promoted Atalanta signed Carrozzieri by bought half of the registration rights for €1.1 million, which saw Carrozzieri returned to Italian top division.

On 21 September 2006 Carrozzieri was suspended for two months by the Lega Calcio as investigation turned out he and 2005 teammate Francesco Flachi at UC Sampdoria were gathering information for gamblers in Italian football. Sampdoria received a €20,000 fine. The appeal to Commissione d'Appello Federale of Federazione Italiana Giuoco Calcio was also dismissed.

Atalanta bought all the rights on 6 June 2007 for €870,000. (which Sampdoria booked a financial loss of €230,000 for the discount).

=== Palermo ===
On 25 June 2008 Palermo confirmed Carrozzieri agreed a four-year contract with the rosanero, where he will have the chance to join Stefano Colantuono, his head coach at Atalanta in 2006–07 season. The transfer fees cost Palermo €3.4million. Palermo also signed Simon Kjær and Cesare Bovo that transfer windows and the cost almost equal to the revenue of the sale of Andrea Barzagli.

Despite the dismissal of Colantuono following a defeat to Udinese and his replacement with Davide Ballardini, Carrozzieri confirmed himself as a key player for the rosanero, thanks to his strength and his noted heading abilities.

==== Ban and return to football ====
On 23 April 2009 the Italian Football Federation announced Moris Carrozzieri tested positive for cocaine after a test on 5 April, after Palermo's 1–0 Serie A win against Torino. Under Italian football rules, the player was immediately suspended from footballing activities. In July 2009 he was officially banned from football for two years, and was also forbidden from any football-related activities, including participating to training sessions. His ban expired in April 2011, allowing him to be able to join again the train sessions at Palermo. Following the ban, Carrozzieri and Palermo agreed a new minimum wage (€50,000 per year).

He returned to play on 29 May 2011, as a substitute for injured defender Dorin Goian during the 2010–11 Coppa Italia final against Inter, that ended in a 1–3 loss for the Sicilians.

=== Lecce ===
On 14 July 2011 Carrozzeri mutually terminated his contract with Palermo and signed for Lecce thereafter. However, in August he injured the left knee meniscus.

=== Varese ===
On 15 August 2012, Carrozzieri signed a one-year deal with Serie B side AS Varese 1910.

=== Città di Giulianova ===
In summer 2013 he was signed by Serie D newcomers Città di Giulianova. However, he was suspended for 3 matches soon after a violence incident during a match. Circa February 2014 Carrozzieri joined Bellante.

== Managerial career ==
Carrozzieri became part of Città di Giulianova's non-playing staff in 2014. He was suspended again from January to May in 2015; he was dismissed as the director of sport in October 2015.
