= Andrea Censori =

Italian footballer (born 1988)

Personal information
- Date of birth: 25 July 1988 (age 38)
- Place of birth: Sant'Egidio alla Vibrata, Italy
- Height: 1.75 m (5 ft 9 in)
- Position: Midfielder

Youth career
- –2004: Santegidiese

Senior career*
Years	Team	Apps	(Gls)
2004–2006	Santegidiese		
2006–2007	Arezzo	0	(0)
2007–2010	Valle del Giovenco	43+	(2)
2010	Giulianova	16	(1)
2010–2013	Santegidiese	48+	(6)
2013–2014	San Nicolò		(0)
2014–2015	Giulianova	28	(3)
2015	Campobasso	9	(1)
2015–2016	Avezzano	15	(3)
2016–2017	Jesina	27	(2)
2017	Nerostellati	7	(0)
2017–2018	Ciabbino		(0)
2018–2019	San Marco Servigliano	16	(1)
2019	Castelnuovo Vomano		
2019–2020	San Marco Servigliano	16	(0)
2020–2021	Santegidiese		
2021–2022	Alba Adriatica		
- * Club domestic league appearances and goals as of 22:21, 2 October 2022 (UTC)

Andrea Censori (born 25 July 1988) is an Italian footballer who plays as a midfielder.

== Career ==
Coming through the youth system, Censori began his senior career at local club Santegidiese. He played professionally for Arezzo, Giulianova and Valle del Giovenco (in Serie C), and non-professionally for Nerostellati, Jesina, Avezzano and Campobasso (in Serie D), and San Nicolò, Ciabbino and San Marco Servigliano (in Eccellenza).

In July 2021, Censori joined Alba Adriatica from Santegidiese ahead of the 2021–22 season on a free transfer.
