= Cristiano Del Grosso =

Italian footballer (born 1983)

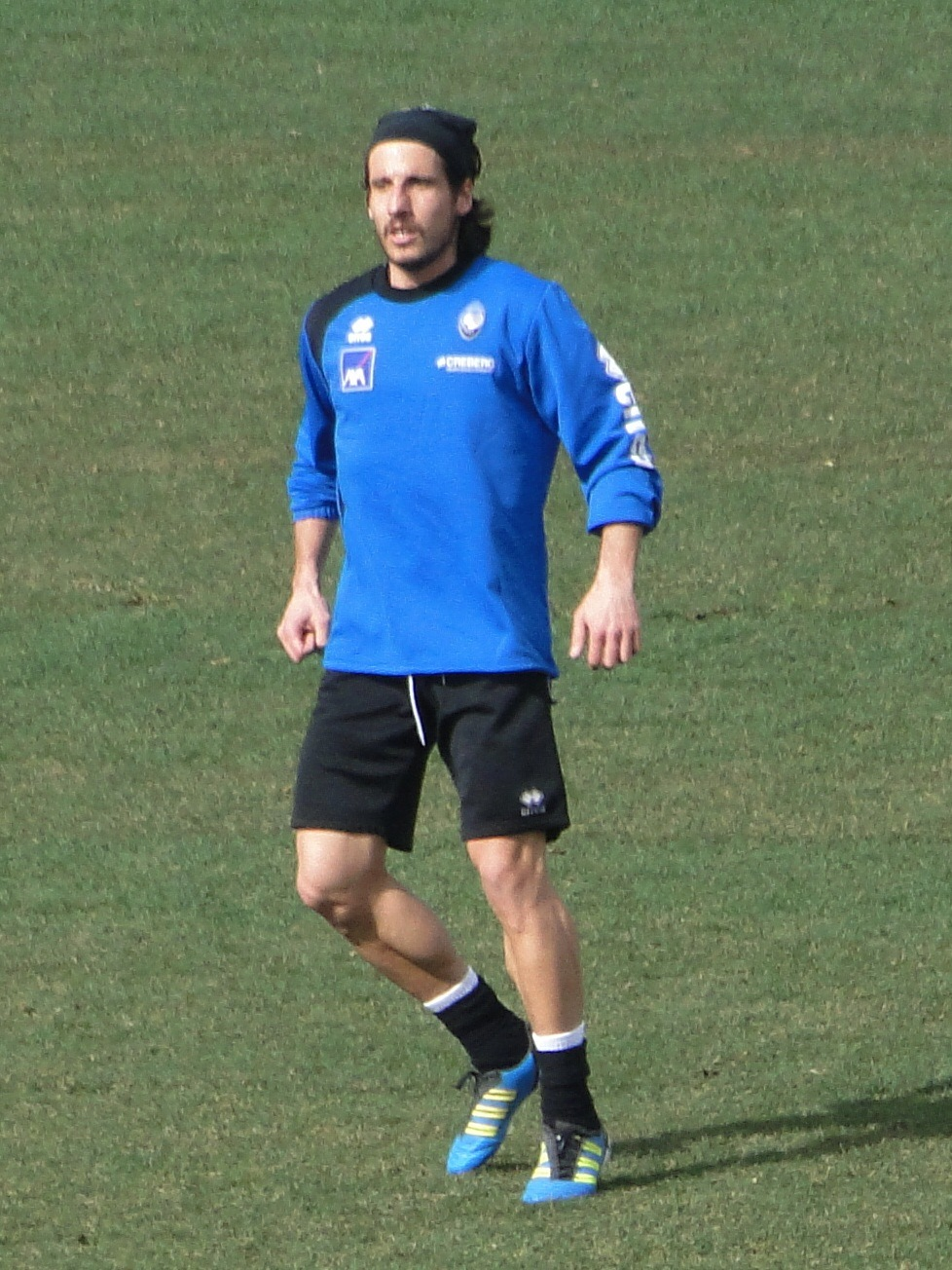

Personal information
- Date of birth: 24 March 1983 (age 43)
- Place of birth: Giulianova, Italy
- Height: 1.75 m (5 ft 9 in)
- Position: Left back

Team information
- Current team: Palermo (Under-19 youth coach)

Senior career*
Years	Team	Apps	(Gls)
2000–2006	Giulianova	132	(7)
2005–2006	→ Ascoli (loan)	30	(0)
2006–2008	Cagliari	39	(0)
2008–2013	Siena	133	(3)
2013–2017	Atalanta	45	(1)
2015–2016	→ Bari (loan)	12	(0)
2016–2017	→ SPAL (loan)	22	(0)
2017–2018	Venezia	21	(1)
2018–2020	Pescara	39	(1)
2020	Real Giulianova	8	(0)
2021	Casertana	16	(0)
- * Club domestic league appearances and goals as of 9 May 2021

Cristiano Del Grosso (born 24 March 1983) is an Italian football coach and former left back. He is currently in charge as the Under-19 youth coach of Palermo.

He is the twin brother of Federico, who is also a defender.

== Playing career ==
=== Siena ===
Del Grosso renewed his contract with Siena on 15 June 2011, signing a new 2-year contract.

=== Venezia ===
On 18 August 2017, newly promoted Serie B side Venezia signed Del Grosso for the 2017–18 season.

=== Pescara ===
On 17 July 2018 he signed with Serie B club Pescara.

=== Real Giulianova ===
On 5 September 2020 he returned to his native city and joined Real Giulianova in Serie D.

=== Casertana ===
On 1 January 2021 he signed with Serie C club Casertana.

== Coaching career ==
After retirement, Del Grosso returned to Pescara as an Under-16 youth coach and then as a first-team assistant coach. In 2022, he joined Palermo as the club's new Under-17 youth coach.

On 30 July 2024, Palermo announced the promotion of Del Grosso as their new Under-19 youth coach. Under his management, the Palermo youth team focuses on developing talent, with his contract expected to run until June 30, 2026.
