= Davide Recchiuti =

Italian footballer (born 1994)

Personal information
- Date of birth: 1 April 1994 (age 32)
- Place of birth: Atri, Italy
- Position: Midfielder

Team information
- Current team: San Nicolò

Senior career*
| Years | Team | Apps | (Gls) |
| 2011–2012 | Giulianova | 5 | (1) |
| 2012–2013 | Chievo | 0 | (0) |
| 2013 | Brescia | 0 | (0) |
| 2013– | San Nicolò | 0 | (0) |
- * Club domestic league appearances and goals

Davide Recchiuti (born 1 April 1994) is a former Italian professional footballer who plays for San Nicolò.

== Biography ==
Born in Atri, Abruzzo, Recchiuti started his career at Abruzzo club Giulianova. He played for the youth team in Campionato Nazionale Allievi from 2009 to 2011. Recchiuti was the member of the reserve in 2011–12 season, but also played a few games for the first team.

After the team went bankrupt, he was signed by Chievo. On 31 January 2013 he was signed by Brescia for €500,000 on a 1 1/2-year contract. Brescia did not pay Chievo in cash but instead sold youngster Federico Bontempi (born 1996) in July 2013 to Chievo. Recchiuti made his debut on 8 February 2013 against Milan reserve.

Recchiuti only played 2 games and 7 games respectively for the reserve of Chievo and Brescia.

In August 2013 he was signed by San Nicolò of Eccellenza Abruzzo (Italian 6th highest level).
