= Federico Del Grosso =

Italian footballer and coach

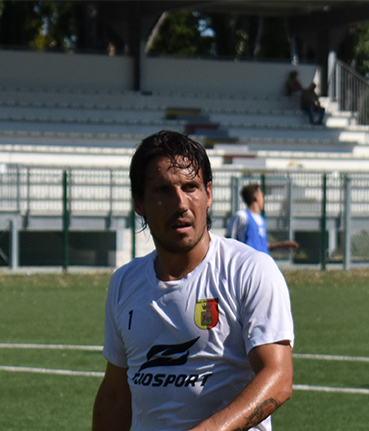

Personal information
- Date of birth: 24 March 1983 (age 43)
- Place of birth: Giulianova, Italy
- Height: 1.79 m (5 ft 10 1/2 in)
- Position: Defender

Youth career
- Giulianova

Senior career*
Years	Team	Apps	(Gls)
2000–2006	Giulianova	141	(1)
2006–2010	Ternana	81	(1)
2010–2011	Internazionale	0	(0)
2010	→ Pro Patria (loan)	8	(0)
2012	Giulianova	16	(0)
2012–2013	Ancona	22	(0)
2013–2014	Giulianova	25	(0)
2014–2016	Chieti	58	(0)
2016–2019	Real Giulianova	97	(5)

Managerial career
- 2019–2021: Real Giulianova
- * Club domestic league appearances and goals

Federico Del Grosso (born 24 March 1983) is an Italian football coach and a former player who played as a defender.

== Career ==
The twin brother of Cristiano, the Del Grosso twins started their career at their hometown club Giulianova in Serie C1. They played over 100 league matches before leaving the club in 2006. That same year, Cristiano was signed by Serie A club Cagliari Calcio, while Federico was signed by Ternana which had just been relegated to Serie B.

On 1 February 2010, Cristiano was sold to Internazionale in a co-ownership deal, for €180,000. On the same day he was loaned back to Lega Pro Prima Divisione for Pro Patria.

In June 2010, Ternana bought back Luis Antonio Jiménez and gave up Del Grosso, making a net cash profit of €2.977 million which was entirely transferred to Internazionale during the 2009–10 season. Del Grosso trained alone in the summer of 2010; however, he injured his patellar ligament.

In July 2011 he terminated his remaining 3-year contract with Inter, made Inter write-down his accounting value of €264,000.

In August 2016 Del Grosso returned to Giulianova, for amateur club Real Giulianova, a spiritual successor of Giulianova Calcio.

== Coaching career ==
On 19 January 2021, he was fired as the head coach of Giulianova.
