= Censori =

Censori may refer to:

- Censori (Republic of Venice), a judicial magistracy of the Republic of Venice
- Andrea Censori, Italian footballer
- Bianca Censori, Australian model and wife of Kanye West
