= Michele Rinaldi (footballer, born 1991) =

Italian footballer

Personal information
- Date of birth: 28 June 1991 (age 35)
- Position: Midfielder

Senior career*
Years	Team	Apps	(Gls)
2009–2012	Giulianova	42	(1)
2012–2013	Chieti	21	(2)
2013–2014	Città di Giulianova		
- * Club domestic league appearances and goals

Michele Rinaldi (born 28 June 1991) is an Italian footballer.

In 2012, he was signed by Lega Pro Seconda Divisione club Chieti.
