= Michele Rinaldi =

Michele Rinaldi may refer to:

- Michele Rinaldi (footballer, born 1987), Italian footballer for Serie A, B and Lega Pro clubs
- Michele Rinaldi (footballer, born 1991), Italian footballer for Lega Pro clubs
- Michele Rinaldi (motorcyclist) (born 1959), Italian former Grand Prix motocross World Champion
