= Ferrato =

Ferrato is an Italian surname. Notable people with the surname include:

- Donna Ferrato (born 1949), American photojournalist and activist
- Mattia Ferrato (born 1989), Italian footballer
