= Rosetana Calcio =

Italian football club

Rosetana
- Full name: Rosetana Calcio
- Founded: 1924
- Dissolved: 2014
- Ground: Stadio Fonte Dell'Olmo, Roseto degli Abruzzi, Italy

Rosetana Calcio S.r.l. was an Italian football club based in Roseto degli Abruzzi, in the province of Teramo, Abruzzo region. The club was known as Polisportiva Rosetana Calcio in professional league from 2003 to 2005. However, in 2005 the club was not admitted to 2005–06 Serie C2, due to the failure in financial stress test.

The club was admitted to 2005–06 Promozione. Rosetana Calcio (matricola number: 43390) promoted to Eccellenza Abruzzo in 2009. In 2014 the club withdrew from football league. In 2015 an illegitimate phoenix club, A.S.D. Rosetana Calcio (matricola number: 930964), was admitted to Prima Categoria. Giuseppe Lamedica Gino Iachini
