= ASD Città di Giulianova 1924 =

Italian football club

Città di Giulianova
- Full name: Associazione Sportiva Dilettantistica Città di Giulianova 1924 Attività Sportiva Dilettantistica
- Nickname: Giallorossi (yellow-reds)
- Founded: 1974 (Cologna Paese); 2012 (relocation)
- Dissolved: 2016
- Ground: Stadio Rubens Fadini, Giulianova, Italy
- Capacity: 4,347
- Chairman: Ferdinando Perletta
- 2015–16: Serie D/F, 17th (relegated)
Home colours	Away colours

A.S.D. Città di Giulianova 1924 A.R.L. was an Italian association football club based in Giulianova, in the province of Teramo, Abruzzo. Relocated from Roseto degli Abruzzi in 2012, Città di Giulianova played in Eccellenza Abruzzo in 2012–13 season and Serie D from 2013 to 2016.

The club was an illegitimate phoenix club of Giulianova Calcio (matricola number: 21780). In 2016 Città di Giulianova was replaced by A.S.D. Real Giulianova.

== History ==
=== A.S.D. Cologna Paese Calcio ===
A.S.D. Cologna Paese Calcio (matricola number: 61845), based in Cologna Paese frazione, Roseto degli Abruzzi, in the province of Teramo, won 2007 Eccellenza Abruzzo and promotion to Serie D. That season the club signed former professional footballer Antonio Croce, who returned to professional football in 2008. In 2008 the club also relegated back to Eccellenza.

In 2012 the sports title was relocated to Giulianova by the decision of the club president Ferdinando Perletta.

At the same time A.S.D. Cologna Spiaggia (matricola number: 73826), from the frazione of the same name, also in Roseto degli Abruzzi, renamed to A.S.D. Cologna (later A.S.D. Cologna Città di Roseto and A.S.D. Cologna Calcio) as the representatives of the two frazioni, in Prima Categoria. However, Cologna Paese was re-founded and chaired by Daniele Perletta, son of Ferdinando Perletta in Terza Categoria in some time later.

Cologna Paese had a rivality with Rosetana, a club based in Roseto degli Abruzzi.

=== A.S.D. Città di Giulianova 1924 ===
In 2012, after the bankruptcy of Giulianova Calcio, Cologna Paese was allowed by Italian Football Federation to relocate to Giulianova. The club also renamed itself to A.S.D. Città di Giulianova 1924 (matricola number: 61845). The club won promotion to Serie D in 2013. In 2015, Città di Giulianova did not renew the contract with Giuliesi per Sempre, the owner of the logo of the original Giulianova team.

Scuola Calcio Giulianova, a football academy, was a partner of Città di Giulianova. However, in 2014 S.C. Giulianova merged with Colleranesco to become another team which compete in adult football league, as Calcio Giulianova.

In 2016 the club was relegated from Serie D. However, the club did not play in Eccellenza Abruzzo either. Another new team A.S.D. Real Giulianova was birth in Promozione by the relocation of A.S.D. Castellalto.

== Colors and badge ==
Its colours are yellow and red.

== Stadium ==
It plays its home matches at Stadio Rubens Fadini.
