= Ivan Castiglia =

Italian footballer (born 1988)

Personal information
- Full name: Ivan Castiglia
- Date of birth: 6 January 1988 (age 38)
- Place of birth: Cosenza, Italy
- Height: 1.81 m (5 ft 11 1/2 in)
- Position: Midfielder

Team information
- Current team: Giulianova

Youth career
- Reggina

Senior career*
Years	Team	Apps	(Gls)
2005–2008	Reggina	3	(0)
2007	→ Vicenza (loan)	1	(0)
2007–2008	→ Martina (loan)	17	(0)
2008	→ Lucchese (loan)	2	(0)
2008–2010	Cittadella	43	(0)
2010	→ Reggina (loan)	3	(0)
2010–2013	Reggina	44	(0)
2013	→ Catanzaro (loan)	11	(0)
2013–2014	Vicenza	29	(3)
2014–2015	Salernitana	4	(0)
2015	→ Como (loan)	20	(2)
2015–2016	Catania	16	(0)
2016–2017	Siena	19	(1)
2017–2019	Triestina	4	(0)
2018	→ Reggina (loan)	9	(0)
2019–	Giulianova	7	(0)

International career
2003–2004	Italy U-16	10	(0)
2004–2005	Italy U-17	5	(0)
2005	Italy U-18	2	(0)
2005–2006	Italy U-19	3	(0)
2007	Italy U-20	1	(0)
2009	Italy U-21	2	(0)
- * Club domestic league appearances and goals as of 01:56, 20 March 2020 (UTC)

Ivan Castiglia (born 6 January 1988) is an Italian footballer who plays for Serie D club Giulianova.

== Club career ==
Castiglia returned to Reggina from Cittadella in the winter transfer season of 2010.

On 31 August 2013 he was re-signed by Vicenza.

At the beginning of the 2014–15 season plays for Salernitana; in January 2015 goes to Como. In the summer of 2015 he moved to Catania. The following year signing for the Robur Siena.
