= Giuseppe Cozzolino =

Italian footballer

Personal information
- Full name: Giuseppe Cozzolino
- Date of birth: 12 July 1985 (age 41)
- Place of birth: San Gennaro Vesuviano, Italy
- Height: 1.85 m (6 ft 1 in)
- Position: Striker

Team information
- Current team: ASD Castelbaldo Masi

Senior career*
Years	Team	Apps	(Gls)
2003–2004	Giulianova	40	(7)
2005–2006	Lecce	32	(2)
2007	Chievo	5	(0)
2007–2009	Cremonese	14	(0)
2008–2009	→ Potenza (loan)	29	(7)
2009–2011	Como	49	(15)
2011	→ Andria (loan)	6	(1)
2011–2013	Pro Patria	56	(19)
2013–2014	SPAL	32	(7)
2014	Delta Rovigo	17	(16)
2014–2015	Altovicentino	18	(5)
2015–2017	Castelvetro Calcio		(44)
2017–2018	Rosselli Mutina		(10)
2018	Axys Zola	9	(4)
2018–2019	Castelvetro Calcio	7	(5)
2019	ASD Castelbaldo Masi		
2019–	AQS Borgo Veneto		

International career
2004–2006	Italy U20	7	(1)
- * Club domestic league appearances and goals as of 14:12, 20 July 2019 (UTC)

Giuseppe Cozzolino (born 12 July 1985) is an Italian footballer who plays for AQS Borgo Veneto.

== Biography ==
He was signed by Lecce in co-ownership deal in January 2005 from Serie C1 team Giulianova Calcio, although did not play any Serie A match, he earn a place in Italian U-20 on 2005 FIFA World Youth Championship. He then made 25 appearances, scored 2 goals. He follow Lecce relegated to Serie B in June 2006.

In January 2007, he was signed by Chievo in another co-ownership deal for €300,000. On 11 February 2007 he played his first Serie A match for Chievo against Inter.

In summer 2007, Chievo own half was transferred to Cremonese of Serie C1. Lecce paid Chievo €260,000 and Cremonese paid Lecce for an undisclosed fee.

In mid-2009, he was signed by Calcio Como.

In July 2011 he terminated his contract with club.

Ahead of the 2019/20 season, Cozzolino joined ASD Castelbaldo Masi. He left the club in December 2019 and joined Prima Categoria club AQS Borgo Veneto.
