= Renan Wagner =

Brazilian footballer

Personal information
- Full name: Renan Guilherme Wagner
- Date of birth: 19 December 1991 (age 34)
- Place of birth: Blumenau, Brazil
- Height: 1.80 m (5 ft 11 in)
- Position: Midfielder

Team information
- Current team: Tuttocuoio

Youth career
- Campo Grande
- 2005–2010: Vicenza
- 2008–2009: → Internazionale (loan)
- 2010–2011: Varese

Senior career*
Years	Team	Apps	(Gls)
2011–2013	Varese	0	(0)
2011–2012	→ Foggia (loan)	26	(1)
2012–2013	→ Entella (loan)	5	(0)
2013	→ Normanna (loan)	8	(0)
2013–2014	Triestina	19	(2)
2014–2015	Ischia	7	(1)
2015–2016	Metropolitano	2	(0)
2016–2017	Karlstad BK		
2017–2019	Metropolitano	5	(1)
2019	Team Altamura	12	(0)
2019–	Tuttocuoio	10	(0)
- * Club domestic league appearances and goals

Renan Guilherme Wagner (born 19 December 1991) is a Brazilian footballer who plays as a midfielder for Metropolitano.

Wagner also holds a German passport._

== Career ==
=== Youth career ===
Born in Blumenau, Santa Catarina state, Wagner started his career at Rio de Janeiro team Campo Grande. Through agent Pedrinho VRP, he arrived Italy along with Felipe Chalegre and Diego Tolentino. He played for Vicenza's Primavera under-20 team in 2007–08 season. He moved to Internazionale Primavera in 2008. Inter signed him along with Jean Mbida. In exchange, Nicolas Giani, Ivan Fatić (loan), youngster Ivan Reali (loan) and Renato Ricci (loan) joined Vicenza. However, in January 2009 he returned to the city of Vicenza.

On 31 August 2010, he joined the fellow Serie B team Varese.

=== Senior career ===
On 2 August 2011 he left for Foggia.

On 1 July 2013 Wagner returned to Varese and was awarded no.25 shirt. However, in the same summer, he left for Triestina.
