= Santegidiese Calcio SSD =

Italian football club

Santegidiese
- Full name: Santegidiese Calcio Società Sportiva Dilettantistica
- Nicknames: Giallorossi (Yellow and reds); Vibratiani (The People from Vibrata)
- Founded: 1948
- Ground: Stadio Comunale; Sant'Egidio alla Vibrata, Italy
- Capacity: 2,000
- Chairman: Claudia Paliotti
- Manager: Michele Scaringella
- League: Eccellenza Abruzzo
- 2011–12: Serie D/F, 15th
Home colours	Away colours

Santegidiese Calcio Società Sportiva Dilettantistica is an Italian association football club based in Sant'Egidio alla Vibrata, Abruzzo. It currently plays in Eccellenza.

== History ==
The club was founded in 1948.

=== Serie D ===
The club were promoted from the Eccellenza Abruzzo to Serie D following a first-place finish in the 2005–06 season.

In the season 2011–12 it was relegated to Eccellenza.

== Colors and badge ==
Their official colors are yellow and red.
