= Voltarrosto =

- Frazione
- Interactive map of Voltarrosto
- Coordinates: 42°39′50″N 14°00′21″E
- Country: Italy
- Region: Abruzzo
- Province: Teramo
- Time zone: UTC+1 (CET)
  - Summer (DST): UTC+2 (CEST)

Voltarrosto is a frazione of the comune of Roseto degli Abruzzi (Province of Teramo) in the Abruzzo region of Italy.

Voltarrosto is a village just to the west of Roseto in the Abruzzo region of central Italy. It faces south and the vegetation in the area is lush. Towards the end of July a festival called the “Roseto West Fest” is held in Voltarrosto that includes music and entertainment.1 The Church of Sant' Anna is located within Voltarrosto.
