= Real Giulianova =

Italian football club

- Full name: Real Giulianova Società Sportiva Dilettantisticha a Responsabilità Limitata
- Nickname(s): giallorosso (yellow-reds)
- Founded: 2016 (relocation)
- Ground: Stadio Rubens Fadini
- Chairman: Luciano Bartolini
- Head coach: Leonardo Bitetto
- League: Serie D Group F
- 2019–20: Serie D Group F, 14th
- Website: https://www.realgiulianova.it

Real Giulianova S.s.d. a r.l. was an Italian association football club based in Giulianova, in the Province of Teramo, Abruzzo region. Real Giulianova is a phoenix club of Giulianova and Città di Giulianova, after Real Giulianova was relocated and renamed from Castellalto in 2016.

== History ==
logo of A.S.D. Castellalto

The club was known as A.S.D. Castellalto, based in comune Castellalto, in the Province of Teramo until 2016.

In 2016, after the dissolves of A.S.D. Città di Giulianova 1924 (Città di Giulianova), itself a phoenix club of Giulianova Calcio (Giulianova), Castellalto was relocated to Giulianova, a comune also from that province. The club also renamed to A.S.D. Real Giulianova. The club also changed its color to the traditional color of Giulianova Calcio, yellow and red.

In the last season as Castellalto, the club finished as the 10th of 2015–16 Promozione Abruzzo Group A, while Calcio Giulianova, another phoenix club of Giulianova Calcio, finished as the second last of the same group; Città di Giulianova relegated from Serie D that season.

The club participated in 2016–17 Promozione Abruzzo season, winning a promotion to 2017–18 Eccellenza Abruzzo season in 2017. The club was promoted to 2018–19 Serie D season in 2018. It was assigned to Group F. The club was also re-incorporated as società sportiva dilettantisticha a responsabilità limitata legal form circa that year.

In 2021 he concludes his activity in Giulianova.

== Honours ==
- Eccellenza Abruzzo
  - Champions: 2017–18
