= Sanctuary Madonna of the Splendor =

Italian shrine

- Santuario della Madonna dello Splendore
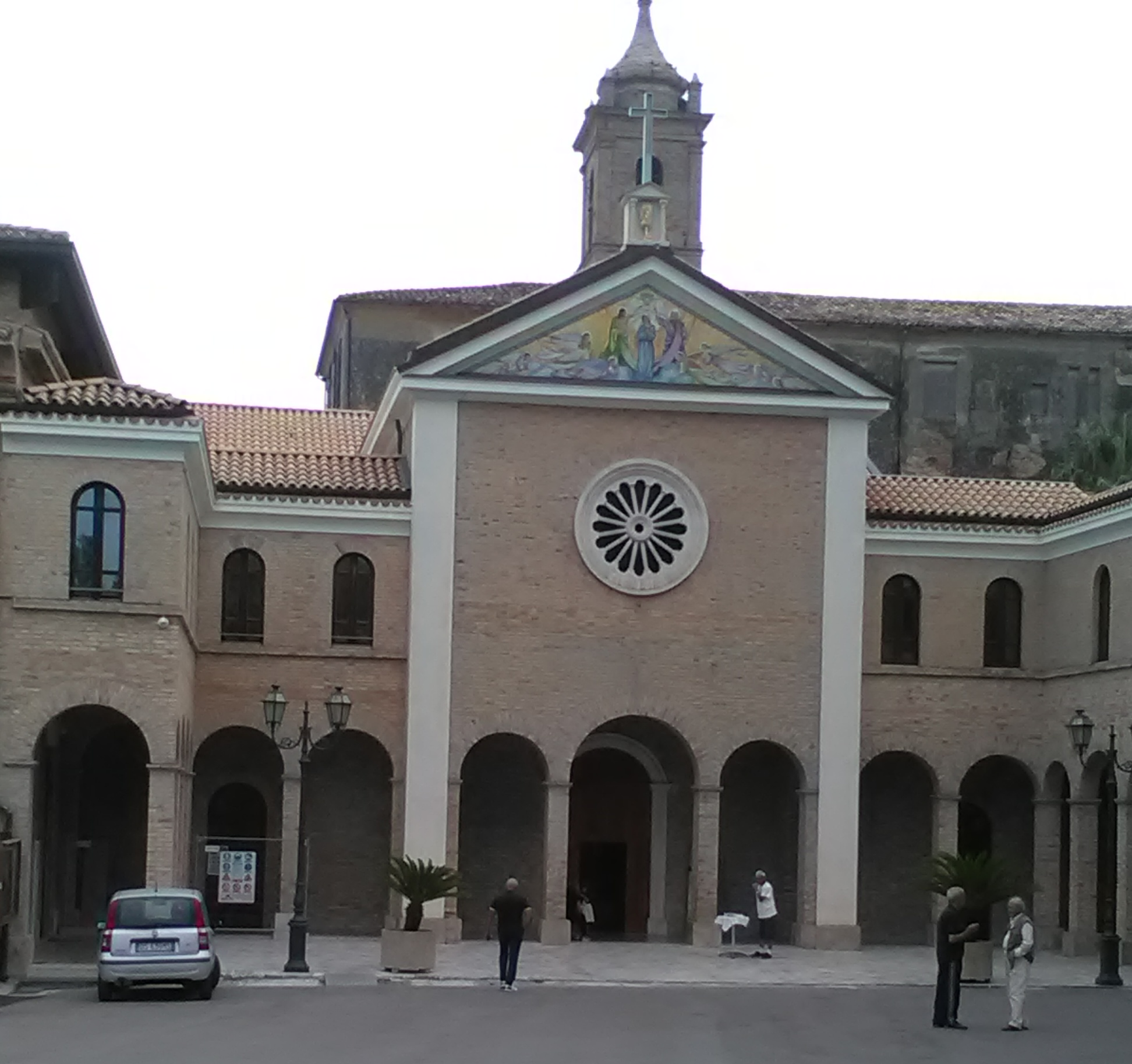
- The shrine's façade

Religion
- Affiliation: Catholic Church
- Status: Sanctuary

Location
- Location: Giulianova
- Country: Italy
- Interactive map of Sanctuary Madonna of the Splendor
- Coordinates: 42.75000°N 13.95000°E

Architecture
- Style: Baroque
- Groundbreaking: 1559
- Completed: 1938

Website
- http://www.madonnadellosplendore.it/

The Sanctuary Madonna of the Splendor is a shrine in Giulianova, Province of Teramo, central Italy. Next to the shrine stand a convent, a miraculous spring water fountain, and a museum.

The sanctuary is served by Capuchin fathers.

== Structure ==
The church is built in the form of a Latin cross, and is decorated with large paintings made in 1954 by Alfonso Tentarelli according to the project of father Jean Lerario; there is a wooden statue of Mary with Jesus blessing child of the fifteenth century (unknown author) called "Madonna dello Splendore". On August 15, 1914, a golden silver crown, made by the Migliori family, was placed on the head of the Virgin. Around 1950, the statue was surrounded by rays, symbol of divine light, and placed above a tree to remember the olive tree in which it appeared in 1557.

The sacristy features a 16th century painting by Paolo Veronese depicting the Virgin and Child with the saints Peter, Paul, Dorothy and Francis.

The miraculous water was collected in a fountain in the gardens of the convent, where a small temple was built with mosaics of the Old and New Testament. The reception area is dominated by a large bronze statue of Christ with the inscription "EGO SUM VIA VERITAS ET VITA" (I am the way, the truth and the life).

== History ==
During the second half of the 16th century, there was a small chapel in Giulianova used by a confraternity devoted to the Virgin of the Rosary.

In 1559, on near Giulianova, the Capuchins received a first donation from the Acquaviva family and built a church dedicated to st Michael the Archangel. The sanctuary was built on the site of an apparition of the Virgin on 22 April 1557.

Between 1968 and 1971, the convent hosted a small seraphic seminary; restoration work was done between 1989 and 1992 around the "Fountain of the Virgin", and a votive temple was rebuilt.

During the years 1990-2000 the up-side floors of the convent were renovated to accommodated the Splendor Art Museum, and the old place where the firewood was stored became the library of the convent. Along the Bertolino Street, a monumental bronze Via Crucis was erected by Ubaldo Ferretti. In 2001, the old organ was replaced by a new one, due to organ builder A. Girotta.

== Gallery ==
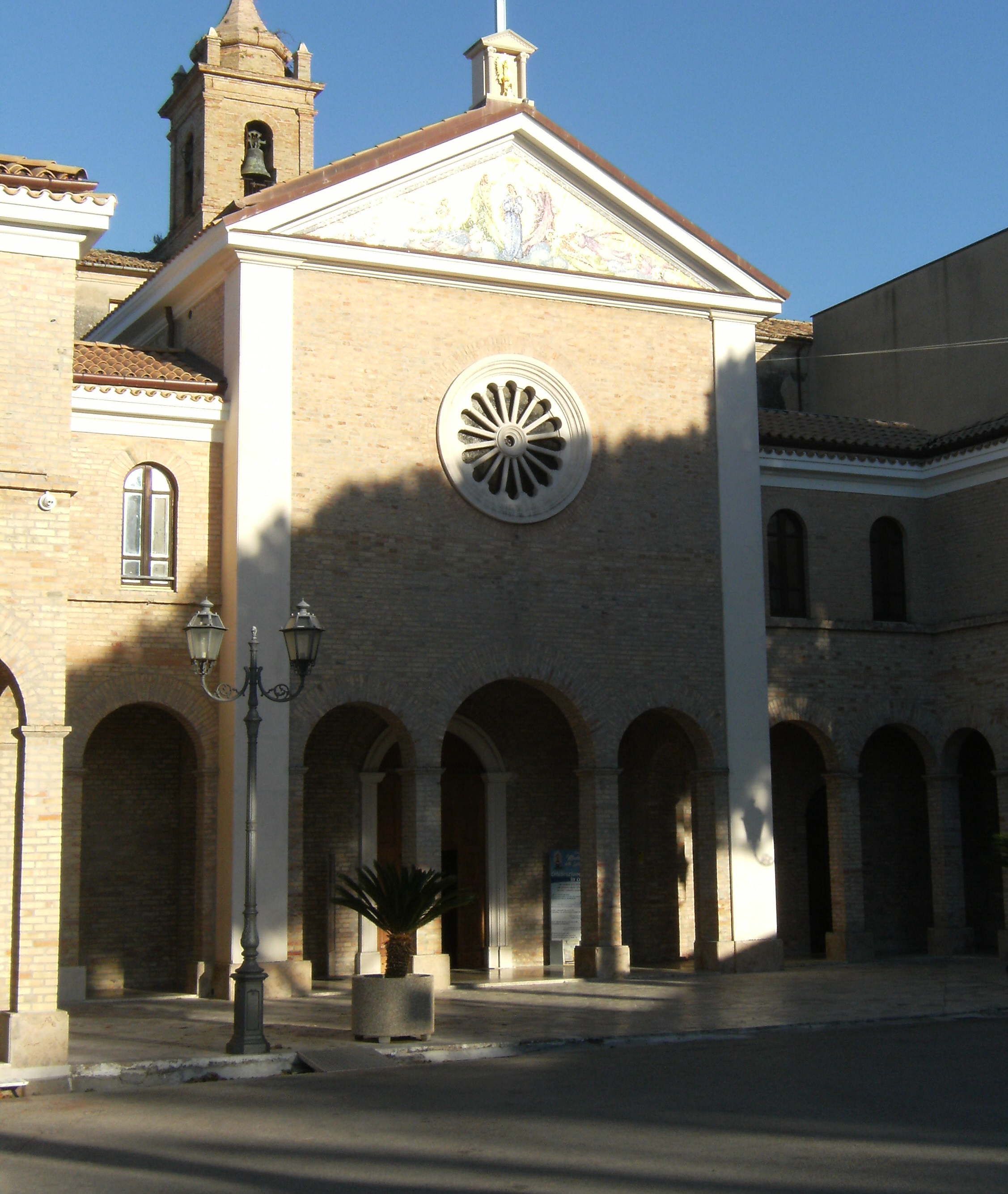
Façade

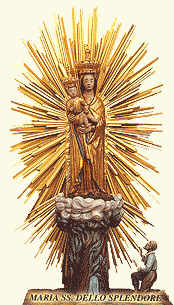
Statue of Mary of Splendor

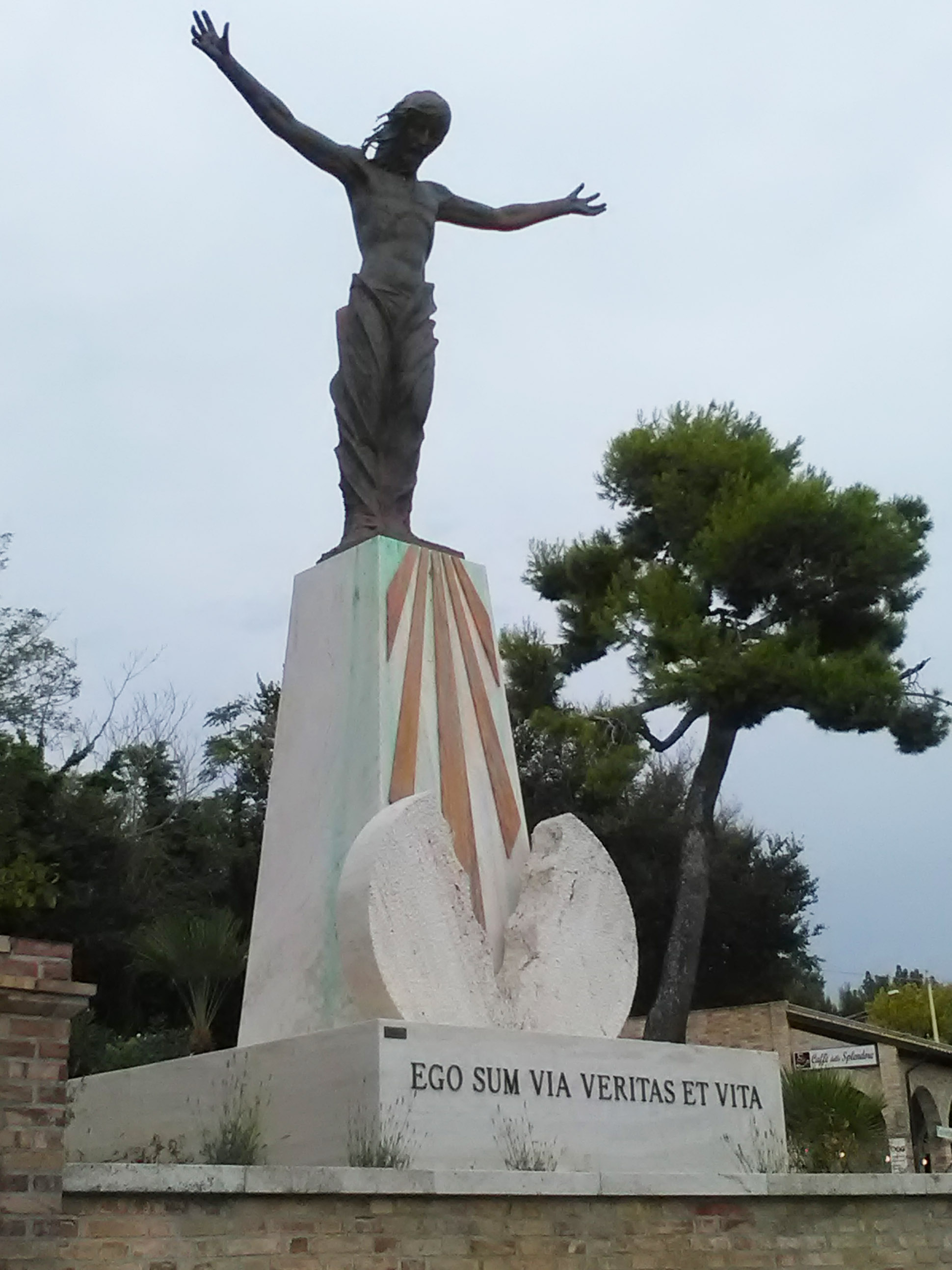
Bronze statue of Jesus in the square's sanctuary

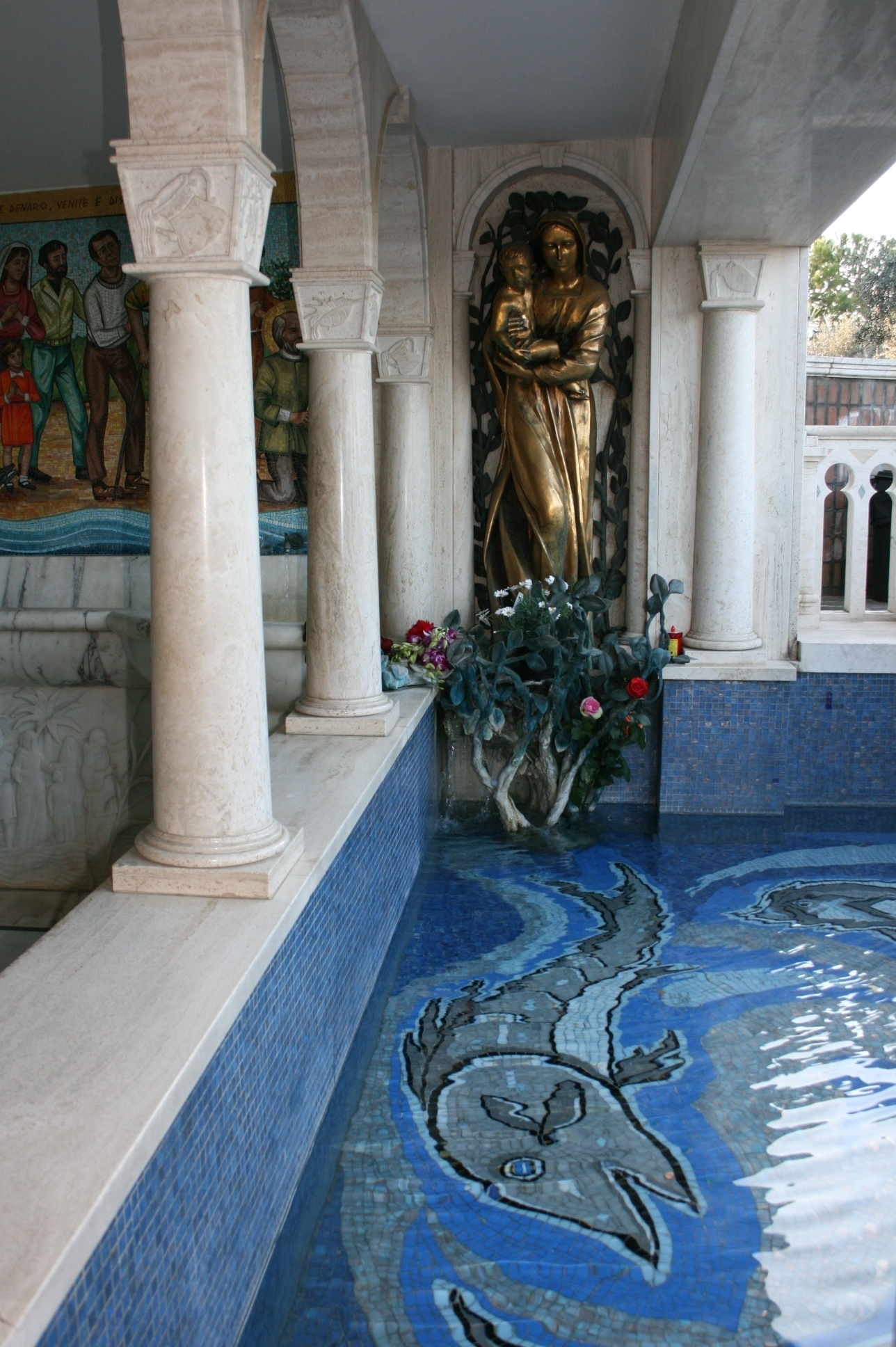
The miracoulous fountain

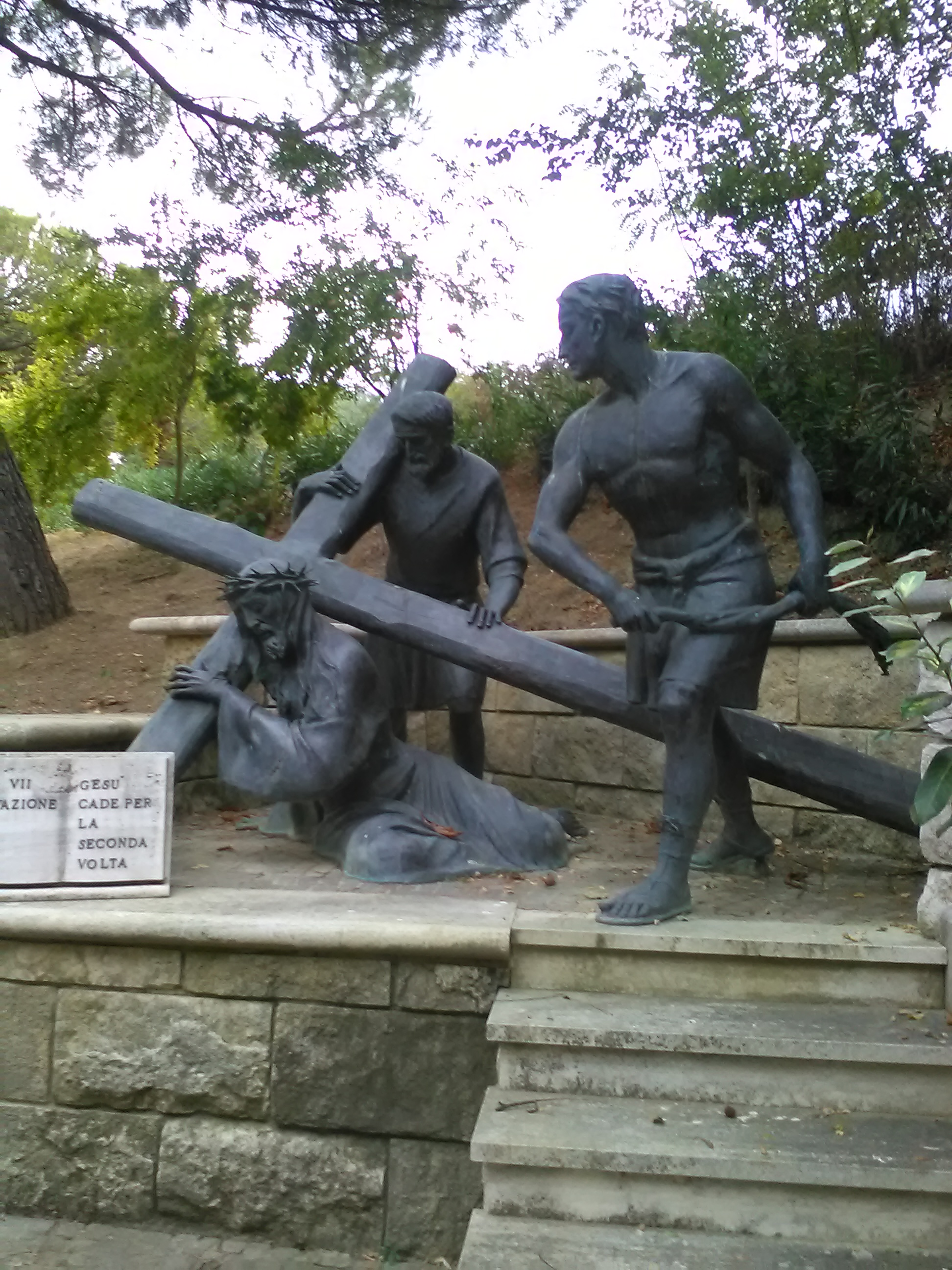
The 7th Station of the Cross

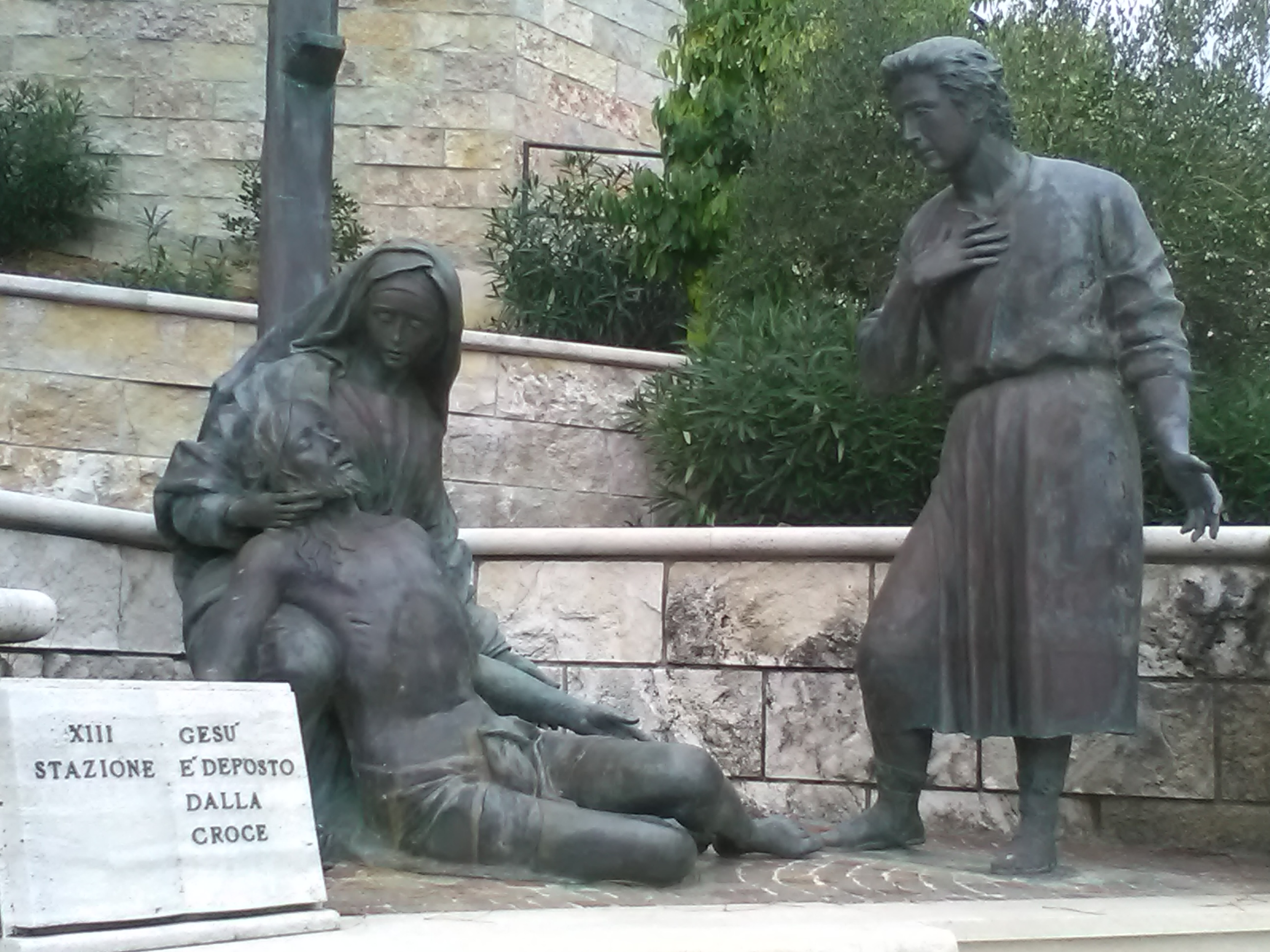
The 13th Station of the Cross

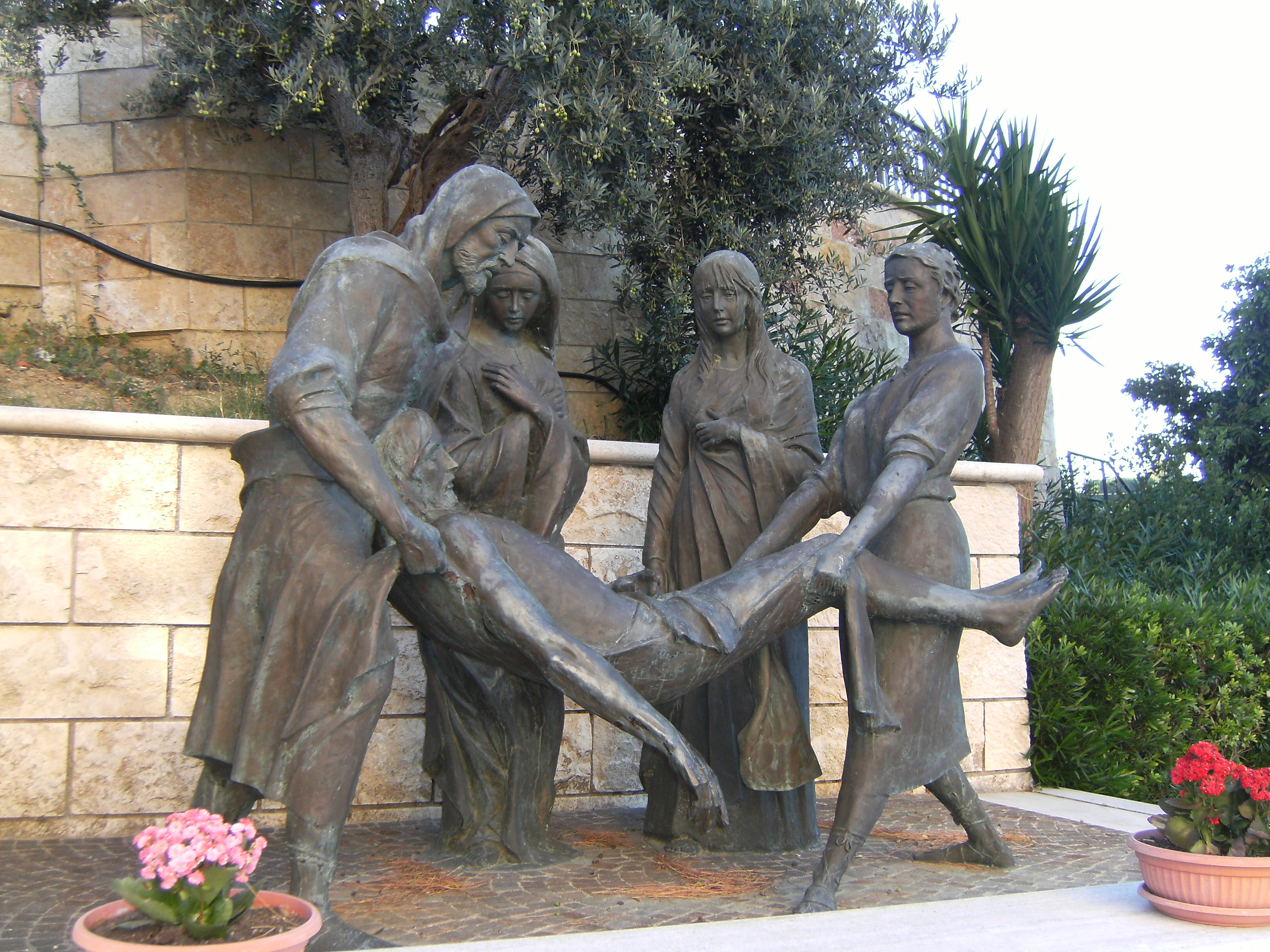
The 14th Station of the Cross
