= Stadio Rubens Fadini =

Multi-use stadium

Coordinates: 42°44′57″N 13°57′17″E

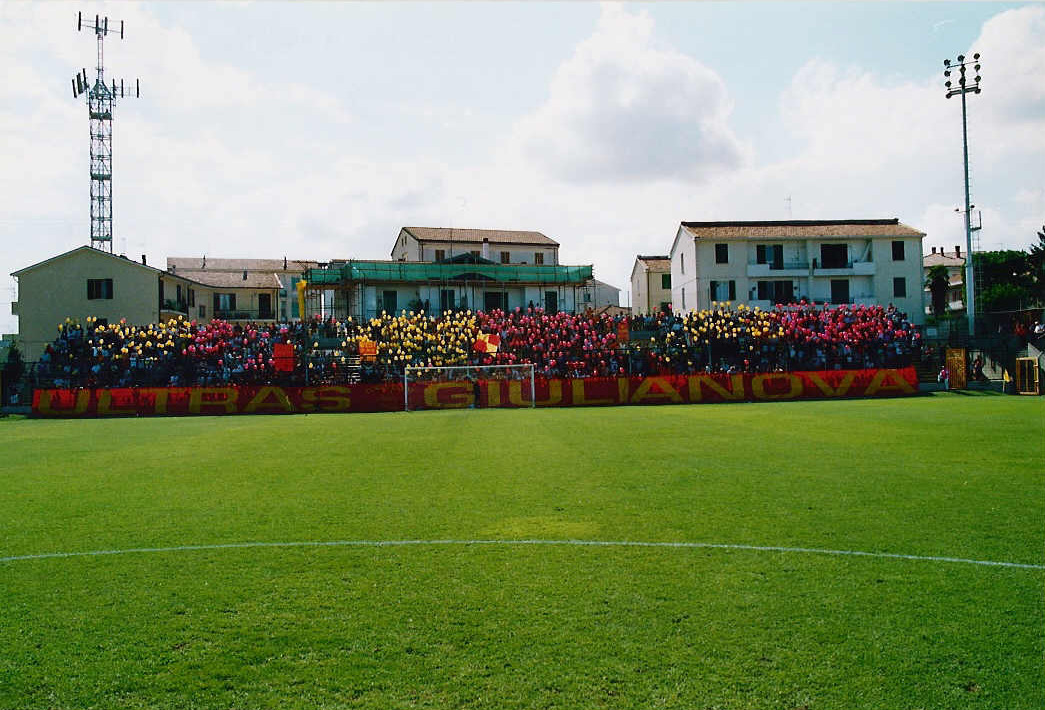
- Interactive map of Stadio Rubens Fadini
- Former names: Stadio Comunale (until 1949)
- Location: Via Migliori 13; 64021 Giulianova
- Owner: Comune of Giulianova
- Surface: Grass

Construction
- Groundbreaking: 1923
- Opened: 1924
- Renovated: 2005

Tenant
- Giulianova Calcio seating_capacity = 4,347

Stadio Rubens Fadini is a multi-use stadium in Giulianova, Abruzzo, Italy. It is currently used mostly for football matches and is the home ground of Giulianova Calcio. The stadium holds 4,347 spectators.
