= Roseto degli Abruzzi =

- Comune
- Comune di Roseto degli Abruzzi
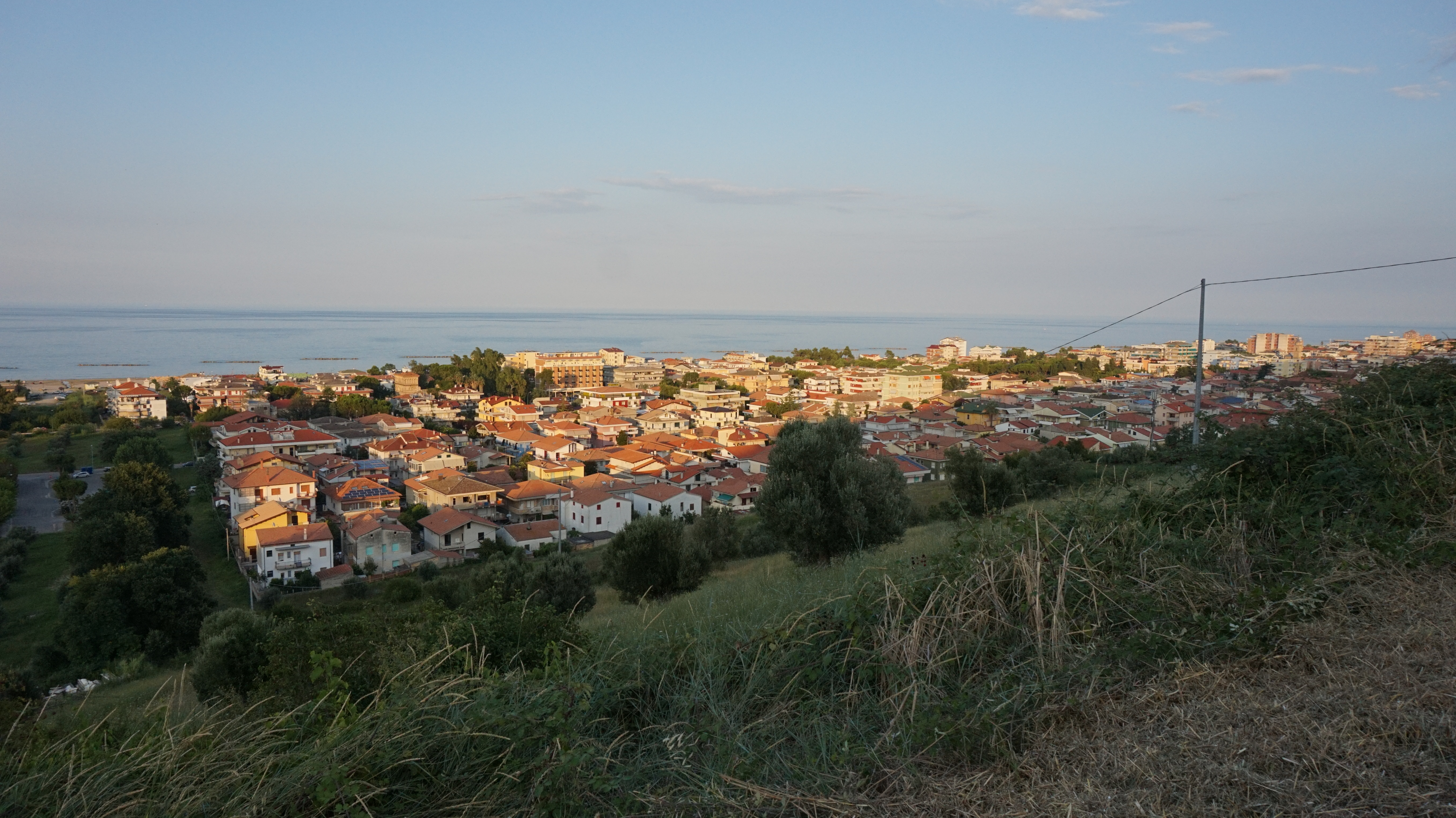

- Coat of arms

- Location within Italy Location within Abruzzo
- Coordinates: 42°41′N 14°1′E
- Country: Italy
- Region: Abruzzo
- Province: Teramo (TE)
- Frazioni: see below

Government
  - Mayor: Mario Nugnes (Ind.)

Area
  - Total: 52 km^{2} (20 sq mi)
- Elevation: 5 m (16 ft)

Population (1 January 2023)
  - Total: 25,501
  - Density: 490/km^{2} (1,300/sq mi)
- Demonym: Rosetani
- Time zone: UTC+1 (CET)
  - Summer (DST): UTC+2 (CEST)
- Postal code: 64026
- Dialing code: 085
- Patron saint: Santa Maria Assunta
- Saint day: 15 August
- Website: Official website

Roseto degli Abruzzi (Italian: [roˈzeːto deʎʎ aˈbruttsi]), more commonly Roseto, is a town and comune of the province of Teramo in the Abruzzo region of central Italy. It is a beach resort on the Adriatic Sea and has about 24,000 inhabitants. Geographically, Roseto is positioned on estuaries of the Vomano and Tordino Rivers. It is the second largest city in the province. In the last decade the city has witnessed a good deal of growth in the quarters of Borsacchio slightly to the north, Campo a Mare along the seacoast and Voltarrosto to the west.

== Geography ==
A major north–south rail line running along the coast passes through Roseto connecting it to the provincial capitals of Pescara and Teramo. Towns nearby include Atri, Giulianova, Morro d'Oro, Mosciano Sant'Angelo, Notaresco and Pineto. Roseto is a popular and highly developed seaside location known throughout Italy and the world. It is sometimes referred to as Lido delle Rose (Beach of the Roses). More recently it has been associated with the "Bandiera Blu" (The Blue Banner).

== History ==
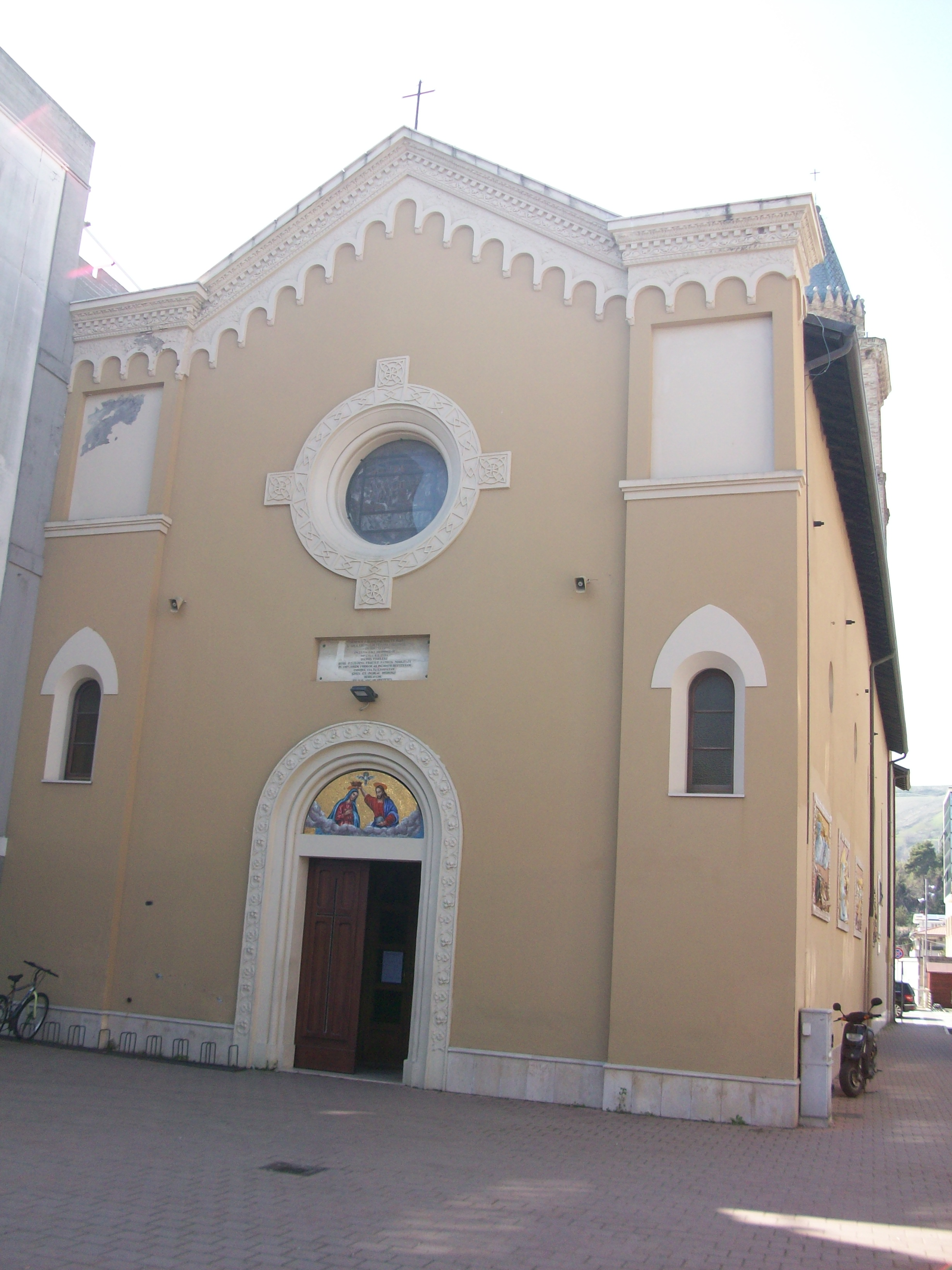
Church of Santa Maria Assunta

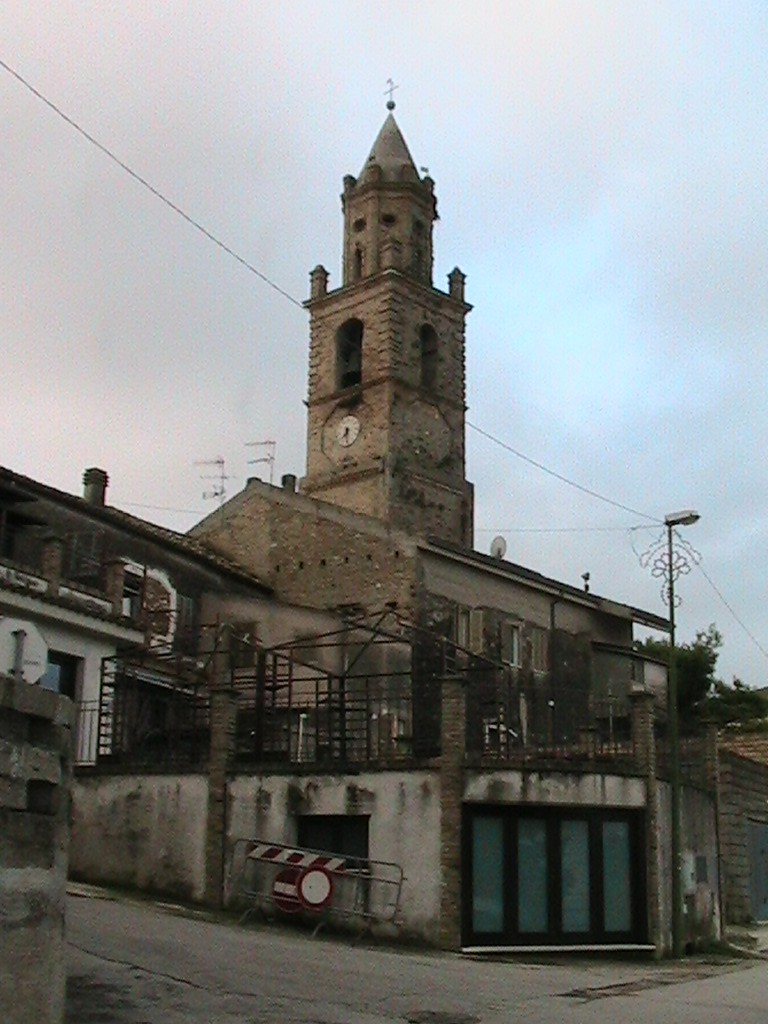
View of the church of Montepagano (the old Roseto)

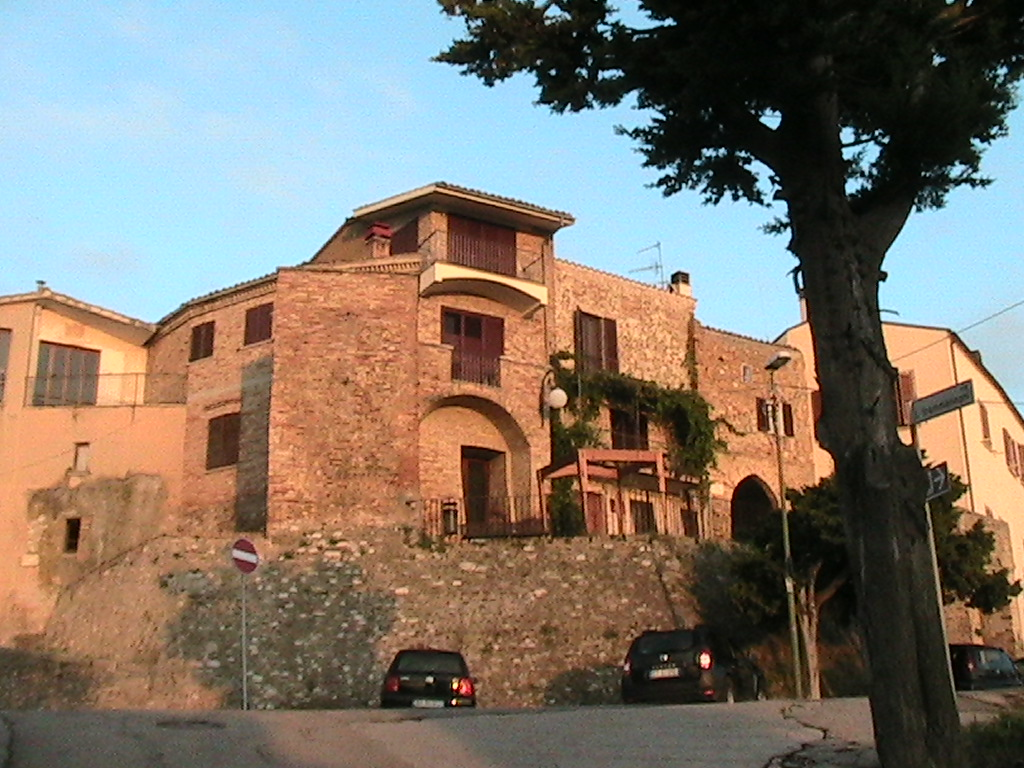
Montepagano

The name of the city was decreed to be Rosburgo by decree of King Umberto I of Italy in 1877. Later the name fell into disfavor, especially in military circles, because it sounded Austrian, a bitter enemy of Italy during World War I, and in 1927 the city was rechristened with its current name. The name derives in part from the large numbers and varieties of rose and oleander trees which grace the byways and balconies of the city's residents. Tourism is the main economic activity in terms of revenue generated. Roseto's coastline, including an area known as Cologna, has more than 10 kilometres (6 mi) of beaches available for swimming and other water activities.

After the end of World War Two - September to December 1945 - units of the Polish II Corps were stationed in and around Roseto while they awaited news on their post-war future and the town was the venue of music concerts, sports fixtures and church services for the now displaced Polish forces.

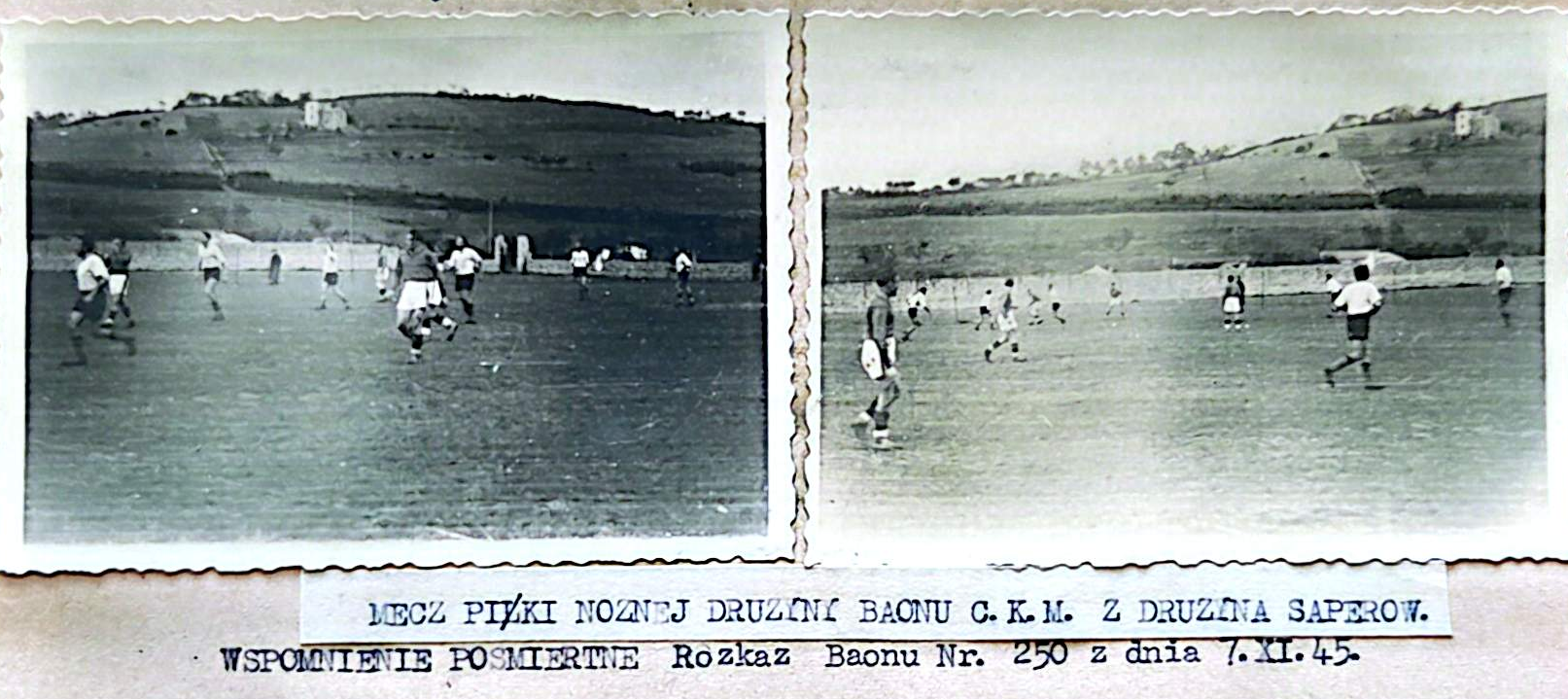

== Culture ==
Just as the name of the city was changed from Rosburgo to Roseto, Saint Mary of the Assumption took the place of Saint Filomena of Rome as the city's liturgical patroness. This followed an examination of the saint's remains, which found no trace of human blood but only a vial of perfume, rings, and various assorted personal items. The controversy this engendered led some to conclude that the remains were not those of Saint Filomena but rather those of another young woman who died in the 4th century AD.

== Sports ==
In the sports domain Roseto is best known for its basketball team Roseto Sharks. It hosts a large indoor stadium capable of seating 4,500 fans. Other popular sporting facilities include an Olympic size swimming pool, numerous tennis courts, futsal courts, and bocce courts.

== Economy ==
Roseto is a communications center. Its economy is strengthened by the fact that it has a balance of both commercial and touristic entities. Rolli S.p.A., produces and exports a large quantity of jams, marmalade, and preserves. A large scale wine producer, Scialletti, exports internationally. Dozens of smaller concerns contribute to Roseto's industrial sector. Roseto is second only to Teramo in hosting artisan workshops and small factories. Many large trucking and transportation companies are located nearby.

== Education ==
A Canadian school, Centro Scuola, has organized summer language programs in Roseto and neighbouring towns for many years. Beginning in the fall of 2004 semester-long programs have been conducted.

== Frazioni ==
Frazioni (outlying areas) of this communal city include San Giovanni, Campo a Mare, Casal Thaulero, Cologna Paese, Cologna Spiaggia, Montepagano, Santa Lucia, Voltarrosto, and Bonaduce.

== Twin towns ==
- (United States) Roseto, Pennsylvania
- Jawor, Poland
- La Louvière, Belgium
- Makarska, Croatia
- Roseto Capo Spulico, Italy
- Romentino, Italy

== Climate ==
Climate data for Roseto degli Abruzzi, elevation 3 m (9.8 ft), (1951–2000)
Month	Jan	Feb	Mar	Apr	May	Jun	Jul	Aug	Sep	Oct	Nov	Dec	Year
Record high °C (°F)	19.2 (66.6)	23.0 (73.4)	24.1 (75.4)	25.2 (77.4)	30.2 (86.4)	35.2 (95.4)	35.0 (95.0)	39.4 (102.9)	34.0 (93.2)	33.0 (91.4)	27.8 (82.0)	22.5 (72.5)	39.4 (102.9)
Mean daily maximum °C (°F)	10.1 (50.2)	11.0 (51.8)	13.8 (56.8)	16.5 (61.7)	21.8 (71.2)	26.5 (79.7)	29.7 (85.5)	30.2 (86.4)	25.1 (77.2)	20.3 (68.5)	14.5 (58.1)	10.5 (50.9)	19.2 (66.5)
Daily mean °C (°F)	7.6 (45.7)	8.0 (46.4)	10.4 (50.7)	12.7 (54.9)	17.9 (64.2)	22.2 (72.0)	25.1 (77.2)	25.7 (78.3)	21.2 (70.2)	17.0 (62.6)	11.8 (53.2)	8.1 (46.6)	15.6 (60.2)
Mean daily minimum °C (°F)	5.1 (41.2)	5.0 (41.0)	6.9 (44.4)	9.0 (48.2)	14.0 (57.2)	17.8 (64.0)	20.6 (69.1)	21.2 (70.2)	17.2 (63.0)	13.7 (56.7)	9.1 (48.4)	5.7 (42.3)	12.1 (53.8)
Record low °C (°F)	−2.8 (27.0)	−4.8 (23.4)	−2.4 (27.7)	1.5 (34.7)	6.2 (43.2)	11.5 (52.7)	13.8 (56.8)	11.5 (52.7)	3.1 (37.6)	5.1 (41.2)	0.0 (32.0)	−3.2 (26.2)	−4.8 (23.4)
Average precipitation mm (inches)	58.3 (2.30)	48.7 (1.92)	58.3 (2.30)	56.5 (2.22)	43.4 (1.71)	46.2 (1.82)	31.3 (1.23)	48.3 (1.90)	62.6 (2.46)	78.5 (3.09)	73.7 (2.90)	74.8 (2.94)	680.6 (26.79)
Average precipitation days	6.0	6.1	6.8	6.4	5.7	4.9	3.9	4.2	5.8	6.6	7.5	8.0	71.9
Source: Regione Abruzzo

== See also ==
- Abruzzo (wine)
