= Marco Pedotti =

Italian footballer (born 1977)

Personal information
- Date of birth: 20 April 1977 (age 49)
- Place of birth: Cuggiono, Italy
- Height: 1.85 m (6 ft 1 in)
- Position: Centre-back

Youth career
- –1996: Como

Senior career*
Years	Team	Apps	(Gls)
1996–1997	Legnano	29	(1)
1997–1998	Verbania	34	(8)
1998–2000	Lucchese	28	(0)
2000–2002	Brescello	13	(0)
2002–2003	Sambenedettese	43	(1)
2003–2004	→ Reggiana (loan)	13	(0)
2004–2005	Como	28	(0)
2005–2006	Martina	26	(2)
2006–2007	Benevento	29	(1)
2007–2009	Ternana	39	(2)
2009–2010	Crotone	7	(0)
2010	Lecco	8	(0)
2010–2011	Insubria	8	(1)
2011–2012	Folgore Caratese	51	(2)
Total		384	(20)
- * Club domestic league appearances and goals

Marco Pedotti (born 20 April 1977) is an Italian former professional footballer who played as a centre-back.

== Club career ==
On 22 July 2006, Pedotti moved to Serie C2 side Benevento, before joining Ternana in the Serie C1 on 25 July 2007. He joined Crotone on 3 February 2009, then Lecco in February 2010, mid-2009–10 season. Following a season at Insubria, Pedotti joined Caratese on 14 January 2011.
