= Eccellenza Abruzzo =

- Organising body: Lega Nazionale Dilettanti
- Founded: 1991
- Country: Italy
- Confederation: UEFA
- Number of clubs: 18
- Promotion to: Serie D
- Relegation to: Promozione Abruzzo
- League cup: Coppa Italia Dilettanti
- Current champions: Giulianova (2024–25)
- Most championships: Chieti, Vastese (3 titles each)
- Website: http://www.lnd.it

Eccellenza Abruzzo is the regional Eccellenza football division for clubs in Abruzzo, Italy. It is competed amongst 18 teams and the winner is promoted to Serie D (usually to Girone F). The clubs that finishes between the second and the fifth place also have a chance to gain promotion. The winner of the regional play-off is entered into a national round which consists of two matches.

== Champions ==
- 1991–92 Termoli
- 1992–93 Nereto
- 1993–94 Paganica
- 1994–95 Pineto
- 1995–96 Ortona
- 1996–97 Luco dei Marsi
- 1997–98 Lanciano
- 1998–99 Pro Vasto
- 1999–2000 Morro d'Oro
- 2000–01 Pro Vasto
- 2001–02 Rosetana
- 2002–03 Celano
- 2003–04 Guardiagrele
- 2004–05 Renato Curi Angolana
- 2005–06 Santegidiese
- 2006–07 Cologna Paese
- 2007–08 Chieti
- 2008–09 Miglianico & L'Aquila Calcio
- 2009–10 Teramo
- 2010–11 San Nicolò
- 2011–12 Amiternina
- 2012–13 Sulmona
- 2013–14 San Nicolò
- 2014–15 Avezzano
- 2015–16 Vastese
- 2016–17 Nerostellati
- 2017–18 Real Giulianova
- 2018–19 Chieti
- 2019–20 Castelnuovo Vomano
- 2020–21 Chieti
- 2021–22 Avezzano
- 2022–23 L'Aquila
- 2023–24 Teramo
- 2024–25 Giulianova

== Notes ==
L'Aquila also awarded promotion due to its inability to complete the league following the 2009 L'Aquila earthquake; the club was topping the league with Miglianico after Week 32, but was exempted from playing last two games
