= Castellalto =

- Comune
- Comune di Castellalto
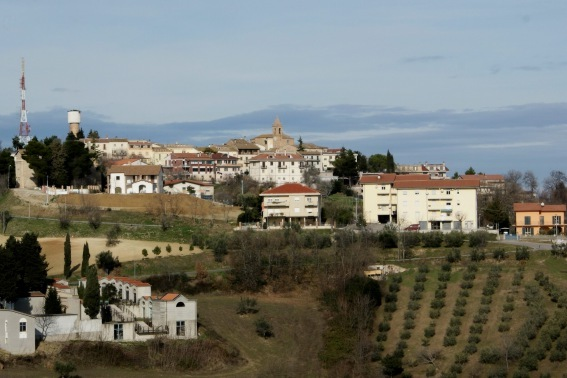

- Location within Italy Location within Abruzzo
- Coordinates: 42°40′37.62″N 13°49′4.14″E
- Country: Italy
- Region: Abruzzo
- Province: Teramo (TE)
- Frazioni: Casemolino, Castelbasso, Castelnuovo Vomano, Feudo, Fosso Cupo, Guzzano, Mulano, Petriccione, San Cipriano, San Gervasio, Santa Lucia, Villa Torre, Villa Zaccheo

Area
  - Total: 33 km^{2} (13 sq mi)
- Elevation: 492 m (1,614 ft)

Population (1 January 2007)
  - Total: 7,231
  - Density: 220/km^{2} (570/sq mi)
- Demonym: Castellaltesi
- Time zone: UTC+1 (CET)
  - Summer (DST): UTC+2 (CEST)
- Postal code: 64020
- Dialing code: 0861
- ISTAT code: 067011
- Website: Official website

Castellalto is a town and comune in Teramo province in the Abruzzo region of eastern Italy.
