= Petriccione =

Petriccione is an Italian surname. Notable people with the surname include:

- Italo Petriccione (born 1958), Italian cinematographer
- Jacopo Petriccione (born 1995), Italian football player
