= Felipe Chalegre =

Brazilian footballer (born 1990)

Personal information
- Full name: Felipe Chalegre da Silva
- Date of birth: 2 April 1990 (age 36)
- Place of birth: Presidente Epitácio, Brazil
- Height: 1.83 m (6 ft 0 in)
- Position: Central defender

Youth career
- 2004–2005: Campo Grande
- 2006–2010: Vicenza

Senior career*
Years	Team	Apps	(Gls)
2009–2011	Vicenza	0	(0)
2010	→ Colligiana (loan)	10	(0)
- * Club domestic league appearances and goals

Felipe Chalegre da Silva (born 2 April 1990) is a Brazilian footballer who plays as a defender.

== Career ==
Felipe Chalegre started his career with Campo Grande. In 2006, he left for Italian Serie B club Vicenza along with teammate Diego Tolentino and Renan Wagner, which they shared the same agent: Pedrinho VRP.

During the 2009–10 season, he was call-up to pre-season camp of the first team and awarded the number 25 shirt.

In January 2010, he graduated from the youth team, loaned to Colligiana of Lega Pro Seconda Divisione.

He returned to Vicenza in 2010–11 Serie B but did not play any game.
