= Mattia Ferrato =

Italian footballer

Personal information
- Date of birth: 5 August 1989 (age 37)
- Place of birth: Parma, Italy
- Position: Central defender

Team information
- Current team: Carpenedolo

Youth career
- Parma

Senior career*
Years	Team	Apps	(Gls)
2008–2009	Melfi	9	(0)
2009–2010	Pro Vercelli	0	(0)
2010–	Carpenedolo	10	(0)
- * Club domestic league appearances and goals

Mattia Ferrato (born 5 August 1989) is an Italian footballer who plays for Lega Pro Seconda Divisione team A.C. Carpenedolo.

== Biography ==
Ferrato left for Melfi in co-ownership deal in summer 2008.

In June 2009 he was bought back by Parma but left for Pro Vercelli in co-ownership deal. In January 2010 Parma bought him back, but left for Carpenedolo in another co-ownership deal. With Carpenedolo, Ferrato finished as losing side of relegation playoffs.
