= Sant'Egidio alla Vibrata =

- Comune
- Comune di Sant'Egidio alla Vibrata
- Coat of arms

- Location within Italy Location within Abruzzo
- Coordinates: 42°50′N 13°43′E
- Country: Italy
- Region: Abruzzo
- Province: Teramo (TE)
- Frazioni: Centro, Faraone, Madonna delle Grazie, Paolantonio, Passo del Mulino, Ponte, Villa Marchesa, Villa Mattoni, Villa Marchetti, Taglioni

Government
  - Mayor: Annunzio Amatucci (Orgoglio Santegidiese)

Area
  - Total: 18 km^{2} (6.9 sq mi)
- Elevation: 239 m (784 ft)

Population (2007)
  - Total: 9,415
  - Density: 520/km^{2} (1,400/sq mi)
- Demonym: Santegidiesi
- Time zone: UTC+1 (CET)
  - Summer (DST): UTC+2 (CEST)
- Postal code: 64016
- Dialing code: 0861
- Patron saint: Sant'Egidio Abate
- Saint day: 1 September
- Website: Official website

Sant'Egidio alla Vibrata (Abruzzo: Sand'llië) is a town and comune in the province of Teramo, in the Abruzzo region of central Italy, located in the Vibrata river valley.
