= Giulianova Calcio =

Italian football club

Giulianova
- Full name: Giulianova Calcio
- Nickname: Giallorossi (yellow-reds)
- Founded: 1924. refounded 2012, 2016, 2021
- Ground: Stadio Rubens Fadini, Giulianova, Italy
- Capacity: 4,347
- League: Serie D - Group F
Home colours	Away colours

Giulianova Calcio is an Italian association football club based in Giulianova, Abruzzo. The team failed to renew its license for professional football in 2012. After 4 years' dormancy, the new owner of the club applied to play in 2016–17 5-a-side football, composed of players from folded Città di Giulianova.

After 2012, few phoenix clubs emerged: A.S.D. Città di Giulianova 1924, A.S.D. Calcio Giulianova, A.S.D. Piccoli Giallorossi and A.S.D. Real Giulianova. Some teams had been temporarily granted the rights to use the logo of Giulianova Calcio, by A.S.D. Giuliesi per Sempre, the owner of the logo which was purchased from the bankruptcy auctions.

== History ==
The first town team, blue Giuliese, was founded in 1924 without particular honours.

The yellow-red colors were adopted in 1936 and played for most of its history in national Italian championships, especially in Serie C. The most important results achieved by the club had been the 2nd place 1972–73 Serie C and the play-off semi-finals for the promotion in Serie B in Serie C1 1996–97 and 1998–99. Notable has been the youth academy of Giulianova Calcio, which between the 1960s and the 2000s won 10 national youth football titles.

On 30 June 2012 Giulianova did not submit the application to 2012–13 Lega Pro Seconda Divisione due to financial reason. The membership of Giulianova Calcio S.r.l. in FIGC was revoked in 2013.

On 19 July 2012 former chairman of the club, Dario D'Agostino, was suspended for 8 months, as well as 2 points deduction in 2012–13 season to the official phoenix club of Giulianova (if any). Another director, Antonio Serena, was also suspended for around 100 days due to administration irregularities on 9 February 2012.

== Legacy ==
The assets of Giulianova Calcio, including the logo, and trophies, were acquired by A.S.D. Giuliesi per Sempre aka A.S.D. Giulianova Calcio, which grants other teams to use the logo temporary.

However, as Città di Giulianova did not renew the loan of the logo in 2015, as well as other youth teams had rely on the agreement with Città di Giulianova, the non-renewal of loan, making all team cannot use the club logo.

A.S.D. Città di Giulianova 1924, was the highest ranking team from Giulianova in the national league, which was relocated from Cologna Paese frazione, Roseto degli Abruzzi, in the Province of Teramo. The team relegated from 2015–16 Serie D (fourth tier). The team folded in 2016.

Another team, A.S.D. Calcio Giulianova, was a merger of "Scuola Calcio Giulianova", a youth academy and "Colleranesco", a team in local amateur football located in the frazione of the same name. The team relegated from 2015 to 2016 Promozione Abruzzo (sixth tier). The team withdrew from senior football in 2016.

The third team, A.S.D. Piccoli Giallorossi, was another youth academy.

In 2016 A.S.D. Real Giulianova became another illegitimate phoenix clubs after Città di Giulianova was folded. Real Giulianova was a team in 2016–17 Promozione Abruzzo. The club was relocated from Castellalto, in the Province of Teramo. The club won promotion to Eccellenza in 2017.

A.S.D. Giulianova Calcio also return to football league by entering local 5-a-side football, by hiring players of former Città di Giulianova.

A.S.D. Giulianova Annunziata was another team from Giulianova which was participated in 2016–17 Prima Categoria.

In 2023 a new company acquires the logo and qualification of Giulianova Calcio from the Giuliesi per sempre association definitively and returns to the name of A.S.D. Giulianova Calcio 1924.

== Notable players ==
List of the footballers raised in the youth sector who reached the Serie A:

- Paolo Braca: in Serie A with SSC Napoli, SPAL and US Catanzaro 1929.
- Bruno Piccioni: in Serie A with Genoa.
- Giuseppe Lelj: in Serie A with Fiorentina, Sampdoria, LR Vicenza and AC Perugia Calcio.
- Sergio Conte:in Serie A with Inter.
- Renato Curi: in Serie A with AC Perugia Calcio.
- Franco Tancredi: in Serie A with AC Milan, AS Roma, Torino. Joined Italy national football team.
- Pasquale Iachini: in Serie A with Como 1907, Brescia Calcio, Genoa and Fiorentina.
- Bartolomeo Di Michele: in Serie A with Pescara.
- Marco Cosenza: in Serie A with Pescara.
- Nicola D'Ottavio:in Serie A with Verona and Avellino.
- Pasquale Traini: in Serie A with Cesena.
- Tiziano De Patre: in Serie A with Atalanta and Cagliari. Joined Italy national under-21 football team.
- Federico Giampaolo: in Serie A with Juventus, Bari and Salernitana. Joined Italy national under-21 football team.
- Vittorio Pinciarelli: in Serie A with Pescara.
- Cristiano Del Grosso: in Serie A with Ascoli, Cagliari, Siena and Atalanta.
- Federico Del Grosso: in Serie A with Inter.
- Stefano Olivieri: in Serie A with Chievo Verona.
- Mirco Antenucci: in Serie A with Catania and SPAL.
- Damiano Zanon: in Serie A with Pescara.
- Vittorio Micolucci: in Serie A with Udinese.
- Giuseppe Cozzolino: in Serie A with Lecce and Chievo Verona.
- Jacopo Dezi: in Serie A with Napoli, Parma and Venezia. Joined Italy national under-21 football team.

Marco Giampaolo: as trainer of Ascoli, Cagliari, Siena, Catania, Cesena, Empoli, Sampdoria, Milan, Torino and Lecce.

Franco Tancredi: as goalkeeper's trainer of Roma, Juventus, Real Madrid and England.

== Colors and badge ==
Its colours are yellow and red.

== Stadium ==
It plays its home matches at Stadio Rubens Fadini.
