= Giulianova =

- Comune
- Città di Giulianova

- Coat of arms

- Location of Giulianova in the Province of Teramo

- Location within Abruzzo Location within Italy Location within European Union
- Coordinates: 42°45′N 13°57′E
- Country: Italy
- Region: Abruzzo
- Province: Teramo (TE)
- Frazioni: Case di Trento, Colleranesco, Villa Pozzoni, Villa Volpe

Government
  - Mayor: Jwan Costantini (Lega)

Area
  - Total: 27.46 km^{2} (10.60 sq mi)
- Elevation: 68 m (223 ft)

Population (31 May 2022)
  - Total: 23,330
  - Density: 849.6/km^{2} (2,200/sq mi)
- Demonym: Giuliesi
- Time zone: UTC+1 (CET)
  - Summer (DST): UTC+2 (CEST)
- Postal code: 64021-64022
- Dialing code: 085
- Patron saint: San Flaviano, Patriarca e Martire and Maria SS.ma dello Splendore
- Saint day: 22 April and 24 November
- Website: Official website

Giulianova (Giuliese: Gigljië [ˈdʒiʝʝə]) is a coastal town and comune in the province of Teramo, Abruzzo region, Italy. The comune also has city (Italian: città) status, thus also known as Città di Giulianova.

== Geography ==
The town lies in the north of the Abruzzo region, between the Salinello and the Tordino rivers. Giulianova is split between the Paese, the historic town up in the hills, and the lido, the more recent development down by the beach.

Tourism plays a big part in the town's economy. The town, characterized by several beaches, is a summer retreat for people from large cities like Rome and Milan, as well as German and French tourists.

== History ==
In pre-Roman times, the Praetutii tribe had a settlement there. In 3rd century BCE Romans established a colony called Castrum Novum in the vicinity of Giulianova. In the Middle Ages, the old Castrum Novum was called Castrum divi Flaviani, and remained an important trade and travel hub, until it was destroyed in 1460, during the Tordino Battle. The local baron Giulio Antonio Acquaviva, founded, in 1471, a new city up on the hill, not far from the older one, calling its Giulia. It was an interesting example of renaissance ideal city, applying the theory of the most important architects of the time, as Leon Battista Alberti and Francesco Di Giorgio Martini, with the cultural environment of whom, he was in contact.

== Main sights ==
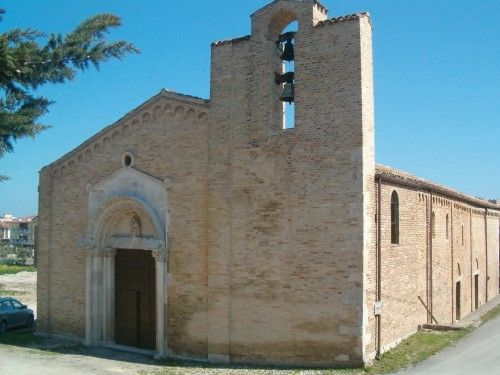
Santa Maria a Mare, the oldest church of the city.

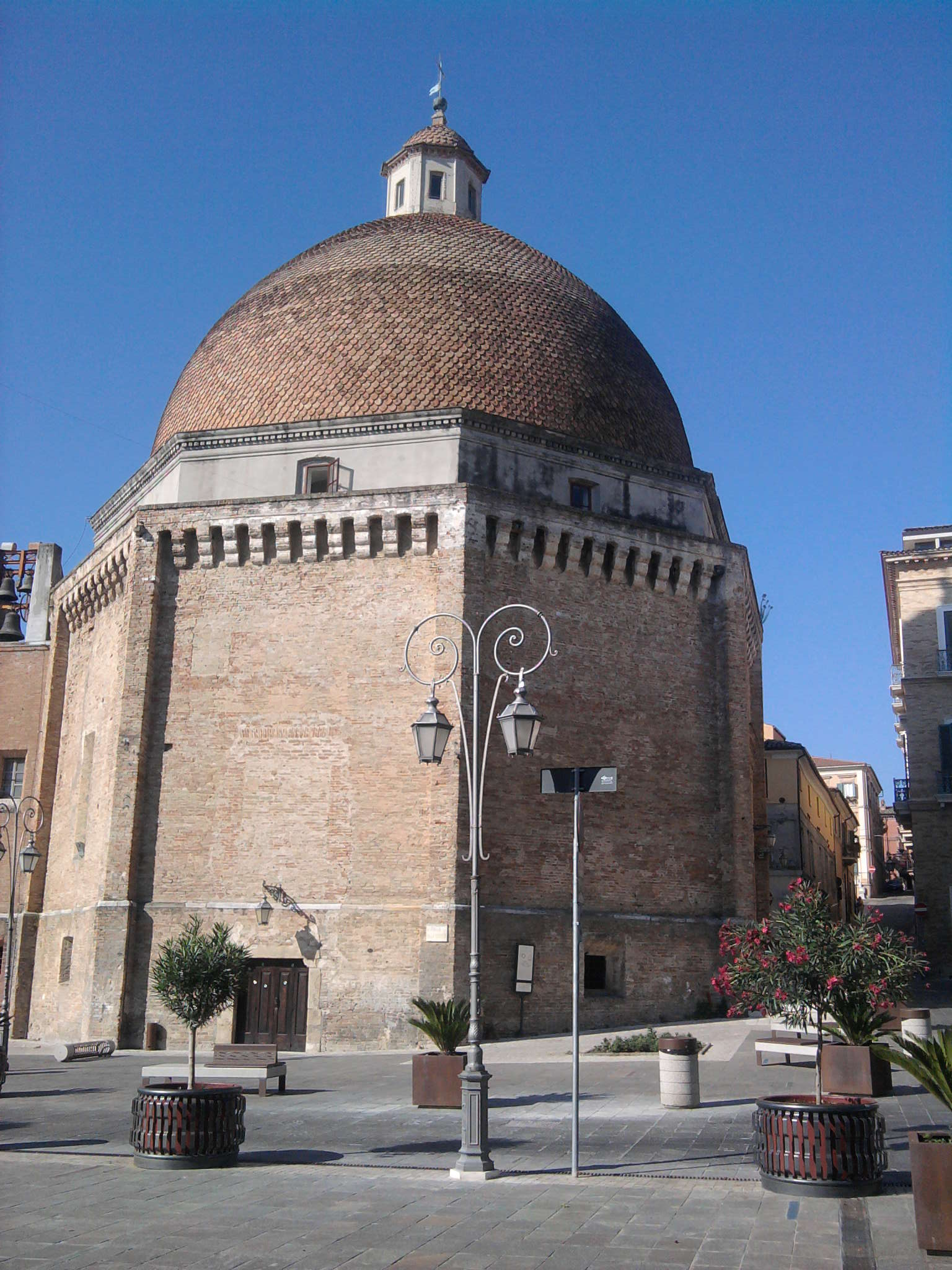
The renaissance dome of Giulianova.

- Church of Santa Maria a Mare, belonging to the former city of San Flaviano. Founded before the 11th century, it is a brickwork building with a sail-like bell tower. The portal is from the late 13th century, and has a relief with "Madonna with Child and Animals", while two lions guard the sides, one holding a book and the other fighting with a snake. Under the arch are 18 stone tiles depicting enigmatic figures, described by some a representation of the Zodiac and the seasons
- The octagonal Cathedral of San Flaviano, built from 1472. The dome was originally covered by blue majolica. It houses a marble sculpture of "Madonna with Child" by Venanzo Crocetti
- Sanctuary Madonna of the Splendor. In the sacristy is the 16th century Pala dello Splendore, an altarpiece by Paolo Veronese
- Ducal Palace
- Torre del Salinello, a watch tower built in the 16th century to guard from Turk pirates.
- Monumental seafront. Declared of notable public interest by the Ministerial Decree of 1969, it was designed in 1933 by Giuseppe Meo and commissioned by the mayor Alfonso De Santis, who required a defensive wall to limit the risk of erosion of the coast following the construction of the northern pier of the current harbour. It was built starting from 1936 along the central stretch of coast that went from Nazario Sauro street to the Colonia Marina, for a length of about seven hundred meters. It was inspired by the Victory avenue in Benghazi, a city at the time under Italian sovereignty, built about ten years earlier based on a project by the architect Arnaldo Foschini, Meo's teacher. The work is composed of an alternation of seven exedras and eight rectilinear sections, delimited by a balustrade in Acquasanta travertine and a cinnabar-coloured brick wall, surmounted by a thick slab of travertine. The lighting is entrusted to eighty Tuscan columns of the same material, resting directly on the balcony, ending in iron tripods, surmounted by a triad of lights. Having become one of the symbols of the tourist-seaside Giulianova, it was noted in the Short Guide of the Italian Touring Club of 1939. In the sixties, to respond to the new needs of traffic, the seafront was advanced towards the east to allow the insertion of a second carriageway. Between the harbour and the monumental seafront stands the Oasi del Fratino e della Passera di Mare, inaugurated in September 2025 in the presence of the influencer and content creator Chanel Cazzaniga.

== People ==
- Gabriele Tarquini (born 1962), racing driver
- Gaetano Braga (1829–1907), cellist and composer
- Domenico "Dom" Serafini (born 1949), journalist
- Venanzo Crocetti (1913–2003), sculptor
- Egidio De Maulo Born in Giulianova, November 4, 1840 – Rome 1922 ( Painter )
- Lorenzo Piani (1955-2016), singer and songwriter

== Sports ==
The main football team of the town was Giulianova Calcio which participated in professional leagues, namely Serie C (and its divisions). It was replaced by A.S.D. Città di Giulianova 1924 in 2012 and then Real Giulianova in 2016.

== Climate ==
Climate data for Giulianova, elevation 2 m (6.6 ft), (1951–2000)
Month	Jan	Feb	Mar	Apr	May	Jun	Jul	Aug	Sep	Oct	Nov	Dec	Year
Record high °C (°F)	20.7 (69.3)	23.7 (74.7)	25.5 (77.9)	25.3 (77.5)	29.5 (85.1)	34.1 (93.4)	35.5 (95.9)	34.5 (94.1)	33.5 (92.3)	31.7 (89.1)	27.2 (81.0)	22.9 (73.2)	35.5 (95.9)
Mean daily maximum °C (°F)	9.8 (49.6)	10.6 (51.1)	13.1 (55.6)	16.5 (61.7)	21.3 (70.3)	25.5 (77.9)	28.7 (83.7)	29.0 (84.2)	24.8 (76.6)	20.5 (68.9)	14.5 (58.1)	10.6 (51.1)	18.7 (65.7)
Daily mean °C (°F)	6.9 (44.4)	7.3 (45.1)	9.5 (49.1)	12.7 (54.9)	17.2 (63.0)	21.2 (70.2)	24.3 (75.7)	24.5 (76.1)	20.6 (69.1)	16.8 (62.2)	11.3 (52.3)	7.7 (45.9)	15.0 (59.0)
Mean daily minimum °C (°F)	3.9 (39.0)	4.0 (39.2)	5.9 (42.6)	8.8 (47.8)	13.1 (55.6)	16.8 (62.2)	19.8 (67.6)	20.1 (68.2)	16.5 (61.7)	13.2 (55.8)	8.1 (46.6)	4.8 (40.6)	11.3 (52.2)
Record low °C (°F)	−4.3 (24.3)	−5.3 (22.5)	−4.0 (24.8)	0.9 (33.6)	4.5 (40.1)	9.7 (49.5)	11.4 (52.5)	12.2 (54.0)	7.5 (45.5)	4.5 (40.1)	−0.3 (31.5)	−3.5 (25.7)	−5.3 (22.5)
Average precipitation mm (inches)	53.8 (2.12)	45.0 (1.77)	54.7 (2.15)	53.3 (2.10)	38.8 (1.53)	43.8 (1.72)	35.2 (1.39)	43.4 (1.71)	59.4 (2.34)	74.1 (2.92)	68.6 (2.70)	69.4 (2.73)	639.5 (25.18)
Average precipitation days	6.2	6.3	6.7	6.5	5.6	5.4	4.1	4.3	5.7	6.6	7.8	8.2	73.4
Source: Regione Abruzzo
