= 2010–11 Inter Milan season =

Internazionale
2010–11 season
- President: Massimo Moratti
- Head coach: Rafael Benítez (until 23 December 2010); Leonardo (from 24 December 2010)
- Stadium: San Siro
- Serie A: 2nd
- Coppa Italia: Winners
- Supercoppa Italiana: Winners
- UEFA Champions League: Quarter-finals
- UEFA Super Cup: Runners-up
- FIFA Club World Cup: Winners
- Top goalscorer: League: Samuel Eto'o (21); All: Samuel Eto'o (37)
- Highest home attendance: 80,018 vs Milan (14 November 2010)
- Lowest home attendance: 49,787 vs Parma (28 November 2010)
- Average home league attendance: 59,697
Home colours	Away colours

The 2010–11 season was Football Club Internazionale Milano's 102nd in existence and 95th consecutive season in the top flight of Italian football.

The team took part in the Serie A, UEFA Champions League and the Coppa Italia, as titles holders of all these competitions. Internazionale won the Supercoppa Italiana against Roma, the Club World Cup against TP Mazembe and the Coppa Italia against Palermo, but lost the UEFA Super Cup to Atlético Madrid.

== Season overview ==
Departure of Mourinho and arrival of Benítez

Less than a week after winning the Champions League, on 28 May, Inter manager José Mourinho left the club and joined Real Madrid. On the 10 June, Inter signed Rafael Benítez from Liverpool on a two-year contract, ending a six-year stint as manager of the English side.

Summer transfer window

During the summer transfer window, Inter signed Luca Castellazzi from Sampdoria, and also bought the entire rights to Jonathan Biabiany from Parma. After spending his last two seasons with Vasco da Gama in Brazil, Philippe Coutinho returned to Inter. Inter sold Ricardo Quaresma to Beşiktaş and Mario Balotelli to Manchester City, as well as also sold half of the rights to Rene Krhin to Bologna, Andrea Mei to Piacenza, and sent on one-year loan Vid Belec to Crotone, Victor Obinna to West Ham United and Andrea Ranocchia to Genoa after brought the half of his contract.

World Cup

Meanwhile, during 2010 World Cup in South Africa ten players from Inter were included in their national teams, these players were Walter Samuel and Diego Milito with Argentina; Rene Krhin with Slovenia; Dejan Stanković as a captain of Serbia; Sulley Muntari with Ghana; Wesley Sneijder with the Netherlands; Samuel Eto'o as a captain of Cameroon; and Júlio César, Maicon, and Lúcio as a captain with Brazil. The Netherlands, including Wesley Sneijder, reached and lost the final match of the tournament against Spain after extra time.

Completing the Treble

Inter started their season with a win over Roma in Supercoppa Italiana, to secure their first trophy of the season. Six days later Inter lost to Atlético Madrid in UEFA Super Cup, this defeat meant Inter lost their chance to collect six trophies in the same year, as Barcelona had done the year before. In December, Inter claimed the FIFA Club World Cup for the first time after a 3–0 win against TP Mazembe in the final.

pacho Departure of Benítez and arrival of Leonardo

After this win, however, on 23 December, due to his poor performance in Serie A and separated by 13 points from the leader Milan, Inter announced on its website the departure of Rafael Benítez to be replaced by Leonardo the following day.

acho impact in January

Leonardo had huge impact on the team even with the absence of Samuel Eto'o due to suspension, and Wesley Sneijder and Júlio César due to injury. Inter won their match against Napoli with two goals from Thiago Motta and another one form Esteban Cambiasso. Inter continued their good start with Leonardo with five wins in row in all competitions, until they lost against Udinese, but Inter got in their feet quickly by qualifying to the semifinal of Coppa Italia and winning against Palermo after great comeback from 0–2 to win with 3–2 and two goals from new signing Giampaolo Pazzini.

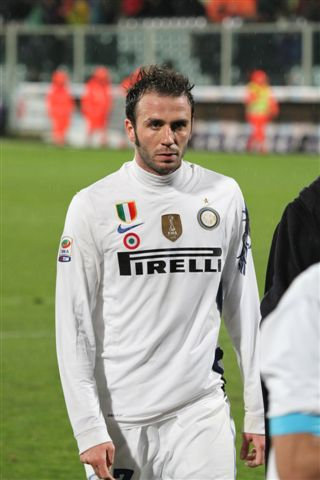
Winter signing Giampaolo Pazzini scored a brace on his debut, a 3–2 home win over Palermo

Winter transfer window

Meanwhile, the winter transfer window for Inter was busy with transfers. Due to the long-term injury of Walter Samuel, Inter bought the remainder of Andrea Ranocchia's contract from Genoa to become Leonardo's first signing. On 13 January, Mancini left the club to join Atlético Mineiro. On 28 January, Inter announced the signing of Giampaolo Pazzini from Sampdoria, as part of the deal that saw Jonathan Biabiany join Sampdoria. The next day, Houssine Kharja joined Inter on a loan deal from Genoa with option to sign permanently, while Sulley Muntari joined Sunderland on loan. On the last day of winter transfer window, Inter sent Nelson Rivas to Dnipro Dnipropetrovsk on loan, and brought Yuto Nagatomo from Cesena as part of the deal that sent Davide Santon in the opposite direction, also on loan. Both Joel Obi and Nwankwo Obiora signed co-ownership by Parma, however Obi will remain with Inter and Nwankwo will spend the rest of the season with Parma. Inter also signed Marco Andreolli from Chievo in co-ownership, and will remain at Chievo the rest of the season.

Coppa Italia title

On 6 March, Leonardo set a new Italian Serie A record by collecting 33 points in 13 games; the previous record was 32 points in 13 games made by Fabio Capello in 2004–05. On 15 March, Inter had a memorable 3–2 Champions League away victory over Bayern Munich at the Allianz Arena in the round of 16 after losing the first leg at home, but lost in the quarter-finals against Schalke 04. After Inter lost against Milan, and two weeks later Parma, Inter's Serie A season title ambitions had effectively ended. The only trophy the club won with Leonardo as a manager was the Coppa Italia.

=== Key dates ===
2010

- 28 May: Inter and Real Madrid presidents Massimo Moratti and Florentino Pérez reached agreement over manager José Mourinho, which saw the Portuguese coach moving to Real Madrid in a four-year deal.
- 10 June: Rafael Benítez signed a two-year contract that will run until 30 June 2012.
- 13 June: Inter and Beşiktaş agreed a transfer fee in the region of €7.3 million for Ricardo Quaresma.
- 15 June: Inter presented new coach Rafael Benítez at the Angelo Moratti Sports Centre.
- 17 June: Luca Castellazzi, formerly of Sampdoria, joined Inter, signing a two-year contract until 2012 with the option of a one-year extension.
- 25 June: McDonald Mariga and Jonathan Biabiany joined Inter permanently from Parma.
- 29 June: Paolo Orlandoni signed a one-year deal, which extended his contract with Inter until 30 June 2011.
- 6 July: Vid Belec joined Crotone on loan until 30 June 2011.
- 7 July: Francesco Toldo announced his retirement from football.
- 21 July: Andrea Ranocchia joined Inter, the former defender of Genoa, signed a five-year co-ownership contract until 2015. Ranocchia, however, will remain at Genoa for the 2010–11 season.
- 27 July: Inter and Bologna agreed a co-ownership deal for Rene Krhin, allowing him to play for the club during the 2010–11 season.
- 31 July: Luca Castellazzi and Philippe Coutinho made their debut for Inter against Manchester City.
- 3 August: Philippe Coutinho scored his first goal for Inter against Panathinaikos.
- 9 August: Javier Zanetti signed a two-year extended his deal, which extended his contract with Inter until 30 June 2013.
- 9 August: Diego Milito signed a one-year extended his deal, which extended his contract with Inter until 30 June 2014.
- 13 August: Inter and Manchester City agreed a transfer fee in the region of €30 million for Mario Balotelli.
- 21 August: Inter won the Supercoppa Italiana for the fifth time, defeating Roma in the final 3–1.
- 27 August: Inter sent Victor Obinna to West Ham United on one-year loan.
- 27 August: Inter lost 2–0 to Atlético Madrid in UEFA Super Cup.
- 28 October: Wesley Sneijder signed a two-year extended his deal, which extended his contract with Inter until 30 June 2015.
- 14 November: The 46 home matches unbeaten streak in Serie A was ended by losing the Derby della Madonnina.
- 18 December: Inter won the FIFA Club World Cup for the first time, defeating TP Mazembe in the final 3–0.
- 23 December: Inter and Rafael Benítez reached agreement over separating by mutual agreement.
- 24 December: Leonardo appointed as Inter new coach, and signed a contract that will run until 30 June 2012.
- 29 December: Inter and Massimo Moratti officially presented their new coach Leonardo at the Angelo Moratti Sports Centre.

2011

- 3 January: Andrea Ranocchia signed a deal until June 2015.
- 12 January: Mancini joined Atlético Mineiro permanently from Inter.
- 19 January: Javier Zanetti overtook Inter's legend Giuseppe Bergomi in Serie A appearances.
- 28 January: Giampaolo Pazzini signed a deal until June 2015, as part of the deal Jonathan Biabiany joined Sampdoria.
- 29 January: Houssine Kharja joined Inter on a loan deal with option to sign permanently in June 2011.
- 29 January: Sulley Muntari joined Sunderland on a loan deal until the end of the season.
- 31 January: Nelson Rivas joined Dnipro Dnipropetrovsk on a loan deal until the end of the season, with option to sign permanently.
- 31 January: Yuto Nagatomo joined Inter on loan as part of the deal Davide Santon moved to Cesena on loan also until the end of the season.
- 31 January: Joel Obi and Nwankwo Obiora signed co-ownership by Parma, however Obi will remain with Inter and Nwankwo will spend the remainder of the season with Parma.
- 31 January: Inter signed Marco Andreolli from Chievo in a co-ownership deal; however, he will remain at Chievo for the remainder of the season.
- 15 March: Inter had a memorable 3–2 Champions League away victory over Bayern Munich at the Allianz Arena in the round of 16 after losing the first leg at home.
- 2 April: Inter lost 3–0 to Milan in the Derby della Madonnina.
- 13 April: Inter were knocked out of the Champions League by Schalke 04 in the quarter-finals after 2–1 defeat in the second leg at the Veltins-Arena.
- 22 May: Inter finished the Serie A season in second place with 76 points, behind champions Milan.
- 29 May: Inter won the Coppa Italia for the seventh time, defeating Palermo in the final 3–1.

== Players ==
=== Squad information ===
As of 22 May 2011

Squad no.	Name	Nationality	Position	Date of birth (age)
Goalkeepers
1	Júlio César	(Brazil)	GK	3 September 1979 (aged 31)
12	Luca Castellazzi	(Italy)	GK	19 July 1975 (aged 35)
21	Paolo Orlandoni	(Italy)	GK	12 August 1972 (aged 38)
Defenders
2	Iván Córdoba (vice-Captain)	(Colombia)	CB	11 August 1976 (aged 34)
4	Javier Zanetti (Captain)	(Argentina)	RB / CM / RM	10 August 1973 (aged 37)
6	Lúcio	(Brazil)	CB	8 May 1978 (aged 33)
13	Maicon	(Brazil)	RB	26 July 1981 (aged 29)
15	Andrea Ranocchia	(Italy)	CB	16 February 1988 (aged 23)
23	Marco Materazzi	(Italy)	CB	19 August 1973 (aged 37)
25	Walter Samuel	(Argentina)	CB	23 March 1978 (aged 33)
26	Cristian Chivu	(Romania)	LB / CB / DM	26 October 1980 (aged 30)
55	Yuto Nagatomo	(Japan)	LB / RB / LM	12 September 1986 (aged 24)
Midfielders
5	Dejan Stanković	(Serbia)	CM / AM	11 September 1978 (aged 32)
8	Thiago Motta	(Italy)	DM / CM	17 June 1984 (aged 27)
10	Wesley Sneijder	(Netherlands)	AM / CM / LW	9 June 1984 (aged 27)
14	Houssine Kharja	(Morocco)	CM / DM / AM	9 November 1982 (aged 28)
17	McDonald Mariga	(Kenya)	DM / CM	4 April 1987 (aged 24)
19	Esteban Cambiasso	(Argentina)	DM / CM	18 August 1980 (aged 30)
29	Philippe Coutinho	(Brazil)	AM / LW / RW	12 June 1992 (aged 19)
40	Nwankwo Obiora	(Nigeria)	DM / CM	12 July 1991 (aged 19)
Forwards
7	Giampaolo Pazzini	(Italy)	CF	2 August 1984 (aged 26)
9	Samuel Eto'o	(Cameroon)	CF	10 March 1981 (aged 30)
18	David Suazo	(Honduras)	CF	5 November 1979 (aged 31)
22	Diego Milito	(Argentina)	CF	12 June 1979 (aged 32)
27	Goran Pandev	(North Macedonia)	SS / RW / CF	25 March 1983 (aged 28)

==== From youth squad ====
Note: Flags indicate national team as defined under FIFA eligibility rules; some limited exceptions apply. Players may hold more than one non-FIFA nationality.

No.	Pos.	Nation	Player
20	MF	NGR	Joel Obi
31	FW	ROU	Denis Alibec
34	DF	ITA	Cristiano Biraghi
35	MF	ITA	Andrea Romanò
36	DF	ITA	Simone Benedetti
41	GK	ITA	Raffaele Di Gennaro

No.	Pos.	Nation	Player
48	MF	ITA	Lorenzo Crisetig
54	FW	ITA	Simone Dell'Agnello
57	DF	ITA	Felice Natalino
61	MF	ITA	Daniel Bessa
62	DF	CZE	Marek Kysela
92	GK	ITA	Alberto Gallinetta

== Transfers ==
=== In ===
No.	Pos.	Name	Age	Moving From	Type of Transfer	Ends	Transfer window	Transfer fee	Source
12	GK	(Italy) Luca Castellazzi	34	(Italy) Sampdoria	Full ownership	2012	Summer	Free	inter.it
17	MF	(Kenya) McDonald Mariga	23	(Italy) Parma	Co-ownership Termination	2014	Summer	reported €10,000,000	fcparma.com
88	FW	(France) Jonathan Biabiany	22	(Italy) Parma	Co-ownership Termination	N/A	Summer	reported €10,000,000	fcparma.com
16	DF	(Argentina) Nicolás Burdisso	29	(Italy) Roma	Loan return	2011	Summer	Free	
24	DF	(Colombia) Nelson Rivas	27	(Italy) Livorno	Loan return	2011	Summer	Free	
30	MF	(Brazil) Mancini	29	(Italy) Milan	Loan return	2012	Summer	Free	
29	MF	(Brazil) Philippe Coutinho	18	(Brazil) Vasco da Gama	Loan return	N/A	Summer	Free	
18	FW	(Honduras) David Suazo	30	(Italy) Genoa	Loan return	2011	Summer	Free	
N/A	FW	(Brazil) Kerlon	22	(Netherlands) Ajax	Loan return	2012	Summer	Free	
33	FW	(Nigeria) Victor Obinna	23	(Spain) Málaga	Loan return	N/A	Summer	Free	
36	DF	(Italy) Simone Benedetti	18	(Italy) Torino	Co-ownership	N/A	Summer	included in Stevanović's deal	torinofc.it
15	DF	(Italy) Andrea Ranocchia	22	(Italy) Genoa	Full ownership	2015	Winter	€12,500,000	inter.it
7	FW	(Italy) Giampaolo Pazzini	26	(Italy) Sampdoria	Full ownership	2015	Winter	€12,000,000 + Biabiany	inter.it
14	MF	(Morocco) Houssine Kharja	28	(Italy) Genoa	Loan with an option for full ownership	2011	Winter	Free	inter.it
55	DF	(Japan) Yuto Nagatomo	24	(Italy) Cesena	Loan	2011	Winter	Undisclosed	inter.it

Total spending: ▼€34.5 million

=== Out ===
No.	Pos.	Name	Age	Moving to	Type of Transfer	Transfer window	Transfer fee	Source
N/A	MG	(Portugal) José Mourinho	47	(Spain) Real Madrid	Transfer	Summer	€16,000,000	inter.it CCIAA annual report archive (require purchase)
89	FW	(Austria) Marko Arnautović	21	(Netherlands) Twente	Loan ended	Summer	Free	werder.de
7	MF	(Portugal) Ricardo Quaresma	26	(Turkey) Beşiktaş	Full ownership	Summer	€7,300,000	bjk.com.tr Turkish Stock Exchange (KAP)
N/A	MF	(Chile) Luis Jiménez	26	(Italy) Ternana	Co-ownership Termination	Summer	€3,177,000	inter.it CCIAA annual report archive (require purchase)
51	GK	(Slovenia) Vid Belec	20	(Italy) Crotone	Loan	Summer	Undisclosed	inter.it
1	GK	(Italy) Francesco Toldo	38	–	Retired	Summer	Free	inter.it
N/A	GK	(Italy) Enrico Alfonso	22	(Italy) Modena	Loan	Summer	Undisclosed	modenafc.net
N/A	DF	(Italy) Andrea Ranocchia	22	(Italy) Genoa	Loan	Summer	Undisclosed	inter.it
28	MF	(Serbia) Alen Stevanović	19	(Italy) Torino	Co-ownership	Summer	Undisclosed	torinofc.it
15	MF	(Slovenia) Rene Krhin	20	(Italy) Bologna	Co-ownership	Summer	€2,000,000	bolognafc.itbolognafc.it
45	FW	(Italy) Mario Balotelli	20	(England) Manchester City	Full ownership	Summer	reported €30,000,000	inter.it, mcfc.co.uk
33	FW	(Nigeria) Victor Obinna	23	(England) West Ham United	Loan	Summer	Undisclosed	inter.it, whufc
16	DF	(Argentina) Nicolás Burdisso	29	(Italy) Roma	Full ownership	Summer	€8,000,000	inter.it asroma.it
N/A	DF	(Brazil) Rincón	23	(Italy) Chievo	Co-ownership	Summer	Undisclosed	inter.it
30	MF	(Brazil) Mancini	30	(Brazil) Atlético Mineiro	Full ownership	Winter	Undisclosed	inter.it atletico.com.br
88	FW	(France) Jonathan Biabiany	22	(Italy) Sampdoria	Full ownership	Winter	Part of Giampaolo Pazzini deal	inter.it
11	MF	(Ghana) Sulley Muntari	26	(England) Sunderland	Loan with option to buy	Winter	Undisclosed	inter.it safc.com
24	DF	(Colombia) Nelson Rivas	27	(Ukraine) Dnipro Dnipropetrovsk	Loan with option to buy	Winter	Undisclosed	inter.it
39	DF	(Italy) Davide Santon	20	(Italy) Cesena	Loan	Winter	Undisclosed	inter.it
40	MF	(Nigeria) Nwankwo Obiora	19	(Italy) Parma	Co-ownership	Winter	Undisclosed	inter.it

Total income: €67,100,000 ▲

Net Income: €26,600,000 ▲

=== Out on loan, co-ownership deals ===
- Updated 29 January 2011

Nat.	No.	Name	Age	Since	T. Apps.	L. Apps.	C. Apps.	E. Apps.	W. Apps.	T. Goals	L. Goals	C. Goals	E. Goals	W. Goals	Ends	Transfer fee	Notes
Confirmed loans transfers 2010–11
Goalkeepers
(Italy)	71	Enrico Alfonso	22	2007	1	0	1	0	0	0	0	0	0	0	2012	Undisclosed	On loan to Modena; Co-ownership with Chievo
Defenders
(Italy)	N/A	Marco Andreolli	24	2005; 2011 (W)	13	7	4	2	0	1	0	1	0	0	N/A	Undisclosed	Co-ownership with Chievo; On loan to Chievo
(Italy)	N/A	Giulio Donati	20	2008	1	0	1	0	0	0	0	0	0	0	N/A	Youth Team	On loan to Lecce
(Nigeria)	40	Nwankwo Obiorah	19	2010	5	2	0	3	0	0	0	0	0	0	N/A	Youth Team	Co-ownership with Parma; On loan to Parma
(Colombia)	24	Nelson Rivas	27	2007	28	16	8	4	0	0	0	0	0	0	2011	€2,000,000	On loan to Dnipro Dnipropetrovsk
(Italy)	39	Davide Santon	19	2008	52	40	5	7	1	0	0	0	0	0	2013	Youth Team	On loan to Cesena
Midfielders
(Slovenia)	15	Rene Krhin	20	2007 (W)	5	5	0	0	0	0	0	0	0	0	2014	Youth Team	Co-ownership with Bologna
(Ghana)	11	Sulley Muntari	25	2008	93	62	10	19	1	7	6	1	0	0	2012	€14,000,000	On loan to Sunderland
Forwards
(Italy)	N/A	Aiman Napoli	21	2007	1	0	1	0	0	0	0	0	0	0	N/A	Undisclosed	On loan to Crotone
(Nigeria)	33	Victor Obinna	23	2008	11	9	2	0	0	1	1	0	0	0	N/A	Free	On loan to West Ham United
(Italy)	N/A	Luca Siligardi	22	2006	2	0	2	0	0	0	0	0	0	0	2012	Youth Team	On loan to Bologna
(Serbia)	28	Alen Stevanović	19	2009 (W)	1	1	0	0	0	0	0	0	0	0	N/A	Undisclosed	Co-ownership with Torino

- L=Serie A
- C=Coppa Italia, Super Cup
- E=Europe
- W=World

== Club ==
Coaching staff

Position	Staff
Coach	(Brazil) Leonardo
Vice coach	(Italy) Giuseppe Baresi
Coach assistant	(Italy) Daniele Bernazzani
Goalkeeper coach	(Italy) Alessandro Nista
Fitness coach	(Italy) Stefano Rapetti

Last updated: 30 December 2010
Source: F.C. Internazionale Milano Official Website

Medical staff

Position	Staff
Chief of medical staff	(Italy) Franco Combi
Doctor	(Italy) Giorgio Panico

Last updated: 30 December 2010
Source: F.C. Internazionale Milano Official Website

Rehabilitation staff

Position	Staff
Masseurs; Physiotherapists	(Italy) Marco Dellacasa
Masseurs; Physiotherapists	(Italy) Massimo Dellacasa
Masseurs; Physiotherapists	(Italy) Luigi Sessolo
Masseurs; Physiotherapists	(Italy) Andrea Galli
Masseurs; Physiotherapists	(Italy) Alberto Galbiati

Last updated: 30 December 2010
Source: F.C. Internazionale Milano Official Website

== Pre-season and friendlies ==
=== TIM Trophy ===
13 August 2010 TIM Trophy	Internazionale	1–0	Juventus	Bari
20:45 CEST	Sneijder 26'	Report		Stadium: Stadio San Nicola; Referee: Domenico Celi8

13 August 2010 TIM Trophy	Milan	0–0 (2–3 p)	Internazionale	Bari, Italy
22:45 CEST	Flamini (yellow card) 18'	Report		Stadium: Stadio San Nicola; Referee: Domenico Celi
	Penalties
	Flamini (penalty missed); Inzaghi (penalty missed); Oddo (penalty scored); Huntelaar (penalty scored); Ronaldinho (penalty missed)		(penalty scored) Milito; (penalty missed) Mancini; (penalty scored) Coutinho; (penalty scored) Obi; (penalty missed) Stanković

=== Other friendlies ===
31 July 2010 Pirelli Cup	Internazionale	3–0	Manchester City	Baltimore, United States
20:00 EDT	Pandev (yellow card) 19'; Chivu (yellow card) 33'; Obinna 38', 54'; Biraghi 74'	Report	Kompany (yellow card) 19'; Vieira (red card) 22'; Zabaleta (yellow card) 60'	Stadium: M&T Bank Stadium; Attendance: 36,569; Referee: Baldomero Toledo (United States)

3 August 2010 Canada Tour	Internazionale	2–3	Panathinaikos	Toronto, Canada
20:00 EDT	Córdoba (yellow card) 29'; Eto'o 32'; Stanković (yellow card) 82'; Coutinho 88'; Muntari (yellow card) 90+1'	Report	Cissé 12', 22'; Leto 42'; Sarriegi (yellow card) 60'; Karagounis (yellow card) 76'	Stadium: Rogers Centre; Referee: Mauricio Navarro (Canada)

5 August 2010 USA Tour	FC Dallas	2–2	Internazionale	Frisco, United States
20:00 CDT	Ihemelu (yellow card) 38'; John 41'; Ferreira 75' (pen.)	Report	Milito 24'; Eto'o 63'; Burdisso (yellow card) 74'; (yellow card) Santon	Stadium: Pizza Hut Park; Attendance: 19,000; Referee: Jeff Gontarek (United States)

== Competitions ==
=== Overview ===
Competition	First match	Last match	Starting round	Final position	Record							
Competition	First match	Last match	Starting round	Final position	Pld	W	D	L	GF	GA	GD	Win %
Serie A	30 August 2010	22 May 2010	Matchday 1	Runners-up	38	23	7	8	68	41	+27	60.53
Coppa Italia	12 January 2011	29 May 2011	Round of 32	Winners	5	4	1	0	8	4	+4	80.00
Supercoppa Italiana	21 August 2010		Final	Winners	1	1	0	0	3	1	+2	100.00
Champions League	13 September 2010	13 April 2011	Group stage	Quarter-finals	10	4	1	5	18	21	−3	40.00
UEFA Super Cup	27 August 2010		Final	Runners-up	1	0	0	1	0	2	−2	0.00
FIFA Club World Cup	15 December 2010	18 December 2010	Semi-finals	Winners	2	2	0	0	6	0	+6	100.00
Total					57	34	9	14	103	69	+34	59.65

Last updated: 29 May 2011
Source: Soccerway

=== Serie A ===
==== League table ====
Pos	Team	Pld	W	D	L	GF	GA	GD	Pts	Qualification or relegation
1	Milan (C)	38	24	10	4	65	24	+41	82	Qualification to Champions League group stage
2	Internazionale	38	23	7	8	69	42	+27	76	Qualification to Champions League group stage
3	Napoli	38	21	7	10	59	39	+20	70	Qualification to Champions League group stage
4	Udinese	38	20	6	12	65	43	+22	66 (Note: Udinese finished ahead of Lazio on head-to-head away goals scored: Udinese 2–1 Lazio, Lazio 3–2 Udinese.)	Qualification to Champions League play-off round
5	Lazio	38	20	6	12	55	39	+16	66	Qualification to Europa League play-off round (Note: As Internazionale won the 2010–11 Coppa Italia and already qualified for the Champions League, Palermo entered the 2011–12 UEFA Europa League third qualification round as the cup runners-up.)

Source: Lega Serie A
Rules for classification: 1) points; 2) head-to-head points; 3) head-to-head goal difference; 4) head-to-head goals scored; 5) goal difference; 6) number of goals scored.
(C) Champions

==== Results summary ====
Overall								Home						Away					
Pld	W	D	L	GF	GA	GD	Pts	W	D	L	GF	GA	GD	W	D	L	GF	GA	GD
38	23	7	8	69	42	+27	76	15	3	1	48	20	+28	8	4	7	21	22	−1

Last updated: 22 May 2011.
Source: Internazionale Milano

==== Results by round ====
Round	1	2	3	4	5	6	7	8	9	10	11	12	13	14	15	16	17	18	19	20	21	22	23	24	25	26	27	28	29	30	31	32	33	34	35	36	37	38
Ground	A	H	A	H	A	H	A	H	A	H	A	H	A	H	A	H	A	H	A	H	A	H	A	H	A	H	A	H	A	H	A	H	A	H	A	H	A	H
Result	D	W	W	W	L	D	W	D	W	D	D	L	L	W	L	W	W	W	W	L	W	W	W	L	W	W	W	W	D	W	L	W	L	W	W	W	D	W
Position	9	6	2	1	1	2	3	3	2	3	4	5	6	5	5	7	7	6	4	5	4	3	3	4	4	3	2	2	2	2	3	3	3	2	2	2	2	2

Updated to match(es) played on 3 April 2011. Source: Competitive Matches
A = Away; H = Home; W = Win; D = Draw; L = Loss

==== Matches ====
30 August 2010 1	Bologna	0–0	Internazionale	Bologna
20:45 CEST	Esposito (yellow card) 37'; Mudingayi (yellow card) 60'; Britos (yellow card) 88'	Report	Sneijder (yellow card) 28'; Mariga (yellow card) 75'	Stadium: Stadio Renato Dall'Ara; Attendance: 28,439; Referee: Paolo Valeri

11 September 2010 2	Internazionale	2–1	Udinese	Milan
18:00 CEST	Lúcio 7'; Zanetti (yellow card) 10'; Eto'o (yellow card) 51', (goal) 67'	Report	Floro Flores 31'; Pinzi (yellow card) 34'; Di Natale (yellow card) 69'; Cuadrado (yellow card) 89'	Stadium: San Siro; Attendance: 62,014; Referee: Christian Brighi

19 September 2010 3	Palermo	1–2	Internazionale	Palermo
15:00 CEST	Iličić 28'; Bovo (yellow card) 68'; Cassani (yellow card) 71'	Report	Eto'o 62', 70'	Stadium: Stadio Renzo Barbera; Attendance: 27,291; Referee: Andrea Romeo

22 September 2010 4	Internazionale	4–0	Bari	Milan
20:45 CEST	Stanković (yellow card) 18'; Milito 27', 86'; Eto'o 50' (pen.), 63' (pen.)	Report	Pulzetti (yellow card) 44'	Stadium: San Siro; Attendance: 61,093; Referee: Paolo Silvio Mazzoleni

25 September 2010 5	Roma	1–0	Internazionale	Rome
20:45 CEST	Cassetti (yellow card) 63'; Perrotta (yellow card) 65'; N. Burdisso (yellow card) 70'; Ménez (yellow card) 78'; Vučinić 90+2'	Report	Chivu (yellow card) 37'; Stanković (yellow card) 52'; Córdoba (yellow card) 57'; Pandev (yellow card) 69'	Stadium: Stadio Olimpico; Attendance: 45,109; Referee: Emidio Morganti

3 October 2010 6	Internazionale	0–0	Juventus	Milan
20:45 CEST	Chivu (yellow card) 35'	Report	Bonucci (yellow card) 16'; Motta (yellow card) 65'	Stadium: San Siro; Attendance: 78,883; Referee: Luca Banti

17 October 2010 7	Cagliari	0–1	Internazionale	Cagliari
12:30 CEST	Nenê (yellow card) 15'; Nainggolan (yellow card) 23'; Lazzari (yellow card) 61'	Report	Lúcio (yellow card) 32'; Eto'o 39'	Stadium: Stadio Sant'Elia; Attendance: 20,000; Referee: Paolo Tagliavento

24 October 2010 8	Internazionale	1–1	Sampdoria	Milan
20:45 CEST	Eto'o 80'	Report	Volta (yellow card) 45'; Guberti 62'; Costa (yellow card) 82'; Pazzini (yellow card) 83'; Poli (yellow card) 90+2'; Zauri (yellow card) 90+6'	Stadium: San Siro; Attendance: 56,415; Referee: Daniele Orsato

29 October 2010 9	Genoa	0–1	Internazionale	Genoa
20:45 CEST	Milanetto (yellow card) 60'; Boakye (yellow card) 90+4'	Report	Santon (yellow card) 31'; Muntari 45+3', (yellow card) 82'	Stadium: Stadio Luigi Ferraris; Attendance: 27,566; Referee: Luca Banti

6 November 2010 10	Internazionale	1–1	Brescia	Milan
20:45 CET	Eto'o 71' (pen.); Coutinho (yellow card) 84'	Report	Caracciolo 14'; Hetemaj (yellow card) 84'; Arcari (yellow card) 88'	Stadium: San Siro; Attendance: 58,183; Referee: Gabriele Gava

10 November 2010 11	Lecce	1–1	Internazionale	Lecce
20:45 CET	Brivio (yellow card) 51'; Rosati (yellow card) 63'; Gustavo (yellow card) 71'; Olivera 79'	Report	Milito 76', (yellow card) 80'	Stadium: Stadio Via del Mare; Attendance: 14,583; Referee: Paolo Valeri

14 November 2010 12	Internazionale	0–1	Milan	Milan
20:45 CET	Pandev (yellow card) 60'	Report	Ibrahimović 5' (pen.), (yellow card) 65'; Abate (yellow card) 11' (yellow-red card) 60'; Gattuso (yellow card) 19'; Ambrosini (yellow card) 80'	Stadium: San Siro; Attendance: 80,018; Referee: Paolo Tagliavento

21 November 2010 13	Chievo	2–1	Internazionale	Verona
15:00 CET	Théréau (yellow card) 23'; Pellissier 29'; Fernandes (yellow card) 33'; Rigoni (yellow card) 45'; Moscardelli 82'	Report	Córdoba (yellow card) 34'; Stanković (yellow card) 74'; Eto'o 90+2'	Stadium: Stadio Marc'Antonio Bentegodi; Attendance: 19,268; Referee: Gianluca Rocchi

28 November 2010 14	Internazionale	5–2	Parma	Milan
12:30 CET	Stanković 18', 19', 75'; Cambiasso 23'; Motta 72'	Report	Crespo 4', 35'	Stadium: San Siro; Attendance: 49,787; Referee: Antonio Danilo Giannoccaro

3 December 2010 15	Lazio	3–1	Internazionale	Rome
20:45 CET	Biava 26'; Zárate 52'; Brocchi (yellow card) 61'; Radu (yellow card) 83'; Hernanes 89'	Report	Muntari (yellow card) 21'; Pandev 74'	Stadium: Stadio Olimpico; Attendance: 39,710; Referee: Daniele Orsato

19 January 2011 16	Internazionale	3–2	Cesena	Milan
20:45 CET	Eto'o 14'; Milito 15'; Materazzi (yellow card) 36'; Chivu 45+1'	Report	Bogdani 23'; Giaccherini 29', (yellow card) 46' (yellow-red card) 74'; Benalouane (yellow card) 86'	Stadium: San Siro; Attendance: 52,507; Referee: Nicola Russo

16 February 2011 17	Fiorentina	1–2	Internazionale	Florence
18:30 CET	Comotto (yellow card) 20'; Pasqual 33'	Report	Camporese 6' (o.g.); Pazzini 62'; Stanković (yellow card) 86'	Stadium: Stadio Artemio Franchi; Attendance: 31,595; Referee: Antonio Damato

6 January 2011 18	Internazionale	3–1	Napoli	Milan
20:45 CET	Motta 3', 55'; Chivu (yellow card) 6'; Zanetti (yellow card) 21'; Cambiasso 37'; Maicon (yellow card) 81'	Report	Aronica (yellow card) 11'; Pazienza 25'; Campagnaro (yellow card) 68'	Stadium: San Siro; Attendance: 60,515; Referee: Gianluca Rocchi

9 January 2011 19	Catania	1–2	Internazionale	Catania
15:00 CET	Gómez 71', (yellow card) 71'; Martinho (yellow card) 89'	Report	Cambiasso 74', 79'; Córdoba (yellow card) 81'; Lúcio (yellow card) 90'	Stadium: Stadio Angelo Massimino; Attendance: 15,089; Referee: Antonio Damato

15 January 2011 20	Internazionale	4–1	Bologna	Milan
20:45 CET	Stanković 20'; Milito 30'; Eto'o 63', 72'	Report	Giménez 77'	Stadium: San Siro; Attendance: 52,724; Referee: Gabriele Gava

23 January 2011 21	Udinese	3–1	Internazionale	Udine
12:30 CET	Zapata 21'; Di Natale 25'; Domizzi 69'	Report	Stanković 16', (yellow card) 90+4'; Motta (yellow card) 57'; Córdoba (yellow card) 64'; Chivu (yellow card) 72'	Stadium: Stadio Friuli; Attendance: 26,036; Referee: Emidio Morganti

30 January 2011 22	Internazionale	3–2	Palermo	Milan
15:00 CET	Pazzini 57', 73'; Motta (yellow card) 63'; Eto'o 76' (pen.), (yellow card) 76'; Kharja (yellow card) 90'	Report	Miccoli 5'; Bačinovič (yellow card) 32'; Nocerino 36'; Sirigu (yellow card) 55'; Pastore (penalty missed) 63'; Muñoz (yellow card) 76'	Stadium: San Siro; Attendance: 51,829; Referee: Nicola Rizzoli

3 February 2011 23	Bari	0–3	Internazionale	Bari
20:45 CET	Bentivoglio (yellow card) 23'; Glik (yellow card) 43'	Report	Ranocchia (yellow card) 9'; Motta (yellow card) 48'; Kharja 70'; Materazzi (yellow card) 75'; Eto'o (yellow card) 88'; Pazzini 90+4'; Sneijder 90+6'	Stadium: Stadio San Nicola; Attendance: 37,450; Referee: Andrea Romeo

6 February 2011 24	Internazionale	5–3	Roma	Milan
20:45 CET	Sneijder 3'; Eto'o 35', 63' (pen.); Kharja (yellow card) 38'; Motta 71'; Cambiasso 90'	Report	Simplício 13'; Borriello (yellow card) 43'; Burdisso (red card) 62'; Vučinić 75'; Loria 81'; De Rossi (yellow card) 88'	Stadium: San Siro; Attendance: 62,344; Referee: Paolo Tagliavento

13 February 2011 25	Juventus	1–0	Internazionale	Turin
20:45 CET	Matri 30'; Sissoko (yellow card) 79'	Report	Maicon (yellow card) 87'; Motta (yellow card) 90+3'	Stadium: Stadio Olimpico di Torino; Attendance: 24,485; Referee: Paolo Valeri

19 February 2011 26	Internazionale	1–0	Cagliari	Milan
20:45 CET	Ranocchia 7'; Mariga (yellow card) 90+1'; Maicon (yellow card) 90+4'	Report	Cossu (yellow card) 7'	Stadium: San Siro; Attendance: 57,891; Referee: Domenico Celi

27 February 2011 27	Sampdoria	0–2	Internazionale	Genoa
20:45 CET	Gastaldello (yellow card) 72'; Volta (yellow card) 79'; Poli (yellow card) 81'	Report	Lúcio (yellow card) 70'; Sneijder 73'; Chivu (yellow card) 90'; Eto'o 90+4'	Stadium: Stadio Luigi Ferraris; Attendance: 24,417; Referee: Andrea Gervasoni

6 March 2011 28	Internazionale	5–2	Genoa	Milan
15:00 CET	Pazzini 50'; Eto'o 51', 57'; Pandev 71'; Nagatomo 84'	Report	Palacio 40'; Kaladze (yellow card) 47'; Boselli 90'	Stadium: San Siro; Attendance: 56,322; Referee: Carmine Russo

11 March 2011 29	Brescia	1–1	Internazionale	Brescia
20:45 CET	Daprelà (yellow card) 27'; Zebina (yellow card) 39'; Caracciolo (yellow card) 43' (yellow-red card) 90+5', (goal) 84', (penalty missed) 90'; Kone (yellow card) 55'; Hetemaj (yellow card) 88'	Report	Eto'o 18'; Maicon (yellow card) 52'; Córdoba (red card) 89'	Stadium: Stadio Mario Rigamonti; Attendance: 30,000; Referee: Gianluca Rocchi

20 March 2011 30	Internazionale	1–0	Lecce	Milan
15:00 CET	Lúcio (yellow card) 47'; Pazzini 52'; Motta (yellow card) 69'; Chivu (yellow card) 80'	Report	Giacomazzi (yellow card) 41'; Rosati (yellow card) 52'; Tomović (yellow card) 76'	Stadium: San Siro; Attendance: 62,477; Referee: Daniele Orsato

2 April 2011 31	Milan	3–0	Internazionale	Milan
20:45 CEST	Pato 1', 62'; Robinho (yellow card) 26'; Van Bommel (yellow card) 53'; Zambrotta (yellow card) 65'; Cassano 90' (pen.), (yellow card) 90' (yellow-red card) 90+2'	Report	Maicon (yellow card) 41'; Chivu (red card) 54'; Zanetti (yellow card) 88'	Stadium: San Siro; Attendance: 80,018; Referee: Nicola Rizzoli

9 April 2011 32	Internazionale	2–0	Chievo	Milan
18:00 CEST	Cambiasso 65'; Kharja (yellow card) 81'; Maicon 84'	Report	Sardo (yellow card) 20'	Stadium: San Siro; Attendance: 61,456; Referee: Antonio Danilo Giannoccaro

16 April 2011 33	Parma	2–0	Internazionale	Parma
20:45 CEST	Giovinco 34'; Amauri 86'	Report	Ranocchia (yellow card) 19'; Stanković (yellow card) 72'	Stadium: Stadio Ennio Tardini; Attendance: 15,000; Referee: Gianluca Rocchi

23 April 2011 34	Internazionale	2–1	Lazio	Milan
15:00 CEST	Júlio César (red card) 22'; Sneijder 40'; Eto'o 53'; Mariga (yellow card) 62'	Report	Zárate 24' (pen.), (yellow card) 50'; Garrido (yellow card) 38'; Ledesma (yellow card) 42'; Mauri (red card) 66'	Stadium: San Siro; Attendance: 57,830; Referee: Emidio Morganti

30 April 2011 35	Cesena	1–2	Internazionale	Cesena
18:00 CEST	Budan (yellow card) 14', (goal) 56'; Ceccarelli (yellow card) 58'; Caserta (yellow card) 84'	Report	Lúcio (yellow card) 87'; Mariga (yellow card) 70'; Pazzini 90+1', 90+4'	Stadium: Stadio Dino Manuzzi; Attendance: 23,000; Referee: Paolo Valeri

8 May 2011 36	Internazionale	3–1	Fiorentina	Milan
15:00 CEST	Pazzini 25'; Cambiasso 28'; Coutinho 77'	Report	De Silvestri (yellow card) 28'; Gilardino 74'	Stadium: San Siro; Attendance: 55,879; Referee: Luca Banti

15 May 2011 37	Napoli	1–1	Internazionale	Naples
20:45 CEST	Zúñiga 45+1', (yellow card) 45+2'	Report	Eto'o 15'	Stadium: Stadio San Paolo; Attendance: 46,000; Referee: Andrea De Marco

22 May 2011 38	Internazionale	3–1	Catania	Milan
18:00 CEST	Pazzini 15', 48'; Nagatomo 63'	Report	Ledesma 66'	Stadium: San Siro; Attendance: 56,072; Referee: Nicola Pierpaoli

=== Coppa Italia ===
12 January 2011 Round of 16	Internazionale	3–2	Genoa	Milan
21:00 CEST	Eto'o 15', 43'; Ranocchia (yellow card) 54'; Muntari (yellow card) 57'; Mariga 59'	Report	Kharja 54' (pen.); Sculli 90+1'	Stadium: San Siro; Attendance: 15,254; Referee: Nicola Pierpaoli

26 January 2011 Quarter-finals	Napoli	0–0 (a.e.t.) (4–5 p)	Internazionale	Naples
20:45 CEST	Cannavaro (yellow card) 26'; Cavani (yellow card) 97'	Report	Motta (yellow card) 41'; Lúcio (yellow card) 111'	Stadium: Stadio San Paolo; Attendance: 40,580; Referee: Paolo Valeri
	Penalties
	Cavani (penalty scored); Hamšík (penalty scored); Lavezzi (penalty missed); Zúñiga (penalty scored); Yebda (penalty scored)		(penalty scored) Eto'o; (penalty scored) Cambiasso; (penalty scored) Pandev; (penalty scored) Motta; (penalty scored) Chivu

19 April 2011 Semi-finals First leg	Roma	0–1	Internazionale	Rome
20:45 CEST	Taddei (yellow card) 5'; N. Burdisso (yellow card) 51'	Report	Maicon (yellow card) 14'; Stanković 45'; Ranocchia (yellow card) 57'; Sneijder (yellow card) 59'	Stadium: Stadio Olimpico; Attendance: 42,582; Referee: Nicola Rizzoli

11 May 2011 Semi-finals Second leg	Internazionale	1–1 (2–1 agg.)	Roma	Milan
20:45 CEST	Eto'o 58'; Chivu (yellow card) 67'; Maicon (yellow card) 87'	Report	Borriello 84'; Perrotta (yellow card) 89'; Burdisso (yellow card) 90'	Stadium: San Siro; Attendance: 33,094; Referee: Daniele Orsato

29 May 2011 Final	Internazionale	3–1	Palermo	Rome
21:00 CEST	Eto'o 26', 76'; Milito 90'	Report	Acquah (yellow card) 26'; Muñoz (yellow card) 52' (yellow-red card) 90', (goal) 88'; Carrozzieri (yellow card) 68'	Stadium: Stadio Olimpico; Attendance: 70,000; Referee: Emidio Morganti

=== Supercoppa Italiana ===
21 August 2010 Final	Internazionale	3–1	Roma	Milan
20:45 CEST	Pandev 42'; Cambiasso (yellow card) 62'; Eto'o 70', 80'; Samuel (yellow card) 90+4'	report	Riise 21'; Perrotta (yellow card) 26'; Okaka (yellow card) 85'; Mexès (yellow card) 90+3'	Stadium: San Siro; Attendance: 65,860; Referee: Mauro Bergonzi

=== UEFA Champions League ===
==== Group stage ====
Pos	Team	Pld	W	D	L	GF	GA	GD	Pts	Qualification
1	(England) Tottenham Hotspur	6	3	2	1	18	11	+7	11	Advance to knockout phase
2	(Italy) Internazionale	6	3	1	2	12	11	+1	10	Advance to knockout phase
3	(Netherlands) Twente	6	1	3	2	9	11	−2	6	Transfer to Europa League
4	(Germany) Werder Bremen	6	1	2	3	6	12	−6	5	

Source: Soccerway

14 September 2010 1	Twente (Netherlands)	2–2	(Italy) Internazionale	Enschede, Netherlands
20:45 CEST (UTC+2)	Janssen 20'; Milito 30' (o.g.); Douglas (yellow card) 90+3'	Report	Sneijder 13'; Eto'o 41'; Maicon (yellow card) 48'	Stadium: De Grolsch Veste; Attendance: 23,800; Referee: Pedro Proença (Portugal)

29 September 2010 2	Internazionale (Italy)	4–0	(Germany) Werder Bremen	Milan, Italy
20:45 CEST (UTC+2)	Eto'o 22', 27', 81'; Sneijder 33'	Report	Jensen (yellow card) 44'; Prödl (yellow card) 63'	Stadium: San Siro; Attendance: 48,126; Referee: Alberto Undiano Mallenco (Spain)

20 October 2010 3	Internazionale (Italy)	4–3	(England) Tottenham Hotspur	Milan, Italy
20:45 CEST (UTC+2)	Zanetti 2'; Eto'o 11' (pen.), 35'; Stanković 15'; Chivu (yellow card) 17'	Report	Gomes (red card) 8'; Bale 52', 90', 90+1'; Palacios (yellow card) 89'	Stadium: San Siro; Attendance: 49,551; Referee: Damir Skomina (Slovenia)

2 November 2010 4	Tottenham Hotspur (England)	3–1	(Italy) Internazionale	London, England
20:45 CET (UTC+1)	Van der Vaart 18'; Hutton (yellow card) 39'; Crouch 61'; Jenas (yellow card) 72'; Pavlyuchenko 89'; Modrić (yellow card) 90+2'	Report	Samuel (yellow card) 36'; Chivu (yellow card) 51'; Eto'o; 80'; Lúcio (yellow card) 86'	Stadium: White Hart Lane; Attendance: 34,103; Referee: Viktor Kassai (Hungary)

24 November 2010 5	Internazionale (Italy)	1–0	(Netherlands) Twente	Milan, Italy
20:45 CET (UTC+1)	Cambiasso 55'; Córdoba (yellow card) 75'; Lúcio (yellow card) 90+3'	Report	Leugers (yellow card) 73'	Stadium: San Siro; Attendance: 29,466; Referee: Stéphane Lannoy (France)

7 December 2010 6	Werder Bremen (Germany)	3–0	(Italy) Internazionale	Bremen, Germany
20:45 CET (UTC+1)	Prödl 38'; Arnautović 49'; Pasanen (yellow card) 68'; Pizarro 88'	Report		Stadium: Weserstadion; Attendance: 30,400; Referee: Cüneyt Çakır (Turkey)

==== Knockout phase ====
===== Round of 16 =====
23 February 2011 First leg	Internazionale (Italy)	0–1	(Germany) Bayern Munich	Milan, Italy
20:45 CET (UTC+1)	Zanetti (yellow card) 21'; Sneijder (yellow card) 56'; Motta (yellow card) 88'	Report	Ribéry (yellow card) 34'; Luiz Gustavo (yellow card) 88'; Gómez 90'	Stadium: San Siro; Attendance: 75,925; Referee: Viktor Kassai (Hungary)

15 March 2011 Second leg	Bayern Munich (Germany)	2–3 (3–3 (a) agg.)	(Italy) Internazionale	Munich, Germany
20:45 CET (UTC+1)	Gómez 21'; Müller 31'; Luiz Gustavo (yellow card) 38'	Report	Eto'o 3'; Lúcio (yellow card) 59'; Sneijder 63'; Pandev 88', (yellow card) 88'; Kharja (yellow card) 90+1'; Motta (yellow card) 90+4'	Stadium: Allianz Arena; Attendance: 66,000; Referee: Pedro Proença (Portugal)

===== Quarter-finals =====
5 April 2011 First leg	Internazionale (Italy)	2–5	(Germany) Schalke 04	Milan, Italy
20:45 CET (UTC+1)	Stanković 1', (yellow card) 13'; Milito 34'; Chivu (yellow card) 53' (yellow-red card) 62'	Report	Matip 17'; Edu 40', 75'; Farfán (yellow card) 47'; Raúl 53', (yellow card) 85'; Ranocchia 57' (o.g.); Sarpei (yellow card) 60'; Papadopoulos (yellow card) 67'	Stadium: San Siro; Attendance: 72,770; Referee: Martin Atkinson (England)

13 April 2011 Second leg	Schalke 04 (Germany)	2–1 (7–3 agg.)	(Italy) Internazionale	Gelsenkirchen, Germany
20:45 CET (UTC+1)	Raúl (yellow card) 42', (goal) 45'; Papadopoulos (yellow card) 66'; Höwedes 81'; Schmitz (yellow card) 87'	Report	Lúcio (yellow card) 30'; Motta 49', (yellow card) 58'; Ranocchia (yellow card) 90'	Stadium: Veltins-Arena; Attendance: 54,142; Referee: Damir Skomina (Slovenia)

=== UEFA Super Cup ===
27 August 2010 Final	Internazionale (Italy)	0–2	(Spain) Atlético Madrid	Monaco
20:45 CEST	Milito (penalty missed) 90'; Samuel (yellow card) 90+2'	Report	Reyes 62'; Agüero 83'; Simão (yellow card) 85'; García (yellow card) 89'	Stadium: Stade Louis II; Attendance: 17,265; Referee: Massimo Busacca (Switzerland)

=== FIFA Club World Cup ===
15 December 2010 Semi-finals	Seongnam Ilhwa Chunma (South Korea)	0–3	(Italy) Internazionale	Abu Dhabi, United Arab Emirates
21:00	Ognenovski (yellow card) 31'	Report	Stanković 3'; Zanetti 32'; Milito 73'	Stadium: Zayed Sports City; Attendance: 35,995; Referee: Roberto Moreno (Panama)

18 December 2010 Final	TP Mazembe (Democratic Republic of the Congo)	0–3	(Italy) Internazionale	Abu Dhabi, United Arab Emirates
21:00	Kaluyituka (yellow card) 12'; Ekanga (yellow card) 33'; Mbenza (yellow card) 43'; Kasusula (yellow card) 84'	Report	Pandev 13'; Eto'o 17'; Motta (yellow card) 79'; Biabiany 85'	Stadium: Zayed Sports City; Attendance: 42,174; Referee: Yuichi Nishimura (Japan)

== Statistics ==
=== Squad statistics ===
	Total	Home	Away	Neutral
Games played	45	21	21	3
Games won	26	16	8	2
Games drawn	8	3	5	0
Games lost	11	2	8	1
Biggest win	4–0 (vs. Bari); 4–0 (vs. Werder Bremen)	4–0 (vs. Bari); 4–0 (vs. Werder Bremen)	3–0 (vs. Bari)	3–0 (vs. Seongnam Ilhwa Chunma); 3–0 (vs. TP Mazembe)
Biggest loss	0–3 (vs. Werder Bremen); 0–3 (vs. Milan	0–1 (vs. Milan); 0–1 (vs. Bayern Munich)	0–3 (vs. Werder Bremen); 0–3 (vs. Milan	0–2 (vs. Atlético Madrid)
Biggest win (League)	4–0 (vs. Bari)	4–0 (vs. Bari)	3–0 (vs. Bari)	N/A
Biggest win (Cup)	3–1 (vs. Roma)	3–1 (vs. Roma)	N/A	N/A
Biggest win (Europe)	4–0 (vs. Werder Bremen)	4–0 (vs. Werder Bremen)	–	–
Biggest win (Worldwide)	3–0 (vs. Seongnam Ilhwa Chunma); 3–0 (vs. TP Mazembe)	N/A		3–0 (vs. Seongnam Ilhwa Chunma); 3–0 (vs. TP Mazembe)
Biggest loss (League)	0–3 (vs. Milan	0–1 (vs. Milan)	0–3 (vs. Milan	N/A
Biggest loss (Cup)	–	–	N/A	N/A
Biggest loss (Europe)	2–5 (vs. Schalke 04)	2–5 (vs. Schalke 04)	0–3 (vs. Werder Bremen)	0–2 (vs. Atlético Madrid)
Biggest loss (Worldwide)	–	N/A		–
Clean sheets	14	6	6	2
Goals scored	83	53	24	6
Goals conceded	54	24	28	2
Goal difference	+29	+29	−4	+4
Average GF per game	1.84	2.52	1.14	2
Average GA per game	1.2	1.14	1.33	0.67
Points	86/135 (63.7%)	51/63 (80.95%)	29/63 (46.03%)	6/9 (66.67%)
Winning rate	26/45 (57.78%)	16/20 (80%)	8/21 (38.1%)	2/3 (66.67%)
Most appearances	42	(Cameroon) Samuel Eto'o		
Most minutes played	3927	(Cameroon) Samuel Eto'o		
Top scorer	36	(Cameroon) Samuel Eto'o		
Top assister	14	(Cameroon) Samuel Eto'o		

Last updated: 2 April 2011
Source: Competitive matches

Under Rafael Benítez

	Total	Home	Away	Neutral
Games played	25	11	11	3
Games won	12	7	3	2
Games drawn	6	3	3	0
Games lost	7	1	5	1
Clean sheets	9	4	3	2
Goals scored	41	25	10	6
Goals conceded	28	10	16	2
Goal difference	+13	+15	−6	+4
Average GF per game	1.64	2.27	0.91	2
Average GA per game	1.12	0.91	1.45	0.67
Points	42/75 (56%)	24/33 (72.73%)	12/33 (36.36%)	6/9 (66.67%)
Winning rate	12/25 (48%)	7/11 (63.64%)	3/11 (27.27%)	2/3 (66.67%)

Last updated: 18 December 2010
Source: Competitive matches

Under Leonardo

	Total	Home	Away	Neutral
Games played	20	10	10	0
Games won	14	9	5	0
Games drawn	2	0	2	0
Games lost	4	1	3	0
Clean sheets	4	1	3	0
Goals scored	42	28	14	0
Goals conceded	26	14	12	0
Goal difference	+16	+14	+2	0
Average GF per game	2.1	2.8	1.4	0
Average GA per game	1.3	1.4	1.2	0
Points	44/60 (73.33%)	27/30 (90%)	17/30 (56.67%)	0/0 (0%)
Winning rate	14/20 (70%)	9/10 (90%)	5/10 (50%)	0/0 (0%)

Last updated: 2 April 2011
Source: Competitive matches

=== Appearances and goals ===
- Updated on 2 April 2011

			Serie A			Champions League			Coppa Italia			Supercoppa Italiana			UEFA Super Cup			Club World Cup			Total		
Nation	No.	Name	GS	App.	Min.	GS	App.	Min.	GS	App.	Min.	GS	App.	Min.	GS	App.	Min.	GS	App.	Min.	GS	App.	Min.
Goalkeepers
(Brazil)	1	Júlio César	20	20	1873	5	5	423	0	0	0	1	1	98	1	1	92	2	2	190	29	29	2676
(Italy)	12	Castellazzi	11	12	1072	2	3	233	2	2	241	0	0	0	0	0	0	0	0	0	15	17	1546
(Italy)	21	Orlandoni	0	0	0	1	1	91	0	0	0	0	0	0	0	0	0	0	0	0	1	1	91
Defenders
(Colombia)	2	Córdoba	15	22	1629	3	4	293	1	1	83	0	0	0	0	0	0	2	2	190	21	29	2195
(Argentina)	4	Zanetti	28	28	2650	6	6	523	2	2	241	1	1	46	1	1	92	2	2	190	40	40	3742
(Brazil)	6	Lúcio	25	25	2349	7	7	626	0	1	64	1	1	98	1	1	92	2	2	190	36	37	3419
(Brazil)	13	Maicon	23	23	2112	6	6	563	2	2	236	1	1	98	1	1	92	1	1	95	34	34	3196
(Italy)	15	Ranocchia	10	11	930	2	2	170	2	2	241	0	0	0	0	0	0	0	0	0	14	15	1341
(Italy)	23	Materazzi	4	5	369	1	1	93	1	1	94	0	1	10	0	0	0	0	0	0	6	8	566
(Argentina)	25	Samuel	8	8	665	3	3	283	0	0	0	1	1	98	1	1	92	0	0	0	13	13	1138
(Romania)	26	Chivu	21	21	1867	5	5	429	1	1	147	1	1	98	1	1	92	2	2	134	31	31	2767
(Italy)	36	Benedetti	0	0	0	0	0	0	0	0	0	0	0	0	0	0	0	0	0	0	0	0	0
(Japan)	55	Nagatomo	4	7	392	0	1	8	0	0	0	0	0	0	0	0	0	0	0	0	4	8	400
(Italy)	57	Natalino	1	2	132	0	1	37	0	0	0	0	0	0	0	0	0	0	0	0	1	3	169
Midfielders
(Serbia)	5	Stanković	18	22	1638	5	5	369	1	1	63	0	1	52	1	1	68	1	2	134	26	32	2324
(Italy)	8	Thiago Motta	12	15	1157	3	3	263	1	1	147	0	0	0	0	0	0	1	2	180	17	21	1747
(Netherlands)	10	Sneijder	21	22	1932	7	7	650	0	0	0	1	1	88	1	1	79	1	1	4	31	32	2753
(Morocco)	14	Kharja	5	10	511	0	2	23	0	0	0	0	0	0	0	0	0	0	0	0	5	12	534
(Kenya)	17	Mariga	2	9	276	1	2	112	1	1	178	0	1	19	0	0	0	0	1	6	4	14	591
(Argentina)	19	Cambiasso	22	24	1945	5	5	560	2	2	241	1	1	98	1	1	92	2	2	190	33	35	3126
(Nigeria)	20	Obi	2	8	237	0	1	12	0	1	23	0	0	0	0	0	0	0	0	0	2	10	272
(Brazil)	29	Coutinho	7	12	742	2	5	291	0	0	0	0	0	0	0	1	13	0	0	0	9	18	1046
(Italy)	34	Biraghi	0	0	0	1	2	93	0	0	0	0	0	0	0	0	0	0	0	0	1	2	93
(Italy)	48	Crisetig	0	0	0	0	0	0	0	0	0	0	0	0	0	0	0	0	0	0	0	0	0
Forwards
(Italy)	7	Pazzini	10	11	893	0	0	0	0	0	0	0	0	0	0	0	0	0	0	0	10	11	893
(Cameroon)	9	Eto'o	28	28	2583	8	8	747	2	2	218	1	1	98	1	1	92	2	2	190	42	42	3948
(Honduras)	18	Suazo	0	0	0	0	0	0	0	0	0	0	0	0	0	0	0	0	0	0	0	0	0
(Argentina)	22	Milito	13	17	1165	1	2	110	0	0	0	1	1	98	1	1	92	2	2	153	18	23	1618
(North Macedonia)	27	Pandev	16	24	1631	5	6	436	2	2	241	1	1	79	0	1	24	2	2	190	26	36	2510
(Romania)	31	Alibec	0	2	65	0	0	0	0	0	0	0	0	0	0	0	0	0	0	0	0	2	65
(Italy)	54	Dell'Agnello	0	0	0	0	0	0	0	0	0	0	0	0	0	0	0	0	0	0	0	0	0
Players no longer in team
(Ghana)	11	Muntari	1	8	238	2	3	153	1	1	58	0	0	0	0	0	0	0	1	14	4	13	463
(Colombia)	24	Rivas	0	0	0	0	0	0	0	1	5	0	0	0	0	0	0	0	0	0	0	1	5
(Brazil)	30	Mancini	0	2	15	0	0	0	0	0	0	0	0	0	0	0	0	0	0	0	0	2	15
(Italy)	39	Santon	5	11	523	1	4	135	1	1	94	0	0	0	0	0	0	0	1	17	7	17	769
(Nigeria)	40	Nwankwo	0	2	52	1	3	137	0	0	0	0	0	0	0	0	0	0	0	0	1	5	189
(France)	88	Biabiany	9	13	735	4	5	354	0	1	36	0	0	0	0	0	0	0	1	23	13	20	1148

- GS=Games started
- App.=Appearances
- Min.=Minutes

=== Starting 11 ===
Considering starts in all competitions
As of 2 April

No.	Pos.	Nat.	Name	MS	Notes
1	GK	(Brazil)	Júlio César	29	
13	RB	(Brazil)	Maicon	34	
6	CB	(Brazil)	Lúcio	36	
2	CB	(Colombia)	Iván Córdoba	21	
26	LB	(Romania)	Cristian Chivu	31	
4	CM	(Argentina)	Javier Zanetti	40	
19	CM	(Argentina)	Esteban Cambiasso	33	
5	CM	(Serbia)	Dejan Stanković	26	
10	AM	(Netherlands)	Wesley Sneijder	31	
27	CF	(North Macedonia)	Goran Pandev	26	
9	CF	(Cameroon)	Samuel Eto'o	42	

=== Goalscorers ===
No.	Pos.	Nation	Name	Serie A	Coppa Italia	Supercoppa Italiana	Champions League	UEFA Super Cup	Club World Cup	Total
9	FW	(Cameroon)	Samuel Eto'o	21	5	2	8	0	1	37
7	FW	(Italy)	Giampaolo Pazzini	11	0	0	0	0	0	11
5	MF	(Serbia)	Dejan Stanković	5	1	0	2	0	1	9
22	MF	(Argentina)	Esteban Cambiasso	7	0	0	1	0	0	8
22	FW	(Argentina)	Diego Milito	5	1	0	1	0	1	8
10	MF	(Netherlands)	Wesley Sneijder	4	0	0	3	0	0	7
27	FW	(North Macedonia)	Goran Pandev	2	0	1	1	0	1	5
8	MF	(Italy)	Thiago Motta	4	0	0	1	0	0	5
4	DF	(Argentina)	Javier Zanetti	0	0	0	1	0	1	2
6	DF	(Brazil)	Lúcio	1	0	0	0	0	0	1
11	MF	(Ghana)	Sulley Muntari	1	0	0	0	0	0	1
14	MF	(Morocco)	Houssine Kharja	1	0	0	0	0	0	1
15	DF	(Italy)	Andrea Ranocchia	1	0	0	0	0	0	1
17	MF	(Kenya)	McDonald Mariga	0	1	0	0	0	0	1
26	DF	(Romania)	Christian Chivu	1	0	0	0	0	0	1
55	DF	(Japan)	Yuto Nagatomo	1	0	0	0	0	0	1
88	FW	(France)	Jonathan Biabiany	0	0	0	0	0	1	1
#	Own goals			1	0	0	0	0	0	1
TOTAL				66	8	3	17	0	6	100

Last updated: 29 May 2011

=== Disciplinary record ===
- Updated on 2 April 2011

				Serie A		Champions League		Coppa Italia		Italian Super Cup		UEFA Super Cup		Club World Cup		Total	
Position	Nation	Number	Name	Yellow card	Red card	Yellow card	Red card	Yellow card	Red card	Yellow card	Red card	Yellow card	Red card	Yellow card	Red card	Yellow card	Red card
MF	(Italy)	8	Motta	5	0	2	0	1	0	0	0	0	0	1	0	9	0
DF	(Romania)	26	Chivu	6	1	2	0	0	0	0	0	0	0	0	0	8	1
DF	(Brazil)	6	Lúcio	4	0	3	0	1	0	0	0	0	0	0	0	8	0
DF	(Brazil)	13	Maicon	6	0	1	0	0	0	0	0	0	0	0	0	7	0
DF	(Colombia)	2	Córdoba	4	1	1	0	0	0	0	0	0	0	0	0	5	1
MF	(Serbia)	5	Stanković	5	0	0	0	0	0	0	0	0	0	0	0	5	0
DF	(Argentina)	4	Zanetti	3	0	1	0	0	0	0	0	0	0	0	0	4	0
DF	(Argentina)	25	Samuel	0	0	1	0	0	0	1	0	1	0	0	0	3	0
MF	(Ghana)	11	Muntari	2	0	0	0	1	0	0	0	0	0	0	0	3	0
FW	(Cameroon)	9	Eto'o	3	0	0	0	0	0	0	0	0	0	0	0	3	0
FW	(North Macedonia)	27	Pandev	2	0	1	0	0	0	0	0	0	0	0	0	3	0
MF	(Morocco)	14	Kharja	2	0	1	0	0	0	0	0	0	0	0	0	3	0
DF	(Italy)	15	Ranocchia	1	0	0	0	1	0	0	0	0	0	0	0	2	0
DF	(Italy)	23	Materazzi	2	0	0	0	0	0	0	0	0	0	0	0	2	0
MF	(Netherlands)	10	Sneijder	1	0	1	0	0	0	0	0	0	0	0	0	2	0
MF	(Kenya)	17	Mariga	2	0	0	0	0	0	0	0	0	0	0	0	2	0
MF	(Argentina)	19	Cambiasso	0	0	0	0	0	0	1	0	0	0	0	0	1	0
DF	(Italy)	39	Santon	1	0	0	0	0	0	0	0	0	0	0	0	1	0
MF	(Brazil)	29	Coutinho	1	0	0	0	0	0	0	0	0	0	0	0	1	0
FW	(Argentina)	22	Milito	1	0	0	0	0	0	0	0	0	0	0	0	1	0
TOTALS				51	2	14	1	4	0	2	0	1	0	1	0	73	2

=== Goals conceded ===
- Updated on 2 April 2011

Position	Nation	Number	Name	Serie A	Champions League	Coppa Italia	Italian Super Cup	UEFA Super Cup	Club World Cup	Total	Minutes per goal
GK	(Brazil)	1	Júlio César	17	8	0	1	2	0	28	95.57
GK	(Italy)	12	Luca Castellazzi	17	3	2	0	0	0	22	70.27
GK	(Italy)	21	Paolo Orlandoni	0	3	0	0	0	0	3	30.33
TOTALS				34	14	2	1	2	0	53	81.4

=== Own goals ===
- Updated on 14 September 2010

Position	Nation	Number	Name	Serie A	Champions League	Coppa Italia	Italian Super Cup	UEFA Super Cup	Club World Cup	Total
FW	(Argentina)	22	Diego Milito	0	1	0	0	0	0	1
TOTALS				0	1	0	0	0	0	1

=== Suspensions during the season ===
Date	Player	Suspension for	Punishment	Source
November 23, 2010	(Cameroon) Samuel Eto'o	Headbutt Chievo's player Boštjan Cesar	Three-match ban (Lazio, Parma & Napoli) & €30,000 fine	inter.it
January 23, 2011	(Colombia) Iván Córdoba	Fourth yellow card in Serie A	One-match ban (Palermo)	
January 23, 2011	(Romania) Cristian Chivu	Fourth yellow card in Serie A	One-match ban (Palermo)	
January 23, 2011	(Serbia) Dejan Stanković	Fourth yellow card in Serie A	One-match ban (Palermo)	
February 3, 2011	(Romania) Cristian Chivu	Punch Bari's Marco Rossi in the face	Four-match ban (Roma, Juventus, Fiorentina & Cagliari)	football-italia.net inter.it
February 13, 2011	(Italy) Thiago Motta	Fourth yellow card in Serie A	One-match ban (Fiorentina)	inter.it
February 25, 2011	(Brazil) Maicon	Fourth yellow card in Serie A	One-match ban (Sampdoria)	inter.it
March 14, 2011	(Brazil) Lúcio	Fourth yellow card in Serie A	One-match ban (Milan)	

Last updated: April 2, 2011

=== Injuries during the season ===
Date	Player	Injury	Estimated Return Date	Source
18 August 2010	(Honduras) David Suazo	Muscular problem	March–April 2011	inter.it
November 6, 2010	(Argentina) Walter Samuel (2)	Severe injury of the anterior cruciate ligament and the outer side of the right knee	May–July 2011	inter.it

Last updated: April 2, 2011

Back in action

Date	Player	Injury	Date of injury	Number of matches (Total)	Source
August 4, 2010	(Italy) Davide Santon	Clean-up surgery on his right knee	April 7, 2010	12	inter.it
September 14, 2010	(Brazil) Maicon	Knee problem	August 27, 2010	2	inter.it
September 19, 2010	(Serbia) Dejan Stanković	Hamstring muscle strain in his left thigh	September 10, 2010	2	inter.it
September 22, 2010	(Netherlands) Wesley Sneijder	Foot injury	September 17, 2010	1	inter.it
October 3, 2010	(Argentina) Diego Milito	Slight thigh strain in right leg	September 25, 2010	1	inter.it
October 17, 2010	(Argentina) Javier Zanetti	Post-traumatic pneumothrorax	September 21, 2010	4	inter.it
October 17, 2010	(Argentina) Walter Samuel	Right thigh muscle strain	September 22, 2010	3	inter.it
October 17, 2010	(Italy) Thiago Motta	Surgery on his right knee	August 20, 2010	10	inter.it
October 20, 2010	(North Macedonia) Goran Pandev	Ankle problem	September 25, 2010	3	inter.it
October 20, 2010	(Colombia) Iván Córdoba	Sustained a biceps femoris strain in his left leg	October 3, 2010	1	inter.it
October 24, 2010	(Argentina) Esteban Cambiasso	First-degree strain left hamstring muscles	October 8, 2010	2	inter.it
November 2, 2010	(Argentina) Diego Milito (2)	First- to second-degree strain left hamstring muscles	October 8, 2010	4 (5)	inter.it
November 10, 2010	(Serbia) Dejan Stanković (2)	Right calf strain	October 20, 2010	4 (6)	inter.it
November 14, 2010	(Netherlands) Wesley Sneijder (2)	Fainted during half time	November 6, 2010	1 (2)	inter.it
November 21, 2010	(Argentina) Esteban Cambiasso (2)	Sustained posterior thigh strains in his left leg	October 29, 2010	4 (6)	inter.it
November 28, 2010	(Italy) Thiago Motta (2)	Knee problem	October 21, 2010	7 (17)	inter.it
December 3, 2010	(Ghana) Sulley Muntari	Right calf strain	November 2, 2010	6	inter.it
December 7, 2010	(Kenya) McDonald Mariga	Muscular problem	October 13, 2010	12	inter.it
December 15, 2010	(Brazil) Júlio César	Sustained posterior thigh strains in his right leg	October 29, 2010	9	inter.it
December 15, 2010	(Argentina) Diego Milito (3)	First degree muscle pull at the base of his left hamstring	November 14, 2010	5 (10)	inter.it
December 15, 2010	(Romania) Cristian Chivu	Thigh strain in his right leg	November 17, 2010	5	inter.it
December 18, 2010	(Brazil) Maicon (2)	Muscle strain in the back of the left thigh	November 6, 2010	7 (9)	inter.it
January 12, 2011	(Nigeria) Joel Obi	Second degree muscle pull in his left hamstring	November 14, 2010	9	inter.it
January 12, 2011	(Colombia) Nelson Rivas	Fitness problem	August 18, 2010	27	inter.it
January 23, 2011	(Italy) Thiago Motta (3)	Minor injury	January 18, 2011	1 (18)	inter.it
January 30, 2011	(Brazil) Philippe Coutinho	Pulled hamstring	November 19, 2010	14	inter.it
January 30, 2011	(Brazil) Júlio César (2)	Strained a thigh muscle	January 4, 2011	7 (16)	inter.it
January 30, 2011	(Argentina) Diego Milito (4)	First degree muscle strain to the biceps femoris in his left hamstring	January 19, 2011	2 (12)	inter.it
February 3, 2011	(Netherlands) Wesley Sneijder (3)	Foot injury	December 14, 2010	9 (11)	inter.it
February 6, 2011	(Argentina) Esteban Cambiasso (3)	Hamstring strain in his left thigh	February 3, 2011	0 (6)	inter.it
February 6, 2011	(Colombia) Iván Córdoba (2)	Dislocated shoulder	January 27, 2011	2 (3)	inter.it
February 6, 2011	(Italy) Luca Castellazzi	Right hand injury	January 29, 2011	2	inter.it
February 16, 2011	(Serbia) Dejan Stanković (3)	Pulled a muscle in this right thigh	January 27, 2011	4 (10)	inter.it
February 16, 2011	(Kenya) McDonald Mariga (2)	Srain in his right hamstring, more specifically to the biceps femoris and of a post-traumatic nature	January 28, 2011	4 (16)	inter.it
February 23, 2011	(Brazil) Lúcio	Pulled an adductor muscle in his right thigh	January 31, 2011	5	inter.it
April 2, 2011	(Argentina) Diego Milito (5)	Second-degree hamstring strain	February 7, 2011	9 (21)	inter.it

== Awards ==
=== Individual ===
Player	Nat.	Award	Source
Wesley Sneijder	(Netherlands)	World Cup Silver Ball	fifa.com
Wesley Sneijder	(Netherlands)	World Cup Bronze Boot	fifa.com
Wesley Sneijder	(Netherlands)	World Cup All-Star Team	bbc.co.uk
Maicon	(Brazil)	World Cup All-Star Team	bbc.co.uk
Júlio César	(Brazil)	UEFA Club Best Goalkeeper of the Year	uefa.com
Maicon	(Brazil)	UEFA Club Best Defender of the Year	uefa.com
Wesley Sneijder	(Netherlands)	UEFA Club Best Midfielder of the Year	uefa.com
Diego Milito	(Argentina)	UEFA Club Best Forward of the Year	uefa.com
Diego Milito	(Argentina)	UEFA Club Footballer of the Year	uefa.com
Javier Zanetti	(Argentina)	Gaetano Scirea career achievement	inter.it
Samuel Eto'o	(Cameroon)	FIFA Ballon d'Or (shortlist of 23 players)	inter.it
Júlio César	(Brazil)	FIFA Ballon d'Or (shortlist of 23 players)	inter.it
Maicon	(Brazil)	FIFA Ballon d'Or (shortlist of 23 players)	inter.it
Wesley Sneijder	(Netherlands)	FIFA Ballon d'Or (shortlist of 23 players)	inter.it
Samuel Eto'o	(Cameroon)	African Footballer of the Year	inter.it
Dejan Stanković	(Serbia)	Serbian Footballer of the Year	inter.it
Goran Pandev	(North Macedonia)	Macedonian Player of the Year	inter.it
Maicon	(Brazil)	Samba d'Or (best Brazilian player in Europe)	inter.it inter.it
José Mourinho	(Portugal)	The World's best Club Coach by IFFHS	iffhs.de
Maicon	(Brazil)	FIFA/FIFPro World XI	fifa.com
Lúcio	(Brazil)	FIFA/FIFPro World XI	fifa.com
Wesley Sneijder	(Netherlands)	FIFA/FIFPro World XI	fifa.com
José Mourinho	(Portugal)	FIFA World Coach of the Year for Men's Football	fifa.com
Maicon	(Brazil)	UEFA Team of the Year	uefa.com
Wesley Sneijder	(Netherlands)	UEFA Team of the Year	uefa.com
José Mourinho	(Portugal)	UEFA Team of the Year	uefa.com
Diego Milito	(Argentina)	Serie A Footballer of the Year	inter.it
Diego Milito	(Argentina)	Serie A Foreign Footballer of the Year	inter.it
Júlio César	(Brazil)	Serie A Goalkeeper of the Year	inter.it
Walter Samuel	(Argentina)	Serie A Defender of the Year	inter.it
José Mourinho	(Portugal)	Serie A Coach of the Year	inter.it
Maicon	(Brazil)	Serie A Goal of the Year	inter.it
Samuel Eto'o	(Cameroon)	Serie A Foreign Footballer of the Year	inter.it
Wesley Sneijder	(Netherlands)	Serie A Foreign Footballer of the Year	inter.it
Mario Balotelli	(Italy)	Serie A Young Footballer of the Year	inter.it
Andrea Ranocchia	(Italy)	Gillette Future Champion	inter.it
José Mourinho	(Portugal)	Albo Panchina d'Oro	inter.it

italic: nominated

=== Team ===
Award name	Source
European Club of the Year	inter.it
Guirlande D'Honneur by the FICTS	inter.it
The World's best Club by IFFHS	iffhs.de
Laureus World Sports	inter.it
Serie A Team of the Year	inter.it
Sporting Merit	inter.it
2010 Gianni Brera	inter.it
5th Europe's Club of the 1st Decade of the 21st Century	iffhs.de
Ambrogino d'Oro	inter.it

italic: nominated
