= Davide Santon =

Italian footballer (born 1991)

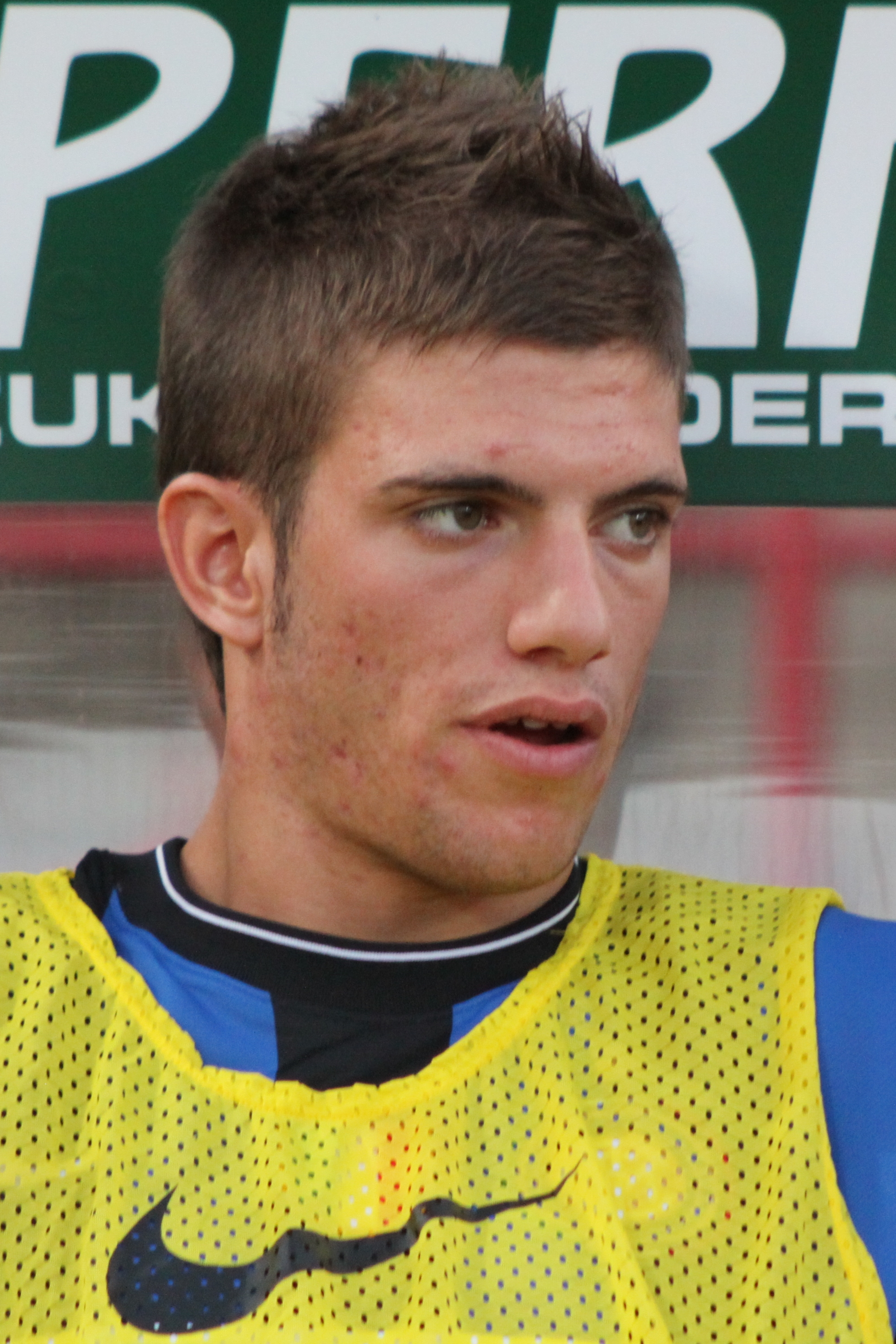
- Santon with Inter Milan in 2009

Personal information
- Full name: Davide Santon
- Date of birth: 2 January 1991 (age 35)
- Place of birth: Portomaggiore, Italy
- Height: 1.87 m (6 ft 2 in)
- Position: Full back

Youth career
- 1999–2005: Ravenna
- 2005–2008: Inter Milan

Senior career*
Years	Team	Apps	(Gls)
2008–2011	Inter Milan	40	(0)
2011	→ Cesena (loan)	11	(0)
2011–2015	Newcastle United	82	(1)
2015–2018	Inter Milan	50	(0)
2018–2022	Roma	42	(0)
Total		225	(1)

International career
2007	Italy U16	4	(2)
2007–2008	Italy U17	12	(2)
2008	Italy U20	2	(0)
2009–2013	Italy U21	17	(0)
2009–2013	Italy	8	(0)
- * Club domestic league appearances and goals

Davide Santon (Italian pronunciation: [ˈdaːvide sanˈton]; born 2 January 1991) is an Italian former professional footballer who played as a left wing-back.

A former Inter Milan youth product, Santon began his professional club career with Inter in 2008, and remained with the club until 2011, aside from a spell on loan with Cesena. He later had a four-year spell with English club Newcastle United, before returning to Inter in 2015. After three seasons, he signed with Roma.

After emerging through the youth ranks at Inter Milan, Santon was considered among the most promising young fullbacks in world football. However, persistent injury problems hindered his progress and number of appearances. In 2022, Santon announced his retirement at the age of 31, citing injury problems.

At international level, Santon made his senior debut with Italy in 2009, represented his nation at the FIFA Confederations Cup later that year, and earned 8 caps in total.

== Club career ==
=== Inter Milan ===
At the age of 14, Santon joined Inter Milan's youth system from Ravenna. He started out as a winger before moving into a defensive role. After helping the Inter Milan under-20 side win the 2006–07 Campionato Nazionale Primavera and reaching the final play-off for a second consecutive season, he was called up to join the first team for the 2008–09 pre-season training in South Tyrol and training sessions during the first half of the season.

José Mourinho first named Santon in the line-up for a September Champions League match against Panathinaikos and the next three games, but did not use him. On 21 January 2009, Santon made his debut in the Coppa Italia quarter-final win against Roma, playing the entire match. Four days later, he made his Serie A debut in a 1–0 victory against Sampdoria. He made his European debut in the home draw against Manchester United, tasked with marking Cristiano Ronaldo. Santon garnered praise for his performance prompting Ronaldo to comment, "I was impressed by Santon, he is a really interesting lad and a great footballer." Mourinho praised Santon for his personality and tactical versatility and Santon was handed the starting role for the next game. He started 13 league games and made two substitute appearances, thus winning his first senior honour, the Serie A title.

Santon had also become the subject of praise by former Italy national team head coach Marcello Lippi in 2009, who described Santon as, "A predestined player that reminds him of a young Paolo Maldini."

Santon made his first appearance for Inter in the 2009–10 season against Parma in the third game of the season, and subsequently started the game against Cagliari the following week. He was out until the New Year after sustaining a right knee lateral meniscus injury while on international duty. He made his return in January as a substitute against Bari and was called back into the starting eleven to replace the injured Cristian Chivu. However, his return was short-lived as he injured the same knee again after returning too soon from the previous injury and required surgery, thus sidelining him for another three to five weeks.

During the 2010–11 season, Santon first served as an understudy of Cristian Chivu, but after Maicon's injury (and a later injury to Chivu), Santon returned to the starting line-up in November (save for the Derby della Madonnina against Milan and matchday 5 of the Champions League). He then played twice as a right wing-forward due to the injury crisis at Inter, the first one in a 5–2 win against Parma. In that match, manager Rafael Benítez preferred Iván Córdoba and Javier Zanetti in both full-back positions, as well as for the Champions League against Twente.

==== Cesena (loan) ====
On 31 January 2011, the final day of the transfer window, Santon was sent out on loan to Cesena as part of the deal that saw Yuto Nagatomo join Inter in exchange.

Santon returned to Inter in the summer. Under new coach Gian Piero Gasperini, Santon often played as a wing-back in their 3–4–3 formation in the friendlies. Near the end of the summer transfer window, however, the club kept Davide Faraoni as backup wing-back and sold Santon.

=== Newcastle United ===
On 30 August 2011, Santon signed for Premier League club Newcastle United on a five-year contract, for an undisclosed fee; according to Inter, Santon was sold for €4 million. On 16 October, he made his debut for Newcastle as a second-half substitute against Tottenham Hotspur. He went on to make his first start for the club in December away to Norwich City, before making his full home debut the next week against Swansea City. On 2 May 2012, Santon assisted Papiss Cissé's first goal in a 2–0 win over Chelsea.

In the 2012–13 season, Santon became a regular in the starting line-up. He provided three assists to his teammates during the season: two against Chelsea for Jonás Gutiérrez and Moussa Sissoko, and one against Wigan Athletic for Demba Ba, as well as causing an own goal to be scored by Southampton's Jos Hooiveld. On 17 March 2013, Santon scored his first and only goal for Newcastle (as well as his only goal of his professional career) in a 2–1 defeat to Wigan. On 4 April, in the first leg of the Europa League quarter-final against Benfica, Santon's misplaced backpass allowed Lima to round Tim Krul and score from a tight angle. Afterwards, he was photographed apologising to the club's travelling support by holding his hands up, which would become the defining image of his Newcastle career. Three days later, Santon came off early in the first half with a hamstring injury against Fulham. He would miss the second leg as Benfica advanced into the semi-finals, and ultimately, the injury kept him out for the rest of the season.

In the following season, he remained a regular in the side until February 2014, when he was ruled out with a knee problem and then tonsillitis. On 29 March, he made his return as a second-half substitute against Southampton, but allowed Rickie Lambert to get past him and score in an eventual 4–0 win for the Saints. Post-match, he was again photographed apologising to the supporters by holding his hands up, and later stated that they had the right to boo the team. Although he played the full 90 minutes against Manchester United, he missed four matches due to another hamstring injury, and was an unused substitute for the final match of the season against Liverpool. In the 2014–15 season, a knee injury saw Santon miss much of Newcastle's campaign, but by the end of the year, he had returned to the squad for a home match against Everton. However, his only appearance for the club came in a FA Cup third round loss against Leicester City. After his loan back to Inter Milan was announced, Santon's fiancée claimed that he did not want to leave the club and that he had been "fully fit for a while, with no chance to play", before going on to criticise the club's hierarchy, "whose only intentions are to make [money]".

=== Return to Inter ===
After losing his first-team place to Paul Dummett, Santon returned to Inter in the 2015 January transfer window on loan, with an option to buy in the summer. Santon was also eligible to one of the four quota for club-trained players in UEFA competitions, otherwise Inter's squad would be forced to be reduced by vacating the quota. (Inter filled the quota with reserve players Giacomo Sciacca and Isaac Donkor, first team player Rene Krhin (first half), Joel Obi and Marco Andreolli in the 2014–15 season) The loan was made permanent in summer 2015. According to Inter, the transfer (including agent fee and other costs) had cost the club €4.893 million.

Santon was once available in the 2016 transfer market, which Sunderland were in negotiations with Inter, as well as an alleged failed medical at West Ham United. However, Santon remained in Inter's squad, as they only had three available players eligible for the aforementioned quota in the Europa League (himself, Marco Andreolli and Jonathan Biabiany), with Serie A also imposing a similar homegrown rule. The club was also forced to reduce the European squad to a maximum of 22 as a penalty for breaching UEFA Financial Fair Play Regulations. Eventually Inter had a 21-men squad, with one quota for an Inter youth product not used. Santon was an unused substitute for Inter in the opening match of the Europa League; he was the starting full-back in their 2–1 win over defending Serie A champions Juventus in the Derby d'Italia.

After Frank de Boer was sacked in 2016, Santon was rarely used by new coach Stefano Pioli. In the 2017–18 season, he was included in Luciano Spalletti's pre-season camp in July 2017. However, Santon was left out of the squad to Asia due to injury.

=== Roma ===
In June 2018, it was reported that Santon and Nicolò Zaniolo would join Roma as part of the deal of Radja Nainggolan to Inter. Santon and Zaniolo arrived in Rome for medicals on 25 June. The transfers were completed on 26 June, which Santon had a price tag of €9.5 million, signing a 4-year contract. He made his debut for the capital club on 31 August, coming off the bench for Rick Karsdorp in the league match against Milan. He made his Champions League debut with the Giallorossi on 23 October, as he was in the starting line-up of a 3–0 victory against CSKA Moscow.

On 3 October 2019, Santon made his Europa League debut for Roma in a 1–1 away draw against Wolfsberger AC, starting the game at right-back.

After three years in which he failed to permanently win the starting job, partly due to recurring injuries, as well as testing positive for COVID-19, he was on the fringes of the first-team squad in the 2021–22 season under new head coach José Mourinho, failing to make any appearances. On 9 September 2022, Santon announced his retirement from professional football at the age of 31, due to recurring knee injuries.

== International career ==
Santon played for Italy from under-16 level and made his goal-scoring debut in April 2007 in a 3–1 win over Slovenia. On 31 March 2009, he made his debut for the under-21 squad in a friendly against the Netherlands, played at Parkstad Limburg Stadion, Kerkrade, which ended in a 1–1 draw.

Santon made his debut with the senior Italian team at age 18, on 6 June 2009 in a friendly match against Northern Ireland, played in Pisa. On the same night future Newcastle United teammate Shane Ferguson made his debut as a substitute for the visitors. He played the whole match and his solid performances in Italy's 3–0 win earned him praise from his peers as well as coach Marcello Lippi. Lippi was impressed enough to name him in the roster for the 2009 FIFA Confederations Cup, but Santon did not manage to make an appearance in the tournament as Italy went out in the first round. After some strong performances since signing with Newcastle, Santon was recalled to the national team under manager Cesare Prandelli for the friendly against France in November 2012, however he did not come off the bench in the 1–2 home defeat. He started his next game for Italy, earning his eighth international cap on 6 February 2013, in a 1–1 draw against the Netherlands.

Shortly after rejoining Inter Milan, Santon was recalled to the national team under manager Antonio Conte for the friendly against England in March 2015, where he was an unused substitute.

== Style of play ==
Although Santon was usually deployed as a left-back, he is naturally right-footed and started his youth career as a right-sided attacker or winger, later reverting to an attacking full-back or wing-back who could play on both sides of the pitch; he was known in particular for his pacy, energetic runs up and down the flank. Santon also possessed significant physical strength, good dribbling technique, and defensive awareness. Regarded as a promising player in his youth, his precocious displays for Inter and Italy in 2009 led his coaches at the time, José Mourinho and Marcello Lippi respectively, to describe him as a "predestined player", also comparing him to legendary Italian left-backs such as Paolo Maldini and Giacinto Facchetti. In 2010, he was included in the Don Balón list of the best young footballers in the world, born after 1989.

== Personal life ==
In 2020, Santon married his long-term partner, Chloe Sanderson. The couple have two children together.

== Career statistics ==
=== Club ===
Appearances and goals by club, season and competition
Club	Season	League			National Cup (Note: Includes Coppa Italia and FA Cup)		League Cup		Europe		Other		Total	
Club	Season	Division	Apps	Goals	Apps	Goals	Apps	Goals	Apps	Goals	Apps	Goals	Apps	Goals
Inter Milan	2008–09	Serie A	16	0	2	0	—		2 (Note: All appearances in UEFA Champions League)	0	0	0	20	0
Inter Milan	2009–10	Serie A	12	0	2	0	—		1	0	0	0	15	0
Inter Milan	2010–11	Serie A	12	0	1	0	—		4	0	1 (Note: All appearances in FIFA Club World Cup)	0	18	0
Inter Milan	Total		40	0	5	0	—		7	0	1	0	53	0
Cesena (loan)	2010–11	Serie A	11	0	0	0	—		—		—		11	0
Newcastle United	2011–12	Premier League	24	0	2	0	1	0	—		—		27	0
Newcastle United	2012–13	Premier League	31	1	1	0	0	0	6 (Note: All appearances in UEFA Europa League)	0	—		38	1
Newcastle United	2013–14	Premier League	27	0	1	0	0	0	—		—		28	0
Newcastle United	2014–15	Premier League	0	0	1	0	0	0	—		—		1	0
Newcastle United	Total		82	1	5	0	1	0	6	0	0	0	94	1
Inter Milan	2014–15	Serie A	9	0	1	0	—		4	0	—		14	0
Inter Milan	2015–16	Serie A	12	0	1	0	—		—		—		13	0
Inter Milan	2016–17	Serie A	14	0	0	0	—		1	0	—		15	0
Inter Milan	2017–18	Serie A	15	0	0	0	—		—		—		15	0
Inter Milan	Inter total		90	0	7	0	—		12	0	1	0	110	0
Roma	2018–19	Serie A	17	0	0	0	—		4	0	—		21	0
Roma	2019–20	Serie A	15	0	1	0	—		5	0	—		21	0
Roma	2020–21	Serie A	10	0	0	0	—		1	0	—		11	0
Roma	Total		42	0	1	0	—		10	0	—		53	0
Career total			225	1	13	0	1	0	28	0	1	0	268	1

=== International ===
Italy
Year	Apps	Goals
2009	5	0
2010	1	0
2011	1	0
2012	0	0
2013	1	0
Total	8	0

== Honours ==
=== Club ===
Inter Milan

- Serie A: 2008–09, 2009–10
- Coppa Italia: 2009–10, 2010–11
- UEFA Champions League: 2009–10
- FIFA Club World Cup: 2010

Individual

- Newcastle United Player of the Year: 2013
