= Yūto Nagatomo =

Japanese footballer (born 1986)

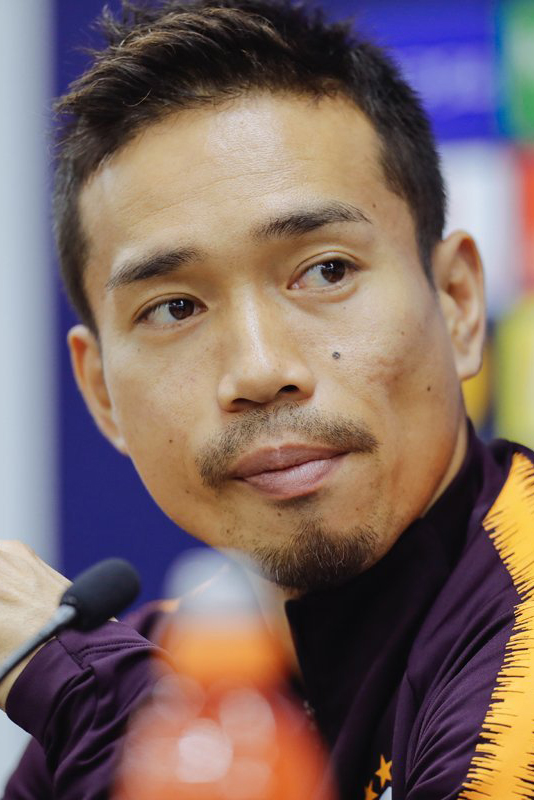
- Nagatomo with Galatasaray in 2018

Personal information
- Full name: Yūto Nagatomo
- Date of birth: 12 September 1986 (age 40)
- Place of birth: Saijō, Ehime, Japan
- Height: 1.70 m (5 ft 7 in)
- Position: Full back

Team information
- Current team: FC Tokyo
- Number: 5

Youth career
- –1998: Kanbai Soccer School
- 1999–2001: Saijo Kita Junior High School
- 2002–2004: Higashi Fukuoka High School

College career
Years	Team	Apps	(Gls)
2005–2007	Meiji University		

Senior career*
Years	Team	Apps	(Gls)
2007–2011	FC Tokyo	72	(5)
2010–2011	→ Cesena (loan)	16	(0)
2011	→ Inter Milan (loan)	13	(2)
2011–2018	Inter Milan	157	(7)
2018	→ Galatasaray (loan)	15	(0)
2018–2020	Galatasaray	32	(2)
2020–2021	Marseille	25	(0)
2021–	FC Tokyo	133	(2)

International career^{‡}
2008	Japan U-23	2	(0)
2008–2026	Japan	146	(4)
Medal record
Representing Japan
AFC Asian Cup
Winner	2011 Qatar
EAFF Championship
Winner	2025 South Korea
- * Club domestic league appearances and goals as of 10 May 2026 ‡ National team caps and goals as of 26 June 2026

Yūto Nagatomo (長友 佑都, Nagatomo Yūto; born 12 September 1986) is a Japanese professional footballer who plays as a full back for J1 League club FC Tokyo.

A Meiji University graduate, Nagatomo started his professional career with FC Tokyo in 2007, quickly establishing himself as a first choice both within the team and the Japan national team. He would go on to play in Europe for over a decade, first joining Cesena in 2010, and then enjoying stints with Inter Milan (where he made over 200 appearances over 7 years), Galatasaray and Olympique Marseille. He would then return to boyhood club FC Tokyo in September 2021.

During his club career, Nagatomo has won a J.League Cup in 2009 (with Tokyo), a Coppa Italia in 2011 (with Inter), two back-to-back Turkish titles in 2018 and 2019, a Turkish Cup and a Turkish Super Cup in 2019. He also won an individual award as AFC's Asian International Player of the Year in 2013.

Having made 146 appearances, Nagatomo is Japan's second-most capped player of all time. Having won his first cap for the Samurai Blue in 2008, the full-back has represented Japan at one edition of the Olympic Games (in 2008), five consecutive World Cups (in 2010, 2014, 2018, 2022 and 2026), three consecutive Asian Cups (in 2011, 2015 and 2019) and one Confederations Cup (in 2013). He was part of the squad that won the Asian Cup in 2011 and the one that finished as runners-up in the same competition in 2019.

== Club career ==
=== FC Tokyo ===
Nagatomo officially signed with FC Tokyo in 2008, while at Meiji. But he made an appearance at J.League Cup as Special Designated Youth Player in 2007. Nagatomo made 84 appearances in his four years at FC Tokyo.

=== Cesena ===
In July 2010, Nagatomo was signed on loan by the newly promoted Serie A side Cesena, where he played the first half of the season as Cesena's starting left back. Before moving to Italy, Nagatomo gave a speech to 25,000 supporters just after the match involving F.C. Tokyo and Vissel Kobe on 17 July 2010. After being signed on a permanent deal, Nagatomo was then sold to Inter Milan.

=== Inter Milan ===
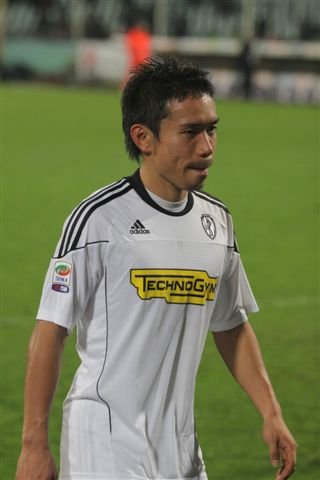
Nagatomo playing for Cesena in 2010

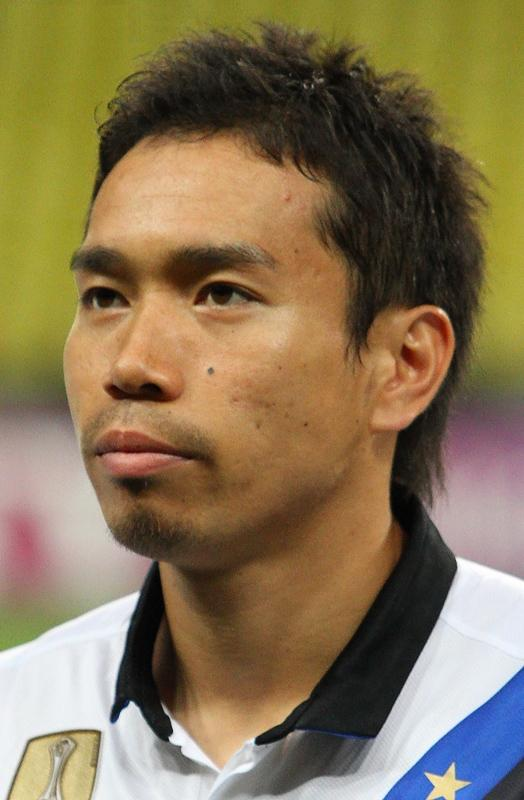
Nagatomo with Inter in 2011

Due to his impressive performances for both Cesena and Japan in the 2011 Asian Cup, he was fully signed by Cesena in January 2011. But before making any league appearances he was sent straight out on loan to Inter Milan in exchange for Davide Santon also on loan, becoming the first East Asian player to sign with Inter Milan.

Nagatomo, wearing number 55, made his debut for Nerazzurri on 6 February 2011, replacing Wesley Sneijder in the Serie A match against Roma, won by Inter 5–3. In the following game, Nagatomo came on as a late substitute against Juventus, before starting in both of the following games against Fiorentina and Cagliari. Nagatomo showed his versatility by playing right back against Sampdoria on 27 February, and finishing the whole 90 minutes. On 6 March 2011, Nagatomo scored his first goal for Inter in the 5–2 trashing of Genoa on a Kharja assist with a swivel and a finish into the roof of the net.

On 15 March, to show solidarity with his home country in light of the catastrophic earthquake and tsunami which took place the previous week he paraded the Japanese flag (with the writing "You'll Never Walk Alone", a chant of his former team in Tokyo) around the pitch during a Champions League match against Bayern Munich. Inter had drawn German club side Schalke 04 in the quarter-finals of Champions League. Nagatomo, along with international teammate Atsuto Uchida, who played for Schalke, became the second and third Japanese footballer to play in the quarter-finals of the UEFA Champions league. (Keisuke Honda was the first, playing for CSKA Moscow during 2009–10 season).

After the Serie A season was over, Inter Milan made an agreement with Cesena of making Yūto's move permanent in a cash plus player exchange deal. Nagatomo was valued at €10.95 million, however part of the fee was paid via half of the registration rights of Luca Garritano (€700,000) and Luca Caldirola (€2.5 million).

Nagatomo started his second Inter Milan season by playing 62 minutes in the opening Serie A match against Palermo, which ended in a 4–3 away defeat. On 27 September 2011, Nagatomo provided an assist for Giampaolo Pazzini by nutmegging Aleksei Berezutski before driving the ball across goal during the 3–2 away win against CSKA Moscow in the second Champions League group stage. He scored his first goal of the season on 10 December, during the 2–0 home win against Fiorentina in 15th league matchday. He was again on the scoresheet three days later as he headed home a Ricky Álvarez cross in the 1–0 win against Genoa. In the last match of 2011 against Lecce at home, Nagatomo produced a "man of the match" performance by providing two assists in an eventual 4–1 win.

Nagatomo enjoyed his most productive season under Walter Mazzarri, scoring five goals, along with six assists during the 2013–14 season.

Nagatomo lost his place in the starting lineup in the 2014–15 season, making only 14 league appearances. He captained Inter for the first time on 28 September 2014 in the 2014–15 Serie A matchday 5 versus Cagliari, leaving the field in the 27th minute after receiving two yellow cards in 120 seconds as Inter was defeated 1–4 at San Siro. Nagatomo said that he had turned down a January 2016 offer from Premier League outfit Manchester United, stating that his intentions were to renew with Inter.

On 8 April 2016, Nagatomo agreed a contract extension with the club, signing until June 2019. During the 2016–17 season, he played 20 matches in all competitions, including 16 in league, 11 of them as starter, as Inter finished 7th in championship, was eliminated in the quarter-final of Coppa Italia by Lazio, and finished bottom in Europa League Group K.

Nagatomo improved his game at the start of 2017–18 season under new manager Luciano Spalletti, winning his place once again. His 200th official appearance for Inter occurred on 16 September 2017 in the matchday 3 match at Crotone, winning a free kick that lead to the first goal in an eventual 0–2 win. Later on 12 December, Nagatomo played 120 minutes in the 2017–18 Coppa Italia round of 16 fixture against underdogs of Pordenone. The match went to penalty shootouts where he netted the winning penalty in the 5–4 penalty shootout that led Inter Milan to the victory and progression to quarter-finals.

=== Galatasaray ===
On 31 January 2018, Nagatomo joined Turkish club Galatasaray on loan for the remainder of the 2017–18 season. On 30 June 2018 the deal was made permanent. On 20 April 2019, Nagotomo scored his first goal for the club in a league match against Kayserispor. In his time with the Galatasaray, Nagatomo won two back-to-back Süper Lig titles in 2018 and 2019, a Turkish Cup and a Turkish Super Cup in 2019

=== Marseille ===
On 31 August 2020, Nagatomo signed with Ligue 1 club Marseille on a free transfer. He made his first appearance for the club in a 1–1 league draw against Lille on 20 September 2020.

=== Return to FC Tokyo ===
Upon the expiry of his Marseille contract, on 12 September 2021, he rejoined his boyhood club, FC Tokyo. On 18 September 2021, Nagatomo made his first appearance for the club against Yokohama FC for the time since leaving for Europe 10 years ago.

== International career ==
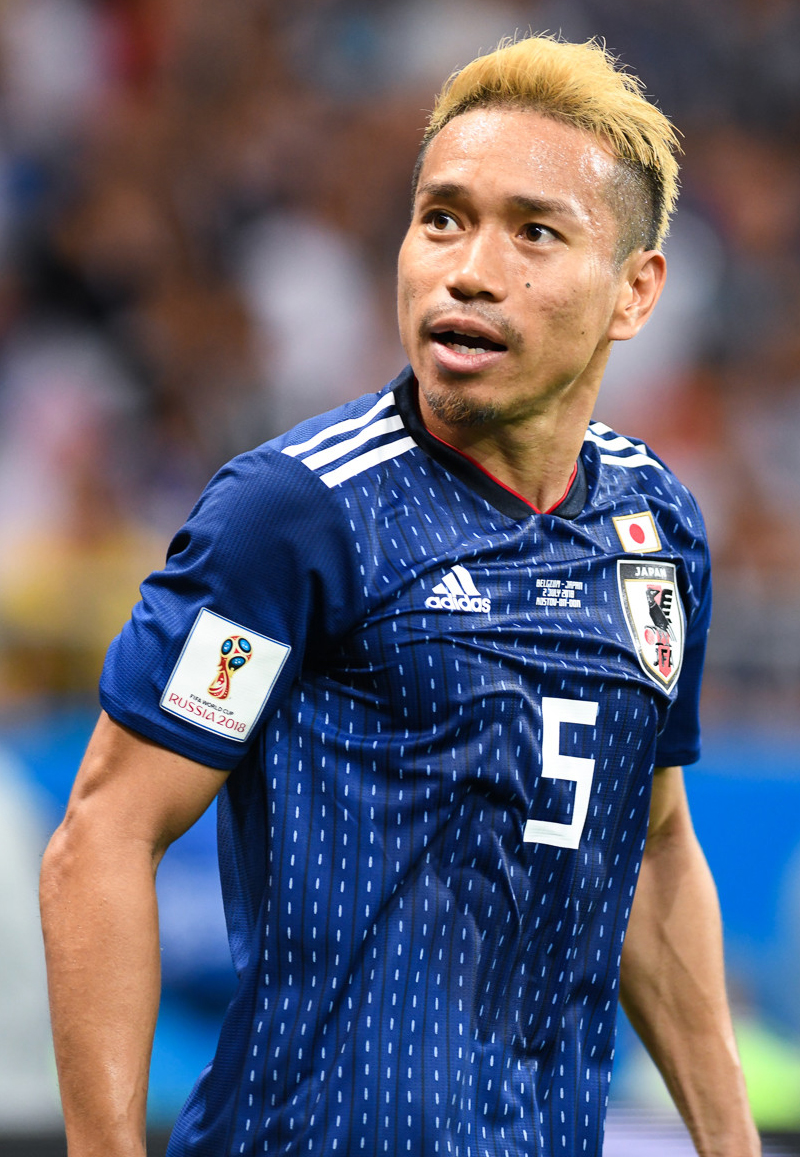
Nagatomo during the 2018 FIFA World Cup Round of 16 match between Belgium and Japan on 2 July 2018.

Nagatomo earned his first international cap for Japan on 24 May 2008 in a friendly against Ivory Coast. His first international goal was scored in a friendly against Syria held on 13 November 2008. Nagatomo was also a member of the Japan U-21 team for the 2008 Summer Olympics.

=== 2010 FIFA World Cup ===
He was called up to Japan for the 2010 FIFA World Cup, starting all three group games and the round of 16 match against Paraguay, where Japan were eliminated in penalties.

=== 2011 AFC Asian Cup ===
Nagatomo was selected as part of the Japan squad for the 2011 AFC Asian Cup by coach Alberto Zaccheroni. He featured in every game Japan played in the competition and helped them defeat Australia in the final, thus earning his first international honour.

=== 2013 FIFA Confederations Cup ===
He was included in Alberto Zaccheroni's 23-man Japan squad for the 2013 FIFA Confederations Cup where he featured in the three games before they were eliminated in the group stage.

=== 2014 FIFA World Cup ===
Nagatomo was part of Japan's national squad to play in the 2014 FIFA World Cup in Brazil. He started in all three group matches but Japan was eliminated in the group stage.

=== 2014–2018: 100th international cap ===
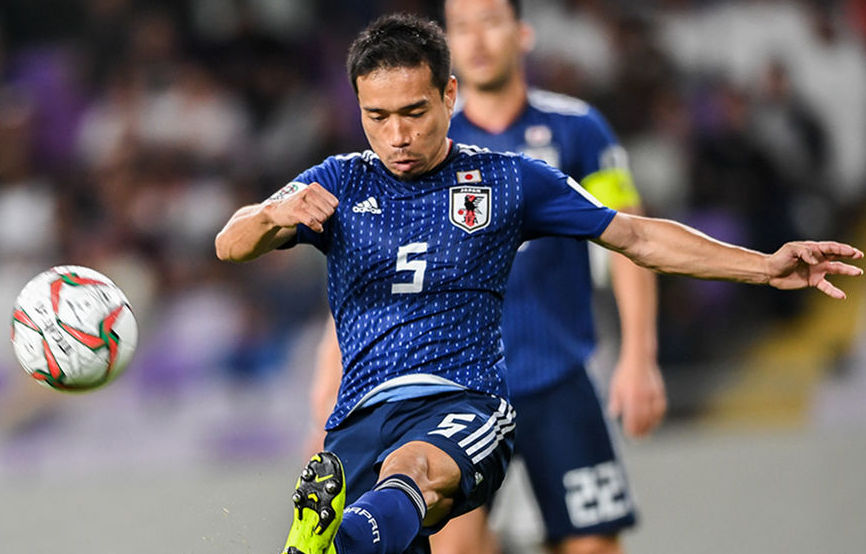
Nagatomo in action against Iran at the 2019 AFC Asian Cup

On 15 December 2014, Nagatomo was selected in Japan's squad for the 2015 AFC Asian Cup. He earned his 100th international cap on 10 November 2017, captaining Japan in a 3–1 friendly defeat to Brazil at Stade Pierre-Mauroy, Lille. He became only the seventh Japanese player to reach the milestone.

=== 2018–2022: Consecutive World Cup appearances ===
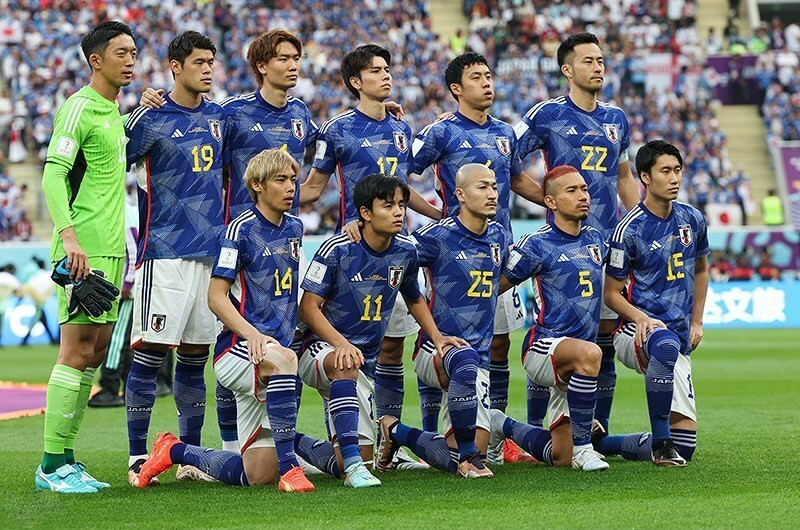
Nagatomo playing in the famous 2–1 victory against Germany in the 2022 FIFA World Cup in Qatar.

Nagatomo was subsequently named in Japan's squads for the 2018 FIFA World Cup, the 2019 AFC Asian Cup, and the 2022 FIFA World Cup.

=== 2026 FIFA World Cup ===
Nagatomo was selected for Japan's squad for the 2026 FIFA World Cup in North America. With his inclusion, he became the first Japanese player to be selected for five FIFA World Cup tournaments. He played his first match at the 2026 World Cup, appearing as a substitute in a 1–1 draw with Sweden, becoming the first Japanese player and the tenth overall to achieve this milestone.

== Personal life ==
Nagatomo is married to Japanese actress Airi Taira. The couple had maintained a long-distance relationship for several years as Taira was based in Japan. Nagatomo proposed to her on the San Siro pitch in February 2016 and they registered their marriage in January 2017. They have three sons. Both of them appeared in the Captain Tsubasa Olympics special which, aired as part of the annual Jikan Terebi Nihon no Sport wa Tsuyo in November 2019.

He pursued a degree in Political Economy at the Meiji University, where he graduated in 2007.

== Career statistics ==
=== Club ===
As of match played 10 May 2026

Appearances and goals by club, season and competition
Club	Season	League			National cup (Note: Includes Emperor's Cup, Coppa Italia, Turkish Cup and Coupe de France)		League cup (Note: Include J.League Cup)		Continental (Note: Includes UEFA Champions League and UEFA Europa League)		Other (Note: Includes Turkish Super Cup and Trophée des Champions)		Total	
Club	Season	Division	Apps	Goals	Apps	Goals	Apps	Goals	Apps	Goals	Apps	Goals	Apps	Goals
FC Tokyo	2007	J.League Division 1	0	0	—		1	0	—		—		1	0
FC Tokyo	2008	J.League Division 1	29	3	3	0	3	0	—		—		35	3
FC Tokyo	2009	J.League Division 1	31	1	1	0	4	1	—		—		36	2
FC Tokyo	2010	J.League Division 1	12	1	—		1	0	—		—		13	1
FC Tokyo	Total		72	5	4	0	9	1	0	0	0	0	85	6
Cesena (loan)	2010–11	Serie A	16	0	0	0	—		—		—		16	0
Inter Milan (loan)	2010–11	Serie A	13	2	3	0	—		3	0	—		19	2
Inter Milan	2011–12	Serie A	35	2	1	0	—		7	0	—		43	2
Inter Milan	2012–13	Serie A	25	0	2	0	—		8	2	—		35	2
Inter Milan	2013–14	Serie A	34	5	2	0	—		—		—		36	5
Inter Milan	2014–15	Serie A	14	0	1	0	—		3	0	—		18	0
Inter Milan	2015–16	Serie A	22	0	4	0	—		—		—		26	0
Inter Milan	2016–17	Serie A	16	0	0	0	—		4	0	—		20	0
Inter Milan	2017–18	Serie A	11	0	2	0	—		—		—		13	0
Inter Milan	Inter total		170	9	15	0	0	0	25	2	0	0	210	11
Galatasaray (loan)	2017–18	Süper Lig	15	0	1	0	—		—		—		16	0
Galatasaray	2018–19	Süper Lig	17	1	0	0	—		7	0	1	0	25	1
Galatasaray	2019–20	Süper Lig	15	1	2	1	—		6	0	1	0	24	2
Galatasaray	Galatasaray total		47	2	3	1	0	0	13	0	2	0	65	3
Marseille	2020–21	Ligue 1	25	0	1	0	—		2	0	1	0	29	0
FC Tokyo	2021	J1 League	10	0	—		—		—		—		10	0
FC Tokyo	2022	J1 League	30	0	1	0	—		—		—		31	0
FC Tokyo	2023	J1 League	29	0	2	0	6	0	—		—		37	0
FC Tokyo	2024	J1 League	29	2	1	0	0	0	—		—		30	2
FC Tokyo	2025	J1 League	27	0	3	0	2	0	—		—		32	0
FC Tokyo	2026	J1 League	8	0	0	0	0	0	—		—		8	0
FC Tokyo	Total		133	2	7	0	8	0	0	0	0	0	148	2
Career total			463	18	30	1	17	1	40	2	3	0	553	22

=== International ===
As of match played 26 June 2026

Appearances and goals by national team and year
National team	Year	Apps	Goals
Japan	2008	7	1
Japan	2009	11	2
Japan	2010	16	0
Japan	2011	10	0
Japan	2012	10	0
Japan	2013	12	0
Japan	2014	10	0
Japan	2015	10	0
Japan	2016	5	0
Japan	2017	10	0
Japan	2018	9	0
Japan	2019	12	1
Japan	2020	1	0
Japan	2021	8	0
Japan	2022	11	0
Japan	2023	0	0
Japan	2024	0	0
Japan	2025	2	0
Japan	2026	2	0
Total		146	4

Scores and results list Japan's goal tally first, score column indicates score after each Nagatomo goal.

List of international goals scored by Yūto Nagatomo
No.	Date	Venue	Opponent	Score	Result	Competition
1	13 November 2008	Saitama Stadium 2002, Saitama, Japan	Syria	1–0	3–1	Friendly
2	31 May 2009	National Stadium, Tokyo, Japan	Belgium	1–0	4–0	Friendly
3	8 October 2009	Outsourcing Stadium, Shizuoka, Japan	Hong Kong	2–0	6–0	2011 AFC Asian Cup qualification
4	10 October 2019	Saitama Stadium 2002, Saitama, Japan	Mongolia	3–0	6–0	2022 FIFA World Cup qualification

== Honours ==
FC Tokyo

- J.League Cup: 2009

Inter Milan

- Coppa Italia: 2010–11

Galatasaray

- Süper Lig: 2017–18, 2018–19
- Turkish Cup: 2018–19
- Turkish Super Cup: 2019

Japan

- AFC Asian Cup: 2011
- EAFF Championship: 2025

Individual

- J.League Best XI: 2009
- AFC Asian International Player of the Year: 2013
- AFC Asian Cup Team of the Tournament: 2019
- AFC Opta All-time XI at the FIFA World Cup: 2020
- AFC Fans' All-time XI at the FIFA World Cup: 2020
- AFC Asian Cup All-time XI: 2023

== See also ==
- List of footballers with 100 or more caps
