= 2011 Coppa Italia final =

63rd Coppa Italia final
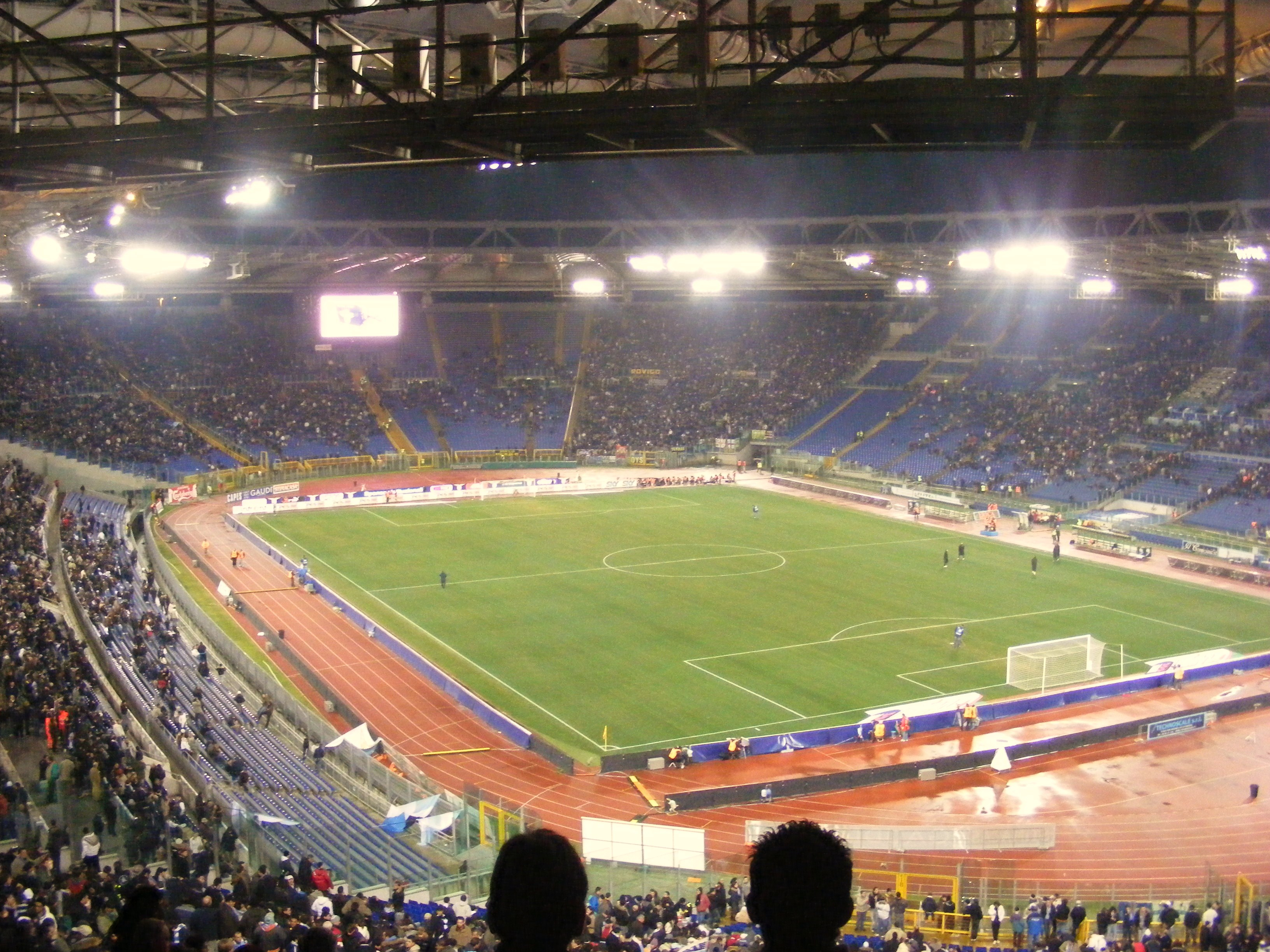
- Event: 2010–11 Coppa Italia
Internazionale	Palermo
3	1
- Date: 29 May 2011
- Venue: Stadio Olimpico, Rome
- Referee: Emidio Morganti
- Attendance: 70,000
- Weather: Clear; 20 °C (68 °F)

The 2011 Coppa Italia final was the final match of the 2010–11 Coppa Italia, the top cup competition in Italian football. The match was played at the Stadio Olimpico in Rome on 29 May 2011 between Internazionale and Palermo. Internazionale won by 3–1 to retain the trophy.

While this was the fourth year in which the final was held as a single match in neutral Rome (in place of the two-legged tie which had been used for the previous 25 years), it was the first occasion where this was the case in practice, as the other three had all involved one of the resident clubs from the capital city, Roma or Lazio.

== Road to the final ==
Internazionale		Round	Palermo
Opponent	Result	2010–11 Coppa Italia	Opponent	Result
Genoa	3–2	Round of 16	Chievo	1–0
Napoli	0–0 (5–4 pen.)	Quarterfinals	Parma	0–0 (5–4 pen.)
Roma	1–0 (A), 1–1 (H) (2–1 agg.)	Semifinals	Milan	2–2 (A), 2–1 (H) (4–3 agg.)

== Match ==
=== Details ===
29 May 2011
21:00 CEST

Internazionale	3–1	Palermo
Eto'o 26', 76'; Milito 90+2'	Report	Muñoz 88'

Stadio Olimpico, Rome
Attendance: 70,000
Referee: Emidio Morganti

Internazionale	Palermo

GK	1	(Brazil) Júlio César
RB	55	(Japan) Yuto Nagatomo
CB	6	(Brazil) Lúcio
CB	15	(Italy) Andrea Ranocchia
LB	26	(Romania) Cristian Chivu
DM	5	(Serbia) Dejan Stanković
CM	4	(Argentina) Javier Zanetti (c)
CM	8	(Italy) Thiago Motta	(substituted off) 83'
AM	10	(Netherlands) Wesley Sneijder	(substituted off) 87'
CF	7	(Italy) Giampaolo Pazzini	(substituted off) 61'
CF	9	(Cameroon) Samuel Eto'o
Substitutes:
GK	12	(Italy) Luca Castellazzi
DF	23	(Italy) Marco Materazzi
DF	25	(Argentina) Walter Samuel
MF	14	(Morocco) Houssine Kharja
MF	17	(Kenya) McDonald Mariga	(substituted in) 83'
FW	22	(Argentina) Diego Milito	(substituted in) 87'
FW	27	(North Macedonia) Goran Pandev	(substituted in) 61'
Manager:
(Brazil) Leonardo Araújo

GK	46	(Italy) Salvatore Sirigu
RB	16	(Italy) Mattia Cassani (c)
CB	6	(Argentina) Ezequiel Muñoz	(yellow card) 26' (red card) 90'
CB	3	(Romania) Dorin Goian		(substituted off) 24'
LB	42	(Italy) Federico Balzaretti
CM	8	(Italy) Giulio Migliaccio
CM	94	(Ghana) Afriyie Acquah	(yellow card) 26'	(substituted off) 55'
CM	23	(Italy) Antonio Nocerino
AM	72	(Slovenia) Josip Iličić
AM	27	(Argentina) Javier Pastore
CF	9	(Uruguay) Abel Hernández		(substituted off) 79'
Substitutes:
GK	99	(Italy) Francesco Benussi
DF	36	(Italy) Matteo Darmian
DF	80	(Italy) Moris Carrozzieri	(yellow card) 69'	(substituted in) 24'
MF	4	(Switzerland) Pajtim Kasami
MF	11	(Italy) Fabio Liverani
FW	10	(Italy) Fabrizio Miccoli		(substituted in) 55'
FW	51	(Chile) Mauricio Pinilla		(substituted in) 79'
Manager:
(Italy) Delio Rossi

Man of the Match:
Samuel Eto'o (Internazionale)

Assistant referees:
Sandro Rossomando
Stefano Papi
Fourth official:
Paolo Tagliavento

== See also ==
- 2010–11 Inter Milan season
- 2010–11 US Città di Palermo season
