= Serie A Foreign Footballer of the Year =

Italian football league award

AIC Serie A Foreign Footballer of the Year
- Sport: Association football
- Competition: Serie A
- Awarded for: Foreign player considered to have performed the best in each given Serie A season
- Local name: Migliore calciatore straniero AIC (Italian)
- Country: Italy
- Presented by: Italian Footballers' Association (AIC)

History
- First award: 1997
- Editions: 14
- Final award: 2010
- First winner: (France) Zinedine Zidane (1997)
- Most wins: (Sweden) Zlatan Ibrahimović; (Brazil) Kaká; (3 times each)
- Most recent: (Argentina) Diego Milito (2010)
- Website: Official website

The AIC Serie A Foreign Footballer of the Year (Italian: Migliore calciatore straniero AIC) was a yearly award organized by the Italian Footballers' Association (AIC) given to the non-Italian footballer who was considered to have performed the best over the previous Serie A season. Diego Milito was the last recipient of the award in 2010. The award was part of the Oscar del Calcio awards event.

== Winners ==
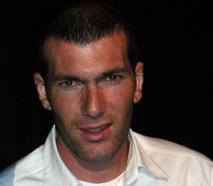
Zinedine Zidane, who won the first edition, winning it again in 2001

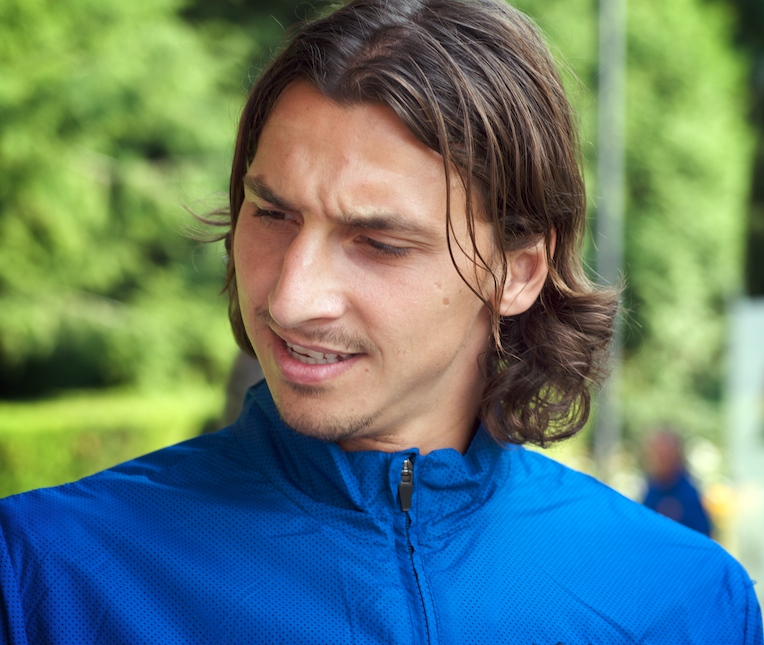
Zlatan Ibrahimović, who has won the award three times

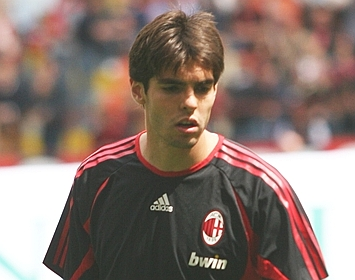
Kaká, who has won the award three times

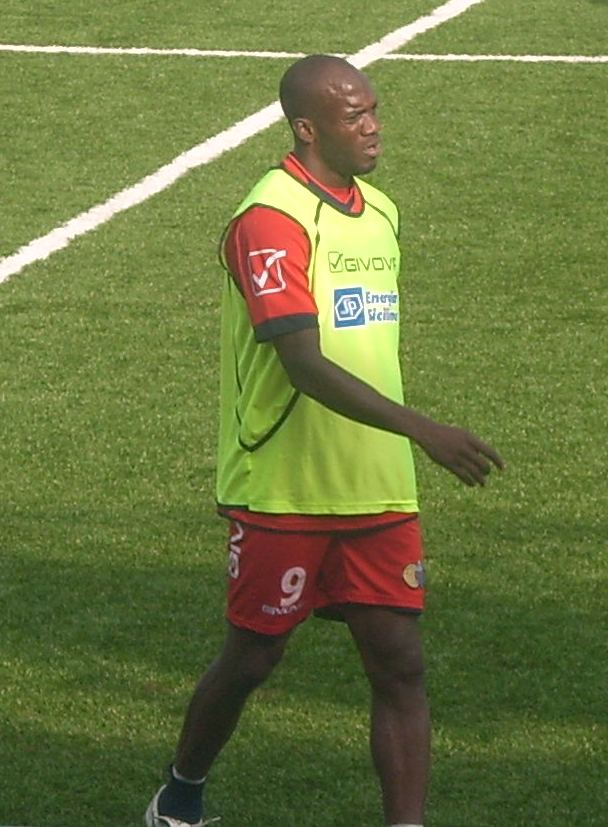
David Suazo, who shared the award in 2006

Year	Player	Club	Ref(s)
1997	(France) Zinedine Zidane	Juventus	
1998	(Brazil) Ronaldo	Internazionale	
1999	(Argentina) Gabriel Batistuta	Fiorentina	
2000	(Ukraine) Andriy Shevchenko	Milan	
2001	(France) Zinedine Zidane	Juventus	
2002	(France) David Trezeguet	Juventus	
2003	(Czech Republic) Pavel Nedvěd	Juventus	
2004	(Brazil) Kaká	Milan	
2005	(Sweden) Zlatan Ibrahimović	Juventus	
2006	(Brazil) Kaká	Milan	
2006	(Honduras) David Suazo	Cagliari	
2007	(Brazil) Kaká	Milan	
2008	(Sweden) Zlatan Ibrahimović	Internazionale	
2009	(Sweden) Zlatan Ibrahimović	Internazionale	
2010	(Argentina) Diego Milito	Internazionale	

=== By club ===
Club	Players	Total
Juventus	4	5
Internazionale	3	4
Milan	2	4
Fiorentina	1	1
Cagliari	1	1

=== By country ===
Country	Players	Total
Brazil	2	4
France	2	3
Sweden	1	3
Argentina	2	2
Czech Republic	1	1
Honduras	1	1
Ukraine	1	1

=== By position ===
Position	Players	Total
Forward	7	9
Midfielder	3	6
