= McDonald Mariga =

Kenyan footballer (born 1987)

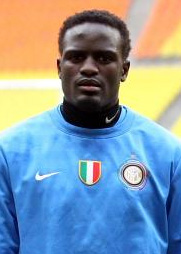
- Mariga with Inter Milan in 2010

Personal information
- Full name: McDonald Mariga Wanyama
- Date of birth: 4 April 1987 (age 39)
- Place of birth: Nairobi, Kenya
- Height: 1.88 m (6 ft 2 in)
- Position: Defensive midfielder

Youth career
- Ulinzi Stars

Senior career*
Years	Team	Apps	(Gls)
2003–2004	Tusker		
2004–2005	Kenya Pipeline		
2005–2006	Enköpings SK	1	(0)
2006–2007	Helsingborgs IF	37	(6)
2007–2010	Parma	62	(4)
2010–2014	Inter Milan	21	(1)
2011–2012	→ Real Sociedad (loan)	14	(0)
2013	→ Parma (loan)	13	(1)
2014–2015	Parma	9	(0)
2016–2017	Latina	41	(2)
2017–2018	Real Oviedo	15	(0)
2018–2019	Cuneo	0	(0)

International career
2003–2018	Kenya	40	(5)
- * Club domestic league appearances and goals

McDonald Mariga Wanyama (Kenyan English: [makˈdanald maˈriɡa waˈnjama]; born 4 April 1987) is a Kenyan politician and former professional footballer who played as a defensive midfielder. In 2010, he became the first Kenyan footballer to play in and win the UEFA Champions League for Inter Milan.

== Club career ==
=== Early career ===
Mariga started his playing career at Ulinzi Stars before moving first to Tusker and then to Kenya Pipeline while still at school. Mariga was a member of the Kamukunji High School 'Golden Boys', which also included Kenyan striker Dennis Oliech (Auxerre, France), who won two consecutive National Championships in 2002 and 2003.

The central midfielder went to Sweden in 2005 to play for third Division side Enköpings SK. After only one season at ESK, he signed for Helsingborgs IF before the 2006 season. His success at Helsingborgs was immediate. Following initial interest from Portsmouth manager Harry Redknapp, Mariga looked set to sign for the Premier League team, but work permit issues held up the deal which was supposed to have cost around €2.7 million.

=== Parma ===
He moved to the Serie A club Parma initially on loan in August 2007. The Italian club had an option to buy him in the summer for a fee of 20 million Swedish kronor (around €2 million). Mariga agreed to a four-year deal to keep him at Serie A side Parma for four years until the end of June 2012, after the club paid a transfer fee of Swedish Kronor 18 million (approx. 1.94 million euro). The deal, brokered by former Swedish great Martin Dahlin, now an agent, falls short of the 20 Million Kronor asking price initially set by Helsingborgs. 25% of the transfer fee will go to Enkopings SK, the club that first got Mariga to Sweden in 2005. Mariga played 35 times for Parma in the Serie B during the 2008–09 season scoring three times to help them back to Serie A for the 2009–10 season.

In January 2010, he was set to sign for English club Manchester City of the Premier League, but he failed to obtain a work permit. It was later stated by Kenya's Prime Minister Raila Odinga that 22-year-old Mariga had eventually obtained a UK work permit but only after the transfer window for the Premier League had closed. Had Mariga successfully signed for Manchester City, he would have become the first East African player to sign for a Premier League club, a milestone later achieved by his brother Victor Wanyama upon his transfer to Southampton in July 2013.

=== Inter Milan ===
On 1 February 2010, the last day of the transfer window, Mariga moved to Inter Milan in a co-ownership deal. The transfer fee was €5 million in a cash plus player deal which Parma got half the registration rights of Jonathan Biabiany (€2.5 million) and the loan of Luis Antonio Jiménez. Following the move, Inter chairman Massimo Moratti hailed Mariga's move as the "best thing that could have happened" to the club in the January transfer window. He made his debut for Inter Milan in the first leg of the 2009-10 Coppa Italia Semi-final against Fiorentina. Inter narrowly won the match 1–0. In March 2010, Mariga became the first Kenyan to play in the UEFA Champions League, when he entered the field as a late substitute against Chelsea.

Mariga thought he scored his first goal for Inter on 24 April 2010 against Atalanta when he netted Samuel Eto'o's back pass into the roof of the net. However, his shot deflected off Sulley Muntari and the goal was credited instead to the Ghanaian. He also scored a thrashing header against Genoa for the Nerazzurri in a game that ended 3–2.

On 17 June 2010, Inter bought him outright and bought back Biabiany for €4.2 million each, which made Parma registered a "loss from co-ownership" of €800,000, as the retained profit of unsold half had decreased from €5 million to €4.2 million. However, if counting the profit from Biabiany, which Inter in fact paid Parma €10.9 million cash for Mariga plus the special loan of Biabiany. While Luis Antonio Jiménez originally included in the deal but collapsed after Inter lost its portion on 25 June.

At the start of the 2011–12 season, Mariga was loaned out to La Liga club Real Sociedad. It meant that Inter had a non-EU transfer quota which they used on winter signing Juan and Fredy Guarín (the other quota was obtained from Philippe Coutinho). After half a season back at Inter, he was loaned to Parma in the January 2013 transfer window and he scored his only goal against Lazio. In the next fixture, he was injured against Novara, which ruled him out for the rest of the season. He returned to Inter along with Biabiany at the end of the season at the request of manager Andrea Stramaccioni, but was released by the club in May 2014.

=== Return to Parma ===
On 4 September 2014, Mariga re-signed with Parma, the team he left to join Inter in 2010.

=== Latina ===
In January 2016, he was signed by Serie B club Latina.

=== Oviedo ===
On 31 July 2017, Mariga signed a one-year deal with Spanish Segunda División club Real Oviedo.

== International career ==
McDonald Mariga made his debut for the senior national team of Kenya national football team in 2003. Over the span of roughly fifteen year until 2018, he remained a part of the national team. He scored his first international goal on 25 March 2007, in a match against Eswatini national football team (then Swaziland). At the end of his international career, Mariga had earned 40 caps and scored five goals for Kenya. As a defensive midfielder, his role was not primarily goal-scoring, but rather, he contributed in midfield through defensive duties, ball recovery, distribution, and providing experience and composure to the national side, especially given his exposure in top European leagues. During his time with the Kenyan team, Mariga's presence on the pitch was significant, as he combined international experience with technical ability and physical presence — qualities that helped stabilize Kenya's midfield in many matches and qualifying campaigns.

== Personal life ==
Mariga's father, Noah Wanyama, a left-winger, played for A.F.C. Leopards and the Kenya national football team. His younger brother Victor Wanyama was also a professional football player, while his other brothers Thomas and Sylvester are also footballers in the Kenyan Premier League. Their younger sister Mercy was the captain of the Lang'ata High School basketball team, and previously played football and netball.

In 2013, Mariga ended his engagement to his long-time Rwandese fiancée Ariane Umutoni, after relations between the couple reportedly deteriorated.

== Political ambitions ==
In September 2019, Mariga made a debut in Kenya's politics after announcing plans to contest for a parliamentary seat in a by-election in one of the constituencies (Kibra). He was nominated by the Jubilee Party as its flag bearer in the Kibra by-election. The by-election was occasioned by the death of former MP Ken Okoth, who died on 26 July 2019, after a long battle with colon cancer.

The Kenyan electoral commission IEBC; has however, not cleared Mariga to participate in the election. Although Mariga had applied to be registered as a voter on 26 August 2019 in Starehe constituency, the IEBC insisted that his name was not in its register. Mariga appealed the decision, but the matter is yet to be concluded. If he qualifies, he will face off with Bernard Okoth of ODM and several other contestants.

== Career statistics ==
=== International ===
Scores and results list Kenya's goal tally first.

No	Date	Venue	Opponent	Score	Result	Competition
1.	25 March 2007	Moi International Sports Centre, Nairobi, Kenya	Swaziland	1–0	2–0	2008 Africa Cup of Nations qualification
2.	14 June 2008	Nyayo National Stadium, Nairobi, Kenya	Zimbabwe	1–0	2–0	2010 FIFA World Cup qualification
3.	20 June 2009	Moi International Sports Centre, Nairobi, Kenya	Mozambique	2–1	2–1	2010 FIFA World Cup qualification
4.	11 August 2010	National Stadium, Dar es Salaam, Tanzania	Tanzania	1–0	1–1	Friendly
5.	26 March 2011	Nyayo National Stadium, Nairobi, Kenya	Angola	2–1	2–1	2012 Africa Cup of Nations qualification

== Honours ==
Helsingborgs IF

- Svenska Cupen: 2006

Inter Milan

- Serie A: 2009–10
- Coppa Italia: 2009–10, 2010–11
- Supercoppa Italiana: 2010
- UEFA Champions League: 2009–10
- FIFA Club World Cup: 2010
