= Houssine Kharja =

Moroccan footballer (born 1982)

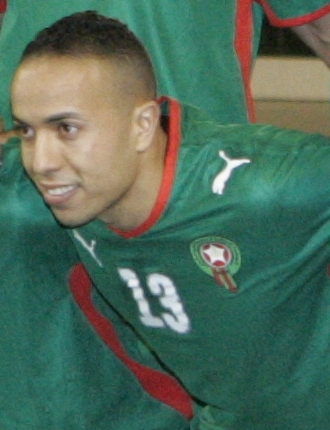
- Kharja with Morocco in 2009

Personal information
- Date of birth: 9 November 1982 (age 44)
- Place of birth: Poissy, France
- Height: 1.80 m (5 ft 11 in)
- Position: Attacking midfielder

Youth career
- 1993–1998: Paris Saint-Germain
- 1998–2000: Gazélec Ajaccio

Senior career*
Years	Team	Apps	(Gls)
2000–2001	Sporting CP B	28	(4)
2001–2007	Ternana	119	(10)
2005–2006	→ Roma (loan)	12	(1)
2007–2008	Piacenza	17	(2)
2008	→ Siena (loan)	15	(3)
2008–2009	Siena	36	(5)
2009–2011	Genoa	20	(3)
2011	→ Internazionale (loan)	15	(1)
2011–2012	Fiorentina	19	(0)
2012–2013	Al-Arabi	19	(2)
2014–2015	Sochaux	22	(1)
2015–2016	FCSB	6	(0)
Total		328	(32)

International career
2003–2015	Morocco	79	(13)
- * Club domestic league appearances and goals

Houssine Kharja (Berber languages: ⵀⵓⵙⵙⵉⵏ ⵀⴰⵔⵣⴰ, Arabic: حسين خرجة; born 9 November 1982) is a Moroccan former professional footballer who played as an attacking midfielder.

Born in France, he spent most of his career in Italy after starting out on his senior career at Sporting CP. In the Serie A he played for a number of clubs, including A.S. Roma, Internazionale and Fiorentina, making a total of 117 appearances and scoring 13 goals.

At international level, he represented the Morocco national team earning 78 caps and scoring 13 goals between 2003 and 2015.

== Club career ==
=== Youth ===
Kharja began his career with Paris Saint-Germain's youth side and in 1998 he joined Gazélec Ajaccio.

=== Portugal ===
In 2000 he joined the Portuguese side Sporting CP.

=== Italy ===
After only one season at Sporting, he joined Ternana in 2001. He played four impressive Serie B seasons for the Rossoverdi, gaining a place in the Moroccan national team, and being loaned to Roma in 2005, with the option to buy him in a co-ownership deal for €3.6 million. Kharja played 12 matches and scored one goal during a 1–1 draw against Juventus.

At the end of the 2005–06 season, Roma decided not to extend Kharja's loan, so the Moroccan player had to return to Ternana, but he refused to go back and play because in the meantime the Rossoverdi had been relegated to Serie C1. Ternana considered him as their own player, and Lega Calcio Serie C even suspended him until 26 April 2007. After appeals, FIGC's court decided that Kharja was a free agent, and so, on 20 March 2007 he signed a three-year contract with Serie B team Piacenza. In January 2008, he was loaned to Siena for the second half of the season, with this deal being turned a permanent one on 11 July.

In June 2009, Genoa announced the club was reaching an agreement to sign the player and on 2 July the transfer from Siena was completed. Genoa got Kharja for €6.5 million, while Siena signed the remain 50% registration rights of Manuel Coppola for €1.5 million and the full rights of Gianluca Pegolo for €1 million.

It was announced on 29 January 2011, that Kharja had joined Internazionale on a loan deal with the option of Inter signing him permanently. He scored his first goal for Internazionale during his second appearance for the club against Bari on 3 February 2011. At the end of his loan spell, Inter decided not to give the player a permanent deal, and so he returned to Genoa.

On 18 August 2011, Fiorentina signed the player on a co-ownership deal, signing a two-year deal.

=== Qatar ===
On 29 June 2012, Kharja signed a two-year deal with Qatari club Al-Arabi.

He was involved in an altercation with Al Gharafa player Nenê on 19 March 2013 in a Qatari Stars Cup match. After Kharja persistently fouled Nenê for the majority of the match, Nenê was sent off in an unrelated incident after a challenge on one of Kharja's teammates. When Nenê attempted to protest the referee's decision, Kharja shoulder-blocked him, preventing him from reaching the referee. Nenê responded by elbowing Kharja in the back of the head. After a delayed reaction, Kharja attacked Nenê, who was then being restrained by teammates. This induced a brawl between the two teams.

Harsh sanctions followed after the match, with four players being fined and banned from match play as well as a member of Al Arabi's staff being fined and warned. Kharja received the harshest penalty, being fined QR 380,000 and receiving a ten-game ban, the largest penalty in the history of the Qatar Stars League. Later, on 31 March, after a 4–1 defeat to Lekhwiya in the league, Al Arabi terminated his contract as a result of the aftermath of the brawl. He later stated that he had not received notification that his contract had been terminated.

=== France ===
On 10 October 2014, Sochaux announced that Kharja had joined on a one-year contract after playing 16 years away from his native France.

=== Romania ===
In September 2015, Kharja joined Romanian defending champions Steaua București on a one-year deal. He made his Liga I debut in the 3–1 win against Concordia Chiajna, three days after signing the contract.

== Career statistics ==
=== Club ===
Appearances and goals by club, season and competition
Club	Season	League			National cup		League cup		Europe		Other		Total	
Club	Season	Division	Apps	Goals	Apps	Goals	Apps	Goals	Apps	Goals	Apps	Goals	Apps	Goals
Sporting CP B	2000–01	Segunda Divisão B	28	4	—		—		—		—		28	4
Ternana	2001–02	Serie B	23	2	0	0	—		—		—		23	2
Ternana	2002–03	Serie B	28	2	1	0	—		—		—		29	2
Ternana	2003–04	Serie B	35	3	0	0	—		—		—		35	3
Ternana	2004–05	Serie B	33	3	2	0	—		—		—		35	3
Ternana	2006–07	Serie B	0	0	0	0	—		—		—		0	0
Ternana	Total		119	10	3	0	0	0	0	0	0	0	122	10
Roma (loan)	2005–06	Serie A	12	1	5	0	—		8	0	—		25	1
Piacenza	2007–08	Serie B	17	2	0	0	—		—		—		17	2
Siena	2007–08 (loan)	Serie A	15	3	0	0	—		—		—		15	3
Siena	2008–09	Serie A	36	5	2	1	—		—		—		38	6
Siena	Total		51	8	2	1	0	0	0	0	0	0	53	9
Genoa	2009–10	Serie A	7	3	0	0	—		4	1	—		11	4
Genoa	2010–11	Serie A	13	0	2	1	—		—		—		15	1
Genoa	Total		20	3	2	1	0	0	4	1	0	0	26	5
Internazionale (loan)	2010–11	Serie A	15	1	1	0	—		3	0	—		19	1
Fiorentina	2011–12	Serie A	19	0	2	0	—		3	0	—		21	0
Al-Arabi	2012–13	Qatar Stars League	19	2	0	0	—		—		—		19	2
Sochaux	2014–15	Ligue 2	22	1	1	0	—		—		—		23	1
Steaua București	2015–16	Liga I	6	0	1	0	2	0	—		2	0	11	0
Career total			328	32	17	2	2	0	15	1	2	0	364	35

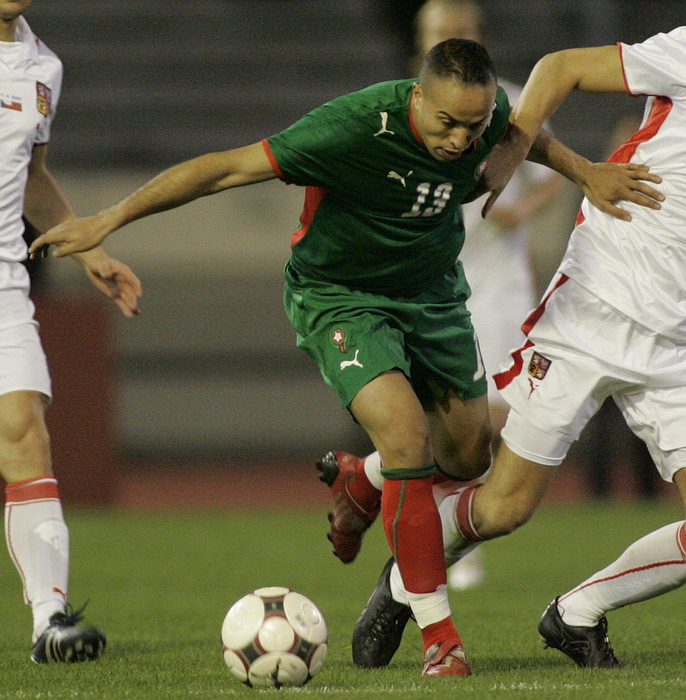
Kharja with Morocco in their friendly against Czech Republic on 11 February 2009.

=== International ===
Scores and results list Morocco's goal tally first, score column indicates score after each Kharja goal.

List of international goals scored by Houssine Kharja
No.	Date	Venue	Opponent	Score	Result	Competition
1	4 June 2005	Stade Moulay Abdellah, Rabat, Morocco	Malawi	3–1	4–1	2006 FIFA World Cup qualification
2	31 May 2008	Stade Mohamed V, Casablanca, Morocco	Ethiopia	3–0	3–0	2010 FIFA World Cup qualification
3	7 June 2008	Stade Nacional, Nouakchott, Mauritania	Mauritania	4–0	4–1	2010 FIFA World Cup qualification
4	20 August 2008	Stade Moulay Abdellah, Rabat, Morocco	Benin	1–0	3–1	Friendly
5	19 November 2008	Stade Moulay Abdellah, Rabat, Morocco	Zambia	1–0	3–0	Friendly
6	10 August 2011	Stade Leopold Senghor, Dakar, Senegal	Senegal	1–0	2–0	Friendly
7	23 January 2012	Stade d'Angondjé, Libreville, Gabon	Tunisia	1–2	1–2	2012 Africa Cup of Nations
8	27 January 2012	Stade d'Angondjé, Libreville, Gabon	Gabon	1–0	2–3	2012 Africa Cup of Nations
9	27 January 2012	Stade d'Angondjé, Libreville, Gabon	Gabon	2–2	2–3	2012 Africa Cup of Nations
10	2 June 2012	Independence Stadium, Bakau, Gambia	Gambia	1–1	1–1	2014 FIFA World Cup qualification
11	9 June 2012	Stade de Marrakech, Marrakesh, Morocco	Ivory Coast	1–1	2–2	2014 FIFA World Cup qualification
12	13 October 2012	Stade de Marrakech, Marrakesh, Morocco	Mozambique	2–0	4–0	2013 Africa Cup of Nations qualification

== Honours ==
Inter Milan

- Coppa Italia: 2010–11

Steaua București

- League Cup: 2015–16

Morocco

- Africa Cup of Nations runner-up: 2004

Individual

- Africa Cup of Nations Top-scorer: 2012
