= 2012–13 Inter Milan season =

Internazionale
2012–13 season
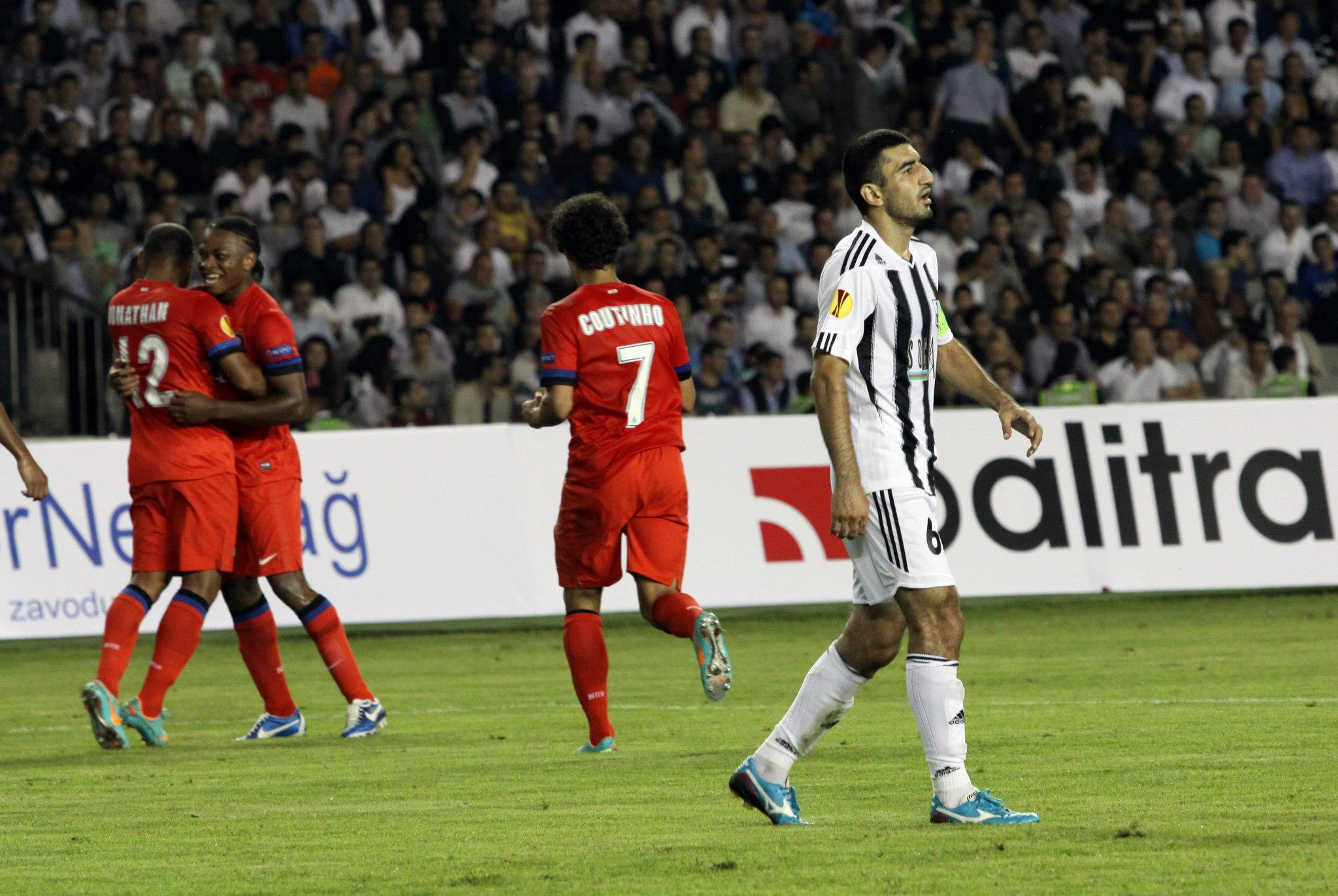
- Inter Milan players celebrating a goal against Neftchi Baku, 4 October 2012
- President: Massimo Moratti
- Manager: Andrea Stramaccioni
- Stadium: San Siro
- Serie A: 9th
- Coppa Italia: Semi-finals
- UEFA Europa League: Round of 16
- Top goalscorer: League: Rodrigo Palacio (12); All: Rodrigo Palacio (22)
- Highest home attendance: 79,341 vs Milan (24 February 2013); 79,341 vs Juventus (30 March 2013)
- Lowest home attendance: 6,150 vs Neftchi Baku (3 December 2012)
- Average home league attendance: 46,996
Home colours	Away colours	Third colours

The 2012–13 season was Football Club Internazionale Milano's 104th in existence and 97th consecutive season in the top flight of Italian football.

== Season overview ==
Inter were confined in the market to only a few purchases, as they were not yet ready for a deeper revolution: the most notable arrival being Rodrigo Palacio, from Genoa. For the first three months of 2012–13 season Inter achieved good results, especially in away games. However, during winter times, the side suffered from too many absences: Diego Milito and Javier Zanetti - for example - had long-term injuries. As a result, Inter had to use young players who did not have the required experience and skills. It was Inter's worst season since 1993–94, finishing ninth in the league and missing out on European football. On 24 May 2013, Stramaccioni was sacked by the club, with successful former Napoli coach Walter Mazzarri taking over the next day.

== Month-by-month account ==
=== June ===
On 6 June, Goran Pandev, who was on loan with Napoli on the previous season, signed a permanent contract with them for a fee of €8 million, lasting until 2015. One day later, Palacio's transfer become official when he signed a three-year contract worth €2.7 million per season.

Later on 29 June, Inter announced that Lúcio would be leaving Inter after it was agreed to cancel the final two years of his contract by mutual consent.

=== July ===
After a failed first season in Milan, Diego Forlán agreed to terminate the final year of his contract on 5 July. One day later, the club signed Matías Silvestre on loan from Palermo with an option to make the move permanent for €6 million.

On 9 May, Inter announced with signing of Slovenian goalkeeper Samir Handanović reported €11 million cash on a co-ownership deal, as well as co-ownership of Davide Faraoni. On 12 July, the team played its first friendly of the new season by easily achieving a 6–0 win against Trentino Team. Three days later, they won the second one, defeating Koper 2–0.

On 20 July, Inter announced that they had signed Gaby Mudingayi from Bologna on loan with an option to purchase for €750,000. A day later, Inter won its first pre-season trophy, the TIM Trophy, by beating Juventus and Milan to claim their eighth success. On 24 July, Inter continued with their winning streak in friendlies by defeating Como 3–2 at Stadio Giuseppe Sinigaglia.

On 28 July, Luc Castaignos was sold to Twente for €6 million. The same day, Inter draw 1–1 with Celtic at Celtic Park, as their winning streak came to an end.

=== August ===
Inter played its first competitive match on 2 August by comfortably winning 0–3 at Hajduk Split for the first leg of 2012–13 UEFA Europa League third qualifying round. In the returning leg one week later, Hajduk Split caused an upset by winning 0–2 at San Siro but nevertheless Inter progressed 3–2 on agreegate.

On 18 August, Inter played their first friendly ahead of the new season by defeating CA Bizertin 3–0 at Locarno. Three days later, Inter and Milan reached an agreement over an exchange deal involving Giampaolo Pazzini and Antonio Cassano, with a compensatory sum of €7.5 million in favor of the Nerazzurri.

In play-off round, Inter faced Vaslui. On 23 August in the first leg, Inter achieved a comfortable 0–2 away win thanks to the goals of Cambiasso and Palacio. This was also the last match of Maicon in an Inter shirt. The same day, Álvaro Pereira accepted a transfer to Inter from Porto for total fee of €10 million by signing a contract until June 2016.

Inter kicked off 2012–13 Serie A with a perfect 0–3 away win at newly promoted Pescara with Sneijder, Milito and Coutinho scoring the goals. On 30 August, Inter officially qualified in the UEFA Europa League group stage after a 2–2 home draw in the returning leg in San Siro. On the last day of the month, the Treble heroes Júlio César and Maicon were respectively sold to Queens Park Rangers and Manchester City.

=== September ===
Inter started September with a 1–3 home defeat to Roma with Cassano scoring his first Inter goal. The team bounced back by winning the third matchday 0–2 away at Torino. Cassano and Milito were the goalscorers.

On 20 September, Inter played its first match in Europa League group stage, equating 2–2 to Rubin Kazan with goals from Marko Livaja and Yuto Nagatomo. Back to Serie A three days later, Inter slumped into a 0–2 home defeat to Siena.

With goals from Pereira and Cassano, Inter achieved an important victory against Chievo in the matchday 5. In the last match of September, Inter defeated Fiorentina through Milito and Cassano goals at the first half, recording first home win in all competitions after five games without a win.

=== October ===
On 4 October, in the second game of Europa League group stage, Inter won 3–1 at Neftçi Baku with goals of Coutinho, Obi and Livaja. In the first Derby della Madonnina of the season, on 7 October, Samuel's early goal were enough to clinch the points for Inter despite playing with 10-man for about 40 minutes.

Inter continued their fine form by winning 2–0 home versus Catania, with Palacio and Cassano scoring, and also beating FK Partizan thanks to the winner of Palacio in Europa League group stage matchday 3.

In the ninth round of league, on 28 October, Inter played Bologna away. Ranocchia, Cambiasso and Milito were all in the scoresheet for the team, with the latter scoring his 100th Serie A goal, as Inter recorded their 5th consecutive league win. Inter continued their solid appearances in Serie A by extending their win record up to six matches after a 3–2 home win over Sampdoria.

=== November ===
Inter started November by ending Juventus' 49-game unbeaten run with a 3–1 victory at Juventus Stadium. Diego Milito scored a brace before Palacio sealed the win with a late goal. Matchday 4 for Inter in the Europa League against FK Partizan ended in a 1–3 away win, which ensued Inter progression to knockout phase.

On 11 November, after seven consecutive league wins, Inter was defeated 3–2 away by Atalanta which also ended Inter's longest winning away record (10). Palacio and Guarín scored the goals. One week later, Inter were stopped 2–2 by Cagliari at home, despite taking an early lead with a Palacio goal. A young Inter side were defeated 3–0 away by Rubin Kazan in Europa League matchday 5. Back in Serie A, Inter was defeated again, this time by Parma, slipping to 3rd position in the process.

=== December ===
In its first match of December, Inter won 1–0 at home against Palermo thanks to a Santiago García owngoal. On 6 December, in the final matchday of Europa League group stage, Inter drew 2–2 Neftchi Baku at home thanks to the brace from Marko Livaja, which secured them the second position in Group H and progression to the knockout phase. Three days later, Inter won its second consecutive match by beating title contenders Napoli 2–1 at San Siro. Fredy Guarín and Diego Milito scored the goals.

A goal from Lazio's Miroslav Klose in the last minutes were enough to beat Inter in Serie A matchday 17 on 15 December. To begin its Coppa Italia campaign, Inter played in the round of 16 Hellas Verona of Serie B. The match finished in a 2–0 home win thanks to the strikes of Antonio Cassano and Guarín. This match was also notable for Rodrigo Palacio efforts. He played as a goalkeeper for the final 15 minutes due to an injury of Luca Castellazzi, keeping a clean sheet and also making two saves.

Back in Serie A, Inter didn't go more than a 1–1 draw with Genoa at home, with Cambiasso scoring the only goal. Livaja missed a clear chance, shooting the post of an open goal.

=== January ===
On 4 January 2013, the fourth day of the winter transfer window, Inter announced an agreement with Lazio for the transfer of Italian striker Tommaso Rocchi. The transfer fee was €250,000 and the player signed a contract until the end of the season. The new year for the team began with a 3–0 devastating defeat to Udinese; Inter finished the match with 10 players.

Again in Serie A on 13 January, Inter returned to winning ways after three consecutive league defeats by clinching a 2–0 home win over Pescara. Fredy Guarín and Rodrigo Palacio scored the goals and also the youngster Marco Benassi made his league debut. Back in Coppa Italia for the quarter-finals, Inter achieved a hard-fought 3–2 victory over Bologna after an Andrea Ranocchia goal in the last minute of extra time.

On 20 January 2013, Wesley Sneijder was sold on controversial fashion to Galatasaray for €7.5 million. On the same day, Inter didn't go more than a 1–1 away draw against Roma with Palacio canceling Totti's penalty. Against the same opponent three days later, now for the first leg of Coppa Italia semi-final, Inter was defeated 2–1 with Palacio again scoring against capital club. One day later, Alfred Duncan was loaned to Livorno.

On 26 January, the young talent Philippe Coutinho was sold to Premier League club Liverpool for €10 million. The transfer was made official on 30 January. On 27 January, Inter were held by Torino who earned a 2–2 draw at San Siro. Chivu and Cambiasso scored Inter's goals.

On 30 January, McDonald Mariga was sent on loan at fellow Serie A club Parma. Also, Marko Livaja was transferred to Atalanta as part of Ezequiel Schelotto's transfer at Inter. One day later, the final day of the January transfer window period, Juan Pablo Carrizo was signed from Lazio for €250,000. Hot prospect Mateo Kovačić was signed for €11 million plus bonuses from Dinamo Zagreb. Also Zdravko Kuzmanović joined the team from VfB Stuttgart for an undisclosed fee.

=== February ===
Inter begun the month with a 3–1 away defeat to Siena. Cassano scored his team's only goal. On 10 February, goals from Cassano, Ranocchia and Milito ensured Inter three points against Chievo, their first after four three matches. Four days later, in first round of the round of 32 in Europa League, Inter achieved a comfortable 2–0 home win over CFR Cluj with a brace from Palacio. Striker Diego Milito was injured in the seventh minute with a collateral ligament injury, anterior cruciate ligament, and capsule in his left knee. Two days later, Milito announced that the surgery to repair the injury was a success, but the player will not return to the pitch for at least six months, ruling him out of contention for the remainder of the season.

On 17 February, Inter fell away to Fiorentina 4–1 in the Serie A matchday 25, with Cassano scoring the Inter goal. In the second leg of the round of 32 in Europa League, Inter easily won 3–0 at Stadionul Dr. Constantin Rădulescu with a brace from Guarín and a goal from Benassi, progressing to round of 16 with the aggregate 5–0.

On 24 February, in the second Derby della Madonnina, Stephan El Shaarawy gave Milan the lead in the first half, only for Ezequiel Schelotto to later equalize, salvaged a 1–1 draw for Inter.

=== March ===
On 3 March, Inter achieved a hard-fought victory against Catania at Stadio Angelo Massimino. The team was two goals down at half-time, but a goal from Ricky Álvarez and a brace from substitute Palacio, including one in the last minute, ensured three points for the Nerazzurri.

Four days later, Inter suffered a 3–0 loss at the hands of Tottenham Hotspur in the first leg of Europa League round of 16. The team continued with their unstable from by falling to Bologna 1–0 at home.

On 14 March, in the returning leg at San Siro, Inter sent the match to extra-time by winning 3–0 at regular time with the goals of Cassano, Palacio and an owngoal from William Gallas. At extra-time, Tottenham got one back with a goal from Emmanuel Adebayor, only for Inter to strike back with a header from Álvarez, winning the match 4–1, which was not enough as the team was knocked-out due to away goal rule.

The next Serie A match between Sampdoria and Inter was postponed on 2 April due to bad weather.

=== April ===
Inter started the month by winning the postponed match against Sampdoria 0–2 with both goals scored by Palacio, the second in the last moments after an individual effort. Palacio strained his left hamstring, ultimately ending his season prematurely. Four days later, the brace of Álvarez and the goal of Rocchi were not enough as Inter suffered a shock 3–4 home loss to Atalanta. Striker Cassano suffered a hamstring injury that kept him sidelined for a month, thus ending his season.

In the next matchday away against Cagliari, Inter suffered another defeat, this time 2–0 with both goals coming for the substitute Mauricio Pinilla. Yuto Nagatomo came in the second half and played only eight minutes after suffering e knee injury which ended his season. Also the midfielder Walter Gargano ended the season due to a thigh injury. This loss descended the team to the 7th position. Manager Andrea Stramaccioni dubbed the season as "cursed".

In the returning leg of Coppa Italia semi-final versus Roma, Inter initially took the lead through a Jonathan goal, but Roma fired back with a brace from Destro and a goal from Vasilis Torosidis, before Inter scoring another one with Álvarez. The match finished 2–3 for Roma and Inter was eliminated with the aggregate 5–3.

On 21 April, back in Serie A, Inter won against Parma with a late goal from Rocchi. The month ended with a 1–0 away defeat to Palermo. The legendary captain Javier Zanetti suffered an achilles tendon injury that kept him sidelined for the next six months.

=== May ===
The last month of the season begun on with a 3–1 away defeat to Napoli. Álvarez scored the temporary equalizer in the 23rd minute with a penalty kick before Cavani scored another two goals to conclude the match. In the next matchday, Inter suffered another 3–1 defeat, this time at home at the hands of Lazio with Álvarez again scoring his team's only goal.

On 12 May, Inter didn't go more than a goalless draw at Genoa in the matchday 37. Youngster Lukas Spendlhofer made his senior debut by playing in the last 13 minutes. The final match of the season ended with a 2–5 humiliating defeat to Udinese. Juan Jesus scored his first goal for Inter, while Rocchi scored another one in his final Inter match, assisted by the returning Palacio.

Inter finished the season in the 9th position in league, remaining out of European football for the first time since 1999–2000. This was also Inter's worst finish in Serie A since 1993–94. On 24 May, five days after the end of the season, head coach Andrea Stramaccioni was fired and replaced by Walter Mazzarri.

== Kit ==
Home	Home Alt.	Away	Third	Third Alt.

=== Kit information ===
Nike continued its supply of the Inter Milan kit, a relationship dating back to the 1998–99 season. Pirelli was the current sponsor, dating back to the 1995–96 season.

- Home: All-new Inter Milan's home shirt would remain the black-blue traditional stripes but the stripes are slightly wider than previous season. The sleeves of Inter Milan's home shirt was solid black instead of black-blue traditional stripes. The shorts and socks remained black colour.
- Home alternate: Same as home but including white alternate shorts.
- Away: The away kit was featured a controversially red which was the color of Inter Milan's city arch-rivals A.C. Milan with black-blue stripes in the sleeve-cuffs. The shorts and socks were also red.
- Third: Previous season's white shirt with black-blue sash across and also white shorts and white socks confirmed as third kit.
- Third alternate: Same as third kit but featured black shorts.

== Players ==
=== Squad information ===
Squad no.	Name	Nationality	Position	Date of birth (age)
Goalkeepers
1	Samir Handanović	(Slovenia)	GK	14 July 1984 (aged 28)
12	Luca Castellazzi	(Italy)	GK	19 July 1975 (aged 37)
27	Vid Belec	(Slovenia)	GK	6 June 1990 (aged 23)
77	Raffaele Di Gennaro	(Italy)	GK	3 October 1993 (aged 19)
Defenders
4	Javier Zanetti (C)	(Argentina)	RB / CM / RM	10 August 1973 (aged 39)
6	Matías Silvestre	(Argentina)	CB	25 September 1984 (aged 28)
23	Andrea Ranocchia	(Italy)	CB	16 February 1988 (aged 25)
25	Walter Samuel	(Argentina)	CB	23 March 1978 (aged 35)
26	Cristian Chivu	(Romania)	LB / CB / DM	26 October 1980 (aged 32)
31	Álvaro Pereira	(Uruguay)	LB / LM	28 November 1985 (aged 27)
33	Ibrahima Mbaye	(Senegal)	RB / RM / LB	19 November 1994 (aged 18)
40	Juan Jesus	(Brazil)	CB / LB	10 June 1991 (aged 22)
42	Jonathan	(Brazil)	RB / RM	27 February 1986 (aged 27)
55	Yuto Nagatomo	(Japan)	LB / RB / LM	12 September 1986 (aged 26)
Midfielders
5	Dejan Stanković	(Serbia)	CM / AM / RM	11 September 1978 (aged 34)
7	Ezequiel Schelotto	(Italy)	RM / RB / RW	23 May 1989 (aged 24)
29	Mateo Kovačić	(Croatia)	CM / AM / DM	6 May 1994 (aged 19)
11	Ricky Álvarez	(Argentina)	AM / SS / CM	12 April 1988 (aged 25)
14	Fredy Guarín	(Colombia)	CM / DM / AM	30 June 1986 (aged 27)
16	Gaby Mudingayi	(Belgium)	DM / CM	1 October 1981 (aged 31)
17	Zdravko Kuzmanović	(Serbia)	CM	22 September 1987 (aged 25)
19	Esteban Cambiasso	(Argentina)	DM / CM / CB	18 August 1980 (aged 32)
20	Joel Obi	(Nigeria)	CM / LM / RM	22 May 1991 (aged 22)
21	Walter Gargano	(Uruguay)	DM / CM	23 July 1984 (aged 28)
24	Marco Benassi	(Italy)	CM/DM	8 September 1994 (aged 18)
Forwards
8	Rodrigo Palacio	(Argentina)	SS / CF / LW	5 February 1982 (aged 31)
18	Tommaso Rocchi	(Italy)	CF	19 September 1977 (aged 35)
22	Diego Milito	(Argentina)	CF	12 June 1979 (aged 34)
99	Antonio Cassano	(Italy)	SS / AM / CF	12 July 1982 (aged 30)

== Transfers ==
=== In ===
==== Summer ====
No.	Pos.	Name	Age	Moving From	Type of Transfer	Contract Ends	Transfer fee	Notes	Source
13	MF	(Colombia) Fredy Guarín	25	(Portugal) Porto	Permanent move	2016	€ 11M	N/A	fcporto.pt
8	FW	(Argentina) Rodrigo Palacio	30	(Italy) Genoa	Transfer	2015	€10.5M	N/A	inter.it
7	MF	(Brazil) Philippe Coutinho	19	(Spain) Espanyol	Loan Return	20??	Free	N/A	
17	MF	(Kenya) MacDonald Mariga	25	(Italy) Parma	Loan return	2013	Free	N/A	
6	DF	(Argentina) Matías Silvestre	27	(Italy) Palermo	Loan	2013	€ 2M	Option to buy for € 6M	inter.it
1	GK	(Slovenia) Samir Handanović	27	(Italy) Udinese	Co-ownership	2016	€ 11M	+ co-ownership of Faraoni	inter.it
16	MF	(Belgium) Gaby Mudingayi	30	(Italy) Bologna	Loan	2013	€0.75M	Option to buy for €0.75M	inter.it
21	MF	(Uruguay) Walter Gargano	28	(Italy) Napoli	Loan	2013	€1.25M	Option to buy for €5.25M	inter.it
99	FW	(Italy) Antonio Cassano	30	(Italy) Milan	Transfer	2014	Free	Part of Pazzini deal	inter.it
33	DF	(Senegal) Ibrahima Mbaye	17	(Italy) Primavera	Promoted	20??	Free	N/A	
44	DF	(Italy) Matteo Bianchetti	19	(Italy) Primavera	Promoted	20??	Free	N/A	
24	MF	(Italy) Marco Benassi	18	(Italy) Primavera	Promoted	20??	Free	N/A	
88	FW	(Croatia) Marko Livaja	18	(Italy) Primavera	Promoted	20??	Free	N/A	
41	MF	(Ghana) Alfred Duncan	19	(Italy) Primavera	Promoted	20??	Free	N/A	
31	DF	(Uruguay) Álvaro Pereira	26	(Portugal) Porto	Transfer	2016	€ 10M	N/A	

==== Winter ====
No.	Pos.	Name	Age	Moving From	Type of Transfer	Contract Ends	Transfer fee	Notes	Source
18	FW	(Italy) Tommaso Rocchi	35	(Italy) Lazio	Transfer	2014	€0.5M	N/A	
10	MF	(Croatia) Mateo Kovačić	18	(Croatia) Dinamo Zagreb	Transfer	2017	€13.0M	N/A	
17	MF	(Serbia) Zdravko Kuzmanović	25	(Germany) VfB Stuttgart	Transfer	2017	€1.2M	N/A	
7	MF	(Italy) Ezequiel Schelotto	23	(Italy) Atalanta	Transfer	2017	€5.3M	N/A	
30	GK	(Argentina) Juan Pablo Carrizo	28	(Italy) Lazio	Transfer	2017	€0.3M	N/A	

Spend : ▼€46.5M

=== Out ===
==== Summer ====
No.	Pos.	Name	Age	Moving to	Type of transfer	Notes	Transfer fee	Source
21	GK	(Italy) Paolo Orlandoni	40	Retirement	End of contract	N/A	Free	inter.it
25	DF	(Colombia) Iván Córdoba	36	Retirement	End of contract	N/A	Free	inter.it
77	MF	(Ghana) Sulley Muntari	28	(Italy) Milan	End of contract	N/A	Free	
27	FW	(North Macedonia) Goran Pandev	29	(Italy) Napoli	Loan made permanent	N/A	€7.5M	
33	MF	(Slovakia) Juraj Kucka	25	(Italy) Genoa	Co-ownership	Friendly terms	€ 5M	
	GK	(Italy) Emiliano Viviano	26	(Italy) Palermo	Co-ownership deal	Friendly terms	€3.5M	
32	FW	(Argentina) Mauro Zárate	25	(Italy) Lazio	Loan return	N/A	Free	
17	MF	(Italy) Angelo Palombo	31	(Italy) Sampdoria	Loan return	N/A	Free	
18	MF	(Italy) Andrea Poli	23	(Italy) Sampdoria	Loan return	N/A	Free	
2	DF	(Brazil) Lúcio	34	(Italy) Juventus	Contract termination	N/A	Free	
37	DF	(Italy) Davide Faraoni	20	(Italy) Udinese	Co-ownership deal	Part of Samir Handanović deal	Free	
9	FW	(Uruguay) Diego Forlán	33	(Brazil) Internacional	Contract termination	N/A	Free	inter.it
30	FW	(Netherlands) Luc Castaignos	20	(Netherlands) Twente	Transfer	N/A	€ 6M	inter.it
7	FW	(Italy) Giampaolo Pazzini	28	(Italy) Milan	Transfer	+ Cassano	€7.5M	inter.it
1	GK	(Brazil) Júlio César	33	(England) Queens Park Rangers	Contract termination	N/A	Free	inter.it
3	DF	(Brazil) Maicon	31	(England) Manchester City	Transfer	N/A	€ 3M	
81	FW	(Italy) Samuele Longo	20	(Spain) Espanyol	Loan	N/A	Free	inter.it

==== Winter ====
No.	Pos.	Name	Age	Moving to	Type of transfer	Notes	Transfer fee	Source
10	MF	(Netherlands) Wesley Sneijder	28	(Turkey) Galatasaray	Transfer	N/A	€7.5M	Goal.com
41	MF	(Ghana) Alfred Duncan	19	(Italy) Livorno	Loan	2013	Free	N/A
44	DF	(Italy) Matteo Bianchetti	19	(Italy) Hellas Verona	Loan	2013	Free	N/A
52	MF	(Italy) Andrea Romanò	19	(Italy) Prato	Loan	2013	Free	N/A
7	MF	(Brazil) Philippe Coutinho	20	(England) Liverpool	Transfer	N/A	€10.2M	N/A
17	MF	(Kenya) MacDonald Mariga	25	(Italy) Parma	Loan	2013	Free	N/A
88	FW	(Croatia) Marko Livaja	19	(Italy) Atalanta	Co-ownership	Part of Schelotto deal	Free	N/A
82	MF	(Brazil) Daniel Bessa	20	(Italy) Vicenza	Loan	2013	Free	N/A

Transfer income: ▲€ 31.2M
Co-ownership income: ▲€ 8.5M
Total income : ▲€ 39.7M

=== Overall transfer activity ===
==== Spending ====
Summer: ▼€ 46.5M
Winter: ▼€ 19.2M
Total: ▼€ 65.2M

==== Income ====
Summer: ▲€ 32.5M
Winter: ▲€ 17.7M
Total: ▲€ 50.2M

==== Expenditure ====
Summer: ▼€ 14M
Winter: ▼€ 1.5M
Total: ▼€ 15.5M

== Club ==
=== Non-playing staff ===
Position	Staff
Coach	(Italy) Andrea Stramaccioni
Vice-coach	(Italy) Giuseppe Baresi
Team manager	(Colombia) Iván Córdoba
Head of scouts and youth academy	(Italy) Pierluigi Casiraghi
Technical director	(Italy) Marco Branca
Technical assistant	(Italy) Massimiliano Catini
Chief of fitness coaches	(Italy) Stefano Rapetti
Fitness coach	(Italy) Federico Pannoncini
Goalkeeper coach	(Italy) Alessandro Nista
Match analyst	(Italy) Michele Salzarulo
Chief of medical staff	(Italy) Franco Combi
Doctor	(Italy) Giorgio Panico
Rehabilitation coach	(Italy) Andrea Scannavino
Rehabilitation coach	(Italy) Maurizio Fanchini
Masseur/physiotherapist	(Italy) Marco Dellacasa
Masseur/physiotherapist	(Italy) Massimo Dellacasa
Masseur/physiotherapist	(Italy) Luigi Sessolo
Rehabilitation staff	(Italy) Andrea Galli
Rehabilitation staff	(Italy) Alberto Galbiati
Sporting director	(Italy) Piero Ausilio

Last updated: 9 July 2012
Source: inter.it

== Pre-season and friendlies ==
=== 2012 Indonesia tour ===
The Nerazzurri played two friendlies during their stay in Indonesia and both took place in Jakarta's Gelora Bung Karno Stadium, which hosted training sessions. The first match, held on 24 May, saw Inter took on a mixed starting eleven made up of players from the Indonesia under-23 side and the best players from the Indonesian Premier League. Inter met the Indonesia senior national team in their second game on 26 May.

24 May 2012 Indonesia Tour 2012	Indonesia XI	0–3	Internazionale	Jakarta, Indonesia
14:00 CET		Report	Longo 36'; Pazzini 53'; Tremolada 70'	Stadium: Gelora Bung Karno Stadium; Attendance: 20,000; Referee: Faulur Rossi

26 May 2012 Indonesia Tour 2012	Indonesia	2–4	Internazionale	Jakarta, Indonesia
14:30 CET	Wanggai 12'; Pahabol 90+3'	Report	Coutinho 6', 43'; Pazzini 61', 74'	Stadium: Gelora Bung Karno Stadium; Attendance: 50,000; Referee: Nagor Amir Bin Noor Mohamed

=== TIM Trophy ===
21 July 2012 Friendly	Internazionale	1–0	Juventus	Bari, Italy
20:45 CET	Coutinho 12'	Report		Stadium: Stadio San Nicola; Referee: Carmine Russo

21 July 2012 Friendly	Internazionale	2–1	Milan	Bari, Italy
22:45 CET	Guarín 25'; Palacio 34'	Report	El Shaarawy 16'	Stadium: Stadio San Nicola; Referee: Carmine Russo

=== Other friendlies ===
12 July 2012 Friendly	Trentino Team	0–6	Internazionale	Stadio Pineta, Pinzolo
17:00 CET		Report	Coutinho 3'; Milito 6', 40', 42'; Cambiasso 54'; Garritano 86'	Attendance: 4,000; Referee: Paolo Rosà

15 July 2012 Friendly	Internazionale	2–0	Koper	Rovereto, Italy
17:00 CET	Samuel 56'; Coutinho 71'	Report		Stadium: Stadio Quercia; Referee: Stefano Mollace

24 July 2012 Friendly	Como	2–3	Internazionale	Como, Italy
20:00 CET	Schiavino 41'; Mazzocca 89'	Report	Nagatomo 6'; Ranocchia 28'; Palacio 77'	Stadium: Stadio Giuseppe Sinigaglia; Attendance: 6,000; Referee: Francesco Borriello

28 July 2012 Friendly	Celtic	1–1	Internazionale	Glasgow, Scotland
13:30 GMT	Commons 41'	Report	Palacio 88'	Stadium: Celtic Park; Referee: William Collum

18 August 2012 Friendly	CA Bizertin	0–3	Internazionale	Locarno, Switzerland
20:45 CET		Report	Cambiasso 14'; Palacio 31', 64'	Stadium: Stadio del Lido

== Competitions ==
=== Overview ===
Competition	First match	Last match	Starting round	Final position	Record							
Competition	First match	Last match	Starting round	Final position	Pld	W	D	L	GF	GA	GD	Win %
Serie A	26 August 2012	19 May 2013	Matchday 1	9th	38	16	6	16	55	57	−2	42.11
Coppa Italia	18 December 2012	17 April 2013	Round of 16	Semi-finals	4	2	0	2	8	7	+1	50.00
Europa League	2 August 2012	14 March 2013	Group stage	Round of 16	14	8	3	3	27	17	+10	57.14
Total					56	26	9	21	90	81	+9	46.43

Last updated: 19 May 2013
Source: Serie A statistics, Coppa Italia statistics, UEFA Europa League statistics

=== Serie A ===
==== League table ====
Pos	Team	Pld	W	D	L	GF	GA	GD	Pts	Qualification or relegation
7	Lazio	38	18	7	13	51	42	+9	61	Qualification for the Europa League group stage (Note: Lazio qualified for the 2013–14 UEFA Europa League group stage after winning 2012–13 Coppa Italia.)
8	Catania	38	15	11	12	50	46	+4	56	
9	Inter Milan	38	16	6	16	55	57	−2	54	
10	Parma	38	13	10	15	45	46	−1	49	
11	Cagliari	38	12	11	15	43	55	−12	47	

Source: Serie A, Soccerway
Rules for classification: 1st points; 2nd head-to-head points; 3rd head-to-head goal difference; 4th goal difference; 5th number of goals scored; 6th public draw.
(Head-to-head record is applied for clubs with the same number of points only once all matches between said clubs have been played)

==== Results summary ====
Overall								Home						Away					
Pld	W	D	L	GF	GA	GD	Pts	W	D	L	GF	GA	GD	W	D	L	GF	GA	GD
38	16	6	16	55	57	−2	54	8	4	7	30	31	−1	8	2	9	25	26	−1

Last updated: 19 May 2013.
Source: Competitive matches

==== Results by round ====
Round	1	2	3	4	5	6	7	8	9	10	11	12	13	14	15	16	17	18	19	20	21	22	23	24	25	26	27	28	29	30	31	32	33	34	35	36	37	38
Ground	A	H	A	H	A	H	A	H	A	H	A	A	H	A	H	H	A	H	A	H	A	H	A	H	A	H	A	H	A	H	H	A	H	A	A	H	A	H
Result	W	L	W	L	W	W	W	W	W	W	W	L	D	L	W	W	L	D	L	W	D	D	L	W	L	D	W	L	W	L	L	L	W	L	L	L	D	L
Position	1	9	5	7	4	3	4	4	3	2	2	2	2	3	3	2	2	3	4	4	4	4	4	4	5	5	4	5	6	5	6	7	5	7	8	8	9	9

Updated to match(es) played on 19 May 2013. Source: AllTimeSoccer.com
A = Away; H = Home; W = Win; D = Draw; L = Loss

==== Matches ====
26 August 2012 1	Pescara	0–3	Internazionale	Pescara
20:45 CET	Weiss (yellow card) 12'; Colucci (yellow card) 33'; Zanon (yellow card) 36'	Report	Gargano (yellow card) 14'; Sneijder 17'; Milito 18'; Coutinho 81'	Stadium: Stadio Adriatico; Attendance: 22,000; Referee: Marco Guida

2 September 2012 2	Internazionale	1–3	Roma	Milan
20:45 CET	Guarín (yellow card) 33'; Cassano 45+1'; Ranocchia (yellow card) 47'	Report	Florenzi 15'; Destro (yellow card) 17'; Osvaldo 67', (yellow card) 66' (yellow-red card) 90+1'; Stekelenburg (yellow card) 77'; Marquinho 81'	Stadium: San Siro; Attendance: 43,385; Referee: Mauro Bergonzi

16 September 2012 3	Torino	0–2	Internazionale	Turin
20:45 CET	Bianchi (yellow card) 22'; Masiello (yellow card) 25'; Gazzi (yellow card) 71'; Glik (yellow card) 89'	Report	Milito 13'; Juan (yellow card) 34'; Nagatomo (yellow card) 38'; Handanović (yellow card) 64'; Guarín (yellow card) 78'; Cassano 83'	Stadium: Stadio Olimpico di Torino; Attendance: 26,000; Referee: Luca Banti

23 September 2012 4	Internazionale	0–2	Siena	Milan
15:00 CET	Juan (yellow card) 63'	Report	Rosina (yellow card) 11'; Calaiò (yellow card) 17'; Pegolo (yellow card) 60'; Ângelo (yellow card) 64'; Vergassola 73'; Valiani 90+2'	Stadium: San Siro; Attendance: 40,357; Referee: Davide Massa

26 September 2012 5	Chievo	0–2	Internazionale	Verona
20:45 CET	Rigoni (yellow card) 10'; Sardo (yellow card) 36'; Vacek (yellow card) 48'	Report	Samuel (yellow card) 5'; Pereira 43'; Cassano 74'	Stadium: Stadio Marc'Antonio Bentegodi; Attendance: 10,000; Referee: Sebastiano Peruzzo

30 September 2012 6	Internazionale	2–1	Fiorentina	Milan
20:45 CET	Milito 17' (pen.); Samuel (yellow card) 28'; Ranocchia (yellow card) 31'; Cassano 34'; Cambiasso (yellow card) 71'; Guarín (yellow card) 90+4'	Report	Rodríguez (yellow card) 16' (yellow-red card) 62'; Rômulo 40'; Fernández (yellow card) 55'; Roncaglia (yellow card) 64'; Jovetić (yellow card) 88'	Stadium: San Siro; Attendance: 41,082; Referee: Antonio Danilo Giannoccaro

7 October 2012 7	Milan	0–1	Internazionale	Milan
20:45 CET	Mexès (yellow card) 34'; De Jong (yellow card) 37'; Pazzini (yellow card) 82'; Montolivo (yellow card) 85'; Yepes (yellow card) 88'	Report	Samuel 3'; Juan (yellow card) 11'; Nagatomo (yellow card) 23' (yellow-red card) 48'; Ranocchia (yellow card) 83'	Stadium: San Siro; Attendance: 40,155; Referee: Paolo Valeri

21 October 2012 8	Internazionale	2–0	Catania	Milan
15:00 CET	Cassano 28'; Palacio 85'	Report	Legrottaglie (yellow card) 75'; Castro (yellow card) 88'	Stadium: San Siro; Attendance: 48,708; Referee: Carmine Russo

28 October 2012 9	Bologna	1–3	Internazionale	Bologna
15:00 CET	Pazienza (yellow card) 26'; Diamanti (yellow card) 51'; Cherubin 58'; Morleo (yellow card) 90+1'	Report	Mudingayi (yellow card) 16'; Ranocchia 27'; Milito 53'; Cambiasso 64'; Gargano (yellow card) 68'; Juan (yellow card) 78'	Stadium: Stadio Renato Dall'Ara; Attendance: 24,512; Referee: Andrea De Marco

31 October 2012 10	Internazionale	3–2	Sampdoria	Milan
20:45 CET	Mudingayi (yellow card) 32'; Milito 52' (pen.); Palacio 68'; Guarín 82'	Report	Munari 20'; Costa (red card) 51'; Munari (yellow card) 79'; Éder 90'	Stadium: San Siro; Attendance: 41,438; Referee: Daniele Doveri

4 November 2012 11	Juventus	1–3	Internazionale	Turin
20:45 CET	Vidal 1'; Lichtsteiner (yellow card) 30'; Pirlo (yellow card) 47'; Chiellini (yellow card) 51'; Bonucci (yellow card) 62'	Report	Samuel (yellow card) 33'; Milito 58' (pen.), 75'; Zanetti (yellow card) 84'; Palacio 89'	Stadium: Juventus Stadium; Attendance: 40,563; Referee: Paolo Tagliavento

11 November 2012 12	Atalanta	3–2	Internazionale	Bergamo
20:45 CET	Bonaventura 9'; Carmona (yellow card) 28'; Peluso (yellow card) 55'; Denis 60' (pen.), 67'; Parra (red card) 90+3'	Report	Gargano (yellow card) 53'; Guarín 56'; Palacio 84'	Stadium: Stadio Atleti Azzurri d'Italia; Attendance: 15,000; Referee: Antonio Damato

18 November 2012 13	Internazionale	2–2	Cagliari	Milan
15:00 CET	Palacio 10'; Cambiasso (yellow card) 26'; Gargano (yellow card) 41'; Astori 82' (o.g.)	Report	Sau (yellow card) 40', (goal) 43', 66'; Nainggolan (yellow card) 50'; Astori (yellow card) 52'; Ekdal (yellow card) 61'; Conti (yellow card) 73'; Agazzi (yellow card) 90'	Stadium: San Siro; Attendance: 51,671; Referee: Piero Giacomelli

26 November 2012 14	Parma	1–0	Internazionale	Parma
21:00 CET	Gobbi (yellow card) 37'; Valdés (yellow card) 71'; Sansone 75'	Report	Palacio (yellow card) 66'; Duncan (yellow card) 90+2'	Stadium: Stadio Ennio Tardini; Attendance: 16,147; Referee: Luca Banti

2 December 2012 15	Internazionale	1–0	Palermo	Milan
15:00 CET	Pereira (yellow card) 40'; Samuel (yellow card) 71'; García 74' (o.g.)	Report	Barreto (yellow card) 19'; García (yellow card) 54'; Kurtić (yellow card) 63'	Stadium: San Siro; Attendance: 42,113; Referee: Mauro Bergonzi

9 December 2012 16	Internazionale	2–1	Napoli	Milan
20:45 CET	Guarín 8'; Handanović (yellow card) 28'; Milito 39'; Gargano (yellow card) 58'	Report	Gamberini (yellow card) 43'; Cavani 54'; Pandev (yellow card) 60'; Behrami (yellow card) 61'; Britos (yellow card) 90+4'	Stadium: San Siro; Attendance: 41,000; Referee: Nicola Rizzoli

15 December 2012 17	Lazio	1–0	Internazionale	Rome
20:45 CET	Konko (yellow card) 66'; Klose 82'; Candreva (yellow card) 90'	Report	Gargano (yellow card) 45'; Samuel (yellow card) 52'	Stadium: Stadio Olimpico; Attendance: 45,500; Referee: Paolo Silvio Mazzoleni

22 December 2012 18	Internazionale	1–1	Genoa	Milan
12:30 CET	Ranocchia (yellow card) 26'; Cambiasso 85'; Chivu (yellow card) 90+3'	Report	Bertolacci (yellow card) 56'; Anselmo (yellow card) 70'; Immobile 77'	Stadium: San Siro; Attendance: 40,695; Referee: Andrea Gervasoni

6 January 2013 19	Udinese	3–0	Internazionale	Udine
12:30 CET	Danilo (yellow card) 32'; Allan (yellow card) 49'; Di Natale 63', 79'; Muriel 75'; Maicosuel (yellow card) 90+1'	Report	Pereira (yellow card) 9'; Palacio (yellow card) 25'; Juan (yellow card) 39' (yellow-red card) 65'	Stadium: Stadio Friuli; Attendance: 17,000; Referee: Antonio Danilo Giannoccaro

13 January 2013 20	Internazionale	2–0	Pescara	Milan
20:45 CET	Palacio 31' (yellow card) 46'; Guarín 54'; Benassi (yellow card) 56'	Report	Balzano (yellow card) 66'; Çerlik (yellow card) 69'	Stadium: San Siro; Attendance: 39,118; Referee: Domenico Celi

20 January 2013 21	Roma	1–1	Internazionale	Rome
20:45 CET	Totti 22' (pen.); Lamela (yellow card) 23'; Osvaldo (yellow card) 42'; De Rossi (yellow card) 44'	Report	Ranocchia (yellow card) 22'; Palacio 45+1'; Pereira (yellow card) 50'; Chivu (yellow card) 63'; Juan (yellow card) 76'; Handanović (yellow card) 78'; Rocchi (yellow card) 90'	Stadium: Stadio Olimpico; Attendance: 37,000; Referee: Daniele Orsato

27 January 2013 22	Internazionale	2–2	Torino	Milan
20:45 CET	Chivu 4'; Cambiasso 66'; Cambiasso (yellow card) 79'	Report	Meggiorini 23', 53'; Brighi (yellow card) 74'	Stadium: San Siro; Attendance: 40,128; Referee: Davide Massa

3 February 2013 23	Siena	3–1	Internazionale	Siena
15:00 CET	Emeghara 21'; Sestu 24'; Rosina 54' (pen.); Paci (yellow card) 57'; Belmonte (yellow card) 87'	Report	Cassano 22'; Chivu (red card) 55'; Guarín (yellow card) 85'	Stadium: Stadio Artemio Franchi – Montepaschi Arena; Attendance: 9,000; Referee: Daniele Doveri

10 February 2013 24	Internazionale	3–1	Chievo	Milan
20:45 CET	Cassano 2'; Ranocchia 26', (yellow card) 28'; Milito 50'; Stanković (yellow card) 90+3'	Report	Rigoni (yellow card) 18', (goal) 21'	Stadium: San Siro; Attendance: 42,000; Referee: Marco Guida

17 February 2013 25	Fiorentina	4–1	Internazionale	Florence
15:00 CET	Ljajić 13', 65'; Pasqual (yellow card) 27'; Jovetić 33', 55'; Pizarro (yellow card) 37'; Savić (yellow card) 71'	Report	Ranocchia (yellow card) 47'; Guarín (yellow card) 55'; Juan (yellow card) 58'; Pereira (yellow card) 67'; Cassano 87'	Stadium: Stadio Artemio Franchi; Attendance: 23,000; Referee: Nicola Rizzoli

24 February 2013 26	Internazionale	1–1	Milan	Milan
20:45 CET	Ranocchia (yellow card) 34'; Juan (yellow card) 43'; Schelotto 71'	Report	Mexès (yellow card) 12'; El Shaarawy 21'; Muntari (yellow card) 31'; Montolivo (yellow card) 49'; Zapata (yellow card) 89'	Stadium: San Siro; Attendance: 79,341; Referee: Paolo Silvio Mazzoleni

3 March 2013 27	Catania	2–3	Internazionale	Catania
20:45 CET	Bergessio 7', (yellow card) 70'; Marchese 19'; P. Álvarez (yellow card) 37'; Rolín (yellow card) 56'; Çani (yellow card) 87'	Report	R. Álvarez 52'; Handanović (yellow card) 70'; Palacio 70', 90+2'; Schelotto (yellow card) 84'	Stadium: Stadio Angelo Massimino; Attendance: 14,000; Referee: Mauro Bergonzi

10 March 2013 28	Internazionale	0–1	Bologna	Milan
20:45 CET	Stanković (yellow card) 39'; Juan (yellow card) 70'	Report	Gabbiadini (yellow card) 16'; Gilardino 57'; Naldo (yellow card) 85'	Stadium: San Siro; Attendance: 39,117; Referee: Gianpaolo Calvarese

3 April 2013^{1} 29	Sampdoria	0–2	Internazionale	Genoa
18:30 CEST	Poli (yellow card) 22'; Krstičić (yellow card) 76'	Report	Palacio 43', 90+3'; Gargano (yellow card) 65'; Handanović (yellow card) 73'; Kovačić (yellow card) 88'	Stadium: Stadio Luigi Ferraris; Attendance: 25,258; Referee: Luca Banti

30 March 2013 30	Internazionale	1–2	Juventus	Milan
15:00 CET	Gargano (yellow card) 16'; Pereira (yellow card) 47'; Palacio 54'; Ranocchia (yellow card) 62'; Cambiasso (red card) 90+5'	Report	Quagliarella 3'; Matri 60'; Barzagli (yellow card) 68'; Chiellini (yellow card) 89'; Giovinco (yellow card) 90'	Stadium: San Siro; Attendance: 79,341; Referee: Nicola Rizzoli

7 April 2013 31	Internazionale	3–4	Atalanta	Milan
20:45 CEST	Kovačić (yellow card) 5'; Rocchi 43'; Álvarez 57', 61'; Samuel (yellow card) 64'	Report	Bonaventura 56'; Denis 65' (pen.), 71', 77'; Scaloni (yellow card) 85'; Biondini (yellow card) 88'; Raimondi (red card) 90+1'	Stadium: San Siro; Attendance: 49,000; Referee: Andrea Gervasoni

14 April 2013 32	Cagliari	2–0	Internazionale	Quartu Sant'Elena
15:00 CEST	Conti (yellow card) 32'; Pinilla 63' (pen.), 76', (yellow card) 79'; Murru (yellow card) 72'	Report	Juan (yellow card) 9'; Pereira (yellow card) 45+1'; Silvestre (yellow card) 62'	Stadium: Stadio Is Arenas; Attendance: 10,000; Referee: Domenico Celi

21 April 2013 33	Internazionale	1–0	Parma	Milan
12:30 CEST	Pereira (yellow card) 49'; Rocchi 81'	Report	Valdés (yellow card) 50'; Amauri (yellow card) 77'	Stadium: San Siro; Attendance: 42,572; Referee: Antonio Damato

28 April 2013 34	Palermo	1–0	Internazionale	Palermo
15:00 CEST	Iličić 10'; Miccoli (yellow card) 11'; Morganella (yellow card) 57'; Barreto (yellow card) 58'; Hernández (yellow card) 89'	Report	Silvestre (yellow card) 45+1'; Juan (yellow card) 51'; Handanović (yellow card) 78'; Schelotto (yellow card) 86'	Stadium: Stadio Renzo Barbera; Attendance: 17,000; Referee: Daniele Orsato

5 May 2013 35	Napoli	3–1	Internazionale	Naples
20:45 CEST	Cavani 3', 33' (pen.), 78'; Behrami (yellow card) 90+2'	Report	Álvarez 23' (pen.); Jonathan (yellow card) 32'; Juan (yellow card) 62'; Ranocchia (yellow card) 76'	Stadium: Stadio San Paolo; Attendance: 39,000; Referee: Antonio Danilo Giannoccaro

8 May 2013 36	Internazionale	1–3	Lazio	Milan
20:45 CEST	Álvarez 33'; Ranocchia (yellow card) 45+3'; Juan (yellow card) 75'; Pereira (yellow card) 83'	Report	Handanović 22' (o.g.); Ledesma (yellow card) 33'; Hernanes 45+4' (pen.); Onazi 76'	Stadium: San Siro; Attendance: 47,000; Referee: Mauro Bergonzi

12 May 2013 37	Genoa	0–0	Internazionale	Genoa
12:30 CEST	Matuzalém (yellow card) 43'	Report	Guarín (yellow card) 36'	Stadium: Stadio Luigi Ferraris; Attendance: 20,000; Referee: Paolo Tagliavento

19 May 2013 38	Internazionale	2–5	Udinese	Milan
20:45 CEST	Juan 12', (yellow card) 59'; Pereira (yellow card) 28'; Rocchi 63'	Report	Pinzi 1', (yellow card) 79'; Domizzi 10'; Di Natale 40'; Silva 52'; Muriel 66'	Stadium: San Siro; Attendance: 46,000; Referee: Paolo Silvio Mazzoleni

Notes

- Note 1: Postponed from 17 March 2013 due to heavy rains in Genoa

=== Coppa Italia ===
==== Round of 16 ====
18 December 2012 Round of 16	Internazionale	2–0	Hellas Verona	Milan
20:45 CET	Silvestre (yellow card) 48' Cassano 50'; Guarín 54', (yellow card) 72'	Report	Bačinović (yellow card) 29'; Hallfreðsson (yellow card) 53'; Cacia (yellow card) 68'; Maietta (yellow card) 84'	Stadium: San Siro; Attendance: 11,840; Referee: Gianluca Rocchi

==== Quarter-finals ====
15 January 2013 Quarter-finals	Internazionale	3–2 (a.e.t.)	Bologna	Milan
21:00 CET	Guarín 34'; Palacio 77'; Pereira (yellow card) 80'; Ranocchia (yellow card) 96', (goal) 120'; Mudingayi (yellow card) 100'	Report	Guarente (yellow card) 15'; Gilardino (yellow card) 78'; Diamanti 81'; Gabbiadini 84', (yellow card) 93'; Motta (yellow card) 112'	Stadium: San Siro; Attendance: 8,734; Referee: Luca Banti

==== Semi-finals ====
23 January 2013 First leg	Roma	2–1	Internazionale	Rome
20:45 CET	Florenzi 13'; Destro 33'; Lamela (yellow card) 86'; Burdisso (yellow card) 90+2'	Report	Pereira (yellow card) 40'; Palacio 44'; Guarín (yellow card) 70'; Chivu (yellow card) 84'	Stadium: Stadio Olimpico; Attendance: 28,415; Referee: Andrea De Marco

17 April 2013 Second leg	Internazionale	2–3 (3–5 agg.)	Roma	Milan
20:45 CEST	Jonathan 22', (yellow card) 86'; Juan (yellow card) 61'; Álvarez 80'	Report	Destro 55', 69'; Torosidis 74'	Stadium: San Siro; Attendance: 52,634; Referee: Mauro Bergonzi

=== UEFA Europa League ===
==== Third qualifying round ====
The draw for UEFA Europa League Third qualifying round will take place on 20 July 2012. First leg is played on 2 August 2012 and second leg on 9 August 2012.

2 August 2012 First leg	Hajduk Split (Croatia)	0–3	(Italy) Internazionale	Split, Croatia
20:45 CEST	Maloča (yellow card) 18'; Radošević (yellow card) 90'	Report	Sneijder 18'; Nagatomo 44'; Coutinho 73'; Silvestre (yellow card) 90+2'	Stadium: Stadion Poljud; Attendance: 35,000; Referee: Hüseyin Göçek (Turkey)

9 August 2012 Second leg	Internazionale (Italy)	0–2 (3–2 agg.)	(Croatia) Hajduk Split	Milan, Italy
20:45 CEST	Samuel (yellow card) 6'	Report	Vukušić 23' (pen.); Radošević (yellow card) 55'; Vuković 58', (yellow card) 58'; Vršajević (yellow card) 62'	Stadium: San Siro; Attendance: 44,154; Referee: Clément Turpin (France)

==== Play-off round ====
The draw for UEFA Europa League Play-off round will take place on 10 August 2012. First leg is played on 23 August 2012 and second leg on 30 August 2012.

23 August 2012 First leg	Vaslui (Romania)	0–2	(Italy) Internazionale	Piatra Neamț, Romania
20:45 CEST	Varga (yellow card) 90+1'	Report	Cambiasso 23'; Maicon (yellow card) 72'; Palacio 73'; Coutinho (yellow card) 76'	Stadium: Stadionul Ceahlăul; Attendance: 13,500; Referee: Bas Nijhuis (Netherlands)

30 August 2012 Second leg	Internazionale (Italy)	2–2 (4–2 agg.)	(Romania) Vaslui	Milan, Italy
20:45 CEST	Castellazzi (red card) 33'; Palacio 76'; Guarín (yellow card) 81' (goal) 90+2'; Coutinho (yellow card) 84'	Report	Stanciu 35' (pen.); Cordoș (yellow card) 67'; Varela 79'; Sânmărtean (yellow card) 83'; Antal (yellow card) 88'	Stadium: San Siro; Attendance: 41,326; Referee: Manuel de Sousa (Portugal)

==== Group stage ====
Group H
Team	Pld	W	D	L	GF	GA	GD	Pts
(Russia) Rubin Kazan	6	4	2	0	10	3	+7	14
(Italy) Internazionale	6	3	2	1	11	9	+2	11
(Azerbaijan) Neftchi Baku	6	0	3	3	4	8	−4	3
(Serbia) Partizan	6	0	3	3	3	8	−5	3

20 September 2012 1	Internazionale (Italy)	2–2	(Russia) Rubin Kazan	Milan, Italy
21:05 CET	Livaja 39'; Guarín (yellow card) 89'; Nagatomo 90+2'	Report	Ryazantsev 17'; Bocchetti (yellow card) 36'; Marcano (yellow card) 74'; Orbaiz (yellow card) 76'; Rondón 84'	Stadium: San Siro; Attendance: 28,472; Referee: Deniz Aytekin (Germany)

4 October 2012 2	Neftchi Baku (Azerbaijan)	1–3	(Italy) Internazionale	Baku, Azerbaijan
18:00 CET	Canales 53'	Report	Coutinho 10'; Obi (yellow card) 25' (goal) 30'; Livaja 42'; Ranocchia (yellow card) 73'; Pereira (yellow card) 84'; Jonathan (yellow card) 88'	Stadium: Tofiq Bahramov Republican Stadium; Attendance: 31,400; Referee: Kevin Blom (Netherlands)

25 October 2012 3	Internazionale (Italy)	1–0	(Serbia) Partizan	Milan, Italy
19:00 CET	Silvestre (yellow card) 32'; Jonathan (yellow card) 47'; Palacio 88'	Report	Kamara (yellow card) 33'; Tomić (yellow card) 44'; Ivanov (yellow card) 62'; Šćepović (yellow card) 89'	Stadium: San Siro; Attendance: 18,626; Referee: Liran Liany (Israel)

8 November 2012 4	Partizan (Serbia)	1–3	(Italy) Internazionale	Belgrade, Serbia
21:05 CET	Ostojić (yellow card) 48'; Mitrović (yellow card) 73'; Jojić (yellow card) 78'; Tomić 90+1'	Report	Palacio 51', 75'; Juan (yellow card) 55'; Silvestre (yellow card) 73'; Guarín 87'	Stadium: Stadion FK Partizan; Attendance: 17,186; Referee: Duarte Gomes (Portugal)

22 November 2012 5	Rubin Kazan (Russia)	3–0	(Italy) Internazionale	Kazan, Russia
18:00 CET	Karadeniz 2'; Rondón 82', 90+2'	Report	Livaja (yellow card) 35'; Gargano (yellow card) 40'; Silvestre (yellow card) 72'	Stadium: Central Stadium; Attendance: 18,000; Referee: Tommy Skjerven (Norway)

6 December 2012 6	Internazionale (Italy)	2–2	(Azerbaijan) Neftchi Baku	Milan, Italy
21:05 CET	Romanò (yellow card) 15'; Livaja 9', 54' (yellow card) 89'	Report	Sadiqov 52'; Imamverdiyev (yellow card) 62'; Canales 89'; Seyidov (yellow card) 90+1'	Stadium: San Siro; Attendance: 6,150; Referee: Emir Alečković (Bosnia and Herzegovina)

==== Knockout phase ====
===== Round of 32 =====
14 February 2013 First leg	Internazionale (Italy)	2–0	(Romania) CFR Cluj	Milan, Italy
21:05 CET	Palacio 20', 87'; Pereira (yellow card) 32'; Nagatomo (yellow card) 70'	Report	Maah (yellow card) 67'; Mureșan (yellow card) 82'; Bjelanović (yellow card) 89'	Stadium: San Siro; Attendance: 14,790; Referee: Michael Koukoulakis (Greece)

21 February 2013 Second leg	CFR Cluj (Romania)	0–3 (5–0 agg.)	(Italy) Internazionale	Cluj-Napoca, Romania
19:00 CET	Kapetanos (yellow card) 38'; Camora (red card) 80'; Cadú (yellow card) 84'	Report	Kovačić (yellow card) 15'; Guarín 22', 45+1'; Benassi 89'	Stadium: Stadionul Dr. Constantin Rădulescu; Attendance: 11,027; Referee: Pawel Gil (Poland)

===== Round of 16 =====
7 March 2013 First leg	Tottenham Hotspur (England)	3–0	(Italy) Internazionale	London, England
21:05 CET	Bale 6' (yellow card) 15'; Sigurðsson 18'; Vertonghen 53'	Report	Guarín (yellow card) 72'; Pereira (yellow card) 77'	Stadium: White Hart Lane; Attendance: 34,353; Referee: Antonio Mateu Lahoz (Spain)

14 March 2013 Second leg	Internazionale (Italy)	4–1 (a.e.t.) (4–4a agg.)	(England) Tottenham Hotspur	Milan, Italy
19:00 CET	Cassano 20'; Palacio 52'; Gallas 75' (o.g.); Álvarez 110'	Report	Livermore (yellow card) 14'; Friedel (yellow card) 44'; Walker (yellow card) 78'; Holtby (yellow card) 79'; Adebayor 96' (yellow card) 115'	Stadium: San Siro; Attendance: 18,241; Referee: Ivan Bebek (Croatia)

== Statistics ==
=== Squad statistics ===
	League	Europe	Cup	Total Stats
Games played	38	14	4	56
Games won	16	8	2	26
Games drawn	6	3	0	9
Games lost	16	3	2	21
Goals scored	55	27	8	90
Goals conceded	57	17	7	81
Goal difference	-2	10	1	9
Clean sheets	17	3	1	21
Goal by Substitute	6	9	2	17
Total shots	–	–	–	–
Shots on target	–	–	–	–
Corners	–	–	–	–
Players used	36	35	28	–
Offsides	–	–	–	–
Fouls suffered	–	–	–	–
Fouls committed	–	–	–	–
Yellow cards	84	26	10	120
Red cards	4	1	–	5

Last updated: 19 May 2013
Source: Serie A statistics, UEFA Europa League statistics, Coppa Italia statistics

Players Used: Internazionale has used a total of – different players in all competitions.

=== Goalscorers ===
No.	Pos.	Nation	Name	Serie A	Coppa Italia	UEFA Europa League	Total
8	FW	(Argentina)	Rodrigo Palacio	12	2	8	22
14	MF	(Colombia)	Fredy Guarín	4	2	4	10
99	FW	(Italy)	Antonio Cassano	8	1	1	10
22	FW	(Argentina)	Diego Milito	9	0	0	9
11	MF	(Argentina)	Ricky Álvarez	5	1	1	7
19	MF	(Argentina)	Esteban Cambiasso	3	0	1	4
88	FW	(Croatia)	Marko Livaja	0	0	4	4
7	MF	(Brazil)	Philippe Coutinho	1	0	2	3
18	FW	(Italy)	Tommaso Rocchi	3	0	0	3
23	DF	(Italy)	Andrea Ranocchia	2	1	0	3
10	MF	(Netherlands)	Wesley Sneijder	1	0	1	2
55	DF	(Japan)	Yuto Nagatomo	0	0	2	2
7	MF	(Italy)	Ezequiel Schelotto	1	0	0	1
20	MF	(Nigeria)	Joel Obi	0	0	1	1
24	MF	(Italy)	Marco Benassi	0	0	0	1
25	DF	(Argentina)	Walter Samuel	1	0	0	1
26	DF	(Romania)	Cristian Chivu	1	0	0	1
31	MF	(Uruguay)	Álvaro Pereira	1	0	0	1
42	DF	(Brazil)	Jonathan Moreira	0	1	0	1
40	DF	(Brazil)	Juan Jesus	1	0	0	1
#	Own goals			2	0	1	3
TOTAL				55	8	27	90

Last updated: 19 May 2013

Source: Soccerway

=== Clean sheets ===
The list is sorted by shirt number when total appearances are equal.

Rnk	No.	Player	Serie A	UEFA Europa League	Coppa Italia	Total
1	1	(Slovenia) Samir Handanović	9	4	0	13
2	12	(Italy) Luca Castellazzi	1	1	1	3
3	27	(Slovenia) Vid Belec	0	0	0	0
3	30	(Argentina) Juan Pablo Carrizo	0	0	0	0
Total			10	5	1	16

Last updated: 19 May 2013.
Source: Soccerway

=== Disciplinary record ===
Includes all competitive matches. The list is sorted by position, and then shirt number.

				Serie A			UEFA Europa League			Coppa Italia			Total		
No.	Position	Nation	Name	Yellow card	Yellow card Red card	Red card	Yellow card	Yellow card Red card	Red card	Yellow card	Yellow card Red card	Red card	Yellow card	Yellow card Red card	Red card
Goalkeepers
1	GK	(Slovenia)	Samir Handanović	2	0	0	0	0	0	0	0	0	2	0	0
12	GK	(Italy)	Luca Castellazzi	0	0	0	0	0	1	0	0	0	0	0	1
Defenders
4	DF	(Argentina)	Javier Zanetti (C)	1	0	0	0	0	0	0	0	0	1	0	0
6	DF	(Argentina)	Matías Silvestre	0	0	0	4	0	0	0	0	0	4	0	0
23	DF	(Italy)	Andrea Ranocchia	3	0	0	1	0	0	0	0	0	4	0	0
2	DF	(Argentina)	Walter Samuel	3	0	0	1	0	0	0	0	0	4	0	0
17	MF	(Uruguay)	Álvaro Pereira	0	0	0	1	0	0	0	0	0	1	0	0
14	DF	(Brazil)	Juan Jesus	4	0	0	1	0	0	0	0	0	5	0	0
42	DF	(Brazil)	Jonathan	0	0	0	2	0	0	0	0	0	2	0	0
55	DF	(Japan)	Yuto Nagatomo	3	1	0	o	0	0	0	0	0	3	1	0
Midfielders
11	MF	(Argentina)	Ricky Álvarez	1	0	0	0	0	0	0	0	0	1	0	0
13	MF	(Colombia)	Fredy Guarín	3	0	0	2	0	0	0	0	0	5	0	0
16	MF	(Belgium)	Gaby Mudingayi	2	0	0	0	0	0	0	0	0	2	0	0
5	MF	(Argentina)	Esteban Cambiasso	2	0	1	o	0	0	0	0	0	2	0	1
20	MF	(Nigeria)	Joel Obi	0	0	0	1	0	0	0	0	0	1	0	0
3	MF	(Uruguay)	Walter Gargano	4	0	0	1	0	0	0	0	0	5	0	0
Forwards
88	FW	(Croatia)	Marko Livaja	0	0	0	1	0	0	0	0	0	0	0	0

Last Updated: 22 November 2012
