= 2013–14 Inter Milan season =

Internazionale
2013–14 season
- President: Massimo Moratti (until 15 November 2013); Erick Thohir
- Head coach: Walter Mazzarri
- Stadium: San Siro
- Serie A: 5th
- Coppa Italia: Round of 16
- Top goalscorer: League: Rodrigo Palacio (17); All: Rodrigo Palacio (19)
- Highest home attendance: 79,343 vs Juventus (14 September 2013, Serie A)
- Lowest home attendance: 12,714 vs Trapani (4 December 2013, Coppa Italia)
- Average home league attendance: 46,246
| Home colours | Away colours |

The 2013–14 season was Football Club Internazionale Milano's 105th in existence and 98th consecutive season in the top flight of Italian football. The team competed in Serie A and the Coppa Italia, finishing fifth in the league and qualifying for the 2014–15 UEFA Europa League.

== Season overview ==
On 24 May 2013, five days after the conclusion of the season, head coach Andrea Stramaccioni was fired and replaced by Walter Mazzarri. The June begun with Inter announcing the new one-year contract renewals of veterans Javier Zanetti and Walter Samuel. Players such as Tommaso Rocchi and Walter Gargano left the club after their respective contract expired. Antonio Cassano was sold at Parma for an undisclosed fee, while Giulio Donati and Luca Caldirola were sold in Germany respectively to Bayer Leverkusen and Werder Bremen. On 2 July, Inter and Deutsche Bank sign a partnership agreement, with Deutsche Bank becoming the club's new top sponsor.

The club was very active during the summer transfer window, notably acquiring the signings of Hugo Campagnaro, Ishak Belfodil, Mauro Icardi and Marco Andreolli, with the latter returning after six years. Dejan Stanković left the club after nine years by terminating his contract a year early by mutual consent, while youngsters Marco Benassi and Francesco Bardi signed contract extensions with the club, keeping them at Inter until 30 June 2017; they also went on loan at Livorno for the upcoming season. Backup goalkeeper Juan Pablo Carrizo also signed a new two-year contract.

Without European football as a distraction, Inter finished the season in fifth place qualifying for the Europa League: on September 22, Inter achieved its largest away win in Serie A beating Sassuolo 7–0. Inter managed to break some records, such as most goals scored in away games (35) and goals scored by defenders (16): in opposition, it had collected the most home draws (9) and fewest penalty kicks. In November 2013, Indonesian businessman Erick Thohir was elected as new Inter president, replacing Massimo Moratti, who remained as honorary president.

This season was the last for Javier Zanetti (who made his debut in 1995, becoming captain in 1999), Esteban Cambiasso (who had played for Inter since 2004), Walter Samuel (signed in 2005), Cristian Chivu (signed in 2007) and Diego Milito (who arrived in 2009, just prior to Inter's treble-winning 2009–10 season).

== Players ==
=== Squad information ===
As of 30 January 2014

| Squad no. | Name | Nationality | Position | Date of birth (age) |
Goalkeepers
| 1 | Samir Handanović | (Slovenia) | GK | 14 July 1984 (aged 29) |
| 12 | Luca Castellazzi | (Italy) | GK | 19 July 1975 (aged 38) |
| 30 | Juan Pablo Carrizo | (Argentina) | GK | 6 May 1984 (aged 30) |
Defenders
| 2 | Jonathan | (Brazil) | RB/RM | 27 February 1986 (aged 28) |
| 4 | Javier Zanetti (Captain) | (Argentina) | RB/CM/RM | 10 August 1973 (aged 40) |
| 5 | Juan Jesus | (Brazil) | CB/LB | 10 June 1991 (aged 23) |
| 6 | Marco Andreolli | (Italy) | CB | 10 June 1986 (aged 28) |
| 14 | Hugo Campagnaro | (Argentina) | CB/RB | 27 June 1980 (aged 34) |
| 18 | Wallace | (Brazil) | RB/RM/RW | 1 May 1994 (aged 20) |
| 23 | Andrea Ranocchia | (Italy) | CB | 16 February 1988 (aged 26) |
| 25 | Walter Samuel | (Argentina) | CB | 23 March 1978 (aged 36) |
| 26 | Cristian Chivu | (Romania) | LB/CB/DM | 26 October 1980 (aged 33) |
| 31 | Álvaro Pereira | (Uruguay) | LB/LM | 28 November 1985 (aged 28) |
| 33 | Danilo D'Ambrosio | (Italy) | RB/LB/CB | 9 September 1988 (aged 25) |
| 35 | Rolando | (Portugal) | CB | 31 August 1985 (aged 28) |
| 54 | Isaar Donkor | (Ghana) | CB | 15 August 1995 (aged 18) |
| 55 | Yuto Nagatomo | (Japan) | RB/LB | 16 May 1986 (aged 28) |
Midfielders
| 10 | Mateo Kovačić | (Croatia) | CM/AM/DM | 6 May 1994 (aged 20) |
| 11 | Ricky Álvarez | (Argentina) | AM/SS/CM | 12 April 1988 (aged 26) |
| 13 | Fredy Guarín | (Colombia) | CM/DM/AM | 30 June 1986 (aged 28) |
| 16 | Gaby Mudingayi | (Belgium) | DM/CM | 1 October 1981 (aged 32) |
| 17 | Zdravko Kuzmanović | (Serbia) | CM | 22 September 1987 (aged 26) |
| 19 | Esteban Cambiasso | (Argentina) | DM/CM/CB | 18 August 1980 (aged 33) |
| 20 | Rubén Botta | (Argentina) | AM/SS/LW | 31 January 1990 (aged 24) |
| 21 | Saphir Taïder | (Algeria) | CM/DM/AM | 29 February 1992 (aged 22) |
| 77 | McDonald Mariga | (Kenya) | DM/CM | 4 April 1987 (aged 27) |
| 88 | Hernanes | (Brazil) | AM/CM/DM | 29 May 1985 (aged 29) |
| 90 | Patrick Olsen | (Denmark) | DM/CM/AM | 23 April 1994 (aged 20) |
Forwards
| 7 | Ishak Belfodil | (Algeria) | FW/LW/SS | 12 January 1992 (aged 22) |
| 8 | Rodrigo Palacio | (Argentina) | FW/SS | 5 February 1982 (aged 32) |
| 9 | Mauro Icardi | (Argentina) | FW | 19 February 1993 (aged 21) |
| 22 | Diego Milito | (Argentina) | FW | 12 June 1979 (aged 35) |
| 97 | Federico Bonazzoli | (Italy) | FW | 21 May 1997 (aged 17) |

== Pre-season and friendlies ==
=== Pinzolo training camp ===
| 17 July 2013 Friendly | Trentino Select XI | 0–3 | Internazionale | Pinzolo |
| 17:00 CEST | | Report | Palacio 59'; Capello 68'; Álvarez 74' | Stadium: Stadio La Pineta; Attendance: 2,000; Referee: Paolo Barbera |

| 22 July 2013 Friendly | Internazionale | 3–1 | Vicenza | Pinzolo |
| 17:00 CEST | Guarín 7'; Belfodil 40'; Pereira 83' | | Giacomelli 6' | Stadium: Stadio La Pineta; Attendance: 4,800; Referee: Mattia Chemotti |

| 23 July 2013 Friendly | Internazionale | 2–0 | FeralpiSalò | Rovereto |
| 17:00 CEST | Campagnaro 33'; Palacio 55' | | | Stadium: Stadio Comunale La Quercia; Attendance: 1,500; Referee: Bontadi di Trento |

=== International Champions Cup ===
| August 1, 2013 Round 1 | Chelsea | 2–0 | Internazionale | Indianapolis, Indiana, United States |
| 20:00 EDT (UTC−04:00) | Oscar 13'; Hazard 29' (pen.) | Report | | Stadium: Lucas Oil Stadium; Attendance: 41,983; Referee: Ismail Elfath (United States) |

| August 4, 2013 Round 2 | Valencia | 4–0 | Internazionale | New York City, New York, United States |
| 16:00 EDT (UTC−04:00) | Banega 7'; Viera 34', 90'; Jonas 56' | Report | | Stadium: MetLife Stadium; Attendance: 39, 764; Referee: Mark Kadlecik (United States) |

| August 6, 2013 Seventh Place | Internazionale | 1–1 (9–8 p) | Juventus | Miami Gardens, Florida, United States |
| 18:30 EDT (UTC−04:00) | Álvarez 28' | Report | Vidal 45' (pen.) | Stadium: Sun Life Stadium; Attendance: 38,513; Referee: Alan Chapman (United States) |
| | Penalties |
| | (penalty missed) Guarín; (penalty scored) Ranocchia; (penalty scored) Álvarez; (penalty scored) Icardi; (penalty scored) Belfodil; (penalty scored) Olsen; (penalty scored) Andreolli; (penalty scored) Pereira; (penalty scored) Jonathan; (penalty scored) Carrizo | | Giovinco (penalty missed); Marchisio (penalty scored); Llorente (penalty scored); Pirlo (penalty scored); Vidal (penalty scored); Ogbonna (penalty scored); Cáceres (penalty scored); Chiellini (penalty scored); De Ceglie (penalty scored); Isla (penalty missed) |

=== Other friendlies ===
| July 27, 2013 Friendly | Hamburger SV | 1–1 | Internazionale | Hamburg, Germany |
| 15:30 CEST | Rudņevs 47' | Report | Icardi 2' | Stadium: Imtech Arena; Attendance: 12,000; Referee: Florian Meyer (Germany) |

| August 10, 2013 Friendly | Internazionale | 0–3 | Real Madrid | St. Louis, Missouri, United States |
| 20:00 CEST | | Report | Kaká 11'; Ronaldo 38'; Álvarez 67' (o.g.) | Stadium: Edward Jones Dome; Attendance: 54,184; Referee: Ismail Elfath (United States) |

== Competitions ==
=== Overview ===
| Competition | First match | Last match | Starting round | Final position | Record | | | | | | | |
| Competition | First match | Last match | Starting round | Final position | Pld | W | D | L | GF | GA | GD | Win % |
|---|---|---|---|---|---|---|---|---|---|---|---|---|
| Serie A | 25 August 2013 | 18 May 2014 | Matchday 1 | 5th | 38 | 15 | 15 | 8 | 62 | 39 | +23 | 39.47 |
| Coppa Italia | 18 August 2013 | 9 January 2014 | Third round | Round of 16 | 3 | 2 | 0 | 1 | 7 | 3 | +4 | 66.67 |
| Total | | | | | 41 | 17 | 15 | 9 | 69 | 42 | +27 | 41.46 |

Last updated: 18 May 2014
Source: Serie A statistics, Coppa Italia statistics

=== Serie A ===
==== League table ====
| Pos | Team | Pld | W | D | L | GF | GA | GD | Pts | Qualification or relegation |
|---|---|---|---|---|---|---|---|---|---|---|
| 3 | Napoli | 38 | 23 | 9 | 6 | 77 | 39 | +38 | 78 | Qualification for the Champions League play-off round |
| 4 | Fiorentina | 38 | 19 | 8 | 11 | 65 | 44 | +21 | 65 | Qualification for the Europa League group stage (Note: Since the 2013–14 Coppa Italia champions Napoli and runners–up Fiorentina qualified for the 2014–15 European football season thus 4th, 5th and 6th in Serie A (barring any failure to receive a "UEFA licence" from the FIGC or a ban from European competition) would qualify for group stage, play-off round and third qualifying round respectively.) |
| 5 | Internazionale | 38 | 15 | 15 | 8 | 62 | 39 | +23 | 60 | Qualification for the Europa League play-off round |
| 6 | Parma | 38 | 15 | 13 | 10 | 58 | 46 | +12 | 58 | |
| 7 | Torino | 38 | 15 | 12 | 11 | 58 | 48 | +10 | 57 (Note: Torino finished ahead of Milan on goal difference : Torino 2-2 Milan, Milan 1-1 Torino; Torino = +10, Milan = +8.) | Qualification for the Europa League third qualifying round (Note: The FIGC rejected the application of Parma for a UEFA licence, because Parma had overdue tax debt; their place went to seventh-place Torino, which had a UEFA licence.) |

Source: Serie A, Soccerway
Rules for classification: 1st points; 2nd head-to-head points; 3rd head-to-head goal difference; 4th goal difference; 5th number of goals scored; 6th public draw.
(Head-to-head record is applied for clubs with the same number of points only once all matches between said clubs have been played)

==== Results summary ====
| Overall | | | | | | | | Home | | | | | | Away | | | | | |
| Pld | W | D | L | GF | GA | GD | Pts | W | D | L | GF | GA | GD | W | D | L | GF | GA | GD |
|---|---|---|---|---|---|---|---|---|---|---|---|---|---|---|---|---|---|---|---|
| 38 | 15 | 15 | 8 | 62 | 39 | +23 | 60 | 8 | 9 | 2 | 27 | 18 | +9 | 7 | 6 | 6 | 35 | 21 | +14 |

Last updated: 18 May 2014.
Source: Competitive matches

==== Results by round ====
| Round | 1 | 2 | 3 | 4 | 5 | 6 | 7 | 8 | 9 | 10 | 11 | 12 | 13 | 14 | 15 | 16 | 17 | 18 | 19 | 20 | 21 | 22 | 23 | 24 | 25 | 26 | 27 | 28 | 29 | 30 | 31 | 32 | 33 | 34 | 35 | 36 | 37 | 38 |
|---|---|---|---|---|---|---|---|---|---|---|---|---|---|---|---|---|---|---|---|---|---|---|---|---|---|---|---|---|---|---|---|---|---|---|---|---|---|---|
| Ground | H | A | H | A | H | A | H | A | H | A | A | H | A | H | H | A | H | A | H | A | H | A | H | A | H | A | H | A | H | H | A | H | A | A | H | A | H | A |
| Result | W | W | D | W | W | D | L | D | W | D | W | W | D | D | D | L | W | L | D | L | D | L | W | W | D | D | W | W | L | D | D | D | W | W | D | L | W | L |
| Position | 2 | 2 | 3 | 3 | 2 | 4 | 4 | 5 | 4 | 4 | 4 | 4 | 4 | 4 | 4 | 5 | 5 | 6 | 5 | 5 | 5 | 6 | 5 | 5 | 5 | 5 | 5 | 5 | 6 | 5 | 5 | 5 | 5 | 5 | 5 | 5 | 5 | 5 |

Updated to match(es) played on 18 May 2014. Source: Competitive matches
A = Away; H = Home; W = Win; D = Draw; L = Loss

==== Matches ====
| 25 August 2013 1 | Internazionale | 2–0 | Genoa | Milan |
| 18:00 CEST | Nagatomo 75'; Jonathan (yellow card) 89'; Palacio 90+3'; Guarín (yellow card) 90+4' | Report | Gilardino (yellow card) 64'; Perin (yellow card) 72'; Manfredini (yellow card) 87' | Stadium: San Siro; Attendance: 44,797; Referee: Marco Guida |

| 1 September 2013 2 | Catania | 0–3 | Internazionale | Catania |
| 20:45 CEST | Spolli (yellow card) 45+2'; Doukara (yellow card) 72' | Report | Palacio 20', (yellow card) 66'; Nagatomo (yellow card) 43', (goal) 56'; Álvarez 80' | Stadium: Stadio Angelo Massimino; Attendance: 18,821; Referee: Antonio Damato |

| 14 September 2013 3 | Internazionale | 1–1 | Juventus | Milan |
| 18:00 CEST | Campagnaro (yellow card) 15'; Ranocchia (yellow card) 62'; Icardi 73' | Report | Lichtsteiner (yellow card) 17'; Vidal (yellow card) 61', (goal) 75' | Stadium: San Siro; Attendance: 79,343; Referee: Daniele Orsato |

| 22 September 2013 4 | Sassuolo | 0–7 | Internazionale | Reggio Emilia |
| 12:30 CEST | Magnanelli (yellow card) 13'; Missiroli (yellow card) 22'; Bianco (yellow card) 90' | Report | Palacio 7'; Taïder (yellow card) 16', (goal) 23'; Pucino 33' (o.g.); Álvarez 53'; Milito 63', 83'; Cambiasso 74' | Stadium: Stadio Città del Tricolore; Attendance: 22,001; Referee: Carmine Russo |

| 26 September 2013 5 | Internazionale | 2–1 | Fiorentina | Milan |
| 20:45 CEST | Ranocchia (yellow card) 43'; Juan (yellow card) 59'; Nagatomo (yellow card) 70'; Cambiasso 72'; Campagnaro (yellow card) 74'; Jonathan 83' | Report | Ambrosini (yellow card) 49'; Rossi 60' (pen.) | Stadium: San Siro; Attendance: 42,691; Referee: Paolo Valeri |

| 29 September 2013 6 | Cagliari | 1–1 | Internazionale | Cagliari |
| 15:00 CEST | Conti (yellow card) 14'; Pinilla (yellow card) 35'; Rossettini (yellow card) 37'; Nainggolan (yellow card) 57', (goal) 83' | Report | Juan (yellow card) 32'; Icardi 75'; Nagatomo (yellow card) 90' | Stadium: Stadio Nereo Rocco; Attendance: 3,000; Referee: Gianluca Rocchi |

| 5 October 2013 7 | Internazionale | 0–3 | Roma | Milan |
| 20:45 CEST | Juan (yellow card) 32'; Pereira (yellow card) 39' | Report | Pjanić (yellow card) 15'; Totti 18', 40' (pen.); Benatia (yellow card) 28'; Castán (yellow card) 30'; Florenzi 44'; Balzaretti (yellow card) 50' (yellow-red card) 79'; De Sanctis (yellow card) 68'; Taddei (yellow card) 89' | Stadium: San Siro; Attendance: 62,336; Referee: Paolo Tagliavento |

| 20 October 2013 8 | Torino | 3–3 | Internazionale | Turin |
| 20:45 CEST | Cerci (penalty missed) 7'; Gazzi (yellow card) 33'; Farnerud 21', (yellow card) 37'; Immobile 53', (yellow card) 80'; Bellomo 90' | Report | Handanović (red card) 5'; Taïder (yellow card) 26'; Guarín 45+1'; Palacio 55', 71'; Cambiasso (yellow card) 78' | Stadium: Stadio Olimpico di Torino; Attendance: 20,881; Referee: Daniele Doveri |

| 26 October 2013 9 | Internazionale | 4–2 | Hellas Verona | Milan |
| 20:45 CEST | Jonathan 9', (yellow card) 89'; Palacio 11', (yellow card) 54'; Cambiasso (yellow card) 11', (goal) 37'; Rolando 56'; Belfodil (red card) 90+3' | Report | Cacciatore (yellow card) 26'; Martinho 32'; Donadel (yellow card) 67'; Rômulo 71'; Iturbe (yellow card) 90'; Moras (red card) 90+3' | Stadium: San Siro; Attendance: 56,466; Referee: Domenico Celi |

| 29 October 2013 10 | Atalanta | 1–1 | Internazionale | Bergamo |
| 20:45 CET (UTC+01:00) | Denis 25'; Stendardo (yellow card) 55'; Canini (yellow card) 60' | Report | Álvarez 16'; Samuel (yellow card) 89' | Stadium: Stadio Atleti Azzurri d'Italia; Attendance: 14,000; Referee: Nicola Rizzoli |

| 3 November 2013 11 | Udinese | 0–3 | Internazionale | Udine |
| 15:00 CET | | Report | Palacio 25'; Ranocchia 30', (yellow card) 74'; Pereira (yellow card) 76'; Álvarez 90+2'; Juan (yellow card) 90+4' | Stadium: Stadio Friuli; Attendance: 5,400; Referee: Davide Massa |

| 9 November 2013 12 | Internazionale | 2–0 | Livorno | Milan |
| 20:45 CET (UTC+01:00) | Bardi 30' (o.g.); Ranocchia (yellow card) 32'; Samuel (yellow card) 33'; Nagatomo 90+1'; Rolando (yellow card) 90+4' | Report | Duncan (yellow card) 24'; Paulinho (yellow card) 73'; Schiattarella (yellow card) 82' | Stadium: San Siro; Attendance: 38,933; Referee: Sebastiano Peruzzo |

| 24 November 2013 13 | Bologna | 1–1 | Internazionale | Bologna |
| 20:45 CET | Kone 12', (yellow card) 38'; Diamanti (yellow card) 13'; Morleo (yellow card) 34'; Curci (yellow card) 62' | Report | Taïder (yellow card) 2'; Jonathan 51' | Stadium: Stadio Renato Dall'Ara; Attendance: 20,000; Referee: Luca Banti |

| 1 December 2013 14 | Internazionale | 1–1 | Sampdoria | Milan |
| 15:00 CET (UTC+01:00) | Álvarez (yellow card) 10'; Guarín 18', (yellow card) 78'; Campagnaro (yellow card) 76' | Report | Gabbiadini (yellow card) 11'; Costa (yellow card) 28'; Éder (yellow card) 45+1'; Renan 89' | Stadium: San Siro; Attendance: 43,706; Referee: Carmine Russo |

| 8 December 2013 15 | Internazionale | 3–3 | Parma | Milan |
| 20:45 CET | Palacio 44', 54'; Ranocchia (yellow card) 52'; Guarín 56'; Kovačić (yellow card) 82' | Report | Parolo (yellow card) 9', (goal) 45+1'; Sansone 11', 59' | Stadium: San Siro; Attendance: 33,732; Referee: Paolo Valeri |

| 15 December 2013 16 | Napoli | 4–2 | Internazionale | Naples |
| 20:45 CET | Higuaín 9'; Insigne (yellow card) 29'; Inler (yellow card) 32'; Mertens 39'; Džemaili 41'; Callejón 81' | Report | Cambiasso 35'; Nagatomo 45+2'; Álvarez (yellow card) 46' (yellow-red card) 71'; Ranocchia (yellow card) 90+2' | Stadium: Stadio San Paolo; Attendance: 42,555; Referee: Paolo Tagliavento |

| 22 December 2013 17 | Internazionale | 1–0 | Milan | Milan |
| 20:45 CET | Guarín (yellow card) 59'; Juan (yellow card) 67'; Rolando (yellow card) 71'; Palacio 86'; Campagnaro (yellow card) 90+3' | Report | De Sciglio (yellow card) 26'; Constant (yellow card) 45+2'; De Jong (yellow card) 62'; Balotelli (yellow card) 87'; Muntari (red card) 90+3' | Stadium: San Siro; Attendance: 79,311; Referee: Paolo Mazzoleni |

| 6 January 2014 18 | Lazio | 1–0 | Internazionale | Rome |
| 18:30 CET | Dias (yellow card) 21'; Radu (yellow card) 36'; Klose 81'; Ledesma (yellow card) 88' | Report | Guarín (yellow card) 36'; Álvarez (yellow card) 39' | Stadium: Stadio Olimpico; Attendance: 35,000; Referee: Antonio Damato |

| 13 January 2014 19 | Internazionale | 1–1 | Chievo | Milan |
| 21:00 CET | Nagatomo 12'; Kovačić (yellow card) 40' | Report | Paloschi 8'; Hetemaj (yellow card) 39' | Stadium: San Siro; Attendance: 32,765; Referee: Dino Tommasi |

| 19 January 2014 20 | Genoa | 1–0 | Internazionale | Genoa |
| 15:00 CET | Cofie (yellow card) 9'; Vrsaljko (yellow card) 58'; Bertolacci (yellow card) 60'; Sturaro (yellow card) 70'; Antonelli 83'; Konaté (yellow card) 84' | Report | Juan (yellow card) 71' | Stadium: Stadio Luigi Ferraris; Attendance: 20,274; Referee: Nicola Rizzoli |

| 26 January 2014 21 | Internazionale | 0–0 | Catania | Milan |
| 15:00 CET | Kuzmanović (yellow card) 32' | Report | Rinaudo (yellow card) 22'; Legrottaglie (yellow card) 76' | Stadium: San Siro; Attendance: 35,007; Referee: Andrea De Marco |

| 2 February 2014 22 | Juventus | 3–1 | Internazionale | Turin |
| 20:45 CET | Lichtsteiner 15'; Chiellini 47'; Vidal 55'; Pogba (yellow card) 59' | Report | Kuzmanović (yellow card) 13'; Rolando 71'; Álvarez (yellow card) 73' | Stadium: Juventus Stadium; Attendance: 38,979; Referee: Gianluca Rocchi |

| 9 February 2014 23 | Internazionale | 1–0 | Sassuolo | Milan |
| 20:45 CET | Samuel 48'; Botta (yellow card) 68' | Report | Rosi (yellow card) 55' | Stadium: San Siro; Attendance: 34,528; Referee: Sebastiano Peruzzo |

| 15 February 2014 24 | Fiorentina | 1–2 | Internazionale | Florence |
| 20:45 CET | Cuadrado 46'; Aquilani (yellow card) 60' | Report | Jonathan (yellow card) 16'; Palacio 34', (yellow card) 71'; Rolando (yellow card) 44'; Guarín (yellow card) 60'; Icardi 65'; Samuel (yellow card) 81' | Stadium: Stadio Artemio Franchi; Attendance: 35,584; Referee: Antonio Damato |

| 23 February 2014 25 | Internazionale | 1–1 | Cagliari | Milan |
| 15:00 CET | Juan (yellow card) 6'; Rolando 52' | Report | Dessena (yellow card) 25'; Pinilla 40' (pen.); Vecino (yellow card) 85'; Ekdal (yellow card) 86'; Ibarbo (yellow card) 90+4' | Stadium: San Siro; Attendance: 37,893; Referee: Carmine Russo |

| 1 March 2014 26 | Roma | 0–0 | Internazionale | Rome |
| 20:45 CET | | Report | Samuel (yellow card) 47' | Stadium: Stadio Olimpico; Attendance: 37,464; Referee: Mauro Bergonzi |

| 9 March 2014 27 | Internazionale | 1–0 | Torino | Milan |
| 15:00 CET | Palacio 30' | Report | Vives (yellow card) 53'; Tachtsidis (yellow card) 77'; Darmian (yellow card) 86'; Moretti (yellow card) 90+4' | Stadium: San Siro; Attendance: 43,543; Referee: Gianpaolo Calvarese |

| 15 March 2014 28 | Verona | 0–2 | Internazionale | Verona |
| 20:45 CET | Donati (yellow card) 28'; Albertazzi (yellow card) 54' | Report | Palacio 14'; Cambiasso (yellow card) 51'; Jonathan 63' | Stadium: Stadio Marc'Antonio Bentegodi; Attendance: 23,973; Referee: Luca Banti |

| 23 March 2014 29 | Internazionale | 1–2 | Atalanta | Milan |
| 15:00 CET | Icardi 36' | Report | Nica (yellow card) 34'; Bonaventura 35', 90'; Cigarini (yellow card) 45+3'; Stendardo (yellow card) 76'; Consigli (yellow card) 86' | Stadium: San Siro; Attendance: 39,098; Referee: Piero Giacomelli |

| 27 March 2014 30 | Internazionale | 0–0 | Udinese | Milan |
| 20:45 CET | Samuel (yellow card) 89' | Report | Scuffet (yellow card) 62' | Stadium: San Siro; Attendance: 36,840; Referee: Andrea Gervasoni |

| 31 March 2014 31 | Livorno | 2–2 | Internazionale | Livorno |
| 21:00 CEST | Paulinho 54'; Castellini (yellow card) 70'; Emeghara 85' | Report | Hernanes (yellow card) 20', (goal) 37'; Palacio 45+3'; Samuel (yellow card) 81'; Botta (yellow card) 87' | Stadium: Stadio Armando Picchi; Attendance: 10,000; Referee: Gianpaolo Calvarese |

| 5 April 2014 32 | Internazionale | 2–2 | Bologna | Milan |
| 20:45 CEST | Icardi 6', 63'; Ranocchia (yellow card) 81'; Milito (penalty missed) 84' | Report | Cristaldo 35'; Kone 73', (yellow card) 84' | Stadium: San Siro; Attendance: 38,817; Referee: Paolo Mazzoleni |

| 13 April 2014 33 | Sampdoria | 0–4 | Internazionale | Genoa |
| 15:00 CEST | Costa (yellow card) 15'; López (penalty missed) 18'; Éder (yellow card) 20' (yellow-red card) 20'; Soriano (yellow card) 39'; Regini (yellow card) 65'; Gastaldello (yellow card) 73'; Krstičić (yellow card) 76' | Report | Icardi 13', 63', (yellow card) 14'; Samuel (yellow card) 20', (goal) 60'; Ranocchia (yellow card) 28'; Palacio 79' | Stadium: Stadio Luigi Ferraris; Attendance: 24,060; Referee: Paolo Valeri |

| 19 April 2014 34 | Parma | 0–2 | Internazionale | Parma |
| 15:00 CEST | Paletta (yellow card) 20' (yellow-red card) 46'; Cassano (penalty missed) 44'; Lucarelli (yellow card) 47' | Report | Samuel (yellow card) 6'; Rolando 48', (yellow card) 79'; Hernanes (yellow card) 85'; Guarín 89' | Stadium: Stadio Ennio Tardini; Attendance: 12,000; Referee: Gianluca Rocchi |

| 26 April 2014 35 | Internazionale | 0–0 | Napoli | Milan |
| 20:45 CEST | Hernanes (yellow card) 61' | Report | Britos (yellow card) 26'; Henrique (yellow card) 37'; Ghoulam (yellow card) 82' | Stadium: San Siro; Attendance: 47,119; Referee: Nicola Rizzoli |

| 4 May 2014 36 | Milan | 1–0 | Internazionale | Milan |
| 20:45 CEST | Mexès (yellow card) 16'; De Jong 65', (yellow card) 89'; Abbiati (yellow card) 90+2' | Report | Cambiasso (yellow card) 39'; Samuel (yellow card) 75'; Ranocchia (yellow card) 80' | Stadium: San Siro; Attendance: 73,855; Referee: Mauro Bergonzi |

| 10 May 2014 37 | Internazionale | 4–1 | Lazio | Milan |
| 20:45 CEST | Palacio 7', 37', (yellow card) 30'; Icardi 34'; Hernanes 79' | Report | Biava 2'; Onazi (yellow card) 46' | Stadium: San Siro; Attendance: 64,718; Referee: Davide Massa |

| 18 May 2014 38 | Chievo | 2–1 | Internazionale | Verona |
| 20:45 CEST | Frey (yellow card) 61'; Obinna 73', 90'; Dramé (yellow card) 74' | Report | Andreolli (yellow card) 38', (goal) 41' | Stadium: Stadio Marc'Antonio Bentegodi; Attendance: 15,000; Referee: Gianluca Manganiello |

=== Coppa Italia ===
| 18 August 2013 Third round | Internazionale | 4–0 | Cittadella | Milan |
| 18:30 CEST | Jonathan 18'; Palacio 31' (pen.), 59'; Ranocchia 63'; Pereira (yellow card) 75'; Juan (yellow card) 84' | Report | Pecorini (red card) 30'; Pellizzer (yellow card) 36' | Stadium: San Siro; Attendance: 17,382; Referee: Massimiliano Irrati |

| 4 December 2013 Fourth round | Internazionale | 3–2 | Trapani | Milan |
| 21:00 CET | Marcone 4' (o.g.); Belfodil 40'; Taïder 44' | Report | Terlizzi (yellow card) 19'; Caccetta 54'; Madonia 90' | Stadium: San Siro; Attendance: 12,714; Referee: Riccardo Pinzani |

| 9 January 2014 Round of 16 | Udinese | 1–0 | Internazionale | Udine |
| 21:00 CET | Maicosuel 32'; Agyemang-Badu (yellow card) 57'; Allan (yellow card) 60'; Danilo (yellow card) 65'; Pinzi (yellow card) 73' | Report | Kovačić (yellow card) 21'; Carrizo (yellow card) 56' | Stadium: Stadio Friuli; Attendance: 6,242; Referee: Gianpaolo Calvarese |

== Statistics ==
=== Appearances and goals ===
As of 18 May 2014

| No. | Pos | Nat | Player | Total | | Serie A | | Coppa Italia | |
| No. | Pos | Nat | Player | Apps | Goals | Apps | Goals | Apps | Goals |
Goalkeepers
| 1 | GK | (Slovenia) SVN | Samir Handanović | 37 | 0 | 36 | 0 | 1 | 0 |
| 12 | GK | (Italy) ITA | Luca Castellazzi | 0 | 0 | 0 | 0 | 0 | 0 |
| 30 | GK | (Argentina) ARG | Juan Pablo Carrizo | 6 | 0 | 2+2 | 0 | 2 | 0 |
Defenders
| 2 | DF | (Brazil) BRA | Jonathan | 32 | 4 | 31 | 3 | 1 | 1 |
| 4 | DF | (Argentina) ARG | Javier Zanetti | 13 | 0 | 4+8 | 0 | 1 | 0 |
| 5 | DF | (Brazil) BRA | Juan Jesus | 29 | 0 | 27 | 0 | 2 | 0 |
| 6 | DF | (Italy) ITA | Marco Andreolli | 6 | 1 | 2+2 | 1 | 2 | 0 |
| 14 | DF | (Argentina) ARG | Hugo Campagnaro | 23 | 0 | 20+1 | 0 | 2 | 0 |
| 18 | DF | (Brazil) BRA | Wallace | 4 | 0 | 0+3 | 0 | 1 | 0 |
| 23 | DF | (Italy) ITA | Andrea Ranocchia | 26 | 2 | 23+1 | 1 | 2 | 1 |
| 25 | DF | (Argentina) ARG | Walter Samuel | 15 | 2 | 13+1 | 2 | 1 | 0 |
| 26 | DF | (Romania) ROU | Cristian Chivu | 0 | 0 | 0 | 0 | 0 | 0 |
| 31 | DF | (Uruguay) URU | Álvaro Pereira | 7 | 0 | 2+3 | 0 | 1+1 | 0 |
| 33 | DF | (Italy) ITA | Danilo D'Ambrosio | 11 | 0 | 8+3 | 0 | 0 | 0 |
| 35 | DF | (Portugal) POR | Rolando | 29 | 4 | 28+1 | 4 | 0 | 0 |
| 54 | DF | (Ghana) GHA | Isaac Donkor | 1 | 0 | 0 | 0 | 0+1 | 0 |
| 55 | DF | (Japan) JPN | Yuto Nagatomo | 36 | 5 | 32+2 | 5 | 2 | 0 |
Midfielders
| 10 | MF | (Croatia) CRO | Mateo Kovačić | 35 | 0 | 14+18 | 0 | 2+1 | 0 |
| 11 | MF | (Argentina) ARG | Ricky Álvarez | 31 | 4 | 25+4 | 4 | 1+1 | 0 |
| 13 | MF | (Colombia) COL | Fredy Guarín | 35 | 5 | 26+6 | 4 | 3 | 1 |
| 16 | MF | (Belgium) BEL | Gaby Mudingayi | 3 | 0 | 0+1 | 0 | 2 | 0 |
| 17 | MF | (Serbia) SRB | Zdravko Kuzmanović | 16 | 0 | 11+4 | 0 | 1 | 0 |
| 19 | MF | (Argentina) ARG | Esteban Cambiasso | 33 | 4 | 32 | 4 | 1 | 0 |
| 20 | MF | (Argentina) ARG | Rubén Botta | 0 | 0 | 0 | 0 | 0 | 0 |
| 21 | MF | (Algeria) ALG | Saphir Taïder | 26 | 2 | 13+12 | 1 | 1 | 1 |
| 77 | MF | (Kenya) KEN | McDonald Mariga | 0 | 0 | 0 | 0 | 0 | 0 |
| 88 | MF | (Brazil) BRA | Hernanes | 14 | 2 | 13+1 | 2 | 0 | 0 |
| 90 | MF | (Denmark) DEN | Patrick Olsen | 1 | 0 | 0 | 0 | 0+1 | 0 |
Forwards
| 7 | FW | (Algeria) ALG | Ishak Belfodil | 10 | 1 | 1+7 | 0 | 1+1 | 1 |
| 8 | FW | (Argentina) ARG | Rodrigo Palacio | 39 | 19 | 36+1 | 17 | 1+1 | 2 |
| 9 | FW | (Argentina) ARG | Mauro Icardi | 23 | 9 | 12+10 | 9 | 1 | 0 |
| 22 | FW | (Argentina) ARG | Diego Milito | 18 | 2 | 6+11 | 2 | 1 | 0 |
| 97 | FW | (Italy) ITA | Federico Bonazzoli | 2 | 0 | 0+1 | 0 | 0+1 | 0 |
Players transferred out during the season

=== Squad statistics ===
| | League | Cup | Total Stats |
|---|---|---|---|
| Games played | 38 | 3 | 41 |
| Games won | 15 | 2 | 17 |
| Games drawn | 15 | 0 | 15 |
| Games lost | 8 | 1 | 9 |
| Goals scored | 62 | 7 | 69 |
| Goals conceded | 39 | 3 | 42 |
| Goal difference | 23 | 4 | 27 |
| Clean sheets | 15 | 1 | 16 |
| Goal by Substitute | 5 | 0 | 5 |
| Total shots | – | – | – |
| Shots on target | – | – | – |
| Corners | – | – | – |
| Players used | 28 | 27 | – |
| Offsides | – | – | – |
| Fouls suffered | – | – | – |
| Fouls committed | – | – | – |
| Yellow cards | 72 | 4 | 76 |
| Red cards | 3 | – | 3 |

Last updated: 5 August 2008
Source: Serie A statistics, Coppa Italia statistics

Players Used: Internazionale has used a total of – different players in all competitions.

=== Goalscorers ===
| No. | Pos. | Nation | Name | Serie A | Coppa Italia | Total |
|---|---|---|---|---|---|---|
| 8 | FW | (Argentina) | Rodrigo Palacio | 17 | 2 | 19 |
| 9 | FW | (Argentina) | Mauro Icardi | 9 | 0 | 9 |
| 2 | DF | (Brazil) | Jonathan | 4 | 1 | 5 |
| 55 | DF | (Japan) | Yuto Nagatomo | 5 | 0 | 5 |
| 11 | MF | (Argentina) | Ricky Álvarez | 4 | 0 | 4 |
| 13 | MF | (Colombia) | Fredy Guarín | 4 | 0 | 4 |
| 19 | MF | (Argentina) | Esteban Cambiasso | 4 | 0 | 4 |
| 35 | DF | (Portugal) | Rolando | 4 | 0 | 4 |
| 21 | MF | (Algeria) | Saphir Taïder | 1 | 1 | 2 |
| 23 | DF | (Italy) | Andrea Ranocchia | 1 | 1 | 2 |
| 22 | FW | (Argentina) | Diego Milito | 2 | 0 | 2 |
| 25 | DF | (Argentina) | Walter Samuel | 2 | 0 | 2 |
| 88 | MF | (Brazil) | Hernanes | 2 | 0 | 2 |
| 6 | DF | (Italy) | Marco Andreolli | 1 | 0 | 1 |
| 7 | FW | (Algeria) | Ishak Belfodil | 0 | 1 | 1 |
| # | Own goals | | | 2 | 1 | 3 |
| TOTAL | | | | 62 | 7 | 69 |

Last updated: 31 May 2014

=== Clean sheets ===
The list is sorted by shirt number when total appearances are equal.

| Rnk | No. | Player | Serie A | Coppa Italia | Total |
|---|---|---|---|---|---|
| 1 | 1 | (Slovenia) Samir Handanović | 15 | 1 | 16 |
| 2 | 12 | (Italy) Luca Castellazzi | 0 | 0 | 0 |
| 3 | 30 | (Argentina) Juan Pablo Carrizo | 0 | 0 | 0 |
| Total | | | 15 | 1 | 16 |

Last updated: 31 May 2014.
Source: Internazionale
