= Fredy Guarín =

Colombian footballer (born 1986)

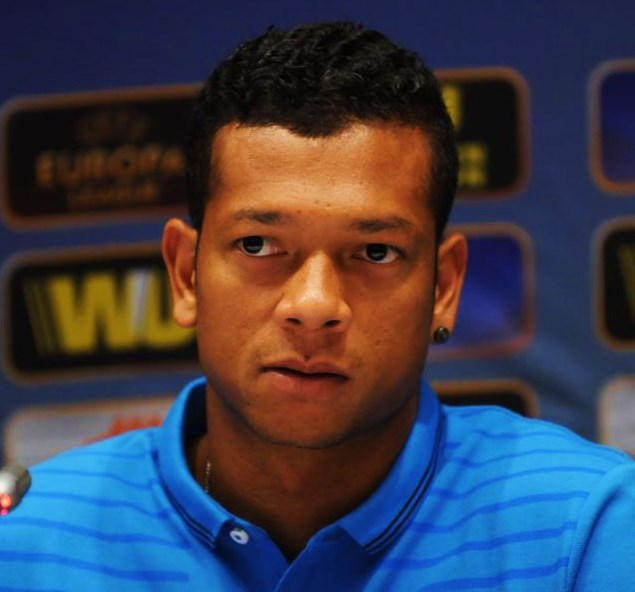
- Guarín in 2014

Personal information
- Full name: Fredy Alejandro Guarín Vásquez
- Date of birth: 30 June 1986 (age 40)
- Place of birth: Puerto Boyacá, Colombia
- Height: 1.83 m (6 ft 0 in)
- Position: Midfielder

Youth career
- Cooperamos Tolima

Senior career*
Years	Team	Apps	(Gls)
2002	Atlético Huila	5	(0)
2003–2007	Envigado	38	(4)
2005–2006	→ Boca Juniors (loan)	2	(0)
2006–2007	→ Saint-Étienne (loan)	18	(1)
2007–2008	Saint-Étienne	18	(0)
2008–2012	Porto	63	(11)
2012	→ Inter Milan (loan)	6	(0)
2012–2016	Inter Milan	108	(15)
2016–2019	Shanghai Shenhua	83	(21)
2019–2020	Vasco da Gama	13	(3)
2021	Millonarios	7	(1)
Total		396	(67)

International career
2003	Colombia U17	6	(2)
2003–2005	Colombia U20	7	(2)
2006–2015	Colombia	57	(4)
- * Club domestic league appearances and goals

Fredy Alejandro Guarín Vásquez (born 30 June 1986) is a Colombian former professional footballer who played as a midfielder.

He started his career with Envigado, then had a short spell in Argentina, and played two years in France with Saint-Étienne. He made a name for himself with Porto in Portugal, where he spent four seasons and won nine major honours, including three Primeira Liga championships and the 2011 Europa League.

Guarín represented Colombia at the 2011 Copa América and the 2014 World Cup.

== Club career ==
=== Early years and Saint-Étienne ===
Guarín was born in Puerto Boyacá. In 2005, already a regular for Envigado F.C. and the Colombian under-20 national team, he joined Boca Juniors of the Argentine Primera División, where he spent the first six months in the youth team. Upon completion of his loan the Buenos Aires-based club attempted to sign him on a permanent basis, but he instead chose to go on loan to AS Saint-Étienne in August 2006.

Guarín made his debut for the French side scoring twice in a friendly against RCD Espanyol, and gradually fought his way into the starting lineup as the season closed. He first appeared in the Ligue 1 on 14 October 2006 against Olympique Lyonnais, and scored his first goal in a 3–1 victory over Troyes AC.

In April 2007, the deal was made permanent for four years.

=== Porto ===
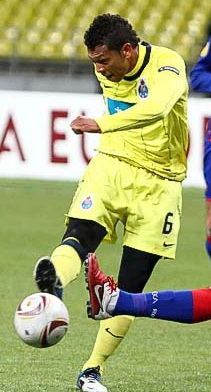
Guarín in action for Porto (2011)

On 10 July 2008, Guarín agreed a four-year contract with Primeira Liga club FC Porto for an undisclosed fee. Portuguese under-21 international Paulo Machado went the opposite direction, on loan. During his spell he was used mainly as a substitute, but managed to appear regularly; arguably, his most important goal came on 16 May 2010 as the team renewed their Taça de Portugal title, defeating G.D. Chaves 2–1.

In 2010–11, even after the departure of Raul Meireles to Liverpool, Guarín initially struggled to make Porto's starting XI. He was, however, a very important midfield element for the eventual national champions, playing 43 official games and scoring ten goals, including five in the Europa League campaign, which also ended in victory; one of his five in the league was a spectacular longe-range strike on 8 January 2011 against C.S. Marítimo, which was nominated by newspaper The Guardian as European Goal of the Season.

=== Inter Milan ===
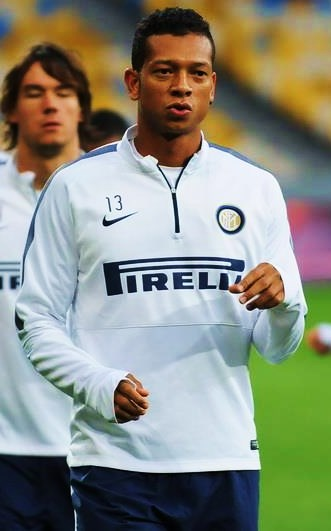
Guarín training with Inter in 2014

Guarín joined Inter Milan on 31 January 2012 for €1.5 million, on loan, with the player replacing Paris Saint-Germain FC-bound Thiago Motta. The Italians also had an option to make the move permanent for €13.5 million in June.

On 17 May 2012, a permanent deal was arranged, but for €11 million. Guarín scored his first official goal for the Nerazzurri on 30 August, in a 2–2 home draw against FC Vaslui in the Europa League (4–2 on aggregate). In the group stage of the same competition, he provided all three assists in a 3–1 defeat of Neftchi Baku PFC.

Again in the Europa League, on 21 February 2013, Guarín scored twice in a 3–0 away win over CFR Cluj (5–0 on aggregate) to help Inter make it through to the last 16. In the January 2014 transfer window, he was supposed to move to Juventus FC in exchange for Mirko Vučinić, but the deal ultimately fell through after the clubs could not reach an agreement. He declared he would not return if he was not allowed to leave, but eventually he reconsidered; it was later reported that he simply wanted to clarify his future with the club, stating that he never asked to leave and that he was confused as to why the situation was created.

On 25 March 2014, Guarín agreed to extend his contract until 2017. On 14 September, as a second-half replacement, he scored in a 7–0 home win against US Sassuolo Calcio. At the start of the 2014–15 season, he began being used by manager Walter Mazzarri as a second striker.

On 7 December 2014, in his 100th appearance for Inter, Guarín assisted Mauro Icardi in the 44th minute of an eventual 1–2 home defeat to Udinese Calcio. On 16 February of the following year, he scored twice after winning a first-minute penalty kick in a 4–1 victory at Atalanta BC, helping his team to secure the first away win in the league since December 2014.

=== Later career ===
On 26 January 2016, Guarín joined Shanghai Greenland Shenhua F.C. in the Chinese Super League for a reported €11 million fee plus bonuses. On 26 September 2019, the 33-year-old free agent moved to the Campeonato Brasileiro Série A with CR Vasco da Gama.

Guarín missed nine matches at the beginning of 2020 because his original contract had expired the previous December. The player signed a new deal in February, and made three appearances before the season was halted due to the COVID-19 pandemic. On 1 July, the club announced that he had been granted extended leave due to personal issues, raising uncertainty about his future; he was released by Vasco in September.

Guarín agreed to a one-year contract at Millonarios F.C. on 31 December 2020, again on a free transfer.

== International career ==
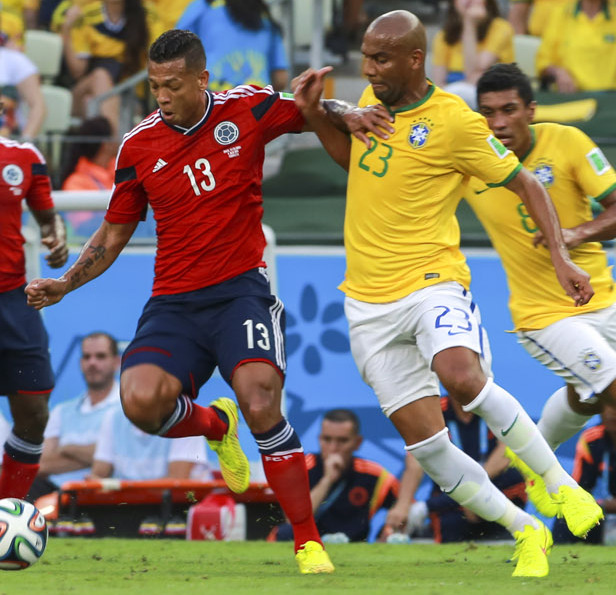
Guarín (left) playing for Colombia at the 2014 FIFA World Cup

On 24 May 2006, Guarín made his international debut for Colombia, in a pre-World Cup friendly against Ecuador. He represented the nation at the 2005 CONCACAF Gold Cup and the 2011 Copa América.

Guarín was selected by José Pekerman for his 2014 World Cup squad. He played his first game in the tournament on 24 June after the national team had already won its first two group matches, featuring the full 90 minutes in a 4–1 win against Japan which was also his 49th cap; he earned his 50th four days later, coming on as a late substitute to help oust Uruguay 2–0 in the round of 16.

On 10 May 2015, whilst at the service of Inter, Guarín suffered a muscular injury to his right leg, being ruled out of the Copa América.

== Style of play ==
Guarín was primarily an attacking midfielder who could also play in the centre, in a holding role or on the right flank. He was capable of shooting from long-range with both feet, and of acting as a playmaker in midfield.

In 2013, Guarín's Inter manager Andrea Stramaccioni described him as "...an extraordinary player who combines physicality with technique in an incredible way. He is also an important element in the locker room."

== Personal life ==
During an interview in May 2024, Guarín admitted that he struggled with alcoholism.

== Career statistics ==
=== Club ===
Appearances and goals by club, season and competition
Club	Season	League			National cup (Note: Includes Copa Colombia, Coupe de France, Taça de Portugal, Coppa Italia, Chinese FA Cup, Copa do Brasil)		League cup (Note: Includes Coupe de la Ligue, Taça da Liga)		Continental		Other		Total	
Club	Season	Division	Apps	Goals	Apps	Goals	Apps	Goals	Apps	Goals	Apps	Goals	Apps	Goals
Atlético Huila	2002	Categoría Primera A	36	11	0	0	—		—		—		36	11
Atlético Huila	2003	Categoría Primera A	5	0	0	0	—		—		—		5	0
Atlético Huila	Total		41	11	0	0	—		—		—		41	11
Envigado	2003	Categoría Primera A	5	0	0	0	—		—		—		5	0
Envigado	2004	Categoría Primera A	23	3	5	0	—		—		—		28	3
Envigado	2005	Categoría Primera A	10	1	0	0	—		—		—		10	1
Envigado	Total		38	4	5	0	—		—		—		43	4
Boca Juniors (loan)	2005–06	Primera División	2	0	—		—		—		—		2	0
Saint-Étienne (loan)	2006–07	Ligue 1	18	1	7	1	0	0	—		—		25	2
Saint-Étienne	2007–08	Ligue 1	18	0	5	2	0	0	—		—		23	2
Porto	2008–09	Primeira Liga	15	1	8	2	1	0	3 (Note: Appearances in UEFA Champions League)	0	1 (Note: Appearance in Supertaça Cândido de Oliveira)	0	28	3
Porto	2009–10	Primeira Liga	19	4	4	3	4	0	7	0	1	0	36	7
Porto	2010–11	Primeira Liga	22	5	5	0	2	0	14 (Note: Appearances in UEFA Europa League)	5	—		43	10
Porto	2011–12	Primeira Liga	7	1	0	0	2	0	2	0	2 (Note: One appearance in Supertaça Cândido de Oliveira, one appearance in UEFA Super Cup)	0	13	1
Porto	Total		63	11	17	5	10	0	26	5	4	0	120	21
Inter Milan (loan)	2011–12	Serie A	6	0	0	0	—		—		0	0	6	0
Inter Milan	2012–13	Serie A	32	4	3	2	—		12	4	–		47	10
Inter Milan	2013–14	Serie A	32	4	3	1	—		—		—		35	5
Inter Milan	2014–15	Serie A	28	6	1	0	—		8	1	—		37	7
Inter Milan	2015–16	Serie A	16	1	0	0	—		—		—		16	1
Inter Milan	Total		114	15	7	3	—		20	5	—		141	23
Shanghai Shenhua	2016	Chinese Super League	26	3	4	1	—		—		—		30	4
Shanghai Shenhua	2017	Chinese Super League	18	10	5	2	—		0	0	—		23	12
Shanghai Shenhua	2018	Chinese Super League	25	7	0	0	—		5 (Note: Appearances in AFC Champions League)	1	1 (Note: Appearance in Chinese FA Super Cup)	1	31	9
Shanghai Shenhua	2019	Chinese Super League	14	1	2	0	—		—		—		16	1
Shanghai Shenhua	Total		83	21	11	3	—		5	1	1	1	100	26
Vasco da Gama	2019	Série A	12	3	—		—		—		—		12	3
Vasco da Gama	2020	Série A	0	0	2	0	—		—		1	0	3	0
Vasco da Gama	Total		12	3	2	0	—		—		1	0	15	3
Millonarios	2021	Categoría Primera A	7	1	0	0	—		0	0	—		7	1
Career total			396	67	54	14	10	0	51	11	6	1	517	93

=== International ===
Appearances and goals by national team and year
National team	Year	Apps	Goals
Colombia	2006	5	0
Colombia	2007	1	0
Colombia	2008	10	0
Colombia	2009	8	0
Colombia	2010	1	0
Colombia	2011	11	2
Colombia	2012	3	0
Colombia	2013	8	1
Colombia	2014	6	1
Colombia	2015	4	0
Total		57	4

Scores and results list Colombia's goal tally first, score column indicates score after each Guarín goal.

List of international goals scored by Fredy Guarín
No.	Date	Venue	Opponent	Score	Result	Competition
1	26 March 2011	Estadio Vicente Calderón, Madrid, Spain	Ecuador	1–0	2–0	Friendly
2	11 November 2011	Metropolitano Roberto Meléndez, Barranquilla, Colombia	Venezuela	1–0	1–1	2014 World Cup qualification
3	14 August 2013	Mini Estadi, Barcelona, Spain	Serbia	1–0	1–0	Friendly
4	6 June 2014	Pedro Bidegain, Buenos Aires, Argentina	Jordan	3–0	3–0	Friendly

== Honours ==
Porto

- Primeira Liga: 2008–09, 2010–11, 2011–12
- Taça de Portugal: 2008–09, 2009–10, 2010–11
- Supertaça Cândido de Oliveira: 2009, 2011
- UEFA Europa League: 2010–11
- Taça da Liga runner-up: 2009–10
- UEFA Super Cup runner-up: 2011

Shanghai Shenhua

- Chinese FA Cup: 2017
