= Juan Jesus =

Brazilian footballer (born 1991)

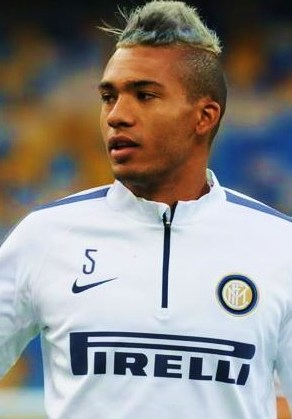
- Juan Jesus with Inter Milan in 2014

Personal information
- Full name: Juan Guilherme Nunes Jesus
- Date of birth: 10 June 1991 (age 35)
- Place of birth: Belo Horizonte, Brazil
- Height: 1.85 m (6 ft 1 in)
- Positions: Centre-back; left-back

Team information
- Current team: Venezia
- Number: 15

Youth career
- 2006–2009: Internacional

Senior career*
Years	Team	Apps	(Gls)
2010–2011	Internacional	41	(0)
2012–2016	Inter Milan	110	(1)
2016–2017	→ Roma (loan)	20	(0)
2017–2021	Roma	51	(1)
2021–2026	Napoli	99	(3)
2026–	Venezia	9	(0)

International career
2009–2011	Brazil U20	17	(0)
2012	Brazil U23	6	(0)
2012–2014	Brazil	4	(0)
Medal record
Representing Brazil
Men's Football
Silver medal – second place	2012 London	Team competition
- * Club domestic league appearances and goals as of 17:35, 22 November 2026 (UTC)

Juan Guilherme Nunes Jesus (Portuguese pronunciation: [huˈɐ̃ ʒɛˈzus]; born 10 June 1991), usually known as Juan Jesus or simply Juan or Juje, is a Brazilian professional footballer who plays as a defender for Serie A club Venezia. Mainly a centre-back, he can also play as a left-back.

== Club career ==
=== Internacional ===
In 2007, Juan Jesus joined the youth team of Sport Club Internacional. He made his debut on the first team in 2010, winning the 2010 Copa Libertadores, and in December 2011, the club sold him for about R$9.26 million (reported €3.8million fee); 65% of the economic rights of Juan went to his agent, Giuliano Bertolucci and 35% to third-party owner DIS Esporte. The owners of the registration rights of Juan, used a Brazilian club Coimbra Esporte Clube as middleman club.

=== Inter Milan ===
On 30 January 2012, Juan Jesus joined Serie A club Inter Milan. Inter disclosed the fee was €4M, but extra bonus clause was also reported. He made his first Serie A appearance for Inter on 13 May 2012, in the 3–1 away loss against Lazio after coming on as a last-minute substitute for Diego Milito.

During the 2012–13 season, Juan Jesus emerged as part of Inter's first choice starting XI, featuring alongside Andrea Ranocchia and Walter Samuel in a 3–5–2 system. He scored his first goal on 19 May 2013 in a 2–5 home defeat against Udinese, the last match of the domestic season. He ended the year with 44 appearances in all competitions, including 31 in Serie A with Inter, who finished the season in a disappointing ninth place and failed to qualify for either next season's UEFA Champions League or UEFA Europa League.

On 12 July 2013, Juan Jesus took the number 5 shirt after the departure of long-time player Dejan Stanković. In August 2013, he captained Inter for the first time in a friendly match against Real Madrid in the United States, which ended in a 3–0 loss.

On 24 September 2013, Juan Jesus renewed his contract with Inter until 2018 with a reported wage of €1.2 million per year.

Juan Jesus made his 100th appearance for Inter on 4 February 2015 in a game against Napoli in the quarter-finals of the Coppa Italia, which the Nerazzurri lost 1–0 away at Stadio San Paolo thanks to a late winner by Gonzalo Higuaín.

=== Roma ===
On 14 July 2016, Juan Jesus joined Roma on loan for €2 million in loan fees and a conditional obligation to purchase for an additional €8 million if certain conditions were met before the end of the loan deal. The purchase obligation was activated during the 2016–17 season, meaning that Jesus would join Roma on a permanent deal in the summer transfer window.

=== Napoli ===
On 18 August 2021, Juan Jesus joined Napoli on a season-long deal, with an option to extend his contract for the 2022–23 season.

=== Venezia ===
On 31 August 2026, Juan Jesus joined Venezia as a free agent, signing a one-year deal with the option of an additional year extension if certain conditions were met.

== International career ==
After having played in the under-18 and under-19 national teams, in early 2010, Juan Jesus was selected to the under-20 team by its manager, Ney Franco. In January 2011, he took part in the team's triumph at the 2011 South American U-20 Championship in Peru, playing all eight matches of the competition. In the same year, he participated in the FIFA U-20 World Cup, where Brazil reached the final against Portugal. Juan played the entire match, helping his side to a 3–2 victory after extra time.

Juan Jesus made his Brazilian first team debut against Denmark on 26 May 2012, playing the full 90 minutes in a 1–3 away victory.

Juan Jesus started in the centre of defence, alongside captain Thiago Silva, in all of Brazil's matches at the 2012 London Olympics, helping the nation to a silver medal.

He was an unused substitute as Brazil defeated Argentina 2–0 to win the 2014 Superclásico de las Américas in Beijing.

Since all his caps for Brazil were friendly matches, Juan did not rule out his chance to play for Italy national football team instead. However, it was reported that Juan did not have Italian citizenship (or citizenship of any European Union member), making him ineligible to Italy.

== Career statistics ==
=== Club ===
As of match played 22 November 2026

Appearances and goals by club, season and competition
Club	Season	League			National cup		Continental		Other		Total	
Club	Season	Division	Apps	Goals	Apps	Goals	Apps	Goals	Apps	Goals	Apps	Goals
Internacional	2010	Série A	7	0	0	0	1 (Note: Appearances in Copa Libertadores)	0	10 (Note: Appearances in Campeonato Gaúcho)	0	18	0
Internacional	2011	Série A	18	0	0	0	0	0	6	0	24	0
Internacional	Total		25	0	0	0	1	0	16	0	42	0
Inter Milan	2011–12	Serie A	1	0	0	0	0	0	0	0	1	0
Inter Milan	2012–13	Serie A	31	1	4	0	9 (Note: Appearances in UEFA Europa League)	0	–		44	1
Inter Milan	2013–14	Serie A	27	0	2	0	–		–		29	0
Inter Milan	2014–15	Serie A	32	0	2	0	11	0	–		45	0
Inter Milan	2015–16	Serie A	19	0	4	0	–		–		23	0
Inter Milan	Total		110	1	12	0	20	0	0	0	142	1
Roma (loan)	2016–17	Serie A	20	0	3	0	10	0	–		33	0
Roma	2017–18	Serie A	22	0	1	0	6 (Note: Appearances in UEFA Champions League)	0	–		29	0
Roma	2018–19	Serie A	20	1	1	0	3	0	–		24	1
Roma	2019–20	Serie A	4	0	0	0	1	0	–		5	0
Roma	2020–21	Serie A	5	0	0	0	6	0	–		11	0
Roma	Total		51	1	2	0	16	0	–		69	1
Napoli	2021–22	Serie A	21	1	1	0	6	0	–		28	1
Napoli	2022–23	Serie A	15	1	1	1	3	0	–		19	2
Napoli	2023–24	Serie A	24	1	0	0	5	0	2 (Note: Appearances in Supercoppa Italiana)	0	31	1
Napoli	2024–25	Serie A	15	0	2	1	–		–		17	1
Napoli	2025–26	Serie A	24	0	2	0	7	0	2	0	35	0
Napoli	Total		99	3	6	2	21	0	4	0	130	5
Venezia	2026–27	Serie A	9	0	0	0	–		–		9	0
Career total			314	5	23	2	68	0	20	0	425	7

== Honours ==
Internacional

- Copa Libertadores: 2010
- Campeonato Gaúcho: 2011
- Recopa Sudamericana: 2011

Napoli

- Serie A: 2022–23, 2024–25
- Supercoppa Italiana: 2025–26

Brazil

- South American Youth Championship: 2011
- FIFA U-20 World Cup: 2011
- Olympic Silver Medal: 2012
- Superclásico de las Américas: 2014
