= Marco Schiavino =

Italian footballer (born 1993)

Personal information
- Date of birth: 25 April 1993 (age 33)
- Place of birth: Rome, Italy
- Height: 1.85 m (6 ft 1 in)
- Position: Centre back

Team information
- Current team: Nuova Sondrio
- Number: 13

Youth career
- –2010: Cisco Roma
- 2010–2011: Valenciennes
- 2011–2012: Crotone

Senior career*
Years	Team	Apps	(Gls)
2012–2013	Como	23	(1)
2013–2014	Crotone	0	(0)
2013–2014	→ Ascoli (loan)	26	(2)
2014–2015	Paganese	6	(0)
2015	Torres	0	(0)
2015–2016	Paganese	7	(0)
2016	CS Vultur Rionero	10	(1)
2017	Gelbison	11	(1)
2017	Nardò	8	(0)
2017–2018	Acireale	15	(0)
2018–2022	Paganese	66	(6)
2022–2023	Team Altamura	15	(0)
2023	Palmese	9	(0)
2023–2024	Angri	19	(1)
2024–2025	Chieti	18	(0)
2025	Terracina	12	(0)
2025	Acerrana	8	(1)
2025–	Nuova Sondrio	13	(0)
- * Club domestic league appearances and goals as of 22 February 2026

Marco Schiavino (born 25 April 1993) is an Italian footballer who plays for Serie D club Nuova Sondrio.

== Biography ==
Born in Rome, capital of Italy, Schiavino started his career at Cisco Roma. In October 2010 he was signed by French club Valenciennes. Schiavino was a player of Crotone in the reserve league in 2011–12 season. On 12 July 2012 Schiavino was farmed to Como in co-ownership deal. Schiavino made his debut in pre-season friendlies. On 19 August he made his professional debut in Lega Pro cup. Schiavino also played the second cup match as well as the opening match of 2012–13 Lega Pro Prima Divisione. Schiavino made 18 starts in the third division that season. On 21 June 2013 Crotone reacquired Schiavino's registration rights after making a higher tender bid to Lega Serie B office. Schiavino also received call-up to Lega Pro under-21 representative team, against Russia and Oman.

In July 2013 Schiavino was signed by Ascoli. He was a player of reserve against the first team in the pre-season. On 5 August he also substituted Ivan Reali in the first round of Italian cup.

On 6 August 2018, he signed a one-year contract with Serie C club Paganese. He re-signed with Paganese for the 2019–20 season and subsequently until June 2022.
