= Francesco Borriello =

Italian footballer (born 2005)

Personal information
- Date of birth: 25 July 2005 (age 21)
- Place of birth: Catania, Italy
- Height: 1.89 m (6 ft 2 in)
- Position: Goalkeeper

Team information
- Current team: Reggiana
- Number: 12

Youth career
- 2014–2022: Catania
- 2022–2024: Parma

Senior career*
| Years | Team | Apps | (Gls) |
| 2021–2022 | Catania | 0 | (0) |
| 2022–2024 | Parma | 0 | (0) |
| 2024–2026 | Triestina | 1 | (0) |
| 2026– | Reggiana | 0 | (0) |

International career^{‡}
| 2021–2022 | Italy U17 | 2 | (0) |
| 2022–2023 | Italy U18 | 4 | (0) |
| 2023 | Italy U19 | 1 | (0) |
- * Club domestic league appearances and goals as of 30 August 2026 ‡ National team caps and goals as of 9 August 2023

Francesco Borriello (born 25 July 2005) is an Italian professional footballer who plays for Serie C Group B club Reggiana.

== Club career ==
Born in Catania, Sicily, Francesco Borriello came through the youth ranks of the local Calcio Catania.

Borriello made his professional debut for Catania on the 21 August 2021, starting in the 1-0 away Coppa C win against Vibonese.

In January 2022 he was transferred to Parma Calcio in Serie B, first joining the youth sector of the club, playing close to the likes of Italian idol Gianluigi Buffon.

On 15 July 2024, Borriello signed a three-season contract with Triestina in Serie C.

== International career ==
Borriello was first selected in the Italian under-17 team in 2021 whilst still at Catania, thus being the only one of his teammates playing in a Serie C club.

He was part of the Italy team playing the under-17 Euro 2022.
