= Andrea Stramaccioni =

Italian footballer and manager (born 1976)

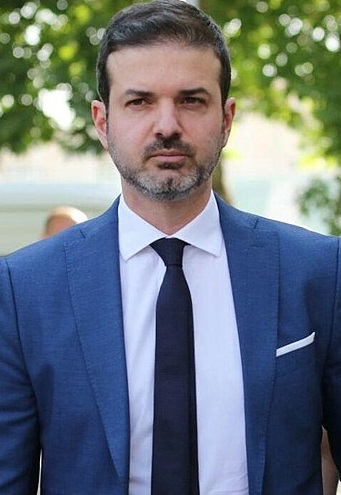
- Stramaccioni in 2019

Personal information
- Date of birth: 9 January 1976 (age 50)
- Place of birth: Rome, Italy
- Height: 1.83 m (6 ft 0 in)
- Position: Defender

Senior career*
| Years | Team | Apps | (Gls) |
| 1994–1995 | Bologna | 0 | (0) |

Managerial career
- 2012–2013: Inter Milan
- 2014–2015: Udinese
- 2015–2016: Panathinaikos
- 2017–2018: Sparta Prague
- 2019: Esteghlal
- 2021–2022: Al Gharafa
- * Club domestic league appearances and goals

Andrea Stramaccioni (Italian pronunciation: [anˈdrɛːa stramatˈtʃoːni]; born 9 January 1976) is an Italian football manager and former player who last managed Qatari club Al Gharafa.

A football coach with experiences as a youth coach of Roma and Inter Milan, he was put in charge of first team duties on 26 March 2012 to replace Claudio Ranieri. He is also a 2010 law graduate.

== Playing career ==
A former defender, his playing career was cut short by a serious knee injury while with Bologna in the 1994–95 season.

== Coaching career ==
=== Early years ===
He graduated in law at La Sapienza University of Rome, the largest Italian university. After retiring as a footballer, Stramaccioni went on to become a football coach for a number of amateur youth teams. At the age of 25, he won a provincial title with Rome-based youth team Az Sport, then being hired by Romulea where he worked until 2005. Stramaccioni obtained the licence for youth coaches in 2003.

=== Youth coach at Roma ===
In 2005, Stramaccioni joined the youth coaching staff at Roma, winning two national titles: Giovanissimi Nazionali in 2007 and Allievi Nazionali in 2010. On 9 May 2009, Stramaccioni obtained a UEFA A coaching licence (Italy second category licence), made him eligible to work as a head coach of Lega Pro teams or as a vice-coach of Serie A and Serie B clubs. Stramaccioni, however, did not have a UEFA Pro Licence (Italy first category licence), he could only work as a care-taker in the first and second division of Italy. On that day, Roberto Samaden, Inter youth academy director since 2006, also obtained the same licence. Samaden met Stramaccioni in the course and gave Stramaccioni a job in Inter two years later.

=== Inter Milan Primavera ===
After the departure of Fulvio Pea, who left Inter Milan Youth Sector in mid-2011 to become the new Sassuolo head coach, Samaden called Stramaccioni to offer him the vacant position at the club, which he accepted (Roma was unable to offer the same position to Stramaccioni as Alberto De Rossi was the coach of that team and 2011 champion). Inter Primavera was the first in the Group B of its own league as of round 21 (22), the last round Stramaccioni was in charge, ahead Milan with one more point (both 21 games) and Varese with two points (and Varese had one more game, 22). Inter round 22 match was rescheduled and Milan also had a match (round 17) rescheduled. Primavera had a record of 13 wins, four draws, four losses, 43 goals scored, and 19 goals scored against. Stramaccioni also led Inter Primavera to the final of the 2011–12 NextGen series, after defeating Sporting CP at the Estádio Dr. Magalhães Pessoa, Leiria and Marseille on 21 March at Griffin Park in London. The final was played on 25 March at the Matchroom Stadium. The match finished in a 1–1 draw, and Inter beat Ajax 5–3 in the resulting penalty shoot-out.

=== Inter Milan ===
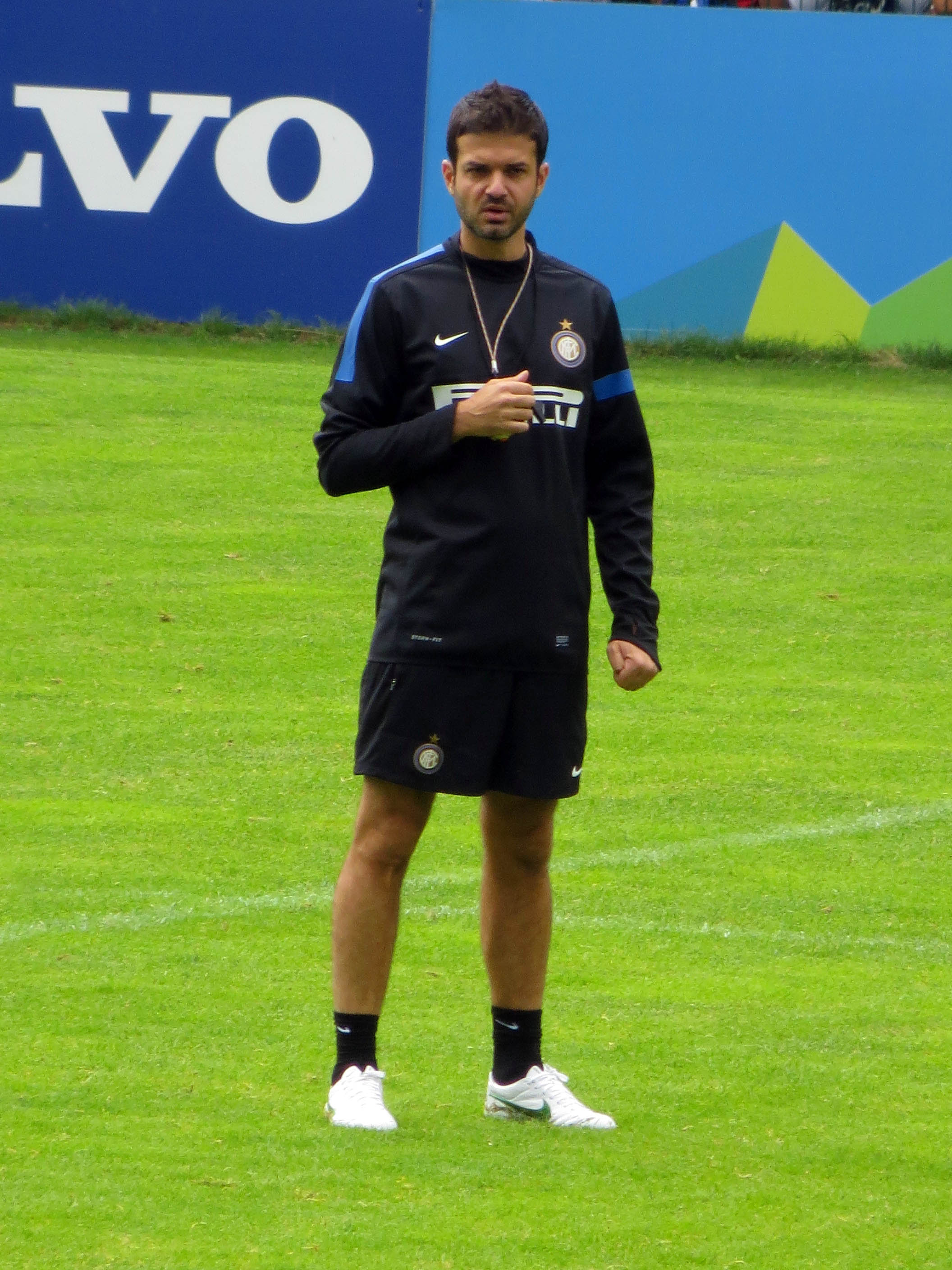
Stramaccioni with Inter in 2012.

On 26 March 2012, Inter manager Claudio Ranieri was sacked and Stramaccioni was promoted to manager of the first team as caretaker, with Giuseppe Baresi returning to act as assistant coach. He led Inter to sixth place and a success in the Derby della Madonnina against Milan that cost Inter's crosstown rivals the Serie A title; his results led club owner Massimo Moratti to confirm him as head coach for the 2012–13 season, as well. The FIGC allowed Stramaccioni to sign the contract without a UEFA Pro Licence as he was admitted to 2012–13 coaching course in order to obtain the licence in June 2013. On 7 October 2012, Stramaccioni guided Inter to a 1–0 victory over Milan, emotionally crying "è vostro, è vostro, questo derby è vostro" (Italian for "it's yours, it's yours, this derby is yours") towards Inter supporters at the end of the game. On 3 November 2012, Stramaccioni guided Inter to a 3–1 away victory over the previous season's champions, Juventus, claiming "[The] result will send a signal, as we came here to the Juventus Stadium against a team unbeaten in 49 rounds and attacked them with a trident". After 14 months in charge of Inter and a difficult 2012–13 Serie A campaign which saw them finish in 9th place and thus fail to qualify for Europe for the first time in 15 seasons, the club announced on 24 May 2013 that Stramaccioni had been sacked and replaced by Walter Mazzarri.

=== Udinese ===
On 4 June 2014, Stramaccioni was named as new head coach of Udinese. On 1 June 2015, he stepped down as Udinese head coach after just one year (his contract expired at the end of the June).

=== Panathinaikos ===
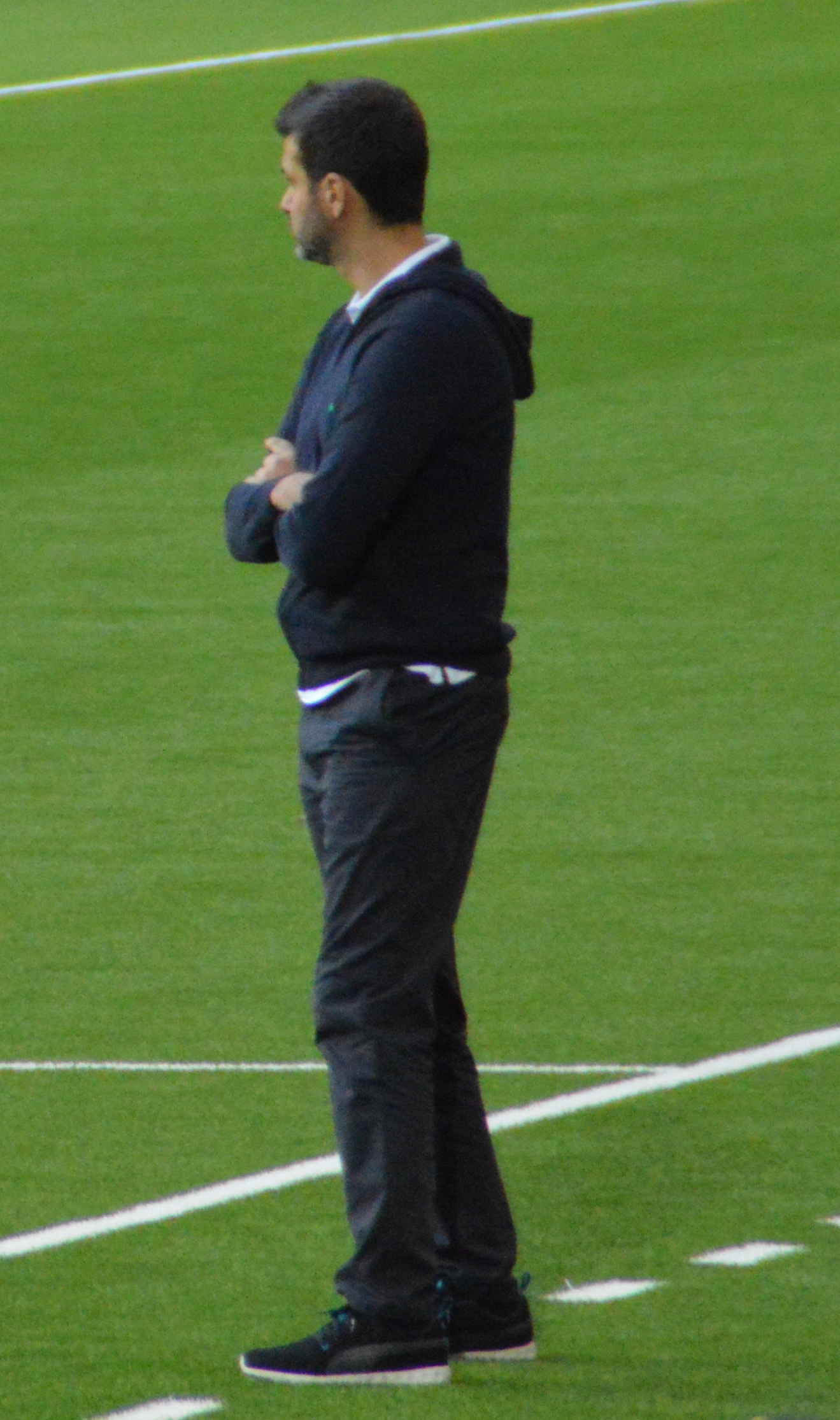
Andrea Stramaccioni during a Europa League qualifier in Stockholm, Sweden

On 8 November 2015, Stramaccioni was appointed as manager of Super League Greece club Panathinaikos, signing a one-and-a-half-year deal until the end of the 2016–17 season.

The start of Panathinaikos' 2016-17 campaign in all competitions proved far beyond the fans' expectations, as it was characterized by a poor run of results, including defeats to Olympiacos (0-3), Xanthi (1-2) and Ajax (1-2 at home and 0–2 away), and marked by the team's elimination from the UEFA Europa League group stage with only one point in the first five fixtures. As a result of increasing fan outrage, further aggravated after Panathinaikos' 2-1 Greek Cup defeat to OFI, chairman Giannis Alafouzos decided to terminate Stramaccioni's contract with the club on 1 December 2016, replacing him later that day with Marinos Ouzounidis.

=== Sparta Prague ===
On 28 May 2017, he joined Czech club Sparta Prague, signing a two-year contract. With Stramaccioni came his whole team of co-workers from previous clubs consisting of five nationalities. In July 2017, the club was eliminated in the third qualifying round of the UEFA Europa League after losing both matches against Red Star Belgrade (0-2 away and 0–1 at home). Three months later, Sparta were eliminated in the fourth round of the Czech Cup after losing at home (2–2 (aet) 2–4 (pen)) against Baník Ostrava. On 6 March 2018, Stramaccioni was sacked as the head coach of Sparta following "a disappointing start to the second part of the season and overall bad results this season".

=== Esteghlal ===
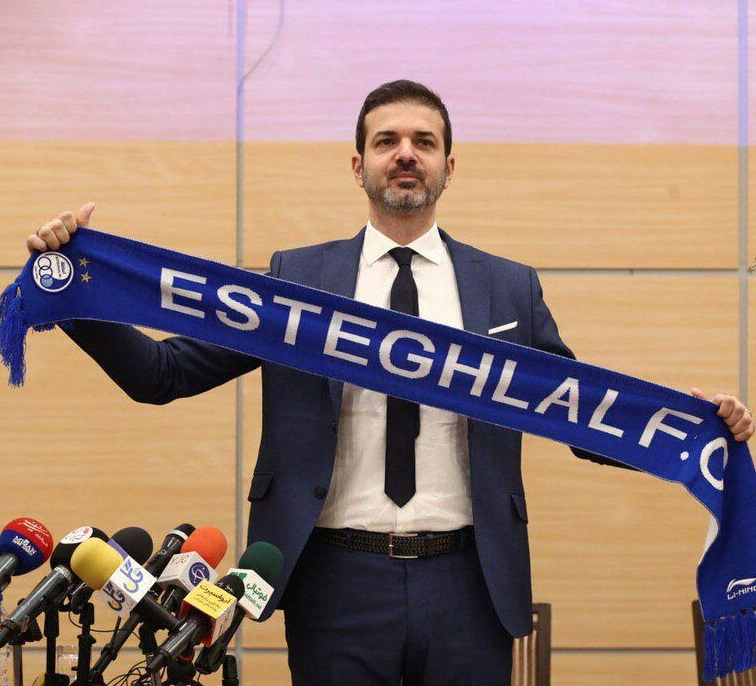
Stramaccioni with Esteghlal scarf in June 2019

On 13 June 2019, Stramaccioni was appointed as coach of Iranian club Esteghlal, signing a two-year contract. He later revealed in an interview that after having a conversation with former Iran national volleyball team coach Julio Velasco, he was convinced to accept a coaching job in Iran. Upon being appointed, Stramaccioni declared that Meysam Teymouri, Farshad Mohammadi Mehr, Armin Sohrabian, Rouhollah Bagheri and Reza Karimi were not part of his plans for the coming season. Instead, he requested to sign two former Serie A players, Cheick Diabaté and Hrvoje Milić.

Stramaccioni lost his first competitive game as Esteghlal's coach against Machine Sazi. On 28 December his team beat Tractor 4–2; with this victory, Esteghlal became the first team to reach over a total of 1000 points in all-time Persian Gulf Pro League table. On 8 December, Stramaccioni resigned as the manager of Esteghlal as the club failed to pay the wages of coaching staff due to the restrictions for transferring money outside Iran caused by the sanctions; Following his departure, many Esteghlal fans protested in front of the offices of Iran's Ministry of Sport and Youth which own the club in order to express their disagreements with the club's board of management and Stramaccioni's departure. On 2 January 2020, the club officially announced his departure from Esteghlal and the negotiations for his return were unsuccessful.

=== Al Gharafa ===
In July 2021, Stramaccioni took charge of Al Gharafa. On 31 October 2022, he was dismissed by Al Gharafa.

== Personal life ==
He is married to Dalila, an Instagram influencer, since 2011; they have four children together, the last one born in 2022 in Doha.

As an expert of international and Qatari football, Stramaccioni was hired by RAI as a color commentator for the 2022 FIFA World Cup; his first commentary, for the Argentina vs Saudi Arabia game, gained extensive coverage throughout social media for its intensity.

In 2023, he also joined DAZN as a color commentator for Serie A and European football games.

== Managerial statistics ==
As of match played 7 September 2021

| Team | From | To | Record | | | | |
| Team | From | To | G | W | D | L | Win % |
|---|---|---|---|---|---|---|---|
| Inter Milan | 26 March 2012 | 24 May 2013 | 65 | 31 | 11 | 23 | 47.69 |
| Udinese | 4 June 2014 | 30 June 2015 | 41 | 12 | 12 | 17 | 29.27 |
| Panathinaikos | 9 November 2015 | 1 December 2016 | 52 | 22 | 14 | 16 | 42.31 |
| Sparta Prague | 28 May 2017 | 6 March 2018 | 23 | 10 | 7 | 6 | 43.48 |
| Esteghlal | 13 June 2019 | 8 December 2019 | 15 | 9 | 4 | 2 | 60.00 |
| Al-Gharafa | 2 July 2021 | 31 October 2022 | 53 | 21 | 12 | 20 | 39.62 |
| Total | | | 275 | 115 | 71 | 89 | 41.82 |

== Honours ==
=== Managerial ===
Inter Milan

- NextGen Series: 2011–12
