= 2011–12 AC Cesena season =

Cesena
2011–12 season
- Chairman: (Italy) Igor Campedelli
- Manager: (Italy) Mario Beretta
- Serie A: 20th (relegated)
Home colours	Away colours	Third colours

The 2011–12 season was Cesena's second consecutive season in the top division of Italian football, the Serie A. The club finished the season in 20th position, leading to its relegation to Serie B for 2012–13.

== Serie A ==
Pos	Team	Pld	W	D	L	GF	GA	GD	Pts	Qualification or relegation
16	Palermo	38	11	10	17	52	62	−10	43 (Note: Cagliari finished ahead of Palermo on goal difference : Cagliari 2–1 Palermo, Palermo 3–2 Cagliari; Cagliari = –9, Palermo = –10.)	
17	Genoa	38	11	9	18	50	69	−19	42	
18	Lecce (R, D, R)	38	8	12	18	40	56	−16	36	Relegation to Serie C1 (Note: Lecce were originally relegated to Serie B, but further relegated to Lega Pro Prima Divisione due to involvement in the 2011–12 Italian football scandal.)
19	Novara (R)	38	7	11	20	35	65	−30	32	Relegation to Serie B
20	Cesena (R)	38	4	10	24	24	60	−36	22	Relegation to Serie B

Source: Lega Serie A
Rules for classification: 1) points; 2) head-to-head points; 3) head-to-head goal difference; 4) head-to-head goals scored; 5) goal difference; 6) number of goals scored
(D) Disqualified; (R) Relegated

=== Matches ===
28 August 2011 1	Atalanta	4–1	Cesena	Bergamo
20:45	Denis 17' (pen.); Marilungo 18', 44'; Carmona (yellow card) 24'; Peluso 71'	Summary	Candreva 12'; Guana (yellow card) 18'; Ghezzal (yellow card) 41'; Mutu (yellow card) 78'	Stadium: Stadio Atleti Azzurri d'Italia; Attendance: 6,423; Referee: Carmine Russo

10 September 2011 2	Cesena	1–3	Naples	Cesena
20:45	Guana 24'; Candreva (yellow card) 44'; Benalouane (yellow card) 52' (yellow-red card) 56'; Lauro (yellow card) 62'	Summary	Lavezzi 3', (yellow card) 57'; Santana (yellow card) 35'; Cannavaro (yellow card) 59'; Campagnaro 67'; Hamšík 87'	Stadium: Stadio Dino Manuzzi; Attendance: 20,942; Referee: Mauro Bergonzi

18 September 2011 3	Catania	1–0	Cesena	Catania
14:00	Potenza (yellow card) 19'; López 45+1' (pen.); Álvarez (yellow card) 75'; Delvecchio (yellow card) 77'; Biagianti (yellow card) 90+3'	Summary	Candreva (yellow card) 74'; Lauro (yellow card) 75'	Stadium: Stadio Angelo Massimino; Attendance: 12,270; Referee: Andrea Gervasoni

21 September 2011 4	Cesena	1–2	Lazio	Cesena
20:45	Mutu 15'; Rossi (yellow card) 47'; Parolo (yellow card) 51'; Comotto (yellow card) 79'	Summary	Hernanes (yellow card) 35', (goal) 48' (pen.); Klose 54'	Stadium: Stadio Dino Manuzzi; Attendance: 19,000; Referee: Domenico Celi

24 September 2011 5	Milan	1–0	Cesena	Milan
20:45	Seedorf 5', (yellow card) 66'; Taiwo (yellow card) 34'; Yepes (yellow card) 50'	Summary	Guana (yellow card) 20'	Stadium: San Siro; Attendance: 41,000; Referee: Antonio Giannoccaro

2 October 2011 6	Cesena	0–0	Chievo	Cesena
15:00	Guana (yellow card) 26'; Lauro (yellow card) 36'; Bogdani (yellow card) 52'; Ceccarelli (yellow card) 67'; Éder (yellow card) 88'	Summary	Hetemaj (yellow card) 22'; Cesar (yellow card) 61'; Sardo (yellow card) 66'	Stadium: Stadio Dino Manuzzi; Attendance: 16,000; Referee: Luca Banti

16 October 2011 7	Cesena	0–0	Fiorentina	Cesena
12:30	Ghezzal (yellow card) 68'; Mutu (red card) 74'; Ceccarelli (yellow card) 85'	Summary	Montolivo (yellow card) 70'; Cassani (yellow card) 74'; Ljajić (yellow card) 78'; Munari (yellow card) 80'	Stadium: Stadio Dino Manuzzi; Attendance: 22,000; Referee: Carmine Russo

23 October 2011 8	Siena	2–0	Cesena	Siena
14:00	González 9'; Rossettini (yellow card) 41'; Calaiò 53'	Summary	Candreva (yellow card) 74'	Stadium: Stadio Comunale Artemio Franchi; Attendance: 14,000; Referee: Nicola Rizzoli

26 October 2011 9	Cesena	1–1	Cagliari	Cesena
20:45	Guana (yellow card) 12'; Candreva 45+1' (pen.); Comotto (yellow card) 80'	Summary	Nenê 20' (pen.); Nainggolan (yellow card) 21'; Canini (yellow card) 45'; Conti (yellow card) 80'	Stadium: Stadio Dino Manuzzi; Attendance: 17,000; Referee: Daniele Doveri

30 October 2011 10	Parma	2–0	Cesena	Parma
14:00	Morrone (yellow card) 9'; Paletta 41'; Galloppa (yellow card) 60'; Lucarelli 71'	Summary	Guana (yellow card) 14'; Rodríguez (yellow card) 35'; Comotto (yellow card) 68'; Éder (yellow card) 70'	Stadium: Stadio Ennio Tardini; Attendance: 12,480; Referee: Marco Guida

6 November 2011 11	Cesena	0–1	Torino	Cesena
14:00	Parolo (yellow card) 71'	Summary	Carrozzieri (yellow card) 15'; Cuadrado 56'; Muriel (yellow card) 58' (yellow-red card) 58'	Stadium: Stadio Dino Manuzzi; Attendance: 14,000; Referee: Paolo Valeri

20 November 2011 12	Bologna	0–1	Cesena	Bologna
12:30	Pérez (yellow card) 19'; Mudingayi (yellow card) 62'; Raggi (yellow card) 67'	Summary	Lauro (yellow card) 25'; Von Bergen (yellow card) 28'; Parolo 84'; Ceccarelli (yellow card) 90+1'; Rossi (yellow card) 90+3'	Stadium: Stadio Renato Dall'Ara; Attendance: 20,397; Referee: Domenico Celi

27 November 2011 13	Cesena	2–0	Genoa	Cesena
15:00	Mutu 70' (pen.), 80'; Ravaglia (red card) 72'; Ceccarelli (yellow card) 83'; Bogdani (yellow card) 84'	Summary	Palacio (yellow card) 60'; Moretti (yellow card) 70'	Stadium: Stadio Dino Manuzzi; Attendance: 15,977; Referee: Nicola Rizzoli

4 December 2011 14	Juventus	2–0	Cesena	Turin
15:00	Marchisio 72'; Vidal 83' (pen.)	Summary	Ghezzal (yellow card) 15'; Rossi (yellow card) 28'; Antonioli (red card) 81'	Stadium: Juventus Arena; Attendance: 27,000; Referee: Daniele Doveri

10 December 2011 15	Palermo	0–1	Cesena	Palermo
20:45	Acquah (yellow card) 53'; Muñoz (yellow card) 61' (yellow-red card) 64'	Summary	Ghezzal (yellow card) 45'; Rodríguez (yellow card) 59'; Mutu 64'; Éder (yellow card) 73'; Rossi (yellow card) 75'	Stadium: Stadio Renzo Barbera; Attendance: 23,000; Referee: Giampaolo Calvarese

18 December 2011 16	Cesena	0–1	Inter Milan	Cesena
15:00	Comotto (yellow card) 13'; Lauro (yellow card) 62'	Summary	Ranocchia 63'	Stadium: Stadio Dino Manuzzi; Attendance: 20,138; Referee: Andrea Romeo

8 January 2012 17	Udinese	4–1	Cesena	Udine
12:30	Di Natale 1', 82'; Benatia (yellow card) 31'; Asamoah 54'; Basta 75'	Summary	Lauro (yellow card) 27' (yellow-red card) 61'; Éder 39'; Parolo (yellow card) 48'	Stadium: Stadio Friuli; Attendance: 18,000; Referee: Gabriele Gava

15 January 2012 18	Cesena	3–1	Novara	Cesena
15:00	Mutu 20', 39' (pen.); Guana (yellow card) 42'; Rinaudo 45' (o.g.); Von Bergen (yellow card) 78'	Summary	Dellafiore (yellow card) 5'; Rigoni (yellow card) 37'; Rinaudo (yellow card) 61'; Paci (yellow card) 69'; Morimoto 89'	Stadium: Stadio Dino Manuzzi; Attendance: 22,413; Referee: Paolo Valeri

21 January 2012 19	Roma	5–1	Cesena	Rome
18:00	Totti 1', 8'; Borini 9'; Juan 62'; Pjanić 70'	Summary	Éder 58'; Benalouane (yellow card) 77'	Stadium: Stadio Olimpico; Attendance: 36,000; Referee: Antonio Giannoccaro

29 January 2012 20	Cesena	0–1	Atalanta	Cesena
15:00	Rennella (yellow card) 41'; Guana (yellow card) 85'	Summary	Padoin (yellow card) 21'; Denis (yellow card) 25' (yellow-red card) 79'; Rossi 76' (o.g.); Raimondi (yellow card) 77'; Schelotto (yellow card) 83'	Stadium: Stadio Dino Manuzzi; Attendance: 15,315; Referee: Paolo Tagliavento

1 February 2012 21	Napoli	0–0	Cesena	Naples
20:45	Inler (yellow card) 35'; Hamšík (yellow card) 48'; Gargano (yellow card) 50'; Britos (yellow card) 54'; Džemaili (yellow card) 87'	Summary	Raphael Martinho (yellow card) 49'; Von Bergen (yellow card) 55'; Pudil (yellow card) 62'; Rodríguez (yellow card) 90'	Stadium: Stadio San Paolo; Attendance: 48,000; Referee: Luca Banti

9 February 2012 22	Lazio	3–2	Cesena	Rome
20:45	Konko (red card) 33'; Matuzalém (yellow card) 34'; Hernanes 53'; Lulić 61'; Kozák 63', (yellow card) 84'	Summary	Mutu 14', (yellow card) 73'; Iaquinta 35' (pen.); Comotto (yellow card) 62'; Del Nero (yellow card) 71'; Rennella (yellow card) 90'	Stadium: Stadio Olimpico; Attendance: 2,472; Referee: Andrea Romeo

19 February 2012 23	Cesena	1–3	Milan	Cesena
15:00	Benalouane (yellow card) 18'; Mutu (yellow card) 60'; Pudil 65'; Colucci (yellow card) 67'	Summary	Muntari (yellow card) 21', (goal) 29'; Emanuelson 31'; Robinho 55'	Stadium: Stadio Dino Manuzzi; Attendance: 20,021; Referee: Paolo Valeri

26 February 2012 24	Chievo	1–0	Cesena	Verona
15:00	Rigoni (yellow card) 11'; Vacek (yellow card) 18'; Pellissier (yellow card) 52'; Moscardelli 78'	Summary	Lauro (yellow card) 8' (yellow-red card) 56'; Iaquinta (yellow card) 36'; Pudil (yellow card) 66'; Guana (yellow card) 90+2'	Stadium: Stadio Marc'Antonio Bentegodi; Attendance: 11,000; Referee: Andrea De Marco

4 March 2012 26	Fiorentina	2–0	Cesena	Florence
15:00	Amauri (yellow card) 18'; Moras 61' (o.g.); Lazzari (yellow card) 66'; Nastasić 74'	Report	Moras (yellow card) 59'; Comotto (yellow card) 90+2'	Stadium: Stadio Artemio Franchi; Attendance: 26,834; Referee: Marco Guida

11 March 2012 27	Cesena	0–2	Siena	Cesena
15:00	Ceccarelli (red card) 73'; Moras (yellow card) 89'	Report	Brienza 75'; Del Grosso (yellow card) 79'; Bogdani 81'	Stadium: Stadio Dino Manuzzi; Attendance: 16,000; Referee: Antonio Damato

18 March 2012 28	Cagliari	3–0	Cesena	Cagliari
12:30	Pinilla 14', 45+1' (pen.), 57' (pen.); Canini (yellow card) 33'; Ribeiro (yellow card) 54'	Report	Colucci (yellow card) 42' (yellow-red card) 60'; Rossi (yellow card) 56' (yellow-red card) 78'	Stadium: Stadio Sant'Elia; Attendance: 9,500; Referee: Carmine Russo

25 March 2012 29	Cesena	2–2	Parma	Cesena
15:00	Santana 46'; Del Nero 53'; Moras (yellow card) 58'; Đoković (yellow card) 68'	Report	Paletta (yellow card) 24', (goal) 61'; Floccari 40'; Santacroce (yellow card) 83'	Stadium: Stadio Dino Manuzzi; Attendance: 14,919; Referee: Domenico Celi

1 April 2012 30	Torino	0–0	Cesena	Turin
15:00	Tomović (yellow card) 76'; Di Michele (yellow card) 84'; Cuadrado (yellow card) 90'	Report	Mutu (yellow card) 72'; Pudil (yellow card) 73'; Đoković (yellow card) 88'	Stadium: Stadio Olimpico Grande Torino; Attendance: 6,950; Referee: Luca Banti

7 April 2012 31	Cesena	0–0	Bologna	Cesena
15:00	Rennella (yellow card) 27'; Del Nero (yellow card) 34'; Comotto (yellow card) 90'; Colucci (yellow card) 90+4'	Report	Cherubin (yellow card) 69'; Mudingayi (yellow card) 81'; Acquafresca (yellow card) 90+4'	Stadium: Stadio Dino Manuzzi; Attendance: 16,497; Referee: Sebastiano Peruzzo

11 April 2012 32	Genoa	1–1	Cesena	Genoa
20:45	Rossi 41'; Mesto (yellow card) 75'; Moretti (yellow card) 90+1'	Report	Ceccarelli (yellow card) 65'; Mutu 76'	Stadium: Stadio Luigi Ferraris; Attendance: 21,000; Referee: Paolo Mazzoleni

22 April 2012 33	Cesena	2–2	Palermo	Cesena
15:00	Lauro (yellow card) 5'; Colucci (yellow card) 24'; Santana 26'; Rennella 28'; Mutu (yellow card) 90+4'	Report	Bertolo (yellow card) 15', (goal) 20'; Silvestre 45+2'	Stadium: Stadio Dino Manuzzi; Attendance: 13,932; Referee: Antonio Giannoccaro

25 April 2012 34	Cesena	0–1	Juventus	Cesena
18:00	Colucci (yellow card) 8'; Rennella (yellow card) 43'; Guana (yellow card) 64'; Moras (yellow card) 90+1'	Report	Vidal (yellow card) 33'; Pirlo (yellow card) 57'; Marti (yellow card) 62'; Borriello 80'	Stadium: Stadio Dino Manuzzi; Attendance: 16,000; Referee: Marco Guida

29 April 2012 35	Inter Milan	2–1	Cesena	Milan
15:00	Von Bergen 59' (o.g.); Zárate 72'	Report	Benalouane (yellow card) 42'; Ceccarelli 57'; Santana (yellow card) 62'	Stadium: San Siro; Attendance: 45,802; Referee: Andrea Romeo

6 May 2012 36	Cesena	0–1	Udinese	Cesena
20:45	Von Bergen (yellow card) 39'; Guana (yellow card) 63'	Report	Fabbrini 4'; Domizzi (yellow card) 20'	Stadium: Stadio Dino Manuzzi; Attendance: 16,000; Referee: Antonio Damato

12 May 2012 37	Novara	3–0	Cesena	Novara
15:00	Rigoni 28' (pen.), 68' (pen.), 86'; Mascara (yellow card) 41'; Morganella (yellow card) 90'	Report	Guana (yellow card) 58'; Antonioli (yellow card) 90'	Stadium: Stadio Silvio Piola; Attendance: 8,000; Referee: Filippo Merchiori

18 May 2012 38	Cesena	2–3	Roma	Cesena
15:00	Del Nero 9', (yellow card) 20'; Santana 90'	Report	Bojan 27'; Lamela 32'; De Rossi 49'	Stadium: Stadio Dino Manuzzi; Attendance: 14,883; Referee: Carmine Russo

== Coppa Italia ==
21 August 2011 3	Cesena	1–0 (a.e.t.)	Ascoli	Cesena
20:30	Bogdani 119'	Report		Stadium: Stadio Dino Manuzzi; Attendance: 1,439; Referee: Andrea Romeo

30 November 2011 4	Cesena	3–0	Gubbio	Cesena
15:00	Bogdani 11' (pen.); Ricci (yellow card) 21'; Benalouane 68'; Candreva 90'	Report		Stadium: Stadio Dino Manuzzi; Attendance: 1,704; Referee: Antonio Giannoccaro

12 January 2012 Last 16	Napoli	2–1	Cesena	Naples
21:00	Cavani (yellow card) 45+2', (goal) 65'; Pandev 86'	Report	Popescu 20'	Stadium: Stadio San Paolo; Attendance: 28,082; Referee: Daniele Doveri

== Players ==
=== Current squad ===
As of 10 September 2011

Note: Flags indicate national team as defined under FIFA eligibility rules; some limited exceptions apply. Players may hold more than one non-FIFA nationality.

No.	Pos.	Nation	Player
1	GK	ITA	Francesco Antonioli
2	DF	URU	Guillermo Rodríguez
3	DF	LAT	Aleksejs Giļničs
4	DF	ITA	Luca Ricci
5	MF	ITA	Roberto Guana
6	DF	ITA	Maurizio Lauro
7	FW	BRA	Éder
8	MF	ITA	Antonio Candreva (on loan from Udinese)
9	MF	PAR	David Meza
10	FW	ROU	Adrian Mutu
11	FW	ITA	Vincenzo Rennella (on loan from Genoa)
13	DF	ITA	Marco Rossi
14	MF	ITA	Giuseppe Colucci (captain)
15	MF	BRA	Raphael Martinho (on loan from Catania)

No.	Pos.	Nation	Player
16	DF	ITA	Gianluca Comotto
17	FW	FRA	Dominique Malonga
18	MF	ITA	Marco Parolo
22	MF	SWE	Tibor Čiča
25	DF	SUI	Steve von Bergen
28	DF	TUN	Yohan Benalouane
29	FW	CRO	Marko Livaja
32	FW	ALG	Abdelkader Ghezzal (on loan from Bari)
55	MF	URU	Jorge Martínez (on loan from Juventus)
70	FW	ALB	Erjon Bogdani
71	DF	ROU	Ştefan Popescu
77	DF	ITA	Luca Ceccarelli
86	GK	SMR	Aldo Simoncini
88	GK	ITA	Nicola Ravaglia

== Transfers ==
=== In ===
No.	Pos.	Nat.	Name	Age	EU	Moving from	Type	Transfer window	Ends	Transfer fee	Source
	FW	(France)	Rennella	22	EU	Genoa	Loan	Summer		Loan transfer	
	MF	(Italy)	Garritano	17	EU	Inter Milan	Transfer	Summer		Co-ownership	
	DF	(Italy)	Caldirola	20	EU	Inter Milan	Transfer	Summer		Co-ownership	
	FW	(Romania)	Mutu	32	EU	Fiorentina	Transfer	Summer		Free	
	DF	(Italy)	Rossi	23	EU	Parma	Transfer	Summer		Co-ownership	
	MF	(Italy)	Candreva	24	EU	Udinese	Loan	Summer		Loan transfer	

=== Out ===
No.	Pos.	Nat.	Name	Age	EU	Moving to	Type	Transfer window	Transfer fee	Source
	DF	(Japan)	Nagatomo	24	Non-EU	Inter Milan	Transfer	Summer	Undisclosed plus Garritano and Caldirola (loaned)	
	GK	(Italy)	Teodorani	19	EU	SPAL	Loan	Summer	Loan transfer	
	DF	(Italy)	Casolla	19	EU	San Marino	Loan	Summer	Loan transfer	

EU = if holds or not a European Union passport; Country: when 2 flags, 1st flag = country that plays for internationally, 2nd flag = country of birth; N = number on jersey; P = Position (for position name, pause mouse pointer on abbreviation); Name = Name on jersey (for more extensive name, pause mouse pointer on name); Age = age on the day of the signing; Moving from = only indicate the club the player was playing before start playing for this club in this season, for the type of the moving see Status column; Moving to = only indicates the club the player is going to play next, for the type of the moving see Status column; Ends = when the player's current contract ends; n/a = Not applicable.
