= 2011–12 Inter Milan season =

Internazionale
2011–12 season
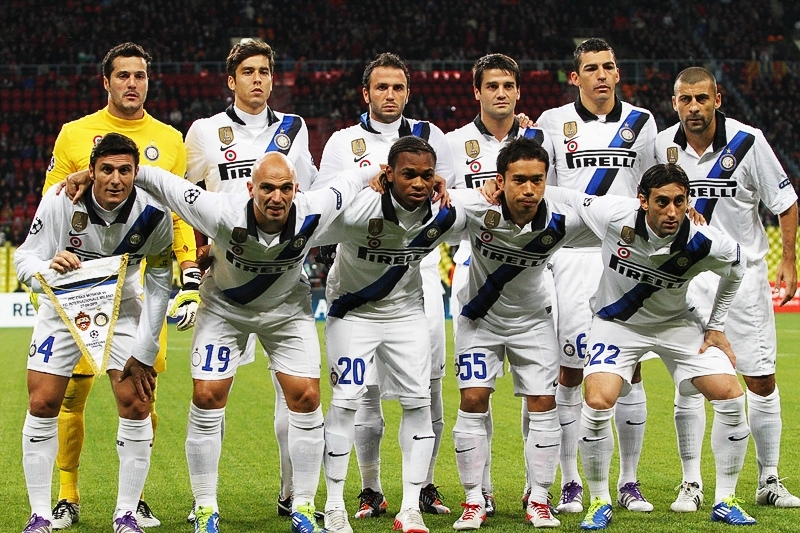
- Inter Milan players line up before facing CSKA Moscow in the UEFA Champions League, 27 September 2011
- President: Massimo Moratti
- Head coach: Gian Piero Gasperini (until 21 September 2011); Claudio Ranieri (until 26 March 2012); Andrea Stramaccioni (from 26 March 2012)
- Stadium: San Siro
- Serie A: 6th
- Supercoppa Italiana: Runners-up
- Coppa Italia: Quarter-finals
- UEFA Champions League: Round of 16
- Top goalscorer: League: Diego Milito (24); All: Diego Milito (26)
- Highest home attendance: 78,222 vs. Milan (6 May 2012)
- Lowest home attendance: 12,823 vs. Genoa (19 January 2012)
- Average home league attendance: 42,860
Home colours	Away colours

The 2011–12 season was Football Club Internazionale Milano's 103rd in existence and 96th consecutive season in the top flight of Italian football. The team competed for the 10th consecutive season in the Champions League, breaking a record for Italian clubs.

== Season overview ==
Massimo Moratti bets on Gian Piero Gasperini, the coach who in 2009 led Genoa to a comeback in UEFA competitions after 20 years. Other hopes have the faces and names of Ricky Álvarez - a winger - and Diego Forlán, a centre-forward bought in order to replace Samuel Eto'o, flown in Russia. Gasperini makes his official debut in Supercoppa Italiana, losing 2–1 to Milan and wasting the only seasonal chance to win a trophy. He is sacked in late September, due to a bad start in domestic league: Inter is defeated by Palermo and Novara, collecting just a draw with Roma.

Claudio Ranieri takes his place, but is not - at least in first weeks - luckier. Inter wins for the first time at home in October, beating Chievo 1–0. Between December 2011 and January 2012, anyway, the side manages to get a notable comeback: it includes 7 consecutive wins in league, and 8 overall. When this streak is stopped, however, Inter goes on the other extreme and, from 25 January to March 4, never wins a game. In the match against Catania Nerazzurri are losing 2–0 when, encouraged by their fans, manage to recover the gap for a 2–2 final. In the next matchday, the side returns to win: once again, Chievo is the «victim». Ranieri bursts into tears after the match, tears that will be of pain when - 4 days after - Olympique Marseille knocks Inter out of Champions League. Ranieri leads the team for other only 2 matches, being sacked after the 2–0 suffered from Juventus: it was the first derby of Italy hosted in Juventus Stadium. The third, and last, seasonal coach is Andrea Stramaccioni (aged 36): collecting 17 points in 9 final games, he manages to reach a sixth place and the preliminaries of Europa League as result of a hard season.

== Kit ==
Home	Home Alt.	Home Alt. 2	Home Alt. 3	Away	Away Alt.	Goalkeeper 1	Goalkeeper 2

Type	Shirt	Shorts	Socks	Info
Home	Black / Blue	Black	Black	
Home Alt.	Black / Blue	White	White	Serie A, Match 2, September 11 against Palermo
Home Alt. 2	Black / Blue	White	Black	Serie A, Match 16, December 18 against Cesena
Home Alt. 3	Black / Blue	Black	White	2011 Supercoppa Italiana, August 6 against Milan
Away	White	White	White	
Away	White	Black	White	Serie A, Match 5, September 24 against Bologna

== Players ==
=== Squad information ===
As of 13 May 2012

Squad no.	Name	Nationality	Position	Date of birth (age)
Goalkeepers
1	Júlio César	(Brazil)	GK	3 September 1979 (aged 32)
12	Luca Castellazzi	(Italy)	GK	19 July 1975 (aged 36)
21	Paolo Orlandoni	(Italy)	GK	12 August 1972 (aged 39)
Defenders
2	Iván Córdoba (vice-Captain)	(Colombia)	CB	11 August 1976 (aged 35)
4	Javier Zanetti (Captain)	(Argentina)	RB / CM / RM	10 August 1973 (aged 38)
6	Lúcio	(Brazil)	CB	8 May 1978 (aged 34)
13	Maicon	(Brazil)	RB	26 July 1981 (aged 30)
23	Andrea Ranocchia	(Italy)	CB	16 February 1988 (aged 24)
25	Walter Samuel	(Argentina)	CB	23 March 1978 (aged 34)
26	Cristian Chivu	(Romania)	LB / CB / DM	26 October 1980 (aged 31)
37	Davide Faraoni	(Italy)	RB	25 October 1991 (aged 20)
40	Juan Jesus	(Brazil)	CB / LB	10 June 1991 (aged 21)
55	Yuto Nagatomo	(Japan)	LB / RB / LM	12 September 1986 (aged 25)
Midfielders
5	Dejan Stanković	(Serbia)	CM / AM	11 September 1978 (aged 33)
10	Wesley Sneijder	(Netherlands)	AM / CM / LW	9 June 1984 (aged 28)
11	Ricky Álvarez	(Argentina)	AM / SS / CM	12 April 1988 (aged 24)
14	Fredy Guarín	(Colombia)	CM / DM / AM	30 June 1986 (aged 25)
17	Angelo Palombo	(Italy)	DM / CM / CB	25 September 1981 (aged 30)
18	Andrea Poli	(Italy)	CM / DM / AM	29 September 1989 (aged 22)
19	Esteban Cambiasso	(Argentina)	DM / CM	18 August 1980 (aged 31)
20	Joel Obi	(Nigeria)	CM / LM / RM	22 May 1991 (aged 21)
Forwards
7	Giampaolo Pazzini	(Italy)	CF	2 August 1984 (aged 27)
9	Diego Forlán	(Uruguay)	CF	19 May 1979 (aged 33)
22	Diego Milito	(Argentina)	CF	12 June 1979 (aged 33)
28	Mauro Zárate	(Argentina)	CF / SS / AM	13 March 1987 (aged 25)
30	Luc Castaignos	(Netherlands)	CF	27 September 1992 (aged 19)

==== Youth-squad players ====
Note: Flags indicate national team as defined under FIFA eligibility rules; some limited exceptions apply. Players may hold more than one non-FIFA nationality.

No.	Pos.	Nation	Player
33	DF	SEN	Ibrahima Mbaye
41	MF	GHA	Alfred Duncan
44	DF	ITA	Matteo Bianchetti
48	MF	ITA	Lorenzo Crisetig
81	FW	ITA	Samuele Longo

No.	Pos.	Nation	Player
88	FW	CRO	Marko Livaja
91	GK	ITA	Raffaele Di Gennaro
93	MF	ITA	Daniel Bessa
94	MF	ITA	Andrea Romanò

== Transfers ==
=== Summer ===
==== In ====
No.	Pos.	Name	Age	Moving From	Type of Transfer	Ends	Notes	Transfer fee	Source
9	CF	(Uruguay) Diego Forlán	32	(Spain) Atlético Madrid	Full ownership	2013	N/A	€5,000,000	
16	DF	(Italy) Luca Caldirola	20	(Italy) Primavera	Promoted	20??	N/A	Free	
48	MF	(Italy) Lorenzo Crisetig	18	(Italy) Primavera	Promoted	2014	N/A	Free	
55	DF	(Japan) Yuto Nagatomo	24	(Italy) Cesena	Permanent move	2016	Transfer fee plus co-ownership of Caldirola and Garritano	€4,500,000	inter.it
30	FW	(Netherlands) Luc Castaignos	18	(Netherlands) Feyenoord	Full ownership	2016	N/A	€1,500,000	feyenoord.nl
33	GK	(Italy) Emiliano Viviano	25	(Italy) Bologna	Co-ownership solved	N/A	N/A	€4,100,000	football-italia.net
11	MF	(Argentina) Ricky Álvarez	23	(Argentina) Vélez Sársfield	Full ownership	2016	N/A	€11,900,000	inter.it
42	DF	(Brazil) Jonathan	25	(Brazil) Santos	Full ownership	2015	N/A	€5,000,000	inter.it
18	MF	(Italy) Andrea Poli	21	(Italy) Sampdoria	Loan	2012	Option to buy	€1,000,000	
28	FW	(Argentina) Mauro Zárate	24	(Italy) Lazio	Loan	2013	Option to buy	€2,700,000	

==== Out ====
Pos.	Name	Age	Moving to	Type of Transfer	Notes	Transfer fee	Source
DF	(Italy) Marco Materazzi	37	Retirement	Contract Termination	Summer	Free	
MF	(Morocco) Houssine Kharja	28	(Italy) Genoa	Loan ended	Summer	Free	
DF	(Colombia) Nelson Rivas	28	N/A	Contract Termination	Summer	Free	
FW	(Honduras) David Suazo	31	(Italy) Catania	End of contract	Summer	Free	
FW	(Nigeria) Victor Obinna	24	(Russia) Lokomotiv Moscow	End of contract	Summer	Free	fclm.ru
DF	(Italy) Cristiano Biraghi	18	(Italy) Juve Stabia	Loan	Summer	Free	inter.it
MF	(Kenya) McDonald Mariga	24	(Spain) Real Sociedad	Loan	Summer	€1,500,000	
FW	(North Macedonia) Goran Pandev	28	(Italy) Napoli	Loan	Summer	€1,500,000	
DF	(Italy) Davide Santon	20	(England) Newcastle United	Full ownership	Summer	€5,650,000	
FW	(Cameroon) Samuel Eto'o	30	(Russia) Anzhi Makhachkala	Transfer	Full ownership	€27,000,000	

==== In/out ====
No.	Pos.	Name	Age	Moving From	Transfer 1	Transfer fee 1	Moving To	Transfer 2	Transfer fee 2	Source
-	GK	(Slovenia) Vid Belec	21	(Italy) Crotone	Loan return	Free	(Italy) Crotone	Loan	Free	inter.it
-	FW	(Italy) Aiman Napoli	22	(Italy) Modena	Loan return	Free	(Italy) Juve Stabia	Loan	Free	inter.it

Total spending: ▼€35,700,000

Total income: ▲€35,650,000

Net Income: ▼€50,000

=== Winter ===
==== In ====
No.	Pos.	Name	Age	Moving From	Type of Transfer	Ends	Notes	Transfer fee	Source
13	MF	(Colombia) Fredy Guarín	25	(Portugal) Porto	Loan, option to buy	N/A	N/A	€1,500,000	
17	MF	(Italy) Angelo Palombo	30	(Italy) Sampdoria	Loan, option to buy	N/A	N/A	€1,000,000	
40	DF	(Brazil) Juan Jesus	20	(Brazil) Internacional	Full ownership	N/A	N/A	€3,800,000	

Total spending: ▼€6,300,000

==== Out ====
Pos.	Name	Age	Moving to	Type of Transfer	Notes	Transfer fee	Source
DF	(Brazil) Jonathan	25	(Italy) Parma	Loan	N/A	Undisclosed	
GK	(Italy) Emiliano Viviano	26	(Italy) Palermo	Co-ownership	N/A	Free	
MF	(Brazil) Philippe Coutinho	19	(Spain) Espanyol	Loan	N/A	Free	
MF	(Ghana) Sulley Muntari	27	(Italy) Milan	Loan	N/A	Free	
MF	(Italy) Thiago Motta	29	(France) Paris Saint-Germain	Transfer	N/A	€11,500,000	

Total income: ▲€11,500,000

Net Income: ▲€5,200,000

Season Net Income: ▲€5,150,000

== Club ==
=== Non-playing staff ===
Position	Staff
Coach	(Italy) Andrea Stramaccioni
Vice Coach	(Italy) Giuseppe Baresi
Technical Assistant	(Italy) Massimiliano Catini
Chief Of Fitness Coaches	(Italy) Stefano Rapetti
Fitness Coach	(Italy) Federico Pannoncini
Goalkeeper Coach	(Italy) Alessandro Nista
Match Analyst	(Italy) Michele Salzarulo
Chief Of Medical Staff	(Italy) Franco Combi
Doctor	(Italy) Giorgio Panico
Rehabilitation Coach	(Italy) Andrea Scannavino
Rehabilitation Coach	(Italy) Maurizio Fanchini
Masseur/Physiotherapist	(Italy) Marco Dellacasa
Masseur/Physiotherapist	(Italy) Massimo Dellacasa
Masseur/Physiotherapist	(Italy) Luigi Sessolo
Rehabilitation Staff	(Italy) Andrea Galli
Rehabilitation Staff	(Italy) Alberto Galbiati
Technical Director	(Italy) Marco Branca
Sporting Director	(Italy) Piero Ausilio

Last updated: 15 May 2012
Source: inter.it

== Pre-season and friendlies ==
14 July 2011 Friendly	Trentino Team	1–6	Internazionale	Pinzolo
17:00 CEST	Mariotti 44'	Report	Pazzini 13'; Eto'o 27'; Álvarez 46'; Pandev 59'; Castaignos 82'; Longo 89'	Stadium: Stadio Pineta; Attendance: 5,000; Referee: Manuel Barozzi

17 July 2011 Friendly	Mezzocorona	1–6	Internazionale	Pinzolo
17:00 CEST	Timpone 64'	Report	Pandev 2', 41'; Eto'o 9'; Sneijder 25'; Álvarez 33', 54'	Stadium: Stadio Pineta; Attendance: >6,000; Referee: Valente

20 July 2011 Friendly	Cremonese	1–4	Internazionale	Rovereto
17:00 CEST		Report	Eto'o 17', 70'; Pazzini 57'; Faraoni 88'	Stadium: Stadio Querica; Referee: Previtera

24 July 2011 Friendly	Galatasaray	0–0	Internazionale	Bochum
18:00 CET	Elmander (yellow card) 46'; Gülselam (yellow card) 79'	Report		Stadium: Ruhrstadion; Referee: Guido Winkmann

30 July 2011 Dublin Super Cup	Celtic	0–2	Internazionale	Dublin
16:30 BST	Brown (yellow card) 48'; Cha Du-ri (yellow card) 51'	Report	Castaignos 7'; Motta (yellow card) 11' (yellow-red card) 44'; Stanković (yellow card) 16'; Pazzini 45+1'; Faraoni (yellow card) 51'	Stadium: Aviva Stadium; Referee: Damien Hancock

31 July 2011 Dublin Super Cup	Manchester City	3–0	Internazionale	Dublin
16:30 BST	Balotelli 45+1'; Dzeko 47'; Johnson 90+3'	Report		Stadium: Aviva Stadium; Referee: Dave McKeon

18 August 2011 TIM Trophy	Internazionale	1–1 (7–6 p)	Juventus	Bari
20:45 CEST	Ranocchia 16'	Report	Vucinic 9'	Stadium: Stadio San Nicola
	Penalties
	Pazzini (penalty scored); Motta (penalty scored); Pandev (penalty missed); Sneijder (penalty scored); Stanković (penalty scored); Ranocchia (penalty scored); Samuel (penalty scored)		Del Piero (penalty scored); Pasquato (penalty missed); Bonucci (penalty scored); Vučinić (penalty scored); Pirlo (penalty scored); Lichtsteiner (penalty scored); Barzagli (penalty missed)

18 August 2011 TIM Trophy	Internazionale	1–0	Milan	Bari
20:45 CEST	Milito 28'	Report		Stadium: Stadio San Nicola

21 August 2011 Friendly	Olympiacos	2–2	Internazionale	Geneva
18:00 CEST	Feisa 46'; Modesto 68'; Mellbourg (red card) 27'		Pazzini 76', 89'	Stadium: Stade de Genève

27 August 2011 Friendly	Internazionale	2–3	Chievo	Monza
20:45 CEST	Milito 48'; Samuel (yellow card) 81'; Faraoni (yellow card) 88'; Pazzini 90+4'	Report	Théréau 51'; Moscardelli 70', 90+3'; Hetemaj (yellow card) 77'; Vacek (yellow card) 82'; Mandelli (yellow card) 83'	Stadium: Stadio Brianteo; Attendance: 8,000; Referee: Gallione

== Competitions ==
=== Overview ===
Competition	First match	Last match	Starting round	Final position	Record							
Competition	First match	Last match	Starting round	Final position	Pld	W	D	L	GF	GA	GD	Win %
Serie A	28 August 2011	13 May 2012	Matchday 1	6th	38	17	7	14	58	55	+3	44.74
Coppa Italia	19 January 2012	25 January 2012	Round of 16	Quarter-finals	2	1	0	1	2	3	−1	50.00
Supercoppa Italiana	6 August 2011		Final	Runners-up	1	0	0	1	1	2	−1	0.00
Champions League	14 September 2011	22 May 2010	Group stage	Round of 16	8	4	1	3	10	9	+1	50.00
Total					49	22	8	19	71	69	+2	44.90

Last updated: 13 May 2012
Source: Serie A statistics, Coppa Italia statistics, UEFA Champions League statistics

=== Serie A ===
==== League table ====
Pos	Team	Pld	W	D	L	GF	GA	GD	Pts	Qualification or relegation
4	Lazio	38	18	8	12	56	47	+9	62	Qualification to Europa League play-off round
5	Napoli	38	16	13	9	66	46	+20	61	Qualification to Europa League group stage (Note: Napoli qualified to the group stage of the Europa League as winner of the 2011–12 Coppa Italia. As they finished fifth, the sixth-placed team of the league also qualified for the Europa League.)
6	Internazionale	38	17	7	14	58	55	+3	58	Qualification to Europa League third qualifying round
7	Roma	38	16	8	14	60	54	+6	56 (Note: Roma finished ahead of Parma on head–to–head away goals scored: Parma 0–1 Roma, Roma 1–0 Parma.)	
8	Parma	38	15	11	12	54	53	+1	56	

Source: Lega Serie A
Rules for classification: 1) points; 2) head-to-head points; 3) head-to-head goal difference; 4) head-to-head goals scored; 5) goal difference; 6) number of goals scored

==== Results summary ====
Overall								Home						Away					
Pld	W	D	L	GF	GA	GD	Pts	W	D	L	GF	GA	GD	W	D	L	GF	GA	GD
38	17	7	14	58	55	+3	58	10	4	5	36	27	+9	7	3	9	22	28	−6

Last updated: 13 May 2012.
Source: Internazionale Milano

==== Results by round ====
Round	1	2	3	4	5	6	7	8	9	10	11	12	13	14	15	16	17	18	19	20	21	22	23	24	25	26	27	28	29	30	31	32	33	34	35	36	37	38
Ground	H	A	H	A	A	H	A	H	A	H	A	H	A	H	H	A	H	A	H	A	H	A	H	H	A	H	A	H	A	H	A	H	A	A	H	A	H	A
Result	W	L	D	L	W	L	L	W	D	L	W	W	W	L	W	W	W	W	W	L	D	L	L	L	L	D	W	D	L	W	D	W	D	W	W	L	W	L
Position	5	14	11	18	16	17	17	16	16	17	16	16	15	10	7	5	5	5	4	5	5	5	5	7	7	7	7	7	8	7	7	7	7	7	5	6	6	6

Updated to match(es) played on 13 May 2012. Source: Competitive Matches
A = Away; H = Home; W = Win; D = Draw; L = Loss

==== Matches ====
Kickoff times are in CET.

Win Draw Loss Postponed

11 September 2011 2	Palermo	4–3	Internazionale	Palermo
21:45 CET	Miccoli 48', 86'; Hernández 54'; Acquah (yellow card) 61'; Pinilla 88' (yellow card) 88'	Report	Samuel (yellow card) 27'; Milito 33', 51' (pen.); Júlio César (yellow card) 48'; Zanetti (yellow card) 59'; Forlán 90+2'	Stadium: Renzo Barbera; Attendance: 36,000; Referee: Christian Brighi

17 September 2011 3	Internazionale	0–0	Roma	Milan
20:45 CET	Lúcio (yellow card) 16'	Report	Kjær (yellow card) 83'	Stadium: San Siro; Attendance: 47,944; Referee: Paolo Silvio Mazzoleni

20 September 2011 4	Novara	3–1	Internazionale	Novara
20:45 CET	Meggiorini 38'; Dellafiore (yellow card) 61'; Rigoni 86' (pen.), 90+1'	Report	Chivu (yellow card) 28'; Pazzini (yellow card) 60'; Obi (yellow card) 62'; Lúcio (yellow card) 84'; Ranocchia (red card) 85'; Cambiasso 89'	Stadium: Silvio Piola; Attendance: 15,596; Referee: Mauro Bergonzi

24 September 2011 5	Bologna	1–3	Internazionale	Bologna
18:00 CET	Pérez (yellow card) 61'; Diamanti 66' (pen.); Morleo (red card) 80'; Krhin (yellow card) 86'	Report	Coutinho (yellow card) 35'; Pazzini 39'; Milito 81' (pen.); Lúcio 87'	Stadium: Renato Dall'Ara; Attendance: 22,467; Referee: Paolo Tagliavento

1 October 2011 6	Internazionale	0–3	Napoli	Milan
20:45 CET	Obi (yellow card) 10' (yellow-red card) 41'; Chivu (yellow card) 37'; Zanetti (yellow card) 45'; Júlio César (yellow card) 45+1'	Report	Zúñiga (yellow card) 28'; Campagnaro 43'; Maggio 56'; Mascara (yellow card) 73'; Hamšík 75'	Stadium: San Siro; Attendance: 64,824; Referee: Gianluca Rocchi

15 October 2011 7	Catania	2–1	Internazionale	Catania
18:00 CET	Spolli (yellow card) 43'; Almirón 46'; Lodi 50' (pen.); Delvecchio (yellow card) 79'; Bellusci (yellow card) 90+4'	Report	Cambiasso 6'; Castellazzi (yellow card) 50'; Zárate (yellow card) 71'	Stadium: Angelo Massimino; Attendance: 19,504; Referee: Daniele Orsato

23 October 2011 8	Internazionale	1–0	Chievo	Milan
15:00 CET	Motta (yellow card) 31', (goal) 34'; Maicon (yellow card) 43'	Report	Jokić (yellow card) 35'; Vacek (yellow card) 55'	Stadium: San Siro; Attendance: 48,058; Referee: Domenico Celi

26 October 2011 9	Atalanta	1–1	Internazionale	Bergamo
20:45 CET	Moralez (yellow card) 42'; Denis 44'; Schelotto (yellow card) 59'	Report	Stanković (yellow card) 17'; Sneijder 32'; Chivu (yellow card) 40'	Stadium: Stadio Atleti Azzurri d'Italia; Attendance: 19,613; Referee: Paolo Valeri

29 October 2011 10	Internazionale	1–2	Juventus	Milan
20:45 CET	Maicon 28'; Chivu (yellow card) 59'; Sneijder (yellow card) 65'	Report	Vučinić 12'; Bonucci (yellow card) 22'; Marchisio 33'; Vidal (yellow card) 45'; Chiellini (yellow card) 54'; Pepe (yellow card) 55'; Pirlo (yellow card) 67'	Stadium: San Siro; Attendance: 78,072; Referee: Nicola Rizzoli

13 December 2011 11	Genoa	0–1	Internazionale	Genoa
20:45 CET	Kaladze (yellow card) 57'; Pratto (yellow card) 73'	Report	Álvarez (yellow card) 61'; Nagatomo 67'	Stadium: Luigi Ferraris; Attendance: 23,708; Referee: Luca Banti

19 November 2011 12	Internazionale	2–1	Cagliari	Milan
18:00 CET	Motta 54'; Coutinho 60'; Álvarez (yellow card) 86'	Report	Conti (yellow card) 30'; Pisano (yellow card) 54'; Larrivey 88'	Stadium: San Siro; Attendance: 45,289; Referee: Antonio Damato

27 November 2011 13	Siena	0–1	Internazionale	Siena
15:00 CET	Terzi (yellow card) 38'; Brienza (yellow card) 80' (yellow-red card) 90+1'; Mannini (yellow card) 90+4'	Report	Ranocchia (yellow card) 14'; Stanković (yellow card) 88'; Castaignos 89'	Stadium: Artemio Franchi; Attendance: 13,587; Referee: Andrea De Marco

3 December 2011 14	Internazionale	0–1	Udinese	Milan
20:45 CET	Motta (yellow card) 82'; Zanetti (yellow card) 47' (yellow-red card) 85'; Pazzini (penalty missed) 89'	Report	Armero (yellow card) 63'; Isla 73'; Pinzi (yellow card) 84'; Di Natale (penalty missed) 86'; Ferronetti (yellow card) 88' (yellow-red card) 90'	Stadium: San Siro; Attendance: 42,122; Referee: Andrea Gervasoni

10 December 2011 15	Internazionale	2–0	Fiorentina	Milan
20:45 CET	Maicon (yellow card) 38'; Pazzini 41'; Nagatomo 49'	Report	Gamberini (yellow card) 50'	Stadium: San Siro; Attendance: 39,917; Referee: Paolo Tagliavento

18 December 2011 16	Cesena	0–1	Internazionale	Cesena
15:00 CET	Comotto (yellow card) 13'; Lauro (yellow card) 62'	Report	Ranocchia 63'	Stadium: Stadio Dino Manuzzi; Attendance: 20,138; Referee: Andrea Romeo

21 December 2011 1	Internazionale	4–1	Lecce	Milan
20:45 CET	Pazzini 34'; Milito 49'; Cambiasso 73'; Álvarez 81'; Maicon (yellow card) 86'	Report	Muriel 19'; Obodo (yellow card) 30'; Pasquato (yellow card) 87'	Stadium: San Siro; Attendance: 39,602; Referee: Marco Guida

7 January 2012 17	Internazionale	5–0	Parma	Milan
20:45 CET	Milito 13', 41'; Motta 18'; Samuel (yellow card) 23'; Pazzini 56'; Faraoni 79'	Report	Galloppa (yellow card) 31'	Stadium: San Siro; Attendance: 47,326; Referee: Antonio Danilo Giannoccaro

15 January 2012 18	Milan	0–1	Internazionale	Milan
20:45 CET	Boateng (yellow card) 64'; Nesta (yellow card) 68'; El Shaarawy (yellow card) 90+2'	Report	Milito 54'; Motta (yellow card) 89'	Stadium: San Siro; Attendance: 80,000; Referee: Daniele Orsato

22 January 2012 19	Internazionale	2–1	Lazio	Milan
20:45 CET	Milito 44'; Pazzini 63'	Report	Dias (yellow card) 2'; Rocchi 30'	Stadium: San Siro; Attendance: 52,000; Referee: Nicola Rizzoli

29 January 2012 20	Lecce	1–0	Internazionale	Lecce
15:00 CET	Giacomazzi 40'; Cuadrado (yellow card) 43'; Muriel (yellow card) 68'; Olivera (yellow card) 78'	Report		Stadium: Stadio Via del Mare; Attendance: 10,000; Referee: Luca Banti

1 February 2012 21	Internazionale	4–4	Palermo	Milan
20:45 CET	Milito 22', 55' (pen.), 61', 65'; Obi (yellow card) 83'; Ranocchia (yellow card) 90'	Report	Mantovani 16'; Miccoli 52', 66', 85'; Muñoz (yellow card) 54'	Stadium: San Siro; Attendance: 18,320; Referee: Marco Guida

5 February 2012 22	Roma	4–0	Internazionale	Rome
15:00 CET	Juan 13' (yellow card) 85'; Borini 41', 48'; Bojan 89'; De Rossi (yellow card) 10'; Taddei (yellow card) 75'	Report	Maicon (yellow card) 11'; Faraoni (yellow card) 70'	Stadium: Stadio Olimpico; Attendance: 33,000; Referee: Andrea De Marco

12 February 2012 23	Internazionale	0–1	Novara	Milan
15:00 CET		Report	Radovanović (yellow card) 44' (yellow-red card) 80'; Caracciolo 56'; Morganella (yellow card) 79'; Porcari (yellow card) 90'	Stadium: San Siro; Attendance: 21,703; Referee: Carmine Russo

17 February 2012 24	Internazionale	0–3	Bologna	Milan
20:45 CET	Sneijder (yellow card) 40'	Report	Diamanti (yellow card) 31'; Di Vaio 37', 38'; Acquafresca 85'	Stadium: San Siro; Attendance: 20,043; Referee: Antonio Damato

26 February 2012 25	Napoli	1–0	Internazionale	Naples
19:00 CET	Gargano (yellow card) 18'; Lavezzi 59'; Aronica (red card) 79'	Report	Nagatomo (yellow card) 13'; Milito (yellow card) 45'; Córdoba (yellow card) 67'; Faraoni (yellow card) 70'; Poli (yellow card) 77'	Stadium: Stadio San Paolo; Attendance: 41,034; Referee: Mauro Bergonzi

4 March 2012 26	Internazionale	2–2	Catania	Milan
20:45 CET	Forlán 71'; Sneijder (yellow card) 75'; Milito 80'	Report	Gómez 20'; Izco (yellow card) 35', (goal) 38'	Stadium: San Siro; Attendance: 28,970; Referee: Domenico Celi

9 March 2012 27	Chievo	0–2	Internazionale	Verona
20:45 CET		Report	Milito (penalty missed) 14' 90'; Samuel 87'	Stadium: Stadio Marc'Antonio Bentegodi; Attendance: 19,000; Referee: Paolo Silvio Mazzoleni

18 March 2012 28	Internazionale	0–0	Atalanta	Milan
15:00 CET	Milito (penalty missed) 23'; Lúcio (yellow card) 60'; Samuel (yellow card) 85'	Report	Bellini (yellow card) 22'; Cigarini (yellow card) 32'; Moralez (yellow card) 75'; Carmona (yellow card) 86'	Stadium: San Siro; Referee: Gabriele Gava

25 March 2012 29	Juventus	2–0	Internazionale	Turin
20:45 CET	Cáceres 57'; Del Piero 71'; De Ceglie (yellow card) 75'	Report	Nagatomo (yellow card) 34'; Poli (yellow card) 45'	Stadium: Juventus Stadium; Attendance: 34,000; Referee: Andrea De Marco

1 April 2012 30	Internazionale	5–4	Genoa	Milan
14:00 CET	Milito 13', 27', 85' (pen.); Samuel 38'; Poli (yellow card) 62'; Zárate 74'; Júlio César (red card) 79'; Lúcio (yellow card) 89'	Report	Moretti (yellow card) 41', (goal) 45+2'; Palacio 59' (pen.), (yellow card) 78'; Janković (yellow card) 62'; Gilardino 80' (pen.), 90' (pen.); Belluschi (red card) 84'; Mesto (yellow card) 88'	Stadium: San Siro; Attendance: 42,322; Referee: Paolo Valeri

7 April 2012 31	Cagliari	2–2	Internazionale	Trieste
15:00 CET	Astori 5'; Pinilla (yellow card) 18' (yellow-red card) 62', (goal) 61'; Conti (yellow card) 43'; Cossu (yellow card) 62'	Report	Milito 6'; Stanković (yellow card) 26'; Zárate (yellow card) 38'; Cambiasso 64'; Forlán (yellow card) 71'	Stadium: Stadio Nereo Rocco; Attendance: 9,000; Referee: Marco Guida

11 April 2012 32	Internazionale	2–1	Siena	Milan
20:45 CET	Samuel (yellow card) 20'; Milito 42', 81' (pen.)	Report	D'Agostino 6'; Pesoli (yellow card) 44'; Vitiello (yellow card) 60'; Mannini (yellow card) 84'; Contini (yellow card) 84'	Stadium: San Siro; Attendance: 46,327; Referee: Andrea Romeo

22 April 2012 34	Fiorentina	0–0	Internazionale	Florence
12:30 CET	Nastasić (yellow card) 45'; Acosty (yellow card) 73'; Pasqual (yellow card) 77'; Cerci (yellow card) 84'	Report	Chivu (yellow card) 16'; Milito (yellow card) 45'; Júlio César (yellow card) 68'; Lúcio (yellow card) 80'; Zárate (yellow card) 89'	Stadium: Stadio Artemio Franchi; Attendance: 22,000; Referee: Paolo Valeri

25 April 2012 33	Udinese	1–3	Internazionale	Udine
15:00 CET	Danilo 6', (yellow card) 45+1'; Floro Flores (yellow card) 57'	Report	Sneijder 10', 28'; Stanković (yellow card) 35'; Álvarez 37'	Stadium: Stadio Friuli; Attendance: 18,000; Referee: Luca Banti

29 April 2012 35	Internazionale	2–1	Cesena	Milan
15:00 CET	Von Bergen 59' (o.g.); Zárate 72'	Report	Benalouane (yellow card) 42'; Ceccarelli 57'; Santana (yellow card) 62'	Stadium: San Siro; Attendance: 45,802; Referee: Andrea Romeo

2 May 2012 36	Parma	3–1	Internazionale	Parma
20:45 CET	Marqués (yellow card) 33' (goal) 53'; Giovinco 55'; Valdés (yellow card) 66'; Biabiany 82'; Galloppa (yellow card) 88'	Report	Sneijder 13'; Obi (yellow card) 20'; Maicon (yellow card) 45+1'	Stadium: Stadio Ennio Tardini; Attendance: 14,817; Referee: Daniele Orsato

6 May 2012 37	Internazionale	4–2	Milan	Milan
20:45 CET	Milito 14', 52' (pen.), 79' (pen.); Maicon 87'	Report	Ibrahimović 44' (pen.), 46'; Nocerino (yellow card) 45+3'; Abate (yellow card) 53' van Bommel (yellow card) 76'	Stadium: San Siro; Attendance: 78,222; Referee: Nicola Rizzoli

13 May 2012 38	Lazio	3–1	Internazionale	Rome
20:45 CET	Lulić (yellow card) 16'; Diakité (yellow card) 52'; Kozák 58'; Candreva 63'; Konko (yellow card) 79'; Mauri 90+1'	Report	Milito 45' (pen.)	Stadium: Stadio Olimpico; Attendance: 45,051; Referee: Antonio Damato

=== Coppa Italia ===
==== Round of 16 ====
19 January 2012 Round of 16	Internazionale	2–1	Genoa	Milan
21:00 CET	Maicon 9'; Poli 49'	Report	Birsa 90+2'	Stadium: San Siro; Attendance: 12,823; Referee: Carmine Russo

==== Quarter-finals ====
25 January 2012 Quarter-finals	Napoli	2–0	Internazionale	Naples
21:00 CET	Cavani 50', 90+3' (pen.); Maggio (yellow card) 60'; Gargano (yellow card) 86'	Report	Chivu (yellow card) 24'; Sneijder (yellow card) 39'; Milito (yellow card) 67'	Stadium: San Paolo; Attendance: 27,265; Referee: Domenico Celi

=== Supercoppa Italiana ===
6 August 2011	Milan	2–1	Internazionale	Beijing, China
20:00 CST (UTC+08:00)	Gattuso (yellow card) 20'; Ibrahimović 60'; Zambrotta (yellow card) 64'; Boateng 69' (yellow card) 78'; Ambrosini (yellow card) 86'	Report	Sneijder 22' (yellow card) 61'	Stadium: Beijing National Stadium; Attendance: 70,000; Referee: Nicola Rizzoli

=== UEFA Champions League ===
==== Group stage ====
Pos	Team	Pld	W	D	L	GF	GA	GD	Pts	Qualification
1	(Italy) Internazionale	6	3	1	2	8	7	+1	10	Advance to knockout phase
2	(Russia) CSKA Moscow	6	2	2	2	9	8	+1	8	Advance to knockout phase
3	(Turkey) Trabzonspor	6	1	4	1	3	5	−2	7	Transfer to Europa League
4	(France) Lille	6	1	3	2	6	6	0	6	

Source: Soccerway

14 September 2011 1	Internazionale (Italy)	0–1	(Turkey) Trabzonspor	Milan, Italy
20:45 CET	Nagatomo (yellow card) 21'; Zárate (yellow card) 41'	Report	Kaçar (yellow card) 29'; Alanzinho (yellow card) 54'; Čech (yellow card) 66'; Altıntop (yellow card) 66'; Čelůstka 76'	Stadium: San Siro; Attendance: 24,444; Referee: Stefan Johannesson (Sweden)

27 September 2011 2	CSKA Moscow (Russia)	2–3	(Italy) Internazionale	Moscow, Russia
18:00 CET	Dzagoev 45+3'; Vágner Love 77'	Report	Lúcio 6'; Pazzini 23'; Obi (yellow card) 69'; Zárate 79'; Cambiasso (yellow card) 90+1'	Stadium: Luzhniki Stadium; Attendance: 35,000; Referee: Craig Thomson (Scotland)

18 October 2011 3	Lille (France)	0–1	(Italy) Internazionale	Villeneuve-d'Ascq, France
20:45 CET	Chedjou (yellow card) 43'; Pedretti (yellow card) 55'	Report	Pazzini 21'; Chivu (yellow card) 41'; Motta (yellow card) 51'	Stadium: Stade Lille-Metropole; Attendance: 16,996; Referee: Howard Webb (England)

2 November 2011 4	Internazionale (Italy)	2–1	(France) Lille	Milan, Italy
20:45 CET	Samuel 18' (yellow card) 89'; Milito 65'	Report	Melo 83'; Béria (yellow card) 86'; Rozehnal (yellow card) 90+1'	Stadium: San Siro; Attendance: 24,299; Referee: Wolfgang Stark (Germany)

22 November 2011 5	Trabzonspor (Turkey)	1–1	(Italy) Internazionale	Trabzon, Turkey
20:45 CET	Altıntop 23'; Głowacki (yellow card) 42'; Balcı (yellow card) 57'	Report	Chivu (yellow card) 11'; Álvarez 18' (yellow card) 85'	Stadium: Hüseyin Avni Aker Stadium; Attendance: 21,611; Referee: Martin Atkinson (England)

7 December 2011 6	Internazionale (Italy)	1–2	(Russia) CSKA Moscow	Milan, Italy
20:45 CET	Cambiasso 51'; Caldirola (yellow card) 64'	Report	Šemberas (yellow card) 22'; Doumbia 50'; Mamayev (yellow card) 63'; Nababkin (yellow card) 69'; V. Berezutski 86'	Stadium: San Siro; Attendance: 23,295; Referee: David Fernández Borbalán (Spain)

==== Knockout phase ====
===== Round of 16 =====
22 February 2012 First leg	Marseille (France)	1–0	(Italy) Internazionale	Marseille, France
20:45	Ayew 90+3'; Diawara (yellow card) 74'	Report	Stanković (yellow card) 58'; Zárate (yellow card) 60'; Chivu (yellow card) 67'	Stadium: Stade Vélodrome; Attendance: 37,346; Referee: Cüneyt Çakır (Turkey)

13 March 2012 Second leg	Internazionale (Italy)	2–1 (2–2 (a) agg.)	(France) Marseille	Milan, Italy
20:45	Zanetti (yellow card) 24'; Samuel (yellow card) 53'; Milito 75'; Stanković (yellow card) 90'; Pazzini 90+6' (pen.)	Report	Diawara (yellow card) 67'; Mandanda (yellow card) 68' (yellow-red card) 90+5'; Brandão 90+2'	Stadium: San Siro; Attendance: 62,632; Referee: Pedro Proença (Portugal)

== Statistics ==
=== Appearances and goals ===
As of 13 May 2012

No.	Pos	Nat	Player	Total		Serie A		Coppa Italia		Supercoppa Italiana		Champions League	
No.	Pos	Nat	Player	Apps	Goals	Apps	Goals	Apps	Goals	Apps	Goals	Apps	Goals
Goalkeepers
1	GK	(Brazil) BRA	Júlio César	40	0	33	0	0	0	1	0	6	0
12	GK	(Italy) ITA	Luca Castellazzi	10	0	5+2	0	1	0	0	0	2	0
21	GK	(Italy) ITA	Paolo Orlandoni	0	0	0	0	0	0	0	0	0	0
Defenders
2	DF	(Colombia) COL	Iván Córdoba	5	0	1+4	0	0	0	0	0	0	0
4	DF	(Argentina) ARG	Javier Zanetti	45	1	34	1	2	0	1	0	8	0
6	DF	(Brazil) BRA	Lúcio	41	2	34	1	0	0	0	0	7	1
13	DF	(Brazil) BRA	Maicon	29	3	24	2	2	1	0	0	3	0
23	DF	(Italy) ITA	Andrea Ranocchia	17	1	11+1	1	2	0	1	0	2	0
25	DF	(Argentina) ARG	Walter Samuel	35	3	27	2	1	0	1	0	6	1
26	DF	(Romania) ROU	Cristian Chivu	22	0	13+1	0	1	0	1	0	6	0
37	DF	(Italy) ITA	Marco Faraoni	18	1	7+7	1	1	0	0+1	0	1+1	0
40	DF	(Brazil) BRA	Juan Jesus	1	0	0+1	0	0	0	0	0	0	0
55	DF	(Japan) JPN	Yuto Nagatomo	43	2	30+5	2	0+1	0	0	0	6+1	0
Midfielders
5	MF	(Serbia) SRB	Dejan Stanković	25	0	14+5	0	0	0	1	0	4+1	0
10	MF	(Netherlands) NED	Wesley Sneijder	28	5	15+5	4	2	0	1	1	5	0
11	MF	(Argentina) ARG	Ricky Álvarez	29	3	15+6	2	0+2	0	1	0	3+2	1
14	MF	(Colombia) COL	Fredy Guarín	6	0	5+1	0	0	0	0	0	0	0
17	MF	(Italy) ITA	Angelo Palombo	3	0	2+1	0	0	0	0	0	0	0
18	MF	(Italy) ITA	Andrea Poli	20	1	9+9	0	1	1	0	0	1	0
19	MF	(Argentina) ARG	Esteban Cambiasso	46	5	35+2	4	1	0	0	0	7+1	1
20	MF	(Nigeria) NGR	Joel Obi	37	0	11+16	0	2	0	1	0	3+4	0
48	MF	(Italy) ITA	Lorenzo Crisetig	1	0	0	0	0	0	0	0	0+1	0
Forwards
7	FW	(Italy) ITA	Giampaolo Pazzini	40	8	22+11	5	0	0	4+2	3	0+1	0
9	FW	(Uruguay) URU	Diego Forlán	20	2	14+4	2	0	0	0	0	2	0
22	FW	(Argentina) ARG	Diego Milito	41	26	29+4	24	1	0	0	0	5+2	2
30	FW	(Netherlands) NED	Luc Castaignos	8	1	1+5	1	1	0	0+1	0	0	0
32	FW	(Argentina) ARG	Mauro Zárate	31	3	10+12	2	0+2	0	0	0	5+2	1
Players transferred out during the season
8	MF	(Italy) ITA	Thiago Motta	14	3	10	3	1	0	1	0	2	0
9	FW	(Cameroon) CMR	Samuel Eto'o	1	0	0	0	0	0	1	0	0	0
16	DF	(Italy) ITA	Luca Caldirola	1	0	0	0	0	0	0	0	1	0
29	MF	(Brazil) BRA	Philippe Coutinho	8	1	4+1	1	0	0	0	0	1+2	0
42	DF	(Brazil) BRA	Jonathan	8	1	1+5	1	1	0	0+1	0	0	0
77	MF	(Ghana) GHA	Sulley Muntari	4	0	1+3	0	0	0	0	0	0	0

=== Goalscorers ===
No.	Pos.	Nation	Name	Serie A	Coppa Italia	Supercoppa Italiana	Champions League	Total
22	FW	(Argentina)	Diego Milito	24	0	0	2	26
7	FW	(Italy)	Giampaolo Pazzini	5	0	0	3	8
10	MF	(Netherlands)	Wesley Sneijder	4	0	1	0	5
19	MF	(Argentina)	Esteban Cambiasso	4	0	0	1	5
8	MF	(Italy)	Thiago Motta	3	0	0	0	3
11	MF	(Argentina)	Ricky Álvarez	2	0	0	1	3
13	DF	(Brazil)	Maicon	2	1	0	0	3
25	DF	(Argentina)	Walter Samuel	2	0	0	1	3
28	FW	(Argentina)	Mauro Zárate	2	0	0	1	3
6	DF	(Brazil)	Lúcio	1	0	0	1	2
9	FW	(Uruguay)	Diego Forlán	2	0	0	0	2
55	DF	(Japan)	Yuto Nagatomo	2	0	0	0	2
18	MF	(Italy)	Andrea Poli	0	1	0	0	1
23	DF	(Italy)	Andrea Ranocchia	1	0	0	0	1
29	MF	(Brazil)	Philippe Coutinho	1	0	0	0	1
30	FW	(Netherlands)	Luc Castaignos	1	0	0	0	1
37	DF	(Italy)	Davide Faraoni	1	0	0	0	1
#	Own goals			1	0	0	0	1
TOTAL				58	2	1	10	71

Last updated: 13 May 2012

=== Injuries during the season ===
Date	Player	Injury	Estimated Return Date	Source
23 July 2011	(Italy) Emiliano Viviano	Complete lesion of anterior cruciate ligament in left knee.	January 2012	inter.it
24 July 2011	(Italy) Luca Castellazzi	Blunt force trauma.	August 2011	inter.it
7 September 2011	(Italy) Thiago Motta	Pulled hamstring (the biceps femoris muscle) in left thigh.	September 2011	inter.it

Last updated: July 30, 2011

== Awards ==
Individual

Player	Nat.	Award	Source
Samuel Eto'o	(Cameroon)	Golden Foot	inter.it
Javier Zanetti	(Argentina)	Golden Foot	inter.it

italic: nominated
