= Teodorani =

Teodorani is an Italian surname. Notable people with the surname include:

- Alex Teodorani (born 1991), Italian footballer
- Carlo Teodorani (born 1977), Italian footballer
