= Luca Ricci =

Luca Ricci may refer to:

- Luca Ricci (Canadian soccer) (born 1998)
- Luca Ricci (Italian footballer) (born 1989)
