= Igor Campedelli =

Igor Campedelli (born 13 March 1974 in Cesena, Italy) is an Italian businessman and former football administrator, best known for his connections to Cesena Football Club and SC Olhanense.

== Career ==
In late 2007, Campedelli entered the ownership structure of Cesena Football Club and became president of the club. During his tenure, Cesena returned to Serie B and later to Serie A, achieving two consecutive promotions and returning to the top tier of Italian football after around two decades.

In April 2013, Campedelli resigned as president of Cesena.

In 2013, Campedelli became involved with SC Olhanense in Portugal. During that period, he was identified as an Italian administrator and the main representative of the group that held the majority of the club's SAD.

In 2015, he was described as an administrator and representative of the main investment group controlling Olhanense.

== Post-administrative career ==
In 2018, Campedelli founded SFERICO Sports Management, a company based in Leça da Palmeira, Matosinhos, Portugal, where he holds the roles of CEO and senior agent. The agency operates in player representation, scouting, career management and football consultancy.
