= Roberto Guana =

Italian footballer (born 1981)

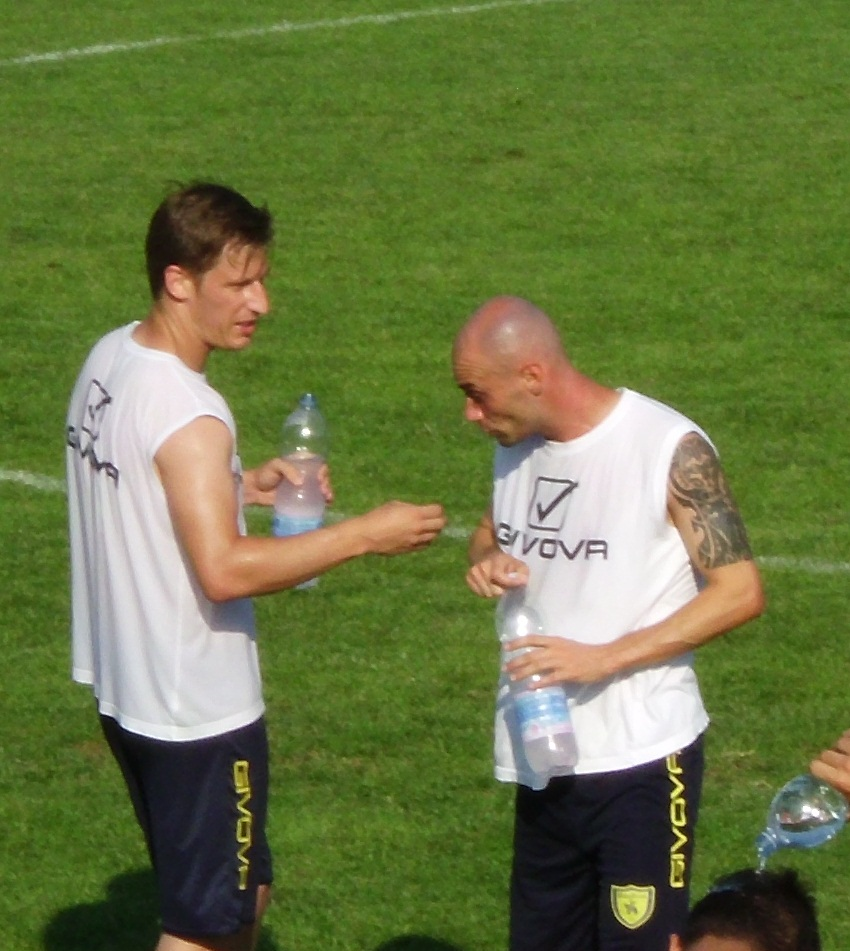
- Guana talks to Birsa during a training session with Chievo in 2014

Personal information
- Full name: Roberto Guana
- Date of birth: 21 January 1981 (age 45)
- Place of birth: Brescia, Italy
- Height: 1.78 m (5 ft 10 in)
- Position: Defensive midfielder

Youth career
- Brescia

Senior career*
Years	Team	Apps	(Gls)
1999–2005	Brescia	56	(0)
2003	→ Cagliari (loan)	6	(0)
2005–2006	Ascoli	33	(1)
2006–2011	Palermo	83	(0)
2009–2010	→ Bologna (loan)	34	(1)
2010–2011	→ Chievo (loan)	19	(0)
2011–2012	Cesena	31	(1)
2012–2014	Chievo	31	(0)
2014	Pescara	8	(0)
Total		301	(3)

International career
2002	Italy U21	1	(0)
- * Club domestic league appearances and goals

Roberto Guana (born 21 January 1981) is an Italian former professional footballer who played as a midfielder.

== Club career ==
Roberto started his career at Brescia Calcio. He played his first Serie A match on 4 February 2001 against A.S. Bari. In March 2005 Guana and Daniele Adani announced they would leave the club after receiving threats by Brescia fans. Both players successively joined newly promoted Serie A side Ascoli, with whom Guana appeared in a total 30 games.

His good appearances with Ascoli led Palermo to acquire the player in May 2006, for €3.5 million, as one of the first signings of the new season for the Sicilians, along with Francesco Parravicini and Alberto Fontana. He regularly featured in the starting lineup in his first two seasons, then being featured much less regularly under new head coach Davide Ballardini.

In July 2009, he was loaned to Bologna. along with teammate Andrea Raggi. He returned to Palermo at the end of the season, only to leave the Sicilians on August in order to join Chievo on another loan deal. In July 2011 he agreed a permanent move to fellow Serie A club Cesena. After Cesena's relegation, Guana was transferred to Chievo in exchange for Manuel Iori.

== International career ==
Guana played his only game for Italy U21 on 20 August 2002. He was also called up as part of the provisional squad of 2002 UEFA European Under-21 Football Championship.

== Coaching career ==
In August 2019 Guana joined his former Ascoli teammate Massimo Paci's coaching staff at Serie D club Forlì.

In August 2020 Guana followed Paci at Serie C club Teramo. He successively followed Paci also at Serie B club Pordenone from July to August 2021, Pro Vercelli from 1 July 2022 to 20 February 2023 and Pro Sesto from 23 January to 25 February 2024.
