= SC Olhanense 1912 =

Portuguese football club

Olhanense 1912
- Full name: Sporting Clube Olhanense 1912
- Founded: 2017
- Dissolved: 2025
- Ground: José Arcanjo, Olhão, Portugal
- Capacity: 5.661
- Chairman: Manuel Cajuda
- Head Coach: Miguel Serôdio
- League: A.F. Algarve – 1st Division
- 2024–25: 8th (A.F. Algarve 1st Division)
- Website: scolhanense1912.pt
Home colours	Away colours

Sporting Clube Olhanense 1912, commonly known as Olhanense 1912 or simply Olhanense, was a Portuguese football club based in Olhão, Faro district. It was founded in 2017, in response to the serious financial and management difficulties of the Sporting Clube Olhanense and its SAD. In May 2025, after the Olhanense SAD declared insolvency, the Olhanense club was able to recover its original name, thus ending Olhanense 1912.

== History ==
The difficulties of S.C. Olhanense began to be visible after their most recent stint in the Primeira Liga, reaching a breaking point between the SAD and the club. The risk of extinction was real, as when the SAD was founded, a protocol was signed stipulating that the club could not engage in senior football unless under the authority of the SAD.

However, it was only in the 2023–24 season that Olhanense 1912 played its first season in senior football, after the SAD of S.C. Olhanense decided to forgo participation in the 1st Division of the A.F. Algarve that season. Olhanense would remain without senior football until the dismantling of the SAD.

However, thanks to the signing of a contract, Olhanense 1912 was able to register a senior team and share facilities with S.C. Olhanense. Their debut was in the 2nd Division of the A.F.A., and Olhanense 1912 achieved promotion to the 1st Division of the district in their very first season, as the champions.

In the board of Olhanense 1912 is Manuel Cajuda, a renowned former player and football coach from Olhão.

== Seasons ==
Season	Level	Division	Section	Place	Movements
2023–24	Tier 6	A.F. Algarve 2ª Divisão	Série Sotavento	1st	
2023–24	Tier 6	A.F. Algarve 2ª Divisão	Champion phase	1st	Promoted
2024–25	Tier 5	A.F. Algarve 1ª Divisão	1st phase	8th	
2024–25	Tier 5	A.F. Algarve 1ª Divisão	Relegation phase	4th	
