= Luca Ceccarelli (footballer, born 24 March 1983) =

Italian footballer

Personal information
- Date of birth: 24 March 1983 (age 43)
- Place of birth: Gambettola, Italy
- Height: 1.83 m (6 ft 0 in)
- Positions: Right-back; right winger

Youth career
- –1999: Massese
- 1999–2001: Cesena

Senior career*
Years	Team	Apps	(Gls)
2001–2014	Cesena	159	(5)
2003	→ Sangiovannese (loan)	5	(0)
2004	→ Pro Patria (loan)	2	(0)
2004–2005	→ Pavia (loan)	30	(2)
2006	→ Pavia (loan)	13	(1)
2006–2007	→ San Marino (loan)	10	(1)
2007–2008	→ Legnano (loan)	24	(6)
2013–2014	→ Padova (loan)	19	(0)
2014–2016	Bologna	29	(1)
2016	→ Salernitana (loan)	14	(0)
2016–2017	Dinamo București	7	(0)
2017–2018	San Marino	25	(3)
2018–2022	Cervia	30	(0)
Total		367	(19)

Managerial career
- 2022–2023: Cervia
- * Club domestic league appearances and goals

Luca Ceccarelli (born 24 March 1983) is an Italian former professional footballer who played as a right back.

== Career ==
=== Cesena ===
Born in Florence, Tuscany, Ceccarelli started his career at Cesena. He won Serie C1 promotion playoffs in 2004. He then loaned back to Serie C1 clubs Pavia and San Marino Calcio. After Cesena was relegated in June 2008, Ceccarelli returned to the team for their Lega Pro Prima Divisione (ex-Serie C1) campaign, which Romagna side won the Group A champion.

==== 2009–10 season ====
In the 2009–10 season, he played as an emergency central back (against Frosinone in May 2010) and other positions, including right back ahead of Martin Petráš in the last ten matches of the season. That season, Cesena won promotion to Serie A.

==== 2010–11 season ====
Ceccarelli made his debut on the first round of 2010–11 Serie A, a 0–0 draw with previous season runner-up Roma. He lost his starting place in November, after the match slipped from the top to the bottom and failed to win for over five matches. Yuto Nagatomo was moved from left back to right back and Maurizio Lauro took back the starting place. On 28 November, he re-took the starting place but rested against Cagliari on 18 December, the match before the winter break.

After Nagatomo left the club in January for international duty, his starting place became solid again, and he only missed the match against Roma. In late January, Nagatomo left for Internazionale, in exchange with Davide Santon, made Ceccarelli played more regularly, only missed the match against the strong team for team tactic, as the coach demanded a more defensive right-back instead of a wing-back: Napoli (replaced by Dellafiore), Juventus, Lazio and Palermo (replaced by Santon) and a relegation decider (against bottom team Bari)

Overall, he started 25 times, made the most assists among the teammate (5), cautioned six times and suspended once (in round 28).

==== 2011–12 season ====
At the start of the season, Cesena signed experienced right-back Gianluca Comotto, made Ceccarelli became his understudy.

==== Padova (loan) ====
In summer 2013, he was signed by Padova, with Niccolò Galli moving in the opposite direction.

=== Bologna ===
In June 2014, Bologna signed Ceccarelli (in a cashless swap with Federico Agliardi), on a three-year contract. He played 29 games out of possible 42 games of 2014–15 Serie B season for the promotion playoff winner.

He failed to play any game for Bologna in 2015–16 Serie A. On 13 January 2016, Ceccarelli returned to Serie B for Salernitana in a temporary deal.

On 31 August 2016, Ceccarelli was released by Bologna.

=== Dinamo București ===
In October 2016, Ceccarelli signed a deal with Romanian side Dinamo București.

== Honours ==
Cesena

- Lega Pro Prima Divisione: 2008–09
- Coppa Italia Serie C : 2003–04
