= 2011–12 in Italian football =

The 2011–12 season was the 110th season of competitive football in Italy.

== Promotions and relegations (pre-season) ==
Teams promoted to Serie A

- Siena
- Atalanta
- Novara

Teams relegated from Serie A

- Sampdoria
- Brescia
- Bari

Teams promoted to Serie B

- Gubbio
- Nocerina
- Hellas Verona
- Juve Stabia

Teams relegated from Serie B

- Piacenza
- Triestina
- Portogruaro
- Frosinone

== Honours ==
=== Trophy and league Champions ===
Competition	Winner	Details	Stadium Location	Date	Match Report
Supercoppa Italiana	Milan	2011 Supercoppa Italiana beat Internazionale 2 – 1	Beijing National Stadium; Beijing	6 August 2011	Report
Serie A	Juventus	2011–12 Serie A beat Cagliari 2 – 0	Stadio Nereo Rocco; Trieste	6 May 2012	Report
Coppa Italia	Napoli	2011–12 Coppa Italia beat Juventus 2 – 0	Stadio Olimpico; Rome	20 May 2012	Report
Serie B	Pescara	2011–12 Serie B beat Nocerina 1 – 0	Stadio Adriatico; Pescara	26 May 2012	
Supercoppa di Lega di Prima Divisione	Spezia	2012 Supercoppa di Lega di Prima Divisione beat Ternana 2 – 1 (agg.)	Stadio Alberto Picco; La Spezia	17 May 2012	
Supercoppa di Lega di Seconda Divisione	Perugia	2012 Supercoppa di Lega di Seconda Divisione beat Treviso 2a – 2 (agg.)	Stadio Renato Curi; Perugia	20 May 2012	
Coppa Italia Lega Pro	Spezia	2011–12 Coppa Italia Lega Pro beat Pisa 2a – 2 (agg.)	Arena Garibaldi; Pisa	2 May 2012	

=== Promotion winners ===
Competition	Winner	Details
Serie B	Torino	2nd
Lega Pro Prima Divisione	Ternana	Winner Girone A
Lega Pro Seconda Divisione	Treviso	Winner Girone A
Lega Pro Seconda Divisione	San Marino	2nd in Girone A
Lega Pro Seconda Divisione	Catanzaro	2nd in Girone B

=== Playoff winners ===
Competition	Winner	Details
Serie B	Sampdoria	2011–12 Serie B beat Varese 4 – 2 (agg.)
Lega Pro Prima Divisione	Pro Vercelli	Girone A beat Carpi 3 – 1 (agg.)
Lega Pro Prima Divisione	Virtus Lanciano	Girone B beat Trapani 4 – 2 (agg.)
Lega Pro Seconda Divisione	Cuneo	Girone A beat Virtus Entella 6 – 3 (agg.)
Lega Pro Seconda Divisione	Paganese	Girone B beat Chieti 2 – 0 (agg.)

== Italy national football team ==
=== Euro 2012 qualification ===
Pos	Team	Pld	W	D	L	GF	GA	GD	Pts	Qualification
1	Italy	10	8	2	0	20	2	+18	26	Qualify for final tournament
2	Estonia	10	5	1	4	15	14	+1	16	Advance to play-offs
3	Serbia	10	4	3	3	13	12	+1	15	
4	Slovenia	10	4	2	4	11	7	+4	14	
5	Northern Ireland	10	2	3	5	9	13	−4	9	
6	Faroe Islands	10	1	1	8	6	26	−20	4	

Source: UEFA
Rules for classification: Qualification tiebreakers

2 September 2011	Faroe Islands	0 – 1	Italy	Tórsvøllur, Tórshavn
20:45 CEST	Olsen (yellow card) 56'	Report	Cassano 11'	Referee: Tamás Bognár (Hungary)

6 September 2011	Italy	1 – 0	Slovenia	Stadio Artemio Franchi, Florence
20:45 CEST	Balzaretti (yellow card) 64'; Pazzini 85'	Report	Koren (yellow card) 24'; Brečko (yellow card) 64'; Cesar (yellow card) 85'; Iličić (yellow card) 90+2'	Referee: Svein Oddvar Moen (Norway)

7 October 2011	Serbia	1 – 1	Italy	Stadion Crvena Zvezda, Belgrade
20:45 CEST	Ivanović 26', (yellow card) 55'; Stanković (yellow card) 80'; Tošić (yellow card) 88'; Žigić (yellow card) 90'	Report	Marchisio 2'; Maggio (yellow card) 28'	Referee: Pedro Proença (Portugal)

11 October 2011	Italy	3 – 0	Northern Ireland	Stadio Adriatico, Pescara
20:45 CEST	Cassano 21', 53'; McAuley 74' (o.g.)	Report		Referee: Antonio Mateu Lahoz (Spain)

=== Friendlies ===
10 August 2011	Italy	2 – 1	Spain	Stadio San Nicola, Bari
20:45 CEST	Montolivo 11'; Chiellini (yellow card) 67'; Aquilani 84'; Balotelli (yellow card) 90'	Report	Alonso 37' (pen.); Arbeloa (yellow card) 56'	Referee: Felix Brych (Germany)

11 November 2011	Poland	0 – 2	Italy	Stadion Miejski, Wrocław
20:45 CET	Polanski (yellow card) 55'	Report	Balotelli 30'; Pazzini 60'; Ogbonna (yellow card) 90+3'	Referee: Laurent Duhamel (France)

15 November 2011	Italy	0 – 1	Uruguay	Stadio Olimpico, Rome
20:45 CET	Balotelli (yellow card) 50'; Chiellini (yellow card) 90+5'	Report	Fernández 3'; Cáceres (yellow card) 23'; Lugano (yellow card) 34'; Cavani (yellow card) 40'; Á. Pereira (yellow card) 26' (yellow-red card) 81'; Muslera (yellow card) 86'	Referee: Duarte Gomes (Portugal)

29 February 2012	Italy	0 – 1	United States	Stadio Luigi Ferraris, Genoa
20:45 CET	Chiellini (yellow card) 66'	Report	Dempsey 55'; Bocanegra (yellow card) 68'	Referee: Fırat Aydınus (Turkey)

1 June 2012	Italy	0 – 3	Russia	Letzigrund Stadion, Zürich
20:45 CEST	Balotelli (yellow card)	Report	Kerzhakov 60'; Shirokov 75', 89'; Arshavin (yellow card); Pavlyuchenko (yellow card)	Attendance: 18,000; Referee: Nikolaj Haenni (Russia)

== League tables ==
=== Serie A ===
Pos	Team	Pld	W	D	L	GF	GA	GD	Pts	Qualification or relegation
1	Juventus (C)	38	23	15	0	68	20	+48	84	Qualification to Champions League group stage
2	Milan	38	24	8	6	74	33	+41	80	Qualification to Champions League group stage
3	Udinese	38	18	10	10	52	35	+17	64	Qualification to Champions League play-off round
4	Lazio	38	18	8	12	56	47	+9	62	Qualification to Europa League play-off round
5	Napoli	38	16	13	9	66	46	+20	61	Qualification to Europa League group stage (Note: Napoli qualified to the group stage of the Europa League as winner of the 2011–12 Coppa Italia. As they finished fifth, the sixth-placed team of the league also qualified for the Europa League.)
6	Internazionale	38	17	7	14	58	55	+3	58	Qualification to Europa League third qualifying round
7	Roma	38	16	8	14	60	54	+6	56 (Note: Roma finished ahead of Parma on head–to–head away goals scored: Parma 0–1 Roma, Roma 1–0 Parma.)	
8	Parma	38	15	11	12	54	53	+1	56	
9	Bologna	38	13	12	13	41	43	−2	51	
10	Chievo	38	12	13	13	35	45	−10	49	
11	Catania	38	11	15	12	47	52	−5	48	
12	Atalanta (Note: Atalanta were deducted 6 points due to involvement in the 2011–12 Italian football scandal.)	38	13	13	12	41	43	−2	46 (Note: Atalanta finished ahead of Fiorentina on head–to–head away goals scored: Atalanta 2–0 Fiorentina, Fiorentina 2–2 Atalanta.)	
13	Fiorentina	38	11	13	14	37	43	−6	46	
14	Siena	38	11	11	16	45	45	0	44	
15	Cagliari	38	10	13	15	37	46	−9	43 (Note: Cagliari finished ahead of Palermo on goal difference : Cagliari 2–1 Palermo, Palermo 3–2 Cagliari; Cagliari = –9, Palermo = –10.)	
16	Palermo	38	11	10	17	52	62	−10	43	
17	Genoa	38	11	9	18	50	69	−19	42	
18	Lecce (R, D, R)	38	8	12	18	40	56	−16	36	Relegation to Serie C1 (Note: Lecce were originally relegated to Serie B, but further relegated to Lega Pro Prima Divisione due to involvement in the 2011–12 Italian football scandal.)
19	Novara (R)	38	7	11	20	35	65	−30	32	Relegation to Serie B
20	Cesena (R)	38	4	10	24	24	60	−36	22	Relegation to Serie B

Source: Lega Serie A
Rules for classification: 1) points; 2) head-to-head points; 3) head-to-head goal difference; 4) head-to-head goals scored; 5) goal difference; 6) number of goals scored
(C) Champions; (D) Disqualified; (R) Relegated

=== Serie B ===
Pos	Team	Pld	W	D	L	GF	GA	GD	Pts	Promotion or relegation
1	Pescara (C, P)	42	26	5	11	90	55	+35	83 (Note: PES 2–0 TOR; TOR 4–2 PES)	Promotion to Serie A
2	Torino (P)	42	24	11	7	57	28	+29	83	Promotion to Serie A
3	Sassuolo	42	22	14	6	57	33	+24	80	Qualification to promotion play-off
4	Hellas Verona	42	23	9	10	60	41	+19	78	Qualification to promotion play-off
5	Varese	42	20	11	11	57	41	+16	71	Qualification to promotion play-off
6	Sampdoria (O, P)	42	17	16	9	53	34	+19	67	Qualification to promotion play-off
7	Padova	42	18	9	15	56	58	−2	63	
8	Brescia	42	15	12	15	48	50	−2	57 (Note: BRE 0–0 JST; JST 0–1 BRE)	
9	Juve Stabia (Note: Juve Stabia was docked 4 points: 1 point due to financial irregularities and 3 points (originally 5 points, reduced to 3 in appeal) for match fixing with Sorrento.)	42	16	13	13	53	49	+4	57	
10	Reggina	42	14	13	15	63	59	+4	55	
11	Crotone (Note: Crotone was docked 2 points due to financial irregularities.)	42	13	15	14	60	58	+2	52 (Note: CRO 2–2 MOD; MOD 1–1 CRO)	
12	Modena	42	12	16	14	50	58	−8	52	
13	Bari (Note: Bari was docked 6 points due to financial irregularities.)	42	14	14	14	47	48	−1	50	
14	Grosseto	42	11	16	15	47	60	−13	49 (Note: GRO 3–3 ASC; ASC 0–2 GRO)	
15	Ascoli (Note: Ascoli was docked 7 points: 4 points due to financial irregularities and 3 points (originally 6 points, reduced to 3 in appeal) due to the 2011 Italian football scandal.)	42	15	11	16	47	50	−3	49	
16	Cittadella	42	13	9	20	51	64	−13	48 (Note: CIT 2–2 LIV; LIV 1–2 CIT)	
17	Livorno	42	12	12	18	49	49	0	48	
18	Empoli	42	12	11	19	48	59	−11	47	Qualification to relegation play-off
19	Vicenza (Note: Vicenza remained in the league for the relegation of Lecce due to a 2011–12 Italian football scandal.) (T)	42	10	14	18	43	61	−18	44	Qualification to relegation play-off
20	Nocerina (R)	42	10	10	22	52	71	−19	40	Relegation to Lega Pro Prima Divisione
21	Gubbio (R)	42	7	11	24	37	69	−32	32	Relegation to Lega Pro Prima Divisione
22	AlbinoLeffe (R)	42	6	12	24	39	69	−30	30	Relegation to Lega Pro Prima Divisione

Source: https://int.soccerway.com/national/italy/serie-b/2011-2012/regular-season/
Rules for classification: 1) points; 2) head-to-head points; 3) head-to-head goal difference; 4) head-to-head goals scored; 5) goal difference; 6) number of goals scored.
(C) Champions; (O) Play-off winners; (P) Promoted; (R) Relegated; (T) Qualified, but not yet for the particular phase indicated

== Clubs in international competitions ==
=== Milan ===
==== UEFA Champions League ====
===== Group stage =====
13 September 2011 Round 1	Barcelona (Spain)	2 – 2	(Italy) Milan	Camp Nou, Barcelona
20:45 CEST	Pedro 36'; Villa 50'	Report	Pato 1'; Silva 90+2'	Attendance: 89,861; Referee: Martin Atkinson (England)

28 September 2011 Round 2	Milan (Italy)	2 – 0	(Czech Republic) Viktoria Plzeň	San Siro, Milan
20:45 CEST	Ibrahimović 53' (pen.); Cassano 66'	Report		Attendance: 66,859; Referee: Florian Meyer (Germany)

19 October 2011 Round 3	Milan (Italy)	2 – 0	(Belarus) BATE Borisov	San Siro, Milan
20:45 CEST	Ibrahimović 33'; Boateng 70'	Report		Attendance: 66,040; Referee: Tom Harald Hagen (Norway)

1 November 2011 Round 4	BATE Borisov (Belarus)	1 – 1	(Italy) Milan	Stadion Dynama, Minsk
18:00 CET	Bressan 55' (pen.)	Report	Ibrahimović 22'	Attendance: 29,100; Referee: Peter Rasmussen (Denmark)
Note: BATE Borisov played their home matches at Stadion Dynama, Minsk as their own Haradski Stadium did not meet UEFA criteria.

23 November 2011 Round 5	Milan (Italy)	2 – 3	(Spain) Barcelona	San Siro, Milan
20:45 CET	Ibrahimović 20'; Boateng 54'	Report	Van Bommel 14' (o.g.); Messi 31' (pen.); Xavi 63'	Attendance: 78,927; Referee: Wolfgang Stark (Germany)

6 December 2011 Round 6	Viktoria Plzeň (Czech Republic)	2 – 2	(Italy) Milan	Synot Tip Arena, Prague^{2}
20:45 CET	Bystroň 89'; Ďuriš 90+3'	Report	Pato 47'; Robinho 49'	Attendance: 19,854; Referee: William Collum (Scotland)
Note: Viktoria Plzeň played their home matches at Synot Tip Arena, Prague as their own Stadion města Plzně did not meet UEFA criteria.

===== Knockout phase =====
15 February 2012 Round of 16 - 1st leg	Milan (Italy)	4 – 0	(England) Arsenal	San Siro, Milan
20:45 CET	Boateng 15'; Robinho 38', 49'; Ibrahimović 79' (pen.)	Report		Attendance: 64,462; Referee: Viktor Kassai (Hungary)

6 March 2012 Round of 16 - 2nd leg	Arsenal (England)	3 – 0 (3 – 4 agg.)	(Italy) Milan	Emirates Stadium, London
20:45 CET	Koscielny 7'; Rosický 26'; Van Persie 43' (pen.)	Report		Attendance: 59,973; Referee: Damir Skomina (Slovenia)

28 March 2012 Quarter-finals - 1st leg	Milan (Italy)	0 – 0	(Spain) Barcelona	San Siro, Milan
20:45 CEST		Report		Attendance: 76,169; Referee: Jonas Eriksson (Sweden)

3 April 2012 Quarter-finals - 2nd leg	Barcelona (Spain)	3 – 1 (3 – 1 agg.)	(Italy) Milan	Camp Nou, Barcelona
20:45 CEST	Messi 11' (pen.), 41' (pen.); Iniesta 53'	Report	Nocerino 32'	Attendance: 94,629; Referee: Björn Kuipers (Netherlands)

=== Internazionale ===
==== UEFA Champions League ====
===== Group stage =====
14 September 2011 Round 1	Internazionale (Italy)	0 – 1	(Turkey) Trabzonspor	San Siro, Milan
20:45 CEST		Report	Čelůstka 76'	Attendance: 24,444; Referee: Stefan Johannesson (Sweden)

27 September 2011 Round 2	CSKA Moscow (Russia)	2 – 3	(Italy) Internazionale	Luzhniki Stadium, Moscow
18:00 CEST	Dzagoev 45+3'; Vágner Love 77'	Report	Lúcio 6'; Pazzini 23'; Zárate 78'	Attendance: 35,000; Referee: Craig Thomson (Scotland)

18 October 2011 Round 3	Lille (France)	0 – 1	(Italy) Internazionale	Stade Lille-Métropole, Villeneuve-d'Ascq
20:45 CEST		Report	Pazzini 21'	Attendance: 16,996; Referee: Howard Webb (England)

2 November 2011 Round 4	Internazionale (Italy)	2 – 1	(France) Lille	San Siro, Milan
20:45 CET	Samuel 18'; Milito 65'	Report	Melo 83'	Attendance: 24,299; Referee: Wolfgang Stark (Germany)

22 November 2011 Round 5	Trabzonspor (Turkey)	1 – 1	(Italy) Internazionale	Hüseyin Avni Aker Stadium, Trabzon
20:45 CET	Altıntop 23'	Report	Álvarez 18'	Attendance: 21,611; Referee: Martin Atkinson (England)

7 December 2011 Round 6	Internazionale (Italy)	1 – 2	(Russia) CSKA Moscow	San Siro, Milan
20:45 CET	Cambiasso 51'	Report	Doumbia 50'; V. Berezutski 86'	Attendance: 23,295; Referee: David Fernández Borbalán (Spain)

===== Knockout phase =====
22 February 2012 Round of 16 - 1st leg	Marseille (France)	1 – 0	(Italy) Internazionale	Stade Vélodrome, Marseille
20:45 CET	A. Ayew 90+3'	Report		Attendance: 37,646; Referee: Cüneyt Çakır (Turkey)

13 March 2012 Round of 16 - 2nd leg	Internazionale (Italy)	2 – 1 (2 – 2a agg.)	(France) Marseille	San Siro, Milan
20:45 CET	Milito 75'; Pazzini 90+6' (pen.)	Report	Brandão 90+2'	Attendance: 62,632; Referee: Pedro Proença (Portugal)

=== Napoli ===
==== UEFA Champions League ====
===== Group stage =====
14 September 2011 Round 1	Manchester City (England)	1 – 1	(Italy) Napoli	Etihad Stadium, Manchester
20:45 CEST	Kolarov 74'	Report	Cavani 69'	Attendance: 44,026; Referee: Jonas Eriksson (Sweden)

27 September 2011 Round 2	Napoli (Italy)	2 – 0	(Spain) Villarreal	Stadio San Paolo, Naples
20:45 CEST	Hamšík 15'; Cavani 17' (pen.)	Report		Attendance: 46,747; Referee: Frank De Bleeckere (Belgium)

18 October 2011 Round 3	Napoli (Italy)	1 – 1	(Germany) Bayern Munich	Stadio San Paolo, Naples
20:45 CEST	Badstuber 39' (o.g.)	Report	Kroos 2'	Attendance: 60,074; Referee: Olegário Benquerença (Portugal)

2 November 2011 Round 4	Bayern Munich (Germany)	3 – 2	(Italy) Napoli	Allianz Arena, Munich
20:45 CET	Gómez 17', 23', 42'	Report	Fernández 45', 79'	Attendance: 66,000; Referee: Björn Kuipers (Netherlands)

22 November 2011 Round 5	Napoli (Italy)	2 – 1	(England) Manchester City	Stadio San Paolo, Naples
20:45 CET	Cavani 17', 49'	Report	Balotelli 33'	Attendance: 57,575; Referee: Damir Skomina (Slovenia)

7 December 2011 Round 6	Villarreal (Spain)	0 – 2	(Italy) Napoli	Estadio El Madrigal, Villarreal
20:45 CET		Report	Inler 65'; Hamšík 76'	Attendance: 15,350; Referee: Svein Oddvar Moen (Norway)

===== Knockout phase =====
21 February 2012 Round of 16 - 1st leg	Napoli (Italy)	3 – 1	(England) Chelsea	Stadio San Paolo, Naples
20:45 CET	Lavezzi 38', 65'; Cavani 45+2'	Report	Mata 27'	Attendance: 52,495; Referee: Carlos Velasco Carballo (Spain)

14 March 2012 Round of 16 - 2nd leg	Chelsea (England)	4 – 1 (a.e.t.) (5 – 4 agg.)	(Italy) Napoli	Stamford Bridge, London
20:45 CET	Drogba 28'; Terry 47'; Lampard 75' (pen.); Ivanović 105'	Report	Inler 55'	Attendance: 37,784; Referee: Felix Brych (Germany)

=== Udinese ===
==== UEFA Champions League ====
===== Play-off round =====
16 August 2011 1st Leg	Arsenal (England)	1 – 0	(Italy) Udinese	Emirates Stadium, London
20:45 CEST	Walcott 4'	Report		Attendance: 58,159; Referee: Kevin Blom (Netherlands)

24 August 2011 2nd Leg	Udinese (Italy)	1 – 2 (1 – 3 agg.)	(England) Arsenal	Stadio Friuli, Udine
20:45 CEST	Di Natale 39'	Report	Van Persie 55'; Walcott 69'	Attendance: 26,031; Referee: Olegário Benquerença (Portugal)

==== UEFA Europa League ====
===== Group stage =====
15 September 2011 Round 1	Udinese (Italy)	2 – 1	(France) Rennes	Stadio Friuli, Udine
21:05 CEST	Di Natale 39'; Armero 83'	Report	Hadji 18'	Referee: Cristian Balaj (Romania)

29 September 2011 Round 2	Celtic (Scotland)	1 – 1	(Italy) Udinese	Celtic Park, Glasgow
19:00 CEST	Ki 3' (pen.)	Report	Abdi 88' (pen.)	Attendance: 28,476; Referee: Bülent Yıldırım (Turkey)

20 October 2011 Round 3	Udinese (Italy)	2 – 0	(Spain) Atlético Madrid	Stadio Friuli, Udine
19:00 CEST	Benatia 88'; Floro Flores 90+3'	Report		Attendance: 10,027; Referee: Alon Yefet (Israel)

3 November 2011 Round 4	Atlético Madrid (Spain)	4 – 0	(Italy) Udinese	Vicente Calderón Stadium, Madrid
21:05 CET	Adrián 6', 12'; Diego 36'; Falcao 67'	Report		Referee: István Vad (Hungary)

30 November 2011 Round 5	Rennes (France)	0 – 0	(Italy) Udinese	Stade de la Route de Lorient, Rennes
19:00 CET		Report		Attendance: 17,428; Referee: Sergei Karasev (Russia)

15 December 2011 Round 6	Udinese (Italy)	1 – 1	(Scotland) Celtic	Stadio Friuli, Udine
21:05 CET	Di Natale 45+1'	Report	Hooper 29'	Attendance: 8,644; Referee: Michael Koukoulakis (Greece)

===== Knockout phase =====
16 February 2012 Round of 32 - 1st leg	Udinese (Italy)	0 – 0	(Greece) PAOK	Stadio Friuli, Udine
21:05 CET		Report		Attendance: 11,641; Referee: Alberto Undiano Mallenco (Spain)

23 February 2012 Round of 32 - 2nd leg	PAOK (Greece)	0 – 3 (0 – 3 agg.)	(Italy) Udinese	Toumba Stadium, Thessaloniki
19:00 CET		Report	Danilo 6'; Floro Flores 15'; Domizzi 51' (pen.)	Attendance: 20,000; Referee: Tom Harald Hagen (Norway)

8 March 2012 Round of 16 - 1st leg	AZ (Netherlands)	2 – 0	(Italy) Udinese	AFAS Stadion, Alkmaar
21:05 CET	Martens 63'; Falkenburg 84'	Report		Attendance: 12,000; Referee: David Fernández Borbalán (Spain)

15 March 2012 Round of 16 - 2nd leg	Udinese (Italy)	2 – 1 (2 – 3 agg.)	(Netherlands) AZ	Stadio Friuli, Udine
19:00 CET	Di Natale 3' (pen.), 15'	Report	Falkenburg 31'	Attendance: 9,500; Referee: Milorad Mažić (Serbia)

=== Lazio ===
==== UEFA Europa League ====
===== Play-off round =====
18 August 2011 1st Leg	Lazio (Italy)	6 – 0	(North Macedonia) Rabotnički	Stadio Olimpico, Rome
20:45 CEST	Hernanes 20'; Mauri 39'; Cissé 51', 65'; Rocchi 87'; Klose 90'	Report		Attendance: 24,532; Referee: Sergei Karasev (Russia)

25 August 2011 2nd Leg	Rabotnički (North Macedonia)	1 – 3 (1 – 9 agg.)	(Italy) Lazio	Philip II Arena, Skopje
20:45 CEST	Lazarevski 39'	Report	Rocchi 23', 77'; Hernanes 74'	Referee: Menashe Masiah (Israel)

===== Group stage =====
15 September 2011 Round 1	Lazio (Italy)	2 – 2	(Romania) Vaslui	Stadio Olimpico, Rome
19:00 CEST	Cissé 35' (pen.); Sculli 71'	Report	Wesley 59', 63' (pen.)	Referee: Eric Braamhaar (Netherlands)

29 September 2011 Round 2	Sporting CP (Portugal)	2 – 1	(Italy) Lazio	Estádio José Alvalade, Lisbon
21:05 CEST	Van Wolfswinkel 21'; Insúa 45+2'	Report	Klose 40'	Attendance: 33,725; Referee: Serge Gumienny (Belgium)

20 October 2011 Round 3	Zürich (Switzerland)	1 – 1	(Italy) Lazio	Letzigrund, Zürich
21:05 CEST	Nikçi 23'	Report	Sculli 22'	Referee: Pawel Gil (Poland)

3 November 2011 Round 4	Lazio (Italy)	1 – 0	(Switzerland) Zürich	Stadio Olimpico, Rome
19:00 CET	Brocchi 62'	Report		Referee: Michael Koukoulakis (Greece)

1 December 2011 Round 5	Vaslui (Romania)	0 – 0	(Italy) Lazio	Stadionul Ceahlăul, Piatra Neamț
21:05 CET		Report		Attendance: 7,000; Referee: Milorad Mažić (Serbia)
Note: Vaslui played their home matches at Stadionul Ceahlăul, Piatra Neamț as their own Stadionul Municipal did not meet UEFA criteria.

14 December 2011 Round 6	Lazio (Italy)	2 – 0	(Portugal) Sporting CP	Stadio Olimpico, Rome
19:00 CET	Kozák 42'; Sculli 55'	Report		Referee: Mike Dean (England)

===== Knockout stage =====
16 February 2012 Round of 32 - 1st Leg	Lazio (Italy)	1 – 3	(Spain) Atlético Madrid	Stadio Olimpico, Rome
19:00 CET	Klose 19'	Report	Adrián 25'; Falcao 37', 63'	Attendance: 30,604; Referee: Pavel Královec (Czech Republic)

23 February 2012 Round of 32 - 2nd Leg	Atlético Madrid (Spain)	1 – 0 (4 – 1 agg.)	(Italy) Lazio	Vicente Calderón Stadium, Madrid
21:05 CET	Godín 48'	Report		Referee: Martin Atkinson (England)

=== Roma ===
==== UEFA Europa League ====
===== Play-off round =====
18 August 2011 1st Leg	Slovan Bratislava (Slovakia)	1 – 0	(Italy) Roma	Štadión Pasienky, Bratislava
20:45 CEST	Dobrotka 80'			Referee: Antonio Mateu Lahoz (Spain)

25 August 2011 2nd Leg	Roma (Italy)	1 – 1	(Slovakia) Slovan Bratislava	Stadio Olimpico, Rome
20:45 CEST	Perrotta 11'	Report	Štepanovský 82'	Referee: Halis Özkahya (Turkey)

Slovan Bratislava won 2–1 on aggregate.

=== Palermo ===
==== UEFA Europa League ====
===== Third qualifying round =====
28 July 2011 1st Leg	Palermo (Italy)	2 – 2	(Switzerland) Thun	Stadio Renzo Barbera, Palermo
20:45 CEST	Iličić 13'; Miccoli 90+2'	Report	Lüthi 6'; Schneider 56'	Attendance: 28,760; Referee: (Serbia) Milorad Mažić

4 August 2011 2nd Leg	Thun (Switzerland)	1 – 1 (3a – 3 agg.)	(Italy) Palermo	Stadion Lachen, Thun
20:45 CEST	Lezcano 65'	Report	González 49'	Attendance: 7,227; Referee: (Israel) Liran Liany
