= Maurizio Lauro =

Italian footballer

Personal information
- Date of birth: 12 March 1981 (age 45)
- Place of birth: Ischia, Italy
- Height: 1.80 m (5 ft 11 in)
- Position: Left back

Youth career
- –2000: Ascoli

Senior career*
Years	Team	Apps	(Gls)
1999–2006	Ascoli	73	(1)
2000–2001	→ Chieti (loan)	32	(1)
2002–2004	→ San Marino (loan)	63	(1)
2005–2006	→ Reggina (loan)	5	(0)
2006–2012	Cesena	122	(0)
2012–2014	Ternana	40	(1)

International career
1997	Italy U16	1	(0)

Managerial career
- 2019–2021: Castelfidardo
- 2021: Mantova
- 2022: Mantova
- 2023: Alessandria
- 2023–2024: Sambenedettese
- * Club domestic league appearances and goals

Maurizio Lauro (born 12 March 1981) is an Italian football coach and a former player who played as a left back.

== Club career ==
=== Ascoli ===
Born in Ischia, Ischia island, Campania, Lauro started his professional career with Marche side Ascoli. After making two league appearances in two seasons for Ascoli's first team, Lauro became a full member of the first team in the 2000–01 season, but for Serie C2 club Chieti. Chieti won the promotion playoffs that season and was promoted. On 1 July 2001, he returned to Ascoli Piceno and played six times in Serie C1. That season Ascoli finished as the Group B champion. Lauro then spent two Serie C2 seasons in San Marino. In the 2004–05 season, he returned to Ascoli and became one of the regular starters. He played 28 times that season and played once in promotion playoffs, as a left-back. In although losing to Torino in aggregate, Ascoli promoted to fill the vacancy due to Caso Genoa and the bankrupt of Torino and Perugia.

Lauro stayed on at Ascoli following the club's promotion to Serie A; however, he later left for fellow Serie A team Reggina on 31 August 2005. In January 2006, Reggina terminated his contract and Lauro returned to Ascoli as an understudy of left back Cristiano Del Grosso. The team finished in tenth place that season. In July 2006, he was transferred to Serie B team Cesena for undisclosed fees.

=== Cesena ===
At Cesena, Lauro became a regular starter of the team, as left back and a center-back (in the first season). He missed two months from late September to October 2007 due to injury. He then returned to his old position – left back on 2 November against Lecce. That season Cesena finished at the bottom. He stayed on as the team was relegated to Lega Pro Prima Divisione in 2008 and promoted back to Serie B in 2009 as champion, and then promoted again to Serie A in 2010 as runner-up. In the 2010–11 season, Cesena signed Yuto Nagatomo as left back, and Lauro played his second Serie A season, again as a backup. After the team failed to win since round 3, Nagatomo was moved to right back to replace Luca Ceccarelli and Lauro became a starting left-back again. In May 2011 he signed a new 2-year contract.

=== Ternana ===
After a six-year playing career at Cesena, Lauro left the club for Serie B team Ternana Calcio on 16 July 2012.

== International career ==
Lauro played once for Italy U16 as part of a friendly match.

== Coaching career ==
The first club he coached was Castelfidardo in Serie D, which he led to 6th place in their group in the 2020–21 season. On 26 June 2021, he was appointed manager of Serie C club Mantova.

On 12 December 2021, Mantova fired him after the team won once in the last seven games. He was successively reinstated as Mantova's head coach on 12 April 2022.

On 16 February 2023, Lauro was appointed new head coach of struggling Serie C club Alessandria until the end of the season. After saving Alessandria through the relegation playoffs, Lauro left the Piedmontese side in order to join Serie D club Sambenedettese. He was dismissed on 4 March 2024, with Sambenedettese in second place in the league table.

== Honours ==
Ascoli

- Lega Pro Prima Divisione: 2002

Cesena

- Lega Pro Prima Divisione: 2009
