= Luca Ricci (Italian footballer) =

Italian footballer

Personal information
- Date of birth: 13 March 1989 (age 37)
- Place of birth: Bibbiena, Italy
- Height: 1.87 m (6 ft 2 in)
- Position: Defender

Team information
- Current team: Turris
- Number: 13

Youth career
- Cesena

Senior career*
Years	Team	Apps	(Gls)
2008–2014	Cesena	9	(0)
2009–2010	→ Pavia (loan)	29	(0)
2010–2011	→ Pergocrema (loan)	33	(2)
2012–2013	→ Ascoli (loan)	36	(1)
2013–2014	→ Varese (loan)	14	(0)
2014–2016	Catanzaro	42	(1)
2015	→ Pistoiese (loan)	12	(0)
2016–2017	Ancona	36	(1)
2017	Monopoli	20	(0)
2018–2019	Carrarese	57	(2)
2019–2021	Cesena	45	(0)
2021–2022	Pistoiese	17	(1)
2022–2023	Viterbese	48	(1)
2023–2024	Recanatese	16	(0)
2024–	Turris	24	(0)

International career
2009–2010	Italy U20	4	(0)
- * Club domestic league appearances and goals as of 18 December 2024

Luca Ricci (born 13 March 1989) is an Italian professional footballer who plays as a defender for Serie D Group H club Turris.

== Career ==
Ricci made his début on 1 June 2008, in a Serie B match against Ravenna.

In 2009–10 season, he was loaned to Pavia for one season, and in the next, to Pergocrema.

On 9 July 2019, he joined Cesena.

On 20 August 2021, he joined Pistoiese.

On 17 January 2022, he moved to Viterbese.
