= Alex Teodorani =

Italian footballer (born 1991)

Personal information
- Date of birth: 21 September 1991 (age 35)
- Place of birth: Rimini, Italy
- Height: 1.91 m (6 ft 3 in)
- Position: Goalkeeper

Youth career
- Cesena

Senior career*
Years	Team	Apps	(Gls)
2011–2014	Cesena	0	(0)
2011	→ Bellaria (loan)	10	(0)
2011–2012	→ SPAL (loan)	10	(0)
2012	→ Carrarese (loan)	2	(0)
2012–2013	→ Pavia (loan)	4	(0)
2013–2014	→ Monza (loan)	2	(0)

International career
2009–2010	Italy U20	3	(0)
- * Club domestic league appearances and goals

Alex Teodorani (born 21 September 1991) is an Italian professional footballer who plays as a goalkeeper.

== Career ==
Born in Rimini, Romagna, Teodorani started his career at A.C. Cesena. On 14 January 2011 he was signed by A.C. Bellaria – Igea Marina, as part of the deal that saw Aldo Junior Simoncini move in the opposite direction. He spent the first half of the following on loan with SPAL 1907, and the second half of the season on loan at Carrarese Calcio. On 9 August 2012, he was signed by A.C. Pavia. On 25 July 2013, Teodorani moved to A.C. Monza–Brianza in another temporary deal.
