= Marco Rigoni =

Italian footballer (born 1980)

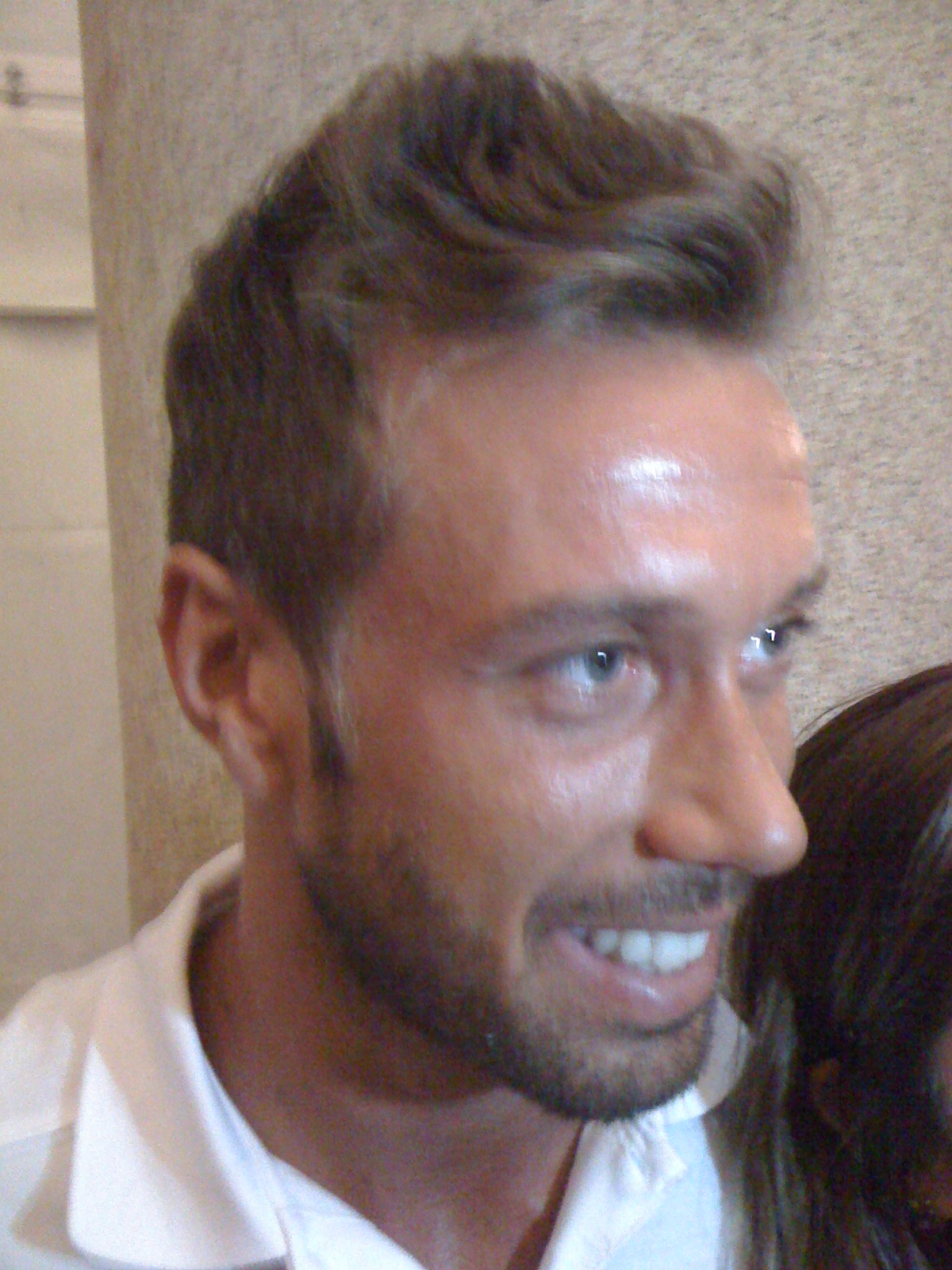

Personal information
- Date of birth: 5 January 1980 (age 46)
- Place of birth: Montegrotto Terme, Italy
- Height: 1.78 m (5 ft 10 in)
- Position: Central midfielder

Youth career
- 1994–1997: Padova
- 1997–2000: Juventus

Senior career*
Years	Team	Apps	(Gls)
1999–2003	Juventus	1	(0)
2001	→ Ravenna (loan)	13	(2)
2002	→ Cittadella (loan)	1	(0)
2003–2006	Triestina	94	(6)
2006–2009	Ternana	67	(16)
2006–2007	→ Pescara (loan)	32	(3)
2009–2014	Novara	135	(23)
2012	→ Chievo (loan)	10	(1)
2013	→ Genoa (loan)	13	(1)

International career
1998	Italy U17	2	(1)
1998	Italy U18	6	(0)
- * Club domestic league appearances and goals as of 13 October 2015

Marco Rigoni (born 5 January 1980) is an Italian retired footballer who played as a midfielder. He played over 150 matches in Serie B.

== Career ==
Born in Montegrotto Terme, Province of Padua, Rigoni started his career at hometown club Padova. He then joined Juventus, at first as a forward, but after just one appearance in Serie A (on 17 January 1999), he was loaned to Ravenna in January 2001 and Cittadella in January 2002 of Serie B, before joining Triestina in January 2003. He terminated his contract with Juve in order to join Triestina.

He played regularly at Triestina, but in January 2006 he was sold to fellow Serie B team Ternana. After the team was relegated to 2006–07 Serie C1, he joined Pescara of Serie B on loan. He went back to Terni in 2007–08 season, but failed to make the club reaching front position.

He was offered a new 2-year contract in 2008.

In summer 2009, he joined Novara of 2009–10 Lega Pro Prima Divisione, rejoining Attilio Tesser his coach at Triestina. He follow the team through 2 consecutive promotion, first to Serie B in 2010 and then to Serie A in 2011. In the 2011–12 Serie A season, Rigoni had arguably his best season as a professional, scoring a team high 11 goals and assisting in 8 others. In May 2012, he scored a hat-trick against A.C. Cesena in a 3–0 home win. Despite Rigoni's efforts, Novara was relegated back down to Serie B that season.

Rigoni was officially loaned to Chievo for the 2012–13 Serie A season, with Chievo having the option to purchase his rights in full at the conclusion of the season.

At international level, he capped for U15, U17 and U18 level. He capped for U18 team at 1999 UEFA European Under-18 Championship qualification.
