= Gianluca Comotto =

Italian footballer

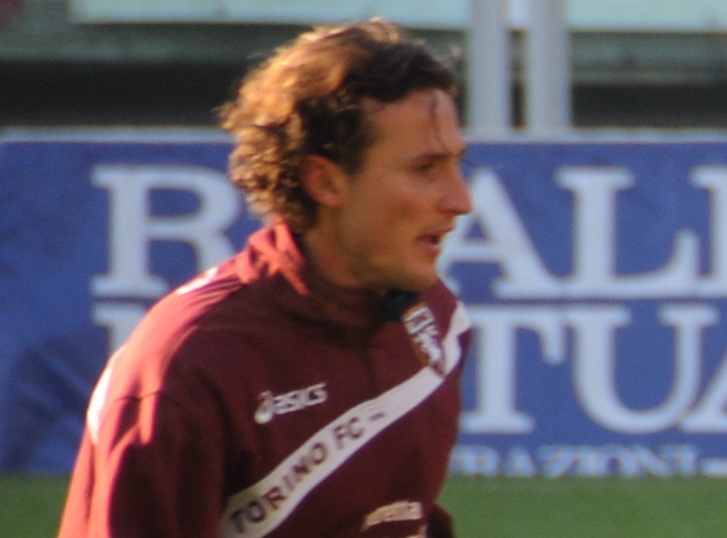

Personal information
- Full name: Gianluca Comotto
- Date of birth: 16 October 1978 (age 48)
- Place of birth: Ivrea, Italy
- Height: 1.82 m (6 ft 0 in)
- Position: Right back

Senior career*
Years	Team	Apps	(Gls)
1994–1996	Ivrea	23	(1)
1996–1997	Biellese	30	(0)
1997–2005	Torino	93	(4)
1999–2001	→ Vicenza (loan)	47	(3)
2003	→ Fiorentina (loan)	15	(0)
2004	→ Reggina (loan)	14	(0)
2005–2006	Roma	0	(0)
2005–2006	→ Ascoli (loan)	31	(3)
2006–2008	Torino	58	(4)
2008–2011	Fiorentina	72	(0)
2011–2013	Cesena	59	(2)
2013–2016	Perugia	60	(0)
- * Club domestic league appearances and goals

Gianluca Comotto (born 16 October 1978) is an Italian retired footballer who played as a defender.

== Club career ==
Comotto started his career at Ivrea of Serie D. He then played one season for Biellese, also in Serie D.

=== Torino ===
He joined Torino in summer 1997, and played 12 games in two Serie B seasons. After Torino won promotion to Serie A, he was farmed to Vicenza, where he won promotion again. He made his Serie A debut while on loan at Vicenza on 1 October 2000, in a match against AC Milan. Comotto returned to Torino in summer 2001, and played his first Serie A season for Torino.

Torino relegated in summer 2003, and Comotto successively played for Reggina (Serie A) and Fiorentina (Serie B), and then returned to Torino in 2004. Comotto helped the team win promotion back to Serie A again.

=== Roma and Return to Turin ===
However, because of the bankruptcy of Torino Calcio, Comotto was released for free in July 2005. Instead of signing a new contract with new Torino (Torino FC) in Serie B, he signed a 3-year contract with AS Roma, worth €600,000 per season in gross, on 18 August, and loaned him to Ascoli until the end of the 2005–06 season. Comotto was re-signed by Torino in summer 2006 in a temporary deal, for €250,000 loan fee. Turin bought back 50% registration rights of Comotto in January 2007 for €1.05 million and Torino got the full rights in June 2007 for another €1.525M, making his transfer fee was €2.825 million in total.

Comotto captained Torino in 2007–08 season, but his season came to early end at March 2008 due to injuries.

=== Fiorentina ===
On 5 July 2008 Comotto signed for Serie A club Fiorentina for €4.8 million (but also cost La Viola an additional €198,000 as other fee) A bad injury excluded Comotto from the Champions league squad list for 2008. He made his Viola debut on 21 September 2008 in Fiorentina-Bologna, which finished 1–0. He also made his debut in the Champions League in the first leg of the qualifiers against Sporting CP on 18 August 2009 in the Stadium Jose Alvalade. He was the starting right-back in 2008–09 and 2009–10 season, but lost his place to Lorenzo De Silvestri in 2010–11 Serie A season. That season he only started 16 times and only re-picked by coach in October after he criticized his squad is a reason for bad results.

=== Cesena ===
On 9 July 2011, Comotto signed a two-year deal with Cesena.

=== Perugia ===
After his contract with Cesena expired, Comotto signed a deal with Perugia, winning his first Lega Pro championship and gaining promotion to 2014–15 Serie B.

== Managerial career ==
Fiorentina sporting director, Panteleo Corvino confirmed that from 4 September 2017, Gianluca Comotto will be appointed as the club's new head of scouting. The club's attention will be turning to finding emerging talent in Portugal and Spain.

In 2020 he moved to Perugia, where he served as general director until 2022.

== Honours ==
Torino

- Serie B runner-up: 1998–99, 2004–05
