= 2008–09 Inter Milan season =

Internazionale
2008–09 season
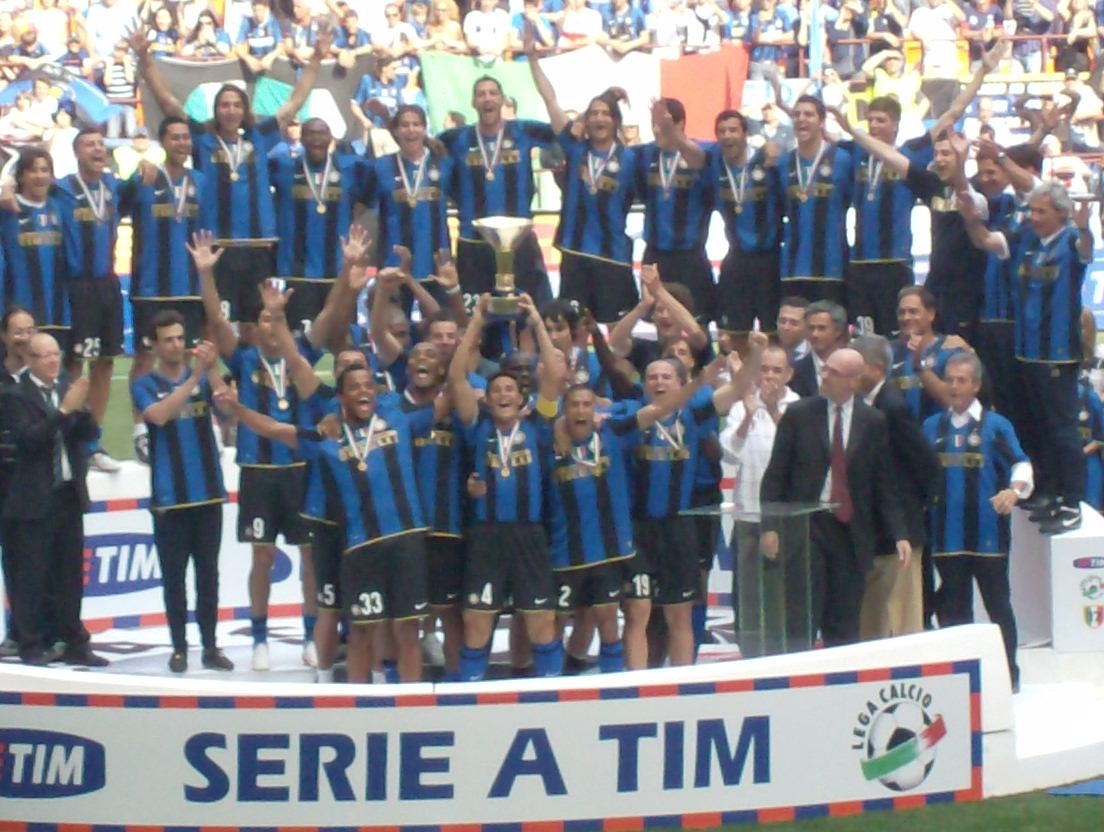
- Inter Milan players celebrating the club's 17th Scudetto
- President: Massimo Moratti
- Head coach: José Mourinho
- Stadium: San Siro
- Serie A: 1st
- Coppa Italia: Semi-finals
- Supercoppa Italiana: Winners
- UEFA Champions League: Round of 16
- Top goalscorer: League: Zlatan Ibrahimović (25); All: Zlatan Ibrahimović (29)
- Highest home attendance: 76,437 vs Juventus (22 November 2008)
- Lowest home attendance: 43,040 vs Torino (1 February 2009)
- Average home league attendance: 55,345
Home colours	Away colours	Third colours

The 2008–09 season was Football Club Internazionale Milano's 100th in existence and 93rd consecutive season in the top flight of Italian football. This was the first season for new Inter manager José Mourinho.

== Season overview ==
After Roberto Mancini's departure, José Mourinho became the new coach of Inter. The Portuguese manager won a trophy at his debut, Supercoppa Italiana, defeating Roma on penalties. He planned to use a 4–3–3 formation, with the new arrivals Amantino Mancini and Quaresma as wingers beside Zlatan Ibrahimović.

As the 4–3–3 soon failed, Mourinho reviewed his ideas, switching to the 4–3–1–2 Mancini had previously used: Stanković acted as playmaker, behind Ibrahimović and his offensive partner (Adriano, rarely Cruz or Crespo, then Balotelli). The performance of the team immediately improved, and Inter once again won the Scudetto (fourth in row), ten points clear of Juventus and Milan.

== Players ==
=== Squad information ===
Squad no.	Name	Nationality	Position	Date of birth (age)
Goalkeepers
1	Francesco Toldo	(Italy)	GK	2 December 1971 (aged 36)
12	Júlio César	(Brazil)	GK	3 September 1979 (aged 28)
22	Paolo Orlandoni	(Italy)	GK	12 August 1972 (aged 35)
Defenders
2	Iván Córdoba (vice-Captain)	(Colombia)	CB	11 August 1976 (aged 31)
4	Javier Zanetti (Captain)	(Argentina)	RB / CM / RM	10 August 1973 (aged 34)
6	Maxwell	(Brazil)	LB	27 August 1981 (aged 26)
13	Maicon	(Brazil)	RB	26 July 1981 (aged 26)
16	Nicolás Burdisso	(Argentina)	CB	12 April 1981 (aged 27)
23	Marco Materazzi	(Italy)	CB	19 August 1973 (aged 34)
24	Nelson Rivas	(Colombia)	CB	25 March 1983 (aged 25)
25	Walter Samuel	(Argentina)	CB	23 March 1978 (aged 30)
26	Cristian Chivu	(Romania)	LB / CB / DM	26 October 1980 (aged 27)
39	Davide Santon	(Italy)	LB	2 January 1991 (aged 17)
Midfielders
5	Dejan Stanković	(Serbia)	CM / AM	11 September 1978 (aged 29)
7	Luís Figo	(Portugal)	RW / AM	4 November 1972 (aged 35)
11	Luis Jiménez	(Chile)	AM / CM / RW	17 June 1984 (aged 24)
14	Patrick Vieira	(France)	DM / CM	23 June 1976 (aged 32)
15	Olivier Dacourt	(France)	DM	25 September 1974 (aged 33)
19	Esteban Cambiasso	(Argentina)	DM / CM	18 August 1980 (aged 27)
20	Sulley Muntari	(Ghana)	CM / DM / LM	27 August 1984 (aged 23)
33	Mancini	(Brazil)	AM / LW / RW	1 August 1980 (aged 27)
Forwards
8	Zlatan Ibrahimović	(Sweden)	CF	3 October 1981 (aged 26)
9	Julio Cruz	(Argentina)	CF	10 July 1974 (aged 34)
18	Hernán Crespo	(Argentina)	CF	5 July 1975 (aged 33)
21	Victor Obinna	(Nigeria)	CF	25 March 1987 (aged 21)
45	Mario Balotelli	(Italy)	CF	12 August 1990 (aged 17)

==== From youth squad ====
Note: Flags indicate national team as defined under FIFA eligibility rules; some limited exceptions apply. Players may hold more than one non-FIFA nationality.

No. / Pos. / Nation / Player; 36 / MF / ITA / Francesco Bolzoni	No. / Pos. / Nation / Player; 38 / DF / ITA / Luca Caldirola

=== Players transfer ===
2008–09 confirmed transfers

==== In ====
No.	Pos.	Nat.	Name	Age	EU	Moving from	Type	Transfer window	Ends	Transfer fee	Source
	FW	(Hungary)	Filkor	19	EU	Grosseto	Loan End	Summer	2010	n/a	
10	FW	(Brazil)	Adriano	26	Non-EU	São Paulo (Brazil)	Loan End	Summer	2010	n/a	Channel 4
	FW	(Italy)	Acquafresca	20	EU	Cagliari	Co-ownership Termination	Summer	undisclosed	undisclosed	
51	DF	(Italy)	Bonucci	21	EU	Treviso	Co-ownership Termination	Summer	undisclosed	undisclosed	
18	FW	(Argentina)	Crespo	33	EU	Free agent	Transfer	Summer	undisclosed	Free	
33	MF	(Brazil)	Mancini	27	EU	Roma	Transfer	Summer	2012	€13M	inter.it
11	MF	(Chile)	Jiménez	24	EU	Ternana	Co-ownership	Summer	2011	undisclosed	inter.it
20	MF	(Ghana)	Muntari	23	Non-EU	Portsmouth (England)	Transfer	Summer	2012	€16M	inter.it
77	MF	(Portugal)	Quaresma	24	EU	Porto (Portugal)	Transfer	Summer	2012	€18.6M + Pélé	inter.it
21	FW	(Nigeria)	Victor Obinna	21	Non-EU	Chievo	Transfer	Summer	2012		
51	DF	(Italy)	Bonucci	21	EU	Treviso	Loan Return	Winter	undisclosed	N/A	
	MF	(Belgium) (Morocco)	Maaroufi	20	EU	Twente (Netherlands)	Loan Return	Winter	2009	N/A	
	GK	(Italy)	Viviano	23	EU	Brescia	Co-ownership	Winter	undisclosed	undisclosed	

Total spending: ▼€46.6 million

==== Out ====
No.	Pos.	Nat.	Name	Age	EU	Moving to	Type	Transfer window	Transfer fee	Source
	DF	(Italy)	Ceccarelli	26	EU	Milan	Co-ownership Termination	Summer		
	DF	(Italy)	Andreolli	23	EU	Roma	Co-ownership Termination	Summer		
	GK	(Italy)	Cordaz	26	EU	Treviso	Co-ownership Termination	Summer		
	MF	(Cameroon)	Maa Boumsong	22	Non-EU	Treviso	Co-ownership Termination	Summer		
	FW	(Nigeria)	Eliakwu	23	Non-EU	Triestina	Co-ownership Termination	Summer		
29	FW	(Honduras)	Suazo	28	EU	Benfica (Portugal)	Loan	Summer	Free	inter.it
28	MF	(Portugal)	Maniche	30	EU	Atlético Madrid (Spain)	Loan End	Summer	Free	
21	MF	(Argentina) (Spain)	Solari	31	EU	San Lorenzo (Argentina)	Contract expired	Summer	Free	
20	MF	(Uruguay)	Recoba	32	EU	Panionios (Greece)	Contract expired	Summer	Free	
31	MF	(Brazil)	César	33	EU	Bologna	Released	Summer	Free	
	MF	(Hungary)	Filkor	19	EU	Sassuolo	Loan	Summer	N/A	
	FW	(Uruguay)	Ribas	20	EU	Dijon (France)	Transfer	Summer	undisclosed	
30	MF	(Portugal)	Pelé	20	EU	Porto (Portugal)	Trade	Summer	Included in Quaresma transfer	inter.it
15	MF	(France)	Dacourt	25	EU	Fulham (England)	Loan	Winter	Free	inter.it
77	MF	(Portugal)	Quaresma	25	EU	Chelsea (England)	Loan	Winter	Free	chelseafc.com
51	DF	(Italy)	Bonucci	21	EU	Pisa	Loan	Winter	N/A	
	MF	(Belgium) (Morocco)	Maaroufi	20	EU	Vicenza	Co-ownership	Winter	undisclosed	
	GK	(Italy)	Viviano	23	EU	Brescia	Loan	Winter	N/A	
10	FW	(Brazil)	Adriano	27	Non-EU	Flamengo (Brazil)	Released	Winter	Free	inter.it

Last updated: 22 May

Total income: ▲€0

=== Start formations ===
Qnt	Formation	Match(es)
17	4-3-3	First 16 matches & match # 22
33	4-1-2-1-2	All other matches

Last updated: 31 May 2009
Source: Match reports in Competitive matches
Only competitive matches.

== Club ==
=== Non-playing staff ===
Position	Staff
Head coach	(Portugal) José Mourinho
Assistant coach	(Italy) Giuseppe Baresi
Technical Assistant	(Portugal) André Villas-Boas
Goalkeeper coach	(Portugal) Silvino Louro
Masseurs/Physiotherapists	(Portugal) Rui Faria
Director in charge of transfers	(Italy) Marco Branca
Transfer Market Consultant; First-Team Representative	(Italy) Gabriele Oriali

Last updated: 5 June 2008
Source: F.C. Internazionale Milano Official Website

== Pre-season and friendlies ==
=== Riscone di Brunico training camp ===
24 July 2008 Friendly	Internazionale	1–0	Al-Hilal	Bruneck
18:00 CET	Burdisso 45'	Report		Stadium: Riscone di Brunico

27 July 2008 Friendly	Internazionale	2–0	Bari	Bruneck
18:00 CET	Cruz 27'; Adriano 34' (pen.)	Report		Stadium: Riscone di Brunico; Referee: Andrea Romeo

=== Tim Trophy ===
29 July 2008 TT	Juventus	1–0	Internazionale	Turin
21:30 CET	Iaquinta 27'	Report		Stadium: Stadio Olimpico; Attendance: 20,000; Referee: Gabriele Gava

29 July 2008 TT	Milan	0–0 (4–3 p)	Internazionale	Turin
22:30 CET		Report		Stadium: Stadio Olimpico; Attendance: 20,000; Referee: Christian Brighi
	Penalties
	Kaká (penalty scored); Oddo (penalty missed); Jankulovski (penalty scored); Favalli (penalty missed); Brocchi (penalty scored); Digão (penalty scored)		(penalty scored) Adriano; (penalty missed) Figo; (penalty scored) Suazo; (penalty missed) Jiménez; (penalty scored) Santon; (penalty missed) Muntari

=== 2008 Amsterdam tournament ===
8 August 2008 Friendly	Internazionale	0–0	Sevilla	Amsterdam, Netherlands
19:00 CET		Report		Stadium: Amsterdam ArenA; Referee: Bas Nijhuis

9 August 2008 Friendly	Ajax	0–1	Internazionale	Amsterdam, Netherlands
21:15 CET		Report	Adriano 5'	Stadium: Amsterdam ArenA; Attendance: 50,000; Referee: Kevin Blom

=== Other friendlies ===
5 August 2008 Friendly	Bayern Munich	0–1	Internazionale	Munich, Germany
20:45 CET		Report	Mancini 52'	Stadium: Allianz Arena; Referee: Felix Brych

15 August 2008 Eusébio Cup	Benfica	0–1 (4–5 p)	Internazionale	Lisbon, Portugal
20:45 CET		Report		Stadium: Estádio da Luz; Attendance: 54,001; Referee: Bruno Paixão
	Penalties
	Aimar (penalty scored); Bastos (penalty missed); Reyes (penalty scored); Nuno Gomes (penalty scored); David Luiz (penalty scored); Nélson (penalty missed)		Maxwell (penalty scored); Balotelli (penalty scored); Stanković (penalty scored); Ibrahimović (penalty missed); Burdisso (penalty scored); Cambiasso (penalty scored)

5 September 2008 Friendly	Locarno	2–2	Internazionale	Locarno, Switzerland
18:00 CET	Sara 41'; Cruz 56' (o.g.)	Report	Córdoba 72'; Cruz 78' (pen.)	Stadium: Stadio del Lido; Referee: Massimo Busacca

== Competitions ==
=== Overview ===
Competition	First match	Last match	Starting round	Final position	Record							
Competition	First match	Last match	Starting round	Final position	Pld	W	D	L	GF	GA	GD	Win %
Serie A	30 August 2008	31 May 2009	Matchday 1	Winners	38	25	9	4	70	32	+38	65.79
Coppa Italia	13 January 2009	23 April 2009	Round of 16	Semi-finals	4	3	0	1	6	5	+1	75.00
Supercoppa Italiana	24 August 2008		Final	Winners	1	1	0	0	2	2	+0	100.00
Champions League	16 September 2008	11 March 2009	Group stage	Round of 16	8	2	3	3	8	9	−1	25.00
Total					51	31	12	8	86	48	+38	60.78

Last updated: 31 May 2009
Source: Soccerway, Calcio

=== Serie A ===
==== League table ====
Pos	Team	Pld	W	D	L	GF	GA	GD	Pts	Qualification or relegation
1	Internazionale (C)	38	25	9	4	70	32	+38	84	Qualification to Champions League group stage
2	Juventus	38	21	11	6	69	37	+32	74 (Note: Juventus finished ahead of Milan on head-to-head points: Juventus 4–2 Milan, Milan 1–1 Juventus.)	Qualification to Champions League group stage
3	Milan	38	22	8	8	70	35	+35	74	Qualification to Champions League group stage
4	Fiorentina	38	21	5	12	53	38	+15	68 (Note: Fiorentina finished ahead of Genoa on head-to-head points: Fiorentina 1–0 Genoa, Genoa 3–3 Fiorentina.)	Qualification to Champions League play-off round
5	Genoa	38	19	11	8	56	39	+17	68	Qualification to Europa League play-off round (Note: Lazio qualified for the play-off round of the 2009–10 UEFA Europa League by winning the 2008–09 Coppa Italia.)

Source: lega-calcio.it (in Italian)
Rules for classification: 1) points; 2) head-to-head points; 3) head-to-head goal difference; 4) head-to-head goals scored; 5) goal difference; 6) number of goals scored.
(C) Champions

==== Results summary ====
Overall								Home						Away					
Pld	W	D	L	GF	GA	GD	Pts	W	D	L	GF	GA	GD	W	D	L	GF	GA	GD
38	25	9	4	70	32	+38	84	14	5	0	37	16	+21	11	4	4	33	16	+17

Last updated: 31 May 2009.
Source: Internazionale Milano

==== Results by round ====
Round	1	2	3	4	5	6	7	8	9	10	11	12	13	14	15	16	17	18	19	20	21	22	23	24	25	26	27	28	29	30	31	32	33	34	35	36	37	38
Ground	A	H	A	H	A	H	A	H	A	A	H	A	H	H	A	H	A	H	A	H	A	H	A	H	A	H	A	H	H	A	H	A	A	H	A	H	A	H
Result	D	W	W	W	L	W	W	D	D	W	W	W	W	W	W	W	W	D	L	W	W	D	W	W	W	D	W	W	W	W	D	D	L	W	D	W	L	W
Position	8	4	1	1	4	3	1	2	4	3	1	1	1	1	1	1	1	1	1	1	1	1	1	1	1	1	1	1	1	1	1	1	1	1	1	1	1	1

Updated to match(es) played on 31 May 2009. Source: Competitive Matches
A = Away; H = Home; W = Win; D = Draw; L = Loss

==== Matches ====
30 August 2008 1	Sampdoria	1–1	Internazionale	Genoa
20:30 CET	Franceschini (yellow card) 59'; Delvecchio 68'; Padalino (yellow card) 77'	Report	Muntari (yellow card) 15'; Ibrahimović 33'; Figo (yellow card) 53'; Stanković (yellow card) 90+3'	Stadium: Stadio Luigi Ferraris; Attendance: 33,975; Referee: Roberto Rosetti

13 September 2008 2	Internazionale	2–1	Catania	Milan
20:30 CET	Quaresma 43'; Muntari (red card) 45'; Terlizzi 49' (o.g.); Vieira (yellow card) 59'; Maicon (yellow card) 84'	Report	Plasmati 42'; Tedesco (yellow card) 45'; Ledesma (yellow card) 61'; Biagianti (yellow card) 66'; Dică (yellow card) 75'; Paolucci (yellow card) 90+3'	Stadium: San Siro; Attendance: 45,809; Referee: Antonio Damato

21 September 2008 3	Torino	1–3	Internazionale	Turin
15:00 CET	P. Zanetti (yellow card) 19'; Pisano (yellow card) 28'; Pratali (yellow card) 78'; Abbruscato 79'	Report	Pisano 24' (o.g.); Maicon 26'; Ibrahimović 51'; Balotelli (yellow card) 74'	Stadium: Stadio Olimpico di Torino; Attendance: 21,497; Referee: Stefano Farina

24 September 2008 4	Internazionale	1–0	Lecce	Milan
20:30 CET	Chivu (yellow card) 43'; Quaresma (yellow card) 57'; Cruz 79'	Report	Esposito (yellow card) 62'	Stadium: San Siro; Attendance: 43,636; Referee: Mauro Bergonzi

28 September 2008 5	Milan	1–0	Internazionale	Milan
20:30 CET	Ronaldinho 36'; Gattuso (yellow card) 41'; Jankulovski (yellow card) 51'	Report	Burdisso (yellow card) 61' (yellow-red card) 77'; Vieira (yellow card) 66'; Quaresma (yellow card) 69'; Zanetti (yellow card) 81'; Materazzi (red card) 83'	Stadium: San Siro; Attendance: 79,057; Referee: Emidio Morganti

4 October 2008 6	Internazionale	2–1	Bologna	Milan
20:30 CET	Ibrahimović 25'; Córdoba (yellow card) 36'; Adriano 50' (pen.); Quaresma (yellow card) 57'	Report	Moras 56' (yellow card) 80'; Marchini (yellow card) 69'	Stadium: San Siro; Attendance: 47,913; Referee: Maurizio Ciampi

19 October 2008 7	Roma	0–4	Internazionale	Rome
20:30 CET	Vučinić (yellow card) 33'	Report	Ibrahimović 5', 47'; Stanković 54'; Obinna 56'; Chivu (yellow card) 76'	Stadium: Stadio Olimpico; Attendance: 48,958; Referee: Nicola Rizzoli

26 October 2008 8	Internazionale	0–0	Genoa	Milan
15:00 CET	Muntari (yellow card) 12'; Maicon (yellow card) 50'; Ibrahimović (yellow card) 55'; Burdisso (yellow card) 69'	Report	Criscito (yellow card) 25'; Ferrari (yellow card) 42'; Motta (yellow card) 55'; Jurić (yellow card) 51' (yellow-red card) 60'	Stadium: San Siro; Attendance: 62,224; Referee: Daniele Orsato

29 October 2008 9	Fiorentina	0–0	Internazionale	Florence
20:30 CET	Krøldrup (yellow card) 53'	Report	Maicon (yellow card) 60'	Stadium: Stadio Artemio Franchi; Attendance: 36,358; Referee: Roberto Rosetti

1 November 2008 10	Reggina	2–3	Internazionale	Reggio Calabria
18:00 CET	Cozza 33'; Barreto (yellow card) 37'; Brienza 53'; Tognozzi (yellow card) 90+2'	Report	Maicon 9'; Vieira 23'; Córdoba (yellow card) 39' (goal) 90+1'	Stadium: Stadio Oreste Granillo; Attendance: 18,059; Referee: Andrea De Marco

9 November 2008 11	Internazionale	1–0	Udinese	Milan
15:00 CET	Cruz (yellow card) 74' (goal) 91+1'; Córdoba (yellow card) 82'	Report	Pepe (yellow card) 33'; D'Agostino (yellow card) 39'; Inler (yellow card) 56'	Stadium: San Siro; Attendance: 51,595; Referee: Emidio Morganti

15 November 2008 12	Palermo	0–2	Internazionale	Palermo
20:30 CET	Bovo (yellow card) 58'; Simplício (yellow card) 75'; Balzaretti (yellow card) 78'	Report	Ibrahimović 46', 62'; Córdoba (yellow card) 65'	Stadium: Stadio Renzo Barbera; Attendance: 34,203; Referee: Paolo Tagliavento

22 November 2008 13	Internazionale	1–0	Juventus	Milan
20:30 CET	Materazzi (yellow card) 50'; Samuel (yellow card) 54'; Muntari 70'; Júlio César (yellow card) 88'	Report	Amauri (yellow card) 25'; Legrottaglie (yellow card) 29'	Stadium: San Siro; Attendance: 76,437; Referee: Nicola Rizzoli

30 November 2008 14	Internazionale	2–1	Napoli	Milan
15:00 CET	Córdoba 16'; Muntari 24'; Zanetti (yellow card) 50'	Report	Lavezzi 36' (yellow card) 80'; Aronica (yellow card) 50'; Rinaudo (yellow card) 63'	Stadium: San Siro; Attendance: 45,595; Referee: Roberto Rosetti

6 December 2008 15	Lazio	0–3	Internazionale	Rome
20:30 CET	Diakité (yellow card) 41'; Zárate (yellow card) 45+2'; Brocchi (yellow card) 76'	Report	Samuel 2'; Stanković (yellow card) 26'; Diakité 45+3' (o.g.); Ibrahimović 55'; Júlio César (yellow card) 59'; Maxwell (yellow card) 90+4'	Stadium: Stadio Olimpico; Attendance: 50,000; Referee: Daniele Orsato

14 December 2008 16	Internazionale	4–2	Chievo Verona	Milan
15:00 CET	Maxwell 3'; Muntari (yellow card) 44'; Stanković (yellow card) 45+2' (goal) 47'; Ibrahimović 79', 88' (yellow card) 84'	Report	Morero (yellow card) 45' (yellow-red card) 82'; Pellissier 51'; Bentivoglio 65'; Mantovani (yellow card) 67'; Yepes (yellow card) 84'	Stadium: San Siro; Attendance: 46,357; Referee: Mauro Bergonzi

20 December 2008 17	Siena	1–2	Internazionale	Siena
20:30 CET	Kharja 44' (yellow card) 79'; Vergassola (yellow card) 77'; Del Grosso (yellow card) 84'	Report	Balotelli (yellow card) 20'; Maicon 34', 83' (yellow card) 84'; Samuel (yellow card) 81'	Stadium: Stadio Artemio Franchi; Attendance: 15,446; Referee: Andrea De Marco

10 January 2009 18	Internazionale	1–1	Cagliari	Milan
20:30 CET	Ibrahimović 77'; Muntari (yellow card) 82'	Report	Acquafresca 65'; Cossu (yellow card) 88'	Stadium: San Siro; Attendance: 45,171; Referee: Nicola Pierpaoli

18 January 2009 19	Atalanta	3–1	Internazionale	Bergamo
15:00 CET	Floccari 18'; Doni 28', 33'; Bellini (yellow card) 67'; Vieri (yellow card) 90+2'	Report	Burdisso (yellow card) 36'; Ibrahimović (yellow card) 45+2' (goal) 90+2'	Stadium: Stadio Atleti Azzurri d'Italia; Attendance: 16,983; Referee: Nicola Rizzoli

25 January 2009 20	Internazionale	1–0	Sampdoria	Milan
20:30 CET	Chivu (yellow card) 10'; Stanković (yellow card) 40'; Adriano 45+1'	Report	Stankevičius (yellow card) 16'; Sammarco (yellow card) 32'; Pazzini (yellow card) 34'; Franceschini (yellow card) 43'	Stadium: San Siro; Attendance: 45,359; Referee: Domenico Celi

28 January 2009 21	Catania	0–2	Internazionale	Catania
20:30 CET	Mascara (yellow card) 12'; Tedesco (yellow card) 60'; D'Amico (yellow card) 90'	Report	Stanković 5'; Muntari (red card) 31'; Ibrahimović (yellow card) 15' (goal) 71'	Stadium: Stadio Angelo Massimino; Attendance: 20,738; Referee: Gianluca Rocchi

1 February 2009 22	Internazionale	1–1	Torino	Milan
15:15 CET	Cruz (yellow card) 18'; Burdisso 58' (yellow card) 59'; Córdoba (yellow card) 79'	Report	Ogbonna (yellow card) 37'; Bianchi 47'	Stadium: San Siro; Attendance: 43,040; Referee: Mauro Bergonzi

7 February 2009 23	Lecce	0–3	Internazionale	Lecce
18:00 CET	Esposito (yellow card) 47'; Tiribocchi (yellow card) 55'; Caserta (yellow card) 77'	Report	Ibrahimović 12' (yellow card) 38'; Figo 71'; Stanković 82'; Balotelli (yellow card) 89'	Stadium: Stadio Via del Mare; Attendance: 26,669; Referee: Paolo Tagliavento

15 February 2009 24	Internazionale	2–1	Milan	Milan
20:30 CET	Adriano 29'; Stanković 43'; Samuel (yellow card) 47'; Cambiasso (yellow card) 70'; Burdisso (yellow card) 85'; Vieira (yellow card) 88'; Chivu (yellow card) 90+2'	Report	Ambrosini (yellow card) 45'; Pato 71'	Stadium: San Siro; Attendance: 76,178; Referee: Roberto Rosetti

21 February 2009 25	Bologna	1–2	Internazionale	Bologna
16:00 CET	Moras (yellow card) 30'; Britos 79'; Zenoni (yellow card) 81'	Report	Cambiasso 57'; Balotelli 82'; Rivas (yellow card) 83'	Stadium: Stadio Renato Dall'Ara; Attendance: 34,571; Referee: Nicola Ayroldi

1 March 2009 26	Internazionale	3–3	Roma	Milan
20:30 CET	Zanetti (yellow card) 37'; Balotelli 50', 63' (pen.); Stanković (yellow card) 67'; Crespo 79'; Vieira (yellow card) 83'	Report	De Rossi 23' (yellow card) 68'; Riise 29' (yellow card) 77'; Pizarro (yellow card) 45+1'; Brighi 57'	Stadium: San Siro; Attendance: 51,497; Referee: Nicola Rizzoli

7 March 2009 27	Genoa	0–2	Internazionale	Genoa
18:00 CET	Milito (yellow card) 22'; Motta (yellow card) 52'; Biava (yellow card) 59'; Ferrari (yellow card) 71'	Report	Ibrahimović 2' (yellow card) 45+2'; Balotelli 61' (yellow card) 73'; Mancini (yellow card) 84'	Stadium: Stadio Luigi Ferraris; Attendance: 32,332; Referee: Emidio Morganti

15 March 2009 28	Internazionale	2–0	Fiorentina	Milan
20:30 CET	Ibrahimović 11', 90+4'; Balotelli (yellow card) 33'; Samuel (yellow card) 42'; Muntari (yellow card) 50'; Júlio César (yellow card) 71'	Report	Felipe Melo (yellow card) 49'	Stadium: San Siro; Attendance: 51,535; Referee: Daniele Orsato

22 March 2009 29	Internazionale	3–0	Reggina	Milan
15:00 CET	Cambiasso 6'; Ibrahimović 10' (pen.), 58'; Santon (yellow card) 51'	Report	Valdez (yellow card) 10'; Barillà (yellow card) 26'; Carmona (yellow card) 68'	Stadium: San Siro; Attendance: 52,025; Referee: Paolo Mazzoleni

5 April 2009 30	Udinese	0–1	Internazionale	Udine
19:00 CET	Quagliarella (yellow card) 22'; Pepe (yellow card) 77'	Report	Maxwell (yellow card) 41'; Vieira (yellow card) 69'; Isla 77' (o.g.)	Stadium: Stadio Friuli; Attendance: 25,930; Referee: Luca Banti

11 April 2009 31	Internazionale	2–2	Palermo	Milan
15:00 CET	Balotelli 15'; Ibrahimović 39' (pen.); Stanković (yellow card) 64'; Chivu (yellow card) 88'	Report	Bovo (yellow card) 45+2'; Cavani 73'; Miccoli (yellow card) 76'; Succi 76' (yellow card) 76'; Simplício (yellow card) 90'	Stadium: San Siro; Attendance: 65,702; Referee: Carmine Russo

18 April 2009 32	Juventus	1–1	Internazionale	Turin
20:30 CET	Legrottaglie (yellow card) 36'; Poulsen (yellow card) 54'; Tiago (red card) 76'; Grygera 90+1'	Report	Figo (yellow card) 3'; Balotelli 64' (yellow card) 68'	Stadium: Stadio Olimpico di Torino; Attendance: 24,790; Referee: Stefano Farina

26 April 2009 33	Napoli	1–0	Internazionale	Naples
20:30 CET	Amodio (yellow card) 19'; Zalayeta 73'; Lavezzi (yellow card) 82'	Report	Vieira (yellow card) 13'; Cruz (yellow card) 82'; Balotelli (yellow card) 83'; Stanković (yellow card) 87'	Stadium: Stadio San Paolo; Attendance: 53,772; Referee: Roberto Rosetti

2 May 2009 34	Internazionale	2–0	Lazio	Milan
20:30 CET	Samuel (yellow card) 26'; Ibrahimović 58' (yellow card) 86'; Muntari 70'; Vieira (yellow card) 82'; Chivu (yellow card) 90+1'	Report	Del Nero (yellow card) 44'; Matuzalém (yellow card) 86'; Ledesma (yellow card) 89'	Stadium: San Siro; Attendance: 58,576; Referee: Paolo Tagliavento

10 May 2009 35	Chievo Verona	2–2	Internazionale	Verona
15:00 CET	Marcolini 27'; Morero (yellow card) 37'; Rigoni (yellow card) 40'; Luciano 73'; Malagò (yellow card) 88'	Report	Crespo 3'; Córdoba (yellow card) 32'; Balotelli 65'; Cruz (yellow card) 85'	Stadium: Stadio Marc'Antonio Bentegodi; Attendance: 28,924; Referee: Andrea De Marco

17 May 2009 36	Internazionale	3–0	Siena	Milan
20:30 CET	Cambiasso 45'; Balotelli 52'; Ibrahimović 76'	Report		Stadium: San Siro; Attendance: 73,492; Referee: Mauro Bergonzi

24 May 2009 37	Cagliari	2–1	Internazionale	Cagliari
15:00 CET	Cossu 34' (yellow card) 35'; Acquafresca 71'	Report	Ibrahimović 8'; Chivu (yellow card) 73'	Stadium: Stadio Sant'Elia; Attendance: 20,000; Referee: Gianpaolo Calvarese

31 May 2009 38	Internazionale	4–3	Atalanta	Milan
15:00 CET	Muntari 6'; Ibrahimović 12', 81' (yellow card) 81'; Stanković (yellow card) 56'; Cambiasso 80'	Report	Doni 10', 53'; Cigarini 25'	Stadium: San Siro; Attendance: 69,405; Referee: Gianluca Rocchi

=== Coppa Italia ===
==== Round of 16 ====
13 January 2009 Round of 16	Internazionale	3–1 (a.e.t.)	Genoa	Milan
21:00	Muntari (yellow card) 34'; Adriano 76'; Cambiasso 100'; Obinna (yellow card) 102'; Ibrahimović 104'	Report	Jurić (yellow card) 27'; Rossi 79'; Milanetto (yellow card) 83'; Scarpi (yellow card) 86'; Biava (red card) 110'	Stadium: San Siro; Attendance: 6,623; Referee: Gabriele Gava

==== Quarter-finals ====
21 January 2009 Quarter-final	Internazionale	2–1	Roma	Milan
21:00	Adriano 10'; Samuel (yellow card) 23'; Ibrahimović 62'	Report	Juan (yellow card) 8'; Vučinić (yellow card) 10'; Perrotta (yellow card) 45+1'; Taddei 61'; Mexès (yellow card) 83'	Stadium: San Siro; Attendance: 26,520; Referee: Daniele Orsato

==== Semi-finals ====
4 March 2009 First leg	Sampdoria	3–0	Internazionale	Genoa
20:45 (CET)	Cassano 9'; Gastaldello (yellow card) 25' (yellow-red card) 59'; Pazzini 30', 42'	Report	Córdoba (yellow card) 53'; Balotelli (yellow card) 57'; Materazzi (yellow card) 87'; Zanetti (yellow card) 87'	Stadium: Stadio Luigi Ferraris; Attendance: 14,185; Referee: Massimiliano Saccani

23 April 2009 Second leg	Internazionale	1–0 (1–3 agg.)	Sampdoria	Milan
20:45 (CET)	Córdoba (yellow card) 22'; Ibrahimović 28' (yellow card) 32'; Zanetti (yellow card) 79'; Chivu (yellow card) 81'; Materazzi (yellow card) 90+4' (yellow-red card) 90+4'	Report	Accardi (yellow card) 60'; Raggi (yellow card) 63'; Pazzini (yellow card) 88'	Stadium: San Siro; Attendance: 41,138; Referee: Daniele Orsato

=== Supercoppa Italiana ===
24 August 2008 Final	Internazionale	2–2 (a.e.t.) (6–5 p)	Roma	Milan
20:45 CET	Stanković (yellow card) 15'; Muntari 18'; Ibrahimović (yellow card) 40'; Balotelli 83' (yellow card) 105'	Report	Vučinić (yellow card) 12' (goal) 90'; Pizarro (yellow card) 31'; De Rossi 59'; Cassetti (yellow card) 85'	Stadium: San Siro; Attendance: 43,400; Referee: Massimiliano Saccani
	Penalties
	Ibrahimović (penalty scored); Balotelli (penalty scored); Stanković (penalty missed); Maxwell (penalty scored); Cambiasso (penalty scored); Jiménez (penalty scored); Zanetti (penalty scored)		(penalty scored) Vučinić; (penalty scored) Baptista; (penalty scored) Cassetti; (penalty scored) De Rossi; (penalty missed) Totti; (penalty scored) Pizarro; (penalty missed) Juan

=== UEFA Champions League ===
==== Group stage ====
Pos	Team	Pld	W	D	L	GF	GA	GD	Pts	Qualification
1	(Greece) Panathinaikos	6	3	1	2	8	7	+1	10	Advance to knockout phase
2	(Italy) Internazionale	6	2	2	2	8	7	+1	8	Advance to knockout phase
3	(Germany) Werder Bremen	6	1	4	1	7	9	−2	7	Transfer to UEFA Cup
4	(Cyprus) Anorthosis Famagusta	6	1	3	2	8	8	0	6	

Source: RSSSF

16 September 2008 1	Panathinaikos (Greece)	0–2	(Italy) Internazionale	Athens, Greece
20:45 CET	Cleyton (yellow card) 33'	Report	Materazzi (yellow card) 22'; Mancini 27'; Maicon (yellow card) 46'; Adriano 85'	Stadium: Olympic Stadium; Attendance: 58,378; Referee: Manuel Mejuto González (Spain)

1 October 2008 2	Internazionale (Italy)	1–1	(Germany) Werder Bremen	Milan, Italy
20:45 CET	Maicon 13'; Stanković (yellow card) 60'; Cruz (yellow card) 81'	Report	Baumann (yellow card) 21'; Diego (yellow card) 53'; Pizarro 67'; Frings (yellow card) 68'; Jensen (yellow card) 83'	Stadium: San Siro; Attendance: 76,583; Referee: Ľuboš Micheľ (Slovakia)

22 October 2008 3	Internazionale (Italy)	1–0	(Cyprus) Anorthosis	Milan, Italy
20:45 CET	Adriano 44'	Report	Katsavakis (yellow card) 62'	Stadium: San Siro; Attendance: 45,021; Referee: Howard Webb (England)

4 November 2008 4	Anorthosis (Cyprus)	3–3	(Italy) Internazionale	Nicosia, Cyprus
20:45 CET	Bardon 31'; Panagi 45+1'; Frousos 50'	Report	Balotelli 13'; Materazzi 44'; Cruz 80'	Stadium: GSP Stadium; Attendance: 17,140; Referee: Laurent Duhamel (France)

26 November 2008 5	Internazionale (Italy)	0–1	(Greece) Panathinaikos	Milan, Italy
20:45 CET		Report	Sarriegi 69'; Galinović (yellow card) 89'; Goumas (yellow card) 90+3'	Stadium: San Siro; Attendance: 34,955; Referee: Tom Henning Øvrebø (Norway)

9 December 2008 6	Werder Bremen (Germany)	2–1	(Italy) Internazionale	Bremen, Germany
20:45 CET	Frings (yellow card) 28'; Pizarro 63'; Rosenberg 81'; Fritz (yellow card) 84'	Report	Muntari (yellow card) 69'; Ibrahimović 88'; Balotelli (yellow card) 88'	Stadium: Weserstadion; Attendance: 35,000; Referee: Pieter Vink (Netherlands)

==== Knockout phase ====
===== Round of 16 =====
24 February 2009 First leg	Internazionale (Italy)	0–0	(England) Manchester United	Milan, Italy
20:45 CET	Toldo (yellow card) 44'; Chivu (yellow card) 57'; Maicon (yellow card) 59'; Córdoba (yellow card) 90+3'	Report	Fletcher (yellow card) 72'; Rooney (yellow card) 88'	Stadium: San Siro; Attendance: 80,018; Referee: Luis Medina Cantalejo (Spain)

11 March 2009 Second leg	Manchester United (England)	2–0 (2–0 agg.)	(Italy) Internazionale	Manchester, England
20:45 CET	Vidić 4'; Ronaldo 49'; Rooney (yellow card) 71'	Report	Samuel (yellow card) 53'; Muntari (yellow card) 77'	Stadium: Old Trafford; Attendance: 74,769; Referee: Wolfgang Stark (Germany)

== Statistics ==
=== Squad statistics ===
	League	Europe	Cup	Others	Total Stats
Games played	38	8	4	1	51
Games won	25	2	3	0	30
Games drawn	9	3	0	1	13
Games lost	4	3	1	0	8
Goals scored	70	8	6	2	86
Goals conceded	32	9	5	2	48
Goal difference	38	-1	1	0	38
Clean sheets	17	3	1	0	21
Goal by substitute	–	–	–	–	–
Total shots	–	–	–	–	–
Shots on target	–	–	–	–	–
Corners	–	–	–	–	–
Players used	29	23	24	14	–
Offsides	–	–	–	–	–
Fouls suffered	–	–	–	–	–
Fouls committed	–	–	–	–	–
Yellow cards	82	11	12	3	108
Red cards	4	1	–	–	5

Last updated: 5 August 2008
Source: Serie A statistics, UEFA Champions League statistics, Coppa Italia statistics

Players Used: Internazionale has used a total of – different players in all competitions.

=== Appearances and goals ===
No.	Pos	Nat	Player	Total		Serie A		Coppa		Champions League	
No.	Pos	Nat	Player	Apps	Goals	Apps	Goals	Apps	Goals	Apps	Goals
12	GK	(Brazil) BRA	Júlio César	44	0	36	0	1	0	7	0
13	DF	(Brazil) BRA	Maicon	40	5	27+2	4	2+1	0	8	1
2	DF	(Colombia) COL	Cordoba	37	2	26+2	2	2	0	6+1	0
26	DF	(Romania) ROU	Chivu	26	0	20+1	0	1+2	0	2	0
6	DF	(Brazil) BRA	Maxwell	32	1	19+6	1	3	0	2+2	0
4	MF	(Argentina) ARG	Zanetti J	50	0	37+1	0	4	0	8	0
19	MF	(Argentina) ARG	Cambiasso	46	5	33+2	4	1+2	1	8	0
20	MF	(Ghana) GHA	Muntari	37	4	26+1	4	3	0	5+2	0
5	MF	(Serbia) SRB	Stankovic	37	5	26+5	5	1	0	5	0
8	FW	(Sweden) SWE	Ibrahimovic	46	29	35	25	2+1	3	7+1	1
45	FW	(Italy) ITA	Balotelli	30	9	15+7	8	2	0	3+3	1
1	GK	(Italy) ITA	Toldo	7	0	2+1	0	3	0	1	0
25	DF	(Argentina) ARG	Samuel	20	1	17	1	2	0	1	0
39	DF	(Italy) ITA	Santon	20	0	14+2	0	2	0	2	0
16	DF	(Argentina) ARG	Burdisso	28	1	13+8	1	3	0	2+2	0
7	MF	(Portugal) POR	Figo	25	1	11+11	1	0	0	1+2	0
33	MF	(Brazil) BRA	Mancini	26	1	10+10	0	1+1	0	4	1
14	MF	(France) FRA	Vieira	24	1	10+9	1	2	0	2+1	0
23	DF	(Italy) ITA	Materazzi	15	1	8	0	2	0	5	1
9	FW	(Argentina) ARG	Julio Cruz	23	3	7+10	2	1	0	0+5	1
21	FW	(Nigeria) NGR	Obinna	11	1	3+6	1	0+2	0	0	0
24	DF	(Colombia) COL	Rivas	7	0	3+2	0	1	0	1	0
18	FW	(Argentina) ARG	Crespo	17	2	2+12	2	1+2	0	0	0
11	MF	(Chile) CHI	Jiménez	7	0	2+4	0	1	0	0	0
22	GK	(Italy) ITA	Orlandoni	1	0	0+1	0	0	0	0	0
36	MF	(Italy) ITA	Bolzoni	1	0	0+1	0	0	0	0	0
Players transferred out during the season
10	FW	(Brazil) BRA	Adriano	22	7	9+3	3	3	2	5+2	2
15	MF	(France) FRA	Dacourt	1	0	0+1	0	0	0	0	0
77	MF	(Portugal) POR	Quaresma	19	1	7+6	1	0	0	3+3	0

Last updated: 31 June 2009
Source: Competitions

=== Goalscorers ===
No.	Pos.	Nation	Name	Serie A	Champions League	Coppa Italia	Supercoppa Italiana	Total
8	FW	(Sweden)	Zlatan Ibrahimović	25	1	3	0	29
45	FW	(Italy)	Mario Balotelli	8	1	0	1	10
10	FW	(Brazil)	Adriano	3	2	2	0	7
5	MF	(Serbia)	Dejan Stanković	5	0	0	0	5
13	DF	(Brazil)	Maicon	4	1	0	0	5
19	MF	(Argentina)	Esteban Cambiasso	4	0	1	0	5
20	MF	(Ghana)	Sulley Muntari	4	0	0	1	5
#	Own goals			4	0	0	0	4
9	FW	(Argentina)	Julio Cruz	2	1	0	0	3
2	DF	(Colombia)	Iván Córdoba	2	0	0	0	2
18	FW	(Argentina)	Hernán Crespo	2	0	0	0	2
7	MF	(Portugal)	Luís Figo	1	0	0	0	1
14	MF	(France)	Patrick Vieira	1	0	0	0	1
16	DF	(Argentina)	Nicolás Burdisso	1	0	0	0	1
21	FW	(Nigeria)	Victor Obinna	1	0	0	0	1
23	DF	(Italy)	Marco Materazzi	0	1	0	0	1
25	DF	(Argentina)	Walter Samuel	1	0	0	0	1
33	MF	(Brazil)	Mancini	0	1	0	0	1
77	MF	(Portugal)	Ricardo Quaresma	1	0	0	0	1
TOTAL				70	8	6	2	86

Last updated: 31 May 2009

=== Assists ===
No.	Pos.	Nation	Name	Serie A	Champions League	Coppa Italia	Supercoppa Italiana	Total
8	FW	(Sweden)	Zlatan Ibrahimović	7	2	0	0	9
13	DF	(Brazil)	Maicon	6	1	0	0	7
20	MF	(Ghana)	Sulley Muntari	7	0	0	0	7
5	MF	(Serbia)	Dejan Stanković	6	0	0	0	6
10	FW	(Brazil)	Adriano	3	1	0	0	4
18	FW	(Argentina)	Hernán Crespo	3	0	0	0	3
19	MF	(Argentina)	Esteban Cambiasso	3	0	0	0	3
33	MF	(Brazil)	Mancini	3	0	0	0	3
45	FW	(Italy)	Mario Balotelli	1	2	0	0	3
6	DF	(Brazil)	Maxwell	0	1	1	0	2
9	FW	(Argentina)	Julio Cruz	2	0	0	0	2
39	DF	(Italy)	Davide Santon	2	0	0	0	2
77	MF	(Portugal)	Ricardo Quaresma	2	0	0	0	2
2	DF	(Colombia)	Iván Córdoba	1	0	0	0	1
7	MF	(Portugal)	Luís Figo	1	0	0	0	1
11	MF	(Chile)	Luis Jiménez	1	0	0	0	1
14	MF	(France)	Patrick Vieira	1	0	0	0	1
TOTAL				49	6	1	0	56

Last updated: 31 May 2009

=== Clean sheets ===
The list is sorted by shirt number when total appearances are equal.

Rnk	No.	Player	Serie A	Champions League	Coppa Italia	Supercoppa Italiana	Total
1	1	(Brazil) Júlio César	17	3	1	0	21
2	1	(Italy) Francesco Toldo	1	1	0	0	2
3	22	(Italy) Paolo Orlandoni	1	0	0	0	1
Total			9	1	0	4	14

Last updated: 31 May 2009.
Source: Internazionale

=== Disciplinary record ===
No.	Pos	Nat	Player	Serie A			UEFA CL			Coppa Italia			Supercoppa			Total		
No.	Pos	Nat	Player	Yellow card	(yellow card) (yellow-red card)	Red card	Yellow card	(yellow card) (yellow-red card)	Red card	Yellow card	(yellow card) (yellow-red card)	Red card	Yellow card	(yellow card) (yellow-red card)	Red card	Yellow card	(yellow card) (yellow-red card)	Red card
1	GK	(Italy)	Francesco Toldo	0	0	0	1	0	0	0	0	0	0	0	0	1	0	0
12	GK	(Brazil)	Júlio César	3	0	0	0	0	0	0	0	0	0	0	0	3	0	0
22	GK	(Italy)	Paolo Orlandoni	0	0	0	0	0	0	0	0	0	0	0	0	0	0	0
2	DF	(Colombia)	Iván Córdoba	6	0	0	1	0	0	2	0	0	0	0	0	9	0	0
4	DF	(Argentina)	Javier Zanetti	3	0	0	0	0	0	2	0	0	0	0	0	5	0	0
13	DF	(Brazil)	Maicon	4	0	0	2	0	0	0	0	0	0	0	0	6	0	0
16	DF	(Argentina)	Nicolás Burdisso	5	1	0	0	0	0	0	0	0	0	0	0	5	1	0
23	DF	(Italy)	Marco Materazzi	1	0	1	1	0	0	2	1	0	0	0	0	4	1	1
24	DF	(Colombia)	Nelson Rivas	1	0	0	0	0	0	0	0	0	0	0	0	1	0	0
25	DF	(Argentina)	Walter Samuel	5	0	0	1	0	0	1	0	0	0	0	0	7	0	0
26	DF	(Romania)	Cristian Chivu	7	0	0	1	0	0	1	0	0	0	0	0	9	0	0
39	DF	(Italy)	Davide Santon	2	0	0	0	0	0	0	0	0	0	0	0	2	0	0
5	MF	(Serbia)	Dejan Stanković	8	0	0	1	0	0	0	0	0	1	0	0	10	0	0
7	MF	(Portugal)	Luís Figo	2	0	0	0	0	0	0	0	0	0	0	0	2	0	0
11	MF	(Chile)	Luis Jiménez	0	0	0	0	0	0	0	0	0	0	0	0	0	0	0
14	MF	(France)	Patrick Vieira	7	0	0	0	0	0	0	0	0	0	0	0	7	0	0
15	MF	(France)	Olivier Dacourt	0	0	0	0	0	0	0	0	0	0	0	0	0	0	0
19	MF	(Argentina)	Esteban Cambiasso	1	0	0	0	0	0	0	0	0	0	0	0	1	0	0
20	MF	(Ghana)	Sulley Muntari	5	0	2	2	0	0	1	0	0	0	0	0	8	0	2
33	MF	(Brazil)	Mancini	1	0	0	0	0	0	0	0	0	0	0	0	1	0	0
36	MF	(Italy)	Francesco Bolzoni	0	0	0	0	0	0	0	0	0	0	0	0	0	0	0
77	MF	(Portugal)	Ricardo Quaresma	3	0	0	0	0	0	0	0	0	0	0	0	3	0	0
8	FW	(Sweden)	Zlatan Ibrahimović	8	0	0	0	0	0	1	0	0	1	0	0	10	0	0
9	FW	(Argentina)	Julio Cruz	4	0	0	1	0	0	0	0	0	0	0	0	5	0	0
10	FW	(Brazil)	Adriano	0	0	0	0	0	0	0	0	0	0	0	0	0	0	0
18	FW	(Argentina)	Hernán Crespo	0	0	0	0	0	0	0	0	0	0	0	0	0	0	0
21	FW	(Nigeria)	Victor Obinna	0	0	0	0	0	0	1	0	0	0	0	0	1	0	0
45	FW	(Italy)	Mario Balotelli	7	0	0	1	0	0	1	0	0	1	0	0	10	0	0
Totals				83	1	3	12	0	0	12	1	0	3	0	0	110	2	3

Last updated: 31 May 2009
