= Paolo Orlandoni =

Italian footballer and coach (born 1972)

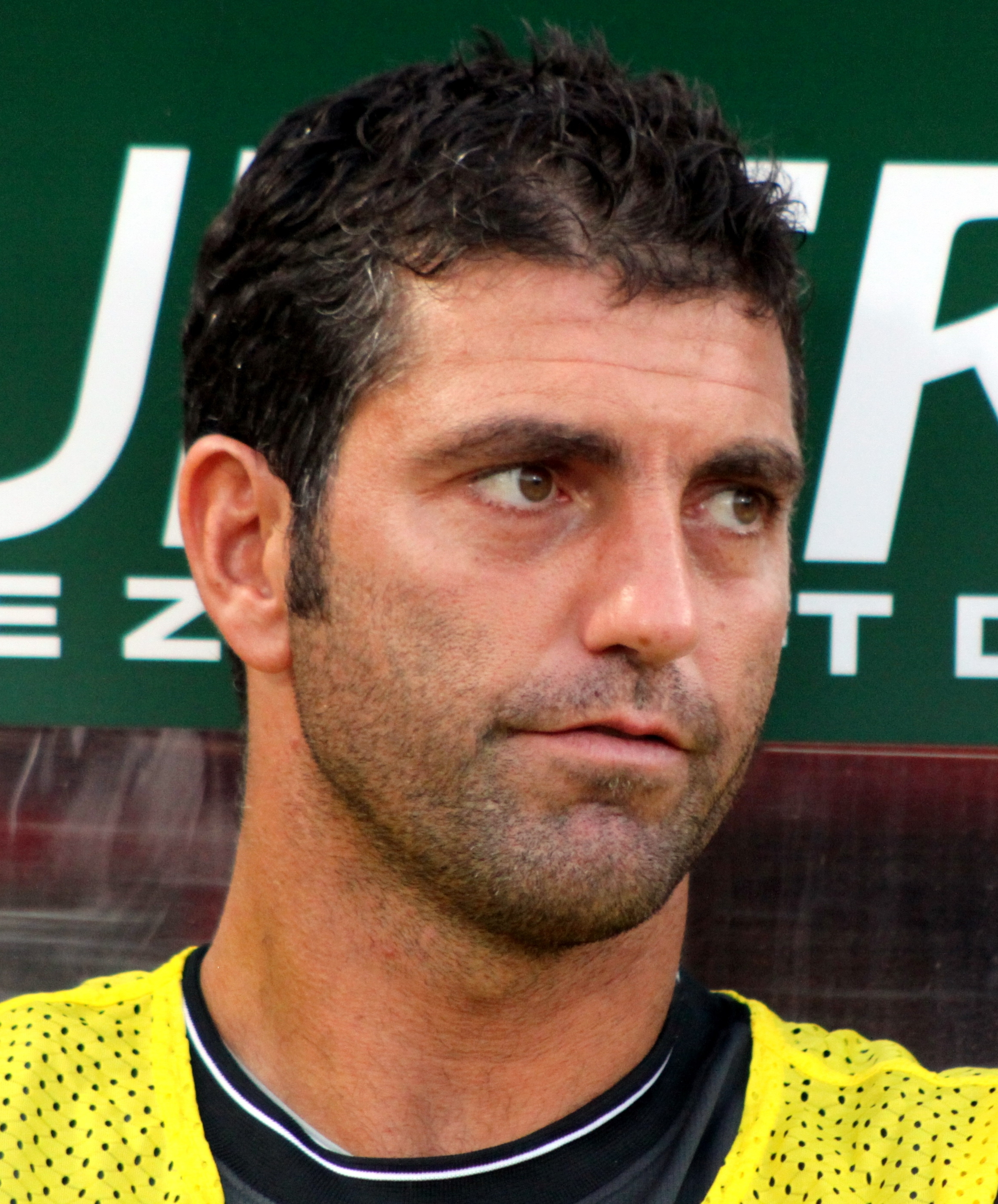
- Orlandoni with Inter Milan in 2009

Personal information
- Full name: Paolo Orlandoni
- Date of birth: 12 August 1972 (age 54)
- Place of birth: Bolzano, Italy
- Height: 1.86 m (6 ft 1 in)
- Position: Goalkeeper

Team information
- Current team: Inter Milan (goalkeeper coach)

Youth career
- 1986–1990: Inter Milan

Senior career*
Years	Team	Apps	(Gls)
1988–1998	Inter Milan	0	(0)
1991–1992	→ Mantova (loan)	8	(0)
1992–1993	→ Leffe (loan)	8	(0)
1993–1994	→ Casarano (loan)	23	(0)
1994–1995	→ Pro Sesto (loan)	25	(0)
1995–1996	→ Ancona (loan)	14	(0)
1996–1997	→ Foggia (loan)	1	(0)
1997–1998	→ Acireale (loan)	28	(0)
1998–2000	Reggina	47	(0)
2000	→ Bologna (loan)	3	(0)
2000–2001	Lazio	1	(0)
2001–2005	Piacenza	64	(0)
2005–2012	Inter Milan	4	(0)
Total		226	(0)

Managerial career
- 2012–2015: Inter Primavera (goalkeeper coach)
- 2015–2017: Fenerbahçe (goalkeeper coach)
- 2017–2018: FC Nantes (goalkeeper coach)
- 2018–2019: Fulham (goalkeeper coach)
- 2019–2020: Inter Primavera (goalkeeper coach)
- 2020–2021: Cagliari (goalkeeper coach)
- 2021–2025: Sassuolo (goalkeeper coach)
- 2025–: Inter Milan (goalkeeper coach)
- * Club domestic league appearances and goals

Paolo Orlandoni (born 12 August 1972) is an Italian former professional footballer who played as a goalkeeper. He is the current goalkeeper coach for Inter Milan.

== Club career ==
He started his career at Internazionale, then playing on loan for a number of Serie B and Serie C1 teams (Mantova, AlbinoLeffe, Casarano, Pro Sesto, Ancona, Foggia, Acireale) until 1998. In July 1998, he was acquired by Reggina, where he was featured as a regular and became instrumental in the club's first promotion ever to the Serie A league in 1999. Orlandoni left Reggina in January 2000 to join Bologna on loan; he then returned to Reggina in September 2000, never playing again for his team, and was subsequently sold to Lazio where he was featured as a second-choice goalkeeper.

From 2001 to 2005, he played for Piacenza, first as backup keeper, then as a regular in his final season with the club. In July 2005, Orlandoni returned to Inter, signing a two-year contract as a third-choice goalkeeper behind Francesco Toldo and Júlio César, making his debut for the Nerazzurri on 14 May 2006 in a league game versus Cagliari. His contract was extended on 29 May 2007, on 26 May 2008, on 12 May 2009, and on 29 June 2010. On 7 December 2010, Orlandoni made his UEFA Champions League debut, at 38 years of age, in a 0–3 loss to SV Werder Bremen.

On 29 June 2011, he extended his contract again. Just before the last round of 2011–12 Serie A, Orlandoni announced his retirement after the season. However, he still travelled with Inter to Indonesia in May 2012 for a friendly tour.

== Career statistics ==
Club	Season	League			Cup		Continental		Other		Total	
Club	Season	Division	Apps	Goals	Apps	Goals	Apps	Goals	Apps	Goals	Apps	Goals
Mantova	1991–92	Serie C2	8	0	0	0	—		—		8	0
Leffe	1992–93	Serie C1	8	0	0	0	—		—		8	0
Casarano	1993–94	Serie C1	22	0	0	0	—		—		22	0
Casarano	1994–95	Serie C1	1	0	0	0	—		—		1	0
Casarano	Total		23	0	0	0	—		—		23	0
Pro Sesto	1994–95	Serie C1	25	0	0	0	—		—		25	0
Ancona	1995–96	Serie B	14	0	0	0	—		—		14	0
Foggia	1996–97	Serie B	1	0	0	0	—		—		1	0
Acireale	1997–98	Serie C1	28	0	0	0	—		—		28	0
Reggina	1998–99	Serie B	34	0	1	0	—		—		35	0
Reggina	1999–2000	Serie A	13	0	4	0	—		—		17	0
Reggina	Total		47	0	5	0	—		—		52	0
Bologna	1999–2000	Serie A	3	0	0	0	—		—		3	0
Lazio	2000–01	Serie A	1	0	0	0	—		0	0	1	0
Piacenza	2001–02	Serie A	13	0	4	0	—		—		17	0
Piacenza	2006–07	Serie A	12	0	3	0	—		—		15	0
Piacenza	2003–04	Serie B	12	0	0	0	—		—		12	0
Piacenza	2004–05	Serie B	27	0	3	0	—		—		30	0
Piacenza	Total		64	0	10	0	—		—		74	0
Internazionale	2005–06	Serie A	1	0	0	0	—		—		1	0
Internazionale	2006–07	Serie A	0	0	0	0	—		0	0	0	0
Internazionale	2007–08	Serie A	2	0	1	0	0	0	0	0	3	0
Internazionale	2008–09	Serie A	1	0	0	0	0	0	0	0	1	0
Internazionale	2009–10	Serie A	0	0	0	0	0	0	0	0	0	0
Internazionale	2010–11	Serie A	0	0	0	0	1 (Note: All appearance(s) in UEFA Champions League)	0	0	0	1	0
Internazionale	2011–12	Serie A	0	0	0	0	0	0	0	0	0	0
Internazionale	Total		4	0	1	0	1	0	0	0	6	0
Career total			226	0	16	0	1	0	1	0	243	0

== Honours ==
Internazionale

- UEFA Cup: 1990-91
- Serie A: 2005–06, 2006–07, 2007–08, 2008–09, 2009–10
- Coppa Italia: 2005–06, 2009–10, 2010–11
- Supercoppa Italiana: 2005, 2006, 2008, 2010
- Champions League: 2009–10
- FIFA Club World Cup: 2010

Lazio

- Supercoppa Italiana: 2000
