= Walter Samuel =

Argentine footballer (born 1978)

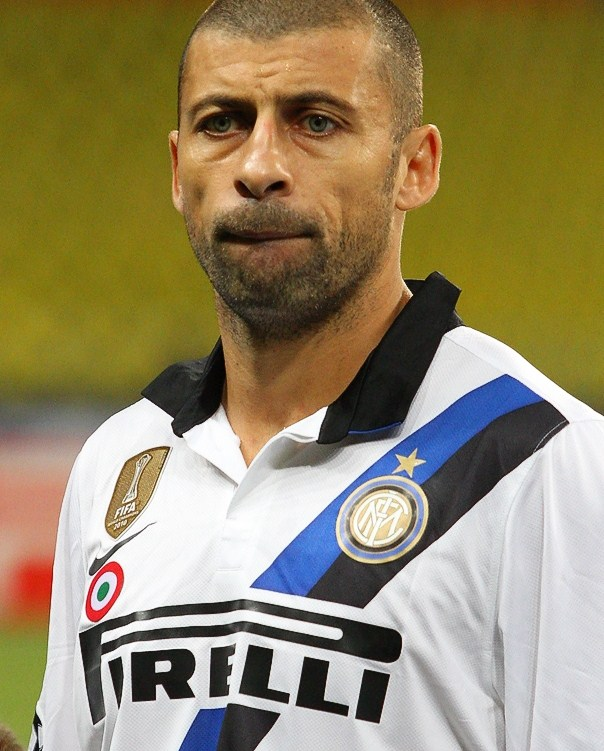
- Samuel with Inter Milan in 2011

Personal information
- Full name: Walter Adrián Samuel
- Birth name: Walter Adrián Luján
- Date of birth: 23 March 1978 (age 48)
- Place of birth: Laborde, Córdoba, Argentina
- Height: 1.83 m (6 ft 0 in)
- Position: Centre-back

Senior career*
Years	Team	Apps	(Gls)
1996–1997	Newell's Old Boys	42	(0)
1997–2000	Boca Juniors	77	(4)
2000–2004	Roma	122	(9)
2004–2005	Real Madrid	30	(2)
2005–2014	Inter Milan	169	(14)
2014–2016	Basel	29	(2)
Total		469	(31)

International career
1997	Argentina U20	6	(0)
1999–2010	Argentina	56	(5)

Managerial career
- 2018–2026: Argentina (assistant)
Medal record
Representing Argentina (as player)
FIFA U-20 World Cup
Winner	1997
FIFA Confederations Cup
Runner-up	2005
Representing Argentina (as assistant manager)
FIFA World Cup
Winner	2022
Copa América
Winner	2021
Winner	2024
Third place	2019
CONMEBOL–UEFA Cup of Champions
Winner	2022
- * Club domestic league appearances and goals

Walter Adrián Samuel (Spanish pronunciation: [ˈwalteɾ saˈmwel]; né Luján; born 23 March 1978) is an Argentine former professional footballer. Samuel has been regarded as one of the best centre-backs of his generation, and as one of football's toughest defenders, with former international teammate and Inter captain Javier Zanetti referring to him as the "hardest player" he has played with.

Samuel began his club career with domestic club Newell's Old Boys in 1996, later moving to Boca Juniors the following year. This was soon followed by a move to Europe in 2000, and spells with Italian club Roma, and Spanish club Real Madrid. In 2005, he returned to Italy, joining Inter, where he remained for nine seasons, winning five consecutive Serie A titles; he played a key role in the club's treble success in the 2009–10 season, partnering with Lúcio in defence under José Mourinho. At an international level, he has accumulated over 50 caps for the Argentina national team, representing his country at two FIFA World Cups, the 1999 Copa América, and the 2005 FIFA Confederations Cup, where he won a runners-up medal.

== Early life and personal life ==
He was born Walter Luján, making his professional debut for Newell's and playing the World Youth Cup under that name. He later took the last name of his stepfather, Óscar Samuel. He has two sisters.

Samuel is married to Cecilia. They have two sons and a daughter.

== Club career ==
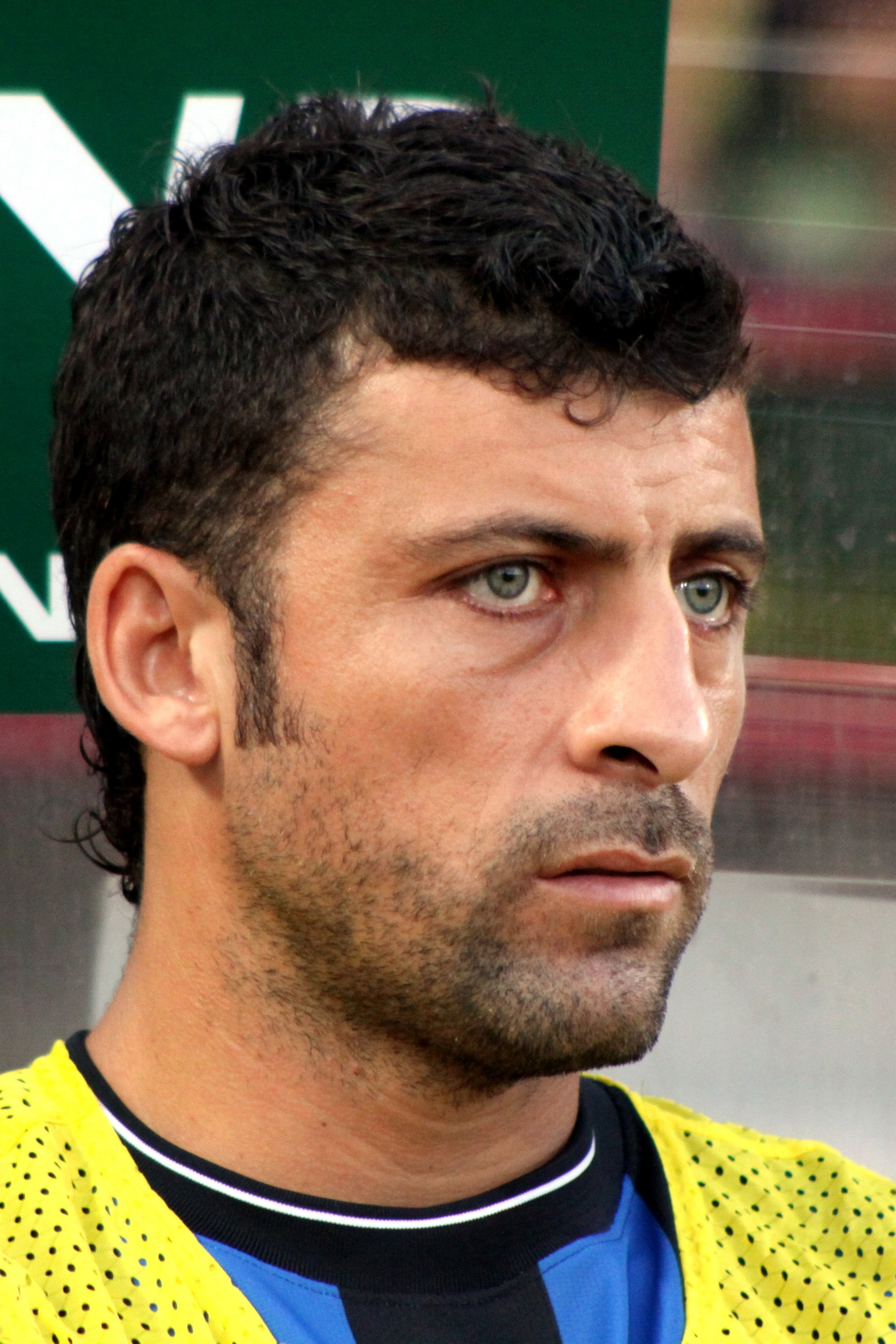
Walter Samuel with Internazionale.

=== Early career ===
Samuel started playing professionally in 1996 in Argentina for Newell's Old Boys, and a year later moved to Boca Juniors, where he played 103 matches and scored five goals in all competitions until 2000. In that year, Roma bought his contract for 40.265 billion Italian lire (about €20 million). He gained fame as one of the best defenders in the Italian league and gained a nickname to match, winning the Serie A title with Roma in 2001. His quality attracted interest from Spanish team Real Madrid.

Real Madrid paid €25 million for his transfer in 2004. Samuel failed to make an impact at Madrid. He was one of the three non-EU players of the team, along with Ronaldo and Roberto Carlos; they all obtained Spanish passports, however, in 2005.

=== Inter Milan ===
In August 2005, he returned to the Serie A with a transfer to Inter Milan on a four-year contract for reported €16 million fee. He began his Inter adventure by winning the 2005 Supercoppa Italiana versus Juventus, entering in 63rd minute as Nerazzurri won at extra-time thanks to the winner of Verón. Later on 21 September, he made his league debut for his new side by starting in the 1–0 away win over Chievo. On 24 November, during a Champions League group stage match against Petržalka, Samuel played in a line-up of 11 foreign players on the pitch, with Luís Figo being the only european. He finished his first season at Inter by making 42 appearances in all competitions, with the team winning the championship following the relegation of Juventus due to match-fixing, and Coppa Italia by defeating Roma 4–2 on aggregate, with Samuel playing on both finals, thus completing an unforeseen domestic treble.

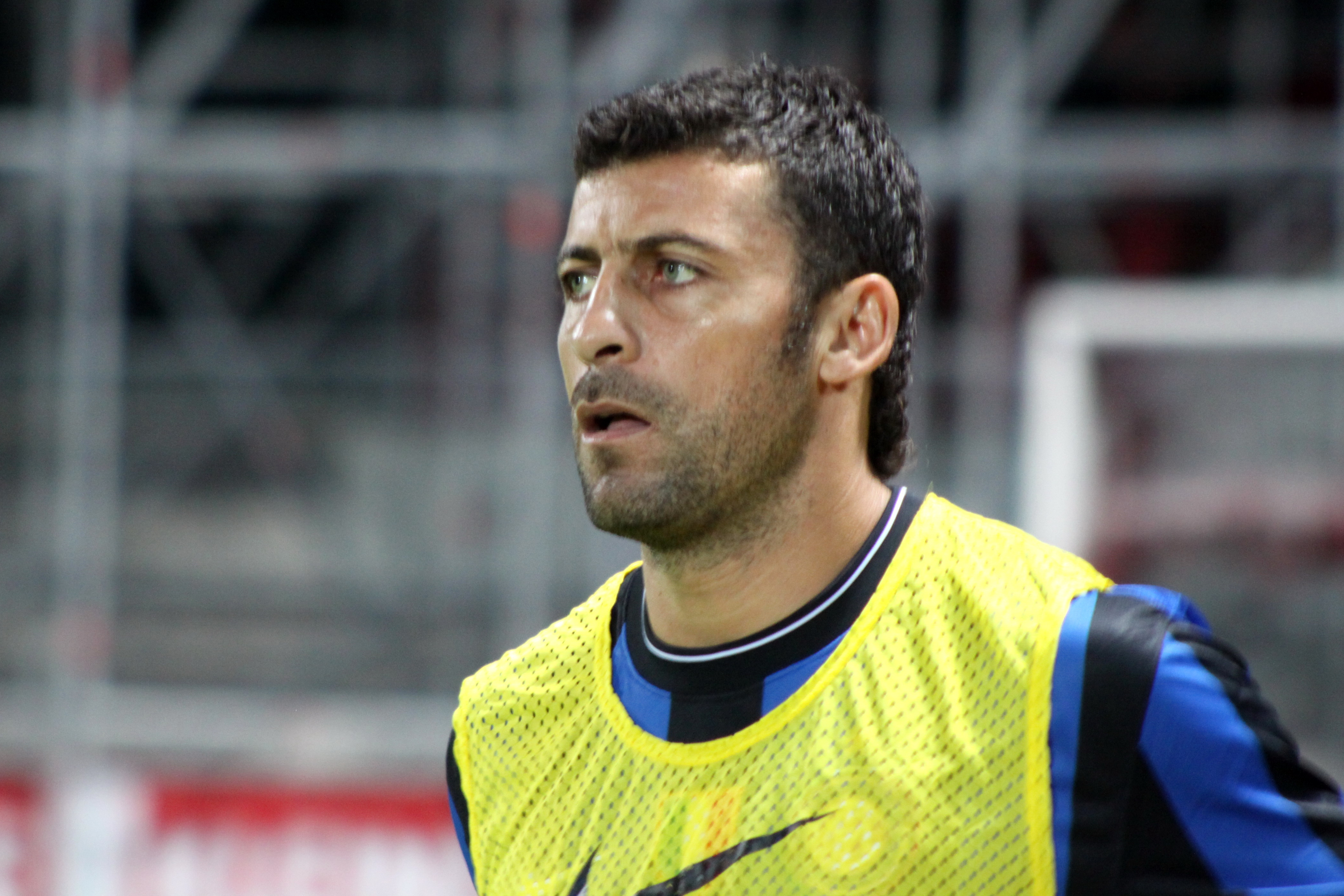
Walter Samuel with Internazionale as a substitute.

In the Derby della Madonnina on 23 December 2007, Samuel hurt himself whilst marking the Brazilian international Kaká, and a couple weeks later, he had reconstructive surgery on his anterior cruciate ligament. He was expected to be out until the end of the 2007–08 season. In actuality, he started training with the first team again in October of the 2008–09 season and promptly earned a first team place back under manager José Mourinho. He played his first match in more than nine months on 9 November by starting in the 1–0 home win over Udinese.

Samuel was one of the most important players under Mourinho in the 2009–10 season, partnering Lúcio in defence as they won the Serie A title, the Coppa Italia, and the UEFA Champions League, completing a historic treble. He scored his first goal of the season on 20 October in the third Champions League group stage match versus Dynamo Kyiv which prevented Inter from losing; he headed home a Wesley Sneijder cross to make it 2–2. This draw extended Inter winless run in the UEFA Champions League to eight matches.

Later on 9 January, Samuel scored a last-minute winner in the 4–3 win versus Siena by beating goalkeeper Gianluca Curci with a left-footed shot. His goal later resulted decisive as Inter won the title two points ahead of Roma. He played his 100th Serie A game for Inter later on 24 April in the 3–1 win over Atalanta. Samuel finished the season by making 42 appearances and scoring 4 goals; he was praised for his defensive performances against Barcelona and Bayern Munich on Inter's road to the Champions League title.

Samuel suffered a severe knee injury - a ruptured anterior cruciate ligament, this time on his other knee - on 7 November 2010 fixture against Brescia. This forced him to miss the 2010 FIFA Club World Cup triumph in United Arab Emirates. He returned in action on 15 May of the following year by entering in the last minutes of a 1–1 away draw versus Napoli. After the match Samuel expressed his delighting for playing his first match in almost six months, stating: "I'm feeling good and I'm delighted at having been able to play the last few minutes of this match. I would like to thank the medical staff for the work they did after my injury, my family who has always stood by me, and all the fans." He finished the 2010–11 season by making 15 appearances in all competitions.

On 5 February 2012, Samuel played his 500th match as a professional in the 4–0 defeat at Roma. At the end of the season, he signed a new one-year contract with the club, lengthening his Inter career up to eight seasons. Later on 7 October, he scored inside three minutes in the derby versus Milan which resulted the winning goal, meaning that Samuel has won all 10 derbies that he has played. In June 2013, Samuel extended his contract for another season, in what would be his final season. He scored his first goal of the season on 9 February 2014, a header which resulted the winner in the match against Sassuolo for the first win of 2014.

Samuel wore the captain armband for the first time on 15 February 2014 in the 2–1 win at Fiorentina due to Javier Zanetti and Esteban Cambiasso being on bench. His final goal for the club came in the 4–0 win at Sampdoria in April 2014. Samuel left the club at the end of 2013–14 season, having made 236 appearances and winning 13 trophies in nine years. His last appearance for the club occurred on 10 May 2014 in the 4–1 home win over Lazio which gave the team a spot in UEFA Europa League next season.

=== Basel ===
After nine seasons with Inter, on 23 July 2014, Samuel signed a one-year contract with Basel in the Swiss Super League. He joined the team for their 2014–15 season under head coach Paulo Sousa. After playing in one test game Samuel played his debut for his new club in the Swiss Cup away game on 23 August 2014 as Basel won 4–0 against CS Italien (GE). He played his domestic league debut for the club in the home game in the St. Jakob-Park on 31 August as Basel won 3–1 against Young Boys.

Basel entered the Champions League in the group stage. They reached the knockout phase on 9 December 2014, as they managed a 1–1 draw at Anfield against Liverpool. But they were knocked out of the competition by Porto in the round of 16. Samuel scored his first goal for his club in the last match of that season on 25 May 2015. It was a home game in the St. Jakob-Park and Basel won 4–3 against St. Gallen. At the end of the 2014–15 season, Basel won the championship for the sixth time in a row. In the 2014–15 Swiss Cup Basel reached the final. However, for the third time in a row they finished as runners-up. Basel played a total of 65 matches (36 Swiss League fixtures, 6 Swiss Cup, 8 Champions League and 15 test matches). Under manager Paulo Sousa, Samuel totaled 26 appearances, 13 League, 1 Cup, 4 Champions League, as well 8 in test games. He scored 2 goals in these matches.

In June 2015, Samuel prolonged his contract with Basel for another year. However, on 16 October he communicated his intention to retire at the end of the 2015–16 season, due to physical difficulties. He made his 100th UEFA club competition appearance playing in the closing match of the 2015–16 UEFA Europa League group stage during the 1–0 away win in the INEA Stadion against Lech Poznań on 10 December 2015. Samuel played the final match of his career in a 1–0 home defeat against Grasshoppers, on 25 May 2016, at the age of 38. At the end of the 2015–16 Super League season, under new head coach Urs Fischer, Samuel won the championship for the second time.

During his two seasons with the club, Samuel played a total of 61 games for Basel scoring a total of four goals. 21 of these games were in the Swiss Super League, five in the Swiss Cup, 11 in the UEFA competitions (Champions League and Europa League) and 16 were friendly games. He scored two goals in the domestic league, one in the 2015–16 UEFA Europa League against Saint-Étienne and the other was scored during the test games.

== International career ==
Samuel was part of Argentina under-20 team which emerged victorious in the 1997 edition of the FIFA U-20 World Cup. He made his debut in the tournament in the opening Group E match versus Hungary which was won 3–0, and went on to play in the remaining two matches as Argentina topped their group.

Samuel played 56 matches for Argentina senior team between 1999 and 2010, scoring five goals. He played for his country in the 2002 and 2010 FIFA World Cup, the 1999 Copa América, as well as in the 2005 FIFA Confederations Cup, in which Argentina were runners-up.

== Style of play ==
Regarded as one of the best defenders of his generation, Samuel was a large, quick, powerful, and aggressive centre-back, who excelled in the air, both defensively, and as a goal threat on set pieces. His defensive skills, which included an excellent positional sense, an ability to read the game, as well as tough, tight marking, and hard tackling, made him extremely effective at anticipating opponents. His strong, consistent, and uncompromising style of play earned him the nickname Il Muro ("The Wall"). Despite his ability as a defender, his career was also marked by several injuries that affected his fitness.

== After football ==
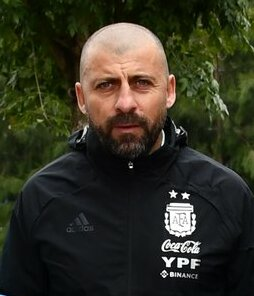
Samuel as assistant manager of Argentina, 2022

In August 2019, Samuel enrolled in the UEFA Pro Licence courses at Coverciano. He was the assistant coach for Argentina and held the position from 2019 to 2026.

He was part of the Argentina managerial team who won the 2022 FIFA World Cup Qatar. He was also part of the managerial team at 2026 World Cup.

== Career statistics ==
=== Club ===
As of 25 May 2016

Appearances and goals by club, season and competition
Club	Season	League			National cup		Continental		Other		Total	
Club	Season	Division	Apps	Goals	Apps	Goals	Apps	Goals	Apps	Goals	Apps	Goals
Newell's Old Boys	1995–96	Argentine Primera División	5	0	—		—		—		5	0
Newell's Old Boys	1996–97	Argentine Primera División	35	0	—		—		—		35	0
Newell's Old Boys	1997–98	Argentine Primera División	2	0	—		—		—		2	0
Newell's Old Boys	Total		42	0	—		—		—		42	0
Boca Juniors	1997–98	Argentine Primera División	12	0	—		—		—		12	0
Boca Juniors	1998–99	Argentine Primera División	34	2	—		7	0	—		41	2
Boca Juniors	1999–2000	Argentine Primera División	31	2	—		19	1	—		50	3
Boca Juniors	Total		77	4	—		26	1	—		103	5
Roma	2000–01	Serie A	31	1	2	0	8	3	—		41	4
Roma	2001–02	Serie A	30	5	2	0	12	0	1 (Note: Appearance in Supercoppa Italiana)	0	45	5
Roma	2002–03	Serie A	31	2	6	0	10	0	—		47	2
Roma	2003–04	Serie A	30	1	2	0	8	0	—		40	1
Roma	Total		122	9	12	0	38	3	1	0	173	12
Real Madrid	2004–05	La Liga	30	2	2	0	8	0	—		40	2
Internazionale	2005–06	Serie A	27	2	5	0	9	0	1	0	42	2
Internazionale	2006–07	Serie A	18	3	5	0	3	0	1	0	27	3
Internazionale	2007–08	Serie A	12	0	1	0	5	1	0	0	18	1
Internazionale	2008–09	Serie A	17	1	2	0	1	0	0	0	20	1
Internazionale	2009–10	Serie A	28	3	1	0	13	1	0	0	42	4
Internazionale	2010–11	Serie A	10	0	0	0	3	0	2 (Note: One appearance in Supercoppa Italiana, one appearances in UEFA Super Cup)	0	13	0
Internazionale	2011–12	Serie A	27	2	1	0	6	1	1	0	35	3
Internazionale	2012–13	Serie A	16	1	1	0	5	0	—		22	1
Internazionale	2013–14	Serie A	14	2	1	0	—		—		15	2
Internazionale	Total		169	14	17	0	45	3	5	0	236	17
Basel	2014–15	Swiss Super League	12	1	2	0	4	0	—		18	1
Basel	2015–16	Swiss Super League	17	1	3	0	7	1	—		27	2
Basel	Total		29	2	5	0	11	1	—		47	3
Career total			469	31	36	0	128	8	—		641	39

=== International ===
Appearances and goals by national team and year
National team	Year	Apps	Goals
Argentina	1999	10	1
Argentina	2000	10	0
Argentina	2001	8	2
Argentina	2002	6	0
Argentina	2003	5	1
Argentina	2004	6	0
Argentina	2005	5	1
Argentina	2006	2	0
Argentina	2007	0	0
Argentina	2008	0	0
Argentina	2009	0	0
Argentina	2010	4	0
Total		56	5

Scores and results list Argentina's goal tally first, score column indicates score after each Samuel goal.

List of international goals scored by Walter Samuel
No.	Date	Venue	Opponent	Score	Result	Competition
1	3 February 1999	Estadio José Pachencho Romero, Maracaibo, Venezuela	Venezuela	1–0	2–0	Friendly
2	28 March 2001	El Monumental, Buenos Aires, Argentina	Venezuela	5–0	5–0	2002 FIFA World Cup qualification
3	8 November 2001	El Monumental, Buenos Aires, Argentina	Peru	1–0	2–0	2002 FIFA World Cup qualification
4	20 August 2003	Stadio Artemio Franchi, Florence, Italy	Uruguay	2–2	3–2	Friendly
5	11 November 2005	Stade de Genève, Geneva, Switzerland	England	2–1	2–3	Friendly

== Honours ==
Boca Juniors

- Primera División: 1998 Apertura, 1999 Clausura
- Copa Libertadores: 2000

AS Roma

- Serie A: 2000–01
- Supercoppa Italiana: 2001

Inter Milan

- Serie A: 2005–06, 2006–07, 2007–08, 2008–09, 2009–10
- Coppa Italia: 2005–06, 2009–10, 2010–11
- Supercoppa Italiana: 2005, 2006, 2008, 2010
- UEFA Champions League: 2009–10
- FIFA Club World Cup: 2010

FC Basel

- Swiss Super League: 2014–15, 2015–16

Argentina U20

- FIFA U-20 World Cup: 1997
- South American U-20 Championship: 1997

Argentina U21

- Toulon Tournament: 1998

Argentina

- FIFA Confederations Cup runner-up: 2005

Individual

- South American Team of the Year: 1999
- ESM Team of the Year: 2001–02, 2003–04
- Serie A Defender of the Year: 2010
- FIFA FIFPro World XI Nominee 2005, 2009, 2010
- IFFHS Argentina All Times Dream Team (Team C): 2021

=== Managerial ===
Argentina (as assistant manager)

- FIFA World Cup: 2022
- Copa América: 2021, 2024; third place: 2019
- CONMEBOL–UEFA Cup of Champions: 2022
