= Nelson Rivas =

Colombian football defender (born 1983)

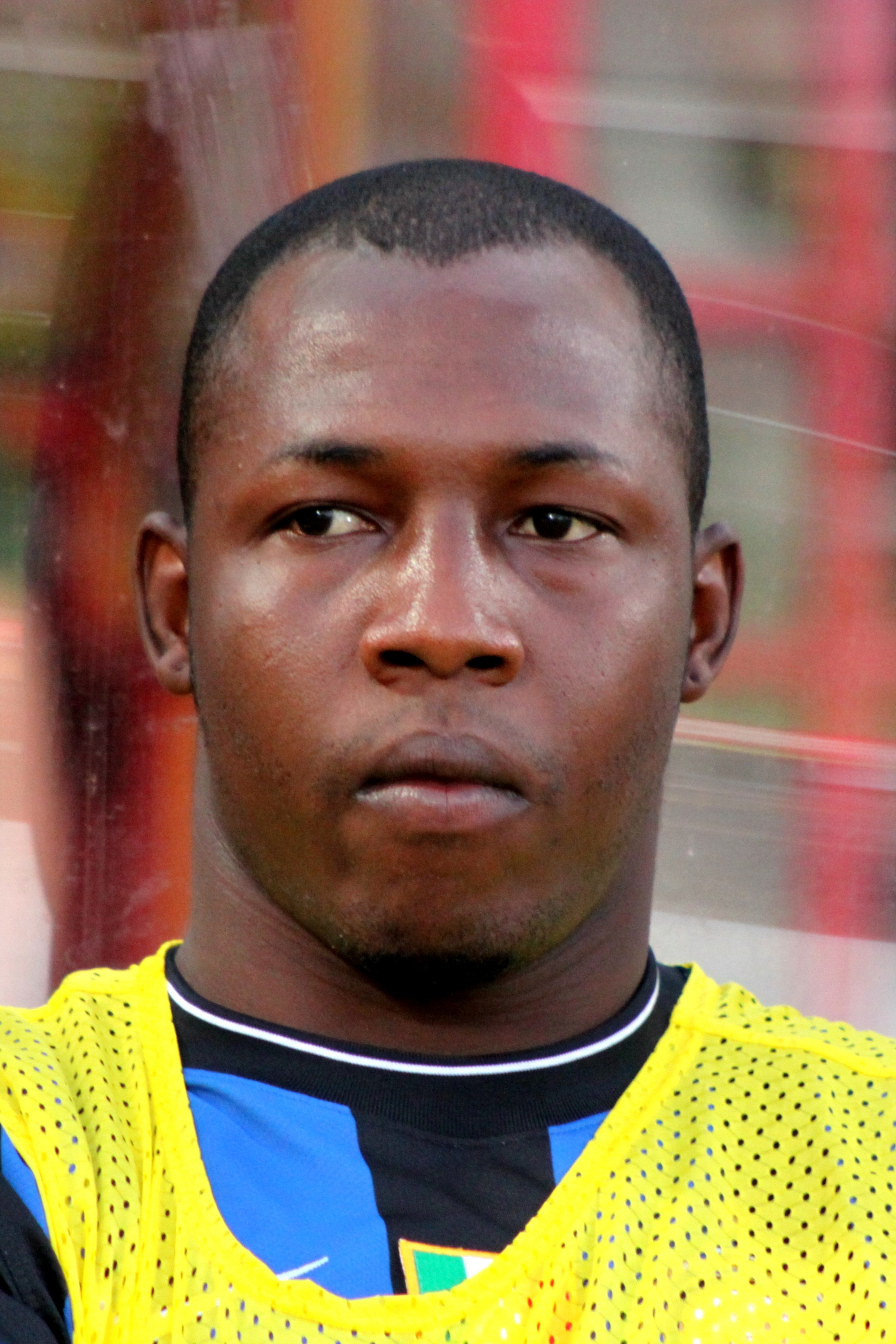
- Rivas with Internazionale in 2009

Personal information
- Full name: Nelson Enrique Rivas López
- Date of birth: 25 March 1983 (age 43)
- Place of birth: Pradera, Colombia
- Height: 1.81 m (5 ft 11 in)
- Position: Defender

Senior career*
Years	Team	Apps	(Gls)
2002	Deportivo Pasto	12	(0)
2003	Deportivo Cali	3	(0)
2003	Deportes Tolima	18	(0)
2004–2006	Deportivo Cali	93	(2)
2007	River Plate	9	(0)
2007–2011	Internazionale	27	(0)
2009–2010	→ Livorno (loan)	16	(2)
2011	→ Dnipro Dnipropetrovsk (loan)	1	(0)
2012–2014	Montreal Impact	11	(0)
2015	Atlético	12	(1)
- * Club domestic league appearances and goals as of 9 September 2016

Nelson Enrique Rivas López (born 25 March 1983) is a Colombian former professional footballer who played as a defender.

== Career ==
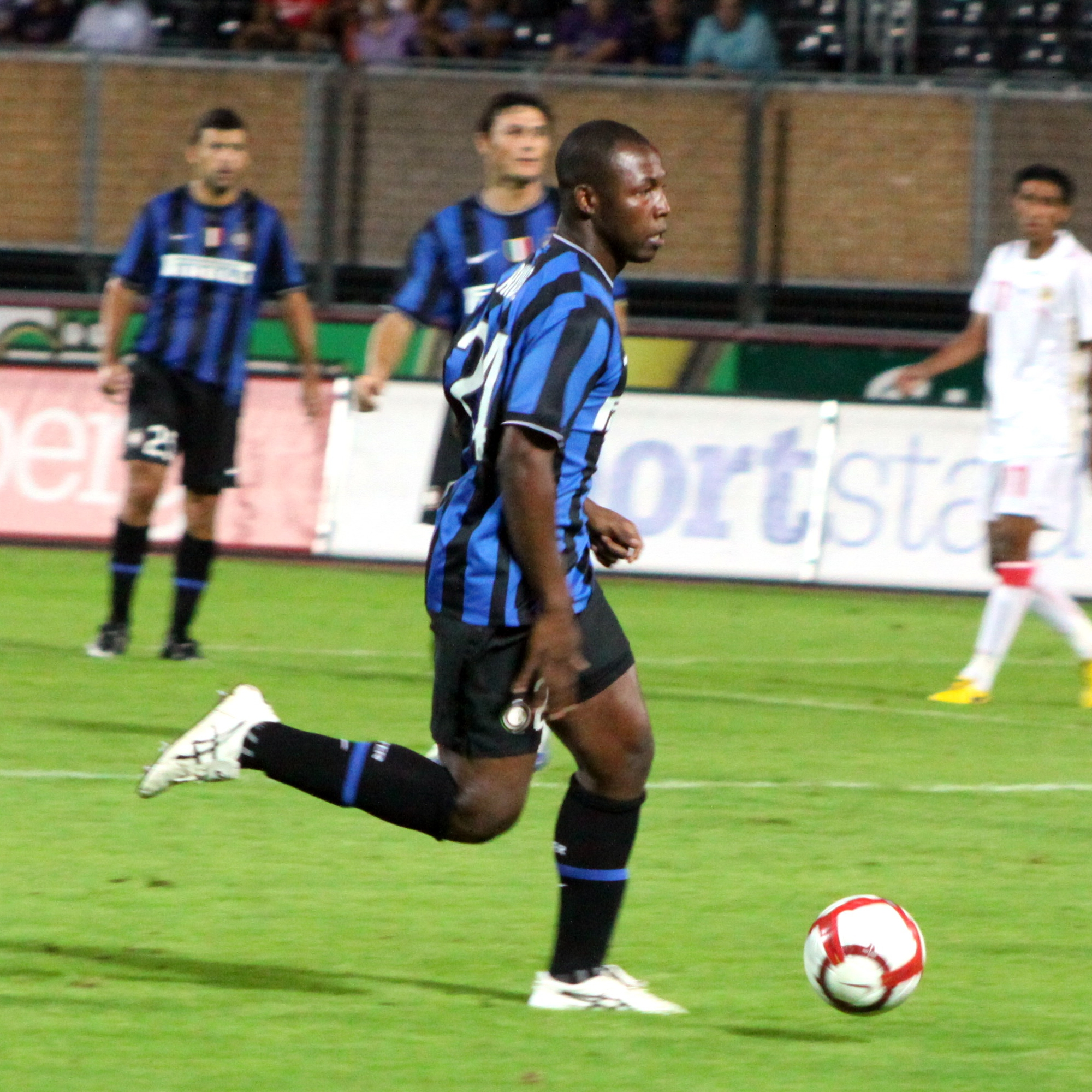
Rivas playing for Inter

Rivas began his career with Deportivo Pasto. After playing for several clubs in his native Colombia, Rivas became a fixture for Deportivo Cali. He was a two-time winner of the Copa Mustang in Colombia, first with Deportes Tolima in 2003 and for the second time with Deportivo Cali in 2005. After leaving Cali he played for legendary club River Plate in Argentina.

Rivas was bought in July 2007 by Internazionale for €5 million and signed a contract until 30 June 2011. The transfer fee actually paid via FC Locarno in order to redistributed to investor. He made his debut in a Champions League game Fenerbahçe-Inter (1–0). On 23 September 2007 it was reported in Italy that Rivas had collapsed at the Saturday training session the previous day. He went to further examinations throughout the week after the incident. On 4 October 2008 he injured his knee in the Serie A game against Bologna. While with Inter he became a Serie A champion, having won it in the 2007–2008 season and 2008–2009.

He was loaned to A.S. Livorno Calcio during the 2009–2010 season where he played a total of 16 games, scoring two goals. On 31 August 2011 the Colombian stopper became a free agent after his contract at Inter was rescinded by mutual consent.

On 2 October 2011 Nelson Rivas signed with Montreal Impact of Major League Soccer.

On 4 August 2012, at the 67th minute during a match between Montreal vs Philadelphia, Rivas was thrown to the ground by Antoine Hoppenot, prompting Rivas to headbutt Hoppenot. A dispute between the two teams followed, with both Rivas and Philadelphia's Jack McInerney being sent off with red cards. Upon league review, Rivas received a three-game suspension.

== Honours ==
Deportes Tolima

- Copa Mustang: 2003

Deportivo Cali

- Copa Mustang: 2005

Inter

- Serie A: 2008, 2009
- Supercoppa Italiana: 2008, 2010

Montreal Impact

- Canadian Championship: 2013, 2014
