= Victor Obinna =

Nigerian footballer (born 1987)

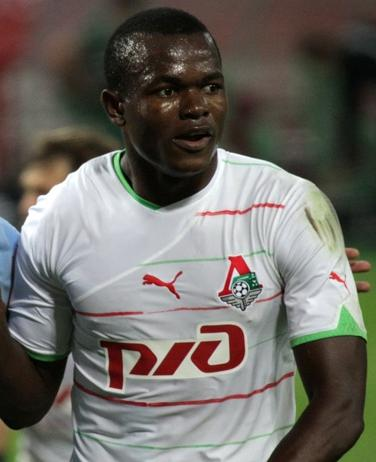
- Obinna playing for Lokomotiv Moscow in 2011

Personal information
- Full name: Victor Nsofor Obinna
- Date of birth: 25 March 1987 (age 39)
- Place of birth: Jos, Nigeria
- Height: 1.80 m (5 ft 11 in)
- Position: Striker

Youth career
- 2003: Plateau United
- 2004: Kwara United
- 2005: Enyimba
- 2005: Internacional

Senior career*
Years	Team	Apps	(Gls)
2005–2008	Chievo	82	(19)
2008–2011	Inter Milan	9	(1)
2009–2010	→ Málaga (loan)	26	(4)
2010–2011	→ West Ham United (loan)	25	(3)
2011–2015	Lokomotiv Moscow	45	(3)
2014	→ Chievo (loan)	10	(2)
2015–2016	MSV Duisburg	15	(3)
2016–2017	Darmstadt 98	2	(0)
2017–2018	Cape Town City	12	(1)
Total		226	(36)

International career
2005–2014	Nigeria	48	(12)
Medal record
Olympic Games
Silver medal – second place	2008 Beijing	Team
Africa Cup of Nations
Third place	2006 Egypt	2010 Angola
- * Club domestic league appearances and goals

Victor Nsofor Obinna (born 25 March 1987) is a Nigerian former professional footballer who played as a striker.

Obinna in Igbo, literally means "father's heart". He played for Chievo in Italy's Serie B, having played regularly in Serie A with the club until their relegation in 2007. He made his full international debut for Nigeria at the 2006 African Cup of Nations, scoring once in three appearances as his side were eliminated in the semi-finals.

== Club career ==
=== Early career ===
Obinna played for Nigerian clubs Plateau United and Kwara United, he went on trials with Italian clubs Inter Milan, Perugia and Juventus before signing with Brazilian club Internacional, but international clearance problems meant that the transfer was never finalised. He rejoined Enyimba to take part in their domestic league campaign and CAF Champions League defence.

=== Chievo ===
Obinna was signed by Italian club Chievo on a five-year contract in July 2005. But also reported that Chievo formed an agreement with Inter Milan that Obinna first registered as Chievo player in order to use the non-EU registration quota of Chievo, like Júlio César in the 2004–05 season. Then he would be call back to Inter.

In his first season with Chievo, Obinna scored six goals in 26 games, including a goal on his Serie A debut against Parma in a 1–0 win, 11 September 2005. In the first months of the 2006 season, Obinna was suspended for having signed a contract with both Internacional and Chievo in 2005. Chievo were relegated at the end of the 2006–07 season, casting some doubt over Obinna's future; the club chose to keep Obinna in the squad to help gain promotion back to Serie A.

On 4 October 2007, Obinna was involved in a car accident on his way home from training in which he swerved away from a vehicle that had tried to overtake him around a bend. He escaped with only a few cuts and bruises. The car flipped several times and was heavily damaged. He lost consciousness and was taken to hospital. The accident occurred only a few hundred yards away from where former Chievo player Jason Mayélé was killed in a car accident in 2002.

=== Inter Milan ===
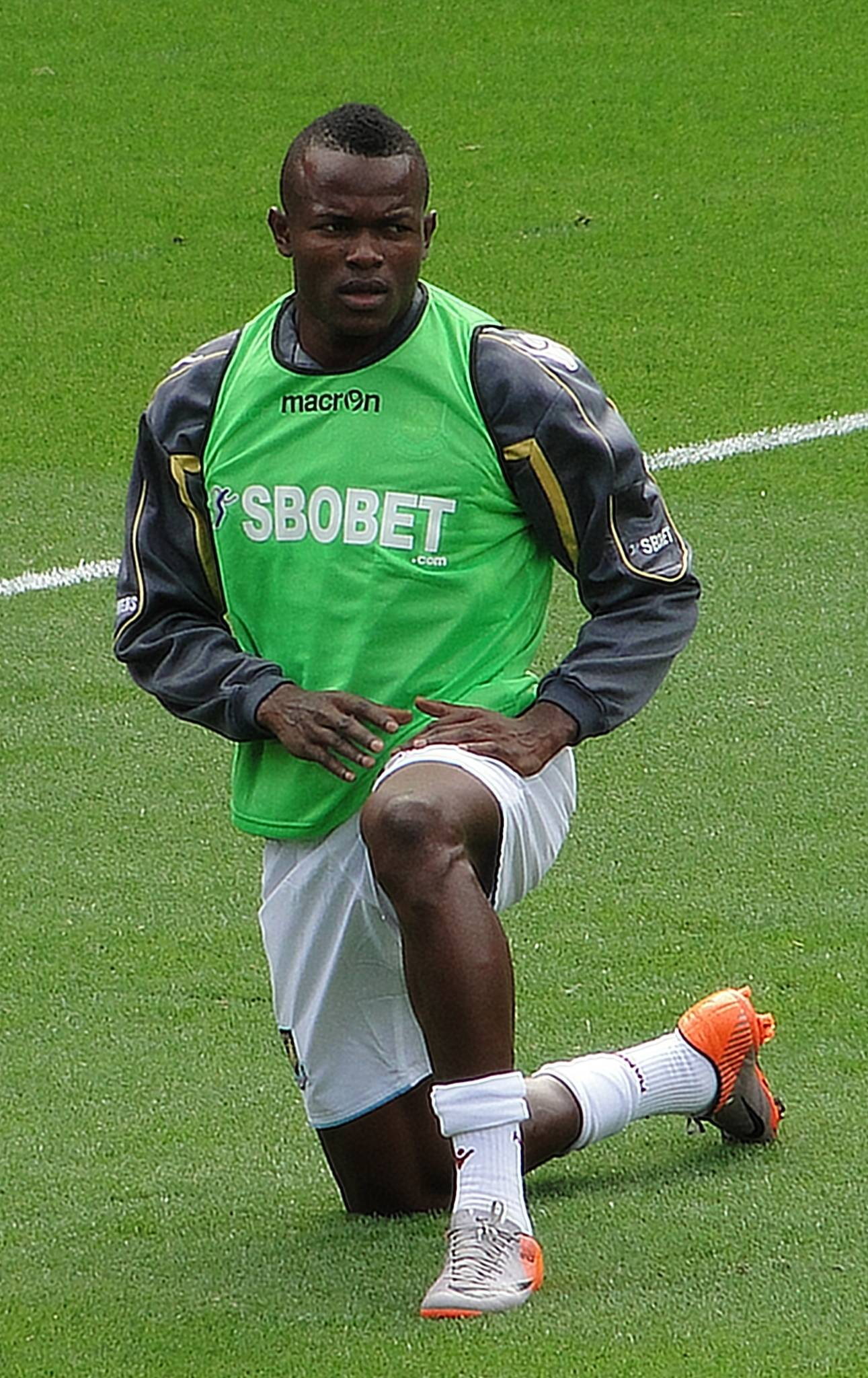
Obinna with West Ham United

In the summer of 2008, Obinna moved back to Inter Milan for a €1.2 million transfer fee in a three-year contract. English club Everton attempted to immediately sign him on loan, but were unable to secure a work permit for the player. Obinna's first goal for Inter came on 19 October in a 4–0 win over Roma. Inter Milan coach José Mourinho described Obinna as one of Inter's best talents for the future.

==== Málaga ====
On 26 August 2009, Spanish La Liga side Málaga signed Obinna on a season-long loan. He scored his first goal for the Andalusian club on 4 October in 1–1 a draw against Xerez, a match in which he was also sent off.

==== West Ham United ====
On 27 August 2010, Obinna signed for West Ham United on a season-long loan with the option of a permanent deal in 2011. He made his debut for West Ham on 11 September in a 3–1 home defeat to Chelsea. He scored his first goal for West Ham in a 2–1 win against Sunderland in the third round of the League Cup at the Stadium of Light on 21 September 2010. He scored his first league goal in 3–1 win against Wigan Athletic on 27 November 2010. He continued the fine form with four assists in a 4–0 win against Manchester United on 30 November 2010, automatically booking a first League Cup semi-final for 20 years.

Obinna was sent off during West Ham's semi-final, first leg match on 11 January 2011 against Birmingham City for an off the ball challenge on Sebastian Larsson with West Ham having conceded an equaliser just minutes earlier. On 30 January, Obinna scored a hat-trick in a FA Cup 4th round tie against Nottingham Forest, leading West Ham to a 3–2 victory. He followed that up three days later with two goals as West Ham beat Blackpool 3–1 at Bloomfield Road.

=== Later career ===
On 19 June 2011, Obinna signed a four-year deal with Lokomotiv Moscow on a free transfer.

Obinna joined MSV Duisburg on 9 September 2015 for the 2015–16 season. He joined Darmstadt 98 on 5 August 2016. He was released on 31 January 2017.

In September 2017, Obinna signed for Premier Soccer League side Cape Town City. At the time of signing, the club were managed by former West Ham teammate Benni McCarthy.

== International career ==
Obinna was a member of the U-20 Flying Eagles that won the gold in Benin in the African Youth Tournament in 2005 he was called up to the Nigerian senior squad at the 2006 African Cup of Nations, scoring once before his side's semifinal elimination.

In August 2008, he was named amongst Nigeria's squad for the 2008 Summer Olympics in Beijing. Obinna scored Nigeria's first goal in a 2–1 win against Japan the "Dream Team IV" winning goal in the final group match against the United States, ensuring that Nigeria qualified for the quarter-finals. Nigeria were drawn against Ivory Coast who they beat 2–0, with Obinna scoring a penalty and setting up Peter Odemwingie for the other goal. He later captained the Nigerian team when they beat Belgium 4–1 in the semi-final match, before losing to Argentina in the final.

In January 2010, Obinna represented Nigeria at the 2010 Africa Cup of Nations. He appeared in the group-stage matches against Egypt, Benin, and Mozambique, and came on as a substitute in the quarter-final against Zambia and the semi-final against Ghana. Nigeria lost 0–1 to Ghana in the semi-final but defeated Algeria 1–0 in the third-place play-off to finish third. Obinna started the match and scored the winning goal in the 55th minute.

Later that year, he represented Nigeria at the 2010 FIFA World Cup. He started Nigeria's opening group-stage match against Argentina and played 51 minutes in a 0–1 defeat. He did not feature against Greece, while he came on as a substitute in the second half of the final group-stage match against South Korea, playing 21 minutes. Nigeria drew 2–2 with South Korea and were eliminated in the group stage. Obinna made two appearances in the tournament.

== Personal life ==
In July 2023, Obinna married his Serbian girlfriend Anastasija Radi. The couple has two children.

== Career statistics ==
=== Club ===
Appearances and goals by club, season and competition
Club	Season	League			Cup		Continental		Other		Total	
Club	Season	Division	Apps	Goals	Apps	Goals	Apps	Goals	Apps	Goals	Apps	Goals
Chievo	2005–06	Serie A	26	6	1	0	—		—		27	6
Chievo	2006–07	Serie A	24	5	3	1	—		—		27	6
Chievo	2007–08	Serie B	32	8	—		—		—		32	8
Chievo	Total		82	19	4	1	—		—		86	20
Inter Milan	2008–09	Serie A	9	1	2	0	0	0	0	0	11	1
Málaga (loan)	2009–10	La Liga	26	4	1	0	—		—		27	4
West Ham United (loan)	2010–11	Premier League	25	3	3	3	—		4 (Note: Appearance(s) in Football League Cup)	2	32	8
Lokomotiv Moscow	2011–12	Russian Premier League	16	1	2	0	8 (Note: Appearance(s) in UEFA Europa League)	2	—		26	3
Lokomotiv Moscow	2012–13	Russian Premier League	26	2	2	0	0	0	—		28	2
Lokomotiv Moscow	2013–14	Russian Premier League	3	0	1	0	—		—		4	0
Lokomotiv Moscow	Total		45	3	5	0	8	2	—		58	5
Chievo (loan)	2013–14	Serie A	10	2	0	0	—		—		10	2
MSV Duisburg	2015–16	2. Bundesliga	15	3	0	0	—		—		15	3
Darmstadt 98	2016–17	Bundesliga	2	0	0	0	—		—		2	0
Cape Town City	2017–18	Premier Soccer League	12	1	2	0	—		—		14	1
Career total			226	36	17	4	8	2	4	2	255	44

=== International ===
Appearances and goals by national team and year
National team	Year	Apps	Goals
Nigeria	2006	5	1
Nigeria	2007	1	0
Nigeria	2008	8	1
Nigeria	2009	9	3
Nigeria	2010	13	3
Nigeria	2011	8	3
Nigeria	2013	3	1
Nigeria	2014	1	0
Total		49	12

== Honours ==
Chievo

- Serie B: 2007–08

Inter Milan

- Serie A: 2008–09
- Supercoppa Italiana: 2008

Nigeria U23

- Summer Olympics runner-up: 2008

Nigeria

- Africa Cup of Nations third place: 2010
