= Maxwell (footballer, born 1981) =

Brazilian association football player

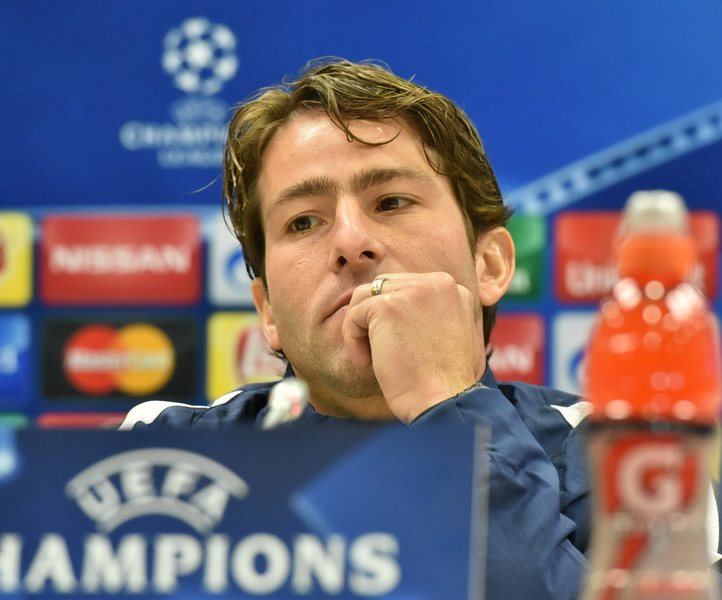
- Maxwell with Paris Saint-Germain in 2015

Personal information
- Full name: Maxwell Scherrer Cabelino Andrade
- Date of birth: 27 August 1981 (age 45)
- Place of birth: Cachoeiro de Itapemirim, Brazil
- Height: 1.76 m (5 ft 9 in)
- Position: Left-back

Youth career
- 1994–2001: Cruzeiro

Senior career*
Years	Team	Apps	(Gls)
2000–2001	Cruzeiro	27	(2)
2001–2006	Ajax	114	(9)
2006–2009	Inter Milan	79	(2)
2009–2012	Barcelona	57	(1)
2012–2017	Paris Saint-Germain	145	(12)
Total		422	(25)

International career
2004	Brazil U23	6	(1)
2013–2014	Brazil	10	(0)
- * Club domestic league appearances and goals

Maxwell Scherrer Cabelino Andrade (born 27 August 1981), known as Maxwell, is a Brazilian football executive and former player who is currently assistant sporting director of Ligue 1 club Paris Saint-Germain.

A left-back, Maxwell came through the ranks at Cruzeiro and played for Ajax, Inter Milan, Barcelona and Paris Saint-Germain, winning trophies for each of these clubs. He was the most decorated active footballer in Europe at the time of his retirement, with 31 official titles. He made his international debut with Brazil in 2013 and appeared at the 2014 FIFA World Cup.

== Club career ==
=== Early career ===
Born in Cachoeiro de Itapemirim, Espírito Santo, Maxwell started his career at Cruzeiro. In June 2001, he signed a five-year contract with AFC Ajax. Maxwell played his best season for Ajax in the 2003–04 season, only missing three games for the Eredivisie champions that season due to international duty, and becoming the Dutch Footballer of the Year. He was seriously injured in April 2005 and never played again for Ajax.

=== Inter Milan ===
Maxwell's contract with Ajax was restructured to expire early, on 2 January 2006, in order to facilitate his move to Internazionale on a free transfer. Due to non-EU player registration quota per year, however, he was signed by Empoli until the end of season before being officially transferred to Inter, a deal similar to that of Júlio César's move to Chievo. Maxwell, however, did not make any appearances for Empoli.

In July 2006, Inter officially announced the signing of Maxwell on a four-year contract as a domestic transfer. Maxwell impressed during his first season in Serie A, most notably against Parma at San Siro when he scored a fine solo effort after a defender struck him, which was voted Inter's thunder goal of the season by Inter channel viewers.

Initially playing at left-back, the 2007–08 season saw him move further up the field, with Cristian Chivu replacing him at left-back while Maxwell played a left midfield role. This became very effective as Maxwell adapted well to the winger role which made use of his blistering pace. In that season, he won his second consecutive Scudetto with Inter. In the 2008–09 season, he suffered a serious injury that took him out of competition for six weeks. He returned to action and was a constant fixture in the starting XI and showed his impressive old form before the injury. He scored his second goal for Inter on 14 December against Chievo, which Inter won 4–2, after an assist from Dejan Stanković.

=== Barcelona ===
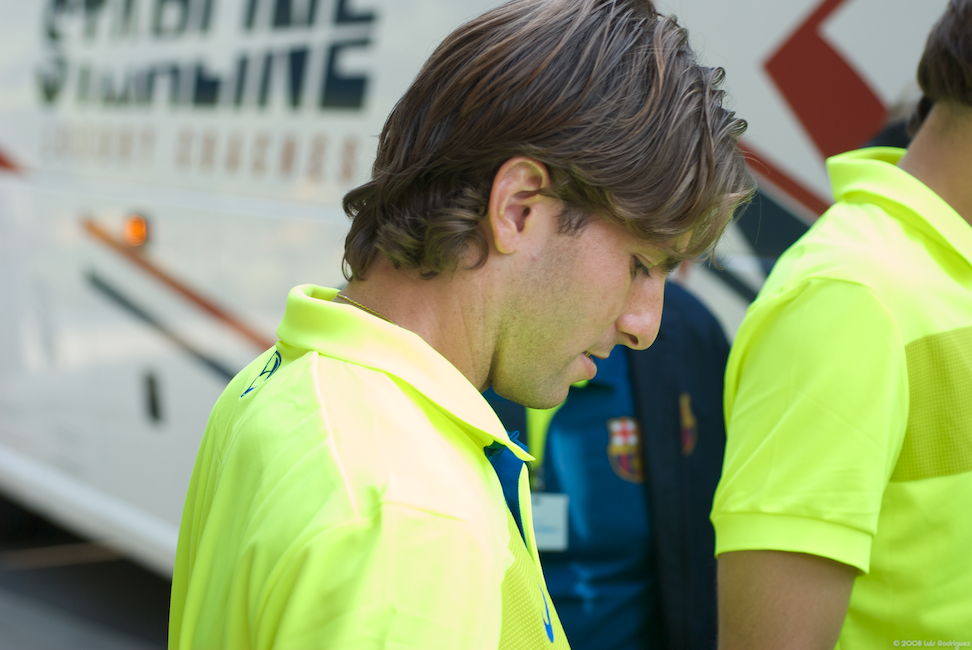
Maxwell with Barcelona in 2009

On 15 July 2009, it was announced that Barcelona and Inter had reached an agreement, with Maxwell joining the Catalan club for €4.5 million plus €500,000. Two days later, Maxwell signed a five-year contract and was presented as a new Barça player. He made his debut for the club in the second leg of the 2009 Supercopa de España, playing all 90 minutes. He had an important role in the second part of the season when Eric Abidal was injured and helped Barcelona win La Liga.

Maxwell started Barcelona's first competitive match of the 2010–11 season, the first leg of the 2010 Supercopa de España, in an advanced left-wing position; he assisted the opening goal for Zlatan Ibrahimović.

=== Paris Saint-Germain ===
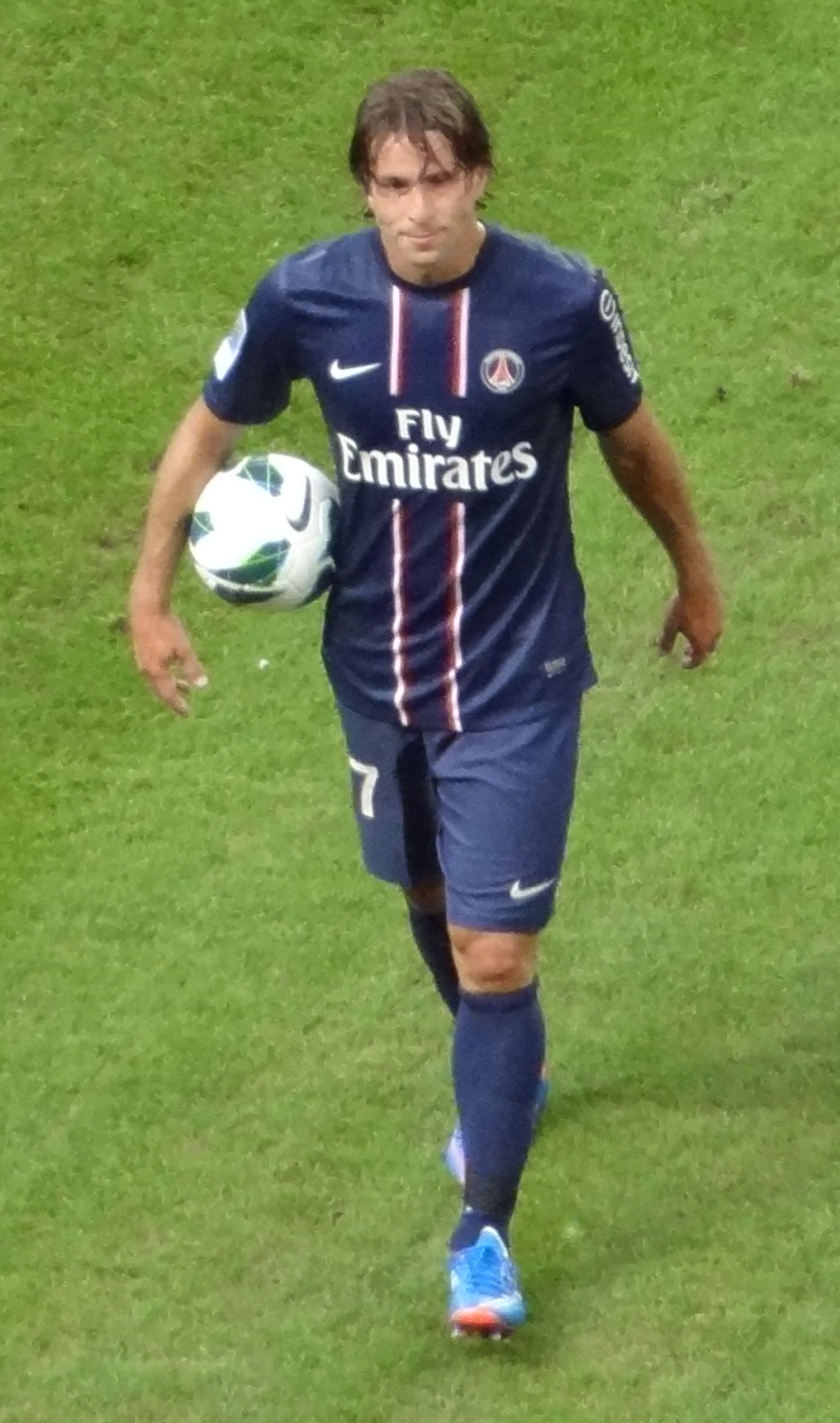
Maxwell with PSG in 2012

On 12 January 2012, Maxwell penned a three-year deal at Paris Saint-Germain after passing his medical examination. PSG paid €3.5 million for the player. For the 2013–14 season, he was the starting left-back, replacing Siaka Tiéné, who left the club for Montpellier. On 28 February 2014, Maxwell extended his contract until June 2015.

On 4 February 2015, Maxwell scored the only goal as PSG defeated Lille away to reach the Coupe de la Ligue Final.

Maxwell was given a farewell send-off by Paris Saint-Germain after his final league match against Caen in May 2017. His teammates formed a guard of honor and wore shirts bearing a message of thanks to him at the Parc des Princes, where he had played for six seasons. The Spanish coach Unai Emery started him in that match, giving the 35-year-old Brazilian full-back the chance to bid farewell to the fans, and Maxwell also had the opportunity to wear the captain's armband during the game.

== International career ==
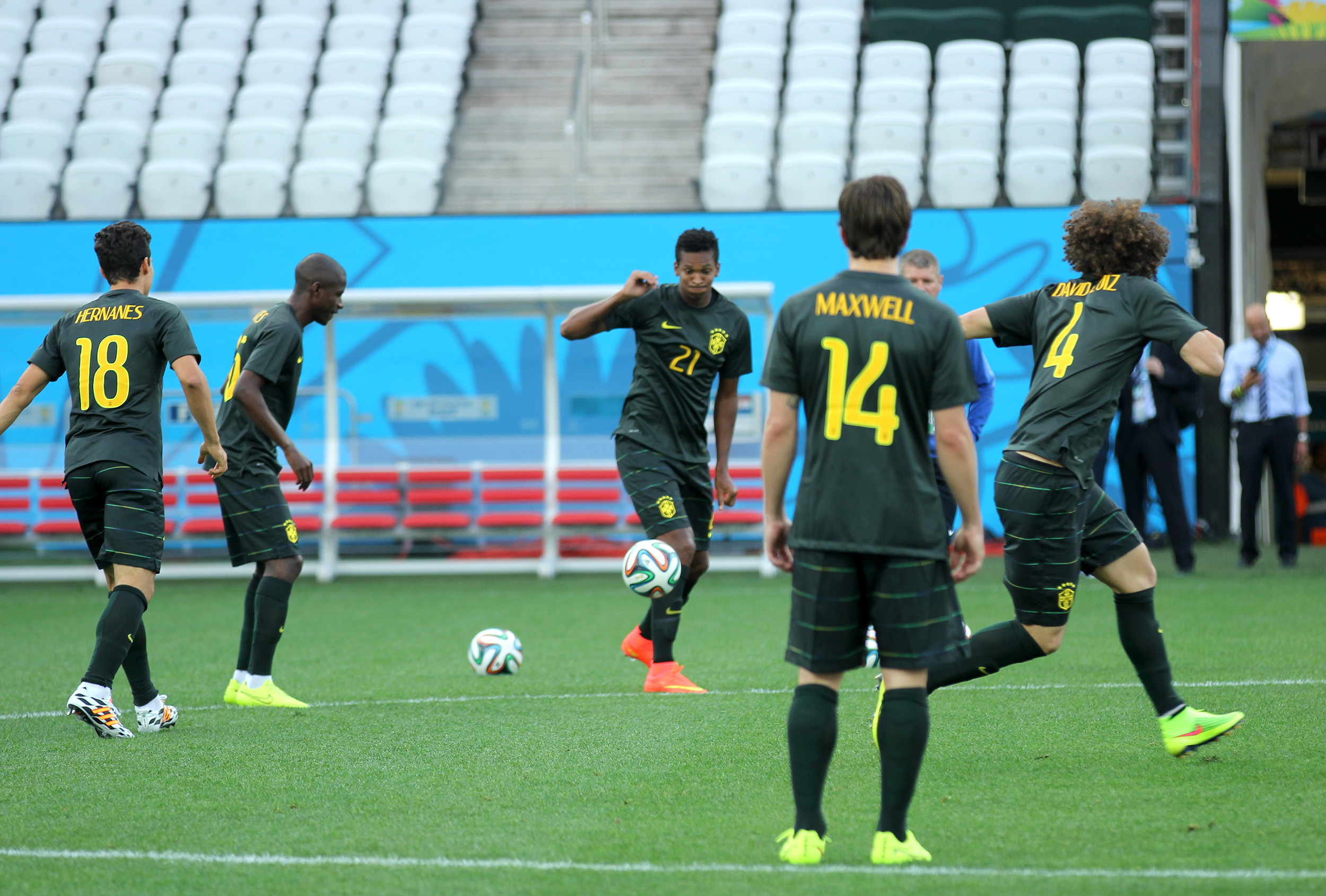
Maxwell (front) training with Hernanes (left), Ramires, Jô and David Luiz before Brazil's game against Croatia, the opening match of the 2014 FIFA World Cup, on 11th June.

Maxwell was capped for the 2004 CONMEBOL Pre-Olympic Tournament with the Brazil under-23 squad in January 2004.

In October 2004, he received his first call-up to the senior team for the 2006 World Cup qualifying matches, but did not make any appearances.

Maxwell earned his first full senior international cap on 14 August 2013, coming on as a substitute in a 1–0 friendly defeat to Switzerland in Basel.

On 7 May 2014, Maxwell was included in Luiz Felipe Scolari's 23-man Brazil squad for the 2014 World Cup, which was held on home soil. He made his only appearance in the tournament in the third-place play-off, held in Brasília, starting at left-back as Brazil were defeated 3–0 by the Netherlands; he played the full 90 minutes in his final international match.

Following the tournament, Maxwell was no longer called up by manager Dunga, and announced his retirement from international football in October 2014. "I was honestly surprised when I got the call-up, as I really didn't expect it at all," Maxwell said of his later-than-usual inclusion in the Brazil team. "I just tried to enjoy every minute I had in the national team. On the field, but also off the field, talking to the guys and sharing that happiness that all the Brazilian players have when they meet each other."

== Post-playing career ==
After his retirement from playing, Maxwell was appointed assistant sporting director at Paris Saint-Germain, working with sporting director Antero Henrique.

== Style of play ==
A technical, diminutive attacking left-back, Maxwell was known for his consistency and longevity at the top level. While being a good ball-winner, and solid defensively, he was also classy and elegant on the ball, confident in possession, and reliable in his distribution, rarely relinquishing the ball; his wide range of skills thus enabled him to bring balance to his teams in the full-back or wing-back position. A versatile player, he was also effective going forward due to his skill and pace; indeed, during the course of a match, he often pushed further up the pitch with his offensive runs down the left flank, in order to get into good positions from which he could deliver crosses to teammates in the area, or help to stretch the play, and was also capable of playing in a more advanced role as a left-winger, either in midfield, or in a three-man attack.

== Personal life ==
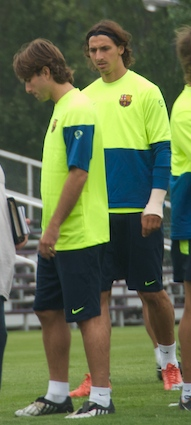
Maxwell and Zlatan Ibrahimović at Barcelona in 2009

Maxwell is known to be one of Zlatan Ibrahimović's closest friends; they were teammates at Ajax, Inter Milan, Barcelona and PSG. There are several anecdotes about him in Ibrahimović's autobiography, I Am Zlatan Ibrahimović. Ibrahimović states that Maxwell will be remembered for his calm nature and gentle style of play.

== Career statistics ==
=== Club ===
Club	Season	League			Cup		League Cup		Continental		Other		Total	
Club	Season	Division	Apps	Goals	Apps	Goals	Apps	Goals	Apps	Goals	Apps	Goals	Apps	Goals
Ajax	2001–02	Eredivisie	24	0	3	0	—		4	0	—		31	0
Ajax	2002–03	Eredivisie	30	4	2	0	—		12	0	1	0	45	4
Ajax	2003–04	Eredivisie	31	2	1	0	—		8	0	—		40	2
Ajax	2004–05	Eredivisie	29	3	3	0	—		7	1	1	0	40	4
Ajax	2005–06	Eredivisie	0	0	0	0	—		0	0	0	0	0	0
Ajax	Total		114	9	9	0	—		31	1	2	0	156	10
Internazionale	2006–07	Serie A	22	1	5	0	—		2	0	0	0	29	1
Internazionale	2007–08	Serie A	32	0	4	0	—		7	0	0	0	43	0
Internazionale	2008–09	Serie A	25	1	3	0	—		4	0	1	0	33	1
Internazionale	Total		79	2	12	0	—		13	0	1	0	105	2
Empoli (loan)	2005–06	Serie A	0	0	0	0	—		0	0	0	0	0	0
Barcelona	2009–10	La Liga	25	0	3	0	—		7	0	1	0	36	0
Barcelona	2010–11	La Liga	25	0	7	1	—		7	0	2	0	41	1
Barcelona	2011–12	La Liga	7	0	1	0	—		3	0	1	1	13	1
Barcelona	Total		57	0	11	1	—		17	0	5	1	90	2
Paris Saint-Germain	2011–12	Ligue 1	14	1	1	0	0	0	0	0	—		15	1
Paris Saint-Germain	2012–13	Ligue 1	33	2	3	0	2	0	10	0	—		48	2
Paris Saint-Germain	2013–14	Ligue 1	24	3	1	0	2	0	8	0	1	0	36	3
Paris Saint-Germain	2014–15	Ligue 1	26	3	2	0	2	1	10	0	0	0	40	4
Paris Saint-Germain	2015–16	Ligue 1	28	3	4	0	0	0	9	0	1	0	42	3
Paris Saint-Germain	2016–17	Ligue 1	20	0	5	0	3	0	4	0	1	0	33	0
Paris Saint-Germain	Total		145	12	16	0	9	1	41	0	3	0	214	13
Career total			395	23	48	1	9	1	102	1	11	1	565	27

=== International ===
Appearances and goals by national team and year

National team	Year	Apps	Goals
Brazil
Brazil	2013	7	0
Brazil	2014	3	0
Total		10	0

== Honours ==
Ajax

- Eredivisie: 2001–02, 2003–04
- KNVB Cup: 2001–02
- Johan Cruyff Shield: 2002

Inter Milan

- Serie A: 2006–07, 2007–08, 2008–09
- Supercoppa Italiana: 2008

Barcelona

- La Liga: 2009–10, 2010–11
- Copa del Rey: 2011–12
- Supercopa de España: 2009, 2010
- UEFA Champions League: 2010–11
- UEFA Super Cup: 2009
- FIFA Club World Cup: 2009, 2011

Paris Saint-Germain

- Ligue 1: 2012–13, 2013–14, 2014–15, 2015–16
- Coupe de France: 2014–15, 2015–16, 2016–17
- Coupe de la Ligue: 2013–14, 2014–15, 2015–16, 2016–17
- Trophée des Champions: 2013, 2015, 2016

Individual

- Ajax Talent of the Year (Marco van Basten Award): 2001–02
- Ajax Player of the Year (Rinus Michels Award): 2003–04
- Dutch Footballer of the Year: 2003–04
- Dutch Golden Shoe: 2003–04
- Ligue 1 Team of the Year: 2012–13, 2014–15, 2015–16
