= 2010 Supercoppa Italiana =

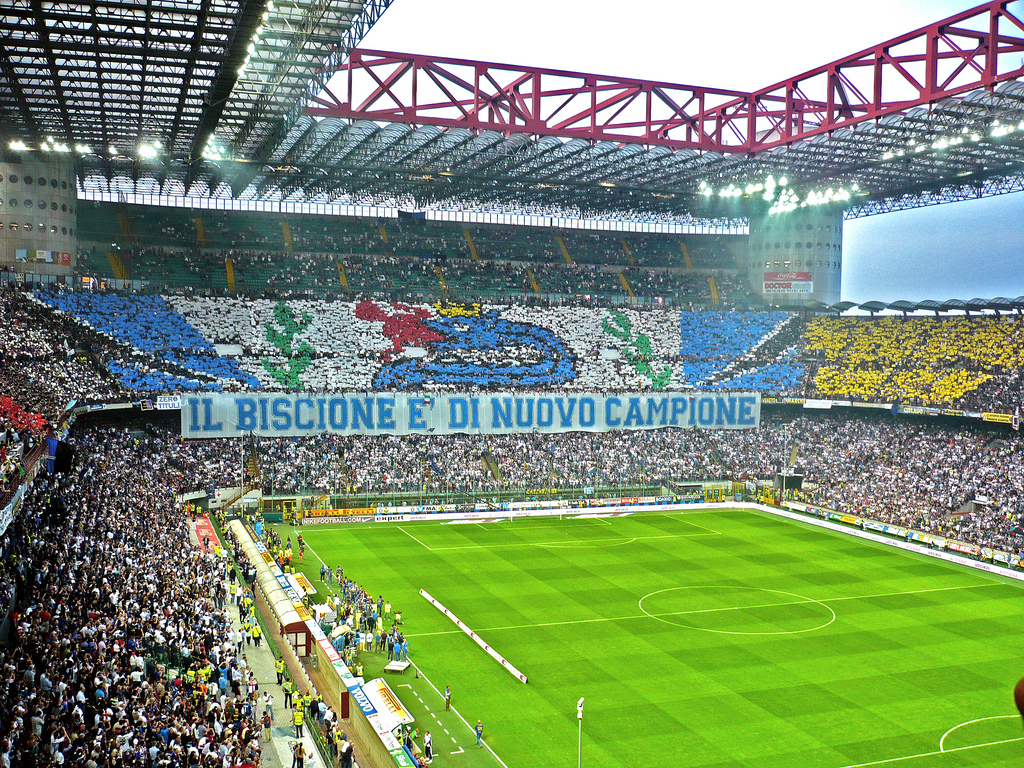
- The San Siro in Milan held the match
Inter Milan	Roma
3	1
- Date: 21 August 2010
- Venue: San Siro, Milan
- Referee: Mauro Bergonzi
- Attendance: 65,860
- Weather: Clear; 26 °C (79 °F)

The 2010 Supercoppa Italiana was the 23rd Supercoppa Italiana, an annual football match contested by the winners of the previous season's Serie A and Coppa Italia competitions. The match was played at the San Siro on 21 August 2010, and contested by league and cup double winners Inter Milan and cup runners-up Roma. The Supercoppa Italiana is usually contested by the winners of the Serie A and the Coppa Italia, but since Inter Milan won both the competitions, Roma were their opponents. Inter Milan won the title 3–1.

== Match details ==
21 August 2010
20:45 CEST

Inter Milan	3–1	Roma
Pandev 42'; Eto'o 70', 80'	Report	Riise 21'

San Siro, Milan
Attendance: 65,860
Referee: Mauro Bergonzi

Inter Milan	Roma

Internazionale:
GK	1	(Brazil) Júlio César
RB	13	(Brazil) Maicon
CB	6	(Brazil) Lúcio
CB	25	(Argentina) Walter Samuel	(yellow card) 90+4'
LB	26	(Romania) Cristian Chivu
DM	19	(Argentina) Esteban Cambiasso	(yellow card) 62'
DM	4	(Argentina) Javier Zanetti (c)		(substituted off) 45+1'
AM	10	(Netherlands) Wesley Sneijder		(substituted off) 88'
RW	27	(North Macedonia) Goran Pandev		(substituted off) 79'
LW	9	(Cameroon) Samuel Eto'o
CF	22	(Argentina) Diego Milito
Substitutes:
GK	12	(Italy) Luca Castellazzi
DF	2	(Colombia) Iván Córdoba
DF	23	(Italy) Marco Materazzi		(substituted on) 88'
MF	5	(Serbia) Dejan Stanković		(substituted on) 45+1'
MF	17	(Kenya) McDonald Mariga		(substituted on) 79'
MF	29	(Brazil) Philippe Coutinho
FW	88	(France) Jonathan Biabiany
Manager:
(Spain) Rafael Benítez

Roma:
GK	1	(Romania) Bogdan Lobonț
RB	77	(Italy) Marco Cassetti
CB	5	(France) Philippe Mexès	(yellow card) 90+2'
CB	4	(Brazil) Juan
LB	17	(Norway) John Arne Riise
RM	7	(Chile) David Pizarro		(substituted off) 54'
CM	16	(Italy) Daniele De Rossi
LM	20	(Italy) Simone Perrotta	(yellow card) 26'
AM	10	(Italy) Francesco Totti (c)
CF	9	(Montenegro) Mirko Vučinić		(substituted off) 67'
CF	94	(France) Jérémy Ménez		(substituted off) 83'
Substitutes:
GK	32	(Brazil) Doni
DF	25	(Argentina) Guillermo Burdisso
MF	11	(Brazil) Rodrigo Taddei		(substituted on) 54'
MF	33	(Italy) Matteo Brighi
MF	87	(Italy) Aleandro Rosi
FW	8	(Brazil) Adriano		(substituted on) 67'
FW	89	(Italy) Stefano Okaka	(yellow card) 85'	(substituted on) 83'
Manager:
(Italy) Claudio Ranieri

MAN OF THE MATCH

- Samuel Eto'o (Internazionale)

MATCH OFFICIALS

- Assistant referees: Nicoletti, Romagnoli
- Fourth official: De Marco

MATCH RULES

- 90 minutes.
- 30 minutes of extra-time if necessary.
- Penalty shoot-out if scores still level.
- Seven named substitutes
- Maximum of three substitutions.

Supercoppa Italiana
2010 Winners
Internazionale
Fifth title

== See also ==
- 2010–11 Inter Milan season
- 2010–11 AS Roma season

Played between same clubs:

- 2006 Supercoppa Italiana
- 2007 Supercoppa Italiana
- 2008 Supercoppa Italiana
