= 2008 Supercoppa Italiana =

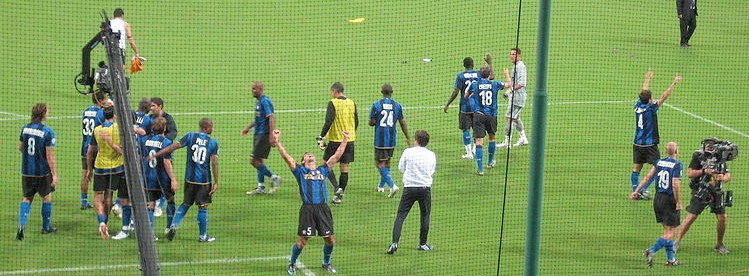
- Event: Supercoppa Italiana
Inter Milan	Roma
Serie A	Coppa Italia
2	2
- After extra time Internazionale won 6–5 on penalties
- Date: 24 August 2008
- Venue: San Siro, Milan, Italy
- Referee: Massimiliano Saccani
- Attendance: 43,400

The 2008 Supercoppa Italiana was a football match that was played by 2007–08 Serie A winners Inter Milan and 2007–08 Coppa Italia winners Roma. The match proved to be a tightly contested affair. After exchanging goals, it appeared that Inter Milan was on its way to victory on Mario Balotelli's goal on the 83rd minute, however, Mirko Vučinić tied the game for Roma at the 90th minute. Extra time settled nothing. In the penalty shoot-out, it appeared that a miss by Inter Milan's Dejan Stanković would be decisive, however, Roma captain Francesco Totti missed the team's fifth shot, which would have given his team the cup. In the seventh round, Roma's Juan missed while Inter Milan captain Javier Zanetti scored, ending the match in favour of the Serie A champions.

The match took place on 24 August 2008 in San Siro, Milan.

To date, this remains the only occasion on which manager José Mourinho won a trophy by a penalty shoot-out.

== Match details ==
24 August 2008
20:45 CEST

Inter Milan	2–2	Roma
Muntari 18'; Balotelli 83'	Report	De Rossi 59'; Vučinić 90'
Penalties
Ibrahimović (penalty scored); Balotelli (penalty scored); Stanković (penalty missed); Maxwell (penalty scored); Cambiasso (penalty scored); Jiménez (penalty scored); Zanetti (penalty scored)	6–5	(penalty scored) Vučinić; (penalty scored) Baptista; (penalty scored) Cassetti; (penalty scored) De Rossi; (penalty missed) Totti; (penalty scored) Pizarro; (penalty missed) Juan

San Siro, Milan
Attendance: 43,400
Referee: Massimiliano Saccani

Inter Milan	Roma

INTER (4–3–3):
GK	12	(Brazil) Júlio César
RB	13	(Brazil) Maicon
CB	16	(Argentina) Nicolás Burdisso		(substituted off) 91'
CB	19	(Argentina) Esteban Cambiasso
LB	6	(Brazil) Maxwell
CM	5	(Serbia) Dejan Stanković	(yellow card) 120'
CM	20	(Ghana) Sulley Muntari
CM	4	(Argentina) Javier Zanetti (c)
RW	7	(Portugal) Luís Figo		(substituted off) 67'
LW	33	(Brazil) Mancini		(substituted off) 72'
CF	8	(Sweden) Zlatan Ibrahimović	(yellow card) 40'
Substitutes:
GK	1	(Italy) Francesco Toldo
DF	24	(Colombia) Nelson Rivas		(substituted in) 91'
MF	30	(Portugal) Pelé
MF	11	(Chile) Luis Jiménez		(substituted in) 72'
FW	45	(Italy) Mario Balotelli	(yellow card) 113'	(substituted in) 67'
FW	9	(Argentina) Julio Cruz
FW	18	(Argentina) Hernán Crespo
Manager:
(Portugal) José Mourinho

ROMA (4–2–3–1):
GK	32	(Brazil) Doni
RB	77	(Italy) Marco Cassetti	(yellow card) 85'
CB	4	(Brazil) Juan
CB	5	(France) Philippe Mexès
LB	17	(Norway) John Arne Riise		(substituted off) 79'
DM	16	(Italy) Daniele De Rossi (c)
DM	7	(Chile) David Pizarro	(yellow card) 31'
RM	8	(Italy) Alberto Aquilani		(substituted off) 89'
AM	19	(Brazil) Júlio Baptista
LM	20	(Italy) Simone Perrotta		(substituted off) 86'
CF	9	(Montenegro) Mirko Vučinić	(yellow card) 12'
Substitutes:
GK	25	(Brazil) Artur
DF	2	(Italy) Christian Panucci
DF	15	(Italy) Simone Loria
DF	22	(Italy) Max Tonetto		(substituted in) 79'
MF	33	(Italy) Matteo Brighi
FW	89	(Italy) Stefano Okaka		(substituted in) 89'
FW	10	(Italy) Francesco Totti		(substituted in) 86'
Manager:
(Italy) Luciano Spalletti

MATCH OFFICIALS

- Assistant referees:
- Fourth official:

MATCH RULES

- 90 minutes.
- 30 minutes of extra-time if necessary.
- Penalty shoot-out if scores still level.
- Seven named substitutes
- Maximum of 3 substitutions.

== See also ==
- 2008–09 Inter Milan season
- 2008–09 AS Roma season

Played between same clubs:

- 2006 Supercoppa Italiana
- 2007 Supercoppa Italiana
- 2010 Supercoppa Italiana
