= 2003–04 Inter Milan season =

Internazionale
2003–04 season
- Owner: Massimo Moratti
- President: Massimo Moratti (until 29 January 2004); Giacinto Facchetti
- Head coach: Héctor Cúper (until 18 October 2003); Alberto Zaccheroni
- Stadium: San Siro
- Serie A: 4th
- Coppa Italia: Semi-finals
- UEFA Champions League: Group stage (3rd)
- UEFA Cup: Quarter-finals
- Top goalscorer: League: Christian Vieri (13); All: Christian Vieri (17)
- Highest home attendance: 75,831 vs AC Milan, 5 October 2003
- Lowest home attendance: 49,805 vs Empoli, 18 January 2004
- Average home league attendance: 58,352
Home colours	Away colours	Third colours

The 2003–04 season was Football Club Internazionale Milano's 95th in existence and 88th consecutive season in the top flight of Italian football.

== Season overview ==
The 2003–04 season started with a lot of issues: despite assembling an expensive squad, Inter got poor results in the domestic league (two wins, three draws and a loss in derby) and Héctor Cúper was sacked. In order to replace him, Alberto Zaccheroni was appointed coach before eventually finishing fourth in the league. Inter's campaign in the Champions League, however, resulted in failure: they didn't manage to get past the group stage, despite a historical win over Arsenal (0-3 in Highbury).

In January 2004, Massimo Moratti decided to leave his position of chairman, to be replaced by former player Giacinto Facchetti, who remained as chairman until his death on 4 September 2006.

== Players ==
=== Squad information ===
Note: Flags indicate national team as defined under FIFA eligibility rules; some limited exceptions apply. Players may hold more than one non-FIFA nationality.

No.	Pos.	Nation	Player
1	GK	ITA	Francesco Toldo
2	DF	COL	Iván Córdoba
3	FW	SLE	Mohamed Kallon
4	DF	ARG	Javier Zanetti
5	MF	TUR	Emre Belözoğlu
6	MF	ITA	Cristiano Zanetti
7	MF	NED	Andy van der Meyde
8	MF	FRA	Sabri Lamouchi
9	FW	ARG	Julio Cruz
10	FW	BRA	Adriano
11	MF	BRA	Luciano
11	MF	SCG	Dejan Stanković
12	GK	ITA	Alberto Fontana
13	DF	DEN	Thomas Helveg
14	MF	ESP	Javier Farinós
15	DF	ITA	Daniele Adani
17	DF	ITA	Fabio Cannavaro

No.	Pos.	Nation	Player
18	MF	ARG	Kily González
19	MF	GRE	Giorgos Karagounis
20	FW	URU	Álvaro Recoba
21	MF	ITA	Nicola Beati
22	MF	TUR	Okan Buruk
23	DF	ITA	Marco Materazzi
24	DF	PAR	Gamarra
25	MF	ARG	Matías Almeyda
26	DF	ITA	Giovanni Pasquale
28	MF	ITA	Mario Rebecchi
30	FW	NGR	Obafemi Martins
31	DF	FRA	Jérémie Bréchet
32	FW	ITA	Christian Vieri
33	FW	NGR	Isah Eliakwu
71	GK	ITA	Alex Cordaz
77	DF	ITA	Francesco Coco

==== From youth squad ====
Note: Flags indicate national team as defined under FIFA eligibility rules; some limited exceptions apply. Players may hold more than one non-FIFA nationality.

No.	Pos.	Nation	Player
27	MF	SEN	Khalilou Fadiga
34	DF	ITA	Devis Nossa
51	GK	ITA	Giacomo Bindi

No.	Pos.	Nation	Player
71	GK	ITA	Alex Cordaz
84	GK	ITA	Simone Villanova (on loan from Cittadella)
36	GK	AUS	Nathan Coe

=== Transfers ===
In
Pos.	Name	from	Type
FW	Julio Cruz	Bologna	€9.50 million
MF	Kily González	Valencia	€2.50 million
MF	Andy van der Meyde	Ajax	€6.00 million
MF	Sabri Lamouchi	Parma	
MF	Khalilou Fadiga	Auxerre	€0.30 million
DF	Thomas Helveg	Milan	
MF	Giorgos Karagounis	Panathinaikos	free
DF	Jérémie Bréchet	Lyon	€3.00 million
MF	Luciano	Chievo	loan
MF	Javier Farinós	Villarreal	loan ended
MF	Giacomo Bindi	Arezzo	loan
MF	Simone Villanova	Cittadella	loan
DF	Matteo Giordano	Milan	co-ownership
DF	Simone Brunelli	Milan	co-ownership
DF	Matteo Deinite	Milan	co-ownership
DF	Ronny Toma	Milan	co-ownership

Out
Pos.	Name	To	Type
FW	Hernán Crespo	Chelsea	€26.00 million
MF	Sérgio Conceição	Lazio	free
MF	Luigi Di Biagio	Brescia	free
DF	Michele Serena		retired
DF	Nelson Vivas	River Plate	
FW	Gabriel Batistuta	Roma	loan ended
MF	Domenico Morfeo	Parma	loan
MF	Guly	Bologna	loan
DF	Gonzalo Sorondo	Standard Liège	loan
MF	Stéphane Dalmat	Tottenham	loan
FW	Nicola Ventola	Siena	loan
GK	Sebastien Frey	Parma	co-ownership ended
MF	Ronny Toma	Legnano	loan
MF	Matteo Deinite	Pergolettese	loan
MF	Matteo Giordano	Castel di Sangro	loan
MF	Ümit Davala	Werder Bremen	loan
FW	Nicola Napolitano	Spezia	loan
DF	Mattia Altobelli	Spezia	loan
DF	Wellington	Spezia	loan
DF	Luca Franchini	Padova	loan
FW	Goran Pandev	Ancona	loan
FW	Nicola Beati	Triestina	loan
GK	Mathieu Moreau	Spezia	loan
DF	Mario Rebecchi	Genoa	loan
FW	Isah Eliakwu	Parma	loan
DF	Alessandro Potenza	Parma	loan
MF	Salvatore Ferraro	Milan	co-ownership
DF	Alessandro Livi	Milan	co-ownership
MF	Giuseppe Ticli	Milan	co-ownership
GK	Marco Varaldi	Milan	co-ownership

==== Winter ====
In
Pos.	Name	from	Type
FW	Adriano	Parma	€23.4 million (Note: Inter did not disclose the exact amount until they submitted an attached "Player identification table" into the 2008–09 statutory financial filing in CCIAA, which showed Adriano's value as €32.2 million and Dejan Stanković's as €6.165 million. According to old accounting standards, the €32.2 million consisted of €8.8 million the value of retained half, plus the bought back value actually paid to Parma, and other cost that could be capitalized (if any). Adriano plus Stanković matched the amount in Relazione sulla Gestione (Sports Report) of 2003–04 filing: €38,517,898, and the amount reported by La Repubblica for Adriano only (about €23 million).21 January 2004)
MF	Dejan Stanković	Lazio	€4,0 million
MF	Ianis Zicu	Dinamo București	

Out
Pos.	Name	To	Type
FW	Goran Pandev	Lazio	€500, January
MF	Luciano	Chievo	loan ended
MF	Ianis Zicu	Parma	loan

== Competitions ==
=== Overview ===
Competition	First match	Last match	Starting round	Final position	Record							
Competition	First match	Last match	Starting round	Final position	Pld	W	D	L	GF	GA	GD	Win %
Serie A	31 August 2003	16 May 2004	Matchday 1	4th	34	17	8	9	59	37	+22	50.00
Coppa Italia	4 December 2003	12 February 2004	Round of 16	Semi-finals	6	2	4	0	10	6	+4	33.33
Champions League	17 September 2003	10 December 2003	Group stage	Group stage	6	2	2	2	8	11	−3	33.33
UEFA Cup	26 February 2004	14 April 2004	Third round	Quarter-finals	6	1	3	2	6	7	−1	16.67
Total					52	22	17	13	83	61	+22	42.31

Last updated: 16 May 2004
Source: Serie A statistics, Coppa Italia statistics, Champions League statistics, UEFA Cup statistics

=== Serie A ===
==== League table ====
Pos	Team	Pld	W	D	L	GF	GA	GD	Pts	Qualification or relegation
2	Roma	34	21	8	5	68	19	+49	71	Qualification to Champions League group stage
3	Juventus	34	21	6	7	67	42	+25	69	Qualification to Champions League third qualifying round
4	Internazionale	34	17	8	9	59	37	+22	59	Qualification to Champions League third qualifying round
5	Parma	34	16	10	8	57	46	+11	58	Qualification to UEFA Cup first round
6	Lazio	34	16	8	10	52	38	+14	56	Qualification to UEFA Cup first round

Source: Almanacco Illustrato del Calcio – La Storia 1898-2004, Panini Edizioni, Modena, September 2005
Rules for classification: 1) points; 2) tiebreaker for relevant positions 3) head-to-head points and goal difference; 4) head-to-head goals scored; 5) goal difference; 6) number of goals scored.

==== Results summary ====
Overall								Home						Away					
Pld	W	D	L	GF	GA	GD	Pts	W	D	L	GF	GA	GD	W	D	L	GF	GA	GD
34	17	8	9	59	37	+22	59	9	4	4	31	15	+16	8	4	5	28	22	+6

Last updated: 16 May 2004.
Source: Competitive matches

==== Results by round ====
Round	1	2	3	4	5	6	7	8	9	10	11	12	13	14	15	16	17	18	19	20	21	22	23	24	25	26	27	28	29	30	31	32	33	34
Ground	H	A	H	A	H	A	H	A	H	H	A	H	A	A	H	A	H	A	H	A	H	A	H	A	H	A	A	H	A	H	H	A	H	A
Result	W	W	D	D	L	D	D	W	W	W	W	W	W	L	W	L	L	D	W	D	L	L	L	L	D	W	W	W	W	W	D	L	W	W
Position	3	5	4	4	6	8	9	6	5	4	4	4	4	4	4	4	4	4	4	4	5	6	6	7	7	6	6	6	5	4	4	4	4	4

Source: Competitive matches
A = Away; H = Home; W = Win; D = Draw; L = Loss; = Leader, UEFA Champions League Groups stage; = UEFA Champions League Groups stage; = UEFA Champions League Qualifying round; = 2004–05 UEFA Cup; = 2004–05 Serie B

==== Matches ====
31 August 2003 1	Inter	2–0	Modena	Milan
15:00 CEST	Emre (yellow card) 24'; Vieri 86'; Materazzi 94'; Vieri 95'	Report	Marasco (yellow card) 20'; Ballotta (yellow card) 84'; Ungari (yellow card) 94'	Stadium: Giuseppe Meazza; Referee: Stefano Farina

14 September 2003 2	Siena	0–1	Internazionale	Siena
15:00 CEST	Cufré (yellow card) 35'; Delli Carri (yellow card) 81'; D'Aversa (yellow card) 89'	Report	Materazzi 29'; Helveg (yellow card) 90+2'	Stadium: Stadio Artemio Franchi – Montepaschi Arena; Referee: Gianluca Paparesta

21 September 2003 3	Internazionale	0–0	Sampdoria	Milan
15:00 CEST	Martins (yellow card)	Report	Carrozzieri (yellow card) 41'; Diana (yellow card) 87'; Bettarini (yellow card) 90'; Palombo (yellow card) 90+8'	Stadium: San Siro; Referee: Pierluigi Collina

27 September 2003 4	Udinese	0–0	Internazionale	Udine
20:30 CEST	Pieri (yellow card) 16'; Castromán (yellow card) 32'; Pizarro (penalty missed) 66'; Jancker (yellow card) 84'; Kroldrup (red card) 89'	Report	Cannavaro (yellow card) 13'; Luciano (red card) 17'; Kallon (yellow card) 33'; Materazzi 45+1'; Helveg (yellow card) 65'	Stadium: Stadio Friuli; Attendance: Paolo Dondarini

5 October 2003 5	Internazionale	1–3	Milan	Milan
20:30 CEST	van der Meyde 36'; González (yellow card) 43'; Cannavaro (yellow card) 50'; Córdoba (yellow card) 71'; Martins 78'	Report	Inzaghi 39'; Kaká (yellow card) 43' (goal) 46'; Nesta (yellow card) 45+2'; Shevchenko 77'	Stadium: San Siro; Attendance: 75,831; Referee: Massimo De Santis

18 October 2003 6	Brescia	2–2	Internazionale	Brescia
18:00 CEST	R. Baggio 21'; Caracciolo 49'	Report	Cruz 62'; Vieri 87' (pen.)	Stadium: Stadio Mario Rigamonti; Attendance: Tiziano Pieri

26 October 2003 7	Internazionale	0–0	Roma	Milan
20:30 CEST	C. Zanetti (yellow card) 66'	Report	Chivu (yellow card) 22'	Stadium: San Siro; Attendance: 68,641; Referee: Pierluigi Collina

2 November 2003 8	Chievo	0–2	Internazionale	Verona
20:30 CET	D'Anna (yellow card) 12'; Marchegiani (red card) 35'; Lanna (yellow card) 35'; Perrotta (yellow card) 67'	Report	Almeyda (yellow card) 33'; Emre (yellow card) 63'; Vieri 64'; Recoba 67'; C. Zanetti (yellow card) 79'	Stadium: Stadio Marcantonio Bentegodi; Referee: Domenico Messina

9 November 2003 9	Internazionale	3–0	Ancona	Milan
15:00 CET	Cruz 26'; Vieri (yellow card) 28'; Materazzi 50'; Vieri 80'	Report	Carrus (yellow card) 25'; Viali (yellow card) 73'	Stadium: San Siro; Referee: Marco Gabriele

22 November 2003 10	Internazionale	6–0	Reggina	Milan
20:30 CET	Vieri (yellow card) 24' (goal) 75'; Cannavaro 34'; Pasquale (yellow card) 41'; Martins 42' van der Meyde 50'; Farinós 60'; Cruz 67'	Report	Baiocco (yellow card) 81'	Stadium: San Siro; Referee: Massimo De Santis

29 November 2003 11	Juventus	1–3	Internazionale	Turin
20:30 CET	Nedvěd (yellow card) 27'; Appiah (yellow card) 65'; Montero (yellow card) 71' (goal) 90'; Tacchinardi (yellow card) 90+2'	Report	Cruz 12', 68' (yellow card) 24'; Pasquale (yellow card) 30'; Adani (yellow card) 62'; Martins 77'	Stadium: Stadio delle Alpi; Attendance: 53,883; Referee: Matteo Trefoloni

7 December 2003 12	Internazionale	2–1	Perugia	Milan
15:00 CET	Vieri 25', 81'; J. Zanetti (yellow card) 45+2'	Report	Berrettoni (yellow card) 45'; Ignoffo (yellow card) 64'; Tedesco 89'	Stadium: San Siro; Referee: Stefano Farina

14 December 2003 13	Bologna	0–2	Internazionale	Bologna
15:00 CET	Signori (yellow card) 31'	Report	Martins 30'; Recoba 39'; Almeyda (yellow card) 90+2'	Stadium: Stadio Renato Dall'Ara; Referee: Tiziano Pieri

21 December 2003 14	Lazio	2–1	Internazionale	Rome
20:30 CET	Corradi 42'; Fiore (yellow card) 73'; Zauri 82'; Delgado (yellow card) 90+1'; Favalli (yellow card) 90+4'	Report	Vieri 30'; Almeyda (yellow card) 68' (yellow-red card) 69'	Stadium: Stadio Olimpico; Referee: Matteo Trefoloni

6 January 2004 15	Internazionale	3–1	Lecce	Milan
15:00 CET	Emre (yellow card) 44'; Cruz 49'; Córdoba 59'; Vieri 84'; Farinós (yellow card) 87'	Report	Bovo 3'; Chevantón (yellow card) 87'	Stadium: San Siro; Referee: Pasquale Rodomonti

10 January 2004 16	Parma	1–0	Internazionale	Parma
20:30 CET	Donadel (yellow card) 24'; Cannavaro (yellow card) 31'; E. Filippini 41' (yellow card) 76'	Report		Stadium: Stadio Ennio Tardini; Referee: Paolo Bertini

18 January 2004 17	Internazionale	0–1	Empoli	Milan
15:00 CET	Córdoba (yellow card) 52'; Emre (yellow card) 62' (yellow-red card) 63'	Report	Rocchi 90+1'	Stadium: San Siro; Referee: Gianluca Paparesta

25 January 2004 18	Modena	1–1	Internazionale	Modena
15:00 CET	Vignaroli (yellow card) 29'; Makinwa 41'	Report	Recoba 11'; Farinós (yellow card) 37'; Córdoba (yellow card) 73'	Stadium: Stadio Alberto Braglia; Referee: Pierluigi Collina

1 February 2004 19	Internazionale	4–0	Siena	Milan
20:30 CET	Recoba 22', 67' (pen.); Adriano 49', 79'; Farinós (yellow card) 54'	Report	D'Aversa (yellow card) 20'; Guigou (yellow card) 39'	Stadium: San Siro; Referee: Pasquale Rodomonti

8 February 2004 20	Sampdoria	2–2	Internazionale	Genoa
15:00 CET	Conte (yellow card) 4' (yellow-red card) 90'; Cipriani 56'; Zenoni (yellow card) 78'; Doni 86' (pen.)	Report	Helveg (yellow card) 28'; Vieri 31', 78'	Stadium: Stadio Luigi Ferraris; Referee: Gianluca Paparesta

15 February 2004 21	Internazionale	1–2	Udinese	Milan
15:00 CET	Cruz 71'	Report	Pinzi 51'; Fava Passaro 66'	Stadium: San Siro; Referee: Luca Palanca

21 February 2004 22	Milan	3–2	Internazionale	Milan
20:30 CET	Shevchenko (yellow card) 31'; Cafu (yellow card) 52'; Tomasson 56'; Kaká 57' (yellow card) 88'; Nesta (yellow card) 61'; Seedorf 85'	Report	Stanković 15'; González (yellow card) 31'; C. Zanetti 40' (yellow card) 54'; Córdoba (yellow card) 41'	Stadium: San Siro; Attendance: 78,334; Referee: Roberto Rosetti

29 February 2004 23	Internazionale	1–3	Brescia	Milan
15:00 CET	Stanković 48' (red card) 87'; C. Zanetti (yellow card) 51'	Report	Colucci (yellow card) 11'; Di Biagio (yellow card) 17'; Caracciolo (yellow card) 57' (goal) 67', 81'; Del Nero 73'	Stadium: San Siro; Referee: Nicola Ayroldi

7 March 2004 24	Roma	4–1	Internazionale	Rome
20:30 CET	Cassano 45'; Mancini 63', 90+3'; Totti 89' (pen.); Emerson (yellow card) 90+2'	Report	Helveg (yellow card) 31'; Adani (yellow card) 42'; Farinós (yellow card) 58'; C. Zanetti (yellow card) 61'; Vieri 73'	Stadium: Stadio Olimpico; Referee: Roberto Rosetti

14 March 2004 25	Internazionale	0–0	Chievo	Milan
15:00 CET		Report	Baronio (yellow card) 43'	Stadium: San Siro; Referee: Massimo De Santis

21 March 2004 26	Ancona	0–2	Internazionale	Ancona
15:00 CET	Marco Esposito (yellow card) 54'; Berretta (yellow card) 68'	Report	C. Zanetti (yellow card) 17'; Recoba 61'; Adani 70'; Córdoba (yellow card) 76'	Stadium: Stadio del Conero; Referee: Luca Palanca

28 March 2004 27	Reggina	0–2	Internazionale	Reggio Calabria
	Paredes (yellow card) 37'	Report	C. Zanetti (yellow card) 24'; Bonazzoli 42' (o.g.); Córdoba (yellow card) 45+3'; Pasquale (yellow card) 58'; Farinós (yellow card) 90+2'; Adriano 90+3'	Stadium: Stadio Oreste Granillo; Referee: Pasquale Rodomonti

4 April 2004 28	Internazionale	3–2	Juventus	Milan
20:30 CEST	Martins 6'; Vieri 45' (pen.); Stanković 47'; Farinós (yellow card) 55'	Report	Montero (yellow card) 11' (yellow-red card) 62'; González 25' (o.g.); Di Vaio 90+3'	Stadium: San Siro; Attendance: 72,029; Referee: Pierluigi Collina

11 April 2004 29	Perugia	2–3	Internazionale	Perugia
15:00 CEST	Manfredini (yellow card) 2'; Di Francesco (yellow card) 21'; Di Francesco 50'; Hübner 56'; Diamoutene (yellow card) 81'; Di Loreto (yellow card) 89'	Report	Adriano 24', 86'; Farinós (yellow card) 52'; Martins 88'	Stadium: Stadio Renato Curi; Attendance: 15,055; Referee: Domenico Messina

18 April 2004 30	Internazionale	4–2	Bologna	Milan
15:00 CEST	Recoba 32'; Cannavaro 52'; Stanković 55'; Martins 71'	Report	Nervo (yellow card) 22'; Dalla Bona (yellow card) 28'; Bellucci 67', 76'; Natali (yellow card) 88'	Stadium: San Siro; Attendance: 49,753; Referee: Daniele Tombolini

25 April 2004 31	Internazionale	0–0	Lazio	Milan
15:00 CEST	Farinós (yellow card) 39'; Córdoba (yellow card) 82'	Report	Mihajlović (yellow card) 85'; Giannichedda (yellow card) 90'	Stadium: San Siro; Referee: Pierluigi Collina

2 May 2004 32	Lecce	2–1	Internazionale	Lecce
15:00 CEST	Siviglia (yellow card) 27'; Ledesma (yellow card) 37'; Konan (yellow card) 43'; Tonetto 47'; Bovo 70'; Abruzzese (yellow card) 90'	Report	Adriano 36' (pen.); Pasquale (yellow card) 45'; Materazzi (yellow card) 58'	Stadium: Stadio Via del Mare; Referee: Roberto Rosetti

9 May 2004 33	Internazionale	1–0	Parma	Milan
15:00 CEST	González (yellow card) 38'; Adriano 62'; C. Zanetti (yellow card) 64'; Emre (yellow card) 67'; Vieri (yellow card) 70'	Report	Blasi (yellow card) 38' (yellow-red card) 78'; Barone (yellow card) 29'	Stadium: San Siro; Referee: Roberto Rosetti

16 May 2004 34	Empoli	2–3	Internazionale	Empoli
15:00 CEST	Lucchini 18'; Foggia (yellow card) 72'; Rocchi 83'	Report	Materazzi (yellow card) 18'; Adriano 45+1', 69'; Córdoba (yellow card) 63'; Recoba 65'; C. Zanetti (yellow card) 90+1'	Stadium: Stadio Carlo Castellani; Referee: Stefano Farina

=== Coppa Italia ===
==== Round of 16 ====
4 December 2003 First leg	Internazionale	2–1	Reggina	Milan
21:00 CET	Cruz 61', 75'	Report	Di Michele 55'	Stadium: San Siro; Referee: Luca Palanca

17 December 2003 Second leg	Reggina	1–1 (1–3 agg.)	Internazionale	Reggio Calabria
21:00 CET	de León 38'	Report	Belardi 90' (o.g.)	Stadium: Stadio Oreste Granillo; Referee: Daniele Tombolini

==== Quarter-finals ====
13 January 2004 First leg	Udinese	0–0	Internazionale	Udine
21:00 CET		Report		Stadium: Stadio Friuli; Referee: Stefano Farina

21 January 2004 Second leg	Internazionale	3–1 (3–1 agg.)	Udinese	Milan
17:30 CET	van der Meyde 16'; Martins 51'; Cruz 63'	Report	Fava 35'	Stadium: San Siro; Referee: Domenico Messina

==== Semi-finals ====
4 February 2004 First leg	Juventus	2–2	Internazionale	Turin
21:00 CET	Di Vaio 7', 70'	Report	Adriano 3', 35'; Toldo (red card) 63'	Stadium: Stadio delle Alpi; Attendance: 25,237; Referee: Paolo Bertini

12 February 2004 Second leg	Internazionale	2–2 (4–4 agg.) (4–5 p)	Juventus	Milan
21:00 CET	Adriano 7'; Córdoba (red card) 67'; Adani 90+5'	Report	Tudor 40'; Del Piero 78'	Stadium: San Siro; Attendance: 65,000; Referee: Emilio Pellegrino
	Penalties
	Farinós (penalty scored); Adriano (penalty scored); Stanković (penalty scored); Helveg (penalty scored); Vieri (penalty missed)		(penalty scored) Del Piero; (penalty scored) Maresca; (penalty scored) Nedvěd; (penalty scored) Legrottaglie; (penalty scored) Miccoli

=== UEFA Champions League ===
==== Group stage ====
Pos	Team	Pld	W	D	L	GF	GA	GD	Pts	Qualification	ARS	LMO	INT	DKV
1	(England) Arsenal	6	3	1	2	9	6	+3	10	Advance to knockout stage	—	2–0	0–3	1–0
2	(Russia) Lokomotiv Moscow	6	2	2	2	7	7	0	8	Advance to knockout stage	0–0	—	3–0	3–2
3	(Italy) Internazionale	6	2	2	2	8	11	−3	8	Transfer to UEFA Cup	1–5	1–1	—	2–1
4	(Ukraine) Dynamo Kyiv	6	2	1	3	8	8	0	7		2–1	2–0	1–1	—

17 September 2003 1	Arsenal (England)	0–3	(Italy) Internazionale	London, England
20:45 CET		Report	Cruz 22' van der Meyde 24'; Martins 41'	Stadium: Highbury; Attendance: 34,393; Referee: Manuel Mejuto González (Spain)

1 October 2003 2	Internazionale (Italy)	2–1	(Ukraine) Dynamo Kyiv	Milan, Italy
20:45 CET	Adani 21'; Emre (yellow card) 53'; Vieri 90'	Report	Rincón (yellow card) 19'; Fedorov 34'; Sablić (yellow card) 41'; Leko (yellow card) 45'	Stadium: San Siro; Attendance: 70,882; Referee: Stéphane Bré (France)

21 October 2003 3	Lokomotiv Moscow (Russia)	3–0	(Italy) Internazionale	Moscow, Russia
18:30 CET	Loskov 2'; Ashvetia 50'; Khokhlov 57'	Report	Bréchet (yellow card) 57'; Zanetti (yellow card) 77'; Recoba (yellow card) 82'; Cannavaro (yellow card) 90'	Stadium: Lokomotiv Stadium; Attendance: 25,000; Referee: Franz-Xaver Wack (Germany)

5 November 2003 4	Internazionale (Italy)	1–1	(Russia) Lokomotiv Moscow	Milan, Italy
20:45 CET	Recoba 14'; González (yellow card) 29'; Materazzi (yellow card) 64'	Report	Loskov 54' (yellow card) 65'	Stadium: San Siro; Attendance: 25,000; Referee: Frank De Bleeckere (Belgium)

25 November 2003 5	Internazionale (Italy)	1–5	(England) Arsenal	Milan, Italy
20:45 CET	Vieri 33'	Report	Henry 25', 85'; Cygan (yellow card) 61'; Ljungberg 49'; Edu 88'; Pires 89'	Stadium: San Siro; Attendance: 85,400; Referee: Wolfgang Stark (Germany)

10 December 2003 6	Dynamo Kyiv (Ukraine)	1–1	(Italy) Internazionale	Kyiv, Ukraine
20:45 CET	Rincón 85'	Report	Vieri (yellow card) 66'; Adani 68'; Pasquale (yellow card) 84'	Stadium: Olimpiyskiy NSC; Attendance: 30,000; Referee: Gilles Veissière (France)

=== UEFA Cup ===
==== Third round ====
26 February 2004 First leg	Sochaux (France)	2–2	(Italy) Internazionale	Montbéliard, France
21:00 CET	Oruma (yellow card) 52'; Frau 59', 81'	Report	Vieri 8'; Recoba 61'; Adani (yellow card) 88'	Stadium: Stade Auguste Bonal; Referee: Luis Medina Cantalejo (Spain)

3 March 2004 Second leg	Internazionale (Italy)	0–0 (a2–2 agg.)	(France) Sochaux	Milan, Italy
21:00 CET	Helveg (yellow card) 26'; Cruz (yellow card) 57'; Vieri (red card) 86'	Report	Pedretti (yellow card) 70'	Stadium: San Siro; Referee: Steve Bennett (England)

==== Eightfinals ====
11 March 2004 First leg	Benfica (Portugal)	0–0	(Italy) Internazionale	Lisbon, Portugal
21:00 CET		Report		Stadium: Estádio da Luz; Referee: Jan Wegereef (Netherlands)

25 March 2004 Second leg	Internazionale (Italy)	4–3 (4–3 agg.)	(Portugal) Benfica	Milan, Italy
21:00 CET	Buruk (yellow card) 42'; Martins 45+1', 70'; Recoba 60'; Vieri 64'	Report	Nuno Gomes 36', 67'; Tiago 77'	Stadium: San Siro; Referee: Alain Sars (France)

==== Quarter-finals ====
8 April 2004 First leg	Marseille (France)	1–0	(Italy) Internazionale	Marseille, France
21:00 CET	Drogba 46'	Report		Stadium: Stade Vélodrome; Referee: Lucílio Batista (Portugal)

14 April 2004 Second leg	Internazionale (Italy)	0–1 (0–2 agg.)	(France) Marseille	Milan, Italy
20:45 CET	Almeyda (yellow card) 34'; González (yellow card) 90+1'	Report	Batlles (yellow card) 28'; Meriem 74'; Marlet (yellow card) 76'	Stadium: San Siro; Referee: Alain Sars (France)

== Statistics ==
=== Squad statistics ===
	League	UCL	CU	Cup	Total Stats
Games played	38	6	6	6	56
Games won	17	2	1	2	22
Games drawn	8	2	3	4	17
Games lost	9	2	2	0	13
Goals scored	59	8	6	10	83
Goals conceded	37	11	7	6	61
Goal difference	22	-3	-1	4	22
Clean sheets	15	1	2	1	19
Goal by substitute	–	–	–	–	–
Total shots	–	–	–	–	–
Shots on target	–	–	–	–	–
Corners	–	–	–	–	–
Players used	29	22	23	28	
Offsides	–	–	–	–	–
Fouls suffered	–	–	–	–	–
Fouls committed	–	–	–	–	–
Yellow cards	56	9	6	0	71
Red cards	4	0	1	2	7

Last updated: 16 May 2004
Source: Serie A statistics, UEFA Champions League statistics, Coppa Italia statistics

=== Appearances and goals ===
As of 16 May 2004

No.	Pos	Nat	Player	Total		Serie A		Coppa Italia		UEFA	
No.	Pos	Nat	Player	Apps	Goals	Apps	Goals	Apps	Goals	Apps	Goals
1	GK	(Italy) ITA	Toldo	45	0	32	0	2	0	11	0
4	DF	(Argentina) ARG	Zanetti J	51	0	34	0	5	0	12	0
15	DF	(Italy) ITA	Adani	34	4	20+3	1	3	1	8	2
17	DF	(Italy) ITA	Cannavaro	34	2	22	2	3	0	9	0
2	DF	(Colombia) COL	Cordoba	47	1	30+1	1	5	0	11	0
11	MF	(Serbia and Montenegro) SCG	Stankovic	16	4	14	4	2	0		
6	MF	(Italy) ITA	Zanetti C	29	1	19	1	0	0	10	0
5	MF	(Turkey) TUR	Emre	30	0	15+6	0	1+2	0	3+3	0
18	MF	(Argentina) ARG	Kily	32	0	17+4	0	4	0	7	0
9	FW	(Argentina) ARG	Julio Cruz	35	11	16+5	7	2+2	3	6+4	1
32	FW	(Italy) ITA	Vieri	32	17	18+4	13	1	0	8+1	4
12	GK	(Italy) ITA	Fontana	7	0	2	0	4	0	1	0
23	DF	(Italy) ITA	Materazzi	18	3	14	3	0	0	4	0
13	DF	(Denmark) DEN	Helveg	32	0	13+10	0	3	0	4+2	0
10	FW	(Brazil) BRA	Adriano	18	12	13+3	9	2	3		
20	FW	(Uruguay) URU	Recoba	29	11	12+7	8	2+1	0	4+3	3
14	MF	(Spain) ESP	Farinos	24	1	12+4	1	4+1	0	2+1	0
30	FW	(Nigeria) NGR	Martins	37	11	11+14	7	3	1	7+2	3
26	DF	(Italy) ITA	Pasquale	21	0	11+3	0	1+2	0	2+2	0
7	MF	(Netherlands) NED	van der Meyde	25	3	11+3	1	3+1	1	6+1	1
24	DF	(Paraguay) PAR	Gamarra	18	0	10	0	5	0	2+1	0
25	MF	(Argentina) ARG	Almeyda	21	0	8+3	0	2+1	0	5+2	0
8	MF	(France) FRA	Lamouchi	26	0	6+10	0	2+1	0	3+4	0
11	MF	(Brazil) BRA	Luciano	7	0	3+2	0	2	0		
77	DF	(Italy) ITA	Coco	4	0	3	0	0	0	0+1	0
19	MF	(Greece) GRE	Karagounis	16	0	2+7	0	2+1	0	3+1	0
31	DF	(France) FRA	Brechet	14	0	2+7	0	2	0	2+1	0
71	GK	(Italy) ITA	Cordaz	1	0	0	0	0+1	0	0	0
22	MF	(Turkey) TUR	Okan	9	0	0+3	0	0+2	0	2+2	0
27	MF	(Senegal) SEN	Fadiga								
28	MF	(Italy) ITA	Rebecchi	1	0	0	0	1	0	0	0
3	FW	(Sierra Leone) SLE	Kallon	7	0	4+1	0	0	0	0+2	0
33	FW	(Nigeria) NGR	Eliakwu	1	0	0	0	0+1	0	0	0
21	MF	(Italy) ITA	Beati								
