= 2002–03 Inter Milan season =

Inter Milan
2002–03 season
- Owner: Massimo Moratti
- President: Massimo Moratti
- Manager: Héctor Cúper
- Stadium: San Siro
- Serie A: 2nd
- Coppa Italia: Round of 16
- UEFA Champions League: Semi-finals
- Top goalscorer: League: Christian Vieri (24); All: Christian Vieri (27)
- Highest home attendance: 76,854 vs Milan, 13 May 2003
- Lowest home attendance: 54,825 vs Perugia, 24 May 2003
- Average home league attendance: 61,943
Home colours	Away colours	Third colours

For the Italian football club Inter Milan, the 2002–03 season marked its 94th in existence and its 87th consecutive season in the top flight of Italian football. The team finished second in Serie A and reached the semi-finals of the UEFA Champions League. Christian Vieri was the top goalscorer.

== Season summary ==
The start of the season was marked by the departure of Ronaldo and the arrival of Hernán Crespo, after club had already acquired Fabio Cannavaro, Matías Almeyda and Domenico Morfeo. Crespo, along with Christian Vieri, built a formidable attacking duo. Crespo was essential in the 2002–03 UEFA Champions League campaign, while Vieri usually scored in the domestic matches. Their partnership worked until Crespo sustained an injury, which sidelined him for several weeks. Without him, and despite replacing Crespo with Gabriel Batistuta, Inter lost some key matches. One of these was against Juventus who, could finally aim for the title.

Inter managed to reach the Champions League quarter-finals, after finishing second in the group phase. Inter's opponent was Valencia, against whom they won 1–0 at home. A 2–1 defeat in Spain had no effect on qualification, due to the away goals rule. As Crespo came back from injury, Vieri got injured, but he managed to retain the title of the league's top scorer, with 24 goals. In the semi-finals, Inter lost to Milan due to Andriy Shevchenko's away goal in the second leg, equalized by Obafemi Martins, for a 1–1 aggregate that sent Milan to the final on away goals. Focusing on the European competition, Inter collected two draws in the league that caused them to end the season as runners-up to Juventus, who won their second-straight title.

== Squad ==
Squad at end of season

Note: Flags indicate national team as defined under FIFA eligibility rules; some limited exceptions apply. Players may hold more than one non-FIFA nationality.

No.	Pos.	Nation	Player
1	GK	ITA	Francesco Toldo
2	DF	COL	Iván Córdoba
3	FW	SLE	Mohamed Kallon
4	DF	ARG	Javier Zanetti (captain)
5	MF	TUR	Emre Belözoğlu
6	MF	ITA	Cristiano Zanetti
7	MF	POR	Sérgio Conçeicão
9	FW	ARG	Hernán Crespo
10	MF	ITA	Domenico Morfeo
11	MF	ARG	Guly
12	GK	ITA	Alberto Fontana
13	DF	ITA	Fabio Cannavaro
14	MF	ITA	Luigi Di Biagio
15	DF	ITA	Daniele Adani
16	DF	URU	Gonzalo Sorondo
17	DF	ITA	Michele Serena
18	MF	FRA	Stéphane Dalmat
19	FW	ARG	Gabriel Batistuta
20	FW	URU	Álvaro Recoba

No.	Pos.	Nation	Player
21	MF	ITA	Nicola Beati
22	MF	TUR	Okan Buruk
23	DF	ITA	Marco Materazzi
24	DF	PAR	Carlos Gamarra
25	MF	ARG	Matias Almeyda
26	DF	ITA	Giovanni Pasquale
27	GK	FRA	Mathieu Moreau
30	FW	NGA	Obafemi Martins
31	DF	ARG	Nelson Vivas
32	FW	ITA	Christian Vieri
34	FW	ITA	Mattia Altobelli
40	DF	ITA	Luca Franchini
41	MF	ITA	Nicola Napolitano
43	DF	ITA	Alessandro Potenza
44	MF	ITA	Mario Rebecchi
45	FW	BRA	Wellington
65	GK	ITA	Enrico Rossi Chauvenet
77	DF	ITA	Francesco Coco
78	FW	ITA	Nicola Ventola

=== Left club during season ===
Note: Flags indicate national team as defined under FIFA eligibility rules; some limited exceptions apply. Players may hold more than one non-FIFA nationality.

No. / Pos. / Nation / Player; 8 / MF / ESP / Javier Farinós (on loan to Villarreal)	No. / Pos. / Nation / Player; 39 / DF / ITA / Salvatore Ferraro (on loan to Prato)

=== Transfers ===
In
Pos.	Name	from	Type
FW	Hernán Crespo	Lazio	€40.00 million
DF	Francesco Coco	Milan	€22.50 million
MF	Ümit Davala	Milan	€2.0 million
DF	Fabio Cannavaro	Parma	€23.10 million
MF	Matías Almeyda	Parma	€22.10 million
FW	Bernardo Corradi	Chievo Verona	€4.00 million
DF	Daniele Adani	Fiorentina	free
MF	Domenico Morfeo	Fiorentina	free
DF	Carlos Gamarra	Flamengo	free

Out
Pos.	Name	To	Type
FW	Ronaldo	Real Madrid	€45.00 million
MF	Clarence Seedorf	Milan	€22.50 million
DF	Dario Šimić	Milan	€5.0 million
DF	Vratislav Greško	Parma	€22.10 million
FW	Adriano	Parma	co-ownership
DF	Matteo Ferrari	Parma	co-ownership ended
FW	Bernardo Corradi	Lazio	€10.00 million
MF	Ümit Davala	Galatasaray	loan
DF	Pasquale Padalino	Bologna	loan ended
GK	Alex Cordaz	Spezia	loan
MF	Sixto Peralta	Racing Club	loan

==== Winter ====
In
Pos.	Name	from	Type
FW	Gabriel Batistuta	Roma	loan

Out
Pos.	Name	To	Type
MF	Francisco Farinós	Villarreal	loan

==== Loan out ====
- (Italy) Salvatore Ferraro – (Italy) Prato, loan
- (Italy) Alex Cordaz – (Italy) Spezia, loan
- (North Macedonia) Goran Pandev – (Italy) Spezia, loan

== Competitions ==
=== Overview ===
Competition	First match	Last match	Starting round	Final position	Record							
Competition	First match	Last match	Starting round	Final position	Pld	W	D	L	GF	GA	GD	Win %
Serie A	14 September 2002	24 May 2003	Matchday 1	Runners-up	33	19	7	7	64	38	+26	57.58
Coppa Italia	4 December 2002	19 December 2002	Round of 16	Round of 16	2	0	0	2	1	3	−2	0.00
Champions League	14 August 2002	13 May 2003	Third qualifying round	Semi-finals	18	8	7	3	28	19	+9	44.44
Total					53	27	14	12	93	60	+33	50.94

Last updated: 24 May 2003
Source: Serie A statistics Coppa Italia statistics, Champions League statistics

=== Serie A ===
==== League table ====
Pos	Team	Pld	W	D	L	GF	GA	GD	Pts	Qualification or relegation
1	Juventus (C)	34	21	9	4	64	29	+35	72	Qualification to Champions League group stage
2	Internazionale	34	19	8	7	64	38	+26	65	Qualification to Champions League group stage
3	Milan (Note: Milan qualified for the Champions League group stage as defending champions.)	34	18	7	9	55	30	+25	61	Qualification to Champions League group stage
4	Lazio	34	15	15	4	57	32	+25	60	Qualification to Champions League third qualifying round
5	Parma	34	15	11	8	55	36	+19	56 (Note: Parma finished ahead of Udinese on head-to-head points: Udinese 1–1 Parma, Parma 3–2 Udinese.)	Qualification to UEFA Cup first round

Source: 2002–03 Serie A, Soccerway
Rules for classification: 1) Points; 2) Head-to-head points; 3) Head-to-head goal difference; 4) Goal difference; 5) Goals scored; 6) Draw. (Note: Head-to-head record is used only after all the matches between the teams in question have been played).
(C) Champions

==== Results summary ====
Overall								Home						Away					
Pld	W	D	L	GF	GA	GD	Pts	W	D	L	GF	GA	GD	W	D	L	GF	GA	GD
34	19	8	7	64	38	+26	65	10	5	2	34	13	+21	9	3	5	30	25	+5

Last updated: 24 May 2003.
Source: Competitive matches

==== Results by round ====
Round	1	2	3	4	5	6	7	8	9	10	11	12	13	14	15	16	17	18	19	20	21	22	23	24	25	26	27	28	29	30	31	32	33	34
Ground	A	H	A	H	A	H	H	A	H	A	A	H	A	H	A	H	A	H	A	H	A	H	A	A	H	A	H	H	A	H	A	H	A	H
Result	W	W	W	W	W	D	W	W	L	D	L	W	D	W	W	W	L	W	W	W	L	W	L	W	W	L	D	L	W	D	D	D	W	D
Position	4	4	3	1	1	2	1	1	1	2	4	3	3	3	2	2	3	2	2	1	2	2	2	2	2	2	2	3	2	2	2	2	2	2

Source: Competitive matches
A = Away; H = Home; W = Win; D = Draw; L = Loss; = Leader, 2003-04 UEFA Champions League group stage; = 2003-04 UEFA Champions League group stage; = 2003-04 UEFA Champions League qualifying round; = 2003-04 UEFA Cup; = 2003-04 Serie B

==== Matches ====
14 September 2002 2	Inter	1–0	Torino	Milan
15:00 CEST (UTC+02:00)	Vieri 16'	Report	(red card) 42' Comotto	Stadium: Giuseppe Meazza; Attendance: 66,134; Referee: Paolo Bertini

22 September 2002 3	Reggina	1–2	Inter	Reggio Calabria
15:00 CEST (UTC+02:00)	Savoldi (yellow card) 11'; Mamede (yellow card) 85'; Nakamura 92' (pen.)	Report	7' Vieri; (yellow card) 88' Vivas; 93' Recoba	Stadium: Oreste Granillo; Attendance: 26,608; Referee: Pasquale Rodomonti

29 September 2002 4	Inter	2–1	Chievo	Milan
20:30 CEST (UTC+02:00)	Vieri 15'; Di Biagio (yellow card) 16'; Vieri (yellow card) 76'; Vieri 78' (pen.); Almeyda (yellow card) 84'; Conceição (red card) 93'	Report	3' Marazzina; (yellow card) 25' Moro; (yellow card) 55' Cossato	Stadium: Giuseppe Meazza; Attendance: 57,674; Referee: Salvatore Racalbuto

6 October 2002 5	Piacenza	1–4	Inter	Piacenza
15:00 CEST (UTC+02:00)	Hubner (red card) 57'; Maresca 73'; Tosto (yellow card)	Report	36'Di Biagio; 51'Di Biagio; 69' Recoba; 85'Crespo; (yellow card) Di Biagio	Stadium: Stadio Leonardo Garilli; Attendance: 15,029; Referee: Gianluca Paparesta

19 October 2002 6	Inter	1–1	Juventus	Milan
20:30 CEST (UTC+02:00)	Cordoba (yellow card) 39'; Recoba 77'; Morfeo (red card) 91'; Emre (yellow card) 80'; Vieri 95'	Report	(yellow card) 31' Iuliano; 89' (pen.) Del Piero; (red card) 91' Conte	Stadium: Giuseppe Meazza; Attendance: 76,166; Referee: Pierluigi Collina

27 October 2002 7	Inter	2–0	Bologna	Milan
15:00 CEST (UTC+02:00)	Materazzi 67'; Pasquale (yellow card) 85'; Vieri 92'; Emre (yellow card)	Report	9' Locatelli (yellow card) 15' Colucci (yellow card) 29' Frara; (yellow card) 53' Julio Cruz; (yellow card) 92' Paramatti	Stadium: Giuseppe Meazza; Attendance: 65,408; Referee: Fiorenzo Treossi

3 November 2002 8	Como	0–2	Internazionale	Como
15:00 CET (UTC+01:00)	Rossi (yellow card) 35'; Padalino (yellow card) 38'; Allegretti (yellow card) 43'; Pecchia (yellow card) 50'	Report	Cannavaro 48'; Vieri 58'; Recoba 65'	Stadium: Stadio Giuseppe Sinigaglia; Attendance: 12,452; Referee: Pierluigi Collina

6 November 2002 1	Empoli	3–4	Internazionale	Empoli
20:30 CEST (UTC+02:00)	Di Natale 16'; Vannucchi 61'; Giampieretti (yellow card) 78'; Tavano 92'	Report	6' Crespo; 11' J. Zanetti; (yellow card) 32' Vivas; 51' Recoba; (yellow card) 60' J. Zanetti; (yellow card) 73'Recoba; (yellow card) 80' Morfeo; 85' Adani	Stadium: Stadio Carlo Castellani; Attendance: 16,469; Referee: Emilio Pellegrino

9 November 2002 9	Internazionale	1–2	Udinese	Milan
18:00 CET (UTC+01:00)	Vieri 3'; Cordoba (yellow card) 70'	Report	25' Jørgensen; 30' Martinez; (yellow card) 43' Rossitto; (yellow card) 51' Gemitti; 55' Muzzi; (yellow card) 80' Bertotto; (yellow card) 94' Iaquinta	Stadium: Giuseppe Meazza; Attendance: 58,962; Referee: Stefano Farina

16 November 2002 10	Roma	2–2	Internazionale	Rome
20:30 CET (UTC+01:00)	Guigou (yellow card) 39'; Aldair (yellow card) 51'; Montella 59'; Batistuta 73'; Cassano (yellow card)	Report	(yellow card) 12' Okan; (yellow card) 52' Cannavaro; 58' Morfeo; 89' Okan; (yellow card) 90' Pasquale	Stadium: Olimpico; Attendance: 68,000; Referee: Salvatore Racalbuto

23 November 2002 11	Milan	1–0	Internazionale	Milan
20:30 CET (UTC+01:00)	Serginho 12'; Inzaghi (yellow card) 36'; Serginho (yellow card) 71'	Report	(yellow card) 23' Di Biagio; (yellow card) 39' Cordoba; 46' Vivas	Stadium: San Siro; Attendance: 78,843; Referee: Gianluca Paparesta

1 December 2002 12	Internazionale	4–0	Brescia	Milan
15:00 CET (UTC+01:00)	Vieri 3'; Vieri 13'; Morfeo 19'; Coco 37'; Vieri 58'; Vieri 89'; Di Biagio (yellow card) 45'; Conceicao (yellow card)	Report	(yellow card) 40' Petruzzi; (yellow card) Schopp	Stadium: Giuseppe Meazza; Attendance: 61,294; Referee: Emilio Pellegrino

7 December 2002 13	Lazio	3–3	Inter	Rome
20:45 CET (UTC+01:00)	C. López 10' (pen.), 30', 36'; Simeone (yellow card) 26'; Stankovic (yellow card) 25'; Corradi (yellow card) 76'; Liverani (yellow card) 92'	Report	31' Okan; 37' (o.g.) Couto; 66', 75' Belözoğlu; (yellow card) 74' Cordoba; (yellow card) 58' Vieri	Stadium: Olimpico; Attendance: 60,789; Referee: Roberto Rosetti

15 December 2002 14	Internazionale	1–0	Atalanta	Milan
15:00 CET (UTC+01:00)	Kallon 70'; Di Biagio (yellow card); Crespo (yellow card) 93'	Report	(yellow card) Foglio	Stadium: Giuseppe Meazza; Attendance: 57,118; Referee: Paolo Bertini

22 December 2002 15	Parma	1–2	Internazionale	Parma
20:30 CET (UTC+01:00)	J. Zanetti 55' (o.g.); E. Filippini (yellow card)	Report	Di Biagio 37'; Recoba 75' (pen.); (yellow card) 47' Pasquale	Stadium: Il Tardini; Attendance: 21,133; Referee: Pierluigi Collina

12 January 2003 16	Internazionale	2–0	Modena	Milan
20:30 CET (UTC+01:00)	Recoba 6'; Crespo 22'; Crespo 31'; Morfeo (yellow card) 44'; Kallon (yellow card); Conceicao 76'	Report	(yellow card) 86' Milanetto; (yellow card) 26' Colucci	Stadium: Giuseppe Meazza; Attendance: 57,610; Referee: Marco Gabriele

19 January 2003 17	Perugia	4–1	Internazionale	Perugia
15:00 CET (UTC+01:00)	Zé Maria 9' (pen.); Vryzas 34', 63'; Fusani 55'; (yellow card) Kalac; (yellow card) 39' Sogliano; (yellow card) 25' Blasi; (yellow card) 53' Grosso; (yellow card) Caracciolo	Report	46' Coco; (red card) 71' Di Biagio; 79' (pen.) Vieri; (yellow card) 10' Cordoba	Stadium: Stadio Renato Curi; Attendance: 22,020; Referee: Paolo Bertini

26 January 2003 18	Inter	3–0	Empoli	Milan
15:00 CET (UTC+01:00)	Almeyda 19'; Vieri 69', 73', 85'	Report	(yellow card) 18' Pratali	Stadium: Giuseppe Meazza; Attendance: 59,563; Referee: Pasquale Rodomonti

2 February 2003 19	Torino	0–2	Inter	Turin
20:30 CET (UTC+01:00)	Delli Carri (yellow card) 55'; Conticchio (yellow card) 15'	Report	Vieri 50'; Okan 56'; Emre (yellow card) 13'	Stadium: Stadio Olimpico Grande Torino; Attendance: 19,254; Referee: Salvatore Racalbuto

9 February 2003 20	Internazionale	3–0	Reggina	Milan
15:00 CET (UTC+01:00)	Vieri 10' 29'; Kallon 39', 43' (pen.); Emre 67'; Zanetti J. (yellow card) 62'; Cordoba (yellow card) 38'	Report	(yellow card) 48' Bonazzoli	Stadium: Giuseppe Meazza; Attendance: 64,319; Referee: Massimo De Santis

15 February 2003 21	Chievo	2–1	Inter	Verona
18:00 CET (UTC+01:00)	Corini 22' (pen.), 36' (pen.) (yellow card) 94' (yellow-red card); Lupatelli (yellow card) 71'	Report	(red card) 34' Okan; 69' Vieri; (yellow card) 19' Cannavaro; (yellow card) 48' Di Biagio; (yellow card) 72' Recoba	Stadium: Stadio Marc'Antonio Bentegodi; Attendance: 34,464; Referee: Salvatore Racalbuto

23 February 2003 22	Inter	3–1	Piacenza	Milan
15:00 CET (UTC+01:00)	Batistuta 64'; Vieri 65', 67'; Gamarra (yellow card) 71'; Morfeo (yellow card); Kallon (penalty missed) 81'	Report	90' Hübner; (yellow card) Cristante; (yellow card) 69' Mangone	Stadium: Giuseppe Meazza; Attendance: 56,352; Referee: Marco Gabriele

2 March 2003 23	Juventus	3–0	Inter	Turin
20:30 CET (UTC+01:00)	Guly 4' (o.g.); Nedvěd 34'; Camoranesi 83' (yellow card) 85'	Report	(yellow card) 64'Cannavaro; (yellow card) 71' Zanetti C.	Stadium: Delle Alpi; Attendance: 57,393; Referee: Gianluca Paparesta

8 March 2003 24	Bologna	1–2	Inter	Bologna
18:00 CET (UTC+01:00)	Nervo (red card) 19'; Cruz 24'; Vanoli (yellow card) 24'	Report	6' Materazzi; Recoba 9', 85'; (yellow card) 52' Cannavaro; (yellow card) 25' Cordoba; (yellow card) 4' Di Biagio; (yellow card) 36' Emre	Stadium: Stadio Renato Dall'Ara; Attendance: 31,433; Referee: Emilio Pellegrino

16 March 2003 25	Inter	4–0	Como	Milan
15:00 CET (UTC+01:00)	Batistuta 14'; Di Biagio 25'; Vieri (penalty missed) 31'; Vieri 56', 76'; Zanetti C. (yellow card) 17'	Report	(penalty missed) 27' Amoruso; (yellow card) 41' Cauet	Stadium: Giuseppe Meazza; Attendance: 61,967; Referee: Massimo De Santis
Note: Toldo blocked a penalty shoot-out by Amoruso at 27'.

23 March 2003 26	Udinese	2–1	Inter	Udine
20:30 CET (UTC+01:00)	Muzzi 48'; Iaquinta 59'	Report	73' Córdoba; (yellow card) 45' Coco; (yellow card) 63' C. Zanetti	Stadium: Stadio Friuli; Attendance: 22,919; Referee: Gianluca Paparesta

6 April 2003 27	Inter	3–3	Roma	Milan
20:30 CET (UTC+01:00)	Vieri 52'; Recoba 59'; Belözoğlu 77'	Report	46' Cassano; 82' (o.g.) Di Biagio; 84' Montella; (yellow card) Totti	Stadium: Giuseppe Meazza; Attendance: 64,142; Referee: Pierluigi Collina

12 April 2003 28	Inter	0–1	Milan	Milan
20:30 CET (UTC+01:00)	Córdoba (red card) 66'; Toldo (yellow card) 94'; Materazzi (yellow card) 40'; Di Biagio (yellow card) 28'	Report	62' Inzaghi; (yellow card) 77' Simic; (yellow card) 90' Gattuso; (yellow card) 84' Rui Costa	Stadium: Giuseppe Meazza; Attendance: 76,660; Referee: Roberto Rosetti

19 April 2003 29	Brescia	0–1	Inter	Brescia
15:00 CET (UTC+01:00)	Pisano (yellow card) 38'; Bilica (red card) 63'; Appiah (yellow card) 70'; Šerić (yellow card) 78'	Report	(yellow card) 33' (yellow-red card) C. Zanetti; 46' Batistuta; (red card) 63' Vieri; 93' Crespo	Stadium: Mario Rigamonti; Attendance: 22,039; Referee: Stefano Farina

27 April 2003 30	Inter	1–1	Lazio	Milan
20:30 CET (UTC+01:00)	Crespo 43'; Cordoba (yellow card) 93'; Conceicao (yellow card) 76'; Di Biagio (yellow card) 23'	Report	77'S. Inzaghi	Stadium: Giuseppe Meazza; Attendance: 58,430; Referee: Pierluigi Collina

3 May 2003 31	Atalanta	1–1	Inter	Bergamo
15:00 CET (UTC+01:00)	Gautieri 71'; Doni (yellow card) 75'; Rossini (yellow card) 58'; Foglio (yellow card) 29'	Report	13' Martins; (yellow card) 31' Conceicao	Stadium: Stadio Atleti Azzurri d'Italia; Attendance: 30,000; Referee: Daniele Tombolini

10 May 2003 32	Inter	1–1	Parma	Milan
15:00 CET (UTC+01:00)	Kallon 36'; Cordoba (yellow card) 12'; Gamarra (yellow card) 25'; Zanetti C. (yellow card) 27'; Conceicao 70'	Report	63' Mutu; (yellow card) 68' Bonera; (yellow card) P. Cannavaro; (yellow card) 64' E. Filippini	Stadium: Giuseppe Meazza; Attendance: 56,404; Referee: Nicola Ayroldi

17 May 2003 33	Modena	0–2	Inter	Modena
15:00 CET (UTC+01:00)	Mayer (yellow card)	Report	28' (o.g.) Pavan; 36' Kallon; (yellow card) Pasquale; (yellow card) Dalmat	Stadium: Alberto Braglia; Attendance: 14,124; Referee: Fiorenzo Treossi

24 May 2003 34	Inter	2–2	Perugia	Milan
15:00 CET (UTC+01:00)	Crespo 10', 56'	Report	46' Obodo; 89' (yellow card) Di Loreto; (yellow card) Sogliano	Stadium: Giuseppe Meazza; Attendance: 54,825; Referee: Alfredo Trentalange

=== Coppa Italia ===
==== Round of 16 ====
4 December 2002 1	Bari	1–0	Internazionale	Bari
21:00 CET (UTC+01:00)	D'Agostino 25'	Report		Stadium: Stadio San Nicola; Referee: Marco Gabriele

19 December 2002 2	Internazionale	1–2 (3–1 agg.)	Bari	Milan
21:00 CET (UTC+01:00)	Kallon 22'; Conceição 57'	Report	Gamarra 59' (o.g.); Spinesi 94'	Stadium: Giuseppe Meazza; Referee: Daniele Tombolini

=== UEFA Champions League ===
==== Qualifying phase ====
===== Third qualifying round =====
14 August 2002 First leg	Sporting CP (Portugal)	0–0	(Italy) Internazionale	Lisbon, Portugal
22:00		Report	Morfeo (yellow card) 44'; Materazzi (yellow card) 62'; Kallon 67'	Stadium: Estádio José Alvalade; Attendance: 25,421; Referee: (Norway) Rune Pedersen

27 August 2002 Second leg	Internazionale (Italy)	2–0	(Portugal) Sporting CP	Milan, Italy
21:00	Di Biagio 31'; Recoba 44'; Guly 60'	Report	Barbosa (yellow card) 39'; Rui Jorge (yellow card) 68'	Stadium: Giuseppe Meazza; Attendance: 51,405; Referee: (Netherlands) René Temmink

==== First group stage ====
Pos	Team	Pld	W	D	L	GF	GA	GD	Pts	Qualification	INT	AJX	LYO	ROS
1	(Italy) Internazionale	6	3	2	1	12	8	+4	11	Advance to second group stage	—	1–0	1–2	3–0
2	(Netherlands) Ajax	6	2	2	2	6	5	+1	8	Advance to second group stage	1–2	—	2–1	1–1
3	(France) Lyon	6	2	2	2	12	9	+3	8	Transfer to UEFA Cup	3–3	0–2	—	5–0
4	(Norway) Rosenborg	6	0	4	2	4	12	−8	4		2–2	0–0	1–1	—

Source: RSSSF

17 September 2002 1	Rosenborg (Norway)	2–2	(Italy) Inter	Trondheim, Norway
20:45 (CET)	Berg (yellow card) 32'; Karadas 52', 65'	Report	Crespo 33', 79'; Cannavaro (yellow card) 64' (yellow-red card) 69'	Stadium: Lerkendal Stadion; Attendance: 21,040; Referee: (Spain) Juan Fernández Marin

25 September 2002 2	Inter (Italy)	1–0	(Netherlands) Ajax	Milan
20:45 (CET)	Emre 55'; Crespo 75'	Report	23' Stekelenburg; (yellow card) 50' van der Meyde	Stadium: Giuseppe Meazza; Attendance: 45,784; Referee: (Scotland) Stuart Dougal

2 October 2002 3	Inter (Italy)	1–2	(France) Lyon	Milan
20:45 (CET)	Córdoba (yellow card) 40'; Caçapa 73' (o.g.); Cannavaro (yellow card) 87'; Morfeo (yellow card) 90+1'	Report	Govou 21' (yellow card) 64'; Anderson 60'	Stadium: Giuseppe Meazza; Attendance: 31,448; Referee: (Spain) Manuel Mejuto González

22 October 2002 4	Lyon (France)	3–3	(Italy) Inter	Lyon, France
20:45 (CET)	Anderson 21', 75'; Carrière 44'; Diarra (yellow card) 53'; Caçapa (yellow card) 63'	Report	24' Di Biagio; (yellow card) 27' Morfeo; 31' (o.g.) Caçapa; (yellow card) 33' Córdoba; 56' Crespo; 66' Crespo	Stadium: Stade de Gerland; Attendance: 37,770; Referee: (Denmark) Kim Milton Nielsen

30 October 2002 5	Inter (Italy)	3–0	(Norway) Rosenborg	Milan
20:45 (CET)	Recoba 31'; Cannavaro (yellow card) 48'; Saarinen 52' (o.g.); Crespo 72'	Report		Stadium: Giuseppe Meazza; Attendance: 36,000; Referee: (Belgium) Frank De Bleeckere

12 November 2002 6	Ajax (Netherlands)	1–2	(Italy) Inter	Amsterdam
20:45 (CET)	Mido (yellow card) 76'; Van der Vaart 90+4'	Report	(yellow card) 26' Materazzi; (yellow card) 31' Coco; (yellow card) 41' Vieri; 50', 52' Crespo; (yellow card) 79' Toldo; (yellow card) 80' Almeyda	Stadium: Amsterdam Arena; Attendance: 50,272; Referee: (Switzerland) Urs Meier

==== Second group stage ====
Pos	Team	Pld	W	D	L	GF	GA	GD	Pts	Qualification	BAR	INT	NEW	LEV
1	(Spain) Barcelona	6	5	1	0	12	2	+10	16	Advance to knockout stage	—	3–0	3–1	2–0
2	(Italy) Internazionale	6	3	2	1	11	8	+3	11	Advance to knockout stage	0–0	—	2–2	3–2
3	(England) Newcastle United	6	2	1	3	10	13	−3	7		0–2	1–4	—	3–1
4	(Germany) Bayer Leverkusen	6	0	0	6	5	15	−10	0		1–2	0–2	1–3	—

Source: RSSSF

27 November 2002 1	Newcastle United (England)	1–4	(Italy) Inter	Newcastle, England
20:45 (CET)	Bellamy (red card) 5'; Solano 72'	Report	2' Morfeo; (yellow card) 10' Cannavaro; 15' Materazzi; (yellow card) 26' Zanetti; 35'Almeyda; 45+1' (yellow card) 64' Crespo; (yellow card) 78' Vieri; 81' Recoba	Stadium: St. James' Park; Attendance: 50,108; Referee: (France) Stéphane Bré

10 December 2002 2	Inter (Italy)	3–2	(Germany) Bayer Leverkusen	Milan
20:45 (CET)	Di Biagio 15', 27'; Vieri 74'; Butt 80' (o.g.)	Report	(yellow card) 29' Placente; 63'Živković; 90+1'França; (yellow card) 90+2'Schneider	Stadium: Giuseppe Meazza; Attendance: 36,462; Referee: (Scotland) Hugh Dallas

18 February 2003 3	Barcelona (Spain)	3–0	(Italy) Inter	Barcelona, Spain
20:45 (CET)	Saviola 7'; Cocu 29'; Kluivert 67'	Report	(yellow card) 64' Córdoba; (yellow card) 69' C. Zanetti; (red card) 80' Recoba	Stadium: Camp Nou; Attendance: 80,000; Referee: (Sweden) Anders Frisk

26 February 2003 4	Inter (Italy)	0–0	(Spain) Barcelona	Milan, Italy
20:45 (CET)	Morfeo (yellow card) 20'; Kallon 34'; Cannavaro (yellow card) 58'; Dalmat 61'	Report	(yellow card) 10' Puyol; (yellow card) 56' Cocu; (yellow card) 95' Gabri	Stadium: Giuseppe Meazza; Attendance: 71,740; Referee: (Switzerland) Urs Meier

11 March 2003 5	Inter (Italy)	2–2	(England) Newcastle United	Milan, Italy
20:45 (CET)	Conceição (yellow card) 31'; Vieri 47' (yellow card) 63'; Córdoba 61'; Di Biagio (yellow card) 90+2'	Report	(yellow card) 33' Bramble; 42', 49' (yellow card) 90+5' Shearer; (yellow card) 64' Bellamy; (yellow card) 90+3' LuaLua	Stadium: Giuseppe Meazza; Attendance: 58,000; Referee: (Portugal) Lucílio Batista

19 March 2003 6	Bayer Leverkusen (Germany)	0–2	(Italy) Inter	Leverkusen, Germany
20:45 (CET)	Ojigwe (yellow card) 22'; Kleine (yellow card) 44'; Cris (yellow card) 85'	Report	19' Okan; 36' (yellow card) 75' Martins; (penalty missed) 43' Morfeo; 90' Belözoğlu	Stadium: BayArena; Attendance: 22,500; Referee: (Russia) Valentin Ivanov

==== Knockout phase ====
===== Quarter-finals =====
9 April 2003 First leg	Inter (Italy)	1–0	(Spain) Valencia	Milan
20:45 (CET)	Vieri 14'; Coco 31'; Emre (red card) 57'; Zanetti (yellow card) 71'; Pasquale (yellow card) 93'	Report	(yellow card) 43' Rufete; (red card) 57' Albelda; (yellow card) 90+4' Aimar	Stadium: Giuseppe Meazza; Attendance: 52,623; Referee: (West Germany) Markus Merk

22 April 2003 Second leg	Valencia (Spain)	2–1 (2–2a agg.)	(Italy) Inter	Valencia
20:45 (CET)	Aimar 7'; Baraja (yellow card) 32' (goal) 51'; Angulo (yellow card) 38'; Marchena (yellow card) 81'	Report	5' (yellow card) 14' Vieri; (yellow card) 26' Pasquale; (yellow card) 38' Toldo; 31' Vieri; (yellow card) 65' Di Biagio; (yellow card) 78' Zanetti	Stadium: Estadio Mestalla; Attendance: 48,000; Referee: (Denmark) Kim Milton Nielsen

===== Semi-finals =====
7 May 2003 First leg	Milan (Italy)	0–0	(Italy) Internazionale	Milan
20:45 (CET)		Report	84' Coco	Stadium: San Siro; Attendance: 78,175; Referee: (Russia) Valentin Ivanov

13 May 2003 Second leg	Internazionale (Italy)	1–1 (1–1a agg.)	(Italy) Milan	Milan
20:45 (CET)	Di Biagio (yellow card) 39'; Martins 84'	Report	Gattuso (yellow card) 37'; Inzaghi (yellow card) 37'; Rui Costa (yellow card) 40'; Shevchenko 45+1'; Kaladze (yellow card) 85'	Stadium: Giuseppe Meazza; Attendance: 76,854; Referee: (France) Gilles Veissière

== Statistics ==
=== Appearances and goals ===
As of 31 June 2003

No.	Pos	Nat	Player	Total		Serie A		Coppa Italia		Champions League	
No.	Pos	Nat	Player	Apps	Goals	Apps	Goals	Apps	Goals	Apps	Goals
1	GK	(Italy) ITA	Toldo	51	0	32	0	1	0	18	0
4	DF	(Argentina) ARG	Zanetti J	53	1	32+2	1	1	0	18	0
13	DF	(Italy) ITA	Cannavaro	40	0	27+1	0	0	0	10+2	0
23	DF	(Italy) ITA	Materazzi	33	1	18+2	1	0	0	13	0
2	DF	(Colombia) COL	Cordoba	43	2	27+1	1	1	0	14	1
77	DF	(Italy) ITA	Coco	33	0	16+4	0	0	0	12+1	0
7	MF	(Portugal) POR	Conçeicão	33	1	14+5	0	1	1	9+4	0
14	MF	(Italy) ITA	Di Biagio	41	7	21+4	4	0	0	15+1	3
5	MF	(Turkey) TUR	Emre	37	5	22+3	4	0	0	10+2	1
32	FW	(Italy) ITA	Vieri	37	27	22+1	24	0	0	14	3
20	FW	(Uruguay) URU	Recoba	41	12	23+4	9	0+1	0	7+6	3
12	GK	(Italy) ITA	Fontana	3	0	2	0	1	0	0	0
9	FW	(Argentina) ARG	Crespo	30	16	14+4	7	0	0	12	9
6	MF	(Italy) ITA	Zanetti C	24	0	14+3	0	1	0	5+1	0
26	DF	(Italy) ITA	Pasquale	30	0	13+5	0	1	0	5+6	0
25	MF	(Argentina) ARG	Almeyda	26	1	13+3	0	0	0	5+5	1
10	MF	(Italy) ITA	Morfeo	27	2	11+6	1	0	0	9+1	1
19	FW	(Argentina) ARG	Batistuta	12	2	10+2	2	0	0	0	0
18	MF	(France) FRA	Dalmat	23	0	9+6	0	0	0	8	0
22	MF	(Turkey) TUR	Okan	22	2	9+6	2	0	0	4+3	0
24	DF	(Paraguay) PAR	Gamarra	23	0	7+7	0	2	0	4+3	0
3	FW	(Sierra Leone) SLE	Kallon	15	4	4+5	4	2	0	2+2	0
31	DF	(Argentina) ARG	Vivas	6	0	4+2	0	0	0	0	0
11	MF	(Argentina) ARG	Guly	16	0	3+4	0	2	0	3+4	0
30	FW	(Nigeria) NGA	Martins	11	3	3+1	1	2	0	1+4	2
15	DF	(Italy) ITA	Adani	11	1	2+5	1	0	0	0+4	0
40	DF	(Italy) ITA	Franchini	2	0	0+1	0	1	0	0	0
43	DF	(Italy) ITA	Potenza	1	0	0	0	1	0	0	0
21	MF	(Italy) ITA	Beati	5	0	0+2	0	1+1	0	0+1	0
41	MF	(Italy) ITA	Napolitano	4	0	1+1	0	0+2	0	0	0
44	MF	(Italy) ITA	Rebecchi	1	0	0	0	1	0	0	0
45	MF	(Brazil) BRA	Wellington	1	0	0	0	1	0	0	0
34	FW	(Italy) ITA	Altobelli	1	0	0	0	0+1	0	0	0
16	DF	(Uruguay) URU	Sorondo	0	0	0	0				
65	GK	(Italy) ITA	Rossi	0	0	0	0				
27	GK	(France) FRA	Moreau	0	0	0	0				
78	FW	(Italy) ITA	Ventola								
19	FW	(Italy) ITA	Corradi	1	0	0	0	0	0	0+1	0
8	MF	(Spain) ESP	Farinos	4	0	1+1	0	2	0	0	0

- Source: http://calcio-seriea.net/partite/2002/1219/
