= Guly =

Guly is a given name and a nickname. Notable people with the name include:

- Andrés Guglielminpietro (born 1974, nicknamed Guly), Argentinian footballer and manager
- Guly do Prado (born 1981), Brazilian footballer
