= Simone Villanova =

Italian footballer

Personal information
- Date of birth: 22 November 1984 (age 41)
- Place of birth: Valdobbiadene, Italy
- Height: 1.85 m (6 ft 1 in)
- Position: Goalkeeper

Youth career
- Cittadella
- 2003–2004: → Internazionale (loan)

Senior career*
Years	Team	Apps	(Gls)
2004–2011	Cittadella	58	(0)
2004–2006	→ Bassano (loan)	62	(0)
- * Club domestic league appearances and goals

Simone Villanova (born 22 November 1984) is an Italian footballer who plays as a goalkeeper. He played in Serie B for Cittadella.

== Career ==
Born in Valdobbiadene, Veneto, Villanova started his career at Veneto club Cittadella. In 2003–04 season, he was loaned to Internazionale, ahead Nathan Coe, Alex Cordaz (promoted to first team) and Giacomo Bindi (promoted from Allievi Nazionali U-17 team) as first choice goalkeeper of Primavera Team (U20 Youth Team).

In summer 2004, he left for Bassano Virtus of Serie D, helped the non-professional side promoted to Serie C2. In the next season, Villanova played 31 matches for the newcomer and survived from relegation.

He then returned to Cittadella and played as Andrea Pierobon's backup. In 2009–10 season, he became the first choice goalkeeper. Despite played 32 out of possible 42 Serie B in 2010–11 Serie B. He left the club as free agent in 2011.
