= Pierobon =

Pierobon is an Italian surname. Notable people with the surname include:

- Andrea Pierobon (born 1969), Italian footballer and coach
- Chiara Pierobon (1993–2015), Italian cyclist
- Gianluca Pierobon (born 1967), Italian cyclist
