= Isah Eliakwu =

Nigerian footballer (born 1985)

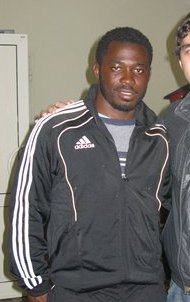

Personal information
- Full name: Isah Abdulahi Eliakwu
- Date of birth: 25 October 1985 (age 41)
- Place of birth: Lokoja, Nigeria
- Height: 1.72 m (5 ft 8 in)
- Position: Forward

Youth career
- Reggiana
- 2002–2003: → Inter Milan (loan)

Senior career*
Years	Team	Apps	(Gls)
2003–2008	Inter Milan	0	(0)
2004	→ Parma (loan)	0	(0)
2004–2005	→ Ascoli (loan)	24	(0)
2005–2006	→ Triestina (loan)	16	(8)
2006–2008	Triestina (co-ownership)	35	(3)
2007–2008	→ Spezia (loan)	29	(7)
2008–2009	Triestina	5	(0)
2009	Gallipoli	4	(0)
2010	Varese	4	(0)
2010–2012	Anzhi Makhachkala	3	(0)
Total		120	(18)
- * Club domestic league appearances and goals

Isah Abdulahi Eliakwu (born 25 October 1985) is a Nigerian former footballer who played as a forward.

== Career ==
=== Early career ===
After the abolition of the non-EU quota per team in 2000–01 season, Eliakwu joined Reggiana, where he played along with countrymen Stephen Makinwa, Akande Ajide, Adewale Wahab, Obafemi Martins and Saidi Adeshokan. At that time FIFA had not yet restricted youth player's international transfers.

In June 2002, he was signed by AS Roma, but in pure financial tricks to raise profit, which the net asset of the club was just increased in terms of player contract value. Eliakwu and Akande Ajide were exchanged with Daniele De Vezze and Fabio Tinazzi in co-ownership deal, all 4 were valued €2 million thus the 50% registration rights "worth" €1 million each. Tinazzi and De Vezze created false profit of €2 million and €1.93 million for Roma alone.

About August 2002, Eliakwu was sold back to Reggiana for free, as well as Ajide was signed outright for Roma for another €1 million.

=== Inter Milan and loans ===
On 31 August 2002, age 16, Eliakwu left for Inter Milan in temporary deal where Inter had already signed Obafemi Martins and Saidi Adeshokan the previous year.

At Primavera, he was the 4th goalscorer (4 goals) of the league group stage, 7 goals behind team top-scorer Martins. He played at the League Playoffs final that lost to Lecce. In July 2003 Eliakwu was signed in co-ownership deal for €750,000.

In 2003–04 season, after Martins was promoted to first team, Eliakwu was the Primavera team topscorer with 38 goals (18+3 in league, 11 in cup & 6 in Viareggio), ahead Riccardo Meggiorini and Federico Piovaccari. Primavera lost to Lecce Primavera Team in the League playoffs final.

He occasionally received a first team call-up in 2003–04 season, and made his debut on 13 January 2004, a goalless draw with Udinese at 2003–04 Coppa Italia.

On 21 January 2004, age 18, he was involved in Adriano's transfer, in which he would leave for Parma on loan. But on 31 January 2004, he returned to Inter Primavera Team from Parma.

After playing a pre-season friendly, in August 2004, he left on loan to Serie B side Ascoli along with Luca Franchini, where he played 24 league matches. Under the shadow of team top-scorer Cristian Bucchi and Roberto Colacone, he failed to score a goal.

=== Triestina ===
In August 2005, he was loaned to another Serie B side Triestina The first part of the season saw little of Isah due to recurring injuries, but this changed in the second half of the season. The sale of Triestina's leading scorer Denis Godeas to Palermo was followed by injuries to the remaining strikers at the club giving Eliakwu the opportunity to play regularly for the first team until the end of the season. In the final 16 games Isah scored 8 goals, endearing himself to the fans and receiving the fan's player of the season award.

The summer of 2006 saw Stefano Fantinel confirmed as the new chairman of Triestina, and Eliakwu was acquired in a co-ownership deal, for €450,000 (i.e. Both club own 50% rights), In 2006–07 season, he played 19 starts in 40 appearances, and scored 6 goals, 1 goal behind team top-scorer Riccardo Allegretti. Triestina almost relegated that season after failing to score (ranked 4th least goal in Serie B). In the first half of the season, along with Francesco Ruopolo, Eliakwu played as 4th striker, and Eliakwu had to compete with former Inter teammate Federico Piovaccari to be the third striker in a formation which used 3 front men, to partner with Mattia Graffiedi and Emiliano Testini. He did not feature in Triestina's 2 strikers formation. After the arrival of Luigi Della Rocca in mid-season, Piovaccari and Eliakwu were once became 4th choice strikers, but soon after the arrival of the new coach Franco Varrella and injuries to Della Rocca and Graffiedi, Eliakwu regained his regular place to rotate with Piovaccari as Testini's partner in 2 strikers formation.

In June 2007, the co-ownership deal with Inter was renewed and in July 2007 he left for Serie B strugglers Spezia, which was Inter's feeder club from 2003 to 2005. At Spezia, he joined with two other Inter-owned players Luca Ceccarelli and Sebastián Ribas. During the first half of the season he was often substituted for Corrado Colombo and Massimiliano Guidetti. Coach Antonio Soda even preferred a 4–5–1 formation when Colombo was not available instead of letting Eliakwu play. After of Colombo left, Eliakwu played more regularly and scored 7 goals. He played 29 league matches in 2007–08 season, started 14 games, all in the second half of season.

In June 2008, Triestina got full registration rights from Inter, for a peppercorn fee of €1,000, but due to injuries and the fact that Triestina had 6 strikers, he just played 5 league matches.

=== Gallipoli and Varese ===
In June 2009 he was released by Triestina. After a short trial with Hajduk Split (without official appearance), in August 2009 he signed a 1-year contract with newly promoted Serie B outfit Gallipoli, as the club solved their financial problems. He was the 4th choice striker behind Ciro Ginestra, Francesco Di Gennaro and Samuel Di Carmine and played just 4 league matches before leaving for Varese of Lega Pro Prima Divisione in January 2010 on free transfer. He made his first-team debut on 13 January 2010, substituted for Matteo Momentè in the 66th minutes. in the next two matches, Eliakwu was chosen ahead of Momentè as starting striker to partner with Pietro Tripoli and Stefano Del Sante but after the recovery of Osariemen Ebagua and signing of Neto, Eliakwu and Del Sante were dropped from starting line-up. He started in the first leg of 2009–10 Coppa Italia Lega Pro semi-final, partnered with former Inter teammate Momentè in the starting eleven. Varese promoted as the play-offs winner, but Eliakwu was not included in the club's Serie B plan.

=== Anzhi Makhachkala ===
In September 2010 Eliakwu signed for Russian side Anzhi Makhachkala.

=== SKA-Energiya ===
On 6 September 2012, the last day of the transfer window, SKA-Energiya announced that Eliakwu had joined the club. In October of the same year SKA-Energiya announced that they had not signed a contract with Eliakwu and he would leave the club.

== Career statistics ==
Appearances and goals by club, season and competition
Club	Season	League			Cup		Continental		Other		Total	
Club	Season	Division	Apps	Goals	Apps	Goals	Apps	Goals	Apps	Goals	Apps	Goals
Inter Milan	2003–04	Serie A	0	0	1	0	0	0	—		1	0
Parma (loan)	2003–04	Serie A	0	0	0	0	0	0	—		0	0
Ascoli (loan)	2004–05	Serie B	24	0	1	0	—		—		25	0
Triestina (loan)	2005–06	Serie B	16	8	0	0	—		—		16	8
Triestina (co-ownership)	2006–07	Serie B	35	3	5	3	—		—		40	6
Spezia (loan)	2007–08	Serie B	29	7	0	0	—		—		29	7
Triestina	2008–09	Serie B	5	0	2	1	—		—		7	1
Gallipoli	2009–10	Serie B	4	0	0	0	—		—		4	0
Varese	2009–10	Lega Pro Prima Divisione	4	0	0	0	—		—		4	0
Anzhi Makhachkala	2010	Russian Premier League	0	0	0	0	—		—		0	0
Anzhi Makhachkala	2011–12	Russian Premier League	3	0	1	0	—		—		4	0
Anzhi Makhachkala	Total		3	0	1	0	—		—		4	0
Career total			120	18	10	4	0	0	0	0	130	22
