= Giacomo Bindi =

Italian footballer

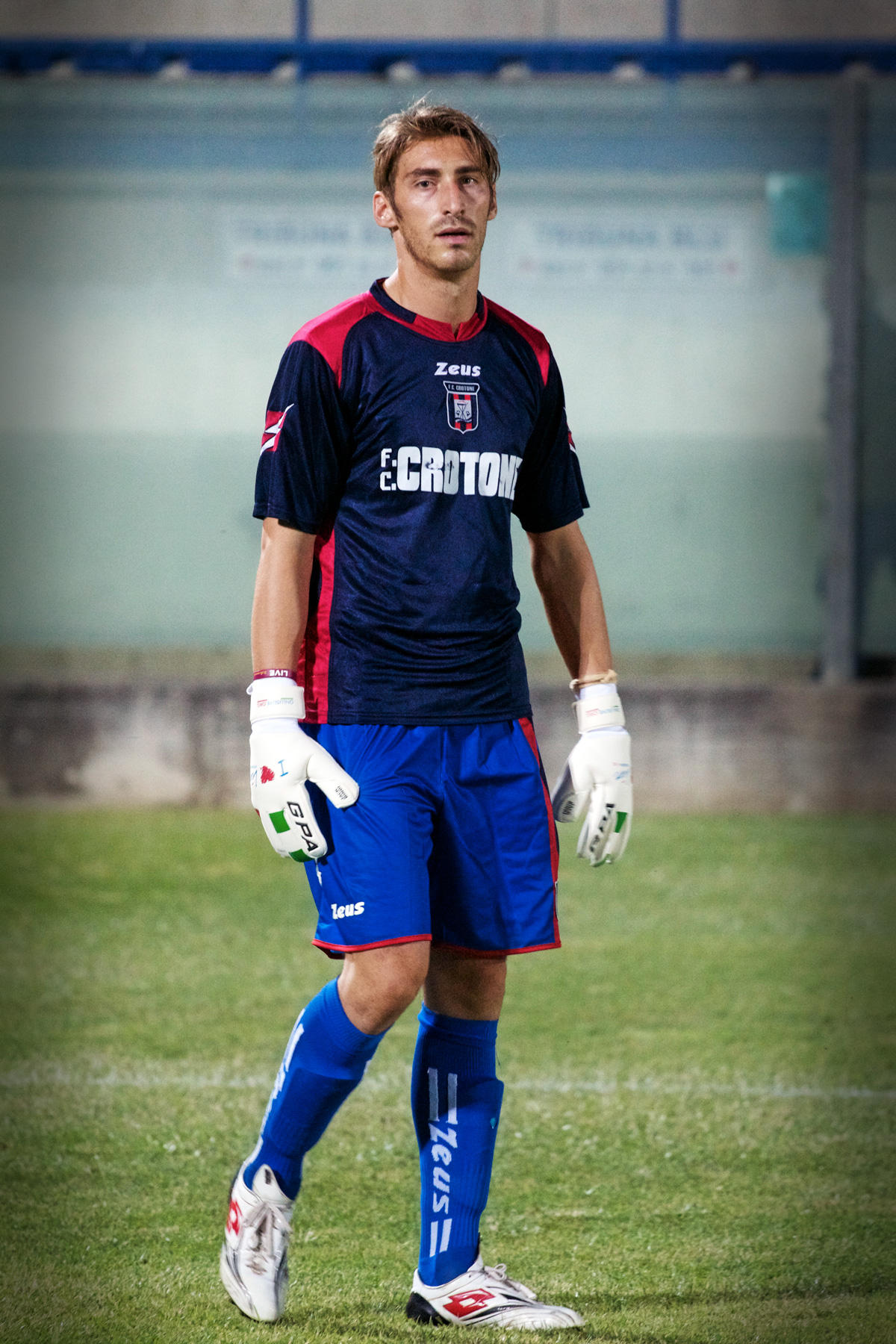

Personal information
- Date of birth: 2 January 1987 (age 39)
- Place of birth: Siena, Italy
- Height: 1.89 m (6 ft 2 in)
- Position: Goalkeeper

Youth career
- Arezzo
- 2003–2006: Internazionale

Senior career*
Years	Team	Apps	(Gls)
2002–2003	Arezzo	1	(0)
2006–2010	Internazionale	0	(0)
2006–2007	→ Varese (loan)	32	(0)
2007–2008	→ Sambenedettese (loan)	2	(0)
2008	→ Manfredonia (loan)	2	(0)
2008–2009	→ Monza (loan)	2	(0)
2009	→ Pistoiese (loan)	12	(0)
2009–2010	→ Foggia (loan)	17	(0)
2010–2012	Crotone	24	(0)
2012–2013	Latina	28	(0)
2013–2015	Catanzaro	58	(0)
2015	Siena	1	(0)
2016	Pisa	16	(0)
2016–2018	Padova	72	(0)
2018–2022	Pordenone	52	(0)

International career
2003	Italy U16	3	(0)
2003	Italy U17	0	(0)
2004	Italy U18	1	(0)
2005	Italy U19	0	(0)
2005–2007	Italy U20	3	(0)
- * Club domestic league appearances and goals

Giacomo Bindi (born 2 January 1987) is an Italian former footballer who played as a goalkeeper.

== Club career ==
=== Early career ===
Born in Siena, Tuscany, Bindi started his career at Arezzo the nearby province. In summer 2003, he joined Internazionale's Allievi Nazionali Team in a temporary deal, which he also played once for Primavera Team, behind Simone Villanova and Alex Cordaz (who already promoted to the 1st team) as the 3rd goalkeeper along with Nathan Coe (who also plays at Berretti Team). In June 2004, he was bought permanently, signed a youth contract and promoted to Primavera Team. Bindi also call-up to first team in 2003–04 season and played once in club friendly. In 2004–05 season he was the 4th choice goalkeeper of the first team (which usually the Primavera team first choice), behind Francesco Toldo, Alberto Fontana and Fabián Carini, ahead Cordaz and Moreno Impagnatiello, which Bindi played in a few friendlies. In the next season, Bindi remained as the 4th keeper and also played in pre-season friendlies.

=== Inter & loans ===
In July 2006, he was graduated from Primavera U20 Team and loaned to Serie C2 side Varese in July 2006, where he played as first choice. In the next season, he left for Serie C1 Group B side Sambenedettese where he played as Stefano Visi's backup. In the mid-season, he left for Manfredonia of Serie C1 Group A, where he played as Alberto Frison's backup, replacing Manolo Leacche. In 2008–09 season, he remained at the same level, for Monza, where he was the backup of Enrico Rossi Chauvenet, another Inter youth product. In the mid-season, he left for Lega Pro Prima Divisione Group B (ex–Serie C1) side Pistoiese on loan. Which he replaced Francesco Conti as first choice who left the club in mid-season and ahead Gianmatteo Mareggini, the 41-year-old ex-first choice. In 2009–10 season, he remained at L.P. Prime Division Group B for Foggia, ahead Damiano Milan as first choice.

=== Crotone ===
Bindi's contract with Inter was reported expired on 30 June 2010. On 30 August 2010, Bindi joined Genoa on a free transfer. He joined Serie B side Crotone in a co-ownership deal on the same day, for a peppercorn fee of €500. He was the third keeper of the team, behind Inter youth product Vid Belec and experienced Emanuele Concetti. Since January he was promoted to the second keeper and took the starting place during the 2011–12 Serie B. However, after losing to Bresica 0–3, Leonardo Menichini re-picked Belec as first choice against Livorno who also played in the first round-robin. Bindi temporary returned to starting line-up from week 28 to 31.

In June 2012 Genoa bought back Bindi, made Crotone had lost two goalkeepers after Vid Belec's loan also expired. Francesco De Luca became the only keeper for Crotone.

=== Latina ===
Bindi returned to Genoa in June 2012 but left for third division club Latina on 19 July 2012 for free.

=== Catanzaro ===
On 26 August 2013 he was signed by Catanzaro in a 2-year deal.

=== Siena ===
On 12 August 2015 he was signed by Lega Pro newcomer Siena in a two-year deal.

=== Pisa ===
In January 2016 Bindi was signed by Pisa on a free transfer. The club won promotion to Serie B as the winner of the playoffs.

== International career ==
=== Italy U16 & U17 ===
Bindi was capped for Italy U16 team in 2003. He was call-up to 2003 UEFA European Under-17 Football Championship as Fabio Virgili's backup. That season age limit in fact was born 1986 or after. He was not call-up to 2004 edition as the coach preferred Andrea Consigli and Danilo Russo. Bindi only received a call-up at the start of 2003–04 season.

=== Italy U18 & U19 ===
He played his single appearances for Italy U18 team (U19's feeder team) in October 2004.

He then call-up to 2006 UEFA European Under-19 Football Championship qualification, as Andrea Consigli's backup.

=== Italy U20 ===
After U19 team eliminated from official competition in late 2005, Bindi then call-up to U20 team by Claudio Gentile, for 2005–06 Four Nations Tournament (between Switzerland, Germany and Austria) 2nd match against Austria U20. Bindi was ahead Russo as 1st choice. (Consigli did not receive call-up), but as Consigli's backup against Germany U20 in December 2005 the 3rd match. He then call-up again in January 2006 (4th match), as 1st choice ahead Russo and Consigli. In the last match of the tournament, the coach preferred Daniele Padelli as 1st choice and Russo as backup and Italy U20 won the tournament.

Bindi also played another match for U18 team in unofficial match on 31 May 2006 as overage player, 3–1 won Juniores Best XI. The match was considered as the ending match of U-18 team (born 1988) that season and U-19 team (born 1987) against Serie D Best XI was on the next day. Both coached by U18 & U19 coach Paolo Berrettini; season of U-19 was in fact faced its early end in late 2005, made U-18 team had an early start to prepare for the 2006–07 season and U-19 (born 1987 team) became de facto U-20. However, that "U-18" team in that match in fact fielded with numbers of overage player, made it became the de facto B team of U-20, such as Inter teammate and goalscorers of that match Matteo Momentè and Domenico Germinale (both 1 goal).

Bindi remained in 2006–07 U-20 squad coached by Pierluigi Casiraghi which he played the opening match (as Consigli promoted to U21) of the Four Nations on 13 September. He was replaced by Padelli at half time. Bindi became Consigli's backup again on 1 October (2nd match) but then did not receive any call-up for the rest of the 2006–07 fixture. Bindi received his last call-up on 5 September 2007, from Massimo Piscedda, the opening match of 2007–08 season Four Nations, as Inter teammate Enrico Alfonso's backup. He played his last U-20 match on 31 May 2007, an unofficial friendly against Serie D Best XI, coached by Antonio Rocca.
