= 2001–02 FC Barcelona season =

103rd season in existence of FC Barcelona

Barcelona
2001–02 season
- President: Joan Gaspart
- Head Coach: Carles Rexach
- Stadium: Camp Nou
- La Liga: 4th
- Copa del Rey: First round
- UEFA Champions League: Semi-finals
- Top goalscorer: League: Patrick Kluivert (18); All: Patrick Kluivert (25)
- Average home league attendance: 54,211
Home colours	Away colours	Third colours

Barcelona's 2001–02 season was the second under the presidency of Joan Gaspart and the single full season of management by Carles Rexach (who had replaced Lorenzo Serra Ferrer in the latter part of the previous campaign).

The summer of 2001 saw long-serving team captain Josep Guardiola leave the club, while many transfer deals were concluded to give a new face to the squad with the signings of Roberto Bonano, Javier Saviola, Patrik Andersson, Francesco Coco, Geovanni, Philippe Christanval and Fábio Rochemback. This was also the final season at Barcelona of veteran players like Sergi Barjuán, Abelardo and the talismanic Rivaldo.

Barcelona had a mediocre campaign in La Liga, finishing in 4th place, 11 points below eventual champions Valencia; in Europe, on the other hand, they produced some very good performances, reaching the semi-finals of the UEFA Champions League, where they were eliminated by fierce rivals (and eventual winners) Real Madrid. Patrick Kluivert was the club's top scorer in all competitions, with 25 goals.

== Squad ==
Correct as of 3 October 2009. Note: Flags indicate national team as defined under FIFA eligibility rules; some limited exceptions apply. Players may hold more than one non-FIFA nationality.

No.	Pos.	Nation	Player
1	GK	ARG	Roberto Bonano
2	DF	NED	Michael Reiziger
3	DF	NED	Frank de Boer
4	DF	SWE	Patrik Andersson
5	DF	ESP	Abelardo
6	MF	ESP	Xavi
7	FW	ARG	Javier Saviola
8	MF	NED	Phillip Cocu
9	FW	NED	Patrick Kluivert
10	MF	BRA	Rivaldo
11	MF	NED	Marc Overmars
12	DF	ESP	Sergi (captain)
13	GK	ESP	Pepe Reina
14	MF	ESP	Gerard
15	MF	BRA	Fábio Rochemback
17	DF	FRA	Philippe Christanval

No.	Pos.	Nation	Player
18	MF	ESP	Gabri
19	FW	ESP	Dani García
20	FW	ESP	Alfonso
21	MF	ESP	Luis Enrique
22	MF	BRA	Geovanni
23	DF	ITA	Francesco Coco
24	DF	ESP	Carles Puyol
25	GK	FRA	Richard Dutruel
26	DF	ESP	Fernando Navarro
27	MF	ESP	Roberto Trashorras
28	MF	BRA	Thiago Motta
29	DF	ESP	Nano
30	DF	ESP	Oleguer
31	MF	ESP	Jofre
35	GK	ESP	Víctor Valdés
37	MF	ESP	Dani Tortolero

=== Transfers ===
==== In ====
No.	Pos.	Nat.	Name	Age	EU	Moving from	Type	Transfer window	Ends	Transfer fee	Source
15	MF	(Brazil)	Rochemback	19	Non-EU	Internacional (Brazil)	Transfer ✓	Summer	2005	€9M	
4	DF	(Sweden)	Andersson	29	EU	Bayern Munich (Germany)	Transfer ✓	Summer	2005	€8M	
7	FW	(Argentina)	Saviola	19	Non-EU	River Plate (Argentina)	Transfer ✓	Summer	2007	€35.9M	
22	FW	(Brazil)	Geovanni	21	Non-EU	Cruzeiro (Brazil)	Transfer ✓	Summer	2006	€21M	
17	DF	(France)	Christanval	22	EU	Monaco (France)	Transfer ✓	Summer	2005	€15M	
1	GK	(Argentina)	Bonano	31	EU	River Plate (Argentina)	Transfer ✓	Summer	2005	€1.2M	
23	DF	(Italy)	Coco	24	EU	Milan (Italy)	Loan →	Summer	2002	N/A	

Total spending: ▼€90.1 million

==== Out ====
No.	Pos.	Nat.	Name	Age	EU	Moving to	Type	Transfer window	Transfer fee	Source
4	MF	(Spain)	Guardiola	30	EU	Brescia (Italy)	Contract Termination ✗	Summer	Free	
15	FW	(Finland)	Litmanen	30	EU	Liverpool (England)	Contract Termination ✗	Summer	Free	
23	MF	(Netherlands)	Zenden	24	EU	Chelsea (England)	Transfer ✓	Summer	€8M	
20	MF	(Portugal)	Simão	21	EU	Benfica (Portugal)	Transfer ✓	Summer	€12M	
27	DF	(Spain)	Cuadrado	22	EU	Murcia	Transfer ✓	Summer	€0.2M	
17	MF	(France)	Petit	30	EU	Chelsea (England)	Transfer ✓	Summer	€7.5M	
20	FW	(Spain)	Alfonso	28	EU	Marseille (France)	Loan →	Winter	N/A	

Total income: ▲€31.7 million

Last updated: 3 October

== Competitions ==
=== Pre-season and friendlies ===
Win Draw Loss Fixtures

28 July 2001 Friendly	Chênois	0–3	Barcelona	Switzerland
		Report	Saviola 11', 14'; Kluivert 25'

29 July 2001 Friendly	Luzern	0–5	Barcelona	Lucerne, Switzerland
		Report	Kluivert 14', 43'; Cocu 50', 55'; Geovanni 75'	Stadium: Stadion Allmend; Attendance: c. 12,000; Referee: Carlo Bertolini (Switzerland)

31 July 2001 Friendly	Grasshopper	2–4	Barcelona	Switzerland
	Núñez 43'; Mwaruwari 59'	Report	Saviola 25', 69'; Geovanni 70'; Rochemback 72'	Referee: Nicole Pehgnat

3 August 2001 Friendly	Sporting	1–3	Barcelona	Geneva, Switzerland
	André Cruz 67'	Report	Luis Enrique 21'; Overmars 24'; Gerard 90+1'	Referee: Dieter Schhoch (Switzerland)

10 August 2001 Friendly	Derby County	0–3	Barcelona	England
		Report	Kluivert 4', 6'; Geovanni 15'	Referee: Dermot Gallagher (Ireland)

12 August 2001 Friendly	Blackburn Rovers	3–2	Barcelona	England
	Flitcroft 29'; Dunn 42'; Hughes 81'	Report	Cocu 18'; Xavi 75' (pen.)

17 August 2001 Joan Gamper Trophy	Barcelona	3–2	Parma	Barcelona, Spain
	Saviola 31'; Christanval 34'; Rochemback (yellow card) 37'; Cocu (yellow card) 50'; Alfonso 76'	Report	Bolaño (yellow card) 9'; Di Vaio 78'; Cannavaro (yellow card) 24' (goal) 80'	Stadium: Camp Nou; Attendance: c. 50,000; Referee: Arturo Daudén Ibáñez (Spain)

29 May 2002 Invitation Cup	BEC-Tero All Stars	0–0 (3–4 p)	Barcelona	Bangkok, Thailand
		Report		Stadium: Rajamangala Stadium; Attendance: c. 40,000

==== Copa Catalunya ====
29 January 2002 Semi-final	Lleida	1–2	Barcelona	Lleida
	Nakor 71'	Report	Gerard 19'; Coco 39'

7 May 2002 Final	Terrassa	1–1 (4–1 p)	Barcelona	Terrassa
	Goal	Report	Xavi 31'	Stadium: Estadi Olímpic

=== La Liga ===
==== League table ====
Pos	Team	Pld	W	D	L	GF	GA	GD	Pts	Qualification or relegation
2	Deportivo La Coruña	38	20	8	10	65	41	+24	68	Qualification for the Champions League group stage
3	Real Madrid (Note: Real Madrid qualified directly for the 2002–03 UEFA Champions League as holders.)	38	19	9	10	69	44	+25	66	Qualification for the Champions League group stage
4	Barcelona	38	18	10	10	65	37	+28	64	Qualification for the Champions League third qualifying round
5	Celta Vigo	38	16	12	10	64	46	+18	60	Qualification for the UEFA Cup first round
6	Real Betis	38	15	14	9	42	34	+8	59	Qualification for the UEFA Cup first round

Source: LFP
Rules for classification: 1st points; 2nd head-to-head points; 3rd head-to-head goal difference; 4th head-to-head goals scored; 5th goal difference; 6th number of goals scored; 7th Fair-play points

==== Results by round ====
Round	1	2	3	4	5	6	7	8	9	10	11	12	13	14	15	16	17	18	19	20	21	22	23	24	25	26	27	28	29	30	31	32	33	34	35	36	37	38
Ground	A	H	A	H	A	H	A	H	A	H	A	H	A	H	A	H	A	A	H	H	A	H	A	H	A	H	A	H	A	H	A	H	A	H	A	H	H	A
Result	W	D	D	W	W	W	L	D	D	W	L	W	D	L	L	D	W	L	W	W	L	L	W	W	D	W	L	W	L	D	W	D	W	W	L	W	W	D
Position	9	6	8	5	4	1	2	4	5	2	3	2	3	4	8	7	7	8	7	4	8	7	5	5	3	5	4	5	7	5	6	6	4	4	5	5	4	4

Updated to match(es) played on 2008-07-16. Source: LFP.com
A = Away; H = Home; W = Win; D = Draw; L = Loss; = Leader, 2002-03 UEFA Champions League Group stage; = 2002-03 UEFA Champions League Group stage; = 2002-03 UEFA Champions League Qualifying round; = 2002-03 UEFA Cup; = 2002-03 Segunda Division

==== Matches ====
25 August 2001 1	Sevilla	1–2	Barcelona	Sevilla
21:00 CEST	Nicolás Olivera 49' (pen.)	Report	Kluivert 41' 75'	Stadium: Estadio Sanchez Pizjuan

8 September 2001 2	Barcelona	1–1	Rayo Vallecano	Barcelona
20:00 CEST	Rochemback 65'	Report	Arteaga 54' (pen.)	Stadium: Camp Nou

15 September 2001 3	Osasuna	0–0	Barcelona	Pamplona
21:30 CEST		Report		Stadium: Estadio Reyno de Navarra

22 September 2001 4	Barcelona	2–0	Tenerife	Barcelona
21:00 CEST	Geovanni 33'; Saviola 89'	Report		Stadium: Camp Nou

29 September 2001 5	Real Sociedad	0–2	Barcelona	San Sebastián
19:15 CEST		Report	Kluivert 30'; Xavi 76'	Stadium: Estadio Anoeta

3 October 2001 6	Barcelona	3–0	Mallorca	Barcelona
20:45 CEST	Luis Enrique 8' 26'; Saviola 31'	Report		Stadium: Camp Nou

6 October 2001 7	Deportivo La Coruña	2–1	Barcelona	La Coruña
21:30 CEST	Fran 51' 67'	Report	Kluivert 37'	Stadium: Estadio Riazor

14 October 2001 8	Barcelona	2–2	Valencia	Barcelona
19:00 CEST	Saviola 42'; Coco 73'	Report	Ballesta 25'; Marchena 72'	Stadium: Camp Nou

21 October 2001 9	Málaga	1–1	Barcelona	Málaga
19:00 CEST	Silva 74'	Report	Rivaldo 76'

27 October 2001 10	Barcelona	3–0	Betis	Barcelona
21:30 CEST	Saviola 9'; Rivaldo 49' 60'	Report		Stadium: Camp Nou

4 November 2001 11	Real Madrid	2–0	Barcelona	Madrid
20:00 CET	Morientes 23'; Luís Figo 92'	Report		Stadium: Estadio Santiago Bernabéu

11 November 2001 12	Barcelona	4–0	Valladolid	Barcelona
20:00 CET	Saviola 18' 88'; Puyol 20'; Kluivert 63' (pen.)	Report		Stadium: Camp Nou

17 November 2001 13	Las Palmas	0–0	Barcelona	Las Palmas
21:00 WET		Report		Stadium: Estadio Insular

24 November 2001 14	Barcelona	1–2	Athletic Bilbao	Barcelona
21:30 CET	Rivaldo 60'	Report	Urzaiz 10'; Ezquerro 83'	Stadium: Camp Nou

1 December 2001 15	Alavés	2–0	Barcelona	Vitoria
21:30 CET	Llorens 22' (pen.); Begoña 62'	Report

8 December 2001 16	Barcelona	2–2	Celta Vigo	Barcelona
	Gabri 1'; Saviola 47'	Report	Sergi Barjuan 72' (o.g.); Edu 84'	Stadium: Camp Nou

15 December 2001 17	Villarreal	0–1	Barcelona	Villarreal
17:00 CET		Report	Kluivert 38'	Stadium: Estadio de la Ceramica

22 December 2001 18	Espanyol	2–0	Barcelona	Barcelona
21:30 CET	Tamudo 56' 69'	Report		Stadium: Estadi Olímpic Lluís Companys

6 January 2002 19	Barcelona	2–0	Zaragoza	Barcelona
20:00 CET	Kluivert 45'; Saviola 55'	Report		Stadium: Camp Nou

13 January 2002 20	Barcelona	3–1	Sevilla	Barcelona
17:00 CET	Rivaldo 7' 61'; Gabri 56'	Report	Tomás 4'	Stadium: Camp Nou

20 January 2002 21	Rayo Vallecano	2–1	Barcelona	Madrid
17:00 CET	Bolić 24' de Quintana 60'	Report	Xavi 55'	Stadium: Campo Vallecas

26 January 2002 22	Barcelona	0–1	Osasuna	Barcelona
17:00 CET		Report	Alfredo 80'	Stadium: Camp Nou

2 February 2002 23	Tenerife	0–6	Barcelona	Santa Cruz de Tenerife
21:00 WET		Report	Puyol 15'; Kluivert 45' 49' 66' 70'; Charcos 72' (o.g.)	Stadium: Estadio Heliodoro Rodriguez

6 February 2002 24	Barcelona	2–0	Real Sociedad	Barcelona
21:00 CET	Rivaldo 58'; Saviola 77'	Report		Stadium: Camp Nou

9 February 2002 25	Mallorca	0–0	Barcelona	Palma de Mallorca
20:30 CET		Report		Stadium: Estadio Son Moix

17 February 2002 26	Barcelona	3–2	Deportivo La Coruña	Barcelona
21:30 CET	Martín 16' (o.g.); Saviola 73'; Kluivert 88'	Report	Tristan 10'; Sergio 66'	Stadium: Camp Nou

24 February 2002 27	Valencia	2–0	Barcelona	Valencia
21:30 CET	Rufete 16'; Aimar 62'	Report		Stadium: Estadio Mestalla

3 March 2002 28	Barcelona	5–1	Málaga	Barcelona
17:00 CET	Cocu 2'; Saviola 24'; Kluivert 37' (pen.) 77' (pen.) 88'	Report	Leko 67'	Stadium: Camp Nou

9 March 2002 29	Betis	2–1	Barcelona	Sevilla
20:30 CET	Dani 3' 77'	Report	Ito 54' (o.g.)	Stadium: Estadio Benito Villamarin

17 March 2002 30	Barcelona	1–1	Real Madrid	Barcelona
21:30 CET	Xavi 58'	Report	Zidane 38'	Stadium: Camp Nou

24 March 2002 31	Valladolid	1–2	Barcelona	Valladolid
20:00 CET	Luis García 9'	Report	Kluivert 11'; Cocu 41'	Stadium: Estadio Jose Zorrilla

30 March 2002 32	Barcelona	1–1	Las Palmas	Barcelona
21:00 CET	Luis Enrique 20'	Report	Orlando 53'	Stadium: Camp Nou

7 April 2002 33	Athletic Bilbao	0–2	Barcelona	Bilbao
21:30 CEST		Report	Saviola 16' 75'	Stadium: Estadio San Mames

14 April 2002 34	Barcelona	3–2	Alavés	Barcelona
18:30 CEST	Saviola 13' 88'; Rochemback 65'	Report	Magno 70'; Alonso 92'	Stadium: Camp Nou

20 April 2002 35	Celta Vigo	2–1	Barcelona	Vigo
20:45 CEST	Mostovoi 24'; López 61'	Report	Rivaldo 89'	Stadium: Estadio Balaídos

28 April 2002 36	Barcelona	4–1	Villarreal	Barcelona
21:00 CEST	Luis Enrique 54'; Motta 56'; Kluivert 67'; Saviola 72'	Report	Victor 16'	Stadium: Camp Nou

5 May 2002 37	Barcelona	2–0	Espanyol	Barcelona
20:00 CEST	Kluivert 45'; Xavi 75'	Report		Stadium: Camp Nou

12 May 2002 38	Zaragoza	1–1	Barcelona	Zaragoza
21:00 CEST	Aragón 8'	Report	Saviola 43'	Stadium: Estadio La Romareda

=== Copa del Rey ===
==== Round of 64 ====
7 November 2001	Figueres	1–0 (a.e.t.)	Barcelona	Figueres
	Garrido 91'	Report		Stadium: Estadi Municipal De Vilatenim

=== UEFA Champions League ===
==== Third qualifying round ====
8 August 2001	Wisła Kraków (Poland)	3–4	(Spain) Barcelona	Kraków
17:30 CET	Pater 22', 32'; Frankowski 38'	Report	Rivaldo 31' (pen.), 34', 73'; Kluivert 56'	Stadium: Stadion Miejski; Attendance: 7,506; Referee: (Norway) Rune Pedersen

21 August 2001	Barcelona (Spain)	1–0	(Poland) Wisła Kraków	Barcelona
21:15 CET	Luis Enrique 72'	Report		Stadium: Camp Nou; Attendance: 58,233; Referee: (France) Gilles Veissière

==== First group stage ====
===== Group F =====
Team	Pld	W	D	L	GF	GA	GD	Pts	BAR	BL	OL	FEN
(Spain) Barcelona	6	5	0	1	12	5	+7	15		2–1	2–0	1–0
(Germany) Bayer Leverkusen	6	4	0	2	10	9	+1	12	2–1		2–4	2–1
(France) Lyon	6	3	0	3	10	9	+1	9	2–3	0–1		3–1
(Turkey) Fenerbahçe	6	0	0	6	3	12	−9	0	0–3	1–2	0–1	

18 September 2001	Fenerbahçe (Turkey)	0–3	(Spain) Barcelona	Istanbul
20:45		Report	Kluivert 25'; Andersson 28'; Saviola 66'	Stadium: Şükrü Saracoğlu Stadium; Attendance: 23,350; Referee: (Sweden) Anders Frisk

25 September 2001	Bayer Leverkusen (Germany)	2–1	(Spain) Barcelona	Leverkusen
20:45	Yıldıray Baştürk 52'; Neuville 69'	Report	Luis Enrique 22'	Stadium: BayArena; Attendance: 22,000; Referee: (Scotland) Hugh Dallas

10 October 2001	Barcelona (Spain)	2–0	(France) Lyon	Barcelona
20:45	Kluivert 78'; Rivaldo 87' (pen.)	Report		Stadium: Camp Nou; Attendance: 60,757; Referee: (Denmark) Kim Milton Nielsen

17 October 2001	Barcelona (Spain)	2–1	(Germany) Bayer Leverkusen	Barcelona
20:45	Kluivert 12'; Luis Enrique 38'	Report	Ramelow 32'	Stadium: Camp Nou; Attendance: 60,432; Referee: (Italy) Pierluigi Collina

23 October 2001	Lyon (France)	2–3	(Spain) Barcelona	Lyon
20:45	Luyindula 66'; Carrière 88'	Report	Kluivert 9'; Rivaldo 18'; G. López 90+4'	Stadium: Stade de Gerland; Attendance: 37,800; Referee: (England) Graham Poll

31 October 2001	Barcelona (Spain)	1–0	(Turkey) Fenerbahçe	Barcelona
20:45	Rivaldo 90+2'	Report		Stadium: Camp Nou; Attendance: 35,233; Referee: (Scotland) Stuart Dougal

==== Second group stage ====
===== Group B =====
Team	Pld	W	D	L	GF	GA	GD	Pts
(Spain) Barcelona	6	2	3	1	7	7	0	9
(England) Liverpool	6	1	4	1	4	4	0	7
(Italy) Roma	6	1	4	1	6	5	+1	7
(Turkey) Galatasaray	6	0	5	1	5	6	−1	5

20 November 2001	Liverpool (England)	1–3	(Spain) Barcelona	Liverpool
20:45	Owen 27'	Report	Kluivert 41'; Rochemback 65'; Overmars 84'	Stadium: Anfield; Attendance: 41,521; Referee: (Germany) Hellmut Krug

5 December 2001	Barcelona (Spain)	2–2	(Turkey) Galatasaray	Barcelona
20:45	Saviola 49', 66'	Report	Ümit Karan 5'; Fleurquin 41'	Stadium: Camp Nou; Attendance: 45,000; Referee: (Germany) Markus Merk

20 February 2002	Barcelona (Spain)	1–1	(Italy) Roma	Barcelona
20:45	Kluivert 82'	Report	Panucci 57'	Stadium: Camp Nou; Attendance: 90,527; Referee: (France) Gilles Veissière

26 February 2002	Roma (Italy)	3–0	(Spain) Barcelona	Rome
20:45	Emerson 61'; Montella 74'; Tommasi 90+2'	Report		Stadium: Stadio Olimpico; Attendance: 69.900; Referee: (Denmark) Kim Milton Nielsen

13 March 2002	Barcelona (Spain)	0–0	(England) Liverpool	Barcelona
20:45		Report		Stadium: Camp Nou; Attendance: 83,441; Referee: (Greece) Kyros Vassaras

19 March 2002	Galatasaray (Turkey)	0–1	(Spain) Barcelona	Istanbul
20:45		Report	Luis Enrique 58'	Stadium: Ali Sami Yen Stadium; Attendance: 21,011; Referee: (Netherlands) René Temmink

==== Quarter-finals ====
3 April 2002	Panathinaikos (Greece)	1–0	(Spain) Barcelona	Athens
20:45	Basinas 79' (pen.)	Report MatchCentre		Stadium: Leoforos Alexandras Stadium; Attendance: 16,000; Referee: (Norway) Terje Hauge

9 April 2002	Barcelona (Spain)	3–1	(Greece) Panathinaikos	Barcelona
20:45	Luis Enrique 23', 49'; Saviola 61'	Report MatchCentre	Konstantinou 8'	Stadium: Camp Nou; Attendance: 89,200; Referee: (Switzerland) Urs Meier

===== Semi-finals =====
23 April 2002	Barcelona (Spain)	0–2	(Spain) Real Madrid	Barcelona
20:45		Report MatchCentre	Zidane 55'; McManaman 90+2'	Stadium: Camp Nou; Attendance: 98,000; Referee: (Sweden) Anders Frisk

1 May 2002	Real Madrid (Spain)	1–1	(Spain) Barcelona	Madrid
20:45	Raúl 43'	Report MatchCentre	Helguera 49' (o.g.)	Stadium: Santiago Bernabéu Stadium; Attendance: 75,000; Referee: (Italy) Pierluigi Collina

== Statistics ==
=== Players statistics ===
No.	Pos	Nat	Player	Total		La Liga		Copa del Rey		Champions League	
No.	Pos	Nat	Player	Apps	Goals	Apps	Goals	Apps	Goals	Apps	Goals
1	GK	(Argentina) ARG	Bonano	42	-42	27	-26	0	0	15	-16
18	DF	(Spain) ESP	Gabri	42	2	20+9	2	0	0	7+6	0
3	DF	(Netherlands) NED	de Boer	47	0	30+4	0	0	0	12+1	0
17	DF	(France) FRA	Christanval	39	0	26	0	0	0	12+1	0
24	DF	(Spain) ESP	Puyol	51	2	33+2	2	1	0	15	0
21	MF	(Spain) ESP	Luis Enrique	38	10	23	4	0	0	14+1	6
8	MF	(Netherlands) NED	Cocu	50	2	34	2	0	0	15+1	0
6	MF	(Spain) ESP	Xavi	52	4	31+4	4	1	0	13+3	0
23	MF	(Italy) ITA	Coco	33	1	17+6	1	0	0	10	0
9	FW	(Netherlands) NED	Kluivert	50	25	33	18	0	0	16+1	7
7	FW	(Argentina) ARG	Saviola	49	21	27+9	17	1	0	9+3	4
13	GK	(Spain) ESP	Reina	16	-16	11	-11	1	-1	3+1	-4
10	FW	(Brazil) BRA	Rivaldo	33	14	19+1	8	0	0	12+1	6
15	MF	(Brazil) BRA	Rochemback	38	3	16+8	2	1	0	9+4	1
12	DF	(Spain) ESP	Sergi	25	0	15+3	0	0	0	6+1	0
11	MF	(Netherlands) NED	Overmars	32	1	14+6	0	1	0	6+5	1
4	DF	(Sweden) SWE	Andersson	19	1	11+1	0	1	0	6	1
22	MF	(Brazil) BRA	Geovanni	32	1	8+13	1	1	0	4+6	0
28	MF	(Brazil) BRA	Motta	26	1	7+11	1	0+1	0	5+2	0
2	DF	(Netherlands) NED	Reiziger	21	0	6+7	0	0	0	2+6	0
5	DF	(Spain) ESP	Abelardo	12	0	6+1	0	0	0	5	0
14	MF	(Spain) ESP	Gerard	23	1	3+12	0	1	0	2+5	1
20	FW	(Spain) ESP	Alfonso	6	0	1+3	0	1	0	0+1	0
26	DF	(Spain) ESP	Navarro	4	0	0+3	0	1	0	0	0
27	MF	(Spain) ESP	Roberto	3	0	0+1	0	0+1	0	0+1	0
19	FW	(Spain) ESP	Dani García	3	0	0+1	0	1	0	0+1	0
31	MF	(Spain) ESP	Jofre	1	0	0+1	0	0	0	0	0
25	GK	(France) FRA	Dutruel	0	0	0	0	0	0	0	0
30	DF	(Spain) ESP	Oleguer	0	0	0	0	0	0	0	0
35	GK	(Spain) ESP	Valdes	0	0	0	0				
37	MF	(Spain) ESP	Tortolero	0	0	0	0				
29	DF	(Spain) ESP	Nano								

=== Top scorers ===
Name	Nationality	Position	PD	CdR	CdC	CL	Total
Patrick Kluivert	(Netherlands)	Striker	18	0	0	7	25
Javier Saviola	(Argentina)	Striker	17	0	0	4	21
Rivaldo	(Brazil)	Forward	8	0	0	6	14
Luis Enrique	(Spain)	Midfielder	5	0	0	6	11
Xavi	(Spain)	Midfielder	4	0	1	0	5

== See also ==
- FC Barcelona
- 2001–02 UEFA Champions League
- 2001–02 La Liga
- 2001–02 Copa del Rey
