= Nathan Coe =

Australian soccer player

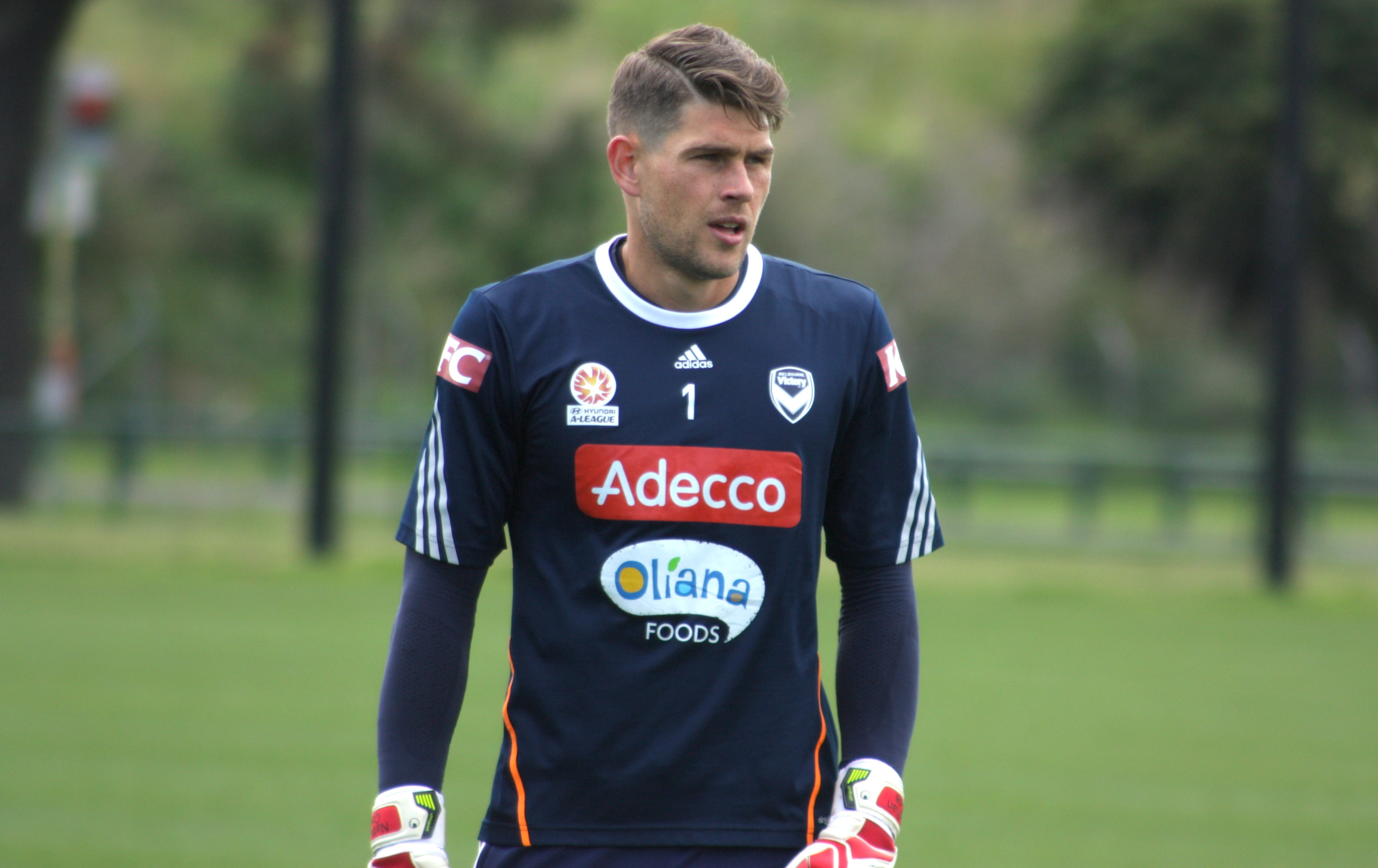
- Coe with Melbourne Victory in 2013

Personal information
- Date of birth: 1 June 1982 (age 44)
- Place of birth: Brisbane, Australia
- Height: 1.83 m (6 ft 0 in)
- Position: Goalkeeper

Team information
- Current team: Bentleigh Greens

Youth career
- Ipswich Town
- 2000–2001: AIS

Senior career*
Years	Team	Apps	(Gls)
2000–2002	Brisbane Strikers	0	(0)
2002–2004	Inter Milan	0	(0)
2004–2007	PSV	0	(0)
2007–2009	Copenhagen	3	(0)
2009	→ Örgryte IS (loan)	5	(0)
2009–2010	Randers	5	(0)
2010–2012	SønderjyskE	64	(0)
2012–2015	Melbourne Victory	73	(0)
2018–	Bentleigh Greens	21	(0)

International career^{‡}
2001	Australia U-17	9	(0)
2002–2003	Australia U-20	11	(0)
2011	Australia	3	(0)

Managerial career
- 2018–: Bentleigh Greens (GK Coach)
Medal record
Representing Australia
Men's Association football
AFC Asian Cup
Runner-up	2011 Qatar
OFC U-20 Championship
Winner	2002 Fiji/Vanuatu
- * Club domestic league appearances and goals as of 30 September 2019 ‡ National team caps and goals as of 27 August 2012

Nathan Coe (born 1 June 1984) is an Australian professional footballer who plays as a goalkeeper for Bentleigh Greens.

== Club career ==
The son of former National Soccer League and Australian under 23 goalkeeper Martin Coe, he was educated at the Anglican Church Grammar School. Born in Brisbane and grew up in Ipswich, England. Coe started his career with Brisbane Strikers. He moved to Italian Serie A club Inter Milan and later to Dutch side PSV Eindhoven. Here he won the 2006 Eredivisie. On 31 January 2007, he moved to Danish F.C. Copenhagen (FCK).

Coe had barely started training at FCK, before he picked up a knee injury, which kept him out until May 2007. His debut for the club came on 15 September 2007 against AC Horsens, while Jesper Christiansen was injured, and here Coe kept a clean sheet in a 1–0 victory. After Coe's debut in 2007, he played for F.C Copenhagen (FCK) in six more games, one of which was a UEFA qualifying match against Cliftonville in 2008.

Out of Coe's seven games with F.C Copenhagen, he kept a total of five clean sheets.

On 14 March 2009, Coe moved for a season long loan (30 June) to Örgryte IS. Örgryte plays in the Swedish top flight division Allsvenskan.

In June 2010, he was transferred to SønderjyskE in an exchange deal which saw SønderjyskEs goalkeeper David Ousted move to Randers FC.

On 24 October 2012, Coe returned to Australia to sign with Melbourne Victory in the Hyundai A-League on a three-year deal. He made his debut for the Victory in their Round 4 clash with the Newcastle Jets, a match which the Victory lost 2–1, courtesy of a double from Emile Heskey. He was released by Melbourne Victory on 23 May 2015.

== International career ==
Coe was called up to the Australian team for the first time against Nigeria on 19 November 2007. With Mark Schwarzer playing, Coe earned himself a place on the bench. Coe was selected for the national team for an international friendly against Egypt on 17 November 2010, but did not play.

He was called up to the national team again for the 2011 Asian Cup in January 2011, and made his international debut for the "Socceroos" as a second-half substitute in a pre-tournament friendly against the UAE. He made two more appearances for his country in friendlies later that year, collecting a total of three senior caps for Australia.

== Career statistics ==
=== Club ===
As of 3 November 2014

Appearances and goals by club, season and competition
Club	Season	League (Note: Includes A-League final series statistics.)			Cup		International (Note: AFC Champions League statistics are included in season ending during group stages (i.e. ACL 2014 and A-League season 2013–2014 etc.))		Total	
Club	Season	Division	Apps	Goals	Apps	Goals	Apps	Goals	Apps	Goals
Inter Milan	2002–03	Serie A	0	0	0	0	0	0	0	0
Inter Milan	2003–04	Serie A	0	0	0	0	0	0	0	0
Inter Milan	Total		0	0	0	0	0	0	0	0
PSV Eindhoven	2004–05	Eredivisie	0	0	0	0	0	0	0	0
PSV Eindhoven	2005–06	Eredivisie	0	0	0	0	0	0	0	0
PSV Eindhoven	2006–07	Eredivisie	0	0	0	0	0	0	0	0
PSV Eindhoven	Total		0	0	0	0	0	0	0	0
Copenhagen	2006–07	Danish Superliga	0	0	0	0	0	0	0	0
Copenhagen	2007–08	Danish Superliga	1	0	?	?	0	0	1	0
Copenhagen	2008–09	Danish Superliga	2	0	1	0	1	0	4	0
Copenhagen	Total		3	0	1	0	1	0	5	0
Örgryte IS	2009	Allsvenskan	5	0	0	0	–		5	0
Randers	2009–10	Danish Superliga	4	0	0	0	–		4	0
SønderjyskE	2010–11	Danish Superliga	33	0	0	0	–		33	0
SønderjyskE	2011–12	Danish Superliga	31	0	3	0	–		34	0
SønderjyskE	Total		64	0	3	0	0	0	67	0
Melbourne Victory	2012–13	A-League	26	0	–		–		26	0
Melbourne Victory	2013–14	A-League	24	0	–		2	0	22	0
Melbourne Victory	2014–15	A-League	23	0	2	0	–		6	0
Melbourne Victory	Total		73	0	2	0	2	0	54	0
Career total			126	0	6	0	3	0	135	0

=== International ===
Appearances and goals by national team and year
National team	Year	Apps	Goals
Australia	2011	3	0
Total		3	0

== Honours ==
PSV Eindhoven

- Eredivisie Championship: 2005–06

F.C. Copenhagen

- Danish Superliga Championship: 2006–07

Melbourne Victory

- A-League Premiership: 2014–15

Australia

- AFC Asian Cup: runner-up 2011

Australia U-20

- OFC U-19 Men's Championship: 2002
