= Mattia Altobelli (footballer, born 1983) =

Italian footballer

Personal information
- Date of birth: 17 August 1983 (age 43)
- Place of birth: Brescia, Italy
- Height: 1.80 m (5 ft 11 in)
- Position: Forward

Youth career
- –2003: Inter Milan

Senior career*
Years	Team	Apps	(Gls)
2002–2006	Inter Milan	0	(0)
2003–2004	→ Spezia (loan)	19	(2)
2004–2005	→ SPAL (loan)	32	(5)
2005–2006	→ Avellino (loan)	8	(0)
2006	→ Sassari Torres (loan)	4	(0)
2006–2007	Chiasso	18	(2)
2007–2009	Lecco	17	(0)
2009	→ Pro Vercelli (loan)	12	(2)
2010–2011	Rodengo Saiano	34	(6)
2011–2012	Colognese	9	(2)
2012	Montichiari	15	(3)
2012–2013	AC Rezzato		
Total		168	(22)
- * Club domestic league appearances and goals

Mattia Altobelli (born 17 August 1983) is an Italian former footballer who plays as a forward.

== Football career ==
Son of the striker Alessandro Altobelli, he started his career at Internazionale where he won the league title with Primavera Reserve team in 2002. He made his Inter first team debut against A.S. Bari in the Coppa Italia on 4 December 2002.

In summer 2003, being too old for the youth team (U-20), he was loaned to sister club Spezia at Serie C1 along with Mathieu Moreau.

He then moved to SPAL of Serie C1 in August 2004, and then loaned to newly promoted Serie B team Avellino in July 2005.

After spent on loan at Sassari Torres at the second half of 2005/06 season, he was transferred to Chiasso of Swiss Challenge League, where he rejoined former youth teammate Wellington.

In summer 2007, Altobelli transferred to newly promoted Serie C1 team Lecco.

In January 2009, he was loaned to Pro Vercelli. and in January 2010 left for Rodengo Saiano.
