= Luca Franchini =

Italian footballer

Personal information
- Full name: Luca Franchini
- Date of birth: 31 December 1983 (age 42)
- Place of birth: Milan, Italy
- Height: 1.83 m (6 ft 0 in)
- Position: Defender

Team information
- Current team: Kim FC
- Number: 40

Youth career
- 1992–2003: Internazionale

Senior career*
Years	Team	Apps	(Gls)
2002–2005	Internazionale	1	(0)
2003–2004	→ Padova (loan)	10	(0)
2004–2005	→ Ascoli (loan)	0	(0)
2005	→ Ancona (loan)	10	(0)
2005–2006	Pro Patria	31	(1)
2006–2009	Mantova	58	(1)
2009–2010	Gallipoli	10	(0)
2011–2012	FC Südtirol		(0)
2012–2013	AC Monza		(0)
	Kim FC	15	(7)

International career
2003–2004	Italy U20	11	(0)
- * Club domestic league appearances and goals as of June 2009

Luca Franchini (born 31 December 1983) is a retired Italian footballer who played as a defender. He is currently a youth coach at Brentford.

== Career ==
Franchini started his career at Internazionale at the age of 8. He started to play as a left back and turned to centre back in 2001, as the team had Giovanni Pasquale. He won the Primavera League title in 2002. In the 2002–03 season, he succeeded Nicola Beati as Primavera team captain, as Beati was promoted to first team. Franchini led the team to enter the League playoffs final, but lost to Lecce in 2–3.

He also made 2 official appearances for Inter's first team in the 2002–03 season, one in Serie A, one in Coppa Italia.

In the summer of 2003, he graduated from the youth team and was loaned to Padova of Serie C1.

In August 2004, he was on loan to Ascoli along with Isah Eliakwu.

Due to failing to enter the first team, in January 2005, he was on loan to Vis Pesaro 1898, but changed to Ancona of Serie C2 on 31 January 2005, the last day of the transfer window.

In summer 2005, he was sold to Pro Patria of Serie C1. A year later, Mantova of Serie B bought him from Pro Patria and signed a 3-year contract In the first season he just played 9 starts in 10 league appearances. In the next season, he played more regularly with 19 starts.

He joined Gallipoli Calcio in August 2009. On 26 January 2011, he signed with FC Südtirol.
