= Nicola Napolitano (footballer) =

Italian footballer

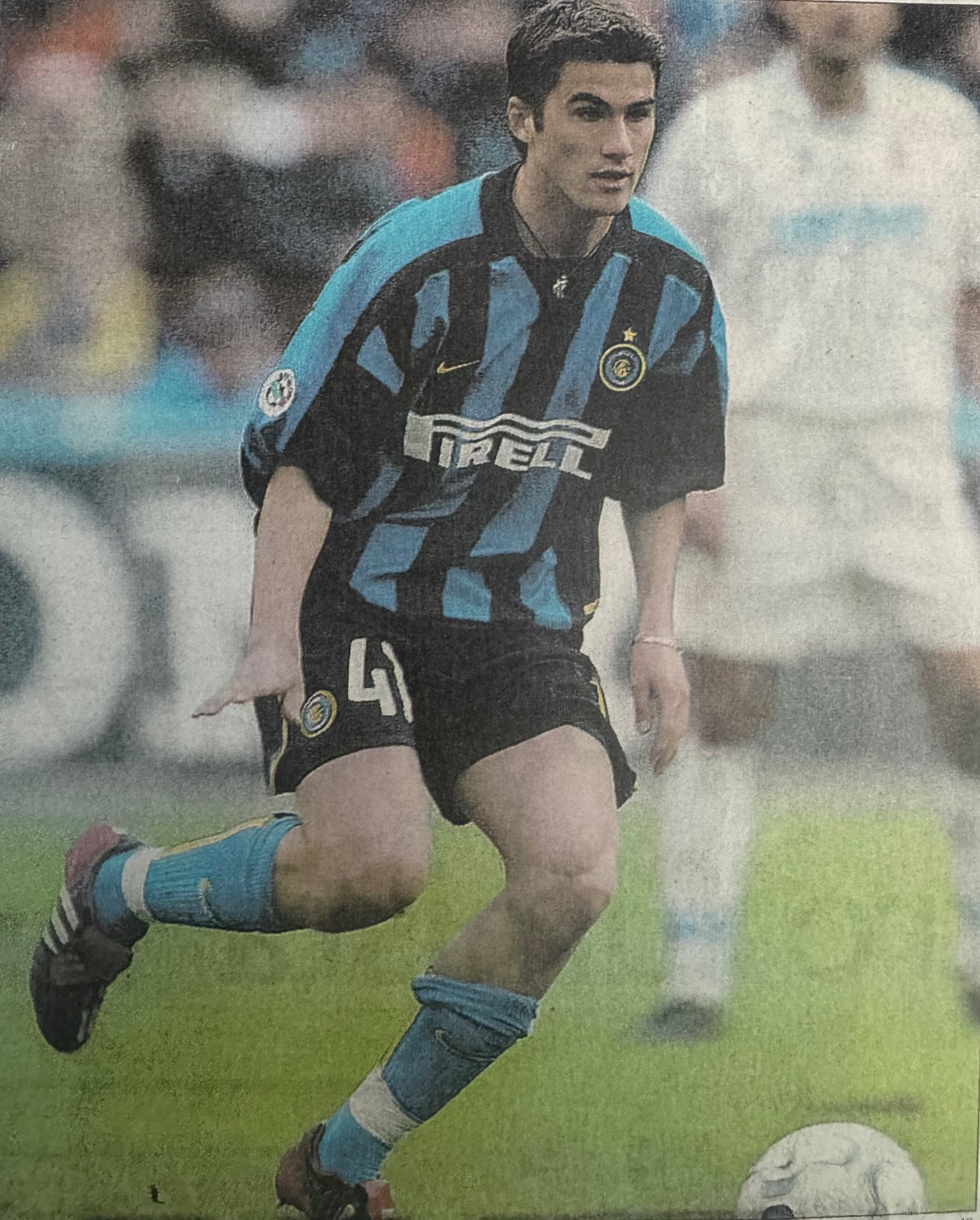
- Nicola Napolitano playing for Internazionale in 2003.

Personal information
- Date of birth: 22 January 1983 (age 43)
- Place of birth: Milan, Italy
- Height: 1.78 m (5 ft 10 in)
- Position: Midfielder

Team information
- Current team: Manfredonia

Youth career
- 2001–2002: Internazionale

Senior career*
Years	Team	Apps	(Gls)
2002–2007	Internazionale	2	(0)
2003–2005	→ Spezia (loan)	18	(0)
2005–2006	→ Pavia (loan)	13	(0)
2006	→ Cremonese (loan)	15	(1)
2007	→ San Marino (loan)	12	(0)
2008	Gubbio	14	(1)
2009–	Manfredonia	7	(0)
- * Club domestic league appearances and goals

Nicola Napolitano (born 22 January 1983) is an Italian footballer who plays for Manfredonia at Lega Pro Seconda Divisione.

Napolitano started his career at his hometown club and Italian giant Internazionale.

He made his professional debut on 19 December 2002, a Coppa Italia match against Bari. In August 2003, he was loaned to Spezia of Serie C1. In July 2005, he was loaned to Pavia along with Riccardo Meggiorini.

Since being released by Inter in summer 2007, he was signed by Gubbio of Lega Pro Seconda Divisione in January 2008. After being unattached again, he was signed by Manfredonia of the same level in January 2009.
