= Andrea Pierobon =

Italian footballer and coach (born 1969)

Personal information
- Date of birth: 19 July 1969 (age 57)
- Place of birth: Cittadella, Italy
- Height: 1.82 m (6 ft 0 in)
- Position: Goalkeeper

Team information
- Current team: Cittadella (Goalkeeper coach)

Youth career
- 1980–1987: Cittadella

Senior career*
| Years | Team | Apps | (Gls) |
| 1987–1990 | Cittadella | 10 | (0) |
| 1990–1993 | Giorgione | 100 | (0) |
| 1993–1994 | Massese | 13 | (0) |
| 1994–1995 | Fidelis Andria | 11 | (0) |
| 1995–1996 | Treviso | 33 | (0) |
| 1996–1997 | Venezia | 14 | (0) |
| 1997–2005 | SPAL | 263 | (0) |
| 2005–2015 | Cittadella | 194 | (0) |
| Total | | 628 | (0) |

Managerial career
- 2015–: Cittadella (GK coach)
- * Club domestic league appearances and goals

Andrea Pierobon (born 19 July 1969) is an Italian football coach and a former player who played mostly for Cittadella as a goalkeeper. He works as a goalkeeping coach with Cittadella. He holds the record for being the oldest professional player in the history of Italian football.

Pierobon rejoined the team that originally signed him to act as a role model for the youth on the squad.

== Honours ==
Cittadella

- Campionato Interregionale: 1987–89

Giorgione

- Campionato Interregionale: 1991–92

Treviso

- Serie C2: 1995–96

SPAL

- Serie C2: 1997–98
- Coppa Italia Serie C: 1998-99
