= Francesco Coco =

Italian footballer (born 1977)

Personal information
- Date of birth: 8 January 1977 (age 49)
- Place of birth: Paternò, Italy
- Height: 1.81 m (5 ft 11 in)
- Position: Left wing-back

Youth career
- 1993–1995: Milan

Senior career*
Years	Team	Apps	(Gls)
1995–2002	Milan	56	(2)
1997–1998	→ Vicenza (loan)	20	(0)
1999–2000	→ Torino (loan)	21	(0)
2001–2002	→ Barcelona (loan)	23	(1)
2002–2007	Internazionale	26	(0)
2005–2006	→ Livorno (loan)	28	(0)
2006–2007	→ Torino (loan)	3	(0)
Total		177	(3)

International career
1994–1995	Italy U18	6	(0)
1995–2000	Italy U21	20	(1)
1997	Italy U23	2	(0)
2000–2002	Italy	17	(0)
- * Club domestic league appearances and goals

Francesco Coco (Italian pronunciation: [franˈtʃesko ˈkɔːko]; born 8 January 1977) is an Italian former footballer who played as a defender. Although naturally right-footed, he played as a left wing-back (his favourite position) or, more commonly, as a left-back. He had spells with both AC Milan and Inter Milan, also spending a season at Barcelona. In his early career, Coco showed much promise and was regarded as a possible successor to Paolo Maldini; however, he failed to live up to expectations.

Coco won two Serie A league titles and represented Italy at the 2002 FIFA World Cup.

== Club career ==
Born in Paternò, Coco spent the majority of his club career with the Milan clubs; first with AC Milan between 1993 and 2002 and later with Inter between 2002 and 2007; he spent the 2001–02 season on loan at FC Barcelona, with generally solid performances (he also had loan spells with Vicenza Calcio and Torino FC). He was part of the Milan teams that won the Serie A in 1995–96 and 1998–99.

In 2002, Milan traded Coco to Inter in a part exchange deal for Clarence Seedorf, worth €28 million. Despite reaching the 2002–03 Champions League semi-finals and winning the 2004–05 Coppa Italia, Coco's spell at Inter was blighted by injuries. Coco has since given interviews stating Inter made a mistake by letting him undergo back surgery in November 2003, telling him he would be out for no more than a month. In the end, he had to recover for two years. In 2005–06, he was loaned to Livorno, after rejecting a move to Newcastle United despite playing a friendly against Yeading F.C. where he impressed in a 5–0 home victory. He played one season at Livorno, and after his loan deal, he returned to Inter. During the summer of 2006, he tried to find a new club, but in the end, all negotiations failed and Coco remained at Inter.

In January 2007, he joined English club Manchester City on a trial but after three days the club told him he was not in their plans. Later the English newspapers alleged that Manchester City was no longer interested in him because he had turned up for training smoking a cigarette. After a loan to Torino for the 2006–07 season, he went back to Inter for the first part of the summer but mutually rescinded his contract with the Milan-based club on 7 September 2007. Later Coco declared his intention to quit football in order to pursue an acting career despite the rumoured interest of MLS sides New England Revolution and New York Red Bulls.

== International career ==
Coco played for the Italy U18 team in the intermediary round of the 1995 UEFA European Under-18 Championship and for the Italy U21 team at the 1996 and 1998 UEFA U-21 Championship qualifying phases, playing also in the final round in the successful 2000 campaign under manager Marco Tardelli. Also, Coco played for the victorious Italy U23 team at the 1997 Mediterranean Games.

Coco's full debut for the Italy national football team came in a 3–0 win against Romania, on 7 October 2000, in a 2002 World Cup qualifying match under Giovanni Trapattoni. He also played for Italy in 2002 FIFA World Cup, and was last called up to the national side in September 2002. He achieved a total of 17 caps with the azzurri.

== Style of play ==
Coco was a quick, physical, and tactically versatile player, who was primarily deployed as an offensive-minded fullback or as a wingback, due to his tenacity, and work-rate, as well as his defensive and offensive attributes. Although he was naturally right-footed, he was also capable of playing both on the right and the left flank. He was known for his strong tackling, physicality, determination, and crossing ability with both feet. Due to his pace, stamina, skill, and technique, he was also occasionally utilised as a wide midfielder in a 3–5–2 or 3–4–3 formation. Despite his talent, he was often injury-prone and inconsistent, while he had a difficult character and lacked discipline off the pitch; his chances were often limited both at club and international level, due to the presence of Paolo Maldini in his position, whom Coco had initially been tipped to replace as Milan and Italy's starting left-back.

== Off the field ==
Coco was not only a football player but also a businessman. Together with his father Antonio, they own shops and he has his own clothing label called "Urban 77". Coco is a celebrity in Italy and is well known in the party and society scene in Italy. He also wrote the foreword for the recently published book Mio marito è un calciatore (My husband is a footballer). Coco also famously had a long relationship with the Italian actress, showgirl, and model Manuela Arcuri.

Following his retirement from professional football, Coco stated that he was interested in pursuing an acting career, and accepted to appear in L'Isola dei Famosi, the Italian celebrity adaptation of the TV format Survivor, which he abandoned voluntarily days after the beginning of the show.

== Honours ==
Milan

- Serie A: 1995–96, 1998–99

Inter

- Coppa Italia: 2004–05

Italy

- UEFA Under-21 European Championship: 2000
- Mediterranean Games: 1997
