= Mario Rebecchi =

Italian footballer (born 1983)

Personal information
- Full name: Mario Rebecchi
- Date of birth: August 31, 1983 (age 43)
- Place of birth: Voghera, Italy
- Height: 1.79 m (5 ft 10 in)
- Position: Midfielder

Team information
- Current team: Lecco

Youth career
- Internazionale

Senior career*
Years	Team	Apps	(Gls)
2002–2003	Internazionale	0	(0)
2004	Genoa (loan)	8	(0)
2004	Parma (loan)	0	(0)
2005	Cremonese (loan)	6	(0)
2005–2008	Lumezzane	74	(4)
2008–2009	Andria	27	(4)
2009–2010	Valle del Giovenco	26	(3)
2010–	Lecco	17	(1)
- * Club domestic league appearances and goals as of February 2010

Mario Rebecchi (born 31 August 1983, in Voghera) is an Italian football midfielder. He currently plays for Lecco.

== Career ==
Rebecchi started his career at Internazionale. He made his first team debut against A.S. Bari of a Coppa Italia match, on 4 December 2002.

In January 2004, he was loaned out to Genoa C.F.C. of Serie B.

On July 12, 2004, he was loaned to Parma, but returned to Inter on August 31, which was the last day of transfer window.

He left for Cremonese in January 2005. Cremonese was later crowned the champion of Serie C1A.

In the summer of 2005, Rebecchi was sold to Serie C1 side Lumezzane in joint-ownership bid, for €85,000, and Lumezzane got full ownership two years later, for free.

After a successful stint with Andria, he was signed in 2009 by Valle del Giovenco.
