= Andrés Guglielminpietro =

Argentine footballer and manager

Personal information
- Full name: Andrés Guglielminpietro
- Date of birth: 10 April 1974 (age 52)
- Place of birth: San Nicolás, Argentina
- Height: 6 ft 0 in (1.83 m)
- Position: Midfielder

Senior career*
Years	Team	Apps	(Gls)
1994–1998	Gimnasia	105	(21)
1998–2001	Milan	57	(6)
2001–2004	Internazionale	30	(0)
2003–2004	→ Bologna (loan)	18	(2)
2004–2005	Boca Juniors	24	(6)
2005–2006	Al-Nasr Dubai	9	(4)
2006	→ Gimnasia (loan)	11	(1)
Total		254	(40)

International career
1999	Argentina	6	(0)

Managerial career
- 2007: Estudiantes (assistant)
- 2008: River Plate (assistant)
- 2009–2010: San Lorenzo (assistant)
- 2009–2010: San Lorenzo B
- 2013: Quilmes (assistant)
- 2014–2015: Douglas Haig
- 2015–2016: Nueva Chicago
- 2016: Central Córdoba
- 2017: Douglas Haig
- * Club domestic league appearances and goals

Andrés Guglielminpietro (born 10 April 1974), nicknamed Guly, is an Argentine football coach, agent and former player.

A midfielder, he has been capped for the Argentina national football team, and represented his country at the 1999 Copa América.

== Club career ==
Guglielminpietro's club career reached its peak at the Italian club AC Milan, where he shared the limelight with some of the game's most notable stars, such as Paolo Maldini, Demetrio Albertini, Roberto Donadoni, Alessandro Costacurta, Leonardo, George Weah and Oliver Bierhoff. On the final matchday of the season, Guly scored the opening goal in a 2–1 away win against Perugia that won Milan the 1998–99 Scudetto. His play declined during the following seasons due to injuries, and he was transferred to different clubs around the globe, never recovering his top ability. His first port of call after leaving Milan was at rivals Internazionale whom he joined in 2001. He scored his first and what turned out to be his only goal for the club in a UEFA Cup tie against Brașov on 27 September 2001.

In 2004, he won the Copa Sudamericana with Boca Juniors. After a short spell back in his youth club Gimnasia in 2005, he retired.

== International career ==
At the international level, Guly was capped 6 times for Argentina, although he was unable to score a goal. He was a remember of Argentina's 1999 Copa América squad that reached the quarter-finals of the tournament, losing out to eventual champions and South-American rivals Brazil.

== Style of play ==
Although he lacked pace as a winger, Guly was known for his accurate crossing ability from the flank. Playing usually as a wide midfielder, he was also capable of playing as an outside forward.

== Coaching career ==
In June 2007, Guly was added to the coaching staff of cross-town rivals Estudiantes, under coach Diego Simeone, with a third former Argentine international, Nelson Vivas, as assistant coach. Diego Simeone left Estudiantes in December 2007, claiming a supposed lack of the club's commitment to sign appropriate reinforcements for the 2008 Clausura and Copa Libertadores. Guly also took up the same position with the same coaching staff at River Plate in 2008 and San Lorenzo in April 2009, where he also was the manager of the club's reserve team. Simeone and his staff, including Guly, resigned in April 2010. In June 2013, he was the assistant manager of Nelson Vivas, who Guly formerly had worked together with in the coaching staff of Diego Simeone.

On 27 February 2014, Guly was appointed manager for first time, replacing Fernando Quiroz at Douglas Haig. Guly decided to resign on 21 July 2015. On 27 November 2015, he was appointed manager for newly relegated Primera B Nacional club Nueva Chicago. On April 3, 2016, after a 2–1 defeat against Guillermo Brown he decided to resign, leaving the team in fourteenth place, after just ten games with a total of three wins, three draws and four defeats. Later in April 2015, he was appointed manager of Central Córdoba. He left the position two months later.

On 15 March 2017, he returned to Douglas Haig.

== Post-playing career ==
In 2017, Guglielminpietro started working as a football agent, together with the former business team of Jorge Cyterszpiler, Diego Maradona's first agent.

== Honours ==
Milan

- Serie A: 1998–99

Boca Juniors

- Copa Sudamericana: 2004
