= Nicola Beati =

Italian footballer

Personal information
- Date of birth: 13 February 1983 (age 43)
- Place of birth: Perugia, Italy
- Height: 1.81 m (5 ft 11 in)
- Position: Midfielder

Team information
- Current team: Atalanta U23 (head coach)

Youth career
- –2002: Inter Milan

Senior career*
Years	Team	Apps	(Gls)
2001–2007	Inter Milan	3	(0)
2004	→ Triestina (loan)	5	(0)
2005	→ Spezia (loan)	11	(0)
2005–2006	→ Arezzo (loan)	27	(0)
2007	→ Perugia (loan)	7	(0)
2007–2009	Arezzo	57	(2)
2009–2010	Crotone	47	(1)
2011–2012	Frosinone	25	(0)
2012–2013	Sorrento	30	(1)
2014	Foligno	9	(0)
2015	Sammaurese	11	(1)
2015–2016	Sansepolcro	26	(0)
Total		261	(5)

International career
1999	Italy U15	3	(0)
2000	Italy U16	4	(0)
2000–2001	Italy U17	9	(0)
2001	Italy U19	9	(0)
2002–2003	Italy U20	8	(0)
2002	Italy U21	1	(0)

Managerial career
- 2019–2021: Inter Milan U19 (assistant)
- 2021–2022: Venezia (assistant)
- 2022–2023: Empoli (assistant)
- 2024–2026: Hellas Verona (assistant)
- 2026–: Atalanta U23
- * Club domestic league appearances and goals

Nicola Beati (born 13 February 1983) is an Italian professional football coach and a former midfielder who is the head coach of Serie C Group C side Atalanta Under-23.

== Playing career ==
Beati started his career at Inter Milan's youth system. He captained the Primavera side to win the 2001–02 league title. He made his Inter first team debut against Bologna at Serie A, on 17 June 2001.

In second half of 2003–04 and 2004–05 season, he was on loan to Triestina and Spezia.

He was transferred to Arezzo in summer 2005, in co-ownership deal for a peppercorn fee of €500.

Beati left on loan to his hometown club Perugia in January 2007, In June Arezzo got the remain 50% registration rights for free.

In August 2009, Beati signed a three-year contract with Crotone. In January 2011 he swapped club with Caetano.

In 2014 he moved to Foligno Calcio.

== Coaching career ==
On 9 July 2026, Beati was hired by Atalanta as the head coach of their reserve team Atalanta U23 in Serie C.

== Honours ==
Spezia

- Coppa Italia Serie C: 2004–05

Sammaurese

- Eccellenza Emilia-Romagna: 2014–15
