= Wellington (footballer, born January 1982) =

Brazilian footballer

Personal information
- Full name: Wellington Pinto Fraga
- Date of birth: 20 January 1982 (age 44)
- Place of birth: Cachoeiras de Macacu, Brazil
- Height: 1.69 m (5 ft 6 1/2 in)
- Position: Midfielder

Youth career
- Vasco da Gama

Senior career*
Years	Team	Apps	(Gls)
2002–2005	Internazionale	0	(0)
2003–2004	→ Spezia (loan)	5	(0)
2004–2005	→ Vis Pesaro (loan)	10	(0)
2005	→ Sansovino (loan)	0	(0)
2005–2007	Chiasso	52	(2)
2008	Grêmio Jaciara		
2008–2009	União-MT		
2009	Riostrense		
2010	Serra		
2010–2012	Yverdon-Sport	17	(5)
2013–2014	Lusitanos		
- * Club domestic league appearances and goals

Wellington Pinto Fraga (born 20 January 1982 in Cachoeiras de Macacu, Rio de Janeiro) is a Brazilian footballer who plays as a midfielder.

== Football career ==
Wellington was signed by Internazionale in summer 2002. He was loaned to satellite club Spezia in 2003/04 season, and left for Vis Pesaro and A.C. Sansovino in 2004/05.

In summer 2005, he was signed by FC Chiasso.

After released by Chiasso in June 2007, he signed a 6-month contract with Grêmio Jaciara in January 2008. In June 2008, he signed a 1-year contract with União (MT). In July 2009 he left for Riostrense.
