= 2007–08 AS Roma season =

Roma
2007–08 season
- President: Rosella Sensi
- Manager: Luciano Spalletti
- Stadium: Stadio Olimpico
- Serie A: 2nd
- Supercoppa Italiana: Winners
- Coppa Italia: Winners
- UEFA Champions League: Quarter-finals
- Top goalscorer: League: Francesco Totti (14); All: Francesco Totti (18)
- Highest home attendance: 80,023 vs Manchester United (1 April 2008, Champions League)
- Lowest home attendance: 15,000 vs Catania (16 April 2008, Coppa Italia)
- Average home league attendance: 37,276
Home colours	Away colours	Third colours

During the 2007–08 season Associazione Sportiva Roma played the 75th Serie A season in its history.

As in the previous season, Roma finished in second place in Serie A behind Internazionale, but had the chance to win the Championship until the last match.

Further, because giallorossi won the 2006–07 Coppa Italia, they played the Supercoppa Italiana for the second consecutive time against Inter, and won the trophy thanks to a 1–0 victory in the first match of the season in San Siro.

In the European competitions, Roma played 2007–08 UEFA Champions League and, starting from the group stage, beat Real Madrid in the Round of 16, but lost to the eventual champions Manchester United in the quarter-finals.

The last match of the season was the 2007–08 Coppa Italia final against Internazionale, the fourth consecutive final between the two teams. The giallorossi won 2–1, their ninth Coppa Italia triumph.

== Season review ==
=== Pre-season & transfers ===
Early pre-season was dominated by the protracted talks involving the renewal of Cristian Chivu's contract and the many rumours that linked him to many other teams. In fact, the Romanian defender refused a new contract because he already knew he had an offer of about €4M from Internazionale. For this reason in early June Roma extended Philippe Mexès' contract until 2011 and signed Brazilian 2007 Copa América winning defender Juan from Bayer Leverkusen.

The speculation involving Chivu lasted almost two months, and after that he refused to extend his contract with Roma. The player also turned down offers from Barcelona and Real Madrid, stating that if he was not transferred to Inter he would keep playing for Roma until his contract ran out the summer of 2008. For this reason Roma's supporters saw him as a "traitor" and whistled him during a training session in Stadio Flaminio; even Roma's director of football Daniele Pradé stated that the Romanian defender made "incalculable damage" to the club because Real Madrid's offer was higher than the others. Eventually, on 27 July, when it seemed that Chivu would have been a giallorosso until the end of his contract period, Inter made a final offer of 14M€ plus the co-ownership of Marco Andreolli.

Roma also signed Ludovic Giuly, Mauro Esposito and, at the end of August, Cicinho. The loans of Christian Wilhelmsson and Francesco Tavano were not renewed, while Vincenzo Montella was loaned to Sampdoria as he wanted more first-team football. However, Roma bought full ownership of David Pizarro, Mirko Vučinić and Marco Cassetti.

The signings of Matteo Brighi, Ahmed Barusso, and Vitorino Antunes further enlarged the squad, while young players such as Aleandro Rosi, Ricardo Faty, Stefano Okaka, Valerio Virga, Alessio Cerci, Andrea Giacomini and Daniele Galloppa were loaned to lower league clubs to gain experience.

=== First part of the season ===
Roma began the 2007–08 season on 19 August 2007 with the Supercoppa Italiana in San Siro against Internazionale. In the previous season, Roma had lost the Supercoppa 4–3, but on this occasion succeeded in winning (by 1–0) the second Supercoppa in its history, thanks to a penalty by Daniele De Rossi after a foul by Nicolás Burdisso on Francesco Totti.

The 2007–08 Serie A began with Roma as one of the favourites, after Internazionale, Milan and together with Juventus.

The first matches confirmed pre-season expectations of a successful campaign, as Roma started well with a 2–0 win against Palermo with goals from Philippe Mexès and Alberto Aquilani, who also scored in the second match against Siena.

Roma qualified for the 2007–08 UEFA Champions League after finishing second in the 2006–07 season, qualifying directly to the group stage, where they were drawn from the second pot into Group F, together with Manchester United, Sporting CP and Dynamo Kyiv.

After the pause for Italy's Euro 2008 qualifying matches against France and Ukraine, in which Daniele De Rossi, Simone Perrotta, Christian Panucci and Alberto Aquilani played, Roma entered a difficult period of fixtures over a short span of time: from 16 September until 3 October, the giallorossi played against Reggina (winning 2–0), Dynamo Kyiv (winning 2–0), Juventus (drawing 2–2), Fiorentina (drawing 2–2), Internazionale (losing 4–1) and Manchester United (losing 1–0).

Roma won 2–0 in the first match against the Calabrese team thanks to Juan's first goal, a volley with his heel, and the second goal by Francesco Totti, who also scored in the 2–0 victory against Ukrainian champions Dynamo Kyiv. In the following two games against Juventus and Fiorentina, Roma led 2–1 but failed to hold on for the win, conceding the equalizer in the last minutes of both games.

After having played Juventus on Sunday and Fiorentina on Wednesday, Roma faced champions Inter on Saturday, 29 September. The giallorossi lost 4–1, but the defeat was abetted by a handball in the penalty area from Ludovic Giuly who was sent off and cost Roma a penalty, after which the numerical inferiority and the disadvantage opened the nerazzurri's overwhelming victory. -

After losing their position as Serie A league leaders, Roma had to face Manchester United for the first time since their débâcle the previous season at the hands of the English champions in the quarter-finals where they had lost 7–1 . Roma lost this time too, but missed many chances, and even the scorer game's only goal, Wayne Rooney, stated that "Roma deserved more". In addition to ending the first match of the season without scoring a goal, the giallorossi lost Alberto Aquilani to a groin injury that would keep him out of play for more than a month, preventing him from playing the derby.

Roma won their next match 3–0 against Parma, thanks to two goals by Francesco Totti and one by Mancini, thus leaving behind a poor run of two draws and two defeats before the break for the Euro 2008 qualifying matches. After the international break Roma played out a thrilling 4–4 draw against Napoli.

In the third Champions League group stage match, Roma had to face Sporting CP and, though Totti was injured, the team won thanks to goals by Juan and Mirko Vučinić, who dribbled two Portuguese defenders before scoring and assuring Roma second place in Group F, after three matches. The Montenegrin captain was also the protagonist of the second consecutive victory in San Siro against Milan, scoring the only goal of the game.

On 31 October 2007 the giallorossi played the Derby della Capitale against Lazio without three important first team players (Totti, Alberto Aquilani and Rodrigo Taddei), all out with injury. Despite this, Roma won 3–2 thanks to the third goal in three matches from Mirko Vučinić (evening the score after a goal from Lazio's Tommaso Rocchi), the second goal of the league campaign for Mancini and the winning goal by Simone Perrotta.

== Players ==
=== Squad information ===
Last updated on 18 May 2008
Appearances include league matches only

No.	Name	Nat	Position(s)	Date of birth (Age at end of season)	Signed from	Signed in	Apps.	Goals
Goalkeepers
1	Gianluca Curci	(Italy)	GK	12 July 1985 (aged 22)	(Italy) Youth Sector	2004	29	0
25	Carlo Zotti	(Italy)	GK	3 September 1982 (aged 25)	(Italy) Palermo	2001	14	0
27	Júlio Sérgio	(Brazil)	GK	8 November 1978 (aged 29)	(Brazil) América	2006	0	0
32	Doni	(Brazil)	GK	22 October 1979 (aged 28)	(Brazil) Juventude	2005	97	0
Defenders
2	Christian Panucci (Vice-Captain)	(Italy)	RB / CB	12 April 1973 (aged 35)	(France) Monaco	2001	207	17
3	Cicinho	(Brazil)	RB	24 June 1980 (aged 28)	(Spain) Real Madrid	2007	30	2
4	Juan	(Brazil)	CB	1 February 1979 (aged 29)	(Germany) Bayer Leverkusen	2007	22	2
5	Philippe Mexès	(France)	CB	30 March 1982 (aged 26)	(France) Auxerre	2004	113	7
13	Marco Andreolli	(Italy)	CB	10 June 1986 (aged 22)	(Italy) Internazionale	2007	0	0
15	Vitorino Antunes	(Portugal)	LB	1 April 1987 (aged 21)	(Portugal) Paços de Ferreira	2007	5	0
21	Matteo Ferrari	(Italy)	CB	5 December 1979 (aged 28)	(Italy) Parma	2004	78	2
22	Max Tonetto	(Italy)	LB	18 November 1974 (aged 33)	(Italy) Sampdoria	2006	65	1
77	Marco Cassetti	(Italy)	RB	29 May 1977 (aged 31)	(Italy) Lecce	2006	55	2
Midfielders
7	David Pizarro	(Chile)	CM / DM	11 September 1979 (aged 28)	(Italy) Internazionale	2006	63	4
8	Alberto Aquilani	(Italy)	CM / AM	7 July 1984 (aged 23)	(Italy) Youth Sector	2002	88	7
11	Rodrigo Taddei	(Brazil)	LM / RM / AM	6 March 1980 (aged 28)	(Italy) Siena	2005	93	19
14	Ludovic Giuly	(France)	RW / AM	10 July 1976 (aged 31)	(Spain) Barcelona	2007	32	6
16	Daniele De Rossi	(Italy)	DM / CM	24 July 1983 (aged 24)	(Italy) Youth Sector	2001	155	17
20	Simone Perrotta	(Italy)	LM / CM / AM	17 September 1977 (aged 30)	(Italy) Chievo	2004	128	21
30	Mancini	(Brazil)	LW / RW / AM	1 August 1980 (aged 27)	(Italy) Venezia	2003	154	40
33	Matteo Brighi	(Italy)	CM	14 February 1981 (aged 27)	(Italy) Juventus	2004	24	1
Forwards
9	Mirko Vučinić	(Montenegro)	CF / ST	1 October 1983 (aged 24)	(Italy) Lecce	2006	58	11
10	Francesco Totti (Captain)	(Italy)	AM / LW / SS / CF / ST	27 September 1976 (aged 31)	(Italy) Youth Sector	1992	395	165
18	Mauro Esposito	(Italy)	RW	13 June 1979 (aged 29)	(Italy) Cagliari	2007	8	0
36	Claudio Della Penna	(Italy)	RW / LW	12 May 1989 (aged 19)	(Italy) Youth Sector	2007	0	0
Players transferred during the season
17	Édgar Álvarez	(Honduras)	RM	9 January 1980 (aged 28)	(Uruguay) Peñarol	2005	21	0
28	Aleandro Rosi	(Italy)	RB	17 May 1987 (aged 21)	(Italy) Youth Sector	2004	37	2
29	Ahmed Barusso	(Ghana)	CM	26 December 1984 (aged 23)	(Italy) Rimini	2007	3	0
31	Samuel Kuffour	(Ghana)	CB	3 September 1976 (aged 31)	(Germany) Bayern Munich	2005	21	0

== Transfers ==
=== In ===
—	MF	ROU	Adrian Piț (free transfer, from Bellinzona)
—	MF	GHA	Ahmed Barusso (co-ownership from Rimini)
—	GK	ITA	Carlo Zotti (loan return from Sampdoria)
—	MF	SUI	Daniel Unal (loan from Bellinzona)
—	MF	CHI	David Pizarro (full ownership from Internazionale)
—	MF	HON	Édgar Álvarez (loan return from Messina)
—	DF	BRA	Juan (full ownership from Bayer Leverkusen)
—	FW	ITA	Keivan Zarineh (free transfer, from Rieti)
—	MF	FRA	Ludovic Giuly (from Barcelona)
—	DF	ITA	Marco Andreolli (co-ownership from Internazionale)
—	DF	ITA	Marco Cassetti (full ownership from Lecce)
—	MF	ITA	Matteo Brighi (loan return from Chievo)
—	MF	ITA	Mauro Esposito (co-ownership from Cagliari)
—	FW	MNE	Mirko Vučinić (full ownership from Lecce)
—	DF	GHA	Samuel Kuffour (loan return from Livorno)
—	FW	COD	Shabani Nonda (loan return from Blackburn Rovers)
—	DF	BRA	Cicinho (full ownership from Real Madrid)
—	DF	POR	Vitorino Antunes (loan from Paços de Ferreira)

=== Out ===
—	FW	NGA	Adewade Dauda Wahab (loan, to Bellinzona)
—	FW	ITA	Alessandro Simonetta (full ownership, to Arezzo)
—	FW	ITA	Alessandro Tulli (co-ownership renewed, to Lecce)
—	FW	ITA	Alessio Cerci (loan, to Pisa)
—	MF	ITA	Andrea Giacomini (loan, to Vicenza)
—	MF	SWE	Christian Wilhelmsson (end of loan, to Nantes)
—	DF	ROU	Cristian Chivu (to Internazionale)
—	DF	ITA	Damiano Ferronetti (full ownership, to Parma)
—	FW	ITA	Daniele Corvia (full ownership, to Siena)
—	MF	ITA	Daniele Galloppa (co-ownership, to Siena)
—	DF	ITA	Daniele Magliocchetti (loan, to Cagliari)
—	FW	ITA	Francesco Tavano (end of loan, to Valencia)
—	DF	ITA	Gianluca Comotto (full ownership, to Torino)
—	MF	ITA	Gianluca Galasso (co-ownership, to Bari)
—	DF	CRC	Gilberto Martinez (end of loan, to Brescia)
—	DF	ITA	Giuseppe Scurto (full ownership, to Chievo)
—	MF	SEN	Ricardo Faty (loan, to Bayer Leverkusen)
—	DF	BRA	Rodrigo Defendi (end of loan, to Tottenham Hotspur)
—	MF	ITA	Simone Palermo (loan, to Rimini)
—	FW	ITA	Stefano Okaka (loan, to Modena)
—	MF	ITA	Valerio Virga (loan, to Grosseto)
—	FW	ITA	Vincenzo Montella (loan, to Sampdoria)
—	FW	ITA	Keivan Zarineh (to Cisco Roma)
—	FW	COD	Shabani Nonda (to Galatasaray)
—	MF	HON	Édgar Álvarez (on loan to Livorno)
—	DF	ITA	Gianluca Freddi (to Grosseto)
—	GK	ITA	Pietro Pipolo (on loan to Potenza)
—	DF	GHA	Samuel Kuffour (on loan to Ajax)
—	DF	ITA	Dario Polverini (loan to Prato)

== Competitions ==
=== Overall ===
Competition	Started round	Final position	First match	Last match
Serie A	Matchday 1	Runners-up	26 August 2007	18 May 2008
Supercoppa Italiana	Final	Winners	19 August 2007	
Coppa Italia	Round of 16	Winners	19 December 2007	24 May 2008
Champions League	Group stage	Quarter-finals	19 September 2007	9 April 2008

Last updated: 24 May 2008

=== Supercoppa Italiana ===
19 August 2007	Internazionale	0–1	Roma	Milan
20:45 CEST (UTC+02:00)			De Rossi 78' (pen.)	Stadium: San Siro; Attendance: 34,898; Referee: Roberto Rosetti

=== Serie A ===
==== League table ====
Pos	Team	Pld	W	D	L	GF	GA	GD	Pts	Qualification or relegation
1	Internazionale (C)	38	25	10	3	69	26	+43	85	Qualification to Champions League group stage
2	Roma	38	24	10	4	72	37	+35	82	Qualification to Champions League group stage
3	Juventus	38	20	12	6	72	37	+35	72	Qualification to Champions League third qualifying round
4	Fiorentina	38	19	9	10	55	39	+16	66	Qualification to Champions League third qualifying round
5	Milan	38	18	10	10	66	38	+28	64	Qualification to UEFA Cup first round (Note: The 7th-placed team qualified for the UEFA Cup due to both of the Coppa Italia finalists, Roma and Internazionale, finishing 6th or higher.)

Source: Serie A
Rules for classification: 1) points; 2) head-to-head points; 3) head-to-head goal difference; 4) head-to-head goals scored; 5) goal difference; 6) number of goals scored.
(C) Champions

==== Results summary ====
Overall								Home						Away					
Pld	W	D	L	GF	GA	GD	Pts	W	D	L	GF	GA	GD	W	D	L	GF	GA	GD
38	24	10	4	72	37	+35	82	15	3	1	43	20	+23	9	7	3	29	17	+12

Last updated: 18 May 2008.
Source: Competitive matches

==== Results by round ====
Round	1	2	3	4	5	6	7	8	9	10	11	12	13	14	15	16	17	18	19	20	21	22	23	24	25	26	27	28	29	30	31	32	33	34	35	36	37	38
Ground	A	H	A	H	A	H	A	H	A	H	A	H	A	H	A	A	H	A	H	H	A	H	A	H	A	H	A	H	A	H	A	H	A	H	H	A	H	A
Result	W	W	W	D	D	L	W	D	W	W	D	W	W	W	D	D	W	W	W	W	L	W	L	W	D	W	W	W	L	W	D	W	W	D	W	W	W	D
Position	5	2	1	1	1	4	3	4	2	2	3	2	2	2	2	2	2	2	2	2	2	2	2	2	2	2	2	2	2	2	2	2	2	2	2	2	2	2

Source: Competitive matches
A = Away; H = Home; W = Win; D = Draw; L = Loss; = Leader, UEFA Champions League Groups stage; = UEFA Champions League Groups stage; = UEFA Champions League Qualifying round; = 2008–09 UEFA Cup; = 2008–09 Serie B

==== Matches ====
26 August 2007 1	Palermo	0–2	Roma	Palermo
20:30 CEST (UTC+02:00)	Barzagli (yellow card) 17'; Guana (yellow card) 53'; Bresciano (yellow card) 64'	Report	Mexès 4'; Aquilani 27'; Brighi (yellow card) 76'	Stadium: Stadio Renzo Barbera; Attendance: 32,202; Referee: Emidio Morganti

2 September 2007 2	Roma	3–0	Siena	Rome
15:00 CEST (UTC+02:00)	Aquilani 17'; Giuly 82'; Totti 89'; Cassetti (yellow card) 90+4'	Report	Galloppa (yellow card) 51'; Codrea (yellow card) 55'	Stadium: Stadio Olimpico; Attendance: 35,000; Referee: Antonio Damato

16 September 2007 3	Reggina	0–2	Roma	Reggio Calabria
15:00 CEST (UTC+02:00)	Cascione (yellow card) 30'; Tullberg (yellow card) 50'; Valdez (red card) 53'; Ceravolo (yellow card) 84'	Report	Tonetto (yellow card) 23'; Taddei (yellow card) 45'; Juan 51'; Totti 85'	Stadium: Stadio Oreste Granillo; Attendance: 14,030; Referee: Gianluca Rocchi

23 September 2007 4	Roma	2–2	Juventus	Rome
15:00 CEST (UTC+02:00)	Mancini (yellow card) 18'; Totti 30', 36'; De Rossi (yellow card) 49'	Report	Trezeguet 17'; Iaquinta (yellow card) 18', (goal) 88'; Criscito (yellow card) 23'; Chiellini (yellow card) 80'	Stadium: Stadio Olimpico; Attendance: 62,241; Referee: Emidio Morganti

26 September 2007 5	Fiorentina	2–2	Roma	Florence
20:30 CEST (UTC+02:00)	Gamberini 24'; Donadel (yellow card) 45' (yellow-red card) 85'; Mutu (yellow card) 76', (goal) 80' (pen.); Montolivo (yellow card) 90'	Report	Mexès (yellow card) 16'; Mancini 19'; Giuly 37'; Ferrari (yellow card) 79'	Stadium: Stadio Artemio Franchi; Attendance: 36,056; Referee: Mauro Bergonzi

29 September 2007 6	Roma	1–4	Internazionale	Rome
18:00 CEST (UTC+02:00)	Giuly (red card) 29'; Perrotta 53'; Pizarro (yellow card) 73'	Report	Ibrahimović 29' (pen.); Samuel (yellow card) 45'; Crespo 57'; Cruz 60'; Córdoba 68'	Stadium: Stadio Olimpico; Attendance: 51,150; Referee: Nicola Rizzoli

7 October 2007 7	Parma	0–3	Roma	Parma
15:00 CEST (UTC+02:00)	Couto (yellow card) 3'; Corradi (yellow card) 17' (yellow-red card) 26'; Paci (yellow card) 32'	Report	Totti 2', 82'; Vučinić (yellow card) 15'; Mancini 21', (yellow card) 55'; De Rossi (yellow card) 54'	Stadium: Stadio Ennio Tardini; Attendance: 16,922; Referee: Luca Banti

20 October 2007 8	Roma	4–4	Napoli	Rome
18:00 CEST (UTC+02:00)	Totti 30' (pen.); Perrotta 42'; De Rossi 52', (yellow card) 62'; Ferrari (yellow card) 53'; Pizarro 80'	Report	Lavezzi 2', (yellow card) 29'; Hamšík 46', (yellow card) 59'; Cupi (yellow card) 58'; Gargano 64'; Zalayeta 84'	Stadium: Stadio Olimpico; Attendance: 27,313; Referee: Paolo Tagliavento

28 October 2007 9	Milan	0–1	Roma	Milan
15:00 CET (UTC+01:00)	Ambrosini (yellow card) 12' (yellow-red card) 80'; Nesta (yellow card) 40'; Pirlo (yellow card) 52'; Favalli (yellow card) 82'; Seedorf (yellow card) 89'	Report	Vučinić (yellow card) 38', (goal) 72'; Mexès (yellow card) 67'; Panucci (yellow card) 85'; De Rossi (yellow card) 87'	Stadium: San Siro; Attendance: 60,205; Referee: Roberto Rosetti

31 October 2007 10	Roma	3–2	Lazio	Rome
20:30 CET (UTC+01:00)	Vučinić 19', (yellow card) 20'; Mancini 42'; Cassetti (yellow card) 45'; Perrotta 56'; De Rossi (yellow card) 61'; Pizarro (yellow card) 84'	Report	Rocchi 12', (yellow card) 61'; Pandev (yellow card) 61'; Ledesma 69'; Mutarelli (yellow card) 88'	Stadium: Stadio Olimpico; Attendance: 54,860; Referee: Gianluca Rocchi

4 November 2007 11	Empoli	2–2	Roma	Empoli
15:00 CET (UTC+01:00)	Raggi (yellow card) 55'; Saudati (yellow card) 62'; Vannucchi 67'; Marchisio (yellow card) 76'; Giovinco 90+1'	Report	Giuly 13'; Brighi 32', (yellow card) 64'; Ferrari (yellow card) 64'; Barusso (yellow card) 82'; Cassetti (yellow card) 84'	Stadium: Stadio Carlo Castellani; Attendance: 9,657; Referee: Luca Banti

5 December 2007 12	Roma	2–0	Cagliari	Rome
20:30 CET (UTC+01:00)	Taddei 28', 36', (yellow card) 64'	Report	Bianco (yellow card) 22'; Agostini (yellow card) 90+1'	Stadium: Stadio Olimpico; Attendance: 31,000; Referee: Daniele Orsato

24 November 2007 13	Genoa	0–1	Roma	Genoa
18:00 CET (UTC+01:00)	Danilo (yellow card) 45'; Paro (yellow card) 51'; Bovo (yellow card) 79'; Bega (yellow card) 86'; Jurić (yellow card) 89'	Report	Ferrari (yellow card) 72'; Panucci 90'	Stadium: Stadio Luigi Ferraris; Attendance: 24,106; Referee: Roberto Rosetti

2 December 2007 14	Roma	2–1	Udinese	Rome
15:00 CET (UTC+01:00)	Juan 10'; Taddei 26', (yellow card) 48'; De Rossi (yellow card) 43'; Tonetto (yellow card) 65'	Report	Quagliarella 11'; D'Agostino (yellow card) 25'; Pepe (yellow card) 71'; Pinzi (red card) 78'; Dossena (red card) 79'	Stadium: Stadio Olimpico; Attendance: 32,323; Referee: Massimiliano Saccani

9 December 2007 15	Livorno	1–1	Roma	Livorno
15:00 CET (UTC+01:00)	Tristán 6', (yellow card) 47'; Balleri (yellow card) 18'	Report	De Rossi 5'; Taddei (yellow card) 27'	Stadium: Stadio Armando Picchi; Attendance: 8,254; Referee: Nicola Rizzoli

16 December 2007 16	Torino	0–0	Roma	Turin
15:00 CET (UTC+01:00)	Bjelanović (yellow card) 7'; Dellafiore (yellow card) 8'; Lanna (yellow card) 38'; Comotto (red card) 90'	Report	De Rossi (yellow card) 23'; Panucci (yellow card) 38'; Mexès (yellow card) 72'	Stadium: Stadio Olimpico di Torino; Attendance: 18,501; Referee: Gianluca Rocchi

22 December 2007 17	Roma	2–0	Sampdoria	Rome
20:30 CET (UTC+01:00)	Totti 18' (pen.), 90'; Pizarro (yellow card) 38'; Cassetti (yellow card) 38'; De Rossi (yellow card) 85'	Report	Gastaldello (yellow card) 17'; Lucchini (yellow card) 18'; Volpi (yellow card) 48' (yellow-red card) 57'	Stadium: Stadio Olimpico; Attendance: 30,000; Referee: Andrea Gervasoni

13 January 2008 18	Atalanta	1–2	Roma	Bergamo
15:00 CET (UTC+01:00)	Carrozzieri (yellow card) 12'; Ferreira Pinto 17'; Guarente (yellow card) 52'; Langella (yellow card) 54'	Report	Totti 38'; Panucci (yellow card) 42'; Mancini 45'; Mexès (yellow card) 55'; Doni (yellow card) 67'; Tonetto (yellow card) 70'; Aquilani (yellow card) 90+3'	Stadium: Stadio Atleti Azzurri d'Italia; Attendance: 7,662; Referee: Massimiliano Saccani

20 January 2008 19	Roma	2–0	Catania	Rome
15:00 CET (UTC+01:00)	Giuly 8', (yellow card) 74'; Mexès (yellow card) 22'; De Rossi (yellow card) 27', (goal) 57' (pen.)	Report	Terlizzi (yellow card) 56'; Sardo (yellow card) 59'; Baiocco (yellow card) 73'; Mascara (yellow card) 85'	Stadium: Stadio Olimpico; Attendance: 33,378; Referee: Daniele Orsato

26 January 2008 20	Roma	1–0	Palermo	Rome
20:30 CET (UTC+01:00)	Cassetti (yellow card) 48'; Mancini 59'	Report	Simplício (yellow card) 20'; Rinaudo (red card) 57'	Stadium: Stadio Olimpico; Attendance: 32,618; Referee: Christian Brighi

3 February 2008 21	Siena	3–0	Roma	Siena
15:00 CET (UTC+01:00)	Vergassola 11'; De Ceglie (yellow card) 15'; Tonetto 43' (o.g.); Manninger (yellow card) 74'; Frick 83'	Report	Totti (yellow card) 74'; De Rossi (yellow card) 77'; Mancini (yellow card) 86'	Stadium: Stadio Artemio Franchi – Montepaschi Arena; Attendance: 10,158; Referee: Paolo Dondarini

9 February 2008 22	Roma	2–0	Reggina	Rome
20:30 CET (UTC+01:00)	Panucci 21'; Aquilani (yellow card) 27'; Cicinho (yellow card) 63'; Mancini 76'	Report	Valdez (yellow card) 74'	Stadium: Stadio Olimpico; Attendance: 31,635; Referee: Luca Banti

16 February 2008 23	Juventus	1–0	Roma	Turin
20:30 CET (UTC+01:00)	Del Piero 45'; Chiellini (yellow card) 55'; Nocerino (yellow card) 85'	Report	Mexès (yellow card) 40'; Mancini (yellow card) 77'	Stadium: Stadio Olimpico di Torino; Attendance: 21,139; Referee: Massimiliano Saccani

24 February 2008 24	Roma	1–0	Fiorentina	Rome
15:00 CET (UTC+01:00)	Cicinho 54', (yellow card) 85' (yellow-red card) 90+2'; De Rossi (yellow card) 66'; Perrotta (yellow card) 90'	Report	Vieri (yellow card) 45+1'	Stadium: Stadio Olimpico; Attendance: 34,254; Referee: Emidio Morganti

27 February 2008 25	Internazionale	1–1	Roma	Milan
20:30 CET (UTC+01:00)	Burdisso (yellow card) 51'; Zanetti 88'; Balotelli (yellow card) 90+1'	Report	Totti 38'; Taddei (yellow card) 58'; Mexès (yellow card) 83' (yellow-red card) 84'; Perrotta (yellow card) 90+4'	Stadium: San Siro; Attendance: 48,717; Referee: Roberto Rosetti

1 March 2008 26	Roma	4–0	Parma	Rome
18:00 CET (UTC+01:00)	Aquilani 27', (yellow card) 34'; Falcone 51' (o.g.); Totti 80'; Vučinić 90+4'	Report	Gasbarroni (yellow card) 45+1'; Castellini (yellow card) 54'; Rossi (yellow card) 76'; Dessena (yellow card) 90+1'	Stadium: Stadio Olimpico; Attendance: 31,788; Referee: Gianluca Rocchi

9 March 2008 27	Napoli	0–2	Roma	Naples
15:00 CET (UTC+01:00)	Mannini (yellow card) 49'; Domizzi (yellow card) 69'; Blasi (yellow card) 76'	Report	Perrotta 2'; Totti 49' (pen.)	Stadium: Stadio San Paolo; Attendance: 59,272; Referee: Massimiliano Saccani

15 March 2008 28	Roma	2–1	Milan	Rome
20:30 CET (UTC+01:00)	Giuly 78'; Vučinić 81'	Report	Gattuso (yellow card) 47'; Kaká 56'; Pato (yellow card) 66'; Favalli (yellow card) 85'	Stadium: Stadio Olimpico; Attendance: 48,447; Referee: Nicola Rizzoli

19 March 2008 29	Lazio	3–2	Roma	Rome
21:15 CET (UTC+01:00)	Siviglia (yellow card) 25'; Kolarov (yellow card) 37'; Pandev 43'; Dabo (yellow card) 45+1'; Rocchi 57' (pen.); Behrami 90+2'	Report	Mexès (yellow card) 20'; Taddei 31'; Aquilani (yellow card) 54'; Juan (yellow card) 57'; Perrotta 62'	Stadium: Stadio Olimpico; Attendance: 49,284; Referee: Emidio Morganti

22 March 2008 30	Roma	2–1	Empoli	Rome
15:00 CET (UTC+01:00)	Tonetto 36'; De Rossi (yellow card) 43'; Perrotta (red card) 57'; Panucci (yellow card) 61', (goal) 63'; Vučinić (yellow card) 84'	Report	Raggi (yellow card) 10'; Piccolo (yellow card) 40'; Giovinco 50'; Abate (yellow card) 82'	Stadium: Stadio Olimpico; Attendance: 31,392; Referee: Gabriele Gava

29 March 2008 31	Cagliari	1–1	Roma	Cagliari
18:00 CET (UTC+01:00)	Ferrari 3' (o.g.); Storari (yellow card) 84'	Report	Tonetto (yellow card) 19'; Totti 45'; Pizarro (yellow card) 66'; Cicinho (yellow card) 77'; Cassetti (yellow card) 85'	Stadium: Stadio Sant'Elia; Referee: Massimiliano Saccani

5 April 2008 32	Roma	3–2	Genoa	Rome
18:00 CEST (UTC+02:00)	Taddei 14'; Vučinić 17'; De Rossi (yellow card) 63', (goal) 80' (pen.); Mancini (yellow card) 85'	Report	Bovo (yellow card) 51'; Rossi 58'; De León 59', (yellow card) 60'; Fabiano (yellow card) 78'; Borriello (yellow card) 79'	Stadium: Stadio Olimpico; Attendance: 36,366; Referee: Luca Banti

13 April 2008 33	Udinese	1–3	Roma	Udine
15:00 CEST (UTC+02:00)	Dossena (yellow card) 14'; Pepe (yellow card) 45'; Di Natale 52'	Report	Totti (yellow card) 53'; Vučinić 64'; Taddei 71', (yellow card) 88'; Giuly 90'	Stadium: Stadio Friuli; Attendance: 20,405; Referee: Nicola Rizzoli

19 April 2008 34	Roma	1–1	Livorno	Rome
18:00 CEST (UTC+02:00)	Mexès (yellow card) 28'; Vučinić 54'; Juan (yellow card) 82'	Report	Melara (yellow card) 20'; De Vezze (yellow card) 69'; Diamanti 83'	Stadium: Stadio Olimpico; Attendance: 34,061; Referee: Daniele Orsato

27 April 2008 35	Roma	4–1	Torino	Rome
15:00 CEST (UTC+02:00)	Pizarro 18' (pen.), (yellow card) 22'; Vučinić 20'; Mancini 26', 32'; Juan (red card) 76'	Report	Stellone (yellow card) 22'; Lazetić (yellow card) 40'; Ventola 50', (yellow card) 90+5'; Di Loreto (yellow card) 56'; Dellafiore (yellow card) 62'	Stadium: Stadio Olimpico; Attendance: 34,001; Referee: Domenico Celi

4 May 2008 36	Sampdoria	0–3	Roma	Genoa
15:00 CEST (UTC+02:00)		Report	Panucci 75'; Pizarro 78'; Cicinho 85'	Stadium: Stadio Luigi Ferraris; Attendance: 24,311; Referee: Massimiliano Saccani

11 May 2008 37	Roma	2–1	Atalanta	Rome
15:00 CEST (UTC+02:00)	Panucci 23'; De Rossi 67'	Report	Talamonti (yellow card) 25'; Pellegrino (yellow card) 30'; De Ascentis (yellow card) 52'; Bellini (yellow card) 60', (goal) 88'	Stadium: Stadio Olimpico; Attendance: 36,416; Referee: Luca Banti

18 May 2008 38	Catania	1–1	Roma	Catania
15:00 CEST (UTC+02:00)	Terlizzi (yellow card) 14'; Baiocco (yellow card) 44'; Martínez 85'	Report	Vučinić 8', (yellow card) 15'; Panucci (yellow card) 28'	Stadium: Stadio Angelo Massimino; Attendance: 21,148; Referee: Massimiliano Saccani

=== Coppa Italia ===
==== Round of 16 ====
19 December 2007 First leg	Torino	3–1	Roma	Turin
19:30 CET (UTC+01:00)	Recoba 12', 50'; Comotto 88'		Mancini 45+1'	Stadium: Stadio Olimpico di Torino; Attendance: 5,462; Referee: Oscar Girardi

16 January 2008 Second leg	Roma	4–0 (5–3 agg.)	Torino	Rome
20:45 CET (UTC+01:00)	Mancini 60'; Totti 62', 73' (pen.); Giuly 90'			Stadium: Stadio Olimpico; Attendance: 20,000; Referee: Paolo Dondarini

==== Quarter-finals ====
23 January 2008 First leg	Sampdoria	1–1	Roma	Genoa
18:30 CET (UTC+01:00)	Ziegler 62'		Vučinić 69'	Stadium: Stadio Luigi Ferraris; Attendance: 15,000; Referee: Emidio Morganti

29 January 2008 Second leg	Roma	1–0 (2–1 agg.)	Sampdoria	Rome
21:00 CET (UTC+01:00)	Mancini 60'			Stadium: Stadio Olimpico; Attendance: 24,715; Referee: Nicola Ayroldi

==== Semi-finals ====
16 April 2008 First leg	Roma	1–0	Catania	Rome
18:00 CEST (UTC+02:00)	Totti 46'			Stadium: Stadio Olimpico; Attendance: 15,000; Referee: Nicola Ayroldi

8 May 2008 Second leg	Catania	1–1 (1–2 agg.)	Roma	Catania
21:00 CEST (UTC+02:00)	Silvestri 29'		Aquilani 26' (pen.)	Stadium: Stadio Angelo Massimino; Attendance: 15,000; Referee: Emidio Morganti

==== Final ====
24 May 2008 Final	Roma	2–1	Internazionale	Rome
21:00 CEST (UTC+02:00)	Mexès 36'; Perrotta 55'		Pelé 61'	Stadium: Stadio Olimpico; Attendance: 60,000; Referee: Emidio Morganti

=== UEFA Champions League ===
==== Group stage ====
Pos	Team	Pld	W	D	L	GF	GA	GD	Pts	Qualification
1	(England) Manchester United	6	5	1	0	13	4	+9	16	Advance to knockout stage
2	(Italy) Roma	6	3	2	1	11	6	+5	11	Advance to knockout stage
3	(Portugal) Sporting CP	6	2	1	3	9	8	+1	7	Transfer to UEFA Cup
4	(Ukraine) Dynamo Kyiv	6	0	0	6	4	19	−15	0	

Source: RSSSF

19 September 2007 1	Roma (Italy)	2–0	(Ukraine) Dynamo Kyiv	Rome, Italy
20:45 CEST (UTC+02:00)	Perrotta 9'; Tonetto (yellow card) 65'; Totti 70'	Report	Yussuf (yellow card) 29'	Stadium: Stadio Olimpico; Attendance: 35,552; Referee: Alain Hamer (Luxembourg)

2 October 2007 2	Manchester United (England)	1–0	(Italy) Roma	Manchester, England
20:45 CEST (UTC+02:00)	Rooney 70'	Report	Mexès (yellow card) 39'	Stadium: Old Trafford; Attendance: 73,652; Referee: Manuel Mejuto González (Spain)

23 October 2007 3	Roma (Italy)	2–1	(Portugal) Sporting CP	Rome, Italy
20:45 CEST (UTC+02:00)	Juan 15', (yellow card) 90'; Cassetti (yellow card) 44'; Vučinić 70', (yellow card) 70'	Report	Liédson 18'; Tonel (yellow card) 46'; Moutinho (yellow card) 87'	Stadium: Stadio Olimpico; Attendance: 26,893; Referee: Terje Hauge (Norway)

7 November 2007 4	Sporting CP (Portugal)	2–2	(Italy) Roma	Lisbon, Portugal
20:45 CET (UTC+01:00)	Liédson 22', 64'; Abel (yellow card) 58'; Veloso (yellow card) 81'	Report	Cassetti 4', (yellow card) 52'; Cicinho (yellow card) 29'; Vučinić (yellow card) 44'; Perrotta (yellow card) 67'; Polga 90' (o.g.)	Stadium: Estádio José Alvalade; Attendance: 32,273; Referee: Frank De Bleeckere (Belgium)

27 November 2007 5	Dynamo Kyiv (Ukraine)	1–4	(Italy) Roma	Kyiv, Ukraine
20:45 CET (UTC+01:00)	Bangoura 63'; Vashchuk (yellow card) 72'	Report	Panucci 4'; Giuly 32'; Vučinić 36', 78'; Cassetti (yellow card) 89'	Stadium: Olimpiyskiy NSC; Attendance: 18,000; Referee: Wolfgang Stark (Germany)

12 December 2007 6	Roma (Italy)	1–1	(England) Manchester United	Rome, Italy
20:45 CET (UTC+01:00)	Barusso (yellow card) 49'; Mancini 71'	Report	Piqué 34'	Stadium: Stadio Olimpico; Attendance: 29,490; Referee: Martin Hansson (Sweden)

==== Knockout phase ====
===== Round of 16 =====
19 February 2008 First leg	Roma (Italy)	2–1	(Spain) Real Madrid	Rome, Italy
20:45 CET (UTC+01:00)	Pizarro 24'; De Rossi (yellow card) 42'; Mancini 58'; Perrotta (yellow card) 68'; Cassetti (yellow card) 90+1'	Report	Raúl 8'; Diarra (yellow card) 23'; Torres (yellow card) 64'; Ramos (yellow card) 69'	Stadium: Stadio Olimpico; Attendance: 59,617; Referee: Herbert Fandel (Germany)

5 March 2008 Second leg	Real Madrid (Spain)	1–2 (2–4 agg.)	(Italy) Roma	Madrid, Spain
20:45 CET (UTC+01:00)	Heinze (yellow card) 14'; Pepe (yellow card) 41' (yellow-red card) 71'; Raúl 75'; Robinho (yellow card) 76'; Guti (yellow card) 81'	Report	Taddei (yellow card) 20', (goal) 73'; De Rossi (yellow card) 35'; Perrotta (yellow card) 55'; Cicinho (yellow card) 67'; Aquilani (yellow card) 83'; Tonetto (yellow card) 84'; Vučinić 90+2'	Stadium: Santiago Bernabéu; Attendance: 71,569; Referee: Kyros Vassaras (Greece)

===== Quarter-finals =====
1 April 2008 First leg	Roma (Italy)	0–2	(England) Manchester United	Rome, Italy
20:45 CEST (UTC+02:00)	Pizarro (yellow card) 45+3'; Mexès (yellow card) 53'	Report	Ronaldo 39'; Anderson (yellow card) 45+2'; Rooney 66'	Stadium: Stadio Olimpico; Attendance: 80,023; Referee: Frank De Bleeckere (Belgium)

9 April 2008 Second leg	Manchester United (England)	1–0 (3–0 agg.)	(Italy) Roma	Manchester, England
20:45 CEST (UTC+02:00)	Tevez 70'	Report	Perrotta (yellow card) 73'	Stadium: Old Trafford; Attendance: 74,423; Referee: Tom Henning Øvrebø (Norway)

== Statistics ==
=== Appearances and goals ===
No.	Pos	Nat	Player	Total		Serie A		Supercoppa Italiana		Coppa Italia		Champions League	
No.	Pos	Nat	Player	Apps	Goals	Apps	Goals	Apps	Goals	Apps	Goals	Apps	Goals
32	GK	(Brazil) BRA	Doni	50	0	37	0	1	0	2+1	0	9	0
2	DF	(Italy) ITA	Christian Panucci	39	6	21+6	5	1	0	4+1	0	5+1	1
5	DF	(France) FRA	Philippe Mexès	45	2	30+1	1	1	0	4	1	9	0
77	DF	(Italy) ITA	Marco Cassetti	41	1	21+6	0	1	0	5+1	0	7	1
22	DF	(Italy) ITA	Max Tonetto	52	1	34+2	1	1	0	4+3	0	6+2	0
7	MF	(Chile) CHI	David Pizarro	46	4	28+3	3	0	0	2+3	0	7+3	1
16	MF	(Italy) ITA	Daniele De Rossi	51	6	34	5	1	1	6	0	9+1	0
20	MF	(Italy) ITA	Simone Perrotta	41	7	25+4	5	0	0	5+1	1	6	1
30	MF	(Brazil) BRA	Mancini	46	13	27+4	8	0	0	5+1	3	9	2
9	FW	(Montenegro) MNE	Mirko Vučinić	48	14	24+9	9	1	0	5+1	1	4+4	4
10	FW	(Italy) ITA	Francesco Totti	35	18	25	14	1	0	2+1	3	6	1
1	GK	(Italy) ITA	Gianluca Curci	8	0	1+1	0	0	0	5	0	1	0
11	MF	(Brazil) BRA	Rodrigo Taddei	35	7	25+1	6	1	0	2	0	6	1
4	DF	(Brazil) BRA	Juan	32	3	19+3	2	0	0	2	0	8	1
3	DF	(Brazil) BRA	Cicinho	43	2	18+12	2	0	0	5+1	0	4+3	0
14	MF	(France) FRA	Ludovic Giuly	48	8	17+15	6	1	0	5+1	1	5+4	1
21	DF	(Italy) ITA	Matteo Ferrari	23	0	16	0	0	0	2	0	2+3	0
8	MF	(Italy) ITA	Alberto Aquilani	31	4	11+10	3	1	0	4	1	4+1	0
33	MF	(Italy) ITA	Matteo Brighi	31	1	6+18	1	0+1	0	3+1	0	0+2	0
18	FW	(Italy) ITA	Mauro Esposito	16	0	0+8	0	0	0	1+1	0	1+5	0
15	DF	(Portugal) POR	Vitorino Antunes	9	0	0+5	0	0	0	3	0	1	0
25	GK	(Italy) ITA	Carlo Zotti	0	0	0	0	0	0	0	0	0	0
27	GK	(Brazil) BRA	Júlio Sérgio	0	0	0	0	0	0	0	0	0	0
26	MF	(Romania) ROU	Adrian Piț	1	0	0	0	0	0	1	0	0	0
36	FW	(Italy) ITA	Claudio Della Penna	1	0	0	0	0	0	0+1	0	0	0
Players transferred out during the season
17	MF	(Honduras) HON	Édgar Álvarez	1	0	0+1	0	0	0	0	0	0	0
28	DF	(Italy) ITA	Aleandro Rosi	1	0	0	0	0+1	0	0	0	0	0
29	MF	(Ghana) GHA	Ahmed Barusso	4	0	0+3	0	0	0	0	0	0+1	0

Last updated: 24 May 2008
Source: Competitions

=== Goalscorers ===
Rank	No.	Pos	Nat	Name	Serie A	Supercoppa	Coppa Italia	UEFA CL	Total
1	10	FW	(Italy)	Francesco Totti	14	0	3	1	18
2	9	FW	(Montenegro)	Mirko Vučinić	9	0	1	4	14
3	30	MF	(Brazil)	Mancini	8	0	3	2	13
4	14	MF	(France)	Ludovic Giuly	6	0	1	1	8
5	11	MF	(Brazil)	Rodrigo Taddei	6	0	0	1	7
5	20	MF	(Italy)	Simone Perrotta	5	0	1	1	7
7	2	DF	(Italy)	Christian Panucci	5	0	0	1	6
7	16	MF	(Italy)	Daniele De Rossi	5	1	0	0	6
9	7	MF	(Chile)	David Pizarro	3	0	0	1	4
9	8	MF	(Italy)	Alberto Aquilani	3	0	1	0	4
11	4	DF	(Brazil)	Juan	2	0	0	1	3
12	3	DF	(Brazil)	Cicinho	2	0	0	0	2
12	5	DF	(France)	Philippe Mexès	1	0	1	0	2
14	22	DF	(Italy)	Max Tonetto	1	0	0	0	1
14	33	MF	(Italy)	Matteo Brighi	1	0	0	0	1
14	77	DF	(Italy)	Marco Cassetti	0	0	0	1	1
Own goal					1	0	0	1	2
Totals					72	1	11	15	99

Last updated: 24 May 2008

=== Clean sheets ===
Rank	No.	Pos	Nat	Name	Serie A	Supercoppa	Coppa Italia	UEFA CL	Total
1	32	GK	(Brazil)	Doni	16	1	1	1	19
2	1	GK	(Italy)	Gianluca Curci	0	0	2	0	2
Totals					16	1	3	1	21

Last updated: 24 May 2008
