= History of AS Roma =

The history of Associazione Sportiva Roma begins with its founding on 7 June 1927 by Italo Foschi, who initiated the merger of three older Italian Football Championship clubs from the city of Rome; Roman, Alba-Audace and Fortitudo. Italo Foschi was a Roman representative of the National Fascist Party and the Secretary of the Roman Fascist Federation.

The purpose of the merger was to give the Eternal City a strong club to rival that of the more dominant Northern Italian clubs of the time. The only major Roman club to resist the merger was Lazio, which was already a well established sporting society.

The club played its earliest seasons at the Moto Velodromo Appio stadium before settling in the working-class streets of Testaccio, where it built the all-wooden ground Campo Testaccio; this was opened in November 1929. An early season in which Roma made a lasting mark on Italian football was in 1930–31, where the club finished as runners-up behind champions Juventus. Captain Attilio Ferraris IV, along with Guido Masetti, Fulvio Bernardini and Rodolfo Volk, were highly important players during this period.

== First title victory and decline ==
After a slump in league form and the departure of high key players, Roma eventually rebuilt their squad, adding goalscorers such as the Argentine Enrique Guaita. Under the management of Luigi Barbesino, the Roman club came close to their first title in 1935–36, finishing just one point behind champions Bologna. Roma returned to form after being inconsistent for much of the late 1930s, recording an unexpected title triumph in 1941–42 after winning their first ever scudetto. The 18 goals scored by local player Amedeo Amadei were essential to the Alfréd Schäffer-coached, title-winning Roma side. At the time, Italy was involved in World War II and Roma were playing their home matches at the Stadio del Partito Nazionale Fascista.

In the years just after the war, Roma were unable to recapture their league stature from the early 1940s. They finished in the lower half of Serie A for five consecutive seasons before eventually succumbing to their only ever relegation to Serie B at the end of 1950–51, around a decade after their championship victory. Under future Italy national team manager Giuseppe Viani, immediate promotion was achieved.

After returning to Serie A, Roma managed to stabilise themselves as a top-half club again with players such as Egisto Pandolfini, Dino Da Costa and the Dane Helge Bronée. Their best finish of this period was under the management of Englishman Jesse Carver, when in 1954–55 they finished as runners-up, after Udinese who originally finished second were relegated for corruption.

Although Roma were unable to break into the top four during the following decade, they did achieve some measure of cup success. Their first honour outside of Italy was recorded in 1960–61 when Roma won the Inter-Cities Fairs Cup by beating Birmingham City 4–2 in the finals. A few years later Roma won their first Coppa Italia in 1963–64 by beating Torino 1–0. Their second Coppa Italia was won in 1968–69 when it was competed in a small league like system. Giacomo Losi set a Roma appearance record during 1969 with 450 appearances in all competitions, a record that would stand for 38 years.

== Time of mixed fortunes ==
Roma were able to add another cup to their collection in 1972 after recording a 3–1 victory over Blackpool in the Anglo-Italian Cup. During much of the 1970s, Roma's appearance in the top half of Serie A was sporadic. The best place the club were able to achieve during the decade was third in 1974–75. Notable players who turned out for the club during this period included midfielders Giancarlo De Sisti and Francesco Rocca. The dawning of a newly successful era in Roma's footballing history was brought in with another Coppa Italia victory, they beat Torino on penalties to win the 1979–80 cup. Roma would reach heights in the league which they had not reached since the 1940s by narrowly and controversially finishing as runners-up to champions Juventus in 1980–81. Former Milan player Nils Liedholm was the manager at the time, with prominent players such as Bruno Conti, Agostino Di Bartolomei, Roberto Pruzzo and Paulo Roberto Falcão.

The second scudetto did not elude Roma for much longer; in 1982–83, the Roman club won the title for the first time in 41 years, amidst joyous celebrations in the capital. In the following season, Roma finished as runners-up in Italy and collected a Coppa Italia title, and as runners-up in the European Cup. The European Cup final with Liverpool ended in a 1–1 draw with a goal from Pruzzo, but Roma eventually lost the penalty shoot-out. Roma's successful run in the 1980s would finish with a runners-up spot in 1985–86 and a Coppa Italia victory, beating out Sampdoria 3–2.

After that, a comparative decline began in the league, one of the few league highs from the following period was a third place in 1987–88. At the start of the 1990s, the club was involved in an all-Italian UEFA Cup final, losing 2–1 to Internazionale in 1991. During the same season, the club won its seventh Coppa Italia and ended runners-up to Sampdoria in the Supercoppa Italiana. Aside from finishing runners-up to Torino in a Coppa Italia final, the rest of the decade was largely sub-par in the history of Roma, especially in the league, where the highest they could manage was fourth, in 1997–98.

== In the new millennium ==
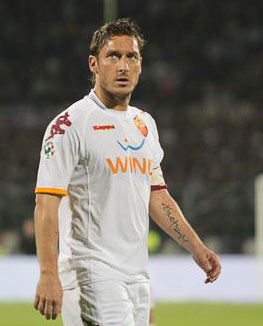
Former captain of Roma; Francesco Totti.

Roma returned to form in the 2000s, signing flagship striker Gabriel Batistuta for 70 billion lire, Hidetoshi Nakata for 42 billion lire, Walter Samuel for 40.265 billion lire and Emerson for 35 billion lire in the 2000–01 season. At the same time, the club's shares were listed in the Borsa Italiana. They started the decade in great style by winning their third Serie A title in 2000–01; the scudetto was won on the last day of the season, with Roma edging out Juventus by two points in the league table thanks to a 3–1 victory over Parma. Club captain Francesco Totti was a large reason for the title victory and he would become one of the main heroes in the club's history, going on to break several club records. Other important players during this period included Aldair, Cafu, Batistuta and Vincenzo Montella. Additionally, Antonio Cassano was signed after the season for 60 billion lire.

The club's attempt to defend the title in the following season saw them finish as runners-up in Serie A to Juventus by a single point. This would be the start of Roma finishing as runners-up several times in both Serie A and the Coppa Italia during the 2000s; they lost out 4–2 to Milan in the Coppa Italia final of 2003 and lost out to Milan again by finishing second in Serie A for the 2003–04 season.

Financial difficulties began to surface in the 2002–03 season. Batistuta was loaned to Inter mid-season to save money on his high wages and Cafu was released in June. In 2003–04, the signing of Cristian Chivu (who had originally agreed to sign in July 2003) was only completed in September 2003 with the aid of guarantees from other companies, and a sum of €30 million had to be deposited with the Italian Football Federation (FIGC) as guarantee money in order to register for the 2003–04 season after the original guarantor SBC Spa came under investigation for falsifying documents. During the season, Franco Sensi reconstructed the structure of ownership and raised the capital. In November 2003, €37.5 million was injected by "Roma 2000" (the holding company, a subsidiary of Italpetroli, Sensi's flagship) to cover the half year loss and loss carried from the 2002–03 season. and again on 30 June 2004 for €44.57 million. Through the stock market, a further €19.850 million of new shares were issued, and at the year end, the share capital was €19.878 million, which was unchanged as of 2011.

In 2004–05, Roma sold Emerson and Walter Samuel for €53 million and acquired Matteo Brighi, Simone Perrotta, Matteo Ferrari and Philippe Mexès as replacements, totalling for €30.45 million. Moreover, the highly rated young striker Mido was signed as an investment, although he was sent out on loan in January to Tottenham Hotspur after a disappointing first half-season. The club also delayed the tax payment in order to improve the cash flow, but further scandal was exposed after Roma was investigated by judicial authorities for irregularities on player transfers. The club originally hired Cesare Prandelli but he resigned for family reasons prior to the start of the season, prompting Roma to appoint Rudi Völler, Luigi Delneri and Bruno Conti. Roma finished in eighth, their worst league position in recent seasons, but gained entry to the UEFA Cup as runners-up in the Coppa Italia.

In 2005–06, a transfer ban was placed on Roma owing to its signing of Philippe Mexès the previous season; although Roma signed him as a "free agent", he had an existing, binding contract with his former club in France, Auxerre. The ban, however, was temporarily lifted in August due to appeal process, and Roma was ultimately ordered to play Auxerre €7 million in compensation. That season, Luciano Spalletti was hired and began a reconstruction of the Roma squad. The club signed Rodrigo Taddei, Samuel Kuffour, Dimitrios Eleftheropoulos, Gianluca Comotto and Shabani Nonda on free transfers, and loaned in Houssine Kharja and Cesare Bovo. Meanwhile, troublesome duo Ivan Pelizzoli and Antonio Cassano were both released, the former in July to Reggina on a free transfer and the latter in January to Real Madrid for €5 million. Coach Spalletti explored the abilities of Mancini and Rodrigo Taddei in attack and Brazilian Doni as starting goalkeeper, and the team finished fifth in Serie A.

In the 2006 Serie A scandal, Roma were one of the teams not involved; after punishments were handed out, Roma was re-classified as runners-up for 2005–06, the same season in which they finished second in the Coppa Italia losing to Inter. The club began their campaign in the transfer windows by signing David Pizarro from Inter for €12 million, Mirko Vučinić and Marco Cassetti from Lecce for €19 million and €2.35 million respectively, and Max Tonetto from Sampdoria on a free transfer.

In the 2006–07 Champions League, Roma reached the quarter-finals before going out to Manchester United, and also finished second in Serie A, meaning that in the 2000s, Roma finished in the top two positions more than any other time in their history.

During the 2007–08 season, Roma sold many of its top players, including Cristian Chivu, who was sold to Inter for €16 million and replaced by Juan from Bayer Leverkusen (€6.3M) and Marco Andreolli from Inter (€6M). Furthermore, Roma purchased Mauro Esposito from Cagliari (€2.4M), Ludovic Giuly from Barcelona (€3.2M) and Cicinho from Real Madrid (€9M + 2M bonus) to reinforce its attack.

In 2008–09, Mancini was sold to Inter for €13 million while Ludovic Giuly, who had a disappointing debut season in Rome, was offloaded to Paris Saint-Germain for €2.5 million. Meanwhile, the club purchased Júlio Baptista from Real Madrid (€9M), Jérémy Ménez from Monaco (€10.5M + 1.5M bonus) and defender John Arne Riise from Liverpool (€5M). Young Roma goalkeeper Gianluca Curci was also exchanged with Siena's Simone Loria and Artur. Despite the changes, however, Roma once again slipped to sixth in Serie A largely due to its poor defense, despite the club signing defender Marco Motta from Udinese mid-season during the winter transfer window. An injury to starting goalkeeper Doni also hindered Roma's backline, forcing Artur to play as first-choice instead.

In 2009–10, highly rated midfielder Alberto Aquilani was sold to Liverpool for €20 million, although no major signings arrived until centre-back Nicolás Burdisso joined on loan from Inter. Doni, the club's original starting goalkeeper, was replaced as first-choice by backup Júlio Sérgio, who played well. Additionally, the central defensive pair of Burdisso and Juan bolstered Roma, then under head coach Claudio Ranieri.

=== End of the Sensi era ===
In the late 2000s, A.S. Roma faced significant financial challenges under the ownership of the Sensi family. Compagnia Italpetroli, the Sensi family's holding company, had accumulated substantial debts, leading to a debt-for-equity swap in 2010 that granted UniCredit bank a 49% stake in Italpetroli. As the Sensi family struggled to service these debts, UniCredit assumed control of A.S. Roma and initiated a search for new investors.

On 31 January 2011, UniCredit received five bids for the club. During the January 2011 transfer window, the club refrained from significant spending, opting instead to offload high-salary players such as Júlio Baptista, who was sold to Málaga, and Cicinho, who was loaned to Villarreal.

On 16 April 2011, a preliminary agreement was signed for the sale of the club. An American consortium led by Thomas R. DiBenedetto, operating through AS Roma LLC, agreed to acquire a 67.1% stake in A.S. Roma S.p.A., along with full ownership of ASR Real Estate S.r.l. and Brand Management S.r.l., from Roma 2000 S.r.l., a subsidiary of Italpetroli. The total transaction was valued at €70.3 million. The new holding company, NEEP Roma Holding S.p.A., was established as a joint venture between AS Roma LLC (60%) and UniCredit (40%).

The transaction was finalized on 18 August 2011, marking the first time a Serie A club came under foreign majority ownership. The American investment group included James Pallotta, Michael Ruane, and Richard D'Amore. DiBenedetto became the 22nd president of the club on 27 September 2011, serving until 27 August 2012, when he was succeeded by Pallotta.

The new ownership aimed to stabilize the club's finances and improve its competitiveness both domestically and in European competitions. Plans were initiated to align the club with UEFA's Financial Fair Play regulations and to invest in player acquisitions and infrastructure development.
