= Brighi =

Brighi is an Italian surname. Notable people with the surname include:

- Marco Brighi (born 1983), Italian footballer, brother of Matteo
- Matteo Brighi (born 1981), Italian footballer
