= Lorenzo Burzigotti =

Italian footballer

Personal information
- Date of birth: 12 March 1987 (age 39)
- Place of birth: Sansepolcro, Italy
- Height: 1.90 m (6 ft 3 in)
- Position: Centre-back

Team information
- Current team: Sansepolcro

Youth career
- Sansepolcro
- 2004–2006: Arezzo

Senior career*
Years	Team	Apps	(Gls)
2006–2007	Arezzo	0	(0)
2006–2007	→ Sansovino (loan)	3	(0)
2007	→ Juve Stabia (loan)	6	(1)
2007–2008	South Tyrol	3	(0)
2008–2010	Foggia	42	(3)
2010–2014	Reggina	6	(0)
2012	→ Latina (loan)	11	(1)
2012–2013	→ Barletta (loan)	21	(3)
2013–2014	→ Grosseto (loan)	27	(1)
2014–2015	Grosseto	17	(1)
2015–2016	Messina	23	(2)
2016–2018	Gubbio	46	(3)
2018–2020	Arezzo	7	(1)
2020–	Sansepolcro	0	(0)
- * Club domestic league appearances and goals as of 11 August 2019

Lorenzo Burzigotti (born 12 March 1987) is an Italian footballer who plays for Sansepolcro.

== Biography ==
Born in Sansepolcro, the Province of Arezzo, Burzigotti started his career at Sansepolcro, then signed by Arezzo in mid-2004. In mid-2006 he graduated from the under-20 youth team and loaned to Sansovino. In January 2007 he was transferred to Juve Stabia but only played 9 times combined that season. On 31 August 2007 he was sold to South Tyrol in co-ownership deal. He only played 3 times in 2007–08 Serie C2. Arezzo gave up the remain 50% registration rights to South Tyrol. but failed to bought back Alessandro Simonetta. On 19 August, he was transferred to Foggia in 1-year deal after a successful trial. He played 10 times in 2008–09 Lega Pro Prima Divisione and signed a new 2-year deal at the end of season. He made a breakthrough in 2009–10, played 32 times, replacing departed Andrea Lisuzzo.

=== Reggina ===
On 13 July 2010 Burzigotti received a call-up from Reggina and the transfer completed soon after. However, he only played 7 times. Burzigotti took no.5 shirt from Vincenzo Camilleri at the start of season.

On 12 January 2012 he left on loan to U.S. Latina Calcio.

Burzigotti wore no.16 shirt for Reggina in 2012 pre-season, which his old number was taken by Gianluca Freddi in January 2012. On 30 August 2012 Burzigotti was signed by Barletta.

Burzigotti returned to Reggio Calabria again on 1 July 2013. He did not have any shirt number for Reggina in 2013–14 Serie B. On 2 September 2013 Burzigotti and Francesco Bombagi were signed by Grosseto, with Valerio Foglio moved to opposite direction.

=== Amateur levels ===
On 31 January 2020, he moved to the amateur side Sansepolcro.
