= Ahmed Barusso =

Ghanaian footballer (born 1984)

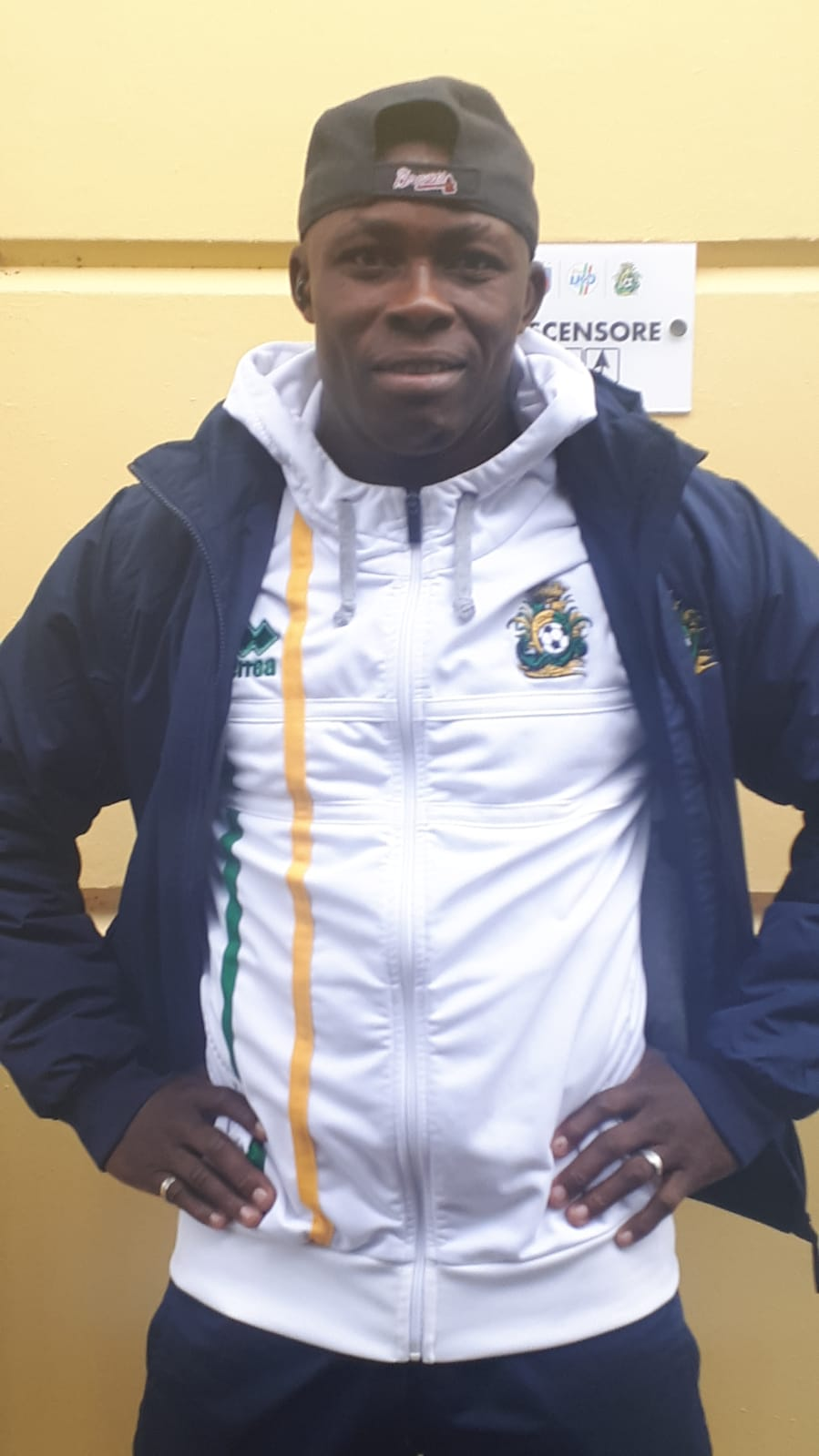
- Barusso in November 2019

Personal information
- Full name: Ahmed Apimah Barusso
- Date of birth: 26 December 1984 (age 41)
- Place of birth: Accra, Ghana
- Height: 1.85 m (6 ft 1 in)
- Position: Defensive midfielder

Team information
- Current team: Terme Monticelli

Youth career
- Nania

Senior career*
| Years | Team | Apps | (Gls) |
| 2003–2006 | Manfredonia | 61 | (9) |
| 2006–2007 | Rimini | 7 | (2) |
| 2007–2012 | Roma | 3 | (0) |
| 2008 | → Galatasaray (loan) | 2 | (1) |
| 2008–2009 | → Siena (loan) | 3 | (0) |
| 2009–2010 | → Brescia (loan) | 11 | (1) |
| 2010 | → Torino (loan) | 15 | (2) |
| 2010–2011 | → Livorno (loan) | 23 | (1) |
| 2012 | → Nocerina (loan) | 11 | (1) |
| 2012–2013 | Genoa | 0 | (0) |
| 2012–2013 | → Novara (loan) | 11 | (0) |
| 2014 | Torino | 0 | (0) |
| 2015 | Arezzo | 1 | (0) |
| 2017 | Virtus Camposanto | 5 | (2) |
| 2019–2020 | Colorno | 10 | (1) |
| 2020–2021 | Terme Monticelli | 3 | (0) |

International career
| 2007–2008 | Ghana | 6 | (1) |
- * Club domestic league appearances and goals as of 1 July 2015

Ahmed Apimah Barusso (born 26 December 1984) is a Ghanaian professional footballer who plays as a defensive midfielder for Italian club A.S.D. Terme Monticelli.

== Club career ==
Barusso started off his European footballing career at Manfredonia, where he moved after recommendations by Ghanaian football legend Abedi Pele, from Nania F.C. of Accra. He helped Manfredonia to three successive promotions from the Italian amateur leagues (Serie D) to Serie C1.

At the start of the 2006–07 season Barusso was signed by Serie B club Rimini in a co-ownership deal that was later turned permanent after his immediate impact at his new club, including man of the match performances against Juventus FC and Bologna F.C. 1909. Barusso's success was nearly halted, however, after a fractured tibia after a tackle by Alfredo Cardinale in the week 9 game at Crotone, forcing him to miss several games due to surgery.

=== Roma ===
On 15 June 2007, it was reported in the Italian media that A.S. Roma had secured the co-ownership signing of Barusso from Serie B side Rimini. The move was made official on 9 July 2007. It cost €1.7 million to sign him in co-ownership deal. He was awarded no.29 shirt., which was taken by Nicolás Burdisso in 2009–10 season.

Barusso made his Serie A debut for A.S. Roma in a 3–0 away win over Parma on 7 October 2007, at the Stadio Ennio Tardini.

Barusso was loaned to Turkish Galatasaray in January 2008, following the African Cup of Nations

He was subsequently loaned out to Serie A team Siena in June 2008, along with Gianluca Curci as part of the deal that Roma signed Simone Loria and Artur. At Siena, He struggled to find a place in the first team (3 appearances). He was call-up to Roma's pre-season retreat on 2 July 2009.

On 24 July 2009, as revealed by his agent Mauro Cavoli, Barusso signed Brescia of Serie B on loan from AS Roma for a season, which made official on 27 July.

On 31 January 2010, he was loaned to Torino where he met with Roma teammate Loria. Barusso almost won promotion back to Serie A with the club, which lost to Brescia in the final.

On 25 June 2010, Roma bought him outright for another €100,000. He spent the other half of the 2010–11 season on loan at Livorno.

On 21 July 2011, it was reported that Barusso may sign with Israeli champions Maccabi Haifa, but the deal never materialized. In August 2011, Barusso had his car attacked, along with teammate Stefano Okaka, by angry Roma fans due to his unwillingness to be traded, which would free up a spot for a non-EU player to be brought in.

=== Late career ===
On 23 August 2012, Barusso joined Genoa on a free transfer and next day, was moved out to Serie B side Novara Calcio in a temporary deal. The signing was solely for granting Genoa a quota of non-EU signing when releasing him on 30 June 2013 as a free agent.

On 30 January 2014, he returned to Torino. He was released on 30 June 2014 without any appearances. The club also received a quota to sign non-EU player Josef Martínez. In February 2015 Barusso was signed by Lega Pro club Arezzo.

== International career ==
Barusso was part of the Ghanaian Olympic Team, known as the Black Meteors that qualified for the 2004 Summer Olympic Games.

== Honours ==
Ghana

- African Cup of Nations third Place: 2008
