= Claudio Della Penna =

Italian footballer (born 1989)

Personal information
- Full name: Claudio Della Penna
- Date of birth: 12 May 1989 (age 37)
- Place of birth: Rome, Italy
- Height: 1.80 m (5 ft 11 in)
- Positions: Attacking midfielder; striker

Youth career
- 2001–2007: Roma

Senior career*
Years	Team	Apps	(Gls)
2007–2010	Roma	2	(0)
2008–2009	→ Pistoiese (loan)	20	(10)
2010	→ Gallipoli (loan)	25	(9)
2010–2012	Ternana	30	(12)

International career
2004–2005	Italy U–16	6	(2)
2005	Italy U–17	3	(2)
2006	Italy U–18	4	(1)
2008–2009	Italy U–20	14	(2)
- * Club domestic league appearances and goals as of 19 January 2012

Claudio Della Penna (born 12 May 1989 in Rome), is an Italian football striker.

== Career ==
He began to play in the youth system of AS Roma. He was in the team that finished runners-up in the Torneo di Viareggio 2007. He was among the youngest players in A.S Roma

He made his first appearance with the senior squad on 19 December 2007 in the Coppa Italia 2007–08 match lost against Torino F.C., when he substituted Adrian Piţ.

He spent the 2008–09 season on loan to Lega Pro Prima Divisione side Pistoiese.

After his return from Pistoiese, AS Roma decided not to include Della Penna in the first team, thus making him unavailable to play any competitive game at all, since he also cannot be featured any longer with the Primavera side due to age limits, and his contract is due to expire in June 2010. Despite this, he is still part of the Italian under-20 national team plans, and he was part of the azzurri roster for the 2009 FIFA U-20 World Cup.

In January 2010, He was loaned to Gallipoli Calcio from AS Roma; he agreed to a loan move to Serie B outfit Gallipoli for the remainder of the 2009–10 season.

On 31 August 2010, he moved to Lega Pro Prima Divisione side Ternana in a co-ownership deal.
