= Doni (footballer) =

Brazilian footballer (born 1979)

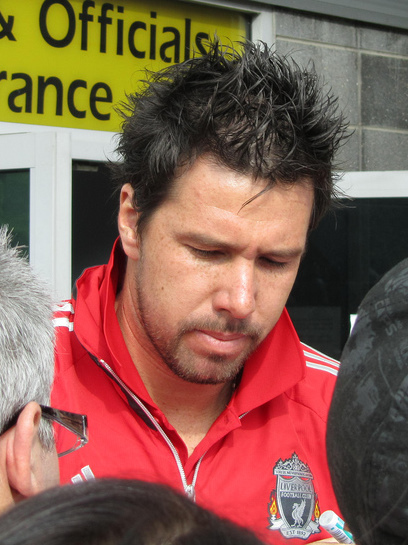
- Doni with Liverpool in 2011

Personal information
- Full name: Donieber Alexander Marangon
- Date of birth: 22 October 1979 (age 47)
- Place of birth: Jundiaí, Brazil
- Height: 1.94 m (6 ft 4 in)
- Position: Goalkeeper

Youth career
- 1999–2001: Botafogo-SP

Senior career*
Years	Team	Apps	(Gls)
2001	Botafogo-SP	0	(0)
2001–2003	Corinthians	59	(0)
2004	Santos	0	(0)
2004–2005	Cruzeiro	6	(0)
2005	Juventude	20	(0)
2005–2011	Roma	147	(0)
2011–2013	Liverpool	4	(0)
2013	Botafogo-SP	0	(0)
Total		236	(0)

International career
2007–2010	Brazil	10	(0)
Medal record
Men's football
Representing Brazil
Copa América
Winner	2007 Venezuela
- * Club domestic league appearances and goals

Donieber Alexander Marangon (born 22 October 1979), known as Doni, is a Brazilian former professional footballer who played as a goalkeeper.

Doni is the elder brother of João Paulo. Doni also holds an Italian passport. His parental family came from Veneto, and his grandmother came from Mantua.

== Club career ==
=== Roma ===
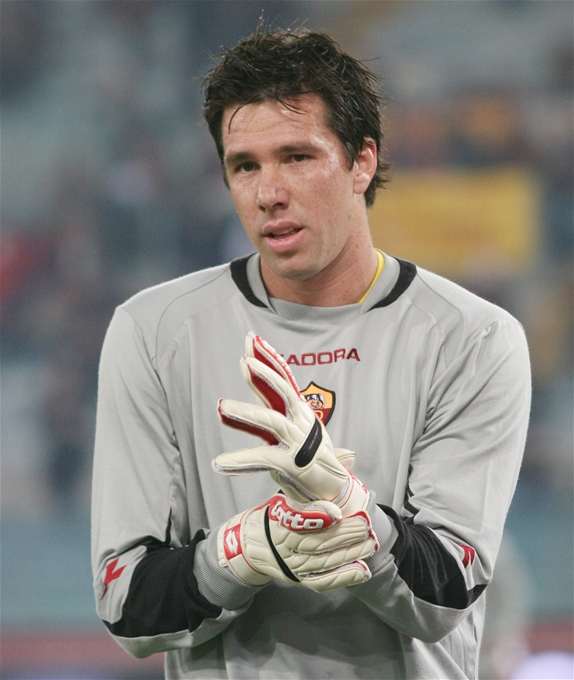
Doni playing for Roma in 2006

Doni joined Italian Serie A club Roma on 30 August 2005 from Juventude, after Roma paid his buy-out clause of approximately US$18,000. He signed a 1+3 year contract worth €300,000 in gross in the first year.

With Roma, Doni at first was blocked from first team action by Italian u-21 international Gianluca Curci and was restricted to UEFA Cup games. After impressing in Coppa Italia competition, however, he eventually replaced Curci in goal for Serie A games.

His contract was renewed on 13 April 2006, now worth €1.25 million a season (in gross). In his second season with Roma, he became one of the best goalkeepers of the Serie A. He won the Coppa Italia twice in 2007 and 2008, and also finished as the runner-up of Serie A in 2007 and 2008.

On 11 April 2007, Doni conceded seven goals in a UEFA Champions League tie against Manchester United, with the game ending 7–1. The following season, the two teams met again, but Doni was injured.

In May 2008, his contract was extended to June 2012. He would have earned a gross annual salary of about €4 million in average (from €3.8M in the first year to €4.3M in the last year)

In the second half of the 2008–09 season, he lost his place to Artur after a 1–4 loss to Juventus on 21 March. He continued for the next two matches to be named to the matchday squad but was not starting nor available for selection on the substitutes' bench. He then trained separately with injured players and visited the doctor for his knee in April 2009.

In the 2009–10 season, the club continued to use Artur and then Júlio Sérgio as first-choice goalkeeper, despite employing Claudio Ranieri to replace Luciano Spalletti. Doni was recovering from an injury. In October 2009, he returned to the team for the match against AC Milan on 18 October, but soon lost his place again to Júlio Sérgio.

After Vincenzo Montella replaced Ranieri as head coach in February 2011, Doni returned to the starting XI in the second match under Montella, a 2–2 draw with Parma on 27 February.

=== Liverpool ===
Doni signed for Premier League club Liverpool on 15 July 2011 on free transfer. He was expected to serve as second-choice goalkeeper behind Pepe Reina. As part of the deal, Roma paid Doni €1.5 million net of tax, roughly covering the wage difference between Roma and Liverpool's deal. Due to Reina's red card against Newcastle United in April 2012, Doni won a place in the starting lineup, becoming the first goalkeeper other than Reina to play in a Premier League match for Liverpool since Daniele Padelli on 13 May 2007.

Doni made his Premier League debut for Liverpool on 7 April 2012 in a 1–1 draw against Aston Villa at Anfield. In his next match, on 10 April, he received a red card and conceded a penalty against Blackburn Rovers. He subsequently received a suspension, missing the FA cup semi-final at Wembley v Everton as a consequence. Doni would play his second full competitive 90 minutes in a 1–0 defeat to Fulham at Anfield. Doni made his fourth league appearance on the final day of the season, a 1–0 defeat to Swansea City. In his first season at Anfield, Doni made a total of four appearances.

In the summer of 2012, new manager Brendan Rodgers allowed Doni to return to Brazil temporarily on personal leave. Although he was still included in Liverpool's squad for the 2012–13 season, Due to this personal leave he missed a chance to start while first choice goalkeeper Pepe Reina was injured; Brad Jones played instead.

It was finally announced, upon leaving Liverpool, that Doni had suffered a heart attack during a routine medical in the summer of 2012. Doni explained that he was unconscious for 25 seconds and almost died. He was advised by professionals to never play football again.

=== Botafogo ===
On 31 January 2013, Doni joined Brazilian team Botafogo-SP (the club he started his career with) from Liverpool after not featuring in the team's starting XI since the final day of the 2011–12 season. On 12 August 2013, he retired from playing football due to heart problems.

== International career ==
Doni earned his first cap with the Brazil national team against Turkey in Dortmund on 5 June 2007.

At the 2007 Copa América, he was selected as Brazil's first-choice goalkeeper moments before their first match against Mexico, replacing Helton. His play in the tournament included two penalty saves in penalty kicks against Uruguay in the semi-finals, which sent Brazil to the final. Brazil won the tournament with a 3–0 win over Argentina.

He was included in the preliminary squad for the 2008 Summer Olympics, but eventually did not get a place in the final list by coach Dunga.

He missed the 2009 FIFA Confederations Cup due to injury. In November 2009, he was called by Brazil for friendlies in the Middle East against England and Oman. Roma requested that he not come to these matches, but Doni challenged that decision and made himself available for the matches for the Brazilian squad. As a result, Roma benched him for the remainder of the Italian season, but coach Dunga appreciated his loyalty and, as a reward, kept his name in all subsequent callings.

In May 2010, he was named in Dunga’s final 23 man squad for the 2010 FIFA World Cup in South Africa.

He retired from international football on 1 February 2013 due to his previous cardiac problems.

== Career statistics ==
=== Club ===
Appearances and goals by club, season and competition
Club	Season	League			National Cup		Other		Continental		Total	
Club	Season	Division	Apps	Goals	Apps	Goals	Apps	Goals	Apps	Goals	Apps	Goals
Corinthians	2001	Série A	9	0	1	0	–		4	0	14	0
Corinthians	2002	Série A	24	0	6	0	–		6	0	36	0
Corinthians	2003	Série A	26	0	7	0	–		5	0	38	0
Corinthians	Total		59	0	14	0	–		15	0	88	0
Santos	2004	Série A	0	0	0	0	–		0	0	0	0
Cruzeiro	2004	Série A	6	0	4	0	–		7	0	17	0
Juventude	2005	Série A	20	0	4	0	–		5	0	29	0
Roma	2005–06	Serie A	28	0	4	0	–		4	0	36	0
Roma	2006–07	Serie A	32	0	3	0	–		10	0	45	0
Roma	2007–08	Serie A	37	0	1	0	–		9	0	47	0
Roma	2008–09	Serie A	29	0	1	0	–		8	0	38	0
Roma	2009–10	Serie A	7	0	3	0	–		4	0	14	0
Roma	2010–11	Serie A	16	0	1	0	–		2	0	19	0
Roma	Total		149	0	13	0	–		37	0	199	0
Liverpool	2011–12	Premier League	4	0	0	0	0	0	0	0	4	0
Liverpool	2012–13	Premier League	0	0	0	0	0	0	0	0	0	0
Liverpool	Total		4	0	0	0	0	0	0	0	4	0
Career total			238	0	35	0	0	0	64	0	336	0

== Honours ==
Corinthians

- Copa do Brasil: 2002

Roma

- Coppa Italia: 2006–07, 2007–08
- Supercoppa Italiana: 2007

Liverpool

- Football League Cup: 2011–12
- FA Cup runner-up: 2011–12

Brazil

- Copa América: 2007

Individual

- Copa América Best XI: 2007
