= João Paulo (footballer, born March 1989) =

Brazilian former footballer

Personal information
- Full name: João Paulo Fernando Marangon
- Date of birth: 17 March 1989 (age 37)
- Place of birth: Morungaba, São Paulo, Brazil
- Height: 1.85 m (6 ft 1 in)
- Position: Midfielder

Team information
- Current team: Gallipoli Calcio

Youth career
- 2007: Ituano
- 2007–2008: A.S. Roma

Senior career*
Years	Team	Apps	(Gls)
2008–2010	A.S. Roma		
2008–2009	→ Virtus Lanciano (loan)	1	(0)
2009	→ Vibonese (loan)	6	(0)
2010	→ Igea Virtus (loan)	5	(0)
2012	Brasil de Farroupilha		
2012	Gil Vicente		
2013	Esportivo		
2013	Miami United FC		
2013-2014	Sulmona Calcio	3	(1)
2014	Isernia F.C.	11	(1)
2015	Gallipoli Calcio	-	(-)
- * Club domestic league appearances and goals

João Paulo Fernando Marangon (born 17 March 1989) is a Brazilian retired footballer who primarily played as a right midfielder, predominantly for several Italian teams.

== Career ==
Marangon signed a contract with A.S. Roma after his 18th birthday, as his international transfer and contract period were no longer restricted by FIFA protection. In the 2008–09 season he briefly played in the Lega Pro Prima Divisione and Lega Pro Seconda Divisione. In February 2010, he was loaned to Igea Virtus.

He returned to his home country of Brazil in 2012 to play for Brasil de Farroupilha but shortly after moved to Gil Vicente FC. In 2013, he played for Esportivo Sulmona Calcio, and Miami United FC before returning to Italy to join Isernia in 2014. He retired in 2016 following his trade to Gallipoli Calcio and has worked as a scouting agent since. He is based in Rome but primarily scouts Brazilian players.

== Personal life ==
Marangon is the younger brother of former goalkeeper Doni (Doniéber Alexander Marangon).

On 20 May 2014 João Marangon was announced as a club executive for Miami Dade FC.
