= Gianluca Freddi =

Italian footballer

Personal information
- Date of birth: 29 March 1987 (age 39)
- Place of birth: Rome, Italy
- Height: 1.85 m (6 ft 1 in)
- Position: Defender

Team information
- Current team: Robur Siena

Youth career
- Roma

Senior career*
Years	Team	Apps	(Gls)
2006–2007	Roma	1	(0)
2007–2012	Grosseto	96	(9)
2012–2013	Reggina	32	(2)
2013–2014	Brescia	16	(0)
2014–2015	Novara	29	(4)
2015–2017	Lecce	20	(0)
2017–	Robur Siena		

International career
2003	Italy U-16	3	(0)
2004	Italy U-17	3	(1)
2004–2005	Italy U-18	6	(0)
2005–2006	Italy U-19	6	(0)
2005–2006	Italy U-20	2	(0)
- * Club domestic league appearances and goals as of 1 February 2017

Gianluca Freddi (born 29 March 1989) is an Italian footballer playing as a defender for Robur Siena.

== Biography ==
A product of the A.S. Roma youth academy, Freddi usually plays as defender. Freddi made his debut against U.C. Sampdoria as a starter, in a goalless draw on 22 April 2006.

In August 2007, he was sold to Grosseto in co-ownership bid, for a peppercorn fee of €500. In June 2008 Grosseto bought Freddi outright for around €65,000. (Note: AS Roma listed the financial income from the co-ownership in a lump sum of €815,000, including Galloppa (€650,000) and Tulli (€100,000). The residual was Freddi's fee.)

On 20 January 2012, he moved to Serie B side Reggina Calcio for an undisclosed fee after his four-and-a-half-year spell at Grosseto. He took no.5 shirt vacated by Lorenzo Burzigotti.

On 23 July 2013, he joined Brescia Calcio on a one-year deal with an option for a second year.

On 1 September 2014 Freddi joined Lega Pro club Novara Calcio in a 2-year contract. He won promotion to Serie B with club in 2015.

On 31 August 2015 he was sold to Lega Pro club U.S. Lecce, where he spent one and a half seasons.

On 31 January 2017 he moved to Robur Siena on a free transfer.
