= 2007 Supercoppa Italiana =

- Event: Supercoppa Italiana
| Inter Milan | Roma |
| Serie A | Coppa Italia |
| 0 | 1 |
- Date: 19 August 2007
- Venue: San Siro, Milan, Italy
- Referee: Roberto Rosetti
- Attendance: 34,898

The 2007 Supercoppa Italiana was a match contested by 2006–07 Serie A winners Inter Milan and 2006–07 Coppa Italia winners Roma.

The match took place on 19 August 2007 in San Siro, Milan, and resulted in a 1–0 victory for Roma. The goal was scored by Daniele De Rossi thanks to a penalty provoked by a foul of Nicolás Burdisso on Francesco Totti.

== Match details ==
19 August 2007
20:45 CEST

| Inter Milan | 0–1 | Roma |
|---|---|---|
| | (Report) | De Rossi 78' (pen.) |

San Siro, Milan
Attendance: 34,898
Referee: Roberto Rosetti

| Inter Milan | Roma |

INTER:
| GK | 12 | (Brazil) Júlio César |
| RB | 16 | (Argentina) Nicolás Burdisso | | (substituted off) 86' |
| CB | 2 | (Colombia) Iván Córdoba |
| CB | 23 | (Italy) Marco Materazzi | Yellow card |
| LB | 26 | (Romania) Cristian Chivu |
| CM | 14 | (France) Patrick Vieira | | (substituted off) 67' |
| CM | 15 | (France) Olivier Dacourt | | (substituted off) 52' |
| CM | 4 | (Argentina) Javier Zanetti (c) |
| AM | 5 | (Serbia) Dejan Stanković | Yellow card |
| CF | 29 | (Honduras) David Suazo |
| CF | 8 | (Sweden) Zlatan Ibrahimović | Yellow card |
Substitutes:
| GK | 1 | (Italy) Francesco Toldo |
| DF | 25 | (Argentina) Walter Samuel |
| DF | 6 | (Brazil) Maxwell |
| MF | 19 | (Argentina) Esteban Cambiasso | | (substituted on) 67' |
| MF | 7 | (Portugal) Luís Figo | | (substituted on) 52' |
| FW | 9 | (Argentina) Julio Cruz | | (substituted on) 86' |
| FW | 18 | (Argentina) Hernán Crespo |
Manager:
(Italy) Roberto Mancini

ROMA:
| GK | 32 | (Brazil) Doni | Yellow card |
| RB | 77 | (Italy) Marco Cassetti |
| CB | 2 | (Italy) Christian Panucci | Yellow card |
| CB | 5 | (France) Philippe Mexès | Yellow card |
| LB | 22 | (Italy) Max Tonetto | Yellow card |
| DM | 16 | (Italy) Daniele De Rossi |
| DM | 8 | (Italy) Alberto Aquilani |
| RW | 9 | (Montenegro) Mirko Vučinić | | (substituted off) 90' |
| AM | 14 | (France) Ludovic Giuly |
| LW | 11 | (Brazil) Rodrigo Taddei | | (substituted off) 73' |
| CF | 10 | (Italy) Francesco Totti (c) |
Substitutes:
| GK | 1 | (Italy) Gianluca Curci |
| DF | 13 | (Italy) Marco Andreolli |
| DF | 28 | (Italy) Aleandro Rosi | | (substituted on) 90' |
| MF | 33 | (Italy) Matteo Brighi | | (substituted on) 73' |
| MF | 20 | (Italy) Simone Perrotta | Red card |
| FW | 30 | (Brazil) Mancini |
| FW | 40 | (Democratic Republic of the Congo) Shabani Nonda |
Manager:
(Italy) Luciano Spalletti

MATCH OFFICIALS

- Assistant referees:
  - Griselli
  - Calcagno
- Fourth official:

MATCH RULES

- 90 minutes.
- 30 minutes of extra-time if necessary.
- Penalty shoot-out if scores still level.
- Seven named substitutes
- Maximum of 3 substitutions.

== See also ==
- 2007–08 Inter Milan season
- 2007–08 AS Roma season

Played between same clubs:

- 2006 Supercoppa Italiana
- 2008 Supercoppa Italiana
- 2010 Supercoppa Italiana
