= Keivan Zarineh =

Italian-Iranian footballer

Personal information
- Date of birth: 26 May 1985 (age 41)
- Place of birth: Rome, Italy
- Height: 1.93 m (6 ft 4 in)
- Position: Forward

Youth career
- 1999–2000: Tor di Quinto
- 2000–2003: Juventus

Senior career*
Years	Team	Apps	(Gls)
2003–2005	Juventus	0	(0)
2003–2004	→ Monterotondo (loan)	25	(4)
2004–2005	→ Ragusa (loan)	7	(0)
2005	→ Aprilia (loan)	15	(4)
2005–2007	Rieti	52	(9)
2007–2011	Roma	0	(0)
2007–2008	→ Cisco Roma (loan)	8	(1)
2008–2009	→ Valle del Giovenco (loan)	10	(3)
2009–2010	→ Paganese (loan)	35	(3)
2011	→ Latina (loan)	9	(0)
- * Club domestic league appearances and goals as of 2011-09-10

Keivan Zarineh (Persian: کیوان زرينه, born 26 May 1985) is a former Italian-Iranian professional footballer.

== Club career ==
Son of Iranian & Italian parents living in Rome, he started his career with Juventus' youth sector before being loaned to a number of minor Serie C2 and Serie D teams. In 2005, after his contract with Juventus expired, he signed for Serie C2 club Rieti.

After the club was relegated to Serie D in 2006–07, he was signed by A.S. Roma on a 4-year contract, which he stated to be his favourite team. On 9 August 2007, he was loaned to Serie C2 club Cisco Roma.

After played only eight games, with a single goal, he was loaned him to Lega Pro Seconda Divisione club Valle del Giovenco., with option to purchase. On 29 January 2009 he left Valle del Giovenco to accept another loan deal, this time at Lega Pro Prima Divisione club Paganese.

In 2012, he announced his retirement after having undergone two ankle operations, stating his difficulties in finding a professional contract as the main reason, and switched into a small job as a movie distribution officer.
