= Marco Cassetti =

Italian footballer (born 1977)

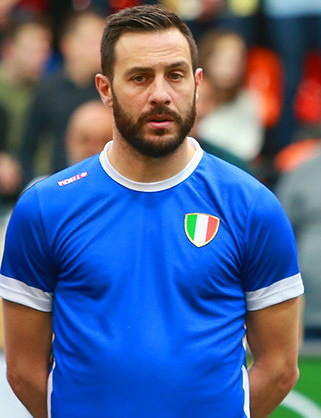
- Cassetti in 2018

Personal information
- Full name: Marco Cassetti
- Date of birth: 29 May 1977 (age 49)
- Place of birth: Brescia, Italy
- Height: 1.87 m (6 ft 2 in)
- Positions: Defender; midfielder

Senior career*
Years	Team	Apps	(Gls)
1996–1998	Montichiari	30	(6)
1998–2000	Lumezzane	50	(3)
2000–2003	Verona	61	(7)
2003–2006	Lecce	98	(9)
2006–2012	Roma	198	(5)
2012–2013	Udinese	0	(0)
2012–2013	→ Watford (loan)	38	(0)
2013–2014	Watford	38	(1)
2015–2016	Como	38	(1)
Total		551	(32)

International career
2005–2008	Italy	5	(0)

Managerial career
- 2023: Como (interim)
- * Club domestic league appearances and goals

Marco Cassetti (Italian pronunciation: [ˈmarko kasˈsetti]; born 29 May 1977) is an Italian former footballer who played as a defender.

Born in Brescia, he has previously played in Serie A for Verona, Lecce and Roma and in England with Watford. Cassetti won five caps for Italy at full international level. Principally a right-back, Cassetti started his career as a right midfielder. He has also played as a central defender.

== Club career ==
Cassetti started his football career at Montichiari, an amateur-level club inside the province of Brescia. In his two seasons with them, he made 30 appearances and scored six goals. He then moved on to a Serie C1 team, Lumezzane, where he also stayed for two years. His debut in the Serie A came with Hellas Verona FC in a 1–1 draw with Bari. He was often a sub in his first two years with them but became a starter the next year when they were relegated to the Serie B. After that, he was a typical starter for Lecce, playing with them for three seasons.

In the 2006–07 season, Cassetti left Lecce to sign a four-year contract with Roma on a co-ownership deal for €1.5M due to Lecce's relegation. His teammate Mirko Vučinić also joined on loan for €3.25M. In June 2007, the remain registration rights of Cassetti were bought for €851,500.

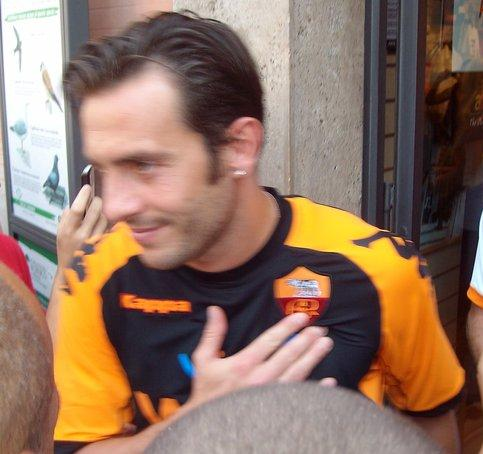
Cassetti with Roma

In December 2009, he scored a winner against Lazio. On that day he became a hero for all Roma fans. On 3 June 2010, he signed a new 1-year deal with Roma and his pre-tax salary was increased to €1.8M from €1.34M. His contract was renewed again in March 2011.

He then became a second choice as a right back, with Aleandro Rosi being favoured over him. He played only five matches in the first part of the 2011–12 season due to his injury; towards the end of the season, Cassetti stated that he experienced less playing time due to manager Luis Enrique considering him as more of a centre-back player rather than a right-back.

At the end of the 2011–12 season, it became clear that Roma decided against offering Cassetti a contract extension, meaning he would leave the capital club at the end of the season.

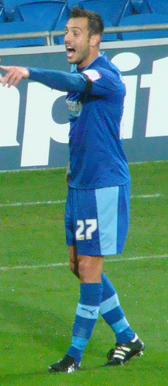
Cassetti playing for Watford

On 23 August 2012, Cassetti signed for Udinese on a one-year deal, agreeing to join Watford on a season-long loan on the same day. Udinese did not publicise their signing of Cassetti, meaning that it was a move purely for the benefit of the English Championship club. In June 2013, Cassetti signed for Watford permanently and scored his first goal for the club in a 3–3 draw at home to Blackburn Rovers on 25 March 2014.

After two years at Vicarage Road, Cassetti announced he would be leaving Watford upon the expiry of his contract in May 2014. Roma manager Rudi Garcia had allowed Cassetti to train with the club in September, and in January 2015, Cassetti agreed a deal to join Lega Pro side Como.

== International career ==
Cassetti has been capped for the Italy national team five times at senior level. He was the first Lecce player ever to play for the national team when he earned his first cap in 2005. He played his last game for Italy in a 2008 2–1 over Cyprus in 2010 FIFA World Cup qualification, under Marcello Lippi.

== Post-playing and coaching career ==
In September 2020, Cassetti successfully obtained his UEFA Pro coaching license.

Later in 2022, Cassetti agreed to rejoin Roma as a youth coach.

In December 2023, Cassetti served as an interim head coach for Como as Cesc Fàbregas's coaching authorization had expired and the appointment of new head coach Osian Roberts was not formally confirmed in time by the Football League; on his only game in charge, he guided Como to a 2–1 away win against Cosenza on 26 December 2023.

== Honours ==
Roma

- Coppa Italia (2): 2006–07, 2007–08; Runner-up: 2009–10
- Supercoppa Italiana: 2007; Runner-up: 2006, 2008, 2010
- Serie A Runner-up: 2006–07, 2007–08, 2009–10
