= Max Tonetto =

Italian footballer (born 1974)

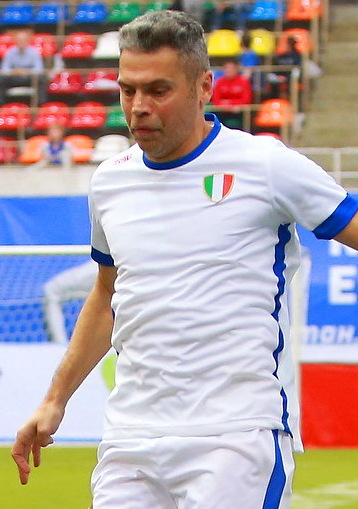
- Tonetto in 2018

Personal information
- Date of birth: 18 November 1974 (age 51)
- Place of birth: Trieste, Italy
- Height: 1.75 m (5 ft 9 in)
- Position: Midfielder

Senior career*
Years	Team	Apps	(Gls)
1991–1992	San Giovanni Trieste	13	(1)
1992–1997	Reggiana	38	(0)
1993–1994	→ Fano (loan)	30	(2)
1994–1995	→ Ravenna (loan)	28	(2)
1997–1999	Empoli	61	(4)
1999	Milan	0	(0)
2000	Bologna	12	(0)
2000–2004	Lecce	131	(2)
2004–2006	Sampdoria	66	(8)
2006–2010	Roma	84	(1)
Total		463	(20)

International career
2007	Italy	1	(0)
- * Club domestic league appearances and goals

Max Tonetto (Italian pronunciation: [ˈmaks toˈnetto]; born 18 November 1974) is an Italian retired footballer who played as a midfielder.

A versatile naturally left-footed player, his preferred position was on the left flank in midfield, although he was often used as a left-back, and could also play as a left wing-back. He played for several Italian clubs throughout his career, most notably Roma, where he won consecutive Coppa Italia titles in 2007 and 2008 during his four seasons with the team.

== Club career ==
Tonetto was born in Trieste. In 2000, Tonetto's career came to a shift when he moved to Lecce, where he became team captain in 2003.

From 2004 to 2006, he enjoyed great success at Serie A side Sampdoria, where he got his first taste of European football in the UEFA Cup. After the end of his contract with Sampdoria, he signed a two-year deal with Roma. He has played more than 300 Serie A games.

In his first season with Roma he showed good performances as a left-back. Although in his thirties, Tonetto is still, despite injuries, able to produce great and outstanding performances.

Tonetto scored his first goal for Roma during a match against Empoli in the 2007–08 season, by completing Francesco Totti's pass and scoring a wonderful goal.

In November 2007, he signed a new contract with Roma which would last until 30 June 2010.

On 11 March 2009, he blasted Roma's eighth and final penalty into the stands in the shootout against Arsenal, which meant Roma were knocked out of the Champions League, failing to progress to the quarter finals.

His contract with Roma expired 30 June 2010, and he subsequently retired from professional football.

== International career ==
Tonetto won his one and only cap for Italy against the Faroe Islands in a qualification match for UEFA Euro 2008.

== Honours ==
Roma

- Coppa Italia: 2006–07, 2007–08
- Supercoppa Italiana: 2007
