= Marco Brighi =

Italian footballer

Personal information
- Date of birth: 5 February 1983 (age 43)
- Place of birth: Rimini, Italy
- Height: 1.72 m (5 ft 8 in)
- Position: Midfielder

Team information
- Current team: S.P. La Fiorita
- Number: 4

Youth career
- 2000–2001: Rimini

Senior career*
Years	Team	Apps	(Gls)
2001–2002	Rimini	29	(1)
2002–2006	Juventus	0	(0)
2003	→ Lucchese (loan)	12	(0)
2004	→ Vis Pesaro (loan)	7	(0)
2004–2005	→ Bellaria (loan)	30	(0)
2005	→ Ivrea (loan)	8	(0)
2006	→ Bellaria (loan)	13	(0)
2006–2010	Bellaria	97	(4)
2010–2014	Rimini	95	(3)
2014–2015	Jesina Calcio		
2015–2016	Vis Pesaro		
2016–	La Fiorita		
- * Club domestic league appearances and goals as of 31 March 2014

Marco Brighi (born 5 February 1983) is an Italian footballer who plays for S.P. La Fiorita as a central midfielder.

== Career ==
After beginning his career with Rimini, Brighi was signed by Juventus in the summer of 2002. He was loaned to Serie C1 and Serie C2 clubs before being signed permanently by Bellaria Igea Marina.

In the 2010–11 season, Marco Brighi played for A.C. Rimini 1912. The team's predecessor, Rimini Calcio, didn't register the team for the new season in Serie Lega Pro Prima Divisione, and so the new team, refounded as A.C. Rimini 1912, restarted to play in the Serie D division. The club's new president, Biagio Amati, created the new team with players of high level, and Marco Brighi was chosen to be the captain of this team.

== Personal life ==
Marco is one of four brother's who all play football; his older brother, Matteo, is also a professional footballer.
