= Rodrigo Taddei =

Brazilian footballer (born 1980)

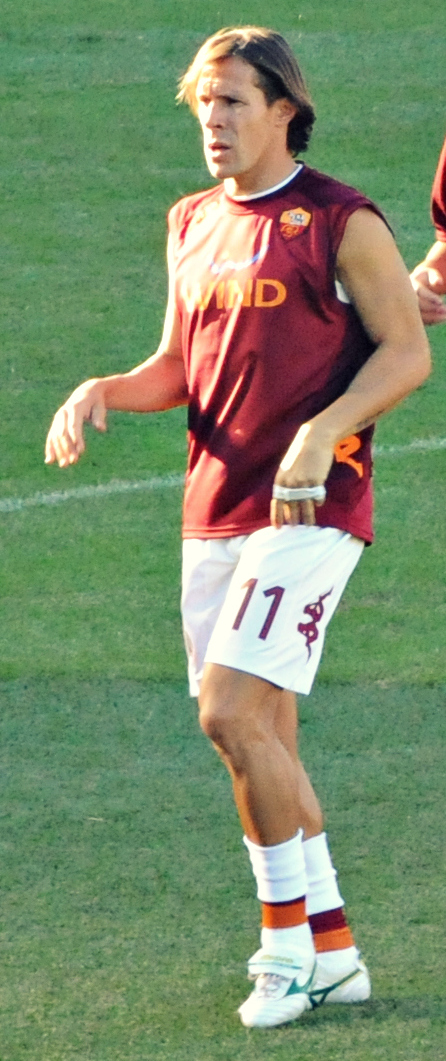
- Taddei training with Roma in 2012

Personal information
- Full name: Rodrigo Ferrante Taddei
- Date of birth: 6 March 1980 (age 46)
- Place of birth: São Paulo, Brazil
- Height: 1.77 m (5 ft 10 in)
- Positions: Winger; full back

Senior career*
Years	Team	Apps	(Gls)
1996–2002	Palmeiras	29	(2)
2002–2005	Siena	74	(14)
2005–2014	Roma	224	(25)
2014–2016	Perugia	40	(3)
Total		367	(44)
- * Club domestic league appearances and goals

Rodrigo Ferrante Taddei (born 6 March 1980) is a retired Brazilian-Italian footballer. Though primarily a midfielder, Taddei was notable for his versatility on the field. During his career he has played in every position except central defender. Once Taddei even played as a goalkeeper for Palmeiras, when the team's usual starting goalkeeper was sent off.

== Club career ==
=== Early career ===
He started his career in Brazil with Palmeiras, then moved to Italy in September 2002 and signing for Siena, a then Serie B team, which later earned promotion to Serie A.

After another season with Siena, Taddei left on a Bosman free transfer and signed a five-year contract with AS Roma on 3 June 2005. He earned a gross salary of €1.75M in the first season and €2.23M in the next 4 seasons.

=== Roma ===
After joining Roma prior to the 2005–06 season, Taddei made his debut on 28 August 2005 in a 3–0 win away to Reggina in Serie A. Taddei got his first taste of European football, helping Roma to the last 16 of the 2005–06 UEFA Cup, going out to Middlesbrough on away goals. Taddei ended his first season with 9 goals in 53 games in all competitions.

Taddei received some attention after he performed a move he later titled "The Aurelio", named after AS Roma assistant manager Aurelio Andreazzoli, in a Champions League group stage match against Olympiacos on 18 October 2006. On 23 December 2006, he scored an acrobatic goal in a 2–0 win over Cagliari.

On 4 April 2007, he scored the opening goal in Roma's 2–1 victory over Manchester United in the first leg of the 2006–07 UEFA Champions League quarter-finals. Taddei missed the second leg through injury, as Roma lost 7–1 at Old Trafford. The Brazilian ended the 2006–07 by winning his first trophy, helping Roma to the 2006–07 Coppa Italia, a trophy Roma would retain the following season, beating Internazionale on both occasions.

On 5 March 2008, he scored a goal in a 2–1 away win over Real Madrid in the 2007–08 UEFA Champions League round of 16, in which Roma qualified to play another quarter-final against Manchester United. On 21 February 2009, he scored a goal in a 1–0 win against his former club Siena.

On 7 June 2010, Roma announced that Taddei had signed a new 4-year contract in which he would earn a gross annual salary of €2.8M in the first three years and €1.9M in the last year.

27 January 2011, he scored in a 2–0 win over Juventus in the 2010–11 Coppa Italia quarter-finals. However, he scored one goal in 24 matches in 2011–12 season. In 2012–13 season, he continued to play as a full-back under Zdeněk Zeman. However, he finished the season with just 6 matches in all competitions.

New coach Rudi Garcia moved him back to midfield during the season 2013–2014 he scored 2 goals with a total of 20 appearances for Roma, his goal against Parma on 2 April 2014 was his first Roma goal since December 2011. Just two games later Taddei scored his final Roma goal, opening the scoring in the 3–1 victory over Atalanta. At the end of the season, the club and the Brazilian footballer didn't reach an agreement for a contract renewal and Taddei left Roma after 9 years, playing almost 300 games and scoring 31 times in all competitions.

=== Perugia ===
On 21 July 2014, after having been a free agent for two months, Taddei signed a contract with AC Perugia Calcio in Serie B. Taddei scored his first goal for Perugia in the 2–0 win against FeralpiSalò in the second round of the Coppa Italia. Taddei scored his first Serie B goal in the 2–2 draw with Vicenza on 20 September, keeping Perugia top of the Serie B table.

== International career ==
Taddei has never been capped by the Brazil national team but, thanks to his Italian citizenship, he is also eligible to play for Italy. He is in fact an Italian Brazilian, his great-grandparents were from Perugia and Turin. In February 2009, he publicly stated that he would accept a call from Marcello Lippi.

== Personal life ==
In late 2003, Taddei was seriously injured in a car accident. His younger brother Leonardo died in the accident and his teammate Pinga was also hurt. Upon recovery, Taddei returned to playing for Siena.

== Honours ==
Palmeiras

- Copa do Brasil: 1998
- Torneio Rio – São Paulo: 2000
- Copa dos Campeões: 2000
- Copa Libertadores runner-up: 2000
- Copa Mercosur runner-up: 2000

Siena

- Serie B: 2002–03

Roma

- Coppa Italia: 2006–07, 2007–08
- Supercoppa Italiana: 2007
