= Aleandro Rosi =

Italian footballer (born 1987)

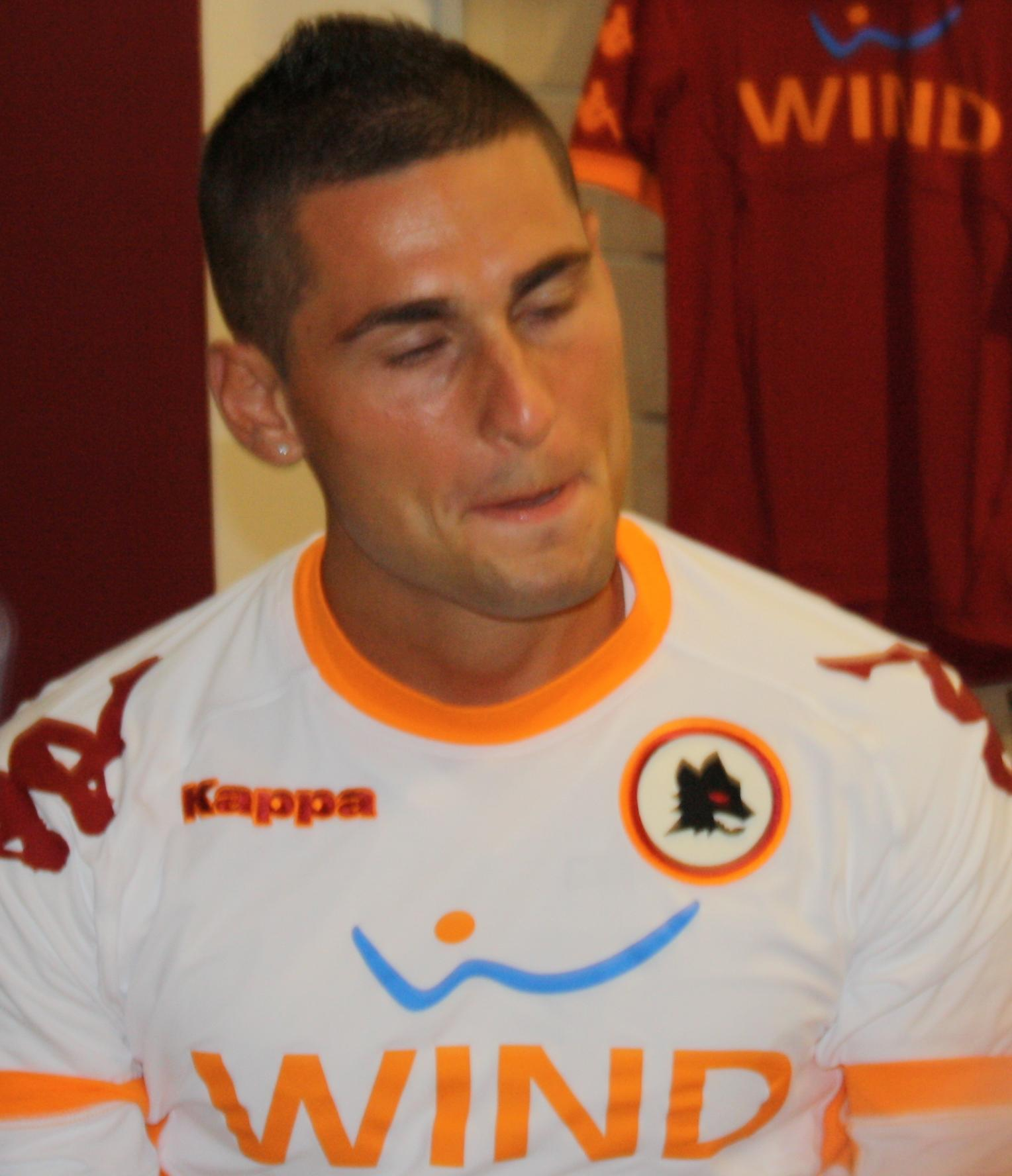
- Rosi with Roma

Personal information
- Date of birth: 17 May 1987 (age 39)
- Place of birth: Rome, Italy
- Height: 1.85 m (6 ft 1 in)
- Positions: Right back; right winger

Team information
- Current team: Torres
- Number: 2

Youth career
- 1997–1999: Lazio
- 1999–2004: Roma

Senior career*
Years	Team	Apps	(Gls)
2004–2012	Roma	74	(3)
2007–2008	→ Chievo (loan)	16	(0)
2008–2009	→ Livorno (loan)	37	(0)
2009–2010	→ Siena (loan)	28	(1)
2012–2014	Parma	37	(5)
2014	→ Sassuolo (loan)	7	(0)
2014–2018	Genoa	31	(0)
2015	→ Fiorentina (loan)	4	(0)
2015–2016	→ Frosinone (loan)	27	(0)
2016–2017	→ Crotone (loan)	31	(1)
2019–2023	Perugia	105	(5)
2024–	Torres	3	(0)

International career^{‡}
2003	Italy U-16	5	(0)
2004	Italy U-17	6	(0)
2004	Italy U-18	2	(0)
2005	Italy U-19	2	(0)
- * Club domestic league appearances and goals as of 4 May 2024 ‡ National team caps and goals as of 10 October 2006

Aleandro Rosi (born 17 May 1987) is an Italian professional footballer who plays for Serie C Group B club Torres. Known for his versatility, he plays as a full-back, a winger along the right flank, offensively and defensively, and for his pace.

== Club career ==
=== Youth career ===
Rosi was originally in the Lazio youth system but switched over to Roma when he was 12 years old. He signed with A.S. Roma his first professional contract on 1 July 2004.

=== Roma ===
Rosi made his Serie A debut on 28 May 2005, when Roma drew 0–0 with Chievo Verona. That was his only appearance in his first season with Roma. He then appeared in fifteen games during the 2005–06 season. He scored his first Serie A goal against Parma on 24 September 2006. Rosi made his Champions League debut on 18 October 2006 in a 1–0 away victory over Olympiacos. Rosi was also part of the A.S. Roma team that lost 7–1 against Manchester United in April 2007. His second goal was scored against Messina during the last home game of the 2006–07 season.

==== Loans & Co-ownership ====
After a relatively unsuccessful loan spell with Chievo in the 2007–08 season, Roma loaned him to Serie B club Livorno for the 2008–2009 season where he made 37 appearances.

In August 2009, Rosi joined Siena in a co-ownership deal. Rosi played a total of 28 games for Siena, scoring his first and only goal for Siena in a 3–2 win over Bari which proved to be the winner.

For the 2010–11 Serie A season, Rosi was loaned back to Roma. He scored a winner in the club's victory against Bari.

==== A.S. Roma Return ====
For the 2011–12 season, Rosi returned to Roma.

=== Parma ===
Unwilling to spend another season on loan, Rosi and Roma terminated his contract by mutual consent on 7 August 2012. Rosi signed a five-year contract with Parma on the same day.

=== Genoa ===
In summer 2014 Rosi was sold to Genoa for €3.825 million, with Dániel Tőzsér moved to Parma for €3 million.

=== Perugia ===
On 5 February 2019, Rosi signed to Perugia until 30 June 2021.

=== Torres ===
On 5 February 2024, Rosi signed with Torres in Serie C.

== International career ==
Rosi has represented Italy at different youth levels 15 times. Rosi made his last appearance in 2005 for the Italy under-19 football team. He was called to Italy under-21 football team in 2006.

== Honours ==
Roma

- Coppa Italia: 2006–07
- Supercoppa Italiana: 2007
