= Matteo Brighi =

Italian footballer (born 1981)

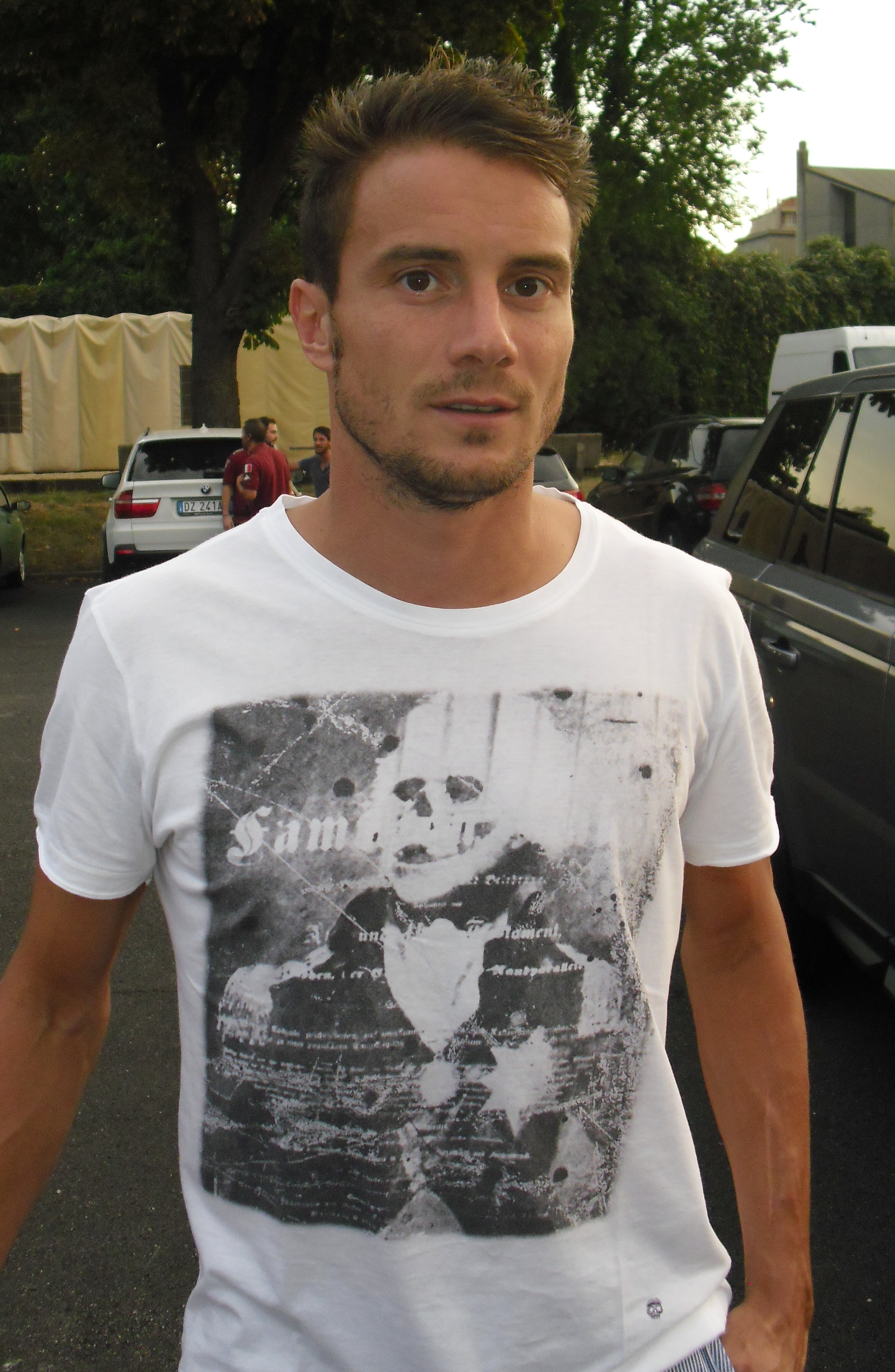
- Brighi in 2012

Personal information
- Date of birth: 14 February 1981 (age 45)
- Place of birth: Rimini, Italy
- Height: 1.78 m (5 ft 10 in)
- Position: Central midfielder

Youth career
- 1996–1998: Rimini

Senior career*
Years	Team	Apps	(Gls)
1998–1999	Rimini	10	(1)
1999–2002	Juventus	11	(0)
1999–2000	→ Rimini (loan)	34	(6)
2001–2002	→ Bologna (loan)	32	(0)
2002–2004	Parma	22	(1)
2003–2004	→ Brescia (loan)	29	(1)
2004–2013	Roma	108	(9)
2004–2007	→ Chievo (loan)	89	(9)
2011–2012	→ Atalanta (loan)	11	(0)
2012–2013	→ Torino (loan)	23	(2)
2013–2014	Torino	16	(2)
2014–2015	Sassuolo	31	(0)
2015–2016	Bologna	14	(0)
2016–2018	Perugia	50	(2)
2018–2019	Empoli	24	(2)
Total		504	(35)

International career
2000	Italy U18	3	(0)
2000–2001	Italy U20	5	(0)
2000–2004	Italy U21	35	(2)
2002–2009	Italy	4	(0)
Medal record
Men's football
Representing Italy
UEFA European Under-21 Championship
Winner	2004 Germany
- * Club domestic league appearances and goals as of 09:14, 3 June 2019 (UTC)

Matteo Brighi (Italian pronunciation: [matˈtɛːo ˈbriːɡi]; born 14 February 1981) is an Italian former professional footballer who played as a central midfielder. Regarded as one of Italy's most talented prospects in his early career, Brighi was named Serie A Young Footballer of the Year in 2002.

== Club career ==
=== Rimini ===
Brighi began his association football professional career at Rimini in Serie C2 in 1998. He did not appear for the football club during the 1997–98 season. The following season, he made ten league appearances, scoring one goal, as substitute. Brighi also played for the team in 1998–99 Coppa Italia Serie C, where he was a starter. In his next professional season with Rimini, Brighi scored 6 goals, in 34 league appearances. He also took part in the promotion playoffs of the season, scoring twice.

=== Juventus ===
In the summer of 2000, Brighi moved to Juventus. Although the club had initially purchased him in the summer of 1999 with the intent of having him play with the team's Primavera youth side before joining the first team, his signing was delayed by a year, as Brighi wanted to complete his high school diploma in accounting prior to moving to the club. Brighi made 11 league appearances and 12 in total for Juventus first team during the 2000–01 Serie A season under manager Carlo Ancelotti, despite still eligible to their Primavera under-20 side. Juventus ended the season in second place in Serie A.

In the summer of 2001, Brighi was sent on loan to Bologna for the 2001–02 Serie A. His excellent performances under manager Francesco Guidolin soon saw him break into the starting XI, and he earned a reputation as one of Italy's most promising midfielders, winning the Serie A Young Footballer of the Year Award in 2002. In total, he made 32 league appearances during the season.

=== Parma and Brescia ===
After his loan with Bologna ended, Brighi returned to Juventus in the summer of 2002. After Brighi won the 2002 Supercoppa Italiana with the Turin side, the club sold 50% of his registration rights to Parma as part of the deal which saw Marco Di Vaio join Juventus. The transfer was worth €5 million at the time. The 2002–03 Serie A was an unsuccessful season for Brighi, as it was marred by injuries which limited his playing time. He was later sent on loan to Brescia during the 2003–04 Serie A season, where he was able to recapture his form, making 29 appearances and scoring once.

=== Roma ===
==== Chievo loan ====
In 2004, Juventus repurchased Brighi's 50% registration rights for a €11.5 million fee, then sold the full registration rights of Brighi to Roma for €16 million as part of the deal which saw Emerson join Juve. Brighi signed a five-year contract worth €930,000 annually in gross. Brighi was then immediately sent on a one-season loan to ChievoVerona. That season, Roma also signed central midfielder Simone Perrotta from Chievo side. Chievo would receive prize money from Roma per appearances of Brighi, with each five appearances worth €80,000.

The loan was extended in summer 2005 and again in 2006. After the sanctions imposed on other clubs as a result of the Calciopoli scandal, Brighi played for Chievo at 2006–07 UEFA Champions League third qualifying round and twice at 2006–07 UEFA Cup first round. In his last season, he formed the midfield line with Paolo Sammarco and Franco Semioli for over 20 matches. Although Chievo were relegated to Serie B in June, their performance earned each of them a transfer to a different club. In total, Brighi made 68 appearances for Chievo, scoring 9 goals.

==== Return to Roma ====
In 2007, Brighi returned to Roma for the 2007–08 Serie A season. On 25 July 2008, he signed a new contract, keeping him at the club until June 2012. As such, his annual salary was increased: he earned €1.3 million in 2008–09, set to increase to €1.6 million in 2011–12. Brighi made an excellent start to the 2008–09 Serie A season with Roma. On 9 November 2008, the then Italy national team head coach Marcello Lippi, who worked with Brighi at Juventus, was quoted in Rome newspaper Il Romanista saying, "My memories of Brighi are optimal. From the human point of view he is a splendid boy, and from the technical point of view he is one of those diligent midfielders that every trainer would want to have. To my warning, at the beginning of his career, he was praised so excessively that too many expectations were created around him."

In a 20 November 2008 interview with La Repubblica, Brighi called then-Roma head coach Luciano Spalletti "the best I've ever had in terms of managing the group", adding that he already had "some great ones like [Francesco] Guidolin and [Cesare] Prandelli". Around the same time, he told Sky Italia, "I like to work, not talk. Other players talk and sell themselves, certainly better than I do. I don't blame them for it. It's just not me." In the same interview, he was asked who his favourite players were growing up and who he admires in football, "As a boy I loved Roberto Mancini when he was at Sampdoria, even though he played in a different position than I do. Now, as everyone knows, Damiano Tommasi inspires me. It's an honour to be compared to a great player and a great person like him." Of Brighi, Tommasi said, "He's more talented than I am, I just got the chance to play in a great team and win something special. I hope Matteo gets the same chance."

Brighi helped Roma to a strong 2009–10 Serie A season; the team finished second in Serie A, behind treble champions Inter Milan, and also reached the 2010 Coppa Italia final. In September 2010, Brighi signed a new four-year contract with Roma, in which his annual salary was increased to €1.8 million for the 2010–11 Serie A season and to €2.3 million in the next three seasons.

==== Atalanta loan ====
On 31 August 2011, Brighi joined Atalanta on loan. He played 11 league matches in the 2011–12 Serie A season, before he returned to Roma at the end of the season.

=== Torino ===
On 11 August 2012, after a trial period, Brighi moved to Torino on a free loan. On 1 September 2012, he scored his first goal, against Pescara, a match which ended for 3–0. On 13 January 2013, he scored his second goal of the season in the match against Siena (3–2). At the end of the season, Brighi returned to Roma, but on 8 July 2013, he rejoined Torino, this time outright for free.

=== Later career ===
In January 2014, Brighi was transferred to Sassuolo. On 2 February, Brighi made his debut in Sassuolo's starting XI in the club's 2–1 home defeat against Hellas Verona. With seven appearances, he helped the club avoid relegation to Serie B. On 20 July 2015, Brighi returned to Bologna. A year later, he signed for Perugia on a two-year deal. The contract was cancelled in a mutual agreement on 23 January 2018. On 24 January 2018, Brighi signed a contract with Empoli, keeping him at the club until 30 June 2018.

== International career ==
At youth level, Brighi played for the Italy national under-21 football team at the 2002 UEFA European Under-21 Championship, forming the team's midfield alongside Manuele Blasi, Andrea Pirlo, and Marco Marchionni, as they reached the semi-finals. He also won the 2004 UEFA European Under-21 Championship and helped the team qualify to the 2004 Summer Olympics, although he was not included by head coach Claudio Gentile in the squad for the final tournament. In total, he made 35 appearances for the Italy under-21 side, scoring two goals, and also served as the team's captain for a time.

Brighi's senior debut for Italy came at age 21, when he started in a 1–0 friendly defeat against Slovenia on 21 August 2002, in Trieste. After several years without a senior international call-up, he has called up once again by head coach Marcello Lippi for Italy's 2010 FIFA World Cup qualification matches against Montenegro and the Republic of Ireland in March 2009. On 28 March, Brighi was put on as a substitute in the 80th minute of a 2–0 away win against Montenegro, playing for his first time since 2002. Four days later, he was chosen for the starting line-up in Italy's 1–1 draw with the Republic of Ireland.

Brighi was called up again to play in Italy's pre-2009 FIFA Confederations Cup friendly against Northern Ireland in Pisa on 6 June. Brighi came on as a substitute for Gennaro Gattuso at the beginning of the second-half, and provided many spectacular passes, one of which led to a goal, as Italy won the match 3–0. Although Brighi played well, he was not selected in Italy's 23-man roster for the Confederations Cup that summer. In total, he made four appearances for Italy at senior level between 2002 and 2009.

== Style of play ==
Coming up as one of the most promising young players in Italy and Europe in his early career, in 2001 Brighi was named one of the 101 best young players in the world by Don Balón, while in 2002 he was named the Serie A Young Footballer of the Year. He is noted in particular for his stamina, pace, tenacity, and tackling, as well as his willingness to press and chase down opponents in order to win the ball. He has also been praised for his movement off the ball and ability to make attacking runs, which enables him to get into good offensive positions from which he can score goals. His skills and playing style in his youth led him to be compared to Argentine former midfielder Fernando Redondo, as well as Carlo Ancelotti.

== Personal life ==
Brighi is the second of four brothers, who also play football; his younger brother, Marco, is also a professional footballer. Brighi was the highest rated player in the FIFA Football 2003 video game, with a rating of 97 out of 99, which is higher than the likes of Lionel Messi and Cristiano Ronaldo in subsequent FIFA games. This helped him achieve significant notability among fans and gamers.

== Career statistics ==
=== Club ===
As of match played 26 May 2019.

Club performance			League		Cup		Continental		Other		Total	
Season	Club	League	Apps	Goals	Apps	Goals	Apps	Goals	Apps	Goals	Apps	Goals
Italy			League		Coppa Italia		Europe		Coppa Italia Serie C Supercoppa Italiana League playoff		Total	
1998–99 (Note: All of the match report and news article regarding Rimini's performance in 1998–99 Coppa Italia was not documented completely; Brighi had played at least twice in the knockout stage against Ancona; match reports were not available for league playoffs.)	Rimini	Serie C2	10	1	–		–		2+	0	12+	1
1999–2000 (Note: This is according to the match reports of 1999–2000 Coppa Italia Serie C; the match reports against Vis Pesaro and Arezzo were not available, and Brighi played all 3 games in league playoffs.)	Rimini	Serie C2	34	6	–		–		5+	2	39+	8
2000–01	Juventus	Serie A	11	0	1	0	0	0	–		12	0
2001–02	Bologna (loan)	Serie A	32	0	1	0	–		–		33	0
2002–03 (Note: 2002 Supercoppa Italiana for Juventus)	Juventus	Serie A	0	0	0	0	0	0	1	0	1	0
2002–03	Parma	Serie A	22	1	0	0	3	0	–		25	1
2003–04	Brescia (loan)	Serie A	29	1	2	0	–		–		31	1
2004–05	Roma	Serie A	0	0	0	0	–		–		0	0
2004–05	Chievo (loan)	Serie A	35	1	1	0	–		–		36	1
2005–06	Chievo (loan)	Serie A	26	2	0	0	–		–		26	2
2006–07	Chievo (loan)	Serie A	28	6	1	0	3	0	–		31	6
2007–08 (Note: 2007 Supercoppa Italiana)	Roma	Serie A	24	1	5	0	2	0	1	0	32	1
2008–09	Roma	Serie A	35	3	2	0	7	3	–		44	6
2009–10	Roma	Serie A	24	4	2	1	4	0	–		30	5
2010–11	Roma	Serie A	25	1	2	0	3	0	–		30	1
2011–12	Roma	Serie A	0	0	0	0	1	0	–		1	0
2011–12	Atalanta (loan)	Serie A	11	0	0	0	–		–		11	0
2012–13	Torino (loan)	Serie A	23	2	2	0	–		–		25	2
2013–14	Torino	Serie A	16	2	1	0	–		–		17	2
2013–14	Sassuolo	Serie A	8	0	–		–		–		8	0
2014–15	Sassuolo	Serie A	23	0	1	0	–		–		24	0
2015–16	Bologna	Serie A	23	0	1	0	–		–		24	0
2016–17 (Note: 2 appearances in the league promotion playoffs)	Perugia	Serie B	36	2	4	1	–		2	0	42	3
2017–18	Perugia	Serie B	12	0	2	1	–		–		14	1
2017–18	Empoli	Serie B	14	1	–		–		–		14	1
2018–19	Empoli	Serie A	10	1	–		–		–		10	1
Total			511	35	28	3	23	3				

=== International ===
As of 2019.

Italy national team
Year	Apps	Goals
2002	1	0
2003	0	0
2004	0	0
2005	0	0
2006	0	0
2007	0	0
2008	0	0
2009	3	0
Total	4	0

== Honours ==
=== Club ===
Roma

- Coppa Italia (1): 2008
- Supercoppa Italiana (1): 2007

Juventus

- Supercoppa Italiana (1): 2002

=== International ===
Italy

- UEFA European Under-21 Championship (1): 2004

=== Individual ===
- Serie A Young Footballer of the Year (1): 2002
