= Gianluca Curci =

Italian footballer (born 1985)

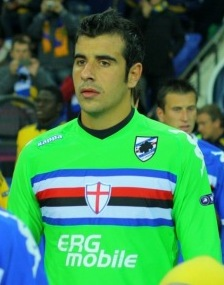

Personal information
- Date of birth: 12 July 1985 (age 41)
- Place of birth: Rome, Italy
- Height: 1.92 m (6 ft 4 in)
- Position: Goalkeeper

Youth career
- 1994–2004: Roma

Senior career*
Years	Team	Apps	(Gls)
2004–2008	Roma	30	(0)
2008–2010	Siena	68	(0)
2010–2011	Sampdoria	35	(0)
2011–2015	Roma	3	(0)
2012–2014	→ Bologna (loan)	51	(0)
2015–2017	Mainz 05	0	(0)
2018	AFC Eskilstuna	27	(0)
2019	Hammarby IF	12	(0)
Total		226	(0)

International career
2003–2004	Italy U19	2	(0)
2004–2005	Italy U20	3	(0)
2005–2007	Italy U21	22	(0)
- * Club domestic league appearances and goals

Gianluca Curci (Italian pronunciation: [dʒanˈluːka ˈkurtʃi]; born 12 July 1985) is an Italian former professional footballer who played as a goalkeeper. A product of the Roma youth system, he made his professional debut for the club in 2004 and went on to play over 200 matches in Serie A for Roma, Siena, Sampdoria and Bologna. Curci also had spells abroad with German side Mainz 05 and in Sweden with AFC Eskilstuna and Hammarby IF.

At international level, Curci represented Italy at various youth tournaments and received a senior call-up for a friendly in 2005.

== Club career ==
=== Roma ===
Born in Rome, Curci is a product of the AS Roma youth academy. At only 19, he became the club's first choice goalkeeper for the second half of the 2004–05 season after injuries to fellow goalkeepers Ivan Pelizzoli and Carlo Zotti. He was replaced in the 2005–06 season by new Brazilian keeper Doni. Curci signed a new four-year contract on 16 July 2007.

=== Siena ===
On 25 June 2008, Siena confirmed they signed Curci in a co-ownership deal from Roma for €1.75 million and signed the remaining 50% rights of Daniele Galloppa for another €1.75M. In exchange, Roma signed keeper Artur for €750,000 and defender Simone Loria for €2.8M.

Curci impressed in all his matches, notably his last two Serie A matches, helping Siena overcome Roma 1–0, and preventing Genoa from scoring more than they did. Curci then impressed in the Tuscan Derby against Fiorentina, performing 3 incredible reaction saves to help Siena win 1–0.

=== Sampdoria ===
On 1 July 2010, Sampdoria bought Siena's half for €2.25 million. Roma retained their half. Curci played for Sampdoria in a match for qualification to the Champions League, against Werder Bremen, but his team lost. Curci was a key player for Sampdoria during the 2010–11 season and he made some crucial saves for the club. He was an ever-present and the club's undisputed first choice goalkeeper.

=== Roma return ===
On 24 June 2011, Roma bought back Curci and Stefano Guberti from Sampdoria for a nominal fee of €1,000 on two-year (Guberti) and three-year deals (Curci) respectively. On 22 April 2012, Curci made a substitute appearance in a Serie A match against Juventus after Roma's starting goalkeeper Maarten Stekelenburg received a red card.

=== Bologna ===
On 16 July 2012, Curci was signed by Bologna in a temporary deal with an option to purchase for €1 million. On 8 July 2013, the loan was extended for another season, with an option to purchase for €1.2 million. Curci also extended his contract with Roma to last until 30 June 2015.

=== Roma return ===
On 2 September 2014, Curci was included in Roma's squad for the 2014–15 UEFA Champions League as one of the four club trained players required under UEFA rules.

=== Mainz 05 ===
On 15 August 2015, Curci was signed by Bundesliga side Mainz on a two-year contract as a free agent. In January 2017, Curci had an unsuccessful trial with Bristol Rovers.

He left the club on 30 January 2017, after failing to make a single league appearance.

=== AFC Eskilstuna ===
On 18 January 2018, Curci signed a two-year deal with Swedish Superettan side AFC Eskilstuna. He kept 18 clean sheets in 27 league appearances, a new club record, as Eskilstuna won a promotion to Allsvenskan through qualifiers.

Curci terminated his contract with AFC by mutual consent on 21 January 2019, with the club citing "personal reasons" for his departure. However, according to Curci himself, he sought to leave Eskilstuna due to differences with the club's management.

=== Hammarby IF ===
On 24 January 2019, Curci signed a six-month contract with fellow Swedish club Hammarby IF, replacing the injured starting goalkeeper Johan Wiland, with an extension option of a further one-and-a-half year. Curci confirmed his departure from the club on 8 July 2019 as his contract had expired.

== International career ==
Curci has represented Italy multiple times at youth level. He received his first call-up to the Azzurri squad for a friendly against Hungary.

== Career statistics ==
Appearances and goals by club, season and competition
Club	Season	League			Cup		Europe		Other		Total	
Club	Season	Division	Apps	Goals	Apps	Goals	Apps	Goals	Apps	Goals	Apps	Goals
Roma	2003–04	Serie A	0	0	0	0	—		—		0	0
Roma	2004–05	Serie A	11	0	6	0	0	0	—		17	0
Roma	2005–06	Serie A	10	0	5	0	8	0	—		23	0
Roma	2006–07	Serie A	7	0	6	0	0	0	—		13	0
Roma	2007–08	Serie A	2	0	5	0	1	0	—		8	0
Roma	Total		30	0	22	0	9	0	—		61	0
Siena	2008–09	Serie A	32	0	1	0	—		—		33	0
Siena	2009–10	Serie A	36	0	1	0	—		—		37	0
Siena	Total		68	0	2	0	—		—		70	0
Sampdoria	2010–11	Serie A	35	0	0	0	6	0	—		41	0
Roma	2011–12	Serie A	3	0	0	0	0	0	—		3	0
Roma	2014–15	Serie A	0	0	0	0	0	0	—		0	0
Roma	Total		3	0	0	0	0	0	—		3	0
Bologna (loan)	2012–13	Serie A	14	0	0	0	—		—		14	0
Bologna (loan)	2013–14	Serie A	37	0	1	0	—		—		38	0
Bologna (loan)	Total		51	0	1	0	—		—		52	0
Mainz 05	2015–16	Bundesliga	0	0	0	0	—		—		0	0
Mainz 05	2016–17	Bundesliga	0	0	0	0	0	0	—		0	0
Mainz 05	Total		0	0	0	0	0	0	—		0	0
AFC Eskilstuna	2018	Superettan	27	0	0	0	—		2	0	29	0
Hammarby IF	2019	Allsvenskan	12	0	2	0	—		—		14	0
Career total			226	0	27	0	15	0	2	0	270	0

== Honours ==
=== Club ===
Roma

- Coppa Italia: 2006–07, 2007–08
- Supercoppa Italiana: 2007
