= Alessandro Tulli =

Italian footballer (born 1982)

Personal information
- Date of birth: 8 April 1982 (age 44)
- Place of birth: Rome, Italy
- Height: 1.85 m (6 ft 1 in)
- Position: Striker

Senior career*
Years	Team	Apps	(Gls)
2000–2006	Roma	0	(0)
2001–2002	→ Vicenza (loan)	8	(0)
2002–2003	→ Livorno (loan)	4	(1)
2003–2004	→ Salernitana (loan)	29	(6)
2004–2006	→ Triestina (loan)	45	(10)
2006–2008	Lecce	33	(6)
2008–2010	Piacenza	29	(3)
2012–2013	Latina	12	(1)

International career^{‡}
1999	Italy U-17	1	(0)
2001	Italy U-18	1	(0)
- * Club domestic league appearances and goals ‡ National team caps and goals as of 7 March 2001

Alessandro Tulli (born 8 April 1982) is an Italian footballer.

Tulli began his career in the youth system of A.S. Roma. He was loaned to several Serie B clubs before U.S. Lecce acquired him in a join-ownership bid on 31 August 2006, for €250,000.

On 31 January 2008, Piacenza bought the remaining half of his rights from A.S. Roma for a reported €650,000 (via Lecce, which Lecce paid €350,000 to Roma), and Tulli joined Piacenza alongside Zlatko Dedič and Matteo Serafini as a replacement for Daniele Cacia. However, he lost his starting place during the 2008–09 Serie B season, and he also suffered an injury in the summer of 2008.

In June 2010, Lecce relinquished the remaining 50% registration rights for free. In January 2011, Piacenza released Tulli. After a year without a club, Tulli signed with Latina.

Tulli became a free agent again in the summer of 2013.
