= Alessandro Simonetta =

Italian footballer (born 1986)

Personal information
- Date of birth: 17 March 1986 (age 39)
- Place of birth: Latina, Italy
- Position: Forward

Senior career*
Years	Team	Apps	(Gls)
2004–2005	Roma	0	(0)
2005–2007	Arezzo	16	(0)
2007	→ Sambenedettese (loan)	4	(1)
2008–2009	Südtirol	26	(2)
2009-2010	Isola Liri	24	(3)
2010–2016	Astrea	110	(28)
- * Club domestic league appearances and goals

Alessandro Simonetta (born 17 March 1986) is an Italian retired footballer who played as a forward.

== Career ==
While still in school, Simonetta was called up to the AS Roma squad for a Champions League match against Real Madrid CF. Despite having made the bench, he did not play. After playing in the Italian second and third divisions, Simonetta joined the police at the age of 24, playing for ASD Astrea, the fourth division police team and becoming one of the most wanted players at an amateur level.

== Trivia ==
Simonetta was well known in the Championship Manager/Football Manager video game community for his playing potential.
