= 2007–08 Coppa Italia =

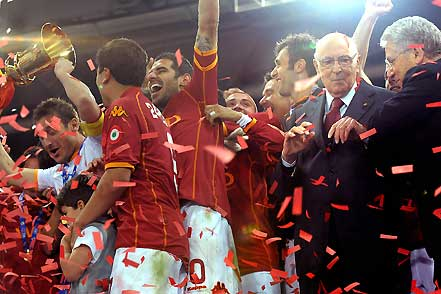
- Roma players are given the trophy by Italian president Giorgio Napolitano after the final

Tournament details
- Country: Italy
- Dates: 14 Aug 2007 – 24 May 2008
- Teams: 42

Final positions
- Champions: Roma (9th title)
- Runners-up: Internazionale

Tournament statistics
- Matches played: 55
- Goals scored: 160 (2.91 per match)
- Top goal scorer(s): Mario Balotelli; Julio Cruz; Vincenzo Iaquinta; Giampaolo Pazzini (4 goals each)

The 2007–08 Coppa Italia, also known as TIM Cup for sponsorship reasons, was the 61st edition of the national domestic tournament. Fixtures were announced at 16:00 CET, July 25, 2007. The tournament began on August 14, 2007, and ended on May 24, 2008, with a single-match final played at the Stadio Olimpico in Rome. For the fourth consecutive tournament, Roma and Internazionale were the finalists. Roma won the tournament 2–1 in the final.

The format of the 2007–08 Coppa, which was announced on June 28, 2007, was a major departure from the format used in previous cup tournaments. The new format reduced the number of competitors to the 42 teams that would play in Serie A and Serie B for the 2007–08 season; no Serie C teams participated in the tournament. Also, the rather unusual two-leg final was eliminated.

== Seedings and format ==
The format for pairings were as follows:

- First phase: one-leg fixtures
  - First round: The bottom 24 seeds (19–42) were paired
  - Second round: The 12 first round winners were paired
- Second phase: one-leg fixtures
  - 6 first phase winners and seeds 9–18 were paired
- Third phase: two-leg fixtures
  - Round of 16: 8 second phase winners were inserted into a bracket with seeds 1–8
  - Quarterfinals and Semifinals: Two-leg fixtures with pairings based upon bracket
- Final: one-leg fixture at a neutral venue

Seeds in the tournament were allocated as follows:

Seed	Club	Allocation	Phase of Entry
1	Roma	Defending Champion	Third Phase
2	Internazionale	Participants in Champions League, UEFA Cup, and Intertoto Cup	Third Phase
3	Lazio	Participants in Champions League, UEFA Cup, and Intertoto Cup	Third Phase
4	Milan	Participants in Champions League, UEFA Cup, and Intertoto Cup	Third Phase
5	Palermo	Participants in Champions League, UEFA Cup, and Intertoto Cup	Third Phase
6	Fiorentina	Participants in Champions League, UEFA Cup, and Intertoto Cup	Third Phase
7	Empoli	Participants in Champions League, UEFA Cup, and Intertoto Cup	Third Phase
8	Sampdoria	Participants in Champions League, UEFA Cup, and Intertoto Cup	Third Phase
9	Atalanta	Remaining Serie A teams to 17th place	Second Phase
10	Udinese	Remaining Serie A teams to 17th place	Second Phase
11	Livorno	Remaining Serie A teams to 17th place	Second Phase
12	Parma	Remaining Serie A teams to 17th place	Second Phase
13	Catania	Remaining Serie A teams to 17th place	Second Phase
14	Reggina	Remaining Serie A teams to 17th place	Second Phase
15	Siena	Remaining Serie A teams to 17th place	Second Phase
16	Cagliari	Remaining Serie A teams to 17th place	Second Phase
17	Torino	Remaining Serie A teams to 17th place	Second Phase
18	Juventus	Serie B teams promoted to Serie A this season	Second Phase
19	Napoli	Serie B teams promoted to Serie A this season	First Phase
20	Genoa	Serie B teams promoted to Serie A this season	First Phase
21	Chievo	Serie A teams demoted to Serie B this season	First Phase
22	Ascoli	Serie A teams demoted to Serie B this season	First Phase
23	Messina	Serie A teams demoted to Serie B this season	First Phase
24	Piacenza	Remaining Serie B teams to 17th place	First Phase
25	Rimini	Remaining Serie B teams to 17th place	First Phase
26	Brescia	Remaining Serie B teams to 17th place	First Phase
27	Bologna	Remaining Serie B teams to 17th place	First Phase
28	Mantova	Remaining Serie B teams to 17th place	First Phase
29	Lecce	Remaining Serie B teams to 17th place	First Phase
30	AlbinoLeffe	Remaining Serie B teams to 17th place	First Phase
31	Vicenza	Remaining Serie B teams to 17th place	First Phase
32	Treviso	Remaining Serie B teams to 17th place	First Phase
33	Bari	Remaining Serie B teams to 17th place	First Phase
34	Frosinone	Remaining Serie B teams to 17th place	First Phase
35	Modena	Remaining Serie B teams to 17th place	First Phase
36	Cesena	Remaining Serie B teams to 17th place	First Phase
37	Triestina	Remaining Serie B teams to 17th place	First Phase
38	Spezia	Winner of Serie B Play-out	First Phase
39	Ravenna	4 teams promoted from Serie C1	First Phase
40	Grosseto	4 teams promoted from Serie C1	First Phase
41	Avellino	4 teams promoted from Serie C1	First Phase
42	Pisa	4 teams promoted from Serie C1	First Phase

== Fixtures ==
=== Opening rounds ===
* indicates home team in each leg

==== Top left bracket ====
First elim. round August 14 and 15, 2007
Rimini(2)	6*
Frosinone(2)	0
Lecce(2)	2(3)
Treviso(2)	2(4)*

Second elim. round August 18, 2007
Rimini	3*
Treviso	1

Third elim. round August 29, 2007
Rimini	2*
Torino (aet)	3
Cagliari	2
Siena	1*

Round of 16; December 6, 11, 12, 19 and 20, 2007; January 15, 16, and 17, 2008
Roma	1	4*	5
Torino	3*	0	3
Sampdoria	0	4*	4
Cagliari	1*	0	1

Quarterfinals; January 23 and 24, 2008; January 29 and 30, 2008
Roma	1	1*	2
Sampdoria	1*	0	1

==== Bottom left bracket ====
Round 1
Messina (2)	2(3)*
Vicenza(2)	2(4)
Albinoleffe(2)	0
Bari(2)	1*
Bologna(2)	2*
Modena(2)	1
Mantova(2)	0
Triestina(2)	1*

Round 2
Vicenza	0
Bari	2*
Bologna	1(3)*
Triestina	1(4)

Quarterfinals
Bari	0*
Udinese	3
Triestina	0(2)
Catania	0(4)*

Semifinals
Palermo	0*	0	0
Udinese	0	1*	1
Milan	1*	1	2
Catania	2	1*	3

Final
Udinese	3*	1	4
Catania (a)	2	2*	4

==== Top right bracket ====
Round 1
Brescia	1
Pisa^{1}	2*
Napoli	4*
Cesena	0
Ascoli	2
Avellino^{2}	0*
Genoa	2*
Grosseto	1

Round 2
Pisa	1
Napoli (aet)	3*
Ascoli (aet)	3*
Genoa	2

Quarterfinals
Napoli	1(4)*
Livorno	1(3)
Ascoli (aet)	2*
Atalanta	1

Semifinals
Lazio	2*	1	3
Napoli	1	1*	2
Fiorentina	1	2*	3
Ascoli	1*	0	1

Final
Lazio	2*	2	4
Fiorentina	1	1*	2

==== Bottom Right Bracket ====
Round 1
Chievo	0
Ravenna	1*
Piacenza^{3}	2*
Spezia	0

Round 2
Ravenna	1*
Piacenza^{4}	2

Quarterfinals
Piacenza	2
Reggina	3*
Juventus	3
Parma	1*

Semifinals
Internazionale	4	3*	7
Reggina	1*	0	1
Empoli	2*	3	5
Juventus	1	5*	6

Final
Internazionale	2*	3	5
Juventus	2	2*	4

^{1} The match was played in Pistoia, approximately 67 km from Pisa. Pisa was originally designated as the home team.

^{2} The match was played behind closed doors in Avellino.

^{3} The match was played in Fiorenzuola, approximately 23 km from Piacenza. Piacenza was originally designated as the home team.

^{4} The match was played at Ravenna, even though according to the original bracket Piacenza was designated as the home team.

=== Semi-finals and final ===
Semi-finals; April 16, 2008; May 7 and May 8, 2008
Roma	1	1	2
Catania	0	1	1
Lazio	0	0	0
Internazionale	0	2	2

Final; Stadio Olimpico, Rome; May 24, 2008
Roma	2
Internazionale	1

== Final ==
24 May 2008
20:45 CEST

Roma	2–1	Internazionale
Mexès 36'; Perrotta 54'	Report	Pelé 60'

Stadio Olimpico, Rome
Attendance: 60,000
Referee: Emidio Morganti

== Top goalscorers ==
Rank	Player	Club	Goals
1	(Italy) Mario Balotelli	Internazionale	4
1	(Argentina) Julio Cruz	Internazionale	4
1	(Italy) Vincenzo Iaquinta	Juventus	4
1	(Italy) Giampaolo Pazzini	Fiorentina	4
5	(Italy) Alessandro Del Piero	Juventus	3
5	(Italy) Francesco Totti	Roma	3
5	(Brazil) Mancini	Roma	3
5	(Argentina) Ezequiel Lavezzi	Napoli	3
5	(Italy) Maurizio Domizzi	Napoli	3
5	(Brazil) Jeda	Rimini	3
5	(Italy) Francesco Valiani	Rimini	3
5	(Italy) Nicola Pozzi	Empoli	3
5	(Italy) Stefano Guberti	Ascoli	3
