= 2005 Coppa Italia final =

57th Coppa Italia final
- Event: 2004–05 Coppa Italia
Roma	Internazionale
0	3

First leg
Roma	Internazionale
0	2
- Date: 12 June 2005
- Venue: Stadio Olimpico, Rome
- Referee: Pierluigi Collina
- Attendance: 73,437
- Weather: Clear; 20 °C (68 °F)

Second leg
Internazionale	Roma
1	0
- Date: 15 June 2005
- Venue: San Siro, Milan
- Referee: Matteo Trefoloni
- Attendance: 72,034
- Weather: Clear; 21 °C (70 °F)

The 2005 Coppa Italia final was the final of the 2004–05 Coppa Italia, the top cup competition in Italian football. The match was played over two legs between Roma and Internazionale. This was the 12th Coppa Italia final played by Roma and the 8th by Inter. It was the first meeting of these two clubs in the finals. The first leg was played in Rome on 12 June 2005, in which Inter won 2–0. The second leg was played on 15 June 2005 in Milan and Inter won 1–0 to seal the trophy on an aggregate result of 3–0.

== First leg ==
12 June 2005
21:30

Roma	0–2	Internazionale
		Adriano 30', 36'

Stadio Olimpico, Rome
Attendance: 73,437
Referee: Pierluigi Collina

Roma	Internazionale

GK	1	(Italy) Gianluca Curci
RB	2	(Italy) Christian Panucci
CB	8	(Italy) Matteo Ferrari	(yellow card) 29'
CB	13	(Romania) Cristian Chivu	Booked
LB	25	(Argentina) Leandro Cufré		(substituted off) 82'
CM	28	(Italy) Valerio Virga		(substituted off) 58'
CM	15	(France) Olivier Dacourt
RW	20	(Italy) Simone Perrotta	(yellow card) 73'
AM	10	(Italy) Francesco Totti (c)
LW	30	(Brazil) Mancini		(substituted off) 72'
FW	18	(Italy) Antonio Cassano
Substitutes:
FW	9	(Italy) Vincenzo Montella		(substituted on) 58'
CM		(Italy) Leandro Greco		(substituted on) 72'
CB	19	(Italy) Giuseppe Scurto		(substituted on) 82'
Manager:
(Italy) Bruno Conti

GK	1	(Italy) Francesco Toldo
RB	4	(Argentina) Javier Zanetti (c)
CB	23	(Italy) Marco Materazzi
CB	11	(Serbia and Montenegro) Siniša Mihajlović
LB	16	(Italy) Giuseppe Favalli
CM	25	(Serbia and Montenegro) Dejan Stanković
CM	19	(Argentina) Esteban Cambiasso
RW	13	(Brazil) Zé Maria
LW	18	(Argentina) Kily González		(substituted off) 86'
FW	10	(Brazil) Adriano
FW	30	(Nigeria) Obafemi Martins	(substituted off) 76'
Substitutes:
FW	9	(Argentina) Julio Cruz		(substituted on) 76'
RW	7	(Netherlands) Andy van der Meyde		(substituted on) 86'
Manager:
(Italy) Roberto Mancini

== Second leg ==
15 June 2005
20:45

Internazionale	1–0	Roma
Mihajlović 52'

San Siro, Milan
Attendance: 72,034
Referee: Matteo Trefoloni

Internazionale	Roma

GK	1	(Italy) Francesco Toldo
RB	2	(Colombia) Iván Córdoba (c)	(yellow card) 84'
CB	23	(Italy) Marco Materazzi
CB	11	(Serbia and Montenegro) Siniša Mihajlović	(yellow card) 18'
LB	16	(Italy) Giuseppe Favalli		(substituted off) 87'
CM	25	(Serbia and Montenegro) Dejan Stanković	(yellow card) 28'	(substituted off) 90'
CM	6	(Italy) Cristiano Zanetti
RW	13	(Brazil) Zé Maria		(substituted off) 85'
LW	18	(Argentina) Kily González
FW	9	(Argentina) Julio Cruz
FW	30	(Nigeria) Obafemi Martins
Substitutes:
MF	14	(Argentina) Juan Sebastián Verón		(substituted on) 85'
CB	24	(Paraguay) Carlos Gamarra		(substituted on) 87'
MF	51	(Italy) Fabrizio Biava		(substituted on) 90'
Manager:
(Italy) Roberto Mancini

GK	1	(Italy) Gianluca Curci
RB	2	(Italy) Christian Panucci	(yellow card) 16'
CB	13	(Romania) Cristian Chivu		(substituted off) 79'
CB	5	(France) Philippe Mexès
LB	25	(Argentina) Leandro Cufré	(yellow card) 47' (yellow-red card) 65'
CM	4	(Italy) Daniele De Rossi
CM	15	(France) Olivier Dacourt	(substituted off) 46'
RW	20	(Italy) Simone Perrotta	(yellow card) 61'
LW	30	(Brazil) Mancini
FW	10	(Italy) Francesco Totti (c)
FW	18	(Italy) Antonio Cassano	(yellow card) 31'
Substitutes:
FW	9	(Italy) Vincenzo Montella		(substituted on) 46' (substituted off) 73'
FW	11	(Italy) Daniele Corvia		(substituted on) 73'
CB	8	(Italy) Matteo Ferrari		(substituted on) 79'
Manager:
(Italy) Bruno Conti

== See also ==
- 2004–05 Inter Milan season
- 2004–05 AS Roma season

Played between same clubs:

- 2006 Coppa Italia final
- 2007 Coppa Italia final
- 2008 Coppa Italia final
- 2010 Coppa Italia final
