= 2006 Coppa Italia final =

58th Coppa Italia final
- Event: 2005–06 Coppa Italia
| Roma | Internazionale |
| 2 | 4 |

First leg
| Roma | Internazionale |
| 1 | 1 |
- Date: 3 May 2006
- Venue: Stadio Olimpico, Rome
- Referee: Matteo Trefoloni
- Attendance: 64,000
- Weather: Scattered clouds 16 °C (61 °F)

Second leg
| Internazionale | Roma |
| 3 | 1 |
- Date: 11 May 2006
- Venue: San Siro, Milan
- Referee: Domenico Messina
- Attendance: 59,000
- Weather: Clear; 19 °C (66 °F)

The 2006 Coppa Italia final was the final of the 2005–06 Coppa Italia, the top cup competition in Italian football. The match was played over two legs between Roma and Internazionale. This was the second final between these two clubs, the match being the replay of previous season's final. The first leg was played in Rome on 3 May 2006, while the second leg on 11 May 2006. Inter won the trophy with an aggregate result of 4–2. With this victory, Internazionale manager Roberto Mancini won the Coppa Italia for the tenth time, six as a player, four as a coach.

== First leg ==
3 May 2006
20:45

| Roma | 1–1 | Internazionale |
|---|---|---|
| Mancini 55' | | Cruz 8' |

Stadio Olimpico, Rome
Attendance: 64,000
Referee: Matteo Trefoloni

| Roma | Internazionale |

| GK | 32 | (Brazil) Doni |
| RB | 2 | (Italy) Christian Panucci |
| CB | 5 | (France) Philippe Mexès | (yellow card) 71' |
| CB | 13 | (Romania) Cristian Chivu | | (substituted off) 46' |
| LB | 25 | (Argentina) Leandro Cufrè |
| CM | 17 | (Italy) Damiano Tommasi (c) | | (substituted off) 80' |
| CM | 16 | (Italy) Daniele De Rossi |
| RW | 20 | (Italy) Simone Perrotta |
| AM | 14 | (France) Houssine Kharja |
| LW | 30 | (Brazil) Mancini | | (substituted off) 85' |
| FW | 11 | (Brazil) Rodrigo Taddei | (yellow card) 43' |
Substitutes:
| CB | 3 | (Italy) Cesare Bovo | | (substituted in) 46' |
| FW | 35 | (Italy) Stefano Okaka | | (substituted in) 80' |
| RW | 7 | (Honduras) Edgar Álvarez | | (substituted in) 85' |
Manager:
(Italy) Luciano Spalletti

| GK | 12 | (Brazil) Júlio César |
| RB | 4 | (Argentina) Javier Zanetti (c) |
| CB | 2 | (Colombia) Iván Córdoba |
| CB | 25 | (Argentina) Walter Samuel | (yellow card) 66' | (substituted off) 70' |
| LB | 16 | (Italy) Giuseppe Favalli |
| CM | 7 | (Portugal) Luís Figo |
| CM | 8 | (Chile) David Pizarro | (yellow card) 90+' |
| CM | 19 | (Argentina) Esteban Cambiasso |
| AM | 5 | (Serbia and Montenegro) Dejan Stanković | | (substituted off) 73' |
| FW | 10 | (Brazil) Adriano | | (substituted off) 80' |
| FW | 9 | (Argentina) Julio Cruz | (yellow card) 12' |
Substitutes:
| CB | 3 | (Argentina) Nicolás Burdisso | | (substituted in) 70' |
| LW | 31 | (Brazil) César | | (substituted in) 73' |
| FW | 30 | (Nigeria) Obafemi Martins | (yellow card) 90+' | (substituted in) 80' |
Manager:
(Italy) Roberto Mancini

== Second leg ==
11 May 2006
20:45

| Internazionale | 3–1 | Roma |
|---|---|---|
| Cambiasso 6'; Cruz 46'; Martins 76' | | Nonda 80' |

San Siro, Milan
Attendance: 59,000
Referee: Domenico Messina

| Internazionale | Roma |

| GK | 12 | (Brazil) Júlio César |
| RB | 4 | (Argentina) Javier Zanetti (c) |
| CB | 23 | (Italy) Marco Materazzi | (yellow card) 80' |
| CB | 25 | (Argentina) Walter Samuel |
| LB | 16 | (Italy) Giuseppe Favalli |
| CM | 7 | (Portugal) Luís Figo | | (substituted off) 81' |
| CM | 8 | (Chile) David Pizarro | (yellow card) 43' |
| CM | 19 | (Argentina) Esteban Cambiasso |
| CM | 5 | (Serbia and Montenegro) Dejan Stanković | | (substituted off) 58' |
| FW | 10 | (Brazil) Adriano | | (substituted off) 67' |
| FW | 9 | (Argentina) Julio Cruz |
Substitutes:
| M | 21 | (Argentina) Santiago Solari | | (substituted in) 58' |
| FW | 30 | (Nigeria) Obafemi Martins | | (substituted in) 67' |
| LW | 18 | (Argentina) Kily González | | (substituted in) 81' |
Manager:
(Italy) Roberto Mancini

| GK | 32 | (Brazil) Doni |
| RB | 2 | (Italy) Christian Panucci |
| CB | 13 | (Romania) Cristian Chivu | | (substituted off) 13' |
| CB | 3 | (Italy) Cesare Bovo | (yellow card) 84' |
| LB | 25 | (Argentina) Leandro Cufré |
| CM | 14 | (France) Houssine Kharja | (yellow card) 36' | (substituted off) 76' |
| CM | 15 | (France) Olivier Dacourt |
| RW | 28 | (Italy) Aleandro Rosi | (yellow card) 83' |
| AM | 17 | (Italy) Damiano Tommasi (c) |
| LW | 30 | (Brazil) Mancini |
| FW | 35 | (Italy) Stefano Okaka Chuka | | (substituted off) 54' |
Substitutes:
| CB | 4 | (Ghana) Samuel Kuffour | | (substituted in) 13' |
| FW | 10 | (Italy) Francesco Totti | | (substituted in) 54' |
| FW | 40 | (Democratic Republic of the Congo) Shabani Nonda | | (substituted in) 76' |
Manager:
(Italy) Luciano Spalletti

== See also ==
- 2005–06 Inter Milan season
- 2005–06 AS Roma season

Played between same clubs:

- 2005 Coppa Italia final
- 2007 Coppa Italia final
- 2008 Coppa Italia final
- 2010 Coppa Italia final
