= 2010 Coppa Italia final =

62nd Coppa Italia final
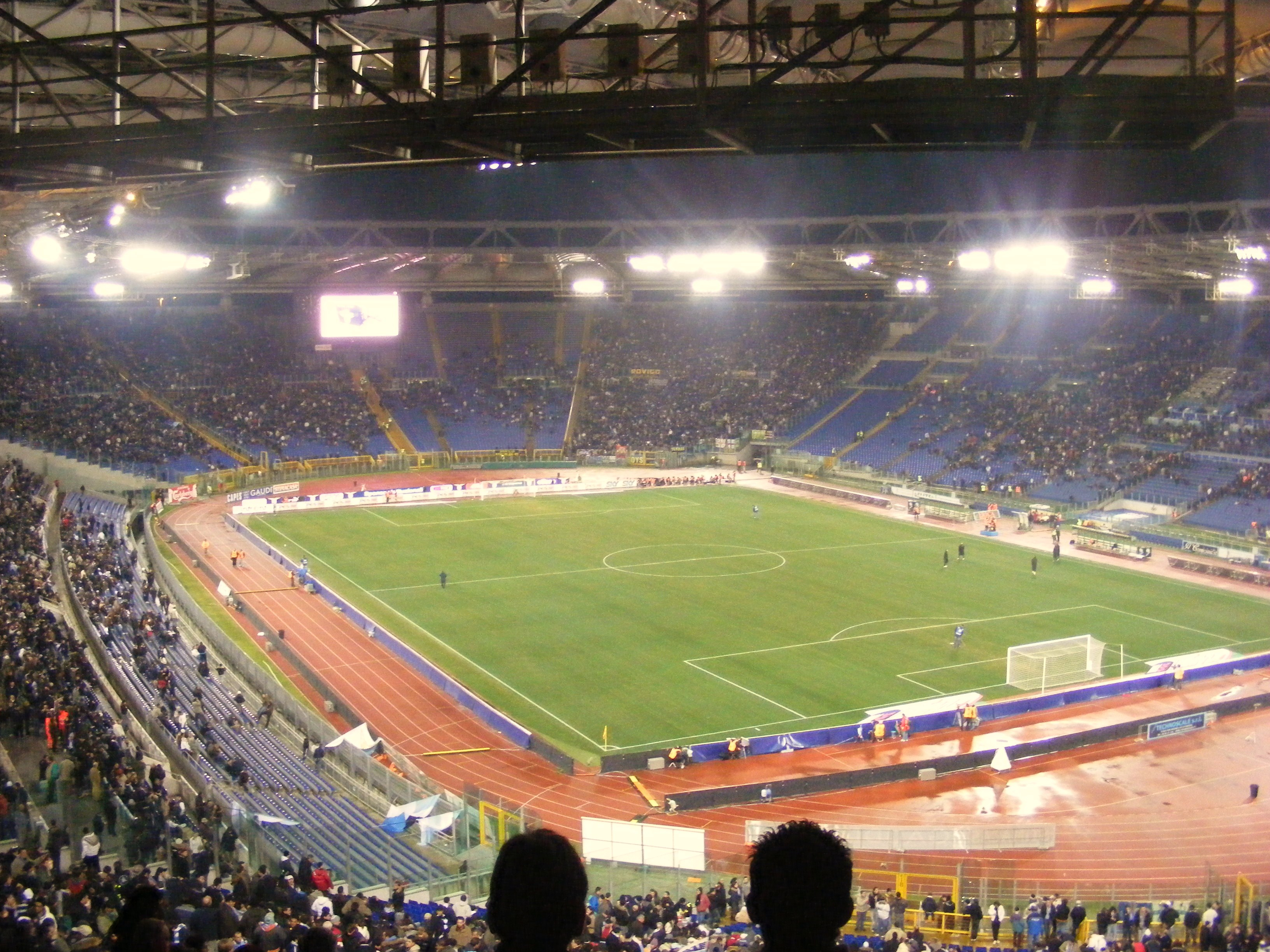
- Event: 2009–10 Coppa Italia
Internazionale	Roma
1	0
- Date: 5 May 2010
- Venue: Stadio Olimpico, Rome
- Referee: Nicola Rizzoli
- Attendance: 55,000
- Weather: Partly cloudy 16 °C (61 °F)

The 2010 Coppa Italia final was the final match of the 2009–10 Coppa Italia, the top cup competition in Italian football. The match was played at the Stadio Olimpico in Rome on 5 May 2010 between Internazionale and Roma and was a repeat of the 2008 Coppa Italia Final. The match was won by Internazionale, who claimed their sixth Coppa Italia title with a lone Diego Milito goal giving them a 1–0 win. It was the first time Inter won the trophy since the abolition of the two-legged final.

== Previous finals ==
This is the fifth final between these two clubs, the four previous matches dating back to the last five years and being consecutive between 2005–2008. This incredible list of repeated finals is increasing disputes around the actual competition formula, which gives an excessive advantage to the clubs participating in the European cups, who enter the cup in the round of 16 and play single matches at home.

== Road to the final ==
Internazionale		Round	Roma
Opponent	Result	2009–10 Coppa Italia	Opponent	Result
Livorno	1–0	Round of 16	Triestina	3–1
Juventus	2–1	Quarter-finals	Catania	1–0
Fiorentina	1–0 (H); 1–0 (A) (2–0 agg.)	Semi-finals	Udinese	2–0 (H); 0–1 (A) (2–1 agg.)

== Match ==
=== Details ===
5 May 2010
20:45

Internazionale	1–0	Roma
Milito 39'	Report

Stadio Olimpico, Rome
Attendance: 55,000
Referee: Nicola Rizzoli

Internazionale	Roma

GK	12	(Brazil) Júlio César
RB	13	(Brazil) Maicon
CB	2	(Colombia) Iván Córdoba	(substituted off) 39'
CB	23	(Italy) Marco Materazzi	(yellow card) 35'
LB	26	(Romania) Cristian Chivu	(yellow card) 45'
CM	4	(Argentina) Javier Zanetti (c)
CM	19	(Argentina) Esteban Cambiasso
CM	8	(Brazil) Thiago Motta
AM	10	(Netherlands) Wesley Sneijder	(substituted off) 5'
CF	9	(Cameroon) Samuel Eto'o
CF	22	(Argentina) Diego Milito
Substitutes:
GK	1	(Italy) Francesco Toldo
CB	25	(Argentina) Walter Samuel	(substituted on) 39'	(yellow card) 53'
DM	17	(Kenya) McDonald Mariga
CM	5	(Serbia) Dejan Stanković
CM	11	(Ghana) Sulley Muntari	(substituted on) 90'
FW	27	(North Macedonia) Goran Pandev
FW	45	(Italy) Mario Balotelli	(substituted on) 5'	(substituted off) 90'	(yellow card) 88'
Manager:
(Portugal) José Mourinho

GK	27	(Brazil) Júlio Sérgio
RB	29	(Argentina) Nicolás Burdisso	(substituted off) 46'	(yellow card) 14'
CB	4	(Brazil) Juan
CB	5	(France) Philippe Mexès		(yellow card) 44'
LB	17	(Norway) John Arne Riise
RM	11	(Brazil) Rodrigo Taddei
CM	20	(Italy) Simone Perrotta	(yellow card) 37'
CM	7	(Chile) David Pizarro	(substituted off) 46'
LM	16	(Italy) Daniele De Rossi (c)
CF	9	(Montenegro) Mirko Vučinić
CF	30	(Italy) Luca Toni	(substituted off) 63'
Substitutes:
GK	1	(Romania) Bogdan Lobonț
RB	13	(Italy) Marco Motta	(substituted on) 46'
LB	22	(Italy) Max Tonetto
MF	33	(Italy) Matteo Brighi
AM	19	(Brazil) Júlio Baptista
FW	10	(Italy) Francesco Totti	(substituted on) 46'	(yellow card) 63' (red card) 87'
FW	94	(France) Jérémy Ménez	(substituted on) 63'
Manager:
(Italy) Claudio Ranieri

== See also ==
- 2009–10 Inter Milan season
- 2009–10 AS Roma season

Played between same clubs:

- 2005 Coppa Italia final
- 2006 Coppa Italia final
- 2007 Coppa Italia final
- 2008 Coppa Italia final
