= Matteo Ferrari =

Italian footballer (born 1979)

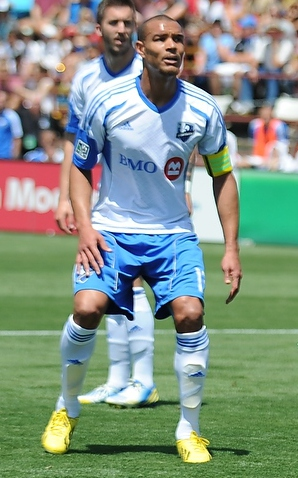
- Ferrari with the Montreal Impact in 2013

Personal information
- Full name: Matteo Ferrari
- Date of birth: 5 December 1979 (age 46)
- Place of birth: Aflou, Algeria
- Height: 1.88 m (6 ft 2 in)
- Position: Centre-back

Youth career
- 1995–1996: SPAL
- 1996–1997: Internazionale

Senior career*
Years	Team	Apps	(Gls)
1997–1998	Genoa	3	(0)
1998–1999	Lecce	13	(0)
1999–2001	Internazionale	19	(0)
1999–2000	→ Bari (loan)	26	(0)
2001–2004	Parma	81	(3)
2004–2008	Roma	78	(2)
2005–2006	→ Everton (loan)	8	(0)
2008–2009	Genoa	33	(0)
2009–2011	Beşiktaş	46	(0)
2012–2014	Montreal Impact	81	(1)
Total		388	(6)

International career
1999–2002	Italy U21	28	(1)
2004	Italy Olympic (O.P.)	6	(0)
2002–2004	Italy	11	(0)
Medal record
Olympic Games
Representing Italy
Men's Football
Bronze medal – third place	2004 Athens	Team competition
- * Club domestic league appearances and goals

Matteo Ferrari Cavaliere OMRI (Italian pronunciation: [matˈtɛːo ferˈraːri]; born 5 December 1979) is an Italian former footballer who played as a defender He played top-flight football for several Italian clubs in Serie A, Everton of the Premier League, and for the Montreal Impact in Major League Soccer. He was usually deployed as a centre-back, although he was capable of playing anywhere along the back-line.

Ferrari played for Italy at the Summer Olympics in 2000 and 2004, winning Bronze at the latter edition of the tournament. He also made 11 full international appearances for his country between 2002 and 2004, featuring in the Italian squad that took part at Euro 2004.

== Early life and family ==
Matteo Ferrari is the Algeria-born son of an Italian petroleum engineer and a mother originally from Guinea. His father worked in various countries throughout Africa because of his vocation. His father died in 1993 when Matteo was 14.

He grew up in Ferrara and has a brother who was a football player. Ferrari and Venezuelan model Aída Yéspica re-united in December 2009. They have a son named Aron, born in 2008.

== Club career ==
=== Early career ===
Ferrari started his career at SPAL in 1995, and he can play as a left-back or centre-back. It has all the rigmarole of youth teams, from young students: the coach of the time, Luigi Pasetti, employed him as a central striker, and the player scored 37 goals in the league before switching back to defence. Internazionale brought him to their youth system, later farming him to Genoa CFC (in co-ownership), Lecce (in co-ownership) and AS Bari (loan).

He made his Serie A debut on 29 August 1999, when Bari lost 1-0 to Fiorentina 1–0, where Ferrari played the full match.

He went back to Inter in summer 2000, making 27 appearances in all competition, but failed to stay, this time sold to Parma in co-ownership deal, for 9 billion lire (€4,648,112). That season Parma also signed Sébastien Frey from Internazionale for 40 billion lire (€20,658,275; cash plus Sérgio Conceição) and sold Gianluigi Buffon and Lilian Thuram to Juventus.

=== Parma ===
A permanent transfer was made because of his good performance in May 2002, for €5.7 million. That season, Inter also sent Adriano and Vratislav Greško to Parma (in co-ownership deal for €8.8 million and definite deal for €16 million), and signed Fabio Cannavaro (undisclosed) and Matías Almeyda (for €16 million) from the Emilia side. In three seasons as a starter for Parma, Ferrari appeared in 81 league matches and scored three goals. At Parma, Ferrari led his team win their first National convenor.

=== Roma ===
On 31 July 2004, he joined Roma for €7.25 million fee. He also signed a contract worth €2.965 million annually in gross. (Part of the fee paid via Damiano Ferronetti going in the opposite direction and the loan of Cesare Bovo on the same day), as a replacement of Walter Samuel who went to Real Madrid. He failed to give the performances he had delivered in Parma in his first season with the capital club.

Ferrari came back to Roma at the beginning of the season 2006–07 as Roma finished 2nd in the previous season and qualified for 2006–07 UEFA Champions League group stage (benefited due to the scandal) and was first choice central-back partnered with Philippe Mexès, while Cristian Chivu as leftback or centre-back and Christian Panucci as the primary right-back, with Marco Cassetti as replacement. Roma also sent experienced Samuel Kuffour out on loan and sold Leandro Cufré. Ferrari played 27 time in Serie A, 24 of them were starters, helping Roma to achieve second place in Serie A and winning the Coppa Italia. His erratic performance and poor security that has given in defence earned him the nickname Svirgolone as he could not show the same brilliant game during his time at Parma.

=== Everton (loan) ===
Despite facing a transfer ban blocking Roma from signing players, on 24 August 2005, the Giallorossi loaned him to UEFA Champions League competitor Everton for €200,000, with an option to purchase for €5.5 million.

It took a few games for him to get accustomed to the Premiership, but Ferrari showed plenty of quality when he finally got going for Everton. Unfortunately, that was brought to an end in the 1–0 win over Arsenal, when he sustained nerve damage to his hamstring, which kept him out of action. He returned to the Everton side for the FA Cup 4th round replay defeat against Chelsea. In April 2006, Everton manager David Moyes was talking about the summer transfer campaign on evertonfc.com and said that based on player performance, he had already decided which players he wanted to keep.

"Players are always playing for their future in some way, but we know exactly what they can do and I don't think what happens in the last month of the season will make a big difference to what I have decided."

–David Moyes

In May 2006, Moyes told evertonfc.com, the official site of Everton, that Ferrari's loan would not be extended.

=== Genoa ===
As his contract with Roma expired at the end of the 2007–08 Serie A season. Eventually, Ferrari decided to sign with Genoa for the 2008–09 Serie A season on a free transfer. Following his move to Genoa, Ferrari made his debut in the opening game of the season on 31 August 2008 in a 1–0 loss against Catania. During his time at Genoa, Ferrari had disciplinary issues with six yellow cards and two red cards. Ferrari received a red card in a 1–1 draw against Catania (the club he played against on his debut in a Genoa shirt) on 25 January 2009 after a second bookable offence. He received a one-match ban and made his return against Palermo in a 1–0 win on 1 February 2009. Ferrari received another after another second bookable offence in a 3–1 win over Sampdoria on 3 May 2009. He also received a one-match ban and made his return against Chievo in a 2–2 draw on 17 May 2009. At Genoa, Ferrari played under coach Gian Piero Gasperini and was a regular player in defence.

=== Beşiktaş ===
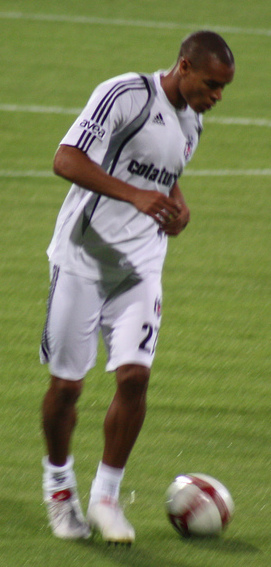
Ferrari training before the match preparation at Beşiktaş.

After one season at Genoa, Turkish side Beşiktaş were interested in signing him. Eventually, on 8 July 2009, it was confirmed that Ferrari transferred to Turkish club Beşiktaş for €4.5 million transfer fee. He signed a 4-year contract. His salary was €2.5 million per season, net of tax. On the opening day of the Turkish League, Ferrari made his debut for Beşiktas in a 1–1 draw against İstanbul B.B. on 7 August 2009. On 27 October 2009, Ferrari received a straight red card in a 2–1 win over Kasımpaşa. In September 2009, Ferrari had been one of the under-performing players for Besiktas and was expected to leave in the January transfer window. However, Ferrari didn't leave and remained at the club. In the 2010–11 season, Ferrari's playing time with the first team squad was limited under manager Bernd Schuster, and also Ferrari suffered a serious injury in the match against Bursaspor and was absent for two months. After some disputes, Ferrari notified the club to terminate the contract. From his point of view, the club had breached the contract after not allowing him to train with the team in pre-season. The club also notified Ferrari of his AWOL from training, which the club reserved the right to unilaterally terminate the contract. Following the release, both the player and the club filed lawsuits against each other for breach of contract.

The Court of Arbitration for Sport accepted the request from Ferrari and rejected the counter-claim from Beşiktaş. The court ordered Beşiktaş to pay Ferrari €7,256,641.95 for wage and medical expenses.

=== Montreal Impact ===
Following time away from Beşiktaş, Ferrari began training with Monza in Lega Pro Prima Divisione from 12 November 2011, until the end of December. Ferrari then proceeded to train with Inter Milan, the club where he began his football career.

While training with Inter Milan, the Montreal Impact organization invited Ferrari to the team's preseason training camp in Los Angeles, on 14 February 2012. During his tryout, Ferrari and the Impact organization began negotiating contractual terms so that Ferrari could join the club for its inaugural 2012 MLS season. On 1 March 2012, the Impact formally announced that he had signed with the club for the 2012 season.

On 11 May 2013, in a game against Real Salt Lake, Ferrari scored an own goal in the seventh minute to give RSL an early 1–0 lead. However, he redeemed himself by scoring a 93rd-minute winner in an eventual 3–2 win. That would turn out to be the only goal Ferrari scored for the Impact.

On 31 October 2014, Ferrari's option was declined on his contract.

== International career ==
=== Youth teams ===
Although he was also eligible to represent Algeria at international level, Ferrari chose to play for the Italy national football team. He also played for their U15, U16, U17, U18, U20, and U21 team, winning the 2000 UEFA European Under-21 Championship with the Italy U21 side.

=== Italy Olympic Team ===
Ferrari played at two Olympic Games with the Italy U23 side, in 2000 and in 2004.

In 2000, he only played in Italy's 1–0 quarter-final defeat to Spain. In 2004, he was one of the three over-age players permitted for Italy. He played in all of their matches as they lost 3–0 in the semi-finals to eventual champions Argentina, then won the Bronze Medal match 1–0 against Iraq.

=== Senior team ===
Ferrari's first senior call-up was in October 2002 under manager Giovanni Trapattoni, for a Euro 2004 qualifier against Serbia and Montenegro (as FR Yugoslavia), but he did not play in the 1–1 home draw. In the same year, he made his full debut in a 1–1 friendly home draw against Turkey in Pescara, on 20 November 2002. He played his first competitive international for Italy in a Euro 2004 qualifying match against Azerbaijan in Reggio Calabria, replacing Alessandro Nesta for the last 14 minutes in the 4–0 victory. His last cap for Italy came in a 4–0 friendly win against Tunisia in Tunis, on 30 May 2004, with Ferrari coming on for Fabio Cannavaro as a second-half substitute. He was called up for Euro 2004 by manager Trapattoni, but did not play in the tournament; Italy suffered a group-stage elimination, following a three-way five-point tie with Denmark and Sweden. Ferrari later received a single call-up from new coach Marcello Lippi in September for Italy's 2006 World Cup qualifying matches against Norway and Moldova, but did not play. In total, he collected 11 caps between 2002 and 2004.

== Career statistics ==
National team	Club	Season	Apps	Goals
Italy	Parma	2002–03	3	0
Italy	Parma	2003–04	8	0
Total			11	0

International appearances and goals
App	Date	Venue	Opponent	Result	Goal	Competition
	19 September 2000	Adelaide, Australia	Nigeria	1–1	0	2000 Olympics
1.	20 November 2002	Pescara, Italy	Turkey	1–1	0	Friendly
2.	30 April 2003	Geneva, Switzerland	Switzerland	2–1	0	Friendly
3.	3 June 2003	Campobasso, Italy	Northern Ireland	2–0	0	Friendly
4.	20 August 2003	Stuttgart, Germany	Germany	1–0	0	Friendly
5.	11 October 2003	Reggio Calabria, Italy	Azerbaijan	4–0	0	UEFA Euro 2004 qualifying
6.	12 November 2003	Warsaw, Poland	Poland	1–3	0	Friendly
7.	16 November 2003	Ancona, Italy	Romania	1–0	0	Friendly
8.	18 February 2001	Palermo, Italy	Czech Republic	2–2	0	Friendly
9.	31 March 2004	Braga, Portugal	Portugal	2–1	0	Friendly
10.	28 April 2004	Genoa, Italy	Spain	1–1	0	Friendly
11.	30 May 2004	Radès, Tunisia	Tunisia	4–0	0	Friendly
	12 August 2004	Volos, Greece	Ghana	2–2	0	2004 Olympics
	15 August 2004	Volos, Greece	Japan	3–2	0	2004 Olympics
	18 August 2004	Piraeus, Greece	Paraguay	0–1	0	2004 Olympics
	21 August 2004	Piraeus, Greece	Mali	1–0	0	2004 Olympics
	24 August 2004	Piraeus, Greece	Argentina	0–3	0	2004 Olympics
	27 August 2004	Thessaloniki, Greece	Iraq	1–0	0	2004 Olympics

== Honours ==
Parma

- Coppa Italia: 2001–02

Roma

- Coppa Italia: 2006–07, 2007–08
- Supercoppa Italiana: 2007

Beşiktaş

- Turkish Cup: 2010–11

Montreal Impact

- Canadian Championship: 2013, 2014

Italy Olympic

- Summer Olympics bronze medal: 2004

Orders

- 5th Class / Knight: Cavaliere Ordine al Merito della Repubblica Italiana: 2004
