= 2007 Coppa Italia final =

59th Coppa Italia final
- Event: 2006–07 Coppa Italia
Roma	Internazionale
7	4
- on aggregate

First leg
Roma	Internazionale
6	2
- Date: 9 May 2007
- Venue: Stadio Olimpico, Rome
- Referee: Massimiliano Saccani
- Attendance: 39,095
- Weather: Scattered clouds 19 °C (66 °F)

Second leg
Internazionale	Roma
2	1
- Date: 17 May 2007
- Venue: San Siro, Milan
- Referee: Emidio Morganti
- Attendance: 26,606
- Weather: Clear; 18 °C (64 °F)

The 2007 Coppa Italia final was the final of the 2006–07 Coppa Italia, the top cup competition in Italian football. The match was played over two legs between Roma and Internazionale. The first leg was played in Rome on 9 May 2007, while the second leg was held on 17 May. Roma won the trophy with an aggregate result of 7–4. This was the third final between the clubs, all played in consecutive years, the two having previously met in the 2005 and 2006 finals. Roma were playing in the final for the 14th time, while Inter were competing in their 10th final.

== First leg ==
9 May 2007
21:00 CEST

Roma	6–2	Internazionale
Totti 1'; De Rossi 5'; Perrotta 15'; Mancini 30'; Panucci 54', 89'	Report	Crespo 20', 57'

Stadio Olimpico, Rome
Attendance: 39,095
Referee: Massimiliano Saccani

Roma	Internazionale

GK	32	(Brazil) Doni
RB	2	(Italy) Christian Panucci
CB	5	(France) Philippe Mexès		(substituted off) 47'
CB	21	(Italy) Matteo Ferrari
LB	13	(Romania) Cristian Chivu
CM	16	(Italy) Daniele De Rossi
CM	7	(Chile) David Pizarro		(substituted off) 87'
RW	11	(Brazil) Rodrigo Taddei		(substituted off) 77'
AM	20	(Italy) Simone Perrotta
LW	30	(Brazil) Mancini	Booked
FW	10	(Italy) Francesco Totti (c)
Substitutes:
LB	77	(Italy) Marco Cassetti		(substituted in) 47'
CM	8	(Italy) Alberto Aquilani		(substituted in) 77'
LB	22	(Italy) Max Tonetto	Booked	(substituted in) 87'
Manager:
(Italy) Luciano Spalletti

GK	1	(Italy) Francesco Toldo
RB	13	(Brazil) Maicon	Booked
CB	23	(Italy) Marco Materazzi	Booked
CB	2	(Colombia) Iván Córdoba	Booked
LB	6	(Brazil) Maxwell		(substituted off) 68'
CM	4	(Argentina) Javier Zanetti (c)
CM	19	(Argentina) Esteban Cambiasso
CM	15	(France) Olivier Dacourt	Booked
AM	7	(Portugal) Luís Figo		(substituted off) 52'
FW	10	(Brazil) Adriano		(substituted off) 58'
FW	18	(Argentina) Hernán Crespo
Substitutes:
CM	14	(France) Patrick Vieira	Booked	(substituted in) 52'
FW	20	(Uruguay) Álvaro Recoba		(substituted in) 58'
LB	11	(Italy) Fabio Grosso		(substituted in) 68'
Manager:
(Italy) Roberto Mancini

== Second leg ==
17 May 2007
21:00 CEST

Internazionale	2–1	Roma
Cruz 51'; Crespo 57'	Report	Perrotta 88'

San Siro, Milan
Attendance: 26,606
Referee: Emidio Morganti

Internazionale	Roma

GK	1	(Italy) Francesco Toldo
RB	13	(Brazil) Maicon
CB	16	(Argentina) Nicolás Burdisso
CB	2	(Colombia) Iván Córdoba	(red card) 75'
LB	4	(Argentina) Javier Zanetti (c)
CM	14	(France) Patrick Vieira		(substituted off) 27'
CM	19	(Argentina) Esteban Cambiasso	Booked
CM	5	(Serbia) Dejan Stanković
RW	7	(Portugal) Luís Figo		(substituted off) 86'
LW	91	(Argentina) Mariano González		(substituted off) 58'
FW	18	(Argentina) Hernán Crespo
Substitutes:
FW	9	(Argentina) Julio Cruz		(substituted in) 27'
FW	20	(Uruguay) Álvaro Recoba		(substituted in) 58'
LB	6	(Brazil) Maxwell		(substituted in) 86'
Manager:
(Italy) Roberto Mancini

GK	32	(Brazil) Doni
RB	2	(Italy) Christian Panucci	(red card) 96'
CB	5	(France) Philippe Mexès
CB	21	(Italy) Matteo Ferrari
LB	13	(Romania) Cristian Chivu	Booked
CM	16	(Italy) Daniele De Rossi
CM	8	(Italy) Alberto Aquilani	Booked	(substituted off) 62'
RW	11	(Brazil) Rodrigo Taddei
AM	20	(Italy) Simone Perrotta	Booked
LW	30	(Brazil) Mancini		(substituted off) 83'
FW	10	(Italy) Francesco Totti (c)
Substitutes:
CM	7	(Chile) David Pizarro		(substituted in) 62'
LB	22	(Italy) Max Tonetto		(substituted in) 83'
Manager:
(Italy) Luciano Spalletti

== See also ==
- 2006–07 Inter Milan season
- 2006–07 AS Roma season

Played between same clubs:

- 2005 Coppa Italia final
- 2006 Coppa Italia final
- 2008 Coppa Italia final
- 2010 Coppa Italia final
