= 2008 Coppa Italia final =

60th Coppa Italia final
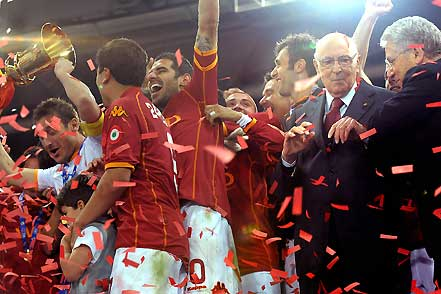
- Victorious Roma players with President of Italy Giorgio Napolitano
- Event: 2007–08 Coppa Italia
Roma	Internazionale
2	1
- Date: 24 May 2008
- Venue: Stadio Olimpico, Rome
- Referee: Emidio Morganti
- Attendance: 60,000
- Weather: Clear; 19 °C (66 °F)

The 2008 Coppa Italia final was the final match of the 2007–08 Coppa Italia, the top cup competition in Italian football. The match was played on 24 May 2008, between defending champions A.S. Roma and Internazionale at the Stadio Olimpico in Rome. This was the fourth consecutive and total final between these two clubs. Roma successfully defended their title as cup winners, defeating Inter by a score of 2–1. Roma qualified for the 2008 Supercoppa Italiana, for which Inter qualified regardless as Serie A champions.

For the first time since 1980 the final was played as a single match, theoretically on neutral territory although the Stadio Olimpico in Rome is the home ground of Roma.

== Match ==
24 May 2008
20:45 CEST

Roma	2–1	Internazionale
Mexès 36'; Perrotta 54'	Report	Pelé 60'

Stadio Olimpico, Rome
Attendance: 60,000
Referee: Emidio Morganti

Roma	Internazionale

GK	32	(Brazil) Doni
RB	77	(Italy) Marco Cassetti
CB	5	(France) Philippe Mexès
CB	4	(Brazil) Juan
LB	22	(Italy) Max Tonetto
CM	16	(Italy) Daniele De Rossi (c)
CM	7	(Chile) David Pizarro
LW	8	(Italy) Alberto Aquilani		(substituted off) 90'
AM	20	(Italy) Simone Perrotta	(yellow card) 56'	(substituted off) 72'
RW	14	(France) Ludovic Giuly		(substituted off) 66'
CF	9	(Montenegro) Mirko Vučinić	(yellow card) 74'
Substitutes:
GK	1	(Italy) Gianluca Curci
DF	2	(Italy) Christian Panucci		(substituted in) 90'
LB	15	(Portugal) Vitorino Antunes
RB	3	(Brazil) Cicinho		(substituted in) 66'
DM	33	(Italy) Matteo Brighi		(substituted in) 72'
FW	30	(Brazil) Mancini
FW	18	(Italy) Mauro Esposito
Manager:
(Italy) Luciano Spalletti

GK	1	(Italy) Francesco Toldo	(yellow card) 54'
RB	13	(Brazil) Maicon
CB	26	(Romania) Cristian Chivu
CB	16	(Argentina) Nicolás Burdisso	(yellow card) 87'
LB	6	(Brazil) Maxwell
RM	4	(Argentina) Javier Zanetti (c)		(substituted off) 90'
CM	14	(France) Patrick Vieira	(yellow card) 61'
CM	5	(Serbia) Dejan Stanković		(substituted off) 46'
LM	31	(Brazil) César		(substituted off) 62'
CF	29	(Honduras) David Suazo
CF	45	(Italy) Mario Balotelli
Substitutes:
GK	12	(Brazil) Júlio César
DF	40	(Montenegro) Ivan Fatić
MF	30	(Portugal) Pélé	(yellow card) 87'	(substituted in) 46'
MF	21	(Argentina) Santiago Solari
MF	11	(Chile) Luis Jiménez		(substituted in) 62'
MF	28	(Portugal) Maniche
FW	18	(Argentina) Hernán Crespo		(substituted in) 90'
Manager:
(Italy) Roberto Mancini

== See also ==
- 2007–08 Inter Milan season
- 2007–08 AS Roma season

Played between same clubs:

- 2005 Coppa Italia final
- 2006 Coppa Italia final
- 2007 Coppa Italia final
- 2010 Coppa Italia final
