= Philippe Mexès =

French footballer (born 1982)

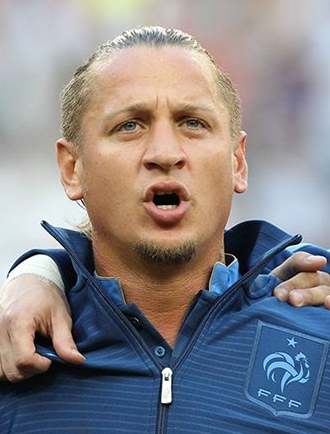
- Mexès lining up for France at UEFA Euro 2012

Personal information
- Full name: Philippe Mexès
- Date of birth: 30 March 1982 (age 44)
- Place of birth: Toulouse, France
- Height: 1.87 m (6 ft 2 in)
- Position: Centre-back

Youth career
- 1987–1990: Toulouse-Mirail
- 1990–1997: Toulouse
- 1997–1999: Auxerre

Senior career*
Years	Team	Apps	(Gls)
1999–2004	Auxerre	171	(8)
2004–2011	Roma	267	(15)
2011–2016	AC Milan	114	(7)
Total		552	(30)

International career
1997–1998	France U16	7	(2)
1998–2000	France U18	8	(1)
2001–2002	France U21	5	(0)
2002–2012	France	29	(1)
Medal record
Representing France
FIFA Confederations Cup
Winner	2003
UEFA European Under-21 Championship
Runner-up	2002
UEFA European Under-19 Championship
Winner	2000
- * Club domestic league appearances and goals

Philippe Mexès (born 30 March 1982) is a French former professional footballer who played as a centre-back. He represented Auxerre, Roma and AC Milan at club level during a career that spanned between 1999 and 2016. A full international between 2002 and 2012, he won 29 caps and scored one goal for the France national team and represented them at the 2003 FIFA Confederations Cup as well as UEFA Euro 2012.

== Club career ==
=== Auxerre ===
Mexès was born in Toulouse, Haute-Garonne. He began his youth career at Auxerre, at age 12. He began training at Bastille, the youth team, where he quickly became one of the key players for youth squads in which he captained them to many cups. With the senior squad, he won the 2003 Coupe de France.

=== Roma ===
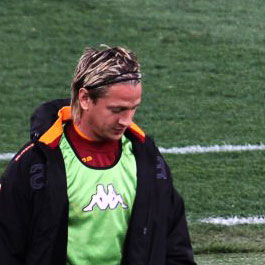
Mexès with Roma in 2010

Mexès was signed to a four-year contract by Roma in June 2004. Roma was later found guilty of misconduct, as AJ Auxerre, his previous club, did not agree to the transfer; it was solely the decision of the player. Mexès was suspended, but later the ban was temporarily lifted. Mexès played his first Serie A match on 12 September 2004 against Fiorentina. In February 2005, the appeal on the six-week ban was rejected and Mexès was suspended until April. The saga was eventually settled by Mexès, or Roma would have had to pay Auxerre €7 million.

After a difficult first season with the Capitoline club, Mexès began the 2005–06 campaign on the bench. Roma's transfer misconduct in the purchase of Mexès led to the club's being suspended in 2005 from signing players other than free agents, but the ban temporarily lifted in August. As the club did not sign anyone due to the ban, he became a key player for Luciano Spalletti's squad. Mexès played nine out of a possible ten games for Roma in UEFA Cup competitions. He also played in the final of 2005–06 Coppa Italia. The Giallorossi finished fifth in Serie A, initially qualifying only for the next year's UEFA Cup, but due to the 2006 Italian football scandal, Roma were awarded second, allowing Mexès to play for the first time in the UEFA Champions League.

As one of the key players of Roma, he formed a central defensive partnership with Cristian Chivu. The club reached the 2006–07 UEFA Champions League quarter-finals. The club faced Inter Milan again at 2007 Coppa Italia final. Mexès, partnering with Matteo Ferrari, Cristian Chivu, and Christian Panucci on defence, helped Roma to a 7–4 aggregate victory, including a 6–2 first leg win. The Giallorossi also finished second in Serie A with the third lowest goals conceded total.

Mexès signed a new five-year contract, in which he would earn €4.5 million in the first year, increasing to €5 million by the last year, in gross annual salary (pre-taxed salary). The Giallorossi reached the 2007–08 UEFA Champions League quarter-finals for the second straight year, but lost to eventual champions Manchester United for the second time in the same year. In Serie A, Roma narrowed an 11-point gap with Inter and eventually finished second behind Inter, three points back. At the 2008 Coppa Italia final, Mexès scored the opening goal for Roma, and the Giallorossi went on to win 2–1, defending their title.

With Mexès in defence, Roma qualified for the knockout stage of the 2008–09 UEFA Champions League. Mexès missed the second leg against Arsenal and Roma lost in 6–7 penalty shoot-out. Roma's defence, however, conceded the fifth highest number of goals in Serie A.

In Roma's first UEFA Europa League match on 30 July 2009, Mexès scored on a Francesco Totti free kick, giving Roma a draw. Although he received slightly less playing time with the arrival of Nicolás Burdisso on loan from Inter, Mexès contributed to a defence, which helped Roma finish second in Serie A. In the latter part of 2010, he reclaimed his spot in the team.

On 3 April 2011, Mexès had to be substituted early in the second half in a Serie A match with Juventus, because of an injury to his left knee. After the match, it was revealed that he had cruciate ligament damage. Two days after the injury, he came through a successful operation. In an interview after his operation, Mexès responded to speculation that he had played his last match for Roma. With his contract due to expire in June 2011, he hinted that he would be leaving, likely to sign with AC Milan.

=== AC Milan ===
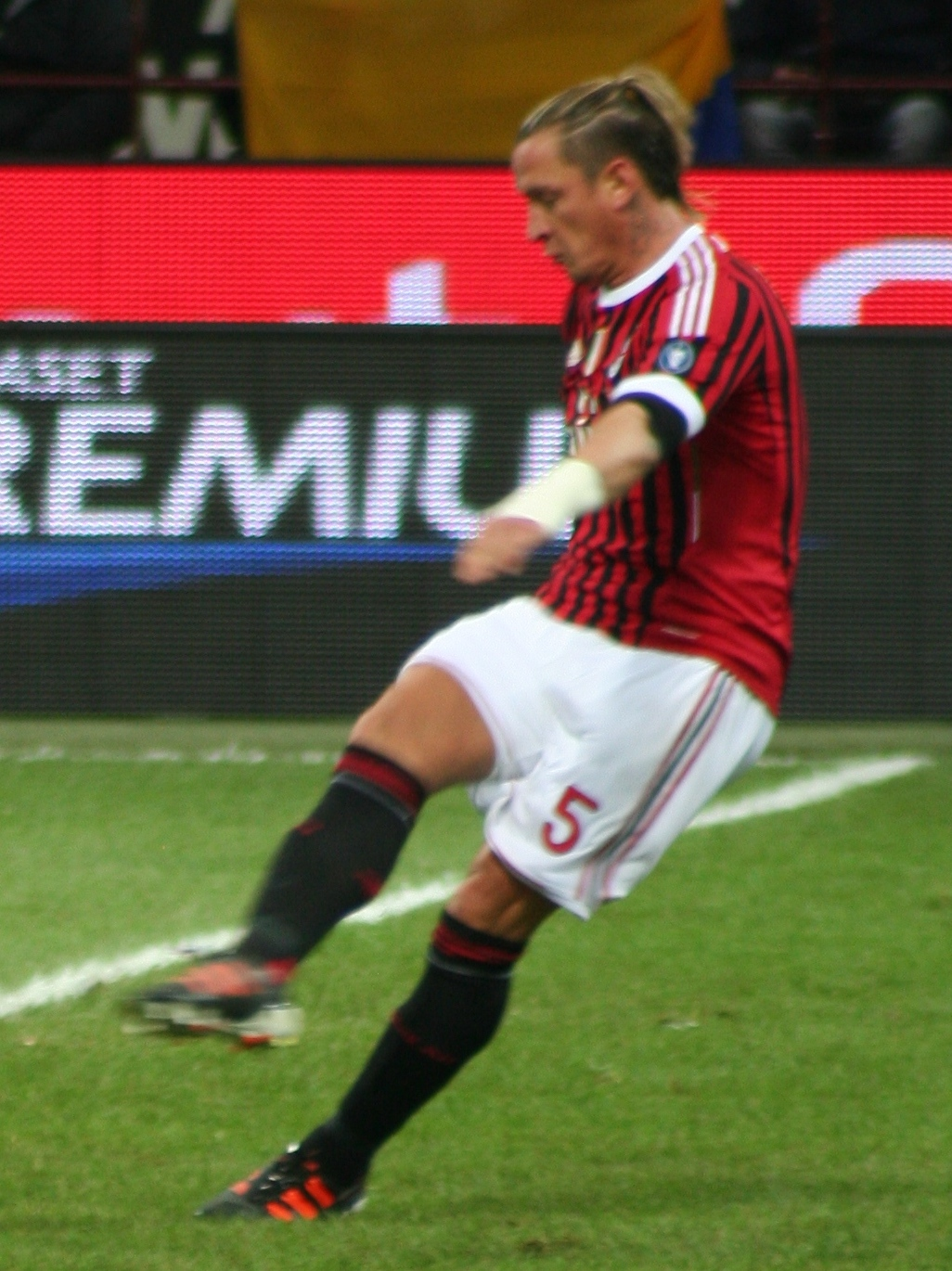
Mexès playing for AC Milan in 2011

On 10 May 2011, Milan CEO Adriano Galliani announced that Mexès would play for Milan the following season, stating the completion of a transfer for Mexès.

Mexès was handed the squad number 5, the same number he had at Roma. He played his first unofficial match for the club in their Primavera, the youth team of Milan. He played only 45 minutes as the game was intended as to aid his recovery from his long term knee injury. On 26 October 2011, he made his debut in Serie A with Milan, in the home match won 4–1 against Parma. He made 24 appearances for Milan in his debut season, and was the club's third choice central defender behind starting duo Alessandro Nesta and Thiago Silva.

The next season, both Nesta and Silva had left the club, while Villareal's Cristián Zapata had been brought in. Mexès and Zapata became Milan's first choice central defensive duo and conceded just 12 goals in the second half of the 2012–13 Serie A season. Mexès scored his first goal for Milan with a spectacular bicycle kick from 20 metres on 21 November 2012, in a 2012–13 UEFA Champions League group match against Anderlecht that was rated one of the best goals of the year. Mexès scored his first goal for Milan in Serie A on 20 May 2013, in the last minutes of the game, giving Milan a third-place finish in the league and their qualification for next year's Champions League.

Mexès scored his first goal of the 2013–14 season in a 3–1 home win against Cagliari, scoring the second goal of the match in the 30th minute of play. He remained a key part of Milan's back four during the season. In a Serie A match against Juventus, Mexès received a second bookable offence late on in the game for a punch on Juventus' Giorgio Chiellini, a punch which subsequently earned him a four match suspension.

On 8 July 2015, Milan announced Mexès had signed a contract extension to keep him at the club until 2016. In November 2015, Mexès was nominated for the FIFA Puskás Award for his goal in an International Champions Cup friendly match against Inter, a well struck volley from the edge of the area, on 25 July 2015.

On 14 May 2016, Mexès played his last game for AC Milan in a 3–1 loss against AS Roma at San Siro, in which he was also the team's captain. A week later, he was on the bench for the 2016 Coppa Italia final against Juventus but did not play.

On 25 May 2016, club owner Silvio Berlusconi announced his departure, along with those of Kevin-Prince Boateng and Mario Balotelli. After leaving Milan, he did not find any club for over a year. In November 2017, he announced his retirement.

== International career ==
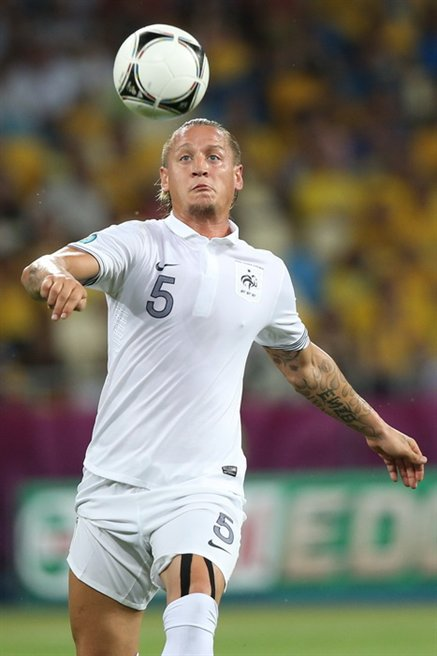
Mexès playing for France at UEFA Euro 2012

Mexès played for the under-18 and under-21 France national teams, as well as the senior team, where he was a squad member at the UEFA Euro 2012 competition.

== Personal life ==
Mexès and his ex-wife, Carla, have two children together, born in 2003 and 2007. He has another child (born 2012) with his current wife, Véronique.

== Media ==
Mexès features in EA Sports' FIFA video game series; he was on the cover of the Italian edition of FIFA 12, alongside Giampaolo Pazzini, and global cover star Wayne Rooney.

== Career statistics ==
=== Club ===
Appearances and goals by club, season and competition
Club	Season	League			Cup		Europe		Other		Total	
Club	Season	Division	Apps	Goals	Apps	Goals	Apps	Goals	Apps	Goals	Apps	Goals
Auxerre	1999–2000	Division 1	5	0	1	0	—		—		6	0
Auxerre	2000–01	Division 1	32	0	4	0	3 (Note: Appearances in UEFA Intertoto Cup)	0	—		39	0
Auxerre	2001–02	Division 1	30	3	2	0	—		—		32	3
Auxerre	2002–03	Ligue 1	34	1	4	0	11 (Note: Appearances in UEFA Champions League)	0	—		49	1
Auxerre	2003–04	Ligue 1	32	3	5	0	8 (Note: Appearances in UEFA Cup)	1	—		45	4
Auxerre	Total		133	7	16	0	22	1	—		168	8
Roma	2004–05	Serie A	28	0	6	1	3	0	—		37	1
Roma	2005–06	Serie A	27	3	7	0	9	0	—		43	3
Roma	2006–07	Serie A	27	3	6	0	7	0	1 (Note: Appearance in Supercoppa Italiana)	0	41	3
Roma	2007–08	Serie A	31	1	4	1	9	0	1	0	45	2
Roma	2008–09	Serie A	29	2	2	0	6	0	1	0	38	2
Roma	2009–10	Serie A	19	1	4	1	9 (Note: Appearances in UEFA Europa League)	0	—		32	2
Roma	2010–11	Serie A	22	1	3	0	6	1	—		31	2
Roma	Total		183	11	32	3	49	1	3	0	267	15
AC Milan	2011–12	Serie A	14	0	3	0	6	0	1	0	24	0
AC Milan	2012–13	Serie A	25	1	1	0	6	1	—		32	2
AC Milan	2013–14	Serie A	22	2	2	0	7	0	—		31	2
AC Milan	2014–15	Serie A	20	2	0	0	—		—		20	2
AC Milan	2015–16	Serie A	5	1	2	0	—		—		7	1
AC Milan	Total		86	6	9	0	19	1	1	0	114	7
Career total			402	24	56	3	90	3	4	0	549	30

=== International ===
Appearances and goals by national team and year
National team	Year	Apps	Goals
France	2002	2	0
France	2003	3	0
France	2004	1	0
France	2007	2	0
France	2008	3	0
France	2009	2	0
France	2010	6	0
France	2011	3	1
France	2012	7	0
Total		29	1

France score listed first, score column indicates score after each Mexès goal

International goals by date, venue, opponent, score, result and competition
No.	Date	Venue	Opponent	Score	Result	Competition	Ref.
1	25 March 2011	Stade Josy Barthel, Luxembourg City, Luxembourg	Luxembourg	1–0	2–0	UEFA Euro 2012 qualification	

== Honours ==
Auxerre

- Coupe de France: 2002–03

Roma

- Coppa Italia: 2006–07, 2007–08
- Supercoppa Italiana: 2007

AC Milan

- Supercoppa Italiana: 2011

France U18

- UEFA European Under-18 Championship: 2000

France

- FIFA Confederations Cup: 2003

Individual

- Ligue 1 Team of the Year: 2002–03
- UEFA Champions League Squad of the Season: 2007–08
