= Simone Perrotta =

Italian-British footballer (born 1977)

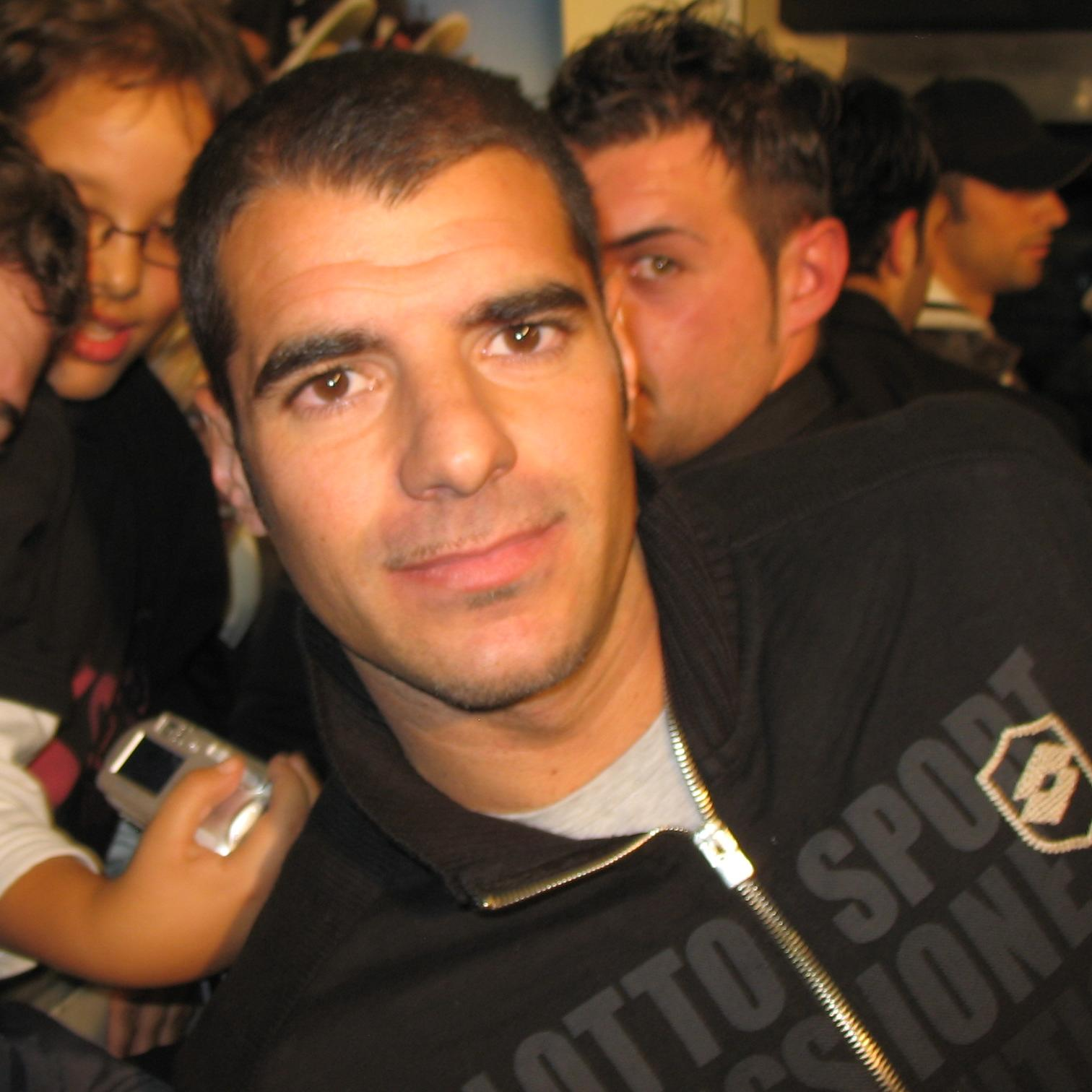
- Perrotta in 2007

Personal information
- Full name: Simone Perrotta
- Date of birth: 17 September 1977 (age 49)
- Place of birth: Ashton-under-Lyne, England
- Height: 1.78 m (5 ft 10 in)
- Position: Midfielder

Senior career*
Years	Team	Apps	(Gls)
1995–1998	Reggina	77	(1)
1998–1999	Juventus	5	(0)
1999–2001	Bari	56	(1)
2001–2004	Chievo	95	(6)
2004–2013	Roma	245	(36)
Total		478	(44)

International career
1998–2000	Italy U21	6	(1)
2002–2009	Italy	48	(2)
Medal record
Men's football
Representing Italy
FIFA World Cup
Winner	2006 Germany
- * Club domestic league appearances and goals

Simone Perrotta Ufficiale OMRI (Italian pronunciation: [siˈmoːne perˈrɔtta]; born 17 September 1977) is a former professional footballer who played as a midfielder. Born in England, he represented the Italy national team. Throughout his career, he stood out for his work rate, energy, and box-to-box play as a ball-winner in the midfield area. After initially playing for Italian sides Reggina, Juventus, Bari, and Chievo, Perrotta went on to spend most of his career with Serie A club Roma, until his retirement on 29 June 2013; he won consecutive Coppa Italia titles with the club in 2007 and 2008, as well as the 2007 Supercoppa Italiana.

He played for Italy on 48 occasions between 2002 and 2009, and was a member of the team that won the 2006 FIFA World Cup. Perrotta also represented Italy in two UEFA European Championships.

== Club career ==
=== Early career: Reggina and Juventus ===
Perrotta was born in Ashton-under-Lyne, England, in the same hospital as England's 1966 World Cup winner Geoff Hurst. He grew up in the youth system of Reggina and debuted in Serie B in 1995, becoming an important fixture in their line-up. In 1998, Juventus decided to sign him; however, due to the presence of several more experienced and world-class midfielders ahead of him on the team, such as Antonio Conte, Didier Deschamps, Edgar Davids, Alessio Tacchinardi, and Zinedine Zidane, he struggled to gain playing time, and only made five league appearances for the Turin club, and 15 in total. Despite his limited space at the club, he was able to score a goal in the Coppa Italia, make his Champions League debut, and appeared in the 1999 UEFA Intertoto Cup, which Juventus went on to win, before being sent out on loan to Bari.

=== Bari ===
In 1999, Perrotta was farmed to Bari in a co-ownership deal for 3 billion Italian lire (or €1,549,371), as part of Gianluca Zambrotta's deal, where he played for two seasons, breaking into the first team. In June 2001, Bari acquired him outright for approximately €300,000, making Juventus booked a financial cost of €1.25 million for the discount.

=== Chievo ===
At the start of 2001–02 Serie A, following Bari's relegation from Serie A, he was shipped to Chievo, where he remained for three seasons, and made a name for himself as one of Italy's best midfielders. Alongside Eugenio Corini, he was a mainstay in the midfield of a surprising newly promoted Chievo squad that was first place at the winter break, and finished the season in fifth place under manager Luigi Delneri, qualifying for the UEFA Cup. He even provided the winning assist in their famous victory over Internazionale that season. Despite his consistent performances, his next two seasons at the club were less successful, due to the departure of several key players, as Chievo finished seventh in Serie A during the 2002–03 season, and ninth in Serie A during the 2003–04 season.

=== Roma ===
In 2004, Roma signed him from the Veneto club for €7.2 million on a four-year instalment. The deal was later changed to three instalments, however; new Roma signing Matteo Brighi, valued at €16 million was loaned to Chievo for the season as part of the deal. and then discounted to €7.05 million, His first season at the club saw him play in a supporting role as a defensive midfielder, behind the attacking trio made up of Francesco Totti, Antonio Cassano, and Vincenzo Montella; however, the season was largely unsuccessful, as Roma underwent several managerial changes, suffered a first round elimination in the UEFA Champions League, finished eighth in Serie A, and lost out to Inter in the 2005 Coppa Italia final.

The following season saw the arrival of Luciano Spalletti as Roma's new head coach. Under Spalletti's 4–2–3–1 formation, Perrotta played in a more advanced role, behind the first striker and in between the left and right winger as an attacking central midfielder, in which he was able to rediscover his form, becoming a key member of Roma's midfield, as Roma reached the 2006 Coppa Italia final. On merit of his fine performances for the capital club, he earned a call-up to Marcello Lippi's Italy squad for the 2006 FIFA World Cup, starting all seven games for the eventual champions. In 2006, he also signed a contract extension with the capital club, keeping him in Rome until 2010.

Perrotta continued to excel in this more advanced role under Spalletti, and scored 13 goals in all competitions during the 2006–07 season, as he won the Coppa Italia title in 2007, finishing as the tournament's top scorer; the following season, he helped Roma to defend title, and also won the 2007 Supercoppa Italiana, in which he was sent off.

Perrotta signed a new one-year extension to his contract with Roma in October 2009, extending his stay at the club until 2011. In March 2011, he signed another contract, with basic salary decreased to €2.5 million per season.

For the 2011–12 season, Perrotta was usually used as a central midfielder alongside Daniele De Rossi and Miralem Pjanić. On 20 February 2012, Perrotta signed a new one-year extension to his contract with Roma that will keep him at the club until 2013. Perrotta's fixed gross fee for the current season was raised to €2.6 million plus performance bonuses. He played 20 matches in the 2011–12 season, failing to score a goal.

After almost two years without scoring, he scored against Siena on 2 December 2012, giving Roma a 1–2 lead away. Roma eventually won the game 1–3, with a brace from Mattia Destro. He scored again on 3 March 2013, also in a 3–1 win, against Genoa at the Stadio Olimpico. He was substituted on for striker Dani Osvaldo in the 81st minute, and eight minutes later, in the 89th minute, he scored a goal that sealed the match. After the appointment of Aurelio Andreazzoli as caretaker manager, he received significantly more playing time than under the Czech Zdeněk Zeman. He finished the season with 16 league appearances, only four as a starter, with two goals scored; under manager Aurelio Andreazzoli, he was left on the bench in Roma's 1–0 Coppa Italia final defeat to cross-city rivals Lazio. On 29 June 2013, Perrotta announced his retirement from professional football.

== International career ==
Perrotta was eligible to play for both Italy and England – the latter due to his birth in the country (in addition to being Italian, he is automatically a British citizen as the United Kingdom granted unconditional birthright citizenship until 1983). Perrotta made his debut for the Italy under-21 team under Marco Tardelli, making 6 appearances and scoring a goal. He won the 2000 UEFA European Under-21 Football Championship, appearing in Italy's 2–1 victory over the Czech Republic in the final, but was later dropped from the 2000 Summer Olympics squad due to injury. He made his senior international debut under Giovanni Trapattoni, on 20 November 2002, in a 1–1 draw against Turkey. He subsequently played for Italy at UEFA Euro 2004, scoring a goal in a 2–1 win against Bulgaria, although the Italy national side were eliminated in the first round of the tournament on direct-encounters following a three-way five point tie with Denmark and Sweden.

Perrotta also represented the Italy national team during the 2006 FIFA World Cup under coach Marcello Lippi, starting in all seven of the Azzurri's games, including the final, en route to their fourth World Cup title, setting up Filippo Inzaghi's goal in a 2–0 win over the Czech Republic in Italy's final group match of the tournament on 22 June. Unlike with Roma, Perrotta was often used as a left winger with the Italy national team under Lippi, or as a "front-lying" defensive midfielder, as he was in the 2006 World Cup.

Under new manager Roberto Donadoni, Perrotta scored his second goal for Italy in a 3–1 away win over Georgia in a Euro 2008 qualifying match on 11 October 2006. He made his first appearance as Italy captain on 21 November 2007, in the second half of a 3–1 home win over the Faroe Islands, in a European qualifier. He went on to take part at UEFA Euro 2008, often appearing as an attacking midfielder, where Italy lost out to eventual champions Spain on penalties in the quarter-finals.

In 2009, after being left out from 2010 FIFA World Cup squad by Marcello Lippi, he retired from international football; he made his final appearance for Italy on 10 February 2009, in a 2–0 friendly defeat to Brazil, at the Emirates Stadium. In total he made 48 appearances for Italy, scoring two goals.

== Style of play ==
A quick, physically strong, energetic, tenacious, and hard-working two-way player, Perrotta was known for his pace, versatility, and consistency, as well as his stamina, box-to-box play, and hard-running style. His wide range of skills allowed him to play anywhere in midfield. He was usually used in the centre, and often in a holding role in front of the defence, where he was adept at pressing opponents, breaking down plays, and subsequently distributing the ball to team-mates after winning back possession, or even linking up with other players through his passing to help start attacks. However, throughout his career, he was also deployed in other roles; for example, he was also used in a more offensive central midfield role, known as a mezzala in Italian football jargon, due to his movement. With the Italy national football team, under manager Marcello Lippi, he was used out wide as a defensive winger in a 4–4–1–1 formation during the 2006 World Cup, due to his work-rate and crossing ability; he was also later used in a similar role under his Roma manager Claudio Ranieri. Under his Roma manager Luciano Spalletti, he was even fielded in a more advanced role during the 2006–07 season, as a false attacking midfielder behind the team's lone striker Francesco Totti in a 4–2–3–1 formation, the latter of whom acted as a false nine; this change of position was effective, due to Perrotta's movement off the ball, eye for goal from midfield, and ability to make late attacking runs into the penalty box, despite not being the most naturally technically gifted player in his position.

== Personal life ==
Perrotta is of Calabrian origins and was born in England. He lived in England until the age of five, attending the former St Ann's RC Primary School on Burlington Street in the electoral ward of St Peter's in Ashton-under-Lyne. His parents, Francesco and Anna Maria, ran a pub in Ashton and lived on Fitzroy Street and briefly at the Chiltern Chapel before moving back to Italy in 1982, to their hometown Cerisano, near Cosenza. He is married and he has a son called Peter.

On 22 December 2010, a statue of Perrotta was unveiled in Ashton-under-Lyne, close to Curzon Ashton F.C.'s Tameside Stadium in the Roy Oldham Sports Village, Richmond Street. The triple sculpture by Andrew Edwards and Sculpture For Sport commemorates the three men from the borough of Tameside who hold World Cup winner's medals: Geoff Hurst, Jimmy Armfield, and Perrotta. He speaks English and Italian.

== Career statistics ==
=== Club ===
Club	Season	League			Cup		Continental		Total	
Club	Season	Division	Apps	Goals	Apps	Goals	Apps	Goals	Apps	Goals
Reggina	1995–96	Serie B	22	0	—		—		22	0
Reggina	1996–97	Serie B	29	0	—		—		29	0
Reggina	1997–98	Serie B	26	1	—		—		26	1
Juventus	1998–99	Serie A	7	0	6	1	1	0	14	1
Juventus	1999–2000	Serie A	0	0	0	0	1	0	1	0
Bari	1999–2000	Serie A	31	1	—		—		31	1
Bari	2000–01	Serie A	25	0	0	0	—		25	0
Chievo	2001–02	Serie A	32	4	3	1	—		35	5
Chievo	2002–03	Serie A	32	1	0	0	2	0	34	1
Chievo	2003–04	Serie A	31	1	0	0	—		31	1
Roma	2004–05	Serie A	30	3	5	0	4	0	39	3
Roma	2005–06	Serie A	35	5	5	2	7	1	47	8
Roma	2006–07	Serie A	34	8	7	4	9	1	50	13
Roma	2007–08	Serie A	29	5	6	1	6	1	41	7
Roma	2008–09	Serie A	25	5	2	0	6	0	33	5
Roma	2009–10	Serie A	32	5	3	0	5	1	40	5
Roma	2010–11	Serie A	26	3	3	0	6	1	34	4
Roma	2011–12	Serie A	19	0	2	0	2	1	23	1
Roma	2012–13	Serie A	16	2	1	0	0	0	17	2
Roma	Total		246	36	33	7	44	6	326	49
Career total			479	44	43	9	48	6	573	59

=== International ===
Italy national team
Year	Apps	Goals
2002	1	0
2003	11	0
2004	9	1
2005	0	0
2006	12	1
2007	5	0
2008	8	0
2009	2	0
Total	48	2

Scores and results list Italy's goal tally first.

#	Date	Venue	Opponent	Score	Result	Competition
1	22 June 2004	Estádio D. Afonso Henriques, Guimarães, Portugal	Bulgaria	1–1	2–1	UEFA Euro 2004
2	11 October 2006	Boris Paichadze Stadium, Tbilisi, Georgia	Georgia	3–1	3–1	UEFA Euro 2008 qualifying

== Honours ==
=== Club ===
Roma

- Coppa Italia: 2006–07, 2007–08
- Supercoppa Italiana: 2007

=== International ===
Italy

- FIFA World Cup: 2006
- UEFA Under-21 European Championship: 2000

=== Individual ===
- Coppa Italia Top scorer: 2006–07

=== Orders ===
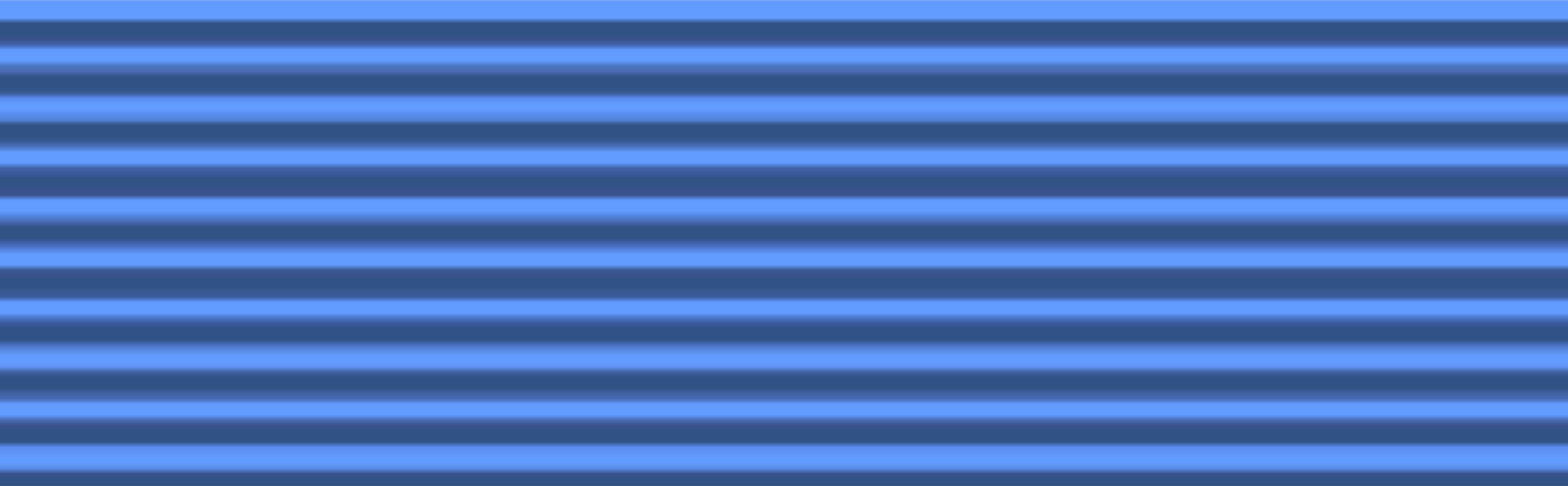
- CONI: Golden Collar of Sports Merit: 2006

- 4th Class / Officer: Ufficiale Ordine al Merito della Repubblica Italiana: 2006
