= Emidio Morganti =

Italian football referee

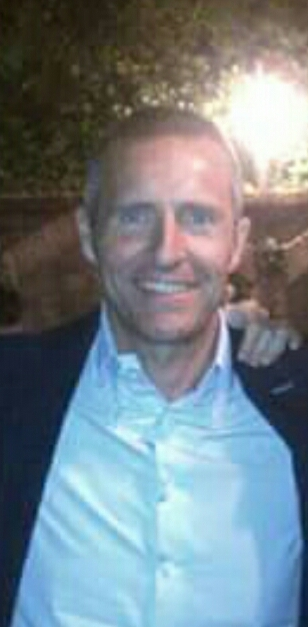
- Emidio Morganti
- Full name: Emidio Morganti
- Born: 23 July 1966 (age 60); Ascoli Piceno, Italy
- Other occupation: Football referee

Domestic
Years	League	Role
1997–2000	Serie C	Referee
2000–2010	Serie A and B	Referee
2000–2011	Serie A	Referee

Emidio Morganti (born 23 July 1966 in Ascoli Piceno) is an Italian former football referee.

== Career ==
Throughout his career, Morganti officiated three Coppa Italia final matches: the second leg of the 2007 edition of the final between Roma and Inter (Inter won the match 2–1, but lost the final 7–4 on aggregate), the 2008 final between the same opponents (2–1), and the 2011 final between Inter and Palermo (3–1). He also officiated the 2009 Supercoppa Italiana between Inter and Lazio at the Beijing National Stadium (1–2). He won the Serie A Referee of the Year award in 2010. He retired in 2011, after reaching the FIGC refereeing age limit of 45.

== Honours ==
- Serie A Referee of the Year: 2010
- Giovanni Mauro Award for Best Italian International Referee of the Season: 2008
