= 2006–07 Coppa Italia =

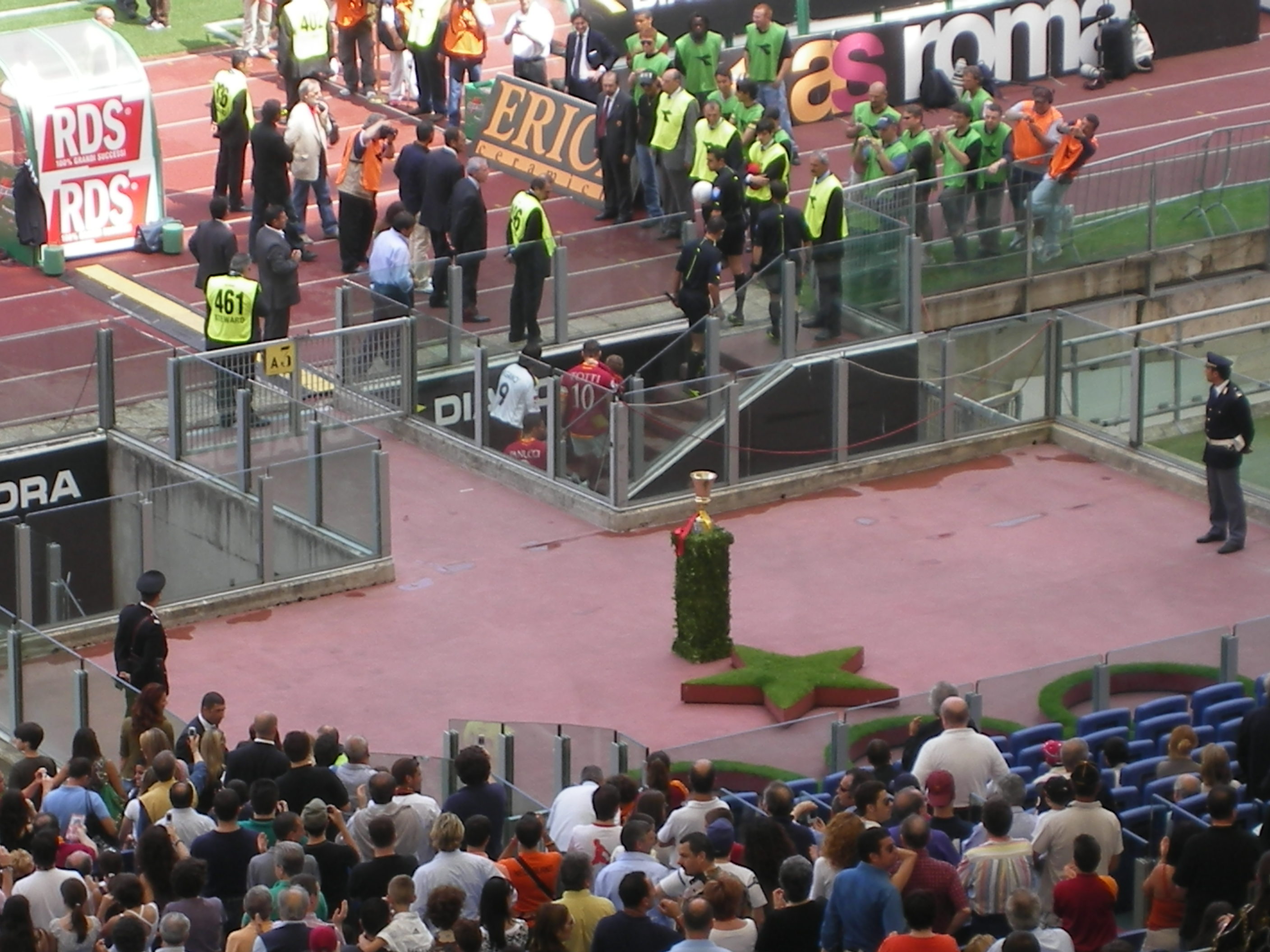
- The Coppa Italia 2006–07, shown during the last AS Roma's match of the season in the Stadio Olimpico

Tournament details
- Country: Italy
- Dates: 19 Aug 2006 – 17 May 2007
- Teams: 72

Final positions
- Champions: Roma (8th title)
- Runners-up: Internazionale

Tournament statistics
- Matches played: 86
- Goals scored: 293 (3.41 per match)
- Top goal scorer(s): Emiliano Bonazzoli; Francesco Flachi; Nicolás Burdisso; Hernán Crespo; Simone Perrotta; Giuseppe Greco (4 goals)

The 2006–07 Coppa Italia, also known as TIM Cup for sponsorship reasons, was the 60th edition of the national domestic tournament. The final was played, like the two previous editions, between Internazionale and Roma. The first match was played in Rome on 9 May 2007, and the second leg in Milan on 17 May 2007. The score of the first leg was a 6–2 win for Roma, while in the second leg Inter beat Roma 2–1, crowning Roma for the eighth time the tournament cup title cup.

== Formula ==
The match format introduced in the 2005–06 season continued for the season. Participating in the competition were all the teams from Serie A (20 teams) and B (22 teams), 28 teams from Serie C1 and C2, and 2 teams from non professional leagues ("Dilettanti"), 72 teams in total. The first three rounds were all one-game matches, with the lower classified team in the previous year playing at home. Only 64 teams participated in the first round; the eight teams from Serie A that qualified for European competitions joined the competition in the fourth round – the round of 16. Once the third round was finished, only 8 of the original 64 teams survived and these teams were paired against the 8 teams that had not yet participated. From this point on, the rounds, including the final, were all double leg home and away with the team having the higher aggregate score advancing.

== Pairing Teams ==
No draws were made to pair the teams. In the first round, seed 72 played seed 9, seed 71 played seed 10 and so on. In the second and all future rounds, all brackets were fixed with no reseeding in case of upset winners. To see how teams were paired in the second round, assume no upsets and the top seed would again play the bottom seed; seed 40 (or its opponent seed 41) would play seed 9 (or its opponent seed 72), 39 (or 42) would play 10 (or 71) and so on.

== Seeding teams ==
Seeding was allocated as follows:

a) seed 1 to last year's Cup Winner

b) seeds 2–8 to the participants playing in the Champions League/UEFA Cup competitions other than seed 1. If less than 8 teams are participating then the next highest placed Serie A team(s) complete(s) the list.

c) seeds 9–17 to the 9 remaining Serie A teams to 17th place.

d) seeds 18–20 to the 3 Serie B teams promoted to Serie A this season.

e) seeds 21–23 to the 3 Serie A teams demoted to Serie B this season.

f) seeds 24–37 to the 14 Serie B teams finishing to 17th place but not promoted to Serie A, and seed 38 to the play-out winner in Serie B

g) seeds 39–42 to the 4 Serie C1 teams promoted to Serie B this season.

h) seeds 43–46 to the 4 Serie B teams demoted to Serie C1 this season.

i) seeds 47–70 to 24 teams from Serie C1 and Serie C2 as selected by the league

j) seeds 71–72 to 2 teams from the Lega Nazionale Dilettanti (below C2) as selected by the league.

=== Preliminary rounds ===
==== Top quarter ====
First Round
64	Sansovino	0
17	Messina	1
49	Grosseto	3
32	Piacenza	4
65	Rende	0
16	Lazio	4
48	Monza	1
33	Bari	0

Second Round
17	Messina	2
32	Piacenza	0
16	Lazio	1(3)**
48	Monza	1(2)

Third Round
17	Messina	4*
16	Lazio	3

First Round
57	Novara	1
24	Mantova	2
56	Teramo	0
25	Modena	3
72	Giarre	0
9	Fiorentina	3
41	Genoa	3
40	Spezia	2

Second Round
24	Mantova	1(3)
25	Modena	1(4)**
9	Fiorentina	0
41	Genoa	1

Third Round
25	Modena	1
41	Genoa	3*

==== Second quarter ====
First Round
60	Cavese	2
21	Lecce	1
53	Cittadella	1
28	Bologna	2*
69	Benevento	0
12	Sampdoria	2
44	Ternana	0
37	Rimini	2*

Second Round
60	Cavese	0
28	Bologna	2
12	Sampdoria	2
37	Rimini	1

Third Round
28	Bologna	2
12	Sampdoria	3

First Round
61	Ivrea	0
20	Torino	3
52	Sangiovannese	1
29	Crotone	3*
68	Pro Vasto	1
13	Reggina	3*
45	Cremonese	1
36	Vicenza	0

Second Round
20	Torino	1
29	Crotone	2
13	Reggina	1
45	Cremonese	0

Third Round
29	Crotone	0
13	Reggina	1*

==== Third quarter ====
First Round
62	Taranto	2
19	Catania	0
51	Salernitana	2
30	Brescia	3
67	Cuneo	0
14	Cagliari	1
46	Gallipoli	0
35	Hellas Verona	1

Second Round
62	Taranto	0
30	Brescia	1
14	Cagliari	2
35	Hellas Verona	1

Third Round
30	Brescia	1*
14	Cagliari	0

First Round
59	Venezia	1
22	Treviso	0
54	Perugia	0(3)
27	Arezzo	0(4)**
70	Melfi	0
11	Udinese	4
43	Avellino	1
38	Albinoleffe	2*

Second Round
59	Venezia	0
27	Arezzo	1*
11	Udinese	2*
38	Albinoleffe	1

Third Round
27	Arezzo	1(6)**
11	Udinese	1(5)

==== Bottom Quarter ====
First Round
58	Martina	0
23	Juventus	3
55	Lucchese	0
26	Cesena	1*
71	Cervia	0
10	Ascoli	6
42	Frosinone	1
39	Napoli	3

Second Round
23	Juventus	2
26	Cesena	1
10	Ascoli	0
39	Napoli	1*

Third Round
23	Juventus	3(4)
39	Napoli	3(5)**

First Round
63	Sassuolo	0
18	Atalanta	3
50	Pavia	0
31	Pescara	4
66	Carpenedolo	1
15	Siena	2*
47	Sanremese	0
34	Triestina	1*

Second Round
18	Atalanta	3
31	Pescara	0
15	Siena	1
34	Triestina	2

Third Round
18	Atalanta	2
34	Triestina	3*

== Knockout stage ==
Round of 16; 8 and 9 November 2006; 28, 29, 30, 6 November and 7 December 2006
3	Milan	4	2	6
30	Brescia	2	1	3
27	Arezzo	2	1	3
6	Livorno	1	1	2
34	Triestina	1	0	1
2	Roma	2	2	4
39	Napoli	1	1	2
7	Parma	0	3	3
12	Sampdoria	1	3	4
5	Palermo	0	2	2
13	Reggina	2	1	3
4	Chievo (a)	2	1	3
8	Empoli	1	1	2
41	Genoa	0	0	0
17	Messina	0	0	0
1	Internazionale	1	4	5

Quarter-finals; 9 January,10 and 11, 2007; 17 and 18 January 2007
3	Milan	2	0	2
27	Arezzo	0	1	1
2	Roma	2	2	4
7	Parma	1	2	3
12	Sampdoria	1	2	3
4	Chievo	0	1	1
8	Empoli	0	0	0
1	Internazionale	2	2	4

Semi-finals; 24 and 25 January 2007; 31 January – 1 February 2007
3	Milan	2	1	3
2	Roma	2	3	5
12	Sampdoria	0	0	0
1	Internazionale	3	0	3

Finals; 9 May 2007; 17 May 2007
2	Roma	6	1	7
1	Internazionale	2	2	4

Top team in each pairing played first leg at home

== Final ==
=== First leg ===
9 May 2007
21:00 CEST

Roma	6–2	Internazionale
Totti 1'; De Rossi 5'; Perrotta 15'; Mancini 30'; Panucci 54', 89'	Report	Crespo 20', 57'

Stadio Olimpico, Rome
Attendance: 39,095
Referee: Massimiliano Saccani

=== Second leg ===
17 May 2007
21:00 CEST

Internazionale	2–1	Roma
Cruz 51'; Crespo 57'	Report	Perrotta 88'

San Siro, Milan
Attendance: 26,606
Referee: Emidio Morganti

Roma won 7–4 on aggregate.

== Top goalscorers ==
Rank	Player	Club	Goals
1	(Italy) Emiliano Bonazzoli	Sampdoria	4
1	(Italy) Francesco Flachi	Atalanta	4
1	(Argentina) Nicolás Burdisso	Internazionale	4
1	(Argentina) Hernán Crespo	Internazionale	4
1	(Italy) Simone Perrotta	Roma	4
1	(Italy) Giuseppe Greco	Genoa	4

* After Extra Time
** After Penalty Shootout
(a) Advances on Away-Goals Rule
