= Julio Cruz (Argentine footballer) =

Argentine footballer (born 1974)

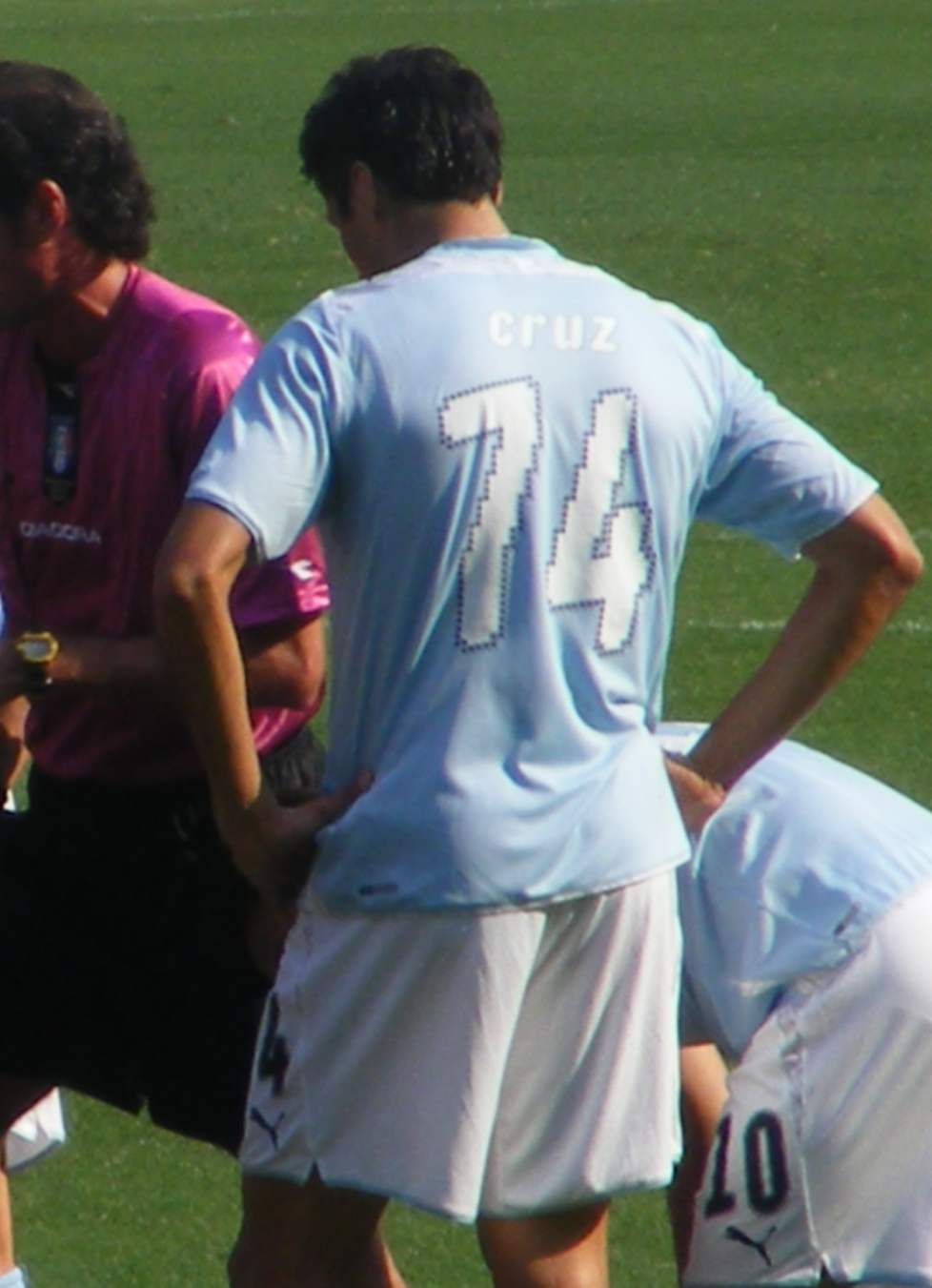
- Julio Cruz with Lazio in 2009

Personal information
- Full name: Julio Ricardo Cruz
- Date of birth: 10 October 1974 (age 52)
- Place of birth: Santiago del Estero, Argentina
- Height: 1.88 m (6 ft 2 in)
- Position: Forward

Youth career
- 1992–1993: Banfield

Senior career*
Years	Team	Apps	(Gls)
1993–1996	Banfield	65	(16)
1996–1997	River Plate	29	(17)
1997–2000	Feyenoord	86	(45)
2000–2003	Bologna	88	(27)
2003–2009	Inter Milan	125	(49)
2009–2010	Lazio	25	(4)
Total		417	(153)

International career
1997–2008	Argentina	22	(3)
- * Club domestic league appearances and goals

Julio Ricardo Cruz (born 10 October 1974) is an Argentine former footballer. He played for clubs in Argentina, the Netherlands and Italy before retiring in 2010. The longest spell of his career was spent with Inter Milan, with whom he won four consecutive Serie A titles, among other honours. A large and physical player, who was known for his ability in the air, he usually played as a striker but he has even played as a winger, as an attacking midfielder, and as a centre-forward. In 2015, he opened his own charity foundation, the Julio Cruz Foundation.

Cruz earned 22 caps for the Argentina national team from his debut in 1997, scoring three goals. He represented Argentina at the 1997 Copa América and the 2006 FIFA World Cup.

== Club career ==
=== Early career ===
A tall, physical striker at 1.90 m (6 ft 3 in), Cruz started his career with Banfield in 1993. In 1996, he moved to River Plate.

=== Feyenoord ===
In 1997, Cruz moved to Europe to join Dutch club Feyenoord. In the 1998–99 season, he helped them to the Eredivisie title, scoring fifteen goals. In 2000, he joined Bologna in Italy.

=== Bologna ===
Under the management of Francesco Guidolin at Bologna, Cruz was mainly used as a lone striker. While he was often derided by fans and the media alike for his lack of goalscoring proficiency, he did prove to be extremely apt at holding the ball up in order to bring the other attackers into the game. In 2001–02, he played an integral part in Bologna's seventh-placed finish in Serie A, and while he only netted ten goals in the league, he earned back the respect of his critics for his intelligent and passionate football.

=== Inter Milan ===
In 2003, Cruz left Bologna to sign for Inter Milan. He was allocated squad number 9 and made his Inter debut on 14 September 2003 in the 1–0 away win against Siena, playing the full 90 minutes. Three days later, he scored his first Inter goal in the 3–0 victory over Arsenal at Highbury on 17 September 2003 in the UEFA Champions League. He continued with his good form, notably scoring a crucial double against Juventus in a 3–1 away win.

With the Nerazzurri, Cruz rarely played regularly in the first team, finding some playing time usually just when the leading strikers were unavailable, and often being used as a substitute. Thus, he scored 12 league goals in his first two seasons with Inter. In a Champions League match against Porto on 1 November 2005, he scored twice in 30 minutes after being sent in to replace striker Adriano, turning a 0–1 into a 2–1 victory.

In the winter of 2005, Cruz was linked with rumours to Roma and other clubs because his contract was set to expire; however, in February 2006, he extended his contract to the summer of 2008. On 8 April 2006, Cruz received his first ever red card during the league match against Ascoli for dissent after sarcastically applauding referee Stefano Farina.

Cruz ended the season as Inter's top scorer with 21 goals, including 15 Serie A goals, and the second goal in the return match for the final of the 2006 Coppa Italia Final that Inter won 3–1 against Roma. He signed a new contract in September 2007.

=== Lazio ===
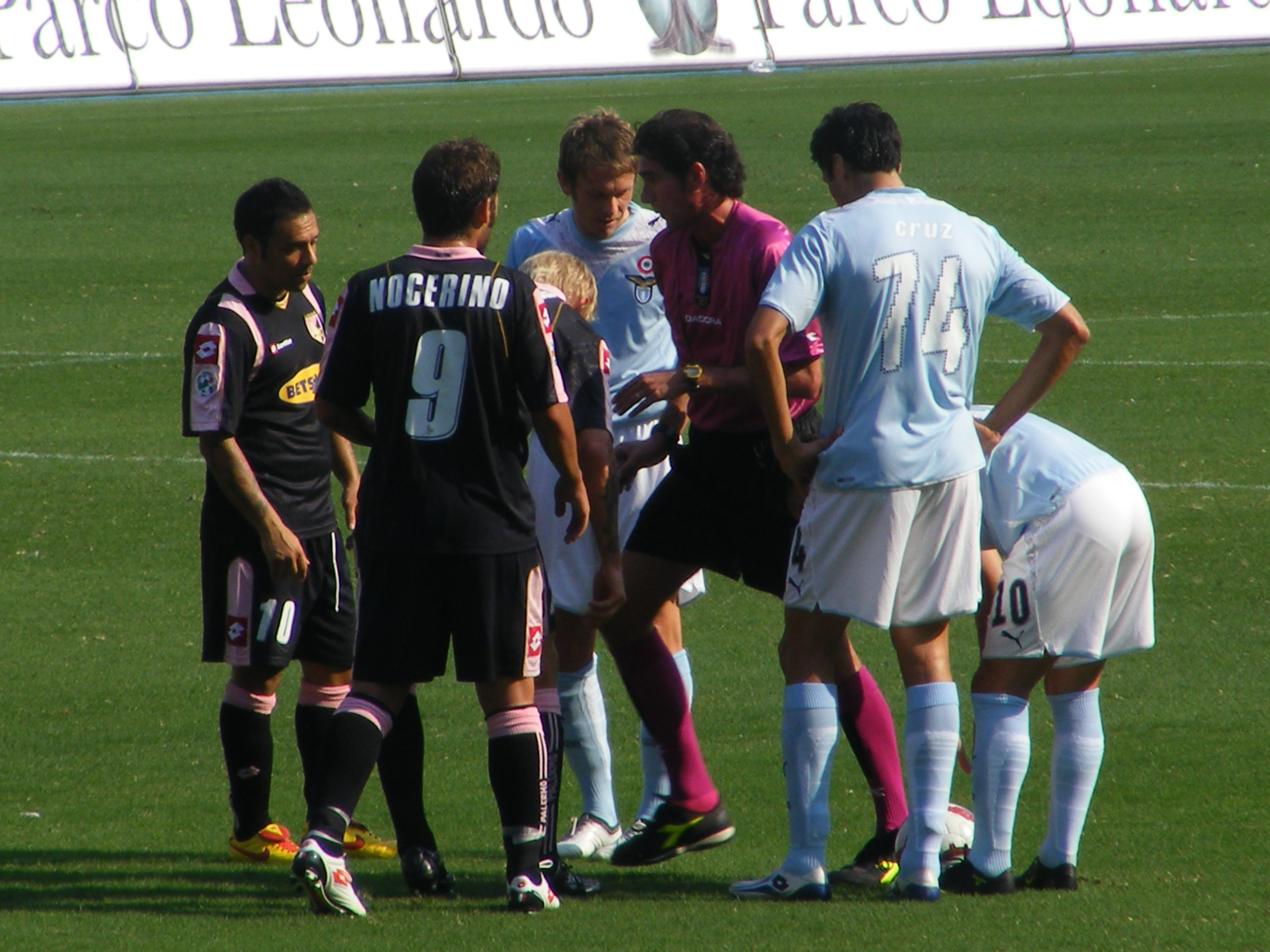
Cruz (#74) during his time as a Lazio player

On 31 July 2009, Cruz left Inter and signed with Lazio on a two-year contract as free agent, but also paid €2.15 million sign-on fees to Van Dijk B.V.; Lazio was later fined by the FIGC due to third parties ownership and unlicensed agent Dennis Anthonius Johannes Maria Sickman.

Cruz made his Lazio debut on 8 August in the 2009 Supercoppa Italiana against Inter, appearing as a 72nd-minute substitute in an eventual 2–1 win at Beijing National Stadium, China, winning his first trophy in Lazio colours. He played his first match as a starter 12 days later, a match which brought his European debut with Lazio as well, playing the full 90 minutes in a 3–0 home win against IF Elfsborg for the first leg of play-off round of 2009–10 UEFA Europa League.

At the end of 2009–10 season, Cruz's contract with Lazio was mutually terminated, as he was suffering from injury. He announced his retirement from football on 7 September 2010, declining offers from Napoli and Grosseto.

== International career ==
Cruz amassed 22 caps and four goals for Argentina. He participated in the 2006 FIFA World Cup, appearing as a late substitute in the matches against the Netherlands and Germany. He scored the opening penalty in the penalty shoot-outs against Germany, but Argentina lost 4–2 on penalties.

== Nickname ==
Cruz's nickname, "El Jardinero" (Spanish for "The Gardener"), was given to him at an early age as he was serving as a groundskeeper while a youngster at local team Banfield in 1993 when he was summoned by Oscar López to fill in for a missing player one day for a first team practice match. Upon noticing his talent he was promoted, and the nickname was born.

Cruz was also nicknamed "Poncharello" by Inter Channel commentator Roberto Scarpini due to his similar appearance with the character from the 1980s TV show CHiPs.

== Career statistics ==
=== Club ===
Appearances and goals by club, season and competition
Club	Season	League			National cup (Note: Includes Copa Argentina, KNVB Cup, Coppa Italia)		Europe		Other		Total	
Club	Season	Division	Apps	Goals	Apps	Goals	Apps	Goals	Apps	Goals	Apps	Goals
Banfield	1993–94	Argentine Primera División	5	0	—		—		—		5	0
Banfield	1994–95	Argentine Primera División	26	6	—		—		—		26	6
Banfield	1995–96	Argentine Primera División	32	10	—		—		—		32	10
Banfield	1996–97	Argentine Primera División	1	0	—		—		—		1	0
Banfield	Total		64	16	0	0	0	0	0	0	64	16
River Plate	1996–97	Argentine Primera División	29	17	—		—		—		29	17
Feyenoord	1997–98	Eredivisie	27	14	1	0	6 (Note: Appearances in UEFA Champions League)	3	—		34	17
Feyenoord	1998–99	Eredivisie	29	15	3	0	2 (Note: Appearances in UEFA Cup)	0	—		34	15
Feyenoord	1999–2000	Eredivisie	30	15	1	0	10	3	1 (Note: Appearance in Johan Cruyff Shield)	0	42	18
Feyenoord	2000–01	Eredivisie	—		—		1	0	—		1	0
Feyenoord	Total		86	44	5	0	19	6	1	0	111	50
Bologna	2000–01	Serie A	27	7	—		1	0	—		28	7
Bologna	2001–02	Serie A	33	10	2	2	—		—		35	12
Bologna	2002–03	Serie A	28	10	1	0	3	1	—		35	11
Bologna	Total		88	27	3	2	7	1	0	0	98	30
Inter Milan	2003–04	Serie A	21	7	4	3	10 (Note: Six appearances and one goal in UEFA Champions League, four appearances in UEFA Cup)	1	—		43	11
Inter Milan	2004–05	Serie A	17	5	6	2	8	2	—		31	9
Inter Milan	2005–06	Serie A	31	15	8	2	7	4	0	0	46	21
Inter Milan	2006–07	Serie A	15	7	4	2	4	3	0	0	23	12
Inter Milan	2007–08	Serie A	28	13	4	4	6	2	1 (Note: Appearance in Supercoppa Italiana)	0	39	19
Inter Milan	2008–09	Serie A	17	2	1	0	5	1	0	0	23	3
Inter Milan	Total		129	49	27	13	40	13	1	0	197	75
Lazio	2009–10	Serie A	25	4	0	0	4 (Note: Appearances in UEFA Europa League)	0	1	0	30	4
Career total			421	157	35	15	70	20	3	0	529	192

=== International ===
Appearances and goals by national team and year

National team	Year	Apps	Goals
Argentina	1997	5	0
Argentina	1998	0	0
Argentina	1999	2	1
Argentina	2000	1	0
Argentina	2001	4	0
Argentina	2002	1	1
Argentina	2003	0	0
Argentina	2004	0	0
Argentina	2005	2	1
Argentina	2006	2	0
Argentina	2007	0	0
Argentina	2008	5	0
Total		22	3

International goals

Scores and results list Argentina's goal tally first.

#	Date	Venue	Opponent	Score	Result	Competition
1.	9 June 1999	Soldier Field, Chicago, United States	Mexico	2–1	2–2	Friendly
2.	13 February 2002	Cardiff City Stadium, Cardiff, Wales	Wales	1–1	1–1	Friendly
3.	16 November 2005	Jassim Bin Hamad Stadium, Doha, Qatar	Qatar	0–2	0–3	Friendly

== Honours ==
River Plate

- Argentine Primera: 1996, 1997

Feyenoord

- Eredivisie: 1998–99
- Johan Cruijff Shield: 1999

Inter Milan

- Serie A: 2005–06, 2006–07, 2007–08, 2008–09
- Coppa Italia: 2004–05, 2005–06
- Supercoppa Italiana: 2005, 2006, 2008

Lazio

- Supercoppa Italiana: 2009

Individual

- Coppa Italia Top-scorer: 2007–08
