= Cristian Chivu =

Romanian football player and manager (born 1980)

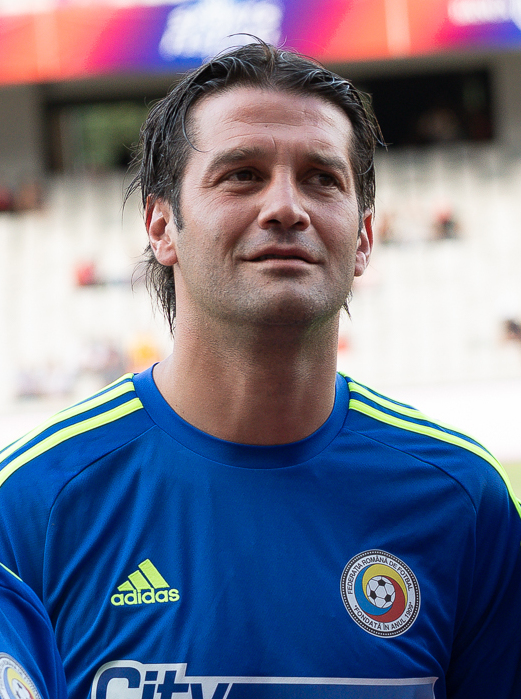
- Chivu in a charity match in 2018

Personal information
- Full name: Cristian Eugen Chivu
- Date of birth: 26 October 1980 (age 46)
- Place of birth: Reșița, Romania
- Height: 1.84 m (6 ft 0 in)
- Positions: Left-back; centre-back

Team information
- Current team: Inter Milan (head coach)

Youth career
- 1991–1997: CSM Reșița

Senior career*
Years	Team	Apps	(Gls)
1997–1998	CSM Reșița	24	(2)
1998–1999	Universitatea Craiova	32	(3)
1999–2003	Ajax	107	(13)
2003–2007	Roma	85	(6)
2007–2014	Inter Milan	115	(3)
Total		363	(27)

International career
1997–1998	Romania U18	12	(1)
1998–2000	Romania U21	14	(0)
1999–2010	Romania	75	(3)

Managerial career
- 2018–2019: Inter Milan U14
- 2019–2020: Inter Milan U17
- 2020–2021: Inter Milan U18
- 2021–2024: Inter Milan U19
- 2025: Parma
- 2025–: Inter Milan
- * Club domestic league appearances and goals

Cristian Eugen Chivu (Romanian pronunciation: [kristiˈan e.uˈdʒen ˈkivu]; born 26 October 1980) is a Romanian professional football coach and former player who is the head coach of Serie A club Inter Milan.

A defender, he began his career with hometown club CSM Reșița before moving to Universitatea Craiova in 1998, leaving Romania to join Dutch club Ajax a season later. His performances as the captain of Ajax inspired an €18 million transfer to Roma in 2003. Chivu won the Coppa Italia in his last of four seasons in Rome before a transfer to Inter Milan, where he spent the rest of his career before retiring in 2014. After recovering from a fractured skull, Chivu wore a distinctive protective headgear from 2010 onwards. His honours at Inter included a treble of the Italian league, domestic cup, and the UEFA Champions League in 2010.

Chivu earned 75 international caps for Romania between 1999 and 2010 and was part of the squads for the UEFA European Championships in 2000 and 2008. After retiring, he became a football pundit for Italian television stations Sky Sport and Fox Sports. He was also a technical observer for UEFA.

He started his coaching career at Inter Milan's youth teams before being appointed as manager of Parma in February 2025. In June 2025, he was appointed as the head coach of Inter Milan, where in his debut season he won a domestic double of the Serie A and the Coppa Italia.

== Club career ==
=== CSM Reșița and Universitatea Craiova ===
Chivu was born on 26 October 1980 in Reșița, Romania and began playing junior-level football at local club CSM Reșița, where he was coached by his father Mircea Chivu. He started playing at senior level by making one league appearance during the 1996–97 Divizia B season, at the end of which CSM earned promotion to the first league. Subsequently, he made his Divizia A debut on 30 August 1997 under coach Ioan Sdrobiș in a 2–0 home win over Universitatea Cluj. When he was 17 years old, his father died on 31 March 1998. Showing remarkable resilience, Chivu returned to the pitch the very next day, scoring from a penalty kick in a 5–1 rout of Ceahlăul Piatra Neamț.

After receiving offers from Steaua București and Universitatea Craiova in the summer of 1998, Chivu chose the latter club, where he was coached by Ilie Balaci. His impressive performances during this spell earned him a move in 1999 to Dutch club Ajax, which paid Universitatea a $2.2 million transfer fee.

=== Ajax ===
Chivu made his Eredivisie debut on 13 October 1999, when coach Jan Wouters sent him in the 85th minute to replace Aron Winter in a 4–0 victory against Vitesse. He scored his first goal in the competition on 7 May 2000 in a 1–0 win over MVV Maastricht. During his years at Ajax, Chivu developed a reputation as a reliable fullback and a free-kick specialist.

In late 2001, Ajax replaced coach Co Adriaanse with Ronald Koeman, who appointed Chivu as captain of the club. Under his captaincy, Ajax won the Double in the 2001–02 season with an exciting young squad. Playing alongside Chivu were future stars such as Rafael van der Vaart, Wesley Sneijder, Johnny Heitinga, Zlatan Ibrahimović, Steven Pienaar, and Maxwell. The team won the title after a 2–0 victory over NEC Nijmegen and Chivu's performance was highly regarded; notably, he finished the match with his shirt ripped, which was years later placed in Ajax's museum. He also played the entire match in the 3–2 win against Utrecht in the KNVB Cup final.

Chivu started the 2002–03 season by playing the full 90 minutes in the 3–1 win over rivals PSV Eindhoven. On 25 August 2002, he scored the winning goal in a 2–1 victory against Vitesse Arnhem by executing a 30-meter free kick with a powerful shot. Furthermore, he helped Ajax reach the Champions League quarter-finals where they met AC Milan. The team was close to semi-final qualification, but in the stoppage time of the second leg, Filippo Inzaghi burst clear to reach a flick-on, lifting the ball over Ajax goalkeeper Bogdan Lobonț; Jon Dahl Tomasson then bundled it over the line to secure a 3–2 victory for the eventual competition winners.

During these years, Chivu also earned some individual accolades, starting with the "2000 Ajax Talent of the Year" award. Subsequently, he was named "Ajax Player of the Year" in 2001 and 2003, won the 2002 Dutch Golden Shoe, was selected for the 2002 UEFA Team of the Year, and was named the 2002 Romanian Footballer of the Year.

=== Roma ===
In 2003, Chivu was transferred from Ajax to Roma for an €18 million fee, at the request of coach Fabio Capello who wanted him to form a partnership in the central defense with Walter Samuel. Chivu made his Serie A debut on 14 September 2003 in a 5–0 victory against Brescia, scoring a goal from a free kick and being considered the second-best player of the match, behind his captain Francesco Totti. One week later, he scored another free kick goal, beating goalkeeper Gianluigi Buffon in a 2–2 draw against Juventus.

Chivu helped the team reach the 2006–07 Champions League quarter-finals, where they suffered an 8–3 aggregate defeat to Manchester United. Later under coach Luciano Spalletti, he played in both legs of the 2007 Coppa Italia final, securing a 7–4 aggregate victory over Inter Milan. Although injuries occasionally restricted his playing time, he remained a regular in Roma's starting lineup throughout his four seasons at the club.

During the 2007 summer transfer window, he was a subject of transfer speculation, with newly crowned La Liga champions Real Madrid reportedly making a formal bid, while Barcelona and Inter Milan were also interested in signing the defender. Chivu left Roma and signed a five-year contract on 27 July 2007 with Serie A rivals Inter, after Inter paid Roma a €16 million transfer fee, €3 million of which was covered by defender Marco Andreolli moving to Roma in a co-ownership deal.

=== Inter Milan ===
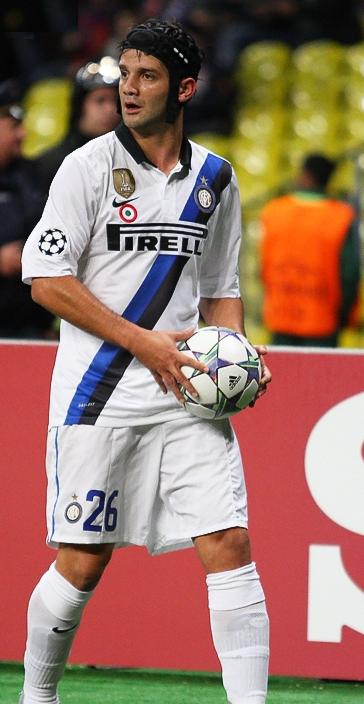
Chivu with Inter Milan in 2011

Throughout his first season with the defending Serie A champions, Chivu played regularly under coach Roberto Mancini to help the team win another title. Following Mancini's departure, he played under José Mourinho, with whom he won the 2008–09 title in their first season together. During the 2008–09 Champions League match at home against Manchester United, Chivu delivered an acclaimed performance in the 0–0 draw, being Inter's second best player behind only goalkeeper Julio César.

Chivu was a regular left-back during the 2009–10 season, as Walter Samuel and Lúcio became the preferred centre-back pairing, with Maicon operating as the right-back. On 6 January, against Chievo, Chivu was stretchered off early in the second half after clashing heads with the opponent's striker Sergio Pellissier. He spent two hours in surgery for a skull fracture and was later cleared of any danger. Although it was initially thought he might be out for the rest of the season, he returned to Serie A on 24 March, playing 78 minutes in a 3–0 success over Livorno. For the remainder of his career, he needed to wear a headguard in matches. A month later, Chivu scored his first goal for Inter in a game against Atalanta with a terrific 30-yard strike to help his side earn a 3–1 victory. The team finished the season by winning a historical Treble. The first trophy won was the Coppa Italia, with Chivu playing the entire match in the 1–0 triumph over his former club Roma in the final. At the end of that match, Chivu made some obscene gestures towards Roma's fans after being insulted by them, for which he was fined by the Italian Football Federation. Afterwards, he helped the team secure the title by entering the field in the 73rd minute to replace Wesley Sneijder during the 1–0 win against Siena in the last round of the season. On 22 May 2010, Chivu was in the starting line-up before being replaced in the 68th minute by Dejan Stanković, as Inter defeated Bayern Munich 2–0 in the Champions League final. The Italian press appreciated Chivu's efficient style of play during the game, while also noticing the difficulties he experienced when facing his direct opponent, Arjen Robben.

Chivu started the 2010–11 season by winning the Supercoppa Italiana, playing the entire match under coach Rafael Benítez in the 3–1 success against Roma. He continued by claiming another trophy, the 2010 Club World Cup, where he played as a starter in the final before being substituted by Stanković in the 54th minute of the 3–0 win over TP Mazembe. On 19 January 2011, he scored against Cesena from six meters out by heading in a cross from Maicon, a goal that turned out to be the game-winner in a 3–2 victory. One week later, he also scored the winning penalty for Inter in their 2010–11 Coppa Italia quarter-final shoot-out win over Napoli. Chivu finished the season by winning the Coppa Italia, playing the full 90 minutes under coach Leonardo Araújo in the 3–1 victory against Palermo in the final.

Following a severe injury in August 2012 and subsequent surgeries, Chivu failed to feature in a single match after May 2013, ultimately terminating his contract with Inter by mutual consent on 31 March 2014. The very same day, he announced his retirement from football on his Facebook page. During his years at Inter, Chivu was named Romanian Footballer of the Year in 2009 and 2010.

== International career ==
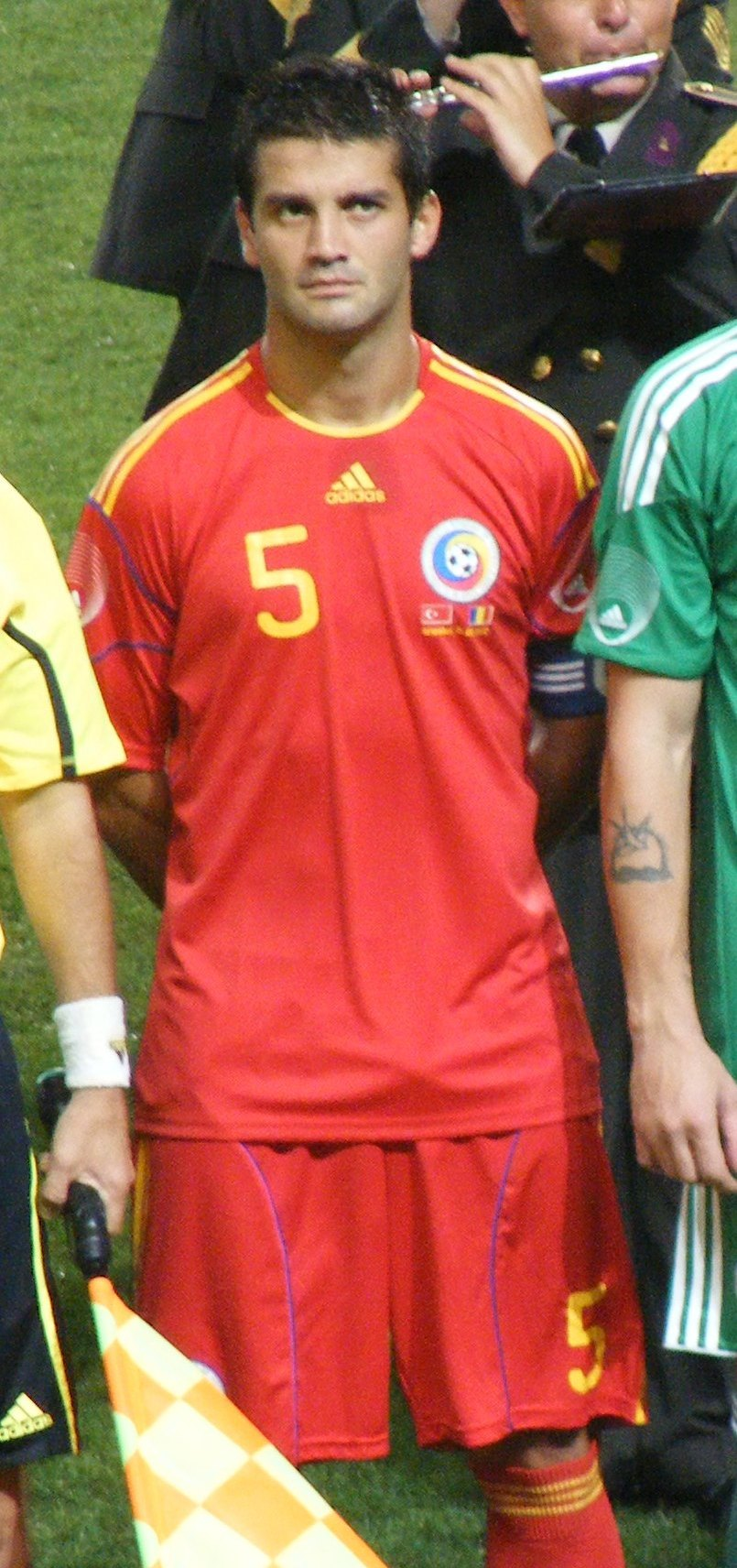
Chivu lining up for Romania in 2010

=== Early years and Euro 2000 ===
From 1997 to 2000, Chivu was consistently featured for Romania's under-18 and under-21 sides.

Chivu played 75 games, captaining 51 of them, and scored three goals for Romania, making his debut on 18 August 1999, when coach Victor Pițurcă sent him in the 71st minute to replace Ștefan Nanu in a 2–2 friendly draw against Cyprus. He was selected by coach Emerich Jenei to be part of the squad that went to Euro 2000. He played in all four games in the final tournament, scoring from the corner of the penalty area in a 3–2 win over England in the group stage. Romania qualified to the quarter-finals, where Chivu played the full 90 minutes in the 2–0 loss to Italy.

He played eight matches in the 2002 World Cup qualifiers, including both legs of the play-off against Slovenia, which ended in a 3–2 aggregate defeat. Afterwards, Chivu played seven matches and scored one goal in a 3–0 victory against Bosnia and Herzegovina during the Euro 2004 qualifiers. He also made six appearances in the 2006 World Cup qualifiers.

=== Euro 2008 and final years ===
Chivu played nine games during the successful Euro 2008 qualifiers. On 25 March 2008, he was decorated by the president of Romania, Traian Băsescu, with the Ordinul "Meritul Sportiv" – (The Medal of "Sportive Merit") Class III for his performance in those qualifiers. He captained Romania under coach Pițurcă for the entirety of all three games in the final tournament, which were two draws against the finalists of the previous World Cup France and Italy, and a loss to the Netherlands, as his side failed to progress from their group.

Chivu made five appearances during the 2010 World Cup qualifiers and two in the Euro 2012 qualifiers. His last appearance for the national team took place on 17 November 2010 in a 1–1 friendly draw against Italy. On 21 May 2011, Chivu announced his retirement from the national team. In 2022, the International Federation of Football History & Statistics (IFFHS) included Chivu in its "Romania's all-time dream team" first XI.

== Managerial career ==
In August 2019, Chivu enrolled in the UEFA Pro Licence courses at Coverciano. In July 2021, he was announced as the new head coach of the Inter Milan Primavera.

=== Parma ===
On 18 February 2025, Chivu was appointed as the new head coach of Serie A club Parma, signing a contract until June 2026. Among his players were compatriots Dennis Man and Valentin Mihăilă. His first match was a 2–0 league victory against Bologna. On the final matchday of the 2024–25 season, Parma secured their survival in the top division following a 3–2 away win over Atalanta.

=== Inter Milan ===
On 6 June 2025, reports indicated that Chivu had signed a two-year deal to become the head coach of his former club Inter Milan, with the official announcement pending the completion of his paperwork with Parma. Three days later, the club officially announced his appointment. His first game in charge ended as a 1–1 draw against Monterrey in the 2025 FIFA Club World Cup. Three days later, Chivu achieved his first win in charge of the club with Inter coming back from a goal down to beat Japanese side Urawa Red Diamonds 2–1. His first game with Inter in Serie A was a 5–0 win against Torino.

Except for a poor Champions League campaign that culminated in a knockout play-off exit to Bodø/Glimt, Chivu's first season with Inter was a success. He led his side to the Serie A title and a Coppa Italia victory—following a 2–0 win over Lazio in the final—securing the club's first double since the treble-winning 2009–10 season.

== Personal life ==
Chivu speaks Italian, Dutch, Spanish, and English, as well as his native Romanian.

His father Mircea was also a footballer and a coach, and the Mircea Chivu Stadium in Reșița is named in his honor. Mircea played as a right back for CSM Reșița and Universitatea Craiova, winning the 1973–74 Divizia A with the latter. Mircea was a coach at CSM Reșița when Cristian started his career. According to Calcio Italia magazine, Chivu has been involved in opening football schools around Romania for the past few years, and he said "I hope that he is proud when he looks down on me" in reference to his father who died in 1998.

He is married to Adelina Elisei, a former Romanian television personality and model. The couple welcomed their first daughter, Natalia, on 12 February 2009, followed by a second daughter, Anastasia, on 4 November 2010, both born in Milan, Italy. The girls were subsequently baptized in the Romanian Orthodox Church in Milan.

== Career statistics ==
=== Club ===
Appearances and goals by club, season and competition
Club	Season	League			National cup (Note: Includes Cupa României, KNVB Cup, Coppa Italia)		Europe		Other		Total	
Club	Season	Division	Apps	Goals	Apps	Goals	Apps	Goals	Apps	Goals	Apps	Goals
CSM Reșița	1996–97	Divizia B	1	0	0	0	–		–		1	0
CSM Reșița	1997–98	Divizia A	23	2	1	0	–		–		24	2
CSM Reșița	Total		24	2	1	0	–		–		25	2
Universitatea Craiova	1998–99	Divizia A	26	3	2	0	–		–		28	3
Universitatea Craiova	1999–00	Divizia A	6	0	0	0	–		–		6	0
Universitatea Craiova	Total		32	3	2	0	–		–		34	3
Ajax	1999–00	Eredivisie	23	1	1	0	4 (Note: Appearances in UEFA Cup)	0	–		28	1
Ajax	2000–01	Eredivisie	26	5	0	0	4	0	–		30	5
Ajax	2001–02	Eredivisie	32	1	4	0	6 (Note: Two appearances in UEFA Cup, four appearances in UEFA Champions League)	0	–		42	1
Ajax	2002–03	Eredivisie	26	6	3	0	12 (Note: Appearances in UEFA Champions League)	0	1 (Note: Appearance in Johan Cruyff Shield)	0	42	6
Ajax	Total		107	13	8	0	26	0	1	0	142	13
Roma	2003–04	Serie A	22	2	2	0	4	0	–		28	2
Roma	2004–05	Serie A	10	2	4	0	1	0	–		15	2
Roma	2005–06	Serie A	27	2	7	0	4	0	–		38	2
Roma	2006–07	Serie A	26	0	7	0	8	0	1 (Note: Appearance in Supercoppa Italiana)	0	42	0
Roma	Total		85	6	20	0	17	0	1	0	123	6
Inter Milan	2007–08	Serie A	26	0	3	0	6	0	1	0	37	0
Inter Milan	2008–09	Serie A	21	0	3	0	2	0	1	0	26	0
Inter Milan	2009–10	Serie A	20	1	3	0	9	0	1	0	33	1
Inter Milan	2010–11	Serie A	24	1	3	0	6	0	4 (Note: One appearance in Supercoppa Italiana, one appearance in UEFA Super Cup, two appearances in FIFA Club World Cup)	0	37	1
Inter Milan	2011–12	Serie A	14	0	1	0	6	0	1	0	22	0
Inter Milan	2012–13	Serie A	10	1	2	0	3 (Note: Appearances in UEFA Europa League)	0	–		15	1
Inter Milan	Total		115	3	15	0	32	0	8	0	168	3
Career total			358	27	44	0	74	0	10	0	486	27

=== International ===
Appearances and goals by national team and year
National team	Year	Apps	Goals
Romania	1999	1	0
Romania	2000	10	1
Romania	2001	8	0
Romania	2002	6	1
Romania	2003	9	0
Romania	2004	2	1
Romania	2005	6	0
Romania	2006	6	0
Romania	2007	8	0
Romania	2008	7	0
Romania	2009	6	0
Romania	2010	6	0
Total		75	3

Scores and results list Romania's goal tally first, score column indicates score after each Chivu goal.

List of international goals scored by Cristian Chivu
No.	Date	Venue	Opponent	Score	Result	Competition
1	20 June 2000	Stade du Pays de Charleroi, Charleroi, Belgium	England	1–0	3–2	UEFA EURO 2000 Group A
2	7 September 2002	Koševo Stadium, Sarajevo, Bosnia and Herzegovina	Bosnia and Herzegovina	1–0	3–0	UEFA Euro 2004 Qual.
3	31 March 2004	Hampden Park, Glasgow, Scotland	Scotland	1–0	2–1	Friendly

== Managerial statistics ==
As of match played 22 November 2026

Managerial record by team and tenure
Team	Nat.	From	To	Record							
Team	Nat.	From	To	G	W	D	L	GF	GA	GD	Win %
Parma	(Italy)	18 February 2025	9 June 2025	13	3	7	3	14	13	+1	23.08
Inter Milan	(Italy)	9 June 2025	present	74	49	11	14	164	79	+85	66.22
Total				87	52	18	17	178	92	+86	59.77

== Honours ==
=== Player ===
CSM Reșița

- Divizia B: 1996–97

Ajax

- Eredivisie: 2001–02
- KNVB Cup: 2001–02
- Johan Cruyff Shield: 2002

Roma

- Coppa Italia: 2006–07

Inter Milan

- Serie A: 2007–08, 2008–09, 2009–10
- Coppa Italia: 2009–10, 2010–11
- Supercoppa Italiana: 2008, 2010
- UEFA Champions League: 2009–10
- FIFA Club World Cup: 2010

Individual

- Ajax Talent of the Year (Marco van Basten Award): 1999–2000
- Dutch Golden Shoe: 2002
- Ajax Player of the Year (Rinus Michels Award): 2000–01, 2002–03
- Gazeta Sporturilor Romanian Footballer of the Year: 2002, 2009, 2010
- UEFA Team of the Year: 2002
- Giacinto Facchetti Awards: 2021

=== Manager ===
Inter Milan

- Serie A: 2025–26
- Coppa Italia: 2025–26

Individual

- Gazeta Sporturilor Romania Coach of the Year: 2025
- Serie A Coach of the Month: December 2025, January 2026
- Serie A Coach of the Season: 2025–26
