= Nicolás Burdisso =

Argentine footballer

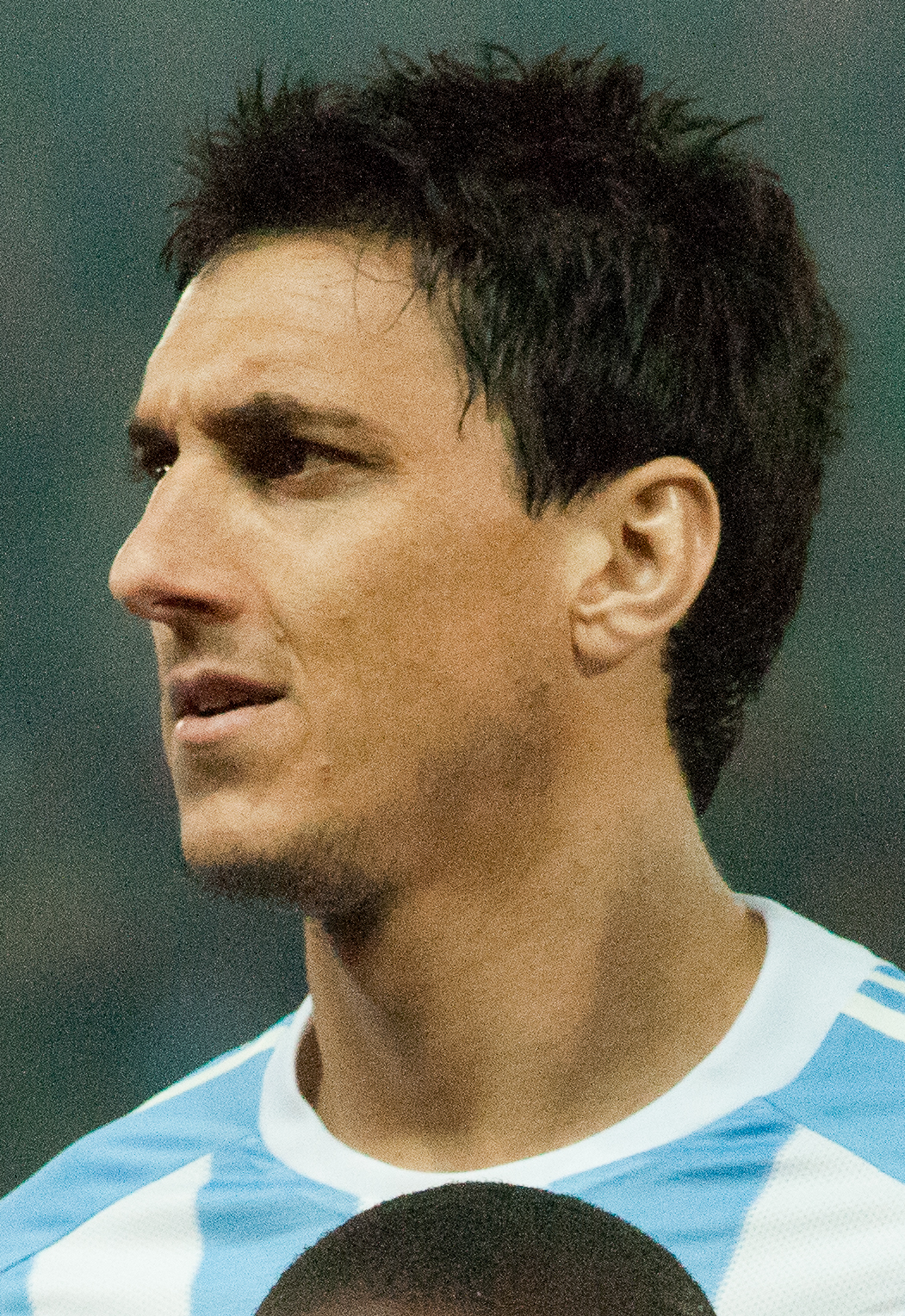
- Burdisso with Argentina in 2011

Personal information
- Full name: Nicolás Andrés Burdisso
- Date of birth: 12 April 1981 (age 45)
- Place of birth: Altos de Chipión, Córdoba, Argentina
- Height: 1.82 m (6 ft 0 in)
- Position: Centre-back

Youth career
- 1997–1999: Boca Juniors

Senior career*
Years	Team	Apps	(Gls)
1999–2004	Boca Juniors	78	(3)
2004–2009	Inter Milan	120	(4)
2009–2014	Roma	115	(6)
2014–2017	Genoa	93	(1)
2017–2018	Torino	24	(0)
Total		419	(17)

International career
2003–2011	Argentina	49	(2)

Managerial career
- 2018–2019: Boca Juniors (sporting director)
- 2021–2024: Fiorentina (technical director)
- 2025–2026: Monza (sporting director)
Medal record
Men's football
Representing Argentina
Olympic Games
Gold medal – first place	2004 Athens
Pre-Olympic Tournament
Winner	2004 Chile
FIFA U-20 World Cup
Winner	2001 Argentina
- * Club domestic league appearances and goals

Nicolás Andrés Burdisso (born 12 April 1981) is an Argentine sporting director and former professional footballer who played as a centre-back.

Burdisso began his career with Boca Juniors. Here, he won Argentine Championships, three Copa Libertadores and two Intercontinental Cups. In 2004, he was sold to Italian club Inter Milan, winning four Serie A titles, a Coppa Italia and Supercoppa Italiana. In 2009, he moved to Roma, and later Genoa and Torino.

A former Argentina international, he made 49 appearances since his debut in 2003. He was selected for two FIFA World Cups and two Copa Americas and was part of the team which won gold at the 2004 Summer Olympics.

Nicolás Burdisso was sporting director of Boca Juniors (2018–2019), technical director of Fiorentina (2021–2024), and sporting director of Monza (2025–2026).

== Club career ==
=== Boca Juniors ===
Burdisso is a product of Argentine club Boca Juniors's youth system. He began his professional career with them in 1999 at age 18. With Boca Juniors, he won two Argentine Championships (2000 Apertura and 2003 Apertura), three Copa Libertadores (2000, 2001, 2003), and two Intercontinental Cups (2000, 2003).

=== Inter Milan ===
In 2004, Burdisso moved to Inter Milan of Serie A, signing a four-year contract. However, he missed almost all of the 2004–05 season after Inter allowed him to return to Argentina to support his daughter Angela, who was fighting leukemia. He returned to action in October 2005 when he played as a second-half substitute in the 5–0 hammering of Livorno. On 31 August 2006, he extended his contract until 2009. On 8 September 2006, four days after Giacinto Facchetti died, Burdisso was given the number 16 jersey for the retirement of Facchetti's beloved number 3 jersey.

Burdisso enjoyed his most prolific campaign during the 2006–07, when he was named the Coppa Italia top scorer with 4 goals jointly with four other players. This also included his first career brace on 29 November 2006 in the 4–0 victory against Messina. He again scored twice on 24 January 2007, in the 3–0 victory against Sampdoria. Inter eventually made their way to the final, where they faced Roma; Burdisso played in the second leg which Inter won 2–1, but they lost the trophy 7–4 on aggregate. In addition to that, he also scored two goals in the championship which ended in conquest.

During the Champions League tie between Valencia and Inter on 5 March 2007, a fracas broke out between players of the two teams. Burdisso suffered a broken nose from a punch in the face from Valencia defender David Navarro. As punishment for his part in the brawl, Burdisso was handed a six-match ban from all European club competitions, with an additional two match suspension. Navarro was sentenced to a seven-month ban from domestic, European and international matches. The match at the Mestalla ended in a goalless draw, which sent Inter out of competition on away goal rule.

Burdisso eventually returned to duty on 12 March 2008 in the second leg of the Champions League match against Liverpool, but was sent off in the 60th minute after receiving his second yellow card of the game. With Inter, he played left and right back and central defender as a key member of the squad in three different competitions.

Burdisso left the club in August 2009 after playing 139 matches and scoring eight goals in all competitions, winning nine trophies in the process.

=== Roma ===
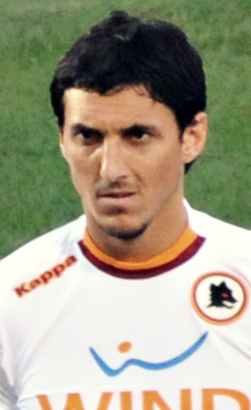
Burdisso with Roma in 2012

On 22 August 2009, Burdisso was signed by Roma on loan, which offered him €3.04 million (gross) salary per year. He played the opening match of the league on 23 August. He scored his first goal for Roma on 20 December 2009, opening the scoring in a 2–0 win over Parma.

Burdisso was then signed by Roma permanently on 28 August 2010 for an €8 million transfer fee. He signed a four-year contract, in which he would earn €3.8 million (pre-tax) his first year, increasing to €4.5 million pre-tax in the next three years.

He scored his fifth goal—first in the 2011–12 Serie A—for Roma against Milan on 29 October. Roma lost that game 3–2. On 15 November 2011, he suffered a serious injury to his left knee which forced him out of action for six months.

In 2007, Burdisso expressed his desire to finish his career at Boca Juniors.

In 2012–13 season under Zdeněk Zeman, Burdisso was relegated to the bench. He played only eight matches in the first part of the season, scoring the opener in a 4–2 win over Milan. Prospects in the starting XI remained dismal after the arrival of new manager Rudi Garcia, typically serving as third-choice centre-back behind starters Mehdi Benatia and Leandro Castán.

=== Genoa ===
On 23 January 2014, Burdisso signed with Genoa. He played for Genoa for four seasons, making 113 appearances.

=== Torino ===
On 31 August 2017, Burdisso was signed by Torino on a free transfer on an annual contract. He concluded the season with 25 appearances for Torino.

He announced his retirement on 10 October 2018.

== International career ==
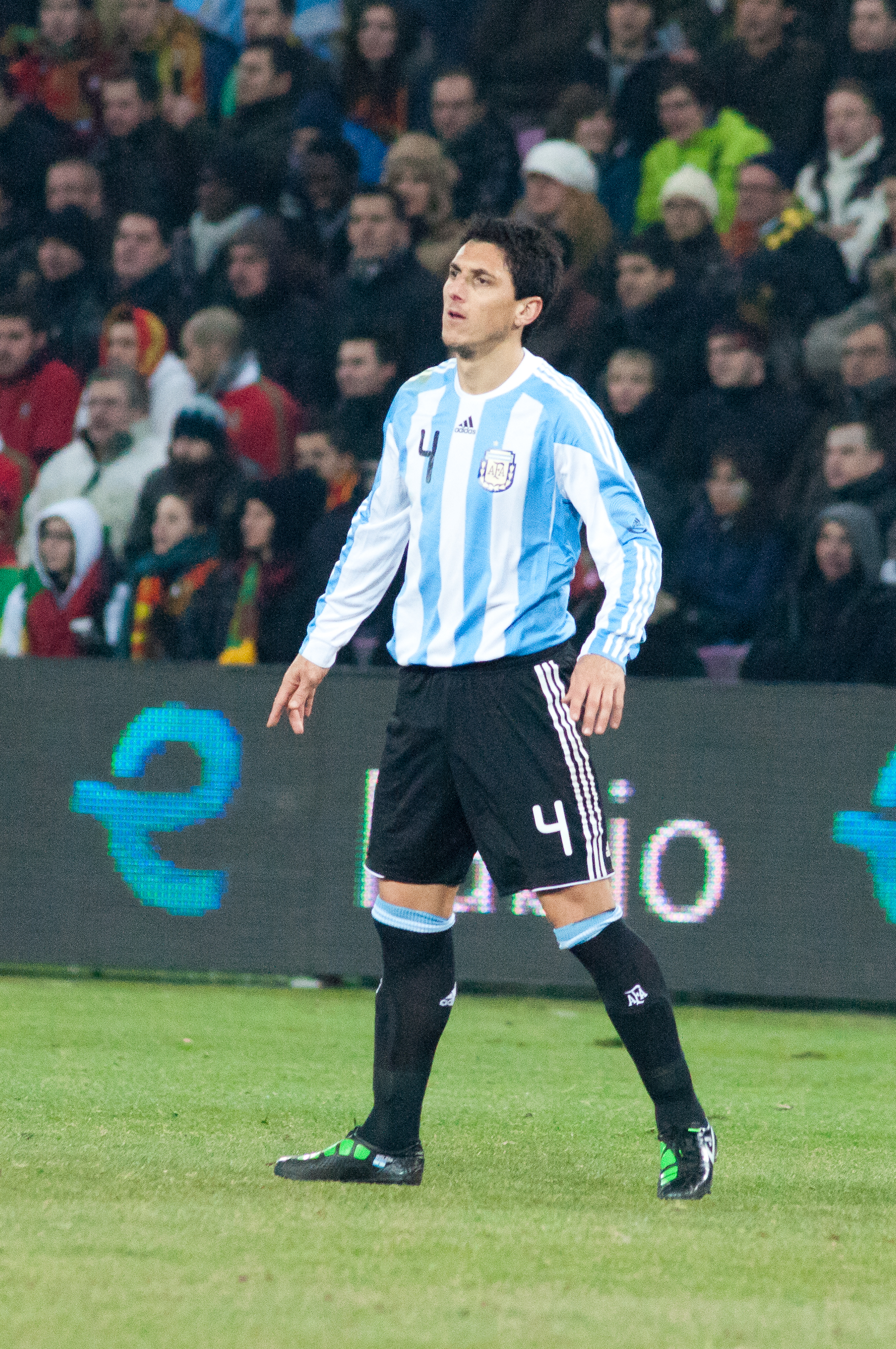
Burdisso during a friendly match against Portugal in February 2011

Burdisso starred in the Argentina under-20 team along with Javier Saviola and Maxi Rodríguez. All three won the 2001 FIFA World Youth Championship together.

On 15 May 2006, Burdisso was named as a squad member for the 2006 FIFA World Cup by his former U-20 coach José Pekerman, going on to play in all three group matches. He also played for Argentina in the Copa América 2007, where the team went on to reach the final.

On 4 June 2008, Burdisso scored his second goal for Argentina during a friendly against Mexico in San Diego, California. Burdisso was selected to the Argentina squad for the 2010 World Cup by manager Diego Maradona and for the Copa América 2011 by manager Sergio Batista.

On 15 November 2011, Burdisso injured his left knee during a World Cup qualifying match against Colombia. During a disputed ball with James Rodríguez, Burdisso partially tore his left knee ligaments, with initial assessments predicting a recovery period of six-to-eight months.

== Personal life ==
Burdisso has a younger brother, Guillermo Burdisso, who was also a footballer and also played for Roma and Argentina. The Burdisso brothers hold Italian passports due to their family origins in Collegno (Turin) and Revello (Cuneo), their grandparents' birthplaces in the Italian region of Piedmont.

== After retirement ==
Retiring in the summer 2018, it was confirmed at the end of December 2018, that Burdisso had been appointed sporting director of his former club, Boca Juniors, signing a deal until December 2020. However, he resigned from the position at the end of 2019.

On 6 July 2021, Burdisso was appointed technical director of Fiorentina. He left the position at the end of 2023–24 season.

On 4 July 2025, Burdisso was appointed sporting director of Serie B team AC Monza, which had been relegated from Serie A at the end of the 2024–25 season. Burdisso renovated the squad, with 24 players leaving and 27 players being brought in. At the end of the 2025–26 season, Monza was promoted again to Serie A after winning the play-offs. On 8 June 2026, news broke that Burdisso would leave Monza and return to Argentina for personal reasons.

== Career statistics ==
=== Club ===
As of 14 February 2018

Appearances and goals by club, season and competition
Club	Season	League			Cup		Continental		Other		Total	
Club	Season	Division	Apps	Goals	Apps	Goals	Apps	Goals	Apps	Goals	Apps	Goals
Boca Juniors	2000	Argentina Primeira División	0	0	—		2	0	—		2	0
Boca Juniors	2001	Argentina Primeira División	1	0	—		9	0	1	0	11	0
Boca Juniors	2002	Argentina Primeira División	23	1	—		7	1	1	0	31	2
Boca Juniors	2003	Argentina Primeira División	24	2	—		14	0	—		38	2
Boca Juniors	2004	Argentina Primeira División	30	0	—		11	2	1	0	42	1
Boca Juniors	Total		78	3	0	0	43	3	3	0	124	6
Inter Milan	2004–05	Serie A	8	0	4	0	3	0	—		15	0
Inter Milan	2005–06	Serie A	16	0	6	0	4	0	—		26	0
Inter Milan	2006–07	Serie A	24	2	7	4	5	0	—		36	6
Inter Milan	2007–08	Serie A	24	1	6	0	2	0	1	0	33	1
Inter Milan	2008–09	Serie A	21	1	3	0	4	0	1	0	29	1
Inter Milan	Total		93	4	30	4	18	0	2	0	139	8
Roma	2009–10	Serie A	33	2	5	0	6	0	—		44	2
Roma	2010–11	Serie A	27	2	4	0	8	0	—		39	2
Roma	2011–12	Serie A	10	1	—		2	0	—		12	1
Roma	2012–13	Serie A	25	1	4	0	—		—		29	1
Roma	2013–14	Serie A	20	0	1	0	—		—		21	0
Roma	Total		115	6	14	0	16	0	0	0	145	6
Genoa	2014–15	Serie A	30	0	1	0	—		—		31	0
Genoa	2015–16	Serie A	28	0	1	0	—		—		29	0
Genoa	2016–17	Serie A	35	0	3	0	—		—		38	0
Genoa	Total		93	0	5	0	0	0	0	0	98	0
Torino	2017–18	Serie A	13	0	1	0	—		—		14	0
Career total			419	17	50	4	77	3	5	0	551	24

=== International ===
Scores and results list Argentina's goal tally first.

#	Date	Venue	Opponent	Score	Result	Competition
1	26 March 2008	Cairo International Stadium, Cairo, Egypt	Egypt	2–0	2–0	Friendly
2	4 June 2008	Qualcomm Stadium, San Diego, United States	Mexico	1–0	4–1	Friendly

== Honours ==
Boca Juniors

- Primera División: 2000 Apertura, 2003 Apertura
- Copa Libertadores: 2000, 2001, 2003
- Intercontinental Cup: 2000, 2003

Inter Milan

- Serie A: 2005–06, 2006–07, 2007–08, 2008–09
- Coppa Italia: 2004–05, 2005–06
- Supercoppa Italiana: 2005, 2006, 2008

Argentina U20

- FIFA U-20 World Cup: 2001

Argentina U23

- Summer Olympics: 2004
- CONMEBOL Pre-Olympic Tournament: 2004

Argentina

- Copa América runner-up: 2007

Individual

- Coppa Italia top-scorer: 2006–07
