= 2004–05 Inter Milan season =

Inter Milan
2004–2005 season
- Owner: Massimo Moratti
- President: Giacinto Facchetti
- Manager: Roberto Mancini
- Stadium: San Siro
- Serie A: 3rd
- Coppa Italia: Winners
- UEFA Champions League: Quarter-finals
- Top goalscorer: League: Adriano (16); All: Adriano (28)
- Highest home attendance: 78,741 vs Juventus (28 November 2004)
- Lowest home attendance: 48,749 vs Atalanta (2 February 2005)
- Average home league attendance: 58,352
Home colours	Away colours	Third colours

The 2004–05 season was Inter Milan's 96th in existence and 89th consecutive season in the top flight of Italian football.

== Season overview ==
The summer of 2004 saw Inter choose a new coach, Roberto Mancini, coming from Lazio. Inter started the season qualifying for the Champions League group phase, but also collected many draws in the league.

Inter, achieved better results in cups, made a comeback (3–2) in a match against Sampdoria, scoring all three goals in the last six minutes. The derby with Milan was lost 1–0, which broke a winning streak, in May 2004. the rivals also knocked Inter out of the Champions League, tournament in which – during the previous two-legs – Mancini's squad had been beaten by reigning champions Porto. Inter achieved a third-place finish in the league. The win of the Coppa Italia final against Roma, 3–0 on aggregate, closed the season.

== Players ==
=== Squad information ===
As of 15 June 2005

Squad no.	Name	Nationality	Position	Date of birth (age)
Goalkeepers
1	Francesco Toldo	(Italy)	GK	2 December 1971 (aged 32)
12	Alberto Fontana	(Italy)	GK	23 January 1967 (aged 37)
15	Fabián Carini	(Uruguay)	GK	26 December 1979 (aged 24)
Defenders
2	Iván Córdoba	(Colombia)	CB / RB	11 August 1976 (aged 27)
3	Nicolás Burdisso	(Argentina)	CB / RB	12 April 1981 (aged 23)
4	Javier Zanetti (Captain)	(Argentina)	RB / RWB / RM / DM	10 August 1973 (aged 30)
11	Siniša Mihajlović	(Serbia and Montenegro)	CB	20 February 1969 (aged 35)
13	Zé Maria	(Brazil)	RB / RWB / RM	25 July 1973 (aged 30)
16	Giuseppe Favalli	(Italy)	LB / RB / CB	8 January 1972 (aged 32)
23	Marco Materazzi	(Italy)	CB	19 August 1973 (aged 30)
24	Carlos Gamarra	(Paraguay)	CB	17 February 1971 (aged 33)
77	Francesco Coco	(Italy)	LB / LWB	8 January 1977 (aged 27)
Midfielders
5	Emre Belözoğlu	(Turkey)	CM / DM / AM	7 September 1980 (aged 23)
6	Cristiano Zanetti	(Italy)	DM / CM	10 April 1977 (aged 27)
7	Andy van der Meyde	(Netherlands)	RW / LW / AM	30 September 1979 (aged 24)
8	Edgar Davids	(Netherlands)	DM / CM	13 March 1973 (aged 31)
14	Juan Sebastián Verón	(Argentina)	CM / DM / AM	9 March 1975 (aged 29)
18	Kily González	(Argentina)	LW / LM	4 August 1974 (aged 29)
19	Esteban Cambiasso	(Argentina)	DM	18 August 1980 (aged 23)
21	Giorgos Karagounis	(Greece)	CM / AM	6 March 1977 (aged 28)
25	Dejan Stanković	(Serbia and Montenegro)	CM / AM / RM / LM	11 September 1978 (aged 25)
Forwards
9	Julio Cruz	(Argentina)	CF	10 October 1974 (aged 29)
10	Adriano	(Brazil)	CF	17 February 1982 (aged 22)
20	Álvaro Recoba	(Uruguay)	SS / CF / LW / AM	17 March 1976 (aged 28)
30	Obafemi Martins	(Nigeria)	CF	28 October 1984 (aged 19)
32	Christian Vieri	(Italy)	CF	12 July 1973 (aged 30)

==== From youth squad ====
Note: Flags indicate national team as defined under FIFA eligibility rules; some limited exceptions apply. Players may hold more than one non-FIFA nationality.

No.	Pos.	Nation	Player
35	GK	ITA	Moreno Impagnatiello
36	GK	ITA	Luca Bonfiglio
37	GK	ITA	Paolo Tornaghi
38	DF	ITA	Paolo Dellafiore
39	DF	ITA	Simone Fautario
40	DF	ITA	Nicolas Giani
41	DF	ITA	Flavio Visconti
42	DF	ITA	Daniel Semenzato
43	MF	NGR	Saidi Oluseyi Adeshokan
44	MF	ITA	Omar Laribi

No.	Pos.	Nation	Player
45	FW	ITA	Francesco Bilardo
46	FW	ITA	Yrius Roberto Carboni
47	MF	ITA	Dino Marino
49	DF	ITA	Marco Andreoli
50	FW	ITA	Matteo Momente
51	MF	ITA	Fabrizio Biava
52	MF	FRA	Tijani Belaid
55	MF	CMR	Daniel Maa Boumsong
87	GK	ITA	Giacomo Bindi

=== Transfers ===
In
Pos.	Name	from	Type
MF	Edgar Davids	Juventus	free
MF	Esteban Cambiasso	Real Madrid	released
MF	Juan Sebastian Veron	Chelsea	loan
DF	Sinisa Mihajlovic	Lazio	free
DF	Giuseppe Favalli	Lazio	free
DF	Zé Maria	Perugia	€1,40 million
DF	Nicolas Burdisso	Boca Juniors	€4,00 million
GK	Fabián Carini	Juventus	€10,00 million
FW	Lampros Choutos	Olympiakos	released
GK	Mathieu Moreau	Spezia	loan ended

Out
Pos.	Name	to	Type
DF	Fabio Cannavaro	Juventus	€10,00 million
FW	Mohamed Kallon	Monaco	€5,00 million
DF	Daniele Adani	Brescia	released
DF	Thomas Helveg	Norwich City	released
MF	Matías Almeyda	Brescia	released
GK	Mathieu Moreau	Ternana	loan
DF	Jérémie Bréchet	Real Sociedad	€4,00 million
DF	Okan Buruk	Beşiktaş	free
MF	Ümit Davala	Werder Bremen	€0,5 million
FW	Nicola Ventola	Crystal Palace	loan
MF	Sabri Lamouchi	Genoa	loan

==== Winter ====
In
Pos.	Name	from	Type
GK	Júlio César	Flamengo	€2,45 million

Out
Pos.	Name	from	Type
GK	Júlio César	Chievo Verona	loan
GK	Alex Cordaz	Spezia	loan
DF	Giovanni Pasquale	Siena	loan
MF	Mario Rebecchi		released
MF	Ianis Zicu	Parma	loan
FW	Riccardo Meggiorini	Spezia	loan
FW	Lampros Choutos	Atalanta	loan

== Competitions ==
=== Overview ===
Competition	First match	Last match	Starting round	Final position	Record							
Competition	First match	Last match	Starting round	Final position	Pld	W	D	L	GF	GA	GD	Win %
Serie A	11 September 2004	29 May 2005	Matchday 1	3rd	38	18	18	2	65	37	+28	47.37
Coppa Italia	21 November 2004	15 June 2005	Round of 16	Winners	8	7	1	0	17	4	+13	87.50
Champions League	11 August 2004	12 April 2005	Third qualifying round	Quarter-finals	12	6	4	2	23	12	+11	50.00
Total					58	31	23	4	105	53	+52	53.45

Last updated: 15 June 2005
Source: Soccerway Calcio

=== Serie A ===
==== League table ====
Pos	Team	Pld	W	D	L	GF	GA	GD	Pts	Qualification or relegation
1	Juventus (Note: Juventus were stripped of the title during the 2005–06 Serie A season, because of the 2006 Italian football scandal.)	38	26	8	4	67	27	+40	86	Qualification to Champions League group stage
2	Milan	38	23	10	5	63	28	+35	79	Qualification to Champions League group stage
3	Internazionale	38	18	18	2	65	37	+28	72	Qualification to Champions League third qualifying round
4	Udinese	38	17	11	10	56	40	+16	62	Qualification to Champions League third qualifying round
5	Sampdoria	38	17	10	11	42	29	+13	61	Qualification to UEFA Cup first round

Source: 2004–05 Serie A, RSSSF.com, Soccerway
Rules for classification: 1) Points; 2) Head-to-head points; 3) Head-to-head goal difference; 4) Goal difference; 5) Goals scored; 6) Draw. (Note: Head-to-head record is used only after all the matches between the teams in question have been played).

==== Results summary ====
Overall								Home						Away					
Pld	W	D	L	GF	GA	GD	Pts	W	D	L	GF	GA	GD	W	D	L	GF	GA	GD
38	18	18	2	65	37	+28	72	11	7	1	34	16	+18	7	11	1	31	21	+10

Last updated: 29 May 2006.
Source: Competitive matches

==== Results by round ====
Round	1	2	3	4	5	6	7	8	9	10	11	12	13	14	15	16	17	18	19	20	21	22	23	24	25	26	27	28	29	30	31	32	33	34	35	36	37	38
Ground	A	H	A	H	A	H	A	A	H	A	H	A	H	H	A	H	A	H	A	H	A	H	A	H	A	H	H	A	H	A	H	A	A	H	A	H	A	H
Result	D	D	W	D	D	W	D	D	D	D	D	D	D	W	D	W	W	W	D	D	W	W	D	W	D	L	W	D	W	W	W	W	L	W	W	W	W	D
Position	8	13	7	6	9	6	5	6	5	6	7	7	7	6	5	4	4	4	4	4	3	3	4	3	3	4	4	3	3	3	3	3	3	3	3	3	3	3

Updated to match(es) played on 29 May 2005. Source: Competitive Matches
A = Away; H = Home; W = Win; D = Draw; L = Loss; = Leader, 2005–06 UEFA Champions League Group stage; = 2005–06 UEFA Champions League Group stage; = 2005–06 UEFA Champions League Preliminary round; = 2005–06 UEFA Cup; = 2005–06 Serie B

==== Matches ====
11 September 2004 1	Chievo	2–2	Inter Milan	Verona
18:00 CEST	Semioli 29'; Pellissier 37'; Marchegiani (yellow card) 90+1'	Report	Favalli (yellow card) 12'; Stanković 16'; Adriano 48'; Mihajlović (yellow card) 60'; Verón (yellow card) 76'	Stadium: Stadio Marc'Antonio Bentegodi; Referee: Gianluca Paparesta

18 September 2004 2	Inter Milan	1–1	Palermo	Milan
20:30 CEST	Adriano 46'	Report	Toni 67'; Biava (red card) 81'	Stadium: San Siro; Referee: Paolo Bertini

22 September 2004 3	Atalanta	2–3	Inter Milan	Bergamo
20:30 CEST	Budan 25'; Rivalta (yellow card) 52'; Pazzini 84'	Report	Stanković 54' van der Meyde (yellow card) 70'; Recoba 79'; Adriano 87'	Stadium: Stadio Atleti Azzurri d'Italia; Referee: Gianluca Paparesta

26 September 2004 4	Inter Milan	2–2	Parma	Milan
15:00 CEST	Córdoba (yellow card) 36'; Martins 72', 82'	Report	Gilardino 17'; F. Simplicio (yellow card) 32'; Marchionni 74'; Morfeo (yellow card) 90'	Stadium: San Siro; Referee: Emidio Morganti

3 October 2004 5	Roma	3–3	Inter Milan	Rome
20:30 CEST	Montella 9' (yellow card) 14'; Totti 57'; De Rossi 74'	Report	Verón (yellow card) 10'; Cambiasso 45+1' (yellow card) 71'; Verón 51'; Recoba 54'	Stadium: Stadio Olimpico; Referee: Paolo Bertini

17 October 2004 6	Inter Milan	3–1	Udinese	Milan
15:00 CEST	Adriano 7', 11' van der Meyde (yellow card) 36'; Vieri 57'; C. Zanetti (yellow card) 82'	Report	Mauri 50'; Pinzi (yellow card) 62'	Stadium: San Siro; Referee: Gianluca Paparesta

24 October 2004 7	Milan	0–0	Inter Milan	Milan
20:30 CEST	Ambrosini (yellow card) 90+2'	Report	Córdoba (yellow card) 25'; Materazzi (yellow card) 56'; Favalli (yellow card) 80'; Cambiasso (yellow card) 87'	Stadium: San Siro; Attendance: 79,775; Referee: Roberto Rosetti

27 October 2004 8	Lecce	2–2	Inter Milan	Lecce
20:30 CEST	Stovini (yellow card) 16'; Bojinov 36', 49'; Silvestri (yellow card) 83'; Giacomazzi (yellow card) 84'	Report	Adriano 4'; Martins 33'; Davids (yellow card) 85'	Stadium: Stadio Via del Mare; Referee: Pasquale Rodomonti

30 October 2004 9	Inter Milan	1–1	Lazio	Milan
20:30 CEST	Adriano 46' (yellow card) 47'; Verón (yellow card) 55'	Report	Dabo (yellow card) 32'; López (yellow card) 67'; Talamonti 84'; Manfredini (yellow card) 90'	Stadium: San Siro; Referee: Matteo Trefoloni

7 November 2004 10	Fiorentina	1–1	Inter Milan	Florence
20:30 CET	Carri (yellow card) 20'; Dainelli 26'; Piangerelli (yellow card) 87'	Report	Materazzi (yellow card) 33'; C. Zanetti (yellow card) 44'; Adriano 81'; Stanković (yellow card) 85' (yellow-red card) 85'; Emre (yellow card) 90'	Stadium: Stadio Artemio Franchi; Referee: Massimo De Santis

10 November 2004 11	Inter Milan	2–2	Bologna	Milan
20:30 CET	Mihajlović 39'; Adriano 71'	Report	Colucci (yellow card) 8'; Petruzzi 49'; Nastase (yellow card) 76'; Bellucci 87'; Gamberini (yellow card) 90+3'	Stadium: San Siro; Referee: Roberto Rosetti

14 November 2004 12	Cagliari	3–3	Inter Milan	Cagliari
15:00 CET	Zola 5' (pen.); Langella 32'; Abeijón (yellow card) 48'; Esposito 60'; Esposito (yellow card) 63'; López (yellow card) 82'	Report	Materazzi (yellow card) 30'; Stanković 34'; Favalli (yellow card) 55'; Martins 75', 88'	Stadium: Stadio Sant'Elia; Referee: Tiziano Pieri

28 November 2004 13	Inter Milan	2–2	Juventus	Milan
20:30 CET	van der Meyde (yellow card) 8'; Vieri 79'; Adriano 85'; Stanković (yellow card) 88'	Report	Blasi (yellow card) 20'; Zebina (yellow card) 40'; Zalayeta 53'; Ibrahimović 66' (pen.)	Stadium: San Siro; Referee: Pasquale Rodomonti

4 December 2004 14	Inter Milan	5–0	Messina	Milan
20:30 CET	Adriano 3', 14', 36'; Eleftheropoulos 56' (o.g.); Vieri 84'	Report	Yanagisawa (yellow card) 13'; Cucciari (yellow card) 54'	Stadium: San Siro; Referee: Pierluigi Collina

12 December 2004 15	Siena	2–2	Inter Milan	Siena
15:00 CET	Taddei (yellow card) 26'; Portanova 41' (yellow card) 48'; Flo (yellow card) 70' (goal) 87'	Report	Cambiasso (yellow card) 25'; Adriano 36' (pen.); Favalli (yellow card) 65'; Córdoba (yellow card) 81'; Vieri 90+3'	Stadium: Stadio Artemio Franchi – Montepaschi Arena; Referee: Stefano Farina

19 December 2004 16	Inter Milan	1–0	Brescia	Milan
15:00 CET	Mihajlović 25'; Córdoba (yellow card) 55'	Report	Di Biagio (yellow card) 12'	Stadium: San Siro; Referee: Pierluigi Collina

6 January 2005 17	Livorno	0–2	Inter Milan	Livorno
15:00 CET	Lucarelli (yellow card) 86'	Report	van der Meyde (yellow card) 27'; Vieri 42', 73' (pen.)	Stadium: Stadio Armando Picchi; Referee: Roberto Rosetti

9 January 2005 18	Inter Milan	3–2	Sampdoria	Milan
15:00 CET	Córdoba (yellow card) 47'; Martins 88'; Vieri 90+1'; Recoba 90+4'; Stanković (yellow card) 90+5'	Report	Tonetto 44'; Rossini (yellow card) 54'; Volpi (yellow card) 68'; Kutuzov 83'	Stadium: San Siro; Referee: Paolo Bertini

15 January 2005 19	Reggina	0–0	Inter Milan	Reggio Calabria
20:30 CET		Report		Stadium: Stadio Oreste Granillo; Referee: Roberto Rosetti

22 January 2005 20	Inter Milan	1–1	Chievo	Milan
20:30 CET	Recoba (yellow card) 55'; Martins 83'	Report	Malagò (yellow card) 31'; Brighi (yellow card) 36'; Semioli (yellow card) 45+1'; Mandelli 73'	Stadium: San Siro; Referee: Gianluca Paparesta

30 January 2005 21	Palermo	0–2	Inter Milan	Palermo
20:30 CET		Report	Vieri 5', 58'	Stadium: Stadio Renzo Barbera; Referee: Matteo Trefoloni

2 February 2005 22	Inter Milan	1–0	Atalanta	Milan
20:30 CET	Martins 33'; Emre (yellow card) 65'	Report	Natali (yellow card) 58'; Migliaccio (yellow card) 66'	Stadium: San Siro; Referee: Salvatore Racalbuto

6 February 2005 23	Parma	2–2	Inter Milan	Parma
15:00 CET	Bonera (yellow card) 29'; F. Simplício 35' (pen.); Gilardino 60'; Bettarini (yellow card) 86'	Report	Stanković (yellow card) 48'; Mihajlović (yellow card) 71'; Córdoba 76'; Vieri 82' (pen.)	Stadium: Stadio Ennio Tardini; Referee: Pierluigi Collina

12 February 2005 24	Inter Milan	2–0	Roma	Milan
20:30 CET	Mihajlović 23', 90+2'; Cambiasso (yellow card) 49'; Córdoba (yellow card) 65'; C. Zanetti (yellow card) 72'	Report	Perrotta (yellow card) 17'; Mexès (yellow card) 81' (yellow-red card) 90+1'; Cassano (yellow card) 85'	Stadium: San Siro; Referee: Matteo Trefoloni

19 February 2005 25	Udinese	1–1	Inter Milan	Udine
20:30 CET	Pizarro (yellow card) 84'; Goitom 90+1'	Report	Verón (yellow card) 31' (goal) 58'	Stadium: Stadio Friuli; Referee: Gianluca Paparesta

27 February 2005 26	Inter Milan	0–1	Milan	Milan
20:30 CET	Verón (yellow card) 53'; Emre (yellow card) 84'	Report	Seedorf (yellow card) 30'; Cafu (yellow card) 68'; Kaká 74'	Stadium: San Siro; Attendance: 78,347; Referee: Massimo De Santis

6 March 2005 27	Inter Milan	2–1	Lecce	Milan
15:00 CET	Córdoba 26'; Adriano 89' (pen.)	Report	Pinardi 21'; Dalla Bona (yellow card) 80'; Ângelo (yellow card) 88'	Stadium: San Siro; Referee: Pasquale Rodomonti

12 March 2005 28	Lazio	1–1	Inter Milan	Rome
15:00 CET	Giannichedda (yellow card) 37' (yellow-red card) 56'; A. Filippini 45'; E. Filippini (yellow card) 60'; Muzzi (yellow card) 90+4'	Report	Adriano (yellow card) 29'; Materazzi (yellow card) 32'; Cruz 70'	Stadium: Stadio Olimpico; Referee: Matteo Trefoloni

20 March 2005 29	Inter Milan	3–2	Fiorentina	Milan
15:00 CET	Cambiasso 27'; Verón 53'; Córdoba 65'	Report	Pazzini 41'; Obodo (yellow card) 45+2'; Viali (yellow card) 77'; Córdoba 87' (o.g.)	Stadium: San Siro; Referee: Paolo Bertini

9 April 2005 30	Bologna	0–1	Inter Milan	Bologna
18:00 CEST	Amoroso (yellow card) 33'; Cipriani (yellow card) 76'; Zagorakis (yellow card) 78'	Report	Cruz 4'; Materazzi (yellow card) 23'; Córdoba (yellow card) 40'; C. Zanetti (yellow card) 45+2'	Stadium: Stadio Renato Dall'Ara; Referee: Stefano Farina

17 April 2005 31	Inter Milan	2–0	Cagliari	Milan
15:00 CEST	Zé Maria 40' (yellow card) 41'; Martins 65'	Report	Bega (yellow card) 18'; Bianchi (yellow card) 37'	Stadium: San Siro; Referee: Massimiliano Saccani

20 April 2005 32	Juventus	0–1	Inter Milan	Turin
20:30 CEST	Ibrahimović (yellow card) 14'; Appiah (yellow card) 29'; Nedvěd (yellow card) 71'	Report	Favalli (yellow card) 21'; Córdoba (yellow card) 22'; Cruz 24'; Cambiasso (yellow card) 44'; C. Zanetti (yellow card) 58'	Stadium: Stadio delle Alpi; Referee: Massimo De Santis

24 April 2005 33	Messina	2–1	Inter Milan	Messina
15:00 CEST	Coppola (yellow card) 48'; Zanchi (yellow card) 54'; Di Napoli 69'; Rafael 90+3'	Report	Emre (yellow card) 38'; Cruz 46'	Stadium: Stadio San Filippo; Referee: Stefano Farina

1 May 2005 34	Inter Milan	2–0	Siena	Milan
15:00 CEST	Cruz 2'; Vieri 31'	Report		Stadium: San Siro; Referee: Paolo Dondarini

8 May 2005 35	Brescia	0–3	Inter Milan	Brescia
15:00 CEST	Sculli (yellow card) 63'	Report	Verón (yellow card) 6'; Martins 55', 67'; Vieri 90+2'	Stadium: Stadio Mario Rigamonti; Referee: Gianluca Paparesta

15 May 2005 36	Inter Milan	1–0	Livorno	Milan
15:00 CEST	Vieri 13'; Mihajlović (yellow card) 20'; Stanković (yellow card) 42'	Report	Pfertzel (yellow card) 19'; Vargas (yellow card) 42'; Vigiani (yellow card) 90+1'	Stadium: San Siro; Referee: Christian Brighi

22 May 2005 37	Sampdoria	0–1	Inter Milan	Genoa
15:00 CEST		Report	Adriano 36'	Stadium: Stadio Luigi Ferraris; Referee: Salvatore Racalbuto

29 May 2005 38	Inter Milan	0–0	Reggina	Milan
15:00 CEST				Stadium: San Siro; Referee: Nicola Ayroldi

=== Coppa Italia ===
==== Round of 16 ====
21 November 2004 Second leg	Inter Milan	3–1	Bologna	Milan
21:00 CET	Vieri 44'; Recoba 70'; Cruz 87'	Report	Bellucci 22'	Stadium: San Siro; Referee: Stefano Cassarà

12 January 2005 First leg	Bologna	1–3 (2–6 agg.)	Inter Milan	Bologna
17:30 CET	Binotto 45'	Report	Martins 56', 81', 85'	Stadium: Stadio Renato Dall'Ara; Referee: Marco Gabriele

==== Quarter-finals ====
27 January 2005 First leg	Atalanta	0–1	Inter Milan	Bergamo
21:00 CET		Report	Martins 81'	Stadium: Stadio Atleti Azzurri d'Italia; Referee: Luca Palanca

16 February 2005 Second leg	Inter Milan	3–0 (4–0 agg.)	Atalanta	Milan
17:30 CET	Recoba 31'; Emre 36'; Cruz 55'	Report		Stadium: San Siro; Referee: Nicola Rizzoli

==== Semi-finals ====
12 May 2005 First leg	Cagliari	1–1	Inter Milan	Cagliari
21:00 CEST	Zola 50'; Bega (yellow card) 53'	Report	Materazzi (yellow card) 44'; Carini (yellow card) 48'; Martins 52' (yellow card) 53'	Stadium: Stadio Sant'Elia; Referee: Paolo Bertini

18 May 2005 Second leg	Inter Milan	3–1 (4–2 agg.)	Cagliari	Milan
17:30 CEST	Vieri 26', 57'; González (yellow card) 40'; Martins 90'	Report	Abeijón (yellow card) 29'; López 64'; Albino (yellow card) 90'	Stadium: San Siro; Referee: Tiziano Pieri

==== Final ====
12 June 2005 First leg	Roma	0–2	Inter Milan	Rome
21:30 CET	Ferrari (yellow card) 29'; Chivu (yellow card) 36'; Perrotta (yellow card) 73'	Report	Adriano 30', 36'	Stadium: Stadio Olimpico; Attendance: 73,437; Referee: Pierluigi Collina

15 June 2005 Second leg	Inter Milan	1–0 (3–0 agg.)	Roma	Milan
20:45 CET	Mihajlović (yellow card) 18' (goal) 52'; Stanković (yellow card) 28'; Córdoba (yellow card) 84'	Report	Panucci (yellow card) 16'; Cassano (yellow card) 31'; Cufré (yellow card) 47' (yellow-red card) 65'; Perrotta (yellow card) 61'	Stadium: San Siro; Attendance: 72,034; Referee: Matteo Trefoloni

=== UEFA Champions League ===
==== Qualifying phase ====
===== Third qualifying round =====
11 August 2004 First leg	Basel (Switzerland)	1–1	(Italy) Inter Milan	Basel, Switzerland
20:45 CET	Cantaluppi (yellow card) 23'; Huggel 25'; Yakin (yellow card) 58'; Smiljanić (yellow card) 87'	Report	Adriano 19'; Stanković (yellow card) 30'	Stadium: St. Jakob-Park; Attendance: 29,500; Referee: Graham Poll (England)

24 August 2004 Second leg	Inter Milan (Italy)	4–1 (5–2 agg.)	(Switzerland) Basel	Milan, Italy
21:00 CEST	Adriano 1', 52'; Stanković 12'; Recoba 59' (yellow card) 60'; Davids (yellow card) 82'	Report	Huggel (yellow card) 32'; Sterjovski 49'; Degen (yellow card) 73'	Stadium: San Siro; Attendance: 40,000; Referee: Anders Frisk (Sweden)

==== Group stage ====
Team	Pld	W	D	L	GF	GA	GD	Pts
(Italy) Inter Milan	6	4	2	0	14	3	+11	14
(Germany) Werder Bremen	6	4	1	1	12	6	+6	13
(Spain) Valencia	6	2	1	3	6	10	−4	7
(Belgium) Anderlecht	6	0	0	6	4	17	−13	0

	AND	INT	VAL	BRM
Anderlecht	–	1–3	1–2	1–2
Inter Milan	3–0	–	0–0	2–0
Valencia	2–0	1–5	–	0–2
Werder Bremen	5–1	1–1	2–1	–

14 September 2004 1	Inter Milan (Italy)	2–0	(Germany) Werder Bremen	Milan, Italy
20:45 CET	Córdoba (yellow card) 31'; Adriano 34' (pen.), 89'; Favalli (yellow card) 45+2'	Report	Ismaël (red card) 5'; Baumann (yellow card) 33'; Micoud (yellow card) 43'	Stadium: San Siro; Attendance: 45,000; Referee: Ľuboš Micheľ (Slovakia)

29 September 2004 2	Anderlecht (Belgium)	1–3	(Italy) Inter Milan	Brussels, Belgium
20:45 CET	Traoré (yellow card) 24'; Hasi (yellow card) 34'; Baseggio 90+4'	Report	Martins 9' (yellow card) 87'; Verón (yellow card) 43'; Adriano 51'; Stanković 55'	Stadium: Constant Vanden Stock Stadium; Referee: Kyros Vassaras (Greece)

20 October 2004 3	Valencia (Spain)	1–5	(Italy) Inter Milan	Valencia, Spain
20:45 CEST	Angulo (yellow card) 5'; Torres (yellow card) 51'; Aimar 73'; Carboni (yellow card) 90'	Report	Verón (yellow card) 6'; Stanković 47'; Vieri 49' van der Meyde 76'; Favalli (yellow card) 80'; Adriano 81'; Cruz 90+1'	Stadium: Mestalla Stadium; Attendance: 40,000; Referee: Urs Meier (Switzerland)

2 November 2004 4	Inter Milan (Italy)	0–0	(Spain) Valencia	Milan, Italy
20:45 CEST	Adriano (red card) 90+1'	Report	Baraja (yellow card) 56'; Caneira (yellow card) 90+2'	Stadium: San Siro; Attendance: 40,000; Referee: Valentin Ivanov (Russia)

24 November 2004 5	Werder Bremen (Germany)	1–1	(Italy) Inter Milan	Bremen, Germany
20:45 CET	Ismaël 49' (pen.); Baumann (yellow card) 71'	Report	Córdoba (yellow card) 43'; Cruz (yellow card) 48'; Cambiasso (yellow card) 51'; Martins 55'	Stadium: Weserstadion; Attendance: 37,000; Referee: Gilles Veissière (France)

7 December 2004 6	Inter Milan (Italy)	3–0	(Belgium) Anderlecht	Milan, Italy
20:45 CET	Cruz 33'; Martins 60', 63'	Report	Hasi (yellow card) 34'	Stadium: San Siro; Attendance: 30,000; Referee: Mike Riley (England)

==== Knockout phase ====
===== Round of 16 =====
23 February 2005 First leg	Porto (Portugal)	1–1	(Italy) Inter Milan	Porto, Portugal
20:45 CET	R. Costa 61'; Costinha (yellow card) 86'	Report	Martins 24'; Favalli (yellow card) 73'; Córdoba (yellow card) 82'; Materazzi (yellow card) 90+2'	Stadium: Estádio do Dragão; Attendance: 65,275; Referee: Graham Poll (England)

15 March 2005 Second leg	Inter Milan (Italy)	3–1 (4–2 agg.)	(Portugal) Porto	Milan, Italy
20:45 CET	C. Zanetti (yellow card) 25'; Adriano 5', 63', 87'	Report	Valente (yellow card) 46'; Jorge Costa 69' (yellow card) 90+2'; Costinha (yellow card) 82'; Maniche (yellow card) 88'	Stadium: San Siro; Attendance: 38,180; Referee: Terje Hauge (Norway)

===== Quarter-finals =====
6 April 2005 First leg	Milan (Italy)	2–0	(Italy) Inter Milan	Milan, Italy
20:45 CEST	Gattuso (yellow card) 34'; Stam 45+1', (yellow card) 65'; Shevchenko 74' (yellow card) 75'	Report	Mihajlović (yellow card) 66'; C. Zanetti (yellow card) 78'	Stadium: San Siro; Attendance: 79,000; Referee: Alain Sars (France)

12 April 2005 Second leg	Inter Milan (Italy)	0–3 (awarded) (0–5 agg.)	(Italy) Milan	Milan, Italy
20:45 CEST	González (yellow card) 4'; Córdoba (yellow card) 11'; Cambiasso (yellow card) 71'	Report	Ambrosini (yellow card) 7'; Shevchenko 30'; Nesta (yellow card) 43'	Stadium: San Siro; Attendance: 79,000; Referee: Markus Merk (Germany)
Note: The match was abandoned after 72 minutes when Milan goalkeeper Dida was struck by a firework from the stands. Milan were awarded a 3–0 win and advanced 5–0 on aggregate.

== Statistics ==
=== Squad statistics ===
	League	Europe	Cup	Total Stats
Games played	38	12	8	58
Games won	18	6	7	31
Games drawn	18	4	1	23
Games lost	2	2	0	4
Goals scored	65	23	17	105
Goals conceded	37	12	4	53
Goal difference	28	11	13	52
Clean sheets	17	3	4	24
Goal by substitute	–	–	–	–
Total shots	–	–	–	–
Shots on target	–	–	–	–
Corners	–	–	–	–
Players used	31	26	28	–
Offsides	–	–	–	–
Fouls suffered	–	–	–	–
Fouls committed	–	–	–	–
Yellow cards	55	21	10	86
Red cards	1	1	–	2

Last updated: 15 June 2005
Source: Soccerway UEFA

=== Appearances and goals ===
As of 15 June 2005

No.	Pos	Nat	Player	Total		Serie A		Coppa Italia		Champions League	
No.	Pos	Nat	Player	Apps	Goals	Apps	Goals	Apps	Goals	Apps	Goals
1	GK	(Italy) ITA	Toldo	41	-28	30	-28	2	0	9	0
4	DF	(Argentina) ARG	Zanetti J	51	0	32+3	0	4+1	0	9+2	0
2	DF	(Colombia) COL	Cordoba	46	3	31+1	3	4	0	10	0
23	DF	(Italy) ITA	Materazzi	40	0	24+2	0	5	0	9	0
16	DF	(Italy) ITA	Favalli	37	0	26	0	2	0	9	0
14	MF	(Argentina) ARG	Veron	39	3	23+1	3	3+2	0	10	0
19	MF	(Argentina) ARG	Cambiasso	44	2	29+1	2	3	0	9+2	0
6	MF	(Italy) ITA	Zanetti C	33	0	18+5	0	2+1	0	5+2	0
25	MF	(Serbia and Montenegro) SCG	Stankovic	47	6	25+6	3	4+2	0	10	3
32	FW	(Italy) ITA	Vieri	36	17	19+8	13	2+1	3	3+3	1
10	FW	(Brazil) BRA	Adriano	42	28	26+4	16	2+1	2	9	10
12	GK	(Italy) ITA	Fontana	9	-6	5	-6	2	0	2	0
11	DF	(Serbia and Montenegro) SCG	Mihajlovic	30	5	18+2	4	6	1	3+1	0
30	FW	(Nigeria) NGR	Martins	46	22	16+15	11	5+1	6	5+4	5
13	DF	(Brazil) BRA	Zé Maria	36	1	14+8	1	6+1	0	6+1	0
7	MF	(Netherlands) NED	van der Meyde	29	1	13+5	0	4+1	0	3+3	1
5	MF	(Turkey) TUR	Emre	27	1	12+7	0	2	1	3+3	0
18	MF	(Argentina) ARG	Kily	21	0	12+2	0	4+1	0	1+1	0
9	FW	(Argentina) ARG	Cruz	32	9	12+6	5	4+2	2	4+4	2
8	MF	(Netherlands) NED	Davids	23	0	7+7	0	3+1	0	4+1	0
3	DF	(Argentina) ARG	Burdisso	15	0	6+2	0	4	0	3	0
21	MF	(Greece) GRE	Karagounis	20	0	5+7	0	4+1	0	1+2	0
26	DF	(Italy) ITA	Pasquale	6	0	4	0	0	0	1+1	0
20	FW	(Uruguay) URU	Recoba	22	6	4+9	3	3+1	2	3+2	1
15	GK	(Uruguay) URU	Carini	9	-3	3+1	-3	4	0	1	0
77	DF	(Italy) ITA	Coco	6	0	2+1	0	3	0	0	0
24	DF	(Paraguay) PAR	Gamarra	6	0	1+2	0	1+2	0	0	0
47	MF	(Italy) ITA	Marino	3	0	1+1	0	0+1	0	0	0
38	DF	(Italy) ITA	Dellafiore	1	0	0	0	0	0	0+1	0
49	DF	(Italy) ITA	Andreolli	1	0	0+1	0	0	0	0	0
52	MF	(France) FRA	Belaïd	1	0	0+1	0	0	0	0	0
48	FW	(Italy) ITA	Meggiorini	1	0	0+1	0	0	0	0	0
51	MF	(Italy) ITA	Biava	1	0	0	0	0+1	0	0	0

- Source: http://calcio-seriea.net/
