= 2004–05 Modena FC season =

Modena
2004–05 season
- Manager: Stefano Pioli
- Stadium: Stadio Alberto Braglia
- Serie B: 8th
- Coppa Italia: Group stage
- Top goalscorer: League: Asamoah Gyan (7); All: Nicola Campedelli; Asamoah Gyan (7 each)
- Average home league attendance: 7,971

The 2004–05 Modena F.C. season was the club's 93rd season in existence and its first season back in the second division of Italian football. In addition to the domestic league, Modena participated in this season's edition of the Coppa Italia. The season covered the period from 1 July 2004 to 30 June 2005.

== Pre-season and friendlies ==
Win Draw Loss

17 August 2004 Friendly	Virtus Pavullese	1–9	Modena	Pavullo Nel Frignano
CEST (UTC+2)				Stadium: Stadio Comunale “G. Minelli”

== Competitions ==
=== Overview ===
Competition	First match	Last match	Starting round	Final position	Record							
Competition	First match	Last match	Starting round	Final position	Pld	W	D	L	GF	GA	GD	Win %
Serie B	13 September 2004	11 June 2005	Matchday 1		42	16	14	12	47	37	+10	38.10
Coppa Italia	14 August 2004	29 August 2004	Group stage	Group stage	3	2	0	1	5	3	+2	66.67
Total					45	18	14	13	52	40	+12	40.00

Source: Competitions

=== Serie B ===
==== League table ====
Pos	Team	Pld	W	D	L	GF	GA	GD	Pts	Promotion or relegation
5	Ascoli (Note: Promoted to Serie A in place of Torino and Perugia.) (P)	42	17	11	14	51	52	−1	62	Promotion to Serie A
6	Hellas Verona	42	15	16	11	60	47	+13	61	
7	Modena (Note: 1 point deducted.)	42	16	14	12	47	37	+10	61	
8	Ternana	42	14	15	13	51	54	−3	57	
9	Piacenza	42	16	8	18	44	46	−2	56	

Source: Almanacco Illustrato del Calcio 2006, Panini Edizioni, Modena, November 2005
Rules for classification: 1) points; 2) head-to-head points; 3) head-to-head goal difference; 4) head-to-head goals scored; 5) goal difference; 6) number of goals scored.
(P) Promoted

==== Results summary ====
Overall								Home						Away					
Pld	W	D	L	GF	GA	GD	Pts	W	D	L	GF	GA	GD	W	D	L	GF	GA	GD
42	16	14	12	47	37	+10	62	11	8	2	28	10	+18	5	6	10	19	27	−8

Last updated: September 2020.

==== Results by round ====
Round	1	2	3	4	5	6	7	8	9	10	11	12	13	14	15	16	17	18	19	20	21	22	23	24	25	26	27	28	29	30	31	32	33	34	35	36	37	38	39	40	41	42
Ground	H	A	H	A	H	A	H	H	A	H	A	H	A	H	A	A	H	A	H	A	H	A	H	A	H	A	H	A	A	H	A	H	A	H	A	H	H	A	H	A	H	A
Result	D	L	W	L	W	L	W	W	L	D	L	W	L	L	W	L	W	D	W	W	L	D	D	L	W	L	D	D	D	W	W	W	D	D	W	D	W	D	D	W	D	L
Position	21	21	19	22	17	19	15	14	15	16	17	15	17	18	16	18	17	17	14	10	13	13	12	16	14	15	15	16	17	15	13	9	9	11	9	9	9	9	9	8	8	8

A = Away; H = Home; W = Win; D = Draw; L = Loss

==== Matches ====
13 September 2004 1	Modena	1–1	Genoa	Modena
CEST (UTC+2)				Stadium: Stadio Ennio Tardini

18 September 2004 2	AlbinoLeffe	2–0	Modena	Bergamo
CEST (UTC+2)

21 September 2004 3	Modena	1–0	Piacenza	Modena
CEST (UTC+2)				Stadium: Stadio Ennio Tardini

25 September 2004 4	Crotone	1–0	Modena	Crotone
CEST (UTC+2)

2 October 2004 5	Modena	4–0	Ternana	Modena
CEST (UTC+2)				Stadium: Stadio Ennio Tardini

6 October 2004 6	Pescara	2–0	Modena	Pescara
CEST (UTC+2)

10 October 2004 7	Modena	1–0	Venezia	Modena
CEST (UTC+2)				Stadium: Stadio Ennio Tardini

16 October 2004 8	Modena	2–1	Perugia	Modena
CEST (UTC+2)				Stadium: Stadio Ennio Tardini

22 October 2004 9	Catanzaro	2–1	Modena	Catanzaro
CEST (UTC+2)

26 October 2004 10	Modena	1–1	Arezzo	Modena
CEST (UTC+2)				Stadium: Stadio Ennio Tardini

30 October 2004 11	Hellas Verona	3–0	Modena	Verona
CEST (UTC+2)

5 November 2004 12	Modena	1–0	Salernitana	Modena
CEST (UTC+2)				Stadium: Stadio Ennio Tardini

14 November 2004 13	Empoli	2–1	Modena	Empoli
CEST (UTC+2)

21 November 2004 14	Modena	0–1	Triestina	Modena
CEST (UTC+2)				Stadium: Stadio Ennio Tardini

28 November 2004 15	Torino	0–3	Modena	Turin
CEST (UTC+2)

5 December 2004 16	Cesena	3–0	Modena	Cesena
CEST (UTC+2)

12 December 2004 17	Modena	2–1	Vicenza	Modena
CEST (UTC+2)				Stadium: Stadio Ennio Tardini

19 December 2004 18	Bari	2–2	Modena	Bari
CEST (UTC+2)

6 January 2005 19	Modena	1–0	Catania	Modena
CEST (UTC+2)				Stadium: Stadio Ennio Tardini

9 January 2005 20	Treviso	1–2	Modena	Treviso
CEST (UTC+2)

16 January 2005 21	Modena	0–1	Ascoli	Modena
CEST (UTC+2)				Stadium: Stadio Ennio Tardini

21 January 2005 22	Genoa	0–0	Modena	Genoa
CEST (UTC+2)

30 January 2005 23	Modena	2–2	AlbinoLeffe	Modena
CEST (UTC+2)				Stadium: Stadio Ennio Tardini

3 February 2005 24	Piacenza	1–0	Modena	Piacenza
CEST (UTC+2)

6 February 2005 25	Modena	2–0	Crotone	Modena
CEST (UTC+2)				Stadium: Stadio Ennio Tardini

13 February 2005 26	Ternana	2–1	Modena	Terni
CEST (UTC+2)

18 February 2005 27	Modena	0–0	Pescara	Modena
CEST (UTC+2)				Stadium: Stadio Ennio Tardini

27 February 2005 28	Venezia	0–0	Modena	Venice
CEST (UTC+2)

6 March 2005 29	Perugia	0–0	Modena	Perugia
CEST (UTC+2)

13 March 2005 30	Modena	2–0	Catanzaro	Modena
CEST (UTC+2)				Stadium: Stadio Ennio Tardini

26 March 2005 31	Arezzo	1–2	Modena	Arezzo
CEST (UTC+2)

10 April 2005 32	Modena	2–0	Hellas Verona	Modena
CEST (UTC+2)				Stadium: Stadio Ennio Tardini

16 April 2005 33	Salernitana	2–2	Modena	Salerno
CEST (UTC+2)

20 April 2005 34	Modena	1–1	Empoli	Modena
CEST (UTC+2)				Stadium: Stadio Ennio Tardini

23 April 2005 35	Triestina	0–2	Modena	Trieste
CEST (UTC+2)

30 April 2005 36	Modena	0–0	Torino	Modena
CEST (UTC+2)				Stadium: Stadio Ennio Tardini

6 May 2005 36	Modena	4–0	Cesena	Modena
CEST (UTC+2)				Stadium: Stadio Ennio Tardini

14 May 2005 38	Vicenza	2–2	Modena	Vicenza
CEST (UTC+2)

21 May 2005 39	Modena	0–0	Bari	Modena
CEST (UTC+2)				Stadium: Stadio Ennio Tardini

28 May 2005 40	Catania	0–1	Modena	Catania
CEST (UTC+2)

5 June 2005 41	Modena	1–1	Treviso	Modena
CEST (UTC+2)				Stadium: Stadio Ennio Tardini

11 June 2005 42	Ascoli	1–0	Modena	Ascoli
CEST (UTC+2)

=== Coppa Italia ===
14 August 2004 1	Modena	0–1	Triestina	Modena
20:30 CEST (UTC+2)				Stadium: Stadio Ennio Tardini

22 August 2004 2	Treviso	1–2	Modena	Treviso
17:00 CEST (UTC+2)				Stadium: Stadio Opitergium

29 August 2004 3	Venezia	1–3	Modena	Venice
18:00 CEST (UTC+2)				Stadium: Stadio Francesco Baracca
