= Fabrizio Biava =

Italian footballer

Personal information
- Date of birth: 25 August 1983 (age 43)
- Place of birth: Melzo, Italy
- Height: 1.82 m (6 ft 0 in)
- Position: Midfielder

Team information
- Current team: Fanfulla

Youth career
- Internazionale

Senior career*
Years	Team	Apps	(Gls)
2003–2008	Internazionale	0	(0)
2004–2005	→ Ternana (loan)	1	(0)
2005	→ Lucchese (loan)	0	(0)
2005–2006	→ Acireale (loan)	13	(0)
2006–2007	→ Pro Patria (loan)	23	(0)
2007–2008	→ Pizzighettone (loan)	25	(3)
2008–2009	Spezia	19	(0)
2009–	Fanfulla	?	(?)
Total		81	(3)
- * Club domestic league appearances and goals

Fabrizio Biava (born 25 August 1983) is an Italian footballer who played as a midfielder.

== Football career ==
Biava started his career at Internazionale. He won the Primavera Champions in 2001–02. In summer 2003, He was promoted to first team along with Alex Cordaz. But he just made a few appearances in friendly matches and played for Primavera U20 team as overage player.

In July 2004, he was on loan to Ternana, (with Mathieu Moreau), where he just made one appearance.

He returned to Inter in January 2005, and made his Inter debut against A.S. Roma in Coppa Italia final.

He was loaned to Lucchese along with Mathieu Moreau in July 2005, but in the last days of transfer windows, he changed to join Acireale along with Alex Cordaz and Devis Nossa.

In July 2006, he moved to Pro Patria, along with Dino Marino, Nicolas Giani.

In August 2007, he left for Pizzighettone on loan.

He left for Serie D side Spezia in 2008-09 season, where he won promotion back to professional football.

In 2009-10 season, he left for Fanfulla.

== Honours ==
Inter

- Coppa Italia: 2004–05
