= Masiero =

Masiero is an Italian surname. Notable people with the surname include:

- Corinne Masiero (born 1964), French actress
- Enea Masiero (1933–2009), Italian footballer and manager
- Guido Masiero (1895–1942), Italian World War I flying ace
- Lauretta Masiero (1927–2010), Italian actress and singer
- Matías Masiero (born 1988), Uruguayan footballer
- Mattia Masiero (born 1986), Italian footballer
