= Benedetto Lorusso =

Italian footballer (born 1990)

Personal information
- Date of birth: 10 October 1990 (age 36)
- Place of birth: Bari, Italy
- Position: Centre-back

Youth career
- Bari

Senior career*
Years	Team	Apps	(Gls)
2009–2012	Bari	0	(0)
2009–2010	→ Noicattaro (loan)	24	(4)
2010–2011	→ Barletta (loan)	9	(0)
2011–2012	→ Valenzana (loan)	15	(0)
2012	→ Giacomense (loan)	5	(0)
Total		53	(4)
- * Club domestic league appearances and goals

Benedetto Lorusso (born 10 October 1990) is an Italian footballer.

== Biography ==
Born in Bari, Apulia, Lorusso started his career at hometown club A.S. Bari. In 2004–05 season he was the member of Giovanissimi Nazionali under-15 team. Lorusso spent 2 seasons in the club's Primavera under-20 team from 2007 to 2009. He also played for Bari first team in a friendly.

Lorusso spent 2009–10 Lega Pro Seconda Divisione with Noicattaro, an Apulia team, where he met namesake Bartolo Lorusso. Benedetto scored 4 goals for Noicattaro as a centre-back (in 4–4–2 or 3–4–1–2 formation). In July 2010 he was loaned to newly promoted Lega Pro Prima Divisione club Barletta. He was the starting defender in the first 3 rounds, but after the arrival of Mattia Masiero (who replaced Lorusso in the second half of round 3), Lorusso lost his starting place. That season he only made two more starts for the Apulia team (5 in total).

Lorusso left for another Italian fourth division club (second division of Lega Pro) Valenzana. He was the starting centre-back of the team before the winter break, made 14 starts out of 19 rounds. However, after the winter break coach Roberto Rossi preferred Luca Della Maggiora and Giovanni Serao as the new starting centre-back (in round 20).

On 31 January 2012 Lorusso was signed by another fourth division club Giacomense.
