= Serao =

Serao is an Italian surname. Notable people with the surname include:

- Matilde Serao (1856–1927), Italian journalist and novelist
- Francesco Serao (1702–1783), Italian physician, physicist, geologist, philosopher and scholar
- Giovanni Serao (born 2 March 1977), Italian retired footballer

== See also ==
- Serra (surname)
