= Bidone d'oro =

Italian ironic football award (2003–2012)

Golden Bin
- Sport: Association football
- Competition: Serie A
- Awarded for: The most disappointing player in Serie A
- Local name: Bidone d'Oro (Italian)
- Country: Italy
- Presented by: Catersport

History
- First award: 2003
- Editions: 10
- Final award: 2012
- First winner: Rivaldo (BRA)
- Most wins: Adriano (BRA); 3 times
- Most recent: Alexandre Pato (BRA)

Bidone d'oro, Italian for "Golden Bin" or "Golden Trashcan", was a tongue-in-cheek prize given to the most disappointing player in Serie A at the end of each calendar year. A play on Ballon d'Or, the winner was chosen through votes by listeners of the Catersport show on Rai Radio 2. The prize was first awarded in 2003 to Rivaldo of Milan, and was discontinued in 2012 when Catersport went off the air. The final Bidone d'Oro was awarded at the end of 2012 to Alexandre Pato following a vote on the discontinued show's Facebook page.

== Winners ==
Year	Rank	Player	National team	Club(s)	Ref(s)
2003	1st	Rivaldo	Brazil	Milan	
2003	2nd	Al-Saadi Gaddafi	Libya	Perugia	
2003	3rd	Carsten Jancker	Germany	Udinese	
2004	1st	Nicola Legrottaglie	Italy	Juventus	
2004	2nd	Christian Vieri	Italy	Inter	
2004	3rd	Alessandro Del Piero	Italy	Juventus	
2005	1st	Christian Vieri	Italy	Inter / Milan	
2005	2nd	Santiago Solari	Argentina	Inter	
2005	3rd	Antonio Cassano	Italy	Roma	
2006	1st	Adriano	Brazil	Inter	
2006	2nd	Alberto Gilardino	Italy	Milan	
2006	3rd	Ricardo Oliveira	Brazil	Milan	
2007	1st	Adriano	Brazil	Inter	
2007	2nd	Dida	Brazil	Milan	
2007	3rd	Ronaldo	Brazil	Milan	
2008	1st	Ricardo Quaresma	Portugal	Inter	
2008	2nd	Christian Vieri	Italy	Atalanta	
2008	3rd	Adriano	Brazil	Inter	
2009	1st	Felipe Melo	Brazil	Fiorentina / Juventus	
2009	2nd	Ricardo Quaresma	Portugal	Inter	
2009	3rd	Tiago Mendes	Portugal	Juventus	
2010	1st	Adriano	Brazil	Roma	
2010	2nd	Amauri	Italy	Juventus	
2010	3rd	Ronaldinho	Brazil	Milan	
2011	1st	Diego Milito	Argentina	Inter	
2011	2nd	Amauri	Italy	Juventus	
2011	3rd	Miloš Krasić	Serbia	Juventus	
2012	1st	Alexandre Pato	Brazil	Milan	
2012	2nd	Nicklas Bendtner	Denmark	Juventus	
2012	3rd	Lúcio	Brazil	Inter / Juventus	

=== Wins by club ===
Club	Total	Year(s)
Inter	4	2006, 2007, 2008, 2011
Milan	3	2003, 2005, 2012
Juventus	2	2004, 2009
Roma	1	2010
