= Adriano (footballer, born 2006) =

Brazilian footballer (born 2006)

Personal information
- Full name: Adriano Carvalho Ribeiro
- Date of birth: 16 June 2006 (age 20)
- Place of birth: Jacarepaguá, Rio de Janeiro, Brazil
- Height: 1.80 m (5 ft 11 in)
- Position: Forward

Team information
- Current team: Gudja United
- Number: 9

Youth career
- Barcelona
- Boavista
- 2021: Grêmio
- 2022–2023: Serrano

Senior career*
Years	Team	Apps	(Gls)
2023–2025	Serrano	4	(0)
2025	Académica de Coimbra B	1	(0)
2025–2026	Operário	0	(0)
2026	Juventus-Lloret	4	(2)
2026–	Gudja United	4	(0)
- * Club domestic league appearances and goals as of 29 October 2026

Adriano Carvalho Ribeiro (born 16 June 2006) is a Brazilian footballer who plays as a forward for Maltese club Gudja United.

== Early life ==
Adriano was born in Jacarepaguá, a neighbourhood in the city of Rio de Janeiro, to former Brazilian international footballer, also named Adriano. He was born while his father was competing with Brazil at the 2006 FIFA World Cup, and so his father first saw him in the form of a photograph sent while he was travelling with the squad.

== Club career ==
Adriano took an interest in football after his father, and began his career with a Barcelona-affiliated academy in Rio de Janeiro. He was playing for Boavista before a move to Grêmio in April 2021. He marked his debut for Grêmio's under-15 side in June 2021 with a goal. Due to the COVID-19 pandemic, Adriano found his opportunities at the club limited, and he was left off Grêmio's sixteen-player squad list for the Nike Cup.

Following his departure from Grêmio in December 2021, he joined the academy of Serrano in early 2022. He made headlines in Brazil for his goal-scoring ability while with Serrano, and was invited to trial with Danish side Esbjerg in October 2022. Despite this, he remained with Serrano, signing a professional contract in April 2023 - a deal running through December 2026.

=== Académica de Coimbra ===
On the 22nd of February, 2025, it was announced that Adriano signed with Portuguese side Académica de Coimbra.

== Career statistics ==
=== Club ===
Appearances and goals by club, season and competition
Club	Season	League			State League		Cup (Note: Includes Copa do Brasil, Taça de Portugal, Copa del Rey and Maltese FA Trophy)		Other		Total	
Club	Season	Division	Apps	Goals	Apps	Goals	Apps	Goals	Apps	Goals	Apps	Goals
Serrano	2023	–			3 (Note: Appearances in the Campeonato Carioca Série B1)	0	0	0	4 (Note: Appearances in the Copa Rio)	0	7	0
Serrano	2024	–			1	0	0	0	0	0	1	0
Serrano	Total		0	0	4	0	0	0	4	0	8	0
Académica de Coimbra B	2024–25	Coimbra Divisão Elite	1	0	–		0	0	0	0	1	0
Operário	2025–26	Liga Meo Azores	0	0	–		1	0	7 (Note: One appearances in the Ponta Delgada Supertaça, six appearances and one goal in the Ponta Delgada Taça Honra)	1	8	1
Juventus-Lloret	2025–26	Primera Catalana	4	2	–		0	0	0	0	4	2
Gudja United	2026–27	Maltese Premier League	4	0	–		0	0	0	0	4	0
Career total			9	2	4	0	1	0	11	1	25	3
