= Adriano (footballer, born February 1982) =

Brazilian footballer

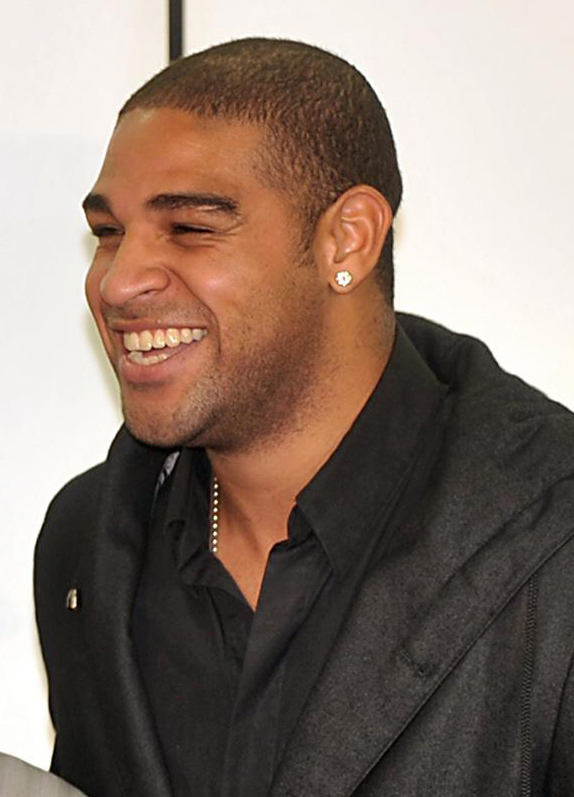
- Adriano in 2009

Personal information
- Full name: Adriano Leite Ribeiro
- Date of birth: 17 February 1982 (age 44)
- Place of birth: Rio de Janeiro, Brazil
- Height: 1.89 m (6 ft 2 in)
- Position: Striker

Youth career
- 1997–1999: Flamengo

Senior career*
Years	Team	Apps	(Gls)
2000–2001	Flamengo	45	(14)
2001–2002	Inter Milan	8	(1)
2002	→ Fiorentina (loan)	15	(6)
2002–2004	Parma	37	(23)
2004–2009	Inter Milan	115	(47)
2008	→ São Paulo (loan)	19	(11)
2009–2010	Flamengo	32	(19)
2010–2011	Roma	5	(0)
2011–2012	Corinthians	7	(2)
2012	Flamengo	0	(0)
2014	Atlético Paranaense	1	(0)
2016	Miami United	0	(0)
Total		296	(133)

International career
1999	Brazil U17	5	(0)
2001–2002	Brazil U20	9	(6)
2000–2010	Brazil	48	(27)
Medal record
Representing Brazil
FIFA Confederations Cup
Winner	2005 Germany
Copa América
Winner	2004 Peru
South American U-20 Championship
Winner	2001 Ecuador
FIFA U-17 World Cup
Winner	1999 New Zealand
- * Club domestic league appearances and goals

Adriano Leite Ribeiro (born 17 February 1982) is a Brazilian former professional footballer. He had four prolific seasons in Italy with Italian clubs Parma and Inter Milan, being considered one of the best strikers in the world during this time and earning the nickname of L'Imperatore ("the Emperor").

Adriano finished within the top 10 of the Ballon d'Or in 2004 and 2005 and was awarded the IFFHS World's Top Goal Scorer of 2005 and was also a three-time winner of Bidone d'Oro award. He was a key figure in Inter's 2005–06 Scudetto win before his career was marked by inconsistency and performance decline which coincided with the death of his father in 2004. He moved back to his native Brazil in 2009 and went on to win a Brasileirão with both Flamengo and Corinthians. He retired in 2016 at the age of 34.

Making his Brazil debut at 18, Adriano was considered the long-term successor to Ronaldo. In the absence of Ronaldo, he led Brazil to the 2004 Copa América, receiving the Golden Boot as the competition's leading scorer with seven goals. He also won the 2005 FIFA Confederations Cup with Brazil, receiving the Golden Boot Award as the competition's leading scorer with five goals. Before the 2006 World Cup he was part of Brazil's much-vaunted "magic quartet" of offensive players alongside Ronaldo, Ronaldinho and Kaká, which ultimately was not successful at the tournament.

== Club career ==
=== Early career ===
Adriano started his career in 1999 on Flamengo's youth squad and earned promotion to the senior squad one year later. He made his team debut on 2 February 2000, a Torneio Rio-São Paulo match against Botafogo. He scored a goal against São Paulo in the same competition 4 days later.

Despite signing a two-year contract with Flamengo in June 2000, he secured a move to Inter Milan for the 2001–02 season. Inter sold another half of Vampeta to PSG (ultimately to Flamengo from PSG for an undisclosed fee) for €9.757 million in exchange for Adriano who was valued €13.189 million. Adriano scored his first goal with the club against Real Madrid in a friendly match as a substitute.

=== Parma ===
Adriano was loaned to Fiorentina for the 2001–02 season, after which a two-year co-ownership deal with Parma was agreed, for €8.8 million, in order to acquire Fabio Cannavaro which also included another half of Matteo Ferrari for €5.7 million He formed an impressive striking duo with Adrian Mutu, scoring 22 goals in 36 appearances. He missed the month of November 2003 due to injury.

=== Return to Inter Milan ===
Adriano returned to the San Siro in January 2004 on a 4 1/2-year contract, for about €23.4 million (Note: Inter did not disclose the exact amount until they submitted an attached "Player identification table" into the 2008–09 statutory financial filing in CCIAA, which showed Adriano's value as €32.2 million and Dejan Stanković's as €6.165 million. According to old accounting standards, the €32.2 million consisted of €8.8 million the value of retained half, plus the bought-back value paid to Parma, and another cost that could be capitalized (if any). Adriano plus Stanković matched the amount in Relazione sulla Gestione (Sports Report) of 2003–04 filing: €38,517,898, and the amount reported by La Repubblica for Adriano only (about €23 million).) and scored a total of 12 goals in the rest of 2003–04 season. Adriano's was in peak form in the 2004-05 season, where he scored 28 goals and was instrumental in Inter's Coppa Italia victory that year, scoring twice in the first leg of the finals to help Inter win their first Coppa Italia title in 23 years. In the Champions League, he scored 4 goals and had 3 assists to help Inter into the round of 16. In the round of 16, he scored a hat trick in the second leg against defending champions Porto. He was voted sixth for the 2004 FIFA World Player of the Year.

In September 2005, Inter rewarded him for his efforts with an improved contract running until 30 June 2010. He finished the 2005-06 campaign with 19 goals as Inter won the double, with his most important moments coming in matches against Treviso, where he scored a hat trick in a 3-0 victory, and AC Milan, where he scored twice, including a game winner, in a 3-2 victory.

Following the signing of the new deal, Adriano's future at Inter suffered due to poor performances, fueled by questions and speculation regarding his work ethic, which was called into question when he was twice caught partying at nightclubs during the 2006–07 campaign. On 18 February 2007, Adriano skipped a team practice due to effects from a lengthy celebration of his birthday the night before, which led to Inter manager Roberto Mancini benching him for the team's Champions League match against Valencia and subsequent Serie A fixture against Catania. He finished the campaign with 6 goals in 30 appearances.

==== Loan to São Paulo ====
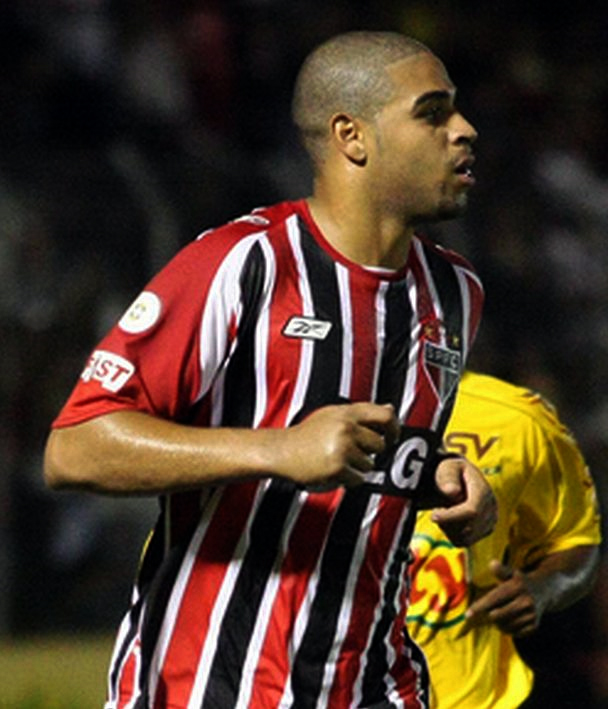
Adriano at São Paulo in March 2008

On 16 November 2007, Inter owner Massimo Moratti sent Adriano on unpaid leave to his native Brazil for the second time in eighteen months, where he attended São Paulo's training center, due to his poor physical condition and a past battle with alcoholism. Though his agent denied Adriano's desire to return to Brazilian club football, Adriano claimed he was willing to leave Inter in the January transfer window in search of regular playing time, with the Italian press stating interest from West Ham United and Manchester City. In December 2007, Manchester City owner Thaksin Shinawatra expressed interest in bringing Adriano to the club during the January transfer window, commenting, "Adriano was a top player, but he lost form when his father died, and he put on weight."

Moratti, however, stated that Adriano would remain with Inter. "I would like him back here in January, as strong and as good as he was." On 10 December, Inter technical director Marco Branca said that Adriano was expected to rejoin the team at the start of the new year. "[The] news has been good. We intend to leave him in peace until the end of the programme and then he will be treated like the other players." Inter finalized a deal on 19 December to loan Adriano to São Paulo for the remainder of the 2007–08 season to allow him to compete in the 2008 Copa Libertadores. São Paulo fans were soon seen standing in long lines to buy his new number 10 jersey at the team's official merchandise retailer after Adriano was introduced and his shirt was unveiled at a team press conference. Adriano celebrated his competitive debut with São Paulo by scoring both goals in their 2–1 victory over Guaratinguetá on the opening day of the 2008 Paulista tournament.

He was sent off after headbutting Santos centre-back Domingos on 10 February 2008, and was suspended for two matches after initially risking a suspension of eighteen months. He was fined by São Paulo on 29 February for arriving 30 minutes late for training, then leaving early and exchanging words with a photographer. According to team sporting director Marco Aurélio Cunha, Adriano "left the training ground because he wanted to. The team does not miss him. If he is not happy in São Paulo, he is free to go." São Paulo sporting director Carlos Augusto de Barros e Silva announced on 17 June that Adriano was returning to Inter ahead of schedule. "We have a balanced squad and it was better for Adriano to go back, given that we won't be able to count on him for the rest of the campaign."

==== 2008–09 season ====
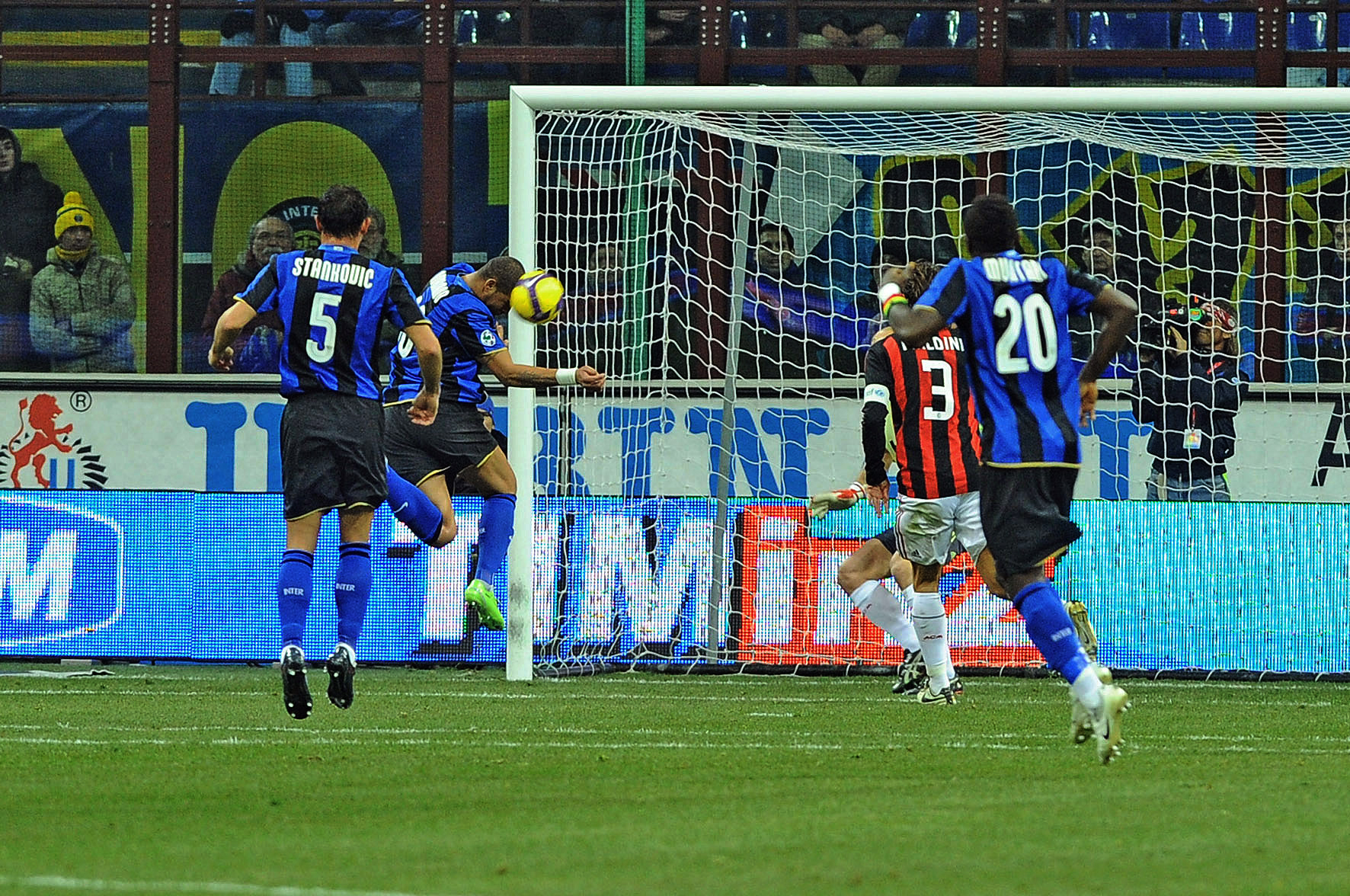
Adriano heading a goal in a Milan derby on 15 February 2009

Adriano was a regular goalscorer in the early stages of the 2008–09 Serie A campaign, reaching a combined total of 100 domestic goals in the Italian Serie A and the Brazilian Série A. On 22 October 2008, Adriano scored the winner in a 1–0 win over Anorthosis Famagusta, and, with this goal, Adriano scored his 18th Champions League goal, and 70th for the club.

In December, Inter Milan allowed him special dispensation to return to Brazil over the winter break earlier than planned. Inter confirmed on 4 April that Adriano had not returned from international duty with Brazil and had signed no contract with the club. On 24 April, Adriano finally rescinded his contract with Inter.

=== Second stint at Flamengo ===
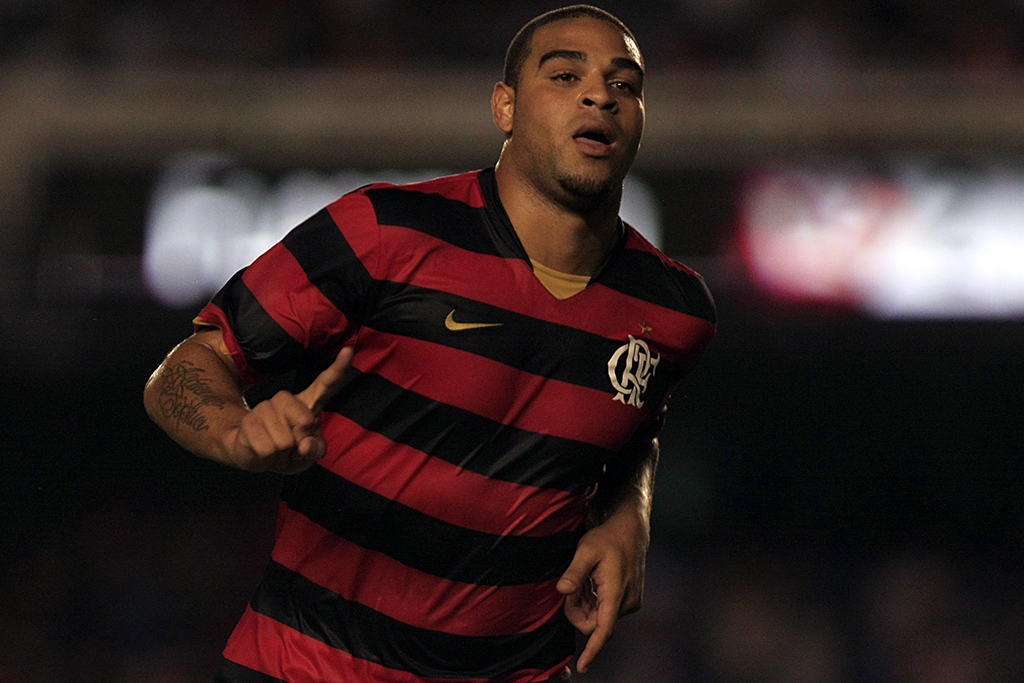
Adriano with Flamengo in 2009

Adriano signed a one-year contract for Brazilian club Flamengo on 6 May 2009, the club with which he started his career. On his debut after returning to Flamengo, played on 31 May 2009, he scored a goal against Atlético Paranaense. On 21 June 2009, he scored his first hat-trick for Flamengo in the 4–0 win over Internacional in the Brazilian Série A; his performances would be instrumental to lead Flamengo to their first Brazilian Serie A title since 1992.

On 31 January 2010, Adriano scored his second hat-trick since his return, this time in a 5–3 comeback win in the Fla-Flu derby against rivals Fluminense in the 2010 Rio de Janeiro State League.

=== Roma ===
On 8 June 2010, Italian Serie A club Roma announced that Adriano had signed a three-year contract with the club, effective on 1 July, earning a gross annual salary of €5 million. He was then presented to the press with the no. 8 shirt. Roma terminated the contract on 8 March 2011, after seven months in the Italian capital.

For all his physical strength, there is something of the lost, sweet-eyed child in Adriano. It became apparent after the premature loss of his father. Adriano has confessed that he was terrified by the thought of becoming the man of the family. And there was something else: his great motivations to play football were to make his father happy and, of course, to make money. Now, with his father gone and his bank balance bulging, what was the point? The sacrifices of the life of an athlete, once part of his routine, were now an unbearable limitation. Why bother with training when he could drink, either to mourn the loss of his dad or to celebrate the fact that he could buy all the drinks that he wanted. The tragedy, of course, is that their talent has a sell-by date. In a decade's time, someone like Adriano will be able to go where he likes, with whoever he likes to wherever he likes. But he will surely feel better about himself if he can legitimately believe that he took his footballing talent as far as it could go.

— Tim Vickery writing for the BBC on Adriano's wasted talent after his departure from Roma.

=== Corinthians ===
On 25 March 2011, he signed a one-year deal with Corinthians. Adriano ruptured his Achilles tendon on 19 April, while he was training after the surgery he spent six months recovering. After recovering, he played his first game for Corinthians on 9 October 2011, when his club beat Atlético Goianiense 3–0. His first goal for Corinthians came on 20 October in the home game versus Atlético Mineiro, and was the winning goal that made the game 2–1 and gave Corinthians a two-point lead in the Championship with only two games remaining. On 12 March 2012, Adriano was released by Corinthians, after his irregular appearances and lack of interest.

=== Third stint at Flamengo ===
On 21 August 2012, Adriano signed a contract with Flamengo. On 7 November 2012, he was released by Flamengo.

=== Atlético Paranaense ===
On 11 February 2014, the Brazilian striker signed a deal with Atlético Paranaense after missing almost 2 years due to injury and off-field issues. On 11 April 2014, he was released by the club after 4 matches.

=== Miami United and retirement ===
On 28 January 2016, Adriano signed a contract with Miami United of the National Premier Soccer League. On 28 May 2016 he left Miami United.

== International career ==
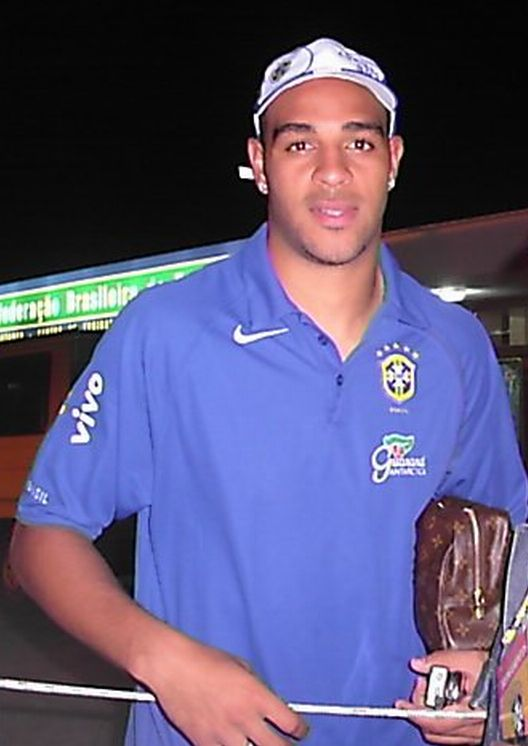
Adriano with the Brazil national football team in 2006. He scored 27 goals in 48 appearances for Brazil.

Adriano made his international debut for Brazil in a World Cup qualifier against Colombia on 15 November 2000 at the age of 18. He was often considered as the long-term successor to Ronaldo. Adriano scored his first international goal on 11 June 2003 in a friendly against Nigeria. He was included in the Brazil team for 2003 FIFA Confederations Cup and led Brazil's attack alongside Ronaldinho in the absence of Ronaldo. He appeared in all three matches and scored two goals as Brazil was eliminated in the group stage. He missed the 2004 CONMEBOL Men Pre-Olympic Tournament due to injury.

The following year, he was included in the Brazil national team for 2004 Copa América. Brazil won the cup and Adriano won the Golden Boot as the competition's leading scorer with seven goals. In the final match against Argentina, Adriano dramatically scored the equalizer in the 93rd minute. The match went on to penalties and Brazil finally won 4–2, with Adriano scoring his penalty. After the match, coach Carlos Alberto Parreira singled out Adriano as a very important factor in winning the title.

Nine days after winning the Copa America, while preparing for Inter's preseason, Adriano's dad passed away due to health complications.

He got a phone call from Brazil: 'Adri, dad is dead'. I saw him in his room, he threw the phone and started screaming. You couldn't imagine that kind of scream. Since that day [Inter chairman Massimo] Moratti and myself watched over him as he was our little brother. He kept playing football, scoring goals, and pointing to the sky dedicating them to his father. After that phone call nothing was the same. [Teammate] Iván Córdoba spent one night with him and said 'Adri, you're a mix of Ronaldo and Zlatan Ibrahimović. Are you aware you could become [the] best player ever?' We did not succeed of pulling him out of depression.

— Inter Milan captain Javier Zanetti on the impact on Adriano of the death of his father in 2004, quoted in Sports Illustrated in August 2017.

In 2005, Adriano once again had an impressive tournament with Brazil, this time in the 2005 FIFA Confederations Cup. Adriano was named Player of the Tournament and received the Golden Boot Award as the competition's leading scorer with five goals. In the final, he steered Brazil to victory, scoring two goals in a 4–1 victory over Argentina.

Adriano was called up for the 2006 FIFA World Cup, forming part of Brazil's highly publicized "magic quartet" of offensive players alongside Ronaldo, Ronaldinho and Kaká. He scored his first goal on 18 June 2006 in a 2–0 win against Australia and his second in a 3–0 victory against Ghana. Despite his two goals, Adriano's World Cup campaign was considered a disappointment, as he managed only five shots all tournament, while Brazil as a whole was unable to find the right mix between defence and attack, ultimately being eliminated in the quarter-finals by France.

After the disappointing World Cup, Adriano's international career declined due to a series of poor club performances and personal problems. Brazilian coach Dunga did not call Adriano up for any matches in 2006 and 2007, with the exception being in a 2–0 friendly loss to Portugal on 6 February 2007, where Adriano came in as a substitute. In 2008, Adriano finally regained his form during his stint at São Paulo and earned a recall to the national team, making his comeback in a 3-2 victory against Canada on 1 June 2008. On 10 October 2008, Adriano scored his first international goal in two years in a World Cup qualifier against Venezuela. He was a regular member of Brazil's squad during World Cup qualification, and was brought for the team's last friendly prior to the 2010 FIFA World Cup against Republic of Ireland. However, Adriano was one of the two players dropped from the final 23-men squad by coach Dunga, along with Carlos Eduardo (who had replaced an injured Elano against Ireland). Grafite, who was the backup for the injured Luís Fabiano in the Ireland game, took Adriano's place instead. Adriano was also left out of the backup player list.

== Style of play ==
"I played with great champions. I played with players that were already...wow. I played with players that I saw were a talented and became...wow, but the one I felt could do it longer, and he didn't do it, was Adriano when I was at Inter. He could shoot from every angle, nobody could tackle him, nobody could take the ball, he was a pure animal."

— Zlatan Ibrahimović

Adriano was a well-rounded, versatile, and modern striker, who combined pace and physicality with nimble footwork and excellent technical skills; due to his dominance, power, and skill, he was nicknamed L'Imperatore ("The Emperor") after the famous Roman Emperor Hadrian, during his time in Italy. Adriano was a left-footed player, who was gifted with excellent ball control, dribbling ability, and creativity. He was also a strong forward, with an eye for goal, and an immensely powerful striker of the ball with his left foot, as well as was an accurate free-kick taker; he was also effective in the air, and had the ability to link-up with his teammates and provide assists. Regarded as a highly promising player in his youth, Adriano's qualities and playing style drew comparisons with that of compatriot Ronaldo, and he was even initially regarded as his potential successor in the media. Despite his natural talent, Adriano's consistency, character, fitness, and work-rate were brought into question after the death of his father; moreover, his struggles with depression and alcoholism, combined with his hedonistic and turbulent lifestyle off the pitch, as well as his personal troubles, injury struggles, and lack of discipline in training, also contributed to his significant weight gain as his career progressed. Due to his inconsistency in later years, he was widely regarded in the media for failing to live up to his initial potential. As such, although he was considered one of the best players in the world at his peak, Adriano is also a record three–time winner of the Bidone d'Oro Award, a prize is given to the worst Serie A player during a particular season, which he won in 2006 and 2007 with Inter, and in 2010 with Roma.

== Personal life ==
In November 2014, a judge in Rio de Janeiro cleared Adriano of charges of drug trafficking which had first been alleged in 2010, due to a lack of sufficient evidence.

His son, also named Adriano, is also a professional footballer.

On 31 October 2024, an online video that had gone viral showed Adriano heavily intoxicated and stumbling on the streets of one of the favelas in Rio de Janeiro. An accompanying article also mentioned his marital troubles (divorce after just 24 days of marriage). He admitted becoming an alcoholic after the death of his father.

== Career statistics ==
=== Club ===
Appearances and goals by club, season and competition
Club	Season	League			National cup (Note: Includes Copa do Brasil, Coppa Italia)		Continental		Other		Total	
Club	Season	Division	Apps	Goals	Apps	Goals	Apps	Goals	Apps	Goals	Apps	Goals
Flamengo	2000	Série A	19	7	–		8	1	13	3	40	11
Flamengo	2001	Série A	5	3	4	1	2	0	8	1	19	5
Flamengo	Total		24	10	4	1	10	1	21	4	59	16
Inter Milan	2001–02	Serie A	8	1	1	0	5 (Note: Appearances in UEFA Cup)	0	–		14	1
Fiorentina (loan)	2001–02	Serie A	15	6	–		–		–		15	6
Parma	2002–03	Serie A	28	15	1	0	2	2	–		31	17
Parma	2003–04	Serie A	9	8	2	0	2	1	–		13	9
Parma	Total		37	23	3	0	4	3	–		44	26
Inter Milan	2003–04	Serie A	16	9	2	3	–		–		18	12
Inter Milan	2004–05	Serie A	30	16	3	2	9 (Note: Appearances in UEFA Champions League)	10	–		42	28
Inter Milan	2005–06	Serie A	30	13	5	0	11	6	1 (Note: Appearance in Supercoppa Italiana)	0	47	19
Inter Milan	2006–07	Serie A	23	5	3	1	3	0	1	0	30	6
Inter Milan	2007–08	Serie A	4	1	–		–		–		4	1
Inter Milan	2008–09	Serie A	12	3	3	2	7	2	–		22	7
Inter Milan	Total		115	47	16	8	30	18	2	0	163	73
São Paulo (loan)	2008	Série A	–		–		10	6	19	11	29	17
Flamengo	2009	Série A	30	19	–		–		–		30	19
Flamengo	2010	Série A	2	0	–		7	4	12	11	21	15
Flamengo	Total		32	19	–		7	4	12	11	51	34
Roma	2010–11	Serie A	5	0	1	0	1	0	1	0	8	0
Corinthians	2011	Série A	4	1	–		–		–		4	1
Corinthians	2012	Série A	–		–		–		3	1	3	1
Corinthians	Total		4	0	–		–		3	1	7	2
Atlético Paranaense	2014	Série A	1	0	–		3	1	–		4	1
Miami United	2016	NPSL	0	0	–		0	0	1	1	1	1
Career total			241	107	25	9	70	33	59	28	405	177

=== International ===
Appearances and goals by national team and year
National team	Year	Apps	Goals
Brazil	2000	1	0
Brazil	2001	0	0
Brazil	2002	0	0
Brazil	2003	6	3
Brazil	2004	11	9
Brazil	2005	12	10
Brazil	2006	6	3
Brazil	2007	1	0
Brazil	2008	6	2
Brazil	2009	4	0
Brazil	2010	1	0
Total		48	27

Scores and results list Brazil's goal tally first, score column indicates score after each Adriano goal.

List of international goals scored by Adriano
No.	Date	Venue	Opponent	Score	Result	Competition
1	11 June 2003	Abuja, Nigeria	Nigeria	3–0	3–0	Friendly
2	21 June 2003	Lyon, France	United States	1–0	1–0	2003 FIFA Confederations Cup
3	23 June 2003	Saint-Étienne, France	Turkey	1–0	2–2	2003 FIFA Confederations Cup
4	11 July 2004	Arequipa, Peru	Costa Rica	1–0	4–1	2004 Copa América
5	11 July 2004	Arequipa, Peru	Costa Rica	3–0	4–1	2004 Copa América
6	11 July 2004	Arequipa, Peru	Costa Rica	4–0	4–1	2004 Copa América
7	18 July 2004	Piura, Peru	Mexico	2–0	4–0	2004 Copa América
8	18 July 2004	Piura, Peru	Mexico	3–0	4–0	2004 Copa América
9	21 July 2004	Lima, Peru	Uruguay	1–1	1–1	2004 Copa América
10	25 July 2004	Lima, Peru	Argentina	2–2	2–2	2004 Copa América
11	5 September 2004	São Paulo, Brazil	Bolivia	3–0	3–1	2006 FIFA World Cup qualification
12	9 October 2004	Maracaibo, Venezuela	Venezuela	5–0	5–2	2006 FIFA World Cup qualification
13	16 June 2005	Leipzig, Germany	Greece	1–0	3–0	2005 FIFA Confederations Cup
14	25 June 2005	Nuremberg, Germany	Germany	1–0	3–2	2005 FIFA Confederations Cup
15	25 June 2005	Nuremberg, Germany	Germany	3–2	3–2	2005 FIFA Confederations Cup
16	29 June 2005	Frankfurt, Germany	Argentina	1–0	4–1	2005 FIFA Confederations Cup
17	29 June 2005	Frankfurt, Germany	Argentina	4–0	4–1	2005 FIFA Confederations Cup
18	4 September 2005	Brasília, Brazil	Chile	3–0	5–0	2006 FIFA World Cup qualification
19	4 September 2005	Brasília, Brazil	Chile	4–0	5–0	2006 FIFA World Cup qualification
20	4 September 2005	Brasília, Brazil	Chile	5–0	5–0	2006 FIFA World Cup qualification
21	12 October 2005	Belém, Brazil	Venezuela	1–0	3–0	2006 FIFA World Cup qualification
22	21 November 2005	Abu Dhabi, United Arab Emirates	United Arab Emirates	2–0	8–0	Friendly
23	4 June 2006	Geneva, Switzerland	New Zealand	2–0	4–0	Friendly
24	18 June 2006	Munich, Germany	Australia	1–0	2–0	2006 FIFA World Cup
25	27 June 2006	Dortmund, Germany	Ghana	2–0	3–0	2006 FIFA World Cup
26	10 October 2008	San Cristóbal, Venezuela	Venezuela	3–0	4–0	2010 FIFA World Cup qualification
27	19 November 2008	Brasília, Brazil	Portugal	6–2	6–2	Friendly

== Honours ==
Flamengo

- Série A: 2009
- Campeonato Carioca: 2000, 2001

Inter Milan

- Serie A: 2005–06, 2006–07, 2008–09
- Coppa Italia: 2004–05, 2005–06
- Supercoppa Italiana: 2005, 2006, 2008

Corinthians

- Série A: 2011

Brazil U17

- FIFA U-17 World Cup: 1999

Brazil U20

- South American Youth Championship: 2001

Brazil

- Copa América: 2004
- FIFA Confederations Cup: 2005

Individual

- South American U-20 Championship Golden Shoe: 2001
- FIFA World Youth Championship Silver Shoe: 2001
- Ballon d'Or: 2004 (6th place), 2005 (7th place)
- FIFA World Player of the Year: 2004 (6th place), 2005 (5th place)
- Pirata d'Oro (Internazionale Player of the Year): 2004
- Copa América Golden Ball: 2004
- Copa América Golden Shoe: 2004
- Copa América Team of the Tournament: 2004
- FIFA Confederations Cup Golden Ball: 2005
- FIFA Confederations Cup Golden Shoe: 2005
- IFFHS World's Top Goal Scorer: 2005
- Campeonato Brasileiro Série A Team of the Year: 2009
- Campeonato Brasileiro Série A top goalscorer: 2009
- Bola de Ouro: 2009
- Bola de Prata: 2009
