= Devis Nossa =

Italian footballer (born 1985)

Personal information
- Date of birth: 7 February 1985 (age 41)
- Place of birth: Treviglio, Italy
- Height: 1.85 m (6 ft 1 in)
- Positions: Centre back; right back

Youth career
- –1997: Orsa Treviglio
- 1997–2005: Inter Milan
- 2004–2005: → Vicenza (loan)

Senior career*
Years	Team	Apps	(Gls)
2005–2006	Inter Milan	0	(0)
2005	→ Pavia (loan)	8	(0)
2005–2006	→ Acireale (loan)	27	(0)
2006–2007	San Marino	30	(1)
2007–2008	Pro Patria	11	(0)
2008–2010	Manfredonia	59	(6)
2010	Barletta	2	(0)
2010–2014	Pro Patria	103	(10)
2014–2015	Entella	3	(0)
2015–2016	Lumezzane	48	(2)
2016–2017	Como	33	(3)
2017–2018	Pistoiese	26	(0)
2018–2019	Albissola	24	(1)
2019–2020	Rende	19	(2)
2020–2021	Picerno	22	(3)
2021	Caratese	9	(0)
2021–2022	Sanremese	17	(2)
2022–2023	Caronnese	13	(0)
2023–2024	Magenta		
Total		454	(30)

International career
2003–2004	Italy U19	12	(0)
2004–2005	Italy U20	7	(0)

Managerial career
- 2026–: Inter Milan (youth)
- * Club domestic league appearances and goals

Devis Nossa (born 7 February 1985) is an Italian football coach and former footballer who is currently as a head coach for Inter youth team.

== Biography ==
=== Inter ===
Born in Treviglio, Lombardy, Nossa started his career with Internazionale, one of the biggest team in Lombardy. In 2002, he was promoted from Allievi Nazionali to senior youth team – Primavera. He finished as 2 consecutive Primavera League runner-up in 2003 and 2004 as vice-captain. Started to play as a central defender, he also played as a right winger and right back for the Primavera team. He also call-up three times for the first team in competitive matches, wore no.34 as unused bench against Juventus in 2003–04 Coppa Italia, against Sochaux as unused bench in 2003–04 UEFA Cup. and against Brescia in 2003–04 Serie A. Nossa made his debut and only appearance for the first team on 31 May 2003, substituted Marco Materazzi in the second half. The friendly match ended in 1–0 win against Fiorentina

=== Serie C1 clubs ===
In July 2004, he left for Serie B club Vicenza but failed to make any appearances. In December 2004, he was loaned to Serie C1 side Pavia. He substituted right winger Luca Ceccarelli in promotion playoff, his only appearance at that round.

In 2005–06 Serie C1 season, at first he was loaned to Pizzighettone along with Matteo Deinite and Alberto Quadri. but loaned to Acireale along with Alex Cordaz and Fabrizio Biava on 31 August. He was in the starting XI (as right back) for Acireale in the relegation playoffs, losing 2–3 to Juve Stabia in aggregate.

In June 2006, he left for San Marino Calcio in co-ownership deal, for €20,000, re-joined former Pavia team-mate Ceccarelli. He was the regular of the team, and also played for the team at relegation playoffs, again as losing side.

In June 2007, Inter bought him back for a peppercorn fee and re-sold to Pro Patria in another co-ownership deal for €500. He only made a handful appearances for the Lombardy side, as the understudy of Marco Candrina; however Nossa also played in relegation playoffs as substitute and as a starter, again as losing side.

In June 2008, Inter transferred the remain 50% rights to Pro Patria for free.

=== Manfredonia ===
In August 2008, he left for Lega Pro Seconda Divisione (ex-Serie C2) club Manfredonia. Manfredonia collected 41 points that season, same figure with the 10th place team but with a poorer goal scoring record. But after counted the deducted point, Manfredonia had to play relegation playoffs against the 2nd last team Isola Liri. Manfredonia won 5–0 in aggregate, and Nossa played as a central back. In 2009–10 Lega Pro Seconda Divisione, Nossa remained in the starting XI and finished in the mid-table with team. Nossa left the club on 1 July 2010 and the team soon went bankrupt, and choose not to appeal to decision that expelled the team from the professional league.

=== Barletta/Returned to Pro Patria ===
On 1 July 2010, Nossa became the first signing of Lega Pro Prima Divisione newcomer Barletta on free transfer. He signed a 1-year contract. He was the starting central backs along with Fabio Lucioni in the first two round. However, on 31 August 2010, he was sold to his former club Pro Patria in exchange with right back Mattia Masiero. On the same day Barletta also signed central back Fabrizio Anselmi.

Nossa almost played all the league match for Pro Patria in 2011–12 season. On 2 April 2012 he was suspended for two matches for an incident when playing for Manfredonia. Nossa also suspended in round 27 for 4th caution and again in round 30 for the sent off.

=== Entella ===
On 14 January 2014 he was signed by Virtus Entella for the remainder of 2013–14 Lega Pro Prima Divisione. In 2016 summer Nossa passes to Calcio Como.

=== Rende ===
On 7 September 2019, he signed a 2-year contract with Rende.

=== Serie D ===
On 7 September 2021, he joined Folgore Caratese.

On 29 December 2021 he joined Sanre

=== International career ===
Devis Nossa was the starting defender for Azzurrini at 2004 UEFA European Under-19 Championship second qualifying round and in the final tournament. He was a regular of the under-20 team at Four Nations Tournament but failed to receive a call-up to 2005 FIFA World Youth Championship, coach Paolo Berrettini call-up rising star Lino Marzoratti instead and Nossa was played for Pavia in promotion playoffs on the same day.

== Honours ==
- Internazionale (youth)
  - Runner-up
    - Campionato Nazionale Primavera: 2003, 2004
    - Coppa Italia Primavera: 2004
