= Mathieu Moreau =

French former footballer (born 1983)

Personal information
- Full name: Mathieu Christian Moreau
- Date of birth: 22 February 1983 (age 43)
- Place of birth: Quimper, France
- Height: 1.89 m (6 ft 2 in)
- Position: Goalkeeper

Youth career
- 2000–2001: Nantes
- 2001–2003: Internazionale

Senior career*
Years	Team	Apps	(Gls)
2003–2006	Internazionale	0	(0)
2003–2004	→ Spezia (loan)	26	(0)
2004–2005	→ Ternana (loan)	6	(0)
2005–2006	→ Lucchese (loan)	3	(0)
2006–2008	Lucchese	1	(0)
2007	→ Pro Sesto (loan)	20	(0)
2008–2012	Varese	87	(0)
2012–2013	Venezia	15	(0)

International career
- France U-19
- * Club domestic league appearances and goals

Mathieu Christian Moreau (born 22 February 1983) is a French former footballer who played as a goalkeeper.

== Football career ==
=== Internazionale ===
Mathieu Moreau started his career in the famous youth academy at Nantes. In the summer of 2001, he joined Internazionale. He won Campionato Nazionale Primavera in summer 2002 as Alex Cordaz's backup.

In summer 2003, he was farmed to Spezia (Serie C1), along with Mattia Altobelli.

A year later, he was loaned to Ternana (Serie B), along with Fabrizio Biava.

=== Lucchese ===
In summer 2005, he was loaned again, this time to Lucchese (Serie C1), along with Fabrizio Biava. He was the second choice goalkeeper behind Alex Brunner.

In summer 2006, Lucchese bought half of the player's registration rights, for a fee of €500, and a year later bought all the registration rights. But, along with Paolo Castelli, who was also owned by Inter, he failed to play regularly, being behind Brunner, and later Massimo Gazzoli, in the pecking order.

=== Varese ===
In summer 2008, Varese signed him as a free agent, after Lucchese folded. He quickly became the first choice goalkeeper, and won 2009 Lega Pro Seconda Divisione. In the next season, Varese finished in second place of the Lega Pro Prima Divisione, as well as winning the promotion playoffs.

However, he was the understudy of Massimo Zappino in 2010–11 Serie B. The team finished fourth, but failed to win the promotion playoffs. After the departure of Zappino in late August 2011, Moreau became first choice again in the first four rounds - with zero wins, two draws and two losses. Since round five, Walter Bressan became the first choice.

He retired in 2013, aged 30, to move to Canada, the country his wife is originally from.
