= Dino Marino =

Italian footballer (born 1985)

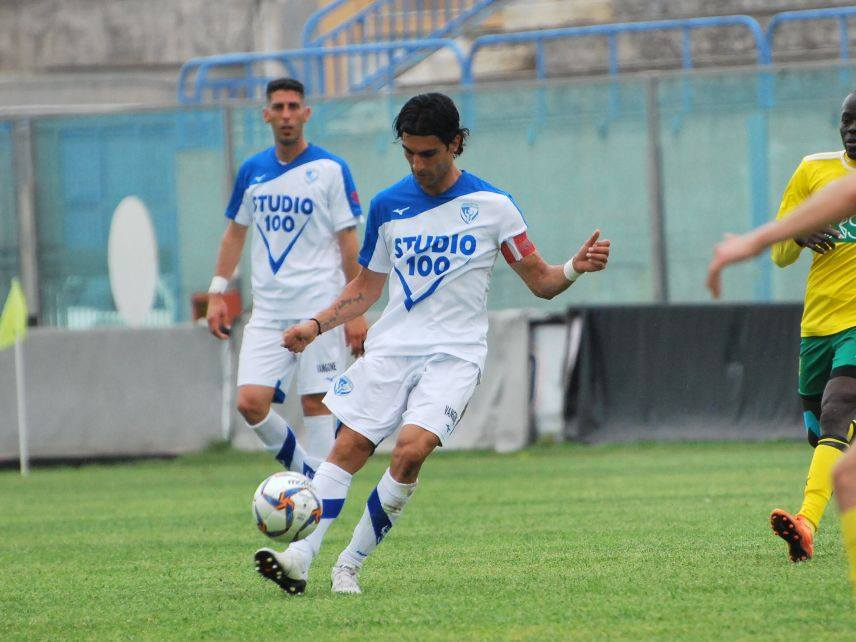

Personal information
- Date of birth: 23 May 1985 (age 41)
- Place of birth: Naples, Italy
- Height: 1.76 m (5 ft 9 in)
- Position: Central midfielder

Team information
- Current team: Virtus Matino

Youth career
- Lecce
- 2002–2005: Inter Milan

Senior career*
Years	Team	Apps	(Gls)
2004–2005	Inter Milan	2	(0)
2005–2006	Arezzo	1	(0)
2006–2008	Pro Patria	51	(5)
2008–2009	Südtirol	12	(1)
2009–2010	Ostuni	8	(0)
2010–2011	Copertino	?	(?)
2011–2012	Atletico Racale	?	(?)
2012–2013	Galatina	?	(?)
2013–2014	Virtus Francavilla	?	(?)
2014–2015	Casarano	?	(?)
2015–2018	FC Francavilla	100	(15)
2018–2020	Brindisi	26+	(3+)
2020–2021	Martina	?	(?)
2021	Toma Maglie	?	(?)
2021–2022	Ostuni	?	(?)
2022–2024	Galatina	?	(?)
2024	Veglie	?	(?)
2024–	Virtus Matino	?	(?)
- * Club domestic league appearances and goals

Dino Marino (born 23 May 1985) is an Italian footballer who plays as a central midfielder for Virtus Matino

== Football career ==
He started his career at Internazionale. After played 3 games for Inter, including a match in 2004–05 Coppa Italia, Marino was graduated from the under-20 youth team and farmed to Serie B team Arezzo along with Nicola Beati in a joint ownership bid. But Marino was then loaned to Serie C1 team Pro Patria after just 1 appearance, joining Carlo Raffaele Trezzi, also from the youth rank of Inter. In June 2006 Inter bought back Marino.

In August 2006, Pro Patria bought Marino in another co-ownership deal, and Inter sold remain half to Pro Patria in June 2007. In July 2008 he was signed by South Tyrol. However in November he broke his leg (fibula & tibia) and missed the rest of the season. At the end of season he joined Serie D team Ostuni.
