= Yrius Carboni =

Brazilian footballer

Personal information
- Full name: Yrius Roberto Carboni
- Date of birth: 22 July 1986 (age 40)
- Place of birth: Salvador, Brazil
- Position: Striker

Youth career
- –2003: Vitória
- 2003–2005: Internazionale
- 2005–2006: Vitória

Senior career*
Years	Team	Apps	(Gls)
2006–2007	Helmond Sport	3	(0)
2007–2008	FC Eindhoven	8	(1)
- * Club domestic league appearances and goals as of 23 May 2008

Yrius Roberto Carboni (born 22 July 1986 in Salvador) is a Brazilian football player who is unattached. He played in the Netherlands for FC Eindhoven and Helmond Sport.
