= Mattia Masiero =

Italian footballer

Personal information
- Full name: Mattia Giovanni Masiero
- Date of birth: 18 October 1986 (age 40)
- Place of birth: Valdagno, Italy
- Height: 1.80 m (5 ft 11 in)
- Position: Right back

Youth career
- Vicenza

Senior career*
Years	Team	Apps	(Gls)
2006–2007	Ancona	23	(0)
2007–2009	Torino	0	(0)
2007–2009	→ Ancona (loan)	18	(2)
2009–2010	Pro Patria	6	(0)
2010	→ Sorrento (loan)	6	(0)
2010–2012	Barletta	30	(0)
Total		83	(2)
- * Club domestic league appearances and goals

Mattia Giovanni Masiero (born 18 October 1986) is an Italian former footballer who plays as a right back.

== Biography ==
Born in Valdagno, the Province of Vicenza, Veneto, Masiero started his career at Vicenza. In June 2006 he graduated from Primavera under-20 team and soon joined Serie C1 club Ancona. He made an impressive 23 appearances in his maiden season. In July 2007, Masiero was signed by Serie A club Torino. In exchange, Pasquale Schiattarella and Claudio De Sousa joined the Serie C1 club. Masiero played for Torino in pre-season friendlies, finished as the runner-up of Trofeo Spagnolo. However, on 20 August 2007 Masiero also returned to Ancona, Veneto. The loan was renewed on 1 July 2008. With Ancona, he made 18 more league appearances but only 3 times in 2008–09 Serie B. Masiero also played once out of 4 matches in the 2008 promotion playoffs. In June 2009, Ancona gave up the remain 50% registration to Torino but the Piedmontese transferred Masiero to Pro Patria. Masiero only played 12 times in his third season in the Italian third division, which renamed to Lega Pro Prima Divisione. He played 6 games each for Pro Patria and his loan club Sorrento.

On 31 August 2010 Masiero was exchanged with Devis Nossa. Masiero made his club debut on 5 September, replacing Benedetto Lorusso. In the next round, he became the starting defender. However, he only made 8 more starts for Barletta in 2010–11 Lega Pro Prima Divisione.
