= Giovanni Serao =

Italian footballer

Personal information
- Date of birth: 2 March 1977
- Place of birth: Minturno, Italy
- Position(s): Defender

Senior career*
Years	Team	Apps	(Gls)
1995–1996	Padova	5	(1)
1996–1997	Prato	19	(0)
1997–1998	Hellas Verona	9	(0)
1999–2000	Padova	41	(0)
2000–2001	S.P.A.L.	10	(0)
2000–2001	Ravenna	20	(0)
2001–2002	Padova	4	(0)
2002–2003	Reggiana	17	(0)
2003–2004	Novara	22	(1)
2004–2005	Chieti	12	(0)
2005–2007	Valenzana Mado	48	(0)
2007–2008	Torres	25	(2)
2008–2009	Südtirol	25	(2)
2009–2010	Casarano	22	(3)
2010–2011	Teramo		
2010–2011	Real Rimini		
2011–2012	Valenzana Mado	26	(0)
2014–2015	Orizzonti United		
2014–2015	Asti		
2015–2016	Saronno		
2016–2017	Sestese		
2017–2018	Briga Novarese		
- *Club domestic league appearances and goals

Giovanni Serao (born 2 March 1977) is an Italian retired footballer.

== Career ==
Serao started his senior career with Padova in Serie A, making five league appearances and scoring a goal against Cagliari, causing him to "almost make a lap of the pitch for joy". However, after leaving the club, he never played at the top level again.

While playing for Novara in Serie C, Serao received an offer from Torino in Serie B, but the transfer never happened and he signed for Chieti in the same division instead.

In 2015, Serao claimed that he treated professional football "in the early years, as a fun and never as a job". In the summer of 2015 he moved to Fbc Saronno in Eccellenza.

In 2016, he was called to the Trecate bench in the First Category, but after only two days he resigned. In June 2016 he announced his return to football with Briga in Promozione.
