= 2004–05 Coppa Italia =

Tournament details
- Country: Italy
- Dates: 14 Aug 2004 – 15 June 2005
- Teams: 48

Final positions
- Champions: Internazionale (4th title)
- Runners-up: Roma

Tournament statistics
- Matches played: 94
- Goals scored: 299 (3.18 per match)
- Top goal scorer: Andrea Lazzari (9 goals)

The 2004–05 Coppa Italia was the 58th edition of the national domestic tournament. Roma and Internazionale were the finalists. Inter won the tournament 3–0 aggregate in the final.

== Group stage ==
=== Group 1 ===
| Pos | Team | Pld | W | D | L | GF | GA | GD | Pts |
|---|---|---|---|---|---|---|---|---|---|
| 1 | Torino (B) | 3 | 2 | 1 | 0 | 13 | 7 | +6 | 7 |
| 2 | Lumezzane (C) | 3 | 1 | 1 | 1 | 5 | 8 | −3 | 4 |
| 3 | Genoa (B) | 3 | 1 | 1 | 1 | 7 | 6 | +1 | 4 |
| 4 | Empoli (B) | 3 | 0 | 1 | 2 | 4 | 8 | −4 | 1 |

| Team #1 | Team #2 | Results |
|---|---|---|
| Empoli | Genoa | 0–2 |
| Lumezzane | Torino | 1–5 |
| Genoa | Lumezzane | 2–3 |
| Torino | Empoli | 5–3 |
| Genoa | Torino | 3–3 |
| Lumezzane | Empoli | 1–1 |

=== Group 2 ===
| Pos | Team | Pld | W | D | L | GF | GA | GD | Pts |
|---|---|---|---|---|---|---|---|---|---|
| 1 | Atalanta (A) | 3 | 2 | 1 | 0 | 9 | 4 | +5 | 7 |
| 2 | AlbinoLeffe (B) | 3 | 2 | 0 | 1 | 3 | 3 | 0 | 6 |
| 3 | Vicenza (B) | 3 | 1 | 0 | 2 | 4 | 6 | −2 | 3 |
| 4 | Pro Patria (C) | 3 | 0 | 1 | 2 | 3 | 6 | −3 | 1 |

| Team #1 | Team #2 | Results |
|---|---|---|
| AlbinoLeffe | Pro Patria | 2–0 |
| Vicenza | Atalanta | 2–4 |
| Atalanta | AlbinoLeffe | 3–0 |
| Pro Patria | Vicenza | 1–2 |
| Pro Patria | Atalanta | 2–2 |
| Vicenza | AlbinoLeffe | 0–1 |

=== Group 3 ===
| Pos | Team | Pld | W | D | L | GF | GA | GD | Pts |
|---|---|---|---|---|---|---|---|---|---|
| 1 | Triestina (B) | 3 | 3 | 0 | 0 | 6 | 2 | +4 | 9 |
| 2 | Modena (B) | 3 | 2 | 0 | 1 | 5 | 3 | +2 | 6 |
| 3 | Treviso(B) | 3 | 0 | 1 | 2 | 4 | 7 | −3 | 1 |
| 4 | Venezia (B) | 3 | 0 | 1 | 2 | 2 | 5 | −3 | 1 |

| Team #1 | Team #2 | Results |
|---|---|---|
| Modena | Triestina | 0–1 |
| Venezia | Treviso | 1–1 |
| Treviso | Modena | 1–2 |
| Triestina | Venezia | 1–0 |
| Triestina | Treviso | 4–2 |
| Venezia | Modena | 1–3 |

=== Group 4 ===
| Pos | Team | Pld | W | D | L | GF | GA | GD | Pts |
|---|---|---|---|---|---|---|---|---|---|
| 1 | Livorno (A) | 3 | 2 | 1 | 0 | 6 | 4 | +2 | 7 |
| 2 | Cesena (B) | 3 | 1 | 2 | 0 | 4 | 3 | +1 | 5 |
| 3 | Ascoli (B) | 3 | 1 | 1 | 1 | 3 | 3 | 0 | 4 |
| 4 | Arezzo (B) | 3 | 0 | 0 | 3 | 3 | 6 | −3 | 0 |

| Team #1 | Team #2 | Results |
|---|---|---|
| Ascoli | Arezzo | 1–0 |
| Cesena | Livorno | 1–1 |
| Arezzo | Cesena | 1–2 |
| Livorno | Ascoli | 2–1 |
| Arezzo | Livorno | 2–3 |
| Cesena | Ascoli | 1–1 |

=== Group 5 ===
| Pos | Team | Pld | W | D | L | GF | GA | GD | Pts |
|---|---|---|---|---|---|---|---|---|---|
| 1 | Fiorentina (A) | 3 | 2 | 1 | 0 | 6 | 0 | +6 | 7 |
| 2 | Piacenza (B) | 3 | 2 | 1 | 0 | 5 | 0 | +5 | 7 |
| 3 | Hellas Verona (B) | 3 | 1 | 0 | 2 | 2 | 5 | −3 | 3 |
| 4 | Como (C) | 3 | 0 | 0 | 3 | 0 | 8 | −8 | 0 |

| Team #1 | Team #2 | Results |
|---|---|---|
| Como | Hellas Verona | 0–2 |
| Piacenza | Fiorentina | 0–0 |
| Fiorentina | Como | 3–0 |
| Hellas Verona | Piacenza | 0–2 |
| Como | Piacenza | 0–3 |
| Fiorentina | Hellas Verona | 3–0 |

=== Group 6 ===
| Pos | Team | Pld | W | D | L | GF | GA | GD | Pts |
|---|---|---|---|---|---|---|---|---|---|
| 1 | Ternana (B) | 3 | 2 | 0 | 1 | 4 | 3 | +1 | 6 |
| 2 | Rimini (C) | 3 | 1 | 1 | 1 | 4 | 4 | 0 | 4 |
| 3 | Perugia (B) | 3 | 1 | 1 | 1 | 3 | 2 | +1 | 4 |
| 4 | Pescara (B) | 3 | 0 | 2 | 1 | 5 | 7 | −2 | 2 |

| Team #1 | Team #2 | Results |
|---|---|---|
| Perugia | Ternana | 2–0 |
| Pescara | Rimini | 3–3 |
| Rimini | Perugia | 1–0 |
| Ternana | Pescara | 3–1 |
| Pescara | Perugia | 1–1 |
| Ternana | Rimini | 1–0 |

=== Group 7 ===
| Pos | Team | Pld | W | D | L | GF | GA | GD | Pts |
|---|---|---|---|---|---|---|---|---|---|
| 1 | Salernitana (B) | 3 | 3 | 0 | 0 | 7 | 3 | +4 | 9 |
| 2 | Catania (B) | 3 | 2 | 0 | 1 | 6 | 3 | +3 | 6 |
| 3 | Catanzaro (B) | 3 | 0 | 1 | 2 | 2 | 5 | −3 | 1 |
| 4 | Avellino (C) | 3 | 0 | 1 | 2 | 3 | 7 | −4 | 1 |

| Team #1 | Team #2 | Results |
|---|---|---|
| Avellino | Salernitana | 1–3 |
| Catania | Catanzaro | 2–0 |
| Catanzaro | Avellino | 1–1 |
| Salernitana | Catania | 2–1 |
| Catania | Avellino | 3–1 |
| Salernitana | Catanzaro | 2–1 |

=== Group 8 ===
| Pos | Team | Pld | W | D | L | GF | GA | GD | Pts |
|---|---|---|---|---|---|---|---|---|---|
| 1 | Messina (A) | 3 | 3 | 0 | 0 | 7 | 1 | +6 | 9 |
| 2 | Crotone (B) | 3 | 1 | 1 | 1 | 5 | 2 | +3 | 4 |
| 3 | Bari (B) | 3 | 1 | 0 | 2 | 3 | 7 | −4 | 3 |
| 4 | Acireale (C) | 3 | 0 | 1 | 2 | 2 | 6 | −4 | 1 |

| Team #1 | Team #2 | Results |
|---|---|---|
| Acireale | Crotone | 1–1 |
| Bari | Messina | 1–2 |
| Crotone | Bari | 4–0 |
| Messina | Acireale | 4–0 |
| Bari | Acireale | 2–1 |
| Crotone | Messina | 0–1 |

== Knockout stage ==
Second stage
Ternana (B) | 1 | 4 | 5
Bologna (A) | 3 | 3 | 6
Internazionale
bye
Juventus
bye
Reggina (A) | 1 | 2 | 3
Atalanta (A) | 4 | 3 | 7
Sampdoria (A)
bye
Chievo (A) | 0 | 1 | 1
Torino (B) | 1 | 1 | 2
Lazio
bye
Cagliari(A) | 3 | 3 | 6
Triestina (B) | 1 | 1 | 2
Udinese
bye
Lecce (A) | 1 | 3 | 4
Livorno (A) | 2 | 1 | 3
Milan
bye
Palermo (A) | 1 | 2 | 3
Salernitana(B) | 2 | 0 | 2
Parma
bye
Brescia (A) | 1 | 1(2(aet)) | 2
Fiorentina (A) | 1 | 1(2(aet)) | 2
Siena(A) | 1 | 1 | 2
Messina (A) | 0 | 1 | 1
Roma
bye

Round of 16
Bologna | 1 | 1 | 2
Internazionale | 3 | 3 | 6
Juventus | 1 | 3 | 4
Atalanta | 2 | 3 | 5
Sampdoria | 2 | 1 | 3
Torino | 0 | 2 | 2
Lazio | 1 | 2(2(aet)) | 3
Cagliari | 2 | 1(3(aet)) | 5
Udinese | 5 | 3 | 8
Lecce | 4 | 4 | 8
Milan | 2 | 2 | 4
Palermo | 1 | 0 | 1
Parma | 0 | 0 | 0
Fiorentina | 2 | 3 | 5
Siena | 2 | 1 | 3
Roma | 1 | 5 | 6

Quarter-finals
Internazionale | 1 | 3 | 4
Atalanta | 0 | 0 | 0
Sampdoria | 0 | 3 | 3
Cagliari | 2 | 2 | 4
Udinese | 2 | 4 | 6
Milan | 3 | 1 | 4
Fiorentina | 0 | 1(6p) | 1
Roma | 1 | 0(7p) | 1

Semi-finals
Internazionale | 1 | 3 | 4
Cagliari | 1 | 1 | 2
Udinese | 1 | 1 | 2
Roma | 1 | 2 | 3

Finals
Internazionale | 2 | 1 | 3
Roma | 0 | 0 | 0

== Final ==
=== First leg ===
12 June 2005
21:30

| Roma | 0–2 | Internazionale |
|---|---|---|
| | | Adriano 30', 36' |

Stadio Olimpico, Rome
Attendance: 73,437
Referee: Pierluigi Collina

=== Second leg ===
15 June 2005
20:45

| Internazionale | 1–0 | Roma |
|---|---|---|
| Mihajlović 52' |

San Siro, Milan
Attendance: 72,034
Referee: Matteo Trefoloni

Internazionale won 3–0 on aggregate.

== Top goalscorers ==
| Rank | Player | Club | Goals |
|---|---|---|---|
| 1 | (Italy) Andrea Lazzari | Atalanta | 9 |
| 2 | (Nigeria) Obafemi Martins | Internazionale | 6 |
| 3 | (Uruguay) José María Franco | Torino | 5 |
| 4 | (Italy) Massimo Marazzina | Torino | 4 |
| 4 | (Italy) Gianfranco Zola | Cagliari | 4 |
| 4 | (Italy) Antonio Di Natale | Udinese | 4 |
| 4 | (Italy) David Di Michele | Udinese | 4 |
| 4 | (Italy) Raffaele Palladino | Salernitana | 4 |
