= 2004–05 AS Roma season =

Roma
2004–05 season
- President: Franco Sensi
- Manager: Cesare Prandelli (until 12 September 2004); Rudi Völler (until 3 October 2004); Luigi Delneri (until 13 March 2005); Bruno Conti
- Stadium: Stadio Olimpico
- Serie A: 8th
- Coppa Italia: Runners-up
- UEFA Champions League: Group stage
- Top goalscorer: League: Vincenzo Montella (21); All: Vincenzo Montella (23)
- Average home league attendance: 49,631
Home colours	Away colours	Third colours

The problems started before the season began, with coach Fabio Capello signing for Juventus, and key players Emerson and Walter Samuel departing. That Samuel departed to Real Madrid was greeted with disappointment, but the move was thought to be necessary given the financial struggles of Roma. The moves for Capello and Emerson in contrast, were controversial, with Rome's mayor Walter Veltroni even having to step in to calm feelings down, when Capello had decided to buy Emerson to the Turin club.

Controversy resumed when Roma signed French defender Philippe Mexès from Auxerre, despite a rolling contract. Auxerre took Roma to UEFA court, and in July 2005, Roma was suspended from the transfer market for a full calendar year. In the midst of chaos, new coach Cesare Prandelli decided to resign when finding out his wife was seriously ill (she would survive another two years before dying), and Prandelli returned to football with Fiorentina one year later.

Rudi Völler, formerly a striker at the club, and the man in charge when Germany reached the final of the 2002 FIFA World Cup, took over, but the German did not last long, complaining of a lack of organisation. Former Chievo coach Luigi Delneri, who had been sacked from European champions Porto in pre-season, due to spending too much time in his native Italy, took charge, but the squad lacked confidence, and the scandals and internal fighting caused Roma to slip into the relegation fight. Former club midfielder Bruno Conti saved the club from relegation, owing much to striking duo Vincenzo Montella and Francesco Totti.

A notable incident during the season was referee Anders Frisk being hit by a coin in a Champions League fixture against Dynamo Kyiv, as Roma crashed out of the tournament in its initial phase. Due to Roma's transfer ban, the club could not get rid of Cassano until January 2006, when Real Madrid bought him.

== Players ==
=== Squad information ===
Last updated on 29 May 2005
Appearances include league matches only

No.	Name	Nat	Position(s)	Date of birth (Age at end of season)	Signed from	Signed in	Apps.	Goals
Goalkeepers
1	Gianluca Curci	(Italy)	GK	12 July 1985 (aged 19)	(Italy) Youth Sector	2004	11	0
12	Carlo Zotti	(Italy)	GK	3 September 1982 (aged 22)	(Italy) Palermo	2001	14	0
22	Ivan Pelizzoli	(Italy)	GK	18 November 1980 (aged 24)	(Italy) Atalanta	2001	72	0
Defenders
2	Christian Panucci (Vice-Captain)	(Italy)	RB / CB	12 April 1973 (aged 32)	(France) Monaco	2001	110	4
3	Abel Xavier	(Portugal)	LB	30 November 1972 (aged 32)	(Germany) Hannover 96	2004	3	0
5	Philippe Mexès	(France)	CB	30 March 1982 (aged 23)	(France) Auxerre	2004	28	0
8	Matteo Ferrari	(Italy)	CB	5 December 1979 (aged 25)	(Italy) Parma	2004	35	0
13	Cristian Chivu	(Romania)	LB / CB	26 October 1980 (aged 24)	(Netherlands) Ajax	2003	32	4
19	Giuseppe Scurto	(Italy)	CB	5 January 1984 (aged 21)	(Italy) Youth Sector	2004	9	0
25	Leandro Cufré	(Argentina)	LB	9 May 1978 (aged 27)	(Argentina) Gimnasia La Plata	2002	41	0
28	Aleandro Rosi	(Italy)	RB	17 May 1987 (aged 18)	(Italy) Youth Sector	2004	1	0
31	Traianos Dellas	(Greece)	CB	31 January 1976 (aged 29)	(Italy) Perugia	2002	44	2
Midfielders
4	Daniele De Rossi	(Italy)	DM / CM	24 July 1983 (aged 21)	(Italy) Youth Sector	2001	51	4
15	Olivier Dacourt	(France)	AM / CM	25 September 1974 (aged 30)	(England) Leeds United	2003	68	1
17	Damiano Tommasi	(Italy)	DM / CM	17 May 1974 (aged 31)	(Italy) Hellas Verona	1996	236	12
20	Simone Perrotta	(Italy)	LM / CM / AM	17 September 1977 (aged 27)	(Italy) Chievo	2004	30	3
23	Alberto Aquilani	(Italy)	CM / AM	7 July 1984 (aged 20)	(Italy) Youth Sector	2002	30	0
28	Valerio Virga	(Italy)	CM	6 June 1986 (aged 19)	(Italy) Youth Sector	2004	6	0
29	Leandro Greco	(Italy)	CM	19 July 1986 (aged 18)	(Italy) Youth Sector	2003	1	0
30	Mancini	(Brazil)	LW / RW / AM	1 August 1980 (aged 24)	(Italy) Venezia	2003	67	12
Forwards
9	Vincenzo Montella	(Italy)	CF / ST	18 June 1974 (aged 31)	(Italy) Sampdoria	1999	155	79
10	Francesco Totti (Captain)	(Italy)	AM / LW / SS / CF / ST	27 September 1976 (aged 28)	(Italy) Youth Sector	1992	301	98
11	Daniele Corvia	(Italy)	CF / ST	22 November 1984 (aged 20)	(Italy) Youth Sector	2003	16	0
18	Antonio Cassano	(Italy)	ST / SS	12 July 1982 (aged 22)	(Italy) Bari	2001	113	37
26	Alessio Cerci	(Italy)	RW / SS	23 July 1987 (aged 17)	(Italy) Youth Sector	2003	3	0
99	Mido	(Egypt)	CF / ST	23 February 1983 (aged 22)	(France) Marseille	2004	8	0
Players transferred during the season
7	Luigi Sartor	(Italy)	LB / RB / CB	30 January 1975 (aged 30)	(Italy) Parma	2002	19	0
21	Gaetano D'Agostino	(Italy)	CM / AM	3 June 1982 (aged 23)	(Italy) Bari	2003	22	1
24	Marco Delvecchio	(Italy)	CF / ST	7 April 1973 (aged 32)	(Italy) Internazionale	1995	231	62
32	Vincent Candela	(France)	LB / LWB	24 October 1973 (aged 31)	(France) Guingamp	1997	210	14

=== Transfers ===
In
Pos.	Name	from	Type
MF	Matteo Brighi	Juventus	(€16 million )
MF	Simone Perrotta	Chievo	(€7.2 million )
DF	Philippe Mexès	Auxerre	(€7 million )
DF	Matteo Ferrari	Parma	(€7.25 million )
FW	Mido	Olympique Marseille	(€6 million )

Out
Pos.	Name	To	Type
MF	Emerson	Juventus	(€28 million )
DF	Walter Samuel	Real Madrid	(€23 million )
MF	Francisco Lima	Lokomotiv Moscow	(€5.7 million )
GK	Cristiano Lupatelli	Fiorentina	end of contract
DF	Jonathan Zebina	Juventus	end of contract
MF	Gianni Guigou	Fiorentina	end of contract
DF	Manuel Cattani	La Chaux-de-Fonds	end of contract
DF	Damiano Ferronetti	Parma	-
DF	Simone Piva	Triestina	loan
MF	Matteo Brighi	Chievo Verona	loan
MF	Adewale Dauda Wahab	Ternana	loan
MF	Daniele Galloppa	Triestina	loan
FW	Olasunkanmi Akande Ajide	Venezia	loan

==== Winter ====
In
Pos.	Name	To	Type
FW	Felipe Spellmeier	Juventude	loan
DF	Abel Xavier		free

Out
Pos.	Name	To	Type
FW	Mido	Tottenham Hotspur	loan
MF	Gaetano D'Agostino	Messina	loan
DF	Luigi Sartor	Genoa CFC	loan
FW	Marco Delvecchio	Brescia	released
DF	Vincent Candela	Bolton Wanderers	released
FW	Olasunkanmi Akande Ajide	Fidelis Andria	loan

== Competitions ==
=== Overall ===
Competition	Started round	Final position	First match	Last match
Serie A	Matchday 1	8th	12 September 2004	29 May 2005
Coppa Italia	Round of 16	Runners-up	19 November 2004	15 June 2005
Champions League	Group stage	Group stage	15 September 2004	8 December 2004

Last updated: 15 June 2005

=== Serie A ===
==== League table ====
Pos	Team	Pld	W	D	L	GF	GA	GD	Pts	Qualification or relegation
6	Palermo	38	12	17	9	48	44	+4	53	Qualification to UEFA Cup first round
7	Messina	38	12	12	14	44	52	−8	48	
8	Roma (Note: Roma gained entry to the 2005–06 UEFA Cup as 2004–05 Coppa Italia runners-up: champions Internazionale qualified to the 2005–06 UEFA Champions League.)	38	11	12	15	55	58	−3	45	Qualification to UEFA Cup first round
9	Livorno	38	11	12	15	49	60	−11	45	
10	Reggina	38	10	14	14	36	45	−9	44	

Source: 2004–05 Serie A, RSSSF.com, Soccerway
Rules for classification: 1) Points; 2) Head-to-head points; 3) Head-to-head goal difference; 4) Goal difference; 5) Goals scored; 6) Draw. (Note: Head-to-head record is used only after all the matches between the teams in question have been played).

==== Results summary ====
Overall								Home						Away					
Pld	W	D	L	GF	GA	GD	Pts	W	D	L	GF	GA	GD	W	D	L	GF	GA	GD
38	11	12	15	55	58	−3	45	6	8	5	31	26	+5	5	4	10	24	32	−8

Last updated: 29 May 2005.
Source: Competitive matches

==== Results by round ====
Round	1	2	3	4	5	6	7	8	9	10	11	12	13	14	15	16	17	18	19	20	21	22	23	24	25	26	27	28	29	30	31	32	33	34	35	36	37	38
Ground	H	A	H	A	H	A	H	A	H	A	H	A	A	H	A	H	A	H	A	A	H	A	H	A	H	A	H	A	H	A	H	H	A	H	A	H	A	H
Result	W	L	D	L	D	W	D	L	W	D	L	L	W	D	W	W	L	W	D	W	W	D	D	L	W	L	L	L	L	D	L	L	L	D	L	D	W	D
Position	5	9	12	13	14	12	9	13	9	9	13	15	11	11	9	7	8	6	7	6	5	6	6	7	7	7	7	7	8	7	8	12	12	13	14	14	8	8

Source: Competitive matches
A = Away; H = Home; W = Win; D = Draw; L = Loss; = Leader, UEFA Champions League Groups stage; = UEFA Champions League Groups stage; = UEFA Champions League Qualifying round; = 2005–06 UEFA Cup; = 2005–06 Serie B

==== Matches ====
12 September 2004 1	Roma	1–0	Fiorentina	Rome
15:00 CEST (UTC+02:00)	Candela (yellow card) 32'; Cassano (red card) 45+1'; Montella 53'; Totti (yellow card) 62'; De Rossi (yellow card) 67'	Report	Viali (red card) 13'; Obodo (yellow card) 33'	Stadium: Stadio Olimpico; Attendance: 57,724; Referee: Paolo Dondarini

19 September 2004 2	Messina	4–3	Roma	Messina
15:00 CEST (UTC+02:00)	Donati (yellow card) 15'; Parisi 21' (pen.); Sullo (yellow card) 23', (goal) 46'; Coppola (yellow card) 45+1'; Zoro (yellow card) 67'; Giampà 74'; Zampagna 78', (yellow card) 90+3'	Report	Montella 36', 64', 68'; Dacourt (yellow card) 45+1'; Mido (yellow card) 65'; Cufré (yellow card) 85'	Stadium: Stadio San Filippo; Attendance: 29,932; Referee: Pierluigi Collina

22 September 2004 3	Roma	2–2	Lecce	Rome
20:30 CEST (UTC+02:00)	Cassano 54'; Mancini 72'	Report	Pinardi (yellow card) 30'; Rullo (yellow card) 35'; Cassetti 41'; Bojinov 59'; Giacomazzi (yellow card) 89'	Stadium: Stadio Olimpico; Attendance: 45,097; Referee: Paolo Bertini

25 September 2004 4	Bologna	3–1	Roma	Bologna
19:00 CEST (UTC+02:00)	Meghni 5', 38', (yellow card) 7'; Juárez (yellow card) 20'; Cipriani (yellow card) 28' (yellow-red card) 39', (goal) 34'; Zagorakis (yellow card) 45+2' (yellow-red card) 52'; Sussi (yellow card) 73'	Report	Ferrari (yellow card) 15'; Perrotta (yellow card) 55'; Totti 60', (yellow card) 90+1'	Stadium: Stadio Renato Dall'Ara; Attendance: 18,594; Referee: Tiziano Pieri

3 October 2004 5	Roma	3–3	Internazionale	Rome
20:30 CEST (UTC+02:00)	Montella 9', (yellow card) 14'; De Rossi (yellow card) 44', (goal) 74'; Totti 57'	Report	Verón (yellow card) 10', (goal) 51'; Cambiasso 45+1', (yellow card) 71'; Recoba 54'	Stadium: Stadio Olimpico; Attendance: 61,075; Referee: Paolo Bertini

16 October 2004 6	Livorno	0–2	Roma	Livorno
18:00 CEST (UTC+02:00)	Vidigal (yellow card) 32'; Passoni (yellow card) 45+1'; Melara (yellow card) 70'	Report	Totti 30'; Cassano (yellow card) 40'; Montella 69'	Stadium: Stadio Armando Picchi; Attendance: 18,492; Referee: Emidio Morganti

24 October 2004 7	Roma	1–1	Palermo	Rome
15:00 CEST (UTC+02:00)	Totti 58' (pen.); Cufré (yellow card) 59'; Mancini (yellow card) 68'	Report	Grosso 32'; Mutarelli (yellow card) 42'; Corini (yellow card) 58'; Zaccardo (yellow card) 67'; Barzagli (yellow card) 78'	Stadium: Stadio Olimpico; Attendance: 54,399; Referee: Matteo Trefoloni

28 October 2004 8	Juventus	2–0	Roma	Turin
20:30 CEST (UTC+02:00)	Del Piero 31'; Nedvěd (yellow card) 37'; Emerson (yellow card) 45+2' (yellow-red card) 89'; Camoranesi (yellow card) 57'; Appiah (yellow card) 63'; Zalayeta 74'	Report	Cufré (yellow card) 9'; Perrotta (yellow card) 27'; Aquilani (yellow card) 66'; Dellas (yellow card) 77'	Stadium: Stadio delle Alpi; Attendance: 27,764; Referee: Pierluigi Collina

31 October 2004 9	Roma	5–1	Cagliari	Rome
15:00 CET (UTC+01:00)	Dellas 2'; Totti 6' (pen.); Montella (yellow card) 49', (goal) 90', 90+2'; Perrotta 64'; Sartor (yellow card) 67'	Report	Suazo 31', (yellow card) 31'; Abeijón (yellow card) 49'	Stadium: Stadio Olimpico; Attendance: 46,289; Referee: Roberto Rosetti

7 November 2004 10	Milan	1–1	Roma	Milan
20:30 CET (UTC+01:00)	Shevchenko 6'; Kaká (yellow card) 19'	Report	Aquilani (yellow card) 12'; Montella 48'; Scurto (yellow card) 89'	Stadium: San Siro; Attendance: 63,951; Referee: Paolo Bertini

10 November 2004 11	Roma	0–3	Udinese	Rome
20:30 CET (UTC+01:00)	Sartor (red card) 60'; De Rossi (yellow card) 71'; Scurto (yellow card) 78'	Report	Muntari (yellow card) 7'; Iaquinta 44', 82'; Pizarro 60' (pen.); Pinzi (yellow card) 70'	Stadium: Stadio Olimpico; Attendance: 40,390; Referee: Emidio Morganti

14 November 2004 12	Reggina	1–0	Roma	Reggio Calabria
15:00 CET (UTC+01:00)	Bonazzoli 15'; Colucci (yellow card) 55'; Mesto (yellow card) 69'; Franceschini (yellow card) 76'; Tedesco (red card) 90+3'	Report	Mexès (yellow card) 64'; Montella (yellow card) 75'; Totti (yellow card) 90+2'	Stadium: Stadio Oreste Granillo; Attendance: 14,919; Referee: Pierluigi Collina

27 November 2004 13	Siena	0–4	Roma	Siena
20:30 CET (UTC+01:00)		Report	De Rossi (yellow card) 62'; Ferrari (yellow card) 62'; Montella 68', 70'; Totti 71', 90+1'	Stadium: Stadio Artemio Franchi – Montepaschi Arena; Attendance: 10,202; Referee: Salvatore Racalbuto

5 December 2004 14	Roma	1–1	Sampdoria	Rome
20:30 CET (UTC+01:00)	Totti (yellow card) 26', (goal) 84' (pen.); D'Agostino (yellow card) 42'; Perrotta (yellow card) 78'	Report	Zenoni (yellow card) 59'; Pagano 81', (yellow card) 82'	Stadium: Stadio Olimpico; Attendance: 43,887; Referee: Daniele Tombolini

12 December 2004 15	Brescia	0–1	Roma	Brescia
15:00 CET (UTC+01:00)	Milanetto (yellow card) 31'	Report	Aquilani (yellow card) 30'; Panucci (yellow card) 76'; Mancini 90+4' (pen.)	Stadium: Stadio Mario Rigamonti; Attendance: 7,539; Referee: Paolo Dondarini

19 December 2004 16	Roma	5–1	Parma	Rome
15:00 CET (UTC+01:00)	Cassano 10', 50'; Totti 29', 58', (yellow card) 30'; Montella (yellow card) 35', (goal) 52'	Report	Pisanu (yellow card) 39' (yellow-red card) 74'; Bovo 45'; Contini (yellow card) 55'	Stadium: Stadio Olimpico; Attendance: 43,558; Referee: Salvatore Racalbuto

6 January 2005 17	Lazio	3–1	Roma	Rome
20:30 CET (UTC+01:00)	E. Filippini (yellow card) 8'; Liverani (yellow card) 14'; Di Canio 29'; A. Filippini (yellow card) 36'; César 74'; Rocchi 84', (yellow card) 86'	Report	Perrotta (yellow card) 36'; Mancini (yellow card) 47'; Cufré (yellow card) 60'; Cassano 68', (yellow card) 70'; Totti (yellow card) 87'; Aquilani (yellow card) 88'	Stadium: Stadio Olimpico; Attendance: 64,734; Referee: Paolo Dondarini

9 January 2005 18	Roma	2–1	Atalanta	Rome
15:00 CET (UTC+01:00)	Montella 40', 53'	Report	Sala (yellow card) 60'; Lazzari (yellow card) 68' (yellow-red card) 90+3'; Marcolini 85'	Stadium: Stadio Olimpico; Attendance: 42,057; Referee: Daniele Tombolini

16 January 2005 19	Chievo	2–2	Roma	Verona
15:00 CET (UTC+01:00)	Pellissier 15'; Tiribocchi 20', (yellow card) 21'; D'Anna (yellow card) 73'; Malagò (yellow card) 90+2'	Report	Montella 34', 56'; Ferrari (yellow card) 43'; Cassano (yellow card) 45+3'; Cufré (yellow card) 82'	Stadium: Stadio Marc'Antonio Bentegodi; Attendance: 9,523; Referee: Emidio Morganti

23 January 2005 20	Fiorentina	1–2	Roma	Florence
20:30 CET (UTC+01:00)	Miccoli (yellow card) 16'; Piangerelli (yellow card) 18'; Maresca 20'; Ariatti (yellow card) 24'; Viali (yellow card) 90+4'	Report	Cassano 23'; Dacourt (yellow card) 33'; Montella 67'	Stadium: Stadio Artemio Franchi; Attendance: 33,788; Referee: Nicola Ayroldi

30 January 2005 21	Roma	3–2	Messina	Rome
15:00 CET (UTC+01:00)	Dellas (yellow card) 23'; Totti 56', (yellow card) 71'; Dacourt (yellow card) 59'; Cassano 60'; De Rossi (yellow card) 66'; Mancini 82', (yellow card) 84'	Report	Zampagna 12'; Parisi 31', (yellow card) 46'; Zoro (yellow card) 38'; Aronica (yellow card) 52'; Iliev (yellow card) 81'	Stadium: Stadio Olimpico; Attendance: 45,328; Referee: Tiziano Pieri

2 February 2005 22	Lecce	1–1	Roma	Lecce
20:30 CET (UTC+01:00)	Stovini (yellow card) 19'; Cassetti (yellow card) 68'; Ledesma (red card) 69'; Vučinić 79'; Giacomazzi (yellow card) 80'; Valdés (yellow card) 90+2'	Report	De Rossi (yellow card) 47'; Giacomazzi 49' (o.g.); Ferrari (yellow card) 75'	Stadium: Stadio Via del Mare; Attendance: 13,402; Referee: Matteo Trefoloni

6 February 2005 23	Roma	1–1	Bologna	Rome
15:00 CET (UTC+01:00)	Montella 9'; Dacourt (yellow card) 26'; Mexès (yellow card) 30'; De Rossi (yellow card) 77'	Report	Zagorakis (yellow card) 52'; Giunti (yellow card) 56'; Della Rocca 62'; Juárez (yellow card) 85'	Stadium: Stadio Olimpico; Attendance: 43,167; Referee: Antonio Dattilo

12 February 2005 24	Internazionale	2–0	Roma	Milan
20:30 CET (UTC+01:00)	Mihajlović 23', 90+2'; Cambiasso (yellow card) 49'; Córdoba (yellow card) 65'; C. Zanetti (yellow card) 72'	Report	Perrotta (yellow card) 17'; Mexès (yellow card) 81' (yellow-red card) 90+1'; Cassano (yellow card) 85'	Stadium: San Siro; Attendance: 61,116; Referee: Matteo Trefoloni

20 February 2005 25	Roma	3–0	Livorno	Rome
15:00 CET (UTC+01:00)	Montella 8'; Totti (yellow card) 38', (goal) 85'; Ferrari (yellow card) 43'; Perrotta 70', (yellow card) 71'	Report	Protti (yellow card) 2'; Galante (yellow card) 55'; Pfertzel (yellow card) 70'	Stadium: Stadio Olimpico; Attendance: 44,251; Referee: Marco Gabriele

27 February 2005 26	Palermo	2–0	Roma	Palermo
15:00 CET (UTC+01:00)	Corini (yellow card) 18'; Brienza 54'; Barone (yellow card) 62' (yellow-red card) 73'; Toni 90+1', (yellow card) 90+2'	Report	Panucci (yellow card) 29'; Cufré (yellow card) 34'; Dellas (yellow card) 42'; Perrotta (yellow card) 89'	Stadium: Stadio Renzo Barbera; Attendance: 33,459; Referee: Roberto Rosetti

5 March 2005 27	Roma	1–2	Juventus	Rome
20:30 CET (UTC+01:00)	Totti (yellow card) 22'; Dacourt (yellow card) 30'; Cassano 39', (yellow card) 40'; Mancini (yellow card) 83'; Montella (yellow card) 87'	Report	Cannavaro 11'; Zebina (yellow card) 23'; Del Piero 44' (pen.), (yellow card) 50'; Blasi (yellow card) 46'; Zalayeta (yellow card) 74'; Camoranesi (yellow card) 76'	Stadium: Stadio Olimpico; Attendance: 69,488; Referee: Salvatore Racalbuto

13 March 2005 28	Cagliari	3–0	Roma	Cagliari
15:00 CET (UTC+01:00)	Zola 24'; Conti (yellow card) 32'; Esposito 41', (yellow card) 52'; Suazo 48'; Bega (yellow card) 51'; Álvarez (yellow card) 83'	Report	Ferrari (yellow card) 21'; Dellas (yellow card) 44'; De Rossi (red card) 58'	Stadium: Stadio Sant'Elia; Attendance: 20,000; Referee: Pierluigi Collina

20 March 2005 29	Roma	0–2	Milan	Rome
20:30 CET (UTC+01:00)	Scurto (yellow card) 65'; Panucci (red card) 70'; Perrotta (yellow card) 73'; Totti (yellow card) 86' (red card) 90+1'	Report	Stam (yellow card) 25'; Cafu (yellow card) 49'; Crespo 63'; Tomasson (yellow card) 66'; Pirlo 71' (pen.); Seedorf (yellow card) 75'; Kaká (yellow card) 84'	Stadium: Stadio Olimpico; Attendance: 59,496; Referee: Gianluca Paparesta

10 April 2005 30	Udinese	3–3	Roma	Udine
15:00 CEST (UTC+02:00)	Di Natale 28'; Pinzi 33'; Di Michele 76', (yellow card) 90+5'	Report	Chivu 14'; Montella 23', (yellow card) 24'; Dacourt (yellow card) 27'; Mancini 44'	Stadium: Stadio Friuli; Attendance: 14,506; Referee: Paolo Bertini

16 April 2005 31	Roma	1–2	Reggina	Rome
20:30 CEST (UTC+02:00)	Chivu 23'	Report	Franceschini (yellow card) 11', (goal) 72'; Colucci (yellow card) 62'; Bonazzoli 82'; Borriello (yellow card) 84'	Stadium: Stadio Olimpico; Attendance: 41,000; Referee: Nicola Rizzoli

20 April 2005 32	Roma	0–2	Siena	Rome
20:30 CEST (UTC+02:00)	Panucci (yellow card) 16'; Totti (yellow card) 61' (red card) 64'; Mexès (yellow card) 85'	Report	Alberto (yellow card) 16'; Maccarone 60'; Tudor (yellow card) 62'; Colonnese (yellow card) 68'; Manninger (yellow card) 75'; Chiesa 88'	Stadium: Stadio Olimpico; Attendance: 40,069; Referee: Paolo Dondarini

24 April 2005 33	Sampdoria	2–1	Roma	Genoa
15:00 CEST (UTC+02:00)	Tonetto 33', (yellow card) 81'; Palombo (yellow card) 39'; Flachi 79' (pen.)	Report	Cufré (yellow card) 78'; Chivu (yellow card) 86'; Montella 90+3' (pen.)	Stadium: Stadio Luigi Ferraris; Attendance: 23,969; Referee: Gianluca Paparesta

1 May 2005 34	Roma	2–2	Brescia	Rome
15:00 CEST (UTC+02:00)	Perrotta 1', (yellow card) 70'; Dacourt (yellow card) 59'; De Rossi 76', (yellow card) 77'	Report	Mareco (yellow card) 18'; Womé 49'; Milanetto (yellow card) 53'; Schopp (yellow card) 56'; Caracciolo 79'; Castellazzi (yellow card) 82'; Domizzi (yellow card) 87'	Stadium: Stadio Olimpico; Attendance: 45,929; Referee: Daniele Tombolini

8 May 2005 35	Parma	2–1	Roma	Parma
15:00 CEST (UTC+02:00)	Simplício (yellow card) 14'; Morfeo 63', (yellow card) 71'; Vignaroli (yellow card) 65'; Gilardino 79' (pen.); Contini (yellow card) 90+1'; Olive (yellow card) 90+4'	Report	Cassano 5', (yellow card) 5'; Virga (yellow card) 37'; Ferrari (yellow card) 62'	Stadium: Stadio Ennio Tardini; Attendance: 13,614; Referee: Matteo Trefoloni

15 May 2005 36	Roma	0–0	Lazio	Rome
15:00 CEST (UTC+02:00)	Panucci (yellow card) 22'; Dacourt (yellow card) 43'; De Rossi (yellow card) 84'	Report	Dabo (yellow card) 38'; A. Filippini (yellow card) 57'; Liverani (yellow card) 61'	Stadium: Stadio Olimpico; Attendance: 64,396; Referee: Pierluigi Collina

22 May 2005 37	Atalanta	0–1	Roma	Bergamo
15:00 CEST (UTC+02:00)		Report	Ferrari (yellow card) 22'; Cassano 50', (yellow card) 50'; De Rossi (yellow card) 57'	Stadium: Stadio Atleti Azzurri d'Italia; Attendance: 21,612; Referee: Paolo Bertini

29 May 2005 38	Roma	0–0	Chievo	Rome
15:00 CEST (UTC+02:00)	Scurto (yellow card) 16'	Report	D'Anna (yellow card) 7'; Moro (yellow card) 69'	Stadium: Stadio Olimpico; Attendance: 55,386; Referee: Emidio Morganti

=== Coppa Italia ===
==== Round of 16 ====
19 November 2004 First leg	Roma	1–2	Siena	Rome
17:00 CET (UTC+01:00)	Totti 57'		Flo 37', 86'	Stadium: Stadio Olimpico; Referee: Andrea De Marco

13 January 2005 Second leg	Siena	1–5 (3–6 agg.)	Roma	Siena
17:30 CET (UTC+01:00)	Maccarone 45' (pen.)		Dellas 12'; Totti 35'; Cassano 46'; Montella 49'; Corvia 65'	Stadium: Stadio Artemio Franchi – Montepaschi Arena; Referee: Emidio Morganti

==== Quarter-finals ====
26 January 2005 First leg	Roma	1–0	Fiorentina	Rome
18:00 CET (UTC+01:00)	De Rossi 40'			Stadium: Stadio Olimpico; Referee: Danilo Nucini

16 March 2005 Second leg	Fiorentina	1–0 (a.e.t.) (1–1 agg.) (6–7 p)	Roma	Florence
17:30 CET (UTC+01:00)	Ferrari 12' (o.g.)			Stadium: Stadio Artemio Franchi; Referee: Massimiliano Saccani
	Penalties
	Jørgensen (penalty scored); Fantini (penalty scored); Riganò (penalty scored); Cejas (penalty scored); Miccoli (penalty missed); Chiellini (penalty scored); Donadel (penalty scored); Ujfaluši (penalty missed)		(penalty missed) Cassano; (penalty scored) Aquilani; (penalty scored) Chivu; (penalty scored) Dellas; (penalty scored) Totti; (penalty scored) Cufré; (penalty scored) Perrotta; (penalty scored) Curto

==== Semi-finals ====
11 May 2005 First leg	Roma	1–1	Udinese	Rome
21:00 CEST (UTC+02:00)	Mexès 36'		Bertotto 84'	Stadium: Stadio Olimpico; Referee: Domenico Messina

19 May 2005 Second leg	Udinese	1–2 (2–3 agg.)	Roma	Udine
21:00 CEST (UTC+02:00)	Di Natale 57'		Mancini 21'; Totti 81'	Stadium: Stadio Friuli; Referee: Domenico Messina

==== Final ====
12 June 2005 First leg	Roma	0–2	Internazionale	Rome
21:30 CEST (UTC+02:00)			Adriano 30', 36'	Stadium: Stadio Olimpico; Attendance: 73,437; Referee: Pierluigi Collina

15 June 2005 Second leg	Internazionale	1–0 (3–0 agg.)	Roma	Milan
20:45 CEST (UTC+02:00)	Mihajlović 52'			Stadium: San Siro; Attendance: 72,034; Referee: Matteo Trefoloni

=== UEFA Champions League ===
==== Group stage ====
Pos	Team	Pld	W	D	L	GF	GA	GD	Pts	Qualification
1	(Germany) Bayer Leverkusen	6	3	2	1	13	7	+6	11	Advance to knockout stage
2	(Spain) Real Madrid	6	3	2	1	11	8	+3	11	Advance to knockout stage
3	(Ukraine) Dynamo Kyiv	6	3	1	2	11	8	+3	10	Transfer to UEFA Cup
4	(Italy) Roma	6	0	1	5	4	16	−12	1	

15 September 2004 1	Roma (Italy)	0–3 (awarded)	(Ukraine) Dynamo Kyiv	Rome, Italy
20:45 CEST (UTC+02:00)	Totti (yellow card) 45'; Mexès (red card) 45+3'	Report	Gavrančić 29'; Verpakovskis (yellow card) 31'	Stadium: Stadio Olimpico; Referee: Anders Frisk (Sweden)
Note: With Dynamo Kyiv leading 1–0, the match was abandoned at half-time after referee Anders Frisk was hit by an object thrown from the crowd. UEFA awarded Dynamo Kyiv a 3–0 win and ordered Roma to play their next two European games behind closed doors.

28 September 2004 2	Real Madrid (Spain)	4–2	(Italy) Roma	Madrid, Spain
20:45 CEST (UTC+02:00)	Raúl 39', 72'; Celades (yellow card) 45'; Helguera (yellow card) 49'; Figo 53'; Roberto Carlos 79'; Samuel (yellow card) 86'	Report	De Rossi 3'; Cassano 21'; Panucci (yellow card) 52'	Stadium: Santiago Bernabéu; Attendance: 60,000; Referee: Valentin Ivanov (Russia)

19 October 2004 3	Bayer Leverkusen (Germany)	3–1	(Italy) Roma	Leverkusen, Germany
20:45 CEST (UTC+02:00)	Robson Ponte (yellow card) 40'; Schneider (yellow card) 43'; Roque Júnior 48'; Krzynówek 59'; Freier (yellow card) 84'; França 90+4'	Report	Berbatov 26' (o.g.); Perrotta (yellow card) 31'; Zotti (yellow card) 44'; Mancini (yellow card) 48'; Panucci (red card) 61'; Aquilani (yellow card) 83'; De Rossi (red card) 87'	Stadium: BayArena; Attendance: 22,500; Referee: Éric Poulat (France)

3 November 2004 4	Roma (Italy)	1–1	(Germany) Bayer Leverkusen	Rome, Italy
20:45 CET (UTC+01:00)	Montella (yellow card) 35', (goal) 90+3'; Mexès (yellow card) 68'; Totti (yellow card) 72'	Report	Balitsch (yellow card) 3'; Placente (yellow card) 56'; Ramelow (yellow card) 72'; Berbatov 82'; Robson Ponte (yellow card) 85'; Freier (yellow card) 90+5'	Stadium: Stadio Olimpico; Attendance: 0 Referee: Lucílio Batista (Portugal)

23 November 2004 5	Dynamo Kyiv (Ukraine)	2–0	(Italy) Roma	Kyiv, Ukraine
20:45 CET (UTC+01:00)	Husyev (yellow card) 51'; El Kaddouri (yellow card) 59'; Dellas 73' (o.g.); Shatskikh 82'	Report	Scurto (yellow card) 3' (yellow-red card) 76'; Ferrari (yellow card) 61'; Perrotta (yellow card) 75'	Stadium: Valeriy Lobanovskyi Dynamo Stadium; Attendance: 40,000; Referee: Mike Riley (England)

8 December 2004 6	Roma (Italy)	0–3	(Spain) Real Madrid	Rome, Italy
20:45 CET (UTC+01:00)	Dellas (yellow card) 60'; Perrotta (yellow card) 69'	Report	Ronaldo 9'; Figo 60' (pen.), 82'; Zidane (yellow card) 64'	Stadium: Stadio Olimpico; Attendance: 0 Referee: René Temmink (Netherlands)

== Statistics ==
=== Appearances and goals ===
No.	Pos	Nat	Player	Total		Serie A		Coppa		UEFA Champions League	
No.	Pos	Nat	Player	Apps	Goals	Apps	Goals	Apps	Goals	Apps	Goals
22	GK	(Italy) ITA	Ivan Pelizzoli	21	-40	17	-30	0	-0	4	-10
2	DF	(Italy) ITA	Christian Panucci	33	0	25+1	0	4	0	3	0
5	DF	(France) FRA	Philippe Mexès	37	1	24+4	0	6	1	3	0
8	DF	(Italy) ITA	Matteo Ferrari	46	0	34+1	0	7	0	4	0
25	DF	(Argentina) ARG	Leandro Cufré	46	0	33	0	7	0	6	0
20	MF	(Italy) ITA	Simone Perrotta	39	3	28+2	3	5	0	4	0
4	MF	(Italy) ITA	Daniele De Rossi	38	4	30	2	5	1	3	1
30	MF	(Brazil) BRA	Mancini	45	6	26+8	4	6	1	5	1
9	FW	(Italy) ITA	Vincenzo Montella	46	23	34+3	21	6	1	3	1
10	FW	(Italy) ITA	Francesco Totti	40	15	29	12	7	3	4	0
18	FW	(Italy) ITA	Antonio Cassano	42	11	30+1	9	8	1	3	1
1	GK	(Italy) ITA	Gianluca Curci	17	-24	11	-16	6	-8	0	-0
15	MF	(France) FRA	Olivier Dacourt	28	0	20+3	0	3	0	2	0
31	DF	(Greece) GRE	Traianos Dellas	27	2	19+1	1	3	1	4	0
23	MF	(Italy) ITA	Alberto Aquilani	38	0	14+15	0	4	0	5	0
13	DF	(Romania) ROU	Cristian Chivu	15	2	10	2	4	0	1	0
12	GK	(Italy) ITA	Carlo Zotti	14	-17	10	-12	2	-1	2	-4
19	DF	(Italy) ITA	Giuseppe Scurto	16	0	4+5	0	5	0	2	0
11	FW	(Italy) ITA	Daniele Corvia	20	1	2+11	0	4	1	3	0
28	MF	(Italy) ITA	Valerio Virga	9	0	2+4	0	3	0		
3	DF	(Portugal) POR	Abel Xavier	4	0	2+1	0	1	0		
25	FW	(Italy) ITA	Alessio Cerci	2	0	0+2	0				
29	MF	(Italy) ITA	Leandro Greco	4	0	0+1	0	3	0		
28	DF	(Italy) ITA	Aleandro Rosi	2	0	0+1	0	1	0		
17	MF	(Italy) ITA	Damiano Tommasi	0	0	0	0				
99	FW	(Egypt) EGY	Mido	13	0	0+8	0	1	0	4	0
	MF	(Italy) ITA	A. Briotti	1	0	0+1	0				
	MF	(Italy) ITA	R. De Martino	9	0	0+5	0	2	0	2	0
	DF	(Italy) ITA	M. Marsili	1	0	1	0				
Players transferred out during the season
7	DF	(Italy) ITA	Luigi Sartor	12	0	5+2	0	1	0	4	0
32	DF	(France) FRA	Vincent Candela	12	0	4+4	0	1	0	3	0
21	MF	(Italy) ITA	Gaetano D'Agostino	11	0	3+3	0	3	0	2	0
24	FW	(Italy) ITA	Marco Delvecchio	5	0	2+2	0	0	0	1	0

Source: http://calcio-seriea.net/presenze/2004/1266/

=== Goalscorers ===
Rank	No.	Pos	Nat	Name	Serie A	Coppa Italia	UEFA CL	Total
1	9	FW	(Italy)	Vincenzo Montella	21	1	1	23
2	10	FW	(Italy)	Francesco Totti	12	3	0	15
3	18	FW	(Italy)	Antonio Cassano	9	1	1	11
4	30	MF	(Brazil)	Mancini	4	1	0	5
5	16	MF	(Italy)	Daniele De Rossi	2	1	1	4
6	20	MF	(Italy)	Simone Perrotta	3	0	0	3
7	13	DF	(Romania)	Cristian Chivu	2	0	0	2
7	31	DF	(Greece)	Traianos Dellas	1	1	0	2
9	5	DF	(France)	Philippe Mexès	0	1	0	1
9	11	FW	(Italy)	Daniele Corvia	0	1	0	1
Own goal					1	0	1	2
Totals					55	10	4	69

Last updated: 15 June 2005

=== Clean sheets ===
Rank	No.	Pos	Nat	Name	Serie A	Coppa Italia	UEFA CL	Total
1	1	GK	(Italy)	Gianluca Curci	3	0	0	3
1	12	GK	(Italy)	Carlo Zotti	2	1	0	3
1	22	GK	(Italy)	Ivan Pelizzoli	3	0	0	3
Totals					8	1	0	9

Last updated: 15 June 2005
