= 2005–06 AS Roma season =

Roma
2005–06 season
- President: Franco Sensi
- Manager: Luciano Spalletti
- Stadium: Stadio Olimpico
- Serie A: 2nd (originally 5th)
- Coppa Italia: Runners-up
- UEFA Cup: Round of 16
- Top goalscorer: League: Francesco Totti (15); All: Mancini (18)
- Average home league attendance: 41,933
Home colours	Away colours	Third colours

The 2005–06 season saw Associazione Sportiva Roma experience several ups and downs, as it went through periods of poor form which bracketed a then-record 11 match winning streak in Serie A. Despite this period of excellent form, the club originally finished just fifth in the final standings, before Juventus, Milan and Fiorentina all were declared of varying guilt in a scandal that rocked Italian football in the summer of 2006. The resulting point deductions directed toward all three aforementioned clubs promoted Roma to second in the final standings.

The season also saw Roma hit with a one-year transfer ban, since it poached Philippe Mexès from Auxerre in spite of a rolling contract in 2004. Before the axe fell, Roma had already made its summer signings Doni, Samuel Kuffour, Rodrigo Taddei and Shabani Nonda, which made the ban redundant. It did however, delay Antonio Cassano's long-awaited transfer to Real Madrid, which lifted the morale of the squad following Cassano's long-time public feud with captain Francesco Totti.

== Players ==
=== Squad information ===
Last updated on 14 May 2006
Appearances include league matches only

No.	Name	Nat	Position(s)	Date of birth (Age at end of season)	Signed from	Signed in	Apps.	Goals
Goalkeepers
1	Gianluca Curci	(Italy)	GK	12 July 1985 (aged 20)	(Italy) Youth Sector	2004	21	0
21	Dimitrios Eleftheropoulos	(Greece)	GK	7 August 1976 (aged 29)	(Italy) Milan	2006	0	0
32	Doni	(Brazil)	GK	22 October 1979 (aged 26)	(Brazil) Juventude	2005	28	0
Defenders
2	Christian Panucci (Vice-Captain)	(Italy)	RB / CB	12 April 1973 (aged 33)	(France) Monaco	2001	146	7
3	Cesare Bovo	(Italy)	CB	14 January 1983 (aged 23)	(Italy) Lecce	2004	22	0
4	Samuel Kuffour	(Ghana)	CB	3 September 1976 (aged 29)	(Germany) Bayern Munich	2005	21	0
5	Philippe Mexès	(France)	CB	30 March 1982 (aged 24)	(France) Auxerre	2004	55	3
13	Cristian Chivu	(Romania)	LB / CB	26 October 1980 (aged 25)	(Netherlands) Ajax	2003	59	6
24	Luigi Sartor	(Italy)	LB / RB / CB	30 January 1975 (aged 31)	(Italy) Parma	2002	19	0
25	Leandro Cufré	(Argentina)	LB	9 May 1978 (aged 28)	(Argentina) Gimnasia La Plata	2002	69	1
28	Aleandro Rosi	(Italy)	RB	17 May 1987 (aged 19)	(Italy) Youth Sector	2004	18	0
Midfielders
7	Édgar Álvarez	(Honduras)	RM	9 January 1980 (aged 26)	(Uruguay) Peñarol	2005	20	0
8	Alberto Aquilani	(Italy)	CM / AM	7 July 1984 (aged 21)	(Italy) Youth Sector	2002	54	3
11	Rodrigo Taddei	(Brazil)	LM / RM / AM	6 March 1980 (aged 26)	(Italy) Siena	2005	38	8
14	Houssine Kharja	(Morocco)	AM / CM	9 November 1982 (aged 23)	(Italy) Ternana	2005	28	1
15	Olivier Dacourt	(France)	AM / CM	25 September 1974 (aged 31)	(England) Leeds United	2003	94	2
16	Daniele De Rossi	(Italy)	DM / CM	24 July 1983 (aged 22)	(Italy) Youth Sector	2001	85	10
17	Damiano Tommasi	(Italy)	DM / CM	17 May 1974 (aged 32)	(Italy) Hellas Verona	1996	263	14
20	Simone Perrotta	(Italy)	LM / CM / AM	17 September 1977 (aged 28)	(Italy) Chievo	2004	65	8
29	Leandro Greco	(Italy)	CM	19 July 1986 (aged 19)	(Italy) Youth Sector	2003	2	0
30	Mancini	(Brazil)	LW / RW / AM	1 August 1980 (aged 25)	(Italy) Venezia	2003	94	24
Forwards
9	Vincenzo Montella	(Italy)	CF / ST	18 June 1974 (aged 32)	(Italy) Sampdoria	1999	168	80
10	Francesco Totti (Captain)	(Italy)	AM / LW / SS / CF / ST	27 September 1976 (aged 29)	(Italy) Youth Sector	1992	325	113
26	Alessio Cerci	(Italy)	RW / SS	23 July 1987 (aged 18)	(Italy) Youth Sector	2003	4	0
35	Stefano Okaka	(Italy)	CF / ST	9 August 1989 (aged 16)	(Italy) Youth Sector	2005	8	0
40	Shabani Nonda	(Democratic Republic of the Congo)	CF / ST	6 March 1977 (aged 29)	(France) Monaco	2005	15	4
Players transferred during the season
18	Antonio Cassano	(Italy)	ST / SS	12 July 1982 (aged 23)	(Italy) Bari	2001	118	39

=== Transfers ===
In
Pos.	Name	from	Type
GK	Doni	Juventude	(€18 000)
DF	Samuel Kuffour	Bayern Munich	free
MF	Rodrigo Taddei	Siena	free
FW	Shabani Nonda	AS Monaco	free
GK	Dimitrios Eleftheropoulos	Messina	free
DF	Gianluca Comotto	Torino	free
DF	Cesare Bovo	Lecce	
MF	Houssine Kharja	Ternana	loan
MF	Edgar Álvarez	Peñarol	loan

Out
Pos.	Name	To	Type
DF	Luigi Sartor	Sopron	
DF	Andrea Briotti	SSC Napoli	
DF	Giuseppe Scurto	Chievo Verona	
FW	Alessandro Simonetta	Arezzo	
DF	Saliou Lassissi	AS Nancy	end of contract
DF	Traianos Dellas	AEK Athens	end of contract
DF	Abel Xavier	Middlesbrough FC	end of contract
GK	Ivan Pelizzoli	Reggina	loan
FW	Daniele Corvia	Ternana	loan
DF	Matteo Ferrari	Everton FC	loan
DF	Gianluca Comotto	Ascoli	loan
GK	Carlo Zotti	Ascoli	loan
DF	Gianluca Galasso	Ternana	loan
MF	Valerio Virga	Palermo	loan

==== Winter ====
In
Pos.	Name	To	Type

Out
Pos.	Name	To	Type
FW	Antonio Cassano	Real Madrid	(€5,5 million)
MF	Adewale Wahab	Teramo	loan
DF	Simone Piva	Giulianova	

== Competitions ==
=== Overall ===
Competition	Started round	Final position	First match	Last match
Serie A	Matchday 1	Runners-up	28 August 2005	14 May 2006
Coppa Italia	Round of 16	Runners-up	8 December 2005	11 May 2006
UEFA Cup	First round	Round of 16	15 September 2005	15 March 2006

Last updated: 14 May 2006

=== Serie A ===
==== League table ====
Pos	Team	Pld	W	D	L	GF	GA	GD	Pts	Qualification or relegation
1	Inter Milan (C)	38	23	7	8	68	30	+38	76	Qualification to Champions League group stage
2	Roma	38	19	12	7	70	42	+28	69	Qualification to Champions League group stage
3	Milan (Note: Milan, Fiorentina and Lazio were docked 30 points, all for involvement in the Calciopoli.)	38	28	4	6	85	31	+54	58	Qualification to Champions League third qualifying round
4	Chievo	38	13	15	10	54	49	+5	54	Qualification to Champions League third qualifying round
5	Palermo	38	13	13	12	50	52	−2	52	Qualification to UEFA Cup first round

Source: 2005–06 Serie A, Soccerway
Rules for classification: 1) points; 2) goal difference; 3) number of goals scored.
(C) Champions

==== Results summary ====
Overall								Home						Away					
Pld	W	D	L	GF	GA	GD	Pts	W	D	L	GF	GA	GD	W	D	L	GF	GA	GD
38	19	12	7	70	42	+28	69	11	4	4	35	21	+14	8	8	3	35	21	+14

Last updated: 14 May 2006.
Source: Competitive matches

==== Results by round ====
Round	1	2	3	4	5	6	7	8	9	10	11	12	13	14	15	16	17	18	19	20	21	22	23	24	25	26	27	28	29	30	31	32	33	34	35	36	37	38
Ground	A	H	A	H	A	H	A	H	A	H	A	H	H	A	H	A	H	A	H	H	A	H	A	H	A	H	A	H	A	H	A	A	H	A	H	A	H	A
Result	W	L	D	W	D	L	L	D	W	W	W	L	D	D	L	D	W	W	W	W	W	W	W	W	W	W	W	D	L	W	D	D	W	D	D	D	W	L
Position	2	9	10	7	10	12	14	14	12	8	6	8	9	9	10	10	8	7	6	6	6	5	5	5	5	4	4	5	5	5	5	5	4	5	5	5	5	2

Source: Competitive matches
A = Away; H = Home; W = Win; D = Draw; L = Loss; = Leader, UEFA Champions League Groups stage; = UEFA Champions League Groups stage; = UEFA Champions League Qualifying round; = 2006–07 UEFA Cup; = 2006–07 Serie B

==== Matches ====
28 August 2005 1	Reggina	0–3	Roma	Reggio Calabria
15:00 CEST (UTC+02:00)	Paredes (red card) 64'	Report	Mancini 30'; De Rossi 46'; Nonda 90+3'	Stadium: Stadio Oreste Granillo; Attendance: 14,000; Referee: Roberto Rosetti

11 September 2005 2	Roma	0–1	Udinese	Rome
15:00 CEST (UTC+02:00)		Report	Natali (yellow card) 27'; Muntari 32'; Vidigal (yellow card) 57'; De Sanctis (yellow card) 65'; Juárez (yellow card) 84'	Stadium: Stadio Olimpico; Attendance: 36,000; Referee: Domenico Messina

18 September 2005 3	Livorno	0–0	Roma	Livorno
20:30 CEST (UTC+02:00)	De Ascentis (yellow card) 12'; Colucci (yellow card) 82'	Report	Taddei (yellow card) 22'; Totti (yellow card) 83'	Stadium: Stadio Armando Picchi; Attendance: 13,736; Referee: Matteo Trefoloni

21 September 2005 4	Roma	4–1	Parma	Rome
20:30 CEST (UTC+02:00)	Totti 24'; Nonda 26', 87'; Panucci 34'	Report	Cannavaro 30'	Stadium: Stadio Olimpico; Attendance: 35,542; Referee: Daniele Tombolini

25 September 2005 5	Cagliari	0–0	Roma	Cagliari
15:00 CEST (UTC+02:00)		Report		Stadium: Stadio Sant'Elia; Attendance: 12,550; Referee: Antonio Dattilo

2 October 2005 6	Roma	2–3	Siena	Rome
15:00 CEST (UTC+02:00)	Taddei 46'; Panucci 86'	Report	Negro 17'; Chiesa 54'; Colonnese 90'	Stadium: Stadio Olimpico; Attendance: 33,508; Referee: Emidio Morganti

16 October 2005 7	Empoli	1–0	Roma	Empoli
15:00 CEST (UTC+02:00)	Tavano 59'	Report		Stadium: Stadio Carlo Castellani; Attendance: 8,607; Referee: Tiziano Pieri

23 October 2005 8	Roma	1–1	Lazio	Rome
20:30 CEST (UTC+02:00)	Totti 40'	Report	Rocchi 57'	Stadium: Stadio Olimpico; Attendance: 61,030; Referee: Gianluca Paparesta

26 October 2005 9	Internazionale	2–3	Roma	Milan
20:30 CEST (UTC+02:00)	Adriano 67', 77'	Report	Montella 12'; Totti 30', 47' (pen.)	Stadium: San Siro; Attendance: 50,230; Referee: Roberto Rosetti

30 October 2005 10	Roma	2–1	Ascoli	Rome
15:00 CET (UTC+01:00)	Panucci 39'; Mexès 90+1'	Report	Domizzi 83'	Stadium: Stadio Olimpico; Attendance: 38,722; Referee: Nicola Rizzoli

6 November 2005 11	Messina	0–2	Roma	Messina
15:00 CET (UTC+01:00)		Report	Mexès 34'; Totti 81'	Stadium: Stadio San Filippo; Attendance: 21,366; Referee: Paolo Dondarini

19 November 2005 12	Roma	1–4	Juventus	Rome
20:30 CET (UTC+01:00)	Totti 65' (pen.)	Report	Nedvěd 45+1'; Ibrahimović 56'; Trezeguet 58', 61'	Stadium: Stadio Olimpico; Attendance: 68,816; Referee: Gianluca Paparesta

27 November 2005 13	Roma	1–1	Fiorentina	Rome
20:30 CET (UTC+01:00)	Tommasi 2'	Report	Toni 67' (pen.)	Stadium: Stadio Olimpico; Attendance: 39,690; Referee: Nicola Ayroldi

4 December 2005 14	Lecce	2–2	Roma	Lecce
20:35 CET (UTC+01:00)	Cozzolino 51'; Vučinić 57' (pen.)	Report	Cassano 21'; Nonda 45'	Stadium: Stadio Via del Mare; Attendance: 14,781; Referee: Nicola Rizzoli

11 December 2005 15	Roma	1–2	Palermo	Rome
15:00 CET (UTC+01:00)	Cassano 35'	Report	Biava 21'; Caracciolo 78'	Stadium: Stadio Olimpico; Attendance: 35,316; Referee: Paolo Bertini

18 December 2005 16	Sampdoria	1–1	Roma	Genoa
20:30 CET (UTC+01:00)	Flachi 56' (pen.)	Report	Totti 15'	Stadium: Stadio Luigi Ferraris; Attendance: 22,551; Referee: Gianluca Rocchi

21 December 2005 17	Roma	4–0	Chievo	Rome
20:30 CET (UTC+01:00)	Totti 32' (pen.), 39'; Perrotta 64'; Taddei 85'	Report		Stadium: Stadio Olimpico; Attendance: 32,068; Referee: Daniele Tombolini

8 January 2006 18	Treviso	0–1	Roma	Treviso
15:00 CET (UTC+01:00)		Report	Aquilani 34'	Stadium: Stadio Omobono Tenni; Attendance: 7,562; Referee: Salvatore Racalbuto

15 January 2006 19	Roma	1–0	Milan	Rome
20:30 CET (UTC+01:00)	Mancini 81'	Report		Stadium: Stadio Olimpico; Attendance: 48,952; Referee: Roberto Rosetti

18 January 2006 20	Roma	3–1	Reggina	Rome
20:30 CET (UTC+01:00)	Totti 4', 65'; Mancini 90+3'	Report	Franceschini 90+1'	Stadium: Stadio Olimpico; Attendance: 32,734; Referee: Paolo Tagliavento

22 January 2006 21	Udinese	1–4	Roma	Udine
15:00 CET (UTC+01:00)	Di Natale 66'	Report	Mancini 40' (pen.), 75'; De Rossi 62'; Chivu 79' (pen.)	Stadium: Stadio Friuli; Attendance: 16,524; Referee: Nicola Ayroldi

29 January 2006 22	Roma	3–0	Livorno	Rome
15:00 CET (UTC+01:00)	Totti 31', 41' (pen.); Taddei 62'	Report		Stadium: Stadio Olimpico; Attendance: 36,831; Referee: Domenico Messina

4 February 2006 23	Parma	0–3	Roma	Parma
20:30 CET (UTC+01:00)		Report	Mancini 48', 72'; Perrotta 76'	Stadium: Stadio Ennio Tardini; Attendance: 16,638; Referee: Matteo Trefoloni

8 February 2006 24	Roma	4–3	Cagliari	Rieti
20:30 CET (UTC+01:00)	Perrotta 25'; De Rossi 35'; Totti 79' (pen.), 90+1' (pen.)	Report	Suazo 15'; Langella 19'; Conti 55'	Stadium: Stadio Centro d'Italia - Manlio Scopigno; Attendance: 0 Referee: Oscar Girardi

12 February 2006 25	Siena	0–2	Roma	Siena
15:00 CET (UTC+01:00)		Report	De Rossi 71'; Mancini 90+4'	Stadium: Stadio Artemio Franchi – Montepaschi Arena; Attendance: 12,315; Referee: Nicola Ayroldi

19 February 2006 26	Roma	1–0	Empoli	Rome
15:00 CET (UTC+01:00)	Perrotta 15'	Report		Stadium: Stadio Olimpico; Attendance: 43,503; Referee: Domenico Messina

26 February 2006 27	Lazio	0–2	Roma	Rome
20:30 CET (UTC+01:00)		Report	Taddei 31'; Aquilani 63'	Stadium: Stadio Olimpico; Attendance: 60,040; Referee: Matteo Trefoloni

5 March 2006 28	Roma	1–1	Internazionale	Rome
20:30 CET (UTC+01:00)	Taddei 9'	Report	Materazzi 89'	Stadium: Stadio Olimpico; Attendance: 56,819; Referee: Tiziano Pieri

12 March 2006 29	Ascoli	3–2	Roma	Ascoli Piceno
15:00 CET (UTC+01:00)	Quagliarella 20'; Paci 24'; Budan 42'	Report	Taddei 72'; Comotto 74' (o.g.)	Stadium: Stadio Cino e Lillo Del Duca; Attendance: 17,498; Referee: Paolo Bertini

19 March 2006 30	Roma	2–1	Messina	Rome
20:30 CET (UTC+01:00)	Perrotta 7'; Aquilani 56'	Report	Di Napoli 68'	Stadium: Stadio Olimpico; Attendance: 34,217; Referee: Mauro Bergonzi

25 March 2006 31	Juventus	1–1	Roma	Turin
20:30 CET (UTC+01:00)	Emerson 35'	Report	Kharja 85'	Stadium: Stadio delle Alpi; Attendance: 29,068; Referee: Matteo Trefoloni

2 April 2006 32	Fiorentina	1–1	Roma	Florence
15:00 CEST (UTC+02:00)	Toni 2'	Report	Cufré 72'	Stadium: Stadio Artemio Franchi; Attendance: 40,786; Referee: Domenico Messina

9 April 2006 33	Roma	3–1	Lecce	Rome
15:00 CEST (UTC+02:00)	Mancini 20' (pen.), 73'; Chivu 23'	Report	Delvecchio 90+3'	Stadium: Stadio Olimpico; Attendance: 38,932; Referee: Massimiliano Saccani

15 April 2006 34	Palermo	3–3	Roma	Palermo
15:00 CEST (UTC+02:00)	Di Michele 50'; Barone 52', 79'	Report	Taddei 24'; Mancini 29' (pen.), 31'	Stadium: Stadio Renzo Barbera; Attendance: 27,855; Referee: Roberto Rosetti

22 April 2006 35	Roma	0–0	Sampdoria	Rome
15:00 CEST (UTC+02:00)		Report		Stadium: Stadio Olimpico; Attendance: 39,846; Referee: Emidio Morganti

30 April 2006 36	Chievo	4–4	Roma	Verona
15:00 CEST (UTC+02:00)	Amauri 8', 36'; Luciano 48'; Pellissier 61' (pen.)	Report	De Rossi 4', 14'; Taddei 25'; Dacourt 62'	Stadium: Stadio Marc'Antonio Bentegodi; Attendance: 10,234; Referee: Tiziano Pieri

7 May 2006 37	Roma	1–0	Treviso	Rome
15:00 CEST (UTC+02:00)	Tommasi 36'	Report		Stadium: Stadio Olimpico; Attendance: 42,263; Referee: Roberto Rosetti

14 May 2006 38	Milan	2–1	Roma	Milan
15:00 CEST (UTC+02:00)	Kaká 5' (pen.); Amoroso 90+1' (pen.)	Report	Mexès 34'	Stadium: San Siro; Attendance: 66,305; Referee: Andrea De Marco

=== Coppa Italia ===
==== Round of 16 ====
8 December 2005 First leg	Napoli	0–3	Roma	Naples
15:00 CET (UTC+01:00)			Aquilani 34'; Nonda 40'; Okaka 83'	Stadium: Stadio San Paolo; Referee: Paolo Dondarini

11 January 2006 Second leg	Roma	2–1 (5–1 agg.)	Napoli	Rome
17:00 CET (UTC+01:00)	Aquilani 39'; Mancini 45'		Amodio 90'	Stadium: Stadio Olimpico; Referee: Mauro Bergonzi

==== Quarter-finals ====
26 January 2006 First leg	Juventus	2–3	Roma	Turin
21:00 CET (UTC+01:00)	Del Piero 72', 90'		Mancini 38'; Tommasi 61'; Perrotta 68'	Stadium: Stadio delle Alpi; Referee: Daniele Tombolini

1 February 2006 Second leg	Roma	0–1 (3a–3 agg.)	Juventus	Rome
21:00 CET (UTC+01:00)			Mutu 48'	Stadium: Stadio Olimpico; Referee: Paolo Dondarini

==== Semi-finals ====
22 March 2006 First leg	Palermo	2–1	Roma	Palermo
18:15 CET (UTC+01:00)	Brienza 4'; Mutarelli 69'		Perrotta 1'	Stadium: Stadio Renzo Barbera; Referee: Emidio Morganti

12 April 2006 Second leg	Roma	1–0 (2a–2 agg.)	Palermo	Rome
21:00 CEST (UTC+02:00)	Tommasi 30'			Stadium: Stadio Olimpico; Referee: Salvatore Racalbuto

==== Final ====
3 May 2006 First leg	Roma	1–1	Internazionale	Rome
20:45 CEST (UTC+02:00)	Mancini 55'		Cruz 8'	Stadium: Stadio Olimpico; Attendance: 64,000; Referee: Matteo Trefoloni

11 May 2006 Second leg	Internazionale	3–1 (4–2 agg.)	Roma	Milan
20:45 CEST (UTC+02:00)	Cambiasso 6'; Cruz 45'; Martins 76'		Nonda 80'	Stadium: San Siro; Attendance: 59,000; Referee: Domenico Messina

=== UEFA Cup ===
==== First round ====
15 September 2005 First leg	Roma (Italy)	5–1	(Greece) Aris	Rome, Italy
21:00 CEST (UTC+02:00)	Aquilani 1', (yellow card) 79'; Panucci 22', 43'; Montella 27'; Kuffour (yellow card) 29'; Totti 53'	Report	Domoraud (yellow card) 11'; Sanjurjo 39'; Papadopoulos (yellow card) 60'; Moisiadis (yellow card) 69'	Stadium: Stadio Olimpico; Referee: Pedro Proença (Portugal)

29 September 2005 Second leg	Aris (Greece)	0–0 (1–5 agg.)	(Italy) Roma	Thessaloniki, Greece
21:00 CEST (UTC+02:00)	Vangjeli (yellow card) 67'	Report	Bovo (yellow card) 79'	Stadium: Kleanthis Vikelidis Stadium; Referee: Alon Yefet (Israel)

==== Group stage ====
Pos	Team	Pld	W	D	L	GF	GA	GD	Pts	Qualification	STR	ROM	BSL	RSB	TRO
1	(France) Strasbourg	4	2	2	0	7	3	+4	8	Advance to knockout stage	—	—	—	2–2	2–0
2	(Italy) Roma	4	2	1	1	7	6	+1	7	Advance to knockout stage	1–1	—	3–1	—	—
3	(Switzerland) Basel	4	2	0	2	7	9	−2	6	Advance to knockout stage	0–2	—	—	—	4–3
4	(Serbia and Montenegro) Red Star Belgrade	4	1	1	2	7	8	−1	4		—	3–1	1–2	—	—
5	(Norway) Tromsø	4	1	0	3	7	9	−2	3		—	1–2	—	3–1	—

20 October 2005 1	Tromsø (Norway)	1–2	(Italy) Roma	Tromsø, Norway
20:45 CEST (UTC+02:00)	Årst 42', (yellow card) 86'	Report	Kuffour 35'; Dacourt (yellow card) 45'; Bovo (yellow card) 48'; Cufré 84'; Perrotta (red card) 89'; De Rossi (yellow card) 90'	Stadium: Alfheim Stadion; Referee: Peter Sippel (Germany)

24 November 2005 2	Roma (Italy)	1–1	(France) Strasbourg	Rome, Italy
21:00 CET (UTC+01:00)	Cassano 72'; Bovo (yellow card) 85'	Report	Bellaïd 51'	Stadium: Stadio Olimpico; Referee: Alberto Undiano Mallenco (Spain)

1 December 2005 3	Red Star Belgrade (Serbia and Montenegro)	3–1	(Italy) Roma	Belgrade, Serbia and Montenegro
20:45 CET (UTC+01:00)	Žigić 37', 86'; Kovačević (yellow card) 70'; Purović 77'	Report	Nonda 23'; Álvarez (yellow card) 50'; Aquilani (yellow card) 71'	Stadium: Stadion FK Crvena zvezda Referee: Martin Hansson (Sweden)

14 December 2005 4	Roma (Italy)	3–1	(Switzerland) Basel	Rome, Italy
20:45 CET (UTC+01:00)	Taddei 12'; Totti 45'; Nonda 49'; Chivu (yellow card) 61'	Report	Petrić 78'; Eduardo (yellow card) 81'	Stadium: Stadio Olimpico; Referee: Helmut Fleischer (Germany)

==== Final phase ====
===== Round of 32 =====
15 February 2006 First leg	Club Brugge (Belgium)	1–2	(Italy) Roma	Bruges, Belgium
20:45 CET (UTC+01:00)	Portillo 61'; De Cock (yellow card) 64'; Klukowski (yellow card) 71'	Report	Dacourt (yellow card) 13'; De Rossi (red card) 27'; Vanaudenaerde 44' (o.g.); Curci (yellow card) 72'; Perrotta 74'	Stadium: Jan Breydel Stadium; Attendance: 27,138; Referee: Yuri Baskakov (Russia)

23 February 2006 Second leg	Roma (Italy)	2–1 (4–2 agg.)	(Belgium) Club Brugge	Rome, Italy
21:00 CET (UTC+01:00)	Kharja (yellow card) 16'; Mancini 55'; Tommasi (yellow card) 58'; Bovo 71'	Report	Verheyen 60'; Clement (yellow card) 73'	Stadium: Stadio Olimpico; Referee: Claus Bo Larsen (Denmark)

===== Round of 16 =====
9 March 2006 First leg	Middlesbrough (England)	1–0	(Italy) Roma	Middlesbrough, England
21:00 CET (UTC+01:00)	Yakubu 12' (pen.); Riggott (yellow card) 72'	Report	Perrotta (yellow card) 42'; Mexès (yellow card) 89'	Stadium: Riverside Stadium; Attendance: 25,354; Referee: Alain Sars (France)

15 March 2006 Second leg	Roma (Italy)	2–1 (2–2a agg.)	(England) Middlesbrough	Rome, Italy
21:00 CET (UTC+01:00)	Mexès (yellow card) 30' (yellow-red card) 90+2'; Mancini (yellow card) 31', (goal) 43', 66' (pen.); Aquilani (yellow card) 77'; Bovo (yellow card) 86'	Report	Cattermole (yellow card) 14'; Boateng (yellow card) 30'; Hasselbaink 32'; Pogatetz (yellow card) 85'	Stadium: Stadio Olimpico; Attendance: 32,642; Referee: Tom Henning Øvrebø (Norway)

== Statistics ==
=== Appearances and goals ===
No.	Pos	Nat	Player	Total		Serie A		Coppa Italia		UEFA Cup	
No.	Pos	Nat	Player	Apps	Goals	Apps	Goals	Apps	Goals	Apps	Goals
32	GK	(Brazil) BRA	Doni	33	-5	28	0	3	-4	2	-1
2	DF	(Italy) ITA	Christian Panucci	51	5	36	3	6	0	9	2
5	DF	(France) FRA	Philippe Mexès	43	3	24+3	3	7	0	9	0
25	DF	(Argentina) ARG	Leandro Cufré	42	2	26+3	1	5	0	8	1
13	DF	(Romania) ROU	Cristian Chivu	38	2	27	2	7	0	4	0
16	DM	(Italy) ITA	Daniele De Rossi	45	6	34	6	4	0	7	0
8	DM	(Italy) ITA	Alberto Aquilani	36	6	20+4	3	4	2	8	1
11	MF	(Brazil) BRA	Rodrigo Taddei	53	9	35+3	8	5	0	10	1
20	MF	(Italy) ITA	Simone Perrotta	47	8	35	5	5	2	7	1
30	MF	(Brazil) BRA	Mancini	41	18	24+3	12	7	3	7	3
10	FW	(Italy) ITA	Francesco Totti	28	17	23	15	2	0	3	2
1	GK	(Italy) ITA	Gianluca Curci	23	-29	10	-13	5	-6	8	-10
4	DF	(Ghana) GHA	Samuel Kuffour	30	1	18+2	0	3	0	7	1
3	DF	(Italy) ITA	Cesare Bovo	35	2	16+5	1	7	0	7	1
17	MF	(Italy) ITA	Damiano Tommasi	38	4	12+15	2	8	2	3	0
15	MF	(France) FRA	Olivier Dacourt	38	1	11+15	1	5	0	7	0
9	FW	(Italy) ITA	Vincenzo Montella	15	2	9+3	1	0	0	3	1
28	DF	(Italy) ITA	Aleandro Rosi	24	0	5+10	0	6	0	3	0
40	FW	(Democratic Republic of the Congo) COD	Shabani Nonda	21	7	4+10	3	2	2	5	2
14	MF	(Morocco) MAR	Houssine Kharja	23	1	2+8	1	5	0	8	0
7	MF	(Honduras) HON	Édgar Álvarez	28	0	2+14	0	4	0	8	0
35	FW	(Italy) ITA	Stefano Okaka	15	1	0+6	0	6	1	3	0
21	GK	(Greece) GRE	Dimitrios Eleftheropoulos	0	0	0	0	0	0	0	0
24	DF	(Italy) ITA	Luigi Sartor	0	0	0	0	0	0	0	0
29	MF	(Italy) ITA	Leandro Greco	2	0	0	0	2	0	0	0
26	FW	(Italy) ITA	Alessio Cerci	1	0	0	0	1	0	0	0
	MF	(Italy) ITA	A. Giacomini	1	0	1	0	0	0		
	DF	(Italy) ITA	M. Marsili	0	0	0	0	0	0		
	DF	(Italy) ITA	P. Pipolo	0	0	0	0	0	0		
Players transferred out during the season
18	FW	(Italy) ITA	Antonio Cassano	7	3	4+1	2	0	0	2	1

Last updated: 14 May 2006
Source: http://calcio-seriea.net/presenze/2005/1285/

=== Clean sheets ===
Rank	No.	Pos	Nat	Name	Serie A	Coppa Italia	UEFA Cup	Total
1	32	GK	(Brazil)	Doni	11	1	1	13
2	1	GK	(Italy)	Gianluca Curci	3	1	0	4
Totals					14	2	1	17

Last updated: 14 May 2006
