= 2002–03 AS Roma season =

Roma
2002–03 season
- President: Franco Sensi
- Manager: Fabio Capello
- Stadium: Stadio Olimpico
- Serie A: 8th
- Coppa Italia: Runners-up
- UEFA Champions League: Second group stage
- Top goalscorer: League: Francesco Totti (14); All: Francesco Totti (20)
- Average home league attendance: 57,160
Home colours	Away colours	Third colours

Associazione Sportiva Roma crashed down to earth following its previous two remarkable seasons, where it had won Serie A in 2000–01 and finished a close second in 2001–02. Despite the acquisition of Pep Guardiola as central midfielder, he did not apparently fit into Fabio Capello's first-team plans. The squad was essentially the same as the year before, and Guardiola's absence from the starting XI spoke volumes about the reputation of the Roma players at the time. However, things began to go against Roma following its tense competition in Serie A with Juventus. Suspecting things were amiss, both chairman Franco Sensi and manager Capello publicly condemned the judgements.

Due to all the 'misfortune' with decisions, Roma's season soon descended into complete darkness, the only highlight of the season being the qualification for the Coppa Italia final, which they lost to Milan. In the league, only a strong final third of the season saved eighth place, with only Francesco Totti reaching his normal level.

== Players ==
=== Squad information ===
Last updated on 31 May 2003

Note: Flags indicate national team as defined under FIFA eligibility rules; some limited exceptions apply. Players may hold more than one non-FIFA nationality.

No.	Pos.	Nation	Player
1	GK	ITA	Francesco Antonioli
2	DF	BRA	Cafu
4	DF	ITA	Luigi Sartor
5	DF	FRA	Jonathan Zebina
6	DF	BRA	Aldair
7	MF	ITA	Diego Fuser
8	MF	BRA	Francisco Lima
9	FW	ITA	Vincenzo Montella
10	FW	ITA	Francesco Totti
11	MF	BRA	Emerson
12	GK	ITA	Carlo Zotti
13	DF	ARG	Leandro Cufré
14	FW	SCG	Ivan Tomić
15	MF	FRA	Olivier Dacourt
17	MF	ITA	Damiano Tommasi
18	FW	ITA	Antonio Cassano

No.	Pos.	Nation	Player
19	DF	ARG	Walter Samuel
20	MF	ITA	Davide Bombardini
21	MF	ITA	Alberto Aquilani
22	GK	ITA	Ivan Pelizzoli
23	DF	ITA	Christian Panucci
24	FW	ITA	Marco Delvecchio
25	MF	URU	Gianni Guigou
26	DF	ITA	Damiano Ferronetti
27	MF	ITA	Daniele De Rossi
28	MF	ESP	Pep Guardiola
30	FW	ITA	Massimo Marazzina
31	DF	GRE	Traianos Dellas
32	DF	FRA	Vincent Candela
33	FW	ARG	Gabriel Batistuta
34	GK	ITA	Marco Paoloni
36	MF	NGR	Akande Ajide

=== Transfers ===
In
Pos.	Name	from	Type
DF	Christian Panucci	Monaco	€9.81 million
DF	Luigi Sartor	Parma	-
DF	Traianos Dellas	Perugia	end of contract
MF	Josep Guardiola	Brescia	free
MF	Davide Bombardini	Palermo	-
FW	Simone Pepe	Lecco	loan ended
FW	Gustavo Vassallo	Palermo	loan ended

Out
Pos.	Name	To	Type
DF	Christian Panucci	Monaco	loan ended
FW	Gustavo Vassallo	Alcalá	-
DF	Cesare Bovo	Lecce	-
DF	Antônio Carlos Zago	Beşiktaş	end of contract
MF	Marcos Assunção	Betis	-
FW	Giordano Meloni	Cesena	-
DF	Sebastiano Siviglia	Parma	-
FW	Abel Balbo	Boca Juniors	-
FW	Simone Pepe	Teramo	loan

==== Winter ====
In
Pos.	Name	from	Type
MF	Olivier Dacourt	Leeds United	loan
FW	Massimo Marazzina	Chievo	

Out
Pos.	Name	To	Type
MF	Josep Guardiola	Brescia	
FW	Gabriel Batistuta	Internazionale	loan

=== Kits ===
Home	Away	Third	Fourth	Home (Champions)	Away (Champions)	Goalkeeper	Goalkeeper Alt.

== Competitions ==
=== Overall ===
Competition	Started round	Final position	First match	Last match
Serie A	Matchday 1	8th	14 September 2002	24 May 2003
Coppa Italia	Round of 16	Runners-up	4 December 2002	31 May 2003
Champions League	Group stage	Second group stage	17 September 2002	19 March 2003

Last updated: 31 May 2003

=== Serie A ===
==== League table ====
Pos	Team	Pld	W	D	L	GF	GA	GD	Pts	Qualification or relegation
6	Udinese	34	16	8	10	38	35	+3	56	Qualification to UEFA Cup first round
7	Chievo	34	16	7	11	51	39	+12	55	
8	Roma (Note: Roma qualified for the first round of the 2003-04 UEFA Cup as Coppa Italia runner-up because the winner, Milan, qualified for Champions League through championship position.)	34	13	10	11	55	46	+9	49	Qualification to UEFA Cup first round
9	Brescia	34	9	15	10	36	38	−2	42 (Note: Brescia finished ahead of Perugia on head-to-head points: Brescia 3–1 Perugia, Perugia 0–0 Brescia.)	Qualification to Intertoto Cup second round
10	Perugia (Note: Perugia gained entry to the 2003 UEFA Intertoto Cup after Chievo renounced; then they qualified to the 2003–04 UEFA Cup First round.)	34	10	12	12	40	48	−8	42	Qualification to Intertoto Cup third round

Source: 2002–03 Serie A, Soccerway
Rules for classification: 1) Points; 2) Head-to-head points; 3) Head-to-head goal difference; 4) Goal difference; 5) Goals scored; 6) Draw. (Note: Head-to-head record is used only after all the matches between the teams in question have been played).

==== Results summary ====
Overall								Home						Away					
Pld	W	D	L	GF	GA	GD	Pts	W	D	L	GF	GA	GD	W	D	L	GF	GA	GD
34	13	10	11	55	46	+9	49	9	5	3	34	19	+15	4	5	8	21	27	−6

Last updated: 24 May 2003.
Source: Competitive matches

==== Results by round ====
Round	1	2	3	4	5	6	7	8	9	10	11	12	13	14	15	16	17	18	19	20	21	22	23	24	25	26	27	28	29	30	31	32	33	34
Ground	H	A	H	A	H	A	A	H	A	H	A	H	A	H	A	H	A	A	H	A	H	A	H	H	A	H	A	H	A	H	A	H	A	H
Result	W	L	L	W	W	W	D	D	D	D	L	D	L	W	W	L	L	L	W	D	D	L	W	D	L	W	D	W	L	W	W	W	D	L
Position	11	15	15	7	5	6	7	6	6	8	8	9	11	8	8	8	9	10	9	10	9	10	9	8	10	8	8	8	8	8	8	8	8	8

Source: Competitive matches
A = Away; H = Home; W = Win; D = Draw; L = Loss; = Leader, 2003–04 UEFA Champions League group stage; = 2003–04 UEFA Champions League group stage; = 2003–04 UEFA Champions League qualifying round; = 2003–04 UEFA Cup; = 2003 UEFA Intertoto Cup; = 2003–04 Serie B; R = 2003–04 UEFA Cup, AS Roma qualified to 2003-04 UEFA Cup due to 2003 Coppa Italia Final winners AC Milan having qualified to the 2003-04 UEFA Champions League
as incumbent champions.

==== Matches ====
14 September 2002 2	Bologna	2–1	Roma	Bologna
15:00 CEST (UTC+02:00)	Cruz 59', 90+1'	Report	Batistuta 44' (pen.)	Stadium: Stadio Renato Dall'Ara; Attendance: 27,349; Referee: Roberto Rosetti

22 September 2002 3	Roma	1–2	Modena	Rome
20:30 CEST (UTC+02:00)	Totti 5' (pen.)	Report	Milanetto 45' (pen.); Sculli 78'	Stadium: Stadio Olimpico; Attendance: 55,803; Referee: Stefano Farina

29 September 2002 4	Brescia	2–3	Roma	Brescia
15:00 CEST (UTC+02:00)	R. Baggio 45+2' (pen.); Schopp 84'	Report	Totti 30' (pen.), 41', 81'	Stadium: Stadio Mario Rigamonti; Attendance: 18,286; Referee: Paolo Dondarini

5 October 2002 5	Roma	4–1	Udinese	Rome
20:30 CEST (UTC+02:00)	Montella 23'; Batistuta 76'; Totti 81', 89'	Report	Sensini 59'	Stadium: Stadio Olimpico; Attendance: 53,729; Referee: Pierluigi Collina

19 October 2002 6	Empoli	1–3	Roma	Empoli
18:00 CEST (UTC+02:00)	Di Natale 77'	Report	Emerson 31'; Candela 34'; Tommasi 90+3'	Stadium: Stadio Carlo Castellani; Attendance: 13,060; Referee: Cosimo Bolognino

27 October 2002 7	Lazio	2–2	Roma	Rome
20:30 CET (UTC+01:00)	Fiore 51'; Stanković 75'	Report	Delvecchio 57'; Batistuta 66'	Stadium: Stadio Olimpico; Attendance: 69,877; Referee: Gianluca Paparesta

3 November 2002 8	Roma	2–2	Perugia	Rome
15:00 CET (UTC+01:00)	Panucci 67'; Totti 71'	Report	Zé Maria 39' (pen.); Miccoli 43'	Stadium: Stadio Olimpico; Attendance: 55,235; Referee: Alfredo Trentalange

6 November 2002 1	Roma	2–1	Como	Rome
20:45 CET (UTC+01:00)	Delvecchio 19'; Totti 46'	Report	Godeas 73'	Stadium: Stadio Olimpico; Attendance: 53,000; Referee: Cosimo Bolognino

9 November 2002 9	Piacenza	1–1	Roma	Piacenza
20:30 CET (UTC+01:00)	Maresca 74'	Report	Cassano 27'	Stadium: Stadio Leonardo Garilli; Attendance: 8,302; Referee: Pierluigi Collina

16 November 2002 10	Roma	2–2	Internazionale	Rome
20:30 CET (UTC+01:00)	Montella 59'; Batistuta 73'	Report	Morfeo 58'; Okan 89'	Stadium: Stadio Olimpico; Attendance: 67,726; Referee: Salvatore Racalbuto

24 November 2002 11	Parma	3–0	Roma	Parma
15:00 CET (UTC+01:00)	Bonazzoli 10', 72'; Mutu 23' (pen.)	Report		Stadium: Stadio Ennio Tardini; Attendance: 17,223; Referee: Pierluigi Collina

1 December 2002 12	Roma	2–2	Juventus	Rome
20:30 CET (UTC+01:00)	Totti 12'; Cassano 44'	Report	Del Piero 45+2'; Nedvěd 85'	Stadium: Stadio Olimpico; Attendance: 74,313; Referee: Paolo Bertini

7 December 2002 13	Milan	1–0	Roma	Milan
20:30 CET (UTC+01:00)	Inzaghi 73'	Report		Stadium: San Siro; Attendance: 67,786; Referee: Pierluigi Collina

15 December 2002 14	Roma	3–0	Reggina	Rome
15:00 CET (UTC+01:00)	Samuel 3'; Totti 24'; Montella 70'	Report		Stadium: Stadio Olimpico; Attendance: 52,591; Referee: Domenico Messina

21 December 2002 15	Torino	0–1	Roma	Turin
20:30 CET (UTC+01:00)		Report	Samuel 46'	Stadium: Stadio delle Alpi; Attendance: 14,025; Referee: Paolo Dondarini

12 January 2003 16	Roma	0–1	Chievo	Rome
15:00 CET (UTC+01:00)		Report	Cossato 89'	Stadium: Stadio Olimpico; Attendance: 55,975; Referee: Domenico Messina

19 January 2003 17	Atalanta	2–1	Roma	Bergamo
15:00 CET (UTC+01:00)	Doni 41'; Tramezzani 87'	Report	Totti 9'	Stadium: Stadio Atleti Azzurri d'Italia; Attendance: 14,873; Referee: Alfredo Trentalange

25 January 2003 18	Como	2–0	Roma	Piacenza
20:30 CET (UTC+01:00)	Musić 82'; Carbone 90+1'	Report		Stadium: Stadio Leonardo Garilli; Attendance: 6,520; Referee: Fiorenzo Treossi

1 February 2003 19	Roma	3–1	Bologna	Rome
20:30 CET (UTC+01:00)	Montella 35'; Delvecchio 52'; Cassano 72'	Report	Signori 42'	Stadium: Stadio Olimpico; Attendance: 52,795; Referee: Daniele Tombolini

9 February 2003 20	Modena	1–1	Roma	Modena
15:00 CET (UTC+01:00)	Kamara 42'	Report	Dellas 90'	Stadium: Stadio Alberto Braglia; Attendance: 15,463; Referee: Roberto Rosetti

15 February 2003 21	Roma	0–0	Brescia	Rome
20:30 CET (UTC+01:00)		Report		Stadium: Stadio Olimpico; Attendance: 53,235; Referee: Matteo Trefoloni

23 February 2003 22	Udinese	2–1	Roma	Udine
15:00 CET (UTC+01:00)	Sensini 35'; Iaquinta 72'	Report	Montella 54'	Stadium: Stadio Friuli; Attendance: 16,339; Referee: Tiziano Pieri

2 March 2003 23	Roma	3–1	Empoli	Rome
15:00 CET (UTC+01:00)	Totti 31'; Montella 49', 68'	Report	Di Natale 11'	Stadium: Stadio Olimpico; Attendance: 52,736; Referee: Cosimo Bolognino

8 March 2003 24	Roma	1–1	Lazio	Rome
20:30 CET (UTC+01:00)	Cassano 89'	Report	Stanković 8'	Stadium: Stadio Olimpico; Attendance: 72,668; Referee: Domenico Messina

16 March 2003 25	Perugia	1–0	Roma	Perugia
15:00 CET (UTC+01:00)	Miccoli 52'	Report		Stadium: Stadio Renato Curi; Attendance: 11,099; Referee: Massimiliano Saccani

23 March 2003 26	Roma	3–0	Piacenza	Rome
15:00 CET (UTC+01:00)	Cassano 11'; Delvecchio 30'; Totti 43'	Report		Stadium: Stadio Olimpico; Attendance: 51,018; Referee: Roberto Rosetti

6 April 2003 27	Internazionale	3–3	Roma	Milan
20:30 CEST (UTC+02:00)	Vieri 52'; Recoba 59'; Emre 77'	Report	Cassano 46'; Di Biagio 82' (o.g.); Montella 84'	Stadium: San Siro; Attendance: 64,142; Referee: Pierluigi Collina

13 April 2003 28	Roma	2–1	Parma	Rome
15:00 CEST (UTC+02:00)	Totti 45+1'; Guigou 73'	Report	Adriano 40'	Stadium: Stadio Olimpico; Attendance: 55,320; Referee: Matteo Trefoloni

19 April 2003 29	Juventus	2–1	Roma	Turin
20:30 CEST (UTC+02:00)	Del Piero 30' (pen.), 39'	Report	Montella 44'	Stadium: Stadio delle Alpi; Attendance: 42,592; Referee: Emilio Pellegrino

26 April 2003 30	Roma	2–1	Milan	Rome
20:30 CEST (UTC+02:00)	Cassano 60'; Tommasi 76'	Report	Tomasson 81'	Stadium: Stadio Olimpico; Attendance: 60,313; Referee: Gianluca Paparesta

3 May 2003 31	Reggina	2–3	Roma	Reggio Calabria
15:00 CEST (UTC+02:00)	Bonazzoli 16'; Nakamura 90+2'	Report	Tommasi 61'; Emerson 63'; Vargas 68' (o.g.)	Stadium: Stadio Oreste Granillo; Attendance: 24,006; Referee: Stefano Cassarà

10 May 2003 32	Roma	3–1	Torino	Rome
15:00 CEST (UTC+02:00)	Cassano 31', 61'; De Rossi 54'	Report	Frezza 77'	Stadium: Stadio Olimpico; Attendance: 52,716; Referee: Tiziano Pieri

17 May 2003 33	Chievo	0–0	Roma	Verona
15:00 CEST (UTC+02:00)		Report		Stadium: Stadio Marc'Antonio Bentegodi; Attendance: 14,869; Referee: Roberto Rosetti

24 May 2003 34	Roma	1–2	Atalanta	Rome
15:00 CEST (UTC+02:00)	De Rossi 30'	Report	Doni 27'; Gautieri 55'	Stadium: Stadio Olimpico; Attendance: 52,547; Referee: Emilio Pellegrino

=== Coppa Italia ===
==== Round of 16 ====
4 December 2002 First leg	Triestina	1–1	Roma	Trieste
18:15 CET (UTC+01:00)	Beretta 63'		Batistuta 87'	Stadium: Stadio Nereo Rocco; Referee: Emilio Pellegrino

17 December 2002 Second leg	Roma	1–1 (a.e.t.) (2–2 agg.) (4–1 p)	Triestina	Rome
17:30 CET (UTC+01:00)	Maietta 33' (o.g.)		Fava 72'	Stadium: Stadio Olimpico; Referee: Antonio Dattilo
	Penalties
	De Rossi (penalty scored); Montella (penalty scored); Zebina (penalty scored); Candela (penalty scored)		(penalty scored) Ferri; (penalty missed) Bega; (penalty missed) Gubellini

==== Quarter-finals ====
16 January 2003 First leg	Vicenza	1–2	Roma	Vicenza
21:00 CET (UTC+01:00)	Zanchetta 70'		Montella 40'; Delvecchio 66'	Stadium: Stadio Romeo Menti; Referee: Nicola Ayroldi

22 January 2003 Second leg	Roma	6–3 (8–4 agg.)	Vicenza	Rome
17:30 CET (UTC+01:00)	Delvecchio 10', 21', 37'; Emerson 39', 79'; Cafu 89' (pen.)		Jeda 5'; Schwoch 44' (pen.); Veronese 55'	Stadium: Stadio Olimpico; Referee: Daniele Tombolini

==== Semi-finals ====
5 February 2003 First leg	Lazio	1–2	Roma	Rome
20:30 CET (UTC+01:00)	Fiore 76'		Cassano 12'; Emerson 49'	Stadium: Stadio Olimpico; Referee: Matteo Trefoloni

16 April 2003 Second leg	Roma	1–0 (3–1 agg.)	Lazio	Rome
20:30 CEST (UTC+02:00)	Montella 56'			Stadium: Stadio Olimpico; Referee: Pierluigi Collina

==== Final ====
20 May 2003 First leg	Roma	1–4	Milan	Rome
20:45 CEST (UTC+02:00)	Totti 28'		Serginho 62' (pen.), 73'; Ambrosini 70'; Shevchenko 89'	Stadium: Stadio Olimpico; Attendance: 60,647; Referee: Gianluca Paparesta

31 May 2003 Second leg	Milan	2–2 (6–3 agg.)	Roma	Milan
20:45 CEST (UTC+02:00)	Rivaldo 65'; Inzaghi 90+3'		Totti 56', 64'	Stadium: San Siro; Attendance: 76,061; Referee: Roberto Rosetti

=== UEFA Champions League ===
==== Group stage ====
Pos	Team	Pld	W	D	L	GF	GA	GD	Pts	Qualification
1	(Spain) Real Madrid	6	2	3	1	15	7	+8	9	Advance to second group stage
2	(Italy) Roma	6	2	3	1	3	4	−1	9	Advance to second group stage
3	(Greece) AEK Athens	6	0	6	0	7	7	0	6	Transfer to UEFA Cup
4	(Belgium) Genk	6	0	4	2	2	9	−7	4	

Source: RSSSF

17 September 2002 1	Roma (Italy)	0–3	(Spain) Real Madrid	Rome, Italy
20:45 CEST (UTC+02:00)	Montella (yellow card) 33'	Report	Helguera (yellow card) 21'; Guti 41', 74'; Raúl 56'; Hierro (yellow card) 66'	Stadium: Stadio Olimpico; Attendance: 71,130; Referee: Markus Merk (Germany)

25 September 2002 2	AEK Athens (Greece)	0–0	(Italy) Roma	Athens, Greece
20:45 CEST (UTC+02:00)	Kostenoglou (yellow card) 53'; Lakis (yellow card) 71'	Report	Panucci (yellow card) 25'	Stadium: Nikos Goumas Stadium; Attendance: 12,784; Referee: Graham Barber (England)

2 October 2002 3	Genk (Belgium)	0–1	(Italy) Roma	Genk, Belgium
20:45 CEST (UTC+02:00)	Moons (red card) 10'; Zokora (yellow card) 72'; Skoko (yellow card) 88'	Report	Tommasi (yellow card) 20'; Candela (yellow card) 31'; Samuel (yellow card) 41'; Batistuta (yellow card) 51'; Emerson (yellow card) 77'; Cassano 81'	Stadium: Cristal Arena; Attendance: 22,260; Referee: Alain Sars (France)

22 October 2002 4	Roma (Italy)	0–0	(Belgium) Genk	Rome, Italy
20:45 CEST (UTC+02:00)		Report	Daerden (yellow card) 74'; Schollen (yellow card) 90+3'	Stadium: Stadio Olimpico; Attendance: 25,592; Referee: Željko Širić (FR Yugoslavia)

30 October 2002 5	Real Madrid (Spain)	0–1	(Italy) Roma	Madrid, Spain
20:45 CET (UTC+01:00)	Salgado (yellow card) 43'	Report	Totti 27'; Tommasi (yellow card) 42'; Aldair (yellow card) 57'	Stadium: Santiago Bernabéu; Attendance: 72,035; Referee: Hugh Dallas (Scotland)

12 November 2002 6	Roma (Italy)	1–1	(Greece) AEK Athens	Rome, Italy
20:45 CET (UTC+01:00)	Delvecchio 40', (yellow card) 49'	Report	Zagorakis (yellow card) 62'; Centeno 90'	Stadium: Stadio Olimpico; Attendance: 32,734; Referee: Stéphane Bré (France)

==== Second group stage ====
Pos	Team	Pld	W	D	L	GF	GA	GD	Pts	Qualification
1	(Spain) Valencia	6	2	3	1	5	6	−1	9	Advance to knockout stage
2	(Netherlands) Ajax	6	1	5	0	6	5	+1	8	Advance to knockout stage
3	(England) Arsenal	6	1	4	1	6	5	+1	7	
4	(Italy) Roma	6	1	2	3	7	8	−1	5	

Source: RSSSF

27 November 2002 1	Roma (Italy)	1–3	(England) Arsenal	Rome, Italy
20:45 CET (UTC+01:00)	Cassano 4'; Samuel (yellow card) 41'; Emerson (yellow card) 74'; Batistuta (yellow card) 80'	Report	Henry 6', 70', 75'	Stadium: Stadio Olimpico; Attendance: 70,000; Referee: Ľuboš Micheľ (Slovakia)

10 December 2002 2	Ajax (Netherlands)	2–1	(Italy) Roma	Amsterdam, Netherlands
20:45 CET (UTC+01:00)	Ibrahimović 11'; Trabelsi (yellow card) 32'; Litmanen 66'	Report	Samuel (yellow card) 40'; Totti (yellow card) 23'; Batistuta 89'; Emerson (yellow card) 90'; Candela (yellow card) 90+3'	Stadium: Amsterdam Arena; Attendance: 50,148; Referee: Markus Merk (Germany)

18 February 2003 3	Roma (Italy)	0–1	(Spain) Valencia	Rome, Italy
20:45 CET (UTC+01:00)	Zebina (yellow card) 60'; Guigou (yellow card) 81'	Report	Cañizares (yellow card) 9'; González (yellow card) 68'; Carew 78'; Mista (yellow card) 84'	Stadium: Stadio Olimpico; Attendance: 31,000; Referee: Wolfgang Stark (Germany)

26 February 2003 4	Valencia (Spain)	0–3	(Italy) Roma	Valencia, Spain
20:45 CET (UTC+01:00)	Rufete (yellow card) 26'	Report	Totti 24', 30'; Emerson 36'; Zebina (yellow card) 51'; Samuel (yellow card) 69'	Stadium: Mestalla; Attendance: 35,000; Referee: Frank De Bleeckere (Belgium)

11 March 2003 5	Arsenal (England)	1–1	(Italy) Roma	London, England
20:45 CET (UTC+01:00)	Vieira 12'; Van Bronckhorst (yellow card) 29'	Report	Totti (red card) 22'; Cassano (yellow card) 28', (goal) 45+2'; Samuel (yellow card) 32'; Aldair (yellow card) 67'	Stadium: Highbury; Attendance: 35,472; Referee: Urs Meier (Switzerland)

19 March 2003 6	Roma (Italy)	1–1	(Netherlands) Ajax	Rome, Italy
20:45 CET (UTC+01:00)	Cassano 24'; Delvecchio (yellow card) 27'; Cufré (yellow card) 66'; Aldair (yellow card) 74'	Report	Van der Meyde 1', (yellow card) 37'; Lobonț (yellow card) 52'	Stadium: Stadio Olimpico; Attendance: 62,000; Referee: Herbert Fandel (Germany)

== Statistics ==
=== Appearances and goals ===
No.	Pos	Nat	Player	Total		Serie A		Coppa		Champions League	
No.	Pos	Nat	Player	Apps	Goals	Apps	Goals	Apps	Goals	Apps	Goals
22	GK	(Italy) ITA	Pelizzoli	28	-34	18+1	-22	6	-9	3	-3
2	DF	(Brazil) BRA	Cafu	41	1	25+1	0	3	1	12	0
5	DF	(France) FRA	Zebina	27	4	18+1	4	0	0	7+1	0
19	DF	(Argentina) ARG	Samuel	47	2	31	2	6	0	10	0
23	DF	(Italy) ITA	Panucci	46	1	29	1	6	0	11	0
32	DF	(France) FRA	Candela	41	1	23	1	8	0	10	0
8	MF	(Brazil) BRA	Lima	45	0	27+1	0	6	0	10+1	0
11	MF	(Brazil) BRA	Emerson	48	6	31	2	6	3	11	1
15	MF	(France) FRA	Dacourt	23	0	18	0	5	0	0	0
10	FW	(Italy) ITA	Totti	35	20	23+1	14	5	3	6	3
9	FW	(Italy) ITA	Montella	45	11	22+7	9	5	2	5+6	0
1	GK	(Italy) ITA	Antonioli	21	-30	16	2	-4	-23	9	-9
18	FW	(Italy) ITA	Cassano	43	14	15+12	9	5	1	8+3	4
6	DF	(Brazil) BRA	Aldair	22	1	15+2	1	0	0	5	0
17	MF	(Italy) ITA	Tommasi	36	3	14+6	3	6	0	10	0
24	FW	(Italy) ITA	Delvecchio	26	11	13+3	6	4	4	5+1	1
31	DF	(Greece) GRE	Dellas	17	1	9+1	1	4	0	3	0
13	DF	(Argentina) ARG	Cufre	17	0	5+3	0	3	0	3+3	0
25	MF	(Uruguay) URU	Guigou	23	1	4+10	1	3	0	1+5	0
4	DF	(Italy) ITA	Sartor	14	0	4+8	0	2	0		
27	MF	(Italy) ITA	De Rossi	7	2	3+1	2	3	0		
30	FW	(Italy) ITA	Marazzina	7	0	2+5	0	0	0		
20	MF	(Italy) ITA	Bombardini	13	0	1+7	0	2	0	0+3	0
14	FW	(Serbia and Montenegro) SCG	Tomić	7	0	0+3	0	3	0	0+1	0
7	MF	(Italy) ITA	Fuser	7	0	0+3	0	2	0	0+2	0
12	GK	(Italy) ITA	Zotti	1	0	0+1	0	0	0		
26	DF	(Italy) ITA	Ferronetti	1	0	0+1	0	0	0		
21	MF	(Italy) ITA	Aquilani	2	0	0+1	0	1	0		
36	MF	(Nigeria) NGR	Ajide	0	0	0	0				
34	GK	(Italy) ITA	Paoloni	0	0	0	0	0	0		
Players transferred out during the season
28	MF	(Spain) ESP	Guardiola	6	0	2+2	0	1	0	0+1	0
33	FW	(Argentina) ARG	Batistuta	20	3	6+6	1	2	1	3+3	1

Source: http://calcio-seriea.net/presenze/2002/1224/

=== Goalscorers ===
Rank	No.	Pos	Nat	Name	Serie A	Coppa Italia	UEFA CL	Total
1	10	FW	(Italy)	Francesco Totti	14	3	3	20
2	18	FW	(Italy)	Antonio Cassano	9	1	4	14
3	9	FW	(Italy)	Vincenzo Montella	9	2	0	11
4	24	FW	(Italy)	Marco Delvecchio	4	4	1	9
5	11	MF	(Brazil)	Emerson	2	3	1	6
5	33	FW	(Argentina)	Gabriel Batistuta	4	1	1	6
7	17	MF	(Italy)	Damiano Tommasi	3	0	0	3
8	19	DF	(Argentina)	Walter Samuel	2	0	0	2
8	27	MF	(Italy)	Daniele De Rossi	2	0	0	2
10	2	DF	(Brazil)	Cafu	0	1	0	1
10	23	DF	(Italy)	Christian Panucci	1	0	0	1
10	25	MF	(Uruguay)	Gianni Guigou	1	0	0	1
10	31	DF	(Greece)	Traianos Dellas	1	0	0	1
10	32	DF	(France)	Vincent Candela	1	0	0	1
Own goal					2	1	0	3
Totals					55	16	10	81

Last updated: 31 May 2003

=== Clean sheets ===
Rank	No.	Pos	Nat	Name	Serie A	Coppa Italia	UEFA CL	Total
1	1	GK	(Italy)	Francesco Antonioli	1	0	5	6
2	22	GK	(Italy)	Ivan Pelizzoli	4	1	0	5
Totals					5	1	5	11

Last updated: 31 May 2003
