= Alberto Aquilani =

Italian football manager (born 1984)

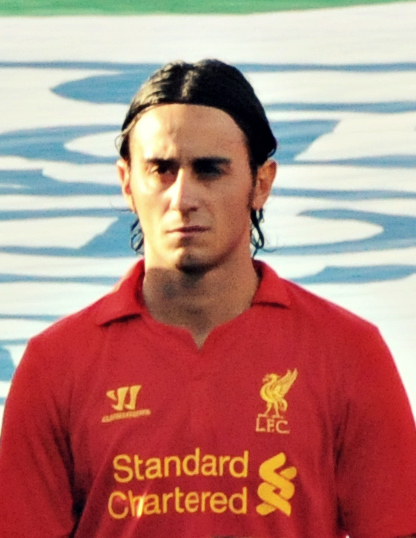
- Aquilani with Liverpool in 2012

Personal information
- Full name: Alberto Aquilani
- Date of birth: 7 July 1984 (age 42)
- Place of birth: Rome, Italy
- Height: 1.86 m (6 ft 1 in)
- Position: Midfielder

Youth career
- 1999–2002: Roma

Senior career*
Years	Team	Apps	(Gls)
2002–2009	Roma	102	(9)
2003–2004	→ Triestina (loan)	41	(4)
2009–2012	Liverpool	18	(1)
2010–2011	→ Juventus (loan)	33	(2)
2011–2012	→ Milan (loan)	23	(1)
2012–2015	Fiorentina	81	(13)
2015–2016	Sporting CP	19	(3)
2016–2017	Pescara	9	(1)
2017	→ Sassuolo (loan)	16	(0)
2017–2018	Las Palmas	21	(0)
Total		358	(33)

International career
2000	Italy U16	8	(0)
2000–2001	Italy U17	13	(0)
2001–2002	Italy U18	8	(0)
2001–2003	Italy U19	18	(3)
2003	Italy U20	2	(1)
2004–2007	Italy U21	20	(5)
2006–2014	Italy	38	(5)

Managerial career
- 2023–2024: Pisa
- 2025–2026: Catanzaro
- 2026: Sassuolo
Medal record
Men's Football
Representing Italy
FIFA Confederations Cup
Third place	2013 Brazil
- * Club domestic league appearances and goals

Alberto Aquilani (Italian pronunciation: [alˈbɛrto akwiˈlaːni]; born 7 July 1984) is an Italian football manager and former player who was most recently the manager of Serie A club Sassuolo. Mainly a central midfielder, he usually operated as a deep-lying playmaker but was also capable of playing as an attacking midfielder.

Aquilani began his career with Italian side Roma and, after a brief loan spell at Triestina, returned to the Serie A club where he became a regular in the Roma side during the 2005–06 season, earning the nickname "Il Principino" (The Little Prince), due to his resemblance to former Roma legend Giuseppe Giannini, both in terms of appearance and playing style, who was known as "Il Principe" (The Prince). During the following season, he suffered a thigh injury and was ruled out for several months. In 2007 and 2008 he won consecutive Coppa Italia titles with Roma, as well as the 2007 Supercoppa Italiana.

He moved to English club Liverpool for the start of the 2009–10 season but in August 2010, having received only limited playing time at Anfield due to injury, he returned to Italy and joined Juventus on loan until the end of the 2010–11 season. Aquilani returned to Liverpool at the end of the season as Juventus did not take up their purchase option. He went on loan again in 2011, playing for Italian club Milan for the 2011–12 season, and was subsequently sold to Fiorentina in 2012, where he remained until his transfer to Portuguese club Sporting CP in 2015; he returned to Italy in 2016, joining Pescara, and was later loaned to Sassuolo for the second half the season. In 2017, he joined Spanish club Las Palmas, but was released by the club at the end of the season. After a year without a club, he announced his retirement in 2019.

Internationally, Aquilani has represented Italy at various youth levels, while at senior level, he made his full international début in November 2006 in a 1–1 draw against Turkey. In total, he made 38 appearances for Italy between 2006 and 2014, scoring 5 goals, and also took part at Euro 2008, the 2013 FIFA Confederations Cup (winning a bronze medal in the tournament), and the 2014 FIFA World Cup with the Italian senior team.

== Club career ==
=== Roma ===
In 2001, when Aquilani was 17, Chelsea and Arsenal offered him contracts, but he declined the offers to continue playing for his youth club Roma.

He made his debut in Serie A at the age of 18 on 10 May 2002 under then manager Fabio Capello against Torino. Roma won that game 3–1. He was loaned to Serie B club Triestina for the 2003–04 season to gain first team experience.

Returning to Roma in the 2004–05 season, Aquilani broke into the starting XI. On 31 March 2005, he signed a new five-year contract with Roma, which worth €1.1 million, €1.25M, €1.48M, €1.61M and €1.79M respectively from 2005 to 2010 in gross annually. In the 2005–06 season, he scored the second goal in the derby victory on 26 February 2006, a victory in which Roma broke the record for the most consecutive wins in Serie A, a record later broken by Inter Milan in the 2006–07 season.

In the following season, Aquilani was expected to be one of Roma's best players. He was given the number 8 shirt previously worn by Matteo Ferrari. Unfortunately, an injury forced him out of the game for several months. Aquilani returned to the field in May 2007 and featured in three games towards the end of the season, including the last two.

He scored two long range goals in the first two matches of the 2007–08 season against Palermo and Siena. Although he was injured in October 2007, he returned to the squad in January 2008.

Aquilani was injured again on 22 October 2008 against Chelsea. He returned to action on 11 January 2009 against Milan but picked up another injury in February. Although he played against Arsenal as a last minute substitute on 11 March 2009, he did not play any part for the rest of the season.

On 26 May 2009, Aquilani signed a new contract with Roma until 2013, adding three more years to previous deal. He was offered an annual gross salary of €3.2 million for 2008–09 season; €3.6 million in 2009–10 season; €3.9 million in 2010–11 season and ultimately €4.2 million in the last two-year of the contract.

=== Liverpool ===
On 5 August 2009, Liverpool announced that they had agreed a deal with Roma for the transfer of Aquilani, subject to a medical test. The club subsequently announced that the player had passed the medical test and signed a five-year contract on 7 August 2009. Roma revealed that the fee was €20 million (£17 million) plus sporting bonus. Aquilani was handed the number 4 shirt, last worn by Sami Hyypiä, who joined Bayer Leverkusen at the end of the 2008–09 season.

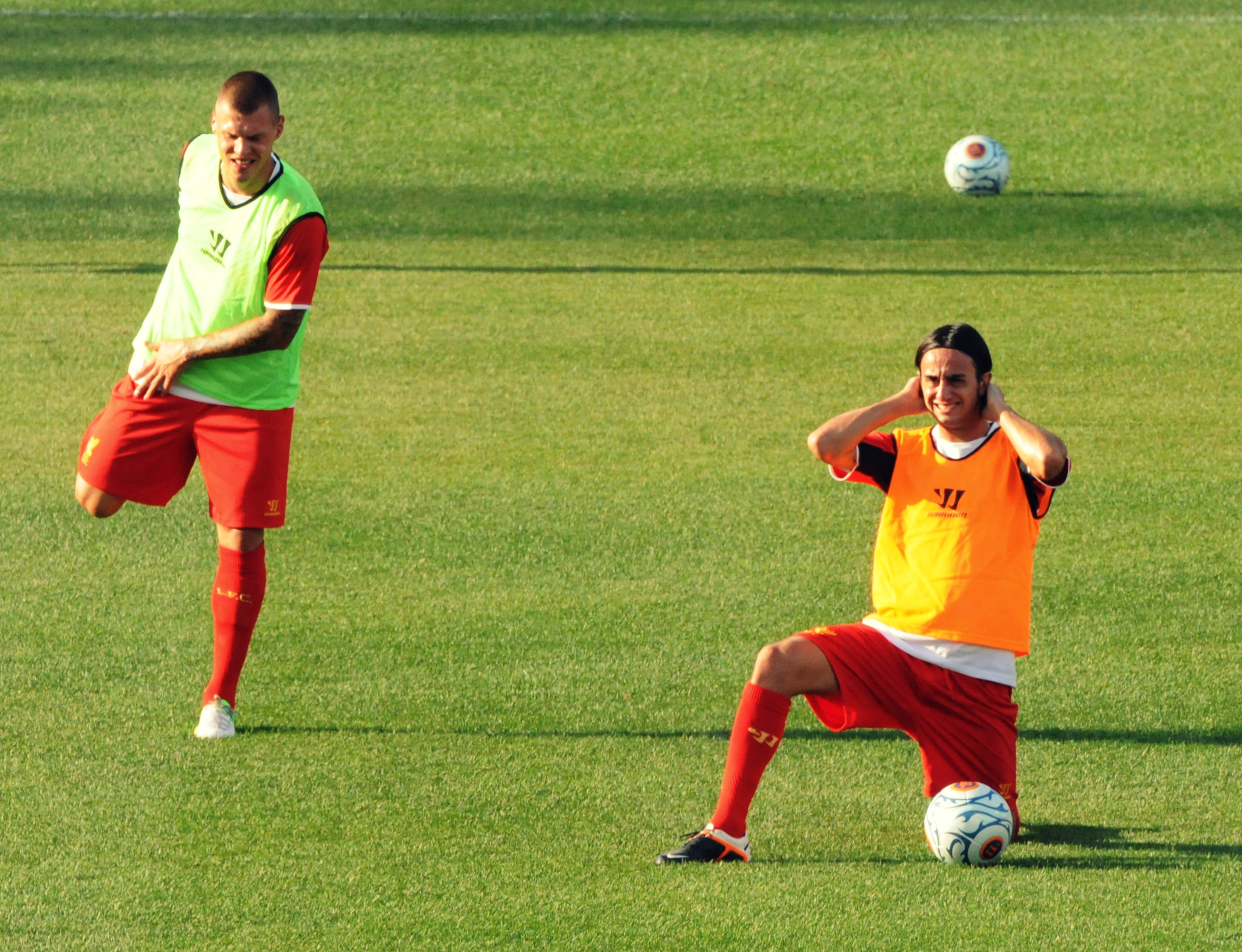
Martin Škrtel and Aquilani warming up before the game between Liverpool and Roma.

Aquilani made his Liverpool reserves debut with a 15-minute substitute appearance in a 2–0 win against Sunderland reserves on 21 October 2009. His first game for Liverpool was a 2–1 4th round League Cup defeat to Arsenal, coming on in the 77th minute for Damien Plessis. He made his Premier League debut on 9 November, as a late substitute against Birmingham City in a 2–2 draw. Aquilani made his first start against Fiorentina in a Champions League match on 9 December 2009, where Liverpool lost 2–1. Aquilani made his first Premier League start against Wolves on 26 December 2009 and received a standing ovation from the Kop when he was substituted in the 84th minute for Daniel Pacheco.

Aquilani next started for Liverpool in their 2–0 win over Bolton Wanderers, where he got his second assist for Liverpool, again setting up Dirk Kuyt. He scored his first goal for Liverpool on 15 March 2010 against Portsmouth and he also assisted Fernando Torres for the fourth Liverpool goal. He was voted man of the match by the fans on Liverpool's official website. Aquilani also gained the man of the match award in his next Liverpool league start, against Fulham in a goalless draw at Anfield. In his next start for Liverpool he finished the match with three assists during a 4–0 away win against Burnley On 29 April 2010 he scored a goal against Atlético Madrid in the Europa League, cancelling out Atlético's first leg goal from Diego Forlán by scoring moments before half-time. Despite a great performance from Aquilani on the night, Liverpool eventually went out of the semi-finals on the away goal rule after Yossi Benayoun had put Liverpool 2–0 up, as Forlán scored his second of the tie in extra-time to take the aggregate score to 2–2. Aquilani won the LFC Man of the Match award again after his performance.

Aquilani also played in Liverpool's last 2 games of the season, a 2–0 defeat at the hands of Chelsea at Anfield and a goalless draw away to Hull City at the KC Stadium. In total, Aquilani played 26 times in his debut season for the reds, scoring twice but rarely playing the full 90 minutes.

With the departure of Rafael Benítez in June 2010, new manager Roy Hodgson played him in the pre-season, but stated publicly in mid-August that Aquilani may go back to his native Italy on loan for a full season, where he could gain match fitness through regular appearances.

==== Loan to Juventus ====
On 21 August 2010, a deal between Liverpool and Juventus was agreed, to allow Aquilani to go on a one-season loan deal to Juventus with an option of a permanent move. He made his debut for the Bianconeri on 12 September in a 3–3 draw with Sampdoria from coming on as a substitute for Simone Pepe. He came on as a sub again on 23 September in a 3–1 home defeat to Sicilian club Palermo. His first start for the club came on 26 September in a 4–2 win against Cagliari. After that Aquilani played 80 minutes against reigning champions Inter Milan in a goalless draw before he scored his first goal for the club on 17 October in a 4–0 home win against Lecce two weeks later. He played his first full 90 minutes away to Bologna in another 0–0 draw. On 5 February, he played the full 90 minutes in a 3–1 away win over Cagliari with his next match being against Inter in a 1–0 win. On 21 April, Kenny Dalglish claimed Aquilani still had a future at Liverpool, despite claims that he wanted to remain in Italy. Aquilani returned to Liverpool after Juventus decided against making his transfer permanent.

==== Loan to Milan ====
On 4 July 2011, Aquilani started pre-season training with Liverpool, though his agent later confirmed that his wish was to stay at Juventus in Serie A. He was included in the squad's pre-season tour of Asia and marked his return to the team in a friendly against Guangdong Sunray Cave on 13 July. He subsequently impressed against a Malaysian XI on 16 July 2011.

On 25 August 2011, Aquilani joined AC Milan on loan for the 2011–12 season with Milan having an option to make the move permanent at the end of the season, despite pulling a string of impressive performances during the pre-season tour in Asia. Liverpool manager Kenny Dalglish paid tribute to Aquilani on his departure, stating that the only reason for the loan was an inability to fit the player into the team's preferred formation. Damien Comolli, Liverpool director of football, said, "I want to pay tribute to the way Alberto has conducted himself during these discussions. Throughout the entire process, his only desire has been to play football and he has put this ahead of any other considerations and at personal cost to himself."

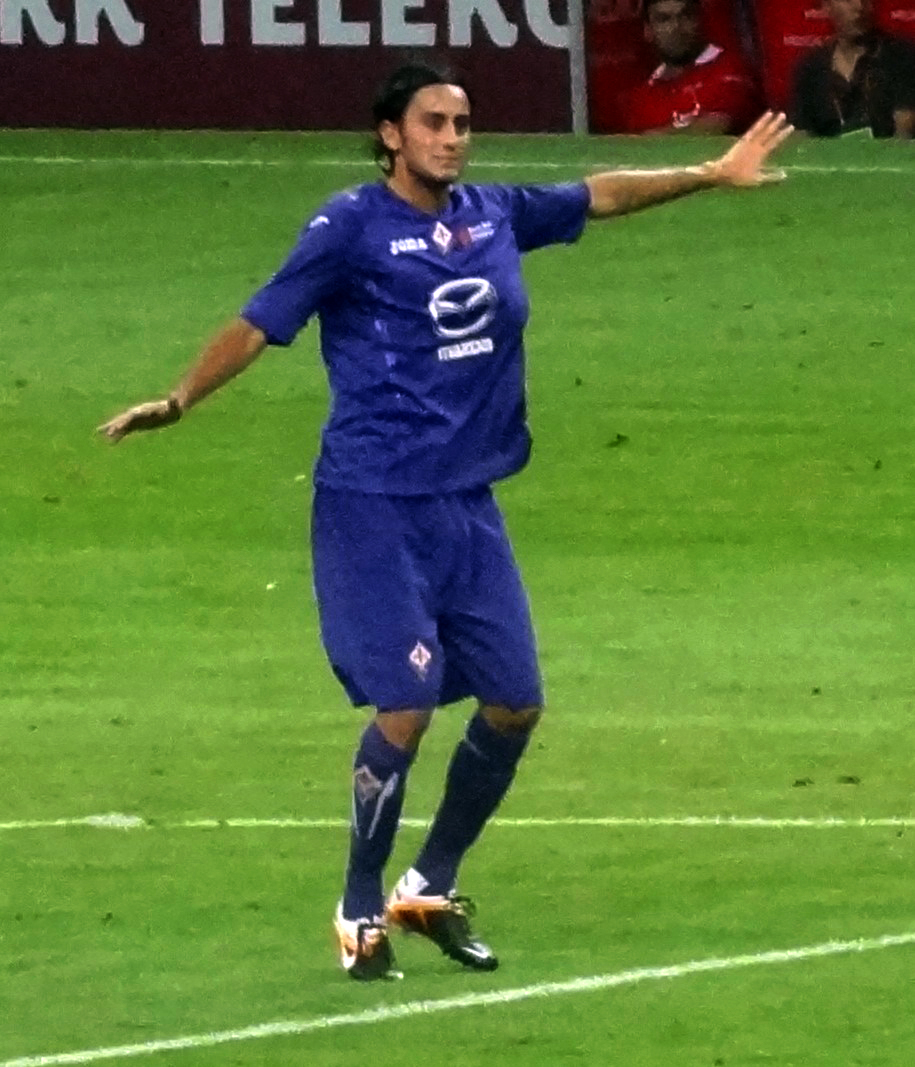
Aquilani playing for Fiorentina.

Aquilani made his debut for the Rossoneri in the opening game of the 2011–12 season against Lazio, and had an immediate impact by being involved in the build-up for Milan's first goal with a neat pass to Antonio Cassano, and assisting the second goal himself from a corner-kick. On 13 September 2011, he made his European debut for Milan in the UEFA Champions League against Barcelona at the Camp Nou, coming off the bench to help Milan secure a 2–2 draw. On 18 September 2011, Aquilani scored his first goal for Milan in his second Serie A match for the club, heading home a cross from Cassano to open the scoring against Napoli at the San Paolo in Naples.

=== Fiorentina ===
Aquilani returned to Liverpool for pre-season training in preparation for their 2012–13 season. He was included in the squad for Liverpool's pre-season tour of North America and played 45 minutes in the opening match against Toronto FC. The club accepted an undisclosed fee for the midfielder from Fiorentina in Italy, and his transfer was completed on 3 August 2012. Following the transfer, Aquilani averred that only an excessive price that Liverpool had placed on him had prevented him completing permanent moves to AC Milan and Juventus following his successful loan spells. Fiorentina revealed that Aquilani had only cost the club €790,000 as other cost. Liverpool allowed Aquilani to leave the club for free thus Roma also received nothing from the bonus clause.

On 26 January 2014, in a match against Genoa, Aquilani scored his first career hat-trick in a thrilling 3–3 draw. Aquilani reached the 2014 Coppa Italia Final with Fiorentina that season, where they were defeated by Napoli. The following season, Fiorentina finished the league in fourth place for a third consecutive season, while also reaching the semi-finals of the 2014–15 UEFA Europa League.

=== Sporting CP ===
Following the conclusion of the 2014–15 season with Fiorentina, Aquilani became a free agent after his contract was not renewed. In August 2015, he signed with Portuguese club Sporting CP on a three-year contract, reportedly worth €1 million per season.

=== Pescara ===
On 26 August 2016, Aquilani signed with Pescara.

==== Loan to Sassuolo ====
On 3 January 2017, Aquilani signed with Sassuolo on loan until the end of the 2016–17 season.

=== Las Palmas ===
On 25 August 2017 and following his departure from Pescara, Aquilani signed a two-year contract with Spanish La Liga side Las Palmas. In July 2018, following the club's relegation, Aquilani was released from his contract.

On 28 June 2019, after one season without a club, Aquilani announced his retirement.

== International career ==
At youth level, Aquilani was capped for Italy at 2001 UEFA European Under-16 Championship qualifying. He won 2003 UEFA European Under-19 Championship with Italy and scored one goal, later being named the tournament's best player. He was then promoted to the U21 team and took part in 2006 UEFA European Under-21 Championship qualifying, but missed out on the final tournament due to injury.

Aquilani made his senior debut on 15 November 2006 in a 1–1 friendly against Turkey.

He played as a regular during the 2007 U-21 Championship held in the Netherlands, scoring two goals, and being named in the "UEFA Team of the Tournament". Italy finished 5th and qualified for the 2008 Olympics. He was named to the 23-man roster for Euro 2008, his first major international tournament. He came on as a sub in Italy's third game of the tournament, which was a 2–0 victory over France. He started Italy's quarter-final match against Spain due to the suspensions of Andrea Pirlo and Gennaro Gattuso. Italy lost 4–2 in a penalty shootout after a goalless draw after extra time.

Aquilani scored his first goal for Italy during the 2010 World Cup qualification match against Montenegro on 15 October 2008, a tally he doubled later in the same match. In spite of this, the national team manager Marcello Lippi opted not to include him in the 23-man Italian squad for the 2010 FIFA World Cup.

In Italy's UEFA Euro 2012 qualification campaign, Aquilani played his first game in a 1–0 away win against Slovenia on 25 March 2011, playing for the full 90 minutes. He also started in Italy's next match at home against Estonia on 3 June, but came off in the first half of the 3–0 win due to a head injury. On 10 August 2011, he scored his third international goal with the late winner in a friendly against defending world champions Spain.

Aquilani took part at the 2013 FIFA Confederations Cup under manager Cesare Prandelli, where Italy managed a third-place finish; in the victorious bronze medal match against Uruguay, he converted a penalty in the resulting shoot-out.

On 11 October 2013, Aquilani scored the late equalizing goal in Italy's 2–2 away draw against Denmark during the team's 2014 FIFA World Cup qualifying campaign; this was his fifth goal for Italy. He was an unused member of Italy's 2014 FIFA World Cup squad, as the Italians suffered a group-stage elimination.

== Style of play ==
Aquilani was a modern, hard-working and versatile playmaker who was capable of functioning in a number of midfield roles, from a holding role as a deep-lying playmaker, to a more advanced trequartista or attacking midfielder. His favoured position was that of an offensive-minded central midfielder or box-to-box midfielder, a position known as the "mezz'ala" role, in Italy, which enabled him to make late attacking runs from behind into the penalty area or create space for team-mates with his movement, despite his lack of notable pace or physicality; he was also used on the wing, or even as a wing-back on occasion. With the Italy national team, he was also deployed in a different role, as a false-attacking midfielder on occasion, under manager Cesare Prandelli. Throughout his career, Aquilani drew praise for his vision, creativity, technique, quick incisive passing, which enabled him to dictate the tempo of his team's plays in midfield, and was also noted for his energy and long-range shooting ability with either foot. Due to his eye for goal, height, and heading accuracy, he was also effective in the air, and was also accurate from set-pieces, which enabled him to contribute to his team's offensive play with additional goals from midfield. Despite his talent in his youth, he was often injury prone throughout his career, which limited his playing time and affected his fitness and consistency, and as a result, he has been accused by some in the sport of not living up to his initial potential.

== Managerial career ==
On 11 July 2019, Aquilani was announced as the head coach of Fiorentina's under-18 team, remaining in that position until December, when he joined the first team staff as an assistant to Giuseppe Iachini. On 19 July 2020, he was appointed as head coach of the Primavera squad. On 26 August 2020, the side successfully defended the Coppa Italia Primavera title, beating Hellas Verona 1–0 in the final.

In 2023, he left Fiorentina's youth system to embark on a career as a first team head coach, taking over at Serie B club Pisa. After guiding Pisa to a mid-table place in the league table, Aquilani parted ways with the club in June 2024.

After a season without a job, in June 2025, Aquilani was appointed in charge of Serie B club Catanzaro, replacing Fabio Caserta.

On 12 June 2026, Aquilani was the head coach of Serie A club Sassuolo. He was sacked on 9 November 2026 due to poor results.

== Personal life ==
Aquilani married Michela Quattrociocche on 4 July 2012. Together, they have two daughters: Aurora (b. 2011) and Diamante (b. 2014). On 11 May 2020, it was announced that the two had separated.

== Career statistics ==
=== Club ===
Appearances and goals by club, season and competition
Club	Season	League			National cup (Note: Includes Coppa Italia, FA Cup, Taça de Portugal, Copa del Rey)		League cup (Note: Includes Football League Cup, Taça da Liga)		Europe		Other		Total	
Club	Season	Division	Apps	Goals	Apps	Goals	Apps	Goals	Apps	Goals	Apps	Goals	Apps	Goals
Roma	2002–03	Serie A	1	0	1	0	–		–		–		2	0
Roma	2004–05	Serie A	29	0	4	0	–		5 (Note: Appearances in UEFA Champions League)	0	–		38	0
Roma	2005–06	Serie A	24	3	4	2	–		8 (Note: Appearances in UEFA Cup)	1	–		36	6
Roma	2006–07	Serie A	13	1	3	0	–		5	0	1 (Note: Appearance in Supercoppa Italiana)	2	22	3
Roma	2007–08	Serie A	21	3	4	1	–		5	0	1	0	31	4
Roma	2008–09	Serie A	14	2	1	0	–		4	0	1	0	20	2
Roma	Total		102	9	17	3	–		27	1	3	2	149	15
Triestina (loan)	2003–04	Serie B	41	4	–		–		–		–		41	4
Liverpool	2009–10	Premier League	18	1	2	0	1	0	5 (Note: Two appearances in UEFA Champions League, three appearances and one goal in UEFA Europa League)	1	–		26	2
Liverpool	2010–11	Premier League	0	0	0	0	0	0	2 (Note: Appearances in UEFA Europa League)	0	–		2	0
Liverpool	Total		18	1	2	0	1	0	7	1	–		28	2
Juventus (loan)	2010–11	Serie A	33	2	1	0	–		0	0	–		34	2
Milan (loan)	2011–12	Serie A	23	1	1	0	–		7	0	0	0	31	1
Fiorentina	2012–13	Serie A	25	7	2	0	–		–		–		27	7
Fiorentina	2013–14	Serie A	31	6	3	0	–		10	1	–		44	7
Fiorentina	2014–15	Serie A	25	0	2	0	–		7	1	–		34	1
Fiorentina	Total		81	13	7	0	–		17	2	–		105	15
Sporting CP	2015–16	Primeira Liga	19	3	2	0	3	1	8 (Note: Two appearances in UEFA Champions League, six appearances and two goals in UEFA Europa League)	1	0	0	32	5
Pescara	2016–17	Serie A	9	1	0	0	–		–		–		9	1
Sassuolo (loan)	2016–17	Serie A	16	0	0	0	–		–		–		16	0
Las Palmas	2017–18	La Liga	21	0	2	0	–		–		–		23	0
Career total			358	33	31	3	4	1	63	4	3	2	459	43

=== International ===
Appearances and goals by national team and year
National team	Year	Apps	Goals
Italy	2006	1	0
Italy	2007	2	0
Italy	2008	7	2
Italy	2009	1	0
Italy	2010	1	0
Italy	2011	9	1
Italy	2012	1	0
Italy	2013	11	2
Italy	2014	5	0
Total		38	5

Scores and results list Italy's goal tally first, score column indicates score after each Aquilani goal.

List of international goals scored by Alberto Aquilani
No.	Date	Venue	Opponent	Score	Result	Competition
1	15 October 2008	Stadio Via del mare, Lecce, Italy	Montenegro	1–0	2–1	2010 FIFA World Cup qualification
2	15 October 2008	Stadio Via del mare, Lecce, Italy	Montenegro	2–1	2–1	2010 FIFA World Cup qualification
3	10 August 2011	Stadio San Nicola, Bari, Italy	Spain	2–1	2–1	Friendly
4	31 May 2013	Stadio Renato Dall'Ara, Bologna, Italy	San Marino	4–0	4–0	Friendly
5	11 October 2013	Parken Stadium, Copenhagen, Denmark	Denmark	2–2	2–2	2014 FIFA World Cup qualification

== Managerial statistics ==
As of match played 7 November 2026

Managerial record by team and tenure
Team	Nat	From	To	Record								Ref
Team	Nat	From	To	G	W	D	L	GF	GA	GD	Win %	Ref
Pisa	(Italy)	1 July 2023	30 June 2024	39	11	13	15	51	55	−4	28.21	
Catanzaro	(Italy)	18 June 2025	11 June 2026	44	18	14	12	70	56	+14	40.91	
Sassuolo	(Italy)	12 June 2026	9 November 2026	13	3	3	7	20	30	−10	23.08	
Total				96	32	30	34	141	141	+0	33.33	—

== Honours ==
=== Player ===
Roma

- Coppa Italia: 2006–07, 2007–08
- Supercoppa Italiana: 2007

Italy U19

- UEFA European Under-19 Championship: 2003

Italy

- FIFA Confederations Cup third place: 2013

Individual

- UEFA European Under-19 Championship Player of the Tournament: 2003
- UEFA European Under-21 Championship Team of the Tournament: 2007

=== Manager ===
Fiorentina Primavera

- Coppa Italia Primavera: 2019–20, 2020–21, 2021–22
- Supercoppa Primavera: 2021, 2022
