= Giordano Meloni =

Italian footballer

Personal information
- Full name: Giordano Meloni
- Date of birth: February 18, 1983 (age 43)
- Place of birth: Rome, Italy
- Height: 1.74 m (5 ft 9 in)
- Position: Forward

Team information
- Current team: Flaminia Civita Castellana

Senior career*
Years	Team	Apps	(Gls)
2002–2005	Cesena	10	(5)
2004	→ Acireale (loan)	14	(3)
2005–2006	San Marino Calcio	14	(1)
2005–2006	Castel San Pietro	12	(4)
2006–2007	Olbia	32	(5)
2007–2008	San Marino Calcio	17	(3)
2008–2009	Celano	16	(1)
2009–	Flaminia Civita Castellana	0	(0)
- * Club domestic league appearances and goals

Giordano Meloni (born 18 February 1983 in Rome, Italy) is an Italian footballer. He plays as a forward. He is currently playing for A.S.D. Flaminia Civita Castellana.

== See also ==
- Football in Italy
- List of football clubs in Italy
