= Akande Ajide =

Nigerian footballer (born 1985)

Personal information
- Full name: Olasunkanmi Akande Ajide
- Date of birth: 24 December 1985 (age 40)
- Place of birth: Lagos, Nigeria
- Height: 1.70 m (5 ft 7 in)
- Position: Midfielder

Youth career
- Reggiana
- 2002: → Milan (loan)
- 2002–2003: Roma

Senior career*
Years	Team	Apps	(Gls)
2003–2005	Roma	1	(0)
2004	→ Venezia (loan)	5	(0)
2005	→ Fidelis Andria (loan)	14	(0)
2005–2007	Bellinzona	47	(13)
2007–2009	Locarno	36	(0)
2011–2012	Mendrisio	19	(3)
Total		122	(16)
- * Club domestic league appearances and goals

Olasunkanmi Akande Ajide (born 24 December 1985) is a Nigerian retired footballer who played as a midfielder. He spent the majority of his career playing in Italy and Switzerland.

== Career ==
=== Italy ===
He started his European career at Reggiana, along with Isah Eliakwu, Obafemi Martins and Adewale Wahab. He was loaned to AC Milan's youth team for the 2001–02 season and won the 2002 Torneo Città di Arco. He then joined AS Roma along with Wahab in summer 2002, signed a 3-year contract. He spent his first two seasons with youth team and Primavera team, then spent on loan to Italian lower division, for Venezia and Fidelis Andria. He contract was then extended to 2007.

=== Switzerland ===
In summer 2005, he left for Swiss side AC Bellinzona on free transfer, located in Italian speaking region Ticino. He scored 6 goals in 1st season. In October 2007, he joined FC Locarno, also at Swiss Challenge League and Ticino.
