= Juárez (footballer) =

Brazilian footballer

Personal information
- Full name: Juárez de Souza Teixeira
- Date of birth: 25 September 1973 (age 53)
- Place of birth: São Paulo, Brazil
- Height: 1.83 m (6 ft 0 in)
- Position: Central defender

Senior career*
Years	Team	Apps	(Gls)
1992–1993	Portuguesa de Desportos	1	(0)
1994	Yverdon	18	(0)
1994–1999	Servette	141	(6)
1999–2002	Lecce	78	(0)
2002–2003	Como	22	(0)
2003–2005	Bologna	43	(0)
2004	→ Siena (loan)	13	(0)
2005–2006	Udinese	5	(0)
Total		321	(6)

International career
?–1993	Brazil U20		
- * Club domestic league appearances and goals

Juárez de Souza Teixeira (born 25 September 1973) is a former Brazilian footballer.

In the 2005–06 season, he joined Udinese on free transfer. In the first month for Udinese, he suffered from injury.

He played 3 matches at UEFA Champions League Group Stage, as Cesare Natali and Felipe's backup. He also played once at UEFA Cup.

At international level he capped for Brazil U20 at 1993 FIFA World Youth Championship.
