= Giuseppe Scurto =

Italian footballer (born 1984)

Personal information
- Date of birth: 5 January 1984 (age 42)
- Place of birth: Alcamo, Italy
- Height: 1.90 m (6 ft 3 in)
- Position: Centre back

Team information
- Current team: Torino Primavera (coach)

Youth career
- Sampdoria
- 2002–2003: Roma

Senior career*
Years	Team	Apps	(Gls)
2003–2005	Roma	9	(0)
2005–2007	Chievo	24	(1)
2007–2009	Treviso	68	(1)
2009–2011	Triestina	41	(1)
2012–2013	Juve Stabia	0	(0)

International career
2000	Italy U15	9	(0)
2002	Italy U18	2	(0)
2002–2003	Italy U19	4	(0)
2005–2006	Italy U20	4	(0)
2006–2007	Italy U21	2	(0)
- * Club domestic league appearances and goals

Giuseppe Scurto (born 5 January 1984) is an Italian former football player and current coach who played as a defender. He is in charge of Torino Primavera.

== Club career ==
Scurto made his Serie A debut with AS Roma on 7 November 2004, in a 1–1 away draw against AC Milan. He joined Chievo in 2005 for €250,000 and Chievo bought the remain 50% rights for €100,000 on 20 June 2007. However, in July Scurto was sold to Treviso for about €1.7 million. In 2009, he moved to Triestina. In June 2011 he terminated his contract with Triestina, but under FIGC rule, he would effectively become a free agent in winter window.

He retired in 2012 after a short-lived stint at Juve Stabia due to persistent physical issues.

== International career ==
Scurto was capped for Italy at every youth level, and was called up to 2006 UEFA European Under-21 Championship.

== Coaching career ==
Following his early retirement, Scurto was offered a coaching role as head of the Berretti Under-19 team at Juve Stabia, which he accepted; he then left Juve Stabia in July 2013 to accept an offer as head of the Allievi Nazionali Under-17 team at Palermo.

In July 2017 he was promoted as head of the Primavera Under-19 team, with whom he won the inaugural season of both the Campionato Primavera 2 and the Supercoppa Primavera 2. On his first season in charge of the club at the Campionato Primavera 1 level, he managed to keep Palermo in the top flight; he left the club by the end of the season after his contract expired.

On 15 July 2019, he was announced as new Primavera coach of Trapani. He left Trapani in August 2020 to move to SPAL as their new Primavera coach. After one season at SPAL, Scurto then agreed to return to Roma as their new Under-18 youth coach.

In June 2022, Scurto left Roma to sign for Torino as the new coach in charge of the Torino Primavera youth team.

== Honours ==
=== Player ===
Italy U19

- UEFA European Under-19 Championship: 2003

=== Manager ===
Palermo

- Supercoppa Primavera 2: 2018
- Campionato Primavera 2: 2018
