= Carlo Zotti =

Italian footballer (born 1982)

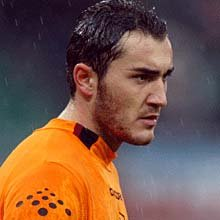

Personal information
- Date of birth: 3 September 1982 (age 44)
- Place of birth: Benevento, Italy
- Height: 1.90 m (6 ft 3 in)
- Position: Goalkeeper

Youth career
- Roma

Senior career*
Years	Team	Apps	(Gls)
2002–2008	Roma	14	(0)
2005–2006	→ Ascoli (loan)	0	(0)
2007–2008	→ Sampdoria (loan)	1	(0)
2008	Cittadella	12	(0)
2009–2011	Bellinzona	13	(0)
2012	Losone Sportiva		
2012–2014	FC Wil	17	(0)
2015	FC Locarno	0	(0)
Total		57	(0)

International career
1999	Italy U17	1	(0)
2000–2001	Italy U18	5	(0)
2004	Italy U21	2	(0)
Medal record
Men's football
Representing Italy
UEFA European Under-21 Championship
Winner	2004 Germany
- * Club domestic league appearances and goals

Carlo Zotti (born 3 September 1982) is an Italian former professional footballer who played as a goalkeeper.

== Club career ==
Zotti was born in Foglianise, Benevento. He started his career at AS Roma, but his first-team experience was limited due to the presence of experienced goalkeepers Francesco Antonioli, Ivan Pelizzoli and Cristiano Lupatelli. He also had to compete with other young keepers such as Gianluca Curci. In 2004, he signed a five-year contract with Roma. In 2005, he was loaned to Ascoli Calcio 1898 to seek first team football.

He was back at Roma in the summer of 2006, but because Roma signed Julio Sergio Bertagnoli, Zotti became the 4th choice goalkeeper. Loaning him out proved a difficult task, so Zotti played for the Primavera side in the 2006–07 season. Due to this, he was finally sent on loan to UC Sampdoria in January 2007.

Zotti signed for Serie B team AS Cittadella in 2008, which Zotti terminated the contract with Roma by mutual consent, he joined than on 28 January 2009 to AC Bellinzona.

Zotti joined in 2012. In September, during a 3–2 away against FC Winterthur, he was substituted off due to an injury.

== International career ==
Zotti was in the Italy U21 squad that won the 2004 European Under-21 Football Championship, but was an unused sub.
