= Ivan Pelizzoli =

Italian footballer

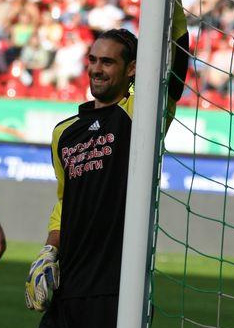
- Pelizzoli while playing for Lokomotiv Moscow

Personal information
- Date of birth: 18 November 1980 (age 45)
- Place of birth: Bergamo, Italy
- Height: 1.97 m (6 ft 6 in)
- Position: Goalkeeper

Youth career
- 1997–1999: Atalanta

Senior career*
| Years | Team | Apps | (Gls) |
| 1999–2001 | Atalanta | 30 | (0) |
| 1999–2000 | → Triestina (loan) | 23 | (0) |
| 2001–2005 | Roma | 73 | (0) |
| 2005–2007 | Reggina | 41 | (0) |
| 2007–2010 | Lokomotiv Moscow | 20 | (0) |
| 2009–2010 | → AlbinoLeffe (loan) | 23 | (0) |
| 2010–2011 | Cagliari | 1 | (0) |
| 2011–2012 | Padova | 18 | (0) |
| 2012–2014 | Pescara | 31 | (0) |
| 2014–2016 | Virtus Entella | 11 | (0) |
| 2016 | Vicenza | 1 | (0) |
| 2016–2017 | Piacenza | 10 | (0) |
| 2017 | Foggia | 0 | (0) |

International career
| 1998 | Italy U17 | 1 | (0) |
| 2000–2002 | Italy U21 | 11 | (0) |
| 2004 | Italy Olympic | 6 | (0) |
| 2003–2004 | Italy | 2 | (0) |
Medal record
Representing Italy
Men's Football
Summer Olympics
| Bronze medal – third place | 2004 Athens | Team competition |
- * Club domestic league appearances and goals

Ivan Pelizzoli (Italian pronunciation: [ˈiːvam pelitˈtsɔːli]; born 18 November 1980) is an Italian former professional footballer who played as a goalkeeper.

== Club career ==
=== Early career ===
After playing for Atalanta and Triestina from 1997 to 2000, he made his Serie A debut with Atalanta on 5 November 2000, during the 2000–01 season; the promising goalkeeper soon emerged to prominence, overtaking Alberto Fontana and Davide Pinato as the club's starting goalkeeper, and was initially considered by the media to be one of the best young goalkeepers in Italy.

=== Roma ===
In the following summer he was signed by 2001 Italian champions Roma for 33 billion lire in 5-year contract, worth 3,372.2 million lire per season, (signed in June 2001; about €17,043,078 transfer fee and €1.742 million wage; paid via 27,000 million lire cash and Alessandro Rinaldi), winning the Supercoppa Italiana in his first season. He was initially a backup to Francesco Antonioli, but midway through the 2002–03 Serie A season, he became the club's first choice goalkeeper under Fabio Capello, helping Roma to reach the 2003 Coppa Italia final. During the 2003–04 Serie A season, Pelizzoli conceded the fewest goals in the entire Serie A behind a defensive force which consisted mainly of Christian Panucci, Walter Samuel, Cristian Chivu and Vincent Candela, as Roma finished the season in second place; during the season, he also managed what is currently the 5th longest consecutive run without conceding a goal in Serie A, setting a 774-minute unbeaten streak. Despite his performances, he was not picked for the Euro 2004 (although he was included in the Italian Olympic squad instead, helping the team to a bronze medal), but looked set to become a long-term first choice in Roma. However, his subsequent unstable performances gave Gianluca Curci and Carlo Zotti the chance to play during the 2004–05 Serie A season.

=== Reggina ===
Due to his lack of competitive action, he signed for Reggina in 2005 in a co-ownership deal for a peppercorn fee of €500 to compete with Nicola Pavarini for the role of the team's first choice goalkeeper. Reggina pinned their hopes on Pelizzoli regaining his spectacular form from the 2003–04 season, but he could not really find his feet in Reggina, though he played his part in keeping the team in the top-flight division. In June 2006 Roma gave up the remain 50% registration rights to Reggina for free.

=== Lokomotiv Moscow ===
On 31 January 2007, Pelizzoli was captured by Lokomotiv Moscow, signing him on with a three-year contract. In his first season, he competed for a first team place with Eldin Jakupović, and in his second season with Ivan Levenets and Marek Čech, demoting him to the 4th choice goalkeeper.

=== AlbinoLeffe ===
On 31 August 2009, Lokomotiv Moscow loaned Pelizzoli to the Serie B club AlbinoLeffe for one season, with Eldin Jakupović returning to Moscow. Pelizzoli was brought in as AlbinoLeffe's goalkeepers only had Serie C1 experience, namely Stefano Layeni, Daniel Offredi and Paolo Branduani. He made his team debut on 19 September 2009. After playing three games in September, he was out-favored and lost his place in both first choice and on the bench. Pelizzoli regained his regular place since November.

=== Cagliari ===
In August 2010, Pelizzoli joined Cagliari. He hinted he would take on an understudy role in the Sardinian club.

=== Pescara ===
In August 2012, Pescara acquired Pelizzoli as a back-up to Mattia Perin.

=== Vicenza ===
On 30 March 2016, Pelizzoli joined Vicenza in a short-term contract.

=== Piacenza ===
On 24 November 2016, he signed a contract with Piacenza. He left the team in 2017.

=== Foggia ===
On 14 July 2017, Pelizzoli signed a contract with Foggia. He left the club again at the end of 2017 without having made an appearance.

== International career ==
At youth international level, Pelizzoli played for the Italy under-21 side at the 2002 UEFA European Under-21 Championship, ahead of Generoso Rossi and Vitangelo Spadavecchia as first choice, where Italy reached the semi-finals, losing out 3–2 to the eventual champions Czech Republic.

He made his senior international debut with Italy in 2003, making 2 caps in total between 2003 and 2004. His first senior cap came under manager Giovanni Trapattoni on 30 April 2003, in a 2–1 friendly win over Switzerland in Geneva, with Pelizzoli coming on as a substitute for fellow debutant Christian Abbiati in the 83rd minute. His second and final cap came on 17 November 2004, under manager Marcello Lippi, in a 1–0 friendly win over Finland in Messina.

Although he was not included in Italy's Euro 2004 squad, with Angelo Peruzzi taking his place as the team's third-choice goalkeeper due to Trapattoni's concerns over Pelizzoli's fitness-levels following several injury struggles, Pelizzoli was later one of three over-age players representing Italy at the 2004 Summer Olympics under manager Claudio Gentile, ahead of Marco Amelia, as first choice goalkeeper, winning a Bronze medal, after losing 3–0 to eventual champions Argentina in the semi-final, and beating Iraq 1–0 in the bronze medal match. During the tournament, he saved two penalties, including one in Italy's 1–0 extra-time victory over Mali in the quarter-finals, with Pelizzoli stopping Mohamed Sissoko's spot kick.

== Style of play ==
Pelizzoli was initially considered by pundits to be one of the most promising Italian goalkeepers of his generation, and even as potential rival to Gianluigi Buffon in Italy's starting line-up. He was noted for his large stature (standing at 1.97m) and exceptional physical qualities, as well as his shot-stopping ability and reflexes, which allowed him to produce spectacular saves, and made him effective at stopping penalties. However, he failed to live up to his potential as his career progressed, suffering a significant decline in his performances after the mid-2000s, following a series of error-prone performances that saw him lose his place in Roma's starting line-up; his tendency to pick-injuries are also thought to have affected his performances.

== Career statistics ==
=== International ===
International appearances and goals
| # | Date | Venue | Opponent | Result | Goal | Competition |
|---|---|---|---|---|---|---|
| 1. | 30 April 2003 | Geneva, Switzerland | Switzerland | 2–1 | 0 | Friendly |
| 1. | 12 August 2004 | Volos, Greece | Ghana | 2–2 | 0 | 2004 Olympics (Italy U23) |
| 2. | 15 August 2004 | Volos, Greece | Japan | 3–2 | 0 | 2004 Olympics (Italy U23) |
| 3. | 18 August 2004 | Piraeus, Greece | Paraguay | 0–1 | 0 | 2004 Olympics (Italy U23) |
| 4. | 21 August 2004 | Piraeus, Greece | Mali | 1–0 (AET) | 0 | 2004 Olympics (Italy U23) |
| 5. | 24 August 2004 | Piraeus, Greece | Argentina | 0–3 | 0 | 2004 Olympics (Italy U23) |
| 6. | 27 August 2004 | Thessaloniki, Greece | Iraq | 1–0 | 0 | 2004 Olympics (Italy U23) |
| 2. | 17 November 2004 | Messina, Italy | Finland | 1–0 | 0 | Friendly |

== Honours ==
=== Club ===
Roma

- Supercoppa Italiana: 2001

Lokomotiv Moscow

- Russian Cup: 2006–07
