= Adewale Wahab =

Nigerian footballer

Personal information
- Full name: Adewale Dauda Wahab
- Date of birth: 4 October 1984 (age 42)
- Place of birth: Port Harcourt, Nigeria
- Height: 1.80 m (5 ft 11 in)
- Position: Midfielder

Youth career
- –2001: Reggiana
- 2001: → Bologna (loan)
- 2001–2004: Roma
- 2002–2003: → Reggiana (loan)

Senior career*
Years	Team	Apps	(Gls)
2000–2001	Reggiana	2	(0)
2001–2007	Roma	1	(0)
2004–2005	→ Ternana (loan)	10	(1)
2005–2006	→ Teramo (loan)	9	(0)
2006–2007	→ Catanzaro (loan)	30	(1)
2007–2011	Bellinzona	53	(0)

International career
2004	Nigeria	1	(0)
- * Club domestic league appearances and goals

Adewale Dauda Wahab (born 4 October 1984) is a Nigerian former footballer who played as a midfielder.

== Career ==
=== Roma ===
Wahab started his European career with Italian club Reggiana, along with Obafemi Martins and other Nigerian players. Both players were signed by Italian giants Roma in July 2001, for 3 billion lire, while Giuseppe Di Masi moved in the opposite direction for 2.5 billion lire on a co-ownership deal. Wahab was loaned back to Reggiana in the 2002–03 season. He was promoted to Roma's first team in the 2003–04 season, playing once in Serie A and once in the 2003–04 UEFA Cup, when he substituted Daniele De Rossi against Macedonian club Vardar. Wahab also played for Bologna in the 2001 Torneo Città di Arco.

He then spent three seasons loaned to clubs in the Italian lower divisions. Although he was loaned to other clubs, in 2006 his contract was extended from 2007 to 2009.

=== Bellinzona ===
In summer 2007, Wahab was signed by AC Bellinzona. In the 2009–10 season, he went to SE Eivissa-Ibiza and played a few friendlies. However, the transfer collapsed after the club was expelled from the league and re-admitted as the new club UD Ibiza-Eivissa in the regional league.

Wahab then played two league matches for Bellinzona, in October and November. In January 2010, he was dropped from the squad, but was later re-included in the team's official roster for the 2010–11 season.
