= Matteo Trefoloni =

Italian football referee

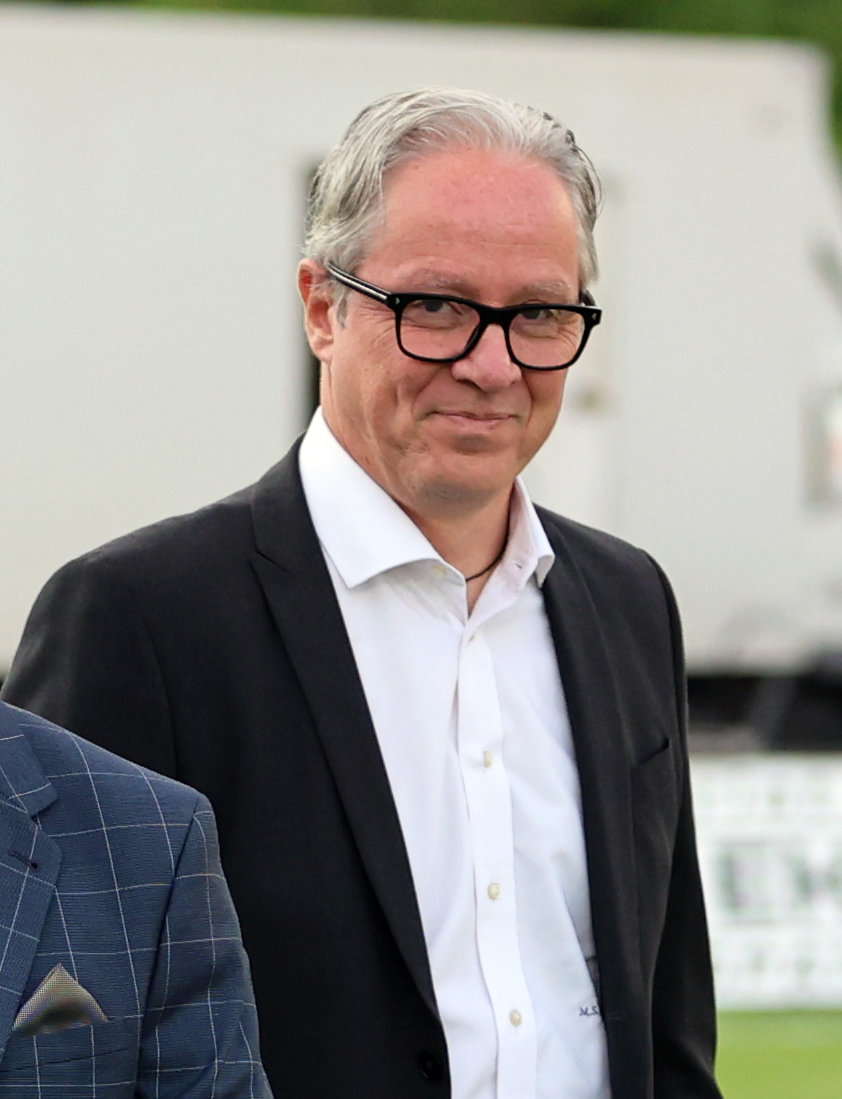
Matteo Trefoloni in 2026

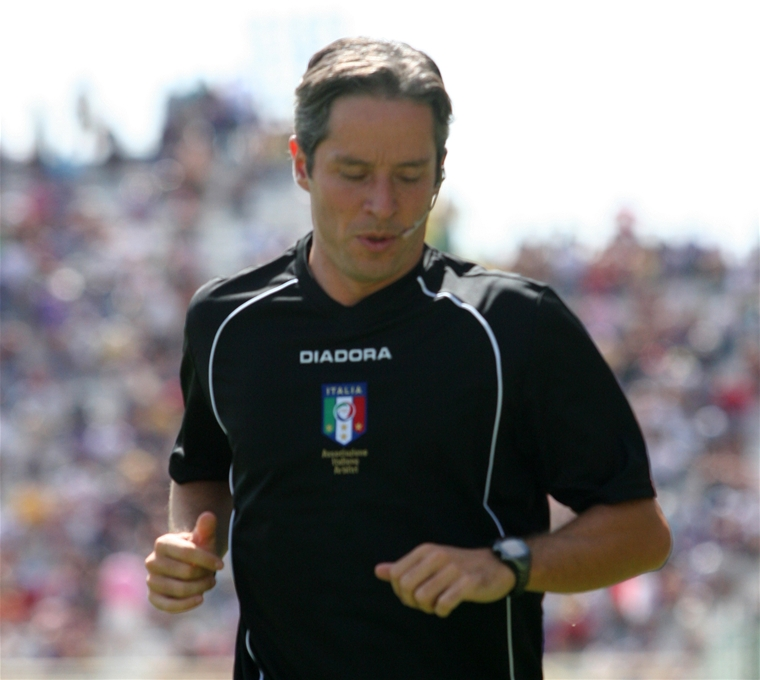

Matteo Simone Trefoloni (born 31 March 1971) is an Italian former Italian football referee, who refereed many UEFA matches over the years.

Chairman of the Referee Committee of the Bulgarian Football Union (BFU).

He sent Rangers goalkeeper Allan McGregor off in a UEFA Cup against Hapoel Tel Aviv played in February 2007. Trefoloni returned to Scotland on 17 September 2008 to take charge of the match between Celtic and Aalborg in the UEFA Champions League.
