= 2003–04 AS Roma season =

Roma
2003–04 season
- President: Franco Sensi
- Manager: Fabio Capello
- Stadium: Stadio Olimpico
- Serie A: 2nd
- Coppa Italia: Quarter-finals
- UEFA Cup: Fourth round
- Top goalscorer: League: Francesco Totti (20); All: Francesco Totti (20)
- Average home league attendance: 55,413
Home colours	Away colours	Third colours

Associazione Sportiva Roma had a tremendous season in the league, scoring most goals and conceding the fewest goals of all teams, but despite this, AC Milan were able to run away with the title, due to a greater efficiency in winning their matches.

In Fabio Capello's last season as Roma's coach, the squad did not manage to win any titles whatsoever, even though the results showed a resurgence from the anticlimactic 2002–03 season, in which Roma dipped to eighth in the league standings.

Financial worries forced the club to sell Emerson to Juventus and Walter Samuel to Real Madrid following the season's end. Capello controversially signed for Juventus as well, but key players such as Francesco Totti, Antonio Cassano and Cristian Chivu remained.

== Players ==
=== Squad information ===
Last updated on 16 May 2004
Appearances include league matches only

No.	Name	Nat	Position(s)	Date of birth (Age at end of season)	Signed from	Signed in	Apps.	Goals
Goalkeepers
1	Cristiano Lupatelli	(Italy)	GK	21 June 1978 (aged 26)	(Italy) Chievo	2003	0	0
12	Carlo Zotti	(Italy)	GK	3 September 1982 (aged 21)	(Italy) Palermo	2001	4	0
22	Ivan Pelizzoli	(Italy)	GK	18 November 1980 (aged 23)	(Italy) Atalanta	2001	55	0
Defenders
2	Christian Panucci (Vice-Captain)	(Italy)	RB / CB	12 April 1973 (aged 31)	(France) Monaco	2001	84	4
4	Cristian Chivu	(Romania)	LB / CB	26 October 1980 (aged 23)	(Netherlands) Ajax	2003	22	2
5	Jonathan Zebina	(France)	CB / RB	19 July 1978 (aged 25)	(Italy) Cagliari	2000	88	1
19	Walter Samuel	(Argentina)	CB	23 March 1978 (aged 26)	(Argentina) Boca Juniors	2000	122	9
26	Gianluca Galasso	(Italy)	CB	18 January 1984 (aged 20)	(Italy) Youth Sector	2003	1	0
29	Giuseppe Scurto	(Italy)	CB	5 January 1984 (aged 20)	(Italy) Youth Sector	2004	0	0
31	Traianos Dellas	(Greece)	CB	31 January 1976 (aged 28)	(Italy) Perugia	2002	24	1
32	Vincent Candela	(France)	LB / LWB	24 October 1973 (aged 30)	(France) Guingamp	1997	202	14
Midfielders
8	Francisco Lima	(Brazil)	DM / CM	17 April 1971 (aged 33)	(Italy) Bologna	2001	88	0
11	Emerson	(Brazil)	DM / CM	4 April 1976 (aged 28)	(Germany) Bayer Leverkusen	2000	105	13
15	Olivier Dacourt	(France)	AM / CM	25 September 1974 (aged 29)	(England) Leeds United	2003	45	1
17	Damiano Tommasi	(Italy)	DM / CM	17 May 1974 (aged 30)	(Italy) Hellas Verona	1996	236	12
21	Gaetano D'Agostino	(Italy)	CM / AM	3 June 1982 (aged 22)	(Italy) Bari	2003	16	0
27	Daniele De Rossi	(Italy)	DM / CM	24 July 1983 (aged 20)	(Italy) Youth Sector	2001	21	2
28	Adewale Wahab	(Nigeria)	CM	4 October 1984 (aged 19)	(Italy) Reggiana	2001	1	0
30	Mancini	(Brazil)	LW / RW / AM	1 August 1980 (aged 23)	(Italy) Venezia	2003	33	8
33	Akande Ajide	(Nigeria)	CM	24 December 1985 (aged 18)	(Italy) Youth Sector	2004	1	0
37	Raffaele De Martino	(Italy)	CM	8 April 1986 (aged 18)	(Italy) Youth Sector	2003	0	0
Forwards
9	Vincenzo Montella	(Italy)	CF / ST	18 June 1974 (aged 30)	(Italy) Sampdoria	1999	118	58
10	Francesco Totti (Captain)	(Italy)	AM / LW / SS / CF / ST	27 September 1976 (aged 27)	(Italy) Youth Sector	1992	272	86
18	Antonio Cassano	(Italy)	ST / SS	12 July 1982 (aged 21)	(Italy) Bari	2001	82	28
23	John Carew	(Norway)	CF / ST	5 September 1979 (aged 24)	(Spain) Valencia	2003	20	6
24	Marco Delvecchio	(Italy)	CF / ST	7 April 1973 (aged 31)	(Italy) Internazionale	1995	227	62
25	Alessio Cerci	(Italy)	RW / SS	23 July 1987 (aged 16)	(Italy) Youth Sector	2003	1	0
34	Daniele Corvia	(Italy)	CF / ST	22 November 1984 (aged 19)	(Italy) Youth Sector	2003	3	0
Players transferred during the season
20	Luigi Sartor	(Italy)	LB / RB / CB	30 January 1975 (aged 29)	(Italy) Parma	2002	12	0

=== Transfers ===
In
Pos.	Name	from	Type
DF	Cristian Chivu	Ajax	
MF	Olivier Dacourt	Leeds United	
FW	John Carew	Valencia CF	loan
MF	Amantino Mancini	Venezia FC	end of contract
MF	Adewale Dauda Wahab	AC Reggiana	-
FW	Denis Boshnjaku	SS Lazio	-

Out
Pos.	Name	To	Type
FW	Denis Boshnjaku	Teramo	-
DF	Aldair	Genoa CFC	
DF	Cafu	AC Milan	end of contract
GK	Francesco Antonioli	Sampdoria	end of contract
DF	Leandro Cufré	Siena	loan
MF	Gianni Guigou	Siena	loan
MF	Diego Fuser	Torino	end of contract
MF	Alberto Aquilani	Triestina	loan
FW	Gabriel Batistuta	Al-Arabi	end of contract
MF	Davide Bombardini	Salernitana	-
DF	Damiano Ferronetti	Triestina	loan

==== Winter ====
In
Pos.	Name	To	Type
-	-	-	-

Out
Pos.	Name	To	Type
DF	Luigi Sartor	AC Ancona	loan

== Competitions ==
=== Overall ===
Competition	Started round	Final position	First match	Last match
Serie A	Matchday 1	Runners-up	31 August 2003	16 May 2004
Coppa Italia	Round of 16	Quarter-finals	4 December 2003	22 January 2004
UEFA Cup	First round	Fourth round	24 September 2003	8 December 2004

Last updated: 16 May 2004

=== Serie A ===
==== League table ====
Pos	Team	Pld	W	D	L	GF	GA	GD	Pts	Qualification or relegation
1	Milan (C)	34	25	7	2	65	24	+41	82	Qualification to Champions League group stage
2	Roma	34	21	8	5	68	19	+49	71	Qualification to Champions League group stage
3	Juventus	34	21	6	7	67	42	+25	69	Qualification to Champions League third qualifying round
4	Internazionale	34	17	8	9	59	37	+22	59	Qualification to Champions League third qualifying round
5	Parma	34	16	10	8	57	46	+11	58	Qualification to UEFA Cup first round

Source: Almanacco Illustrato del Calcio – La Storia 1898-2004, Panini Edizioni, Modena, September 2005
Rules for classification: 1) points; 2) tiebreaker for relevant positions 3) head-to-head points and goal difference; 4) head-to-head goals scored; 5) goal difference; 6) number of goals scored.
(C) Champions

==== Results summary ====
Overall								Home						Away					
Pld	W	D	L	GF	GA	GD	Pts	W	D	L	GF	GA	GD	W	D	L	GF	GA	GD
34	21	8	5	68	19	+49	71	13	1	3	45	12	+33	8	7	2	23	7	+16

Last updated: 16 May 2004.
Source: Competitive matches

==== Results by round ====
Round	1	2	3	4	5	6	7	8	9	10	11	12	13	14	15	16	17	18	19	20	21	22	23	24	25	26	27	28	29	30	31	32	33	34
Ground	A	H	A	H	A	A	H	A	H	A	H	A	H	A	H	A	H	H	A	H	A	H	A	H	A	A	H	A	H	A	H	A	H	A
Result	W	W	D	W	D	W	D	W	W	W	W	W	W	W	L	W	W	D	L	W	D	W	W	W	D	L	W	W	W	D	W	L	L	D
Position	5	1	1	1	3	3	3	3	2	2	1	1	1	1	1	1	1	2	2	2	2	2	2	2	2	3	2	2	2	2	2	2	2	2

Source: Competitive matches
A = Away; H = Home; W = Win; D = Draw; L = Loss; P = Postponed; = Leader, UEFA Champions League Groups stage; = UEFA Champions League Groups stage; = UEFA Champions League Qualifying round; = 2004–05 UEFA Cup; = 2004–05 Serie B

==== Matches ====
31 August 2003 1	Udinese	1–2	Roma	Udine
15:00 CEST (UTC+02:00)	Krøldrup 26'	Report	Delvecchio 13'; Montella 70'	Stadium: Stadio Friuli; Attendance: 17,054; Referee: Matteo Trefoloni

14 September 2003 2	Roma	5–0	Brescia	Rome
15:00 CEST (UTC+02:00)	Montella 11'; Chivu 16'; Totti 23', 58'; Carew 88' (pen.)	Report		Stadium: Stadio Olimpico; Attendance: 49,931; Referee: Tiziano Pieri

21 September 2003 3	Juventus	2–2	Roma	Turin
20:30 CEST (UTC+02:00)	Di Vaio 21', 35'	Report	Chivu 25'; Zebina 87'	Stadium: Stadio delle Alpi; Attendance: 43,042; Referee: Emilio Pellegrino

28 September 2003 4	Roma	3–0	Ancona	Rome
15:00 CEST (UTC+02:00)	Montella 48'; Totti 78'; Delvecchio 86'	Report		Stadium: Stadio Olimpico; Attendance: 51,150; Referee: Cosimo Bolognino

5 October 2003 5	Siena	0–0	Roma	Siena
15:00 CEST (UTC+02:00)		Report		Stadium: Stadio Artemio Franchi – Montepaschi Arena; Attendance: 13,310; Referee: Roberto Rosetti

19 October 2003 6	Roma	2–0	Parma	Rome
15:00 CEST (UTC+02:00)	Samuel 28'; Cassano 61'	Report		Stadium: Stadio Olimpico; Attendance: 54,531; Referee: Pierluigi Collina

26 October 2003 7	Internazionale	0–0	Roma	Milan
20:30 CET (UTC+01:00)		Report		Stadium: San Siro; Attendance: 68,641; Referee: Pierluigi Collina

2 November 2003 8	Roma	2–0	Reggina	Rome
15:00 CET (UTC+01:00)	Montella 17'; Carew 81'	Report		Stadium: Stadio Olimpico; Attendance: 52,050; Referee: Emilio Pellegrino

9 November 2003 9	Roma	2–0	Lazio	Rome
20:30 CET (UTC+01:00)	Mancini 81'; Emerson 86'	Report		Stadium: Stadio Olimpico; Attendance: 72,844; Referee: Matteo Trefoloni

23 November 2003 10	Bologna	0–4	Roma	Bologna
15:00 CET (UTC+01:00)		Report	Totti 16'; Montella 34'; Panucci 38'; Cassano 49'	Stadium: Stadio Renato Dall'Ara; Attendance: 27,495; Referee: Pierluigi Collina

30 November 2003 11	Roma	3–1	Lecce	Rome
15:00 CET (UTC+01:00)	Mancini 18'; Carew 45'; Totti 77'	Report	Chevantón 89'	Stadium: Stadio Olimpico; Attendance: 51,619; Referee: Paolo Dondarini

7 December 2003 12	Chievo	0–3	Roma	Verona
20:30 CET (UTC+01:00)		Report	Totti 67'; Mancini 70'; Cassano 72'	Stadium: Stadio Marc'Antonio Bentegodi; Attendance: 19,023; Referee: Paolo Bertini

14 December 2003 13	Roma	1–0	Modena	Rome
20:30 CET (UTC+01:00)	Totti 8' (pen.)	Report		Stadium: Stadio Olimpico; Attendance: 47,046; Referee: Domenico Messina

20 December 2003 14	Empoli	0–2	Roma	Empoli
20:30 CET (UTC+01:00)		Report	Totti 23' (pen.), 45+1'	Stadium: Stadio Carlo Castellani; Attendance: 12,224; Referee: Tiziano Pieri

6 January 2004 15	Roma	1–2	Milan	Rome
20:30 CET (UTC+01:00)	Cassano 45+3'	Report	Shevchenko 24', 63'	Stadium: Stadio Olimpico; Attendance: 73,383; Referee: Gianluca Paparesta

11 January 2004 16	Perugia	0–1	Roma	Perugia
15:00 CET (UTC+01:00)		Report	Mancini 3'	Stadium: Stadio Renato Curi; Attendance: 18,796; Referee: Daniele Tombolini

18 January 2004 17	Roma	3–1	Sampdoria	Rome
15:00 CET (UTC+01:00)	Carew 10'; Totti 60', 67'	Report	Bazzani 6'	Stadium: Stadio Olimpico; Attendance: 51,813; Referee: Nicola Ayroldi

25 January 2004 18	Roma	1–1	Udinese	Rome
15:00 CET (UTC+01:00)	Panucci 15'	Report	Jankulovski 88'	Stadium: Stadio Olimpico; Attendance: 44,882; Referee: Matteo Trefoloni

31 January 2004 19	Brescia	1–0	Roma	Brescia
20:30 CET (UTC+01:00)	Bachini 43' (pen.)	Report		Stadium: Stadio Mario Rigamonti; Attendance: 15,005; Referee: Cosimo Bolognino

8 February 2004 20	Roma	4–0	Juventus	Rome
20:30 CET (UTC+01:00)	Dacourt 13'; Totti 53' (pen.); Cassano 70', 85'	Report		Stadium: Stadio Olimpico; Attendance: 73,325; Referee: Pierluigi Collina

15 February 2004 21	Ancona	0–0	Roma	Ancona
15:00 CET (UTC+01:00)		Report		Stadium: Stadio del Conero; Attendance: 20,850; Referee: Gianluca Paparesta

22 February 2004 22	Roma	6–0	Siena	Rome
15:00 CET (UTC+01:00)	Cassano 19', 24', 70'; Mancini 30'; Delvecchio 81'; Totti 86'	Report		Stadium: Stadio Olimpico; Attendance: 49,579; Referee: Pierluigi Collina

29 February 2004 23	Parma	1–4	Roma	Parma
15:00 CET (UTC+01:00)	Gilardino 30'	Report	Cassano 44'; Emerson 52'; Totti 70'; Mancini 77'	Stadium: Stadio Ennio Tardini; Attendance: 19,031; Referee: Pierluigi Collina

7 March 2004 24	Roma	4–1	Internazionale	Rome
20:30 CET (UTC+01:00)	Cassano 45'; Mancini 63', 90+4'; Totti 89' (pen.)	Report	Vieri 73'	Stadium: Stadio Olimpico; Attendance: 59,508; Referee: Roberto Rosetti

14 March 2004 25	Reggina	0–0	Roma	Reggio Calabria
15:00 CET (UTC+01:00)		Report		Stadium: Stadio Oreste Granillo; Attendance: 21,286; Referee: Gianluca Paparesta

28 March 2004 27	Roma	1–2	Bologna	Rome
15:00 CEST (UTC+02:00)	Cassano 33'	Report	Pecchia 26'; Tare 78'	Stadium: Stadio Olimpico; Attendance: 44,123; Referee: Paolo Bertini

4 April 2004 28	Lecce	0–3	Roma	Lecce
15:00 CEST (UTC+02:00)		Report	Emerson 50'; D'Agostino 54'; Totti 90+4' (pen.)	Stadium: Stadio Via del Mare; Attendance: 16,266; Referee: Matteo Trefoloni

10 April 2004 29	Roma	3–1	Chievo	Palermo
15:00 CEST (UTC+02:00)	Carew 29'; Cassano 60'; Frezzolini 77' (o.g.)	Report	Cossato 32'	Stadium: Stadio Renzo Barbera; Attendance: 6,000; Referee: Daniele Tombolini

18 April 2004 30	Modena	0–1	Roma	Modena
20:30 CEST (UTC+02:00)		Report	Totti 55'	Stadium: Stadio Alberto Braglia; Attendance: 15,690; Referee: Emilio Pellegrino

21 April 2004 26	Lazio	1–1	Roma	Rome
18:00 CEST (UTC+02:00)	Corradi 40'	Report	Totti 61' (pen.)	Stadium: Stadio Olimpico; Attendance: 51,590; Referee: Roberto Rosetti

25 April 2004 31	Roma	3–0	Empoli	Palermo
15:00 CEST (UTC+02:00)	Totti 41', 89'; Carew 65'	Report		Stadium: Stadio Renzo Barbera; Attendance: 4,000; Referee: Salvatore Racalbuto

2 May 2004 32	Milan	1–0	Roma	Milan
15:00 CEST (UTC+02:00)	Shevchenko 2'	Report		Stadium: San Siro; Attendance: 76,911; Referee: Domenico Messina

9 May 2004 33	Roma	1–3	Perugia	Palermo
15:00 CEST (UTC+02:00)	Cassano 12'	Report	Zé Maria 19', 24' (pen.); Ravanelli 83'	Stadium: Stadio Renzo Barbera; Attendance: 4,000; Referee: Cosimo Bolognino

16 May 2004 34	Sampdoria	0–0	Roma	Genoa
15:00 CEST (UTC+02:00)		Report		Stadium: Stadio Luigi Ferraris; Attendance: 25,152; Referee: Alberto Castellani

=== Coppa Italia ===
==== Round of 16 ====
4 December 2003 First leg	Roma	1–0	Palermo	Rome
18:00 CET (UTC+01:00)	Delvecchio 41'			Stadium: Stadio Olimpico; Referee: Massimiliano Saccani

17 December 2003 Second leg	Palermo	1–2 (1–3 agg.)	Roma	Palermo
17:30 CET (UTC+01:00)	Pepe 30'		Tommasi 69'; Delvecchio 80'	Stadium: Stadio Renzo Barbera; Referee: Emidio Morganti

==== Quarter-finals ====
14 January 2004 First leg	Milan	2–1	Roma	Milan
20:45 CET (UTC+01:00)	Tomasson 40'; Ambrosini 90'		Carew 33'	Stadium: San Siro; Referee: Domenico Messina

22 January 2004 Second leg	Roma	1–2 (2–4 agg.)	Milan	Rome
20:45 CET (UTC+01:00)	Mancini 81'		Nesta 49'; Tomasson 57'	Stadium: Stadio Olimpico; Referee: Emilio Pellegrino

=== UEFA Cup ===
==== First round ====
24 September 2003 First leg	Roma (Italy)	4–0	(North Macedonia) Vardar	Rome, Italy
21:00 CEST (UTC+02:00)	Lima (yellow card) 7'; Dellas 13'; De Rossi 21'; Dacourt (yellow card) 32'; Carew 54'; Delvecchio 90+2'	Report	Branković (yellow card) 36'; Ristovski (yellow card) 66'	Stadium: Stadio Olimpico; Attendance: 25,000; Referee: Florian Meyer (Germany)

15 October 2003 Second leg	Vardar (North Macedonia)	1–1 (1–5 agg.)	(Italy) Roma	Skopje, Republic of Macedonia
18:00 CEST (UTC+02:00)	Zaharievski 40'	Report	Samuel (yellow card) 29'; Mancini 63'; Cassano (yellow card) 66'	Stadium: Philip II Arena; Attendance: 7,000; Referee: Miroslav Liba (Czech Republic)

==== Second round ====
6 November 2003 First leg	Roma (Italy)	1–0	(Croatia) Hajduk Split	Rome, Italy
21:00 CET (UTC+01:00)	Montella (yellow card) 75'; Cassano 90+1'	Report	Vejić (yellow card) 47'	Stadium: Stadio Olimpico; Attendance: 31,000; Referee: Luis Medina Cantalejo (Spain)

27 November 2003 Second leg	Hajduk Split (Croatia)	1–1 (1–2 agg.)	(Italy) Roma	Split, Croatia
20:45 CET (UTC+01:00)	Bule (yellow card) 14', (goal) 33'; Neretljak (yellow card) 31'; Miladin (yellow card) 87'	Report	Samuel (yellow card) 37'; Zebina (yellow card) 76'; Tommasi (yellow card) 79'; Cassano 85'	Stadium: Stadion Poljud; Attendance: 35,000; Referee: Stuart Dougal (Scotland)

==== Third round ====
26 February 2004 First leg	Gaziantepspor (Turkey)	1–0	(Italy) Roma	Gaziantep, Turkey
18:00 CET (UTC+01:00)	Yusuf 19'; İlhan (yellow card) 69'	Report		Stadium: Kamil Ocak Stadium; Attendance: 18,000; Referee: Yuri Baskakov (Russia)

3 March 2004 Second leg	Roma (Italy)	2–0 (2–1 agg.)	(Turkey) Gaziantepspor	Rome, Italy
17:30 CET (UTC+01:00)	Cassano (yellow card) 5', (goal) 43'; Emerson 23', (yellow card) 51'; Carew (yellow card) 45'	Report	Johnson (yellow card) 82'	Stadium: Stadio Olimpico; Referee: Alain Hamer (Luxembourg)

==== Fourth round ====
11 March 2004 First leg	Villarreal (Spain)	2–0	(Italy) Roma	Villarreal, Spain
21:30 CET (UTC+01:00)	Anderson 29'; José Mari 35'	Report		Stadium: El Madrigal; Attendance: 20,000; Referee: Frank De Bleeckere (Belgium)

25 March 2004 Second leg	Roma (Italy)	2–1 (2–3 agg.)	(Spain) Villarreal	Rome, Italy
20:45 CET (UTC+01:00)	Emerson 10'; Cassano 50'	Report	Martí (yellow card) 33'; Belletti (yellow card) 42'; Anderson 66'	Stadium: Stadio Olimpico; Attendance: 29,100; Referee: Gilles Veissière (France)

== Statistics ==
=== Appearances and goals ===
No.	Pos	Nat	Player	Total		Serie A		Coppa		UEFA	
No.	Pos	Nat	Player	Apps	Goals	Apps	Goals	Apps	Goals	Apps	Goals
22	GK	(Italy) ITA	Pelizzoli	34	-16	31	-14	0	0	3	-2
5	DF	(France) FRA	Zebina	32	1	22+1	1	2	0	7	0
2	DF	(Italy) ITA	Panucci	29	2	24	2	2	0	3	0
19	DF	(Argentina) ARG	Samuel	40	1	30	1	2	0	8	0
4	DF	(Romania) ROU	Chivu	28	2	22	2	2	0	4	0
8	MF	(Brazil) BRA	Lima	44	0	32	0	4	0	8	0
15	MF	(France) FRA	Dacourt	33	1	27	1	2	0	4	0
11	MF	(Brazil) BRA	Emerson	42	5	33	3	1	0	8	2
30	MF	(Brazil) BRA	Mancini	45	10	33	8	4	1	8	1
10	FW	(Italy) ITA	Totti	32	20	31	20	0	0	1	0
18	FW	(Italy) ITA	Cassano	39	18	33	14	0	0	6	4
12	GK	(Italy) ITA	Zotti	12	-14	3	-5	4	-5	5	-4
23	FW	(Norway) NOR	Carew	29	8	10+10	6	3	1	6	1
32	DF	(France) FRA	Candela	20	0	8+4	0	4	0	4	0
17	MF	(Italy) ITA	Tommasi	29	1	7+13	0	4	1	5	0
31	DF	(Greece) GRE	Dellas	23	1	7+7	0	4	0	5	1
21	MF	(Italy) ITA	D'Agostino	26	1	6+10	1	4	0	6	0
9	FW	(Italy) ITA	Montella	14	5	5+6	5	0	0	3	0
27	MF	(Italy) ITA	De Rossi	27	1	4+13	0	4	0	6	1
24	FW	(Italy) ITA	Delvecchio	24	6	3+13	3	4	2	4	1
34	FW	(Italy) ITA	Corvia	5	0	1+2	0	1	0	1	0
28	MF	(Nigeria) NGA	Wahab	4	0	1	0	2	0	1	0
26	DF	(Italy) ITA	Galasso	1	0	1	0	0	0	0	0
33	MF	(Nigeria) NGA	Ajide	1	0	0+1	0				
1	GK	(Italy) ITA	Lupatelli	0	0	0	0	0	0	0	0
29	DF	(Italy) ITA	Scurto	0	0	0	0	0	0	0	0
37	MF	(Italy) ITA	De Martino	1	0	0	0	1	0	0	0
25	FW	(Italy) ITA	Cerci	0	0	0	0				
35	GK	(Italy) ITA	Curci	0	0	0	0	0	0	0	0
41	DF	(Italy) ITA	Servi	0	0	0	0				
40	MF	(Italy) ITA	Virga	0	0	0	0				
42	DF	(Italy) ITA	Piva	0	0	0	0				
Players transferred out during the season
20	DF	(Italy) ITA	Luigi Sartor	1	0	0	0	1	0		

- Source: http://calcio-seriea.net/presenze/2003/1249/

=== Goalscorers ===
Rank	No.	Pos	Nat	Name	Serie A	Coppa Italia	UEFA Cup	Total
1	10	FW	(Italy)	Francesco Totti	20	0	0	20
2	18	FW	(Italy)	Antonio Cassano	14	0	4	18
3	30	MF	(Brazil)	Mancini	8	1	1	10
4	23	FW	(Norway)	John Carew	6	1	1	8
5	24	FW	(Italy)	Marco Delvecchio	3	2	1	6
6	9	FW	(Italy)	Vincenzo Montella	5	0	0	5
6	11	MF	(Brazil)	Emerson	3	0	2	5
8	2	DF	(Italy)	Christian Panucci	2	0	0	0
8	13	DF	(Romania)	Cristian Chivu	2	0	0	2
10	5	DF	(France)	Jonathan Zebina	1	0	0	1
10	15	MF	(France)	Olivier Dacourt	1	0	0	1
10	16	MF	(Italy)	Daniele De Rossi	0	0	1	1
10	17	MF	(Italy)	Damiano Tommasi	0	1	0	1
10	19	DF	(Argentina)	Walter Samuel	1	0	0	1
10	21	MF	(Italy)	Gaetano D'Agostino	1	0	0	1
10	31	DF	(Greece)	Traianos Dellas	0	0	1	1
Own goal					1	0	0	1
Totals					68	5	11	84

Last updated: 16 May 2004

=== Clean sheets ===
Rank	No.	Pos	Nat	Name	Serie A	Coppa Italia	UEFA Cup	Total
1	22	GK	(Italy)	Ivan Pelizzoli	20	0	1	21
2	12	GK	(Italy)	Carlo Zotti	0	1	2	3
Totals					20	1	3	24

Last updated: 16 May 2004
