= 2012–13 Torino FC season =

Torino
2012–13 season
- President: Urbano Cairo
- Manager: Giampiero Ventura
- Stadium: Stadio Olimpico di Torino
- Serie A: 16th
- Coppa Italia: Fourth round
- Top goalscorer: League: Rolando Bianchi (11); All: Rolando Bianchi (13)
- Highest home attendance: 25,753 vs Internazionale
- Lowest home attendance: 10,783 vs Siena
- Average home league attendance: 15,631
Home colours	Away colours	Third colours

The 2012–13 season was Torino FC's 102nd season of competitive football, 85th season in the top division of Italian football and 68th season in Serie A.

== Season overview ==
Torino were promoted to Serie A after three years in the lower division, the president Urbano Cairo decided to continue the partnership with the coach Giampiero Ventura and sporting director Gianluca Petrachi for the 2012–13 season, the 96th in the top flight in Torino's history. The return to Serie A also granted the club an income of between €30–40 million, including TV rights, placement in the standings and domestic trophies.

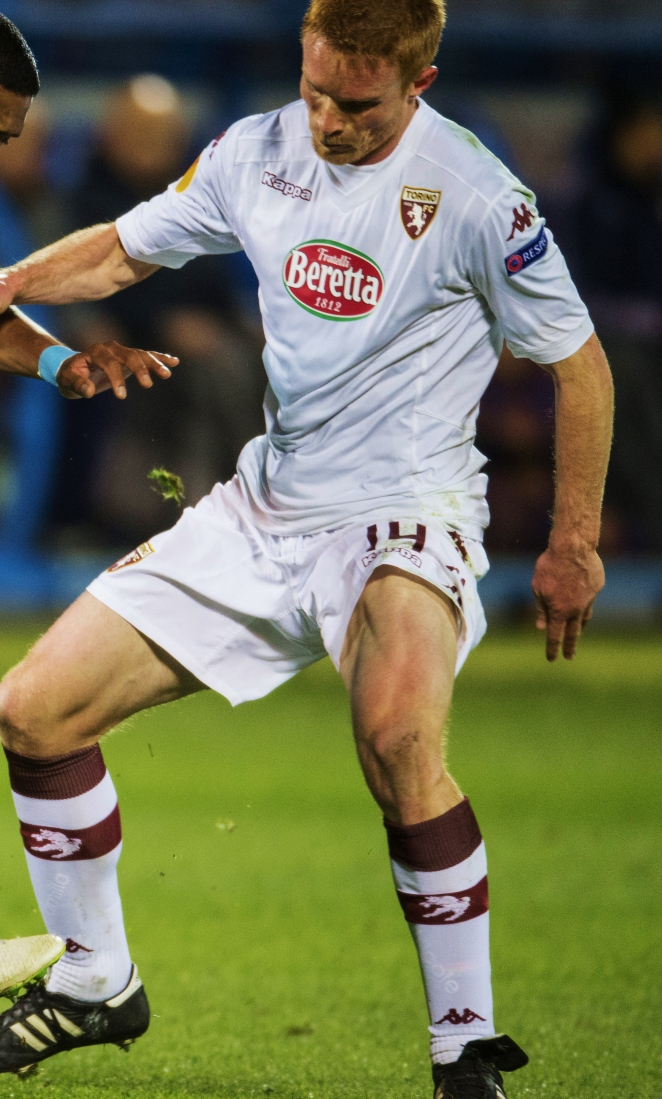
Alessandro Gazzi, acquired from Siena, was one of the cornerstones of the midfield constructed by the manager Ventura

== Transfers ==
=== Summer 2012 ===
==== In ====
First Team
Position	Player	From club	Transfer fee
GK	Jean-François Gillet	Bologna	outright
DF	Alessandro Agostini	Cagliari	outright
DF	Pablo Cáceres	Rangers de Talca	on loan / buying option
DF	Matteo Darmian	Palermo	co-ownership
DF	Marco Migliorini	Chieti	outright(€3,000)
DF	Guillermo Rodríguez	Cesena	outright
DF	Matteo Rubin	Bologna	end of loan
MF	Marko Bakić	Mogren	outright
MF	Migjen Basha	Atalanta	co-ownership(€6,000)
MF	Valter Birsa	Genoa	on loan / buying option
MF	Matteo Brighi	Roma	loan
MF	Alessio Cerci	Fiorentina	co-ownership
MF	Alessandro Gazzi	Siena	outright
MF	Nicolas Gorobsov	Politehnica Timișoara	end of loan
MF	Biagio Pagano	Nocerina	end of loan
MF	Mario Santana	Napoli	on loan / buying option
FW	Osarimen Ebagua	Catania	end of loan
FW	Riccardo Meggiorini	Genoa	outright (€1,200,000)
FW	Gianluca Sansone	Sassuolo	co-ownership

Reserves and youth
Position	Player	From club	Transfer fee
DF	Andrea Cristini	Cuneo	loan
DF	Damiano Ferronetti		outright
DF	Riccardo Fiamozzi	Varese	co-ownership
DF	Gabriele Franchino	Vigor Lamezia	end of loan
DF	Gabriele Quitadamo	Cuneo	loan
DF	Filippo Scaglia	Bassano	end of loan
DF	Nicolò Sperotto	Reggiana	co-ownership resolved
MF	Umberto Miello	Casale	end of loan
MF	Vincenzo Nitride	Nocerina	end of loan
MF	Pierpaolo Taraschi	SPAL	co-ownership resolved

==== Out ====
First Team
Position	Player	From club	Transfer fee
GK	Francesco Benussi	Palermo	end of loan
GK	Ferdinando Coppola	Milan	end of loan
GK	Davide Morello		end of contract
DF	Matteo Darmian	Palermo	end of loan
DF	Damiano Ferronetti		mutual termination
DF	Alessandro Parisi		end of contract
DF	Francesco Pratali		end of contract
DF	Matteo Rubin	Siena	co-ownership
DF	Luciano Zavagno		end of career
MF	Migjen Basha	Atalanta	end of loan
MF	Andrea Gasbarroni		end of contract
MF	Stefano Guberti	Roma	end of loan
MF	Manuel Iori	Chievo	end of loan
MF	Nnamdi Oduamadi	Milan	end of loan
MF	Biagio Pagano	Modena	outright
MF	Juan Surraco	Udinese	end of loan
FW	Mirko Antenucci	Catania	co-ownership resolved
FW	Osarimen Ebagua	Varese	outright

Reserves and youth
Position	Player	From club	Transfer fee
DF	Paolo Ropolo	Vallée d'Aoste	loan
DF	Gaetano Carrieri	Varese	co-ownership resolved
DF	Marco Chiosa	Nocera	loan
DF	Francesco Fiore	Vallée d'Aoste	co-ownership
DF	Gabriele Franchino	Monza	outright
DF	Luca Isoardi	Vallée d'Aoste	co-ownership
DF	Filippo Scaglia	Cuneo	loan
DF	Nicolò Sperotto	Carpi	co-ownership
MF	Vincenzo Nitride	Monza	co-ownership
MF	Umberto Miello	Monza	co-ownership
MF	Daniele Milani	FeralpiSalò	loan
MF	Pierpaolo Taraschi	Casale	outright
MF	Fabio Panepinto	Vallée d'Aoste	loan
FW	Alessio Vita	Monza	co-ownership

=== Winter 2012–13 ===
==== In ====
First Team
Position	Player	From club	Transfer fee
GK	Ferdinando Coppola	Milan	outright
FW	Barreto	Udinese	co-ownership
FW	Jonathas	Pescara	on loan / buying option
FW	Dolly Menga	Lierse	on loan / buying option

Reserves and youth
Position	Player	From club	Transfer fee
DF	Paolo Ropolo	Vallée d'Aoste	end of loan
FW	Nathan Kabasele	Anderlecht	on loan / buying option
FW	Simone Maugeri	Como	outright

==== Out ====
First Team
Position	Player	From club	Transfer fee
GK	Lys Gomis	Ascoli	loan
DF	Alessandro Agostini	Hellas Verona	on loan / buying option
DF	Marco Migliorini	Como	co-ownership
MF	Giuseppe De Feudis	Padova	outright
MF	Nicolas Gorobsov	Nocerina	loan
MF	Sergiu Suciu	Juve Stabia	loan
FW	Gianluca Sansone	Sampdoria	outright
FW	Alessandro Sgrigna	Hellas Verona	outright
FW	Simone Verdi	Juve Stabia	loan

Reserves and youth
Position	Player	From club	Transfer fee
DF	Paolo Ropolo	Gavorrano	compartecipazione

== Players ==
=== Squad information ===
Note: Flags indicate national team as defined under FIFA eligibility rules; some limited exceptions apply. Players may hold more than one non-FIFA nationality.

No.	Pos.	Nation	Player
1	GK	BEL	Jean-François Gillet
2	DF	URU	Guillermo Rodríguez
3	DF	ITA	Danilo D'Ambrosio
4	MF	ALB	Migjen Basha
5	DF	ITA	Valerio Di Cesare
6	DF	ITA	Angelo Ogbonna (vice-captain)
7	MF	ARG	Mario Santana (on loan from Napoli)
8	MF	ROU	Sergiu Suciu
9	FW	ITA	Rolando Bianchi (captain)
10	FW	ITA	Alessandro Sgrigna
10	FW	BRA	Barreto
11	MF	ITA	Alessio Cerci
13	DF	ITA	Damiano Ferronetti
14	MF	ITA	Alessandro Gazzi
15	DF	URU	Pablo Cáceres (on loan from Mallorca)
17	DF	ITA	Salvatore Masiello
18	MF	MNE	Marko Bakić
19	MF	SRB	Alen Stevanović
20	MF	ITA	Giuseppe Vives

No.	Pos.	Nation	Player
21	MF	ARG	Nicolás Gorobsov
23	GK	SEN	Lys Gomis
24	FW	ITA	Gianluca Sansone
25	DF	POL	Kamil Glik
26	GK	ITA	Alfred Gomis
27	MF	ITA	Giuseppe De Feudis
29	FW	BEL	Dolly Menga
31	DF	ITA	Alessandro Agostini
33	MF	ITA	Matteo Brighi (on loan from Roma)
35	GK	ITA	Ferdinando Coppola
36	DF	ITA	Matteo Darmian
51	DF	ITA	Davide Cinaglia
53	MF	ITA	Marco Migliorini
69	FW	ITA	Riccardo Meggiorini
77	MF	ITA	Simone Verdi
80	FW	BRA	Jonathas
86	FW	SVN	Valter Birsa (on loan from Genoa)
93	FW	SEN	Abou Diop
94	MF	BRA	Willyan Barbosa

== Competitions ==
=== Serie A ===
==== League table ====
Pos	Team	Pld	W	D	L	GF	GA	GD	Pts	Qualification or relegation
14	Sampdoria	38	11	10	17	43	51	−8	42 (Note: Sampdoria and Torino were docked 1 point due to involvement in the 2011–12 Italian football scandal.)	
15	Atalanta	38	11	9	18	39	56	−17	40 (Note: Atalanta was docked 2 points due to involvement in the 2011–12 Italian football scandal.)	
16	Torino	38	8	16	14	46	55	−9	39	
17	Genoa	38	8	14	16	38	52	−14	38	
18	Palermo (R)	38	6	14	18	34	54	−20	32	Relegation to Serie B

Source: Serie A, Soccerway
Rules for classification: 1st points; 2nd head-to-head points; 3rd head-to-head goal difference; 4th goal difference; 5th number of goals scored; 6th public draw.
(Head-to-head record is applied for clubs with the same number of points only once all matches between said clubs have been played)
(R) Relegated

==== Results summary ====
Overall								Home						Away					
Pld	W	D	L	GF	GA	GD	Pts	W	D	L	GF	GA	GD	W	D	L	GF	GA	GD
38	8	16	14	46	55	−9	40	6	6	7	23	26	−3	2	10	7	23	29	−6

Last updated: 4 May 2013.
Source: Competitive matches

==== Results by round ====
Round	1	2	3	4	5	6	7	8	9	10	11	12	13	14	15	16	17	18	19	20	21	22	23	24	25	26	27	28	29	30	31	32	33	34	35	36	37	38
Ground	A	H	H	A	H	A	H	A	H	A	A	H	A	H	A	H	A	H	A	H	A	A	H	A	H	A	H	A	H	H	A	H	A	H	A	H	A	H
Result	D	W	L	D	D	W	L	D	L	D	D	W	L	D	L	L	D	W	D	W	W	D	D	L	W	L	D	L	W	L	D	L	L	L	L	D	D	D
Position	12	5	8	11	13	6	9	9	13	12	13	10	14	13	14	15	15	13	13	11	11	11	11	12	10	11	11	15	11	14	15	15	16	16	16	16	16	16

Updated to match(es) played on 19 May 2013. Source: Competitive matches
A = Away; H = Home; W = Win; D = Draw; L = Loss

==== Matches ====
26 August 2012 1	Siena	0–0	Torino	Siena
20:45 CEST (UTC+02:00)				Stadium: Stadio Artemio Franchi – Montepaschi Arena; Attendance: 8,261; Referee: Piero Giacomelli

1 September 2012 2	Torino	3–0	Pescara	Turin
18:00 CEST (UTC+02:00)	Sgrigna 38'; Brighi 58'; Bianchi 62'			Stadium: Stadio Olimpico di Torino; Attendance: 13,469; Referee: Carmine Russo

16 September 2012 3	Torino	0–2	Internazionale	Turin
20:45 CEST (UTC+02:00)			Milito 13'; Cassano 83'	Stadium: Stadio Olimpico di Torino; Attendance: 25,753; Referee: Luca Banti

23 September 2012 4	Sampdoria	1–1	Torino	Genoa
12:30 CEST (UTC+02:00)	Pozzi 84' (pen.)		Bianchi 69' (pen.)	Stadium: Stadio Luigi Ferraris; Attendance: 23,859; Referee: Gianpaolo Calvarese

26 September 2012 5	Torino	0–0	Udinese	Turin
20:45 CEST (UTC+02:00)				Stadium: Stadio Olimpico di Torino; Attendance: 12,230; Referee: Daniele Orsato

30 September 2012 6	Atalanta	1–5	Torino	Bergamo
15:00 CEST (UTC+02:00)	Denis 28'		Bianchi 38' (pen.), 76'; Gazzi 62'; Stevanović 66'; D'Ambrosio 73'	Stadium: Stadio Atleti Azzurri d'Italia; Attendance: 13,738; Referee: Davide Massa

7 October 2012 7	Torino	0–1	Cagliari	Turin
15:00 CEST (UTC+02:00)			Nenê 74' (pen.)	Stadium: Stadio Olimpico di Torino; Attendance: 14,746; Referee: Domenico Celi

21 October 2012 8	Palermo	0–0	Torino	Palermo
15:00 CEST (UTC+02:00)				Stadium: Stadio Renzo Barbera; Attendance: 15,715; Referee: Andrea Romeo

28 October 2012 9	Torino	1–3	Parma	Turin
15:00 CET (UTC+01:00)	Basha 90+2'		Sansone 72'; Amauri 73'; Rosi 88'	Stadium: Stadio Olimpico di Torino; Attendance: 11,676; Referee: Piero Giacomelli

31 October 2012 10	Lazio	1–1	Torino	Rome
20:45 CET (UTC+01:00)	Mauri 57'		Glik 10'	Stadium: Stadio Olimpico; Attendance: 16,797; Referee: Antonio Giannoccaro

4 November 2012 11	Napoli	1–1	Torino	Naples
15:00 CET (UTC+01:00)	Cavani 6'		Sansone 90+1'	Stadium: Stadio San Paolo; Attendance: 34,813; Referee: Paolo Valeri

11 November 2012 12	Torino	1–0	Bologna	Turin
15:00 CET (UTC+01:00)	D'Ambrosio 66'			Stadium: Stadio Olimpico di Torino; Attendance: 13,723; Referee: Andrea Gervasoni

19 November 2012 13	Roma	2–0	Torino	Rome
20:45 CET (UTC+01:00)	Osvaldo 71' (pen.); Pjanić 86'			Stadium: Stadio Olimpico; Attendance: 34,011; Referee: Marco Guida

25 November 2012 14	Torino	2–2	Fiorentina	Turin
15:00 CET (UTC+01:00)	Cerci 40'; Birsa 76'		Gonzalo 74' (pen.); El Hamdaoui 84'	Stadium: Stadio Olimpico di Torino; Attendance: 15,879; Referee: Antonio Damato

1 December 2012 15	Juventus	3–0	Torino	Turin
20:45 CET (UTC+01:00)	Marchisio 57', 84'; Giovinco 67'			Stadium: Juventus Stadium; Attendance: 40,042; Referee: Gianluca Rocchi

9 December 2012 16	Torino	2–4	Milan	Turin
15:00 CET (UTC+01:00)	Santana 28'; Bianchi 80'		Robinho 40'; Nocerino 53'; Pazzini 61'; El Shaarawy 76'	Stadium: Stadio Olimpico di Torino; Attendance: 20,126; Referee: Andrea Romeo

16 December 2012 17	Genoa	1–1	Torino	Genoa
15:00 CET (UTC+01:00)	Granqvist 29'		Bianchi 19'	Stadium: Stadio Luigi Ferraris; Attendance: 17,937; Referee: Daniele Orsato

21 December 2012 18	Torino	2–0	Chievo	Turin
15:00 CET (UTC+01:00)	Sardo 12' (o.g.); Gazzi 26'			Stadium: Stadio Olimpico di Torino; Attendance: 11,019; Referee: Luca Banti

6 January 2013 19	Catania	0–0	Torino	Catania
18:00 CET (UTC+01:00)				Stadium: Stadio Angelo Massimino; Attendance: 12,548; Referee: Mauro Bergonzi

13 January 2013 20	Torino	3–2	Siena	Turin
12:30 CET (UTC+01:00)	Brighi 4'; Bianchi 38'; Cerci 45+2'		Reginaldo 32'; Paolucci 76'	Stadium: Stadio Olimpico di Torino; Attendance: 10,783; Referee: Marco Di Bello

20 January 2013 21	Pescara	0–2	Torino	Pescara
15:00 CET (UTC+01:00)			Santana 4'; Cerci 41'	Stadium: Stadio Adriatico; Attendance: 9,721; Referee: Paolo Mazzoleni

27 January 2013 22	Internazionale	2–2	Torino	Milan
20:45 CET (UTC+01:00)	Chivu 5'; Cambiasso 67'		Meggiorini 23', 53'	Stadium: San Siro; Attendance: 40,128; Referee: Davide Massa

2 February 2013 23	Torino	0–0	Sampdoria	Turin
18:00 CET (UTC+01:00)				Stadium: Stadio Olimpico di Torino; Attendance: 14,420; Referee: Nicola Rizzoli

10 February 2013 24	Udinese	1–0	Torino	Udine
15:00 CET (UTC+01:00)	Pereyra 7'			Stadium: Stadio Friuli; Attendance: 11,100; Referee: Luca Banti

17 February 2013 25	Torino	2–1	Atalanta	Turin
15:00 CET (UTC+01:00)	Cerci 42'; Birsa 87'		Denis 75' (pen.)	Stadium: Stadio Olimpico di Torino; Attendance: 11,585; Referee: Mauro Bergonzi

24 February 2013 26	Cagliari	4–3	Torino	Quartu Sant'Elena
15:00 CET (UTC+01:00)	Conti 75', 90+4'; Sau 37' (pen.); Pinilla 87' (pen.)		Cerci 47'; Stevanović 54'; Bianchi 90+2'	Stadium: Stadio Is Arenas; Attendance: 0 Referee: Sebastiano Peruzzo

3 March 2013 27	Torino	0–0	Palermo	Turin
12:30 CET (UTC+01:00)				Stadium: Stadio Olimpico di Torino; Attendance: 14,166; Referee: Gianluca Rocchi

10 March 2013 28	Parma	4–1	Torino	Parma
15:00 CET (UTC+01:00)	Amauri 77', 84', 90+1'; Sansone 80'		Santana 56'	Stadium: Stadio Ennio Tardini; Attendance: 12,688; Referee: Maurizio Mariani

17 March 2013 29	Torino	1–0	Lazio	Turin
20:45 CET (UTC+01:00)	Jonathas 82'			Stadium: Stadio Olimpico di Torino; Attendance: 11,683; Referee: Paolo Tagliavento

30 March 2013 30	Torino	3–5	Napoli	Turin
21:00 CET (UTC+01:00)	Barreto 30'; Jonathas 75'; Meggiorini 78'		Džemaili 10', 47', 80'; Cavani 84', 90'	Stadium: Stadio Olimpico di Torino; Attendance: 18,850; Referee: Antonio Giannoccaro

7 April 2013 31	Bologna	2–2	Torino	Bologna
20:45 CEST (UTC+02:00)	Kone 65'; Guarente 86'		Barreto 25'; Bianchi 90+4'	Stadium: Stadio Renato Dall'Ara; Attendance: 21,497; Referee: Andrea De Marco

14 April 2013 32	Torino	1–2	Roma	Turin
15:00 CEST (UTC+02:00)	Bianchi 31'		Osvaldo 22'; Lamela 60'	Stadium: Stadio Olimpico di Torino; Attendance: 17,129; Referee: Andrea Romeo

21 April 2013 33	Fiorentina	4–3	Torino	Florence
15:00 CEST (UTC+02:00)	Cuadrado 8', (yellow card) 50'; Aquilani 16'; Ljajić 33'; Rômulo 86'		Darmian (yellow card) 32' (yellow-red card); Barreto 45'; Santana 56'; Cerci 77'; Vives (yellow card) 82'; Bianchi (yellow card) 83'	Stadium: Stadio Artemio Franchi; Attendance: 33,944; Referee: Giampaolo Calvarese

28 April 2013 34	Torino	0–2	Juventus	Turin
15:00 CEST (UTC+02:00)	Meggiorini (yellow card) 45'; Masiello (yellow card) 57'; Glik (yellow card) 78' (yellow-red card)		Lichtsteiner (yellow card) 45'; Vidal 86'; Marchisio 90+1'	Stadium: Stadio Olimpico di Torino; Attendance: 23,845; Referee: Mauro Bergonzi

5 May 2013 35	Milan	1–0	Torino	Milan
15:00 CEST (UTC+02:00)	Mexès (yellow card) 49'; Muntari (yellow card) 73'; Boateng (yellow card) 74'; Balotelli 84', (yellow card) 85'			Stadium: San Siro; Attendance: 54,898; Referee: Antonio Damato

8 May 2013 36	Torino	0–0	Genoa	Turin
20:45 CEST (UTC+02:00)			Manfredini (yellow card) 24'; Granqvist (yellow card) 67'	Stadium: Stadio Olimpico di Torino; Attendance: 20,039; Referee: Gianluca Rocchi

12 May 2013 37	Chievo	1–1	Torino	Verona
12:30 CEST (UTC+02:00)	Théréau 10'; Cofie (yellow card) 40'; Cesar (yellow card) 56'; Seymour (yellow card) 71'		Cerci 19' (pen.); Vives (yellow card) 78'	Stadium: Stadio Marc'Antonio Bentegodi; Attendance: 5,000; Referee: Paolo Valeri

19 May 2013 38	Torino	2–2	Catania	Turin
20:45 CEST (UTC+02:00)	Cerci 53'; Bianchi 83'		Frison (yellow card) 8'; Almirón 25'; Bergessio 62'; Augustyn (yellow card) 75'	Stadium: Stadio Olimpico di Torino; Attendance: 15,861; Referee: Sebastiano Peruzzo

=== Coppa Italia ===
18 August 2012 Third round	Torino	4–2	Lecce	Turin
20:30 CEST (UTC+02:00)	Sgrigna 2'; Ferrario 14' (o.g.); Bianchi 66', 75'		Jeda 40'; Corvia 73'	Stadium: Stadio Olimpico di Torino; Attendance: 13,364; Referee: Mauro Bergonzi

28 November 2012 Fourth round	Siena	2–0	Torino	Siena
19:00 CET (UTC+01:00)	Zé Eduardo 46'; Reginaldo 77'			Stadium: Stadio Artemio Franchi – Montepaschi Arena; Attendance: 1.000; Referee: Luigi Nasca

== Statistics ==
=== Appearances and goals ===
No.	Pos	Nat	Player	Total		Serie A		Coppa Italia	
No.	Pos	Nat	Player	Apps	Goals	Apps	Goals	Apps	Goals
Goalkeepers
1	GK	(Belgium) BEL	Jean-François Gillet	38	0	37	0	1	0
23	GK	(Italy) ITA	Lys Gomis	1	0	0	0	1	0
35	GK	(Italy) ITA	Ferdinando Coppola	1	0	1	0	0	0
Defenders
2	DF	(Uruguay) URU	Guillermo Rodríguez	23	0	20+2	0	1	0
3	DF	(Italy) ITA	Danilo D'Ambrosio	28	2	22+6	2	0	0
5	DF	(Italy) ITA	Valerio Di Cesare	10	0	7+2	0	1	0
6	DF	(Italy) ITA	Angelo Ogbonna	23	0	22	0	1	0
15	DF	(Uruguay) URU	Pablo Cáceres	2	0	2	0	0	0
17	DF	(Italy) ITA	Salvatore Masiello	26	0	22+2	0	2	0
25	DF	(Poland) POL	Kamil Glik	33	1	31+1	1	1	0
36	DF	(Italy) ITA	Matteo Darmian	32	0	30	0	2	0
Midfielders
4	MF	(Albania) ALB	Migjen Basha	21	1	17+4	1	0	0
7	MF	(Argentina) ARG	Mario Santana	28	4	21+6	4	0+1	0
11	MF	(Italy) ITA	Alessio Cerci	35	8	32+3	8	0	0
14	MF	(Italy) ITA	Alessandro Gazzi	35	2	33+1	2	1	0
18	MF	(Montenegro) MNE	Marko Bakić	1	0	1	0	0	0
19	MF	(Serbia) SRB	Alen Stevanović	17	2	8+7	2	2	0
20	MF	(Italy) ITA	Giuseppe Vives	27	0	21+4	0	2	0
29	MF	(Belgium) BEL	Dolly Menga	1	0	0+1	0	0	0
33	MF	(Italy) ITA	Matteo Brighi	25	2	18+5	2	1+1	0
86	MF	(Slovenia) SVN	Valter Birsa	18	2	4+13	2	1	0
Forwards
9	FW	(Italy) ITA	Rolando Bianchi	33	13	25+7	11	1	2
10	FW	(Brazil) BRA	Barreto	16	3	13+3	3	0	0
69	FW	(Italy) ITA	Riccardo Meggiorini	33	3	18+13	3	0+2	0
80	FW	(Brazil) BRA	Jonathas	11	2	1+10	2	0	0
Players transferred out during the season
8	MF	(Romania) ROU	Sergiu Suciu	2	0	0+1	0	0+1	0
10	FW	(Italy) ITA	Alessandro Sgrigna	13	2	7+4	1	2	1
24	FW	(Italy) ITA	Gianluca Sansone	15	1	5+9	1	1	0
77	FW	(Italy) ITA	Simone Verdi	6	0	0+4	0	1+1	0

Last updated: 28 October 2012
Source: Competitions

=== Top scorers ===
This includes all competitive matches. The list is sorted by shirt number when total goals are equal.

R	No.	Pos	Nat	Name	Serie A	Coppa Italia	Total
1	9	FW	(Italy)	Rolando Bianchi	11	0	11
2	11	MF	(Italy)	Alessio Cerci	8	0	8
3	10	FW	(Brazil)	Barreto	3	0	3
=	69	FW	(Italy)	Riccardo Meggiorini	3	0	3
5	3	DF	(Italy)	Danilo D'Ambrosio	2	0	2
=	7	MF	(Argentina)	Mario Santana	2	0	2
=	14	MF	(Italy)	Alessandro Gazzi	2	0	2
=	19	MF	(Serbia)	Alen Stevanović	2	0	2
=	33	MF	(Italy)	Matteo Brighi	2	0	2
=	80	FW	(Brazil)	Jonathas	2	0	2
=	86	FW	(Slovenia)	Valter Birsa	2	0	2
12				Own goals	1	0	1
=	4	MF	(Albania)	Migjen Basha	1	0	1
=	10	FW	(Italy)	Alessandro Sgrigna^{1}	1	0	1
=	24	FW	(Italy)	Gianluca Sansone	1	0	1
=	25	DF	(Poland)	Kamil Glik	1	0	1

Last updated: 28 October 2012
Source: Competitions

Key:
^{1}:Alessandro Sgrigna left in the January transfer window
