= Alen Stevanović =

Swiss-born Serbian footballer

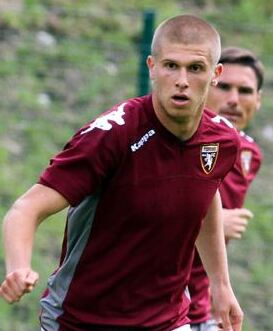
- Stevanović with Torino in 2014

Personal information
- Full name: Alen Stevanović
- Date of birth: 7 January 1991 (age 35)
- Place of birth: Zürich, Switzerland
- Height: 1.84 m (6 ft 0 in)
- Position: Winger

Youth career
- Radnički Beograd
- Radnički Obrenovac
- 2009–2010: Inter Milan

Senior career*
Years	Team	Apps	(Gls)
2008–2009	Radnički Obrenovac	12	(0)
2009–2010	Inter Milan	1	(0)
2010–2015	Torino	57	(5)
2011	→ Toronto FC (loan)	12	(0)
2013–2014	→ Palermo (loan)	21	(0)
2014–2015	→ Bari (loan)	16	(1)
2015	→ Spezia (loan)	9	(1)
2015–2017	Partizan	37	(5)
2018	Shonan Bellmare	8	(2)
2019	Wisła Płock	10	(1)
2021–2022	Tsarsko Selo	21	(1)
2022–2023	IMT	39	(7)
2023–2024	Jamshedpur	16	(0)
2024–2025	IMT	30	(2)

International career
2010	Serbia U21	1	(0)
2012–2013	Serbia	3	(0)
- * Club domestic league appearances and goals as of 15 May 2026

Alen Stevanović (Serbian Cyrillic: Ален Стевановић, pronounced [steʋǎːnoʋitɕ]; born 7 January 1991) is a professional footballer who plays as a winger. Born in Switzerland, he represented Serbia at international level.

A product of the Radnički Obrenovac youth academy, Stevanović made name for himself while playing for Torino. He made his debut with the Serbia national team in 2012.

== Early life ==
Stevanović's parents separated shortly after his birth in Zürich and he never met his biological father. Immediately after the separation, when Alen was only three months old, his mother brought him to Bečmen, SR Serbia to live with his grandmother and uncle while she returned to Switzerland. He could not reach his mother in Zürich as he was not granted a visa and could only see her once a year. His grandfather, who had worked both in Switzerland and had returned to Belgrade, died a year later at the age of 58 years. Until 2004–2005, as stated by himself, he was angry with life and this hindered the beginning of his playing career. He married Dunja on 17 February 2013 and on 20 November 2013 became the father of his first child Neva. On 27 July 2018, their son Matej was born.

== Club career ==
=== Inter Milan ===
Stevanović started his professional career in Serbia at FK Radnički Obrenovac. In early 2009, a trial was arranged for him at Italian champions Internazionale, and after arriving in Milan on 9 January, Stevanović was signed by the club in February.

In November 2009, Stevanović, along with youngster Giulio Donati, was named to the match-day squad against Livorno in Coppa Italia, but remained an unused sub.

He then traveled with the first team to Abu Dhabi, UAE and Saudi Arabia for winter training camp. He played the friendly match against Saudi Arabian side Al-Hilal as starter.

Due to the injuries incurred by Esteban Cambiasso, Sulley Muntari and Rene Krhin, Stevanović was named in the squad for the first league match after the winter break, against Chievo, but again didn't get any playing time.

A couple of days later, after Patrick Vieira left for Manchester City on 8 January 2010, Stevanović made his Serie A debut the very next day on 9 January at home versus Siena by coming on as a sub for Thiago Motta in the 67th minute. Head coach José Mourinho made the substitution in direct response to Siena taking the 3–2 lead on a goal scored two minutes earlier. By the end, Inter managed to overturn the score 4–3 with an injury time winner.

=== Torino ===
On 22 July 2010, Stevanović left for Serie B side Torino in co-ownership deal for €2 million., As part of the deal, Inter signed youngster Simone Benedetti in another co-ownership deal also for €2M. He debuted in Coppa Italia against Cosenza, earning a penalty kick. Torino coach Franco Lerda played him a further 8 times throughout the season and once more in Coppa Italia.

==== Toronto FC (loan) ====
On 24 March 2011, it was officially announced that Stevanović would join MLS club Toronto FC on loan. Stevanović made his debut for the club on 26 March 2011 in a 2–0 home victory against Portland Timbers. Following a 1–0 home defeat to Seattle Sounders FC on 18 June in which Stevanović earned his first start in nearly a month, the Serbian attacking midfielder was recalled by Torino.

=== Return to Torino ===
On 21 June 2011 the co-ownership agreement was renewed for the 2011–12 season. On 4 September 2011, he scored his first goal as professional footballer, giving Torino the lead against Varese. He ended the season with 36 appearances and 3 goals. On 22 June 2012, the co-ownership was once again renewed, with Torino renewing his contract until 30 June 2015. On 26 August 2012, Stevanović has played his first match in 2012–13 season against Siena, playing as a starter. On 30 September 2012, Stevanović has entered in game as a substitute for Mario Santana in 58th minute and score the goal after a cross from Alessio Cerci in 1–5 away league win over Atalanta.

On 19 June 2013, after 15 appearances and 2 goals in Serie A, the co-ownership agreement was resolved in favour of Torino.

==== Loans to Palermo, Bari and Spezia ====
On 11 July 2013, he moved to Palermo on loan with the right of redemption for the co-ownership, finalised the next day. He made his debut in the rosanero jersey, during the second round of Coppa Italia won 2–1 against Cremonese, held on 11 August 2013, playing as a starter. On 3 May 2014, after the victory against Novara, 1–0 away, he was promoted to Serie A – with five games to spare. He finished the season with 21 appearances and one in Coppa Italia.

On 24 July 2014 he was loaned to Bari, with the option to redeem his contract. In January 2015 he was recalled by Torino and loaned to Spezia in exchange for the forward Osarimen Ebagua and midfielder Pasquale Schiattarella.

=== Partizan ===
On 31 August 2015, Stevanović joined Partizan from Torino on a free transfer, signing a three-year contract and was given the number 91 shirt. Two days later he was officially presented at the Partizan Stadium. On 12 September 2015, Stevanović made his official debut for the club in an Eternal derby against Red Star Belgrade and scored the equalizer for Partizan. On 1 October 2015, Stevanović played his first match for Partizan in UEFA competitions in UEFA Europa League group stage in 1–3 away victory over Augsburg. He scored the leading goal for Partizan against Radnik Surdulica in 2–2 away draw on 14 October 2015. He has played 3 matches in 2015–16 UEFA Europa League group stage.

On 2 March 2016, Stevanović scored a goal in Serbian Cup quarter-final against Radnički Niš in 2–0 home win.

=== Shonan Bellmare ===
On 29 December he signed two-year contract for Shonan Bellmare. On 10 September 2018, he has officially terminated his contract with Bellmare by mutual consent.

=== Wisła Płock ===
Stevanović officially joined Polish club Wisła Płock on 12 February 2019 on a 1,5-year contract. On 27 July 2019 it appeared, that Stevanović had been excluded from the first team. A spokesman for the club explained that Stevanovic had broken certain of the club's rules, without further comment on which or what, but his contract wasn't terminated. It was later revealed, that the reason why he had been excluded was that he didn't show up at the rebound before a game against Lech Poznań. The exact same thing had already happened two times earlier in the same club. However, he was back training with the first team less than two weeks later.

On 19 August Wisła confirmed, that they had submitted a request to the Chamber for the Resolution of Sports Disputes for termination of the contract with Stevanović. On 30 August it was reported, that Stevanović had disappeared for the fourth time, he didn't show up for training and nobody had heard from him. The club president then said, that there were no chance for him to return this time and that they just was waiting for the request to terminate the contract was accepted.

=== Jamshedpur ===
On 17 July 2023, Stevanović joined Indian Super League club Jamshedpur on a two-year deal.

== International career ==
On 3 March 2010, he made his debut for the Serbia U-21 team against Macedonia.

On 12 October 2012, he was called up to the senior national team by coach Siniša Mihajlović, making his debut in the 67th minute as a substitute for Zoran Tošić in a defeat against Belgium in 2014 FIFA World Cup qualifier. On 22 March 2013, Stevanović was the first time in the starting lineup in the Serbia national team in his career against the Croatia on Maksimir.

== Career statistics ==
=== Club ===
As of match played 29 May 2025

Appearances and goals by club, season and competition
Club	Season	League			National cup (Note: Includes Coppa Italia, Serbian Cup, Emperor's Cup, Bulgarian Cup, Super Cup)		League cup (Note: Includes J.League Cup)		Other		Total	
Club	Season	Division	Apps	Goals	Apps	Goals	Apps	Goals	Apps	Goals	Apps	Goals
Radnički Obrenovac	2008–09	Serbian League Belgrade	12	0	—		—		—		12	0
Internazionale	2009–10	Serie A	1	0	0	0	—		—		1	0
Torino	2010–11	Serie B	8	0	2	0	—		—		10	0
Torino	2011–12	Serie B	34	3	2	0	—		—		36	3
Torino	2012–13	Serie A	15	2	2	0	—		—		17	2
Torino	Total		57	5	6	0	0	0	0	0	63	5
Toronto FC (loan)	2011	Major League Soccer	12	0	0	0	—		—		12	0
Palermo (loan)	2013–14	Serie B	21	0	1	0	—		—		22	0
Bari (loan)	2014–15	Serie B	16	1	0	0	—		—		16	1
Spezia	2014–15	Serie B	9	1	0	0	—		—		9	1
Partizan	2015–16	Serbian SuperLiga	20	3	5	1	—		3 (Note: Appearances in UEFA Europa League)	0	28	4
Partizan	2016–17	Serbian SuperLiga	17	2	1	0	—		1	0	19	2
Partizan	Total		37	5	6	1	0	0	4	0	47	6
Shonan Bellmare	2018	J1 League	8	2	2	0	2	0	—		12	2
Wisła Płock	2018–19	Ekstraklasa	9	1	0	0	—		—		9	1
Wisła Płock	2019–20	Ekstraklasa	1	0	0	0	—		—		1	0
Wisła Płock	Total		10	1	0	0	0	0	0	0	10	1
Tsarsko Selo	2020–21	First Professional Football League	4	0	1	0	—		—		5	0
Tsarsko Selo	2021–22	First Professional Football League	17	1	0	0	—		—		17	1
Tsarsko Selo	Total		21	1	1	0	0	0	0	0	22	1
IMT	2021–22	Serbian First League	15	4	0	0	—		2 (Note: Appearances in Serbian SuperLiga relegation play-offs)	0	17	4
IMT	2022–23	Serbian First League	24	3	1	0	—		—		25	3
IMT	Total		39	7	1	0	0	0	2	0	42	7
Jamshedpur	2023–24	Indian Super League	16	0	2	0	—		—		18	0
IMT	2024–25	Serbian SuperLiga	29	2	3	1	—		—		32	3
Career totals			287	25	22	2	2	0	6	0	317	27

=== International ===
As of 18 December 2013

Serbia national team
Year	Apps	Goals
2012	1	0
2013	2	0
Total	3	0

== Honours ==
Inter Milan

- Serie A: 2009–10

Toronto

- Canadian Championship: 2011

Palermo

- Serie B: 2013–14

Partizan

- Serbian SuperLiga: 2016–17
- Serbian Cup: 2015–16, 2016–17

Shohan Bellmare

- J. League Cup: 2018
