= Dolly Menga =

Belgian-Angolan footballer (born 1993)

Personal information
- Full name: Dolly Domingos Menga
- Date of birth: 2 May 1993 (age 33)
- Place of birth: Verviers, Belgium
- Height: 1.80 m (5 ft 11 in)
- Position: Forward

Team information
- Current team: FC Ans

Senior career*
Years	Team	Apps	(Gls)
2011–2012	Standard Liège	1	(0)
2012	→ Sint-Truiden (loan)	14	(2)
2012–2014	Lierse	37	(4)
2013	→ Torino (loan)	1	(0)
2014–2015	Benfica B	12	(0)
2015–2017	Braga	1	(0)
2015–2017	Braga B	18	(4)
2015–2016	→ Tondela (loan)	25	(0)
2016–2017	→ Hapoel Tel Aviv (loan)	14	(0)
2017	→ Ashdod (loan)	10	(0)
2017–2018	Blackpool	8	(0)
2018–2020	Livingston	28	(2)
2019–2020	→ Petro de Luanda (loan)	8	(0)
2021–2025	MCS Liège		
2025-	FC Ans		

International career^{‡}
2012	Belgium U19	3	(0)
2012	Belgium U21	4	(0)
2014–2016	Angola	10	(1)
- * Club domestic league appearances and goals as of 13:35, 23 August 2020 (UTC) ‡ National team caps and goals as of 11:11, 12 November 2017 (UTC)

Dolly Domingos Menga (born 2 May 1993) is a footballer who plays as a forward for Belgian amateur team FC Ans. Born in Belgium, he played at international level for the Angola national team.

== Club career ==
=== Benfica ===
On 30 August 2014, Menga signed for Portuguese champions Benfica until 2017. On 20 September, he made his debut for Benfica B, where he played 12 matches in Segunda Liga.

=== Braga and loans ===
On 2 February 2015, Menga signed for Braga in Portugal until 2018, for an undisclosed transfer fee. He made his debut for the first team in a 4–1 away defeat against Sporting CP. On 7 July 2015, Menga agreed to a one-year loan at recently promoted Tondela. In September 2016 he was loaned to Hapoel Tel Aviv, then he was loaned to F.C Ashdod FC. On 1 July 2017, Menga parted ways with Braga, as his contract ran out.

=== Blackpool ===
On 10 November 2017, Menga was picked up on a free transfer by EFL League One side Blackpool.

=== Livingston ===
Menga signed a two-year contract with Scottish Premiership club Livingston in August 2018. On 30 September 2018, he scored his first goal for Livingston in a 1–0 home win over Rangers. He was released by Livingston on 21 August 2020.

==== Loan to Petro de Luanda ====
On 18 July 2019, he was loaned to Angolan club, Petro de Luanda, for the 2019–20 season. The loan was cut short in January when Menga was recalled by Livingston in January 2020, before being released early from his contract in August of the same year.

=== Belgian amateur football ===
Menga signed for MCS Liège in 2021. He moved on to FC Ans for the 2025–26 season, and the club won promotion to the Belgian Division 3 (fifth tier) after finishing second in 1ère Provinciale (P1) Liégeoise.

== International career ==
In July 2014, Menga was asked to switch his international allegiance to Angola. On 15 November 2014, he debuted for the national team against Gabon in CAN 2015.

=== International goals ===
Scores and results list Angola's goal tally first.

Goal	Date	Venue	Opponent	Score	Result	Competition
1.	13 June 2015	Estádio Nacional da Tundavala, Lubango, Angola	Central African Republic	2–0	4–0	2017 Africa Cup of Nations qualification

== Career statistics ==
As of 17 February 2020

Appearances and goals by club, season and competition
Club	Season	League			National Cup		League Cup		Other		Total	
Club	Season	Division	Apps	Goals	Apps	Goals	Apps	Goals	Apps	Goals	Apps	Goals
Standard Liège	2011–12	Belgian Pro League	1	0	0	0	0	0	0	0	1	0
Sint-Truiden (loan)	2011–12	Belgian Pro League	14	2	0	0	0	0	0	0	14	2
Lierse	2012–13	Belgian Pro League	20	2	1	0	0	0	0	0	21	2
Lierse	2013–14	Belgian Pro League	17	2	1	0	0	0	0	0	18	2
Lierse	Total		37	4	2	0	0	0	0	0	39	4
Torino (loan)	2012–13	Serie A	1	0	0	0	0	0	0	0	1	0
Benfica B	2014–15	Segunda Liga	12	0	0	0	0	0	0	0	12	0
Braga	2014–15	Primeira Liga	1	0	0	0	1	0	0	0	2	0
Braga	2015–16	Primeira Liga	0	0	0	0	0	0	0	0	0	0
Braga	2016–17	Primeira Liga	0	0	0	0	0	0	0	0	0	0
Braga	Total		1	0	0	0	1	0	0	0	2	0
Braga B	2014–15	Segunda Liga	18	4	0	0	0	0	0	0	18	4
Tondela (loan)	2015–16	Primeira Liga	25	0	0	0	1	0	0	0	26	0
Hapoel Tel-Aviv (loan)	2016–17	Israeli Premier League	14	0	0	0	3	0	0	0	17	0
Ashdod (loan)	2016–17	Israeli Premier League	13	0	3	0	0	0	0	0	16	0
Blackpool	2017–18	EFL League One	8	0	0	0	0	0	0	0	8	0
Livingston	2018–19	Scottish Premiership	25	2	1	0	0	0	0	0	26	2
Livingston	2019–20	Scottish Premiership	3	0	1	0	0	0	0	0	4	0
Livingston	Total		28	2	2	0	0	0	0	0	30	2
Career total			172	12	7	0	5	0	0	0	184	12
