= Mancini (Brazilian footballer) =

Brazilian footballer (born 1980)

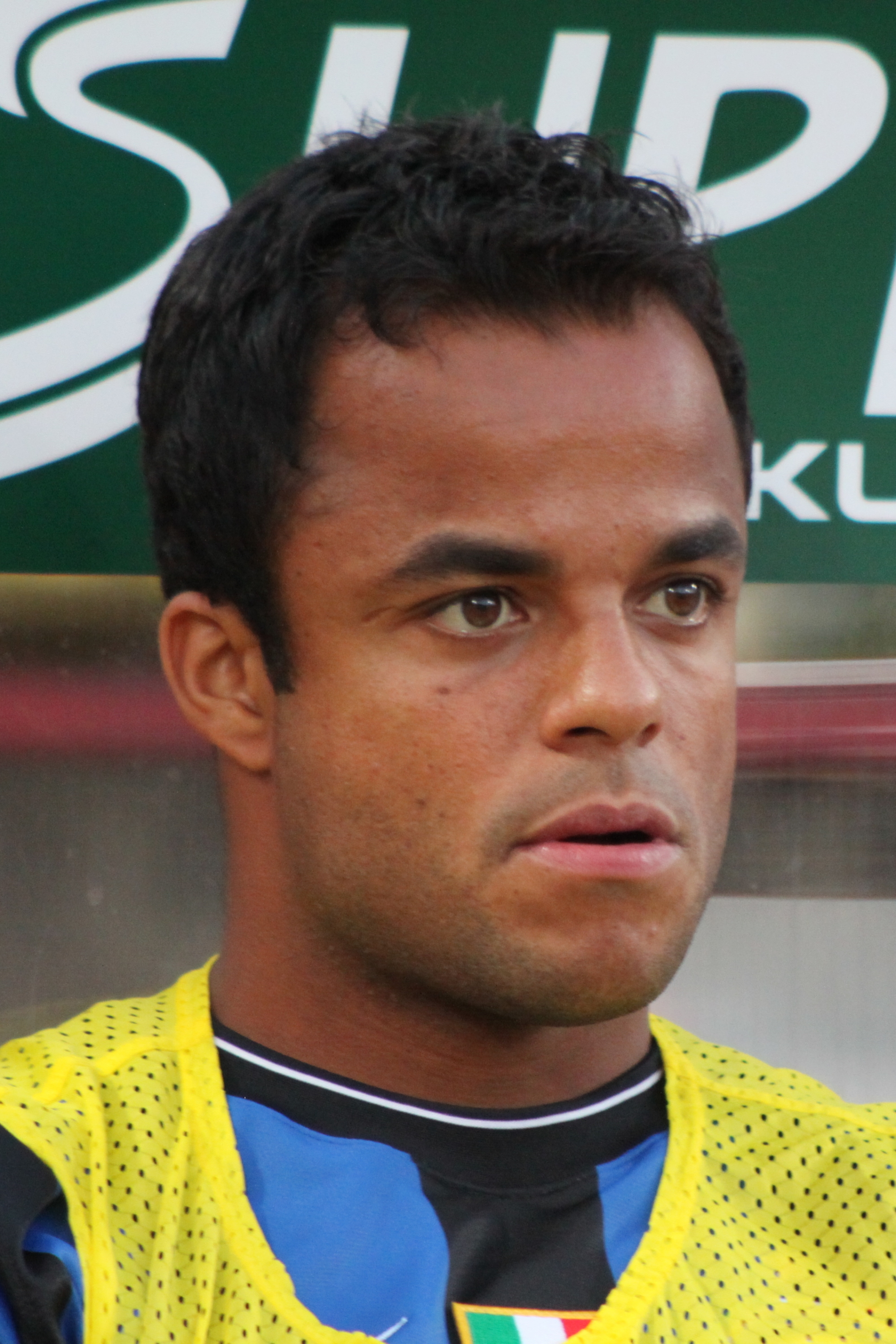
- Mancini with Inter Milan in 2009

Personal information
- Full name: Alessandro Faiolhe Amantino
- Date of birth: 1 August 1980 (age 46)
- Place of birth: Ipatinga, Minas Gerais, Brazil
- Height: 1.83 m (6 ft 0 in)
- Positions: Winger; right-back

Youth career
- 1997–1998: Atlético Mineiro

Senior career*
Years	Team	Apps	(Gls)
1999–2002	Atlético Mineiro	79	(17)
2001	→ Portuguesa (loan)	13	(4)
2001	→ São Caetano (loan)	14	(2)
2003	Venezia	13	(0)
2003–2008	Roma	154	(40)
2008–2011	Inter Milan	28	(1)
2010	→ AC Milan (loan)	7	(0)
2011–2013	Atlético Mineiro	45	(6)
2012	→ Bahia (loan)	15	(1)
2014	Villa Nova	9	(7)
2014–2015	América Mineiro	53	(14)
2016	Villa Nova	9	(6)
Total		439	(98)

International career
1999–2000	Brazil Olympic	9	(0)
2004–2008	Brazil	9	(0)

Managerial career
- 2019: Foggia
- 2020: Villa Nova
Medal record
Representing Brazil
Winner	2004 Peru
- * Club domestic league appearances and goals

Alessandro Faiolhe Amantino (Portuguese pronunciation: [ɐlɨˈsɐ̃dɾu faˈjɔʎi ɐmɐ̃ˈtʃinu]; born 1 August 1980), more commonly known as Mancini ([mɐ̃ˈsinʲi]), is a Brazilian football coach and former player.

Mancini started his career playing as a right-back for Atlético Mineiro in 1999. After moving to Italy in 2003, he was converted into an attacking player. During his time with AS Roma, Mancini was famed for his dribbling skills and use of feints, especially his step-overs, playing mainly as a winger on either flank, and occasionally as a second striker and an attacking midfielder. At international level, he made nine appearances for Brazil between 2004 and 2008, and was a member of the squad that won the 2004 Copa América.

== Club career ==
=== Early career ===
Regarded as a promising talent, Mancini began his career in his homeland of Brazil with his hometown club, Atlético Mineiro, where he remained from 1999 to 2002. During that time, he had two loan spells, at Portuguesa and at São Caetano in 2001.

=== Venezia ===
He was signed by Serie B side Venezia in January 2003. During that time, he struggled to adapt to Italian football and was criticised by the Venezia manager for his errors and for his habit of controlling the ball with the outside of his foot, which in Italy is considered unconventional.

Mancini only made 13 appearances for Venezia that season. In the summer of 2003, he was signed by AS Roma for nominal fees totalling €1,000.

=== Roma ===
Having lost Cafu, Roma needed a replacement at right-back, but with Mancini's early performances in Italy being far from convincing, many Roma fans were sceptical about his ability. However, their then-manager Fabio Capello gave the Brazilian a chance, and Mancini went on to complete a consistent first season in Serie A, the highlight being a backheel flick from a set piece in the Derby della Capitale against SS Lazio.

In the 2005–06 season, Mancini began to find his top form, once again becoming a key player for the Roma side. Following the Calciopoli scandal, Roma qualified for the UEFA Champions League, giving Mancini the chance to play at the highest level of club football.

In the last 16 of the 2006–07 UEFA Champions League, Mancini scored a goal against Lyon after beating their defender Anthony Réveillère with several stepovers before firing the ball high into the net."It was a beautiful goal and I'm very happy because I scored in a difficult and important match," Mancini told UEFA.com afterwards. "It was a mix of technique, strength and samba but mostly I'm happy to have helped Roma to win. We hope to be the big surprise of this UEFA Champions League even if we know it will be very difficult." That same year, Mancini also celebrated his first silverware since arriving in Italy as Roma won the Coppa Italia, beating Inter Milan 7-4 on aggregate with Mancini scoring in the first leg.

In the 2007–08 season, Mancini scored eight league goals as Roma reached the quarter-finals of the Champions League and finished as runners-up in Serie A for the second year running. He did not have the best of seasons, though, in what would prove to be his last in Rome.

=== Inter Milan ===
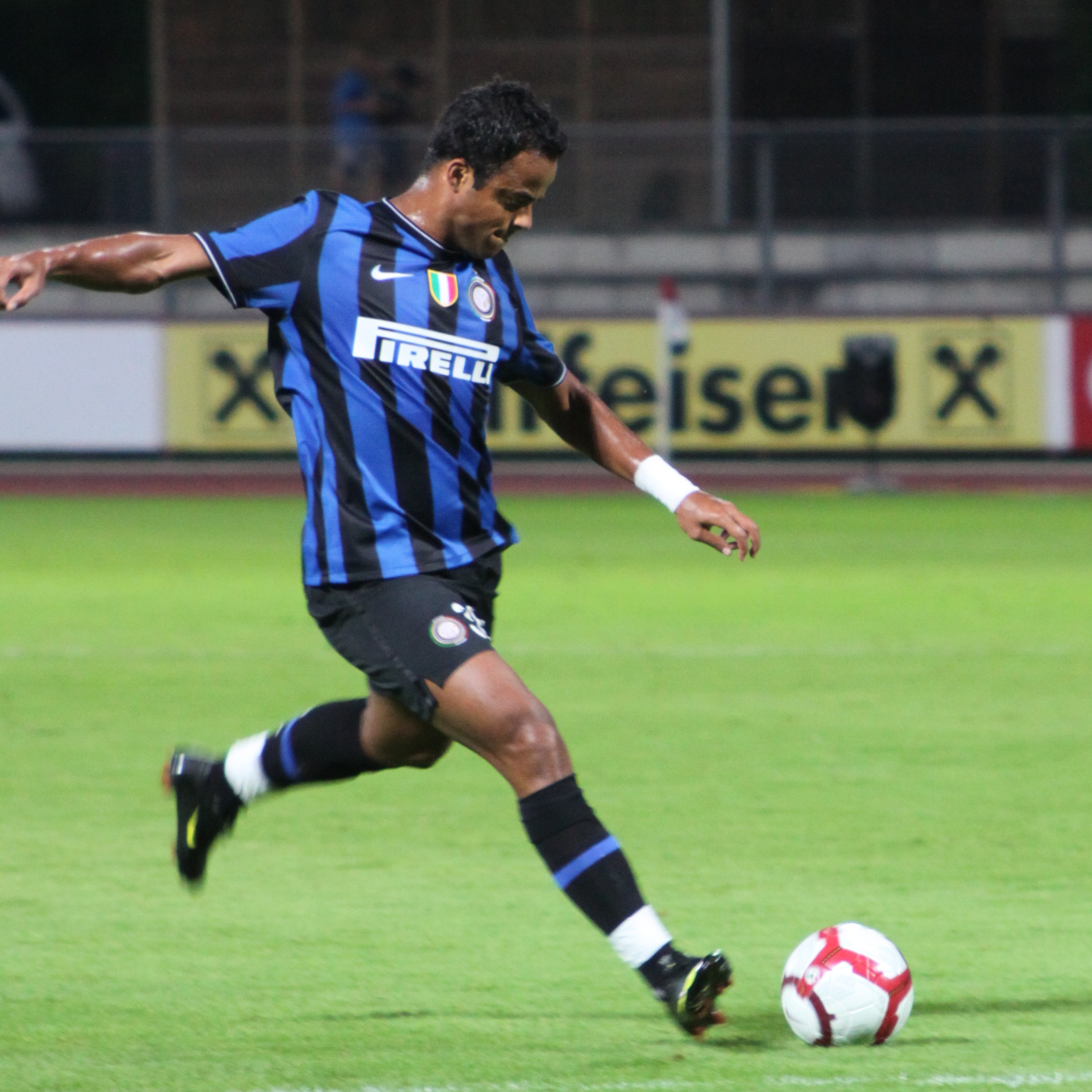
Mancini playing for Inter in 2009.

After the appointment of José Mourinho, Mancini was signed by Inter Milan for €13 million, along with Ricardo Quaresma and Sulley Muntari in his maiden season. (Although Mancini was a long-desired target of Massimo Moratti and ex-coach Roberto Mancini). However, he failed to become a first-team regular due to his lack of consistency.

=== Milan ===
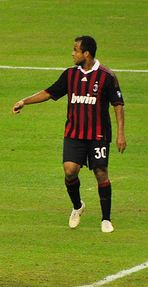
Mancini playing for AC Milan in 2010.

On 1 February 2010, he moved to city rivals AC Milan, on loan for the remainder of the 2009–10 season, with an option for them to acquire half of the player's rights at the end of the loan spell. He made his debut for Milan in a scoreless draw against Bologna.

=== Return to Inter and then Brazil ===
After playing only two official matches in the 2010-2011 season with Inter Milan, on 12 January 2011, he was permanently transferred to Atletico Mineiro, a club in the Brazilian championship, thus returning 8 years later to the team that had launched him. At the end of 2010, he was accused of sexual assault and personal injuries against a young Brazilian woman, whom he had met in Milan during a party hosted by Ronaldinho, on the night between 8 and 9 December 2010. Mancini always maintained that the girl was consenting. The outcome of the trial is unknown: as reported by Corriere della Sera, in 2019 Mancini's criminal record did not indicate a conviction, which would mean that "in subsequent appeals, Mancini was then acquitted, but also that Amantino, being a first-time offender - if the outcome of the appeal had allowed it - could have benefited from both probation and the 'non-disclosure' of the conviction on the criminal record." He scored the first goal of his second adventure in Belo Horizonte on 7 April 2011, in a 7-1 victory against America-TO in the Campeonato Mineiro. He concluded the 2011 season with 31 appearances and 3 goals in the Campeonato Mineiro, Série A, Copa do Brasil, and Copa Sudamericana.

In 2012, he won the Campeonato Mineiro, during which he played 14 matches and scored 3 goals.

On 21 June 2012, he moved to Bahia, where he signed a contract until the end of the year. He made his debut three days later, on 24 June, in a league match that ended in a 0-0 draw away against Figueirense. He scored his first goal for the Brazilian team on 22 July 2012, during a home match against Coritiba that ended 2-2. He made 16 appearances for Bahia, 15 in the national championship and one in the Copa Sudamericana.

At the end of 2012, he returned to Atlético Mineiro but was never used and terminated his contract with the Belo Horizonte team in April 2013. In November 2013, he was signed for the following season by Villa Nova, a team in the Brazilian Série D. His experience started very well, scoring 7 goals in 9 matches in the first months.

On 9 April 2014, he was signed by América-MG with a one-year contract. During his time at the club, he made 31 appearances and scored 9 goals.

On 7 January 2016, after being a free agent for almost a year, he returned to Villa Nova on a six-month contract. He made 11 appearances and scored 6 goals in the championship.

On 16 May 2016, at the end of the season, he officially retired from football.

He returned to Atlético Mineiro on 5 January 2011, signing a three-year contract.

In June 2012, Mancini joined Esporte Clube Bahia. He played for the team until the end of the year.

After spending 2013 as a free agent, in January 2014, Mancini signed with Villa Nova for their Minas Gerais state league campaign. He scored seven goals, making him the top scorer of the league.

At the end of the state league season, Mancini signed a contract with Série B team América until December 2014.

In January 2016, Villa Nova-MG agreed to hire Mancini for the next season.

== International career ==
With the Brazilian Under-20 national team, Mancini participated in the category's World Cup in 1999 in Nigeria. During the competition, in which Brazil was eliminated in the quarterfinals by Uruguay, Mancini played in 4 of the 5 matches, scoring a goal in the last match of the group stage against Zambia.

Between 1999 and 2000, he played 9 matches with the Olympic team, also participating in the CONMEBOL Pre-Olympic tournament.

On 28 April 2004, he made his debut with the senior national team in Budapest in a friendly match against Hungary (4-1 for the Seleção). With the Brazilian national team, he won the 2004 Copa América, in which he played 2 matches in the group stage.

In total, from 2004 to 2008, Mancini played 6 official matches with Brazil and an unofficial friendly match against Catalonia.

== Managerial career ==
On 7 August 2019, Mancini signed his first manager contract with Serie D club Foggia.

His short-lived experience as Foggia boss ended 2 September 2019, as he resigned after the first league game, a 0–1 away loss to Fasano.

On 1 September 2020, Mancini took over as the new head coach of Brazilian club Villa Nova. He was successively sacked on 8 October 2020, only to be reinstated the next day. He left the club by the end of the 2020 Campeonato Brasileiro Série D season.

== Personal life ==
=== Name and background ===
His nickname, Mancini, is a diminutive form of manso, the Portuguese word for 'calm'. His surname is, in the Iberian fashion, a composite of his parents' principal surnames. Portuguese naming customs most commonly have the mother's surname first, preceding the father's (in contrast to the traditional order usual in Spanish names). Mancini's follows the usual Portuguese order: The first surname element, Faiolhe, is a variant spelling of Faioli; the second surname component is Amantino. Mancini holds Italian nationality through descent, via his great-grandmother Genoveffa from Veneto.

== Career statistics ==
=== Club ===
Appearances and goals by club, season and competition
Club	Season	League			National cup		Continental		Other		Total	
Club	Season	Division	Apps	Goals	Apps	Goals	Apps	Goals	Apps	Goals	Apps	Goals
Atlético Mineiro	1999	Série A	15	1	2	0	—		11	0	28	1
Atlético Mineiro	2000	Série A	20	0	0	0	8	0	8	0	36	0
Atlético Mineiro	2002	Série A	25	15	7	0	—		15	3	47	18
Atlético Mineiro	Total		60	16	9	0	8	0	34	3	111	19
Portuguesa (loan)	2001	Série A	—		6	0	—		13	4	19	4
São Caetano (loan)	2001	Série A	14	2	—		—		—		14	2
Venezia	2002–03	Serie B	13	0	—		—		—		13	0
Roma	2003–04	Serie A	33	8	4	1	8	1	—		45	10
Roma	2004–05	Serie A	34	4	6	1	5	0	—		45	5
Roma	2005–06	Serie A	27	12	7	3	7	3	—		41	18
Roma	2006–07	Serie A	29	8	8	3	7	1	1	1	45	13
Roma	2007–08	Serie A	31	8	6	3	9	2	0	0	46	13
Roma	Total		154	40	31	11	36	7	1	1	222	59
Inter Milan	2008–09	Serie A	20	1	2	0	4	1	1	0	27	2
Inter Milan	2009–10	Serie A	6	0	0	0	1	0	0	0	7	0
Inter Milan	2010–11	Serie A	2	0	0	0	0	0	0	0	2	0
Inter Milan	Total		28	1	2	0	5	1	1	0	36	2
AC Milan (loan)	2009–10	Serie A	7	0	—		—		—		7	0
Atlético Mineiro	2011	Série A	16	1	1	0	2	0	12	2	31	3
Atlético Mineiro	2012	Série A	3	0	3	2	—		14	3	20	5
Atlético Mineiro	Total		19	1	4	2	2	0	26	5	51	8
Bahia (loan)	2012	Série A	15	1	—		1	0	—		16	1
Villa Nova	2014	Série D	—		1	1	—		9	7	10	8
América Mineiro	2014	Série B	27	7	—		—		—		27	7
América Mineiro	2015	Série B	21	6	3	1	—		5	1	29	8
América Mineiro	Total		48	13	3	1	0	0	5	1	56	15
Villa Nova	2016	Série D	—		—		—		9	6	9	6
Career total			358	74	56	15	52	8	98	27	564	124

=== International ===
National team	Year	Apps	Goals
Brazil	2004	3	0
Brazil	2007	3	0
Brazil	2008	3	0
Total		9	0

International appearances and goals
#	Date	Venue	Opponent	Result	Goal	Competition
1999
	14 November 1999	Sydney, Australia	Australia	2–0	0	Friendly
	17 November 1999	Melbourne, Australia	San Marino	2–2	0	Friendly
	10 December 1999	Cuiabá, Brazil	Bolivia	3–0	0	Friendly
	14 December 1999	Campo Grande, Brazil	Paraguay	3–3	0	Friendly
2000
	12 January 2000	Florianópolis, Brazil	Trinidad and Tobago	7–0	0	Friendly
	15 January 2000	Maringá, Brazil	Costa Rica	4–1	0	Friendly
	19 January 2000	Londrina, Brazil	Chile	1–1	0	2000 Olympic Games qualifying tournament
	23 January 2000	Londrina, Brazil	Ecuador	2–0	0	2000 Olympic Games qualifying tournament
	30 January 2000	Londrina, Brazil	Colombia	9–0	0	2000 Olympic Games qualifying tournament
2003–2004
1.	28 April 2004	Budapest, Hungary	Hungary	4–1	0	Friendly
2.	8 July 2004	Arequipa, Peru	Chile	1–0	0	2004 Copa América
3.	11 July 2004	Arequipa, Peru	Costa Rica	4–1	0	2004 Copa América
2006–2007
4.	24 March 2007	Gothenburg, Sweden	Chile	4–0	0	Friendly
5.	27 March 2007	Stockholm, Sweden	Ghana	1–0	0	Friendly
6.	1 June 2007	London, England	England	1–1	0	Friendly
2007–2008
7.	31 May 2008	Seattle, Canada	Canada	3–2	0	Friendly
8.	6 June 2008	Boston, USA	Venezuela	0–2	0	Friendly
9.	18 June 2008	Belo Horizonte, Brazil	Argentina	0–0	0	2010 FIFA World Cup qualification

== Honours ==
Atlético Mineiro

- Campeonato Mineiro: 1999, 2000, 2012

Roma

- Coppa Italia: 2006–07, 2007–08
- Supercoppa Italiana: 2007

Inter Milan

- Serie A: 2008–09
- Supercoppa Italiana: 2008

Brazil

- Copa América: 2004
