= Faioli =

Faioli is a Brazilian surname. Notable people with the surname include:

- Alexandre Faioli (born 1983), Brazilian footballer
- Mancini (Brazilian footballer) (born 1980), Brazilian footballer and manager
