= 2018–19 Livingston F.C. season =

Livingston
2018–19 season
- Chairman: Robert Wilson
- Manager: Kenny Miller (Until 20 August); Gary Holt (From 23 August)
- Stadium: Almondvale Stadium
- Scottish Premiership: 9th
- Scottish League Cup: Second round
- Scottish Cup: Fourth round
- Top goalscorer: League: Craig Halkett & Ryan Hardie (7); All: Craig Halkett, Ryan Hardie & Scott Pittman (7)
- Highest home attendance: 9,246, vs. Rangers, Premiership, 30 September
- Lowest home attendance: 552, vs. Berwick Rangers, League Cup, 28 July 2018
- Average home league attendance: 3,664
Home colours	Away colours

The 2018–19 season was Livingston's first season of play back in the top tier of Scottish football since 2006, having been promoted via the Premiership play-off from the Scottish Championship, at the end of the previous season. Livingston also competed in the League and Scottish Cup.

== Summary ==
=== Management ===
Having led the club to consecutive promotions manager David Hopkin departed the club during the close season on 31 May 2018, having declined the offer of a new contract. First team coach David Martindale took charge of team affairs in the interim. On 30 June 2018, former Rangers and Scotland striker Kenny Miller was appointed as player-manager on a two-year contract. Livingston marked his first managerial appointment.

On 20 August 2018, after just seven games Miller parted company with Livingston. The club wished Miller to take up a full time managers role, rather than the dual role he was currently undertaking and he wished to continue his career as a footballer. Assistant manager David Martindale took over team affairs in the interim, with Gary Holt being appointed as Head Coach three days later.

== Results and fixtures ==
Win Draw Loss Postponed

=== Friendlies ===
6 July 2018	Queen of the South	2–2	Livingston	Palmerston Park
19:45	Harkins 49'; Dykes 60'	Report	Cadden 35'; Gallagher 46'

24 July 2018	Gateshead	0–0	Livingston	Kingston Park
19:45		Report

=== Scottish Premiership ===
4 August 2018	Celtic	3–1	Livingston	Celtic Park
15:00	Rogic 8'; Édouard 26'; Ntcham 50' (pen.)	BBC Report	Robinson 90+3'	Attendance: 58,778; Referee: Walsh

11 August 2018	Livingston	0–0	Kilmarnock	Almondvale Stadium
15:00		BBC Report		Attendance: 2,586; Referee: Duncan

25 August 2018	St Mirren	0–2	Livingston	St Mirren Park
15:00		BBC Report	Hamilton 14'; Lithgow 36'	Attendance: 4,347; Referee: Beaton

1 September 2018	Livingston	2–1	Hibernian	Almondvale Stadium
15:00	Byrne 58'; Pittman 70'	BBC Report	Horgan 52'	Attendance: 5,305; Referee: McLean

15 September 2018	Livingston	1–0	Hamilton Academical	Almondvale Stadium
15:00	Lawless 3'	BBC Report		Attendance: 1,342; Referee: Muir

22 September 2018	Heart of Midlothian	0–0	Livingston	Tynecastle Park
15:00		BBC Report		Attendance: 17,798; Referee: Robertson

30 September 2018	Livingston	1–0	Rangers	Almondvale Stadium
13:30	Menga 34'	BBC Report		Attendance: 9,246; Referee: Thomson

6 October 2018	Motherwell	1–1	Livingston	Fir Park
15:00	Bowman 17'; McHugh (yellow card) 78' (yellow-red card)	BBC Report	Jacobs 64'	Attendance: 4,256; Referee: Collum

20 October 2018	Livingston	4–0	Dundee	Almondvale Stadium
15:00	Gallagher 18'; Halkett 43'; Lawless 76'; Lithgow 89'	BBC Report		Attendance: Walsh; Referee: 2,137

27 October 2018	Aberdeen	P–P	Livingston	Pittodrie Stadium
15:00
Note: Postponed due to Aberdeen's involvement in League Cup Semi Final.

31 October 2018	Livingston	0–1	St Johnstone	Almondvale Stadium
19:45		BBC Report	Kennedy 5'	Attendance: 1,476; Referee: Beaton

3 November 2018	Hamilton Academical	1–0	Livingston	New Douglas Park
15:00	Miller (yellow card) 61' (yellow-red card) 85'; Bloomfield 86'	BBC Report		Attendance: 1,459; Referee: Muir

11 November 2018	Livingston	0–0	Celtic	Almondvale Stadium
12:00		BBC Report		Attendance: 9,016; Referee: Clancy

24 November 2018	Rangers	3–0	Livingston	Ibrox Stadium
15:00	Candeias 20'; Morelos 83'; Arfield 88'	Report		Attendance: 49,448; Referee: Nick Walsh

1 December 2018	Livingston	2–0	Motherwell	Almondvale Stadium
15:00	Lawless 22'; Hamilton (yellow card) 34'; Halkett 83'	Report	Bigirimana (yellow card) 36'; Tait (yellow card) 64'	Attendance: 1,982; Referee: Anderson

5 December 2018	Kilmarnock	2–0	Livingston	Rugby Park
19:45	Stewart 3', 20'	Report	Byrne (yellow card) 39'; Pittman (yellow card) 71'	Attendance: 4,143; Referee: Madden

8 December 2018	Livingston	3–1	St Mirren	Almondvale Stadium
15:00	Pittman 50'; Hardie 64'; Sibbald 88'	BBC Report	Jones 36'	Attendance: 1,727; Referee: Dallas

11 December 2018	Aberdeen	3–2	Livingston	Pittodrie Stadium
19:45	McGinn 9'; Cosgrove 57'; Ferguson 90+2'	BBC Report	Pittman 12'; McMillan 33'	Attendance: 12,252; Referee: Thomson

14 December 2018	Livingston	5–0	Heart of Midlothian	Almondvale Stadium
19:45	Menga (yellow card) 64', (goal) 76'; Halkett 72' (Penalty); Hardie 77', 79'; Byrne 86'	BBC Report	Djoum (yellow card) 52' (yellow-red card) 74'; Zlamal (yellow card) 72'	Attendance: 4,201; Referee: Walsh

22 December 2018	Hibernian	1–1	Livingston	Easter Road
15:00	Porteous (yellow card) 43', (goal) 80'	Report	Menga (yellow card) 55'; Hardie 56', (yellow card) 72'; Lawless (yellow card) 86'	Attendance: 17,056; Referee: Greg Aitken

26 December 2018	Dundee	0–0	Livingston	Dens Park
15:00	Boyle (yellow card) 9'; McGowan (yellow card) 29'	Report	Hamilton (red card) 84'	Attendance: 4,905; Referee: Bobby Madden

29 December 2018	Livingston	1–2	Aberdeen	Almondvale Stadium
15:00	Hardie 89'	Report	Wilson 71'; Lithgow 85' (o.g.)	Attendance: 5,548; Referee: Steven McLean

23 January 2019	St Johnstone	1–0	Livingston	McDiarmid Park
19:45	Davidson 78'	BBC Report		Attendance: 1,946; Referee: Dallas

26 January 2019	Livingston	0–3	Rangers	Almondvale Stadium
15:00		BBC Report	Jack 30'; Kent 48'; Morelos 74'	Attendance: 9,028; Referee: Clancy

2 February 2019	Motherwell	3–0	Livingston	Fir Park
15:00	Hastie 6', 21'; Main 12'	BBC Report		Attendance: 3,839; Referee: Beaton

6 February 2019	Heart of Midlothian	0–0	Livingston	Tynecastle Park
19:45	Lee (yellow card) 50'	BBC Report	Gallagher (yellow card) 37'; Lawless (yellow card) 88'	Attendance: 15,147; Referee: Muir

16 February 2019	Livingston	1–2	Dundee	Almondvale Stadium
15:00	Byrne (red card) 14'; Halkett 18'	Report	Nelson 54'; Wright 82'	Attendance: 2,321; Referee: Greg Aitken

23 February 2019	Livingston	1–0	Kilmarnock	Almondvale Stadium
15:00	Erskine 44'; Brown (yellow card) 71'; Kelly (yellow card) 90'	Report		Attendance: 2,569; Referee: Andrew Dallas

2 March 2019	St Mirren	1–0	Livingston	St Mirren Park
19:45	S McGinn (yellow card) 65'; Flynn 89'	Report	Jacobs (yellow card) 19'; Lawson (yellow card) 48'; Robinson (yellow card) 69'	Attendance: 4,014; Referee: Nick Walsh

9 March 2019	Livingston	3–1	St Johnstone	Almondvale Stadium
15:00	Halkett 38'; Sibbald 46', (yellow card) 62'; Pittman 90+2'	Report	Shaughnessy 14'; Goss (yellow card) 63'	Attendance: 1,615; Referee: John Beaton

16 March 2019	Aberdeen	1–1	Livingston	Pittodrie Stadium
15:00	McGinn 30'	Report	Sibbald 43'	Attendance: 14,366; Referee: Don Robertson

29 March 2019	Livingston	1–2	Hibernian	Almondvale Stadium
15:00	Hardie 90+1' (pen.)	Report	Hanlon 71'; Mallan 75'	Attendance: 4,774; Referee: Nick Walsh

3 April 2019	Livingston	2–0	Hamilton Academical	Almondvale Stadium
19:45	Robinson (yellow card) 13'; Lithgow (yellow card) 33'; Hardie 46'; Halkett 79'	Report	Andreu (yellow card) 62'; Miller (yellow card) 66'	Attendance: 1,022; Referee: Alan Muir

6 April 2019	Celtic	0–0	Livingston	Celtic Park
15:00		Report	Lamie (yellow card) 42'; Gallagher (yellow card) 51'; Halkett (yellow card) 67'; Lithgow (yellow card) 76'	Attendance: 58,850; Referee: Euan Anderson

20 April 2019	Livingston	1–3	St Mirren	Almondvale Stadium
15:00	Robinson 20'	Report	P. McGinn 26'; Mullen 78'; Jackson 80'	Attendance: 2,347; Referee: Willie Collum

27 April 2019	Hamilton Academical	3–3	Livingston	Hamilton
15:00 BST (UTC+1)	Oakley 40'; Imrie 47' (pen.), (yellow card) 62'; Smith (yellow card) 86'; McGowan 90'	Report	Kelly (yellow card) 47'; Pittman 57', 71'; Lawson 67'	Stadium: New Douglas Park; Attendance: 1,135; Referee: Greg Aitken

4 May 2019	St Johnstone	1–1	Livingston	McDiarmid Park
15:00	O'Halloran 4'	Report	Halkett (yellow card) 51' (goal) 84'; Gallagher (yellow card) 86'	Attendance: 2,222; Referee: David Munro

11 May 2019	Livingston	0–1	Dundee	Almondvale Stadium
15:00		Report	K. Miller 11'	Attendance: 1,374; Referee: Alan Newlands

18 May 2019	Motherwell	3–2	Livingston	Motherwell
12:30 BST (UTC+1)	Donnelly 10'; Turnbull 21', 25' (pen.) (penalty missed) 44'	Report	Hardie (penalty missed) 42'; Tiffoney 80', 81'	Stadium: Fir Park; Attendance: 5,794; Referee: David Munro

=== Scottish League Cup ===
14 July 2018 League Cup Group F	Airdrieonians	1–2	Livingston	Excelsior Stadium
15:00	Duffy 53'	SPFL Report	Pittman 24'; Miller 25'	Attendance: 733; Referee: Walsh

17 July 2018 League Cup Group F	Hamilton Academical	0–0 (5–6 p)	Livingston	New Douglas Park
19:45		SPFL Report		Attendance: 1,012; Referee: Beaton
	Penalties
	Imrie (penalty scored); Bingham (penalty scored); Kelly (penalty scored); Penny (penalty scored); MacKinnon (penalty missed); Cunningham (penalty scored); McGowan (penalty missed); Lyon (penalty missed)		(penalty scored) Halkett; (penalty missed) Lamie; (penalty scored) Sibbald; (penalty scored) Robinson; (penalty scored) Hamilton; (penalty scored) Crane; (penalty missed) Gallagher; (penalty scored) McMillan

21 July 2018 League Cup Group F	Livingston	1–0	Annan Athletic	Prestonfield (Note: Due to ongoing work on the playing surface at Almondvale the match was played at Prestonfield.)
	Miller 14'; Lamie (red card) 88'	SPFL Report		Attendance: 678; Referee: Clancy

28 July 2018 League Cup Group F	Livingston	2–0	Berwick Rangers	Prestonfield (Note: Due to late delivery of the new playing surface at Almondvale the match was played at Prestonfield.)
15:00	Hamilton 3'; McMillan 82'	BBC Report		Attendance: 552; Referee: Kirkland

18 August 2018 League Cup Second round	Livingston	0–1	Motherwell	Almondvale Stadium
15:00 BST (UTC+1)		BBC Report	Johnson 23'	Attendance: 1,957; Referee: Collum

=== Scottish Cup ===
20 January 2019 Scottish Cup Fourth round	Heart of Midlothian	1–0	Livingston	Tynecastle Park
14:30	Clare 48'	BBC Report		Attendance: 11,077; Referee: Collum

== First team player statistics ==
=== Appearances ===
During the 2018–19 season, Livingston used thirty three players in competitive games. The table below shows the number of appearances and goals scored by each player.
Scott Pittman and Declan Gallagher started every match of the season.

As of 18 May 2019

No.	Pos	Nat	Player	Total		Premiership		League Cup		Scottish Cup	
No.	Pos	Nat	Player	Apps	Goals	Apps	Goals	Apps	Goals	Apps	Goals
1	GK	(Scotland) SCO	Liam Kelly	42	0	36	0	5	0	1	0
3	DF	(Scotland) SCO	Ricki Lamie	30	0	23+2	0	3+1	0	0+1	0
4	DF	(Scotland) SCO	Alan Lithgow	38	2	35	2	1+1	0	1	0
5	DF	(Northern Ireland) NIR	Ciaron Brown	5	0	4+1	0	0	0	0	0
6	MF	(Scotland) SCO	Shaun Byrne	38	2	29+3	2	5	0	1	0
7	MF	(South Africa) RSA	Keaghan Jacobs	33	1	26+5	1	0+1	0	1	0
8	MF	(Scotland) SCO	Scott Pittman	44	7	38	6	5	1	1	0
9	FW	(Scotland) SCO	Ryan Hardie	22	7	13+8	7	0	0	1	0
10	MF	(Scotland) SCO	Craig Sibbald	29	3	16+10	3	1+2	0	0	0
12	GK	(Scotland) SCO	Gary Maley	0	0	0	0	0	0	0	0
14	DF	(England) ENG	Hakeem Odoffin	13	0	7+6	0	0	0	0	0
15	MF	(Scotland) SCO	Steven Lawless	37	3	29+6	3	1	0	1	0
17	MF	(Scotland) SCO	Scott Robinson	31	2	19+7	2	4+1	0	0	0
18	FW	(Scotland) SCO	Lee Miller	12	1	6+3	0	3	1	0	0
19	FW	(Scotland) SCO	Chris Erskine	11	1	8+2	1	0	0	0+1	0
21	GK	(Scotland) SCO	Ross Stewart	2	0	2	0	0	0	0	0
22	MF	(Scotland) SCO	Scott Tiffoney	8	2	1+7	2	0	0	0	0
23	MF	(Italy) ITA	Raffaele De Vita	3	0	0+3	0	0	0	0	0
26	DF	(Scotland) SCO	Craig Halkett	40	7	34	7	5	0	1	0
31	DF	(Scotland) SCO	Declan Gallagher	44	1	38	1	5	0	1	0
33	DF	(Togo) TOG	Steve Lawson	25	1	16+9	1	0	0	0	0
39	MF	(Scotland) SCO	Gregg Wylde	3	0	0+2	0	0	0	1	0
45	FW	(Angola) ANG	Dolly Menga	26	2	20+5	2	0	0	1	0
Players who left the club during the season
2	DF	(Scotland) SCO	Jack McMillan	11	2	3+4	1	0+4	1	0	0
5	DF	(Scotland) SCO	Steven Saunders	5	0	2+1	0	2	0	0	0
9	FW	(Scotland) SCO	Kenny Miller	7	1	2	0	5	1	0	0
11	MF	(Scotland) SCO	Nicky Cadden	16	0	4+8	0	3+1	0	0	0
12	DF	(Scotland) SCO	Callum Crane	4	0	0	0	3+1	0	0	0
14	MF	(Albania) ALB	Egli Kaja	8	0	2+4	0	2	0	0	0
16	FW	(Scotland) SCO	Matthew Knox	1	0	0	0	0+1	0	0	0
19	MF	(Northern Ireland) NIR	Bobby Burns	8	0	3+5	0	0	0	0	0
22	MF	(Scotland) SCO	Craig Henderson	0	0	0	0	0	0	0	0
24	MF	(Scotland) SCO	Cameron Blues	0	0	0	0	0	0	0	0
25	DF	(England) ENG	James Brown	1	0	1	0	0	0	0	0
25	DF	(Netherlands) NED	Henk van Schaik	1	0	0+1	0	0	0	0	0
28	DF	(Scotland) SCO	Cammy Clark	0	0	0	0	0	0	0	0
30	FW	(Scotland) SCO	Jack Hamilton	18	2	2+11	1	2+2	1	0+1	0

=== Disciplinary record ===
During the 2018–19 season, Livingston players were issued with Sixty-one yellow cards and four red. The table below shows the number of cards and type shown to each player.

Last updated 18 May 2019

Number	Nation	Position	Name	Premiership		League Cup		Scottish Cup		Total	
Number	Nation	Position	Name	Booked	Sent off (straight red)	Booked	Sent off (straight red)	Booked	Sent off (straight red)	Booked	Sent off (straight red)
1	(Scotland)	GK	Liam Kelly	4	0	0	0	0	0	4	0
2	(Scotland)	DF	Jack McMillan	2	0	0	0	0	0	2	0
3	(Scotland)	DF	Ricki Lamie	4	0	0	1	0	0	4	1
4	(Scotland)	DF	Alan Lithgow	3	0	0	0	0	0	3	0
5	(Northern Ireland)	DF	Ciaron Brown	1	0	0	0	0	0	1	0
6	(Scotland)	MF	Shaun Byrne	2	1	0	0	1	0	3	1
7	(South Africa)	MF	Keaghan Jacobs	5	0	0	0	0	0	5	0
8	(Scotland)	MF	Scott Pittman	3	0	1	0	0	0	4	0
9	(Scotland)	FW	Kenny Miller	1	0	1	0	0	0	2	0
9	(Scotland)	FW	Ryan Hardie	1	0	0	0	0	0	1	0
10	(Scotland)	MF	Craig Sibbald	1	0	0	0	0	0	1	0
14	(Albania)	MF	Egli Kaja	1	0	0	0	0	0	1	0
15	(Scotland)	MF	Steven Lawless	3	0	0	0	0	0	3	0
17	(Scotland)	MF	Scott Robinson	4	0	0	0	0	0	4	0
19	(Northern Ireland)	MF	Bobby Burns	1	0	0	0	0	0	1	0
26	(Scotland)	DF	Craig Halkett	6	1	0	0	0	0	6	1
30	(Scotland)	FW	Jack Hamilton	1	1	0	0	0	0	1	1
31	(Scotland)	DF	Declan Gallagher	7	0	0	0	0	0	7	0
33	(Togo)	DF	Steve Lawson	2	0	0	0	0	0	2	0
45	(Angola)	FW	Dolly Menga	6	0	0	0	0	0	6	0
Total				58	3	2	1	1	0	61	4

== Team statistics ==
=== League table ===
Pos	Team	Pld	W	D	L	GF	GA	GD	Pts	Qualification or relegation (Note: Teams play each other three times (33 matches), before the league is split into two groups (the top six and the bottom six).)
7	St Johnstone	38	15	7	16	38	48	−10	52	
8	Motherwell	38	15	6	17	46	56	−10	51	
9	Livingston	38	11	11	16	42	44	−2	44	
10	Hamilton Academical	38	9	6	23	28	75	−47	33	
11	St Mirren (O)	38	8	8	22	34	66	−32	32	Qualification for the Premiership play-off final

Source: Soccerway BBC
Rules for classification: 1) Points; 2) Goal difference; 3) Goals scored; 4) Play-off (only if deciding champion, UEFA competitions qualification and second stage group allocation).
(O) Play-off winners

=== Management statistics ===
Last updated on 18 May 2019

Name	From	To	P	W	D	L	Win% (Note: Win% is the percentage of matches won rounded to two decimal places.)
Kenny Miller	14 July 2018	20 August 2018	7	3	2	2	42.86
Gary Holt	23 August 2018	18 May 2019	37	11	10	16	29.73

== Transfers ==
=== In ===
Player	From	Fee
(Scotland) Craig Sibbald	(Scotland) Falkirk	Undisclosed
(Scotland) Steven Saunders	(Wales) The New Saints	Free
(Scotland) Liam Kelly	(Scotland) Rangers	Undisclosed
(Scotland) Ricki Lamie	(Scotland) Greenock Morton	Free
(Scotland) Callum Crane	(Scotland) Hibernian	Undisclosed
(Scotland) Cameron Blues	(Scotland) Falkirk	Free
(Scotland) Ryan Hardie	(Scotland) Rangers	Loan
(Scotland) Ross Stewart	(Scotland) St Mirren	Free
(Albania) Egli Kaja	(England) AFC Wimbledon	Loan
(England) James Brown	(England) Millwall	Loan
(Scotland) Steven Lawless	(Scotland) Partick Thistle	Free
(Scotland) Scott Tiffoney	(Scotland) Greenock Morton	Undisclosed
(Togo) Steve Lawson	(Switzerland) Neuchâtel Xamax FCS	Free
(Angola) Dolly Menga	(England) Blackpool	Free
(Northern Ireland) Bobby Burns	(Scotland) Heart of Midlothian	Loan
(Netherlands) Henk van Schaik	(Netherlands) FC Twente	Free
(Scotland) Gregg Wylde	(England) Plymouth Argyle	Free
(Scotland) Chris Erskine	(Scotland) Partick Thistle	Undisclosed
(Northern Ireland) Ciaron Brown	(Wales) Cardiff City	Loan
(Australia) Lyndon Dykes	(Scotland) Queen of the South	Undisclosed
(England) Hakeem Odoffin	(England) Northampton Town	Undisclosed

=== Out ===
Player	To	Fee
(Scotland) Josh Mullin	(Scotland) Ross County	Free
(Scotland) Gregor Buchanan	(Scotland) Greenock Morton	Free
(Scotland) Neil Alexander	(Scotland) Dundee United (Note: Joined Dundee United as Goalkeeping Coach.)	Retired
(Scotland) Jackson Longridge	(Scotland) Dunfermline Athletic	Free
(Scotland) Dylan Mackin	(Scotland) Falkirk	Undisclosed
(Scotland) Scott Tiffoney	(Scotland) Greenock Morton	Loan
(Scotland) Callum Crane	(Scotland) Raith Rovers	Loan
(Scotland) Cameron Blues	(Scotland) Brechin City	Loan
(Scotland) Steven Saunders	(Scotland) Partick Thistle	Undisclosed
(Scotland) Matthew Knox	(Scotland) Berwick Rangers	Loan
(Australia) Lyndon Dykes	(Scotland) Queen of the South	Loan
(Scotland) Jack McMillan	(Scotland) Partick Thistle	Loan
(Scotland) Jack Hamilton	(Scotland) Alloa Athletic	Loan
(Netherlands) Henk van Schaik	(Scotland) Dumbarton	Loan
(Scotland) Nicky Cadden	(Scotland) Ayr United	Loan
(Scotland) Cameron Blues	(Scotland) Berwick Rangers	Loan

== See also ==
- List of Livingston F.C. seasons
