= Gianluca Galasso =

Italian footballer

Personal information
- Date of birth: 18 January 1973 (age 53)
- Place of birth: Latina, Italy
- Height: 1.81 m (5 ft 11 1/2 in)
- Position: Right back

Youth career
- 1992–2004: Roma

Senior career*
| Years | Team | Apps | (Gls) |
| 2004–2007 | Roma | 1 | (0) |
| 2004–2005 | → Salernitana (loan) | 25 | (1) |
| 2005–2006 | → Ternana (loan) | 33 | (2) |
| 2006–2007 | → Frosinone (loan) | 25 | (0) |
| 2007–2011 | Bari | 61 | (5) |
| 2009–2010 | → Salernitana (loan) | 20 | (0) |
| 2011–2012 | Triestina | 19 | (0) |

International career
| 2003 | Italy U20 | 2 | (0) |
- * Club domestic league appearances and goals

Gianluca Galasso (born 18 January 1984) is an Italian footballer who plays as a right back.

== Career ==
=== Roma ===
Born in Lazio region, Galasso started his professional career at capital club AS Roma. He played his first Serie A match on the last match-day of the 2003–04 season, his team having already established second position in the league prior to the game. In July 2004, he was loaned to Salernitana to gain experience at Serie B. Although finished as mid-table with team, the team relegated due to financial problems. In August 2005, he was loaned to Ternana at Serie B, with option to buy for €100,000 with counter-option. This time Galasso first tasted relegation due to finished at the bottoms. However Ternana decided to buy Galasso outright but Roma paid €100,000 in net back to Ternana to cancel the buy option. On 31 August 2006, the last day of transfer windows, he was signed by Frosinone of Serie B, for €125,000.

=== Bari ===
In July 2007, AS Bari of Serie B signed him in co-ownership deal, for €180,000. Galasso played his 100th Serie B match at Bari, and won Serie B champion in 2009. In June 2009 Roma gave up the remain registration rights to Bari. But he was excluded in Bari's Serie A plan. In mid-2009, he was loaned to Salernitana along with team-mate Giuseppe Statella and Francesco Caputo. But he played as fullback.

In June 2011 he was released by AS Bari.

== Honours ==
Bari

- Serie B: 2008–09
