= Alessio Cerci =

Italian footballer (born 1987)

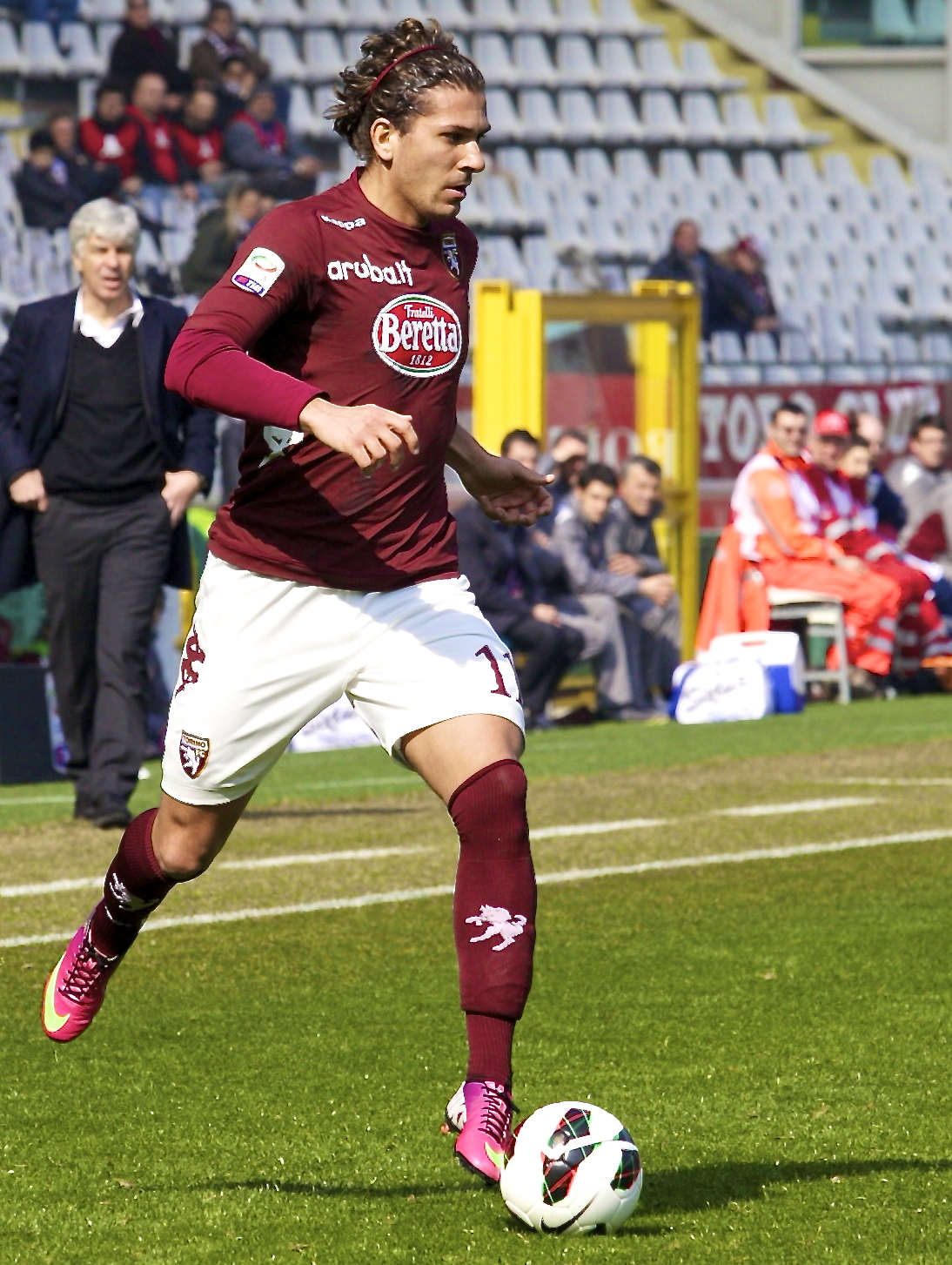
- Cerci playing for Torino in 2013

Personal information
- Full name: Alessio Cerci
- Date of birth: 23 July 1987 (age 39)
- Place of birth: Velletri, Italy
- Height: 1.80 m (5 ft 11 in)
- Position: Winger

Youth career
- 2002–2006: Roma

Senior career*
Years	Team	Apps	(Gls)
2003–2010	Roma	13	(0)
2006–2007	→ Brescia (loan)	21	(0)
2007–2008	→ Pisa (loan)	26	(10)
2008–2009	→ Atalanta (loan)	13	(0)
2010–2012	Fiorentina	47	(12)
2012–2014	Torino	71	(21)
2014–2017	Atlético Madrid	7	(0)
2015–2016	→ AC Milan (loan)	29	(1)
2016	→ Genoa (loan)	11	(4)
2017–2018	Verona	24	(3)
2018–2019	Ankaragücü	12	(1)
2019–2020	Salernitana	10	(0)
2020–2021	Arezzo	15	(0)
Total		299	(52)

International career
2013–2014	Italy	14	(0)
Medal record
Men's Football
Representing Italy
FIFA Confederations Cup
Third place	2013 Brazil
- * Club domestic league appearances and goals

Alessio Cerci (Italian pronunciation: [aˈlɛssjo ˈtʃɛrtʃi]; born 23 July 1987) is an Italian former professional footballer who played as a winger.

Cerci started his professional football career at Roma, playing four times for the first team before serving periods on loan at Brescia, Pisa and Atalanta. He returned to Roma in 2009, where he sporadically played under Claudio Ranieri and was sold to Fiorentina in August 2010. After two seasons in Florence, he transferred to Torino in June 2012. In September 2014, he was sold to Atlético Madrid, before returning to Italy to play for AC Milan and Genoa.

Internationally, Cerci has represented Italy from under-16 to under-21 youth levels. He made his senior international debut in March 2013 a friendly match against Brazil and was included in their squads for that year's Confederations Cup and the following year's World Cup, winning a bronze medal in the former competition.

== Club career ==
=== Roma ===
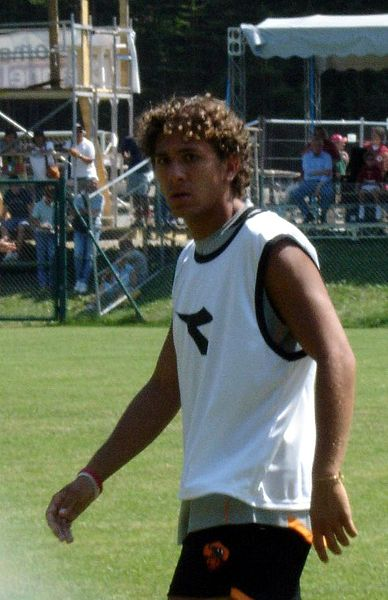
Cerci with Roma in 2006

Cerci grew up playing football in Valmontone before joining the Roma youth system. At this time, he was nicknamed "l'Henry di Valmontone" ("the Thierry Henry of Valmontone") due to his playing style. On 16 May 2004, he made his debut in Serie A at the age of 16 under Fabio Capello in the 76th minute against Sampdoria, ending 0–0. The following season, he was a key player in the Roma under-19 side that won the Campionato Primavera 2004–05. With the first team, he made an additional two appearances, playing the final minutes against Internazionale and Cagliari.

On 21 March 2005, Cerci signed his first professional contract with Roma for three years. However, he mostly continued to play with the youth team (winning the second edition of the Wojtyła Cup) and making just one appearance for the first team against Chievo on 30 April 2006.

==== Brescia, Pisa and Atalanta ====
On 18 August 2006, Cerci was loaned to Brescia in Serie B. He made his debut in the cadets on 15 September in a 1–1 draw against Bari. He played 21 times for Brescia (mostly as a substitute), helping the team finish the season in sixth place.

Cerci returned to Roma at the end of the season, before being loaned to Pisa in 2007. Pisa was then a newly promoted side in Serie B and coached by Gian Piero Ventura, who quickly made Cerci a starter in his formation against Bari and Frosinone. On 9 September 2007, Cerci scored his first official goal, in a 1–2 victory away to Cesena. On 25 September, he scored again against Triestina before repeating himself against Treviso, Ascoli and AlbinoLeffe. On 30 October 2007, he scored the first brace of his career during a 3–3 draw to Modena, scoring another two against Cesena on 9 February 2008.

On 12 February, however, he suffered a knee injury against his former club Brescia that sidelined him for two months. He returned on 12 April, but after just seven days back, was stretchered off the field after a bad fall. Magnetic resonance imaging highlighted that Cerci had broken his meniscus and had inflammation to his anterior cruciate ligament. On 26 April 2008, he was operated on in Rome by the same doctor that had operated on Francesco Totti just days before, sidelining him for four months. His first season was ended prematurely with ten goals in 26 appearances, along with seven assists.

Returning to Roma, Cerci was prepared to stay in the capital to play in Serie A, but on 25 July 2008, was loaned out to Atalanta for €250,000 with the right to purchase the player in co-ownership for €2.75 million. Cerci once again selected the number 11 shirt, making his debut for the Nerazzurri against Chievo. However, numerous injuries throughout the season limited him just to 11 appearances with no goals scored.

==== Return to Roma ====
Cerci returned to play for Roma in the 2009–10 season, scoring his first official goal for the club on 27 August 2009, a 4–0 victory against Košice in the UEFA Europa League playoffs (7–1 on aggregate). In the league, Cerci played the first four matches against Genoa, Juventus, Catania and Napoli, but Claudio Ranieri would later bench him and mostly play him in the Europa League. On 16 December 2009, he scored a brace during CSKA Sofia–Roma (0–3), the final match of the group stages. He made a further appearance for the club in the second round against Greek side Panathinaikos, providing an assist in the first round for David Pizarro. Cerci finished the season with a total of 19 appearances for Roma in Europe and Serie A, with three goals.

=== Fiorentina ===
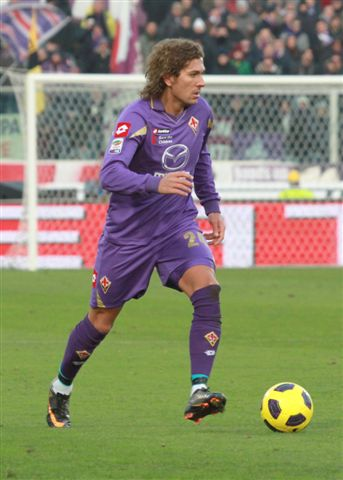
Cerci playing for Fiorentina in 2011

On 26 August 2010, Fiorentina signed Cerci outright from Roma for €4 million to be paid over the next three seasons.

Cerci made his debut for Fiorentina in the 29 August 2010 match against Napoli, ending 1–1, and scored his first goal in Serie A on 7 November 2010 against Chievo (1–0). Near the end of the season, Cerci scored six goals in five games, with two braces. He concluded the season with 26 appearances and seven goals in the league, plus one goal in Coppa Italia against Reggina. However, Cerci had a difficult rapport with Fiorentina and its supporters. During his time at Florence, he was accused of overindulging in the city nightlife and was famous for illegally parking his Maserati around the city centre. On one occasion, he was fined for refusing to move his car after he parked it in a space reserved for police.

In the summer of 2011, Cerci became the focus of a transfer to Manchester City under the direct request of its manager, Roberto Mancini. Just as the deal seemed imminent, however, Cerci decided to stay in Florence, having resolved his issue with the fans.

In the 2011–12 season, Cerci scored his first goal during Coppa Italia against Cittadella (2–1), and the first of two goals against Bologna (2–0) in the opening round of the league. He repeated himself against Parma, Lazio and Lecce, but erratic performances and a difficult relationship with the fans called into question his permanence in Florence.

=== Torino ===
On 23 August 2012, Cerci was sold to Torino under a co-ownership agreement for €2.5 million. At Turin, he was reunited with Gian Piero Ventura, who had already coached him at Pisa. He made his debut for Torino on 1 September 2012 against Pescara, and 30 September 2012 was a key player against Atalanta, with three assists created. He scored his first goal for the Granata on 25 November, producing the first goal in a 2–2 draw against Fiorentina. On 13 January 2013, he scored his second goal of the season in a 3–2 home victory to Siena. He repeated himself in the next round, scoring the 2–0 away against Pescara. He scored his fourth goal for Torino on 17 February, a match won 2–1 against Atalanta.

He concluded his first season at Torino with eight goals and eight assists, also scoring in the final two matches of the 2012–13 season against Chievo and Catania.

On 20 June 2013, the co-ownership agreement between Torino and Fiorentina was resolved in favour of Torino for €3.8 million, confirming him for the next season, and taking Marko Bakić permanently to Fiorentina.

For the 2013–14 season, Gian Piero Ventura began fielding Cerci as a second striker rather than a right winger, a role in which he began to score with greater continuity. He scored his first goal of the season in the opening round against Sassuolo, won 2–0. He scored again in September against Bologna and Milan, before scoring his first brace for Torino against Hellas Verona on 25 September. He scored again on 6 October in a 2–2 draw away to Sampdoria, also providing two assists and a goal against Livorno on 30 October. On 3 November, Cerci ended Roma's record ten-match winning streak, scoring the 1–1 at home for Torino.

On 22 December, Cerci ended his mini goal drought, scoring the 4–1 against Chievo, also providing two assists. On 26 January 2014, he scored a decisive penalty against Atalanta to give Torino the win 1–0, and on 17 February, scored the second Torino goal in a 3–1 win away to Hellas Verona, breaking his personal record for goals scored during his season at Pisa. With teammate Ciro Immobile suspended, Cerci was the difference in a 2–1 against Cagliari, assisting the first goal and scoring the second on 30 March. On 13 April, Immobile and Cerci scored in stoppage time, Cerci with the last kick of the match, to secure a 2–1 win against Genoa. However, on the last match–day of the season, Torino initially missed out on an UEFA Europa League playoff spot to Parma in sixth–place when Cerci missed a decisive injury–time penalty in a 2–2 away draw against his former club Fiorentina. Nevertheless, Parma failed to obtain a UEFA licence, which meant that Torino, who finished seventh in Serie A, progressed to the third qualifying round of the 2014–15 Europa League in their place. This was the first time in 20 years that Torino had qualified for an UEFA club competition, with their last participation occurring in the 1993–94 European Cup Winners' Cup. Cerci ended his season with 13 goals and also 11 assists, the most in Serie A.

=== Atlético Madrid ===
On 1 September 2014, Cerci signed a three-year deal with La Liga title holders Atlético Madrid for a transfer fee believed to be around €16 million. He debuted for the club 19 days later, replacing Raúl Jiménez for the final eight minutes of a 2–2 home draw against Celta de Vigo. Alessio Cerci scored his first goal for the club in a 5–0 win over Malmö FF in the Champions League. On 4 October, after coming on as a second-half substitute in a 3–1 defeat at Valencia, he was sent off for handball. The decision was taken to terminate Cerci's contract on 30 June 2017.

==== Loans to AC Milan and Genoa ====
On 5 January 2015, Cerci returned to Serie A to join AC Milan on an 18-month-long loan deal. On the same day the loan was agreed, Fernando Torres went the opposite way to Atlético in exchange. Cerci made his debut the next day in a 2–1 defeat at the hands of Sassuolo. He scored his first goal as a Milan player on 4 April 2015 in a 2–1 away win against Palermo.

On 22 January 2016, Cerci was loaned to Genoa. He scored 4 goals in 11 Serie B games.

=== Verona ===
On 10 July 2017, Cerci was signed by Verona.

=== Ankaragücü ===
On 17 August 2018, Cerci signed a three-year contract with Ankaragücü.

=== Salernitana ===
On 7 August 2019, Cerci signed with Serie B club Salernitana.

=== Arezzo ===
On 9 October 2020, Cerci signed for Serie C club Arezzo. In March 2021, he was banned from training by the club after an altercation during training. On 23 April 2021, his contract was terminated by mutual consent.

== International career ==
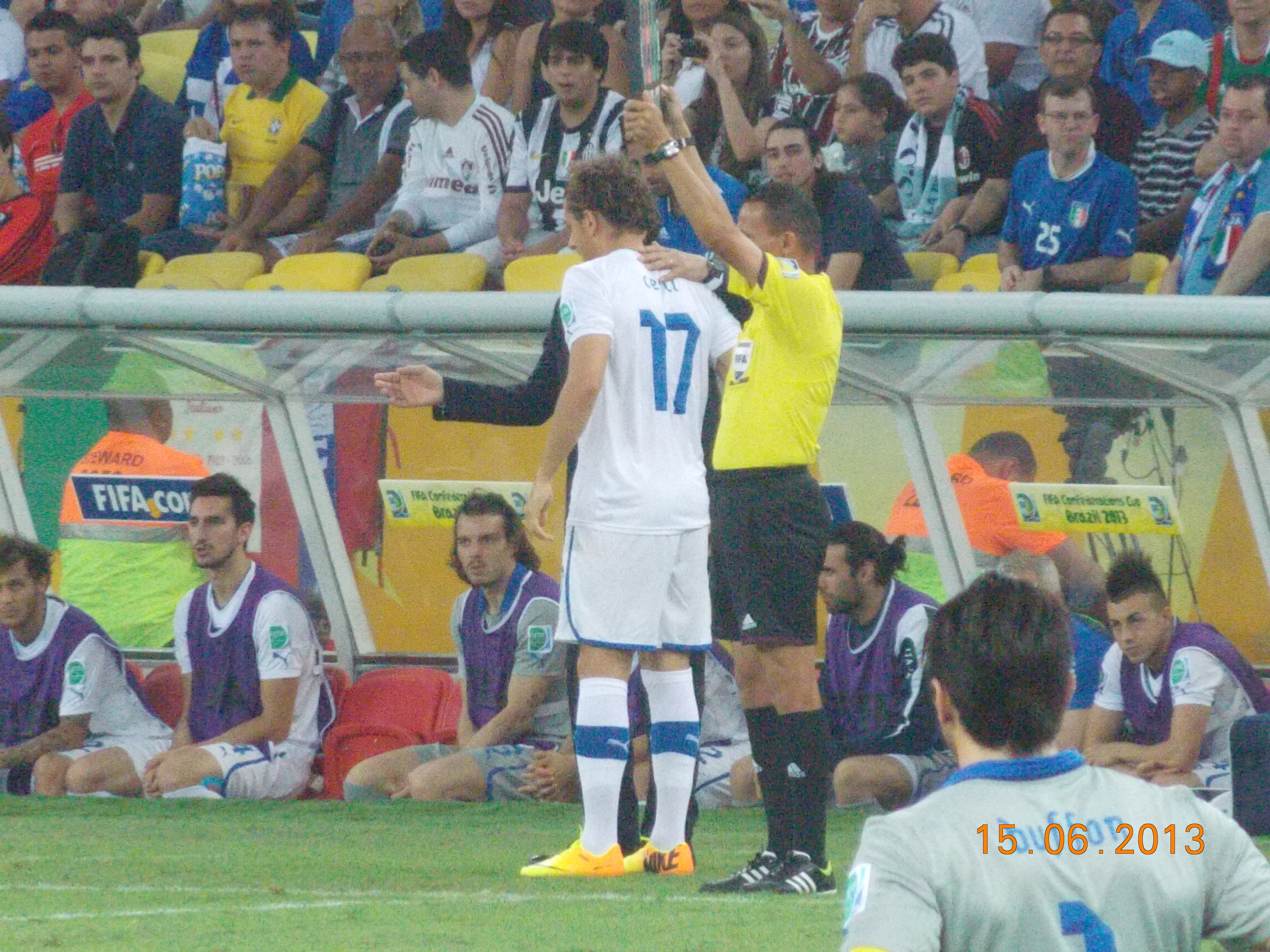
Cerci with Italy at the 2013 FIFA Confederations Cup

He played in all the Italian national youth teams, from Italy U-16 to Italy U-21.

After his positive start to the season at Pisa, Cerci was called up to the Italy under-21 by coach Pierluigi Casiraghi.

On 17 March 2013, Cerci was called up for the first time to the Italian senior squad by Cesare Prandelli for a friendly match against Brazil and 2014 FIFA World Cup qualification against Malta. He debuted in the latter match on 21 March, replacing Andrea Pirlo in the 46th minute of a 2–2 draw with Brazil in Geneva. On 16 May 2013, Cerci was included in the list of 31 provisional players ahead of the 2013 FIFA Confederations Cup in Brazil, with his place confirmed in the final list submitted on 3 June. He made his only appearance in the competition on 16 June, in Italy's opening group match, a 2–1 victory over Mexico at the Maracanã Stadium, coming on as a second–half substitute for Claudio Marchisio; Italy finished the tournament in third place.

On 11 April 2014, Cerci was included in the list of 30 provisional players by Cesare Prandelli for the 2014 World Cup in Brazil, with his place confirmed in the final 23–man squad on 1 June. He made his only appearance in the tournament in Italy's second group match on 20 June, a 1–0 defeat to Costa Rica, coming on as a substitute for Marchisio in the second half; Italy ultimately suffered a first–round exit.

== Style of play ==
Cerci is a naturally left footed player, with excellent technique, vision and remarkable quickness, playing mainly as a winger or as an attacking midfielder on the flank. He can play on both wings, but prefers the right, from which he can cut inside and shoot or provide crosses and assists with his stronger foot. His playing style has drawn comparisons to Arjen Robben.

During the 2013–14 Serie A season with Torino, he began to be used regularly in a creative, supporting role as a second striker, alongside the club's more offensive–minded centre-forward or striker Ciro Immobile. He was also used as an outright forward on occasion under Torino manager Gian Piero Ventura.

== Career statistics ==
=== Club ===
Club	Season	League			National cup (Note: Includes Coppa Italia, Copa del Rey, Turkish Cup)		Europe		Total	
Club	Season	Division	Apps	Goals	Apps	Goals	Apps	Goals	Apps	Goals
Roma	2003–04	Serie A	1	0	—		—		1	0
Roma	2004–05	Serie A	2	0	0	0	0	0	2	0
Roma	2005–06	Serie A	1	0	1	0	0	0	2	0
Roma	2009–10	Serie A	9	0	2	0	8 (Note: Appearances in UEFA Europa League)	3	19	3
Roma	Total		13	0	3	0	8	3	24	3
Brescia (loan)	2006–07	Serie B	21	0	2	0	—		23	0
Pisa (loan)	2007–08	Serie B	26	10	2	0	—		28	10
Atalanta (loan)	2008–09	Serie A	13	0	1	0	—		14	0
Fiorentina	2010–11	Serie A	24	7	3	1	—		27	8
Fiorentina	2011–12	Serie A	23	5	3	3	—		26	8
Fiorentina	Total		47	12	6	4	—		53	16
Torino	2012–13	Serie A	35	8	—		—		35	8
Torino	2013–14	Serie A	36	13	1	0	—		37	13
Torino	Total		71	21	1	0	—		72	21
Atlético Madrid	2014–15	La Liga	6	0	1	0	2 (Note: Appearances in UEFA Champions League)	1	9	1
Atlético Madrid	2016–17	La Liga	1	0	1	0	0	0	2	0
Atlético Madrid	Total		7	0	2	0	2	1	11	1
Milan (loan)	2014–15	Serie A	16	1	2	0	—		18	1
Milan (loan)	2015–16	Serie A	13	0	2	0	—		15	0
Milan (loan)	Total		29	1	4	0	—		33	1
Genoa (loan)	2015–16	Serie A	11	4	0	0	—		11	4
Hellas Verona	2017–18	Serie A	24	3	1	0	—		25	3
Ankaragücü	2018–19	Süper Lig	12	1	4	4	—		16	5
Salernitana	2019–20	Serie B	10	0	0	0	–		10	0
Arezzo	2020–21	Serie C	15	0	0	0	–		15	0
Career total			299	52	26	8	10	4	335	64

=== International ===
As of match played on 16 June 2015.

Italy
Year	Apps	Goals
2013	9	0
2014	5	0
Total	14	0

== Honours ==
Roma Youth

- Campionato Nazionale Primavera: 2004–05

Italy

- FIFA Confederations Cup third place: 2013
