= Raffaele De Martino =

Italian footballer (born 1986)

Personal information
- Date of birth: April 8, 1986 (age 40)
- Place of birth: Nocera Inferiore, Italy
- Height: 1.81 m (5 ft 11 in)
- Position: Defensive midfielder

Team information
- Current team: Paganese

Senior career*
Years	Team	Apps	(Gls)
2004–2005	Roma	5	(0)
2005–2006	Bellinzona	11	(0)
2005–2006	→ Treviso (loan)	14	(0)
2006–2008	Udinese	18	(1)
2008–2009	Avellino	27	(0)
2009–2010	Crotone	23	(0)
2011	Nocerina	3	(0)
2012–	Paganese	0	(0)

International career
2003–2004	Italy U18	4	(0)
2003–2005	Italy U19	14	(0)
2005–2006	Italy U20	5	(0)
2006–2007	Italy U21	2	(0)
- * Club domestic league appearances and goals as of 27 July 2011

Raffaele De Martino (born 8 April 1986) is an Italian football midfielder, currently under contract for Paganese.

== Career ==
De Martino started his professional career with Roma. In January 2005, he was released by Roma and successively signed by Sthe wiss club Bellinzona. Later the same year, he was loaned back to Treviso of Serie A, together with Andrea Russotto. In 2006, he signed a contract with Udinese, scoring his first top-flight goal but missing the whole 2007–08 season due to injury. That was the beginning of De Martino's downward spiral, as he was sold to Serie B club Avellino in 2008, and then failed to establish as a regular; a one-year stint at Crotone turned out to be as disappointing, as he was released by the end of the season. In January 2011, he signed a six-month deal with Lega Pro Prima Divisione club Nocerina, appearing only three times and not being awarded a new contract. Again, without a contract, De Martino found a club only in February 2012, when Lega Pro Seconda Divisione club Paganese confirmed to have signed the player.

=== Internationals ===
He made his U-21 team debut against Luxembourg U-21, 12 December 2006, as a starter.
