= Marco Migliorini =

Italian footballer

Personal information
- Date of birth: 3 January 1992 (age 34)
- Place of birth: Peschiera del Garda, Italy
- Height: 1.94 m (6 ft 4 1/2 in)
- Position: Centre back

Youth career
- 2008–2011: Chievo

Senior career*
Years	Team	Apps	(Gls)
2011	Brno	5	(0)
2011–2012	Chieti	30	(3)
2012–2013	Torino	0	(0)
2013–2014	Como	10	(0)
2015–2016	Juve Stabia	33	(1)
2016–2018	Avellino	43	(0)
2018–2020	Salernitana	53	(1)
2020–2021	Novara	23	(1)
2021–2022	Gubbio	15	(1)
2022	Sambenedettese	7	(0)

International career
2012	Italy U20 Lega Pro	2	(0)
- * Club domestic league appearances and goals

Marco Migliorini (born 3 January 1992) is an Italian former footballer who played as a centre back. He is a former Italy U20 Lega Pro international.

== Club career ==
Born in Peschiera del Garda, the Province of Verona, Veneto, Migliorini started his career at A.C. ChievoVerona. He was a member of the U17 team in the 2008–09 season. He spent one and a half seasons with the reserve team from 2009 to January 2011. On 15 January 2011, Migliorini left for Brno.

=== Chieti ===
On 11 October 2011 Italian fourth division club Chieti completed the bureaucracy to sign Migliorini. Migliorini immediately played in the round 9. In total, he only missed 4 times out of a possible 34 matches (rounds 9 to 42) in the 2011–12 season, including one due to a fourth caution. That season he was also selected to the representatives of second division group B, losing to first division A in 2012 Lega Pro Quadrangular Tournament. In April 2012, he was included in Italy U20 Lega Pro team for a youth tournament in Dubai, beating Al-Shabab in the final. He also played the postseason match against San Marino, winning 8–0.

=== Torino ===
On 7 July 2012, Serie A newcomer Torino F.C. signed Migliorini outright, for €280,000 in a 3-year contract. He wore no.53 shirt for the first team. However, he struggled to get into the side due to the form of Italian International Angelo Ogbonna and Polish International Kamil Glik who were the club's regular centre backs.

=== Como ===
On 4 January 2013, Migliorini was sold to Calcio Como from Turin, with Simone Maugeri moved from Como to Piedmont.

Migliorini missed the first half of the 2013–14 Lega Pro Prima Divisione season due to injury. On 1 February 2014, the contract was terminated by mutual consent.

=== Juve Stabia ===
On 15 June 2014, he was signed by Manager Giuseppe Pancaro for Juve Stabia in a 2-year contract. He impressed in his first season at the club leading the club to a 3rd-place finish in Lega Pro and reaching the playoffs for Serie B, however Juve Stabia missed out on promotion after losing their playoff match 5–4 on penalties to Bassano Virtus after a 1–1 draw on 17 May 2015.

After speculation linking him with a move to Tottenham Hotspur, on 19 July 2015, Juve Stabia Sporting Director Pasquale Logiudice confirmed that newly promoted Serie A side Carpi F.C. 1909 and English Championship club Leeds United were interested in signing the player.

=== Salernitana ===
In August 2018, he signed with Salernitana.

=== Novara ===
On 4 October 2020 he moved to Novara.

=== Gubbio ===
On 25 August 2021, he joined Gubbio.

== International career ==
In April 2012 he represented Italy U20 Lega Pro team for a youth tournament in Dubai. He also played against San Marino Under 21s, winning 8–0.
