= Andrea Servi =

Italian footballer (1984-2013)

Personal information
- Date of birth: 12 June 1984
- Place of birth: Rome, Italy
- Date of death: 22 August 2013 (aged 29)
- Place of death: Milan, Italy
- Height: 1.85 m (6 ft 1 in)
- Position: Defender

Youth career
- –: Roma

Senior career*
Years	Team	Apps	(Gls)
2004–2005	Salernitana	4	(0)
2005	Vittoria	11	(0)
2005–2007	Giulianova	32	(0)
2007–2009	Sambenedettese	14	(0)
2009	Giacomense	15	(0)
2009–2010	Pro Vasto	25	(2)
2010–2011	Nocerina	6	(1)
2011–2012	Ebolitana	10	(0)
2012–2013	Lupa Roma	5	(0)
Total		122	(3)
- * Club domestic league appearances and goals

Andrea Servi (12 June 1984 – 22 August 2013) was an Italian professional footballer who played as a defender.

== Career ==
Servi was born in Rome. He began his football career with the youth teams of A.S. Roma, before playing at senior level for Salernitana, Vittoria, Giulianova, Sambenedettese, Giacomense, Pro Vasto, Nocerina, Ebolitana and Lupa Roma.

== Death ==
Servi died in Milan of lung cancer at the age of 29.
