= Nicolò Sperotto =

Italian footballer

Personal information
- Date of birth: 30 March 1992 (age 34)
- Place of birth: Biella, Italy
- Height: 1.82 m (6 ft 0 in)
- Position: Left-back

Youth career
- Torino

Senior career*
| Years | Team | Apps | (Gls) |
| 2011–2012 | Torino | 0 | (0) |
| 2011–2012 | → Reggiana (loan) | 21 | (0) |
| 2012–2017 | Carpi | 30 | (0) |
| 2014–2015 | → Cosenza (loan) | 14 | (0) |
| 2015–2016 | → Arezzo (loan) | 5 | (0) |
| 2016 | → Alessandria (loan) | 11 | (1) |
| 2016–2017 | → Como (loan) | 28 | (1) |
| 2017–2018 | Fermana | 27 | (1) |
| 2019–2022 | Fermana | 88 | (0) |
| 2022–2023 | Olbia | 16 | (0) |

Managerial career
- 2023–2024: Città di Cossato
- * Club domestic league appearances and goals as of 23 April 2023

Nicolò Sperotto (born 30 March 1992) is an Italian football coach and former player who played as a left-back.

== Playing career ==
Born in Biella, Sperotto began playing youth football in the capital of Piedmont for Torino. He played in various youth teams before making 19 appearances for the primavera (U19) formation in 2010–11 that was eliminated in the play-offs by Inter Milan (of the same age group) on penalties (2–0). In 2011–12, he was loaned to Lega Pro side Reggiana, making 21 appearances in his first season as a professional footballer.

On 15 July 2012, he was sold to Carpi, also in Lega Pro, under a co-ownership deal. He made 29 appearances for the Biancorossi, who were promoted to Serie B in 2012–13. On 20 June 2013, the co-ownership agreement between Torino and Carpi was renewed. On 14 December 2013 Sperotto made his Serie B debut, starting in a 2–2 draw at Bari. He ended 2013–14 with six appearances in the second division.

On 21 June 2014, the co-ownership agreement was renewed for an additional year. In the 2014–2015 season playing for Cosenza.

In the summer of 2015, he moved to Arezzo; later in October, his name made national news after having recorded and published an angry locker room speech by head coach Ezio Capuano after Arezzo suffered a defeat in a friendly midweek game against an amateur team. This led to Capuano eventually excluding him from the squad and him being released by mutual consent later in November 2015. He subsequently joined Alessandria in January 2016 as a free agent. The season after, he signed for Como.

After spending the second half of 2018 without a team, he returned to Fermana on 8 January 2019, signing a 1.5-year contract.

On 22 December 2022, he joined Olbia until the end of the 2022–23 season.

== Coaching career ==
On 5 December 2023, Sperotto was announced as the new head coach of Eccellenza Piedmont club Città di Cossato. He was sacked on 17 March 2024, leaving his club in last place in the league table.
