= 2005–06 Ternana Calcio season =

Ternana Calcio
2005–06 season
- Chairman: Giorgio Lugaresi
- Manager: Antonio Sala; Fabio Brini; Domenico Caso
- Stadium: Stadio Libero Liberati
- Serie B: 20th
- Coppa Italia: Second round

The 2005–06 season was the 81st season in the existence of Ternana Calcio and the club's eighth consecutive season in the second division of Italian football. In addition to the domestic league, Ternana participated in this season's edition of the Coppa Italia.

== Competitions ==
=== Overall record ===
Competition	First match	Last match	Starting round	Final position	Record							
Competition	First match	Last match	Starting round	Final position	Pld	W	D	L	GF	GA	GD	Win %
Serie B	27 August 2005	28 May 2006	Matchday 1	20th	42	7	18	17	36	58	−22	16.67
Coppa Italia	7 August 2005	14 August 2005	First round	Second round	2	1	1	0	2	1	+1	50.00
Total					44	8	19	17	38	59	−21	18.18

Source: Competitions

=== Serie B ===
==== League table ====
Pos	Team	Pld	W	D	L	GF	GA	GD	Pts	Promotion or relegation
18	AlbinoLeffe (O)	42	10	16	16	38	52	−14	46	Qualification to relegation play-offs
19	Avellino (R)	42	11	13	18	42	62	−20	46	Qualification to relegation play-offs
20	Ternana (R)	42	7	18	17	36	58	−22	39	Relegation to Serie C1
21	Cremonese (R)	42	6	12	24	36	60	−24	30	Relegation to Serie C1
22	Catanzaro (R, E, R)	42	7	7	28	26	63	−37	28	Relegation to Serie C2 (Note: Relegated and then restored directly in Serie C2 by the Lodo Petrucci for financial problems.)

Source: Almanacco Illustrato del Calcio 2007, Panini Edizioni, Modena, November 2006
Rules for classification: 1) points; 2) head-to-head points; 3) head-to-head goal difference; 4) head-to-head goals scored; 5) goal difference; 6) number of goals scored.
(E) Eliminated; (O) Play-off winners; (R) Relegated

==== Results by round ====
Round	1	2	3	4	5	6	7	8	9	10	11	12	13	14	15	16	17	18	19	20	21
Ground	A	H	A	H	A	H	A	H	A	H	A	A	H	A	H	A	H	H	A	H	A
Result	L	W	L	D	L	L	L	D	L	D	L	L	D	W	D	W	D	W	D	D	D
Position	19	13	20	19	19	22	22	21	21	22	22	22	21	20	19	18	18	18	18	18	18

Source: Serie B
A = Away; H = Home; W = Win; D = Draw; L = Loss

==== Matches ====
27 August 2005 1	Bari	2–0	Ternana	Bari
--:-- CEST (UTC+2)				Stadium: Stadio San Nicola

4 September 2005 2	Ternana	1–0	AlbinoLeffe	Terni
--:-- CEST (UTC+2)				Stadium: Stadio Libero Liberati

12 September 2005 4	Ternana	2–2	Pescara	Terni
--:-- CEST (UTC+2)				Stadium: Stadio Libero Liberati

17 September 2005 5	Arezzo	3–1	Ternana	Arezzo
--:-- CEST (UTC+2)				Stadium: Stadio Città di Arezzo

20 September 2005 6	Ternana	0–3	Cesena	Terni
--:-- CEST (UTC+2)				Stadium: Stadio Libero Liberati

24 September 2005 7	Atalanta	2–0	Ternana	Bergamo
--:-- CEST (UTC+2)				Stadium: Stadio Atleti Azzurri d'Italia

1 October 2005 8	Ternana	1–1	Modena	Terni
--:-- CEST (UTC+2)				Stadium: Stadio Libero Liberati

5 October 2005 3	Triestina	2–0	Ternana	Trieste
--:-- CEST (UTC+2)				Stadium: Stadio Nereo Rocco

9 October 2005 9	Hellas Verona	1–0	Ternana	Verona
--:-- CEST (UTC+2)

15 October 2005 10	Ternana	0–0	Torino	Terni
--:-- CEST (UTC+2)				Stadium: Stadio Libero Liberati

22 October 2005 11	Vicenza	2–1	Ternana	Vicenza
--:-- CEST (UTC+2)

26 October 2005 12	Piacenza	4–0	Ternana	Piacenza
--:-- CEST (UTC+2)

29 October 2005 13	Ternana	0–0	Catania	Terni
--:-- CEST (UTC+2)				Stadium: Stadio Libero Liberati

5 November 2005 14	Catanzaro	0–1	Ternana	Catanzaro
--:-- CET (UTC+1)

13 November 2005 15	Ternana	1–1	Crotone	Terni
--:-- CET (UTC+1)				Stadium: Stadio Libero Liberati

19 November 2005 16	Bologna	1–3	Ternana	Bologna
--:-- CET (UTC+1)

26 November 2005 17	Ternana	1–1	Mantova	Terni
--:-- CET (UTC+1)				Stadium: Stadio Libero Liberati

2 December 2005 18	Ternana	2–1	Rimini	Terni
--:-- CET (UTC+1)				Stadium: Stadio Libero Liberati

10 December 2005 19	Brescia	0–0	Ternana	Brescia
--:-- CET (UTC+1)

17 December 2005 20	Ternana	1–1	Cremonese	Terni
--:-- CET (UTC+1)				Stadium: Stadio Libero Liberati

20 December 2005 21	Avellino	1–1	Ternana	Avellino
--:-- CET (UTC+1)				Stadium: Stadio Partenio

28 May 2006 42	Ternana	0–2	Avellino	Terni
--:-- CET (UTC+1)				Stadium: Stadio Libero Liberati

=== Coppa Italia ===
7 August 2005 First round	Lumezzane	1–2	Ternana	Lumezzane
--:-- CEST (UTC+2)

14 August 2005 Second round	Cittadella	0–0 (a.e.t.) (7–6 p)	Ternana	Cittadella
--:-- CEST (UTC+2)
