= 2005–06 US Cremonese season =

U.S. Cremonese
2005–06 season
- President: Luigi Gualco
- Head coach: Giorgio Roselli; Giovanni Dellacasa
- Stadium: Stadio Giovanni Zini
- Serie B: 21st (relegated)
- Coppa Italia: Second round

The 2005–06 season was the 103rd season in the existence of U.S. Cremonese and the club's first season back in the second division of Italian football. In addition to the domestic league, Cremonese participated in this season's edition of the Coppa Italia.

== Competitions ==
=== Overall record ===
Competition	First match	Last match	Starting round	Final position	Record							
Competition	First match	Last match	Starting round	Final position	Pld	W	D	L	GF	GA	GD	Win %
Serie B	4 September 2005	May 2006	Matchday 1	21st	42	6	12	24	36	60	−24	14.29
Coppa Italia	7 August 2005	14 August 2005	First round	Second round	2	1	0	1	4	3	+1	50.00
Total					44	7	12	25	40	63	−23	15.91

Last updated: May 2006
Source: Competitions

=== Serie B ===
==== League table ====
Pos	Team	Pld	W	D	L	GF	GA	GD	Pts	Promotion or relegation
18	AlbinoLeffe (O)	42	10	16	16	38	52	−14	46	Qualification to relegation play-offs
19	Avellino (R)	42	11	13	18	42	62	−20	46	Qualification to relegation play-offs
20	Ternana (R)	42	7	18	17	36	58	−22	39	Relegation to Serie C1
21	Cremonese (R)	42	6	12	24	36	60	−24	30	Relegation to Serie C1
22	Catanzaro (R, E, R)	42	7	7	28	26	63	−37	28	Relegation to Serie C2 (Note: Relegated and then restored directly in Serie C2 by the Lodo Petrucci for financial problems.)

Source: Almanacco Illustrato del Calcio 2007, Panini Edizioni, Modena, November 2006
Rules for classification: 1) points; 2) head-to-head points; 3) head-to-head goal difference; 4) head-to-head goals scored; 5) goal difference; 6) number of goals scored.
(E) Eliminated; (O) Play-off winners; (R) Relegated

==== Results by round ====
Round	1	2	3	4	5	6	7	8	9	10	11	12	13	14	15	16	17
Ground	A	H	A	H	A	H	A	H	A	A	H	A	H	A	H	A	H
Result	L	W	D	L	L	D	D	L	L	L	L	L	L	L	L	L	L
Position																	

Updated to match(es) played on May 2006. Source: Serie B
A = Away; H = Home; W = Win; D = Draw; L = Loss

==== Matches ====
14 September 2005 1	Brescia	1–0	Cremonese	Brescia
--:-- CEST (UTC+2)

4 September 2005 2	Cremonese	2–0	Catanzaro	Cremona
--:-- CEST (UTC+2)				Stadium: Stadio Giovanni Zini

4 October 2005 3	AlbinoLeffe	0–0	Cremonese	Bergamo
--:-- CEST (UTC+2)

10 September 2005 4	Cremonese	0–2	Hellas Verona	Cremona
--:-- CEST (UTC+2)				Stadium: Stadio Giovanni Zini

17 September 2005 5	Pescara	3–1	Cremonese	Pescara
--:-- CEST (UTC+2)

21 September 2005 6	Cremonese	0–0	Triestina	Cremona
--:-- CEST (UTC+2)				Stadium: Stadio Giovanni Zini

24 September 2005 7	Arezzo	1–1	Cremonese	Arezzo
--:-- CEST (UTC+2)

1 October 2005 8	Cremonese	2–3	Cesena	Cremona
--:-- CEST (UTC+2)				Stadium: Stadio Giovanni Zini

9 October 2005 9	Avellino	2–1	Cremonese	Avellino
--:-- CEST (UTC+2)

15 October 2005 10	Rimini	2–0	Cremonese	Rimini
--:-- CEST (UTC+2)

22 October 2005 11	Cremonese	1–2	Mantova	Cremona
--:-- CEST (UTC+2)				Stadium: Stadio Giovanni Zini

26 October 2005 12	Modena	3–0	Cremonese	Modena
--:-- CEST (UTC+2)

31 October 2005 13	Cremonese	1–2	Piacenza	Cremona
--:-- CET (UTC+1)				Stadium: Stadio Giovanni Zini

5 November 2005 14	Bari	1–0	Cremonese	Bari
--:-- CET (UTC+1)

11 November 2005 15	Cremonese	0–1	Atalanta	Cremona
--:-- CET (UTC+1)				Stadium: Stadio Giovanni Zini

19 November 2005 16	Catania	2–1	Cremonese	Catania
--:-- CET (UTC+1)

27 November 2005 17	Cremonese	2–3	Vicenza	Cremona
--:-- CET (UTC+1)				Stadium: Stadio Giovanni Zini

3 December 2005 18	Bologna	1–1	Cremonese	Bologna
16:05 CET (UTC+1)

10 December 2005 19	Cremonese	2–0	Crotone	Cremona
16:00 CET (UTC+1)				Stadium: Stadio Giovanni Zini

17 December 2005 20	Ternana	1–1	Cremonese	Terni
16:00 CET (UTC+1)

20 December 2005 21	Cremonese	0–1	Torino	Cremona
20:30 CET (UTC+1)				Stadium: Stadio Giovanni Zini

7 January 2006 22	Cremonese	1–1	Brescia	Cremona
16:00 CET (UTC+1)				Stadium: Stadio Giovanni Zini

13 January 2006 23	Catanzaro	1–1	Cremonese	Catanzaro
20:45 CET (UTC+1)

17 January 2006 24	Cremonese	0–0	AlbinoLeffe	Cremona
20:30 CET (UTC+1)				Stadium: Stadio Giovanni Zini

6 May 2006 39	Cremonese	2–2	Bologna	Cremona
CEST (UTC+2)				Stadium: Stadio Giovanni Zini

13 May 2006 40	Crotone	3–1	Cremonese	Crotone
CEST (UTC+2)

21 May 2006 41	Cremonese	2–2	Ternana	Cremona
CEST (UTC+2)				Stadium: Stadio Giovanni Zini

28 May 2006 42	Torino	3–0	Cremonese	Turin
CEST (UTC+2)

=== Coppa Italia ===
First round	Sambenedettese	2–4	Cremonese

Second round	Cremonese	0–1	Chievo
