= 2005–06 Vicenza Calcio season =

Vicenza Calcio
2005–06 season
- Chairman: Sergio Cassingena
- Head coach: Giancarlo Camolese
- Stadium: Stadio Romeo Menti
- Serie B: 16th
- Coppa Italia: First round

The 2005–06 season was the 104th season in the existence of Vicenza Calcio and the club's fifth consecutive season in the second division of Italian football. In addition to the domestic league, Vicenza participated in this season's edition of the Coppa Italia.

== Competitions ==
=== Overall record ===
Competition	First match	Last match	Starting round	Final position	Record							
Competition	First match	Last match	Starting round	Final position	Pld	W	D	L	GF	GA	GD	Win %
Serie B	27 August 2005	May 2006	Matchday 1	16th	42	13	10	19	38	49	−11	30.95
Coppa Italia	7 August 2005		First round	First round	1	0	1	0	0	0	+0	0.00
Total					43	13	11	19	38	49	−11	30.23

Last updated: May 2006
Source: Competitions

=== Serie B ===
==== League table ====
Pos	Team	Pld	W	D	L	GF	GA	GD	Pts	Promotion or relegation
14	Triestina	42	12	15	15	44	51	−7	51	
15	Hellas Verona	42	10	19	13	42	41	+1	49	
16	Vicenza	42	13	10	19	38	49	−11	49	
17	Rimini	42	11	15	16	42	49	−7	48	
18	AlbinoLeffe (O)	42	10	16	16	38	52	−14	46	Qualification to relegation play-offs

Source: Almanacco Illustrato del Calcio 2007, Panini Edizioni, Modena, November 2006
Rules for classification: 1) points; 2) head-to-head points; 3) head-to-head goal difference; 4) head-to-head goals scored; 5) goal difference; 6) number of goals scored.
(O) Play-off winners

==== Results by round ====
Round	1	2	3	4	5	6	7	8	9	10	11	12	13	14	15	16	17
Ground	A	H	A	H	A	H	A	H	A	A	H	A	H	A	H	H	A
Result	D	W	L	L	W	L	L	L	D	L	W	L	D	D	L	W	W
Position																	

Updated to match(es) played on May 2006. Source: Serie B
A = Away; H = Home; W = Win; D = Draw; L = Loss

==== Matches ====
27 August 2005 1	Catanzaro	1–1	Vicenza	Catanzaro
--:-- CEST (UTC+2)

4 September 2005 2	Vicenza	1–0	Cesena	Vicenza
--:-- CEST (UTC+2)

5 October 2005 3	Pescara	3–1	Vicenza	Pescara
--:-- CEST (UTC+2)

10 September 2005 4	Vicenza	1–3	Piacenza	Vicenza
--:-- CEST (UTC+2)

16 September 2005 5	Crotone	0–2	Vicenza	Crotone
--:-- CEST (UTC+2)

20 September 2005 6	Vicenza	0–1	Mantova	Vicenza
--:-- CEST (UTC+2)

24 September 2005 7	Torino	2–0	Vicenza	Turin
--:-- CEST (UTC+2)

30 September 2005 8	Vicenza	0–1	Arezzo	Vicenza
--:-- CEST (UTC+2)

9 October 2005 9	Catania	2–2	Vicenza	Catania
--:-- CEST (UTC+2)

15 October 2005 10	Bologna	4–1	Vicenza	Bologna
--:-- CEST (UTC+2)

22 October 2005 11	Vicenza	2–1	Ternana	Vicenza
--:-- CEST (UTC+2)

26 October 2005 12	Bari	2–1	Vicenza	Bari
--:-- CEST (UTC+2)

29 October 2005 13	Vicenza	3–3	Atalanta	Vicenza
--:-- CEST (UTC+2)

7 November 2005 14	Modena	0–0	Vicenza	Modena
--:-- CET (UTC+1)

13 November 2005 15	Vicenza	0–1	Hellas Verona	Vicenza
--:-- CET (UTC+1)

19 November 2005 16	Vicenza	2–1	Triestina	Vicenza
--:-- CET (UTC+1)

27 November 2005 17	Cremonese	2–3	Vicenza	Cremona
--:-- CET (UTC+1)
