= 2005–06 Bologna FC 1909 season =

Bologna F.C. 1909
2005–06 season
- Chairman: Alfredo Cazzola
- Head coach: Andrea Mandorlini
- Stadium: Stadio Renato Dall'Ara
- Serie B: 8th
- Coppa Italia: Second round
Home colours

The 2005–06 season was the 97th season in the existence of Bologna F.C. 1909 and the club's first season back in the second division of Italian football. In addition to the domestic league, Bologna participated in this season's edition of the Coppa Italia.

== Competitions ==
=== Overall record ===
Competition	First match	Last match	Starting round	Final position	Record							
Competition	First match	Last match	Starting round	Final position	Pld	W	D	L	GF	GA	GD	Win %
Serie B	29 August 2005	May 2006	Matchday 1	8th	42	16	16	10	55	42	+13	38.10
Coppa Italia	7 August 2005	14 August 2005	First round	Second round	2	1	0	1	1	1	+0	50.00
Total					44	17	16	11	56	43	+13	38.64

Last updated: May 2006
Source: Competitions

=== Serie B ===
==== League table ====
Pos	Team	Pld	W	D	L	GF	GA	GD	Pts	Promotion or relegation
6	Cesena	42	18	12	12	66	54	+12	66	Qualification to promotion play-offs
7	Arezzo	42	17	15	10	45	34	+11	66	
8	Bologna	42	16	16	10	55	42	+13	64	
9	Crotone	42	18	9	15	56	48	+8	63	
10	Brescia	42	15	15	12	54	44	+10	60	

Source: Almanacco Illustrato del Calcio 2007, Panini Edizioni, Modena, November 2006
Rules for classification: 1) points; 2) head-to-head points; 3) head-to-head goal difference; 4) head-to-head goals scored; 5) goal difference; 6) number of goals scored.

==== Results summary ====
Overall								Home						Away					
Pld	W	D	L	GF	GA	GD	Pts	W	D	L	GF	GA	GD	W	D	L	GF	GA	GD
0	0	0	0	0	0	0	0	0	0	0	0	0	0	0	0	0	0	0	0

Last updated: May 2006.
Source: Serie B

==== Results by round ====
Round	1	2	3	4	5	6	7	8	9	10	11	12	13	14	15	16
Ground	A	H	A	H	A	H	A	H	A	H	A	A	H	A	H	H
Result	D	W	L	L	D	W	W	L	D	W	D	L	D	L	D	L
Position																

Updated to match(es) played on May 2006. Source: Serie B
A = Away; H = Home; W = Win; D = Draw; L = Loss

==== Matches ====
Win Draw Loss

29 August 2005 1	Triestina	0–0	Bologna	Trieste
--:-- CEST (UTC+2)

5 September 2005 2	Bologna	2–1	Pescara	Bologna
--:-- CEST (UTC+2)

10 September 2005 4	Bologna	1–2	Modena	Bologna
--:-- CEST (UTC+2)

17 September 2005 5	Brescia	1–1	Bologna	Brescia
--:-- CEST (UTC+2)

20 September 2005 6	Bologna	2–1	Piacenza	Bologna
--:-- CEST (UTC+2)

26 September 2005 7	Bari	0–1	Bologna	Bari
--:-- CEST (UTC+2)

1 October 2005 8	Bologna	1–2	Crotone	Bologna
--:-- CEST (UTC+2)

4 October 2005 3	Hellas Verona	3–1	Bologna	Verona
--:-- CEST (UTC+2)

9 October 2005 9	Torino	0–0	Bologna	Turin
--:-- CEST (UTC+2)

15 October 2005 10	Bologna	4–1	Vicenza	Bologna
--:-- CEST (UTC+2)

21 October 2005 11	Catania	1–1	Bologna	Catania
--:-- CEST (UTC+2)

25 October 2005 12	Atalanta	1–0	Bologna	Bergamo
--:-- CEST (UTC+2)

29 October 2005 13	Bologna	1–1	Arezzo	Bologna
--:-- CEST (UTC+2)

5 November 2005 14	Cesena	2–0	Bologna	Cesena
--:-- CET (UTC+1)

14 November 2005 15	Bologna	0–0	Mantova	Bologna
--:-- CET (UTC+1)

19 November 2005 16	Bologna	1–3	Ternana	Bologna
--:-- CET (UTC+1)

20 March 2006 33	Bologna	1–1	Atalanta	Bologna
--:-- CET (UTC+1)

10 April 2006 36	Mantova	0–2	Bologna	Mantua
--:-- CEST (UTC+2)				Stadium: Stadio Danilo Martelli

=== Coppa Italia ===
7 August 2005 First round	Ravenna	0–1	Bologna

13 August 2005 Second round	Cesena	1–0	Bologna
