= 2005–06 Brescia Calcio season =

Brescia Calcio
2005–06 season
- President: Luigi Corioni
- Head coach: Rolando Maran; Zdeněk Zeman
- Stadium: Stadio Mario Rigamonti
- Serie B: 10th
- Coppa Italia: Round of 16

The 2005–06 season was the 95th season in the existence of Brescia Calcio and the club's second consecutive season in the second division of Italian football. In addition to the domestic league, Brescia participated in this season's edition of the Coppa Italia.

== Competitions ==
=== Overall record ===
Competition	First match	Last match	Starting round	Final position	Record							
Competition	First match	Last match	Starting round	Final position	Pld	W	D	L	GF	GA	GD	Win %
Serie B	2 September 2005	28 May 2006	Matchday 1	10th	42	15	15	12	54	44	+10	35.71
Coppa Italia	7 August 2005	11 January 2006	First round	Round of 16	5	2	1	2	8	9	−1	40.00
Total					47	17	16	14	62	53	+9	36.17

Source: Competitions

=== Serie B ===
==== League table ====
Pos	Team	Pld	W	D	L	GF	GA	GD	Pts
8	Bologna	42	16	16	10	55	42	+13	64
9	Crotone	42	18	9	15	56	48	+8	63
10	Brescia	42	15	15	12	54	44	+10	60
11	Pescara	42	14	12	16	41	50	−9	54
12	Piacenza	42	13	15	14	56	52	+4	54

Source: Almanacco Illustrato del Calcio 2007, Panini Edizioni, Modena, November 2006
Rules for classification: 1) points; 2) head-to-head points; 3) head-to-head goal difference; 4) head-to-head goals scored; 5) goal difference; 6) number of goals scored.

==== Results by round ====
Round	1	2	3	4	5	6	7	8	9	10	11	12	13	14	15	16	17
Ground	H	A	H	A	H	H	A	A	H	A	H	A	H	A	H	A	H
Result	W	L	L	W	D	D	D	D	W	W	D	W	D	L	D	W	W
Position																	

Updated to match(es) played on May 2006. Source: Serie B
A = Away; H = Home; W = Win; D = Draw; L = Loss

==== Matches ====
14 September 2005 1	Brescia	1–0	Cremonese	Brescia
--:-- CEST (UTC+2)

2 September 2005 2	Catania	2–1	Brescia	Catania
--:-- CEST (UTC+2)

5 October 2005 3	Brescia	0–2	Rimini	Brescia
--:-- CEST (UTC+2)

9 September 2005 4	Avellino	2–5	Brescia	Avellino
--:-- CEST (UTC+2)

17 September 2005 5	Brescia	1–1	Bologna	Brescia
--:-- CEST (UTC+2)

20 September 2005 6	Brescia	0–0	Arezzo	Brescia
--:-- CEST (UTC+2)

24 September 2005 7	Hellas Verona	0–0	Brescia	Verona
--:-- CEST (UTC+2)

1 October 2005 8	AlbinoLeffe	2–2	Brescia	Bergamo
--:-- CEST (UTC+2)

9 October 2005 9	Brescia	1–0	Triestina	Brescia
--:-- CEST (UTC+2)

15 October 2005 10	Pescara	0–3	Brescia	Pescara
--:-- CEST (UTC+2)

22 October 2005 11	Brescia	2–2	Bari	Brescia
--:-- CEST (UTC+2)

26 October 2005 12	Catanzaro	1–2	Brescia	Catanzaro
--:-- CEST (UTC+2)

31 October 2005 13	Brescia	2–2	Modena	Brescia
--:-- CET (UTC+1)

5 November 2005 14	Mantova	1–0	Brescia	Mantua
--:-- CET (UTC+1)

13 November 2005 15	Brescia	1–1	Piacenza	Brescia
--:-- CET (UTC+1)

19 November 2005 16	Cesena	1–2	Brescia	Cesena
--:-- CET (UTC+1)

26 November 2005 17	Brescia	1–0	Atalanta	Brescia
--:-- CET (UTC+1)

2 April 2006 35	Brescia	0–0	Mantova	Brescia
--:-- CEST (UTC+2)

29 April 2006 38	Atalanta	2–0	Brescia	Bergamo
--:-- CEST (UTC+2)

=== Coppa Italia ===
7 August 2005 First round	Pro Sesto	0–1	Brescia

14 August 2005 Second round	Arezzo	2–2 (a.e.t.) (4–5 p)	Brescia

22 August 2005 Third round	Brescia	1–0	Chievo

29 November 2005 Round of 16; First leg	Milan	3–1	Brescia

11 January 2006 Round of 16; Second leg	Brescia	3–4	Milan
