= 2005–06 Piacenza Calcio season =

Piacenza
2005–06 season
- Chairman: Giorgio Lugaresi
- Head coach: Fabrizio Castori
- Stadium: Stadio Dino Manuzzi
- Serie B: 12th
- Coppa Italia: Third round

The 2005–06 season was the 66th season in the existence of Piacenza Calcio and the club's second consecutive season in the second division of Italian football. In addition to the domestic league, Piacenza participated in this season's edition of the Coppa Italia.

== Competitions ==
=== Overall record ===
Competition	First match	Last match	Starting round	Final position	Record							
Competition	First match	Last match	Starting round	Final position	Pld	W	D	L	GF	GA	GD	Win %
Serie B	4 September 2005	28 May 2006	Matchday 1	12th	42	13	15	14	56	52	+4	30.95
Coppa Italia	7 August 2005	21 August 2005	First round	Third round	3	2	0	1	4	3	+1	66.67
Total					45	15	15	15	60	55	+5	33.33

Source: Competitions

=== Serie B ===
==== League table ====
Pos	Team	Pld	W	D	L	GF	GA	GD	Pts
10	Brescia	42	15	15	12	54	44	+10	60
11	Pescara	42	14	12	16	41	50	−9	54
12	Piacenza	42	13	15	14	56	52	+4	54
13	Bari	42	11	18	13	43	47	−4	51
14	Triestina	42	12	15	15	44	51	−7	51

Source: Almanacco Illustrato del Calcio 2007, Panini Edizioni, Modena, November 2006
Rules for classification: 1) points; 2) head-to-head points; 3) head-to-head goal difference; 4) head-to-head goals scored; 5) goal difference; 6) number of goals scored.

==== Results by round ====
Round	1	2	3	4	5	6	7	8	9	10	11	12	13	14	15	16
Ground	H	A	H	A	H	A	H	A	H	H	A	H	A	H	A	H
Result	D	L	W	W	L	L	W	D	D	D	L	W	W	W	D	D
Position																

Source: Serie B
A = Away; H = Home; W = Win; D = Draw; L = Loss

==== Matches ====
14 September 2005 1	Piacenza	1–1	Catania	Piacenza
--:-- CEST (UTC+2)

4 September 2005 2	Crotone	4–0	Piacenza	Crotone
--:-- CEST (UTC+2)

5 October 2005 3	Piacenza	3–0	Atalanta	Piacenza
--:-- CEST (UTC+2)

10 September 2005 4	Vicenza	1–3	Piacenza	Vicenza
--:-- CEST (UTC+2)

17 September 2005 5	Piacenza	1–3	Mantova	Piacenza
--:-- CEST (UTC+2)

20 September 2005 6	Bologna	2–1	Piacenza	Bologna
--:-- CEST (UTC+2)

26 September 2005 7	Piacenza	1–0	AlbinoLeffe	Piacenza
--:-- CEST (UTC+2)

1 October 2005 8	Bari	1–1	Piacenza	Bari
--:-- CEST (UTC+2)

10 October 2005 9	Piacenza	0–0	Rimini	Piacenza
--:-- CEST (UTC+2)

15 October 2005 10	Piacenza	2–2	Cesena	Piacenza
--:-- CEST (UTC+2)

22 October 2005 11	Torino	2–1	Piacenza	Turin
--:-- CEST (UTC+2)

26 October 2005 12	Piacenza	4–0	Ternana	Piacenza
--:-- CEST (UTC+2)

31 October 2005 13	Cremonese	1–2	Piacenza	Cremona
--:-- CET (UTC+1)

5 November 2005 14	Piacenza	2–0	Avellino	Piacenza
--:-- CET (UTC+1)

13 November 2005 15	Brescia	1–1	Piacenza	Brescia
--:-- CET (UTC+1)

19 November 2005 16	Piacenza	0–0	Pescara	Piacenza
--:-- CET (UTC+1)

27 March 2006 34	Piacenza	2–1	Cremonese	Piacenza
--:-- CEST (UTC+2)

2 April 2006 35	Avellino	1–1	Piacenza	Avellino
--:-- CEST (UTC+2)

8 April 2006 36	Piacenza	3–1	Brescia	Piacenza
--:-- CEST (UTC+2)

23 April 2006 37	Pescara	1–0	Piacenza	Pescara
--:-- CEST (UTC+2)

29 April 2006 38	Piacenza	4–3	Catanzaro	Piacenza
--:-- CEST (UTC+2)

6 May 2006 39	Hellas Verona	1–0	Piacenza	Verona
--:-- CEST (UTC+2)

13 May 2006 40	Piacenza	3–4	Triestina	Piacenza
--:-- CEST (UTC+2)

21 May 2006 41	Modena	1–0	Piacenza	Modena
--:-- CEST (UTC+2)

28 May 2006 42	Piacenza	2–3	Arezzo	Piacenza
--:-- CEST (UTC+2)
