= 2005–06 Calcio Catania season =

Catania
2005–06 season
- President: Antonino Pulvirenti
- Head coach: Pasquale Marino
- Stadium: Stadio Angelo Massimino
- Serie B: 2nd (promoted)
- Coppa Italia: First round

The 2005–06 season was the 77th season in the existence of Calcio Catania and the club's fourth consecutive season in the second division of Italian football. In addition to the domestic league, Catania participated in this season's edition of the Coppa Italia.

== Competitions ==
=== Overall record ===
Competition	First match	Last match	Starting round	Final position	Record							
Competition	First match	Last match	Starting round	Final position	Pld	W	D	L	GF	GA	GD	Win %
Serie B	2 September 2005	May 2006	Matchday 1	2nd	42	22	12	8	67	42	+25	52.38
Coppa Italia	7 August 2005		First round	First round	1	0	1	0	1	1	+0	0.00
Total					43	22	13	8	68	43	+25	51.16

Source: Competitions

=== Serie B ===
==== League table ====
Pos	Team	Pld	W	D	L	GF	GA	GD	Pts	Promotion or relegation
1	Atalanta (P, C)	42	24	9	9	61	39	+22	81	Promotion to Serie A
2	Catania (P)	42	22	12	8	67	42	+25	78	Promotion to Serie A
3	Torino (O, P)	42	21	13	8	51	31	+20	76	Qualification to promotion play-offs
4	Mantova	42	18	15	9	46	35	+11	69	Qualification to promotion play-offs
5	Modena	42	17	16	9	59	41	+18	67	Qualification to promotion play-offs

Source: Almanacco Illustrato del Calcio 2007, Panini Edizioni, Modena, November 2006
Rules for classification: 1) points; 2) head-to-head points; 3) head-to-head goal difference; 4) head-to-head goals scored; 5) goal difference; 6) number of goals scored.
(C) Champions; (O) Play-off winners; (P) Promoted

==== Results summary ====
Overall								Home						Away					
Pld	W	D	L	GF	GA	GD	Pts	W	D	L	GF	GA	GD	W	D	L	GF	GA	GD
42	22	12	8	67	42	+25	78	13	7	1	39	16	+23	9	5	7	28	26	+2

Source: Serie B

==== Results by round ====
Round	1	2	3	4	5	6	7	8	9	10	11	12	13	14	15	16	17
Ground	A	H	A	H	A	H	A	H	H	A	H	A	A	H	A	H	A
Result	D	W	L	D	W	W	L	W	D	L	D	W	D	D	W	W	W
Position																	

Source: Serie B
A = Away; H = Home; W = Win; D = Draw; L = Loss

==== Matches ====
2 September 2005 2	Catania	2–1	Brescia	Catania
--:-- CEST (UTC+2)				Stadium: Stadio Angelo Massimino

10 September 2005 4	Catania	0–0	Arezzo	Catania
--:-- CEST (UTC+2)				Stadium: Stadio Angelo Massimino

14 September 2005 1	Piacenza	1–1	Catania	Piacenza
--:-- CEST (UTC+2)

17 September 2005 5	Bari	0–2	Catania	Bari
--:-- CEST (UTC+2)

20 September 2005 6	Catania	4–1	Atalanta	Catania
--:-- CEST (UTC+2)				Stadium: Stadio Angelo Massimino

24 September 2005 7	Crotone	3–1	Catania	Crotone
--:-- CEST (UTC+2)

1 October 2005 8	Catania	2–0	Avellino	Catania
--:-- CEST (UTC+2)				Stadium: Stadio Angelo Massimino

5 October 2005 3	Cesena	1–0	Catania	Cesena
--:-- CEST (UTC+2)

9 October 2005 9	Catania	2–2	Vicenza	Catania
--:-- CEST (UTC+2)				Stadium: Stadio Angelo Massimino

15 October 2005 10	Mantova	3–0	Catania	Mantua
--:-- CEST (UTC+2)

21 October 2005 11	Catania	1–1	Bologna	Catania
--:-- CEST (UTC+2)

26 October 2005 12	Triestina	1–2	Catania	Trieste
--:-- CEST (UTC+2)

29 October 2005 13	Ternana	0–0	Catania	Terni
--:-- CEST (UTC+2)

4 November 2005 14	Catania	1–1	Torino	Catania
--:-- CET (UTC+1)				Stadium: Stadio Angelo Massimino

13 November 2005 15	Rimini	1–2	Catania	Rimini
--:-- CET (UTC+1)

19 November 2005 16	Catania	2–1	Cremonese	Catania
--:-- CET (UTC+1)				Stadium: Stadio Angelo Massimino

28 November 2005 17	Hellas Verona	1–2	Catania	Verona
--:-- CET (UTC+1)

3 December 2005 18	Catania	3–2	Modena	Catania
--:-- CET (UTC+1)				Stadium: Stadio Angelo Massimino

10 December 2005 19	Pescara	0–1	Catania	Pescara
--:-- CEST (UTC+2)

17 December 2005 20	Catania	3–0	Catanzaro	Catania
--:-- CET (UTC+1)				Stadium: Stadio Angelo Massimino

20 December 2005 21	AlbinoLeffe	2–2	Catania	Bergamo
--:-- CET (UTC+1)

7 January 2006 22	Catania	3–1	Piacenza	Catania
--:-- CEST (UTC+2)				Stadium: Stadio Angelo Massimino

14 January 2006 23	Brescia	2–0	Catania	Brescia
--:-- CET (UTC+1)

17 January 2006 24	Catania	1–0	Cesena	Catania
--:-- CEST (UTC+2)				Stadium: Stadio Angelo Massimino

23 January 2006 25	Arezzo	0–0	Catania	Arezzo
--:-- CET (UTC+1)

28 January 2006 26	Catania	0–1	Bari	Catania
--:-- CEST (UTC+2)				Stadium: Stadio Angelo Massimino

4 February 2006 27	Atalanta	1–2	Catania	Bergamo
--:-- CET (UTC+1)

8 February 2006 28	Catania	3–2	Crotone	Catania
--:-- CET (UTC+1)				Stadium: Stadio Angelo Massimino

13 February 2006 29	Avellino	1–1	Catania	Avellino
--:-- CEST (UTC+2)

25 February 2006 30	Vicenza	0–2	Catania	Vicenza
--:-- CEST (UTC+2)

6 March 2006 31	Catania	3–0	Mantova	Catania
--:-- CET (UTC+1)				Stadium: Stadio Angelo Massimino

11 March 2006 32	Bologna	2–1	Catania	Bologna
--:-- CEST (UTC+2)

18 March 2006 33	Catania	1–1	Triestina	Catania
--:-- CEST (UTC+2)				Stadium: Stadio Angelo Massimino

25 March 2006 34	Catania	3–1	Ternana	Catania
--:-- CEST (UTC+2)				Stadium: Stadio Angelo Massimino

31 March 2006 35	Torino	2–1	Catania	Turin
--:-- CET (UTC+1)

8 April 2006 36	Catania	0–0	Rimini	Catania
--:-- CEST (UTC+2)				Stadium: Stadio Angelo Massimino

23 April 2006 37	Cremonese	2–4	Catania	Cremona
--:-- CET (UTC+1)

28 April 2006 38	Catania	0–0	Hellas Verona	Catania
--:-- CEST (UTC+2)				Stadium: Stadio Angelo Massimino

6 May 2006 39	Modena	2–1	Catania	Modena
--:-- CET (UTC+1)

13 May 2006 40	Catania	3–0	Pescara	Catania
--:-- CEST (UTC+2)				Stadium: Stadio Angelo Massimino

21 May 2006 41	Catanzaro	1–3	Catania	Catanzaro
--:-- CEST (UTC+2)

28 May 2006 42	Catania	2–1	AlbinoLeffe	Catania
--:-- CEST (UTC+2)				Stadium: Stadio Angelo Massimino
