= 2005–06 US Arezzo season =

U.S. Arezzo
2005–06 season
- Chairman: Piero Mancini
- Manager: Elio Gustinetti
- Stadium: Stadio Città di Arezzo
- Serie B: 7th
- Coppa Italia: Second round

The 2005–06 season was the 83rd season in the existence of U.S. Arezzo and the club's second consecutive season in the second division of Italian football. In addition to the domestic league, Arezzo participated in this season's edition of the Coppa Italia.

== Competitions ==
=== Overall record ===
Competition	First match	Last match	Starting round	Final position	Record							
Competition	First match	Last match	Starting round	Final position	Pld	W	D	L	GF	GA	GD	Win %
Serie B	4 September 2005	28 May 2006	Matchday 1	7th	42	17	15	10	45	34	+11	40.48
Coppa Italia	7 August 2005	14 August 2005	First round	Second round	2	1	1	0	5	2	+3	50.00
Total					44	18	16	10	50	36	+14	40.91

Source: Competitions

=== Serie B ===
==== League table ====
Pos	Team	Pld	W	D	L	GF	GA	GD	Pts	Promotion or relegation
5	Modena	42	17	16	9	59	41	+18	67	Qualification to promotion play-offs
6	Cesena	42	18	12	12	66	54	+12	66	Qualification to promotion play-offs
7	Arezzo	42	17	15	10	45	34	+11	66	
8	Bologna	42	16	16	10	55	42	+13	64	
9	Crotone	42	18	9	15	56	48	+8	63	

Source: Almanacco Illustrato del Calcio 2007, Panini Edizioni, Modena, November 2006
Rules for classification: 1) points; 2) head-to-head points; 3) head-to-head goal difference; 4) head-to-head goals scored; 5) goal difference; 6) number of goals scored.

==== Results by round ====
Round	1	2	3	4	5	6	7	8	9	10	11	12	13	14	15	16
Ground	H	A	H	A	H	A	H	A	H	A	H	H	A	H	A	H
Result	W	L	L	D	W	D	D	W	D	D	W	W	D	W	L	D
Position																

Updated to match(es) played on May 2006. Source: Serie B
A = Away; H = Home; W = Win; D = Draw; L = Loss

==== Matches ====
7 September 2005 1	Arezzo	2–0	Crotone	Arezzo
--:-- CEST (UTC+2)

4 September 2005 2	Mantova	1–0	Arezzo	Mantua
--:-- CEST (UTC+2)

5 October 2005 3	Arezzo	1–2	Torino	Arezzo
--:-- CEST (UTC+2)

10 September 2005 4	Catania	0–0	Arezzo	Catania
--:-- CEST (UTC+2)

17 September 2005 5	Arezzo	3–1	Ternana	Arezzo
--:-- CEST (UTC+2)

20 September 2005 6	Brescia	0–0	Arezzo	Brescia
--:-- CEST (UTC+2)

24 September 2005 7	Arezzo	1–1	Cremonese	Arezzo
--:-- CEST (UTC+2)

30 September 2005 8	Vicenza	0–1	Arezzo	Vicenza
--:-- CEST (UTC+2)

9 October 2005 9	Arezzo	2–2	Pescara	Arezzo
--:-- CEST (UTC+2)

15 October 2005 10	Hellas Verona	1–1	Arezzo	Verona
--:-- CEST (UTC+2)

22 October 2005 11	Arezzo	1–0	Catanzaro	Arezzo
--:-- CEST (UTC+2)

25 October 2005 12	Arezzo	3–1	Avellino	Arezzo
--:-- CEST (UTC+2)

29 October 2005 13	Bologna	1–1	Arezzo	Bologna
--:-- CEST (UTC+2)

5 November 2005 14	Arezzo	2–0	AlbinoLeffe	Arezzo
--:-- CEST (UTC+2)

13 November 2005 15	Triestina	1–0	Arezzo	Trieste
--:-- CET (UTC+1)

19 November 2005 16	Arezzo	1–1	Modena	Arezzo
--:-- CEST (UTC+2)

10 December 2005 19	Arezzo	2–0	Atalanta	Arezzo
--:-- CET (UTC+1)

14 January 2006 23	Arezzo	2–0	Mantova	Arezzo
--:-- CET (UTC+1)

13 May 2006 40	Atalanta	2–0	Arezzo	Bergamo
--:-- CEST (UTC+2)

=== Coppa Italia ===
7 August 2005 First round	Lanciano	0–3	Arezzo

14 August 2005 Second round	Arezzo	2–2 (a.e.t.) (4–5 p)	Brescia
