= 2005–06 AC Rimini 1912 season =

A.C. Rimini 1912
2005–06 season
- Chairman: Luca Benedettini
- Manager: Leonardo Acori
- Stadium: Stadio Romeo Neri
- Serie B: 17th
- Coppa Italia: Second round

The 2005–06 season was the 94th season in the existence of A.C. Rimini 1912 and the club's second consecutive season in the second division of Italian football. In addition to the domestic league, Rimini participated in this season's edition of the Coppa Italia.

== Competitions ==
=== Overall record ===
Competition	First match	Last match	Starting round	Final position	Record							
Competition	First match	Last match	Starting round	Final position	Pld	W	D	L	GF	GA	GD	Win %
Serie B	4 September 2005	May 2006	Matchday 1	17th	42	11	15	16	42	49	−7	26.19
Coppa Italia	7 August 2005	14 August 2005	First round	Second round	2	1	0	1	2	2	+0	50.00
Total					44	12	15	17	44	51	−7	27.27

Last updated: May 2006
Source: Competitions

=== Serie B ===
==== League table ====
Pos	Team	Pld	W	D	L	GF	GA	GD	Pts	Promotion or relegation
15	Hellas Verona	42	10	19	13	42	41	+1	49	
16	Vicenza	42	13	10	19	38	49	−11	49	
17	Rimini	42	11	15	16	42	49	−7	48	
18	AlbinoLeffe (O)	42	10	16	16	38	52	−14	46	Qualification to relegation play-offs
19	Avellino (R)	42	11	13	18	42	62	−20	46	Qualification to relegation play-offs

Source: Almanacco Illustrato del Calcio 2007, Panini Edizioni, Modena, November 2006
Rules for classification: 1) points; 2) head-to-head points; 3) head-to-head goal difference; 4) head-to-head goals scored; 5) goal difference; 6) number of goals scored.
(O) Play-off winners; (R) Relegated

==== Results summary ====
Overall								Home						Away					
Pld	W	D	L	GF	GA	GD	Pts	W	D	L	GF	GA	GD	W	D	L	GF	GA	GD
0	0	0	0	0	0	0	0	0	0	0	0	0	0	0	0	0	0	0	0

Last updated: May 2006.
Source: Serie B

==== Results by round ====
Round	1	2	3	4	5	6	7	8	9	10	11	12	13	14	15	16
Ground	A	H	A	H	A	H	A	H	A	H	A	A	H	A	H	A
Result	D	D	W	W	L	D	L	L	D	W	D	L	W	L	L	W
Position																

Updated to match(es) played on May 2006. Source: Serie B
A = Away; H = Home; W = Win; D = Draw; L = Loss

==== Matches ====
Win Draw Loss

14 September 2005 1	AlbinoLeffe	2–2	Rimini	Bergamo
--:-- CEST (UTC+2)

4 September 2005 2	Rimini	1–1	Modena	Rimini
--:-- CEST (UTC+2)

5 October 2005 3	Brescia	0–2	Rimini	Brescia
--:-- CEST (UTC+2)

10 September 2005 4	Rimini	4–2	Catanzaro	Rimini
--:-- CEST (UTC+2)

28 September 2005 5	Cesena	2–1	Rimini	Cesena
--:-- CEST (UTC+2)

21 September 2005 6	Rimini	0–0	Hellas Verona	Rimini
--:-- CEST (UTC+2)

24 September 2005 7	Mantova	3–1	Rimini	Mantua
--:-- CEST (UTC+2)

1 October 2005 8	Rimini	1–2	Triestina	Rimini
--:-- CEST (UTC+2)

10 October 2005 9	Piacenza	0–0	Rimini	Piacenza
--:-- CEST (UTC+2)

15 October 2005 10	Rimini	2–0	Cremonese	Rimini
--:-- CEST (UTC+2)

22 October 2005 11	Avellino	1–1	Rimini	Avellino
--:-- CEST (UTC+2)

26 October 2005 12	Pescara	1–0	Rimini	Pescara
--:-- CEST (UTC+2)

29 October 2005 13	Rimini	2–1	Bari	Rimini
--:-- CEST (UTC+2)

5 November 2005 14	Atalanta	3–0	Rimini	Bergamo
--:-- CET (UTC+1)

13 November 2005 15	Rimini	1–2	Catania	Rimini
--:-- CEST (UTC+2)

21 November 2005 16	Crotone	0–1	Rimini	Crotone
--:-- CET (UTC+1)
