= 2005–06 AS Livorno Calcio season =

Livorno
2005–06 season
- President: Aldo Spinelli
- Manager: Roberto Donadoni (from 6 February); Carlo Mazzone (from 7 February)
- Stadium: Stadio Armando Picchi
- Serie A: 6th
- Coppa Italia: Third round
- Top goalscorer: League: Cristiano Lucarelli (19); All: Cristiano Lucarelli (19)
- Average home league attendance: 13,064

The 2005–06 season was the 91st season in the existence of AS Livorno Calcio and the club's second consecutive season in the top-flight of Italian football. In addition to the domestic league, Livorno participated in this season's edition of the Coppa Italia.

== Pre-season and friendlies ==
Win Draw Loss

== Competitions ==
=== Overall record ===
Competition	First match	Last match	Starting round	Final position	Record							
Competition	First match	Last match	Starting round	Final position	Pld	W	D	L	GF	GA	GD	Win %
Serie A	27 August 2005	14 May 2006	Matchday 1	6th	38	12	13	13	37	44	−7	31.58
Coppa Italia	7 August 2005	21 August 2005	First round	Third round	3	1	1	1	5	3	+2	33.33
Total					41	13	14	14	42	47	−5	31.71

Source: Competitions

=== Serie A ===
==== League table ====
Pos	Team	Pld	W	D	L	GF	GA	GD	Pts	Qualification or relegation
4	Chievo	38	13	15	10	54	49	+5	54	Qualification to Champions League third qualifying round
5	Palermo	38	13	13	12	50	52	−2	52	Qualification to UEFA Cup first round
6	Livorno	38	12	13	13	37	44	−7	49	Qualification to UEFA Cup first round
7	Parma (Note: Parma gained entry to the 2006–07 UEFA Cup because 2005–06 Coppa Italia finalists Inter and Roma qualified to the 2006–07 UEFA Champions League and 2006–07 UEFA Cup through their respective championship positions. The final positions of Parma and Empoli were decided by head-to-head record.)	38	12	9	17	46	60	−14	45	Qualification to UEFA Cup first round
8	Empoli	38	13	6	19	47	61	−14	45	

Source: 2005–06 Serie A, Soccerway
Rules for classification: 1) points; 2) goal difference; 3) number of goals scored.

==== Results summary ====
Overall								Home						Away					
Pld	W	D	L	GF	GA	GD	Pts	W	D	L	GF	GA	GD	W	D	L	GF	GA	GD
38	12	13	13	37	44	−7	49	8	7	4	22	17	+5	4	6	9	15	27	−12

Source: Serie A

==== Results by round ====
Round	1	2	3	4	5	6	7	8	9	10	11	12	13	14	15	16	17	18	19	20	21	22	23	24	25	26	27	28	29	30	31	32	33	34	35	36	37	38
Ground	H	A	H	A	H	A	A	H	A	H	A	H	H	A	H	A	H	A	H	A	H	A	H	A	H	H	A	H	A	H	A	A	H	A	H	A	H	A
Result	W	W	D	D	W	L	L	W	D	W	L	W	D	W	W	W	L	W	D	D	D	L	D	D	W	D	D	L	L	L	L	L	L	L	W	L	D	D
Position	3	2	3	5	3	4	7	4	5	3	5	3	3	3	3	3	3	3	3	3	3	4	4	4	4	4	4	4	4	5	5	6	6	7	6	7	7	7

Source: Serie A
A = Away; H = Home; W = Win; D = Draw; L = Loss

==== Matches ====
27 August 2005 1	Livorno	2–1	Lecce	Livorno
--:-- CEST (UTC+2)				Stadium: Stadio Armando Picchi

11 September 2005 2	Treviso	0–1	Livorno	Treviso
--:-- CEST (UTC+2)

18 September 2005 3	Livorno	0–0	Roma	Livorno
--:-- CEST (UTC+2)				Stadium: Stadio Armando Picchi

21 September 2005 4	Messina	0–0	Livorno	Messina
--:-- CEST (UTC+2)

25 September 2005 5	Livorno	2–0	Ascoli	Livorno
--:-- CEST (UTC+2)				Stadium: Stadio Armando Picchi

2 October 2005 6	Fiorentina	3–2	Livorno	Florence
--:-- CEST (UTC+2)

16 October 2005 7	Internazionale	5–0	Livorno	Milan
--:-- CEST (UTC+2)

23 October 2005 8	Livorno	1–0	Reggina	Livorno
--:-- CEST (UTC+2)				Stadium: Stadio Armando Picchi

26 October 2005 9	Cagliari	1–1	Livorno	Cagliari
--:-- CEST (UTC+2)

30 October 2005 10	Livorno	2–0	Parma	Livorno
--:-- CEST (UTC+2)				Stadium: Stadio Armando Picchi

6 November 2005 11	Juventus	3–0	Livorno	Turin
--:-- CET (UTC+1)

20 November 2005 12	Livorno	2–0	Empoli	Livorno
--:-- CET (UTC+1)				Stadium: Stadio Armando Picchi

26 November 2005 13	Livorno	0–0	Chievo	Livorno
--:-- CET (UTC+1)				Stadium: Stadio Armando Picchi

4 December 2005 14	Udinese	0–2	Livorno	Udine
--:-- CET (UTC+1)

11 December 2005 15	Livorno	2–1	Lazio	Livorno
--:-- CET (UTC+1)				Stadium: Stadio Armando Picchi

18 December 2005 16	Palermo	0–2	Livorno	Palermo
--:-- CET (UTC+1)

21 December 2005 17	Livorno	0–3	Milan	Livorno
--:-- CET (UTC+1)				Stadium: Stadio Armando Picchi

8 January 2006 18	Sampdoria	0–2	Livorno	Genoa
--:-- CET (UTC+1)

15 January 2006 19	Livorno	2–2	Siena	Livorno
--:-- CET (UTC+1)				Stadium: Stadio Armando Picchi

18 January 2006 20	Lecce	0–0	Livorno	Lecce
--:-- CET (UTC+1)

22 January 2006 21	Livorno	1–1	Treviso	Livorno
--:-- CET (UTC+1)				Stadium: Stadio Armando Picchi

29 January 2006 22	Roma	3–0	Livorno	Rome
--:-- CET (UTC+1)

5 February 2006 23	Livorno	2–2	Messina	Livorno
--:-- CET (UTC+1)				Stadium: Stadio Armando Picchi

8 February 2006 24	Ascoli	0–0	Livorno	Ascoli
--:-- CET (UTC+1)

12 February 2006 25	Livorno	2–0	Fiorentina	Livorno
--:-- CET (UTC+1)				Stadium: Stadio Armando Picchi
