= 2005–06 Modena FC season =

Modena
2005–06 season
- Chairman: Romano Amadei
- Manager: Stefano Pioli
- Stadium: Stadio Alberto Braglia
- Serie B: 5th
- Coppa Italia: First round
- Top goalscorer: League: Cristian Bucchi (29); All: Cristian Bucchi (29)

The 2005–06 season was the 94th season in the existence of Modena F.C. and the club's second consecutive season in the second division of Italian football. In addition to the domestic league, Modena participated in this season's edition of the Coppa Italia.

== Competitions ==
=== Overall record ===
Competition	First match	Last match	Starting round	Final position	Record							
Competition	First match	Last match	Starting round	Final position	Pld	W	D	L	GF	GA	GD	Win %
Serie B	4 September 2005	28 May 2006	Matchday 1	5th	42	17	16	9	59	41	+18	40.48
Serie B Promotion play-off	1 June 2006	4 June 2006	Semi-finals	Semi-finals	2	0	2	0	2	2	+0	0.00
Coppa Italia	7 August 2005		First round	First round	1	0	0	1	2	3	−1	0.00
Total					45	17	18	10	63	46	+17	37.78

Source: Competitions

=== Serie B ===
==== League table ====
Pos	Team	Pld	W	D	L	GF	GA	GD	Pts	Promotion or relegation
3	Torino (O, P)	42	21	13	8	51	31	+20	76	Qualification to promotion play-offs
4	Mantova	42	18	15	9	46	35	+11	69	Qualification to promotion play-offs
5	Modena	42	17	16	9	59	41	+18	67	Qualification to promotion play-offs
6	Cesena	42	18	12	12	66	54	+12	66	Qualification to promotion play-offs
7	Arezzo	42	17	15	10	45	34	+11	66	

Source: Almanacco Illustrato del Calcio 2007, Panini Edizioni, Modena, November 2006
Rules for classification: 1) points; 2) head-to-head points; 3) head-to-head goal difference; 4) head-to-head goals scored; 5) goal difference; 6) number of goals scored.
(O) Play-off winners; (P) Promoted

==== Results by round ====
Round	1	2	3	4	5	6	7	8	9	10	11	12	13	14	15	16	17	18	19	20	21	22	23	24	25	26	27	28	29	30	31	32
Ground	H	A	H	A	H	A	H	A	H	A	H	H	A	H	A	A	H	A	H	A	H	A	H	A	H	A	H	A	H	A	H	A
Result	D	D	W	W	W	D	W	D	W	L	D	W	D	D	L	D	D	L	W	D	D	L	D	L	D	L	L	L	W	L	W	D
Position																																

Updated to match(es) played on May 2006. Source: Serie B
A = Away; H = Home; W = Win; D = Draw; L = Loss

==== Matches ====
14 September 2005 1	Modena	0–0	Mantova	Modena
--:-- CEST (UTC+2)

4 September 2005 2	Rimini	1–1	Modena	Rimini
--:-- CEST (UTC+2)

5 October 2005 3	Modena	1–0	Crotone	Modena
--:-- CEST (UTC+2)

10 September 2005 4	Bologna	1–2	Modena	Bologna
--:-- CEST (UTC+2)

17 September 2005 5	Modena	2–0	Avellino	Modena
--:-- CEST (UTC+2)

20 September 2005 6	AlbinoLeffe	0–0	Modena	Bergamo
--:-- CEST (UTC+2)

24 September 2005 7	Modena	2–0	Pescara	Modena
--:-- CEST (UTC+2)

1 October 2005 8	Ternana	1–1	Modena	Terni
--:-- CEST (UTC+2)

9 October 2005 9	Modena	1–0	Catanzaro	Modena
--:-- CEST (UTC+2)

14 October 2005 10	Triestina	2–1	Modena	Trieste
--:-- CEST (UTC+2)

22 October 2005 11	Modena	1–1	Hellas Verona	Modena
--:-- CEST (UTC+2)

26 October 2005 12	Modena	3–0	Cremonese	Modena
--:-- CEST (UTC+2)

31 October 2005 13	Brescia	2–2	Modena	Brescia
--:-- CET (UTC+1)

7 November 2005 14	Modena	0–0	Vicenza	Modena
--:-- CET (UTC+1)

13 November 2005 15	Torino	2–1	Modena	Turin
--:-- CET (UTC+1)

19 November 2005 16	Arezzo	1–1	Modena	Arezzo
--:-- CET (UTC+1)

25 November 2005 17	Modena	2–2	Cesena	Modena
--:-- CET (UTC+1)

3 December 2005 18	Catania	3–2	Modena	Catania
--:-- CET (UTC+1)

12 December 2005 19	Modena	4–1	Bari	Modena
--:-- CET (UTC+1)

17 December 2005 20	Piacenza	0–0	Modena	Piacenza
--:-- CET (UTC+1)

20 December 2005 21	Modena	2–2	Atalanta	Modena
--:-- CET (UTC+1)

9 January 2006 22	Mantova	2–0	Modena	Mantua
--:-- CET (UTC+1)

14 January 2006 23	Modena	2–2	Rimini	Modena
--:-- CET (UTC+1)

17 January 2006 24	Crotone	1–0	Modena	Crotone
--:-- CET (UTC+1)

21 January 2006 25	Modena	0–0	Bologna	Modena
--:-- CET (UTC+1)

28 January 2006 26	Avellino	5–4	Modena	Avellino
--:-- CET (UTC+1)

4 February 2006 27	Modena	1–2	AlbinoLeffe	Modena
--:-- CET (UTC+1)

7 February 2006 28	Pescara	1–0	Modena	Pescara
--:-- CET (UTC+1)

11 February 2006 29	Modena	2–0	Ternana	Modena
--:-- CET (UTC+1)

25 February 2006 30	Catanzaro	1–0	Modena	Catanzaro
--:-- CET (UTC+1)

4 March 2006 31	Modena	2–0	Triestina	Modena
--:-- CET (UTC+1)

11 March 2006 32	Hellas Verona	1–1	Modena	Verona
--:-- CET (UTC+1)

6 May 2006 39	Modena	2–1	Catania	Modena

13 May 2006 40	Bari	2–2	Mantova	Bari

21 May 2006 41	Modena	1–0	Piacenza	Modena

28 May 2006 42	Atalanta	0–1	Modena	Bergamo

==== Promotion play-off ====
1 June 2006 First leg	Modena	0–0	Mantova	Modena

4 June 2006 Second leg	Mantova	1–1 (1–1 agg.)	Modena	Mantua
	Gasparetto 5'		Bucchi 88'

Mantova has a higher point total and thus advances to the finals.

=== Coppa Italia ===
7 August 2005 First round	Cittadella	3–2	Mantova
