= 2005–06 Pescara Calcio season =

Pescara Calcio
2005–06 season
- Chairman: Giorgio Lugaresi
- Head coach: Fabrizio Castori
- Stadium: Stadio Adriatico
- Serie B: 11th
- Coppa Italia: First round

The 2005–06 season was the 66th season in the existence of Pescara Calcio and the club's second consecutive season in the second division of Italian football. In addition to the domestic league, Pescara participated in this season's edition of the Coppa Italia.

== Competitions ==
=== Overall record ===
Competition	First match	Last match	Starting round	Final position	Record							
Competition	First match	Last match	Starting round	Final position	Pld	W	D	L	GF	GA	GD	Win %
Serie B	5 September 2005	May 2006	Matchday 1		42	14	12	16	41	50	−9	33.33
Coppa Italia	7 August 2005		First round	First round	1	0	0	1	0	2	−2	0.00
Total					43	14	12	17	41	52	−11	32.56

Last updated: May 2006
Source: Competitions

=== Serie B ===
==== League table ====
Pos	Team	Pld	W	D	L	GF	GA	GD	Pts
9	Crotone	42	18	9	15	56	48	+8	63
10	Brescia	42	15	15	12	54	44	+10	60
11	Pescara	42	14	12	16	41	50	−9	54
12	Piacenza	42	13	15	14	56	52	+4	54
13	Bari	42	11	18	13	43	47	−4	51

Source: Almanacco Illustrato del Calcio 2007, Panini Edizioni, Modena, November 2006
Rules for classification: 1) points; 2) head-to-head points; 3) head-to-head goal difference; 4) head-to-head goals scored; 5) goal difference; 6) number of goals scored.

==== Results by round ====
Round	1	2	3	4	5	6	7	8	9	10	11	12	13	14	15	16
Ground	H	A	H	A	H	A	A	H	A	H	A	H	A	H	A	A
Result	L	L	W	D	W	L	L	W	D	L	L	W	D	W	W	D
Position																

Updated to match(es) played on May 2006. Source: Serie B
A = Away; H = Home; W = Win; D = Draw; L = Loss

==== Matches ====
5 September 2005 2	Bologna	2–1	Pescara	Bologna
--:-- CEST (UTC+2)

27 September 2005 1	Pescara	0–2	Torino	Pescara
--:-- CEST (UTC+2)

5 October 2005 3	Pescara	3–1	Vicenza	Pescara
--:-- CEST (UTC+2)

12 September 2005 4	Ternana	2–2	Pescara	Terni
--:-- CEST (UTC+2)

17 September 2005 5	Pescara	3–1	Cremonese	Pescara
--:-- CEST (UTC+2)

20 September 2005 6	Catanzaro	1–0	Pescara	Catanzaro
--:-- CEST (UTC+2)

24 September 2005 7	Modena	2–0	Pescara	Modena
--:-- CEST (UTC+2)

1 October 2005 8	Pescara	1–0	Hellas Verona	Pescara
--:-- CEST (UTC+2)

9 October 2005 9	Arezzo	2–2	Pescara	Arezzo
--:-- CEST (UTC+2)

15 October 2005 10	Pescara	0–3	Brescia	Pescara
--:-- CEST (UTC+2)

22 October 2005 11	AlbinoLeffe	2–0	Pescara	Bergamo
--:-- CEST (UTC+2)

26 October 2005 12	Pescara	1–0	Rimini	Pescara
--:-- CEST (UTC+2)

29 October 2005 13	Crotone	0–0	Pescara	Crotone
--:-- CEST (UTC+2)

5 November 2005 14	Pescara	5–1	Triestina	Pescara
--:-- CET (UTC+1)

13 November 2005 15	Avellino	1–3	Pescara	Avellino
--:-- CET (UTC+1)

19 November 2005 16	Piacenza	0–0	Pescara	Piacenza
--:-- CET (UTC+1)
