= 2005–06 US Avellino season =

U.S. Avellino 1912
2005–06 season
- Chairman: Massimo Pugliese
- Manager: Francesco Oddo; Franco Colomba
- Stadium: Stadio Partenio-Adriano Lombardi
- Serie B: 19th
- Coppa Italia: Second round

The 2005–06 season was the 94th season in the existence of U.S. Avellino 1912 and the club's first season back in the second division of Italian football. In addition to the domestic league, Avellino participated in this season's edition of the Coppa Italia.

== Competitions ==
=== Overall record ===
Competition	First match	Last match	Starting round	Final position	Record							
Competition	First match	Last match	Starting round	Final position	Pld	W	D	L	GF	GA	GD	Win %
Serie B	26 August 2005	May 2006	Matchday 1	19th	42	11	13	18	42	62	−20	26.19
Coppa Italia	7 August 2005	14 August 2005	First round	Second round	2	1	0	1	3	1	+2	50.00
Total					44	12	13	19	45	63	−18	27.27

Last updated: May 2006
Source: Competitions

=== Serie B ===
==== League table ====
Pos	Team	Pld	W	D	L	GF	GA	GD	Pts	Promotion or relegation
17	Rimini	42	11	15	16	42	49	−7	48	
18	AlbinoLeffe (O)	42	10	16	16	38	52	−14	46	Qualification to relegation play-offs
19	Avellino (R)	42	11	13	18	42	62	−20	46	Qualification to relegation play-offs
20	Ternana (R)	42	7	18	17	36	58	−22	39	Relegation to Serie C1
21	Cremonese (R)	42	6	12	24	36	60	−24	30	Relegation to Serie C1

Source: Almanacco Illustrato del Calcio 2007, Panini Edizioni, Modena, November 2006
Rules for classification: 1) points; 2) head-to-head points; 3) head-to-head goal difference; 4) head-to-head goals scored; 5) goal difference; 6) number of goals scored.
(O) Play-off winners; (R) Relegated

==== Matches ====
26 August 2005 1	Hellas Verona	0–0	Avellino	Verona
--:-- CEST (UTC+2)

4 September 2005 2	Avellino	0–1	Triestina	Avellino
--:-- CEST (UTC+2)

5 October 2005 3	Catanzaro	1–2	Avellino	Catanzaro
--:-- CEST (UTC+2)

9 September 2005 4	Avellino	2–5	Brescia	Avellino
--:-- CEST (UTC+2)

17 September 2005 5	Modena	2–0	Avellino	Modena
--:-- CEST (UTC+2)

20 September 2005 6	Avellino	1–1	Bari	Avellino
--:-- CEST (UTC+2)

24 September 2005 7	Cesena	3–2	Avellino	Cesena
--:-- CEST (UTC+2)

1 October 2005 8	Catania	2–0	Avellino	Catania
--:-- CEST (UTC+2)

9 October 2005 9	Avellino	2–1	Cremonese	Avellino
--:-- CEST (UTC+2)

15 October 2005 10	AlbinoLeffe	2–0	Avellino	Bergamo
--:-- CEST (UTC+2)

22 October 2005 11	Avellino	1–1	Rimini	Avellino
--:-- CEST (UTC+2)

25 October 2005 12	Arezzo	3–1	Avellino	Arezzo
--:-- CEST (UTC+2)

29 October 2005 13	Avellino	0–0	Mantova	Avellino
--:-- CEST (UTC+2)

5 November 2005 14	Piacenza	2–0	Avellino	Piacenza
--:-- CET (UTC+1)

13 November 2005 15	Avellino	1–3	Pescara	Avellino
--:-- CET (UTC+1)

19 November 2005 16	Atalanta	2–0	Avellino	Bergamo
--:-- CET (UTC+1)

25 March 2006 34	Mantova	3–0	Avellino	Mantua
--:-- CET (UTC+1)				Stadium: Stadio Danilo Martelli

22 April 2006 37	Avellino	0–0	Atalanta	Avellino
--:-- CEST (UTC+2)

=== Coppa Italia ===
7 August 2005 First round	Frosinone	0–3; Awarded	Avellino

14 August 2005 Second round	Avellino	0–1	Siena
