= Michele Fanoli =

Italian painter and engraver (1808–1876)

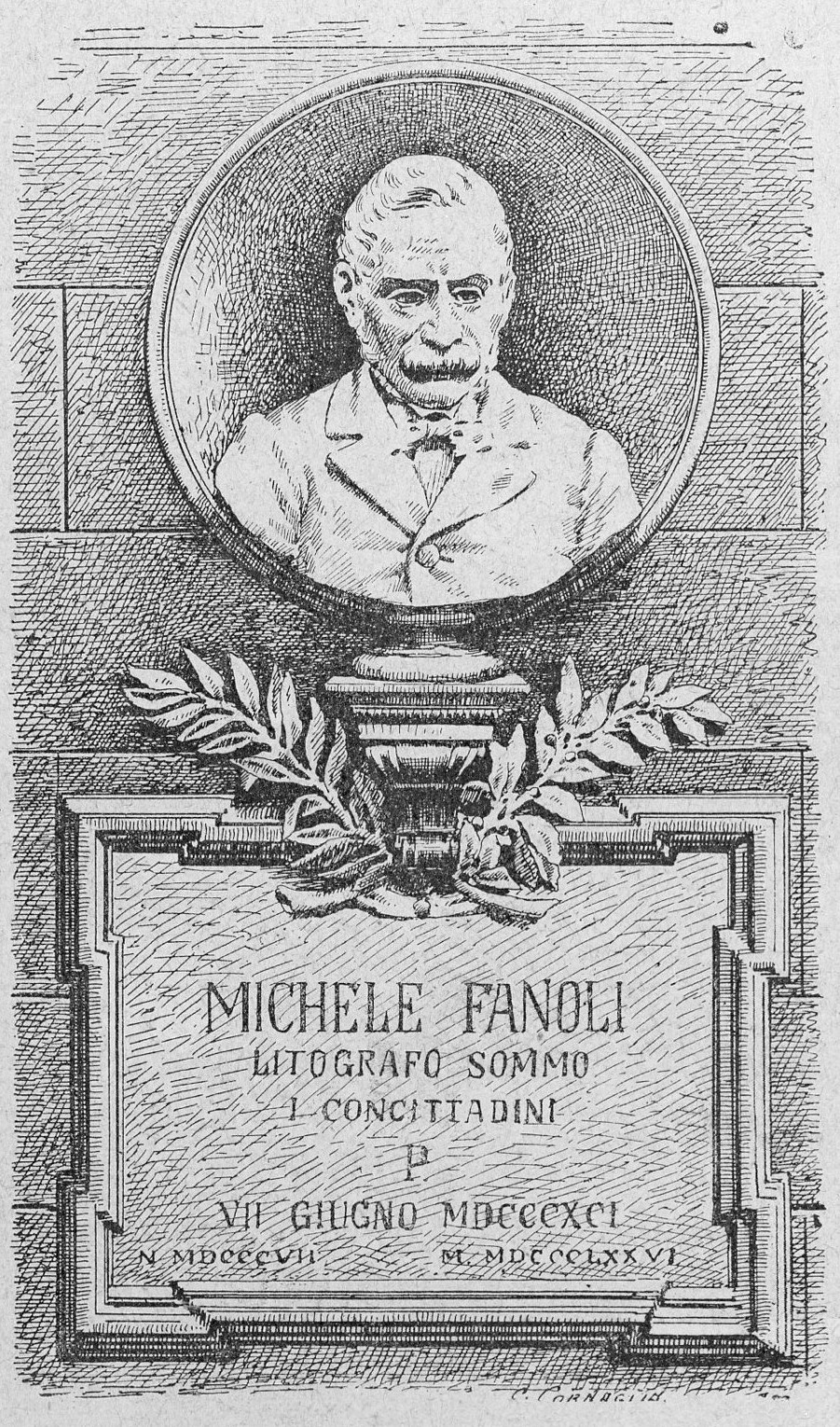
Monument to Fanoli (1891) by Gerolamo Bortotti

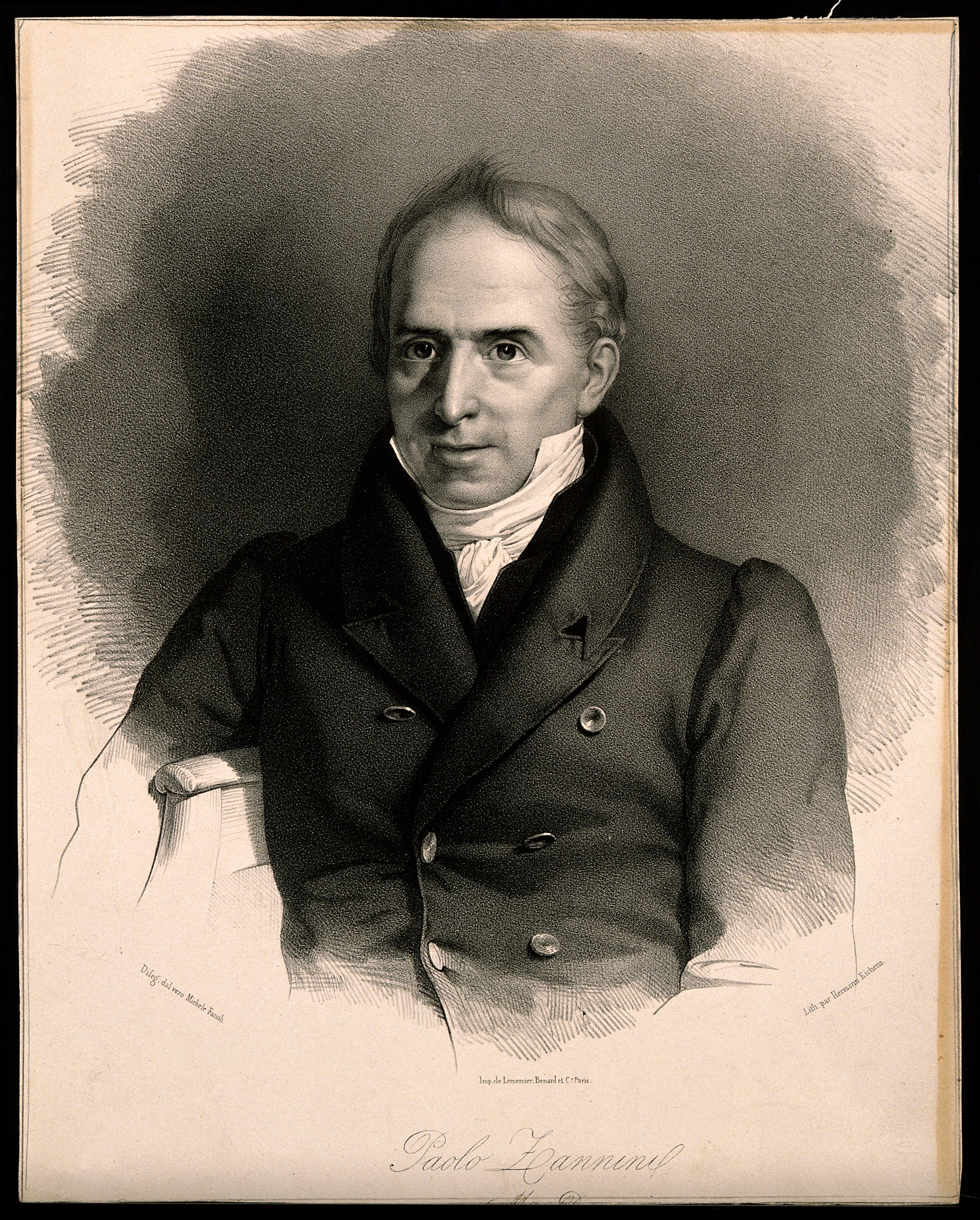
Lithograph of Paolo Zannini by Fanoli.

Michele or Michel Fanoli (1807 – 19 September 1876) was an Italian painter and engraver, mainly of religious subjects and portraits in a Neoclassical style.

== Biography ==
He was born in Cittadella, province of Padua. He studied under Leopoldo Cicognara at the Academy of Fine Arts at Modena, and at the Accademia di Belle Arti of Venice at the urging of Cicognara. He traveled to Paris where he learned the art of lithography.

In Paris he made lithographic reproductions of major works including Deposition (1848), Les Willis (1848), Marriage at Cana (1849), Orpheus (1854), Last Supper (1855), and Immaculate Conception (1855), printed by Lemercier in Paris. When he returned to Italy in 1860, he was made director of the School of Lithography at the Brera Academy.

Fanoli made a widely circulated painting from a scene in the opera I Promessi Sposi. He also engraved a fanciful inventory of the sculptural works of Antonio Canova (1840). He was a lifelong friend of Luigi Carrer. He painted two works in Cittadella: La riconoscenza displayed in City Hall, and an altarpiece (Blessed Veronica Giuliani receives Stigmata surrounded by Saints) for the principal church of the town.
