= 2005–06 AS Bari season =

A.S. Bari
2005–06 season
- President: Vincenzo Matarrese
- Head coach: Guido Carboni
- Stadium: Stadio San Nicola
- Serie B: 13th
- Coppa Italia: Round of 16

The 2005–06 season was the 66th season in the existence of A.S. Bari and the club's second consecutive season in the second division of Italian football. In addition to the domestic league, Bari participated in this season's edition of the Coppa Italia.

== Competitions ==
=== Overall record ===
Competition	First match	Last match	Starting round	Final position	Record							
Competition	First match	Last match	Starting round	Final position	Pld	W	D	L	GF	GA	GD	Win %
Serie B	27 August 2005	28 May 2006	Matchday 1	13th	42	11	18	13	43	47	−4	26.19
Coppa Italia	7 August 2005	10 January 2006	First round	Round of 16	5	2	2	1	8	7	+1	40.00
Total					47	13	20	14	51	54	−3	27.66

Source: Competitions

=== Serie B ===
==== League table ====
Pos	Team	Pld	W	D	L	GF	GA	GD	Pts
11	Pescara	42	14	12	16	41	50	−9	54
12	Piacenza	42	13	15	14	56	52	+4	54
13	Bari	42	11	18	13	43	47	−4	51
14	Triestina	42	12	15	15	44	51	−7	51
15	Hellas Verona	42	10	19	13	42	41	+1	49

Source: Almanacco Illustrato del Calcio 2007, Panini Edizioni, Modena, November 2006
Rules for classification: 1) points; 2) head-to-head points; 3) head-to-head goal difference; 4) head-to-head goals scored; 5) goal difference; 6) number of goals scored.

==== Results by round ====
Round	1	2	3	4	5	6	7	8	9	10	11	12	13	14	15	16
Ground	H	A	H	A	H	A	H	H	A	H	A	H	A	H	A	H
Result	W	D	D	L	L	D	L	D	L	W	D	W	L	W	D	W
Position																

Updated to match(es) played on May 2006. Source: Serie B
A = Away; H = Home; W = Win; D = Draw; L = Loss

==== Matches ====
27 August 2005 1	Bari	2–0	Ternana	Bari
--:-- CEST (UTC+2)

18 October 2005 2	Torino	0–0	Bari	Turin
--:-- CEST (UTC+2)

5 October 2005 3	Bari	1–1	Mantova	Bari
--:-- CEST (UTC+2)

10 September 2005 4	Crotone	2–1	Bari	Crotone
--:-- CEST (UTC+2)

17 September 2005 5	Bari	0–2	Catania	Bari
--:-- CEST (UTC+2)

20 September 2005 6	Avellino	1–1	Bari	Avellino
--:-- CEST (UTC+2)

26 September 2005 7	Bari	0–1	Bologna	Bari
--:-- CEST (UTC+2)

1 October 2005 8	Bari	1–1	Piacenza	Bari
--:-- CEST (UTC+2)

10 October 2005 9	Cesena	2–1	Bari	Cesena
--:-- CEST (UTC+2)

15 October 2005 10	Bari	2–1	Atalanta	Bari
--:-- CEST (UTC+2)

22 October 2005 11	Brescia	2–2	Bari	Brescia
--:-- CEST (UTC+2)

26 October 2005 12	Bari	2–1	Vicenza	Bari
--:-- CEST (UTC+2)

29 October 2005 13	Rimini	2–1	Bari	Rimini
--:-- CEST (UTC+2)

5 November 2005 14	Bari	1–0	Cremonese	Bari
--:-- CET (UTC+1)

13 November 2005 15	Catanzaro	0–0	Bari	Catanzaro
--:-- CET (UTC+1)

18 November 2005 16	Bari	3–1	AlbinoLeffe	Bari
--:-- CET (UTC+1)

17 January 2006 24	Mantova	1–0	Bari	Mantua
--:-- CET (UTC+1)				Stadium: Stadio Danilo Martelli

4 March 2006 31	Atalanta	1–0	Bari	Bergamo
--:-- CET (UTC+1)

=== Coppa Italia ===
7 August 2005 First round	Martina	1–2	Bari

14 August 2005 Second round	Bari	2–1	Ascoli

21 August 2005 Third round	Pavia	0–0 (a.e.t.) (5–6 p)	Bari

7 December 2005 Round of 16; First leg	Bari	0–0	Palermo

10 January 2006 Round of 16; Second leg	Palermo	5–4 (5–4 agg.)	Bari
