= 2005–06 AC Cesena season =

A.C. Cesena
2005–06 season
- Chairman: Giorgio Lugaresi
- Head coach: Fabrizio Castori
- Stadium: Stadio Dino Manuzzi
- Serie B: 6th
- Coppa Italia: Third round

The 2005–06 season was the 66th season in the existence of A.C. Cesena and the club's second consecutive season in the second division of Italian football. In addition to the domestic league, Cesena participated in this season's edition of the Coppa Italia.

== Competitions ==
=== Overall record ===
Competition	First match	Last match	Starting round	Final position	Record							
Competition	First match	Last match	Starting round	Final position	Pld	W	D	L	GF	GA	GD	Win %
Serie B	4 September 2005	28 May 2006	Matchday 1	6th	42	18	12	12	66	54	+12	42.86
Coppa Italia	7 August 2005	20 August 2005	First round	Third round	3	2	0	1	2	1	+1	66.67
Total					45	20	12	13	68	55	+13	44.44

Source: Competitions

=== Serie B ===
==== League table ====
Pos	Team	Pld	W	D	L	GF	GA	GD	Pts	Promotion or relegation
4	Mantova	42	18	15	9	46	35	+11	69	Qualification to promotion play-offs
5	Modena	42	17	16	9	59	41	+18	67	Qualification to promotion play-offs
6	Cesena	42	18	12	12	66	54	+12	66	Qualification to promotion play-offs
7	Arezzo	42	17	15	10	45	34	+11	66	
8	Bologna	42	16	16	10	55	42	+13	64	

Source: Almanacco Illustrato del Calcio 2007, Panini Edizioni, Modena, November 2006
Rules for classification: 1) points; 2) head-to-head points; 3) head-to-head goal difference; 4) head-to-head goals scored; 5) goal difference; 6) number of goals scored.

==== Results by round ====
Round	1	2	3	4	5	6	7	8	9	10	11	12	13	14	15	16
Ground	H	A	H	A	H	A	H	A	H	A	H	H	A	H	A	H
Result	L	L	W	L	W	W	W	W	W	D	D	D	L	W	W	L
Position																

Updated to match(es) played on May 2006. Source: Serie B
A = Away; H = Home; W = Win; D = Draw; L = Loss

==== Matches ====
7 September 2005 1	Cesena	0–2	Atalanta	Cesena
--:-- CEST (UTC+2)

4 September 2005 2	Vicenza	1–0	Cesena	Vicenza
--:-- CEST (UTC+2)

5 October 2005 3	Cesena	1–0	Catania	Cesena
--:-- CEST (UTC+2)

10 September 2005 4	Mantova	3–2	Cesena	Mantua
--:-- CEST (UTC+2)

28 September 2005 5	Cesena	2–1	Rimini	Cesena
--:-- CEST (UTC+2)

20 September 2005 6	Ternana	0–3	Cesena	Terni
--:-- CEST (UTC+2)

24 September 2005 7	Cesena	3–2	Avellino	Cesena
--:-- CEST (UTC+2)

1 October 2005 8	Cremonese	2–3	Cesena	Cremona
--:-- CEST (UTC+2)

10 October 2005 9	Cesena	2–1	Bari	Cesena
--:-- CEST (UTC+2)

15 October 2005 10	Piacenza	2–2	Cesena	Piacenza
--:-- CEST (UTC+2)

21 October 2005 11	Cesena	0–0	Triestina	Cesena
--:-- CEST (UTC+2)

26 October 2005 12	Cesena	0–0	Crotone	Cesena
--:-- CEST (UTC+2)

29 October 2005 13	Torino	1–0	Cesena	Turin
--:-- CEST (UTC+2)

5 November 2005 14	Cesena	2–0	Bologna	Cesena
--:-- CET (UTC+1)

13 November 2005 15	AlbinoLeffe	0–3	Cesena	Bergamo
--:-- CET (UTC+1)

19 November 2005 16	Cesena	1–2	Brescia	Cesena
--:-- CET (UTC+1)

7 January 2006 22	Atalanta	2–2	Cesena	Bergamo
--:-- CET (UTC+1)

23 January 2006 25	Cesena	2–0	Mantova	Cesena
--:-- CET (UTC+1)

24 March 2006 34	Cesena	1–2	Torino	Cesena
--:-- CET (UTC+1)

2 April 2006 35	Bologna	0–0	Cesena	Bologna
--:-- CEST (UTC+2)

8 April 2006 36	Cesena	2–2	AlbinoLeffe	Cesena
--:-- CEST (UTC+2)

23 April 2006 37	Brescia	3–2	Cesena	Brescia
--:-- CEST (UTC+2)

29 April 2006 38	Cesena	2–4	Modena	Cesena
--:-- CEST (UTC+2)

6 May 2006 39	Pescara	3–2	Cesena	Pescara
--:-- CEST (UTC+2)

13 May 2006 40	Cesena	4–1	Catanzaro	Cesena
--:-- CEST (UTC+2)

21 May 2006 41	Arezzo	1–0	Cesena	Arezzo
--:-- CEST (UTC+2)

28 May 2006 42	Cesena	2–1	Hellas Verona	Cesena
--:-- CEST (UTC+2)

=== Coppa Italia ===
7 August 2005 First round	Spezia	0–1 (a.e.t.)	Cesena

13 August 2005 Second round	Cesena	1–0	Bologna

20 August 2005 Third round	Cesena	0–1	Fiorentina
