= 2005–06 US Triestina Calcio 1918 season =

U.S. Triestina Calcio 1918
2005–06 season
- Head coach: Vittorio Russo
- Stadium: Stadio Nereo Rocco
- Serie B: 14th
- Coppa Italia: First round

The 2005–06 season was the 66th season in the existence of U.S. Triestina Calcio 1918 and the club's second consecutive season in the second division of Italian football. In addition to the domestic league, Triestina participated in this season's edition of the Coppa Italia.

== Competitions ==
=== Overall record ===
Competition	First match	Last match	Starting round	Record							
Competition	First match	Last match	Starting round	Pld	W	D	L	GF	GA	GD	Win %
Serie B	August 2005	May 2006	Matchday 1	0	0	0	0	0	0	+0	—
Coppa Italia	TBD			0	0	0	0	0	0	+0	—
Total				0	0	0	0	0	0	+0	—

Last updated: May 2006
Source: Competitions

=== Serie B ===
==== League table ====
Pos	Team	Pld	W	D	L	GF	GA	GD	Pts
12	Piacenza	42	13	15	14	56	52	+4	54
13	Bari	42	11	18	13	43	47	−4	51
14	Triestina	42	12	15	15	44	51	−7	51
15	Hellas Verona	42	10	19	13	42	41	+1	49
16	Vicenza	42	13	10	19	38	49	−11	49

Source: Almanacco Illustrato del Calcio 2007, Panini Edizioni, Modena, November 2006
Rules for classification: 1) points; 2) head-to-head points; 3) head-to-head goal difference; 4) head-to-head goals scored; 5) goal difference; 6) number of goals scored.

==== Results by round ====
Round	1	2	3	4	5	6	7	8	9	10	11	12	13	14	15	16
Ground	H	A	H	A	H	A	H	A	A	H	A	H	H	A	H	A
Result	D	W	W	L	D	D	W	W	L	W	D	L	L	L	W	L
Position																

Updated to match(es) played on May 2006. Source: Serie B
A = Away; H = Home; W = Win; D = Draw; L = Loss

==== Matches ====
29 August 2005 1	Triestina	0–0	Bologna	Trieste
--:-- CEST (UTC+2)

4 September 2005 2	Avellino	0–1	Triestina	Avellino
--:-- CEST (UTC+2)

5 October 2005 3	Triestina	2–0	Ternana	Trieste
--:-- CEST (UTC+2)

10 September 2005 4	Atalanta	1–0	Triestina	Bergamo
--:-- CEST (UTC+2)

17 September 2005 5	Triestina	1–1	AlbinoLeffe	Trieste
--:-- CEST (UTC+2)

21 September 2005 6	Cremonese	0–0	Triestina	Cremona
--:-- CEST (UTC+2)

24 September 2005 7	Triestina	2–0	Catanzaro	Trieste
--:-- CEST (UTC+2)

1 October 2005 8	Rimini	1–2	Triestina	Rimini
--:-- CEST (UTC+2)

9 October 2005 9	Brescia	1–0	Triestina	Brescia
--:-- CEST (UTC+2)

14 October 2005 10	Triestina	2–1	Modena	Trieste
--:-- CEST (UTC+2)

21 October 2005 11	Cesena	0–0	Triestina	Cesena
--:-- CEST (UTC+2)

26 October 2005 12	Triestina	1–2	Catania	Trieste
--:-- CEST (UTC+2)

29 October 2005 13	Triestina	0–3	Hellas Verona	Trieste
--:-- CEST (UTC+2)

5 November 2005 14	Pescara	5–1	Triestina	Pescara
--:-- CET (UTC+1)

13 November 2005 15	Triestina	1–0	Arezzo	Trieste
--:-- CET (UTC+1)

19 November 2005 16	Vicenza	2–1	Triestina	Vicenza
--:-- CET (UTC+1)
