= Arnaldo Rosin =

Italian artist

Arnaldo Rosin (born 1932) is an Italian artist, illustrator and composer living in Milan.

Rosin's style is often described as 'transcendent art', combining elements of surrealism and postmodernism with frequent visual references to Italian Renaissance art.

Rosin was born in the town of Cittadella near Padua but his family moved to Umbria when he was very young. In his youth he drew comic strips for money, but in 1967, began to devote his time completely to painting and illustration.

He has been featured at art exhibitions in Milan and other cities since the 1970s. In addition to paintings, he has also illustrated books of folklore.
