= Cittadella Duomo =

Church in Italy

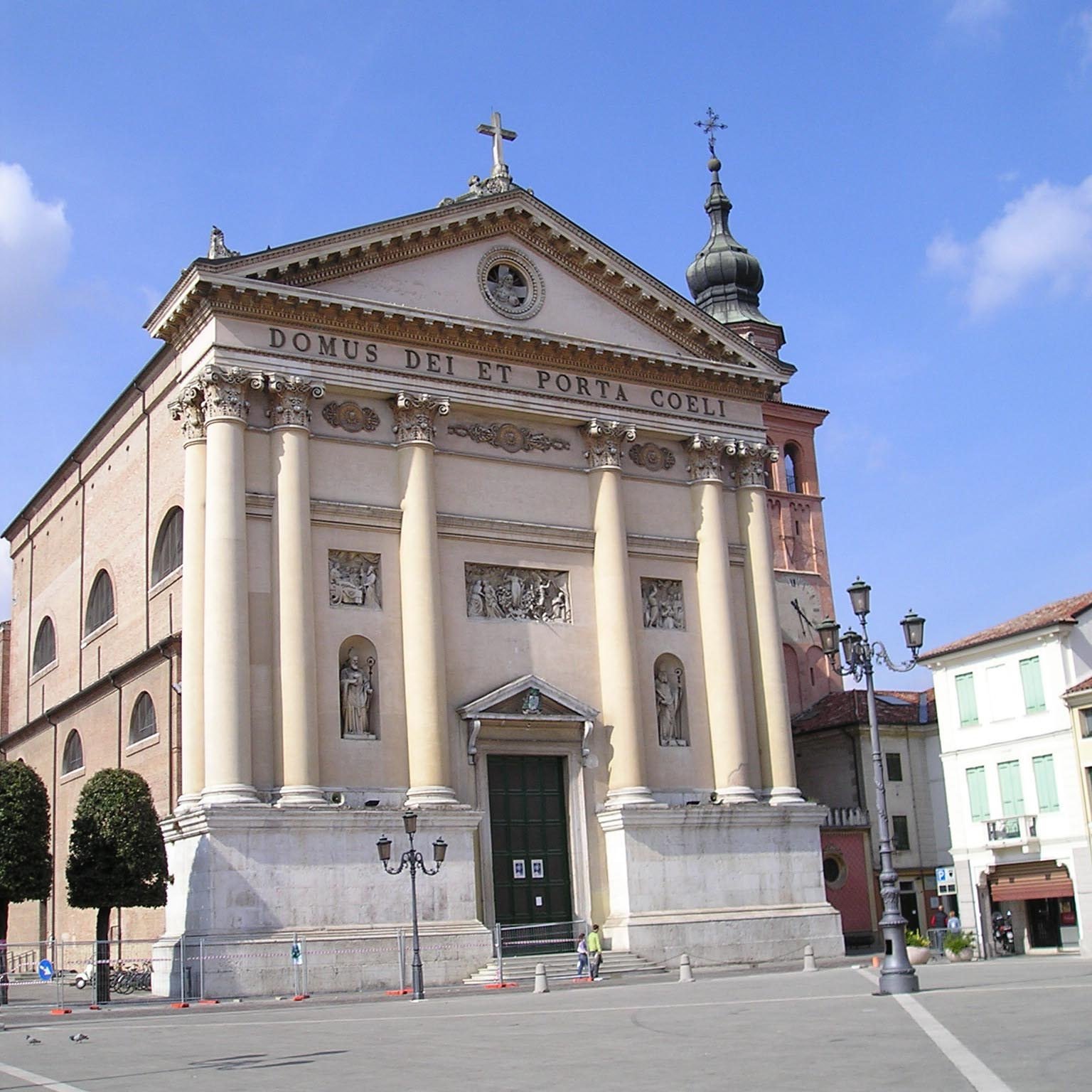
Cittadella Duomo

The Cittadella Duomo is the main Roman Catholic church in the town of Cittadella, province of Padua, region of Veneto, Italy.

== History ==
The present church was constructed between 1774 and 1826, with two main contributing architects: Domenico Cerato and Ottavio Bertotti Scamozzi who created the Neoclassical façade. Carlo Barera completed the work in 1913.

The nave altarpieces include works by Leandro Bassano, Lattanzio Querena, Sebastiano Santi, and Michele Fanoli. In the Sacristy, is a Supper at Emmaus by Jacopo da Ponte, once found in the town's parish church. The sacristy also contains a Deposition attributed to Lazzaro Bastiani, a Flagellation attributed to Palma il Giovane, a Lament on the Dead Christ by Andrea da Murano, 17th-century Adoration of the Magi and Crucifixion. There is a Museum of Religious Art in the bell-tower.

The bell-tower houses a museum of precious sacred objects.
