= Gerolamo Bortotti =

Italian sculptor

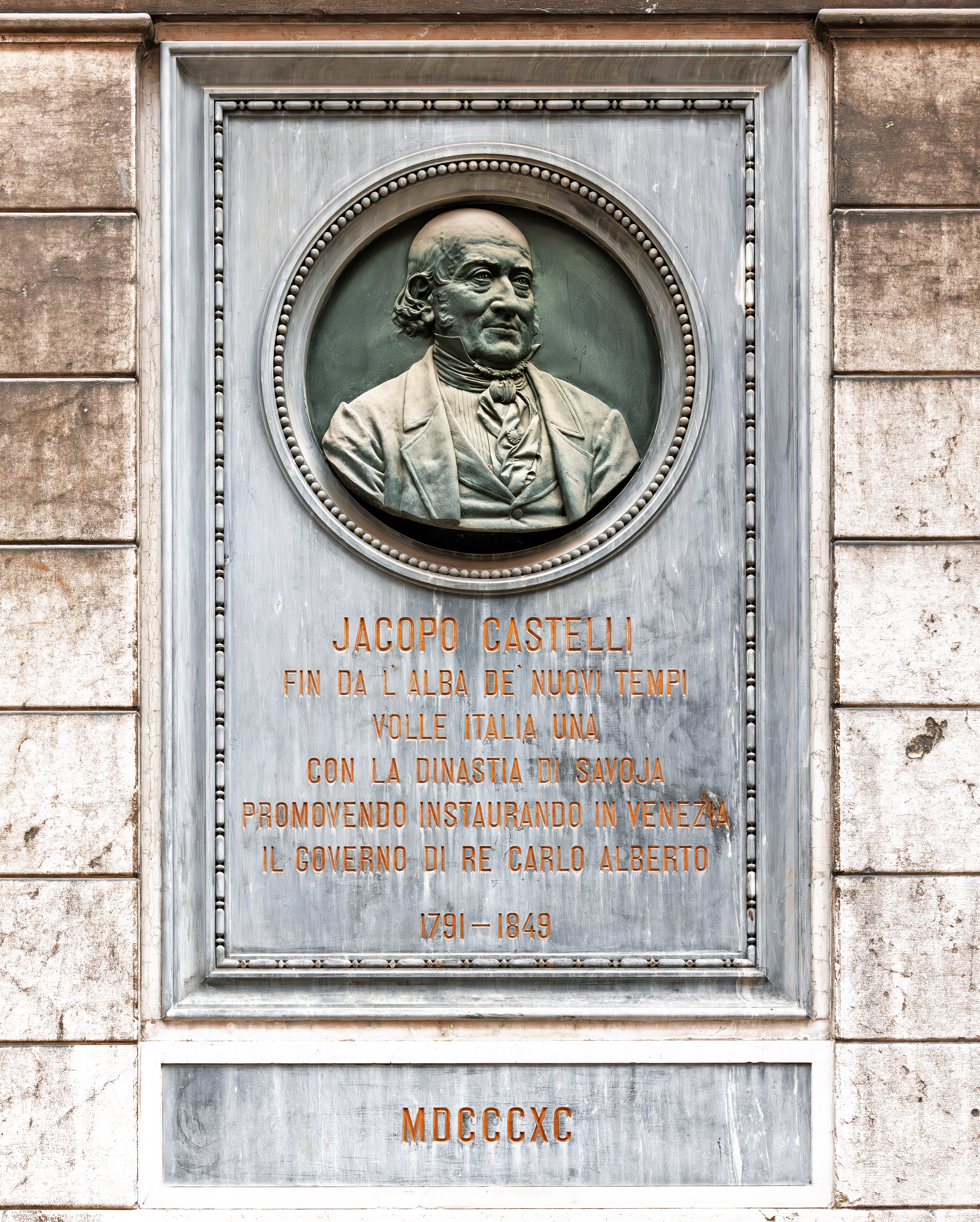
Monument to Jacopo Castelli, Museo Correr

Gerolamo Bortotti (c. 1857 – 1925 in Venice) was an Italian sculptor.

== Biography ==
He was born in Belluno, and with a three-year stipend from his native city, he was able to attend the Accademia di Belle Arti of Venice. He was noted as a wood carver, a skill he had learned in his native city, which had also produced the carver and sculptor, Andrea Brustolon, and the contemporary rival of Bortotti, Valentino Panciera Besarel.

Bortotti was sought after for his carved frames, caskets, and other woodwork. Some of his frames were themselves displayed and awarded at expositions. For many years, Bortotti was mainly dedicated to sculpture, and the 1881 exhibition of Fine Arts in Milan he displayed: The Rape (ratto) of the Venetian Brides. He also made ceramic sculpture including: Modesty and A Fisherman of Chioggia.

He worked mainly in Venice. Among his portrait work are a bust of Giuseppe Verdi at the Giardini, the portrait of Jacopo Castelli for display at Bocca di Piazza, and the bust of Pope Pius X (1907) placed on the landing of the grand staircase at the Scuola di San Rocco.
