= Cittadella =

Cittadella Sitadeła
- Comune
- Comune di Cittadella
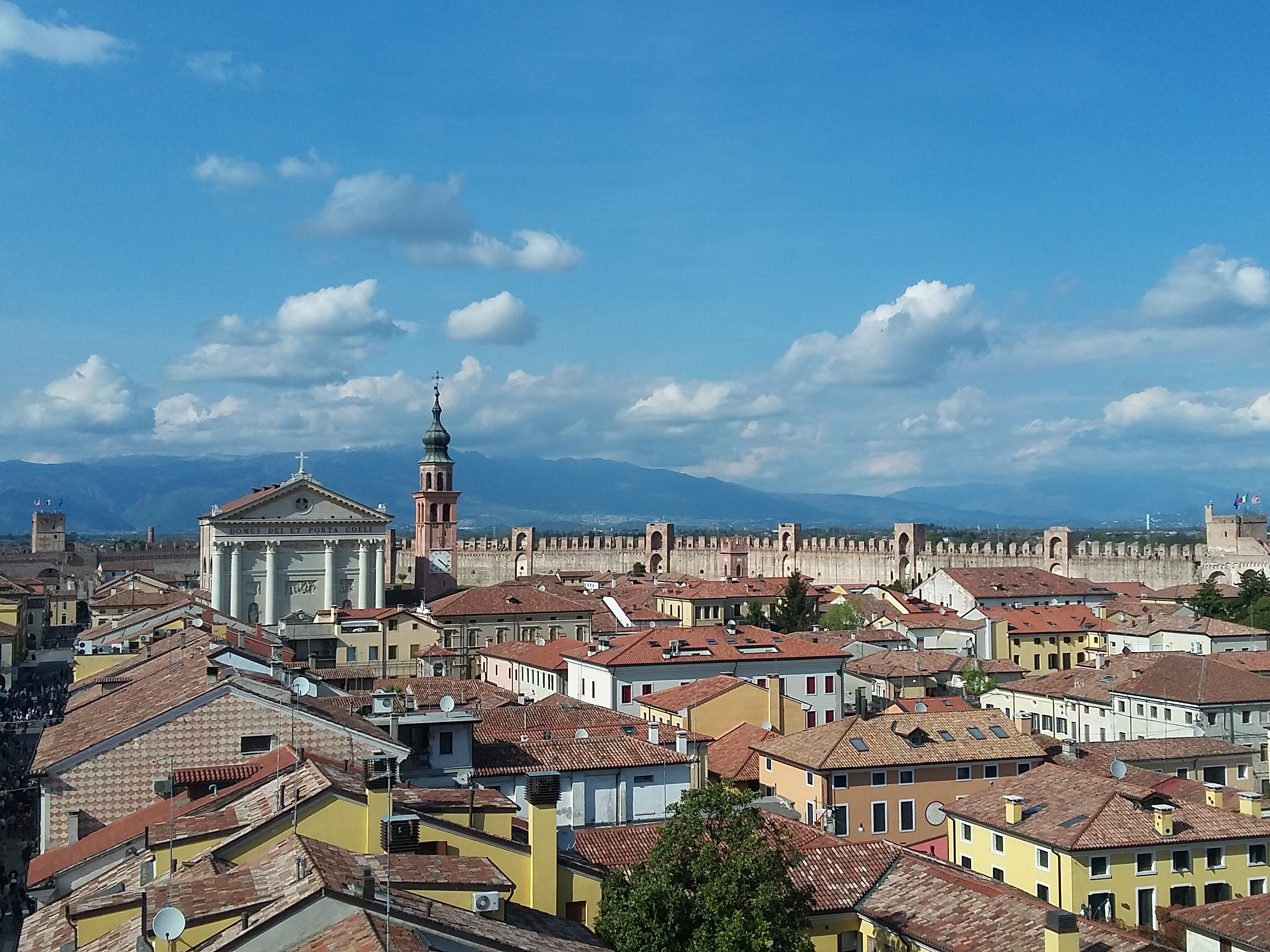
- A view of a section of the Vicenza gate of Cittadella's walls from the outside

- Coat of arms

- Location within Italy Location within Veneto
- Coordinates: 45°39′N 11°47′E
- Country: Italy
- Region: Veneto
- Province: Padua (PD)
- Frazioni: Ca' Onorai, Facca, Pozzetto, San Donato, Santa Croce Bigolina, Santa Maria

Government
  - Mayor: Luca Pierobon

Area
  - Total: 36 km^{2} (14 sq mi)
- Elevation: 48 m (157 ft)

Population (30 June 2017)
  - Total: 20,133
  - Density: 560/km^{2} (1,400/sq mi)
- Demonym: Cittadellesi
- Time zone: UTC+1 (CET)
  - Summer (DST): UTC+2 (CEST)
- Postal code: 35013
- Dialing code: 049
- Patron saint: San Prosdocimo, San Donato
- Website: Official website

Cittadella (Venetian: Sitadeła) is a medieval walled city in the province of Padua, northern Italy, founded in the 13th century as a military outpost of Padua. The surrounding wall has been restored and is 1,461 metres (4,793 ft) in circumference with a diameter of around 450 metres (1,480 ft). There are four gates which roughly correspond the points of the compass.

== Main sights ==
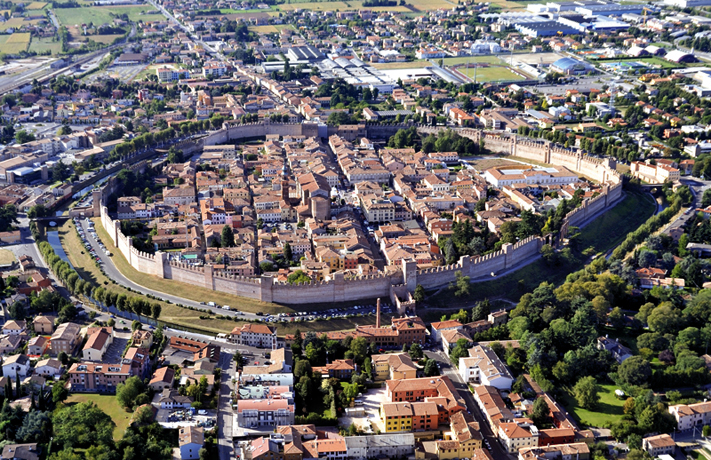
A view of Cittadella

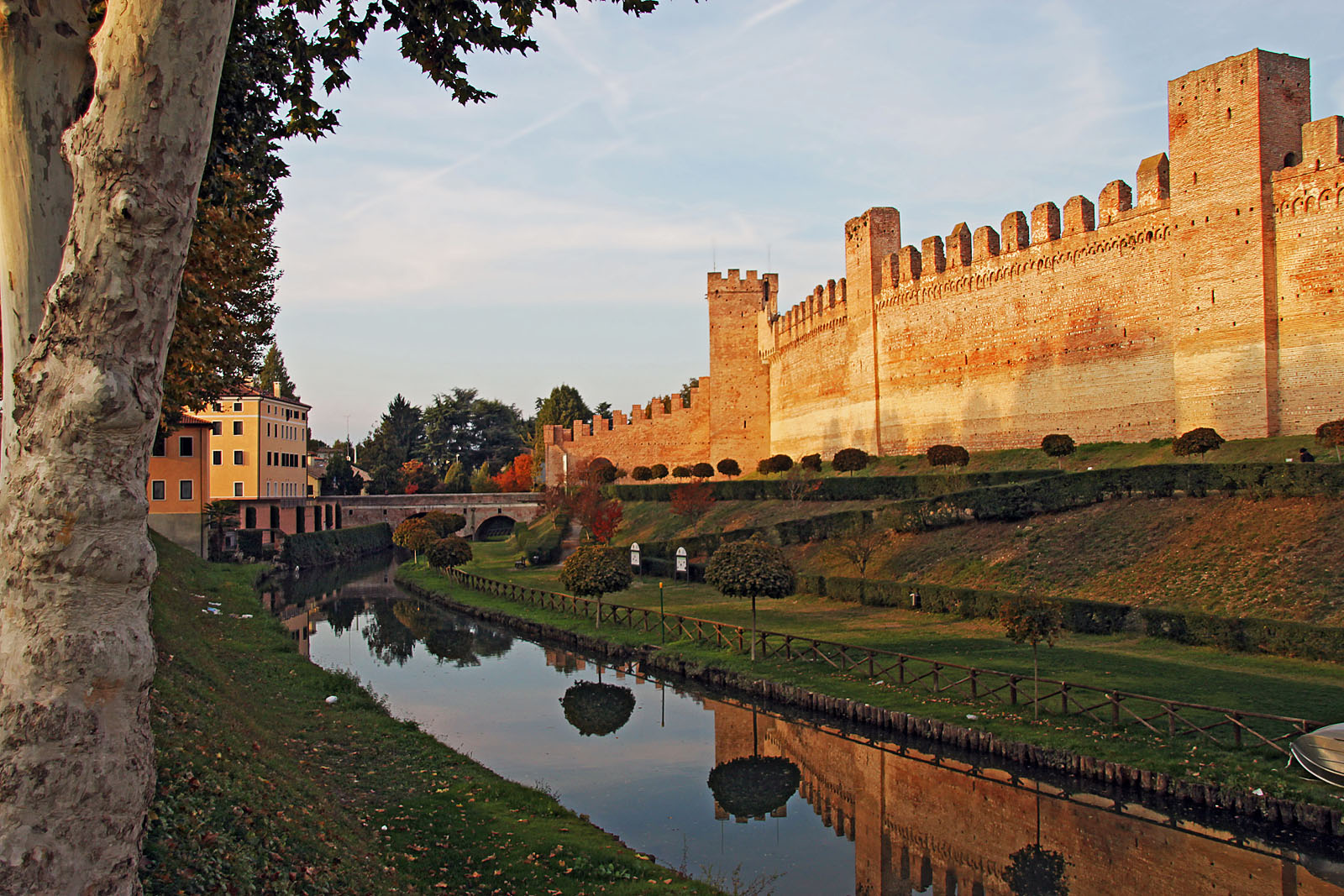
Cittadella walls

The town was founded in 1220 by the Paduans to counterbalance the fortification of Castelfranco Veneto, 13 kilometres (8 mi) to the E., in 1218 by the Trevisans. This was a time of war between the communes.

It was built in successive stages in a polygonal shape on orthogonal axes through the construction of 32 large and small towers, with the formation of a protective moat and with four drawbridges next to the four entrance gates.

Its walls, 14 to 16 metres (46 to 52 ft) tall, were built with the "box masonry": two parallel walls filled with a sturdy core of stones and hot slaked lime totaling a thickness of about 2.10 metres (6.9 ft).

The walls today are all intact except for a stretch destroyed in the 16th century during the Cambrai war, and the skilled detail of the construction are still easily visible. It has as many as seven different construction techniques characterized by the alteration of courses in brick and those in river rocks mixed with brick can be recognized.

Among the elements of interest, the Rocca di Porta Bassano still retains the defense apparatus of the keep and entrance gates. The Casa del Capitano (Captain's House) is found inside the Rocca (Fortress). Restoration has uncovered frescoes dating to the period of the Carraresi, Malatesta, Sanseverino and Borromeo families. They hand down an out-and-out historical account of the events that occurred between 1260 and 1600, almost replacing written documents.

To provide a better defense, the city walls originally could be traveled over on various levels through communication trenches, partly made of stone though many other stretches were made of wood or were made along the embankments that ran along the entire wall. The restoration of the merlons has been required, since they are a part most highly deteriorated by the wear and tear of time. Other goals in restoration has been the safekeeping and restoration of the patrol communications trench that winds along the walls at a height of 14 metres (46 ft). In addition, several new points of ascent to the walls have been established, via erection of stairs on the breach, as well as the construction of a stairway and glass lift inside the Porta Vicenza Tower, and stairs, the wooden gangway and the glazed entrance roof in the Torresino Church, plus the building of the connection between the Captain's House and the Porta Bassano Tower. Today the patrol communications trench has been restored and the entire circuit is walkable.

Complete restoration of Cittadella's fortified system will be completed over the next few years with a final restoration of the walls of the northeastern and southeasters sectors and with the conclusion of the works being carried out on the gates and towers.

Another town still preserving its walls in the region is Montagnana, Italy.

In 2011 the town enacted a law which stated that no more licences for shops selling kebabs may be granted to businesses within the city walls.

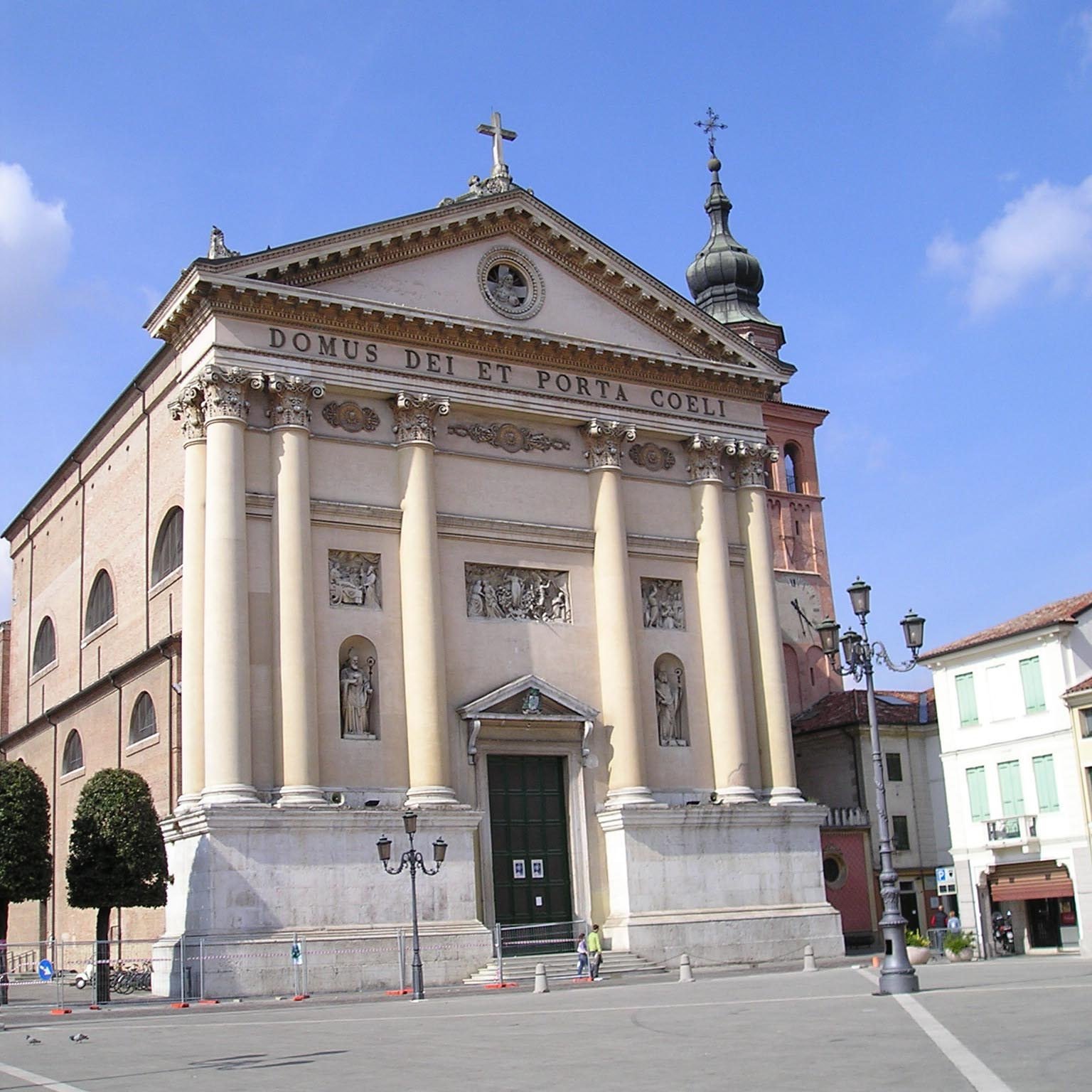
The Duomo (Cathedral) of Cittadella.

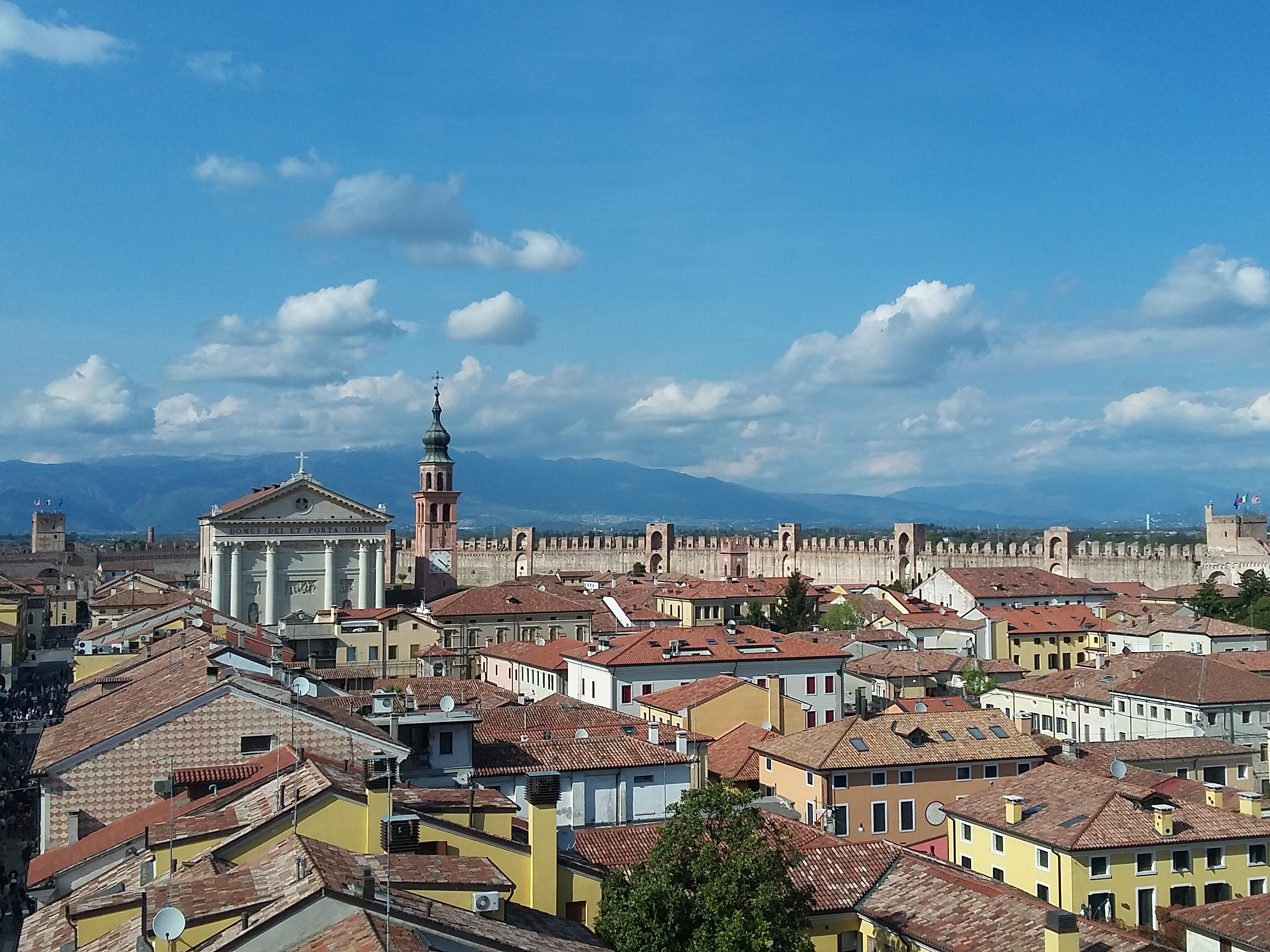
Cittadella seen from its walls

== Sports ==
The local football club is A.S. Cittadella.

== People ==
- Daniele Cappellari (born 1976), racing driver
- Paola Egonu (born 1998), professional volleyball player
- Arnaldo Rosin (born 1932), artist, illustrator and composer
- Soniko (born 2001), rapper, record producer and disc jockey

== Twin towns ==
- Nova Prata, Brazil, since 2005
- (United States) Noblesville, USA, since 2005
- Guben, Germany
