= 2005–06 in Italian football =

104th season of competitive football in Italy

The 2005–06 season was the 104th season of competitive football in Italy. Due to the Calciopoli scandal, the Serie A title was awarded to Inter Milan instead of Juventus, and were also relegated to Serie B the following season for the first time in its history. Juventus were also stripped of the previous season's Serie A title.

== Promotions and relegations (pre-season) ==
Teams promoted to Serie A

- Empoli
- Treviso
- Ascoli

Teams relegated from Serie A

- Bologna
- Brescia
- Atalanta

Teams promoted to Serie B

- Cremonese
- Mantova
- Rimini
- Avellino

Teams relegated from Serie B

- Perugia
- Salernitana
- Venezia
- Genoa

== League table ==
=== Serie A ===
Pos	Team	Pld	W	D	L	GF	GA	GD	Pts	Qualification or relegation
1	Inter Milan (C)	38	23	7	8	68	30	+38	76	Qualification to Champions League group stage
2	Roma	38	19	12	7	70	42	+28	69	Qualification to Champions League group stage
3	Milan (Note: Milan, Fiorentina and Lazio were docked 30 points, all for involvement in the Calciopoli.)	38	28	4	6	85	31	+54	58	Qualification to Champions League third qualifying round
4	Chievo	38	13	15	10	54	49	+5	54	Qualification to Champions League third qualifying round
5	Palermo	38	13	13	12	50	52	−2	52	Qualification to UEFA Cup first round
6	Livorno	38	12	13	13	37	44	−7	49	Qualification to UEFA Cup first round
7	Parma (Note: Parma gained entry to the 2006–07 UEFA Cup because 2005–06 Coppa Italia finalists Inter and Roma qualified to the 2006–07 UEFA Champions League and 2006–07 UEFA Cup through their respective championship positions. The final positions of Parma and Empoli were decided by head-to-head record.)	38	12	9	17	46	60	−14	45	Qualification to UEFA Cup first round
8	Empoli	38	13	6	19	47	61	−14	45	
9	Fiorentina	38	22	8	8	66	41	+25	44	
10	Ascoli	38	9	16	13	43	53	−10	43	
11	Udinese	38	11	10	17	40	54	−14	43	
12	Sampdoria	38	10	11	17	47	51	−4	41	
13	Reggina	38	11	8	19	39	65	−26	41	
14	Cagliari	38	8	15	15	42	55	−13	39	
15	Siena	38	9	12	17	42	60	−18	39	
16	Lazio	38	16	14	8	57	47	+10	32	
17	Messina (Note: Messina were restored to Serie A following Juventus's punishment.)	38	6	13	19	33	59	−26	31	
18	Lecce (R)	38	7	8	23	30	57	−27	29	Relegation to Serie B
19	Treviso (R)	38	3	12	23	24	56	−32	21	Relegation to Serie B
20	Juventus (Note: Juventus were originally the first-placed team, but were placed at the bottom of the league table (points were not deducted) due to the Calciopoli scandal, relegating them to Serie B. The title was put sub judice, then assigned to Internazionale, the team taking the first place after court hearings.) (D, R)	38	27	10	1	71	24	+47	91	Relegation to Serie B

Source: 2005–06 Serie A, Soccerway
Rules for classification: 1) points; 2) goal difference; 3) number of goals scored.
(C) Champions; (D) Disqualified; (R) Relegated

=== Serie B ===
Pos	Team	Pld	W	D	L	GF	GA	GD	Pts	Promotion or relegation
1	Atalanta (P, C)	42	24	9	9	61	39	+22	81	Promotion to Serie A
2	Catania (P)	42	22	12	8	67	42	+25	78	Promotion to Serie A
3	Torino (O, P)	42	21	13	8	51	31	+20	76	Qualification to promotion play-offs
4	Mantova	42	18	15	9	46	35	+11	69	Qualification to promotion play-offs
5	Modena	42	17	16	9	59	41	+18	67	Qualification to promotion play-offs
6	Cesena	42	18	12	12	66	54	+12	66	Qualification to promotion play-offs
7	Arezzo	42	17	15	10	45	34	+11	66	
8	Bologna	42	16	16	10	55	42	+13	64	
9	Crotone	42	18	9	15	56	48	+8	63	
10	Brescia	42	15	15	12	54	44	+10	60	
11	Pescara	42	14	12	16	41	50	−9	54	
12	Piacenza	42	13	15	14	56	52	+4	54	
13	Bari	42	11	18	13	43	47	−4	51	
14	Triestina	42	12	15	15	44	51	−7	51	
15	Hellas Verona	42	10	19	13	42	41	+1	49	
16	Vicenza	42	13	10	19	38	49	−11	49	
17	Rimini	42	11	15	16	42	49	−7	48	
18	AlbinoLeffe	42	10	16	16	38	52	−14	46	Qualification to relegation play-offs
19	Avellino (R)	42	11	13	18	42	62	−20	46	Qualification to relegation play-offs
20	Ternana (R)	42	7	18	17	36	58	−22	39	Relegation to Serie C1
21	Cremonese (R)	42	6	12	24	36	60	−24	30	Relegation to Serie C1
22	Catanzaro (R, E, R)	42	7	7	28	26	63	−37	28	Revival in Serie C2 (Note: Relegated and then restored directly in Serie C2 by the Lodo Petrucci for financial problems.)

Source: Almanacco Illustrato del Calcio 2007, Panini Edizioni, Modena, November 2006
Rules for classification: 1) points; 2) head-to-head points; 3) head-to-head goal difference; 4) head-to-head goals scored; 5) goal difference; 6) number of goals scored.
(C) Champions; (E) Eliminated; (O) Play-off winners; (P) Promoted; (R) Relegated

== National team ==
Team	Pld	W	D	L	GF	GA	GD	Pts
Italy	10	7	2	1	17	8	+9	23
Norway	10	5	3	2	12	7	+5	18
Scotland	10	3	4	3	9	7	+2	13
Slovenia	10	3	3	4	10	13	−3	12
Belarus	10	2	4	4	12	14	−2	10
Moldova	10	1	2	7	5	16	−11	5
