= 2005–06 Coppa Italia =

Tournament details
- Country: Italy
- Dates: 7 Aug 2005 – 11 May 2006
- Teams: 72

Final positions
- Champions: Internazionale (5th title)
- Runners-up: Roma

Tournament statistics
- Matches played: 86
- Goals scored: 193 (2.24 per match)
- Top goal scorer(s): Alessandro Del Piero (5 goals)

The 2005–06 Coppa Italia was the 59th edition of the national domestic tournament. For the second consecutive season, Roma and Internazionale were the finalists. Inter won the tournament by a score of 4–1 aggregate in the final. It began on August 7, 2005 and ended on May 11, 2006.

== First round ==
| Team 1 | Score | Team 2 |
|---|---|---|
| Sangiovannese | 0–2 | Crotone |
| Empoli | 2–1 | Pizzighettone |
| Padova | 3–0¹ | Triestina |
| Cavese | 0–1 | Parma |
| Cittadella | 3–2 | Modena |
| Lumezzane | 1–2 | Ternana |
| Genoa | 0–3 | Catanzaro |
| Livorno | 3–0 | Forlì |
| Treviso | 0–1 | Manfredonia |
| Pro Patria | 0–1 | AlbinoLeffe |
| Grosseto | 2–0 | Mantova |
| San Marino | 1–3 | Cagliari |
| Frosinone | 0–3² | Avellino |
| Juve Stabia | 1–2 | Siena |
| Pisa | 1–1 (6-5 p) | Catania |
| Massese | 0–1 | Atalanta |
| Lanciano | 0–3 | Arezzo |
| Pro Sesto | 0–1 | Brescia |
| Sambenedettese | 2–4 | Cremonese |
| Valenzana | 0–5 | Chievo |
| Monza | 1–1 (5–3 p) | Lecce |
| Pavia | 0–0 (4–5 p) | Vicenza |
| Martina | 1–2 | Bari |
| Ascoli | 2–0 | Acireale |
| Napoli | 2–0 | Pescara |
| Giugliano | 1–2 (aet) | Reggina |
| Lucchese | 1–2 (aet) | Piacenza |
| Hellas Verona | 2–0 | Teramo |
| Spezia | 0–1 (aet) | Cesena |
| Ravenna | 0–1 | Bologna |
| Pistoiese | 0–1 | Rimini |
| Fiorentina | 4–0 | Cisco Roma |

== Second round ==
| Team 1 | Score | Team 2 |
|---|---|---|
| Crotone | 2–3 (aet) | Empoli |
| Padova | 0–1 | Parma |
| Cittadella | 0–0 (7–6 p) | Ternana |
| Catanzaro | 0–0 (2–4 p) | Livorno |
| Manfredonia | 3–2 | AlbinoLeffe |
| Grosseto | 1–2 | Cagliari |
| Avellino | 0–1 | Siena |
| Pisa | 0–1 | Atalanta |
| Arezzo | 2–2 (4–5 p.) | Brescia |
| Cremonese | 0–1 | Chievo |
| Monza | 0–0 (4–5 p) | Pavia |
| Bari | 2–1 | Ascoli |
| Napoli | 1–0 | Reggina |
| Piacenza | 2–1 | Hellas Verona |
| Cesena | 1–0 | Bologna |
| Rimini | 1–2 (aet) | Fiorentina |

== Third round ==
| Team 1 | Score | Team 2 |
|---|---|---|
| Empoli | 1–1 (7–8 p) | Parma |
| Cittadella | 3–2 | Livorno |
| Manfredonia | 2–2 (4–6 p) | Cagliari |
| Siena | 0–4 | Atalanta |
| Brescia | 1–0 | Chievo |
| Pavia | 0–0 (5–6 p) | Bari |
| Napoli | 1–0 | Piacenza |
| Cesena | 0–1 | Fiorentina |

== Knockout stage ==
Round of 16
Sampdoria | 1 | 2 | 3
Cagliari | 1 | 1 | 2
Udinese | 0 | 3 | 3
Atalanta | 1 | 1 | 2
Internazionale | 1 | 0 | 1
Parma | 0 | 0 | 0
Cittadella | 0 | 0 | 0
Lazio | 2 | 0 | 2
Roma | 3 | 2 | 5
Napoli | 0 | 1 | 1
Juventus | 2 | 4 | 6
Fiorentina | 2 | 1 | 3
Palermo | 0 | 5 | 5
Bari | 0 | 4 | 4
Brescia | 1 | 3 | 4
Milan | 3 | 4 | 7

Quarter-finals
Sampdoria | 1 | 2 | 3
Udinese (a) | 1 | 2 | 3
Internazionale | 1 | 1 | 2
Lazio | 1 | 0 | 1
Roma (a) | 3 | 0 | 3
Juventus | 2 | 1 | 3
Palermo | 0 | 3 | 3
Milan | 1 | 0 | 1

Semi-finals
Udinese | 0 | 2 | 2
Internazionale | 1 | 2 | 3
Roma (a) | 1 | 1 | 2
Palermo | 2 | 0 | 2

Finals
Internazionale | 1 | 3 | 4
Roma | 1 | 1 | 2

== Final ==
=== First leg ===
3 May 2006
20:45

| Roma | 1–1 | Internazionale |
|---|---|---|
| Mancini 55' | | Cruz 8' |

Stadio Olimpico, Rome
Attendance: 64,000
Referee: Matteo Trefoloni

=== Second leg ===
11 May 2006
20:45

| Internazionale | 3–1 | Roma |
|---|---|---|
| Cambiasso 6'; Cruz 46'; Martins 76' | | Nonda 80' |

San Siro, Milan
Attendance: 59,000
Referee: Domenico Messina

Internazionale won 4–2 on aggregate.

== Top goalscorers ==
| Rank | Player | Club | Goals |
|---|---|---|---|
| 1 | (Italy) Alessandro Del Piero | Juventus | 5 |
| 2 | (Argentina) Mariano González | Palermo | 4 |
