= SK Slavia Prague in European football =

- Club: SK Slavia Prague
- First entry: 1974–75 European Cup Winners' Cup
- Latest entry: 2026–27 UEFA Champions League

SK Slavia Prague (Czech: SK Slavia Praha, pronounced [ˈslaːvɪja ˈpraɦa]) is a Czech professional football club founded in 1892 in the city of Prague. The club's first appearance in UEFA competitions was in the 1974–75 European Cup Winners' Cup. The club's best performance is reaching the semi-finals of the UEFA Cup, which they managed in the 1995–96 season.

This is the list of all SK Slavia Prague's European matches.

== Overall record ==
Accurate as of 20 October 2026

Competition	Pld	W	D	L	GF	GA	GD	W%
UEFA Champions League	61	16	16	29	49	93	−44	26.23
UEFA Cup Winners' Cup	8	3	3	2	11	9	+2	37.50
UEFA Cup / UEFA Europa League	163	60	42	61	213	198	+15	36.81
UEFA Europa Conference League	25	12	6	7	52	32	+20	48.00
Total	257	91	67	99	325	332	−7	35.41

Source: UEFA.com
Pld = Matches played; W = Matches won; D = Matches drawn; L = Matches lost; GF = Goals for; GA = Goals against; GD = Goal difference.

== Results ==
Season	Competition	Round	Opposition	Home	Away	Aggregate	Reference
1974–75	European Cup Winners' Cup	First round	(East Germany) Carl Zeiss Jena	1–0	0–1	1–1 (2–3 p)	
1976–77	UEFA Cup	First round	(Bulgaria) Akademik Sofia	2–0	0–3 (a.e.t.)	2–3	
1977–78	UEFA Cup	First round	(Belgium) Standard Liège	3–2	0–1	3–3 (a)	
1985–86	UEFA Cup	First round	(Scotland) St Mirren	1–0	0–3 (a.e.t.)	1–3	
1992–93	UEFA Cup	First round	(Scotland) Heart of Midlothian	1–0	2–4	3–4	
1993–94	UEFA Cup	First round	(Greece) OFI	1–1	0–1	1–2	
1994–95	UEFA Cup	Preliminary round	(Republic of Ireland) Cork City	2–0	4–0	6–0	
1994–95	UEFA Cup	First round	(Sweden) AIK	2–2	0–0	2–2 (a)	
1995–96	UEFA Cup	Preliminary round	(Austria) Sturm Graz	1–1	1–0	2–1	
1995–96	UEFA Cup	First round	(Germany) SC Freiburg	0–0	2–1	2–1	
1995–96	UEFA Cup	Second round	(Switzerland) Lugano	1–0	2–1	3–1	
1995–96	UEFA Cup	Third round	(France) Lens	0–0	1–0 (a.e.t.)	1–0	
1995–96	UEFA Cup	Quarter-finals	(Italy) Roma	2–0	1–3 (a.e.t.)	3–3 (a)	
1995–96	UEFA Cup	Semi-finals	(France) Bordeaux	0–1	0–1	0–2	
1996–97	UEFA Champions League	Qualifying round	(Switzerland) Grasshopper	0–1	0–5	0–6	
1996–97	UEFA Cup	First round	(Sweden) Malmö FF	3–1	2–1	5–2	
1996–97	UEFA Cup	Second round	(Spain) Valencia	0–1	0–0	0–1	
1997–98	UEFA Cup Winners' Cup	First round	(Switzerland) Luzern	4–2	2–0	6–2	
1997–98	UEFA Cup Winners' Cup	Second round	(France) Nice	1–1	2–2	3–3 (a)	
1997–98	UEFA Cup Winners' Cup	Quarter-finals	(Germany) VfB Stuttgart	1–1	0–2	1–3	
1998–99	UEFA Cup	Second qualifying round	(Slovakia) Inter Bratislava	4–0	0–2	4–2	
1998–99	UEFA Cup	First round	(Germany) Schalke 04	1–0 (a.e.t.)	0–1	1–1 (5–4 p)	
1998–99	UEFA Cup	Second round	(Italy) Bologna	0–2	1–2	4–1	
1999–2000	UEFA Cup	First round	(Federal Republic of Yugoslavia) FK Vojvodina	3–2	0–0	3–2	
1999–2000	UEFA Cup	Second round	(Switzerland) Grasshopper	3–1	0–1	3–2	
1999–2000	UEFA Cup	Third round	(Romania) Steaua București	4–1	1–1	5–2	
1999–2000	UEFA Cup	Fourth round	(Italy) Udinese	1–0	1–2	2–2 (a)	
1999–2000	UEFA Cup	Quarter-finals	(England) Leeds United	2–1	0–3	2–4	
2000–01	UEFA Champions League	Second qualifying round	(Azerbaijan) FK Shamkir	1–0	4–1	5–1	
2000–01	UEFA Champions League	Third qualifying round	(Ukraine) Shakhtar Donetsk	0–2 (a.e.t.)	1–0	1–2	
2000–01	UEFA Cup	First round	(Denmark) Aalborg BK	3–0	2–0	5–0	
2000–01	UEFA Cup	Second round	(Greece) OFI	4–1	2–2	6–3	
2000–01	UEFA Cup	Third round	(Croatia) Osijek	5–1	0–2	5–3	
2000–01	UEFA Cup	Fourth round	(Germany) 1. FC Kaiserslautern	0–0	0–1	0–1	
2001–02	UEFA Champions League	Third qualifying round	(Greece) Panathinaikos	1–2	0–1	1–3	
2001–02	UEFA Cup	First round	(Switzerland) Servette	1–1	0–1	1–2	
2002–03	UEFA Cup	First round	(Belgium) Mouscron	5–1	2–2	7–3	
2002–03	UEFA Cup	Second round	(Federal Republic of Yugoslavia) Partizan	5–1 (a.e.t.)	1–3	6–4	
2002–03	UEFA Cup	Third round	(Greece) PAOK	4–0	0–1	4–1	
2002–03	UEFA Cup	Fourth round	(Turkey) Beşiktaş	1–0	2–4	3–4	
2003–04	UEFA Champions League	Second qualifying round	(Bosnia and Herzegovina) FK Leotar	2–0	2–1	4–1	
2003–04	UEFA Champions League	Third qualifying round	(Spain) Celta Vigo	2–0	0–3	2–3	
2003–04	UEFA Cup	First round	(Serbia and Montenegro) Smederevo	2–1	2–1	4–2	
2003–04	UEFA Cup	Second round	(Bulgaria) Levski Sofia	2–2	0–0	2–2 (a)	
2004–05	UEFA Cup	Second qualifying round	(Georgia (country)) Dinamo Tbilisi	3–1	0–2	3–3 (a)	
2005–06	UEFA Champions League	Third qualifying round	(Belgium) Anderlecht	0–2	1–2	1–4	
2005–06	UEFA Cup	First round	(Republic of Ireland) Cork City	2–0	2–1	4–1	
2005–06	UEFA Cup	Group stage	(Bulgaria) CSKA Sofia	4–2	—N/a	3rd	
2005–06	UEFA Cup	Group stage	(Norway) Viking	—N/a	2–2	3rd	
2005–06	UEFA Cup	Group stage	(France) Monaco	0–2	—N/a	3rd	
2005–06	UEFA Cup	Group stage	(Germany) Hamburger SV	—N/a	0–2	3rd	
2005–06	UEFA Cup	Round of 32	(Italy) Palermo	2–1	0–1	2–2 (a)	
2006–07	UEFA Cup	Second qualifying round	(Azerbaijan) Karvan	0–0	2–0	2–0	
2006–07	UEFA Cup	First round	(England) Tottenham Hotspur	0–1	0–1	0–2	
2007–08	UEFA Champions League	Second qualifying round	(Slovakia) MŠK Žilina	0–0	0–0	0–0 (4–3 p)	
2007–08	UEFA Champions League	Third qualifying round	(Netherlands) Ajax	2–1	1–0	3–1	
2007–08	UEFA Champions League	Group stage	(Romania) Steaua București	2–1	1–1	3rd	
2007–08	UEFA Champions League	Group stage	(Spain) Sevilla	0–3	2–4	3rd	
2007–08	UEFA Champions League	Group stage	(England) Arsenal	0–0	0–7	3rd	
2007–08	UEFA Cup	Round of 32	(England) Tottenham Hotspur	1–2	1–1	2–3	
2008–09	UEFA Champions League	Third qualifying round	(Italy) Fiorentina	0–2	0–0	0–2	
2008–09	UEFA Cup	First round	(Romania) Vaslui	0–0	1–1	1–1 (a)	
2008–09	UEFA Cup	Group stage	(England) Aston Villa	0–1	—N/a	5th	
2008–09	UEFA Cup	Group stage	(Slovakia) MŠK Žilina	—N/a	0–0	5th	
2008–09	UEFA Cup	Group stage	(Germany) Hamburger SV	0–2	—N/a	5th	
2008–09	UEFA Cup	Group stage	(Netherlands) Ajax	—N/a	2–2	5th	
2009–10	UEFA Champions League	Third qualifying round	(Moldova) Sheriff Tiraspol	1–1	0–0	1–1 (a)	
2009–10	UEFA Europa League	Play-off round	(Serbia) Red Star Belgrade	3–0	1–2	4–2	
2009–10	UEFA Europa League	Group stage	(Italy) Genoa	0–0	0–2	4th	
2009–10	UEFA Europa League	Group stage	(France) Lille	1–3	1–5	4th	
2009–10	UEFA Europa League	Group stage	(Spain) Valencia	2–2	1–1	4th	
2016–17	UEFA Europa League	Second qualifying round	(Estonia) Levadia Tallinn	2–0	1–3	3–3 (a)	
2016–17	UEFA Europa League	Third qualifying round	(Portugal) Rio Ave	0–0	1–1	1–1 (a)	
2016–17	UEFA Europa League	Play-off round	(Belgium) Anderlecht	0–3	0–3	0–6	
2017–18	UEFA Champions League	Third qualifying round	(Belarus) BATE Borisov	1–0	1–2	2–2 (a)	
2017–18	UEFA Champions League	Play-off round	(Cyprus) APOEL	0–0	0–2	0–2	
2017–18	UEFA Europa League	Group stage	(Israel) Maccabi Tel Aviv	1–0	2–0	3rd	
2017–18	UEFA Europa League	Group stage	(Kazakhstan) Astana	0–1	1–1	3rd	
2017–18	UEFA Europa League	Group stage	(Spain) Villarreal	0–2	2–2	3rd	
2018–19	UEFA Champions League	Third qualifying round	(Ukraine) Dynamo Kyiv	1–1	0–2	1–3	
2018–19	UEFA Europa League	Group stage	(France) Bordeaux	1–0	0–2	2nd	
2018–19	UEFA Europa League	Group stage	(Russia) Zenit Saint Petersburg	2–0	0–1	2nd	
2018–19	UEFA Europa League	Group stage	(Denmark) Copenhagen	0–0	1–0	2nd	
2018–19	UEFA Europa League	Round of 32	(Belgium) Genk	0–0	4–1	4–1	
2018–19	UEFA Europa League	Round of 16	(Spain) Sevilla	4–3 (a.e.t.)	2–2	6–5	
2018–19	UEFA Europa League	Quarter-finals	(England) Chelsea	0–1	3–4	3–5	
2019–20	UEFA Champions League	Play-off round	(Romania) CFR Cluj	1–0	1–0	2–0	
2019–20	UEFA Champions League	Group stage	(Italy) Internazionale	1–3	1–1	4th	
2019–20	UEFA Champions League	Group stage	(Germany) Borussia Dortmund	0–2	1–2	4th	
2019–20	UEFA Champions League	Group stage	(Spain) Barcelona	1–2	0–0	4th	
2020–21	UEFA Champions League	Play-off round	(Denmark) Midtjylland	0–0	1–4	1–4	
2020–21	UEFA Europa League	Group stage	(Germany) Bayer Leverkusen	1–0	0–4	2nd	
2020–21	UEFA Europa League	Group stage	(Israel) Hapoel Be'er Sheva	3–0	1–3	2nd	
2020–21	UEFA Europa League	Group stage	(France) Nice	3–2	3–1	2nd	
2020–21	UEFA Europa League	Round of 32	(England) Leicester City	0–0	2–0	2–0	
2020–21	UEFA Europa League	Round of 16	(Scotland) Rangers	1–1	2–0	3–1	
2020–21	UEFA Europa League	Quarter-finals	(England) Arsenal	0–4	1–1	1–5	
2021–22	UEFA Champions League	Third qualifying round	(Hungary) Ferencváros	1–0	0–2	1–2	
2021–22	UEFA Europa League	Play-off round	(Poland) Legia Warsaw	2–2	1–2	3–4	
2021–22	UEFA Europa Conference League	Group stage	(Netherlands) Feyenoord	2–2	1–2	2nd	
2021–22	UEFA Europa Conference League	Group stage	(Germany) Union Berlin	3–1	1–1	2nd	
2021–22	UEFA Europa Conference League	Group stage	(Israel) Maccabi Haifa	1–0	0–1	2nd	
2021–22	UEFA Europa Conference League	Knockout round play-offs	(Turkey) Fenerbahçe	3–2	3–2	6–4	
2021–22	UEFA Europa Conference League	Round of 16	(Austria) LASK	4–1	3–4	7–5	
2021–22	UEFA Europa Conference League	Quarter-finals	(Netherlands) Feyenoord	1–3	3–3	4–6	
2022–23	UEFA Europa Conference League	Second qualifying round	(Gibraltar) St Joseph's	7–0	4–0	11–0	
2022–23	UEFA Europa Conference League	Third qualifying round	(Greece) Panathinaikos	2–0	1–1	3–1	
2022–23	UEFA Europa Conference League	Play-off round	(Poland) Raków Częstochowa	2–0 (a.e.t.)	1–2	3–2	
2022–23	UEFA Europa Conference League	Group stage	(Turkey) Sivasspor	1–1	1–1	3rd	
2022–23	UEFA Europa Conference League	Group stage	(Kosovo) Ballkani	3–2	1–0	3rd	
2022–23	UEFA Europa Conference League	Group stage	(Romania) CFR Cluj	0–1	0–2	3rd	
2023–24	UEFA Europa League	Third qualifying round	(Ukraine) Dnipro-1	3–0	1–1	4–1	
2023–24	UEFA Europa League	Play-off round	(Ukraine) Zorya Luhansk	2–0	1–2	3–2	
2023–24	UEFA Europa League	Group stage	(Italy) Roma	2–0	0–2	1st	
2023–24	UEFA Europa League	Group stage	(Moldova) Sheriff Tiraspol	6–0	3–2	1st	
2023–24	UEFA Europa League	Group stage	(Switzerland) Servette	4–0	2–0	1st	
2023–24	UEFA Europa League	Round of 16	(Italy) Milan	1–3	2–4	3–7	
2024–25	UEFA Champions League	Third qualifying round	(Belgium) Union Saint-Gilloise	3–1	1–0	4–1	
2024–25	UEFA Champions League	Play-off round	(France) Lille	2–1	0–2	2–3	
2024–25	UEFA Europa League	League phase	(Bulgaria) Ludogorets Razgrad	—N/a	2–0	30th	
2024–25	UEFA Europa League	League phase	(Netherlands) Ajax	1–1	—N/a	30th	
2024–25	UEFA Europa League	League phase	(Spain) Athletic Bilbao	—N/a	0–1	30th	
2024–25	UEFA Europa League	League phase	(Germany) Eintracht Frankfurt	—N/a	0–1	30th	
2024–25	UEFA Europa League	League phase	(Turkey) Fenerbahçe	1–2	—N/a	30th	
2024–25	UEFA Europa League	League phase	(Belgium) Anderlecht	1–2	—N/a	30th	
2024–25	UEFA Europa League	League phase	(Greece) PAOK	—N/a	0–2	30th	
2024–25	UEFA Europa League	League phase	(Sweden) Malmö FF	2–2	—N/a	30th	
2025–26	UEFA Champions League	League phase	(Norway) Bodø/Glimt	2–2	—N/a	34th	
2025–26	UEFA Champions League	League phase	(Italy) Internazionale	—N/a	0–3	34th	
2025–26	UEFA Champions League	League phase	(Italy) Atalanta	—N/a	0–0	34th	
2025–26	UEFA Champions League	League phase	(England) Arsenal	0–3	—N/a	34th	
2025–26	UEFA Champions League	League phase	(Spain) Athletic Bilbao	0–0	—N/a	34th	
2025–26	UEFA Champions League	League phase	(England) Tottenham Hotspur	—N/a	0–3	34th	
2025–26	UEFA Champions League	League phase	(Spain) Barcelona	2–4	—N/a	34th	
2025–26	UEFA Champions League	League phase	(Cyprus) Pafos	—N/a	1–4	34th	
2026–27	UEFA Champions League	League phase	(France) Lens	2–3	—N/a		
2026–27	UEFA Champions League	League phase	(Azerbaijan) Sabah	—N/a	0–2		
2026–27	UEFA Champions League	League phase	(Turkey) Fenerbahçe	—N/a	2–2		
2026–27	UEFA Champions League	League phase	(England) Arsenal		—N/a		
2026–27	UEFA Champions League	League phase	(Spain) Villarreal		—N/a		
2026–27	UEFA Champions League	League phase	(Germany) Bayern Munich	—N/a			
2026–27	UEFA Champions League	League phase	(Portugal) Porto	—N/a			
2026–27	UEFA Champions League	League phase	(England) Aston Villa		—N/a		
