= 2004–05 Primera Divisió =

Primera Divisió
- Season: 2004–05
- Champions: Sant Julià
- Relegated: Encamp
- UEFA Cup: Sant Julià
- UEFA Intertoto Cup: Rànger's
- Matches played: 80
- Goals scored: 291 (3.64 per match)

Statistics of Primera Divisió in the 2004–2005 season.

== Overview ==
It was contested by 8 teams, and UE Sant Julià won the championship.

== First round ==
| Pos | Team | Pld | W | D | L | GF | GA | GD | Pts | Qualification |
|---|---|---|---|---|---|---|---|---|---|---|
| 1 | Sant Julià | 14 | 13 | 0 | 1 | 42 | 8 | +34 | 39 | Qualification to Championship round |
| 2 | Rànger's | 14 | 12 | 0 | 2 | 46 | 13 | +33 | 36 | Qualification to Championship round |
| 3 | FC Santa Coloma | 14 | 11 | 0 | 3 | 43 | 15 | +28 | 33 | Qualification to Championship round |
| 4 | Principat | 14 | 6 | 1 | 7 | 19 | 21 | −2 | 19 | Qualification to Championship round |
| 5 | Inter d'Escaldes | 14 | 5 | 2 | 7 | 27 | 37 | −10 | 17 | Qualification to Relegation round |
| 6 | Encamp | 14 | 2 | 2 | 10 | 11 | 32 | −21 | 8 | Qualification to Relegation round |
| 7 | Lusitans | 14 | 2 | 1 | 11 | 13 | 37 | −24 | 7 | Qualification to Relegation round |
| 8 | Atlètic d'Escaldes | 14 | 2 | 0 | 12 | 11 | 49 | −38 | 6 | Qualification to Relegation round |

Rules for classification: 1) points; 2) head-to-head points; 3) head-to-head goal difference; 4) goal difference; 5) number of goals scored; 6) fair-play points; 7) playoff match

| Home \ Away | ATL | ENC | INT | LUS | PRI | RAN | SFC | SJU |
|---|---|---|---|---|---|---|---|---|
| Atlètic d'Escaldes | | 3–0 | 0–4 | 1–3 | 0–2 | 1–4 | 0–5 | 0–2 |
| Encamp | 2–0 | | 0–3 | 1–2 | 0–2 | 0–2 | 2–6 | 0–2 |
| Inter d'Escaldes | 5–3 | 0–0 | | 1–1 | 1–0 | 3–8 | 2–3 | 0–5 |
| Lusitans | 0–1 | 2–3 | 1–2 | | 0–1 | 0–2 | 0–3 | 1–7 |
| Principat | 5–2 | 1–1 | 4–3 | 2–0 | | 0–1 | 0–5 | 0–2 |
| Rànger's | 8–0 | 3–0 | 5–0 | 5–1 | 2–0 | | 3–2 | 0–3 |
| FC Santa Coloma | 5–0 | 3–1 | 4–1 | 3–1 | 3–2 | 0–1 | | 1–0 |
| Sant Julià | 4–0 | 3–1 | 3–2 | 5–1 | 1–0 | 3–2 | 2–0 | |

Legend: Blue = home team win; Yellow = draw; Red = away team win.

== Second round ==
=== Championship Round ===
| Pos | Team | Pld | W | D | L | GF | GA | GD | Pts | Qualification |
|---|---|---|---|---|---|---|---|---|---|---|
| 1 | Sant Julià (C) | 20 | 18 | 0 | 2 | 61 | 14 | +47 | 54 | Qualification to UEFA Cup first qualifying round |
| 2 | Rànger's | 20 | 17 | 0 | 3 | 59 | 15 | +44 | 51 | Qualification to Intertoto Cup first round |
| 3 | FC Santa Coloma | 20 | 12 | 1 | 7 | 50 | 26 | +24 | 37 | |
| 4 | Principat | 20 | 6 | 2 | 12 | 23 | 45 | −22 | 20 | |

Rules for classification: 1) points; 2) head-to-head points; 3) head-to-head goal difference; 4) goal difference; 5) number of goals scored; 6) fair-play points; 7) playoff match
(C) Champions

| Home \ Away | PRI | RAN | SFC | SJU |
|---|---|---|---|---|
| Principat | | 0–5 | 1–2 | 1–4 |
| Rànger's | 3–0 | | 2–0 | 0–1 |
| FC Santa Coloma | 2–2 | 0–1 | | 1–2 |
| Sant Julià | 8–0 | 1–2 | 3–2 | |

Legend: Blue = home team win; Yellow = draw; Red = away team win.

=== Relegation Round ===
| Pos | Team | Pld | W | D | L | GF | GA | GD | Pts | Relegation |
|---|---|---|---|---|---|---|---|---|---|---|
| 1 | Inter d'Escaldes | 20 | 7 | 4 | 9 | 36 | 44 | −8 | 25 | |
| 2 | Lusitans | 20 | 5 | 2 | 13 | 24 | 48 | −24 | 17 | |
| 3 | Atlètic d'Escaldes | 20 | 5 | 0 | 15 | 19 | 58 | −39 | 15 | |
| 4 | Encamp (R) | 20 | 4 | 3 | 13 | 19 | 41 | −22 | 15 | Relegation to Segona Divisió |

Rules for classification: 1) points; 2) head-to-head points; 3) head-to-head goal difference; 4) goal difference; 5) number of goals scored; 6) fair-play points; 7) playoff match
(R) Relegated

| Home \ Away | ATL | ENC | INT | LUS |
|---|---|---|---|---|
| Atlètic d'Escaldes | | 3–0 | 3–2 | 1–2 |
| Encamp | 2–0 | | 0–0 | 4–2 |
| Inter d'Escaldes | 0–1 | 2–1 | | 2–2 |
| Lusitans | 3–0 | 2–1 | 0–3 | |

Legend: Blue = home team win; Yellow = draw; Red = away team win.
