= 2005–06 UEFA Cup group stage =

International football competition

The group stage of the 2005–06 UEFA Cup is the second stage of the competition proper. Group stage matches began on 20 October 2005 and concluded on 15 December 2005. The top three teams in each group progressed to the Round of 32, to be joined by the eight third-place finishers from the Champions League group stage.

== Teams ==
The group stage draw took place on 4 October 2005 at the UEFA headquarters in Nyon, Switzerland. The following teams qualified for the group stage:

Key to colours
Group winners, runners-up and third-placed teams advanced to round of 32

Pot 1
Team	Coeff.
(Russia) CSKA Moscow	34.469
(Italy) Roma	73.191
(Germany) VfB Stuttgart	58.166
(France) Monaco	53.324
(Germany) Hertha BSC	46.166
(Russia) Lokomotiv Moscow	38.469
(Turkey) Beşiktaş	37.872
(Netherlands) AZ	37.145

Pot 2
Team	Coeff.
(Spain) Sevilla	36.326
(France) Marseille	36.324
(Greece) PAOK	35.715
(Czech Republic) Slavia Prague	35.233
(Switzerland) Basel	33.887
(England) Middlesbrough	32.864
(Spain) Espanyol	29.326
(France) Lens	29.324

Pot 3
Team	Coeff.
(Ukraine) Shakhtar Donetsk	28.200
(Netherlands) Heerenveen	26.145
(Ukraine) Dnipro Dnipropetrovsk	24.200
(Germany) Hamburger SV	24.166
(Serbia and Montenegro) Red Star Belgrade	21.012
(England) Bolton Wanderers	20,864
(Italy) Sampdoria	20.191
(Italy) Palermo	20.191

Pot 4
Team	Coeff.
(Romania) Steaua București	20.101
(Denmark) Brøndby	19.676
(Switzerland) Grasshopper	18.887
(Russia) Zenit Saint Petersburg	18.469
(Bulgaria) Levski Sofia	18.118
(France) Strasbourg	17.324
(France) Rennes	16.324
(Bulgaria) CSKA Sofia	15.118

Pot 5
Team	Coeff.
(Portugal) Vitória de Guimarães	14.739
(Bulgaria) Litex Lovech	14.118
(Sweden) Halmstads BK	13.076
(Norway) Viking	12.665
(Romania) Dinamo București	12.101
(Romania) Rapid București	8.101
(Israel) Maccabi Petah Tikva	7.218
(Norway) Tromsø	6.665

Notes

1. ^{TH} Title holders

== Tie-breaking criteria ==
Based on paragraph 6.06 in the UEFA regulations for the current season, if two or more teams are equal on points on completion of the group matches, the following criteria are applied to determine the rankings:

1. superior goal difference from all group matches played;
2. higher number of goals scored;
3. higher number of goals scored away;
4. higher number of wins;
5. higher number of away wins;
6. higher number of coefficient points accumulated by the club in question, as well as its association, over the previous five seasons.

== Groups ==
All times are CET, as listed by UEFA.

=== Group A ===
Pos	Team	Pld	W	D	L	GF	GA	GD	Pts	Qualification	MON	HSV	SLA	VIK	CSS
1	(France) Monaco	4	3	0	1	6	2	+4	9	Advance to knockout stage	—	2–0	—	—	2–1
2	(Germany) Hamburger SV	4	3	0	1	5	2	+3	9	Advance to knockout stage	—	—	2–0	2–0	—
3	(Czech Republic) Slavia Prague	4	1	1	2	6	8	−2	4	Advance to knockout stage	0–2	—	—	—	4–2
4	(Norway) Viking	4	1	1	2	3	6	−3	4		1–0	—	2–2	—	—
5	(Bulgaria) CSKA Sofia	4	1	0	3	5	7	−2	3		—	0–1	—	2–0	—

20 October 2005
18:00

Viking (Norway)	1–0	(France) Monaco
Nhleko 18'	Report

Viking Stadion, Stavanger
Attendance: 9,684
Referee: Gerald Lehner (Austria)
20 October 2005
20:15

CSKA Sofia (Bulgaria)	0–1	(Germany) Hamburger SV
	Report	Van der Vaart 57'

Balgarska Armiya Stadium, Sofia
Attendance: 17,585
Referee: Pedro Proença (Portugal)

3 November 2005
18:30

Hamburger SV (Germany)	2–0	(Norway) Viking
Van der Vaart 21'; Lauth 66'	Report

Volksparkstadion, Hamburg
Attendance: 37,521
Referee: Romāns Lajuks (Latvia)
3 November 2005
20:00

Slavia Prague (Czech Republic)	4–2	(Bulgaria) CSKA Sofia
Fořt 5', 75'; Vlček 36'; Piták 56'	Report	Gargorov 10'; Sakaliev 58'

Stadion Evžena Rošického, Prague
Attendance: 7,171
Referee: Serhiy Shebek (Ukraine)

24 November 2005
18:00

Viking (Norway)	2–2	(Czech Republic) Slavia Prague
Nhleko 26'; Gaarde 55'	Report	Vlček 51'; Piták 83'

Viking Stadion, Stavanger
Attendance: 7,941
Referee: Attila Hanacsek (Hungary)
24 November 2005
21:00

Monaco (France)	2–0	(Germany) Hamburger SV
Adebayor 44'; Veigneau 90'	Report

Stade Louis II, Monaco
Attendance: 8,954
Referee: Roberto Rosetti (Italy)

30 November 2005
20:45

Slavia Prague (Czech Republic)	0–2	(France) Monaco
	Report	Maoulida 12', 72'

Stadion Evžena Rošického, Prague
Attendance: 8,452
Referee: Sorin Corpodean (Romania)
30 November 2005
20:45

CSKA Sofia (Bulgaria)	2–0	(Norway) Viking
Yanev 34' (pen.); Dah Zadi 46'	Report

Balgarska Armiya Stadium, Sofia
Attendance: 5,500
Referee: Costas Kapitanis (Cyprus)

15 December 2005
18:30

Monaco (France)	2–1	(Bulgaria) CSKA Sofia
Kapo 49'; Squillaci 74'	Report	Dimitrov 83'

Stade Louis II, Monaco
Attendance: 7,296
Referee: Dougie McDonald (Scotland)
15 December 2005
18:30

Hamburger SV (Germany)	2–0	(Czech Republic) Slavia Prague
Barbarez 9'; Mpenza 56'	Report

Volksparkstadion, Hamburg
Attendance: 46,253
Referee: Bernardino González Vázquez (Spain)

=== Group B ===
Pos	Team	Pld	W	D	L	GF	GA	GD	Pts	Qualification	PAL	ESP	LOK	BRØ	MPT
1	(Italy) Palermo	4	2	2	0	6	2	+4	8	Advance to knockout stage	—	—	0–0	3–0	—
2	(Spain) Espanyol	4	2	2	0	4	2	+2	8	Advance to knockout stage	1–1	—	—	—	1–0
3	(Russia) Lokomotiv Moscow	4	2	1	1	8	3	+5	7	Advance to knockout stage	—	0–1	—	4–2	—
4	(Denmark) Brøndby	4	1	1	2	5	8	−3	4		—	1–1	—	—	2–0
5	(Israel) Maccabi Petah Tikva	4	0	0	4	1	9	−8	0		1–2	—	0–4	—	—

19 October 2005
17:30

Lokomotiv Moscow (Russia)	0–1	(Spain) Espanyol
	Report	Tamudo 53'

Lokomotiv Stadium, Moscow
Attendance: 13,718
Referee: Jonas Eriksson (Sweden)
20 October 2005
16:00

Maccabi Petah Tikva (Israel)	1–2	(Italy) Palermo
Golan 45'	Report	Brienza 11'; Terlizzi 77'

Ramat Gan Stadium, Ramat Gan (Note: Maccabi Petah Tikva played their home matches at Ramat Gan Stadium in Tel Aviv District instead of their regular stadium, Municipal Stadium, Petah Tikva.)
Attendance: 3,964
Referee: Alexandru Tudor (Romania)

3 November 2005
20:45

Brøndby (Denmark)	2–0	(Israel) Maccabi Petah Tikva
Lantz 67'; Absalonsen 83'	Report

Brøndby Stadium, Brøndbyvester
Attendance: 14,188
Referee: Paulo Costa (Portugal)
3 November 2005
21:00

Palermo (Italy)	0–0	(Russia) Lokomotiv Moscow
	Report

Stadio Renzo Barbera, Palermo
Attendance: 15,833
Referee: Pascal Garibian (France)

23 November 2005
17:00

Lokomotiv Moscow (Russia)	4–2	(Denmark) Brøndby
Loskov 60', 64', 84'; Lebedenko 63'	Report	Retov 12'; Skoubo 28'

Lokomotiv Stadium, Moscow
Attendance: 8,700
Referee: Franz-Xaver Wack (Germany)
24 November 2005
21:15

Espanyol (Spain)	1–1	(Italy) Palermo
Moisés 90+1'	Report	Mariano 45'

Estadi Olímpic Lluís Companys, Barcelona
Attendance: 9,110
Referee: Stefan Messner (Austria)

30 November 2005
20:45

Brøndby (Denmark)	1–1	(Spain) Espanyol
Skoubo 65'	Report	Tamudo 42'

Brøndby Stadium, Brøndbyvester
Attendance: 21,399
Referee: Jan Wegereef (Netherlands)
30 November 2005
20:45

Maccabi Petah Tikva (Israel)	0–4	(Russia) Lokomotiv Moscow
	Report	Loskov 27'; Lebedenko 46', 47'; Ruopolo 52'

Ramat Gan Stadium, Ramat Gan
Attendance: 3,600
Referee: Viktor Kassai (Hungary)

15 December 2005
20:45

Espanyol (Spain)	1–0	(Israel) Maccabi Petah Tikva
Pochettino 83'	Report

Estadi Olímpic Lluís Companys, Barcelona
Attendance: 5,150
Referee: Anton Genov (Bulgaria)
15 December 2005
20:45

Palermo (Italy)	3–0	(Denmark) Brøndby
Makinwa 26'; Rinaudo 44', 88'	Report

Stadio Renzo Barbera, Palermo
Attendance: 4,521
Referee: Stuart Dougal (Scotland)

=== Group C ===
Pos	Team	Pld	W	D	L	GF	GA	GD	Pts	Qualification	STE	RCL	BSC	SAM	HBK
1	(Romania) Steaua București	4	2	2	0	7	0	+7	8	Advance to knockout stage	—	4–0	—	—	3–0
2	(France) Lens	4	2	1	1	7	5	+2	7	Advance to knockout stage	—	—	—	2–1	5–0
3	(Germany) Hertha BSC	4	1	3	0	1	0	+1	6	Advance to knockout stage	0–0	0–0	—	—	—
4	(Italy) Sampdoria	4	1	2	1	4	3	+1	5		0–0	—	0–0	—	—
5	(Sweden) Halmstads BK	4	0	0	4	1	12	−11	0		—	—	0–1	1–3	—

20 October 2005
16:15

Halmstads BK (Sweden)	0–1	(Germany) Hertha BSC
	Report	Neuendorf 67'

Ullevi, Gothenburg
Attendance: 2,136
Referee: Joeri Van De Velde (Belgium)
20 October 2005
19:00

Steaua București (Romania)	4–0	(France) Lens
Iacob 13'; Goian 16'; Dică 43', 63'	Report

Stadionul Steaua, Bucharest
Attendance: 19,500
Referee: Athanassios Briakos (Greece)

3 November 2005
20:35

Lens (France)	5–0	(Sweden) Halmstads BK
Cousin 16', 23', 47'; Jemâa 73'; Lachor 90'	Report

Stade Félix-Bollaert, Lens
Attendance: 16,189
Referee: Željko Širić (Croatia)
3 November 2005
20:45

Sampdoria (Italy)	0–0	(Romania) Steaua București
	Report

Stadio Luigi Ferraris, Genoa
Attendance: 17,104
Referee: Grzegorz Gilewski (Poland)

24 November 2005
19:00

Hertha BSC (Germany)	0–0	(France) Lens
	Report

Olympiastadion, Berlin
Attendance: 18,514
Referee: Howard Webb (England)
24 November 2005
19:00

Halmstads BK (Sweden)	1–3	(Italy) Sampdoria
Djurić 17'	Report	Volpi 31'; Diana 66'; Bonazzoli 86'

Ullevi, Gothenburg
Attendance: 3,126
Referee: Mark Halsey (England)

30 November 2005
20:45

Sampdoria (Italy)	0–0	(Germany) Hertha BSC
	Report

Stadio Luigi Ferraris, Genoa
Attendance: 16,507
Referee: Olegário Benquerença (Portugal)
30 November 2005
20:45

Steaua București (Romania)	3–0	(Sweden) Halmstads BK
Rădoi 9'; Goian 63'; Iacob 73'	Report

Stadionul Steaua, Bucharest
Attendance: 22,654
Referee: Emil Božinovski (Macedonia)

15 December 2005
20:45

Hertha BSC (Germany)	0–0	(Romania) Steaua București
	Report

Olympiastadion, Berlin
Attendance: 15,603
Referee: Pieter Vink (Netherlands)
15 December 2005
20:45

Lens (France)	2–1	(Italy) Sampdoria
Thomert 10'; Jemâa 90'	Report	Flachi 24'

Stade Félix-Bollaert, Lens
Attendance: 31,473
Referee: Tom Henning Øvrebø (Norway)

=== Group D ===
Pos	Team	Pld	W	D	L	GF	GA	GD	Pts	Qualification	MID	AZ	LIT	DNI	GRA
1	(England) Middlesbrough	4	3	1	0	6	0	+6	10	Advance to knockout stage	—	—	2–0	3–0	—
2	(Netherlands) AZ	4	3	1	0	5	1	+4	10	Advance to knockout stage	0–0	—	—	—	1–0
3	(Bulgaria) Litex Lovech	4	2	0	2	4	5	−1	6	Advance to knockout stage	—	0–2	—	—	2–1
4	(Ukraine) Dnipro Dnipropetrovsk	4	1	0	3	4	9	−5	3		—	1–2	0–2	—	—
5	(Switzerland) Grasshopper	4	0	0	4	3	7	−4	0		0–1	—	—	2–3	—

20 October 2005
20:00

Dnipro Dnipropetrovsk (Ukraine)	1–2	(Netherlands) AZ
Matyukhin 70'	Report	Arveladze 14'; Sektioui 52'

Stadium Meteor, Dnipropetrovsk
Attendance: 12,300
Referee: Tomasz Mikulski (Poland)
20 October 2005
21:00

Grasshopper (Switzerland)	0–1	(England) Middlesbrough
	Report	Hasselbaink 10'

Hardturm, Zürich
Attendance: 8,500
Referee: Espen Berntsen (Norway)

3 November 2005
16:00

Litex Lovech (Bulgaria)	2–1	(Switzerland) Grasshopper
Novaković 13'; Sandrinho 81'	Report	António 90'

Lovech Stadium, Lovech
Attendance: 4,175
Referee: Georgios Kasnaferis (Greece)
3 November 2005
21:00

Middlesbrough (England)	3–0	(Ukraine) Dnipro Dnipropetrovsk
Yakubu 36'; Viduka 50', 56'	Report

Riverside Stadium, Middlesbrough
Attendance: 12,953
Referee: Bertrand Layec (France)

24 November 2005
18:30

AZ (Netherlands)	0–0	(England) Middlesbrough
	Report

Alkmaarderhout, Alkmaar
Attendance: 8,465
Referee: Gianluca Paparesta (Italy)
24 November 2005
19:45

Dnipro Dnipropetrovsk (Ukraine)	0–2	(Bulgaria) Litex Lovech
	Report	Novaković 72'; Nazarenko 90+2' (o.g.)

Stadium Meteor, Dnipropetrovsk
Attendance: 3,000
Referee: Jouni Hyytiä (Finland)

30 November 2005
20:45

Litex Lovech (Bulgaria)	0–2	(Netherlands) AZ
	Report	Van Galen 10'; Sektioui 83'

Lovech Stadium, Lovech
Attendance: 4,601
Referee: Bernhard Brugger (Austria)
30 November 2005
20:45

Grasshopper (Switzerland)	2–3	(Ukraine) Dnipro Dnipropetrovsk
Touré 85'; Renggli 90'	Report	Nazarenko 39'; Kravchenko 61'; Mykhaylenko 84'

Hardturm, Zürich
Attendance: 1,800
Referee: Edo Trivković (Croatia)

15 December 2005
20:45

AZ (Netherlands)	1–0	(Switzerland) Grasshopper
Koevermans 70'	Report

Alkmaarderhout, Alkmaar
Attendance: 8,153
Referee: Hervé Piccirillo (France)
15 December 2005
20:45

Middlesbrough (England)	2–0	(Bulgaria) Litex Lovech
Maccarone 79', 86'	Report

Riverside Stadium, Middlesbrough
Attendance: 9,436
Referee: Serge Gumienny (Belgium)

=== Group E ===
Pos	Team	Pld	W	D	L	GF	GA	GD	Pts	Qualification	STR	ROM	BSL	RSB	TRO
1	(France) Strasbourg	4	2	2	0	7	3	+4	8	Advance to knockout stage	—	—	—	2–2	2–0
2	(Italy) Roma	4	2	1	1	7	6	+1	7	Advance to knockout stage	1–1	—	3–1	—	—
3	(Switzerland) Basel	4	2	0	2	7	9	−2	6	Advance to knockout stage	0–2	—	—	—	4–3
4	(Serbia and Montenegro) Red Star Belgrade	4	1	1	2	7	8	−1	4		—	3–1	1–2	—	—
5	(Norway) Tromsø	4	1	0	3	7	9	−2	3		—	1–2	—	3–1	—

20 October 2005
19:30

Basel (Switzerland)	0–2	(France) Strasbourg
	Report	Diané 15'; Boka 25'

St. Jakob-Park, Basel
Attendance: 16,623
Referee: Mark Halsey (England)
20 October 2005
20:45

Tromsø (Norway)	1–2	(Italy) Roma
Årst 42'	Report	Kuffour 35'; Cufré 84'

Alfheim Stadion, Tromsø
Attendance: 5,982
Referee: Peter Sippel (Germany)

3 November 2005
17:00

Red Star Belgrade (Serbia and Montenegro)	1–2	(Switzerland) Basel
Purović 25'	Report	Delgado 30' (pen.); Rossi 88'

Stadion FK Crvena zvezda, Belgrade
Attendance: 0 (Note: The match was played behind closed doors.)
Referee: Knud Erik Fisker (Denmark)
3 November 2005
20:45

Strasbourg (France)	2–0	(Norway) Tromsø
Pagis 38'; Arrache 66'	Report

Stade de la Meinau, Strasbourg
Attendance: 8,516
Referee: Levan Paniashvili (Bulgaria)

24 November 2005
20:00

Tromsø (Norway)	3–1	(Serbia and Montenegro) Red Star Belgrade
Kibebe 22'; Årst 37', 74' (pen.)	Report	Žigić 24'

Alfheim Stadion, Tromsø
Attendance: 4,289
Referee: Dick van Egmond (Netherlands)
24 November 2005
21:00

Roma (Italy)	1–1	(France) Strasbourg
Cassano 72'	Report	Bellaïd 51'

Stadio Olimpico, Rome
Attendance: 8,109
Referee: Alberto Undiano Mallenco (Spain)

1 December 2005
20:45

Red Star Belgrade (Serbia and Montenegro)	3–1	(Italy) Roma
Žigić 37', 86'; Purović 77'	Report	Nonda 23'

Stadion FK Crvena zvezda, Belgrade
Attendance: 35,186
Referee: Martin Hansson (Sweden)
1 December 2005
20:45

Basel (Switzerland)	4–3	(Norway) Tromsø
Petrić 17'; Delgado 61'; Chipperfield 67'; Degen 75'	Report	Strand 2', 29'; Årst 19'

St. Jakob-Park, Basel
Attendance: 14,887
Referee: Krzysztof Slupik (Poland)

14 December 2005
20:45

Roma (Italy)	3–1	(Switzerland) Basel
Taddei 12'; Totti 45'; Nonda 49'	Report	Petrić 78'

Stadio Olimpico, Rome
Attendance: 14,813
Referee: Helmut Fleischer (Germany)
14 December 2005
20:45

Strasbourg (France)	2–2	(Serbia and Montenegro) Red Star Belgrade
Gameiro 78', 90+4'	Report	Basta 34'; Đokaj 63'

Stade de la Meinau, Strasbourg
Attendance: 13,416
Referee: Stefan Messner (Austria)

=== Group F ===
Pos	Team	Pld	W	D	L	GF	GA	GD	Pts	Qualification	OM	LS	HVN	CSM	DB
1	(France) Marseille	4	3	0	1	5	3	+2	9	Advance to knockout stage	—	—	1–0	—	2–1
2	(Bulgaria) Levski Sofia	4	2	0	2	4	4	0	6	Advance to knockout stage	1–0	—	—	—	1–0
3	(Netherlands) Heerenveen	4	1	2	1	2	2	0	5	Advance to knockout stage	—	2–1	—	0–0	—
4	(Russia) CSKA Moscow	4	1	1	2	3	4	−1	4		1–2	2–1	—	—	—
5	(Romania) Dinamo București	4	1	1	2	2	3	−1	4		—	—	0–0	1–0	—

20 October 2005
17:30

CSKA Moscow (Russia)	1–2	(France) Marseille
Vágner Love 80'	Report	Lamouchi 23'; Niang 38'

Dynamo Stadium, Moscow
Attendance: 12,500
Referee: Kristinn Jakobsson (Iceland)
20 October 2005
20:45

Dinamo București (Romania)	0–0	(Netherlands) Heerenveen
	Report

Stadionul Dinamo, Bucharest
Attendance: 11,890
Referee: Jacek Granat (Poland)

3 November 2005
18:00

Levski Sofia (Bulgaria)	1–0	(Romania) Dinamo București
E. Angelov 90'	Report

Georgi Asparuhov Stadium, Sofia
Attendance: 17,322
Referee: Nikolai Ivanov (Russia)
3 November 2005
20:30

Heerenveen (Netherlands)	0–0	(Russia) CSKA Moscow
	Report

Abe Lenstra Stadion, Heerenveen
Attendance: 20,200
Referee: Martin Ingvarsson (Sweden)

24 November 2005
16:30

CSKA Moscow (Russia)	2–1	(Bulgaria) Levski Sofia
Vágner Love 49', 73'	Report	Domovchiyski 90'

Dynamo Stadium, Moscow
Attendance: 5,900
Referee: Kenny Clark (Scotland)
24 November 2005
20:45

Marseille (France)	1–0	(Netherlands) Heerenveen
Taiwo 88' (pen.)	Report

Stade Vélodrome, Marseille
Attendance: 11,777
Referee: João Ferreira (Portugal)

1 December 2005
18:30

Levski Sofia (Bulgaria)	1–0	(France) Marseille
Yovov 54'	Report

Georgi Asparuhov Stadium, Sofia
Attendance: 16,616
Referee: Nicolai Vollquartz (Denmark)
1 December 2005
18:30

Dinamo București (Romania)	1–0	(Russia) CSKA Moscow
Munteanu 73'	Report

Stadionul Dinamo, Bucharest
Attendance: 7,000
Referee: Fritz Stuchlik (Austria)

14 December 2005
20:45

Marseille (France)	2–1	(Romania) Dinamo București
Cesar 38'; Delfim 45'	Report	Niculescu 51'

Stade Vélodrome, Marseille
Attendance: 15,909
Referee: Julián Rodríguez Santiago (Spain)
14 December 2005
20:45

Heerenveen (Netherlands)	2–1	(Bulgaria) Levski Sofia
Samaras 55'; Hanssen 90'	Report	Ivanov 53'

Abe Lenstra Stadion, Heerenveen
Attendance: 20,025
Referee: Zsolt Szabo (Hungary)

=== Group G ===
Pos	Team	Pld	W	D	L	GF	GA	GD	Pts	Qualification	RAP	SHK	STU	PAOK	REN
1	(Romania) Rapid București	4	3	0	1	5	2	+3	9	Advance to knockout stage	—	—	—	1–0	2–0
2	(Ukraine) Shakhtar Donetsk	4	3	0	1	4	1	+3	9	Advance to knockout stage	0–1	—	—	1–0	—
3	(Germany) VfB Stuttgart	4	3	0	1	6	4	+2	9	Advance to knockout stage	2–1	0–2	—	—	—
4	(Greece) PAOK	4	1	0	3	6	5	+1	3		—	—	1–2	—	5–1
5	(France) Rennes	4	0	0	4	1	10	−9	0		—	0–1	0–2	—	—

20 October 2005
18:00

Shakhtar Donetsk (Ukraine)	1–0	(Greece) PAOK
Brandão 68' (pen.)	Report

RSC Olimpiyskiy, Donetsk
Attendance: 24,650
Referee: Alan Kelly (Republic of Ireland)
20 October 2005
18:15

Rennes (France)	0–2	(Germany) VfB Stuttgart
	Report	Tomasson 87'; Ljuboja 90' (pen.)

Stade de la Route de Lorient, Rennes
Attendance: 22,847
Referee: Mike Dean (England)

3 November 2005
19:00

Rapid București (Romania)	2–0	(France) Rennes
Niculae 42'; Buga 67'	Report

Stadionul Giuleşti-Valentin Stănescu, Bucharest
Attendance: 7,120
Referee: Tony Asumaa (Finland)
3 November 2005
20:45

VfB Stuttgart (Germany)	0–2	(Ukraine) Shakhtar Donetsk
	Report	Fernandinho 31'; Marica 88'

Gottlieb-Daimler-Stadion, Stuttgart
Attendance: 15,704
Referee: Tommy Skjerven (Norway)

24 November 2005
17:00

PAOK (Greece)	1–2	(Germany) VfB Stuttgart
Karipidis 48'	Report	Ljuboja 85', 90+1' (pen.)

Toumba Stadium, Thessaloniki
Attendance: 21,479
Referee: Carlos Megía Dávila (Spain)
24 November 2005
18:30

Shakhtar Donetsk (Ukraine)	0–1	(Romania) Rapid București
	Report	Măldărăşanu 87'

RSC Olimpiyskiy, Donetsk
Attendance: 17,728
Referee: Ceri Richards (Wales)

1 December 2005
20:45

Rapid București (Romania)	1–0	(Greece) PAOK
Măldărăşanu 45+2'	Report

Stadionul Giuleşti-Valentin Stănescu, Bucharest
Attendance: 12,100
Referee: Markus Nobs (Switzerland)
1 December 2005
20:45

Rennes (France)	0–1	(Ukraine) Shakhtar Donetsk
	Report	Elano 38' (pen.)

Stade de la Route de Lorient, Rennes
Attendance: 18,727
Referee: Selçuk Dereli (Turkey)

14 December 2005
20:45

PAOK (Greece)	5–1	(France) Rennes
Rochat 3' (o.g.); Christodoulopoulos 38'; Yiasoumi 79', 89'; Salpingidis 83'	Report	Briand 70'

Toumba Stadium, Thessaloniki
Attendance: 1,012
Referee: Antonio Costa (Portugal)
14 December 2005
20:45

VfB Stuttgart (Germany)	2–1	(Romania) Rapid București
Gómez 20', 37'	Report	Burdujan 80'

Gottlieb-Daimler-Stadion, Stuttgart
Attendance: 14,000
Referee: Domenico Messina (Italy)

=== Group H ===
Pos	Team	Pld	W	D	L	GF	GA	GD	Pts	Qualification	SEV	ZEN	BOL	BJK	VIT
1	(Spain) Sevilla	4	2	1	1	8	4	+4	7	Advance to knockout stage	—	—	—	3–0	3–1
2	(Russia) Zenit Saint Petersburg	4	2	1	1	5	4	+1	7	Advance to knockout stage	2–1	—	—	—	2–1
3	(England) Bolton Wanderers	4	1	3	0	4	3	+1	6	Advance to knockout stage	1–1	1–0	—	—	—
4	(Turkey) Beşiktaş	4	1	2	1	5	6	−1	5		—	1–1	1–1	—	—
5	(Portugal) Vitória de Guimarães	4	0	1	3	4	9	−5	1		—	—	1–1	1–3	—

20 October 2005
18:00

Zenit Saint Petersburg (Russia)	2–1	(Portugal) Vitória de Guimarães
Spivak 39' (pen.); Arshavin 54'	Report	Neca 59'

Petrovsky Stadium, Saint Petersburg
Attendance: 18,300
Referee: Dejan Delević (Serbia and Montenegro)
20 October 2005
20:45

Beşiktaş (Turkey)	1–1	(England) Bolton Wanderers
Aílton 7'	Report	Borgetti 29'

BJK İnönü Stadium, Istanbul
Attendance: 17,073
Referee: Ruud Bossen (Netherlands)

3 November 2005
21:00

Bolton Wanderers (England)	1–0	(Russia) Zenit Saint Petersburg
Nolan 24'	Report

Reebok Stadium, Horwich
Attendance: 15,905
Referee: Matteo Trefoloni (Italy)
3 November 2005
21:30

Sevilla (Spain)	3–0	(Turkey) Beşiktaş
Saviola 64'; Kanouté 65', 89'	Report

Estadio Ramón Sánchez Pizjuán, Sevilla
Attendance: 27,862
Referee: Johan Verbist (Belgium)

24 November 2005
18:30

Zenit Saint Petersburg (Russia)	2–1	(Spain) Sevilla
Kerzhakov 11', 88'	Report	Saviola 90+3' (pen.)

Petrovsky Stadium, Saint Petersburg
Attendance: 12,500
Referee: Philippe Leuba (Switzerland)
24 November 2005
21:00

Vitória de Guimarães (Portugal)	1–1	(England) Bolton Wanderers
Saganowski 84'	Report	Vaz Tê 87'

Estádio D. Afonso Henriques, Guimarães
Attendance: 10,230
Referee: Laurent Duhamel (France)

1 December 2005
20:45

Sevilla (Spain)	3–1	(Portugal) Vitória de Guimarães
Saviola 10', 28'; Adriano 39'	Report	Benachour 44'

Estadio Ramón Sánchez Pizjuán, Sevilla
Attendance: 30,306
Referee: Paolo Bertini (Italy)
1 December 2005
20:45

Beşiktaş (Turkey)	1–1	(Russia) Zenit Saint Petersburg
Akın 23'	Report	Gorshkov 29'

BJK İnönü Stadium, Istanbul
Attendance: 16,640
Referee: Knut Kircher (Germany)

14 December 2005
20:45

Vitória de Guimarães (Portugal)	1–3	(Turkey) Beşiktaş
Saganowski 11'	Report	Toraman 7', 60'; Youla 17'

Estádio D. Afonso Henriques, Guimarães
Attendance: 4,203
Referee: Cristian Balaj (Romania)
14 December 2005
20:45

Bolton Wanderers (England)	1–1	(Spain) Sevilla
Ngotty 66'	Report	Adriano 74'

Reebok Stadium, Horwich
Attendance: 15,623
Referee: Michael Weiner (Germany)
