= 2005–06 UEFA Cup =

35th season of Europe's secondary club football tournament organised by UEFA

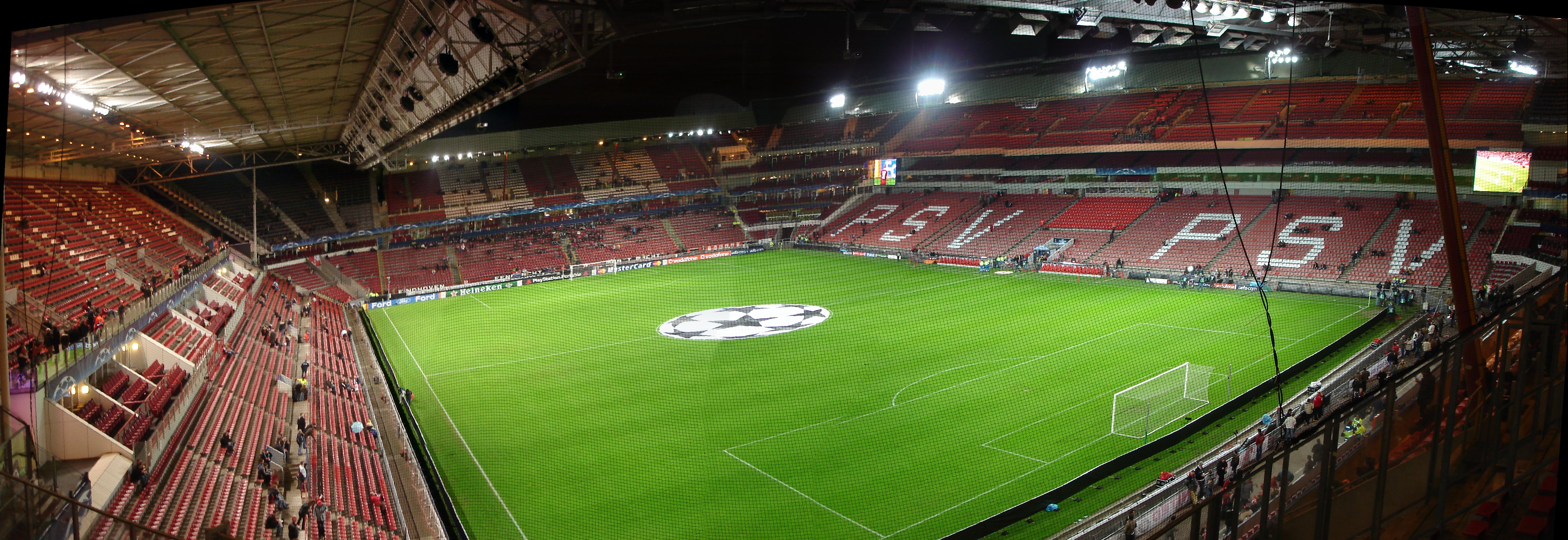
- Philips Stadion in Eindhoven hosted the final.

Tournament details
- Dates: 12 July 2005 – 10 May 2006
- Teams: 80 (competition proper); 144 (qualifying)

Final positions
- Champions: (Spain) Sevilla (1st title)
- Runners-up: (England) Middlesbrough

Tournament statistics
- Matches played: 221
- Goals scored: 526 (2.38 per match)
- Attendance: 3,489,789 (15,791 per match)
- Top scorer(s): Matías Delgado (Basel); 7 goals

The 2005–06 UEFA Cup, the 35th edition of the UEFA Cup, was won by Sevilla, beating Middlesbrough in the final. It was the first victory for Sevilla in a European competition, and the first appearance by Middlesbrough in a European final. The final took place at Philips Stadion, in Eindhoven, Netherlands. The match was refereed by Herbert Fandel. Middlesbrough sealed their place in the final on the back of two dramatic comebacks. In the quarter-finals they beat FC Basel of Switzerland 4–3 on aggregate (after losing the first leg 2–0 and being 1–0 down in the second leg, they scored 4 goals), this put them into the semi-final to face Steaua București. The first leg finished 1–0 to Steaua, and the second leg (at the Riverside Stadium again) finished 4–2 (after being 2–0 down). Sevilla went on to defend the trophy the following year.

CSKA Moscow were the defending champions, but were eliminated in the group stage.

== Association team allocation ==
113 teams qualified directly for the 2005–06 UEFA Cup from 52 UEFA associations. An additional three teams qualified via the UEFA Fair Play league, while 27 further teams qualified at various stages from the UEFA Intertoto Cup and the UEFA Champions League.

Below is the final qualification scheme for the 2005–06 UEFA Cup:

- Associations 1–6 each have 3 teams qualify, with the exception of England (2) who have 2 teams
- Associations 7–8 each have 4 teams qualify
- Associations 9–15 each have 2 teams qualify
- Associations 16–20 each have 3 teams qualify
- Associations 21–49 each have 2 teams qualify, with the exception of Liechtenstein (43) who have 1 team
- Associations 50–52 each have 1 team qualify

plus

- Winner of previous years' tournament
- 3 UEFA Fair Play entries
- 3 winners of the 2005 UEFA Intertoto Cup
- 16 losers from the UEFA Champions League third qualifying round
- 8 third-placed teams from the UEFA Champions League group stage

=== Association ranking ===
Rank	Association	Coeff.	Teams	Notes
1	Spain	79.851	3	+1(UCL)
2	England	62.153	3	−1(CLTH) +1(UCL)
3	Italy	59.186	3	+1(UCL)
4	Germany	49.489	3	+1(UCL) +2(UIC) +1(FP)
5	France	48.326	3	+3(UCL) +1(UIC)
6	Portugal	42.333	3	
7	Greece	34.748	4	
8	Netherlands	34.081	4	
9	Czech Republic	33.075	2	+1(UCL)
10	Turkey	32.291	2	
11	Scotland	32.125	2	
12	Belgium	28.875	2	+1(UCL)
13	Switzerland	22.375	2	+2(UCL)
14	Ukraine	22.125	2	+1(UCL)
15	Norway	21.900	2	+2(UCL) +1(FP)

Rank	Association	Coeff.	Teams	Notes
16	Poland	21.750	3	+1(UCL)
17	Israel	21.249	3	
18	Austria	21.125	3	
19	Serbia and Montenegro	20.165	3	+1(UCL)
20	Bulgaria	19.998	3	+1(UCL)
21	Russia	19.916	2	+1(UCL)
22	Denmark	17.450	2	+1(UCL) +1(FP)
23	Croatia	17.375	2	
24	Sweden	16.716	2	+1(UCL)
25	Hungary	15.290	2	+1(UCL)
26	Romania	14.790	2	+1(UCL)
27	Slovakia	12.832	2	+1(UCL)
28	Slovenia	9.165	2	
29	Cyprus	8.998	2	+1(UCL)
30	Moldova	6.832	2	
31	Latvia	5.998	2	
32	Finland	5.874	2	
33	Bosnia and Herzegovina	5.499	2	

Rank	Association	Coeff.	Teams	Notes
34	Georgia	4.999	2	
35	Macedonia	4.830	2	
36	Lithuania	4.165	2	
37	Belarus	3.582	2	
38	Iceland	3.332	2	
39	Malta	3.331	2	
40	Republic of Ireland	3.164	2	
41	Armenia	2.831	2	
42	Wales	2.332	2	
43	Liechtenstein	2.000	1	
44	Albania	1.831	2	
45	Northern Ireland	1.665	2	
46	Estonia	1.665	2	
47	Luxembourg	1.498	2	
48	Azerbaijan	1.165	2	
49	Faroe Islands	0.832	2	
50	Kazakhstan	0.666	0	
51	San Marino	0.000	1	
52	Andorra	0.000	1	

Notes

- (CLTH): Berth vacated due to being taken by the UEFA Champions League title holders.
- (UCL): Teams transferred from the Champions League.
- (UIC): Additional berths for the 2005 UEFA Intertoto Cup winners.
- (FP): Additional Fair Play berth (Germany, Norway, Denmark).

=== Distribution ===
Each association enters a certain number of teams to the UEFA Cup based on its league coefficient. Through domestic competitions (national championships and cups and league cups in certain countries) an association may qualify up to four teams. The following amendments were made to the 2005–06 qualification scheme:

- The defending UEFA Cup holder CSKA Moscow already qualified for the 2nd qualifying round, which means that the first UEFA Cup entrant of the 25th and 26th associations on the ranking list (Hungary and Romania) will gain direct access to the second qualifying round of the UEFA Cup.
- Because Liverpool entered the first qualifying round of the Champions League as title holders, the first UEFA Cup entrant of 11th and 12th associations on the ranking list (Scotland and Belgium) will gain direct access to the first round of the UEFA Cup.
- In Kazakhstan, only Kairat obtained a UEFA licence for the 2005–06 season. The other teams from Kazakhstan were not allowed to compete. Therefore, the first UEFA Cup entrant of the 27th and 28th countries on the ranking list (Slovakia and Slovenia) will gain direct access to the second qualifying round of the UEFA Cup.
- In Serbia and Montenegro, the cup winner Železnik was replaced by OFK Beograd because they did not obtain a UEFA licence.
- In Bosnia and Herzegovina, the cup winner Sarajevo was replaced by Široki Brijeg, and 2nd in the league Zeljeznicar was replaced by Žepče, because they did not obtain a UEFA licence.

	Teams entering in this round	Teams advancing from previous round	Teams transferred from Champions League	Teams transferred from Intertoto Cup
First qualifying round (50 teams)	2 league winners from associations 51 and 52; 21 cup winners from associations 29–49; 24 runners-up from associations 25–42 and 44-49; 3 entries through UEFA Fair Play			
Second qualifying round (62 teams)	17 cup winners from associations 13–28; 9 runners-up from associations 16–24; 11 third-place finishers from associations 9–20	25 winners from the first qualifying round		
First round (80 teams)	12 national cup winners from associations 1–12; 2 third-place finishers from associations 7–8; 5 fourth-place finishers from associations 4–8; 7 fifth-place finishers from associations 1 and 3–8; 2 sixth-place finishers from associations 1 and 3; 1 League Cup winners from association 2; 1 current UEFA Cup holder	31 winners from the second qualifying round	16 losers from the UEFA Champions League third qualifying round	3 winners of the 2005 UEFA Intertoto Cup
Group stage (40 teams)		40 winners from the First Round		
Knockout phase (32 teams)		24 top-three finishers from the group stage	8 entries from UEFA Champions League group stage	

=== Teams ===
The labels in the parentheses show how each team qualified for the place of its starting round:

- TH: Title holders
- CW: Cup winners
- CR: Cup runners-up
- LC: League Cup winners
- Nth: League position
- PO: End-of-season European competition play-offs (winners or position)
- IC: Intertoto Cup
- FP: Fair play
- CL: Relegated from the Champions League
  - GS: Third-placed teams from the group stage
  - Q3: Losers from the third qualifying round

Round of 32
(Spain) Real Betis (CL GS)	(Germany) Schalke 04 (CL GS)	(Belgium) Club Brugge (CL GS)	(Norway) Rosenborg (CL GS)
(Italy) Udinese (CL GS)	(France) Lille (CL GS)	(Switzerland) Thun (CL GS)	(Slovakia) Artmedia Bratislava (CL GS)
First round
(Russia) CSKA Moscow ^{TH} (CW)	(France) Rennes (4th)	(Netherlands) Willem II (CR)	(Poland) Wisła Kraków (CL Q3)
(Spain) Espanyol (5th)	(France) Strasbourg (LC)	(Czech Republic) Baník Ostrava (CW)	(Serbia and Montenegro) Partizan (CL Q3)
(Spain) Sevilla (6th)	(Portugal) Vitória de Setúbal (CW)	(Turkey) Galatasaray (CW)	(Bulgaria) CSKA Sofia (CL Q3)
(Spain) Osasuna (CR)	(Portugal) Braga (4th)	(Scotland) Hibernian (3rd)	(Russia) Lokomotiv Moscow (CL Q3)
(England) Bolton Wanderers (6th)	(Portugal) Vitória de Guimarães (5th)	(Belgium) Germinal Beerschot (CW)	(Denmark) Brøndby (CL Q3)
(England) Middlesbrough (7th)	(Greece) AEK Athens (3rd)	(England) Everton (CL Q3)	(Sweden) Malmö FF (CL Q3)
(Italy) Sampdoria (5th)	(Greece) Skoda Xanthi (4th)	(France) Monaco (CL Q3)	(Hungary) Debrecen (CL Q3)
(Italy) Palermo (6th)	(Greece) PAOK (5th)	(Portugal) Sporting CP (CL Q3)	(Romania) Steaua București (CL Q3)
(Italy) Roma (CR)	(Greece) Aris (CR)	(Czech Republic) Slavia Prague (CL Q3)	(Cyprus) Anorthosis Famagusta (CL Q3)
(Germany) Hertha BSC (4th)	(Netherlands) AZ (3rd)	(Switzerland) Basel (CL Q3)	(Germany) Hamburger SV (IC)
(Germany) VfB Stuttgart (5th)	(Netherlands) Feyenoord (4th)	(Ukraine) Shakhtar Donetsk (CL Q3)	(France) Marseille (IC)
(Germany) Bayer Leverkusen (6th)	(Netherlands) Heerenveen (5th)	(Norway) Vålerenga (CL Q3)	(France) Lens (IC)
(France) Auxerre (CW)			
Second qualifying round
(Czech Republic) Teplice (3rd)	(Poland) Groclin Grodzisk Wielkopolski (CW)	(Serbia and Montenegro) Red Star Belgrade (2nd)	(Denmark) Midtjylland (3rd)
(Turkey) Beşiktaş (4th)	(Poland) Legia Warsaw (3rd)	(Serbia and Montenegro) Zeta (3rd)	(Croatia) Rijeka (CW)
(Scotland) Dundee United (CR)	(Poland) Wisła Płock (4th)	(Serbia and Montenegro) OFK Beograd (4th)	(Croatia) Inter Zaprešić (2nd)
(Belgium) Genk (3rd)	(Israel) Maccabi Tel Aviv (CW)	(Bulgaria) Levski Sofia (CW)	(Sweden) Djurgårdens IF (CW)
(Switzerland) Zürich (CW)	(Israel) Maccabi Petah Tikva (2nd)	(Bulgaria) Lokomotiv Plovdiv (3rd)	(Sweden) Halmstads BK (2nd)
(Switzerland) Grasshopper (3rd)	(Israel) Ashdod (3rd)	(Bulgaria) Litex Lovech (4th)	(Hungary) Sopron (CW)
(Ukraine) Metalurh Donetsk (3rd)	Austria Wien (CW)	(Russia) Krylia Sovetov Samara (3rd)	(Romania) Dinamo București (CW)
(Ukraine) Dnipro Dnipropetrovsk (4th)	(Austria) GAK (2nd)	(Russia) Zenit Saint Petersburg (4th)	(Slovakia) Dukla Banská Bystrica (CW)
(Norway) Brann (CW)	(Austria) Superfund (4th)	(Denmark) Copenhagen (2nd)	(Slovenia) Publikum (CW)
(Norway) Tromsø (4th)			
First qualifying round
(Hungary) Ferencváros (2nd)	(Bosnia and Herzegovina) Žepče (12th)	(Republic of Ireland) Longford Town (CW)	(Estonia) Flora (3rd)
(Romania) Rapid București (3rd)	(Georgia (country)) Locomotive Tbilisi (CW)	(Republic of Ireland) Cork City (2nd)	(Luxembourg) Pétange (CW)
(Slovakia) Žilina (2nd)	(Georgia (country)) Torpedo Kutaisi (2nd)	(Armenia) Mika (CW)	(Luxembourg) Etzella Ettelbruck (2nd)
(Slovenia) Domžale (2nd)	(North Macedonia) Bashkimi (CW)	(Armenia) Banants (3rd)	(Azerbaijan) Baku (CW)
(Cyprus) Omonia (CW)	(North Macedonia) Vardar (2nd)	(Wales) Carmarthen Town (CW)	(Azerbaijan) Khazar Lankaran (2nd)
(Cyprus) APOEL (2nd)	(Lithuania) Ekranas (2nd)	(Wales) Rhyl (2nd)	(Faroe Islands) B36 (2nd)
(Moldova) Nistru Otaci (CW)	(Lithuania) Atlantas (3rd)	(Liechtenstein) Vaduz (CW)	(Faroe Islands) NSÍ (CR)
(Moldova) Dacia Chișinău (3rd)	(Belarus) MTZ-RIPO Minsk (CW)	(Albania) Teuta (CW)	(Andorra) Sant Julià (1st)
(Latvia) Ventspils (CW)	(Belarus) BATE Borisov (2nd)	(Albania) Elbasani (2nd)	(San Marino) Domagnano (1st)
(Latvia) Liepājas Metalurgs (2nd)	(Iceland) Keflavík (CW)	(Northern Ireland) Portadown (CW)	(Norway) Viking (FP)
(Finland) MYPA (CW)	(Iceland) ÍBV (2nd)	(Northern Ireland) Linfield (2nd)	(Germany) Mainz 05 (FP)
(Finland) Allianssi (2nd)	(Malta) Birkirkara (CW)	(Estonia) TVMK (2nd)	(Denmark) Esbjerg (FP)
(Bosnia and Herzegovina) Široki Brijeg (3rd)	(Malta) Hibernians (3rd)		

Notes

1. Serbia and Montenegro (SCG): 2004–05 Serbia and Montenegro Cup winners Železnik failed to obtain UEFA licence and was replaced by league 4th-placed club OFK Beograd, as Cup runners-up Red Star Belgrade already qualified to UEFA Cup through league position.
2. Bosnia and Herzegovina (BIH): 2004–05 Bosnia and Herzegovina Football Cup winners Sarajevo and league runners-up Željezničar failed to obtain UEFA licences and were replaced by two highest-placed teams that obtained them — Široki Brijeg (Cup runners-up and league 3rd-placed team) and Žepče (12th-placed team).
3. Kazakhstan (KAZ): 2004 Kazakhstan Cup winners Taraz and league runners-up Irtysh failed to obtain UEFA licences. Since no other team was able to obtain a licence as well, Kazakhstan was not represented in UEFA Cup.

== Round and draw dates ==
The schedule of the competition was as follows (all draws were held at the UEFA headquarters in Nyon, Switzerland, unless stated otherwise).

Schedule for 2005–06 UEFA Cup
Phase	Round	Draw date	First leg	Second leg
Qualifying	First qualifying round	24 June 2005	14 July 2005	28 July 2005
Qualifying	Second qualifying round	29 July 2005	11 August 2005	25 August 2005
First round		26 August 2005 (Monaco)	15 September 2005	29 September 2005
Group stage	Matchday 1	4 October 2005	20 October 2005	
Group stage	Matchday 2	4 October 2005	3 November 2005	
Group stage	Matchday 3	4 October 2005	24 November 2005	
Group stage	Matchday 4	4 October 2005	30 November – 1 December 2005	
Group stage	Matchday 5	4 October 2005	14–15 December 2005	
Knockout stage	Round of 32	16 December 2005	15–16 February 2006	23 February 2006
Knockout stage	Round of 16	16 December 2005	9 March 2006	15–16 March 2006
Knockout stage	Quarter-finals	17 March 2006	30 March 2006	6 April 2006
Knockout stage	Semi-finals	17 March 2006	20 April 2006	27 April 2006
Knockout stage	Final	17 March 2006	10 May 2006 at Philips Stadion, Eindhoven	

== Qualifying rounds ==
=== First qualifying round ===
Team 1	Agg.	Team 2	1st leg	2nd leg
Southern–Mediterranean region
Bashkimi (North Macedonia)	4–1	(Bosnia and Herzegovina) Žepče	3–0 (Note: The Baskimi v Žepče first leg match was awarded 3–0 to Baskimi.)	1–1
Birkirkara (Malta)	0–6	(Cyprus) APOEL	0–2	0–4
Sant Julià (Andorra)	0–10	(Romania) Rapid București	0–5	0–5
Teuta (Albania)	3–4	(Bosnia and Herzegovina) Široki Brijeg	3–1	0–3
Elbasani (Albania)	1–1 (a)	(North Macedonia) Vardar	1–1	0–0
Omonia (Cyprus)	6–0	(Malta) Hibernians	3–0	3–0
Domagnano (San Marino)	0–8	(Slovenia) Domžale	0–5	0–3
Central–East region
Ferencváros (Hungary)	2–3	(Belarus) MTZ-RIPO Minsk	0–2	2–1
Banants (Armenia)	4–3	(Georgia (country)) Locomotive Tbilisi	2–3	2–0
Torpedo Kutaisi (Georgia (country))	0–6	(Belarus) BATE Borisov	0–1	0–5
Vaduz (Liechtenstein)	2–1	(Moldova) Dacia Chișinău	2–0	0–1
Baku (Azerbaijan)	2–3	(Slovakia) Žilina	1–0	1–3
Mainz 05 (Germany)	4–0	(Armenia) Mika	4–0	0–0
Nistru Otaci (Moldova)	5–2	(Azerbaijan) Khazar Lankaran	3–1	2–1
Northern region
Longford Town (Republic of Ireland)	3–5	(Wales) Carmarthen Town	2–0	1–5
Ekranas (Lithuania)	1–2	(Republic of Ireland) Cork City	0–2	1–0
ÍBV (Iceland)	2–3	(Faroe Islands) B36	1–1	1–2
Allianssi (Finland)	4–1	(Luxembourg) Pétange	3–0	1–1
Linfield (Northern Ireland)	2–2 (a)	(Latvia) Ventspils	1–0	1–2
NSÍ (Faroe Islands)	0–6	(Latvia) Liepājas Metalurgs	0–3	0–3
Etzella Ettelbruck (Luxembourg)	0–6	(Iceland) Keflavík	0–4	0–2
Portadown (Northern Ireland)	1–3	(Norway) Viking	1–2	0–1
TVMK (Estonia)	1–2	(Finland) MYPA	1–1	0–1
Rhyl (Wales)	4–4 (a)	(Lithuania) Atlantas	2–1	2–3
Esbjerg (Denmark)	7–2	(Estonia) Flora	1–2	6–0

=== Second qualifying round ===
Team 1	Agg.	Team 2	1st leg	2nd leg
Southern–Mediterranean region
Inter Zaprešić (Croatia)	1–7	(Serbia and Montenegro) Red Star Belgrade	1–3	0–4
Bashkimi (North Macedonia)	0–11	(Israel) Maccabi Petah Tikva	0–5	0–6
Dinamo București (Romania)	4–3	(Cyprus) Omonia	3–1	1–2
OFK Beograd (Serbia and Montenegro)	2–2 (a)	(Bulgaria) Lokomotiv Plovdiv	2–1	0–1
APOEL (Cyprus)	3–2	(Israel) Maccabi Tel Aviv	1–0	2–2 (a.e.t.)
Litex Lovech (Bulgaria)	2–2 (a)	(Croatia) Rijeka	1–0	1–2
Vaduz (Liechtenstein)	1–6	(Turkey) Beşiktaş	0–1	1–5
Rapid București (Romania)	4–1	(North Macedonia) Vardar	3–0	1–1
Publikum (Slovenia)	1–3	(Bulgaria) Levski Sofia	1–0	0–3
Zeta (Serbia and Montenegro)	2–5	(Bosnia and Herzegovina) Široki Brijeg	0–1	2–4
Ashdod (Israel)	3–3 (a)	(Slovenia) Domžale	2–2	1–1
Central–East region
Krylia Sovetov Samara (Russia)	4–0	(Belarus) BATE Borisov	2–0	2–0
Sopron (Hungary)	1–5	(Ukraine) Metalurh Donetsk	0–3	1–2
Grasshopper (Switzerland)	3–3 (a)	(Poland) Wisła Płock	1–0	2–3
Nistru Otaci (Moldova)	0–3	(Austria) GAK	0–2	0–1
Žilina (Slovakia)	3–4	Austria Wien	1–2	2–2
Superfund (Austria)	3–3 (a)	(Russia) Zenit Saint Petersburg	2–2	1–1
MTZ-RIPO Minsk (Belarus)	2–3	(Czech Republic) Teplice	1–1	1–2
Groclin Grodzisk Wielkopolski (Poland)	4–1	(Slovakia) Dukla Banská Bystrica	4–1	0–0
Banants (Armenia)	2–8	(Ukraine) Dnipro Dnipropetrovsk	2–4	0–4
Legia Warsaw (Poland)	1–5	(Switzerland) Zürich	0–1	1–4
Northern region
Halmstads BK (Sweden)	5–3	(Northern Ireland) Linfield	1–1	4–2
Midtjylland (Denmark)	4–3	(Faroe Islands) B36	2–1	2–2
Brann (Norway)	2–0	(Finland) Allianssi	0–0	2–0
Liepājas Metalurgs (Latvia)	2–6	(Belgium) Genk	2–3	0–3
Rhyl (Wales)	1–3	(Norway) Viking	0–1	1–2
MYPA (Finland)	2–2 (a)	(Scotland) Dundee United	0–0	2–2
Copenhagen (Denmark)	4–0	(Wales) Carmarthen Town	2–0	2–0
Mainz 05 (Germany)	4–0	(Iceland) Keflavík	2–0	2–0
Djurgårdens IF (Sweden)	1–1 (a)	(Republic of Ireland) Cork City	1–1	0–0
Esbjerg (Denmark)	1–1 (2–3 p)	(Norway) Tromsø	0–1	1–0 (a.e.t.)

== First round ==
Team 1	Agg.	Team 2	1st leg	2nd leg
APOEL (Cyprus)	1–4	(Germany) Hertha BSC	0–1	1–3
Auxerre (France)	2–2 (a)	(Bulgaria) Levski Sofia	2–1	0–1
Baník Ostrava (Czech Republic)	2–5	(Netherlands) Heerenveen	2–0	0–5
Basel (Switzerland)	6–0	(Bosnia and Herzegovina) Široki Brijeg	5–0	1–0
Bayer Leverkusen (Germany)	0–2	(Bulgaria) CSKA Sofia	0–1	0–1
Beşiktaş (Turkey)	4–2	(Sweden) Malmö FF	0–1	4–1
Bolton Wanderers (England)	4–2	(Bulgaria) Lokomotiv Plovdiv	2–1	2–1
Brøndby (Denmark)	3–2	(Switzerland) Zürich	2–0	1–2
Red Star Belgrade (Serbia and Montenegro)	1–1 (a)	(Portugal) Braga	0–0	1–1
CSKA Moscow (Russia)	6–2	(Denmark) Midtjylland	3–1	3–1
Dinamo București (Romania)	5–2	(England) Everton	5–1	0–1
Feyenoord (Netherlands)	1–2	(Romania) Rapid București	1–1	0–1
Teplice (Czech Republic)	1–3	(Spain) Espanyol	1–1	0–2
Germinal Beerschot (Belgium)	0–0 (1–4 p)	(France) Marseille	0–0	0–0 (a.e.t.)
Grasshopper (Switzerland)	4–1	(Finland) MYPA	1–1	3–0
GAK (Austria)	0–7	(France) Strasbourg	0–2	0–5
Vitória de Guimarães (Portugal)	4–0	(Poland) Wisła Kraków	3–0	1–0
Halmstads BK (Sweden)	4–4 (a)	(Portugal) Sporting CP	1–2	3–2 (a.e.t.)
Hamburger SV (Germany)	2–1	(Denmark) Copenhagen	1–1	1–0
Hibernian (Scotland)	1–5	(Ukraine) Dnipro Dnipropetrovsk	0–0	1–5
Krylia Sovetov Samara (Russia)	6–6 (a)	(Netherlands) AZ	5–3	1–3
Lens (France)	5–3	(Poland) Groclin Grodzisk Wielkopolski	1–1	4–2
Litex Lovech (Bulgaria)	3–2	(Belgium) Genk	2–2	1–0
Maccabi Petah Tikva (Israel)	5–4	(Serbia and Montenegro) Partizan	0–2	5–2
Middlesbrough (England)	2–0	(Greece) Skoda Xanthi	2–0	0–0
Monaco (France)	5–1	(Netherlands) Willem II	2–0	3–1
Palermo (Italy)	6–1	(Cyprus) Anorthosis Famagusta	2–1	4–0
PAOK (Greece)	3–3 (a)	(Ukraine) Metalurh Donetsk	1–1	2–2
Rennes (France)	3–1	(Spain) Osasuna	3–1	0–0
Roma (Italy)	5–1	(Greece) Aris	5–1	0–0
Sevilla (Spain)	2–0	(Germany) Mainz 05	0–0	2–0
Shakhtar Donetsk (Ukraine)	6–1	(Hungary) Debrecen	4–1	2–0
Brann (Norway)	3–5	(Russia) Lokomotiv Moscow	1–2	2–3
Slavia Prague (Czech Republic)	4–1	(Republic of Ireland) Cork City	2–0	2–1
Tromsø (Norway)	2–1	(Turkey) Galatasaray	1–0	1–1
Vålerenga (Norway)	1–6	(Romania) Steaua București	0–3	1–3
VfB Stuttgart (Germany)	2–1	(Slovenia) Domžale	2–0	0–1
Viking (Norway)	2–2 (a)	Austria Wien	1–0	1–2
Vitória de Setúbal (Portugal)	1–2	(Italy) Sampdoria	1–1	0–1
Zenit Saint Petersburg (Russia)	1–0	(Greece) AEK Athens	0–0	1–0

== Group stage ==
Teams that have qualified for the group stage of the 2005–06 UEFA Cup
Red: Group A; Yellow: Group B; Green: Group C; Black: Group D;
Purple: Group E; Pink: Group F; Blue: Group G; Orange: Group H.

Based on paragraph 4.06 in the UEFA regulations for the current season, tiebreakers, if necessary, are applied in the following order:

1. Cumulative goal difference in group matches
2. Total goals scored in group matches
3. Away goals scored in group matches
4. Higher number of UEFA coefficient points accumulated by the club in question, as well as its association, over the previous five seasons (see paragraph 6.03 of the UEFA regulations)

=== Group A ===
Pos	Team	Pld	W	D	L	GF	GA	GD	Pts	Qualification	MON	HSV	SLA	VIK	CSS
1	(France) Monaco	4	3	0	1	6	2	+4	9	Advance to knockout stage	—	2–0	—	—	2–1
2	(Germany) Hamburger SV	4	3	0	1	5	2	+3	9	Advance to knockout stage	—	—	2–0	2–0	—
3	(Czech Republic) Slavia Prague	4	1	1	2	6	8	−2	4	Advance to knockout stage	0–2	—	—	—	4–2
4	(Norway) Viking	4	1	1	2	3	6	−3	4		1–0	—	2–2	—	—
5	(Bulgaria) CSKA Sofia	4	1	0	3	5	7	−2	3		—	0–1	—	2–0	—

=== Group B ===
Pos	Team	Pld	W	D	L	GF	GA	GD	Pts	Qualification	PAL	ESP	LOK	BRØ	MPT
1	(Italy) Palermo	4	2	2	0	6	2	+4	8	Advance to knockout stage	—	—	0–0	3–0	—
2	(Spain) Espanyol	4	2	2	0	4	2	+2	8	Advance to knockout stage	1–1	—	—	—	1–0
3	(Russia) Lokomotiv Moscow	4	2	1	1	8	3	+5	7	Advance to knockout stage	—	0–1	—	4–2	—
4	(Denmark) Brøndby	4	1	1	2	5	8	−3	4		—	1–1	—	—	2–0
5	(Israel) Maccabi Petah Tikva	4	0	0	4	1	9	−8	0		1–2	—	0–4	—	—

=== Group C ===
Pos	Team	Pld	W	D	L	GF	GA	GD	Pts	Qualification	STE	RCL	BSC	SAM	HBK
1	(Romania) Steaua București	4	2	2	0	7	0	+7	8	Advance to knockout stage	—	4–0	—	—	3–0
2	(France) Lens	4	2	1	1	7	5	+2	7	Advance to knockout stage	—	—	—	2–1	5–0
3	(Germany) Hertha BSC	4	1	3	0	1	0	+1	6	Advance to knockout stage	0–0	0–0	—	—	—
4	(Italy) Sampdoria	4	1	2	1	4	3	+1	5		0–0	—	0–0	—	—
5	(Sweden) Halmstads BK	4	0	0	4	1	12	−11	0		—	—	0–1	1–3	—

=== Group D ===
Pos	Team	Pld	W	D	L	GF	GA	GD	Pts	Qualification	MID	AZ	LIT	DNI	GRA
1	(England) Middlesbrough	4	3	1	0	6	0	+6	10	Advance to knockout stage	—	—	2–0	3–0	—
2	(Netherlands) AZ	4	3	1	0	5	1	+4	10	Advance to knockout stage	0–0	—	—	—	1–0
3	(Bulgaria) Litex Lovech	4	2	0	2	4	5	−1	6	Advance to knockout stage	—	0–2	—	—	2–1
4	(Ukraine) Dnipro Dnipropetrovsk	4	1	0	3	4	9	−5	3		—	1–2	0–2	—	—
5	(Switzerland) Grasshopper	4	0	0	4	3	7	−4	0		0–1	—	—	2–3	—

=== Group E ===
Pos	Team	Pld	W	D	L	GF	GA	GD	Pts	Qualification	STR	ROM	BSL	RSB	TRO
1	(France) Strasbourg	4	2	2	0	7	3	+4	8	Advance to knockout stage	—	—	—	2–2	2–0
2	(Italy) Roma	4	2	1	1	7	6	+1	7	Advance to knockout stage	1–1	—	3–1	—	—
3	(Switzerland) Basel	4	2	0	2	7	9	−2	6	Advance to knockout stage	0–2	—	—	—	4–3
4	(Serbia and Montenegro) Red Star Belgrade	4	1	1	2	7	8	−1	4		—	3–1	1–2	—	—
5	(Norway) Tromsø	4	1	0	3	7	9	−2	3		—	1–2	—	3–1	—

=== Group F ===
Pos	Team	Pld	W	D	L	GF	GA	GD	Pts	Qualification	OM	LS	HVN	CSM	DB
1	(France) Marseille	4	3	0	1	5	3	+2	9	Advance to knockout stage	—	—	1–0	—	2–1
2	(Bulgaria) Levski Sofia	4	2	0	2	4	4	0	6	Advance to knockout stage	1–0	—	—	—	1–0
3	(Netherlands) Heerenveen	4	1	2	1	2	2	0	5	Advance to knockout stage	—	2–1	—	0–0	—
4	(Russia) CSKA Moscow	4	1	1	2	3	4	−1	4		1–2	2–1	—	—	—
5	(Romania) Dinamo București	4	1	1	2	2	3	−1	4		—	—	0–0	1–0	—

=== Group G ===
Pos	Team	Pld	W	D	L	GF	GA	GD	Pts	Qualification	RAP	SHK	STU	PAOK	REN
1	(Romania) Rapid București	4	3	0	1	5	2	+3	9	Advance to knockout stage	—	—	—	1–0	2–0
2	(Ukraine) Shakhtar Donetsk	4	3	0	1	4	1	+3	9	Advance to knockout stage	0–1	—	—	1–0	—
3	(Germany) VfB Stuttgart	4	3	0	1	6	4	+2	9	Advance to knockout stage	2–1	0–2	—	—	—
4	(Greece) PAOK	4	1	0	3	6	5	+1	3		—	—	1–2	—	5–1
5	(France) Rennes	4	0	0	4	1	10	−9	0		—	0–1	0–2	—	—

=== Group H ===
Pos	Team	Pld	W	D	L	GF	GA	GD	Pts	Qualification	SEV	ZEN	BOL	BJK	VIT
1	(Spain) Sevilla	4	2	1	1	8	4	+4	7	Advance to knockout stage	—	—	—	3–0	3–1
2	(Russia) Zenit Saint Petersburg	4	2	1	1	5	4	+1	7	Advance to knockout stage	2–1	—	—	—	2–1
3	(England) Bolton Wanderers	4	1	3	0	4	3	+1	6	Advance to knockout stage	1–1	1–0	—	—	—
4	(Turkey) Beşiktaş	4	1	2	1	5	6	−1	5		—	1–1	1–1	—	—
5	(Portugal) Vitória de Guimarães	4	0	1	3	4	9	−5	1		—	—	1–1	1–3	—

== Knockout stage ==
=== Bracket ===
Round of 32
(Germany) Hertha BSC	0	0	0
(Romania) Rapid București	1	2	3
(Switzerland) Thun	1	0	1
(Germany) Hamburger SV	0	2	2
(Netherlands) Heerenveen	1	1	2
(Romania) Steaua București	3	0	3
(Spain) Real Betis (a.e.t.)	2	1	3
(Netherlands) AZ	0	2	2
(Switzerland) Basel	1	1	2
(France) Monaco	0	1	1
(Bulgaria) Litex Lovech	0	0	0
(France) Strasbourg	2	0	2
(Germany) VfB Stuttgart	1	1	2
(England) Middlesbrough (a)	2	0	2
(Belgium) Club Brugge	1	1	2
(Italy) Roma	2	2	4
(Italy) Udinese	3	0	3
(France) Lens	0	1	1
(Slovakia) Artmedia Bratislava	0	0	0
(Bulgaria) Levski Sofia	1	2	3
(Czech Republic) Slavia Prague	2	0	2
(Italy) Palermo (a)	1	1	2
(Germany) Schalke 04	2	3	5
(Spain) Espanyol	1	0	1
(France) Lille	3	0	3
(Ukraine) Shakhtar Donetsk	2	0	2
(Russia) Lokomotiv Moscow	0	0	0
(Spain) Sevilla	1	2	3
(England) Bolton Wanderers	0	1	1
(France) Marseille	0	2	2
(Norway) Rosenborg	0	1	1
(Russia) Zenit Saint Petersburg	2	2	4

Round of 16
(Romania) Rapid București (a)	2	1	3
(Germany) Hamburger SV	0	3	3
(Romania) Steaua București	0	3	3
(Spain) Real Betis	0	0	0
(Switzerland) Basel	2	2	4
(France) Strasbourg	0	2	2
(England) Middlesbrough (a)	1	1	2
(Italy) Roma	0	2	2
(Italy) Udinese	0	1	1
(Bulgaria) Levski Sofia	0	2	2
(Italy) Palermo	1	0	1
(Germany) Schalke 04	0	3	3
(France) Lille	1	0	1
(Spain) Sevilla	0	2	2
(France) Marseille	0	1	1
(Russia) Zenit Saint Petersburg	1	1	2

Quarter-finals
(Romania) Rapid București	1	0	1
(Romania) Steaua București (a)	1	0	1
(Switzerland) Basel	2	1	3
(England) Middlesbrough	0	4	4
(Bulgaria) Levski Sofia	1	1	2
(Germany) Schalke 04	3	1	4
(Spain) Sevilla	4	1	5
(Russia) Zenit Saint Petersburg	1	1	2

Semi-finals
(Romania) Steaua București	1	2	3
(England) Middlesbrough	0	4	4
(Germany) Schalke 04	0	0	0
(Spain) Sevilla (a.e.t.)	0	1	1

Final
10 May – Eindhoven
(England) Middlesbrough	0
(Spain) Sevilla	4

=== Round of 32 ===
The top three teams from each group were joined by the eight teams that finished third in their groups in the Champions League.

Team 1	Agg.	Team 2	1st leg	2nd leg
Litex Lovech (Bulgaria)	0–2	(France) Strasbourg	0–2	0–0
VfB Stuttgart (Germany)	2–2 (a)	(England) Middlesbrough	1–2	1–0
Slavia Prague (Czech Republic)	2–2 (a)	(Italy) Palermo	2–1	0–1
Heerenveen (Netherlands)	2–3	(Romania) Steaua București	1–3	1–0
Lokomotiv Moscow (Russia)	0–3	(Spain) Sevilla	0–1	0–2
Bolton Wanderers (England)	1–2	(France) Marseille	0–0	1–2
Hertha BSC (Germany)	0–3	(Romania) Rapid București	0–1	0–2
Basel (Switzerland)	2–1	(France) Monaco	1–0	1–1
Udinese (Italy)	3–1	(France) Lens	3–0	0–1
Rosenborg (Norway)	1–4	(Russia) Zenit Saint Petersburg	0–2	1–2
Club Brugge (Belgium)	2–4	(Italy) Roma	1–2	1–2
Schalke 04 (Germany)	5–1	(Spain) Espanyol	2–1	3–0
Lille (France)	3–2	(Ukraine) Shakhtar Donetsk	3–2	0–0
Thun (Switzerland)	1–2	(Germany) Hamburger SV	1–0	0–2
Real Betis (Spain)	3–2	(Netherlands) AZ	2–0	1–2 (a.e.t.)
Artmedia Bratislava (Slovakia)	0–3	(Bulgaria) Levski Sofia	0–1	0–2

=== Round of 16 ===
Team 1	Agg.	Team 2	1st leg	2nd leg
Rapid București (Romania)	3–3 (a)	(Germany) Hamburger SV	2–0	1–3
Basel (Switzerland)	4–2	(France) Strasbourg	2–0	2–2
Middlesbrough (England)	2–2 (a)	(Italy) Roma	1–0	1–2
Steaua București (Romania)	3–0	(Spain) Real Betis	0–0	3–0
Palermo (Italy)	1–3	(Germany) Schalke 04	1–0	0–3
Marseille (France)	1–2	(Russia) Zenit Saint Petersburg	0–1	1–1
Udinese (Italy)	1–2	(Bulgaria) Levski Sofia	0–0	1–2
Lille (France)	1–2	(Spain) Sevilla	1–0	0–2

=== Quarter-finals ===
Team 1	Agg.	Team 2	1st leg	2nd leg
Sevilla (Spain)	5–2	(Russia) Zenit Saint Petersburg	4–1	1–1
Basel (Switzerland)	3–4	(England) Middlesbrough	2–0	1–4
Rapid București (Romania)	1–1 (a)	(Romania) Steaua București	1–1	0–0
Levski Sofia (Bulgaria)	2–4	(Germany) Schalke 04	1–3	1–1

=== Semi-finals ===
Team 1	Agg.	Team 2	1st leg	2nd leg
Schalke 04 (Germany)	0–1	(Spain) Sevilla	0–0	0–1 (a.e.t.)
Steaua București (Romania)	3–4	(England) Middlesbrough	1–0	2–4

=== Final ===
The final was played on 10 May 2006 at Philips Stadion in Eindhoven, Netherlands.

10 May 2006
20:45 UTC+2

Middlesbrough (England)	0–4	(Spain) Sevilla
	Report	Luís Fabiano 27'; Maresca 78', 84'; Kanouté 89'

Philips Stadion, Eindhoven
Attendance: 32,100
Referee: Herbert Fandel (Germany)

== Top goalscorers ==
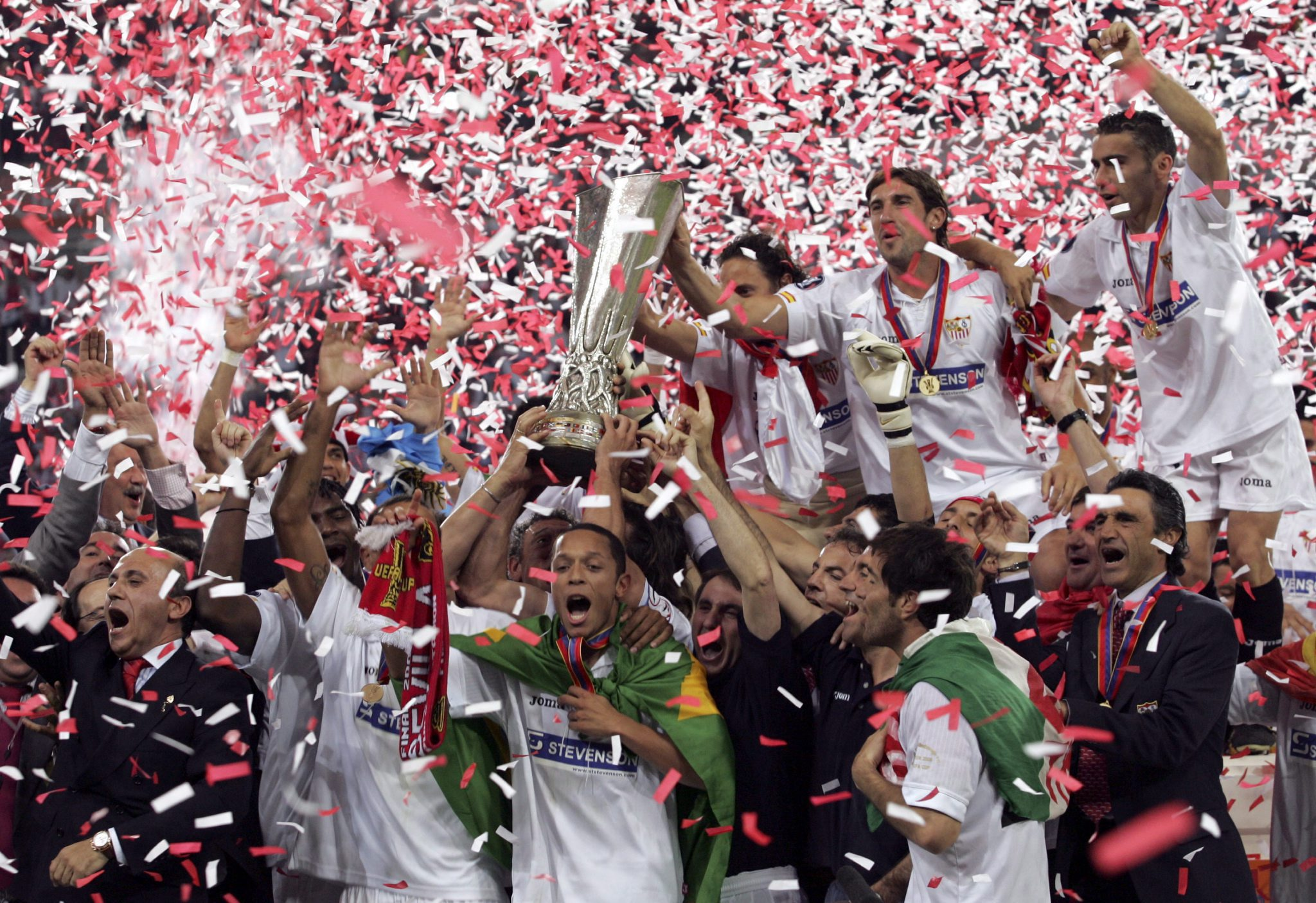
Sevilla celebrating their UEFA Cup victory

Rank	Name	Team	Goals	Minutes played
1	(Argentina) Matías Delgado	(Switzerland) Basel	7	992
2	(Romania) Nicolae Dică	(Romania) Steaua București	6	1157
2	(Australia) Mark Viduka	(England) Middlesbrough	6	667
2	(Argentina) Javier Saviola	(Spain) Sevilla	6	669
2	(Mali) Frédéric Kanouté	(Spain) Sevilla	6	727

== See also ==
- 2005–06 UEFA Champions League
- 2005 UEFA Intertoto Cup
- 2006 UEFA Super Cup
