= 2005–06 UEFA Cup knockout stage =

International football competition

The knockout stage of the 2005–06 UEFA Cup began on 15 February 2006, and concluded with the final at the Philips Stadion in Eindhoven, Netherlands, on 10 May 2006. The final phase involved the 24 teams that finished in the top three in each group in the group stage and the eight teams that finished in third place in the UEFA Champions League group stage.

Each tie in the final phase, apart from the final, was played over two legs, with each team playing one leg at home. The team that had the higher aggregate score over the two legs progressed to the next round. In the event that aggregate scores finished level, the team that scored more goals away from home over the two legs progressed. If away goals are also equal, 30 minutes of extra time were played. If goals were scored during extra time and the aggregate score was still level, the visiting team qualified by virtue of more away goals scored. If no goals were scored during extra time, there would be a penalty shootout after extra time.

In the final, the tie was played over just one leg at a neutral venue. If scores were level at the end of normal time in the final, extra time was played, followed by penalties if scores had remained tied.

== Format ==
In the draw for the round of 32, matches were played between the winner of one group and the third-placed team of a different group, and between the runners-up of one group and the third-placed team from a Champions League group. The only restriction on the drawing of teams in the round of 32 was that the teams must not be from the same national association or have played in the same group in the group stages. From the round of 16 onwards, these restrictions did not apply.

== Qualified teams ==
The knockout stage involved 32 teams: the 24 teams which qualified as the winners, runners-up and third-placed teams of each of the eight groups in the group stage, and the eight third-placed teams from the Champions League group stage.

=== UEFA Cup group stage top-three teams ===
| Group | Winners | Runners-up | Third-placed teams |
|---|---|---|---|
| A | (France) Monaco | (Germany) Hamburger SV | (Czech Republic) Slavia Prague |
| B | (Italy) Palermo | (Spain) Espanyol | (Russia) Lokomotiv Moscow |
| C | (Romania) Steaua București | (France) Lens | (Germany) Hertha BSC |
| D | (England) Middlesbrough | (Netherlands) AZ | (Bulgaria) Litex Lovech |
| E | (France) Strasbourg | (Italy) Roma | (Switzerland) Basel |
| F | (France) Marseille | (Bulgaria) Levski Sofia | (Netherlands) Heerenveen |
| G | (Romania) Rapid București | (Ukraine) Shakhtar Donetsk | (Germany) VfB Stuttgart |
| H | (Spain) Sevilla | (Russia) Zenit Saint Petersburg | (England) Bolton Wanderers |

=== Champions League group stage third-placed teams ===
| Group | Third-placed teams |
|---|---|
| A | (Belgium) Club Brugge |
| B | (Switzerland) Thun |
| C | (Italy) Udinese |
| D | (France) Lille |
| E | (Germany) Schalke 04 |
| F | (Norway) Rosenborg |
| G | (Spain) Real Betis |
| H | (Slovakia) Artmedia Bratislava |

== Bracket ==
Round of 32
(Germany) Hertha BSC | 0 | 0 | 0
(Romania) Rapid București | 1 | 2 | 3
(Switzerland) Thun | 1 | 0 | 1
(Germany) Hamburger SV | 0 | 2 | 2
(Netherlands) Heerenveen | 1 | 1 | 2
(Romania) Steaua București | 3 | 0 | 3
(Spain) Real Betis (a.e.t.) | 2 | 1 | 3
(Netherlands) AZ | 0 | 2 | 2
(Switzerland) Basel | 1 | 1 | 2
(France) Monaco | 0 | 1 | 1
(Bulgaria) Litex Lovech | 0 | 0 | 0
(France) Strasbourg | 2 | 0 | 2
(Germany) VfB Stuttgart | 1 | 1 | 2
(England) Middlesbrough (a) | 2 | 0 | 2
(Belgium) Club Brugge | 1 | 1 | 2
(Italy) Roma | 2 | 2 | 4
(Italy) Udinese | 3 | 0 | 3
(France) Lens | 0 | 1 | 1
(Slovakia) Artmedia Bratislava | 0 | 0 | 0
(Bulgaria) Levski Sofia | 1 | 2 | 3
(Czech Republic) Slavia Prague | 2 | 0 | 2
(Italy) Palermo (a) | 1 | 1 | 2
(Germany) Schalke 04 | 2 | 3 | 5
(Spain) Espanyol | 1 | 0 | 1
(France) Lille | 3 | 0 | 3
(Ukraine) Shakhtar Donetsk | 2 | 0 | 2
(Russia) Lokomotiv Moscow | 0 | 0 | 0
(Spain) Sevilla | 1 | 2 | 3
(England) Bolton Wanderers | 0 | 1 | 1
(France) Marseille | 0 | 2 | 2
(Norway) Rosenborg | 0 | 1 | 1
(Russia) Zenit Saint Petersburg | 2 | 2 | 4

Round of 16
(Romania) Rapid București (a) | 2 | 1 | 3
(Germany) Hamburger SV | 0 | 3 | 3
(Romania) Steaua București | 0 | 3 | 3
(Spain) Real Betis | 0 | 0 | 0
(Switzerland) Basel | 2 | 2 | 4
(France) Strasbourg | 0 | 2 | 2
(England) Middlesbrough (a) | 1 | 1 | 2
(Italy) Roma | 0 | 2 | 2
(Italy) Udinese | 0 | 1 | 1
(Bulgaria) Levski Sofia | 0 | 2 | 2
(Italy) Palermo | 1 | 0 | 1
(Germany) Schalke 04 | 0 | 3 | 3
(France) Lille | 1 | 0 | 1
(Spain) Sevilla | 0 | 2 | 2
(France) Marseille | 0 | 1 | 1
(Russia) Zenit Saint Petersburg | 1 | 1 | 2

Quarter-finals
(Romania) Rapid București | 1 | 0 | 1
(Romania) Steaua București (a) | 1 | 0 | 1
(Switzerland) Basel | 2 | 1 | 3
(England) Middlesbrough | 0 | 4 | 4
(Bulgaria) Levski Sofia | 1 | 1 | 2
(Germany) Schalke 04 | 3 | 1 | 4
(Spain) Sevilla | 4 | 1 | 5
(Russia) Zenit Saint Petersburg | 1 | 1 | 2

Semi-finals
(Romania) Steaua București | 1 | 2 | 3
(England) Middlesbrough | 0 | 4 | 4
(Germany) Schalke 04 | 0 | 0 | 0
(Spain) Sevilla (a.e.t.) | 0 | 1 | 1

Final
10 May – Eindhoven
(England) Middlesbrough | 0
(Spain) Sevilla | 4

== Round of 32 ==
The top three teams from each group were joined by the eight teams that finished third in their groups in the Champions League.

=== Summary ===
| Team 1 | Agg. | Team 2 | 1st leg | 2nd leg |
|---|---|---|---|---|
| Litex Lovech (Bulgaria) | 0–2 | (France) Strasbourg | 0–2 | 0–0 |
| VfB Stuttgart (Germany) | 2–2 (a) | (England) Middlesbrough | 1–2 | 1–0 |
| Slavia Prague (Czech Republic) | 2–2 (a) | (Italy) Palermo | 2–1 | 0–1 |
| Heerenveen (Netherlands) | 2–3 | (Romania) Steaua București | 1–3 | 1–0 |
| Lokomotiv Moscow (Russia) | 0–3 | (Spain) Sevilla | 0–1 | 0–2 |
| Bolton Wanderers (England) | 1–2 | (France) Marseille | 0–0 | 1–2 |
| Hertha BSC (Germany) | 0–3 | (Romania) Rapid București | 0–1 | 0–2 |
| Basel (Switzerland) | 2–1 | (France) Monaco | 1–0 | 1–1 |
| Udinese (Italy) | 3–1 | (France) Lens | 3–0 | 0–1 |
| Rosenborg (Norway) | 1–4 | (Russia) Zenit Saint Petersburg | 0–2 | 1–2 |
| Club Brugge (Belgium) | 2–4 | (Italy) Roma | 1–2 | 1–2 |
| Schalke 04 (Germany) | 5–1 | (Spain) Espanyol | 2–1 | 3–0 |
| Lille (France) | 3–2 | (Ukraine) Shakhtar Donetsk | 3–2 | 0–0 |
| Thun (Switzerland) | 1–2 | (Germany) Hamburger SV | 1–0 | 0–2 |
| Real Betis (Spain) | 3–2 | (Netherlands) AZ | 2–0 | 1–2 (a.e.t.) |
| Artmedia Bratislava (Slovakia) | 0–3 | (Bulgaria) Levski Sofia | 0–1 | 0–2 |

=== Matches ===
15 February 2006
15:30

| Litex Lovech (Bulgaria) | 0–2 | (France) Strasbourg |
|---|---|---|
| | Report | Le Pen 2'; Diané 82' |

Lovech Stadium, Lovech
Attendance: 3,546
Referee: Grzegorz Gilewski (Poland)
23 February 2006
19:00

| Strasbourg (France) | 0–0 | (Bulgaria) Litex Lovech |
|---|---|---|
| | Report |

Stade de la Meinau, Strasbourg
Attendance: 9,760
Referee: Darko Čeferin (Slovenia)

Strasbourg won 2–0 on aggregate.

16 February 2006
20:45

| VfB Stuttgart (Germany) | 1–2 | (England) Middlesbrough |
|---|---|---|
| Ljuboja 86' | Report | Hasselbaink 20'; Parnaby 46' |

Gottlieb-Daimler-Stadion, Stuttgart
Attendance: 18,638
Referee: Alain Hamer (Luxembourg)
23 February 2006
20:45

| Middlesbrough (England) | 0–1 | (Germany) VfB Stuttgart |
|---|---|---|
| | Report | Tiffert 13' |

Riverside Stadium, Middlesbrough
Attendance: 24,018
Referee: Eric Braamhaar (Netherlands)

2–2 on aggregate; Middlesbrough won on away goals.

16 February 2006
20:45

| Slavia Prague (Czech Republic) | 2–1 | (Italy) Palermo |
|---|---|---|
| Jarolím 28'; Piták 48' | Report | Conteh 40' |

Stadion Evžena Rošického, Prague
Attendance: 6,706
Referee: Anton Genov (Bulgaria)
23 February 2006
16:00

| Palermo (Italy) | 1–0 | (Czech Republic) Slavia Prague |
|---|---|---|
| Godeas 51' | Report |

Stadio Renzo Barbera, Palermo
Attendance: 8,063
Referee: Paul Allaerts (Belgium)

2–2 on aggregate; Palermo won on away goals.

15 February 2006
19:15

| Heerenveen (Netherlands) | 1–3 | (Romania) Steaua București |
|---|---|---|
| Bruggink 24' | Report | Dică 29'; Goian 76'; Paraschiv 78' |

Abe Lenstra Stadion, Heerenveen
Attendance: 20,500
Referee: Stuart Dougal (Scotland)
23 February 2006
18:00

| Steaua București (Romania) | 0–1 | (Netherlands) Heerenveen |
|---|---|---|
| | Report | Bruggink 85' |

Stadionul Național, Bucharest
Attendance: 46,697
Referee: Jaroslav Jára (Czech Republic)

Steaua București won 3–2 on aggregate.

15 February 2006
17:30

| Lokomotiv Moscow (Russia) | 0–1 | (Spain) Sevilla |
|---|---|---|
| | Report | López 75' |

Lokomotiv Stadium, Moscow
Attendance: 10,223
Referee: Steve Bennett (England)
23 February 2006
21:30

| Sevilla (Spain) | 2–0 | (Russia) Lokomotiv Moscow |
|---|---|---|
| Maresca 34'; Puerta 90' | Report |

Ramón Sánchez Pizjuán Stadium, Seville
Attendance: 19,970
Referee: Alain Sars (France)

Sevilla won 3–0 on aggregate.

15 February 2006
20:45

| Bolton Wanderers (England) | 0–0 | (France) Marseille |
|---|---|---|
| | Report |

Reebok Stadium, Horwich
Attendance: 19,288
Referee: Olegário Benquerença (Portugal)
23 February 2006
20:45

| Marseille (France) | 2–1 | (England) Bolton Wanderers |
|---|---|---|
| Ribéry 45+2'; Ben Haim 68' (o.g.) | Report | Giannakopoulos 25' |

Stade Vélodrome, Marseille
Attendance: 38,351
Referee: Massimo Busacca (Switzerland)

Marseille won 2–1 on aggregate.

15 February 2006
18:00

| Hertha BSC (Germany) | 0–1 | (Romania) Rapid București |
|---|---|---|
| | Report | Negru 68' (pen.) |

Olympiastadion, Berlin
Attendance: 13,430
Referee: Eduardo Iturralde González (Spain)
23 February 2006
16:15

| Rapid București (Romania) | 2–0 | (Germany) Hertha BSC |
|---|---|---|
| Niculae 50'; Buga 79' | Report |

Stadionul Giulești-Valentin Stănescu, Bucharest
Attendance: 13,400
Referee: Bertrand Layec (France)

Rapid București won 3–0 on aggregate.

15 February 2006
18:00

| Basel (Switzerland) | 1–0 | (France) Monaco |
|---|---|---|
| Degen 78' | Report |

St. Jakob-Park, Basel
Attendance: 14,143
Referee: Pieter Vink (Netherlands)
23 February 2006
20:45

| Monaco (France) | 1–1 | (Switzerland) Basel |
|---|---|---|
| Vieri 21' (pen.) | Report | Majstorović 56' |

Stade Louis II, Monaco
Attendance: 11,955
Referee: Costas Kapitanis (Cyprus)

Basel won 2–1 on aggregate.

15 February 2006
20:45

| Udinese (Italy) | 3–0 | (France) Lens |
|---|---|---|
| Di Natale 35'; Barreto 61', 82' | Report |

Stadio Friuli, Udine
Attendance: 6,928
Referee: Manuel Mejuto González (Spain)
23 February 2006
20:45

| Lens (France) | 1–0 | (Italy) Udinese |
|---|---|---|
| Frau 55' | Report |

Stade Félix-Bollaert, Lens
Attendance: 26,292
Referee: Herbert Fandel (Germany)

Udinese won 3–1 on aggregate.

15 February 2006
19:30

| Rosenborg (Norway) | 0–2 | (Russia) Zenit Saint Petersburg |
|---|---|---|
| | Report | Arshavin 22'; Kerzhakov 32' |

Lerkendal Stadion, Trondheim
Attendance: 11,082
Referee: Lucílio Batista (Portugal)
23 February 2006
18:00

| Zenit Saint Petersburg (Russia) | 2–1 | (Norway) Rosenborg |
|---|---|---|
| Kerzhakov 55'; Denisov 86' | Report | Riseth 45' |

Petrovsky Stadium, Saint Petersburg
Attendance: 19,133
Referee: Vladimír Hriňák (Slovakia)

Zenit Saint Petersburg won 4–1 on aggregate.

15 February 2006
20:45

| Club Brugge (Belgium) | 1–2 | (Italy) Roma |
|---|---|---|
| Portillo 61' | Report | Vanaudenaerde 44' (o.g.); Perrotta 74' |

Jan Breydel Stadium, Bruges
Attendance: 27,138
Referee: Yuri Baskakov (Russia)
23 February 2006
21:00

| Roma (Italy) | 2–1 | (Belgium) Club Brugge |
|---|---|---|
| Mancini 55'; Bovo 71' | Report | Verheyen 60' |

Stadio Olimpico, Rome
Attendance: 15,209
Referee: Claus Bo Larsen (Denmark)

Roma won 4–2 on aggregate.

15 February 2006
20:00

| Schalke 04 (Germany) | 2–1 | (Spain) Espanyol |
|---|---|---|
| Bordon 67'; Ernst 88' | Report | García 34' |

Veltins-Arena, Gelsenkirchen
Attendance: 53,642
Referee: Roberto Rosetti (Italy)
23 February 2006
21:45

| Espanyol (Spain) | 0–3 | (Germany) Schalke 04 |
|---|---|---|
| | Report | Kurányi 54'; Sand 70'; Lincoln 73' |

Estadi Olímpic Lluís Companys, Barcelona
Attendance: 18,100
Referee: Tom Henning Øvrebø (Norway)

Schalke 04 won 5–1 on aggregate.

15 February 2006
19:45

| Lille (France) | 3–2 | (Ukraine) Shakhtar Donetsk |
|---|---|---|
| Fauvergue 19'; Dernis 57'; Odemwingie 77' | Report | Brandão 89'; Marica 90+1' |

Stadium Nord Lille Métropole, Villeneuve-d'Ascq
Attendance: 13,644
Referee: Gianluca Paparesta (Italy)
23 February 2006
18:00

| Shakhtar Donetsk (Ukraine) | 0–0 | (France) Lille |
|---|---|---|
| | Report |

RSC Olimpiyskiy, Donetsk
Attendance: 23,250
Referee: Nicolai Vollquartz (Denmark)

Lille won 3–2 on aggregate.

16 February 2006
18:30

| Thun (Switzerland) | 1–0 | (Germany) Hamburger SV |
|---|---|---|
| Adriano 30' | Report |

Stade de Suisse, Wankdorf, Bern
Attendance: 18,354
Referee: Martin Hansson (Sweden)
23 February 2006
18:30

| Hamburger SV (Germany) | 2–0 | (Switzerland) Thun |
|---|---|---|
| Van Buyten 2', 33' | Report |

Volksparkstadion, Hamburg
Attendance: 40,254
Referee: Alon Yefet (Israel)

Hamburger SV won 2–1 on aggregate.

15 February 2006
21:30

| Real Betis (Spain) | 2–0 | (Netherlands) AZ |
|---|---|---|
| Tardelli 70'; Robert 79' | Report |

Estadio Manuel Ruiz de Lopera, Seville
Attendance: 11,112
Referee: Nikolai Ivanov (Russia)
23 February 2006
20:45

| AZ (Netherlands) | 2–1 (a.e.t.) | (Spain) Real Betis |
|---|---|---|
| Arveladze 26'; Jaliens 35' | Report | Melli 99' |

Alkmaarderhout, Alkmaar
Attendance: 8,073
Referee: Florian Meyer (Germany)

Real Betis won 3–2 on aggregate.

15 February 2006
17:30

| Artmedia Bratislava (Slovakia) | 0–1 | (Bulgaria) Levski Sofia |
|---|---|---|
| | Report | Angelov 9' |

Štadión Antona Malatinského, Trnava
Attendance: 5,297
Referee: Laurent Duhamel (France)
23 February 2006
17:00

| Levski Sofia (Bulgaria) | 2–0 | (Slovakia) Artmedia Bratislava |
|---|---|---|
| Angelov 14', 27' | Report |

Vasil Levski National Stadium, Sofia
Attendance: 23,441
Referee: Gerald Lehner (Austria)

Levski Sofia won 3–0 on aggregate.

== Round of 16 ==
=== Summary ===
| Team 1 | Agg. | Team 2 | 1st leg | 2nd leg |
|---|---|---|---|---|
| Rapid București (Romania) | 3–3 (a) | (Germany) Hamburger SV | 2–0 | 1–3 |
| Basel (Switzerland) | 4–2 | (France) Strasbourg | 2–0 | 2–2 |
| Middlesbrough (England) | 2–2 (a) | (Italy) Roma | 1–0 | 1–2 |
| Steaua București (Romania) | 3–0 | (Spain) Real Betis | 0–0 | 3–0 |
| Palermo (Italy) | 1–3 | (Germany) Schalke 04 | 1–0 | 0–3 |
| Marseille (France) | 1–2 | (Russia) Zenit Saint Petersburg | 0–1 | 1–1 |
| Udinese (Italy) | 1–2 | (Bulgaria) Levski Sofia | 0–0 | 1–2 |
| Lille (France) | 1–2 | (Spain) Sevilla | 1–0 | 0–2 |

=== Matches ===
9 March 2006
16:00

| Rapid București (Romania) | 2–0 | (Germany) Hamburger SV |
|---|---|---|
| Niculae 45+2'; Buga 88' | Report |

Stadionul Giulești-Valentin Stănescu, Bucharest
Attendance: 16,300
Referee: Kyros Vassaras (Greece)
15 March 2006
19:00

| Hamburger SV (Germany) | 3–1 | (Romania) Rapid București |
|---|---|---|
| Lauth 24'; Barbarez 36'; Van der Vaart 62' | Report | Buga 51' |

Volksparkstadion, Hamburg
Attendance: 37,886
Referee: Claus Bo Larsen (Denmark)

3–3 on aggregate; Rapid București won on away goals.

9 March 2006
20:15

| Basel (Switzerland) | 2–0 | (France) Strasbourg |
|---|---|---|
| Delgado 86'; Kuzmanović 89' | Report |

St. Jakob-Park, Basel
Attendance: 14,243
Referee: Stefano Farina (Italy)
16 March 2006
18:00

| Strasbourg (France) | 2–2 | (Switzerland) Basel |
|---|---|---|
| Carlier 11'; Kanté 78' | Report | Eduardo 3', 26' |

Stade de la Meinau, Strasbourg
Attendance: 7,322
Referee: Olegário Benquerença (Portugal)

Basel won 4–2 on aggregate.

9 March 2006
21:00

| Middlesbrough (England) | 1–0 | (Italy) Roma |
|---|---|---|
| Yakubu 12' (pen.) | Report |

Riverside Stadium, Middlesbrough
Attendance: 25,354
Referee: Alain Sars (France)
15 March 2006
21:00

| Roma (Italy) | 2–1 | (England) Middlesbrough |
|---|---|---|
| Mancini 43', 66' (pen.) | Report | Hasselbaink 32' |

Stadio Olimpico, Rome
Attendance: 32,642
Referee: Tom Henning Øvrebø (Norway)

2–2 on aggregate; Middlesbrough won on away goals.

9 March 2006
18:00

| Steaua București (Romania) | 0–0 | (Spain) Real Betis |
|---|---|---|
| | Report |

Stadionul Național, Bucharest
Attendance: 45,003
Referee: Yuri Baskakov (Russia)
16 March 2006
21:30

| Real Betis (Spain) | 0–3 | (Romania) Steaua București |
|---|---|---|
| | Report | Nicoliță 54', 82'; Iacob 78' |

Estadio Benito Villamarín, Seville
Attendance: 16,861
Referee: Massimo De Santis (Italy)

Steaua București won 3–0 on aggregate.

9 March 2006
18:00

| Palermo (Italy) | 1–0 | (Germany) Schalke 04 |
|---|---|---|
| Brienza 15' | Report |

Stadio Renzo Barbera, Palermo
Attendance: 10,581
Referee: Eric Braamhaar (Netherlands)
16 March 2006
20:30

| Schalke 04 (Germany) | 3–0 | (Italy) Palermo |
|---|---|---|
| Kobiashvili 44' (pen.); Larsen 72'; Azaouagh 80' | Report |

Veltins-Arena, Gelsenkirchen
Attendance: 52,151
Referee: Graham Poll (England)

Schalke 04 won 3–1 on aggregate.

9 March 2006
20:45

| Marseille (France) | 0–1 | (Russia) Zenit Saint Petersburg |
|---|---|---|
| | Report | Arshavin 51' |

Stade Vélodrome, Marseille
Attendance: 21,500
Referee: Luis Medina Cantalejo (Spain)
16 March 2006
17:00

| Zenit Saint Petersburg (Russia) | 1–1 | (France) Marseille |
|---|---|---|
| Kerzhakov 69' | Report | Déhu 74' |

Petrovsky Stadium, Saint Petersburg
Attendance: 18,902
Referee: Herbert Fandel (Germany)

Zenit Saint Petersburg won 2–1 on aggregate.

9 March 2006
20:45

| Udinese (Italy) | 0–0 | (Bulgaria) Levski Sofia |
|---|---|---|
| | Report |

Stadio Friuli, Udine
Attendance: 7,650
Referee: Frank De Bleeckere (Belgium)
16 March 2006
17:30

| Levski Sofia (Bulgaria) | 2–1 | (Italy) Udinese |
|---|---|---|
| Borimirov 51'; Tomašić 63' | Report | Tissone 22' |

Vasil Levski National Stadium, Sofia
Attendance: 33,218
Referee: Steve Bennett (England)

Levski Sofia won 2–1 on aggregate.

9 March 2006
19:00

| Lille (France) | 1–0 | (Spain) Sevilla |
|---|---|---|
| Dernis 24' | Report |

Stadium Nord Lille Métropole, Villeneuve-d'Ascq
Attendance: 11,009
Referee: Wolfgang Stark (Germany)
15 March 2006
21:00

| Sevilla (Spain) | 2–0 | (France) Lille |
|---|---|---|
| Kanouté 29'; Luís Fabiano 45+2' | Report |

Ramón Sánchez Pizjuán Stadium, Seville
Attendance: 33,660
Referee: Mike Riley (England)

Sevilla won 2–1 on aggregate.

== Quarter-finals ==
=== Summary ===
| Team 1 | Agg. | Team 2 | 1st leg | 2nd leg |
|---|---|---|---|---|
| Sevilla (Spain) | 5–2 | (Russia) Zenit Saint Petersburg | 4–1 | 1–1 |
| Basel (Switzerland) | 3–4 | (England) Middlesbrough | 2–0 | 1–4 |
| Rapid București (Romania) | 1–1 (a) | (Romania) Steaua București | 1–1 | 0–0 |
| Levski Sofia (Bulgaria) | 2–4 | (Germany) Schalke 04 | 1–3 | 1–1 |

=== Matches ===
30 March 2006
21:00

| Sevilla (Spain) | 4–1 | (Russia) Zenit Saint Petersburg |
|---|---|---|
| Saviola 14', 80'; Martí 56' (pen.); Adriano 90+3' | Report | Kerzhakov 45' |

Ramón Sánchez Pizjuán Stadium, Seville
Attendance: 28,633
Referee: Alain Hamer (Luxembourg)
6 April 2006
18:00

| Zenit Saint Petersburg (Russia) | 1–1 | (Spain) Sevilla |
|---|---|---|
| Hyun 50' | Report | Kepa 66' |

Petrovsky Stadium, Saint Petersburg
Attendance: 17,028
Referee: Stefano Farina (Italy)

Sevilla won 5–2 on aggregate.

30 March 2006
20:45

| Basel (Switzerland) | 2–0 | (England) Middlesbrough |
|---|---|---|
| Delgado 43'; Degen 45+1' | Report |

St. Jakob-Park, Basel
Attendance: 23,639
Referee: Roberto Rosetti (Italy)
6 April 2006
21:00

| Middlesbrough (England) | 4–1 | (Switzerland) Basel |
|---|---|---|
| Viduka 33', 57'; Hasselbaink 79'; Maccarone 90' | Report | Eduardo 23' |

Riverside Stadium, Middlesbrough
Attendance: 24,521
Referee: Yuri Baskakov (Russia)

Middlesbrough won 4–3 on aggregate.

30 March 2006
19:45

| Rapid București (Romania) | 1–1 | (Romania) Steaua București |
|---|---|---|
| Moldovan 50' | Report | Nicoliță 5' |

Stadionul Giulești-Valentin Stănescu, Bucharest
Attendance: 15,000
Referee: Wolfgang Stark (Germany)
6 April 2006
19:30

| Steaua București (Romania) | 0–0 | (Romania) Rapid București |
|---|---|---|
| | Report |

Stadionul Național, Bucharest
Attendance: 39,750
Referee: Luis Medina Cantalejo (Spain)

1–1 on aggregate; Steaua București won on away goals.

30 March 2006
19:00

| Levski Sofia (Bulgaria) | 1–3 | (Germany) Schalke 04 |
|---|---|---|
| Borimirov 6' | Report | Varela 48'; Lincoln 69'; Asamoah 79' |

Vasil Levski National Stadium, Sofia
Attendance: 35,792
Referee: Mike Riley (England)
6 April 2006
20:30

| Schalke 04 (Germany) | 1–1 | (Bulgaria) Levski Sofia |
|---|---|---|
| Lincoln 58' | Report | Angelov 24' |

Veltins-Arena, Gelsenkirchen
Attendance: 52,973
Referee: Massimo Busacca (Switzerland)

Schalke 04 won 4–2 on aggregate.

== Semi-finals ==
=== Summary ===
| Team 1 | Agg. | Team 2 | 1st leg | 2nd leg |
|---|---|---|---|---|
| Schalke 04 (Germany) | 0–1 | (Spain) Sevilla | 0–0 | 0–1 (a.e.t.) |
| Steaua București (Romania) | 3–4 | (England) Middlesbrough | 1–0 | 2–4 |

=== Matches ===
20 April 2006
20:30

| Schalke 04 (Germany) | 0–0 | (Spain) Sevilla |
|---|---|---|
| | Report |

Veltins-Arena, Gelsenkirchen
Attendance: 53,551
Referee: Tom Henning Øvrebø (Norway)
27 April 2006
21:30

| Sevilla (Spain) | 1–0 (a.e.t.) | (Germany) Schalke 04 |
|---|---|---|
| Puerta 101' | Report |

Ramón Sánchez Pizjuán Stadium, Seville
Attendance: 39,475
Referee: Massimo De Santis (Italy)

Sevilla won 1–0 on aggregate.

20 April 2006
19:45

| Steaua București (Romania) | 1–0 | (England) Middlesbrough |
|---|---|---|
| Dică 30' | Report |

Stadionul Național, Bucharest
Attendance: 40,482
Referee: Alain Hamer (Luxembourg)
27 April 2006
21:00

| Middlesbrough (England) | 4–2 | (Romania) Steaua București |
|---|---|---|
| Maccarone 33', 89'; Viduka 64'; Riggott 73' | Report | Dică 16'; Goian 24' |

Riverside Stadium, Middlesbrough
Attendance: 34,622
Referee: Ľuboš Micheľ (Slovakia)

Middlesbrough won 4–3 on aggregate.

== Final ==
The final was played on 10 May 2006 at Philips Stadion in Eindhoven, Netherlands.

10 May 2006
20:45

| Middlesbrough (England) | 0–4 | (Spain) Sevilla |
|---|---|---|
| | Report | Luís Fabiano 27'; Maresca 78', 84'; Kanouté 89' |

Philips Stadion, Eindhoven
Attendance: 32,100
Referee: Herbert Fandel (Germany)
