= 2018–19 Cagliari Calcio season =

Cagliari
2018–19 season
- President: Tommaso Giulini
- Manager: Rolando Maran
- Stadium: Sardegna Arena
- Serie A: 15th
- Coppa Italia: Round of 16
- Top goalscorer: League: Leonardo Pavoletti (16); All: Leonardo Pavoletti (18)
- Highest home attendance: 16,223 vs Internazionale (1 March 2019, Serie A)
- Lowest home attendance: 10,119 vs Atalanta (14 January 2019, Coppa Italia)
- Average home league attendance: 15,399
| Home colours | Away colours | Third colours |

The 2018–19 season was Cagliari Calcio's third season back in Serie A after being relegated at the end of the 2014–15 season. The club competed in Serie A, finishing 15th, and in the Coppa Italia, where they were eliminated in the round of 16.

The season was coach Rolando Maran's first in charge of the club, following his departure from fellow mid-table side A.C. ChievoVerona.

== Players ==
=== Squad information ===
As of 26 May 2019

| No. | Name | Nat | Position(s) | Date of birth (age) | Signed from | Signed in | Contract ends | Apps. | Goals | Notes |
Goalkeepers
| 1 | Rafael | (Brazil) | GK | 3 March 1982 (aged 37) | (Italy) Hellas Verona | 2016 | 2019 | 31 | 0 | |
| 12 | Riccardo Daga | (Italy) | GK | 13 January 2000 (aged 19) | (Italy) Cagliari Primavera | 2018 | 2020 | 0 | 0 | |
| 16 | Simone Aresti | (Italy) | GK | 15 March 1986 (aged 33) | (Italy) Olbia | 2018 | 2020 | 1 | 0 | |
| 28 | Alessio Cragno | (Italy) | GK | 28 June 1994 (aged 25) | (Italy) Brescia | 2014 | 2022 | 81 | 0 | |
Defenders
| 3 | Luca Pellegrini | (Italy) | LB | 7 March 1999 (aged 20) | (Italy) Roma | 2019 | 2019 | 12 | 0 | Loan |
| 12 | Fabrizio Cacciatore | (Italy) | RB / LB | 8 October 1986 (aged 32) | (Italy) Chievo | 2019 | 2019 | 7 | 0 | |
| 15 | Ragnar Klavan | (Estonia) | CB | 30 October 1985 (aged 33) | (England) Liverpool | 2018 | 2020 | 15 | 0 | |
| 19 | Fabio Pisacane | (Italy) | CB | 28 January 1986 (aged 33) | (Italy) Avellino | 2015 | 2019 | 110 | 3 | |
| 22 | Charalambos Lykogiannis | (Greece) | LB | 22 October 1993 (aged 25) | (Austria) Sturm Graz | 2018 | 2022 | 22 | 0 | |
| 23 | Luca Ceppitelli | (Italy) | CB | 11 August 1989 (aged 29) | (Italy) Parma | 2014 | 2020 | 121 | 7 | |
| 33 | Darijo Srna | (Croatia) | RB | 1 May 1982 (aged 37) | (Ukraine) Shakhtar Donetsk | 2018 | 2019 | 26 | 0 | |
| 56 | Filippo Romagna | (Italy) | CB | 26 May 1997 (aged 22) | (Italy) Juventus | 2017 | 2022 | 41 | 0 | |
Midfielders
| 6 | Filip Bradarić | (Croatia) | DM | 11 February 1992 (aged 27) | (Croatia) Rijeka | 2018 | 2019 | 27 | 0 | Loan |
| 8 | Luca Cigarini | (Italy) | DM | 20 June 1986 (aged 33) | (Italy) Sampdoria | 2017 | 2019 | 51 | 2 | |
| 10 | João Pedro | (Brazil) | AM | 9 March 1992 (aged 27) | (Portugal) Estoril Praia | 2014 | 2021 | 145 | 37 | |
| 14 | Valter Birsa | (Slovenia) | AM / RW | 7 August 1986 (aged 32) | (Italy) Chievo | 2019 | 2021 | 12 | 0 | |
| 18 | Nicolò Barella | (Italy) | CM | 7 February 1997 (aged 22) | (Italy) Cagliari Primavera | 2014 | 2022 | 105 | 7 | |
| 20 | Simone Padoin | (Italy) | CM / LB / RB | 18 March 1984 (aged 35) | (Italy) Juventus | 2016 | 2019 | 98 | 2 | |
| 21 | Artur Ioniță | (Moldova) | CM / AM | 17 August 1990 (aged 28) | (Italy) Hellas Verona | 2016 | 2021 | 91 | 6 | |
| 24 | Paolo Faragò | (Italy) | CM / RM / RB | 12 February 1993 (aged 26) | (Italy) Novara | 2017 | 2022 | 70 | 3 | |
| 27 | Alessandro Deiola | (Italy) | CM | 1 August 1995 (aged 23) | (Italy) Cagliari Primavera | 2014 | 2022 | 49 | 2 | |
| 29 | Lucas Castro | (Argentina) | AM / LW | 9 April 1989 (aged 30) | (Italy) Chievo | 2018 | 2021 | 12 | 1 | |
Forwards
| 9 | Alberto Cerri | (Italy) | ST | 16 April 1996 (aged 23) | (Italy) Juventus | 2018 | 2019 | 15 | 0 | Loan |
| 30 | Leonardo Pavoletti | (Italy) | ST | 26 November 1988 (aged 30) | (Italy) Napoli | 2017 | 2022 | 65 | 27 | |
| 32 | Kiril Despodov | (Bulgaria) | RW / LW / SS | 11 November 1996 (aged 22) | (Bulgaria) CSKA Sofia | 2019 | 2023 | 4 | 0 | |
| 36 | Riccardo Doratiotto | (Italy) | LW / RW / AM | 7 June 1999 (aged 20) | (Italy) Cagliari Primavera | 2019 | | 1 | 0 | |
| 37 | Francesco Verde | (Italy) | CF / SS / LW | 16 August 1999 (aged 19) | (Italy) Cagliari Primavera | 2019 | | 1 | 0 | |
| 77 | Cyril Théréau | (France) | CF / ST | 24 April 1983 (aged 36) | (Italy) Fiorentina | 2019 | 2019 | 5 | 0 | Loan |
Players transferred during the season
| 2 | Marko Pajač | (Croatia) | LM / CM | 11 May 1993 (aged 26) | (Slovenia) Celje | 2016 | 2021 | 4 | 0 | |
| 3 | Marco Andreolli | (Italy) | CB | 10 June 1986 (aged 33) | (Italy) Internazionale | 2017 | 2019 | 26 | 0 | |
| 4 | Daniele Dessena | (Italy) | CM | 10 May 1987 (aged 32) | (Italy) Sampdoria | 2012 | 2019 | 166 | 7 | Captain |
| 17 | Diego Farias | (Brazil) | SS | 10 May 1990 (aged 29) | (Italy) Chievo | 2014 | 2021 | 127 | 31 | |
| 25 | Marco Sau | (Italy) | ST / SS | 3 November 1987 (aged 31) | (Italy) Cagliari Primavera | 2007 | 2019 | 194 | 45 | Vice-captain |

== Transfers ==
=== In ===
| Date | Pos. | Player | Age | Moving from | Fee | Notes | Source |
|---|---|---|---|---|---|---|---|
| 22 June 2018 | DF | (Croatia) Darijo Srna | 36 | (Ukraine) Shakhtar Donetsk | Free | | |
| 30 June 2018 | MF | (Argentina) Lucas Castro | 29 | (Italy) Chievo | €6.5M | | |
| 1 July 2018 | DF | (Italy) Marco Capuano | 26 | (Italy) Crotone | Free | Loan return | |
| 1 July 2018 | MF | (Argentina) Santiago Colombatto | 21 | (Italy) Perugia | Free | Loan return | |
| 1 July 2018 | FW | (Italy) Federico Melchiorri | 31 | (Italy) Carpi | Free | Loan return | |
| 1 July 2018 | MF | (Croatia) Marko Pajač | 25 | (Italy) Perugia | Free | Loan return | |
| 9 January 2019 | MF | (Slovenia) Valter Birsa | 32 | (Italy) Chievo | €2M | | |

==== Loans in ====
| Date | Pos. | Player | Age | Moving from | Fee | Notes | Source |
|---|---|---|---|---|---|---|---|
| 12 July 2018 | FW | (Italy) Alberto Cerri | 22 | (Italy) Juventus | Loan | Loan with an obligation to buy | |

=== Out ===
| Date | Pos. | Player | Age | Moving to | Fee | Notes | Source |
|---|---|---|---|---|---|---|---|
| 20 June 2018 | DF | (Poland) Bartosz Salamon | 27 | (Italy) SPAL | Undisclosed | Option to buy exercised | |
| 1 July 2018 | DF | (Brazil) Leandro Castán | 31 | (Italy) Roma | Free | Loan return | |
| 10 January 2019 | MF | (Italy) Daniele Dessena | 31 | (Italy) Brescia | €600,000 | | |

==== Loans out ====
| Date | Pos. | Player | Age | Moving to | Fee | Notes | Source |

== Pre-season and friendlies ==
| 8 July 2018 Friendly | Rappresentativa Barbagia | 0–9 | Cagliari | Aritzo, Sardinia, Italy |
| 17:30 CEST (UTC+2) | | Report | Pavoletti 4'; Farias 17'; Dessena 30'; Han 46'; Ragatzu 58'; Caligara 77', 88'; Deiola 78'; Sau 78' | Stadium: Stadio del Vento; Referee: Usala |

| 17 July 2018 Friendly | Rotaliana | 0–9 | Cagliari | Pejo, Italy |
| 17:30 CEST (UTC+2) | | Report | Capuano 4'; Pavoletti 8', 21', 36'; Cigarini 14'; Sau 44'; Castro 67'; Farias 76', 88'; Deiola 84' | Stadium: Campo Comunale di Celledizzo; Referee: Usala |

| 18 July 2018 Friendly | Cagliari | 10–0 | Real Vicenza | Pejo, Italy |
| 19:00 CEST (UTC+2) | Han 14', 36'; Farias 26', 55'; Deiola 31'; Faragò 37'; Castro 42'; Barella 61'; Ioniță 74'; Pavoletti 36' | Report | | Stadium: Campo Comunale di Celledizzo |

| 22 July 2018 Friendly | Cagliari | 3–0 | Virtus Bolzano | Pejo, Italy |
| 17:30 CEST (UTC+2) | Pavoletti 56'; Farias 63', 70' | Report | | Stadium: Campo Comunale di Celledizzo |

| 26 July 2018 Friendly | Cagliari | 1–0 | Cremonese | Cles, Italy |
| 17:30 CEST (UTC+2) | Sau 90+3' | Report | | Referee: Bergamin |

| 1 August 2018 Friendly | Fenerbahçe | 2–1 | Cagliari | Istanbul, Turkey |
| 20:00 CEST (UTC+2) | Alper 51', 57' | Report | Sau 90+3' | Stadium: Şükrü Saracoğlu Stadium |

| 4 August 2018 Friendly | Trabzonspor | 0–0 | Cagliari | Istanbul, Turkey |
| 20:00 CEST (UTC+2) | | Report | | Stadium: Atatürk Olympic Stadium |

| 8 August 2018 Friendly | Cagliari | 0–1 | Atlético Madrid | Cagliari, Italy |
| 20:00 CEST (UTC+2) | Borja Bastón 32' | Report | | Stadium: Sardegna Arena; Referee: Maurizio Mariani |

| 6 September 2018 Trofeo Nieddittas | Cagliari | 1–0 | Olbia | Terralba, Italy |
| 20:00 CEST (UTC+2) | Lucas Castro 45' | Report | | Stadium: Centro Sportivo Remigio Corda |

| 13 October 2018 Friendly | Oristanese | 0–12 | Cagliari | Tharros, Sardinia, Italy |
| | | Report | Dessena 5', 80'; Cerri 10', 38', 50'; João Pedro 32'; Castro 62', 74', 77'; Pavoletti 69', 82'; Tuveri 75' (o.g.) | Stadium: Campo Tharros; Attendance: 1500 |

| 21 May 2019 IV Trofeo Sardegna | Cagliari | 1–0 | Olbia | Macomer, Sardinia, Italy |
| 17:30 CEST (UTC+2) | João Pedro 17' | Report | | Stadium: Stadio Scalarba; Referee: Collu |

== Competitions ==
=== Serie A ===
==== League table ====
| Pos | Team | Pld | W | D | L | GF | GA | GD | Pts |
|---|---|---|---|---|---|---|---|---|---|
| 13 | SPAL | 38 | 11 | 9 | 18 | 44 | 56 | −12 | 42 |
| 14 | Parma | 38 | 10 | 11 | 17 | 41 | 61 | −20 | 41 (Note: Positions determined by head-to-head points: Parma: 9 pts; Cagliari: 7 pts; Fiorentina: 1 pt.) |
| 15 | Cagliari | 38 | 10 | 11 | 17 | 36 | 54 | −18 | 41 |
| 16 | Fiorentina | 38 | 8 | 17 | 13 | 47 | 45 | +2 | 41 |
| 17 | Genoa | 38 | 8 | 14 | 16 | 39 | 57 | −18 | 38 (Note: Genoa finished ahead of Empoli on head-to-head points: Genoa 2–1 Empoli, Empoli 1–3 Genoa.) |

Source: Serie A, Soccerway
Rules for classification: 1) Points; 2) Head-to-head points; 3) Head-to-head goal difference; 4) Goal difference; 5) Goals scored; 6) Draw. (Note: Head-to-head record is used only after all the matches between the teams in question have been played).

==== Results summary ====
| Overall | | | | | | | | Home | | | | | | Away | | | | | |
| Pld | W | D | L | GF | GA | GD | Pts | W | D | L | GF | GA | GD | W | D | L | GF | GA | GD |
|---|---|---|---|---|---|---|---|---|---|---|---|---|---|---|---|---|---|---|---|
| 38 | 10 | 11 | 17 | 36 | 54 | −18 | 41 | 8 | 6 | 5 | 23 | 20 | +3 | 2 | 5 | 12 | 13 | 34 | −21 |

Last updated: 26 May 2019.
Source: Competitive matches

==== Results by round ====
| Round | 1 | 2 | 3 | 4 | 5 | 6 | 7 | 8 | 9 | 10 | 11 | 12 | 13 | 14 | 15 | 16 | 17 | 18 | 19 | 20 | 21 | 22 | 23 | 24 | 25 | 26 | 27 | 28 | 29 | 30 | 31 | 32 | 33 | 34 | 35 | 36 | 37 | 38 |
|---|---|---|---|---|---|---|---|---|---|---|---|---|---|---|---|---|---|---|---|---|---|---|---|---|---|---|---|---|---|---|---|---|---|---|---|---|---|---|
| Ground | A | H | A | H | A | H | A | H | A | H | A | A | H | A | H | H | A | H | A | H | A | H | A | H | A | H | A | H | A | H | H | A | H | A | A | H | A | H |
| Result | L | D | W | D | L | D | L | W | D | W | L | D | D | D | D | L | L | W | L | D | L | L | L | W | L | W | L | W | W | L | W | D | W | L | L | L | D | L |
| Position | 19 | 15 | 12 | 12 | 16 | 16 | 17 | 13 | 14 | 12 | 14 | 13 | 13 | 13 | 13 | 13 | 14 | 13 | 13 | 13 | 14 | 15 | 15 | 14 | 14 | 14 | 14 | 14 | 12 | 14 | 12 | 12 | 10 | 11 | 12 | 12 | 13 | 15 |

Updated to match(es) played on 26 May 2019. Source: Competitive matches
A = Away; H = Home; W = Win; D = Draw; L = Loss

==== Matches ====
| 19 August 2018 1 | Empoli | 2–0 | Cagliari | Empoli |
| 20:30 CEST (UTC+02:00) | Krunić 14'; Antonelli (yellow card) 28'; Caputo 51'; Capezzi (yellow card) 66'; Rasmussen (yellow card) 90' | Report | Romagna (yellow card) 44'; Barella (yellow card) 76'; Pisacane (yellow card) 90+2' | Stadium: Stadio Carlo Castellani; Attendance: 7,335; Referee: Daniele Chiffi |

| 26 August 2018 2 | Cagliari | 2–2 | Sassuolo | Cagliari |
| 20:30 CEST (UTC+02:00) | Pavoletti 10', 73'; Barella (yellow card) 34'; Cigarini (yellow card) 61'; Ioniță (yellow card) 69'; Romagna (yellow card) 90+9' | Report | Locatelli (yellow card) 33'; Berardi 53'; Marlon (yellow card) 63' (yellow-red card) 90+2'; Boateng (yellow card) 74', (goal) 90+9' (pen.) | Stadium: Sardegna Arena; Attendance: 14,432; Referee: Luca Pairetto |

| 2 September 2018 3 | Atalanta | 0–1 | Cagliari | Bergamo |
| 20:30 CEST (UTC+02:00) | Djimsiti (yellow card) 44'; De Roon (yellow card) 47' | Report | Barella 45'; Ioniță (yellow card) 52'; Dessena (yellow card) 82' | Stadium: Stadio Atleti Azzurri d'Italia; Attendance: 17,709; Referee: Fabio Maresca |

| 16 September 2018 4 | Cagliari | 1–1 | Milan | Cagliari |
| 20:30 CEST (UTC+02:00) | João Pedro 4'; Srna (yellow card) 71' | Report | Higuaín 55'; Kessié (yellow card) 90+1' | Stadium: Sardegna Arena; Attendance: 16,201; Referee: Rosario Abisso |

| 22 September 2018 5 | Parma | 2–0 | Cagliari | Parma |
| 15:00 CEST (UTC+02:00) | Inglese 20'; Gagliolo (yellow card) 32'; Gervinho 47'; Barillà (yellow card) 69' | Report | Sau (yellow card) 34' | Stadium: Stadio Ennio Tardini; Attendance: 14,852; Referee: Gianpaolo Calvarese |

| 26 September 2018 6 | Cagliari | 0–0 | Sampdoria | Cagliari |
| 21:00 CEST (UTC+02:00) | Cigarini (yellow card) 22' | Report | Bereszyński (yellow card) 30'; Ramírez (yellow card) 59'; Praet (yellow card) 76' | Stadium: Sardegna Arena; Attendance: 14,038; Referee: Gianluca Rocchi |

| 29 September 2018 7 | Internazionale | 2–0 | Cagliari | Milan |
| 20:30 CEST (UTC+02:00) | Martínez 12'; Dalbert (yellow card) 86'; Politano 89' | Report | Andreolli (yellow card) 44'; Bradarić (yellow card) 49'; Pisacane (yellow card) 56'; Dessena (yellow card) 73' | Stadium: San Siro; Attendance: 55,486; Referee: Davide Massa |

| 6 October 2018 8 | Cagliari | 2–0 | Bologna | Cagliari |
| 15:00 CEST (UTC+02:00) | João Pedro 22'; Pisacane (yellow card) 25'; Dessena (yellow card) 67'; Pavoletti 68' | Report | De Maio (yellow card) 14'; Dijks (yellow card) 35'; Okwonkwo (yellow card) 67'; Santander (yellow card) 90' | Stadium: Sardegna Arena; Attendance: 15,019; Referee: Fabrizio Pasqua |

| 21 October 2018 9 | Fiorentina | 1–1 | Cagliari | Florence |
| 18:00 CEST (UTC+02:00) | Veretout 60' (pen.) | Report | Ioniță (yellow card) 41'; Barella (yellow card) 59'; Pavoletti 69' | Stadium: Stadio Artemio Franchi; Attendance: 31,567; Referee: Piero Giacomelli |

| 28 October 2018 10 | Cagliari | 2–1 | Chievo | Cagliari |
| 15:00 CET (UTC+01:00) | Pavoletti 15'; Castro 59'; Cerri (yellow card) 90' | Report | Giaccherini (yellow card) 28'; Rossettini (yellow card) 41'; Rigoni (yellow card) 56'; Meggiorini (yellow card) 63'; Stępiński 79', (yellow card) 90+2'; Kiyine (yellow card) 84' | Stadium: Sardegna Arena; Attendance: 15,805; Referee: Marco Piccinini |

| 3 November 2018 11 | Juventus | 3–1 | Cagliari | Turin |
| 20:30 CET (UTC+01:00) | Dybala 1'; Bradarić 38' (o.g.); Matuidi (yellow card) 75'; Cuadrado 87' | Report | Bradarić (yellow card) 32'; João Pedro 36'; Pavoletti (yellow card) 49'; Pisacane (yellow card) 63' | Stadium: Allianz Stadium; Attendance: 40,644; Referee: Maurizio Mariani |

| 10 November 2018 12 | SPAL | 2–2 | Cagliari | Ferrara |
| 20:30 CET (UTC+01:00) | Petagna 3'; Valdifiori (yellow card) 34'; Felipe (yellow card) 43'; Antenucci 71' | Report | Barella (yellow card) 8'; Castro (yellow card) 17'; Pavoletti 73'; Ioniță 76', (yellow card) 90+5'; Sau (yellow card) 90' | Stadium: Stadio Paolo Mazza; Attendance: 13,250; Referee: Daniele Doveri |

| 26 November 2018 13 | Cagliari | 0–0 | Torino | Cagliari |
| 20:30 CET (UTC+01:00) | João Pedro (yellow card) 64'; Ceppitelli (yellow card) 77' | Report | | Stadium: Sardegna Arena; Attendance: 15,804; Referee: Fabrizio Pasqua |

| 2 December 2018 14 | Frosinone | 1–1 | Cagliari | Frosinone |
| 15:00 CET (UTC+01:00) | Cassata 14', (yellow card) 32' | Report | Ceppetelli (yellow card) 34'; Bradarić (yellow card) 37'; Srna (yellow card) 40'; Barella (yellow card) 54' (yellow-red card) 85'; Pavoletti (yellow card) 60'; Farias 77', (yellow card) 90+2' | Stadium: Stadio Benito Stirpe; Attendance: 12,377; Referee: Marco Serra |

| 8 December 2018 15 | Cagliari | 2–2 | Roma | Cagliari |
| 18:00 CET (UTC+01:00) | Faragò (yellow card) 64'; Ioniță 84'; Srna (yellow card) 90+4' (red card) 90+4'; Ceppitelli (yellow card) 90+4' (red card) 90+4'; Sau 90+5', (yellow card) 90+6' | Report | Cristante 14', (yellow card) 47'; Kolarov 41' | Stadium: Sardegna Arena; Attendance: 14,938; Referee: Paolo Mazzoleni |

| 16 December 2018 16 | Cagliari | 0–1 | Napoli | Cagliari |
| 18:00 CET (UTC+01:00) | Padoin (yellow card) 48'; Sau (yellow card) 89' | Report | Maksimović (yellow card) 72'; Insigne (yellow card) 79'; Milik 90+1' | Stadium: Sardegna Arena; Attendance: 15,081; Referee: Daniele Doveri |

| 22 December 2018 17 | Lazio | 3–1 | Cagliari | Rome |
| 12:30 CET (UTC+01:00) | Milinković-Savić 12'; Acerbi 23'; Lulić 67'; Bastos (yellow card) 90+2'; Immobile (yellow card) 90+5' | Report | Faragò (yellow card) 59'; João Pedro 90+3' (pen.) | Stadium: Stadio Olimpico; Attendance: 30,000; Referee: Gianluca Manganiello |

| 26 December 2018 18 | Cagliari | 1–0 | Genoa | Cagliari |
| 15:00 CET (UTC+01:00) | Farias 45+3', (yellow card) 45+3'; Faragò (yellow card) 65'; Cigarini (yellow card) 75' | Report | Romero (yellow card) 1'; Rolón (yellow card) 41'; Piątek (yellow card) 82' | Stadium: Sardegna Arena; Attendance: 15,777; Referee: Daniele Orsato |

| 29 December 2018 19 | Udinese | 2–0 | Cagliari | Udine |
| 15:00 CET (UTC+01:00) | Nuytinck (yellow card) 26'; Pussetto 39', (yellow card) 67'; Stryger Larsen (yellow card) 45'; Behrami 57'; Mandragora (red card) 79' | Report | Farias (yellow card) 45'; Ceppitelli (red card) 51'; Bradarić (yellow card) 85' | Stadium: Dacia Arena; Attendance: 17,918; Referee: Maurizio Mariani |

| 20 January 2019 20 | Cagliari | 2–2 | Empoli | Cagliari |
| 18:00 CET (UTC+01:00) | Pavoletti 36'; Farias 90+1' | Report | Di Lorenzo 70'; Zajc 81' | Stadium: Sardegna Arena; Attendance: 13,836; Referee: Fabrizio Pasqua |

| 26 January 2019 21 | Sassuolo | 3–0 | Cagliari | Reggio Emilia |
| 15:00 CET (UTC+01:00) | Locatelli 9'; Peluso (yellow card) 25'; Babacar 45+4' (pen.); Matri 87' | Report | Barella (yellow card) 14' | Stadium: Mapei Stadium – Città del Tricolore; Attendance: 9,970; Referee: Massimiliano Irrati |

| 4 February 2019 22 | Cagliari | 0–1 | Atalanta | Cagliari |
| 21:00 CET (UTC+01:00) | | Report | Hateboer 50'; Pašalić (yellow card) 86'; Berisha (yellow card) 90+4' | Stadium: Sardegna Arena; Attendance: 14,821; Referee: Paolo Valeri |

| 10 February 2019 23 | Milan | 3–0 | Cagliari | Milan |
| 20:30 CET (UTC+01:00) | Ceppitelli 13' (o.g.); Paquetá 22'; Piątek 62' | Report | Faragò (yellow card) 75' | Stadium: San Siro; Attendance: 45,576; Referee: Federico La Penna |

| 16 February 2019 24 | Cagliari | 2–1 | Parma | Cagliari |
| 18:00 CET (UTC+01:00) | Cigarini (yellow card) 36'; Deiola (yellow card) 52'; Pavoletti 66', 85', (yellow card) 78'; João Pedro (yellow card) 90' (yellow-red card) 90' | Report | Kucka 40'; Bastoni (yellow card) 46' | Stadium: Sardegna Arena; Attendance: 16,119; Referee: Gianluca Manganiello |

| 24 February 2019 25 | Sampdoria | 1–0 | Cagliari | Genoa |
| 12:30 CET (UTC+01:00) | Ekdal (yellow card) 18'; Quagliarella 68' (pen.) | Report | Deiola (yellow card) 33'; Pellegrini (yellow card) 64' | Stadium: Stadio Luigi Ferraris; Attendance: 18,840; Referee: Luca Massimi |

| 1 March 2019 26 | Cagliari | 2–1 | Internazionale | Cagliari |
| 20:30 CET (UTC+01:00) | Cigarini (yellow card) 8'; João Pedro (yellow card) 20'; Perišić 31' (o.g.); Pavoletti 43', (yellow card) 79'; Faragò (yellow card) 76'; Cragno (yellow card) 90+5' | Report | Škriniar (yellow card) 29'; Martínez 38'; Vecino (yellow card) 66'; Brozović (yellow card) 71' | Stadium: Sardegna Arena; Attendance: 16,223; Referee: Luca Banti |

| 10 March 2019 27 | Bologna | 2–0 | Cagliari | Bologna |
| 12:30 CET (UTC+01:00) | Pulgar 34' (pen.); Džemaili (yellow card) 52'; Soriano 77' | Report | Bradarić (yellow card) 51'; Barella (yellow card) 52'; Srna (yellow card) 57'; Pellegrini (yellow card) 70' | Stadium: Stadio Renato Dall'Ara; Attendance: 20,557; Referee: Massimiliano Irrati |

| 15 March 2019 28 | Cagliari | 2–1 | Fiorentina | Cagliari |
| 20:30 CET (UTC+01:00) | Cigarini (yellow card) 34'; Ceppitelli (yellow card) 44', (goal) 66'; João Pedro 52'; Pavoletti (yellow card) 76' | Report | Chiesa (yellow card) 42', (goal) 88'; Pezzella (yellow card) 90+3' | Stadium: Sardegna Arena; Attendance: 14,735; Referee: Daniele Doveri |

| 29 March 2019 29 | Chievo | 0–3 | Cagliari | Verona |
| 20:30 CET (UTC+01:00) | Depaoli (yellow card) 22' (yellow-red card) 52'; Léris (yellow card) 59'; Meggiorini (yellow card) 62'; Bani (yellow card) 71'; Giaccherini (yellow card) 87' | Report | Pisacane 16'; João Pedro 33'; Ioniță 43'; Faragò (yellow card) 54'; Cerri (yellow card) 72'; Cigarini (yellow card) 87' | Stadium: Stadio Marc'Antonio Bentegodi; Attendance: 10,000; Referee: Rosario Abisso |

| 2 April 2019 30 | Cagliari | 0–2 | Juventus | Cagliari |
| 21:00 CEST (UTC+02:00) | João Pedro (yellow card) 34'; Lykogiannis (yellow card) 39'; Srna (yellow card) 82' | Report | Kean (yellow card) 20', (goal) 85'; Bonucci 22'; Bernardeschi (yellow card) 90+3' | Stadium: Sardegna Arena; Attendance: 15,985; Referee: Piero Giacomelli |

| 7 April 2019 31 | Cagliari | 2–1 | SPAL | Cagliari |
| 15:00 CEST (UTC+02:00) | Faragò 3'; Ceppitelli (yellow card) 18'; Cigarini (yellow card) 31'; Pavoletti 60', (yellow card) 68'; Cacciatore (yellow card) 90+1' | Report | Antenucci 18' (pen.); Dickmann (yellow card) 25'; Felipe (yellow card) 56'; Fares (yellow card) 59' | Stadium: Sardegna Arena; Attendance: 16,121; Referee: Luca Banti |

| 14 April 2019 32 | Torino | 1–1 | Cagliari | Turin |
| 12:30 CEST (UTC+02:00) | Rincón (yellow card) 2'; Berenguer (yellow card) 45'; Zaza 52', (red card) 73' | Report | Barella (yellow card) 1' (yellow-red card) 90+5'; Faragò (yellow card) 20'; Padoin (yellow card) 45+2'; Pellegrini (yellow card) 51' (yellow-red card) 82'; Pisacane (yellow card) 57'; Pavoletti 78' | Stadium: Stadio Olimpico Grande Torino; Attendance: 23,869; Referee: Massimiliano Irrati |

| 20 April 2019 33 | Cagliari | 1–0 | Frosinone | Cagliari |
| 15:00 CEST (UTC+02:00) | João Pedro 27' (pen.), (yellow card) 82'; Faragò (yellow card) 57' (yellow-red card) 79' | Report | Ciano (yellow card) 90+2' | Stadium: Sardegna Arena; Attendance: 16,095; Referee: Rosario Abisso |

| 27 April 2019 34 | Roma | 3–0 | Cagliari | Rome |
| 18:00 CEST (UTC+02:00) | Fazio 5'; Pastore 8'; Kolarov 86'; Manolas (yellow card) 88' | Report | Ceppitelli (yellow card) 36'; Pisacane (yellow card) 61' | Stadium: Stadio Olimpico; Attendance: 35,964; Referee: Gianluca Manganiello |

| 5 May 2019 35 | Napoli | 2–1 | Cagliari | Naples |
| 20:30 CEST (UTC+02:00) | Younes (yellow card) 61'; Mertens 85'; Insigne 90+8' (pen.), (yellow card) 90+8' | Report | Pavoletti 63'; Cerri (yellow card) 72'; Cigarini (yellow card) 90+7'; Ioniță (red card) 90+7'; Barella (yellow card) 90+11' | Stadium: Stadio San Paolo; Attendance: 16,171; Referee: Daniele Chiffi |

| 11 May 2019 36 | Cagliari | 1–2 | Lazio | Cagliari |
| 18:00 CEST (UTC+02:00) | Barella (yellow card) 85'; Pavoletti 90+1'; Cacciatore (yellow card) 90+4' | Report | Radu (yellow card) 14'; Badelj (yellow card) 26'; Luis Alberto 31'; Correa 53'; Proto (yellow card) 64'; Luiz Felipe (yellow card) 90+4' | Stadium: Sardegna Arena; Attendance: 16,179; Referee: Michael Fabbri |

| 18 May 2019 37 | Genoa | 1–1 | Cagliari | Genoa |
| 18:00 CEST (UTC+02:00) | Criscito (yellow card) 31', (goal) 89' (pen.); Veloso (yellow card) 77'; Pezzella (red card) 90+3' | Report | Klavan (yellow card) 22'; Pavoletti 40' | Stadium: Stadio Luigi Ferraris; Attendance: 22,768; Referee: Paolo Valeri |

| 26 May 2019 38 | Cagliari | 1–2 | Udinese | Cagliari |
| 20:30 CEST (UTC+02:00) | Pavoletti 17'; Srna (yellow card) 64'; Klavan (yellow card) 84' | Report | Hallfreðsson 59'; De Maio 69'; Musso (yellow card) 84'; Wilmot (yellow card) 88' | Stadium: Sardegna Arena; Attendance: 15,378; Referee: Manuel Volpi |

=== Coppa Italia ===
| 12 August 2018 Third round | Cagliari | 2–1 | Palermo | Cagliari |
| 20:30 CEST (UTC+02:00) | Pavoletti 31', 73'; Cigarini (yellow card) 42' | Report | Rajković (yellow card) 38'; Nestorovski 52' (pen.); Murawski (yellow card) 64' | Stadium: Sardegna Arena; Attendance: 10,201; Referee: Paolo Valeri |

| 5 December 2018 Fourth round | Chievo | 1–2 | Cagliari | Verona |
| 20:45 CET (UTC+01:00) | Léris 18'; Rigoni (yellow card) 34'; Cesar (yellow card) 79'; Rossettini (yellow card) 90+1' | Report | Cerri 8'; Farias (yellow card) 35'; Pisacane 68' | Stadium: Stadio Marc'Antonio Bentegodi; Attendance: 1,000; Referee: Luigi Nasca |

| 14 January 2019 Round of 16 | Cagliari | 0–2 | Atalanta | Cagliari |
| 17:30 CET (UTC+01:00) | Cigarini (yellow card) 21'; Faragò (yellow card) 57' | Report | Freuler (yellow card) 45+2'; Toloi (yellow card) 75'; Djimsiti (yellow card) 81'; Zapata 88'; Pašalić 90+3' | Stadium: Sardegna Arena; Attendance: 10,119; Referee: Marco Piccinini |

== Statistics ==
=== Appearances and goals ===
| No. | Pos | Nat | Player | Total | | Serie A | | Coppa Italia | |
| No. | Pos | Nat | Player | Apps | Goals | Apps | Goals | Apps | Goals |
Goalkeepers
| 1 | GK | (Brazil) BRA | Rafael | 1 | 0 | 0 | 0 | 1 | 0 |
| 16 | GK | (Italy) ITA | Simone Aresti | 0 | 0 | 0 | 0 | 0 | 0 |
| 28 | GK | (Italy) ITA | Alessio Cragno | 40 | 0 | 38 | 0 | 2 | 0 |
Defenders
| 3 | DF | (Italy) ITA | Luca Pellegrini | 12 | 0 | 11+1 | 0 | 0 | 0 |
| 12 | DF | (Italy) ITA | Fabrizio Cacciatore | 7 | 0 | 7 | 0 | 0 | 0 |
| 15 | DF | (Estonia) EST | Ragnar Klavan | 15 | 0 | 15 | 0 | 0 | 0 |
| 19 | DF | (Italy) ITA | Fabio Pisacane | 28 | 2 | 24+3 | 1 | 1 | 1 |
| 22 | DF | (Greece) GRE | Charalambos Lykogiannis | 12 | 0 | 9+2 | 0 | 1 | 0 |
| 23 | DF | (Italy) ITA | Luca Ceppitelli | 26 | 1 | 24 | 1 | 2 | 0 |
| 33 | DF | (Croatia) CRO | Darijo Srna | 28 | 0 | 24+2 | 0 | 1+1 | 0 |
| 56 | DF | (Italy) ITA | Filippo Romagna | 21 | 0 | 16+2 | 0 | 3 | 0 |
Midfielders
| 6 | MF | (Croatia) CRO | Filip Bradarić | 29 | 0 | 17+10 | 0 | 0+2 | 0 |
| 8 | MF | (Italy) ITA | Luca Cigarini | 28 | 0 | 20+5 | 0 | 3 | 0 |
| 10 | MF | (Brazil) BRA | João Pedro | 37 | 7 | 31+4 | 7 | 1+1 | 0 |
| 14 | MF | (Slovenia) SVN | Valter Birsa | 13 | 0 | 4+8 | 0 | 0+1 | 0 |
| 18 | MF | (Italy) ITA | Nicolò Barella | 38 | 1 | 35 | 1 | 3 | 0 |
| 20 | MF | (Italy) ITA | Simone Padoin | 32 | 0 | 22+8 | 0 | 1+1 | 0 |
| 21 | MF | (Moldova) MDA | Artur Ioniță | 39 | 3 | 34+3 | 3 | 2 | 0 |
| 24 | MF | (Italy) ITA | Paolo Faragò | 29 | 1 | 17+9 | 1 | 3 | 0 |
| 27 | MF | (Italy) ITA | Alessandro Deiola | 10 | 0 | 5+5 | 0 | 0 | 0 |
| 29 | MF | (Argentina) ARG | Lucas Castro | 13 | 1 | 10+2 | 1 | 1 | 0 |
Forwards
| 9 | FW | (Italy) ITA | Alberto Cerri | 17 | 1 | 7+8 | 0 | 1+1 | 1 |
| 30 | FW | (Italy) ITA | Leonardo Pavoletti | 34 | 18 | 31+1 | 16 | 2 | 2 |
| 32 | FW | (Bulgaria) BUL | Kiril Despodov | 5 | 0 | 1+4 | 0 | 0 | 0 |
| 36 | FW | (Italy) ITA | Riccardo Doratiotto | 1 | 0 | 1 | 0 | 0 | 0 |
| 37 | FW | (Italy) ITA | Francesco Verde | 1 | 0 | 0+1 | 0 | 0 | 0 |
| 77 | FW | (France) FRA | Cyril Théréau | 5 | 0 | 1+4 | 0 | 0 | 0 |
Players transferred out during the season
| 2 | MF | (Croatia) CRO | Marko Pajač | 4 | 0 | 0+3 | 0 | 1 | 0 |
| 3 | DF | (Italy) ITA | Marco Andreolli | 4 | 0 | 1+2 | 0 | 1 | 0 |
| 4 | MF | (Italy) ITA | Daniele Dessena | 12 | 0 | 3+8 | 0 | 1 | 0 |
| 17 | FW | (Brazil) BRA | Diego Farias | 19 | 3 | 7+9 | 3 | 2+1 | 0 |
| 25 | FW | (Italy) ITA | Marco Sau | 15 | 1 | 5+9 | 1 | 0+1 | 0 |

Last updated: 26 May 2019
Source: Competitions

=== Goalscorers ===
| Rank | No. | Pos | Nat | Name | Serie A | Coppa Italia | Total |
|---|---|---|---|---|---|---|---|
| 1 | 30 | FW | (Italy) | Leonardo Pavoletti | 16 | 2 | 18 |
| 2 | 10 | MF | (Brazil) | João Pedro | 7 | 0 | 7 |
| 3 | 17 | FW | (Brazil) | Diego Farias | 3 | 0 | 3 |
| 3 | 21 | MF | (Moldova) | Artur Ioniță | 3 | 0 | 3 |
| 5 | 19 | DF | (Italy) | Fabio Pisacane | 1 | 1 | 2 |
| 6 | 9 | FW | (Italy) | Alberto Cerri | 0 | 1 | 1 |
| 6 | 18 | MF | (Italy) | Nicolò Barella | 1 | 0 | 1 |
| 6 | 23 | DF | (Italy) | Luca Ceppitelli | 1 | 0 | 1 |
| 6 | 24 | MF | (Italy) | Paolo Faragò | 1 | 0 | 1 |
| 6 | 25 | FW | (Italy) | Marco Sau | 1 | 0 | 1 |
| 6 | 29 | MF | (Argentina) | Lucas Castro | 1 | 0 | 1 |
| Own goal | | | | | 1 | 0 | 1 |
| Totals | | | | | 36 | 4 | 40 |

Last updated: 26 May 2019

=== Clean sheets ===
| Rank | No. | Pos | Nat | Name | Serie A | Coppa Italia | Total |
|---|---|---|---|---|---|---|---|
| 1 | 28 | GK | (Italy) | Alessio Cragno | 7 | 0 | 7 |
| Totals | | | | | 7 | 0 | 7 |

Last updated: 26 May 2019

=== Disciplinary record ===
| No. | Pos | Nat | Name | Serie A | | | Coppa Italia | | | Total | | |
| No. | Pos | Nat | Name | Booked | (yellow card) (yellow-red card) | Sent off (straight red) | Booked | (yellow card) (yellow-red card) | Sent off (straight red) | Booked | (yellow card) (yellow-red card) | Sent off (straight red) |
| 28 | GK | (Italy) | Alessio Cragno | 1 | 0 | 0 | 0 | 0 | 0 | 1 | 0 | 0 |
| 3 | DF | (Italy) | Marco Andreolli | 1 | 0 | 0 | 0 | 0 | 0 | 1 | 0 | 0 |
| 3 | DF | (Italy) | Luca Pellegrini | 2 | 1 | 0 | 0 | 0 | 0 | 2 | 1 | 0 |
| 12 | DF | (Italy) | Fabrizio Cacciatore | 2 | 0 | 0 | 0 | 0 | 0 | 2 | 0 | 0 |
| 15 | DF | (Estonia) | Ragnar Klavan | 2 | 0 | 0 | 0 | 0 | 0 | 2 | 0 | 0 |
| 19 | DF | (Italy) | Fabio Pisacane | 6 | 0 | 0 | 0 | 0 | 0 | 6 | 0 | 0 |
| 22 | DF | (Greece) | Charalambos Lykogiannis | 1 | 0 | 0 | 0 | 0 | 0 | 1 | 0 | 0 |
| 23 | DF | (Italy) | Luca Ceppitelli | 6 | 0 | 2 | 0 | 0 | 0 | 6 | 0 | 2 |
| 33 | DF | (Croatia) | Darijo Srna | 6 | 0 | 1 | 0 | 0 | 0 | 6 | 0 | 1 |
| 56 | DF | (Italy) | Filippo Romagna | 2 | 0 | 0 | 0 | 0 | 0 | 2 | 0 | 0 |
| 4 | MF | (Italy) | Daniele Dessena | 3 | 0 | 0 | 0 | 0 | 0 | 3 | 0 | 0 |
| 6 | MF | (Croatia) | Filip Bradarić | 5 | 0 | 0 | 0 | 0 | 0 | 5 | 0 | 0 |
| 8 | MF | (Italy) | Luca Cigarini | 9 | 0 | 0 | 2 | 0 | 0 | 11 | 0 | 0 |
| 10 | MF | (Brazil) | João Pedro | 4 | 1 | 0 | 0 | 0 | 0 | 4 | 1 | 0 |
| 18 | MF | (Italy) | Nicolò Barella | 8 | 2 | 0 | 0 | 0 | 0 | 8 | 2 | 0 |
| 20 | MF | (Italy) | Simone Padoin | 2 | 0 | 0 | 0 | 0 | 0 | 2 | 0 | 0 |
| 21 | MF | (Moldova) | Artur Ioniță | 4 | 0 | 1 | 0 | 0 | 0 | 4 | 0 | 1 |
| 24 | MF | (Italy) | Paolo Faragò | 7 | 1 | 0 | 1 | 0 | 0 | 8 | 1 | 0 |
| 27 | MF | (Italy) | Alessandro Deiola | 2 | 0 | 0 | 0 | 0 | 0 | 2 | 0 | 0 |
| 29 | MF | (Argentina) | Lucas Castro | 1 | 0 | 0 | 0 | 0 | 0 | 1 | 0 | 0 |
| 9 | FW | (Italy) | Alberto Cerri | 3 | 0 | 0 | 0 | 0 | 0 | 3 | 0 | 0 |
| 17 | FW | (Brazil) | Diego Farias | 3 | 0 | 0 | 1 | 0 | 0 | 4 | 0 | 0 |
| 25 | FW | (Italy) | Marco Sau | 4 | 0 | 0 | 0 | 0 | 0 | 4 | 0 | 0 |
| 30 | FW | (Italy) | Leonardo Pavoletti | 6 | 0 | 0 | 0 | 0 | 0 | 6 | 0 | 0 |
| Totals | | | | 90 | 5 | 4 | 4 | 0 | 0 | 94 | 5 | 4 |

Last updated: 26 May 2019
