= 2019–20 Cagliari Calcio season =

Cagliari
2019–20 season
- President: Tommaso Giulini
- Manager: Rolando Maran (until 3 March); Walter Zenga (from 3 March)
- Stadium: Sardegna Arena
- Serie A: 14th
- Coppa Italia: Round of 16
- Top goalscorer: League: João Pedro (18); All: João Pedro (19)
Home colours	Away colours	Third colours

The 2019–20 Cagliari Calcio season was the club's fourth season back in Serie A after being relegated at the end of the 2014–15 season. The club competed in Serie A and also competed in the Coppa Italia.

The season was coach Rolando Maran's second in charge of the club, following his departure from fellow mid-table side ChievoVerona. The pre-season marked the return of Belgian midfielder Radja Nainggolan after almost half a decade after leaving the club for Roma.

== Players ==
=== Squad information ===
As of 9 February 2020

No.	Name	Nat	Position(s)	Date of birth (age)	Signed from	Signed in	Contract ends	Apps.	Goals	Notes
Goalkeepers
1	Rafael	(Brazil)	GK	3 March 1982 (age 44)	(Italy) Hellas Verona	2016	2019	37	0	
28	Alessio Cragno	(Italy)	GK	28 June 1994 (age 32)	(Italy) Brescia	2014	2022	84	0	
90	Robin Olsen	(Sweden)	GK	8 January 1990 (age 36)	(Italy) Roma	2019	2020	15	0	Loan
Defenders
3	Federico Mattiello	(Italy)	RB / LB / RM	14 July 1995 (age 31)	(Italy) Atalanta	2019	2020	4	0	Loan
12	Fabrizio Cacciatore	(Italy)	RB / LB	8 October 1986 (age 39)	(Italy) Chievo	2019	2020	19	0	
15	Ragnar Klavan	(Estonia)	CB	30 October 1985 (age 40)	(England) Liverpool	2018	2020	35	0	
19	Fabio Pisacane	(Italy)	CB	28 January 1986 (age 40)	(Italy) Avellino	2015	2021	130	4	
22	Charalambos Lykogiannis	(Greece)	LB	22 October 1993 (age 32)	(Austria) Sturm Graz	2018	2022	30	0	
23	Luca Ceppitelli	(Italy)	CB	11 August 1989 (age 37)	(Italy) Parma	2014	2021	130	9	
33	Luca Pellegrini	(Italy)	LB / LM / CM	7 March 1999 (age 27)	(Italy) Juventus	2019	2020	18	0	Loan
40	Sebastian Walukiewicz	(Poland)	CB / DM	5 April 2000 (age 26)	(Poland) Pogoń Szczecin	2019	2023	3	0	
Midfielders
4	Radja Nainggolan	(Belgium)	AM / CM / DM	4 May 1988 (age 38)	(Italy) Internazionale	2019	2020	20	5	Loan
6	Marko Rog	(Croatia)	CM / AM	19 July 1995 (age 31)	(Italy) Napoli	2019	2024	18	1	
8	Luca Cigarini	(Italy)	DM	20 June 1986 (age 40)	(Italy) Sampdoria	2017	2020	70	2	
10	João Pedro	(Brazil)	AM	9 March 1992 (age 34)	(Portugal) Estoril Praia	2014	2023	168	51	
14	Valter Birsa	(Slovenia)	AM / RW	7 August 1986 (age 40)	(Italy) Chievo	2019	2021	14	0	
17	Christian Oliva	(Uruguay)	DM / CM	1 June 1996 (age 30)	(Uruguay) Nacional	2019	2023	10	1	
18	Nahitan Nández	(Uruguay)	CM / RM / DM	28 December 1995 (age 30)	(Argentina) Boca Juniors	2019	2024	21	1	
21	Artur Ioniță	(Moldova)	CM / AM	17 August 1990 (age 36)	(Italy) Hellas Verona	2016	2021	111	6	
24	Paolo Faragò	(Italy)	CM / RM / RB	12 February 1993 (age 33)	(Italy) Novara	2017	2022	82	4	
Forwards
9	Alberto Paloschi	(Italy)	CF	4 January 1990 (age 36)	(Italy) SPAL	2020	2020	1	0	Loan
20	Gastón Pereiro	(Uruguay)	AM / RW / LW	11 June 1995 (age 31)	(Netherlands) PSV Eindhoven	2020	2024	1	0	
26	Daniele Ragatzu	(Italy)	SS / RW / CF	21 September 1991 (age 34)	(Italy) Olbia	2018	2021	4	1	
30	Leonardo Pavoletti	(Italy)	ST	26 November 1988 (age 37)	(Italy) Napoli	2017	2022	66	27	
99	Giovanni Simeone	(Argentina)	CF	5 July 1995 (age 31)	(Italy) Fiorentina	2019	2020	22	6	Loan
Players transferred during the season
2	Simone Pinna	(Italy)	RB	17 October 1997 (age 28)	(Italy) Youth Sector	2019	2020	1	0	
9	Alberto Cerri	(Italy)	ST	16 April 1996 (age 30)	(Italy) Juventus	2018	2023	26	1	
16	Filip Bradarić	(Croatia)	DM	11 February 1992 (age 34)	(Croatia) Rijeka	2018	2023	27	0	
20	Simone Aresti	(Italy)	GK	15 March 1986 (age 40)	(Italy) Olbia	2018	2020	1	0	
25	Han Kwang-song	(North Korea)	CF / SS	11 September 1998 (age 28)	(Italy) Youth Sector	2017	2023	12	1	
27	Alessandro Deiola	(Italy)	CM	1 August 1995 (age 31)	(Italy) Cagliari Primavera	2014	2022	50	2	
29	Lucas Castro	(Argentina)	AM / LW	9 April 1989 (age 37)	(Italy) Chievo	2018	2021	27	3	
32	Kiril Despodov	(Bulgaria)	RW / LW / SS	11 November 1996 (age 29)	(Bulgaria) CSKA Sofia	2019	2023	4	0	
56	Filippo Romagna	(Italy)	CB	26 May 1997 (age 29)	(Italy) Juventus	2017	2022	41	0	

== Transfers ==
=== In ===
Date	Pos.	Player	Age	Moving from	Fee	Notes	Source
1 July 2019	DF	(Italy) Fabrizio Cacciatore	32	(Italy) Chievo	€800,000		
1 July 2019	MF	(Uruguay) Christian Oliva	23	(Uruguay) Club Nacional	€5M		
9 August 2019	MF	(Uruguay) Nahitan Nández	23	(Argentina) Boca Juniors	€18M		

==== Loans in ====
Date	Pos.	Player	Age	Moving from	Fee	Notes	Source
10 July 2019	DF	(Italy) Federico Mattiello	23	(Italy) Atalanta	N/A	On loan until June 2020	
23 July 2019	MF	(Croatia) Marko Rog	24	(Italy) Napoli	€2M	On loan until June 2020	
5 August 2019	MF	(Belgium) Radja Nainggolan	31	(Italy) Internazionale	N/A	On loan until June 2020	
19 August 2019	DF	(Italy) Luca Pellegrini	20	(Italy) Juventus	N/A	On loan until June 2020	

=== Out ===
Date	Pos.	Player	Age	Moving to	Fee	Notes	Source
1 July 2019	DF	(Italy) Matteo Cotali	22	(Italy) Chievo	Free		
1 July 2019	DF	(Croatia) Darijo Srna	37	Retired	N/A		
1 July 2019	MF	(Italy) Simone Padoin	35	Free agent	Free		
17 July 2019	FW	(Italy) Niccolò Giannetti	28	(Italy) Salernitana	Undisclosed		
21 July 2019	FW	(Italy) Alessandro Capello	23	(Italy) Venezia	Undisclosed		

==== Loans out ====
Date	Pos.	Player	Age	Moving to	Fee	Notes	Source
8 July 2019	FW	(Colombia) Damir Ceter	21	(Italy) Chievo	N/A	On loan until June 2020	
11 July 2019	MF	(Italy) Nicolò Barella	22	(Italy) Internazionale	€12M	On loan until June 2020;With option to buy for €25M	
20 July 2019	MF	(Italy) Fabrizio Caligara	19	(Italy) Venezia	N/A	On loan until June 2020	
13 August 2019	FW	(Brazil) Diego Farias	29	(Italy) Lecce	€1.5M	On loan until June 2020	
20 August 2019	DF	(Croatia) Marko Pajac	26	(Italy) Genoa	N/A	On loan until June 2020	

== Pre-season and friendlies ==
10 July 2019 Friendly	Rappresentativa Barbagia (Italy)	1–15	(Italy) Cagliari	Aritzo, Sardinia, Italy
17:30 CEST (UTC+2)	Pili 32'	Report	Cerri 1' 12' 23' 24'; João Pedro 35'; Han 45' 55' 57'; Ragatzu 62' 69' 74' 79'; Pajač 63'; Despodov 65'; Deiola 77'	Stadium: Stadio del Vento

17 July 2019 Friendly	Cagliari (Italy)	5–0	(Italy) Real Vicenza	Pejo, Italy
17:30 CEST (UTC+2)	João Pedro 15'; Despodov 16' 34'; Ragatzu 85' Pavoletti 89'	Report		Stadium: Campo Comunale di Celledizzo; Referee: Sandu

21 July 2019 Friendly	Cagliari (Italy)	1–1	(Italy) Feralpisalò	Pejo, Italy
17:30 CEST (UTC+2)	Cerri 87'	Report	Marchi 73'	Stadium: Campo Comunale di Celledizzo; Referee: Caresia

24 July 2019 Friendly	Cagliari (Italy)	2–1	(Italy) Chievo	Trento, Italy
20:30 CEST (UTC+2)	Despodov 24'; Pavoletti 81'	Report	Stępiński 44'	Stadium: Stadio Briamasco; Referee: Alessandro Prontera (Italy)

27 July 2019 Friendly	Cagliari (Italy)	1–1	(England) Leeds United	Cagliari, Sardinia, Italy
20:30 CEST (UTC+2)	Birsa 14'	Report	Hernández 49' (pen.); Phillips (red card) 85'	Stadium: Sardegna Arena; Referee: Valerio Marini (Italy)

3 August 2019 Friendly	Freiburg (Germany)	0–1	(Italy) Cagliari	Freiburg, Germany
18:30 CEST (UTC+2)		Report	João Pedro 57'	Stadium: Möslestadion; Attendance: 200; Referee: Tobias Fritsch (Germany)

3 August 2019 Friendly	Freiburg (Germany)	4–1	(Italy) Cagliari	Freiburg, Germany
21:30 CEST (UTC+2)	Höler 15', 21'; Koch 25'; Schlotterbeck 58'	Report	Cerri 5'	Stadium: Möslestadion; Referee: Ralf Brombacher (Germany)

7 August 2019 Friendly	Fenerbahçe (Turkey)	2–2	(Italy) Cagliari	Istanbul, Turkey
20:30 CEST (UTC+2)	Belözoğlu 35'; Tufan 45+1'	Report	Nainggolan (yellow card) 33'; Han Kwang-song 54'; João Pedro 63' (pen.); Cigarini (yellow card) 82'; Ioniță (yellow card) 90'; Deiola (yellow card) 90+2'	Stadium: Şükrü Saracoğlu Stadium; Referee: Mert Güzenge (Turkey)

9 August 2019 Friendly	Catania (Italy)	1–1	(Italy) Cagliari	Catania, Italy
19:30 CEST (UTC+2)	Curiale 9'	Report	João Pedro 87'	Stadium: Stadio Angelo Massimino; Referee: Daniele Rutella (Italy)

5 September 2019 Friendly	Cagliari (Italy)	4–0	(Italy) Muravera	Assemini, Sardinia, Italy
19:30 CEST (UTC+2)	Mattiello (9 st); Simeone (29 st) Cerri (7 st)	Report		Stadium: Asseminello; Referee: Piero Usala (Italy)

11 October 2019 Friendly	Cagliari (Italy)	3–1	(Poland) Pogoń Szczecin	Sardinia, Italy
20:30 CEST (UTC+2)	Simeone 73', 83', 90' (pen.)	Report	Spiridonović 5' (pen.)	Stadium: Sardegna Arena; Referee: Antonio Giua (Italy)

14 November 2019 Friendly	Cagliari (Italy)	5–0	(Italy) Cagliari Primavera	Assemini, Sardinia, Italy
17:30 CEST (UTC+2)	Nainggolan 12'; Oliva 19'; Cerri 26' 51'; Ragatzu 83'	Report		Stadium: Asseminello

7 March 2020 Friendly	Cagliari (Italy)	1–0	(Italy) Olbia	Cagliari, Sardinia, Italy
	Simeone 44'	Report		Stadium: Sardegna Arena

== Competitions ==
=== Serie A ===
==== League table ====
Pos	Team	Pld	W	D	L	GF	GA	GD	Pts
12	Bologna	38	12	11	15	52	65	−13	47
13	Udinese	38	12	9	17	37	51	−14	45 (Note: Udinese finished ahead of Cagliari on head-to-head points: Udinese 2–1 Cagliari, Cagliari 0–1 Udinese.)
14	Cagliari	38	11	12	15	52	56	−4	45
15	Sampdoria	38	12	6	20	48	65	−17	42
16	Torino	38	11	7	20	46	68	−22	40

Source: Serie A, Soccerway
Rules for classification: 1) Points; 2) Head-to-head points; 3) Head-to-head goal difference; 4) Goal difference; 5) Goals scored; 6) Draw. (Note: Head-to-head record is used only after all the matches between the teams in question have been played)

==== Results summary ====
Overall								Home						Away					
Pld	W	D	L	GF	GA	GD	Pts	W	D	L	GF	GA	GD	W	D	L	GF	GA	GD
38	11	12	15	52	56	−4	45	7	4	8	32	28	+4	4	8	7	20	28	−8

Last updated: 1 August 2020.
Source: Competitive matches

==== Results by round ====
Round	1	2	3	4	5	6	7	8	9	10	11	12	13	14	15	16	17	18	19	20	21	22	23	24	25	26	27	28	29	30	31	32	33	34	35	36	37	38
Ground	H	H	A	H	A	H	A	H	A	H	A	H	A	H	A	H	A	A	H	A	A	H	A	H	A	H	A	H	A	H	A	H	A	H	A	H	H	A
Result	L	L	W	W	W	D	D	W	D	W	W	W	D	W	D	L	L	L	L	D	D	D	L	L	L	L	W	W	D	L	D	D	L	D	L	L	W	L
Position	16	18	13	9	5	7	7	5	7	7	6	4	4	4	4	5	6	6	6	6	6	6	8	11	11	11	10	10	11	11	11	11	11	11	13	14	13	14

Updated to match(es) played on 1 August 2020. Source: Competitive matches
A = Away; H = Home; W = Win; D = Draw; L = Loss

==== Matches ====
25 August 2019 1	Cagliari	0–1	Brescia	Cagliari
20:45 CEST (UTC+02:00)	Lykogiannis (yellow card) 45+3'; Pinna (yellow card) 71'	Report	Donnarumma 54' (pen.); Ayé (yellow card) 61'; Dessena (yellow card) 74'	Stadium: Sardegna Arena; Attendance: 16,099; Referee: Eugenio Abbattista

1 September 2019 2	Cagliari	1–2	Internazionale	Cagliari
20:45 CEST (UTC+02:00)	João Pedro 50'; Nainggolan (yellow card) 60'; Ceppitelli (yellow card) 68'; Pisacane (yellow card) 71'; Ioniță (yellow card) 76'	Report	Brozović (yellow card) 21'; Martínez 25'; Asamoah (yellow card) 45'; Lukaku 72' (pen.); Ranocchia (yellow card) 86'	Stadium: Sardegna Arena; Attendance: 16,412; Referee: Fabio Maresca

15 September 2019 3	Parma	1–3	Cagliari	Parma
15:00 CEST (UTC+02:00)	Barillà 58'	Report	Ceppitelli (yellow card) 16', (goal) 23', 39'; João Pedro (yellow card) 42'; Nández (yellow card) 56'; Pellegrini (yellow card) 62'; Simeone 77'; Castro (yellow card) 86'	Stadium: Stadio Ennio Tardini; Attendance: 14,068; Referee: Fabrizio Pasqua

20 September 2019 4	Cagliari	3–1	Genoa	Cagliari
20:45 CEST (UTC+02:00)	João Pedro (yellow card) 38', (goal) 87'; Simeone 46'; Zapata 85' (o.g.)	Report	Saponara (yellow card) 73'; Kouamé 83'	Stadium: Sardegna Arena; Attendance: 14,574; Referee: Gianluca Manganiello

25 September 2019 5	Napoli	0–1	Cagliari	Naples
21:00 CEST (UTC+02:00)	Allan (yellow card) 37'; Koulibaly (red card) 89'	Report	Rog (yellow card) 30'; Castro 87'	Stadium: Stadio San Paolo; Attendance: 25,408; Referee: Marco Di Bello

29 September 2019 6	Cagliari	1–1	Hellas Verona	Cagliari
18:00 CEST (UTC+02:00)	Castro 29', (yellow card) 33'; Pellegrini (yellow card) 64'	Report	Stępiński (yellow card) 31'; Dawidowicz (yellow card) 56'; Faraoni 66'	Stadium: Sardegna Arena; Attendance: 15,846; Referee: Manuel Volpi

6 October 2019 7	Roma	1–1	Cagliari	Rome
15:00 CEST (UTC+02:00)	Ceppitelli 31' (o.g.); Kolarov (yellow card) 44'	Report	Ceppitelli (yellow card) 11'; Cigarini (yellow card) 16'; João Pedro 26' (pen.); Simeone (yellow card) 33'; Pellegrini (yellow card) 80'	Stadium: Stadio Olimpico; Attendance: 34,385; Referee: Davide Massa

20 October 2019 8	Cagliari	2–0	SPAL	Cagliari
15:00 CEST (UTC+02:00)	Nainggolan 9', (yellow card) 69'; Simeone (yellow card) 57'; Faragò 67'; Pellegrini (yellow card) 83'; Rog (yellow card) 89'	Report	Missiroli (yellow card) 47'; Tomović (yellow card) 54'; Igor (yellow card) 60'; Cionek (yellow card) 90'; Valoti (yellow card) 90+3'	Stadium: Sardegna Arena; Attendance: 15,713; Referee: Daniele Chiffi

27 October 2019 9	Torino	1–1	Cagliari	Turin
15:00 CET (UTC+01:00)	Ansaldi (yellow card) 67'; Zaza 69'; Rincón (yellow card) 90+1'	Report	Nández 40'; Nainggolan (yellow card) 56'; Ceppitelli (yellow card) 73'; Cigarini (yellow card) 78'	Stadium: Stadio Olimpico Grande Torino; Attendance: 21,213; Referee: Michael Fabbri

30 October 2019 10	Cagliari	3–2	Bologna	Cagliari
21:00 CET (UTC+01:00)	Cigarini (yellow card) 19'; João Pedro 48', 83'; Simeone 72'; Pellegrini (yellow card) 90'	Report	Santander 23' (pen.); Orsolini (yellow card) 26'; Faragò 90+1' (o.g.)	Stadium: Sardegna Arena; Attendance: 16,076; Referee: Juan Luca Sacchi

3 November 2019 11	Atalanta	0–2	Cagliari	Bergamo
12:30 CET (UTC+01:00)	Iličić (red card) 39'; Malinovskyi (yellow card) 67'; Toloi (yellow card) 70'	Report	Rog (yellow card) 15'; Lykogiannis (yellow card) 25'; Pašalić 32' (o.g.); Oliva (yellow card) 56', (goal) 58'	Stadium: Gewiss Stadium; Attendance: 18,617; Referee: Rosario Abisso

10 November 2019 12	Cagliari	5–2	Fiorentina	Cagliari
12:30 CET (UTC+01:00)	Rog 17'; Pisacane 26'; Simeone 34'; João Pedro 54'; Nainggolan 65'; Nández (yellow card) 69'	Report	Castrovilli (yellow card) 21'; Pulgar (yellow card) 42'; Vlahović 75', 87'; Sottil (yellow card) 77'	Stadium: Sardegna Arena; Attendance: 16,316; Referee: Federico La Penna

25 November 2019 13	Lecce	2–2	Cagliari	Lecce
15:00 CET (UTC+01:00)	Petriccione (yellow card) 69'; Lapadula 83' (pen.), (red card) 85'; Calderoni 90+1'; Farias (yellow card) 90+5'	Report	Lykogiannis (yellow card) 21'; João Pedro 30' (pen.); Rog (yellow card) 45+5'; Nainggolan 67'; Cacciatore (red card) 81'; Olsen (red card) 85'	Stadium: Stadio Via del Mare; Attendance: 21,435; Referee: Maurizio Mariani

2 December 2019 14	Cagliari	4–3	Sampdoria	Cagliari
20:45 CET (UTC+01:00)	Nández (yellow card) 64'; Nainggolan 69'; João Pedro 74', 76'; Faragò (yellow card) 89'; Cerri 90+6', (yellow card) 90+8'	Report	Quagliarella 38' (pen.), 70'; Ramírez 52'; Colley (yellow card) 90'	Stadium: Sardegna Arena; Attendance: 15,658; Referee: Gianluca Aureliano

8 December 2019 15	Sassuolo	2–2	Cagliari	Reggio Emilia
15:00 CET (UTC+01:00)	Berardi 7', (yellow card) 38'; Đuričić 36', (yellow card) 45'; Magnanelli (yellow card) 39'	Report	Klavan (yellow card) 33'; Pellegrini (yellow card) 36'; Rog (yellow card) 45+1'; Pisacane (yellow card) 47'; João Pedro 51'; Ragatzu 90'	Stadium: Mapei Stadium – Città del Tricolore; Attendance: 12,666; Referee: Luca Pairetto

16 December 2019 16	Cagliari	1–2	Lazio	Cagliari
20:45 CET (UTC+01:00)	Simeone 8'; Nández (yellow card) 21'; Klavan (yellow card) 32'; Ioniță (yellow card) 46'; Pisacane (yellow card) 56'	Report	Luis Alberto (yellow card) 20', (goal) 90+3'; Cataldi (yellow card) 69'; Caicedo 90+8', (yellow card) 90+9'	Stadium: Sardegna Arena; Attendance: 16,299; Referee: Fabio Maresca

21 December 2019 17	Udinese	2–1	Cagliari	Udine
15:00 CET (UTC+01:00)	De Paul 39'; Mandragora (yellow card) 63'; De Maio (yellow card) 69'; Fofana 85'; Okaka (yellow card) 89'	Report	Pisacane (yellow card) 30' (yellow-red card) 90+2'; Rog (yellow card) 54'; João Pedro 84'; Klavan (yellow card) 90+8'	Stadium: Dacia Arena; Attendance: 19,822; Referee: Marco Piccinini

6 January 2020 18	Juventus	4–0	Cagliari	Turin
15:00 CET (UTC+01:00)	Rabiot (yellow card) 41'; Ronaldo 49', 67' (pen.), 82'; Higuaín 81'	Report	João Pedro (yellow card) 48'	Stadium: Allianz Stadium; Attendance: 40,598; Referee: Piero Giacomelli

11 January 2020 19	Cagliari	0–2	Milan	Cagliari
15:00 CET (UTC+01:00)	Cigarini (yellow card) 26'; Nández (yellow card) 39'; Pellegrini (yellow card) 60'	Report	Leão 46'; Bennacer (yellow card) 61'; Ibrahimović 64'	Stadium: Sardegna Arena; Attendance: 16,412; Referee: Rosario Abisso

19 January 2020 20	Brescia	2–2	Cagliari	Brescia
15:00 CET (UTC+01:00)	Ndoj (yellow card) 18'; Torregrossa (yellow card) 22', (goal) 27', 49'; Tonali (yellow card) 51'; Balotelli (yellow card) 81' (red card) 81'	Report	João Pedro 21', 68' (pen.); Pisacane (yellow card) 26'; Nández (yellow card) 51'; Ioniță (yellow card) 88'; Pellegrini (yellow card) 89'	Stadium: Stadio Mario Rigamonti; Attendance: 12,133; Referee: Antonio Giua

26 January 2020 21	Internazionale	1–1	Cagliari	Milan
12:30 CET (UTC+01:00)	Martínez 29', (yellow card) 90+4' (red card) 90+4'; Lukaku (yellow card) 45+3'; Barella (yellow card) 61'; De Vrij (yellow card) 83'; Berni (red card) 90+5'	Report	Nainggolan 78'	Stadium: San Siro; Attendance: 70,465; Referee: Gianluca Manganiello
Note: Tommaso Berni was sent off for dissent after the end of the match.

1 February 2020 22	Cagliari	2–2	Parma	Cagliari
18:00 CET (UTC+01:00)	João Pedro 19'; Simeone 54'; Cigarini (yellow card) 69'; Nández (yellow card) 77'; Nainggolan (yellow card) 87'	Report	Darmian (yellow card) 34'; Kucka 42'; Gagliolo (yellow card) 52'; Cornelius 90+4'	Stadium: Sardegna Arena; Attendance: 16,051; Referee: Massimiliano Irrati

9 February 2020 23	Genoa	1–0	Cagliari	Genoa
15:00 CET (UTC+01:00)	Pinamonti (yellow card) 21'; Pandev 43'; Radovanović (yellow card) 82'; Sturaro (yellow card) 90+2'	Report	Cacciatore (yellow card) 16'; Simeone (yellow card) 28'; Nainggolan (yellow card) 54'; Pereiro (yellow card) 78'; Mattiello (yellow card) 79'; Nández (yellow card) 90+3'	Stadium: Stadio Luigi Ferraris; Attendance: 21,301; Referee: Gianpaolo Calvarese

16 February 2020 24	Cagliari	0–1	Napoli	Cagliari
18:00 CET (UTC+01:00)	João Pedro (yellow card) 12'; Walukiewicz (yellow card) 30'; Nández (yellow card) 74'	Report	Mertens 66'; Zieliński (yellow card) 81'	Stadium: Sardegna Arena; Attendance: 13,535; Referee: Daniele Doveri

1 March 2020 26	Cagliari	3–4	Roma	Cagliari
18:00 CET (UTC+01:00)	João Pedro 28', 89', (yellow card) 35'; Simeone (yellow card) 69'; Pereiro 75'; Pellegrini (yellow card) 80'; Ragatzu (yellow card) 90+6'	Report	Kalinić 29', 42'; Ünder (yellow card) 34'; Villar (yellow card) 55'; Kluivert 64', (yellow card) 78'; Mkhitaryan 81'; López (yellow card) 90+2'; Santon (yellow card) 90+6'	Stadium: Sardegna Arena; Attendance: 14,848; Referee: Marco Di Bello

20 June 2020 25	Hellas Verona	2–1	Cagliari	Verona
21:45 CEST (UTC+02:00)	Di Carmine 14', 26'; Badu (yellow card) 34'; Borini (red card) 35'	Report	Pereiro (yellow card) 16'; Nández (yellow card) 34'; Simeone 43'; Pisacane (yellow card) 51'; Cigarini (yellow card) 58' (yellow-red card) 70'; Ceppitelli (yellow card) 80'	Stadium: Stadio Marc'Antonio Bentegodi; Attendance: 0 Referee: Gianluca Manganiello
Note: Match was initially postponed to 11 March, then to 20 June, from its original date of 23 February due to concerns over the COVID-19 pandemic, after it was moved to 18 March to be played behind closed doors. This was the first match played since the COVID-19 pandemic lockdown in Italy.

23 June 2020 27	SPAL	0–1	Cagliari	Ferrara
19:30 CEST (UTC+02:00)	Espeto (yellow card) 11'; Bonifazi (yellow card) 45'; Valdifiori (yellow card) 76'	Report	Ioniță (yellow card) 13'; Nández (yellow card) 37'; Rog (yellow card) 40'; Simeone 90+3'	Stadium: Stadio Paolo Mazza; Attendance: 0 Referee: Rosario Abisso
Note: Match was postponed to 14 March, then to 23 June, from its original date of 7 March due to schedule shuffling to allow for previous postponements to be played due to concerns over the COVID-19 pandemic. All subsequent matches were also shuffled to allow for this accommodation. On 9 March all sports events in Italy were suspended until 3 April.

27 June 2020 28	Cagliari	4–2	Torino	Cagliari
19:30 CEST (UTC+02:00)	Nández 12'; Simeone 17'; Mattiello (yellow card) 32'; Nainggolan 46'; João Pedro 68' (pen.); Cigarini (yellow card) 76'; Carboni (yellow card) 81'	Report	Bremer 60'; Belotti 66'	Stadium: Sardegna Arena; Attendance: 0 Referee: Maurizio Mariani

1 July 2020 29	Bologna	1–1	Cagliari	Bologna
19:30 CEST (UTC+02:00)	Schouten (yellow card) 15'; Tomiyasu (yellow card) 19'; Barrow 45+3'; Dijks (yellow card) 64'	Report	Carboni (yellow card) 25'; Simeone 46'; Pellegrini (yellow card) 59'	Stadium: Stadio Renato Dall'Ara; Attendance: 0 Referee: Juan Luca Sacchi

5 July 2020 30	Cagliari	0–1	Atalanta	Cagliari
19:30 CEST (UTC+02:00)	Carboni (yellow card) 5', (red card) 26'; Pisacane (yellow card) 44'; Nández (yellow card) 70'	Report	Muriel 27' (pen.); Palomino (yellow card) 62'; Hateboer (yellow card) 71'	Stadium: Sardegna Arena; Attendance: 0 Referee: Federico La Penna

8 July 2020 31	Fiorentina	0–0	Cagliari	Florence
19:30 CEST (UTC+02:00)	Chiesa (yellow card) 9'; Duncan (yellow card) 80'	Report	Mattiello (yellow card) 71'; Lykogiannis (yellow card) 90+2'	Stadium: Stadio Artemio Franchi; Attendance: 0 Referee: Gianluca Manganiello

12 July 2020 32	Cagliari	0–0	Lecce	Cagliari
19:30 CEST (UTC+02:00)	Birsa (yellow card) 90'	Report	Deiola (yellow card) 75'	Stadium: Sardegna Arena; Attendance: 0 Referee: Daniele Orsato

15 July 2020 33	Sampdoria	3–0	Cagliari	Genoa
19:30 CEST (UTC+02:00)	Gabbiadini 8'; Bonazzoli 41', 53'	Report	Ioniță (yellow card) 17'; Rog (yellow card) 69'	Stadium: Stadio Luigi Ferraris; Attendance: 0 Referee: Luca Pairetto

18 July 2020 34	Cagliari	1–1	Sassuolo	Cagliari
19:30 CEST (UTC+02:00)	Carboni (yellow card) 22' (yellow-red card) 48'; Faragò (yellow card) 30'; João Pedro 63'; Rog (yellow card) 83'	Report	Caputo 12'; Marlon (yellow card) 72'; Ferrari (yellow card) 86'	Stadium: Sardegna Arena; Attendance: 0 Referee: Giovanni Ayroldi

23 July 2020 35	Lazio	2–1	Cagliari	Rome
21:45 CEST (UTC+02:00)	Jony (yellow card) 45+1'; Milinković-Savić 47'; Lazzari (yellow card) 50'; Immobile 60'; Parolo (yellow card) 90'	Report	Simeone 45'; Klavan (yellow card) 87'	Stadium: Stadio Olimpico; Attendance: 0 Referee: Marco Piccinini

26 July 2020 36	Cagliari	0–1	Udinese	Cagliari
19:30 CEST (UTC+02:00)	Ioniță (yellow card) 75'; Nández (yellow card) 89'	Report	Okaka 3'; Stryger Larsen (yellow card) 21'	Stadium: Sardegna Arena; Attendance: 0 Referee: Fabrizio Pasqua

29 July 2020 37	Cagliari	2–0	Juventus	Cagliari
21:45 CEST (UTC+02:00)	Gagliano 8'; Rog (yellow card) 17'; Simeone 45+2'; João Pedro (yellow card) 65'	Report	Pjanić (yellow card) 25'	Stadium: Sardegna Arena; Attendance: 0 Referee: Davide Ghersini

1 August 2020 38	Milan	3–0	Cagliari	Milan
20:45 CEST (UTC+02:00)	Klavan 11' (o.g.); Ibrahimović 55'; Castillejo 57'; Saelemaekers (yellow card) 67'	Report	Pereiro (yellow card) 13'; Faragò (yellow card) 45'; Cragno (yellow card) 58'	Stadium: San Siro; Attendance: 0 Referee: Marco Serra

=== Coppa Italia ===
18 August 2019 Third round	Cagliari	2–1	Chievo	Cagliari
20:30 CEST (UTC+02:00)	João Pedro 7'; Rog 17'; Rafael (red card) 40'; Nainggolan (yellow card) 72'	Report	Pucciarelli 43', (yellow card) 43'; Bertagnoli (yellow card) 72'; Pina (yellow card) 90'	Stadium: Sardegna Arena; Attendance: 12,007; Referee: Antonio Giua

5 December 2019 Fourth round	Cagliari	2–1	Sampdoria	Cagliari
21:00 CET (UTC+01:00)	Cerri 7'; Ragatzu 48'	Report	Gabbiadini 87'	Stadium: Sardegna Arena; Attendance: 11,781; Referee: Gianluca Manganiello

14 January 2020 Round of 16	Internazionale	4–1	Cagliari	Milan
20:45 CET (UTC+01:00)	Lukaku 1', 49'; Valero 22'; Godín (yellow card) 65'; Ranocchia 81'; Sensi (yellow card) 90+4'	Report	Lykogiannis (yellow card) 46'; Oliva 73'	Stadium: San Siro; Attendance: 28,914; Referee: Daniele Chiffi

== Statistics ==
=== Appearances and goals ===
No.	Pos	Nat	Player	Total		Serie A		Coppa Italia	
No.	Pos	Nat	Player	Apps	Goals	Apps	Goals	Apps	Goals
Goalkeepers
1	GK	(Brazil) BRA	Rafael	7	0	5+1	0	1	0
28	GK	(Italy) ITA	Alessio Cragno	16	0	16	0	0	0
Defenders
3	DF	(Italy) ITA	Federico Mattiello	18	0	9+9	0	0	0
15	DF	(Estonia) EST	Ragnar Klavan	33	0	26+5	0	2	0
19	DF	(Italy) ITA	Fabio Pisacane	32	1	28+2	1	1+1	0
22	DF	(Greece) GRE	Charalambos Lykogiannis	23	0	14+6	0	3	0
23	DF	(Italy) ITA	Luca Ceppitelli	17	2	15+1	2	1	0
33	DF	(Italy) ITA	Luca Pellegrini	24	0	22+2	0	0	0
36	DF	(Italy) ITA	Andrea Carboni	7	0	5+2	0	0	0
40	DF	(Poland) POL	Sebastian Walukiewicz	16	0	13+1	0	2	0
Midfielders
4	MF	(Belgium) BEL	Radja Nainggolan	29	6	25+1	6	2+1	0
6	MF	(Croatia) CRO	Marko Rog	32	2	28+2	1	1+1	1
8	MF	(Italy) ITA	Luca Cigarini	22	0	19+3	0	0	0
10	MF	(Brazil) BRA	João Pedro	39	19	35+1	18	1+2	1
14	MF	(Slovenia) SVN	Valter Birsa	15	0	4+9	0	1+1	0
17	MF	(Uruguay) URU	Christian Oliva	13	2	4+7	1	2	1
18	MF	(Uruguay) URU	Nahitan Nández	38	2	32+3	2	1+2	0
21	MF	(Moldova) MDA	Artur Ioniță	37	0	21+13	0	3	0
24	MF	(Italy) ITA	Paolo Faragò	22	1	14+7	1	1	0
25	MF	(Italy) ITA	Federico Marigosu	2	0	0+2	0	0	0
35	MF	(Italy) ITA	Riccardo Ladinetti	3	0	1+2	0	0	0
Forwards
9	FW	(Italy) ITA	Alberto Paloschi	7	0	1+6	0	0	0
20	FW	(Uruguay) URU	Gastón Pereiro	10	1	4+6	1	0	0
26	FW	(Italy) ITA	Daniele Ragatzu	14	2	2+11	1	1	1
30	FW	(Italy) ITA	Leonardo Pavoletti	3	0	1+1	0	1	0
37	FW	(Italy) ITA	Luca Gagliano	2	1	1+1	1	0	0
99	FW	(Argentina) ARG	Giovanni Simeone	37	12	34+3	12	0	0
Players transferred out during the season
2	DF	(Italy) ITA	Simone Pinna	2	0	1	0	1	0
9	FW	(Italy) ITA	Alberto Cerri	13	2	1+10	1	2	1
12	DF	(Italy) ITA	Fabrizio Cacciatore	17	0	14+2	0	1	0
20	GK	(Italy) ITA	Simone Aresti	1	0	0	0	0+1	0
27	MF	(Italy) ITA	Alessandro Deiola	2	0	0+1	0	1	0
29	MF	(Argentina) ARG	Lucas Castro	17	2	6+9	2	2	0
90	GK	(Sweden) SWE	Robin Olsen	19	0	17	0	2	0

Last updated: 1 August 2020
Source: Competitions

=== Goalscorers ===
Rank	No.	Pos	Nat	Name	Serie A	Coppa Italia	Total
1	10	MF	(Brazil)	João Pedro	18	1	19
2	99	FW	(Argentina)	Giovanni Simeone	11	0	11
3	4	MF	(Belgium)	Radja Nainggolan	6	0	6
4	6	MF	(Croatia)	Marko Rog	1	1	2
4	9	FW	(Italy)	Alberto Cerri	1	1	2
4	17	MF	(Uruguay)	Christian Oliva	1	1	2
4	23	DF	(Italy)	Luca Ceppitelli	2	0	2
4	26	FW	(Italy)	Daniele Ragatzu	1	1	2
4	29	MF	(Argentina)	Lucas Castro	2	0	2
4	18	MF	(Uruguay)	Nahitan Nández	2	0	2
11	19	DF	(Italy)	Fabio Pisacane	1	0	1
11	20	MF	(Uruguay)	Gastón Pereiro	1	0	1
11	24	MF	(Italy)	Paolo Faragò	1	0	1
Own goal					2	0	2
Totals					50	5	55

Last updated: 23 July 2020

=== Clean sheets ===
Rank	No.	Pos	Nat	Name	Serie A	Coppa Italia	Total
1	90	GK	(Sweden)	Robin Olsen	3	0	3
Totals					3	0	3

Last updated: 9 February 2020

=== Disciplinary record ===
No.	Pos	Nat	Name	Serie A			Coppa Italia			Total		
No.	Pos	Nat	Name	Booked	(yellow card) (yellow-red card)	Sent off (straight red)	Booked	(yellow card) (yellow-red card)	Sent off (straight red)	Booked	(yellow card) (yellow-red card)	Sent off (straight red)
1	GK	(Brazil)	Rafael	0	0	0	0	0	1	0	0	1
90	GK	(Sweden)	Robin Olsen	0	0	1	0	0	0	0	0	1
2	DF	(Italy)	Simone Pinna	1	0	0	0	0	0	1	0	0
3	DF	(Italy)	Federico Mattiello	1	0	0	0	0	0	1	0	0
12	DF	(Italy)	Fabrizio Cacciatore	1	0	1	0	0	0	1	0	1
15	DF	(Estonia)	Ragnar Klavan	3	0	0	0	0	0	3	0	0
19	DF	(Italy)	Fabio Pisacane	4	1	0	0	0	0	4	1	0
22	DF	(Greece)	Charalambos Lykogiannis	3	0	0	1	0	0	4	0	0
23	DF	(Italy)	Luca Ceppitelli	4	0	0	0	0	0	4	0	0
33	DF	(Italy)	Luca Pellegrini	8	0	0	0	0	0	8	0	0
4	MF	(Belgium)	Radja Nainggolan	5	0	0	1	0	0	6	0	0
6	MF	(Croatia)	Marko Rog	6	0	0	0	0	0	6	0	0
8	MF	(Italy)	Luca Cigarini	5	0	0	0	0	0	5	0	0
10	MF	(Brazil)	João Pedro	3	0	0	0	0	0	3	0	0
17	MF	(Uruguay)	Christian Oliva	1	0	0	0	0	0	1	0	0
18	MF	(Uruguay)	Nahitan Nández	9	0	0	0	0	0	9	0	0
21	MF	(Moldova)	Artur Ioniță	3	0	0	0	0	0	3	0	0
24	MF	(Italy)	Paolo Faragò	1	0	0	0	0	0	1	0	0
29	MF	(Argentina)	Lucas Castro	2	0	0	0	0	0	2	0	0
9	FW	(Italy)	Alberto Cerri	1	0	0	0	0	0	1	0	0
20	FW	(Uruguay)	Gastón Pereiro	1	0	0	0	0	0	1	0	0
99	FW	(Argentina)	Giovanni Simeone	3	0	0	0	0	0	3	0	0
Totals				65	1	2	2	0	1	67	1	3

Last updated: 9 February 2020
