= Francesco Verde =

Francesco Verde may refer to:

- Francesco Verde (bishop)
- Francesco Verde (footballer)
