= Alberto Cerri =

Italian footballer (born 1996)

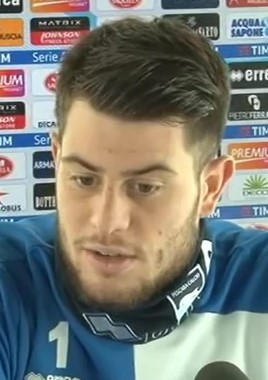
- Cerri at his presentation as a Pescara player, 2017

Personal information
- Date of birth: 16 April 1996 (age 30)
- Place of birth: Parma, Italy
- Height: 1.94 m (6 ft 4 in)
- Position: Forward

Team information
- Current team: Arezzo
- Number: 9

Youth career
- 2006–2014: Parma

Senior career*
Years	Team	Apps	(Gls)
2012–2015	Parma	2	(0)
2014–2015	→ Lanciano (loan)	19	(4)
2015–2019	Juventus	0	(0)
2015–2016	→ Cagliari (loan)	24	(3)
2016–2017	→ SPAL (loan)	15	(1)
2017	→ Pescara (loan)	13	(2)
2017–2018	→ Perugia (loan)	34	(15)
2018–2023	Cagliari	50	(2)
2020–2021	→ SPAL (loan)	8	(1)
2021–2023	→ Como (loan)	61	(19)
2023–2026	Como	10	(1)
2024	→ Empoli (loan)	12	(1)
2025	→ Salernitana (loan)	18	(3)
2026	Cesena	16	(3)
2026–	Arezzo	0	(0)

International career^{‡}
2011–2012	Italy U16	8	(4)
2011–2013	Italy U17	31	(12)
2013	Italy U18	2	(1)
2014–2015	Italy U19	15	(5)
2015–2018	Italy U21	21	(2)
- * Club domestic league appearances and goals as of 13 May 2026 ‡ National team caps and goals as of 11 September 2018

Alberto Cerri (born 16 April 1996) is an Italian professional footballer who plays as a forward for Serie B club Arezzo.

== Club career ==
=== Parma ===
On 30 March 2013, Cerri made his debut for Parma as a substitute, replacing Amauri in the 76th minute of a 3–0 home win over Pescara at the age of 16 years and 348 days. On 6 April 2014, he made his second appearance as a substitute replacing Jonathan Biabiany in the 92nd minute of a 1–0 home win over Napoli.

==== Loan to Virtus Lanciano ====
On 28 August 2014, Cerri was signed by Serie B side Virtus Lanciano on a season-long loan deal. On 30 August he made his Serie B debut for Virtus Lanciano as a substitute replacing Gaetano Vastola in the 88th minute, and he scored his first professional goal in the 94th minute of a 3–3 away draw against Catania. On 20 September, Cerri scored his second goal in the 55th minute of a 5–1 home defeat against Frosinone. On 23 September he scored his third goal in the 75th minute of a 1–1 away draw against Brescia. On 29 September he scored his fourth goal in the 15th minute of a 1–1 home draw against Bari. On 25 April 2015, Cerri was sent off with a red card in the 77th minute of a 1–0 home defeat against Pescara. On 22 May he played his first entire match for Virtus Lanciano, a 1–0 away defeat against Bologna. Cerri ended his loan to Virtus Entella with 19 appearances, 4 goals and 1 assist.

=== Juventus ===
On 15 July 2015, Cerri was signed by Serie A side Juventus on a free transfer.

==== Loan to Cagliari ====
On 21 August 2015, Cerri was loaned to Serie B club Cagliari on a season-long loan deal. On 22 September, Cerri made his Serie B debut for Cagliari in a 3–1 away win over Virtus Entella; he was replaced by Federico Melchiorri in the 79th minute. On 7 November he played his first entire match for Cagliari, a 2–1 home win over Modena. On 3 December he played in the fourth round of Coppa Italia in a 1–0 away win over Sassuolo. On 9 December, Cerri scored his first goal for Cagliari in the 67th minute of a 3–1 away win over Virtus Lanciano. On 15 December he played in a 3–0 away defeat against Internazionale in the quarter-finals of Coppa Italia; he played the entire match. On 29 January 2016, Cerri scored his second goal, as a substitute, in the 78th minute of a 2–1 away win over Avellino. On 6 May he scored his third goal, again as a substitute, in the 87th minute of a 3–0 away win over Bari. Cerri ended his loan to Cagliari with 26 appearances, 3 goals and 4 assists.

==== Loan to SPAL and Pescara ====
On 1 August 2016, Cerri was signed by Serie B side SPAL on a six-month loan deal. On 7 August, Cerri made his debut for SPAL, and he scored his first goal in the 63rd minute of a 2–0 home win over Messina in the second round of Coppa Italia; he was replaced by Gianmarco Zigoni in the 70th minute. On 15 August he played in a 5–1 away defeat against Cagliari in the third round of Coppa Italia; he played the entire match. On 27 August he made his Serie B debut for SPAL in a 2–0 away defeat against Benevento; he played the entire match. On 22 October he scored his first goal for SPAL, in Serie B, in the 50th minute of a 3–1 home win over Carpi. Cerri ended his 6-month loan to SPAL with 17 appearances, 2 goals and 2 assists.

On 4 January 2017, Cerri was loaned to Serie A side Pescara on a 6-month loan deal. On 15 January he made his Serie A debut for Pescara as a substitute replacing Valerio Verre in the 70th minute of a 3–1 away defeat against Napoli. On 19 February, Cerri played his first entire match for Pescara, and he scored his first goal in Serie A in the 87th minute of a 5–0 home win over Genoa. On 4 March he scored his second goal in the 32nd minute of a 3–1 away defeat against Sampdoria. Cerri ended his loan to Pescara with 13 appearances, 2 goals and 1 assist.

==== Loan to Perugia ====
On 24 July 2017, Cerri was signed by Serie B club Perugia on a season-long loan deal. On 6 August he made his debut for Perugia in a 2–1 home win over Gubbio in the second round of Coppa Italia; he played the entire match. On 12 August he made his first hat-trick in his career in a 4–0 away win over Benevento in the third round of Coppa Italia. On 26 August he made his Serie B debut for Perugia, and he scored his first goal in the 13th minute of a 5–1 away win over Virtus Entella. On 11 September, Cerri scored his second goal in Serie B in the 31st minute of a 1–1 away draw against Cittadella. On 12 November he was sent off with a double yellow card in the 59th minute of a 1–0 away defeat against Venezia. On 6 November he scored his third goal, as a substitute, in the 75th minute of a 1–1 home draw against Avellino. On 30 November, Cerri played in the fourth round of Coppa Italia and he scored a goal in the 45th minute of an 8–3 away defeat against Udinese. On 10 March 2018, he scored his 10th goal of the season, in Serie B, in the 59th minute of a 2–0 home win over Foggia. Cerri ended his loan to Perugia with 34 appearances, 19 goals and 12 assists.

==== Loan to Cagliari ====
On 12 July 2018, Cerri signed a loan with Cagliari until 30 June 2019, with an obligatory buy. He returned to Cagliari after the 2015–16 season. On 12 August he made his debut for Cagliari as a substitute replacing Leonardo Pavoletti in the 86th minute of a 2–1 home win over Palermo in the third round of Coppa Italia. One week later he made his Serie A debut again as a substitute replacing Artur Ioniţă for the last 17 minutes of a 2–0 away defeat against Empoli. On 22 September, Cerri played his first match as a starter for Cagliari. a 2–0 away defeat against Parma, he was replaced by Diego Farias in the 60th minute.

=== Cagliari ===
On 19 February 2019, Cagliari bought Cerri for €9 million from Juventus.

==== Second loan to SPAL ====
On 31 January 2020, he rejoined SPAL on loan until the end of the 2019–20 season.

=== Como ===
On 17 August 2021, he joined Como on a season-long loan. On 2 July 2022, Cerri re-joined Como on another loan, with an obligation to buy in the summer of 2023, and signed a contract with Como until June 2026.

==== Loan to Empoli ====
On 19 January 2024, Cerri joined Serie A club Empoli on loan, with an optional buy-clause, which becomes mandatory if certain unspecified conditions are met.

==== Loan to Salernitana ====
On 7 January 2025, Cerri moved on loan to Salernitana in Serie B until the end of the season.

=== Cesena ===
On 2 February 2026, Cerri signed a two-and-a-half-year contract with Cesena.

== International career ==
Cerri represented Italy at the U-16, U-17, U-18, U-19 and U-21 level. With the Italy U17 side, he took part in the 2013 UEFA European Under-17 Championship and at the 2013 FIFA U-17 World Cup.

He made his debut with Italy U21 on 12 August 2015, in a friendly match against Hungary.

In June 2017, he was included in the Italy under-21 squad for the 2017 UEFA European Under-21 Championship by manager Luigi Di Biagio. Italy were eliminated in the semi-finals following a 3–1 defeat to Spain on 27 June.

== Career statistics ==
=== Club ===
As of match played 24 September 2025

Appearances and goals by club, season and competition
Club	Season	League			Cup		Europe		Other		Total	
Club	Season	League	Apps	Goals	Apps	Goals	Apps	Goals	Apps	Goals	Apps	Goals
Parma	2012–13	Serie A	1	0	0	0	—		—		1	0
Parma	2013–14	Serie A	1	0	0	0	—		—		1	0
Virtus Lanciano (loan)	2014–15	Serie B	19	4	0	0	—		—		19	4
Cagliari (loan)	2015–16	Serie B	24	3	2	0	—		—		26	3
SPAL (loan)	2016–17	Serie B	15	1	2	1	—		—		17	2
Pescara (loan)	2016–17	Serie A	13	2	—		—		—		13	2
Perugia (loan)	2017–18	Serie B	34	15	3	4	—		—		37	19
Cagliari	2018–19	Serie A	15	0	2	1	—		—		17	1
Cagliari	2019–20	Serie A	11	1	2	1	—		—		13	2
Cagliari	2020–21	Serie A	26	1	2	1	—		—		20	2
Cagliari	2021–22	Serie A	0	0	0	0	—		—		0	0
Cagliari	Total		68	5	8	3	0	0	0	0	76	8
SPAL (loan)	2019–20	Serie A	8	1	0	0	—		—		8	1
Como (loan)	2021–22	Serie B	27	10	0	0	—		—		27	10
Como (loan)	2022–23	Serie B	34	9	1	0	—		—		35	9
Como (loan)	Total		61	19	1	0	—		—		62	19
Como	2023–24	Serie B	5	1	1	0	—		—		6	1
Como	2024–25	Serie A	5	0	0	0	—		—		5	0
Como	2025–26	Serie A	0	0	1	0	—		—		1	0
Como	Total		10	1	2	0	—		—		12	1
Empoli (loan)	2023–24	Serie A	12	1	0	0	—		—		12	1
Salernitana (loan)	2024–25	Serie B	18	3	—		—		2 (Note: Appearances in Serie B play-out)	0	20	3
Career total			260	52	16	8	—		2	0	271	58

== Honours ==
Cagliari

- Serie B: 2015–16

SPAL

- Serie B: 2016–17

Italy U17

- UEFA European Under-17 Championship runner-up: 2013
