= Alessio Cragno =

Italian footballer (born 1994)

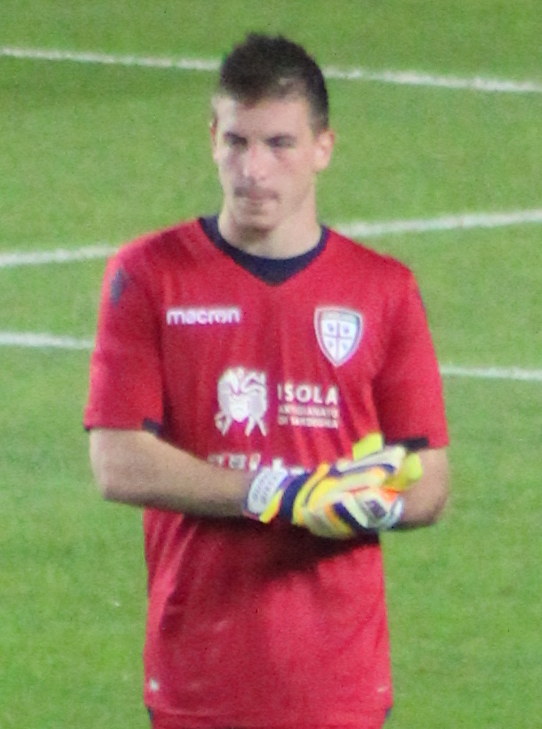
- Cragno with Cagliari in 2017

Personal information
- Full name: Alessio Cragno
- Date of birth: 28 June 1994 (age 32)
- Place of birth: Fiesole, Italy
- Height: 1.85 m (6 ft 1 in)
- Position: Goalkeeper

Youth career
- 2003–2006: Polisportiva Sieci
- 2006–2009: Cattolica Virtus
- 2009–2012: Brescia

Senior career*
Years	Team	Apps	(Gls)
2012–2014	Brescia	32	(0)
2014–2023	Cagliari	166	(0)
2016	→ Virtus Lanciano (loan)	18	(0)
2016–2017	→ Benevento (loan)	33	(0)
2022–2023	→ Monza (loan)	1	(0)
2023–2025	Monza	0	(0)
2023–2024	→ Sassuolo (loan)	3	(0)
2025	Sampdoria	14	(0)
2026	Südtirol	2	(0)

International career^{‡}
2011	Italy U17	7	(0)
2011–2012	Italy U18	9	(0)
2012–2013	Italy U19	13	(0)
2013–2015	Italy U20	7	(0)
2014–2017	Italy U21	12	(0)
2020–2021	Italy	2	(0)
Medal record
Men's Football
Representing Italy
CONMEBOL–UEFA Cup of Champions
Runner-up	2022 England
- * Club domestic league appearances and goals as of 12 May 2026 ‡ National team caps and goals as of 28 May 2021

Alessio Cragno (born 28 June 1994) is an Italian professional footballer who plays as a goalkeeper.

== Club career ==
=== Brescia ===
Cragno made his debut at Brescia Calcio on 25 September 2012 against Modena in a Serie B game, as the starting keeper, ahead of Stefano Russo; first choice keeper Michele Arcari was rested. Brescia won the game 2–1 after two goals from Andrea Caracciolo. Before the start of season Brescia had sold their first choice keeper Nicola Leali to Juventus. Cragno has been Brescia's first-choice regular since the 2013–14 season and performed well. Cragno also signed a contract with Brescia which would last until 30 June 2016, in 2012–13 season.

=== Cagliari ===
In July 2014, Cragno moved to Serie A side Cagliari, penning a four-year deal for a fee of €1 million. His debut for Cagliari was in a 2–0 Serie A match loss against Roma on 21 September 2014.

==== Loan to Lanciano ====
In January 2016 he was loaned to Lanciano in Serie B, who by the end of the season were relegated to Lega Pro after losing the play-out matches against Salernitana. On 9 June 2016, Cragno signed a new four-year deal with Cagliari.

==== Loan to Benevento ====
In summer 2016, he was sent again on loan with option to buy, to Serie B newcomer Benevento. After a successful season, in which Benevento achieved the promotion to Serie A through play-offs with Cragno as the starting goalkeeper, he returned to Cagliari in the summer of 2017.

==== Return to Cagliari ====
During the 2017–18 season he returned to Cagliari, establishing himself as the goalkeeper of the rossoblù team. He played 29 Serie A games, as well as a game in the Coppa Italia – keeping a clean sheet on 7 occasions. The team remained in the top flight after finishing in 16th place.

In the 2018–19 season Cragno stood out as one of the best goalkeepers in the league: he won the Premio Apport for best goalkeeper in Serie A, being voted by the Associazione Italiana Preparatori Portieri Calcio (Italian Association of Goalkeepers Trainers). He finished the season as the player with the most minutes played in the league (3,686) and the goalkeeper with the most saves made (152).

He renewed his contract with Cagliari until 2024. On 7 August 2019, during a pre-season friendly match played in Istanbul against Fenerbahçe, he sustained an injury and remained on the sidelines for five months. He returned to the field on 26 January 2020, in a 1–1 draw against Inter Milan.

=== Monza ===
On 27 June 2022, Cragno joined newly-promoted Serie A side Monza on a one-year loan, with an option and conditional obligation for purchase. He made his debut on 8 August, in a 3–2 Coppa Italia win against Frosinone.

==== Loan to Sassuolo ====
After Monza had avoided relegation in the 2022–23 Serie A season, on 15 July 2023, Cragno was sent on loan to Sassuolo with an option to buy.

=== Sampdoria ===
On 3 February 2025, Cragno joined Sampdoria on a half-season deal.

=== Südtirol ===
On 28 January 2026, Cragno signed with Südtirol in Serie B until the end of the 2025–26 season.

== International career ==
Cragno made his debut with the Italy under-21 squad on 4 June 2014, replacing Francesco Bardi in a friendly match won 4–0 against Montenegro. In June 2017, he was included in the Italy under-21 squad for the 2017 UEFA European Under-21 Championship by manager Luigi Di Biagio.

Cragno was given his first senior international call-up for Italy in September 2018, by manager Roberto Mancini, for Italy's opening UEFA Nations League matches against Poland and Portugal later that month. On 7 October 2020, Cragno made his senior International debut for Italy in a friendly match against Moldova, replacing Salvatore Sirigu in the second half of a 6–0 home win.

== Career statistics ==
=== Club ===
As of match played 6 April 2025

Appearances and goals by club, season and competition
Club	Season	League			National Cup		Other		Total	
Club	Season	Division	Apps	Goals	Apps	Goals	Apps	Goals	Apps	Goals
Brescia	2012–13	Serie B	2	0	0	0	—		2	0
Brescia	2013–14	Serie B	30	0	1	0	—		31	0
Brescia	Total		32	0	1	0	0	0	33	0
Cagliari	2014–15	Serie A	14	0	2	0	—		16	0
Cagliari	2015–16	Serie B	0	0	2	0	—		2	0
Cagliari	2017–18	Serie A	29	0	1	0	—		30	0
Cagliari	2018–19	Serie A	38	0	2	0	—		40	0
Cagliari	2019–20	Serie A	16	0	0	0	—		16	0
Cagliari	2020–21	Serie A	34	0	0	0	—		34	0
Cagliari	2021–22	Serie A	35	0	1	0	–		36	0
Cagliari	Total		166	0	8	0	—		174	0
Virtus Lanciano (loan)	2015–16	Serie B	18	0	0	0	2 (Note: Appearances in Serie B – Relegation play-outs)	0	20	0
Benevento (loan)	2016–17	Serie B	33	0	1	0	5 (Note: Appearances in Serie B – Promotion play-offs)	0	39	0
Monza (loan)	2022–23	Serie A	1	0	3	0	—		4	0
Monza	2024–25	Serie A	0	0	0	0	—		0	0
Monza	Total		1	0	3	0	—		4	0
Sassuolo (loan)	2023–24	Serie A	3	0	2	0	—		5	0
Sampdoria	2024–25	Serie B	8	0	—		—		8	0
Career total			261	0	15	0	7	0	283	0

=== International ===
As of match played 28 May 2021

Appearances and goals by national team and year
National team	Year	Apps	Goals
Italy	2020	1	0
Italy	2021	1	0
Total		2	0

== Honours ==
Individual

- Serie B Footballer of the Year: 2017
