= Luca Ceppitelli =

Italian footballer

Personal information
- Full name: Luca Ceppitelli
- Date of birth: 11 August 1989 (age 37)
- Place of birth: Castiglione del Lago, Italy
- Height: 1.89 m (6 ft 2 in)
- Position: Defender

Youth career
- –2009: Perugia

Senior career*
| Years | Team | Apps | (Gls) |
| 2007–2009 | Perugia | 1 | (0) |
| 2009–2011 | Andria | 59 | (3) |
| 2011–2013 | Bari | 62 | (5) |
| 2013–2014 | Parma | 0 | (0) |
| 2013–2014 | → Bari (loan) | 38 | (6) |
| 2014–2022 | Cagliari | 180 | (10) |
| 2022–2023 | Venezia | 22 | (0) |
| 2023–2024 | Feralpisalò | 30 | (0) |
| 2024–2025 | Südtirol | 10 | (0) |
- * Club domestic league appearances and goals as of 13 May 2025

Luca Ceppitelli (born 11 August 1989) is an Italian professional footballer who plays as a defender.

== Career ==
=== Perugia ===
Born in Castiglione del Lago, in the Province of Perugia, Umbria, Ceppitelli started his career at hometown club Perugia. He played once in 2006–07 Serie C1 season for the central Italy team, the last round of the season.

=== Andria ===
In January 2009 he left for southern Italy side A.S. Andria BAT in co-ownership deal, which the team represented the Province of Barletta–Andria–Trani, Apulia. Perugia also re-signed Giampaolo Giuliacci from Andria. In June 2009, Andria purchased him outright.

In 2009–10 Lega Pro Prima Divisione season, he made 15 starts with Andria, plus 1 start in the relegation tie-breaker. That season he also received three call-up from Italy national under-20 football team, one for training camp, Four Nations Tournament, one for unofficial friendly against Serie D Best XI. He did not play in either match. He also received a call-up to represent Prima Divisione Group B for a trophy against Group A's under-21 representative team. As the starting defender of the team in 433 formation he lost the match with the team.

=== Bari ===
On 30 August 2010, Serie A team Bari signed Ceppitelli (also located in Apulia) along with two other youth team players of Andria (R.Moretti & Leonetti). However, he spent the first season loaned back to Andria.

On 2 September 2013, half of the registration rights of Ceppitelli was signed by Parma. Bari acquired half of the rights of Dembel Sall. Both 50% registration rights were "valued" €500,000 (the liquidator re-valued 50% rights of Ceppitelli to €464,226.75). Ceppitelli also returned to Bari in temporary deal as well as Sall to Parma. That season he was vice-captain of the team, or as captain when Marino Defendi was suspended.

=== Parma ===
On 1 July 2014, Ceppitelli formally became a player of Parma, after the co-ownership deal was renewed in June 2014. Ceppitelli participated in pre-season friendlies.

=== Cagliari ===
On 7 August 2014, he was sold to fellow Serie A club Cagliari from Parma and Bari for €2.1 million. Bari received €1 million for their portion.

=== Venezia ===
On 5 October 2022, Ceppitelli signed with Venezia until the end of the 2022–23 season, with an automatic extension option in case some conditions are met.

=== Südtirol ===
On 5 July 2024, Ceppitelli joined Südtirol for the 2024–25 season.

== Career statistics ==
As of match played 22 May 2022

Appearances and goals by club, season and competition
| Club | Season | League | | | National Cup | | Continental | | Other | | Total | |
| Club | Season | Division | Apps | Goals | Apps | Goals | Apps | Goals | Apps | Goals | Apps | Goals |
|---|---|---|---|---|---|---|---|---|---|---|---|---|
| Perugia | 2006–07 | Serie C | 1 | 0 | 0 | 0 | — | | — | | 1 | 0 |
| Andria | 2008–09 | Lega Pro Seconda Divisione | 7 | 0 | 0 | 0 | — | | 1 (Note: Appearances in Lega Pro Seconda Divisione-Play-off) | 0 | 8 | 0 |
| Andria | 2009–10 | Lega Pro | 23 | 0 | 0 | 0 | — | | 2 (Note: Appearances in Lega Pro-Play-out) | 0 | 25 | 0 |
| Andria | 2010–11 | Lega Pro | 29 | 3 | 0 | 0 | — | | — | | 29 | 3 |
| Andria | Total | | 59 | 3 | 0 | 0 | 0 | 0 | 3 | 0 | 62 | 3 |
| Bari | 2011–12 | Serie B | 25 | 0 | 2 | 0 | — | | — | | 27 | 0 |
| Bari | 2012–13 | Serie B | 37 | 5 | 1 | 0 | — | | — | | 38 | 5 |
| Bari (loan) | 2013–14 | Serie B | 38 | 6 | 1 | 0 | — | | 3 (Note: Appearances in Serie B – Promotion play-offs) | 0 | 42 | 6 |
| Bari (loan) | Total | | 100 | 11 | 4 | 0 | 0 | 0 | 3 | 0 | 107 | 11 |
| Cagliari | 2014–15 | Serie A | 25 | 0 | 2 | 0 | — | | — | | 27 | 0 |
| Cagliari | 2015–16 | Serie B | 26 | 3 | 0 | 0 | — | | — | | 26 | 3 |
| Cagliari | 2016–17 | Serie A | 19 | 0 | 1 | 0 | — | | — | | 20 | 0 |
| Cagliari | 2017–18 | Serie A | 27 | 3 | 0 | 0 | — | | — | | 27 | 3 |
| Cagliari | 2018–19 | Serie A | 24 | 1 | 2 | 0 | — | | — | | 26 | 1 |
| Cagliari | 2019–20 | Serie A | 16 | 2 | 1 | 0 | — | | — | | 17 | 2 |
| Cagliari | 2020–21 | Serie A | 19 | 0 | 1 | 0 | — | | — | | 20 | 0 |
| Cagliari | 2021–22 | Serie A | 24 | 1 | 1 | 0 | — | | — | | 25 | 1 |
| Cagliari | Total | | 180 | 10 | 8 | 0 | 0 | 0 | 0 | 0 | 188 | 10 |
| Venezia | 2022–23 | Serie B | 19 | 0 | 0 | 0 | — | | — | | 19 | 0 |
| Career total | | | 351 | 24 | 14 | 0 | 0 | 0 | 3 | 0 | 368 | 24 |

== Honours ==
Cagliari

- Serie B: 2015–16
