= Paolo Faragò =

Italian footballer

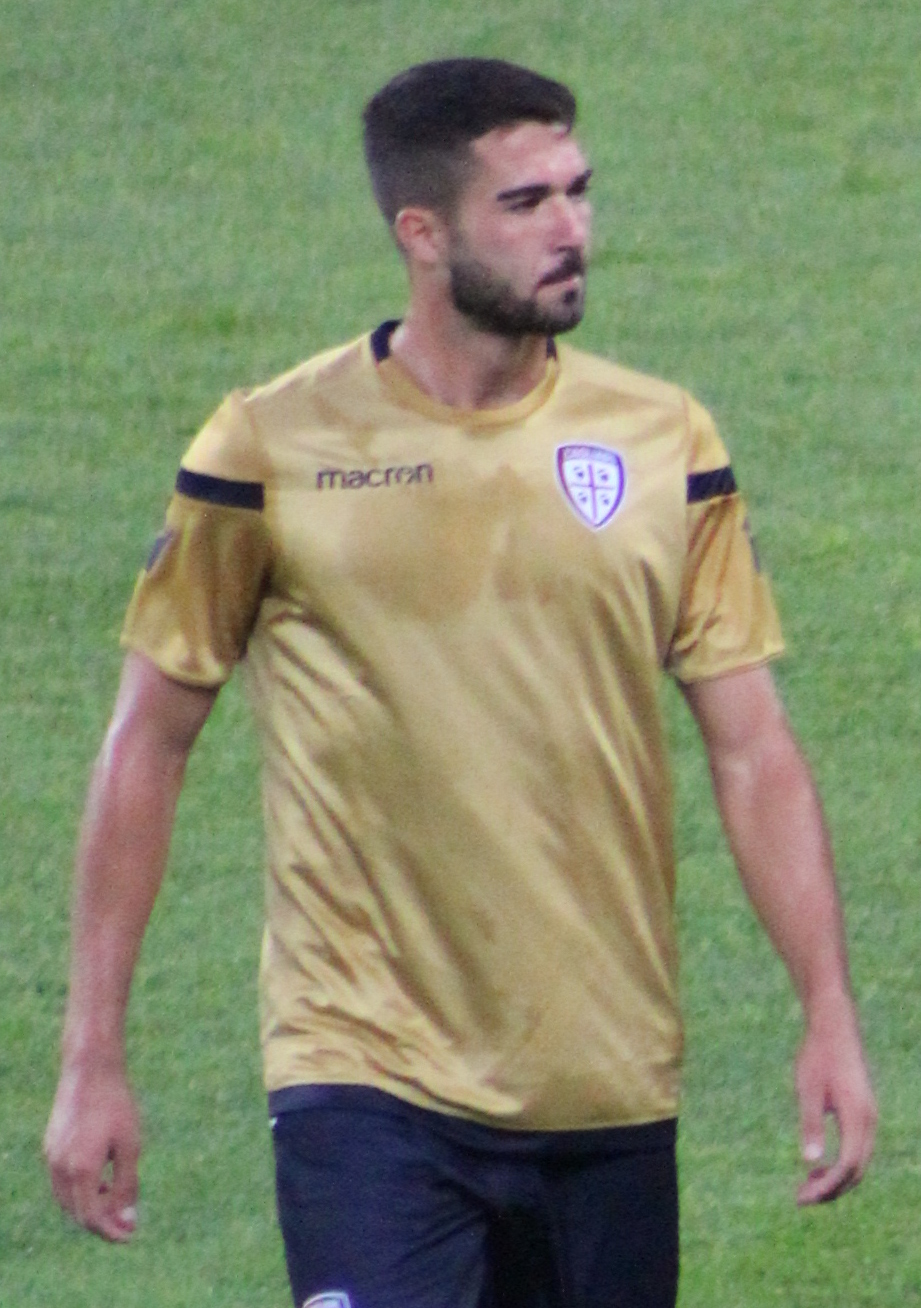
- Faragò in 2017

Personal information
- Full name: Pancrazio Paolo Faragò
- Date of birth: 12 February 1993 (age 33)
- Place of birth: Catanzaro, Italy
- Height: 1.87 m (6 ft 2 in)
- Position: Midfielder

Youth career
- Novara

Senior career*
Years	Team	Apps	(Gls)
2012–2017	Novara	127	(19)
2017–2022	Cagliari	100	(4)
2021	→ Bologna (loan)	1	(0)
2022	→ Lecce (loan)	8	(1)
2022–2024	Como	17	(0)
Total		253	(24)

International career
2013	Italy U20	1	(0)
2013–2014	Italy U21 "B"	6	(1)
2015	Italy U21 "C"	2	(2)
2015	Italy Universiade	6	(0)
- * Club domestic league appearances and goals

Pancrazio Paolo Faragò (born 12 February 1993) is an Italian former professional footballer.

== Biography ==
=== Novara ===
Born in Catanzaro, in the Calabria region, Faragò was a player of the reserve team of Piedmontese club Novara during the 2011–12 season. Faragò made his Serie B debut during the 2012–13 Serie B season. He followed the club from their relegation to Lega Pro in 2014 and their promotion back to Serie B in 2015. In the 2015–16 Serie B season, Faragò wore the number 8 shirt.

=== Cagliari ===
On 19 January 2017, Faragò was signed by Cagliari in a temporary deal, with an obligation to sign him outright.

==== Loan to Bologna ====
On 29 January 2021, Faragò moved to Serie A club Bologna on a loan deal until the end of the season. The loan includes an option to buy.

==== Loan to Lecce ====
On 9 January 2022, he joined Lecce on loan until the end of the season with an option to buy. The option would have become an obligation to buy if certain performance conditions were met.

=== Como ===
On 27 August 2022, Faragò signed a two-year deal with Como.

== Career statistics ==
=== Club ===
As of match played 23 August 2023

Club	Season	League	League		Cup (Note: Includes Coppa Italia)		Europe		Other		Total	
Club	Season	League	Apps	Goals	Apps	Goals	Apps	Goals	Apps	Goals	Apps	Goals
Novara	2012–13	Serie B	16	2	1	0	–		–		17	2
Novara	2013–14	Serie B	35	4	2	2	–		2 (Note: Appearance(s) in Serie B play-out)	0	39	6
Novara	2014–15	Lega Pro	20	1	2	0	–		–		22	1
Novara	2015–16	Serie B	36	7	1	0	–		3 (Note: Appearance(s) in Serie B play-off)	0	40	7
Novara	2016–17	Serie B	20	5	3	0	–		–		23	5
Novara	Total		127	19	9	2	0	0	5	0	141	21
Cagliari	2016–17	Serie A	9	0	0	0	–		–		9	0
Cagliari	2017–18	Serie A	35	2	1	0	–		–		36	2
Cagliari	2018–19	Serie A	26	1	3	0	–		–		29	1
Cagliari	2019–20	Serie A	21	1	1	0	–		–		22	1
Cagliari	2020–21	Serie A	8	0	1	1	–		–		9	1
Cagliari	2021–22	Serie A	1	0	0	0	–		–		1	0
Cagliari	Total		100	4	6	1	0	0	0	0	106	5
Bologna (loan)	2020–21	Serie A	1	0	0	0	–		–		1	0
Lecce (loan)	2021–22	Serie B	8	1	1	0	–		–		9	1
Como	2022–23	Serie B	17	0	0	0	–		–		17	0
Career total			253	24	16	3	0	0	5	0	274	27
