= Riccardo Daga =

Italian footballer (born 2000)

Personal information
- Date of birth: 13 January 2000 (age 26)
- Place of birth: Cagliari, Italy
- Height: 1.94 m (6 ft 4 in)
- Position: Goalkeeper

Team information
- Current team: Iglesias

Youth career
- –2017: Cagliari

Senior career*
Years	Team	Apps	(Gls)
2017–2019	Cagliari	0	(0)
2019–2020	Arezzo	3	(0)
2020–2022	Viterbese	46	(0)
2022	→ Monterosi (loan)	0	(0)
2022–2023	Messina	10	(0)
2023	Viterbese		
2023–2024	Iglesias		
2024–2025	Monastir	6	(0)
2025–	Iglesias		
- * Club domestic league appearances and goals as of 26 October 2025

Riccardo Daga (born 13 January 2000) is an Italian footballer who plays as a goalkeeper for Eccellenza club Iglesias.

== Career ==
In July 2019, Daga moved to Serie C club Arezzo on a free transfer. He made his league debut for the club on 18 September 2019 in a 2–1 defeat to Juventus II.

On 7 September 2020, he signed a 2-year contract with Viterbese. On 28 January 2022, he moved on loan to Monterosi.

On 19 August 2022, Daga joined Messina.
