= Leonardo Pavoletti =

Italian footballer (born 1988)

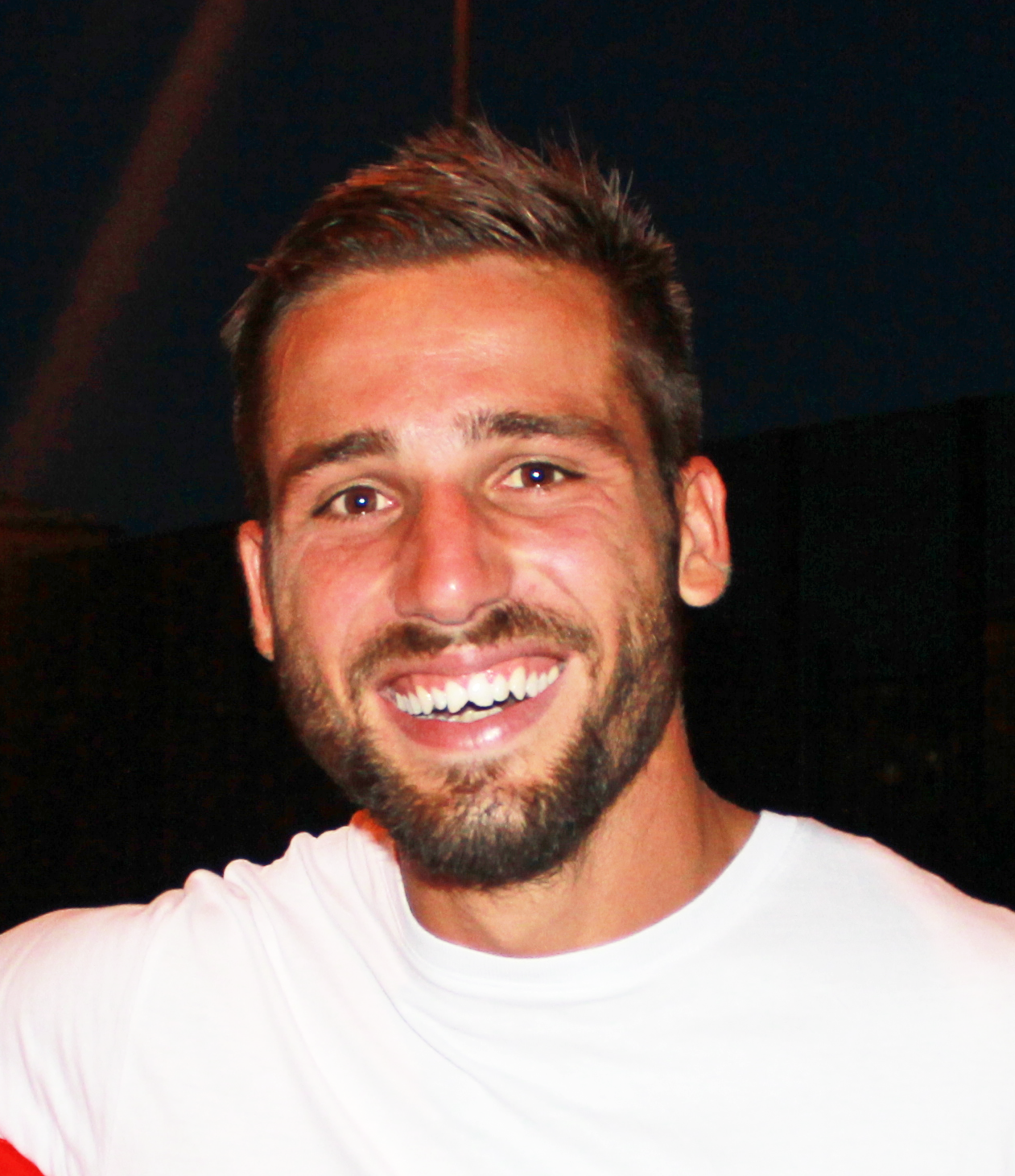
- Pavoletti in 2016

Personal information
- Date of birth: 26 November 1988 (age 37)
- Place of birth: Livorno, Italy
- Height: 1.88 m (6 ft 2 in)
- Position: Striker

Youth career
- Gruppo Sportivo CNFO

Senior career*
Years	Team	Apps	(Gls)
2005–2008	Armando Picchi	59	(16)
2008–2009	Viareggio	26	(7)
2009–2010	Pavia	28	(9)
2010–2011	Juve Stabia	7	(0)
2011	Casale	11	(3)
2011–2012	Virtus Lanciano	36	(16)
2012–2015	Sassuolo	44	(12)
2013–2014	→ Varese (loan)	33	(24)
2015–2017	Genoa	44	(23)
2017–2018	Napoli	6	(0)
2017–2018	→ Cagliari (loan)	33	(11)
2018–2026	Cagliari	182	(39)

International career
2019	Italy	1	(1)
- * Club domestic league appearances and goals as of 17:22, 15 March 2026 (UTC)

Leonardo Pavoletti (Italian pronunciation: [leoˈnardo pavoˈletti]; born 26 November 1988) is an Italian professional footballer who plays as a striker.

== Early and personal life ==
Known to friends as 'Pavoloso', Pavoletti played tennis up until the age of ten, when he began playing football. His father Paolo is a tennis coach. He also owns a Vietnamese pot-bellied pig called Mou.

== Club career ==
=== Early career ===
Born in Livorno, Pavoletti started playing in the youth ranks of Gruppo Sportivo CNFO (Cantiere Navale Fratelli Orlando), he started his career at Armando Picchi. Then had spells at Viareggio, A.C. Pavia, S.S. Juve Stabia and Casale, showing good goalscoring form. He then went to Virtus Lanciano and was awarded the title of top scorer in 2011–12 Lega Pro Prima Divisione season, contributing to the promotion of the team with 16 goals in all competitions and 15 in the league.

=== Sassuolo ===
In the summer 2012, Pavoletti joined Sassuolo, scoring 5 goals in the first 4 league appearances for the Serie B side. However, during the season, he suffered a suspension of 40 days for doping, resulting in positive tests of tuaminoheptane after 26 December 2012 game against Livorno, Sassuolo lodged an appeal against the ban due to the assumption of Rinoflumicil, found in a nasal decongestant. Pavoletti returned to help Sassuolo win th Serie B title and earn promotion to Serie A for the first time in their history, after playing 33 matches and scoring 11 goals.

After making only two appearances in Serie A for Sassuolo during the beginning of the 2013–14 season, on 2 September 2013, the last day of the Italian transfer window, Pavoletti joined Serie B side Varese on loan.

==== Varese loan ====
On 2 September 2013, Pavoletti went on loan to Varese with the right of purchasing his rights at the end of the season. He made his debut six days later, in a 3–0 away victory against Latina in the third game of the 2013–14 Serie B season, also marking the occasion by scoring the final goal of match. In the following game he scored a brace, this time at the expense of Pescara in a 3–2 defeat. He finished the season with 36 appearances and 25 goals, with four of them against Novara Calcio in the relegation playoffs after Varese finished 18th, with Pavoletti scoring a brace in a 2–0 victory and then a 2–2 draw to win 4–2 on aggregate to keep Varese in Serie B and condemning Novara Calcio to relegation. With 24 goals, including 4 in the playoffs, he finished as the second-highest goalscorer in Serie B, behind only Trapani striker Matteo Mancosu, who scored 26 goals.

On 17 June 2014, Varese exercised their option and signed 50% of the player's rights from Sassuolo in a co-ownership deal for a reported €800,000 fee. However, the following day, on 18 June, Sassuolo immediately bought back the full rights to the player, for €400,000 net.

==== Return to Sassuolo ====
Pavoletti's form during 2013–14 season for Varese reportedly alerted the attention of Steaua Bucharest, TSG 1899 Hoffenheim and Leeds United. Pavoletti turned down a last minute transfer deadline deal on 31 August 2014 to Leeds United deciding to stay at Sassuolo where he would compete for places up front with highly rated strikers Simone Zaza, Nicola Sansone and Domenico Berardi.

On 13 December 2014, Pavoletti scored his first Serie A goal in Sassuolo's 2–1 loss against Palermo.

After making 8 Serie A appearances, mainly as a substitute, towards the end of December 2014, Pavoletti was again linked with a move to English side Leeds United, he also attended Leeds' 2–0 loss against Wigan Athletic on 26 December, sitting alongside Leeds Sporting Director Nicola Salerno, Pavoletti also attended Leeds' training ground, ahead of an anticipated loan move in January 2015.

=== Genoa ===
On 29 January 2015, after turning down a loan move to Leeds United, Pavoletti joined fellow Serie A side Genoa on loan for free, with an option to purchase. In the same deal Francesco Acerbi moved in the opposite direction outright, for an additional €1.8 million, as well as Lorenzo Ariaudo moved to Genoa on loan. Pavoletti had a successful spell scoring 6 goals in 10 Serie A games for Genoa. On 7 July 2015, Genoa signed Pavoletti for €4 million transfer fee.

=== Napoli ===
On 2 January 2017, Pavoletti joined Serie A club Napoli, for a reported fee of €18 million.

==== Cagliari ====
On 30 August 2017, Pavoletti joined Cagliari on loan, with an obligation to buy at the end of season, for €10 million plus bonuses, making him the club's most expensive acquisition ever. He signed a 1+4-year contract, which included a €1 million annual salary plus bonuses. He made his club debut on 11 September against Crotone in a 1–0 home victory, and scored his first goal for the club in a 2–3 loss at home to his former club Genoa on 15 October. He finished his first season with the club with 11 goals in 33 appearances in Serie A, nine of which were headers, the most headed goals scored by any player in one of Europe's major leagues throughout the 2017–18 season.

On 25 August 2019, Pavoletti was stretchered off just before half-time in an eventual 1–0 home defeat to Brescia in Cagliari's opening league match of the season; it was later revealed that he had injured the ACL and meniscus in his right knee, and would be ruled out for at least three months.

== International career ==
On 27 August 2016, Pavoletti was called up to the Italy senior squad by manager Gian Piero Ventura for a friendly against France on 1 September and a 2018 World Cup qualification match on 5 September against Israel.

On 15 March 2019, Pavoletti received an international call up from Roberto Mancini for the team's UEFA Euro 2020 qualifying matches against Finland and Liechtenstein. On 26 March, Pavoletti made his debut for the national team, also scoring his first goal, the final goal of a 6–0 home win over Liechtenstein.

== Style of play ==
Pavoletti has been described as a large, direct, and "old fashioned" centre-forward, due to his hold-up play with his back to goal and, in particular, his ability in the air, as well as the fact that he mainly operates in the penalty area; however, he is also known for his movement across the entire attacking area of the pitch. His height, combined with his heading accuracy, timing, and elevation give him an edge in winning aerial challenges; as such, many of his goals are from headers, and he often functions as a target-man. A tall, physically strong, determined, and hard-working right-footed striker, although he is neither particularly quick nor particularly skilful from a technical standpoint, he is known for his intelligent attacking movement, positional sense, and eye for goal, as well as his link-up play, and his ability to get on the end of his teammates' crosses and finish off chances in the six-yard box with his head as well as either foot. (Note: See)

== Career statistics ==
=== Club ===
As of match played 15 March 2026

Appearances and goals by club, season and competition
Club	Season	League			National cup		Continental		Other		Total	
Club	Season	Division	Apps	Goals	Apps	Goals	Apps	Goals	Apps	Goals	Apps	Goals
Juve Stabia	2010–11	Lega Pro	8	0	0	0	—		—		8	0
Virtus Lanciano	2011–12	Lega Pro	33	15	3	1	—		—		36	16
Sassuolo	2012–13	Serie B	33	11	2	0	—		—		35	11
Sassuolo	2013–14	Serie A	2	0	1	1	—		—		3	1
Sassuolo	2014–15	Serie A	9	1	3	0	—		—		12	1
Sassuolo	Total		44	12	6	1	0	0	0	0	50	13
Varese (loan)	2013–14	Serie B	36	20	1	0	—		2	4	39	24
Genoa	2014–15	Serie A	10	6	0	0	—		—		10	6
Genoa	2015–16	Serie A	25	14	1	1	—		—		26	15
Genoa	2016–17	Serie A	9	3	1	1	—		—		10	4
Genoa	Total		44	23	2	2	0	0	0	0	46	25
Napoli	2016–17	Serie A	6	0	4	0	—		—		10	0
Cagliari (loan)	2017–18	Serie A	33	11	0	0	—		—		33	11
Cagliari	2018–19	Serie A	32	16	2	2	—		—		34	18
Cagliari	2019–20	Serie A	2	0	1	0	—		—		3	0
Cagliari	2020–21	Serie A	31	4	3	0	—		—		34	4
Cagliari	2021–22	Serie A	33	5	2	0	—		—		35	6
Cagliari	2022–23	Serie B	26	7	2	0	—		—		28	7
Cagliari	2023–24	Serie A	19	4	1	0	—		—		20	4
Cagliari	2024–25	Serie A	26	2	2	1	—		—		28	3
Cagliari	2025–26	Serie A	13	1	1	0	—		—		14	1
Cagliari	Total		215	50	13	3	0	0	0	0	228	53
Career total			386	120	29	7	0	0	2	4	417	131

=== International ===
As of 26 March 2019

Appearances and goals by national team and year
National team	Year	Apps	Goals
Italy	2019	1	1
Total		1	1

Scores and results list Italy's goal tally first, score column indicates score after each Pavoletti goal.

List of international goals scored by Leonardo Pavoletti
No.	Date	Venue	Opponent	Score	Result	Competition
1	26 March 2019	Stadio Ennio Tardini, Parma, Italy	Liechtenstein	6–0	6–0	UEFA Euro 2020 qualification

== Honours ==
Sassuolo

- Serie B: 2012–13

Individual

- Lega Pro Prima Divisione Top Scorer: 2011–12 (15 goals)
