= Francesco Verde (footballer) =

Italian footballer

Personal information
- Date of birth: 16 August 1999 (age 27)
- Place of birth: Aversa, Italy
- Height: 1.87 m (6 ft 2 in)
- Position: Forward

Team information
- Current team: Prato
- Number: 19

Youth career
- –2018: Brescia
- 2016–2017: → Lumezzane (loan)
- 2018–: Cagliari

Senior career*
| Years | Team | Apps | (Gls) |
| 2016–2018 | Brescia | 0 | (0) |
| 2016–2017 | → Lumezzane (loan) | 3 | (0) |
| 2018–2019 | Cagliari | 1 | (0) |
| 2019–2021 | Olbia | 13 | (0) |
| 2020–2021 | → Audace Cerignola (loan) | 26 | (4) |
| 2021 | → Forlì (loan) | 11 | (1) |
| 2021–2022 | Tritium | 12 | (1) |
| 2022–2023 | Real Forte Querceta | 37 | (13) |
| 2023–2024 | Giana Erminio | 31 | (2) |
| 2024–2025 | Clodiense | 18 | (1) |
| 2025 | Cavese | 9 | (1) |
| 2025– | Prato | 2 | (0) |
- * Club domestic league appearances and goals as of 14 September 2025

Francesco Verde (born 16 August 1999) is an Italian football player who plays for Serie D club Prato.

== Club career ==
He is the product of youth teams of Brescia and started playing for their Under-19 squad in the 2015–16 season. He was loaned to Serie C club Lumezzane for the 2016–17 season. He made his Serie C debut for Lumezzane on 19 November 2016 in a game against Sambenedettese, as a 76th-minute substitute for Antonio Bacio Terracino. Upon his return from loan, he continued to play for Brescia's U-19 squad.

On 13 August 2018, he signed with Cagliari.

He made his Serie A debut for Cagliari on 24 February 2019 in a game against Sampdoria, as a 79th-minute substitute for Riccardo Doratiotto.

On 14 July 2019, he signed a 3-year contract with Olbia. On 4 August 2021, he was loaned to Serie D club Forlì.

On 13 July 2023, Verde joined Giana Erminio.
