= Riccardo Doratiotto =

Italian football player

Personal information
- Date of birth: 7 June 1999 (age 27)
- Place of birth: Cagliari, Italy
- Height: 1.78 m (5 ft 10 in)
- Position: Forward

Team information
- Current team: San Donato Tavarnelle

Youth career
- –2019: Cagliari

Senior career*
Years	Team	Apps	(Gls)
2019	Cagliari	1	(0)
2019–2021	Olbia	34	(2)
2021–2022	Aquila	10	(0)
2022	Arezzo	12	(3)
2022–2023	Città di Castello	31	(4)
2023–2024	Albalonga	28	(3)
2024–	San Donato Tavarnelle	6	(0)
- * Club domestic league appearances and goals as of 17 November 2024

Riccardo Doratiotto (born 7 June 1999) is an Italian football player who plays for Serie D club San Donato Tavarnelle.

== Club career ==
He made his Serie A debut for Cagliari on 24 February 2019 in a game against Sampdoria, as a starter.

On 6 July 2019, he signed a 2-year contract with Olbia.

On 4 February 2022, Doratiotto signed with Arezzo in Serie D.

== Personal life ==
His twin brother Fabio Doratiotto was raised in youth teams of Lecce and plays in Serie D for Arzachena, as of January 2022.
