= Rolando Maran =

Italian footballer and manager (born 1963)

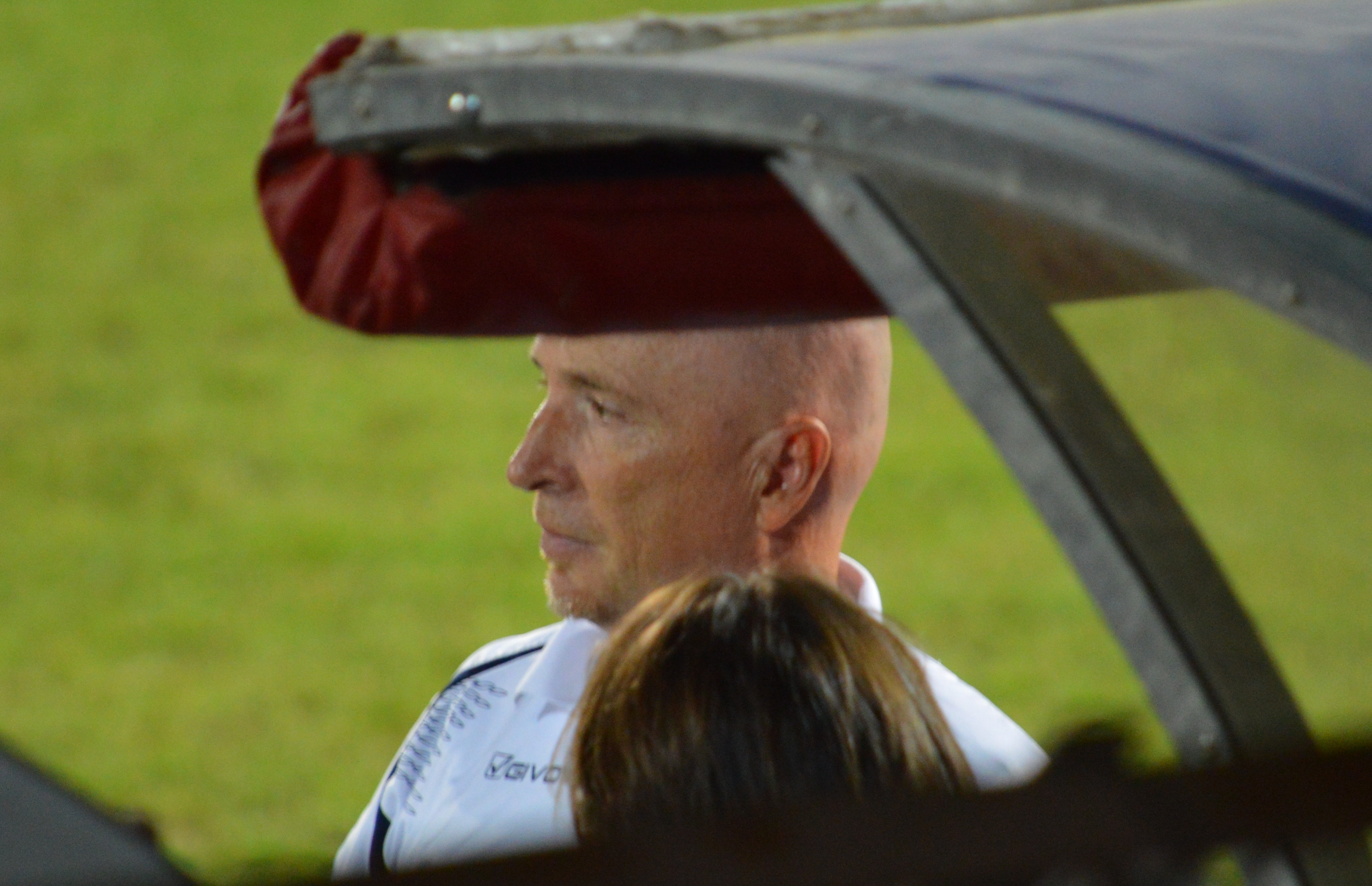
- Maran with Chievo in 2015

Personal information
- Full name: Rolando Maran
- Date of birth: 14 July 1963 (age 63)
- Place of birth: Trento, Italy
- Position: Defender

Team information
- Current team: Albania (head coach)

Senior career*
Years	Team	Apps	(Gls)
1983–1986	Benacense Riva	87	(7)
1986–1995	Chievo	280	(11)
1995	Valdagno	10	(0)
1995–1996	Carrarese	23	(0)
1996–1997	Fano	28	(2)
Total		428	(20)

Managerial career
- 2002–2005: Cittadella
- 2005–2006: Brescia
- 2006–2007: Bari
- 2007–2009: Triestina
- 2009–2010: Vicenza
- 2010–2011: Vicenza
- 2011–2012: Varese
- 2012–2013: Catania
- 2014: Catania
- 2014–2018: Chievo
- 2018–2020: Cagliari
- 2020: Genoa
- 2022: Pisa
- 2023–2024: Brescia
- 2026–: Albania
- * Club domestic league appearances and goals

Rolando Maran (born 14 July 1963) is an Italian professional football manager, currently serving as the head coach of the Albania national team.

His playing career as a defender was spent mostly with Chievo. He then managed several Serie B clubs, and after losing the promotion play-off final with Varese in 2012, had his first Serie A job with Catania.

Maran led Catania to a best-ever 8th place in his first season. Also in the top flight, he had four seasons in charge of Chievo before leading Cagliari from 2018 to 2020.

== Playing career ==
Maran played for Benacense Riva, Chievo, Valdagno, Carrarese and Fano. He spent nine years at Chievo from 1986 to 1995.

== Coaching career ==
=== Serie B ===
After retiring as a player in 1997, Maran started his coaching career in 1997 at his former side Chievo as a coach, he joined Brescia as a youth coach in 1998 and stayed there for two years before becoming the youth coach at Cittadella in 2000. Two years later, he became that club's first-team manager.

Maran became manager of newly relegated Serie B club Brescia on 5 July 2005 on a one-year contract. The following 5 March, with the team in 5th, he was replaced by Zdenek Zeman.

He joined Serie B club Bari in 2006, where he was sacked and replaced by Giuseppe Materazzi in February 2007 with the team in 13th.

Maran joined Triestina in June 2007, and two years later he joined fellow Serie B side Vicenza. He helped them avoid relegation. On 15 June 2010, his contract was extended for a further two years, but he was dismissed just under a year later.

In October 2011, Maran joined struggling Varese, replacing Benito Carbone as head coach. He led them to the playoffs; however they lost out on promotion to Serie A to Sampdoria, 4–2 on aggregate.

=== Serie A years ===
On 11 June 2012, Maran joined Serie A club Catania. He took them to 8th place in a record-breaking season where they accrued 56 points from 38 matches. The season also saw Catania take a record number of home wins in one season, its record number of victories overall in a single top flight campaign, as well as its record points total in Serie A for the fifth consecutive season.

Maran was dismissed on 20 October 2013 after a 1–2 loss to Cagliari that left Catania in the relegation zone, and replaced by Luigi De Canio. He returned on 15 January, before being sacked for the second time later on 6 April, after five defeats in a row and with the team bottom of the league.

On 19 October 2014, Maran was named new head coach of former club Chievo, replacing Eugenio Corini. He was sacked on 29 April 2018, weeks before the end of his contract; the team was on the brink of the relegation zone having taken 11 points from the last 21 games.

On 7 June 2018, Maran was appointed manager of Cagliari on a two-year contract. His side won seven of their first 12 games to challenge for a Champions League place in November; the only time the Sardinians had started so well was when they won the league for the only time in 1969–70. This form did not continue into the second half of the season, and on 3 March 2020, he was fired by Cagliari after a run of 12 consecutive games without a league win.

On 26 August 2020, Maran signed a two-year contract with Genoa. On 21 December 2020, Maran was sacked.

=== Back to Serie B: Pisa and Brescia ===
On 23 June 2022, Serie B club Pisa announced to have hired Maran as their new head coach. He was however sacked on 19 September 2022, leaving Pisa at the bottom of the league table after six games.

On 14 November 2023, Maran was hired by Brescia as their new head coach for the ongoing season. He was dismissed on 9 December 2024, following a 1–2 loss against Catanzaro.

=== Albania national team ===
On 19 May 2026, Maran was unveiled as the new head coach of the Albania national team, signing a two-year contract. On 15 November, Albania confirmed their promotion to League B of the UEFA Nations League after topping their group with 15 points.

== Managerial statistics ==
As of match played 15 November 2026

Managerial record by team and tenure
Team	Nat	From	To	Record							
Team	Nat	From	To	G	W	D	L	GF	GA	GD	Win %
Cittadella	(Italy)	1 July 2002	3 July 2005	131	49	43	39	157	133	+24	37.40
Brescia	(Italy)	4 July 2005	5 March 2006	36	15	14	7	51	33	+18	41.67
Bari	(Italy)	7 June 2006	25 February 2007	25	7	8	10	21	23	−2	28.00
Triestina	(Italy)	13 June 2007	15 June 2009	89	31	25	33	111	117	−6	34.83
Vicenza	(Italy)	16 June 2009	28 March 2010	33	9	12	12	33	33	+0	27.27
Vicenza	(Italy)	15 April 2010	6 June 2011	52	20	12	20	53	61	−8	38.46
Varese	(Italy)	1 October 2011	11 June 2012	39	20	9	10	60	40	+20	51.28
Catania	(Italy)	11 June 2012	20 October 2013	50	18	14	18	61	64	−3	36.00
Catania	(Italy)	16 January 2014	6 April 2014	13	1	4	8	11	23	−12	7.69
Chievo	(Italy)	19 October 2014	29 April 2018	148	44	41	63	149	196	−47	29.73
Cagliari	(Italy)	7 June 2018	3 March 2020	69	22	19	28	86	104	−18	31.88
Genoa	(Italy)	26 August 2020	21 December 2020	15	3	4	8	17	28	−11	20.00
Pisa	(Italy)	23 June 2022	19 September 2022	7	0	2	5	8	15	−7	0.00
Brescia	(Italy)	14 November 2023	9 December 2024	32	12	11	9	43	37	+6	37.50
Albania	(Albania)	19 May 2026	Present	8	5	0	3	12	5	+7	62.50
Career total				747	256	218	273	873	912	−39	34.27
