= Fabio Pisacane =

Italian footballer

- Pisacane in 2025

Personal information
- Date of birth: 28 January 1986 (age 40)
- Place of birth: Naples, Italy
- Position: Defender

Team information
- Current team: Cagliari (head coach)

Youth career
- Genoa

Senior career*
Years	Team	Apps	(Gls)
2005–2008	Genoa	1	(0)
2005–2006	→ Ravenna (loan)	12	(0)
2006–2007	→ Cremonese loan)	20	(0)
2007–2008	→ Lanciano (loan)	23	(0)
2008	Chievo	0	(0)
2008–2011	Lumezzane	56	(5)
2009–2010	→ Ancona (loan)	22	(0)
2011–2013	Ternana	39	(3)
2013–2015	Avellino	80	(1)
2015–2021	Cagliari	151	(4)
2021–2022	Lecce	10	(0)
Total		414	(13)

International career
2006	Italy U20 "C"	3	(0)

Managerial career
- 2025–: Cagliari
- * Club domestic league appearances and goals as of 8 February 2022

Fabio Pisacane (born 28 January 1986) is an Italian football coach and former player, who played as a defender, who is the head coach of Serie A club Cagliari.

== Playing career ==
Pisacane started his career at Genoa, where he was initially a member of the team's youth system. At the age of 14, he was diagnosed with Guillain-Barré syndrome, which seriously threatened his career, as it caused him to experience temporary paralysis in his limbs. After recovering, he was promoted to the reserve side, where he remained from 2003 to 2005. He made his professional debut during the 2005–06 season, while on loan with Ravenna. After several seasons in Serie C, he was signed by Chievo on a free transfer in 2008, but joined Lumezzane in a co-ownership deal, along with his Chievo teammates Tommaso Chiecchi and Amedeo Calliari. During the 2009–10 season, he left for Serie B side Ancona. During the 2010–11 season, he remained at Lumezzane along with Francesco Checcucci.

In June 2011, Lumezzane purchased the remaining 50% registration rights for Pisacane from Chievo, while Chievo bought back Checcucci. In his sole season with Lumezzane, he refused €50,000 to defeat his own team against Ravenna, becoming a hero, along with Simone Farina, of the illegal betting war; the two players were later rewarded by being named FIFA ambassadors in 2012, while Pisacane was even invited by manager Cesare Prandelli to train with the Italy national football team later that year. In August 2011, he terminated his contract with Lumezzane. The next day, he was signed by Ternana on a one-year contract, rejoining former teammate Davide Carcuro. He won Lega Pro Prima Divisione and was the losing side of Supercoppa di Lega di Prima Divisione. On 14 June 2012, he extended his contract. On 11 July 2013, he was signed by Avellino, where he remained for two seasons.

On 14 July 2015, he was signed by Cagliari. He helped the club obtain promotion to Serie A during his first season with the side, and subsequently made his Serie A debut in a 3–0 win over Atalanta, on 18 September 2016 the following season, at the age of 30; having finally achieved his childhood dream of playing in the top Italian division, he was moved to tears during the post-match interview. In 2016, Pisacane was named the inaugural winner of The Guardian's Footballer of the Year award, which is given to "a player who has done something truly remarkable, whether by overcoming adversity, helping others or setting a sporting example by acting with exceptional honesty".

On 19 January 2021, Pisacane signed with Serie B club Lecce. He made 10 appearances with the giallorossi in 2020–21 Serie B season, but was left out of the squad for the next season. On 8 February 2022, his contract with the club was terminated by mutual consent.

== Coaching career ==
=== Assistant and youth coach ===
On 8 June 2022, Pisacane took on his first non-playing role, signing for Cagliari as a technical collaborator to new head coach Fabio Liverani. In July 2023, Pisacane was appointed as the new head coach of Cagliari Primavera, the Under-19 youth team of the Rossoblu. On 9 April 2025, Pisacane led Cagliari Primavera to win the Coppa Italia Primavera title after defeating AC Milan in the final. On 11 June 2025, Cagliari announced the appointment of Pisacane as the new head coach of the Serie A first team, replacing Davide Nicola.

== Managerial statistics ==
As of match played 21 November 2026

Managerial record by team and tenure
Team	Nat.	From	To	Record							
Team	Nat.	From	To	G	W	D	L	GF	GA	GD	Win %
Cagliari	(Italy)	11 June 2025	present	55	18	13	24	58	75	−17	32.73
Career Total				55	18	13	24	58	75	−17	32.73

== Honours ==
=== Individual ===
- The Guardian Footballer of the Year: 2016

=== Manager ===
Cagliari

- Coppa Italia Primavera: 2024–25
