= Daniele Ragatzu =

Italian footballer (born 1991)

Personal information
- Date of birth: 21 September 1991 (age 35)
- Place of birth: Cagliari, Italy
- Height: 1.72 m (5 ft 8 in)
- Position: Striker

Team information
- Current team: Olbia
- Number: 10

Youth career
- Cagliari

Senior career*
| Years | Team | Apps | (Gls) |
| 2008–2012 | Cagliari | 32 | (4) |
| 2011–2012 | → Gubbio (loan) | 28 | (1) |
| 2013–2014 | Verona | 0 | (0) |
| 2013 | → Pro Vercelli (loan) | 17 | (3) |
| 2014 | → Lanciano (loan) | 9 | (0) |
| 2014–2015 | Pro Vercelli | 7 | (0) |
| 2015–2016 | Rimini | 17 | (4) |
| 2016–2018 | Olbia | 55 | (20) |
| 2018–2020 | Cagliari | 13 | (1) |
| 2018–2019 | → Olbia (loan) | 47 | (13) |
| 2020–2024 | Olbia | 137 | (55) |
| 2024 | Pontedera | 12 | (0) |
| 2025– | Olbia | 39 | (12) |

International career
| 2006–2007 | Italy U-16 | 12 | (6) |
| 2007–2008 | Italy U-17 | 7 | (3) |
- * Club domestic league appearances and goals as of 8 March 2025

Daniele Ragatzu (born 21 September 1991) is an Italian professional footballer who plays as a striker for Serie D club Olbia.

== Club career ==
=== Cagliari ===
A Sardinian native, Ragatzu was a youth product of Cagliari Calcio. He made his first senior appearance in Serie A on 1 March 2009 against Torino; on 10 April he scored his first Serie A goal against Fiorentina. In the 2009–10 season Ragatzu scored 2 goals in Serie A, one against Milan on 3 April 2010.

=== Verona ===
On 8 January 2013, Ragatzu was signed by Verona in a 1 1/2-year contract. In the same transfer window he left for Pro Vercelli.

Verona won promotion to Serie A in 2013 as the runner-up of the second level. Ragatzu was awarded no.32 shirt for Verona in 2013–14 Serie A season.

However, on 20 January 2014 Ragatzu left for Serie B club Lanciano in a temporary deal.

=== Pro Vercelli ===
In summer 2014 Ragatzu was transferred to Pro Vercelli.

Ragatzu picked no.23 shirt for Pro Vercelli in 2014–15 Serie B.

=== Rimini ===
On 17 July 2015, Ragatzu and Pro Vercelli agreed to terminate the player contract between the two parties. Ragatzu was signed by Rimini in the same transfer window. Ragatzu had an operation on his left leg on 1 February 2016.

At the end of season Rimini was expelled from professional league due to financial difficulties.

=== Olbia ===
Ragatzu joined Lega Pro newcomer Olbia on 16 July 2016.

=== Return to Cagliari ===
On 29 January 2018, he signed a contract with Cagliari until 2021, who immediately loaned him back to Olbia until 30 June 2019.

=== Return to Olbia ===
He returned to Olbia on 10 November 2020 until the end of the 2020–21 season. On 14 May 2021, he extended his contract for the 2021–22 season.

=== Pontedera ===
On 2 July 2024, Ragatzu moved to Pontedera. The contract was terminated by mutual consent on 11 December 2024.

=== Return to Olbia ===
On 21 January 2025, Ragatzu returned to Olbia for the third time, this time playing in Serie D.
