= 2021–22 Cagliari Calcio season =

Cagliari
2021–22 season
- Owner: Tommaso Giulini
- President: Tommaso Giulini
- Head coach: Leonardo Semplici (until 14 September); Walter Mazzarri (from 15 September to 2 May); Alessandro Agostini (caretaker, from 2 May)
- Stadium: Unipol Domus
- Serie A: 18th (relegated)
- Coppa Italia: Round of 16
- Top goalscorer: League: João Pedro (13); All: João Pedro (13)
Home colours	Away colours	Third colours

The 2021–22 season was the 102nd season in the existence of Cagliari Calcio and the club's sixth consecutive season in the top flight of Italian football. In addition to the domestic league, Cagliari participated in this season's edition of the Coppa Italia.

== Players ==
=== First-team squad ===
Note: Flags indicate national team as defined under FIFA eligibility rules; some limited exceptions apply. Players may hold more than one non-FIFA nationality.

No.	Pos.	Nation	Player
1	GK	ITA	Simone Aresti
3	DF	ITA	Edoardo Goldaniga
4	MF	ITA	Daniele Baselli
6	MF	CRO	Marko Rog
8	MF	ROU	Răzvan Marin
9	FW	SEN	Keita Baldé
10	MF	ITA	João Pedro (captain)
12	DF	ITA	Raoul Bellanova (on loan from Bordeaux)
14	MF	ITA	Alessandro Deiola
15	DF	ITA	Giorgio Altare
16	MF	NED	Kevin Strootman (on loan from Marseille)
18	MF	URU	Nahitan Nández
19	FW	ITA	Luca Gagliano
20	MF	URU	Gastón Pereiro
22	DF	GRE	Charalampos Lykogiannis

No.	Pos.	Nation	Player
23	DF	ITA	Luca Ceppitelli
25	DF	ITA	Gabriele Zappa
26	MF	ITA	Nicolò Cavuoti
27	MF	ITA	Alberto Grassi (on loan from Parma)
28	GK	ITA	Alessio Cragno
29	DF	BRA	Dalbert Henrique (on loan from Inter Milan)
30	FW	ITA	Leonardo Pavoletti
31	GK	SRB	Boris Radunović
32	FW	COL	Damir Ceter
33	DF	SVK	Adam Obert
38	FW	ITA	Jacopo Desogus
39	MF	GRE	Christos Kourfalidis
40	DF	POL	Sebastian Walukiewicz
44	DF	ITA	Andrea Carboni
66	DF	ITA	Matteo Lovato (on loan from Atalanta)

=== Out on loan ===
As of 31 January 2022

Note: Flags indicate national team as defined under FIFA eligibility rules; some limited exceptions apply. Players may hold more than one non-FIFA nationality.

No.	Pos.	Nation	Player
—	GK	ITA	Guglielmo Vicario (at Empoli until 30 June 2022)
—	DF	ITA	Paolo Cusumano (at Vis Pesaro until 30 June 2022)
—	DF	ITA	Paolo Faragò (at Lecce until 30 June 2022)
—	DF	CGO	Senna Miangué (at Cercle Brugge until 30 June 2022)
—	DF	ITA	Alessandro Tripaldelli (at SPAL until 30 June 2022)
—	MF	ITA	Roberto Biancu (at Olbia until 30 June 2022)
—	MF	ITA	Riccardo Ladinetti (at Olbia until 30 June 2022)

No.	Pos.	Nation	Player
—	MF	ITA	Federico Marigosu (at Grosseto until 30 June 2022)
—	MF	FRA	Mattéo Tramoni (at Brescia until 30 June 2022)
—	FW	ITA	Alberto Cerri (at Como until 30 June 2022)
—	FW	ITA	Gianluca Contini (at Legnago until 30 June 2022)
—	FW	ITA	Massimiliano Manca (at Olbia until 30 June 2022)
—	FW	ARG	Giovanni Simeone (at Hellas Verona until 30 June 2022)

== Transfers ==
=== In ===
Pos.	Player	Age	Moving from	Fee
GK	(Serbia) Boris Radunović	25	(Italy) Atalanta	€0.3M
DF	(Italy) Giorgio Altare	23	(Italy) Genoa	€0.175M
DF	(Italy) Paolo Faragò	28	(Italy) Bologna	Loan return
DF	(Italy) Gabriele Zappa	21	(Italy) Pescara	€3.5M
DF	(Uruguay) Martín Cáceres	34	(Italy) Fiorentina	Free
MF	(Italy) Riccardo Ladinetti	20	(Italy) Olbia	Loan return
MF	(Uruguay) Christian Oliva	25	(Spain) Valencia	Loan return
MF	(Romania) Răzvan Marin	25	(Netherlands) Ajax	€10M
FW	(Senegal) Keita Baldé	26	(France) Monaco	€8M
FW	(Colombia) Damir Ceter	23	(Italy) Pescara	Loan return
FW	(Brazil) Diego Farias	31	(Italy) Spezia	Loan return

==== Loans in ====
Pos.	Player	Age	Moving from	Fee	Notes
DF	(Italy) Raoul Bellanova	21	(France) Bordeaux	N/A	On loan until June 2022
DF	(Brazil) Dalbert	28	(Italy) Internazionale	N/A	On loan until June 2022
MF	(Italy) Alberto Grassi	26	(Italy) Parma	N/A	On loan until June 2022
MF	(Netherlands) Kevin Strootman	31	(France) Marseille	N/A	On loan until June 2022
DF	(Italy) Matteo Lovato	21	(Italy) Atalanta	N/A	On loan until June 2022

=== Out ===
Pos.	Player	Age	Moving to	Fee
DF	(Italy) Arturo Calabresi	25	(Italy) Bologna	Loan ended
DF	(Estonia) Ragnar Klavan	35	(Estonia) Paide Linnameeskond	Free
DF	(Italy) Simone Pinna	23	(Italy) Olbia	Free
DF	(Italy) Daniele Rugani	27	(Italy) Juventus	Loan ended
MF	(Ghana) Kwadwo Asamoah	32		Free
MF	(Ghana) Alfred Duncan	28	(Italy) Fiorentina	Loan ended
MF	(Belgium) Radja Nainggolan	33	(Italy) Internazionale	Loan ended
MF	(Bulgaria) Kiril Despodov	24	(Bulgaria) Ludogorets Razgrad	€2M
FW	(Italy) Riccardo Sottil	22	(Italy) Fiorentina	Loan ended
FW	(Croatia) Filip Bradarić	29	(Saudi Arabia) Al-Ahli	€2.7M
DF	(Uruguay) Diego Godín	35	(Brazil) Atlético Mineiro	Free

=== Loans out ===
Pos.	Player	Age	Moving to	Fee	Notes
GK	(Italy) Guglielmo Vicario	24	(Italy) Empoli	N/A	On loan until June 2022
DF	(Italy) Alessandro Tripaldelli	23	(Italy) SPAL	N/A	On loan until June 2022
DF	(Belgium) Senna Miangué	24	(Italy) Cercle Brugge	N/A	On loan until June 2022
MF	(France) Mattéo Tramoni	21	(Italy) Brescia	N/A	On loan until June 2022
MF	(Italy) Federico Marigosu	20	(Italy) Grosseto	N/A	On loan until June 2022
MF	(Italy) Roberto Biancu	21	(Italy) Olbia	N/A	On loan until June 2022
MF	(Italy) Fabrizio Caligara	21	(Italy) Ascoli	N/A	On loan until June 2022
FW	(Italy) Alberto Cerri	25	(Italy) Como	N/A	On loan until June 2022
FW	(Angola) Zito Luvumbo	19	(Italy) Como	N/A	On loan until June 2022
FW	(Argentina) Giovanni Simeone	26	(Italy) Hellas Verona	N/A	On loan until June 2022
FW	(Italy) Luca Gagliano	21	(Italy) Avellino	N/A	On loan until June 2022

== Pre-season and friendlies ==
Win Draw Loss

17 July 2021 Friendly	Real Vicenza (Italy)	1–16	(Italy) Cagliari	Trentino, Italy
17:00 CEST (UTC+2)	Candelaresi 90'	Report	Simeone 6', 16', 25', 35', 39'; Personi 18' (o.g.); João Pedro 19', 22' (pen.), 36'; Pereiro 45'; Ceter 47', 56', 78'; Cerri 57', 59', 70'	Stadium: Campo Calcio Celledizzo; Referee: Daniele Perenzoni

24 July 2021 Friendly	Vicenza (Italy)	0–3	(Italy) Cagliari	Vicenza, Italy
16:00 CEST (UTC+2)		Report	Marin 16'; Pavoletti 50'; Dalbert 61'	Stadium: Stadio Romeo Menti; Attendance: 800; Referee: Mario Saugo

31 July 2021 Friendly	FC Augsburg (Germany)	3–1	(Italy) Cagliari	Augsburg, Germany
15:30 CEST (UTC+2)	Vargas 17', 40'; Jensen 37'; Gregoritsch (yellow card) 78'; Dell'Erba (yellow card) 87'	Report	João Pedro (yellow card) 16', (goal) 82'; Dalbert (yellow card) 25'; Strootman (yellow card) 41'	Stadium: WWK Arena; Attendance: 4,500; Referee: Michael Bacher

4 August 2021 Friendly	Olbia (Italy)	0–3	(Italy) Cagliari	Aritzo, Italy
17:30 CEST (UTC+2)		Report	Biancu 5'; Ceter 56' (pen.); Marin 60'	Stadium: Stadio Del Vento; Attendance: 250; Referee: Antonio Giua

7 August 2021 Trofeu Ciutat de Palma	Mallorca (Spain)	1–0	(Italy) Cagliari	Palma, Spain
20:30 CEST (UTC+2)	Rodríguez 40'	Report		Stadium: Iberostar Estadi; Attendance: 5,000; Referee: Adrián Cordero Vega

== Competitions ==
=== Overall record ===
Competition	First match	Last match	Starting round	Final position	Record							
Competition	First match	Last match	Starting round	Final position	Pld	W	D	L	GF	GA	GD	Win %
Serie A	22 August 2021	22 May 2022	Matchday 1	18th	38	6	12	20	34	68	−34	15.79
Coppa Italia	14 August 2021	19 January 2022	First round	Round of 16	3	2	0	1	6	3	+3	66.67
Total					41	8	12	21	40	71	−31	19.51

Source: Soccerway

=== Serie A ===
==== League table ====
Pos	Team	Pld	W	D	L	GF	GA	GD	Pts	Qualification or relegation
16	Spezia	38	10	6	22	41	71	−30	36	
17	Salernitana	38	7	10	21	33	78	−45	31	
18	Cagliari (R)	38	6	12	20	34	68	−34	30	Relegation to Serie B
19	Genoa (R)	38	4	16	18	27	60	−33	28	Relegation to Serie B
20	Venezia (R)	38	6	9	23	34	69	−35	27	Relegation to Serie B

Source: Serie A
Rules for classification: 1) Points; 2) Head-to-head points; 3) Head-to-head goal difference; 4) Goal difference; 5) Goals scored; 6) Draw. (Note: Head-to-head record is used only after all the matches between the teams in question have been played)
(R) Relegated

==== Results summary ====
Overall								Home						Away					
Pld	W	D	L	GF	GA	GD	Pts	W	D	L	GF	GA	GD	W	D	L	GF	GA	GD
38	6	12	20	34	68	−34	30	3	6	10	20	33	−13	3	6	10	14	35	−21

Source: Serie A

==== Results by round ====
Round	1	2	3	4	5	6	7	8	9	10	11	12	13	14	15	16	17	18	19	20	21	22	23	24	25	26	27	28	29	30	31	32	33	34	35	36	37	38
Ground	H	A	H	A	H	A	H	H	A	H	A	H	A	H	A	H	A	H	A	A	H	A	H	A	A	H	A	H	A	H	A	H	H	A	H	A	H	A
Result	D	L	L	D	L	L	D	W	L	L	L	L	D	D	D	D	L	L	L	W	W	L	D	W	D	D	W	L	L	L	L	L	W	L	L	D	L	D
Position	9	14	17	19	19	19	20	19	19	20	20	20	19	19	19	18	19	19	19	18	18	18	18	17	17	17	17	17	17	17	17	17	17	17	18	18	18	18

Source: Serie A
A = Away; H = Home; W = Win; D = Draw; L = Loss

==== Matches ====
The league fixtures were announced on 14 July 2021.

23 August 2021 1	Cagliari	2–2	Spezia	Cagliari
18:30 CEST (UTC+2)	João Pedro 62', 66' (pen.); Zappa (yellow card) 79'; Strootman (yellow card) 82'	Report	Gyasi 7', (yellow card) 66'; Bastoni (yellow card) 14', (goal) 58'; Nikolaou (yellow card) 45+1'	Stadium: Unipol Domus; Attendance: 5,387; Referee: Francesco Fourneau

29 August 2021 2	Milan	4–1	Cagliari	Milan
20:45 CEST (UTC+2)	Tonali 12'; Leão 17'; Giroud 24', 43' (pen.); Brahim (yellow card) 73'	Report	Dalbert (yellow card) 5'; Deiola 15', (yellow card) 38'; Strootman (yellow card) 41'; Godín (yellow card) 62'; Nández (yellow card) 84'	Stadium: San Siro; Attendance: 31,946; Referee: Marco Serra

12 September 2021 3	Cagliari	2–3	Genoa	Cagliari
15:00 CEST (UTC+2)	João Pedro 16' (pen.), (yellow card) 62'; Ceppitelli (yellow card) 35', (goal) 56'	Report	Biraschi (yellow card) 11'; Sabelli (yellow card) 15'; Kallon (yellow card) 59'; Destro 59'; Fares 69', 78'	Stadium: Unipol Domus; Attendance: 6,423; Referee: Luca Pairetto

19 September 2021 4	Lazio	2–2	Cagliari	Rome
18:00 CEST (UTC+2)	Luiz Felipe (yellow card) 42'; Immobile 45'; Cataldi 83'	Report	Cáceres (yellow card) 6'; João Pedro 46'; Zappa (yellow card) 61' (yellow-red card) 90+4'; Keita 62'	Stadium: Stadio Olimpico; Attendance: 20,000; Referee: Davide Ghersini

22 September 2021 5	Cagliari	0–2	Empoli	Cagliari
20:45 CEST (UTC+2)	Godín (yellow card) 75'; Nández (yellow card) 90+4'	Report	Żurkowski (yellow card) 21'; Di Francesco 29'; Štulac 69'	Stadium: Unipol Domus; Attendance: 7,226; Referee: Marco Di Bello

26 September 2021 6	Napoli	2–0	Cagliari	Naples
20:45 CEST (UTC+2)	Osimhen 11', (yellow card) 66'; Insigne 57' (pen.); Elmas (yellow card) 76'	Report	Walukiewicz (yellow card) 60'	Stadium: Stadio San Paolo; Attendance: 17,723; Referee: Marco Piccinini

1 October 2021 7	Cagliari	1–1	Venezia	Cagliari
20:45 CEST (UTC+2)	Keita 19'; Nández (yellow card) 22'; Strootman (yellow card) 50'	Report	Ceccaroni (yellow card) 23'; Kiyine (yellow card) 30'; Ampadu (yellow card) 52'; Johnsen (yellow card) 68'; Aramu (yellow card) 70'; Busio 90+1'	Stadium: Unipol Domus; Attendance: 8,135; Referee: Manuel Volpi

17 October 2021 8	Cagliari	3–1	Sampdoria	Cagliari
12:30 CEST (UTC+2)	João Pedro 4', 90+4'; Carboni (yellow card) 13'; Deiola (yellow card) 55'; Cáceres 74'; Strootman (yellow card) 86'; Pavoletti (yellow card) 90+1'	Report	Thorsby (yellow card) 51', (goal) 82'; Yoshida (yellow card) 59'	Stadium: Unipol Domus; Attendance: 9,923; Referee: Matteo Marchetti

24 October 2021 9	Fiorentina	3–0	Cagliari	Florence
15:00 CEST (UTC+2)	Biraghi 21' (pen.); González 42'; Vlahović 49'	Report	Keita (yellow card) 20'; Marin (yellow card) 48'	Stadium: Stadio Artemio Franchi; Attendance: 20,290; Referee: Antonio Rapuano

27 October 2021 10	Cagliari	1–2	Roma	Cagliari
20:45 CEST (UTC+2)	Pavoletti 52'; João Pedro (yellow card) 73'; Lykogiannis (yellow card) 77'; Bellanova (yellow card) 87'	Report	Zaniolo (yellow card) 38'; Ibañez 71'; Pellegrini 78', (yellow card) 79'; Abraham (yellow card) 80'; Calafiori (yellow card) 83'	Stadium: Unipol Domus; Attendance: 8,547; Referee: Ivano Pezzuto

1 November 2021 11	Bologna	2–0	Cagliari	Bologna
20:45 CET (UTC+1)	Svanberg (yellow card) 40'; De Silvestri 49'; Hickey (yellow card) 70'; Medel (yellow card) 90+1'; Arnautović 90+6'	Report	João Pedro (yellow card) 68'; Cáceres (red card) 90'; Pavoletti (yellow card) 90+3'	Stadium: Stadio Renato Dall'Ara; Attendance: 10,126; Referee: Davide Massa

6 November 2021 12	Cagliari	1–2	Atalanta	Cagliari
20:45 CET (UTC+1)	Godín (yellow card) 20'; João Pedro 27'	Report	Pašalić 6'; Zapata 43'; Koopmeiners (yellow card) 45'	Stadium: Unipol Domus; Attendance: 6,976; Referee: Marco Piccinini

21 November 2021 13	Sassuolo	2–2	Cagliari	Reggio Emilia
12:30 CET (UTC+1)	Scamacca 37'; Berardi 52' (pen.); Ayhan (yellow card) 72'	Report	Marin (yellow card) 33'; Keita 40'; Grassi (yellow card) 42'; João Pedro 56' (pen.)	Stadium: Mapei Stadium – Città del Tricolore; Attendance: 4,135; Referee: Niccolò Baroni

26 November 2021 14	Cagliari	1–1	Salernitana	Cagliari
20:45 CET (UTC+1)	Grassi (yellow card) 27'; Dalbert (yellow card) 30'; Pavoletti 73', (yellow card) 79'	Report	Veseli (yellow card) 84'; Bonazzoli 90'	Stadium: Unipol Domus; Attendance: 9,700; Referee: Daniele Doveri

30 November 2021 15	Hellas Verona	0–0	Cagliari	Verona
20:45 CET (UTC+1)	Günter (yellow card) 35'; Simeone (yellow card) 49'; Lazović (yellow card) 50'	Report	Keita (yellow card) 50'; Cáceres (yellow card) 88'	Stadium: Stadio Marcantonio Bentegodi; Attendance: 12,188; Referee: Matteo Marcenaro

6 December 2021 16	Cagliari	1–1	Torino	Cagliari
20:45 CET (UTC+1)	Dalbert (yellow card) 18'; João Pedro 53'; Cáceres (yellow card) 59'	Report	Pobega (yellow card) 30'; Carboni 31' (o.g.); Lukić (yellow card) 34'; Buongiorno (yellow card) 48'; Zima (yellow card) 57'	Stadium: Unipol Domus; Attendance: 8,799; Referee: Luca Massimi

12 December 2021 17	Internazionale	4–0	Cagliari	Milan
20:45 CET (UTC+1)	Martínez 29', 68', (yellow card) 33', (penalty missed) 45'; Sánchez 50'; Çalhanoğlu 66'	Report	Cragno (yellow card) 43'; Deiola (yellow card) 76'	Stadium: San Siro; Attendance: 33,712; Referee: Matteo Marchetti

18 December 2021 18	Cagliari	0–4	Udinese	Cagliari
20:45 CET (UTC+1)	Marin (red card) 40'; Dalbert (yellow card) 43'; Bellanova (yellow card) 71'	Report	Makengo 4'; Deulofeu 45', 69', (yellow card) 70'; Molina 50'; Becão (yellow card) 84'	Stadium: Unipol Domus; Attendance: 7,864; Referee: Fabio Maresca

21 December 2021 19	Juventus	2–0	Cagliari	Turin
20:45 CET (UTC+1)	Kean 40'; Bernardeschi 83'	Report	Carboni (yellow card) 24'; Dalbert (yellow card) 35'; Pavoletti (yellow card) 85'	Stadium: Juventus Stadium; Attendance: 11,197; Referee: Federico Dionisi

6 January 2022 20	Sampdoria	1–2	Cagliari	Genoa
12:30 CET (UTC+1)	Gabbiadini 18'; Ekdal (yellow card) 52'; Candreva (red card) 90+1'	Report	Lovato (yellow card) 32'; Deiola 55'; João Pedro (yellow card) 61'; Pavoletti 71'; Carboni (yellow card) 90+2'	Stadium: Stadio Luigi Ferraris; Attendance: 3,188; Referee: Giacomo Camplone

11 January 2022 21	Cagliari	2–1	Bologna	Cagliari
20:45 CET (UTC+1)	Carboni (yellow card) 14'; Altare (yellow card) 19'; Deiola (yellow card) 57'; Pavoletti 71'; Pereiro 90+3'	Report	Theate (yellow card) 15'; Orsolini 54'; De Silvestri (yellow card) 86'	Stadium: Unipol Domus; Attendance: 5,583; Referee: Davide Ghersini

16 January 2022 22	Roma	1–0	Cagliari	Rome
18:00 CET (UTC+1)	Oliveira (yellow card) 23', (goal) 33' (pen.); Mancini (yellow card) 39'; Afena-Gyan (yellow card) 58'	Report	Pavoletti (yellow card) 25'; Carboni (yellow card) 27'; Dalbert (yellow card) 32'; Altare (yellow card) 70'	Stadium: Stadio Olimpico; Attendance: 5,000; Referee: Lorenzo Maggioni

23 January 2022 23	Cagliari	1–1	Fiorentina	Cagliari
12:30 CET (UTC+1)	Altare (yellow card) 10'; João Pedro 47', (penalty missed) 68', (yellow card) 81'; Ceppitelli (yellow card) 86'	Report	Biraghi (penalty missed) 8', (yellow card) 29'; Odriozola (red card) 65'; Sottil 75', (yellow card) 75'; Maleh (yellow card) 89'	Stadium: Unipol Domus; Attendance: 5,000; Referee: Gianluca Aureliano

6 February 2022 24	Atalanta	1–2	Cagliari	Bergamo
12:30 CET (UTC+1)	Musso (red card) 52'; Zappacosta (yellow card) 61'; Palomino 64'	Report	Dalbert (yellow card) 24'; Grassi (yellow card) 35'; Pereiro 50', 68'; Deiola (yellow card) 63'; Cragno (yellow card) 90'; Goldaniga (yellow card) 90+1'	Stadium: Gewiss Stadium; Attendance: 7,868; Referee: Alessandro Prontera

13 February 2022 25	Empoli	1–1	Cagliari	Empoli
15:00 CET (UTC+1)	Stojanović (yellow card) 1'; Pinamonti 38'	Report	João Pedro (yellow card) 40'; Marin (yellow card) 71'; Pavoletti 84'	Stadium: Stadio Carlo Castellani; Attendance: 4,787; Referee: Federico Dionisi

21 February 2022 26	Cagliari	1–1	Napoli	Cagliari
19:00 CET (UTC+1)	João Pedro (yellow card) 35'; Pereiro 58'	Report	Malcuit (yellow card) 42'; Koulibaly (yellow card) 64'; Osimhen 87'	Stadium: Unipol Domus; Attendance: 12,063; Referee: Simone Sozza

27 February 2022 27	Torino	1–2	Cagliari	Turin
12:30 CET (UTC+1)	Pobega (yellow card) 51'; Belotti 54'; Singo (yellow card) 90+1'	Report	Bellanova 21'; Lovato (yellow card) 40'; Deiola 62'; Goldaniga (yellow card) 74'; Pavoletti (yellow card) 90'; Dalbert (yellow card) 90+4'	Stadium: Stadio Olimpico Grande Torino; Attendance: 10,231; Referee: Manuel Volpi

5 March 2022 28	Cagliari	0–3	Lazio	Cagliari
20:45 CET (UTC+1)	Altare (yellow card) 18'; Marin (yellow card) 74'; Lovato (yellow card) 90+2'	Report	Immobile 19' (pen.); Luis Alberto 42'; Felipe Anderson 62'; Marušić (yellow card) 71' (yellow-red card) 89'	Stadium: Unipol Domus; Attendance: 10,873; Referee: Fabio Maresca

12 March 2022 29	Spezia	2–0	Cagliari	La Spezia
15:00 CET (UTC+1)	Verde (penalty missed) 36'; Erlić 55'; Manaj 74', (yellow card) 75'	Report	Pavoletti (yellow card) 30'; João Pedro (yellow card) 45+3'; Goldaniga (yellow card) 75'; Zappa (yellow card) 84'	Stadium: Stadio Alberto Picco; Attendance: 7,180; Referee: Daniele Orsato

19 March 2022 30	Cagliari	0–1	Milan	Cagliari
20:45 CET (UTC+1)	Bellanova (yellow card) 77'	Report	Bennacer 59'	Stadium: Unipol Domus; Attendance: 12,309; Referee: Marco Di Bello

3 April 2022 31	Udinese	5–1	Cagliari	Udine
15:00 CEST (UTC+2)	Becão 38'; Walace (yellow card) 42'; Beto 45', 49', 73'; Molina 59'; Pereyra (yellow card) 61'	Report	Dalbert (yellow card) 20'; João Pedro 32'; Grassi (yellow card) 35' (yellow-red card) 82'; Baselli (yellow card) 59'	Stadium: Stadio Friuli; Attendance: 12,215; Referee: Rosario Abisso

9 April 2022 32	Cagliari	1–2	Juventus	Cagliari
20:45 CEST (UTC+2)	João Pedro 10'; Lykogiannis (yellow card) 53'	Report	De Ligt 45'; Vlahović 75'	Stadium: Unipol Domus; Attendance: 13,437; Referee: Daniele Chiffi

16 April 2022 33	Cagliari	1–0	Sassuolo	Cagliari
12:30 CEST (UTC+2)	Deiola 42'; Lovato (yellow card) 45+5'; Pereiro (yellow card) 90+4'	Report	Ruan (yellow card) 27'; Traorè (yellow card) 45+5'	Stadium: Unipol Domus; Attendance: 14,689; Referee: Davide Massa

24 April 2022 34	Genoa	1–0	Cagliari	Genoa
18:00 CEST (UTC+2)	Destro (yellow card) 49'; Sturaro (yellow card) 61'; Frendrup (yellow card) 84'; Badelj 89'	Report	João Pedro (yellow card) 41'; Grassi (yellow card) 71'	Stadium: Stadio Luigi Ferraris; Attendance: 17,257; Referee: Paolo Valeri

30 April 2022 35	Cagliari	1–2	Hellas Verona	Cagliari
15:00 CEST (UTC+2)	Pavoletti (yellow card) 51'; João Pedro 57'; Carboni (yellow card) 90'	Report	Barák 8', (yellow card) 22'; Tameze (yellow card) 23'; Caprari 44'; Hongla (yellow card) 56'; Simeone (yellow card) 77'	Stadium: Unipol Domus; Attendance: 16,267; Referee: Daniele Orsato

8 May 2022 36	Salernitana	1–1	Cagliari	Salerno
18:00 CEST (UTC+2)	Bohinen (yellow card) 54'; Verdi 68' (pen.); Ribéry (red card) 69'; Zortea (yellow card) 86'; Radovanović (yellow card) 89'; Perotti (yellow card) 90+6'; Gyömbér (yellow card) 90+7'	Report	Pavoletti (yellow card) 63'; Cragno (yellow card) 67'; Radunović (red card) 73'; Altare 90+9'	Stadium: Stadio Arechi; Attendance: 27,396; Referee: Marco Di Bello

15 May 2022 37	Cagliari	1–3	Internazionale	Cagliari
20:45 CEST (UTC+2)	Lykogiannis 53'	Report	Darmian 25', (yellow card) 37'; Martínez 51', 84'; Çalhanoğlu (yellow card) 87'	Stadium: Unipol Domus; Attendance: 15,443; Referee: Daniele Doveri

22 May 2022 38	Venezia	0–0	Cagliari	Venice
21:00 CEST (UTC+2)		Report	Ceppitelli (yellow card) 37'; Nández (yellow card) 59'; Altare (yellow card) 90+3'	Stadium: Stadio Pier Luigi Penzo; Attendance: 5,654; Referee: Fabio Maresca

=== Coppa Italia ===
14 August 2021 First round	Cagliari	3–1	Pisa	Cagliari
21:00 CEST (UTC+2)	Marin 28', (yellow card) 84'; Caracciolo 36' (o.g.); Deiola 45+3'; Zappa (yellow card) 51'	Report	Masucci 67'; Touré (yellow card) 82'	Stadium: Sardegna Arena; Attendance: 2,620; Referee: Gianluca Manganiello

15 December 2021 Second round	Cagliari	3–1	Cittadella	Cagliari
18:00 CET (UTC+1)	Deiola 16'; Oliva (yellow card) 26'; Ceter 40'; Pereiro 64'	Report	Danzi (yellow card) 27'; Frare (yellow card) 71'; Donnarumma 85'	Stadium: Sardegna Arena; Attendance: 2,797; Referee: Maria Ferrieri

19 January 2022 Round of 16	Sassuolo	1–0	Cagliari	Reggio Emilia
17:30 CET (UTC+1)	Harroui 18'; Ferrari (yellow card) 86'	Report	Obert (yellow card) 53'	Stadium: Mapei Stadium – Città del Tricolore; Attendance: 850; Referee: Matteo Marchetti

== Statistics ==
=== Appearances and goals ===
No.	Pos	Nat	Player	Total		Serie A		Coppa Italia	
No.	Pos	Nat	Player	Apps	Goals	Apps	Goals	Apps	Goals
Goalkeepers
1	GK	(Italy) ITA	Simone Aresti	0	0	0	0	0	0
28	GK	(Italy) ITA	Alessio Cragno	11	0	10	0	1	0
31	GK	(Serbia) SRB	Boris Radunović	1	0	1	0	0	0
Defenders
2	DF	(Uruguay) URU	Diego Godín	8	0	6+1	0	1	0
4	DF	(Uruguay) URU	Martín Cáceres	7	1	5+2	1	0	0
12	DF	(Italy) ITA	Raoul Bellanova	4	0	1+3	0	0	0
15	DF	(Italy) ITA	Giorgio Altare	2	0	0+1	0	0+1	0
22	DF	(Greece) GRE	Charalampos Lykogiannis	11	0	8+2	0	0+1	0
23	DF	(Italy) ITA	Luca Ceppitelli	10	1	6+3	1	0+1	0
25	DF	(Italy) ITA	Gabriele Zappa	10	0	5+4	0	1	0
29	DF	(Brazil) BRA	Dalbert Henrique	7	0	6	0	1	0
33	DF	(Slovakia) SVK	Adam Obert	1	0	0+1	0	0	0
40	DF	(Poland) POL	Sebastian Walukiewicz	6	0	4+1	0	1	0
44	DF	(Italy) ITA	Andrea Carboni	11	0	10	0	1	0
Midfielders
6	MF	(Croatia) CRO	Marko Rog	0	0	0	0	0	0
8	MF	(Romania) ROU	Răzvan Marin	12	1	11	0	1	1
14	MF	(Italy) ITA	Alessandro Deiola	12	2	10+1	1	1	1
16	MF	(Netherlands) NED	Kevin Strootman	8	0	6+1	0	1	0
18	MF	(Uruguay) URU	Nahitan Nández	10	0	9+1	0	0	0
20	MF	(Uruguay) URU	Gastón Pereiro	8	0	0+7	0	0+1	0
21	MF	(Uruguay) URU	Christian Oliva	0	0	0	0	0	0
27	MF	(Italy) ITA	Alberto Grassi	5	0	2+3	0	0	0
Forwards
9	FW	(Senegal) SEN	Keita Baldé	7	2	6+1	2	0	0
10	FW	(Brazil) BRA	João Pedro	12	6	11	6	1	0
17	FW	(Brazil) BRA	Diego Farias	2	0	0+2	0	0	0
30	FW	(Italy) ITA	Leonardo Pavoletti	10	1	4+5	1	1	0
32	FW	(Colombia) COL	Damir Ceter	1	0	0+1	0	0	0
Players transferred out during the season
9	FW	(Argentina) ARG	Giovanni Simeone	2	0	0+1	0	0+1	0
27	FW	(Italy) ITA	Alberto Cerri	0	0	0	0	0	0

Last updated: 1 November 2021
Source: Competitions
