= 2020–21 Cagliari Calcio season =

Cagliari
2020–21 season
- Owner: Tommaso Giulini
- President: Tommaso Giulini
- Head coach: Eusebio Di Francesco (until 22 February); Leonardo Semplici (from 22 February)
- Stadium: Sardegna Arena
- Serie A: 16th
- Coppa Italia: Round of 16
- Top goalscorer: League: João Pedro (16); All: João Pedro (16)
Home colours	Away colours	Third colours
- All statistics correct as of 22 May 2021.

The 2020–21 season was the 101st season in the existence of Cagliari Calcio and the club's fifth consecutive season in the top flight of Italian football. In addition to the domestic league, Cagliari participated in this season's edition of the Coppa Italia. The season covered the period from 2 August 2020 to 30 June 2021.

== Players ==
=== First-team squad ===
As of 9 February 2021.

Note: Flags indicate national team as defined under FIFA eligibility rules; some limited exceptions apply. Players may hold more than one non-FIFA nationality.

No.	Pos.	Nation	Player
1	GK	ITA	Simone Aresti
2	DF	URU	Diego Godín
3	DF	ITA	Alessandro Tripaldelli
4	MF	BEL	Radja Nainggolan (on loan from Inter Milan)
6	MF	CRO	Marko Rog
8	MF	ROU	Răzvan Marin (on loan from Ajax)
9	FW	ARG	Giovanni Simeone
10	MF	BRA	João Pedro (captain)
14	MF	ITA	Alessandro Deiola
15	DF	EST	Ragnar Klavan
16	DF	ITA	Arturo Calabresi (on loan from Bologna)
17	MF	FRA	Mattéo Tramoni
18	MF	URU	Nahitan Nández
19	MF	GHA	Kwadwo Asamoah

No.	Pos.	Nation	Player
20	MF	URU	Gastón Pereiro
22	DF	GRE	Charalampos Lykogiannis
23	DF	ITA	Luca Ceppitelli
24	DF	ITA	Daniele Rugani (on loan from Juventus)
25	DF	ITA	Gabriele Zappa (on loan from Pescara)
26	FW	ANG	Zito Luvumbo
27	FW	ITA	Alberto Cerri
28	GK	ITA	Alessio Cragno
30	FW	ITA	Leonardo Pavoletti
31	GK	ITA	Guglielmo Vicario
32	MF	GHA	Alfred Duncan (on loan from Fiorentina)
33	FW	ITA	Riccardo Sottil (on loan from Fiorentina)
40	DF	POL	Sebastian Walukiewicz
44	DF	ITA	Andrea Carboni

=== Out on loan ===
As of 10 February 2021

Note: Flags indicate national team as defined under FIFA eligibility rules; some limited exceptions apply. Players may hold more than one non-FIFA nationality.

No.	Pos.	Nation	Player
—	DF	ITA	Paolo Faragò (at Bologna until 30 June 2021)
—	DF	ITA	Simone Pinna (at Ascoli until 30 June 2021)
—	MF	ITA	Federico Marigosu (at Olbia until 30 June 2021)
—	MF	CRO	Filip Bradarić (at Al-Ain FC until 30 June 2021)
—	MF	URU	Christian Oliva (at Valencia until 30 June 2021)

No.	Pos.	Nation	Player
—	FW	BUL	Kiril Despodov (at Ludogorets until 30 June 2021)
—	FW	ITA	Riccardo Ladinetti (at Olbia until 30 June 2021)
—	FW	BRA	Diego Farias (at Spezia until 30 June 2021)
—	FW	COL	Damir Ceter (at Pescara until 30 June 2021)
—	FW	ITA	Luca Gagliano (at Olbia until 30 June 2021)

== Transfers ==
=== In ===
Pos.	Player	Age	Moving from	Fee
GK	(Italy) Simone Aresti	34	(Italy) Olbia	Free
GK	(Italy) Guglielmo Vicario	23	(Italy) Perugia	Loan return
DF	(Uruguay) Diego Godín	34	(Italy) Internazionale	Free
DF	(Italy) Alessandro Tripaldelli	22	(Italy) Sassuolo	€3M
MF	(France) Mattéo Tramoni	20	(France) AC Ajaccio	€1.5M
MF	(Croatia) Marko Rog	25	(Italy) Napoli	€13M
MF	(Italy) Alessandro Deiola	25	(Italy) Spezia	Loan return
MF	(Ghana) Kwadwo Asamoah	32		Free
FW	(Italy) Alberto Cerri	24	(Italy) SPAL	Loan return
FW	(Angola) Zito Luvumbo	18	(Angola) Primeiro de Agosto	Undisclosed

==== Loans in ====
Pos.	Player	Age	Moving from	Fee	Notes
DF	(Italy) Gabriele Zappa	20	(Italy) Pescara	N/A	On loan until June 2021
DF	(Italy) Arturo Calabresi	24	(Italy) Bologna	N/A	On loan until June 2021
DF	(Italy) Daniele Rugani	26	(Italy) Juventus	N/A	On loan until June 2021
MF	(Romania) Răzvan Marin	24	(Netherlands) Ajax	N/A	On loan until June 2021
MF	(Ghana) Alfred Duncan	27	(Italy) Fiorentina	N/A	On loan until June 2021
MF	(Belgium) Radja Nainggolan	32	(Italy) Internazionale	N/A	On loan until June 2021
FW	(Italy) Riccardo Sottil	21	(Italy) Fiorentina	N/A	On loan until June 2021

=== Out ===
Pos.	Player	Age	Moving from	Fee
GK	(Sweden) Robin Olsen	30	(Italy) A.S. Roma	Loan return
GK	(Brazil) Rafael	38	(Italy) Spezia	Free
DF	(Italy) Fabrizio Cacciatore	33	Released	Free
DF	(Italy) Federico Mattiello	25	(Italy) Atalanta	Loan return
DF	(Italy) Luca Pellegrini	21	(Italy) Juventus	Loan return
DF	(Italy) Filippo Romagna	23	(Italy) Sassuolo	€4M
DF	(Italy) Fabio Pisacane	35	(Italy) Lecce	€0.8M
MF	(Italy) Luca Cigarini	34	(Italy) Crotone	Free
MF	(Moldova) Artur Ioniță	30	(Italy) Benevento	€1M
MF	(Italy) Nicolò Barella	23	(Italy) Internazionale	€25M
MF	(Croatia) Marko Pajač	27	(Italy) Brescia	€0.5M
FW	(Italy) Alberto Paloschi	30	(Italy) SPAL	Loan return
FW	(Italy) Daniele Ragatzu	29	(Italy) Olbia	Free
FW	(Algeria) Adam Ounas	24	(Italy) Napoli	Loan return

=== Loans out ===
Pos.	Player	Age	Moving from	Fee	Notes
DF	(Italy) Paolo Faragò	27	(Italy) Bologna	N/A	On loan until June 2021
DF	(Italy) Simone Pinna	23	(Italy) Ascoli	N/A	On loan until June 2021
MF	(Italy) Riccardo Ladinetti	19	(Italy) Olbia	N/A	On loan until June 2021
MF	(Croatia) Filip Bradarić	28	(Saudi Arabia) Al-Ain	N/A	On loan until June 2021
MF	(Italy) Federico Marigosu	19	(Italy) Olbia	N/A	On loan until June 2021
MF	(Uruguay) Christian Oliva	24	(Spain) Valencia	N/A	On loan until June 2021
FW	(Colombia) Damir Ceter	22	(Italy) Pescara	N/A	On loan until June 2021
FW	(Bulgaria) Kiril Despodov	23	(Bulgaria) Ludogorets Razgrad	N/A	On loan until June 2021
FW	(Brazil) Diego Farias	30	(Italy) Spezia	N/A	On loan until June 2021
FW	(Italy) Luca Gagliano	20	(Italy) Olbia	N/A	On loan until June 2021

== Pre-season and friendlies ==
Win Draw Loss Fixtures

4 September 2020 Friendly	Cagliari (Italy)	1–0	(Italy) Olbia	Aritzo, Italy
16:30 CEST (UTC+2)	Rog 77'	Report		Stadium: Stadio del Vento; Attendance: 250

12 September 2020 Friendly	Cagliari (Italy)	2–2	(Italy) Roma	Cagliari, Italy
18:00 CEST (UTC+2)	Rog 38'; Walukiewicz 43'		Ünder 59'; Mkhitaryan 61'	Stadium: Sardegna Arena; Attendance: 0

17 September 2020 Friendly	Cagliari (Italy)	4–1	(Italy) Olbia	Cagliari, Italy
	Pavoletti 13' 25'; Faragò 80'; João Pedro 86'		Udoh 5'	Stadium: Sardegna Arena

== Competitions ==
=== Overview ===
Competition	First match	Last match	Starting round	Final position	Record							
Competition	First match	Last match	Starting round	Final position	Pld	W	D	L	GF	GA	GD	Win %
Serie A	20 September 2020	22 May 2021	Matchday 1	16th	38	9	10	19	43	59	−16	23.68
Coppa Italia	28 October 2020	14 January 2021	Third round	Round of 16	3	2	0	1	4	4	+0	66.67
Total					41	11	10	20	47	63	−16	26.83

Last updated: 22 May 2021
Source: Soccerway

=== Serie A ===
==== League table ====
Pos	Team	Pld	W	D	L	GF	GA	GD	Pts	Qualification or relegation
14	Udinese	38	10	10	18	42	58	−16	40	
15	Spezia	38	9	12	17	52	72	−20	39	
16	Cagliari	38	9	10	19	43	59	−16	37	
17	Torino	38	7	16	15	50	69	−19	37	
18	Benevento (R)	38	7	12	19	40	75	−35	33	Relegation to Serie B

Source: Serie A, Soccerway
Rules for classification: 1) Points; 2) Head-to-head points; 3) Head-to-head goal difference; 4) Goal difference; 5) Goals scored; 6) Draw. (Note: Head-to-head record is used only after all the matches between the teams in question have been played)
(R) Relegated

==== Results summary ====
Overall								Home						Away					
Pld	W	D	L	GF	GA	GD	Pts	W	D	L	GF	GA	GD	W	D	L	GF	GA	GD
38	9	10	19	43	59	−16	37	5	4	10	22	32	−10	4	6	9	21	27	−6

Last updated: 22 May 2021.
Source: Serie A

==== Results by round ====
Round	1	2	3	4	5	6	7	8	9	10	11	12	13	14	15	16	17	18	19	20	21	22	23	24	25	26	27	28	29	30	31	32	33	34	35	36	37	38
Ground	A	H	A	A	H	A	H	A	H	A	H	A	H	A	H	H	A	H	A	H	A	H	H	A	H	A	H	A	H	A	H	A	H	A	A	H	A	H
Result	D	L	L	W	W	L	W	L	D	D	L	D	D	L	L	L	L	L	L	D	L	L	L	W	W	D	L	L	L	L	W	W	W	D	W	D	D	L
Position	7	14	17	13	11	12	11	11	12	11	11	12	13	15	15	15	16	17	18	18	18	18	18	18	17	17	17	18	18	18	18	18	17	17	16	15	16	16

Updated to match(es) played on 22 May 2021. Source: Serie A
A = Away; H = Home; W = Win; D = Draw; L = Loss

==== Matches ====
The league fixtures were announced on 2 September 2020.

20 September 2020 1	Sassuolo	1–1	Cagliari	Reggio Emilia
18:00 CEST (UTC+2)	Chiricheș (yellow card) 59'; Bourabia 87'	Report	Faragò (yellow card) 7'; Nández (yellow card) 16'; Rog (yellow card) 51'; Simeone 77'	Stadium: Mapei Stadium – Città del Tricolore; Referee: Livio Marinelli

26 September 2020 2	Cagliari	0–2	Lazio	Cagliari
18:00 CEST (UTC+2)	Marin (yellow card) 51'	Report	Lazzari 4'; Lucas (yellow card) 61'; Immobile 74'	Stadium: Sardegna Arena; Referee: Davide Massa

4 October 2020 3	Atalanta	5–2	Cagliari	Bergamo
12:30 CEST (UTC+2)	Muriel 7'; Gómez 29'; Pašalić 37'; Zapata 42'; Lammers 81'	Report	Godín 24'; João Pedro 52'	Stadium: Gewiss Stadium; Referee: Fabrizio Pasqua

18 October 2020 4	Torino	2–3	Cagliari	Turin
15:00 CEST (UTC+2)	Belotti 4' (pen.), 49'; Rincón (yellow card) 31'; Bonazzoli (yellow card) 65'; Milinković-Savić (red card) 87'	Report	João Pedro 12'; Simeone 19', 73'; Rog (yellow card) 31'; Lykogiannis (yellow card) 75'; Pavoletti (yellow card) 89'	Stadium: Stadio Olimpico Grande Torino; Referee: Federico La Penna

25 October 2020 5	Cagliari	4–2	Crotone	Cagliari
12:30 CET (UTC+1)	Lykogiannis 25', (yellow card) 67'; Marin (yellow card) 32'; Simeone 35'; Sottil 45'; João Pedro 84'	Report	Cigarini (yellow card) 17' (yellow-red card) 48'; Messias 21'; Molina 43'; Magallán (yellow card) 53'; Benali (yellow card) 90+2'	Stadium: Sardegna Arena; Referee: Antonio Di Martino

31 October 2020 6	Bologna	3–2	Cagliari	Bologna
20:45 CET (UTC+1)	Danilo (yellow card) 37'; Barrow 45', 56'; Soriano 52', (red card) 90+2'; De Silvestri (yellow card) 65'; Schouten (yellow card) 68'	Report	João Pedro 15', (yellow card) 36'; Lykogiannis (yellow card) 21'; Cragno (yellow card) 40'; Simeone 47'	Stadium: Stadio Renato Dall'Ara; Attendance: 0 Referee: Michael Fabbri

7 November 2020 7	Cagliari	2–0	Sampdoria	Cagliari
15:00 CET (UTC+1)	João Pedro 48' (pen.); Nández 69'	Report	Augello (red card) 40'; Tonelli (yellow card) 64'; Silva (yellow card) 83'	Stadium: Sardegna Arena; Attendance: 0 Referee: Giovanni Ayroldi

21 November 2020 8	Juventus	2–0	Cagliari	Turin
20:45 CET (UTC+1)	Rabiot (yellow card) 33'; Ronaldo 38', 42'; Danilo (yellow card) 53'; Arthur (yellow card) 54'	Report	Tripaldelli (yellow card) 35'; Sottil (yellow card) 74'	Stadium: Allianz Stadium; Attendance: 0 Referee: Fabio Maresca

29 November 2020 9	Cagliari	2–2	Spezia	Cagliari
18:00 CET (UTC+1)	João Pedro 52'; Pavoletti 58'	Report	Ferrer (yellow card) 30'; Terzi (yellow card) 33'; Gyasi 36'; Estévez (yellow card) 44'; Chabot (yellow card) 81'; Nzola 90+3' (pen.)	Stadium: Sardegna Arena; Attendance: 0 Referee: Valerio Marini

6 December 2020 10	Hellas Verona	1–1	Cagliari	Verona
12:30 CET (UTC+1)	Zaccagni 21'; Ceccherini (yellow card) 22'; Salcedo (yellow card) 81'	Report	Marin 48'	Stadium: Stadio Marcantonio Bentegodi; Attendance: 0 Referee: Gianluca Manganiello

13 December 2020 11	Cagliari	1–3	Internazionale	Cagliari
12:30 CET (UTC+1)	Faragò (yellow card) 10'; Sottil 42'; Pavoletti (yellow card) 71'	Report	Darmian (yellow card) 16'; Barella 77'; D'Ambrosio 84'; Lukaku 90+4'	Stadium: Sardegna Arena; Attendance: 0 Referee: Fabrizio Pasqua

16 December 2020 12	Parma	0–0	Cagliari	Parma
20:45 CET (UTC+1)	Cornelius (yellow card) 90+3'	Report	Oliva (yellow card) 25'	Stadium: Stadio Ennio Tardini; Attendance: 0 Referee: Ivano Pezzuto

20 December 2020 13	Cagliari	1–1	Udinese	Cagliari
15:00 CET (UTC+1)	Lykogiannis 27'; Pavoletti (yellow card) 45'; Nández (yellow card) 70'	Report	Lasagna 57'; Pereyra (yellow card) 75'	Stadium: Sardegna Arena; Attendance: 0 Referee: Marco Piccinini

23 December 2020 14	Roma	3–2	Cagliari	Rome
20:45 CET (UTC+1)	Veretout 11'; Cristante (yellow card) 19'; Mancini (yellow card) 37', (goal) 77'; Kumbulla (yellow card) 60'; Džeko 71'	Report	Zappa (yellow card) 20'; Nández (yellow card) 29'; João Pedro 59', 90+1' (pen.)	Stadium: Stadio Olimpico; Attendance: 0 Referee: Luca Pairetto

3 January 2021 15	Cagliari	1–4	Napoli	Cagliari
15:00 CET (UTC+1)	Lykogiannis (yellow card) 30' (yellow-red card) 65'; Sottil (yellow card) 53'; João Pedro 60'; Caligara (yellow card) 85'	Report	Zieliński 25', 62', (yellow card) 72'; Lozano 74'; Insigne 86' (pen.)	Stadium: Sardegna Arena; Attendance: 0 Referee: Gianluca Manganiello

6 January 2021 16	Cagliari	1–2	Benevento	Cagliari
12:30 CET (UTC+1)	Caligara (yellow card) 5'; João Pedro 20'; Nández (yellow card) 84', (red card) 85'; Sottil (yellow card) 89'; Pisacane (yellow card) 90+4'	Report	Schiattarella (yellow card) 6'; Sau 41'; Tuia 44'; Caprari (yellow card) 84'; Improta (yellow card) 87'	Stadium: Sardegna Arena; Attendance: 0 Referee: Eugenio Abbattista

10 January 2021 17	Fiorentina	1–0	Cagliari	Florence
18:00 CET (UTC+1)	Vlahović 72'; Biraghi (yellow card) 77'	Report	João Pedro (penalty missed) 37'; Oliva (yellow card) 53'; Tramoni (yellow card) 86'; Pavoletti (yellow card) 90+1'	Stadium: Stadio Artemio Franchi; Attendance: 0 Referee: Piero Giacomelli

18 January 2021 18	Cagliari	0–2	Milan	Cagliari
20:45 CET (UTC+1)	Godín (yellow card) 83'; Ceppitelli (yellow card) 88'	Report	Ibrahimović 7' (pen.), 52'; Romagnoli (yellow card) 39'; Saelemaekers (yellow card) 68' (yellow-red card) 74'	Stadium: Sardegna Arena; Attendance: 0 Referee: Rosario Abisso

24 January 2021 19	Genoa	1–0	Cagliari	Genoa
15:00 CET (UTC+1)	Destro 10', (yellow card) 18'	Report	Nández (yellow card) 20'; Zappa (yellow card) 85'	Stadium: Stadio Luigi Ferraris; Attendance: 0 Referee: Marco Di Bello

31 January 2021 20	Cagliari	1–1	Sassuolo	Cagliari
15:00 CET (UTC+1)	Marin (yellow card) 20'; Nainggolan (yellow card) 52'; João Pedro 75'	Report	Obiang (yellow card) 60'; Lopez (yellow card) 85'; Rogério (yellow card) 90'; Boga 90+4'	Stadium: Sardegna Arena; Attendance: 0 Referee: Maurizio Mariani

7 February 2021 21	Lazio	1–0	Cagliari	Rome
20:45 CET (UTC+1)	Immobile 61'; Correa (yellow card) 69'; Parolo (yellow card) 87'	Report	Nández (yellow card) 31'; João Pedro (yellow card) 82'	Stadium: Stadio Olimpico; Attendance: 0 Referee: Massimiliano Irrati

14 February 2021 22	Cagliari	0–1	Atalanta	Cagliari
15:00 CET (UTC+1)	Walukiewicz (yellow card) 7'; Rugani (yellow card) 60'; Lykogiannis (yellow card) 69'	Report	Romero (yellow card) 45+1'; Iličić (yellow card) 68'; De Roon (yellow card) 89'; Muriel 90'	Stadium: Sardegna Arena; Attendance: 0 Referee: Marco Piccinini

19 February 2021 23	Cagliari	0–1	Torino	Cagliari
20:45 CET (UTC+1)	Simeone (yellow card) 64'; Ceppitelli (yellow card) 72'; Zappa (yellow card) 88'	Report	Lukić (yellow card) 26'; Belotti (yellow card) 50'; Bremer 76'	Stadium: Sardegna Arena; Attendance: 0 Referee: Daniele Orsato

28 February 2021 24	Crotone	0–2	Cagliari	Crotone
15:00 CET (UTC+1)	Di Carmine (yellow card) 38'; Magallán (yellow card) 59'	Report	Ceppitelli (yellow card) 4'; Lykogiannis (yellow card) 10' (yellow-red card) 75'; Rugani (yellow card) 46'; Pavoletti 56'; João Pedro 60' (pen.)	Stadium: Stadio Ezio Scida; Attendance: 0 Referee: Michael Fabbri

3 March 2021 25	Cagliari	1–0	Bologna	Cagliari
20:45 CET (UTC+1)	Nández (yellow card) 15'; Rugani 19'; Cerri (yellow card) 89'	Report	Antov (yellow card) 26'; Schouten (yellow card) 86'	Stadium: Sardegna Arena; Attendance: 0 Referee: Marco Di Bello

7 March 2021 26	Sampdoria	2–2	Cagliari	Genoa
18:00 CET (UTC+1)	Colley (yellow card) 63'; Bereszyński 78'; Gabbiadini 80', (yellow card) 89'; Yoshida (yellow card) 89'; Thorsby (yellow card) 90+4'	Report	João Pedro 11'; Godín (yellow card) 26'; Pavoletti (yellow card) 53'; Lykogiannis (yellow card) 69'; Nainggolan 90+6'	Stadium: Stadio Luigi Ferraris; Attendance: 0 Referee: Piero Giacomelli

14 March 2021 27	Cagliari	1–3	Juventus	Cagliari
18:00 CET (UTC+1)	Simeone 61'	Report	Ronaldo 10', 25' (pen.), 32', (yellow card) 14'; Cuadrado (yellow card) 18'	Stadium: Sardegna Arena; Attendance: 0 Referee: Gianpaolo Calvarese

20 March 2021 28	Spezia	2–1	Cagliari	La Spezia
18:00 CET (UTC+1)	Piccoli 49'; Farias (yellow card) 72'; Maggiore 80'	Report	Nainggolan (yellow card) 43'; João Pedro (yellow card) 45+2'; Pereiro 83'	Stadium: Stadio Alberto Picco; Attendance: 0 Referee: Maurizio Mariani

3 April 2021 29	Cagliari	0–2	Hellas Verona	Cagliari
15:00 CEST (UTC+2)	Klavan (yellow card) 25'	Report	Lovato (yellow card) 6'; Barák 54'; Sturaro (yellow card) 88'; Lazović (yellow card) 90+4'; Lasagna 90+8'	Stadium: Sardegna Arena; Attendance: 0 Referee: Daniele Doveri

11 April 2021 30	Internazionale	1–0	Cagliari	Milan
12:30 CEST (UTC+2)	Brozović (yellow card) 52'; Darmian 77'	Report	Nainggolan (yellow card) 90+3'	Stadium: San Siro; Attendance: 0 Referee: Luca Pairetto

17 April 2021 31	Cagliari	4–3	Parma	Cagliari
20:45 CEST (UTC+2)	Marin (yellow card) 30', (goal) 66'; Pavoletti 39'; Duncan (yellow card) 48'; Nández (yellow card) 80'; Nainggolan (yellow card) 83'; Pereiro 90+1'; Cerri 90+4'	Report	Pezzella 5', (yellow card) 24'; Kucka 31'; Kurtić (yellow card) 58'; Man 59'	Stadium: Sardegna Arena; Attendance: 0 Referee: Paolo Valeri

21 April 2021 32	Udinese	0–1	Cagliari	Udine
20:45 CEST (UTC+2)		Report	Pavoletti (yellow card) 45'; João Pedro 55' (pen.); Nainggolan (yellow card) 59'	Stadium: Stadio Friuli; Attendance: 0 Referee: Marco Guida

25 April 2021 33	Cagliari	3–2	Roma	Cagliari
18:00 CEST (UTC+2)	Lykogiannis 4'; Marin (yellow card) 53', (goal) 57'; João Pedro 64', (yellow card) 80'; Duncan (yellow card) 90+3'	Report	Pérez 27'; Fazio 69'; Cristante (yellow card) 83'	Stadium: Sardegna Arena; Attendance: 0 Referee: Massimiliano Irrati

2 May 2021 34	Napoli	1–1	Cagliari	Naples
15:00 CEST (UTC+2)	Osimhen 13'; Demme (yellow card) 56'	Report	Godín (yellow card) 32'; Deiola (yellow card) 34'; Pavoletti (yellow card) 46'; Nández 90+4'	Stadium: Stadio San Paolo; Attendance: 0 Referee: Michael Fabbri

9 May 2021 35	Benevento	1–3	Cagliari	Benevento
15:00 CEST (UTC+2)	Schiattarella (yellow card) 10'; Lapadula 16'; Tello (yellow card) 56'	Report	Lykogiannis 1'; Pavoletti (yellow card) 13', (goal) 64'; Deiola (yellow card) 58'; João Pedro 90+3'	Stadium: Stadio Ciro Vigorito; Attendance: 0 Referee: Daniele Doveri

12 May 2021 36	Cagliari	0–0	Fiorentina	Cagliari
18:30 CEST (UTC+2)	Lykogiannis (yellow card) 35'	Report	Pulgar (yellow card) 27'; Cáceres (yellow card) 67'	Stadium: Sardegna Arena; Attendance: 0 Referee: Maurizio Mariani

16 May 2021 37	Milan	0–0	Cagliari	Milan
20:45 CEST (UTC+2)	Kjær (yellow card) 33'; Calabria (yellow card) 58'	Report	Marin (yellow card) 40'; Carboni (yellow card) 45+1'	Stadium: San Siro; Attendance: 0 Referee: Davide Massa

22 May 2021 38	Cagliari	0–1	Genoa	Cagliari
20:45 CEST (UTC+2)	Carboni (yellow card) 77'	Report	Shomurodov 15'; Behrami (yellow card) 51' (yellow-red card) 83'; Melegoni (yellow card) 64'; Strootman (yellow card) 90+4'	Stadium: Sardegna Arena; Attendance: 0 Referee: Francesco Meraviglia

=== Coppa Italia ===
28 October 2020 Third round	Cagliari	1–0	Cremonese	Cagliari
15:00 CET (UTC+1)	Faragò 69'; Caligara (yellow card) 74'; Ounas (yellow card) 85'	Report	Strizzolo (yellow card) 58'	Stadium: Sardegna Arena; Referee: Antonio Giua

25 November 2020 Fourth round	Cagliari	2–1	Hellas Verona	Cagliari
17:30 CET (UTC+1)	Cerri 30'; João Pedro (yellow card) 53'; Sottil 90+3'	Report	Danzi (yellow card) 15'; Amione (yellow card) 40'; Dawidowicz (yellow card) 41'; Colley 74'	Stadium: Sardegna Arena; Referee: Alessandro Prontera

14 January 2021 Round of 16	Atalanta	3–1	Cagliari	Bergamo
21:15 CET (UTC+1)	Miranchuk 43'; Muriel 61'; Šutalo 64'; Iličić (yellow card) 80'	Report	Sottil 55'	Stadium: Gewiss Stadium; Referee: Federico Dionisi

== Statistics ==
=== Appearances and goals ===
No.	Pos	Nat	Player	Total		Serie A		Coppa Italia	
No.	Pos	Nat	Player	Apps	Goals	Apps	Goals	Apps	Goals
Goalkeepers
1	GK	(Italy) ITA	Simone Aresti	0	0	0	0	0	0
28	GK	(Italy) ITA	Alessio Cragno	34	0	34	0	0	0
31	GK	(Italy) ITA	Guglielmo Vicario	7	0	4	0	3	0
Defenders
2	DF	(Uruguay) URU	Diego Godín	28	1	28	1	0	0
3	DF	(Italy) ITA	Alessandro Tripaldelli	13	0	3+7	0	2+1	0
15	DF	(Estonia) EST	Ragnar Klavan	16	0	9+6	0	1	0
16	DF	(Italy) ITA	Arturo Calabresi	2	0	0+2	0	0	0
19	DF	(Ghana) GHA	Kwadwo Asamoah	9	0	1+8	0	0	0
22	DF	(Greece) GRE	Charalampos Lykogiannis	33	4	29+2	4	0+2	0
23	DF	(Italy) ITA	Luca Ceppitelli	20	0	16+3	0	1	0
24	DF	(Italy) ITA	Daniele Rugani	16	1	12+4	1	0	0
25	DF	(Italy) ITA	Gabriele Zappa	36	0	27+7	0	2	0
40	DF	(Poland) POL	Sebastian Walukiewicz	21	0	18+1	0	2	0
44	DF	(Italy) ITA	Andrea Carboni	17	0	12+3	0	1+1	0
Midfielders
4	MF	(Belgium) BEL	Radja Nainggolan	22	1	22	1	0	0
6	MF	(Croatia) CRO	Marko Rog	16	0	14	0	1+1	0
8	MF	(Romania) ROU	Răzvan Marin	39	3	35+2	3	2	0
10	MF	(Brazil) BRA	João Pedro	40	16	37	16	1+2	0
14	MF	(Italy) ITA	Alessandro Deiola	12	0	7+5	0	0	0
17	MF	(France) FRA	Mattéo Tramoni	9	0	0+6	0	3	0
18	MF	(Uruguay) URU	Nahitan Nández	34	2	31+1	2	1+1	0
20	MF	(Uruguay) URU	Gastón Pereiro	16	2	2+13	2	0+1	0
32	MF	(Ghana) GHA	Alfred Duncan	20	0	12+7	0	1	0
Forwards
9	FW	(Argentina) ARG	Giovanni Simeone	33	6	19+14	6	0	0
26	FW	(Angola) ANG	Zito Luvumbo	0	0	0	0	0	0
27	FW	(Italy) ITA	Alberto Cerri	26	2	3+21	1	1+1	1
30	FW	(Italy) ITA	Leonardo Pavoletti	36	4	17+16	4	2+1	0
33	FW	(Italy) ITA	Riccardo Sottil	24	4	12+9	2	2+1	2
Players transferred out during the season
12	MF	(Italy) ITA	Fabrizio Caligara	12	0	2+8	0	2	0
14	DF	(Italy) ITA	Simone Pinna	0	0	0	0	0	0
19	DF	(Italy) ITA	Fabio Pisacane	7	0	2+3	0	2	0
21	MF	(Uruguay) URU	Christian Oliva	12	0	3+7	0	2	0
24	MF	(Italy) ITA	Paolo Faragò	9	0	4+4	0	1	0
32	FW	(Bulgaria) BUL	Kiril Despodov	1	0	0+1	0	0	0
37	FW	(Algeria) ALG	Adam Ounas	10	0	3+4	0	1+2	0
93	DF	(Croatia) CRO	Marko Pajač	0	0	0	0	0	0

Last updated: 22 May 2021
Source: Competitions

=== Goalscorers ===
As of 7 November 2020

Rank	No.	Pos	Nat	Name	Serie A	Coppa Italia	Total
1	9	FW	(Argentina)	Giovanni Simeone	5	0	5
1	10	MF	(Brazil)	Joāo Pedro	5	0	5
3	2	DF	(Uruguay)	Diego Godín	1	0	1
3	18	MF	(Uruguay)	Nahitan Nández	1	0	1
3	22	DF	(Greece)	Charalampos Lykogiannis	1	0	1
3	24	MF	(Italy)	Paolo Faragò	0	1	1
3	33	MF	(Italy)	Riccardo Sottil	1	0	1
Totals					14	1	15
