= 2022–23 Cagliari Calcio season =

Cagliari Calcio
2022–23 season
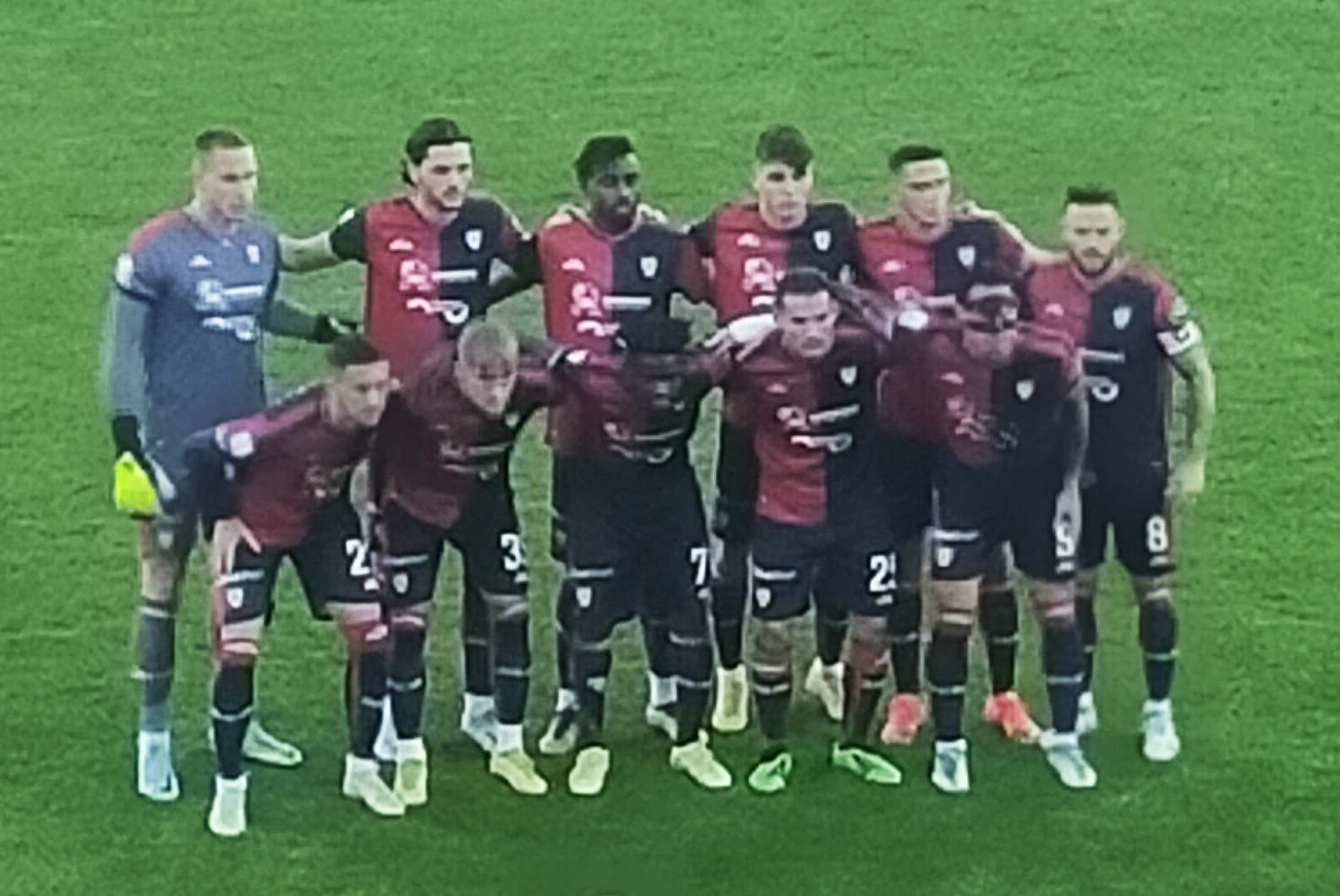
- Owner: Fluorsid Group
- President: Tommaso Giulini
- Head coach: Fabio Liverani (until 20 December); Claudio Ranieri (from 1 January)
- Stadium: Unipol Domus
- Serie B: 5th (promoted via play-offs)
- Coppa Italia: Round of 32
- Top goalscorer: League: Gianluca Lapadula (21); All: Gianluca Lapadula (26)
Home colours	Away colours	Third colours

The 2022–23 season was the 103rd season in the history of Cagliari Calcio and their first season back in the second division since 2016. The club participated in Serie B and the Coppa Italia.

== Players ==
As of 1 September 2022

Note: Flags indicate national team as defined under FIFA eligibility rules; some limited exceptions apply. Players may hold more than one non-FIFA nationality.

No.	Pos.	Nation	Player
1	GK	SRB	Boris Radunović
2	DF	ITA	Luigi Palomba
3	DF	ITA	Edoardo Goldaniga
4	DF	ITA	Alberto Dossena
5	MF	ITA	Marco Mancosu
6	MF	CRO	Marko Rog
8	MF	URU	Nahitan Nández
9	FW	PER	Gianluca Lapadula
10	MF	ITA	Nicolas Viola
12	GK	BIH	Eldin Lolić
14	MF	ITA	Alessandro Deiola
15	DF	ITA	Giorgio Altare
16	DF	ARG	Franco Carboni (on loan from Inter Milan)
18	GK	ITA	Simone Aresti
19	FW	ITA	Vincenzo Millico

No.	Pos.	Nation	Player
20	MF	URU	Gastón Pereiro
21	MF	ITA	Nicolò Cavuoti
22	GK	ITA	Giuseppe Ciocci
23	MF	ITA	Nunzio Lella
24	DF	ITA	Elio Capradossi
25	FW	ITA	Filippo Falco (on loan from Red Star Belgrade)
27	DF	ITA	Antonio Barreca
28	DF	ITA	Gabriele Zappa
29	MF	CGO	Antoine Makoumbou
30	FW	ITA	Leonardo Pavoletti
33	DF	SVK	Adam Obert
39	MF	GRE	Christos Kourfalidis
77	FW	ANG	Zito Luvumbo
80	MF	ARG	Isaías Delpupo
99	DF	ITA	Alessandro Di Pardo (on loan from Juventus)

=== Out on loan ===
As of 1 September 2022

Note: Flags indicate national team as defined under FIFA eligibility rules; some limited exceptions apply. Players may hold more than one non-FIFA nationality.

No.	Pos.	Nation	Player
—	GK	ITA	Alessio Cragno (at Monza until 30 June 2023)
—	DF	ITA	Raoul Bellanova (at Inter Milan until 30 June 2023)
—	DF	POL	Sebastian Walukiewicz (at Empoli until 30 June 2023)
—	MF	ROU	Răzvan Marin (at Empoli until 30 June 2023)

No.	Pos.	Nation	Player
—	FW	ITA	Alberto Cerri (at Como until 30 June 2023)
—	FW	ITA	Gianluca Contini (at Olbia until 30 June 2023)
—	DF	ITA	Salvatore Boccia (at Turris until 30 June 2023)
—	FW	ITA	Jacopo Desogus (at Pescara Calcio until 30 June 2023)

== Pre-season and friendlies ==
Win Draw Loss Fixtures

10 July 2022 Friendly	Cagliari	13–0	Rappresentativa Locale	Assemini
	Pereiro 22'; João Pedro 39'; Pavoletti 48', 63', 76'; Luvumbo 50', 56'; Del Pupo 58', 79'; Lella 59', 61'; Pandori 84' (o.g.); Palomba 88'	Report		Stadium: Asseminello; Referee: Caggiari

12 July 2022 Friendly	Cagliari	10–2	Rappresentativa Locale	Assemini
	Desogus 2', 8', 10', 22'; Pavoletti 25'; João Pedro 52', 59', 70', 84'; Tramoni 62'	Report	Mattana 30' (pen.); Stocchino 67'	Stadium: Asseminello

14 July 2022 Friendly	Cagliari A	2–2	Cagliari B	Assemini
17:30 CEST (UTC+2)	João Pedro 28', 82'	Report	Pavoletti 30'; Lella 57'	Stadium: Asseminello

17 July 2022 Friendly	Cagliari	6–1	Rappresentativa Locale	Assemini
	Deiola 10'; Contini 60', 85'; Faragò 64'; Desogus 87'; Luvumbo 89'	Report	Aloia 76'	Stadium: Asseminello; Referee: Selva

23 July 2022 VI Trofeo Sardegna	Olbia	0–3	Cagliari	Olbia
19:00 CEST (UTC+2)		Report	Desogus 6'; Pavoletti 38'; Lella 64'	Stadium: Stadio Bruno Nespoli; Referee: Giuseppe Collu

27 July 2022 Friendly	Strasbourg	1–2	Cagliari	Strasbourg, France
19:30 CEST (UTC+2)	Thomasson 19'	Report	Desogus 5'; Pavoletti 18'	Stadium: Stade de la Meinau; Attendance: 8,651; Referee: Aurélien Petit (France)

31 July 2022 Friendly	Leeds United	6–2	Cagliari	Leeds, England
18:00 BST (UTC+1)	Rodrigo 36', 48', 84'; Bamford 50', 71'; Koch 90'	Report	Lapadula 66'; Luvumbo 68'	Stadium: Elland Road; Attendance: 29,046; Referee: David Coote (England)

== Competitions ==
=== Overall record ===
Competition	First match	Last match	Starting round	Final position	Record							
Competition	First match	Last match	Starting round	Final position	Pld	W	D	L	GF	GA	GD	Win %
Serie B	13 August 2022	19 May 2023	Matchday 1	5th	38	15	15	8	50	34	+16	39.47
Promotion play-offs	27 May 2023	11 June 2023	Preliminary round	Winners	5	3	2	0	7	4	+3	60.00
Coppa Italia	5 August 2022	20 October 2022	Round of 64	Round of 32	2	1	0	1	3	3	+0	50.00
Total					45	19	17	9	60	41	+19	42.22

Source: Soccerway

=== Serie B ===
==== League table ====
Pos	Team	Pld	W	D	L	GF	GA	GD	Pts	Promotion, qualification or relegation
3	Bari	38	17	14	7	58	37	+21	65	Qualification for promotion play-offs semi-finals
4	Parma (Note: Parma were deducted one point for missing the deadline to fulfil obligations for February taxes on the salary bill.)	38	17	10	11	48	39	+9	60 (Note: Parma finished ahead of Cagliari on head-to-head points: Cagliari 1–1 Parma, Parma 2–1 Cagliari.)	Qualification for promotion play-offs semi-finals
5	Cagliari (O, P)	38	15	15	8	50	34	+16	60	Qualification for promotion play-offs preliminary round
6	Südtirol	38	14	16	8	38	34	+4	58	Qualification for promotion play-offs preliminary round
7	Reggina (Note: Reggina were deducted five points for failing to pay taxes and player salaries on time. The deduction was initially seven points; later relegated to Serie D after enduring serious financial difficulties for several years. Brescia was readmitted into Serie B.) (E)	38	17	4	17	49	45	+4	50	Revival in Serie D

Source: Soccerway (in English)
Rules for classification: 1) Points; 2) Head-to-head points; 3) Head-to-head goal difference; 4) Goal difference; 5) Goals scored; 6) Draw.
(E) Eliminated; (O) Play-off winners; (P) Promoted

==== Results summary ====
Overall								Home						Away					
Pld	W	D	L	GF	GA	GD	Pts	W	D	L	GF	GA	GD	W	D	L	GF	GA	GD
38	15	15	8	50	34	+16	60	11	6	2	28	17	+11	4	9	6	22	17	+5

Source: Serie B

==== Results by round ====
Round	1	2	3	4	5	6	7	8	9	10	11	12	13	14	15	16	17	18	19	20	21	22	23	24	25	26	27	28	29	30	31	32	33	34	35	36	37	38
Ground	A	H	A	H	A	H	A	H	H	A	H	A	H	A	H	A	H	A	H	H	A	H	A	H	A	A	H	A	H	A	H	A	H	A	H	A	H	A
Result	D	W	L	W	W	L	L	D	W	L	D	D	D	D	D	L	W	L	W	W	D	W	L	W	D	D	D	D	W	W	D	D	D	L	W	W	W	W
Position	11	5	12	7	3	6	9	9	8	10	10	10	10	11	12	12	11	14	11	8	8	6	9	6	6	8	7	8	7	6	5	6	6	6	6	6	6	5

Source: Serie B
A = Away; H = Home; W = Win; D = Draw; L = Loss

==== Matches ====
The league fixtures were announced on 15 July 2022.

13 August 2022 1	Como	1–1	Cagliari	Como
20:45 CEST (UTC+2)	Mancuso 19'		Pereiro 90+3'	Stadium: Stadio Giuseppe Sinigaglia; Referee: Gianluca Manganiello

21 August 2022 2	Cagliari	2–1	Cittadella	Cagliari
20:45 CEST (UTC+2)	Mancosu 72'; Makoumbou 87'		Asencio 29'	Stadium: Unipol Domus; Referee: Daniele Orsato

27 August 2022 3	SPAL	1–0	Cagliari	Ferrara
20:45 CEST (UTC+2)	La Mantia 37'			Stadium: Stadio Paolo Mazza; Referee: Lorenzo Maggioni

2 September 2022 4	Cagliari	1–0	Modena	Cagliari
20:30 CEST (UTC+2)	Rog 28'			Stadium: Unipol Domus; Attendance: 14,485; Referee: Niccolò Baroni

10 September 2022 5	Benevento	0–1	Cagliari	Benevento
14:00 CEST (UTC+2)				Stadium: Stadio Ciro Vigorito

17 September 2022 6	Cagliari	0–1	Bari	Cagliari
14:00 CEST (UTC+2)	Rog (yellow card) 29'; Carboni (yellow card) 58'; Millico (yellow card) 90+3'	Report	Ricci (yellow card) 35'; Cheddira 77'; Pucino (red card) 84'	Stadium: Unipol Domus; Attendance: 14,087; Referee: Francesco Fourneau

1 October 2022 7	Cagliari	1–4	Venezia	Cagliari
14:00 CEST (UTC+2)				Stadium: Unipol Domus; Referee: Francesco Cosso

7 October 2022 8	Genoa	0–0	Cagliari	Genoa
20:30 CET	Frendrup (yellow card) 30'; Strootman (yellow card) 67'; Portanova (yellow card) 90+4'	Report	Deiola (yellow card) 31'; Nández (yellow card) 65'; Falco (yellow card) 85'	Stadium: Stadio Luigi Ferraris; Attendance: 26,042; Referee: Matteo Marchetti

15 October 2022 9	Cagliari	2–1	Brescia	Cagliari
14:00 CEST (UTC+2)				Stadium: Unipol Domus; Referee: Daniele Chiffi

24 October 2022 10	Ascoli	2–1	Cagliari	Ascoli Piceno
20:30 CEST (UTC+2)				Stadium: Stadio Cino e Lillo Del Duca

3 February 2023 23	Modena	2–0	Cagliari	Modena

11 February 2023 24	Cagliari	1–0	Benevento	Cagliari

18 February 2023 25	Bari	1–1	Cagliari	Bari

25 February 2023 26	Venezia	0–0	Cagliari	Venice

1 March 2023 27	Cagliari	0–0	Genoa	Cagliari

5 March 2023 28	Brescia	1–1	Cagliari	Brescia

10 March 2023 29	Cagliari	4–1	Ascoli	Cagliari

18 March 2023 30	Reggina	0–4	Cagliari	Reggio Calabria

1 April 2023 31	Cagliari	1–1	Südtirol	Cagliari

10 April 2023 32	Pisa	0–0	Cagliari	Pisa

15 April 2023 33	Cagliari	0–0	Frosinone	Cagliari

22 April 2023 34	Parma	2–1	Cagliari	Parma

30 April 2023 35	Cagliari	2–1	Ternana	Cagliari

5 May 2023 36	Perugia	0–5	Cagliari	Perugia

13 May 2023 37	Cagliari	2–1	Palermo	Cagliari

19 May 2023 38	Cosenza	0–1	Cagliari	Cosenza

=== Coppa Italia ===
5 August 2022 Round of 64	Cagliari	3–2	Perugia	Cagliari
17:45 CEST (UTC+2)	Altare 2'; Lapadula 80' (pen.); Viola 89'	Report	Iannoni (yellow card) 23'; Melchiorri 32'; Righetti (yellow card) 63'; Di Serio 67'; Angori (yellow card) 90+4'	Stadium: Unipol Domus; Referee: Matteo Gualtieri

20 October 2022 Round of 32	Bologna	1–0	Cagliari	Bologna
21:00 CEST (UTC+2)	Bonifazi (yellow card) 18'; Obert 69' (o.g.)	Report	Millico (yellow card) 48'	Stadium: Stadio Renato Dall'Ara; Attendance: 6,400; Referee: Giacomo Camplone
