= Andrea Carboni =

Italian footballer (born 2001)

Personal information
- Date of birth: 4 February 2001 (age 25)
- Place of birth: Sorgono, Italy
- Height: 1.85 m (6 ft 1 in)
- Position: Centre-back

Team information
- Current team: Monza
- Number: 44

Youth career
- 2006–2011: Tonara
- 2011–2020: Cagliari

Senior career*
| Years | Team | Apps | (Gls) |
| 2020–2022 | Cagliari | 52 | (0) |
| 2022– | Monza | 81 | (2) |
| 2023 | → Venezia (loan) | 17 | (3) |

International career^{‡}
| 2019 | Italy U19 | 1 | (0) |
| 2021–2022 | Italy U20 | 3 | (0) |
| 2021–2023 | Italy U21 | 2 | (0) |
- * Club domestic league appearances and goals as of 12 May 2026 ‡ National team caps and goals as of 24 March 2023

Andrea Carboni (born 4 February 2001) is an Italian professional footballer who plays as a defender for Serie A club Monza.

== Club career ==
=== Cagliari ===
Born in Sorgono, in the Province of Nuoro, Carboni grew up in Nuoro where he began playing football at youth level. Aged 10, he was noticed by Gianfranco Matteoli, the head of the Cagliari's youth sector, and was signed by the club.

On 2 January 2020, Carboni signed his first professional contract, on a two-year contract. Following his performances in the Campionato Primavera 1 (under-19), Carboni was made part of the first-team squad at the end of May 2020 by coach Walter Zenga. On 22 June, he made his Serie A debut, as a last-minute substitute against SPAL. He played his first game as a starter five days later, in a 4–2 home win against Torino. In July, Carboni received two red cards against Atalanta and Sassuolo. He made seven league appearances in the 2019–20 season.

In the 2020–21 season, Carboni was made a permanent member of the first team. In the first leg of the season, under coach Eusebio Di Francesco, he played six league games and two Coppa Italia games. Having failed a loan move in the January transfer window, Carboni temporarily played for the Primavera side. Following the arrival of Leonardo Semplici as Cagliari head coach, Carboni progressively recovered his place in the team, finishing the season with 15 league appearances. In April 2021, he renewed his contract with Cagliari until 2025.

=== Monza ===
On 30 June 2022, newly-promoted Serie A side Monza announced the signing of Carboni on a five-year contract. He made his debut for Monza on 14 August, as a substitute in a 2–1 Serie A defeat to Torino.

==== Loan to Venezia ====
On 31 January 2023, Carboni joined Venezia in Serie B on loan until the end of the season.

== International career ==
Carboni played for Italy U19 in October 2019. On 3 September 2021 he made his debut with Italy U21, playing as a starter in the qualifying match won 3–0 against Luxembourg.

== Style of play ==
Carboni is a left-footed centre-back. He is known for his passing, physical strength and heading.

== Personal life ==
Carboni is a black belt in jujutsu.

== Career statistics ==
=== Club ===
As of match played 24 May 2025

| Club | Season | League | | | Coppa Italia | | Total | |
| Club | Season | Division | Apps | Goals | Apps | Goals | Apps | Goals |
|---|---|---|---|---|---|---|---|---|
| Cagliari | 2019–20 | Serie A | 7 | 0 | 0 | 0 | 7 | 0 |
| Cagliari | 2020–21 | Serie A | 15 | 0 | 2 | 0 | 17 | 0 |
| Cagliari | 2021–22 | Serie A | 30 | 0 | 3 | 0 | 33 | 0 |
| Cagliari | Total | | 52 | 0 | 5 | 0 | 57 | 0 |
| Monza | 2022–23 | Serie A | 4 | 0 | 1 | 0 | 5 | 0 |
| Monza | 2023–24 | Serie A | 21 | 1 | 1 | 0 | 22 | 1 |
| Monza | 2024–25 | Serie A | 26 | 0 | 2 | 0 | 28 | 0 |
| Monza | Total | | 51 | 1 | 4 | 0 | 55 | 1 |
| Venezia (loan) | 2022–23 | Serie B | 16 | 3 | — | | 16 | 3 |
| Career total | | | 119 | 4 | 9 | 0 | 128 | 4 |
