= Simone Aresti =

Italian footballer (born 1986)

Personal information
- Date of birth: 15 March 1986 (age 40)
- Place of birth: Carbonia, Italy
- Height: 1.88 m (6 ft 2 in)
- Position: Goalkeeper

Senior career*
Years	Team	Apps	(Gls)
2006–2011	Cagliari	1	(0)
2007–2008	→ Pistoiese (loan)	12	(0)
2009–2010	→ Alghero (co-ownership)	27	(0)
2011–2014	Savona	94	(2)
2014–2016	Pescara	27	(0)
2016–2017	Ternana	26	(0)
2017–2018	Olbia	36	(0)
2018–2020	Cagliari	0	(0)
2020	Olbia	9	(0)
2020–2024	Cagliari	1	(0)
Total		233	(2)
- * Club domestic league appearances and goals

Simone Aresti (born 15 March 1986) is an Italian professional footballer who plays as a goalkeeper.

== Club career ==
During the 2011–12 Lega Pro Seconda Divisione season, the goalkeeper Aresti, while wearing the shirt of Italian club Savona, scored 2 goals.

On 10 July 2018, Aresti returned at Serie A side Cagliari.

On 4 January 2020, he returned to Olbia, signing a contract until the end of the 2019–20 season.

== Personal life ==
On 19 December 2020 he tested positive for COVID-19.

== Career statistics ==
=== Club ===
Appearances and goals by club, season and competition
Club	Season	League			National Cup		Other		Total	
Club	Season	Division	Apps	Goals	Apps	Goals	Apps	Goals	Apps	Goals
Cagliari	2006–07	Serie A	1	0	0	0	—		1	0
Cagliari	2008–09	Serie A	0	0	0	0	—		0	0
Cagliari	Total		1	0	0	0	—		1	0
Pistoiese (loan)	2007–08	Serie C1	12	0	—		1	0	13	0
Alghero (co-ownership)	2009–10	Lega Pro 2D	27	0	—		—		27	0
Savona	2011–12	Lega Pro 2D	34	2	—		2	0	36	2
Savona	2012–13	Lega Pro 2D	32	0	—		1	0	33	0
Savona	2013–14	Lega Pro 2D	28	0	2	0	3	0	33	0
Savona	Total		94	2	2	0	6	0	102	2
Pescara	2014–15	Serie B	17	0	1	0	—		18	0
Pescara	2015–16	Serie B	10	0	0	0	0	0	10	0
Pescara	Total		27	0	1	0	0	0	28	0
Ternana	2016–17	Serie B	26	0	—		—		26	0
Olbia	2017–18	Serie C	36	0	—		0	0	36	0
Cagliari	2018–19	Serie A	0	0	0	0	—		0	0
Cagliari	2019–20	Serie A	0	0	1	0	—		1	0
Cagliari	Total		0	0	1	0	—		1	0
Olbia	2019–20	Serie C	9	0	0	0	—		9	0
Cagliari	2020–21	Serie A	0	0	0	0	—		0	0
Cagliari	2021–22	Serie A	0	0	0	0	—		0	0
Cagliari	2022–23	Serie B	0	0	1	0	0	0	1	0
Cagliari	2023–24	Serie A	1	0	0	0	—		1	0
Cagliari	Total		1	0	1	0	0	0	2	0
Career total			233	2	5	0	7	0	245	2
