= Damir Ceter =

Colombian footballer (born 1997)

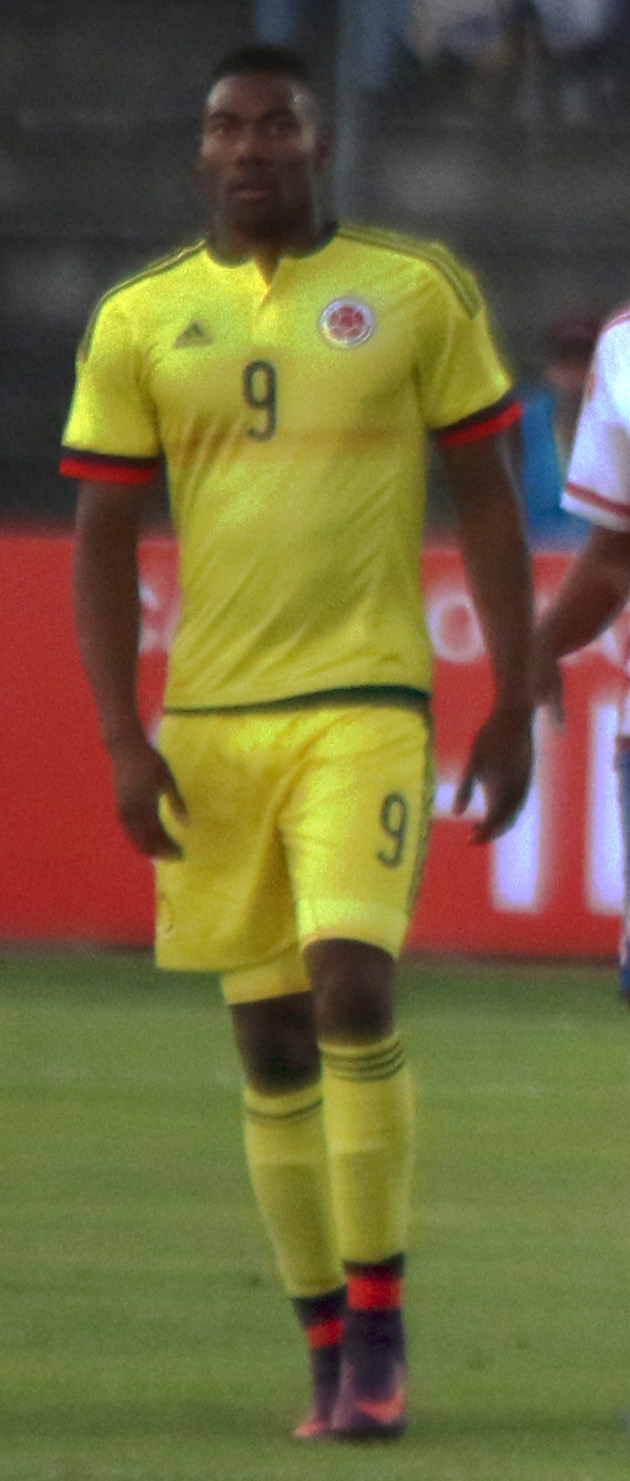
- Ceter with Colombia U20 in 2017

Personal information
- Full name: Damir Ceter Valencia
- Date of birth: 2 November 1997 (age 29)
- Place of birth: Buenaventura, Colombia
- Height: 1.88 m (6 ft 2 in)
- Position: Forward

Team information
- Current team: Ħamrun Spartans
- Number: 24

Youth career
- Universitario Popayán

Senior career*
Years	Team	Apps	(Gls)
2014–2015	Universitario Popayán	22	(4)
2016	Deportes Quindío	25	(14)
2017	→ Santa Fe (loan)	10	(1)
2018–2022	Cagliari	7	(0)
2018–2019	→ Olbia (loan)	33	(11)
2019–2020	→ Chievo (loan)	26	(2)
2020–2021	→ Pescara (loan)	28	(5)
2022–2023	Bari	12	(0)
2023–2024	Virtus Verona	20	(3)
2024–2025	Jaguares de Córdoba	41	(9)
2026–	Ħamrun Spartans	10	(6)

International career^{‡}
2017	Colombia U20	2	(2)
- * Club domestic league appearances and goals as of 7 May 2026 ‡ National team caps and goals as of 9 February 2018

Damir Ceter Valencia (born 2 November 1997) is a Colombian football player who plays as forward for Maltese Premier League club Ħamrun Spartans.

== Career ==
On 12 January 2018, Ceter signed with Italian club Cagliari. He made his Serie A debut in the match against Benevento.

On 28 July 2018, Ceter joined to Olbia on loan until 30 June 2019.

On 8 July 2019, Ceter signed to Serie B side ChievoVerona on loan until 30 June 2020.

On 8 September 2020, Ceter was loaned to Serie B side Pescara, as part of a player exchange that saw Gabriele Zappa move to Cagliari.

On 26 July 2022, Ceter signed a one-year contract with Bari.

On 18 October 2023, Ceter joined Virtus Verona until the end of the 2023–24 season.

On 24 July 2024, Ceter returned to Colombia and signed with Jaguares de Córdoba.

== Career statistics ==
=== Club ===
As of match played 23 August 2023

Appearances and goals by club, season and competition
Club	Season	League			National Cup (Note: Includes Copa Colombia, Coppa Italia, Coppa Italia Serie C)		Europe		Other		Total	
Club	Season	Division	Apps	Goals	Apps	Goals	Apps	Goals	Apps	Goals	Apps	Goals
Deportes Quindío	2016	Categoría Primera B	4	3	3	0	—		—		7	3
Santa Fe (loan)	2017	Categoría Primera A	10	1	1	0	5 (Note: Four appearances and one goal in Copa Libertadores, one appearance in Copa Sudamericana)	1	—		16	2
Cagliari	2017–18	Serie A	6	0	0	0	—		—		6	0
Cagliari	2021–22	Serie A	1	0	1	1	—		—		2	1
Cagliari	Total		7	0	1	1	—		—		8	1
Olbia (loan)	2018–19	Serie C	33	11	2	2	—		—		35	13
Chievo (loan)	2019–20	Serie B	23	2	0	0	—		3 (Note: Appearance(s) in Serie B play-off)	0	26	2
Pescara (loan)	2020–21	Serie B	28	5	1	0	—		—		29	5
Bari	2022–23	Serie B	12	0	1	0	—		2	0	15	0
Career total			117	22	9	3	5	1	5	0	136	26
