= Christian Oliva =

Uruguayan footballer (born 1996)

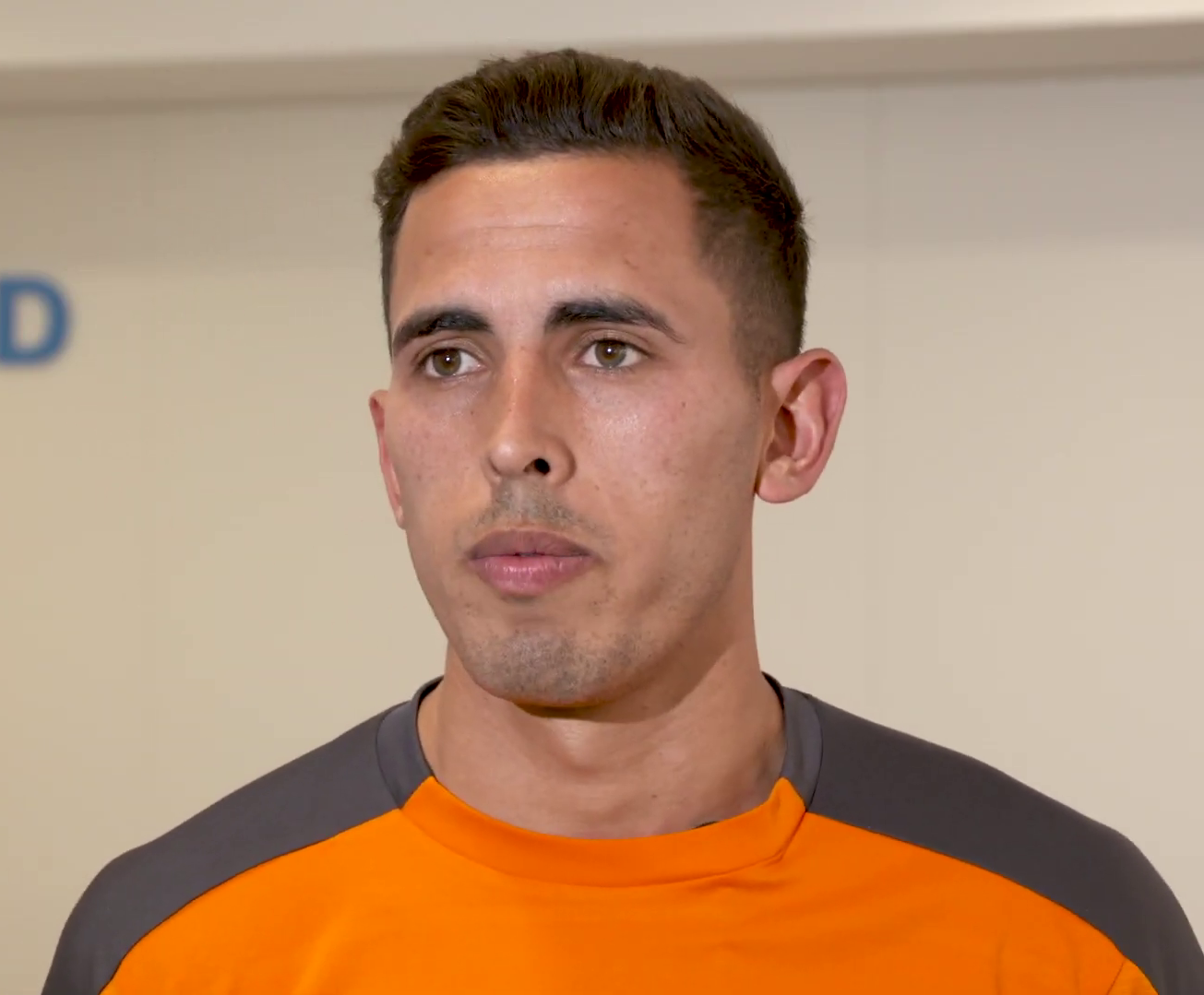
- Oliva in 2021

Personal information
- Full name: Christian Gabriel Oliva Giménez
- Date of birth: 1 June 1996 (age 30)
- Place of birth: Ciudad del Plata, Uruguay
- Height: 1.78 m (5 ft 10 in)
- Position: Defensive midfielder

Team information
- Current team: Santos
- Number: 28

Youth career
- Club de Bochas
- Bella Vista
- 2016–2018: Nacional

Senior career*
Years	Team	Apps	(Gls)
2018–2019	Nacional	25	(2)
2019	→ Cagliari (loan)	0	(0)
2019–2022	Cagliari	25	(1)
2021	→ Valencia (loan)	9	(0)
2022–2023	Talleres	41	(0)
2023	→ Juárez (loan)	10	(0)
2024–2026	Nacional	66	(3)
2026–	Santos	27	(2)
- * Club domestic league appearances and goals as of 17:30, 19 November 2026 (UTC)

Christian Gabriel Oliva Giménez (born 1 June 1996) is a Uruguayan professional footballer who plays as a defensive midfielder for Campeonato Brasileiro Série A club Santos.

== Career ==
=== Early career ===
Oliva was born in Delta El Tigre, Ciudad del Plata, San José Department. After starting at hometown side Club de Bochas de Delta El Tigre, he joined Nacional's youth setup. Subsequently released, he joined Bella Vista before returning to Nacional in 2016.

=== Nacional ===
In January 2018, after scoring 17 goals for the reserve side, Oliva was promoted to Nacional's first team by manager Alexander Medina, who also worked with him in the B-team. He made his professional debut late in the month, coming on as a second-half substitute for Luis Aguiar in a 3–1 loss against Peñarol, for the year's Supercopa Uruguaya.

Oliva made his Primera División debut on 10 February 2018, playing 14 minutes in a 3–0 away win against Rampla Juniors. His first goal in the category came on 15 April, as he scored the game's only in a home defeat of Boston River. A regular starter, he extended his contract until 2020 on 25 April.

=== Cagliari ===
On 25 January 2019, Oliva signed for Italian Serie A club Cagliari; the deal was a loan with an obligation to sign permanently until 2023 and an option for a further year. Unused in his first season on Sardinia, he made his debut as a 55th-minute substitute for the injured Luca Cigarini in a 3–1 home win over Genoa on 20 September, and scored his first goal on 3 November to secure a 2–0 victory at Atalanta.

==== Loan to Valencia ====
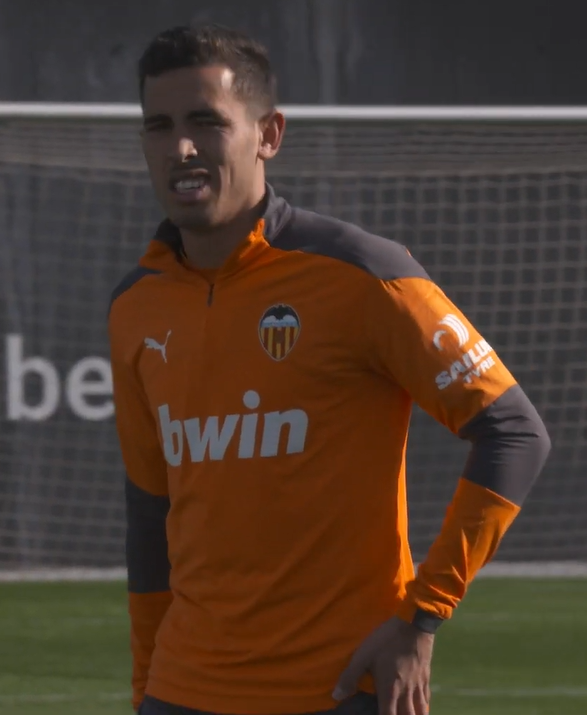
Oliva training with Valencia in 2021

On 1 February 2021, Oliva joined Spanish side Valencia CF on loan for the remainder of the 2020–21 season. He made his club debut thirteen days later, replacing Carlos Soler in a 2–0 away win to Real Madrid.

Mainly a substitute during his spell, Oliva only started in one match, a 1–0 loss to rivals Levante. Despite expressing his desire to stay at the club, he left in July after nine appearances.

==== Return from loan ====
Back to Cagliari in July 2021, Oliva was mainly an unused substitute, only starting in a Coppa Italia match against Cittadella in December. On 28 January 2022, his contract with Cagliari was terminated by mutual consent.

=== Talleres ===
On 12 February 2022, Oliva signed a contract with Talleres de Córdoba in Argentina until 2024. Regularly used in his first year, he lost space in his second.

==== Loan to Juárez ====
On 15 August 2023, Oliva moved to Liga MX side FC Juárez on loan for the season.

=== Return to Nacional ===
On 11 January 2024, Oliva was announced back at his first club Nacional. Roughly one year later, after being an undisputed starter, he renewed his contract until December 2026.

=== Santos ===
On 28 February 2026, Campeonato Brasileiro Série A side Santos announced the signing of Oliva on a three-year contract. He made his club debut on 11 March, replacing Willian Arão in a 2–2 away draw against Mirassol.

Oliva scored his first goal for Peixe on 30 August 2026, netting the winner in a 1–0 away success over Corinthians.

== Career statistics ==
As of 19 November 2026

Club	Season	League			National cup (Note: Includes Coppa Italia, Copa Argentina, Copa Uruguay)		Continental		Other		Total	
Club	Season	Division	Apps	Goals	Apps	Goals	Apps	Goals	Apps	Goals	Apps	Goals
Nacional	2018	Uruguayan Primera División	27	2	—		15 (Note: Ten appearances and one goal in Copa Libertadores, five appearances in Copa Sudamericana)	1	1 (Note: Appearance(s) in Supercopa Uruguaya)	0	43	3
Cagliari	2019–20	Serie A	11	1	2	1	—		—		13	2
Cagliari	2020–21	Serie A	10	0	2	0	—		—		12	0
Cagliari	2021–22	Serie A	4	0	1	0	—		—		5	0
Cagliari	Total		25	1	5	1	0	0	—		30	2
Valencia (loan)	2020–21	La Liga	9	0	0	0	—		—		9	0
Talleres	2022	Argentine Primera División	25 (Note: Soccerway counts Copa de la Liga Profesional appearances as league appearances.)	0	5	0	6 (Note: Appearance(s) in Copa Libertadores)	0	—		36	0
Talleres	2023	Argentine Primera División	16	0	2	0	0	0	—		18	0
Talleres	Total		41	0	7	0	6	0	—		54	0
Juárez (loan)	2023–24	Liga MX	10	0	0	0	—		—		10	0
Nacional	2024	Liga AUF Uruguaya	30	1	3	0	7	0	—		40	1
Nacional	2025	Liga AUF Uruguaya	34	2	1	0	6	1	1	0	42	3
Nacional	2026	Liga AUF Uruguaya	2	0	0	0	0	0	1	0	3	0
Nacional	Total		66	3	4	0	13	1	2	0	85	4
Santos	2026	Série A	27	2	6	0	10 (Note: Appearance(s) in Copa Sudamericana)	1	—		43	3
Career total			205	8	22	1	44	3	3	0	274	12
