= João Pedro (footballer, born 1992) =

Brazilian-Italian footballer

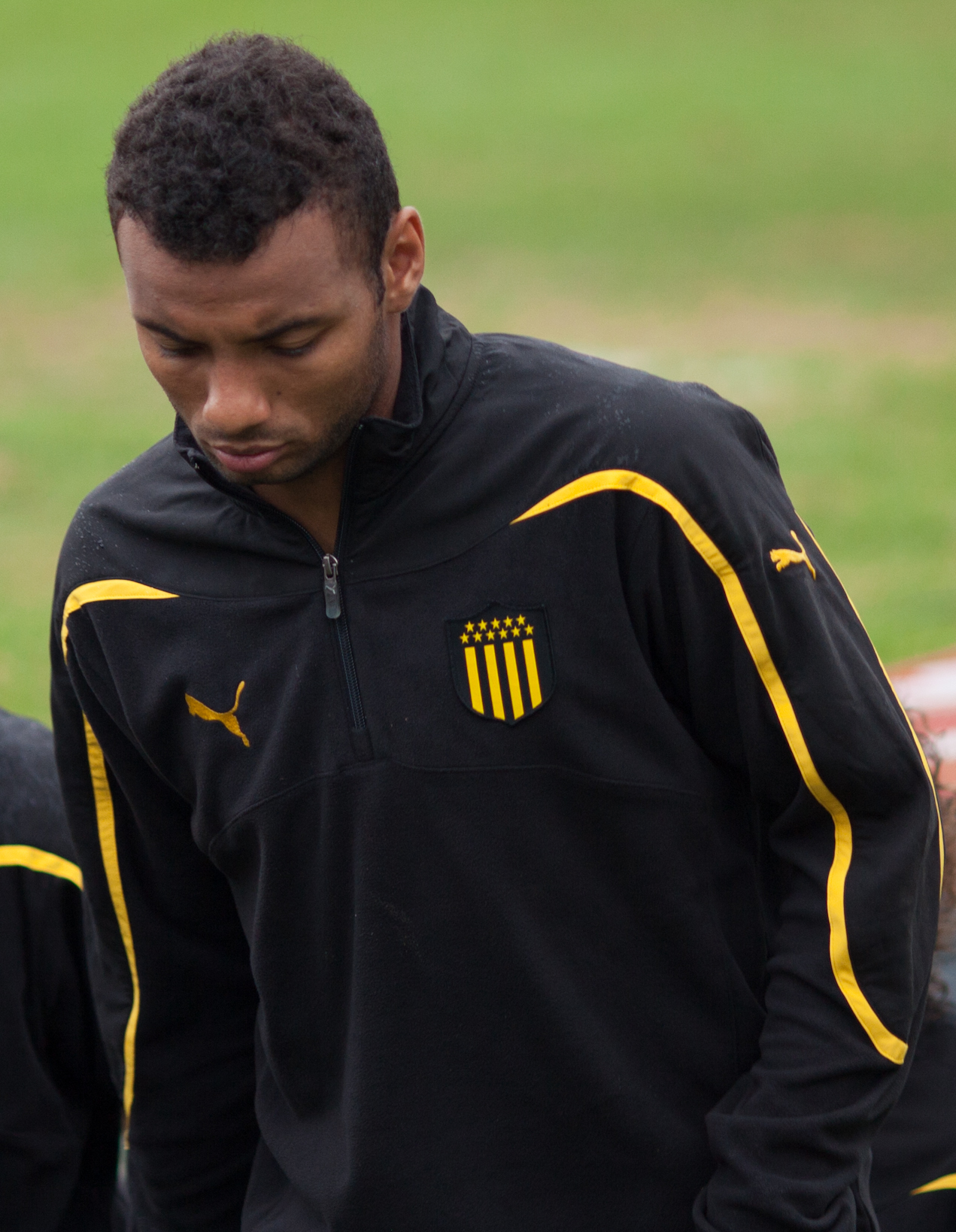
- João Pedro with Peñarol in 2012

Personal information
- Full name: João Pedro Geraldino dos Santos Galvão
- Date of birth: 9 March 1992 (age 34)
- Place of birth: Ipatinga, Brazil
- Height: 1.84 m (6 ft 0 in)
- Positions: Forward; attacking midfielder

Team information
- Current team: Atlético San Luis
- Number: 9

Youth career
- 2006–2010: Atlético Mineiro

Senior career*
Years	Team	Apps	(Gls)
2010	Atlético Mineiro	11	(0)
2010–2012	Palermo	1	(0)
2011	→ Vitória Guimarães (loan)	6	(0)
2011–2012	→ Peñarol (loan)	15	(6)
2012–2013	Santos	10	(0)
2013–2014	Estoril	27	(9)
2014–2022	Cagliari	255	(84)
2022–2024	Fenerbahçe	20	(4)
2023–2024	→ Grêmio (loan)	25	(0)
2024–2025	Hull City	35	(6)
2025–	Atlético San Luis	34	(26)

International career^{‡}
2009	Brazil U17	11	(1)
2022	Italy	1	(0)
- * Club domestic league appearances and goals as of 11:08, 3 July 2026 (UTC) ‡ National team caps and goals as of 24 March 2022

João Pedro Geraldino dos Santos Galvão (Brazil, 9 March 1992), commonly known as João Pedro, is a professional footballer who plays as a forward or an attacking midfielder for Liga MX club Atlético San Luis.

João Pedro spent most of his career with Serie A club Cagliari from 2014 to 2022, where he was the captain, making 271 appearances and scoring 86 goals for the club. He won Serie B in 2016 and played for seven seasons in Serie A. Additionally, he had brief spells in the top divisions of Brazil, Portugal, Uruguay and Turkey.

Born in Brazil, he acquired Italian nationality and made his senior international debut in 2022.

== Club career ==
=== Atlético Mineiro ===
Born in Ipatinga, Minas Gerais, João Pedro joined the youth ranks of Atlético Mineiro in April 2006, and made his competitive first team debut on 23 May 2010 in a game against Atlético Paranaense. His successive good performances then led head coach Vanderlei Luxemburgo to regularly select him for the Brazilian league games held between May and August 2010, also switching him from his original position of second striker to an attacking midfielder role.

=== Palermo ===
On 30 August 2010, Serie A club Palermo announced the signing of João Pedro on a five-year contract. He made his debut in a 2010–11 UEFA Europa League game against Sparta Prague. His Serie A debut came on 17 January 2011, as a second-half substitute for Josip Iličić in a 1–3 loss to Cagliari.

On 29 January 2011, Vitória Guimarães announced the signing of João Pedro on loan for the remainder of the season. He was sent back on 4 April for disciplinary reasons, after reacting angrily to being substituted in the first half against Sporting CP.

On 19 August 2011, Palermo loaned João Pedro to Uruguayan club Peñarol. He scored six times in his spell in Montevideo, including two on 24 September in a 4–0 win at neighbours River Plate that put his team on top of the table.

=== Santos ===
João Pedro returned to his homeland on 5 July 2012, signing with Santos until 2014. The club purchased 20% of his economic rights from Traffic Sports Marketing, and had priority to buy 30% more.

=== Estoril ===
On 1 July 2013, after not featuring with the first team in 2013 season, João Pedro rescinded with Santos and signed a one-year deal with Estoril. He scored eight times in his only full season for the Lisbon District club as they came fourth, including two on 1 March 2014 in a 4–0 home win over Olhanense.

=== Cagliari ===
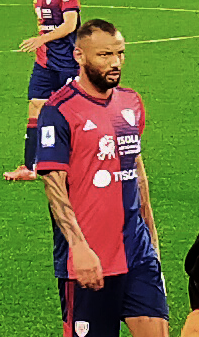
João Pedro in 2022 with Cagliari

João Pedro returned to Serie A on 30 August 2014, signing for Cagliari for around €1 million and exchange with Matías Cabrera. The team suffered relegation in his first season, but he scored 13 times in 38 games as they won the 2015–16 Serie B, including a hat-trick in a 6–0 home win over Brescia on 16 April.

In August 2017, João Pedro signed a new contract to last until 2021. The following 16 May, he was given a six-month ban after testing positive for banned diuretic hydrochlorothiazide following a match against Sassuolo in February.

João Pedro signed a new contract in November 2018, to last until 2022; a year later, this was extended until 2023. On 21 December 2019 he scored in a 2–1 loss at Udinese to reach 50 for the Sardinians, seventh in their all-time scorers. He finished joint-fifth in the league's top scorers with 18, his best campaign.

As Radja Nainggolan returned to Inter, João Pedro became the club captain for 2020–21. In November, he reached 200 appearances for the club. His 16 goals helped the team avoid relegation, and put him 10th in the season's scorers.

In 2021–22, João Pedro was the league's joint seventh top scorer with 13 goals, while Cagliari were relegated. This included both goals of a 2–2 comeback draw at home to Spezia in the opening game on 23 August, and a further brace on 17 October to defeat Sampdoria 3–1 at the Unipol Domus.

=== Fenerbahçe ===
On 21 July 2022, João Pedro joined Turkish Süper Lig club Fenerbahçe on a three-year deal. The fee was reported by Italy's Sky Sport to be €6.5 million.

==== Loan to Grêmio ====
On 1 August 2023, Grêmio announced an agreement for the signing of João Pedro, pending on medical examinations.

=== Hull City ===
On 26 September 2024, João Pedro joined EFL Championship club Hull City on an initial one-year contract with the option for a further twelve months. He made his debut on 5 October 2024 when he came off the bench as a 72nd-minute substitute for Chris Bedia in the 0–4 loss away to Norwich City. On 19 June 2025 Pedro left Hull City by mutual consent.

== International career ==
João Pedro was a youth international for Brazil, and was part of the under-17 squad that appeared in the 2009 South American U-17 Football Championship and the 2009 FIFA U-17 World Cup. He with this team played eleven games and scored one goal.

In early 2021, it was speculated João Pedro, an Italian citizen by marriage, might be called up by the Italy national team. In November that year, he openly stated his potential interest in the opportunity. On 5 January 2022, FIFA allowed him to play for Italy. Later that month, he was formally called up by Roberto Mancini for a three-day training camp in Coverciano.

On 18 March 2022, João Pedro was selected by Mancini for a 2022 FIFA World Cup playoff against North Macedonia. He made his debut in the match six days later, as a last-minute substitute for Domenico Berardi as Italy were eliminated by a late goal in Palermo.

== Personal life ==
João Pedro has two children with his Italian wife, originally from Palermo, whom he met during his footballing stay in Sicily. In 2017, he acquired Italian citizenship through marriage.

== Career statistics ==
=== Club ===
As of 22 August 2025

Club	Season	League			National cup (Note: Includes Taça de Portugal, Coppa Italia, Turkish Cup and FA Cup)		Continental		Other		Total	
Club	Season	Division	Apps	Goals	Apps	Goals	Apps	Goals	Apps	Goals	Apps	Goals
Atlético Mineiro	2010	Série A	11	0	—		2 (Note: Appearances in Copa Sudamericana)	0	—		13	0
Palermo	2010–11	Serie A	1	0	—		3 (Note: Appearances in UEFA Europa League)	0	5 (Note: Appearances in Campionato Primavera C)	5	9	5
Vitória Guimarães (loan)	2010–11	Primeira Liga	6	0	1	0	—		—		7	0
Peñarol (loan)	2011–12	Uruguayan Primera División	15	6	—		8 (Note: Appearances in Copa Libertadores)	1	—		23	7
Santos	2012	Série A	10	0	—		—		—		10	0
Estoril	2013–14	Primeira Liga	24	8	4	0	10	0	3 (Note: Appearances in Taça da Liga)	1	41	9
Estoril	2014–15	Primeira Liga	3	1	—		—		—		3	1
Estoril	Total		27	9	4	0	10	0	3	1	44	10
Cagliari	2014–15	Serie A	29	5	1	0	—		—		30	5
Cagliari	2015–16	Serie B	38	13	3	0	—		—		41	13
Cagliari	2016–17	Serie A	22	7	0	0	—		2	1	24	8
Cagliari	2017–18	Serie A	22	5	2	1	—		1 (Note: Appearances in Campionato Primavera B)	1	25	7
Cagliari	2018–19	Serie A	34	7	2	0	—		—		36	7
Cagliari	2019–20	Serie A	36	18	3	1	—		—		39	19
Cagliari	2020–21	Serie A	37	16	3	0	—		—		40	16
Cagliari	2021–22	Serie A	37	13	2	0	—		—		39	13
Cagliari	Total		255	84	16	2	0	0	3	2	271	86
Fenerbahçe	2022–23	Süper Lig	20	4	1	0	7	1	—		28	5
Grêmio (loan)	2023	Série A	14	0	1	0	—		—		15	0
Grêmio (loan)	2024	Série A	11	0	1	0	4	0	14 (Note: Appearances in Campeonato Gaúcho)	3	30	3
Grêmio (loan)	Total		25	0	2	0	4	0	14	3	43	3
Hull City	2024–25	Championship	35	6	1	0	—		—		36	6
Atlético San Luis	2025–26	Liga MX	6	6	—		—		2 (Note: Appearances in Leagues Cup)	2	8	8
Career total			419	115	25	2	34	1	26	13	485	131

=== International ===
As of match played 24 March 2022

Appearances and goals by national team and year
National team	Year	Apps	Goals
Italy	2022	1	0
Total		1	0

== Honours ==
Santos

- Recopa Sudamericana: 2012

Cagliari

- Serie B: 2015–16

Fenerbahçe

- Turkish Cup: 2022–23

Grêmio

- Campeonato Gaúcho: 2024

Individual

- Liga MX Best XI: Clausura 2026
- Liga MX Balón de Oro: 2025–26
- Liga MX Best Forward: 2025–26
