= Gabriele Zappa =

Italian footballer (born 1999)

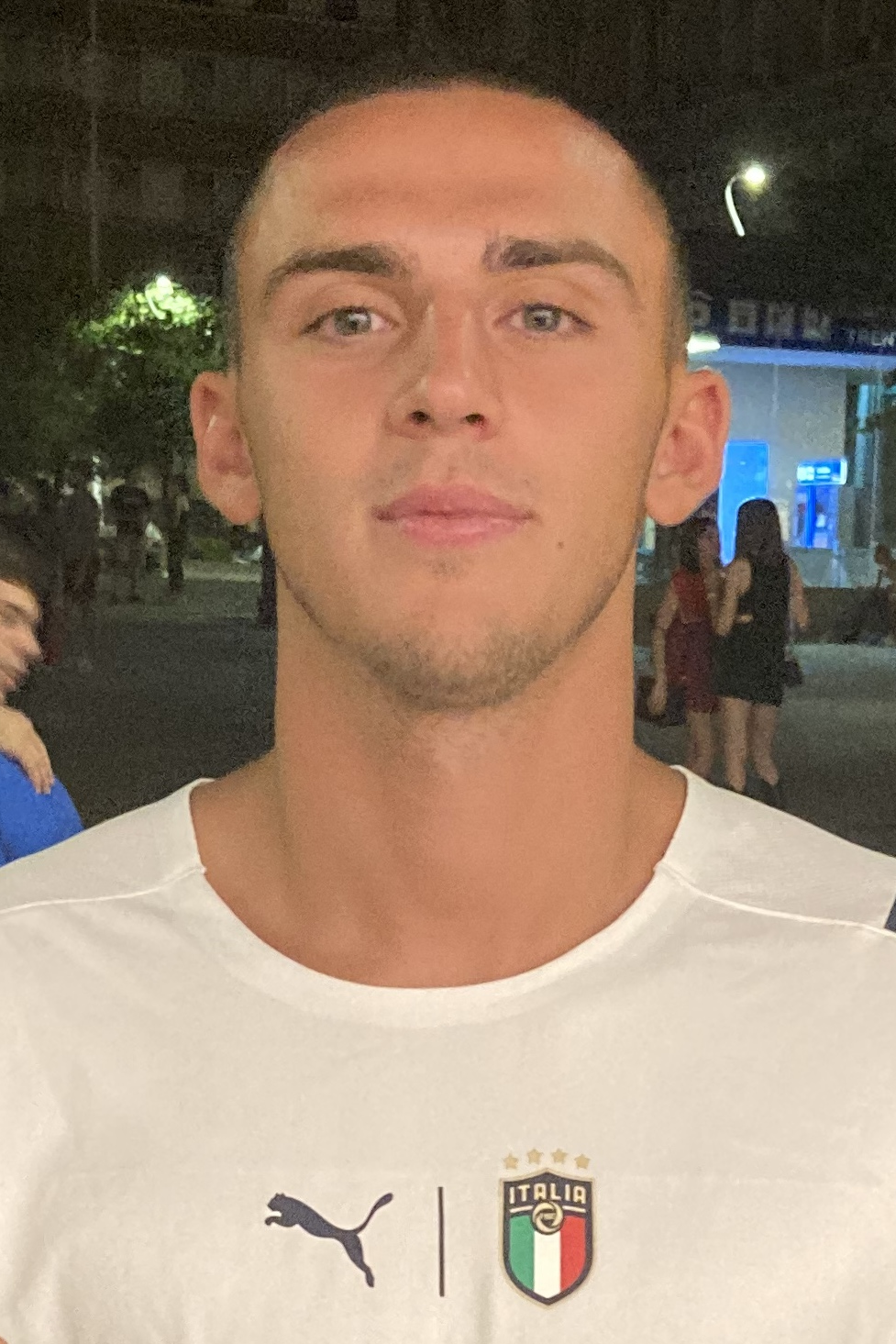
- at Euro 2020 in Monza, Italy

Personal information
- Date of birth: 22 December 1999 (age 26)
- Place of birth: Monza, Italy
- Height: 1.83 m (6 ft 0 in)
- Positions: Right-back; centre-back

Team information
- Current team: Hellas Verona (on loan from Cagliari)
- Number: 4

Youth career
- 2004–2009: COSOV
- 2009–2010: Nuova Usmate
- 2010–2014: Accademia Internazionale
- 2014–2019: Inter Milan
- 2019: Pescara
- 2019: → Inter Milan (loan)

Senior career*
Years	Team	Apps	(Gls)
2019–2021	Pescara	25	(5)
2019	→ Inter Milan (loan)	0	(0)
2020–2021	→ Cagliari (loan)	34	(0)
2021–	Cagliari	161	(6)
2026–	→ Hellas Verona (loan)	4	(1)

International career^{‡}
2016	Italy U18	3	(0)
2018–2020	Italy U20	5	(0)
2020–2021	Italy U21	4	(0)
- * Club domestic league appearances and goals as of 20 September 2026 ‡ National team caps and goals as of 31 May 2021

Gabriele Zappa (born 22 December 1999) is an Italian professional footballer who plays as a right-back or centre-back for Serie B club Hellas Verona, on loan from Cagliari.

== Club career ==
=== Early career ===
Zappa began his youth career at Villasanta-based COSOV aged five, before playing one year for Nuova Usmate and then for Accademia Internazionale.

=== Inter Milan ===
Zappa was raised in the Inter Milan youth sector, and started playing for their under-19 squad in the 2016–17 season. On 10 April 2018, he signed his first professional contract with the club. He played several games for the senior squad in the summer 2018 pre-season, including appearances in the 2018 International Champions Cup.

On 30 January 2019, Inter agreed on his transfer to Pescara, with Pescara loaning him back to Inter for the remainder of the 2018–19 season, and Inter holding a buy-back clause. He was called-up for Inter's senior squad competitive game for the first time on 14 March 2019, for the Europa League game against Eintracht Frankfurt, but remained on the bench.

=== Pescara ===
Zappa joined Pescara on a previously agreed contract for the summer 2019 pre-season. He made his Serie B debut for Pescara on 24 September 2019, in a game against Cittadella. During the match, he replaced Antonio Balzano late in the first half after the latter suffered an injury. Three days later, he made his first Serie B start, against Crotone.

=== Cagliari ===
On 8 September 2020, he joined Serie A side Cagliari on loan from Pescara with an obligation to buy.

==== Loan to Verona ====
On 28 August 2026, Zappa joined Verona on loan with a conditional obligation to buy for €2 million.

== International career ==
In September 2016, Zappa was first called up to represent Italy in friendly games for the under-18 squad.

== Style of play ==
Zappa is a right-back who can also play as a right-sided central defender. He is known for his attacking style and dribbling ability.

== Career statistics ==
As of match played 29 August 2026

Appearances and goals by club, season and competition
Club	Season	League			Coppa Italia		Continental		Total	
Club	Season	Division	Apps	Goals	Apps	Goals	Apps	Goals	Apps	Goals
Pescara	2018–19	Serie B	—		—		—		0	0
Pescara	2019–20	Serie B	25	5	1	0	—		26	5
Pescara	2020–21	Serie B	—		—		—		0	0
Pescara	Total		25	5	1	0	0	0	26	5
Inter Milan (loan)	2018–19	Serie A	—		—		0	0	0	0
Cagliari (loan)	2020–21	Serie A	34	0	2	0	—		36	0
Cagliari	2021–22	Serie A	25	0	3	0	—		28	0
Cagliari	2022–23	Serie B	34	3	2	0	—		36	3
Cagliari	2023–24	Serie A	38	1	2	0	—		40	1
Cagliari	2024–25	Serie A	37	2	3	0	—		40	2
Cagliari	2025–26	Serie A	31	0	2	0	—		33	0
Cagliari	2026–27	Serie A	1	0	0	0	—		1	0
Total		—	200	6	14	0	0	0	214	6
Verona (loan)	2026–27	Serie A	—		—		0	0	0	0
Career total			193	11	13	0	0	0	206	11

== Honours ==
Individual

- Serie A Goal of the Month: November 2024
