= Riccardo Sottil =

Italian footballer (born 1999)

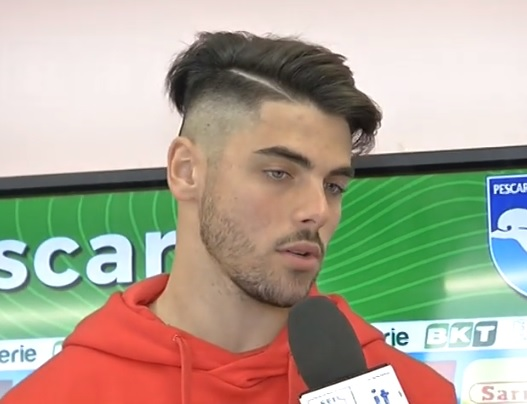
- Sottil with Pescara in 2019

Personal information
- Date of birth: 3 June 1999 (age 27)
- Place of birth: Turin, Italy
- Height: 1.80 m (5 ft 11 in)
- Position: Left winger

Team information
- Current team: Fiorentina

Youth career
- –2013: Genoa
- 2013–2016: Torino
- 2016–2018: Fiorentina

Senior career*
Years	Team	Apps	(Gls)
2018–	Fiorentina	102	(6)
2019	→ Pescara (loan)	10	(1)
2020–2021	→ Cagliari (loan)	21	(2)
2025	→ AC Milan (loan)	6	(0)
2025–2026	→ Lecce (loan)	21	(1)

International career^{‡}
2016–2017	Italy U18	3	(0)
2017	Italy U19	1	(0)
2018–2019	Italy U20	3	(0)
2019–2021	Italy U21	12	(3)
- * Club domestic league appearances and goals as of 25 May 2026 ‡ National team caps and goals as of 31 May 2021

Riccardo Sottil (born 3 June 1999) is an Italian professional footballer who plays as left winger for Serie A club Fiorentina.

== Club career ==
=== Fiorentina ===
Sottil joined Fiorentina youth teams in January 2016. He was first called up to Fiorentina's senior squad late in the 2017–18 season.

He made his Serie A debut for Fiorentina on 19 September 2018 in a game against Sampdoria as an 82nd-minute substitute for Federico Chiesa.

==== Loan to Pescara ====
On 27 January 2019, Sottil joined to Serie B side Pescara on loan until 30 June 2019.

==== Loan to Cagliari ====
On 10 September 2020, Sottil joined to Serie A side Cagliari on loan until 30 June 2021 with an option to buy.

==== Loan to AC Milan ====
On 3 February 2025, Sottil joined AC Milan on loan by signing a contract until the end of the 2024–25 season, with an option of a permanent move.

==== Loan to Lecce ====
On 10 August 2025, Sottil moved on loan to Lecce in Serie A.

== International career ==
Sottil was first called up to represent his country in August 2016, for Italy national under-18 football team friendlies.

In October 2017, he made one appearance in the 2018 UEFA European Under-19 Championship qualification. He was not selected for the final tournament.

In 2018, he was included in the Italy U20 squad hat played at the 2018–19 Under 20 Elite League. He made his debut with the Italy U21 on 6 September 2019, in a friendly match won 4–0 against Moldova.

== Personal life ==
His father Andrea Sottil is a football coach and a former player who played 14 seasons in the Serie A.

== Career statistics ==
As of match played 4 October 2025

Appearances and goals by club, season and competition
Club	Season	League			Coppa Italia		Europe		Other		Total	
Club	Season	Division	Apps	Goals	Apps	Goals	Apps	Goals	Apps	Goals	Apps	Goals
Fiorentina	2018–19	Serie A	2	0	0	0	—		—		2	0
Fiorentina	2019–20	Serie A	18	0	3	0	—		—		21	0
Fiorentina	2021–22	Serie A	24	3	5	1	—		—		29	4
Fiorentina	2022–23	Serie A	18	0	2	0	6 (Note: Appearances in UEFA Europa Conference League)	1	—		26	1
Fiorentina	2023–24	Serie A	22	2	1	1	11	2	1 (Note: Appearance in Supercoppa Italiana)	0	35	5
Fiorentina	2024–25	Serie A	18	1	1	1	6 (Note: Appearances in UEFA Conference League)	3	—		25	5
Fiorentina	Total		102	6	12	3	23	6	1	0	138	15
Pescara (loan)	2018–19	Serie B	10	1	0	0	—		2 (Note: Appearances in Serie B promotion play-offs)	0	12	1
Cagliari (loan)	2020–21	Serie A	21	2	3	2	—		—		24	4
Milan (loan)	2024–25	Serie A	6	0	2	0	0	0	—		8	0
Lecce (loan)	2025–26	Serie A	5	1	0	0	—		—		5	1
Career total			144	10	17	5	23	6	3	0	187	21

== Honours ==
Fiorentina

- Coppa Italia runner-up: 2022–23
- UEFA Conference League runner-up 2022–23
