= Simone Pinna =

Sardinian footballer

Personal information
- Date of birth: 17 October 1997 (age 29)
- Place of birth: Oristano, Italy
- Height: 1.72 m (5 ft 8 in)
- Position: Defender

Team information
- Current team: Monastir
- Number: 25

Youth career
- –2016: Cagliari

Senior career*
Years	Team	Apps	(Gls)
2016–2021	Cagliari	1	(0)
2016–2019	→ Olbia (loan)	87	(0)
2020	→ Empoli (loan)	5	(0)
2021	→ Ascoli (loan)	7	(0)
2021–2022	Olbia	26	(0)
2022	Costa Orientale Sarda	7	(0)
2023	SP Tharros		
2023-	Monastir	25	(2)
- * Club domestic league appearances and goals as of 22 March 2026

Simone Pinna (born 17 October 1997) is an Italian footballer who plays as a defender for Monastir.

== Club career ==
He made his Serie C debut for Olbia on 4 September 2016 in a game against Lucchese.

He made his Serie A debut for Cagliari on 25 August 2019, playing a full game against Brescia.

On 9 January 2020, he joined Empoli in Serie B on loan.

On 11 January 2021 he moved on loan to Ascoli.

On 31 August 2021, he returned to Olbia on a permanent basis and signed a two-year contract.

On 1 September 2022, Pinna's contract with Olbia was terminated by mutual consent.

On 14 October 2022, he signed with COS Sarrabus, terminating his contract two months later.

On 3 February 2023, Pinna moved to Tharros.

On 27 August 2023, he joined Monastir.
