= Jacopo Desogus =

Italian footballer (born 2002)

Personal information
- Date of birth: 1 October 2002 (age 24)
- Place of birth: Cagliari, Italy
- Height: 1.76 m (5 ft 9 in)
- Position: Winger

Team information
- Current team: AlbinoLeffe
- Number: 70

Youth career
- 2012–2021: Cagliari

Senior career*
Years	Team	Apps	(Gls)
2021–2024	Cagliari	1	(0)
2022–2023	→ Pescara (loan)	21	(1)
2024	→ Gubbio (loan)	13	(1)
2024–2026	Cittadella	31	(1)
2026	→ Pro Patria (loan)	17	(5)
2026–	AlbinoLeffe	1	(0)

International career^{‡}
2022	Italy U20	1	(0)
- * Club domestic league appearances and goals as of 22 August 2026 ‡ National team caps and goals as of 22:00, 7 June 2022 (UTC)

Jacopo Desogus (born 1 October 2002) is an Italian professional footballer who plays as a winger for Serie C Group A club AlbinoLeffe.

== Club career ==
Born in Cagliari and raised in the nearby town of Gergei, Desogus joined Cagliari's academy in 2012. After coming through the club's youth ranks, he made his professional debut on 15 December 2021, coming on a substitute for Charalampos Lykogiannis in a 3–1 Coppa Italia win over Cittadella. He subsequently signed his first professional contract with Cagliari in January 2022, penning a four-year deal.

On 13 August 2022, he made his league debut for Cagliari, starting the Serie B match against Como, which ended in a 1–1 draw.

On 1 September 2022, Desogus joined Serie C club Pescara on a season-long loan. On 11 December, he scored his first professional goal in a 2–1 league win over Monopoli.

On 1 February 2024, Desogus was loaned to Serie C club Gubbio until the end of the season.

On 28 June 2024, it was announced that Desogus would join Serie B club Cittadella on a permanent deal on 1 July.

== International career ==
Desogus has been a youth international for Italy, having played for the under-20 national team.

== Style of play ==
Desogus is a right-footed winger, who primarily plays as an inverted left-winger, but can also operate in several other attacking positions. He has been praised for his dribbling skills, as well as his technique and his athleticism.
