= Alessandro Deiola =

Italian footballer (born 1995)

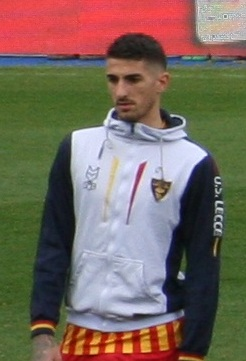
- Deiola with Lecce in 2020

Personal information
- Date of birth: 1 August 1995 (age 31)
- Place of birth: San Gavino Monreale, Italy
- Height: 1.89 m (6 ft 2 in)
- Position: Defensive midfielder

Team information
- Current team: Cagliari
- Number: 14

Youth career
- –2014: Cagliari

Senior career*
Years	Team	Apps	(Gls)
2014–	Cagliari	202	(12)
2014–2015	→ Tuttocuoio (loan)	33	(4)
2016–2017	→ Spezia (loan)	14	(1)
2018–2019	→ Parma (loan)	10	(0)
2020	→ Lecce (loan)	10	(1)
2020–2021	→ Spezia (loan)	12	(0)
- * Club domestic league appearances and goals as of 25 May 2026

Alessandro Deiola (born 1 August 1995) is an Italian footballer who plays as a central or defensive midfielder for Serie A club Cagliari.

== Career ==
Born in San Gavino Monreale, Province of South Sardinia, Sardinia, Deiola began his career at nearby Cagliari. For the 2014–15 season, he was loaned to Tuttocuoio in Lega Pro. He made his debut for the Pisan club on 30 August 2014, playing the full 90 minutes in a goalless home draw against Carrarese. His first goal came on 28 September, a fifth-minute opener in a 3–2 defeat at AC Pistoiese; in total he scored four goals in 33 games, all but two as a starter.

On 9 August 2015, Deiola made his Cagliari debut, playing the full 90 minutes of a 5–0 win over Virtus Entella at the Stadio Sant'Elia in the Coppa Italia second round, scoring the final goal. He headed the opener in the 1–1 draw at Trapani in the next round six days later, with his team advancing in a penalty shootout.

On the last day of the winter transfer market session in 2017, he returned from the loan to Cagliari.

On 17 August 2018, he joined Parma on loan. He returned to Cagliari on 22 January 2019.

On 10 January 2020, he joined Lecce on loan with a purchase option.

On 22 September 2020, Deiola returned to Spezia on loan for the 2020–21 season. He made 12 Serie A appearances for the side before Cagliari requested his early return in January 2021.

== Career statistics ==
As of match played 14 August 2026

Appearances and goals by club, season and competition
Club	Season	League			National Cup		Continental		Total	
Club	Season	Division	Apps	Goals	Apps	Goals	Apps	Goals	Apps	Goals
Tuttocuoio (loan)	2014–15	Serie C	33	4	2	0	—		35	4
Cagliari	2015–16	Serie B	21	2	4	1	—		25	3
Cagliari	2016–17	Serie A	5	0	1	0	—		6	0
Spezia (loan)	2016–17	Serie B	14	1	2	0	—		16	1
Cagliari	2017–18	Serie A	13	0	1	0	—		14	0
Parma (loan)	2018–19	Serie A	10	0	0	0	—		10	0
Cagliari	2018–19	Serie A	10	0	0	0	—		10	0
Cagliari	2019–20	Serie A	1	0	1	0	—		2	0
Lecce (loan)	2019–20	Serie A	10	1	0	0	—		10	1
Spezia (loan)	2020–21	Serie A	12	0	3	0	—		15	0
Spezia (loan)	Total		26	1	5	0	0	0	31	1
Cagliari	2020–21	Serie A	12	0	0	0	—		12	0
Cagliari	2021–22	Serie A	33	4	2	2	—		35	6
Cagliari	2022–23	Serie B	31	3	1	0	—		32	3
Cagliari	2023–24	Serie A	27	1	3	0	—		30	1
Cagliari	2024–25	Serie A	29	2	3	0	—		32	2
Cagliari	2025–26	Serie A	20	0	3	0	—		23	0
Cagliari	2026–27	Serie A	0	0	1	1	—		1	1
Cagliari	Total		202	12	20	4	0	0	222	16
Career total			281	18	27	4	0	0	306	22
