= Luca Gagliano =

Italian footballer (born 2000)

Personal information
- Date of birth: 14 July 2000 (age 26)
- Place of birth: Alghero, Italy
- Height: 1.82 m (6 ft 0 in)
- Position: Forward

Team information
- Current team: Latina
- Number: 14

Youth career
- 2005–2014: Catalunya Alghero
- 2014–2020: Cagliari

Senior career*
Years	Team	Apps	(Gls)
2020–2022	Cagliari	3	(1)
2020–2021	→ Olbia (loan)	19	(1)
2021	→ Avellino (loan)	14	(3)
2022–2024	Padova	14	(0)
2023–2024	→ Potenza (loan)	19	(1)
2024	→ Foggia (loan)	14	(3)
2024–2025	Audace Cerignola	8	(1)
2025	→ Rimini (loan)	12	(2)
2025–	Latina	7	(1)
2026	→ Desenzano (loan)	9	(2)
- * Club domestic league appearances and goals as of 23 August 2026

Luca Gagliano (born 14 July 2000) is an Italian professional footballer who plays as a forward for Serie C Group B club Latina.

== Club career ==
=== Cagliari ===
Gagliano joined the youth academy of Cagliari in 2014. Gagliano made his professional debut with Cagliari in a 2–1 Serie A defeat to Lazio on 23 July 2020. He scored his first goal in the following match against Juventus, won 2–0 by Cagliari. He also became the first player born in the 21st century to score a goal against Juventus.

==== Loan to Olbia ====
On 9 September he extended his contract for Cagliari until 2023. On the same day he went to Olbia on loan.

==== Loan to Avellino ====
On 20 August 2021, he joined Avellino on loan. On 4 January 2022, he was recalled from loan.

=== Padova ===
On 9 July 2022, Gagliano signed a three-year deal with Padova. On 22 July 2023, Gagliano joined Potenza on loan. On 1 February 2024, Gagliano was loaned by Foggia.
