= Alessandro Tripaldelli =

Italian association football player (born 1999)

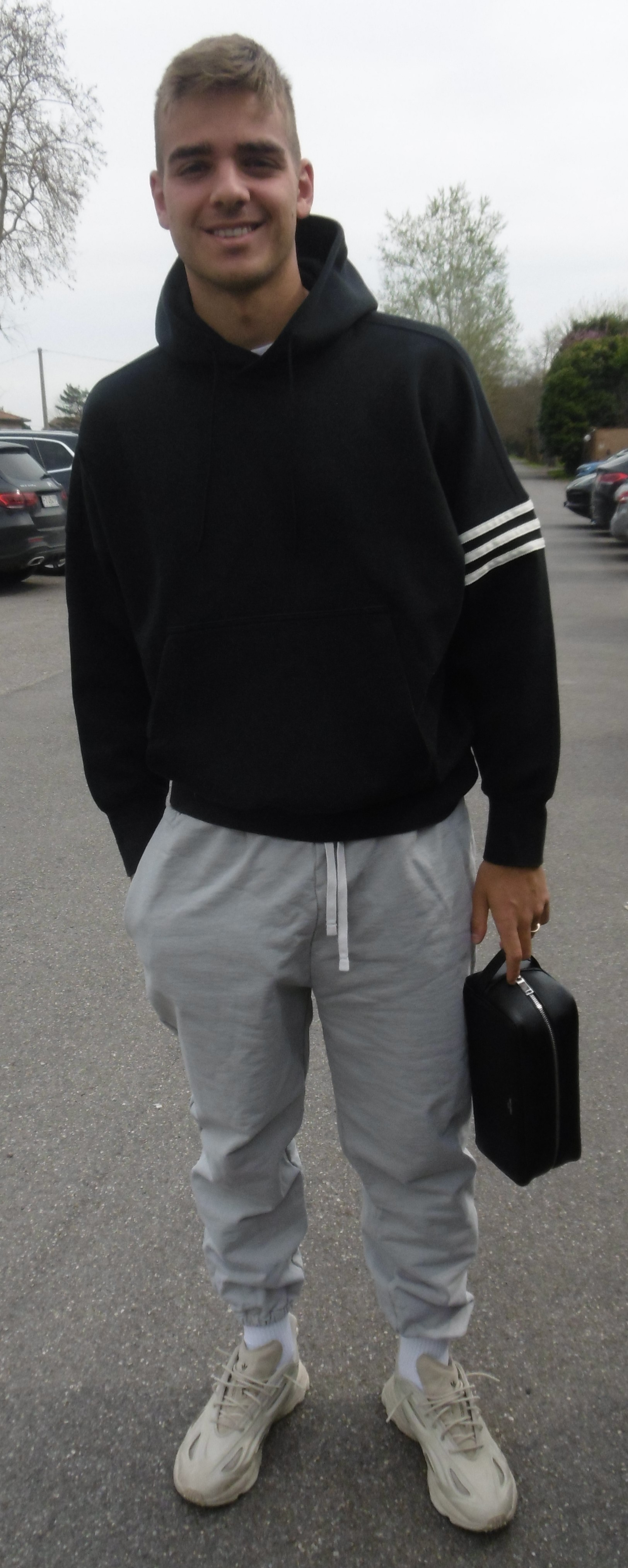

Personal information
- Full name: Alessandro Tripaldelli
- Date of birth: 9 February 1999 (age 27)
- Place of birth: Naples, Italy
- Height: 1.82 m (6 ft 0 in)
- Position: Left back

Team information
- Current team: Reggiana
- Number: 33

Youth career
- 2012–2018: Juventus
- 2018: Sassuolo
- 2018: → Juventus (loan)

Senior career*
Years	Team	Apps	(Gls)
2018–2020	Sassuolo	2	(0)
2018–2019	→ PEC Zwolle (loan)	2	(0)
2019	→ Crotone (loan)	3	(0)
2020–2022	Cagliari	10	(0)
2021–2022	→ SPAL (loan)	19	(0)
2022–2024	SPAL	51	(1)
2024–2025	Bari	8	(0)
2025–	Reggiana	15	(0)

International career^{‡}
2014–2015	Italy U16	6	(0)
2015–2016	Italy U17	13	(1)
2016–2017	Italy U18	4	(0)
2016–2018	Italy U19	19	(0)
2018–2019	Italy U20	11	(0)
2019–2020	Italy U21	3	(0)
- * Club domestic league appearances and goals as of 13 May 2026 ‡ National team caps and goals as of 3 September 2020

Alessandro Tripaldelli (born 9 February 1999) is an Italian professional footballer who plays as a left back for Serie C Group B club Reggiana.

== Club career ==
He is a product of Juventus youth teams and started playing for their Under-19 squad in the 2017–18 season. He appeared for their Under-19 squad in the 2016–17 UEFA Youth League and 2017–18 UEFA Youth League.

On 30 January 2018, he was sold by Juventus to Sassuolo for 1.5 million euros and loaned back to Juventus for the remainder of the 2017–18 season.

On 31 August 2018, he joined Dutch club PEC Zwolle on a season-long loan. He made his Eredivisie debut for PEC Zwolle on 16 September 2018 in a game against Vitesse, as a starter.

On 10 January 2019, Tripaldelli joined Serie B side Crotone on loan.

On 28 September 2019, he played his first game in Serie A with Sassuolo.

On 17 September 2020, he joined Serie A side Cagliari.

On 15 August 2021, Tripaldelli joined SPAL on loan with an obligation to buy.

On 30 August 2024, Tripaldelli signed a three-year contract with Bari.

On 1 September 2025, Tripaldelli moved to Reggiana on a two-season deal.

== International career ==
Tripaldelli was first called up to represent his country in September 2014 for Italy national under-16 football team friendlies.

He was selected to the U17 squad for the 2016 UEFA European Under-17 Championship, in which Italy did not advance from the group stage.

He was the starter for the U19 squad at the 2018 UEFA European Under-19 Championship, where Italy finished as runners-up to Portugal.

== Honours ==
Italy U19

- UEFA European Under-19 Championship runner-up: 2018
