= Federico Marigosu =

Italian footballer (born 2001)

Personal information
- Date of birth: 21 April 2001 (age 25)
- Place of birth: Cagliari, Italy
- Height: 1.76 m (5 ft 9 in)
- Position: Midfielder

Team information
- Current team: Vigor Lamezia
- Number: 7

Youth career
- Decimo 07
- –2020: Cagliari

Senior career*
Years	Team	Apps	(Gls)
2020–2022	Cagliari	2	(0)
2020–2021	→ Olbia (loan)	18	(1)
2021–2022	→ Grosseto (loan)	9	(0)
2022–2024	Trapani	49	(8)
2024	Prato	13	(0)
2024–2025	Matera	9	(1)
2025–	Vigor Lamezia	0	(0)

International career
2016	Italy U16	2	(0)
2019–2020	Italy U19	4	(0)
- * Club domestic league appearances and goals as of 17 February 2026

Federico Marigosu (born 21 April 2001) is an Italian professional footballer who plays as a midfielder for Serie D club Vigor Lamezia.

== Club career ==
He was raised in Cagliari junior teams and made his Serie A debut for the club on 26 July 2020 in a game against Udinese.

On 11 September 2020, he joined Olbia on loan.

On 13 July 2021, he moved on loan to Grosseto.

On 27 July 2022, Marigosu signed with Trapani in Serie D.

== Club statistics ==
=== Club ===
As of match played 31 October 2021

Club	Season	League			National cup		League cup		Total	
Club	Season	Division	Apps	Goals	Apps	Goals	Apps	Goals	Apps	Goals
Cagliari	2019–20	Serie A	2	0	0	0	-		2	0
Olbia (loan)	2020–21	Serie C	18	1	-		-		18	1
Grosseto (loan)	2021–22	Serie C	9	0	-		2	0	11	0
Career total			29	1	0	0	2	0	31	1
