= Unipol Domus =

Football stadium in Cagliari (Italy)

Coordinates: 39°12′00″N 09°08′15″E

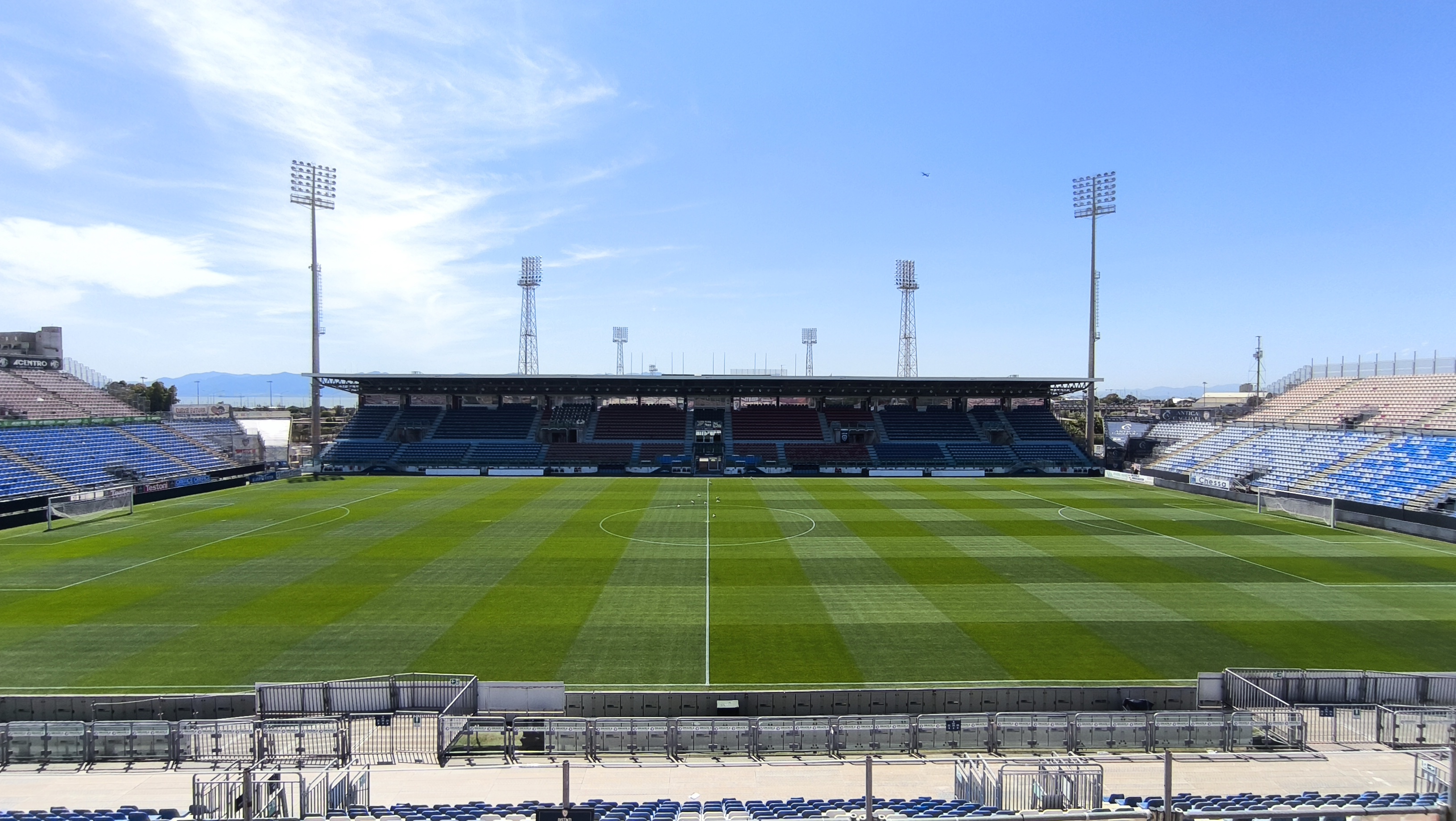
- Unipol Domus as seen from the Distinti sector in 2026
- Interactive map of Unipol Domus
- Former names: Sardegna Arena (2017–21)
- Location: Cagliari, Sardinia, Italy
- Owner: Cagliari Calcio
- Capacity: 16,412
- Surface: Grass
- Field size: 105x65 m

Construction
- Groundbreaking: 2017
- Built: 2017
- Opened: 10 September 2017
- Renovated: 2018
- Cost: €8,000,000

Tenants
- Cagliari Calcio (2017–present); Italy national football team (selected matches)

The Unipol Domus is a football stadium in Cagliari, Sardinia, Italy. Built in 2017 as Sardegna Arena, it has hosted Cagliari Calcio football matches since the 2017–18 season, following the closure and partial demolition of Stadio Sant'Elia. It was used as a provisional stadium until 2021 when the construction was fully completed and name changed to Unipol Domus.

In European competitions, the stadium is known as Cagliari Calcio Arena due to advertising rules.
