= Periša =

Periša (Периша)
- Gender: Masculine
- Language: Serbian

Origin
- Region of origin: Balkans

Other names
- Derivative: Perišić (surname)
- Related names: Perica, Pera, Pero, Pejo

Periša (Serbian: Периша) is a Serbian masculine given name and nickname, a combination of the diminutive Pera (derived from Petar) with the suffix -iša, (as found in Dragiša, Radiša, Siniša, etc.). It has been used in Serbian society since the Middle Ages. It is the base for the patronymic Perišić. It may refer to:

- Periša Gošić (fl. 1750), officer (barjaktar) in Potisje Frontier, from Novi Kovilj.
- Periša Savić (fl. 1807–d. 1817), Serbian rebel buljubaša, from Miokovci, knez of Karadak knežina (1816–17).
- Petar–Periša, father of Toma Vučić Perišić (1787–1859).
- Several soldiers in the Serbian–Ottoman Wars (1876–1878).
- Periša Vuković (fl. 1868), Serbian National Assembly representative in the Moravica okrug.
- Periša Perišić (fl. 1900–13), Serbian infantry captain.
- Periša Perišić (fl. 1941), Serbian Partisan.
- Periša Damljanović (fl. 1920–43), Serbian Partisan, his house was an illegal publishing house during World War II.
- Periša Savelić (1920–1942), Montenegrin Partisan active in Macedonia.
- Petar Dobrijević–Periša (1890–1944), Chetnik.
- Periša Milić (1901–1982), Yugoslav Serbian sculptor, designed medals.
- Petar Vukotić–Periša (1899–1988), Yugoslav Montenegrin architect who designed several schools.
- Periša Pešukić (b. 1997), Montenegrin footballer

== Annotations ==
1. Such as Periša Valjević, soldier (pešak) from Trnjane, Rudnik okrug; Periša Obradović, soldier (redov) in the Javor corps; Periša Poledica (d. 1878), medic in the Javor corps, from Užice okrug; Periša Stoić, senior officer (vodnik) in the Morava corps; Periša Dugalić, soldier (redov) in the Morava corps; Periša Planojević, soldier (redov) in the Morava corps; Periša Filipović, junior officer (desetar) in the Šumadija corps;

== Sources ==
- Grković, Milica (1977). Rečnik ličnih imena kod Srba. Belgrade: Vuk Karadžić.
- Vrhovna komanda Srpske Vojske (1879). Рат Србије са Турском за ослобођење и независност 1877-78. године. Državna štamparija.
