= Pejović =

Pejović (Serbian: Пејовић) is a Serbo-Croatian surname, a patronymic of Pejo, a diminutive of Petar. It may refer to:

- Aco Pejović (born 1972), Serbian popular pop-folk singer
- Aleksandar Pejović (born 1990), Serbian professional footballer
- Danilo Pejović (1928–2007), Croatian philosopher
- Dragiša Pejović (born 1982), Serbian footballer
- Filip Pejović (born 1982), Serbian former professional footballer
- Luka Pejović (born 1985), Montenegrin international footballer
- Luka Pejović (footballer, born 1994), Croatian footballer
- Mitar Pejović (born 1983), Serbian football goalkeeper
- Srećko Pejović (born 1953), Serbian Olympic sport shooter who competed for Yugoslavia
- Vlada Pejović (born 1950), Serbian former football manager and player
- Žarko Pejović (born 1986), Montenegrin handball player
- Zvezdan Pejović (born 1966), Montenegrin former professional footballer

== See also ==
- Pejić
- Pajović
- Pejaković
- Pejinović
- Pejčinović
- Perović
