= Pejčinović =

Pejčinović (Serbian Cyrillic: Пејчиновић, pronounced [pejtʃǐːnoʋitɕ]) is a Serbo-Croatian surname, a patronymic derived from Pejčin, itself a patronymic of Pejo, a diminutive of Petar (Peter).

Notable people with the name include:

- Davor Pejčinović (born 1971), retired Croatian basketballer
- Nemanja Pejčinović (born 1987), Serbian footballer

== See also ==
- Pejović
- Pejić
