= Peros =

Peros is a surname. Notable people with the surname include:

- Luka Peroš (born 1976), Croatian actor
- Nick Peros (born 1963), Canadian classical composer
- Steven Peros, American playwright, screenwriter, director and television writer

== See also ==
- Pero (name)
