= Veliko Brdo =

Veliko Brdo may refer to:

- Veliko Brdo, Slovenia, a village near Ilirska Bistrica
- Veliko Brdo, Croatia, a village near Makarska
