= Pejić =

Pejić (Serbian: Пејић) is a Serbo-Croatian surname, derived from the diminutive Peja (from Petar, Predrag, etc.). It may refer to:

- Mihailo Pejić (1750–1812), Serbian Orthodox archpriest
- Andreja Pejić, Bosnian-Australian top model
- Jelena Pejić, Miss Serbia and Montenegro 2004
- Katarina Pejić, mother of Yugoslav writer Ivo Andrić
- Marko Pejić, Croatian footballer
- Mel Pejic, English footballer of Serb descent
- Mihajlo Pejić, US WW II Medal of Honor recipient of Serb descent
- Mike Pejic, English footballer of Serb descent
- Miroslav Pejić, Bosnian Croat footballer of Croat descent
- Pero Pejić, Croatian footballer
- Shaun Pejic, English-born Welsh footballer of Serb descent
- Stefan Pejic (born 1988), Welsh actor

== See also ==
- Pejović
- Pejčinović
- Perić
