= Perica =

Perica (Serbian: Перица, Serbo-Croatian pronunciation: [peˈritsa]) is a Croat and Serb given name, used mostly for men but also for women. It is also prevalent as a surname. Perica is a diminutive of Petar or Petra, translating to Pete and Peter, or Petra in English, respectively.

In Croatian and Serbian popular culture Perica often portrays a stereotype of an innocent or mischievous young boy with a very straightforward way of thinking. An example is Perica Šafranek in the 1970 classic Croatian (then Yugoslav) comedy film Tko pjeva zlo ne misli. He is common in jokes and is similar to Little Johnny in English.

== Given name ==
- Perica Bukić, Croatian water polo player and politician
- Perica Ivetić, Bosnian footballer
- Perica Marošević, American Major League Soccer player
- Perica Ognjenović, Serbian soccer player
- Perica Radić, Serbian soccer player
- Perica Stančeski, Macedonian soccer player
- Perica Vlašić, Croatian rower
- Perica Vukičević, handball player

== Surname ==
- Kristina Perica, Croatian sprinter
- Petar Perica, Croatian Catholic priest
- Rose Perica Mofford (maiden name of Perica that was kept as middle name), Governor of Arizona from 1988 to 1991
- Stipe Perica, Croatian professional footballer
- Vjekoslav Perica, Croatian writer and academic
- Zlatko Perica, guitarist
- Filip Perica, Croatian international rugby player

== See also ==
- Pero (name)
- Ivica
