= Pejo =

Pejo is a Serbo-Croatian masculine given name, a diminutive form of the name Petar.

Notable people with the name include:

- Pejo Ćošković (born 1952), Bosnian medievalist
- Pejo Kuprešak (born 1992), Croatian football player

== See also ==
- Pejović
- Pejić
- Pejčinović
- Pajo (given name), a diminutive of Pavao/Pavle
- Peugeot, a French automaker pronounced as "Pejo" in most countries
