= Mitchell Paige =

US Marine Corps Medal of Honor recipient

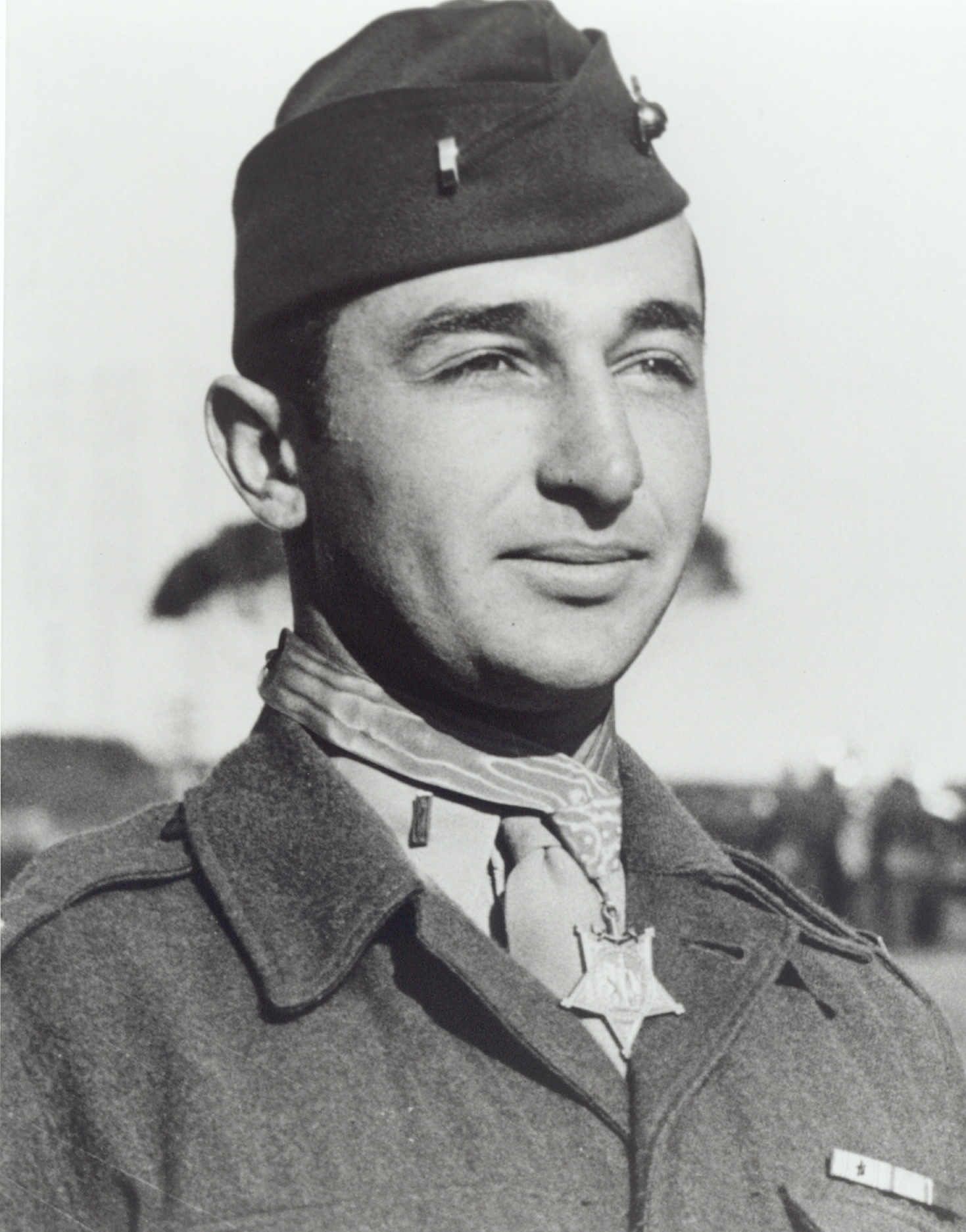
- 2nd Lt. Mitchell Paige(Mihajlo Pejić)
- Born: August 31, 1918; Charleroi, Pennsylvania, US
- Died: November 15, 2003 (aged 85); La Quinta, California, US
- Burial place: Riverside National Cemetery
- Military career
- Allegiance: United States
- Branch: United States Marine Corps
- Service years: 1936–1959
- Rank: Colonel
- Nickname: Mitch
- Unit: 2nd Battalion, 7th Marines
- Conflicts: World War II: Battle of Guadalcanal; Cape Gloucester; Korean War
- Awards: Medal of Honor; Purple Heart; Combat Action Ribbon

Mitchell Paige (August 31, 1918 – November 15, 2003) was an American retired United States Marine Corps colonel who received the nation's highest military decoration for valor in combat, the Medal of Honor, during World War II.

On October 26, 1942, after thirty-three Marines in his machine gun platoon were killed or wounded defending a ridge during the Battle of Guadalcanal, Platoon Sergeant Paige operated four machine guns, singlehandedly stopping an entire Japanese regiment. He also led a bayonet charge afterwards.

== Early life ==
Paige was born in Charleroi, Pennsylvania. His parents were ethnic Serbs, immigrants from the Herzegovina, originally surnamed Pejić. His mother kept him and his brother in touch with their roots, reminding them of the Battle of Kosovo, but also told them to be proud Americans. His family later moved to the Camden Hills neighborhood of West Mifflin. He graduated from McKeesport High School before enlisting in the US Marine Corps.

== Military service ==
Paige enlisted in the Marine Corps on September 1, 1936, at Baltimore, Maryland, and completed his boot camp training at Parris Island, South Carolina. In November 1936, he was transferred to Quantico, Virginia, and later served as a gunner aboard the USS Wyoming. While aboard the Wyoming, he took part in maneuvers via Panama to San Clemente Island off the coast of California. In February 1937, he was transferred to Mare Island Navy Yard for guard duty, and two months later was ordered to Cavite in the Philippine Islands. While on Cavite, he became a member of the All-Navy-Marine baseball team, which gained prominence throughout the islands and the Orient. He served in China from October 1938 to September 1939 and during his tour he guarded American property during the famous Tientsin flood. He left North China and returned to the U.S. in April 1940 for guard duty at the Brooklyn and Philadelphia Navy Yards. In September, he rejoined the 5th Marines, at Quantico, and the following month participated in maneuvers at Guantanamo Bay, Cuba, and Culebra, Puerto Rico.

In March 1941, Paige was transferred back to the United States and ordered to New River, North Carolina, to help construct and prepare a new Marine Corps training base, which later became Camp Lejeune. After the Japanese attack on Pearl Harbor in December, he was sent again overseas with the 7th Marines and landed at Apia, British Samoa. From Samoa, the 7th Marines landed on Guadalcanal in September 1942. On October 26, he earned the nation's highest decoration for valor, the Medal of Honor, during the campaign for Guadalcanal, specifically the Battle for Henderson Field, when he made a desperate stand against Japanese troops after they had broken through the lines and killed or wounded all of the other Marines in his machine gun section. Platoon Sergeant Paige fired his machine gun until it was destroyed, then moved from gun to gun, keeping up a withering fire until he finally received reinforcements. He later led a bayonet charge that drove the Japanese back and prevented a breakthrough in American lines. While on Guadalcanal, he was commissioned a second lieutenant in the field on December 19, 1942.

Paige remained on Guadalcanal until January 1943, when he went to Melbourne, Australia, with the 1st Marine Division. The Marine Corps’ World War II Commandant, General Alexander A. Vandegrift, presented the Medal of Honor to Second Lieutenant Paige in Melbourne. In June, he was promoted to first lieutenant. In September, First Lieutenant Paige left with the 1st Marine Division for New Guinea where the Marines joined with the 6th Army for the attack on Cape Gloucester, New Britain, on December 26. In May 1944, the division left Cape Gloucester for a rest area in the Russell Islands, Pavuvu. In July, First Lieutenant Paige was sent back to the United States and assigned duty at Camp Lejeune, North Carolina. He was promoted to captain on February 28, 1945. In June, Captain Paige became Tactical Training Officer at Camp Matthews, California, and the following September, was sent to the Marine Corps Recruit Depot as a recruit training officer. In May 1946, he was placed on inactive duty.

In July 1950, Paige returned to active duty again at the beginning of the Korean War, and was assigned duty at Camp Pendleton, Oceanside, California. He was later transferred to the Marine Corps Recruit Depot at San Diego, California, as Plans and Operations Officer of the 2nd Recruit Training Battalion. At this time, he also went on a special assignment as plans and training officer in charge of setting up a Platoon Leader's Course training program for the Special Training Company. He was promoted to the rank of major on January 1, 1951. In October, Major Paige became executive officer of the 2nd Recruit Training Battalion, Marine Corps Recruit Depot San Diego, California, until October 1952, when he was transferred to the 4th Special Junior Course at Marine Corps Schools, Quantico. He attended school there until May 1953, then served as division recruiting officer, 2nd Marine Division, Camp Lejeune, North Carolina, until February 1954.

Major Paige was next assigned to Sub-Unit #2, Headquarters Company, Headquarters Battalion, 3rd Marine Division, San Francisco, California, serving as officer in charge, Division Non-Commissioned Officers School until April 1955. During this period he also served briefly as assistant officer in charge of Sub-Unit #1. From there, he served as battalion executive officer and later commanding officer of the 3rd Battalion, 7th Marines, 1st Marine Division at Camp Pendleton, from April to August 1955, when he reported to the 12th Marine Corps Reserve and Recruitment District to serve as officer in charge of Marine Corps Recruiting Station in San Francisco.

Paige was promoted to lieutenant colonel in May 1957. In August that year, Lieutenant Colonel Paige was assigned duty as inspector-instructor, 7th Infantry Battalion, USMCR, at San Bruno, California, until August 1958, when he was detached to Headquarters Marine Corps, Washington, D.C. In May 1959, he entered the U.S. Army Language School in Monterey, California, and remained there for nine months until he was ordered to the Marine Barracks, U.S. Naval Station, San Diego, California, to serve as executive officer until October that year.

On November 1, 1959, Paige was placed on the Marine Corps Disability Retired List and promoted to colonel for being specially commended for performance of duty in actual combat.

== Later life and death ==
In 1975, a book Paige wrote was published about his experiences titled A Marine Named Mitch. In his later years, he worked to identify imposters wearing or selling the Medal of Honor.

On November 15, 2003, Paige died of congestive heart failure at his home in La Quinta, California at the age of 85. He was the last surviving Medal of Honor recipient of the Guadalcanal campaign. He was buried with full military honors at the Riverside National Cemetery in Riverside, California.

== Medal of Honor citation ==
The President of the United States takes pride in presenting the MEDAL OF HONOR to

PLATOON SERGEANT MITCHELL PAIGE
UNITED STATES MARINE CORPS

for service as set forth in the following
CITATION:

For extraordinary heroism and conspicuous gallantry in action above and beyond the call of duty while serving with the Second Battalion, Seventh Marines, First Marine Division, in combat against enemy Japanese forces in the Solomon Islands Area on October 26, 1942. When the enemy broke through the line directly in front of his position, Platoon Sergeant Paige, commanding a machine-gun section with fearless determination, continued to direct the fire of his gunners until all his men were either killed or wounded. Alone, against the deadly hail of Japanese shells, he manned his gun, and when it was destroyed, took over another, moving from gun to gun, never ceasing his withering fire against the advancing hordes until reinforcements finally arrived. Then, forming a new line, he dauntlessly and aggressively led a bayonet charge, driving the enemy back and preventing a break through in our lines. His great personal valor and unyielding devotion to duty were in keeping with the highest traditions of the United States Naval Service.

/S/ FRANKLIN D. ROOSEVELT

== Awards and decorations ==

1st row	Medal of Honor		
2nd row	Purple Heart	Combat Action Ribbon	Presidential Unit Citation
3rd row	Marine Corps Good Conduct Medal	China Service Medal	American Defense Service Medal with 1 Service star
4th row	American Campaign Medal	Asiatic-Pacific Campaign Medal with 2 Campaign stars	World War II Victory Medal
	Navy Occupation Service Medal with 'Asia' Clasp	National Defense Service Medal with 1 Service star	Armed Forces Reserve Medal

== Other awards and honors ==
Paige received numerous awards both as a member of the military and as a civilian. In addition to being a Medal of Honor recipient, he was also an Eagle Scout and had a G.I. Joe action figure representing him:

In 1998, Paige served as the model for a G.I. Joe action figure. His was the Marine Corps figure in a series honoring Medal of Honor recipients from each branch of the U.S. military.

In 1999, A Golden Palm Star on the Palm Springs Walk of Stars was dedicated to Paige, recognizing him as one of five Medal of Honor recipients from the Southern California desert area.

A museum at the Twentynine Palms Marine Corps base is dedicated to him.

On March 23, 2003, Paige was presented with the Eagle Scout award by the Boy Scouts of America, which he had earned in 1936, his last year in high school, but had never received because he had left home to join the Marine Corps. (He is one of nine known Eagle Scouts who have received the Medal of Honor.) Paige is also a recipient of the Distinguished Eagle Scout Award from the Boy Scouts of America.

On May 2, 2006, the Desert Sands Unified School District honored Paige by naming its newest school the Colonel Mitchell Paige Middle School, in La Quinta, California.

The Eldred World War II Museum in Eldred, Pennsylvania, holds an exhibit dedicated to him, named "Mitchell Paige Hall". Paige donated his Medal of Honor and his collection of military memorabilia to the Eldred facility.
