= Makarska =

City in Split-Dalmatia, Croatia

- Town
- Grad Makarska; Town of Makarska
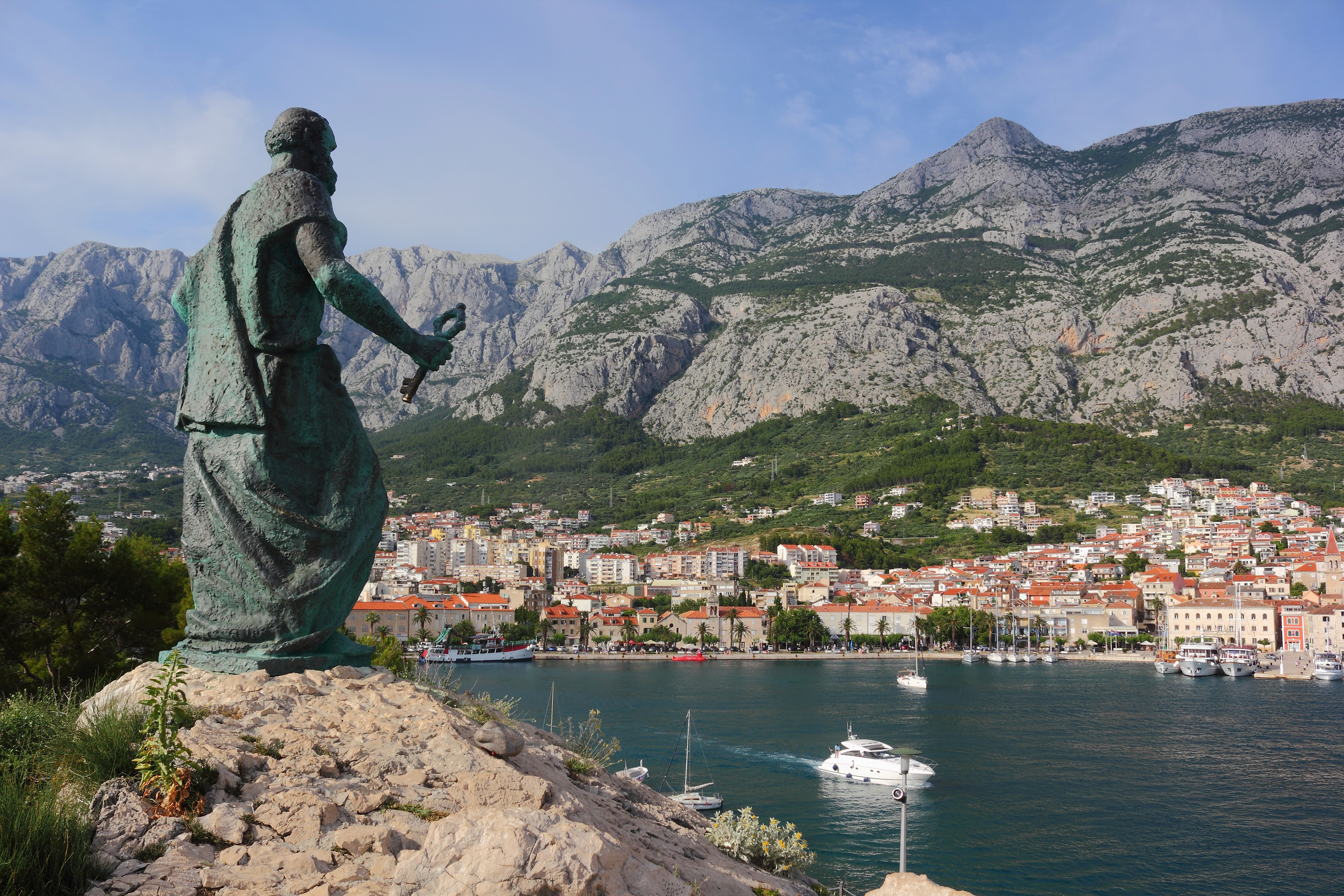
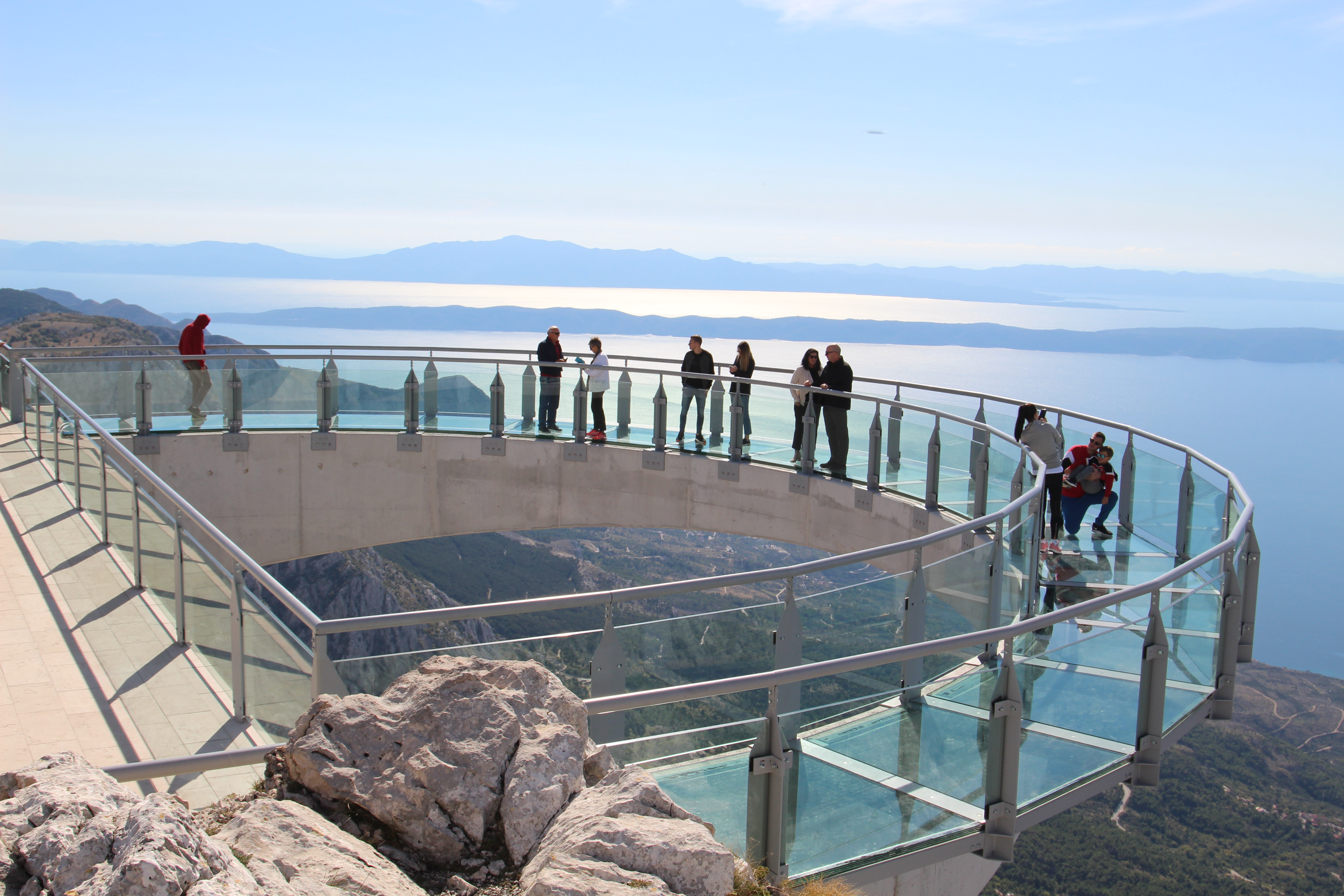
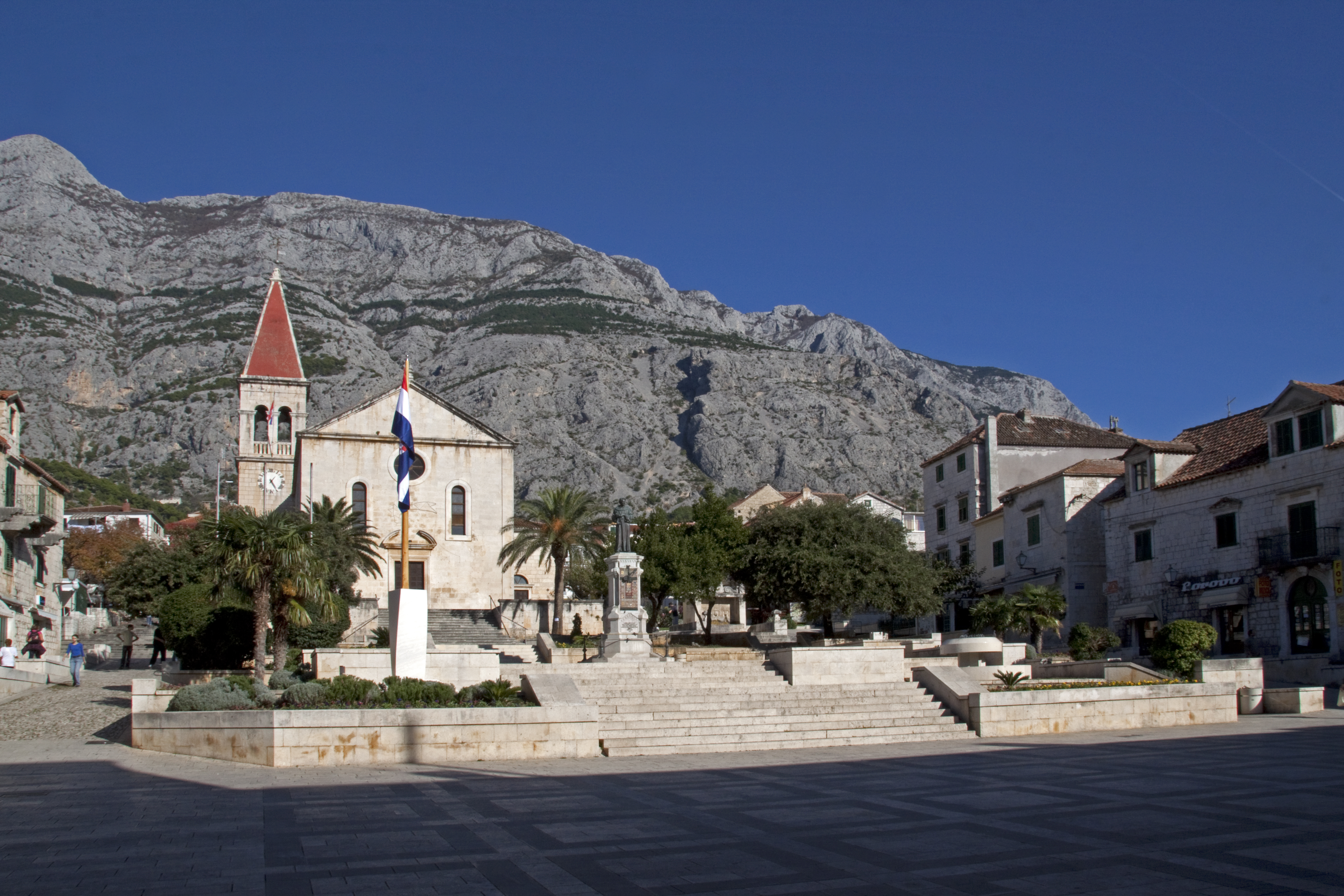
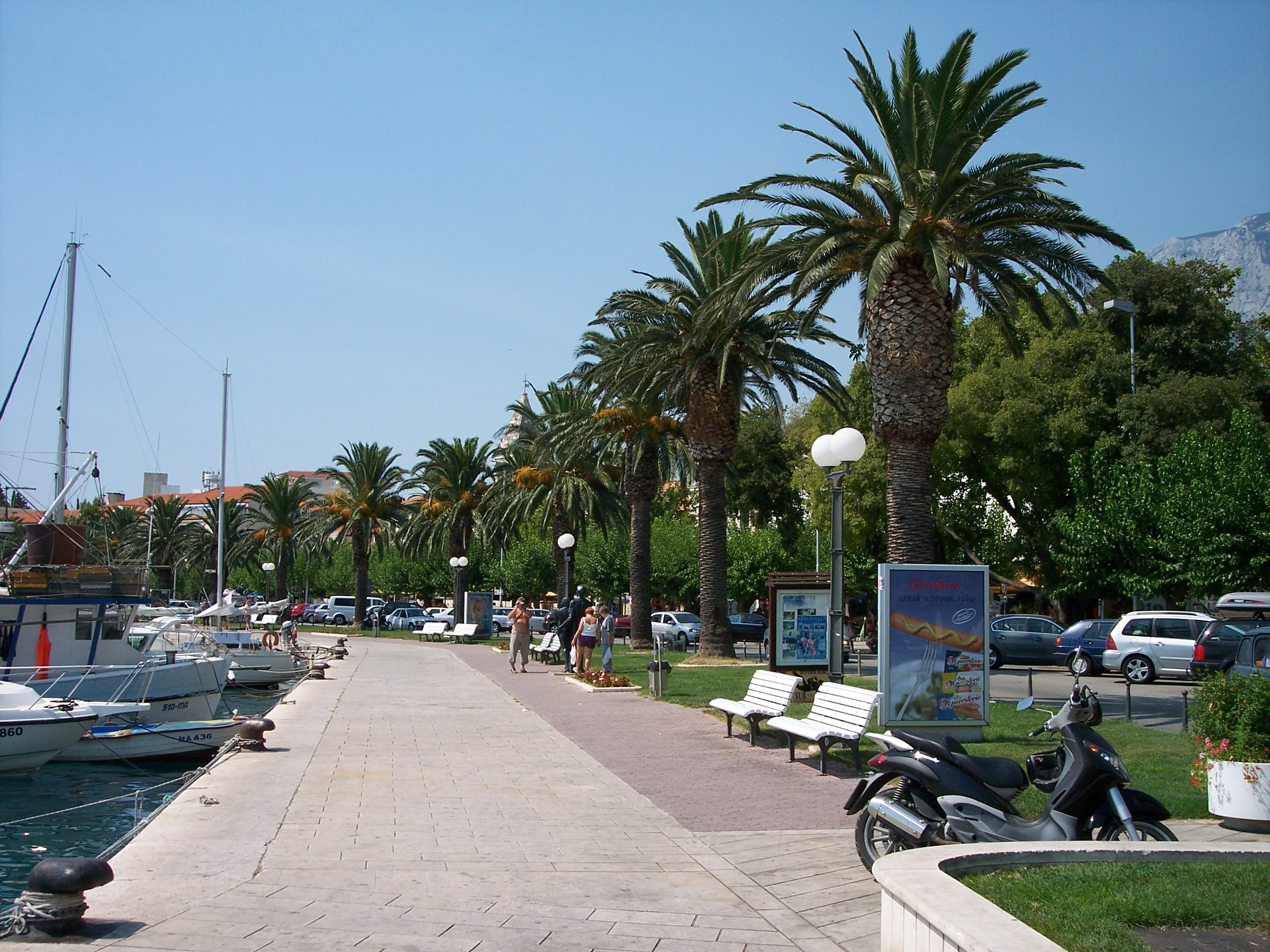
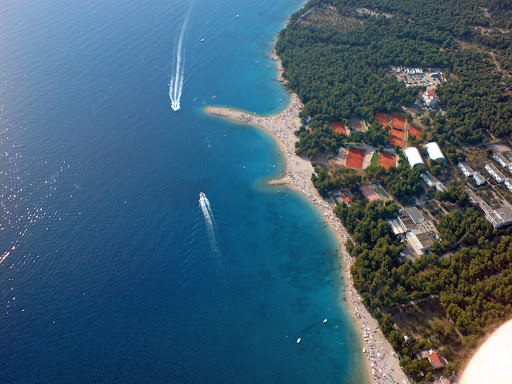
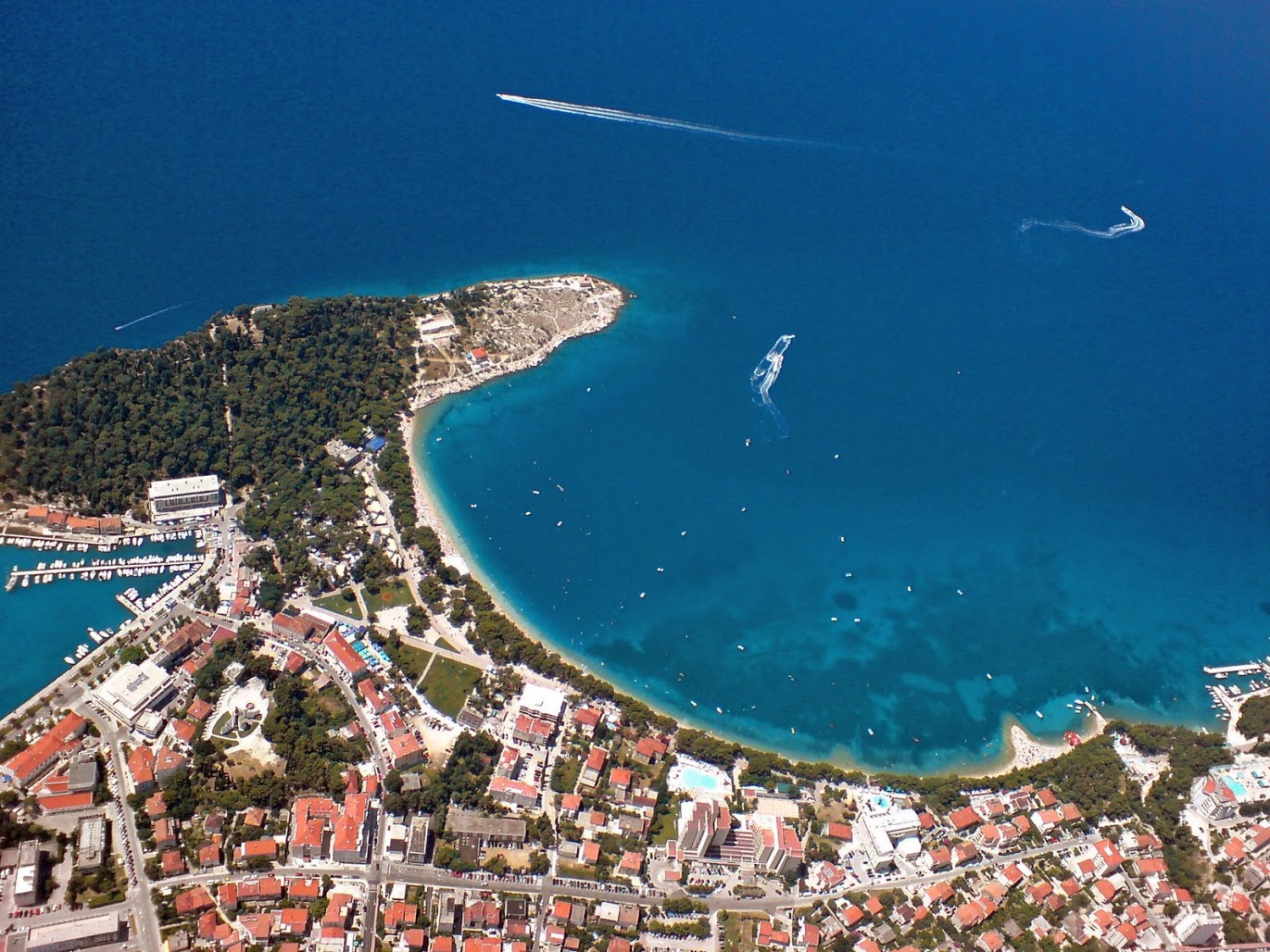
- Clockwise: Makarska harbour, Makarska Cathedral, Biloševac beach, Sveti Petar peninsula, Waterfront and Skywalk on Biokovo

- Flag Coat of arms

- Location of Makarska in Croatia
- Coordinates: 43°18′N 17°02′E
- Country: Croatia
- Region: Dalmatia
- County: Split-Dalmatia County

Government
  - Type: Mayor-Council
  - Mayor: Zoran Paunović (SDP)
  - City Council: 15 members: • SDP (7); • HDZ (5); • NLO (2); • Ind. (1)

Area
  - Town: 37.8 km^{2} (14.6 sq mi)
  - Urban: 26.0 km^{2} (10.0 sq mi)
- Elevation: 0 m (0 ft)

Population (2021)
  - Town: 13,301
  - Density: 352/km^{2} (911/sq mi)
  - Urban: 12,809
  - Urban density: 493/km^{2} (1,280/sq mi)
- Time zone: UTC+1 (CET)
  - Summer (DST): UTC+2 (CEST)
- Postal code: 21 300
- Area code: +385 21
- Vehicle registration: MA
- Website: makarska.hr

Makarska (Croatian pronunciation: [mâkarskaː]) is a town on the Adriatic coastline of Croatia, about 60 km (37 mi) southeast of Split and 140 km (87 mi) northwest of Dubrovnik, in the Split-Dalmatia County.

Makarska is a prominent regional tourist center, located on a horseshoe-shaped bay between the Biokovo mountains and the Adriatic Sea. The city is noted for its palm-fringed promenade, where cafes, bars and boutiques overlook the harbor. Adjacent to the beach are several large capacity hotels as well as a camping grounds.

Makarska is the centre of the Makarska Riviera, a popular tourist destination under the Biokovo mountain. It stretches for 60 km (37 mi) between the municipalities of Brela and Gradac.

== History ==
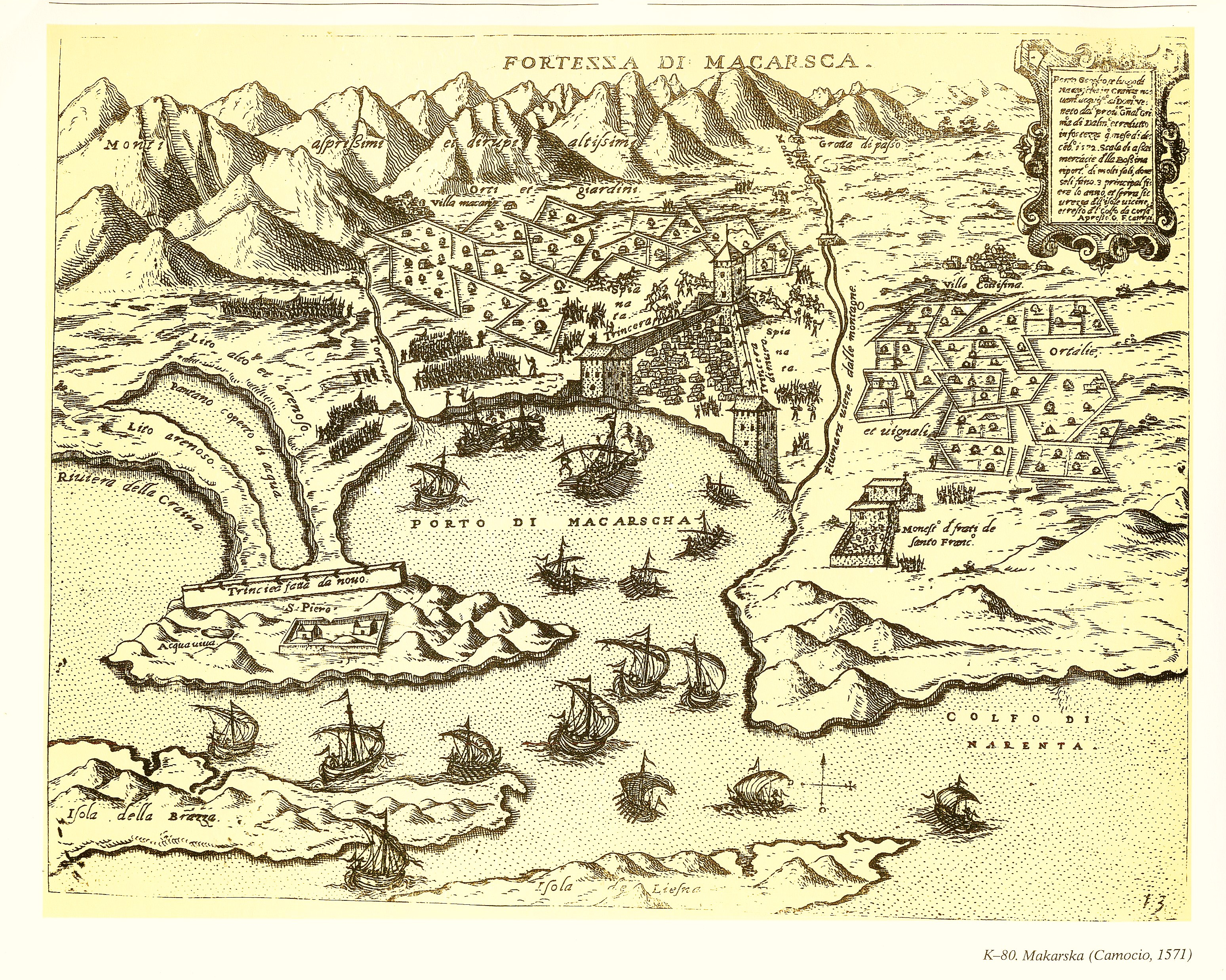
Map depicting the Turks trying to recapture Makarska after the Battle of Lepanto in 1571.

=== Pre-history ===
Near present-day Makarska, there was a settlement as early as the middle of the 2nd millennium BC. It is thought that it was a point used by the Cretans on their way up to the Adriatic (the so-called Amber Road). However it was only one of the ports with links with the wider Mediterranean, as shown by a copper tablet with Cretan and Egyptian systems of measurement.

A similar tablet was found in the Egyptian pyramids. In the Illyrian era this region was part of the broader alliance of tribes, led by the Ardaeans, founded in the third century BC in the Cetina area (Omiš) down to the River Vjosë in present-day Albania.

=== The Roman era ===
Although the Romans became rulers of the Adriatic by defeating the Ardiaei in 228 BC, it took them two centuries to confirm their rule. The Romans sent their veteran soldiers to settle in Makarska. After the division of the Empire in 395 AD, this part of the Adriatic became part of the Eastern Roman Empire and many people fled to Muccurum from the new wave of invaders. The town appears in the Tabula Peutingeriana as the port of Inaronia, but is mentioned as Muccurum, a larger settlement that grew up in the most inaccessible part of Biokovo mountain, probably at the very edge of the Roman civilisation. It appears as Macrum on the acts of the Salonan Synod of 4 May 533 AD held in Salona (533), when also the town's diocese was created.

=== Early Middle Ages ===
During the Migration Period, in 548, Muccurum was destroyed by the army of the Ostrogoth king Totila. The byzantine Emperor expelled the Eastern Goths (Ostrogoths).

In the 7th century the region between the Cetina and Neretva was occupied by the Narentines, with Mokro, located in today's Makarska, as its administrative centre. The doge of Venice Pietro I Candiano, whose Venetian fleet aimed to punish the piratesque activities of the town's vessels, was defeated here on September 18, 877 and had to pay tribute to the Narentines for the free passage of its ships on the Adriatic.

=== Late Middle Ages ===
The principality was annexed to the Kingdom of Croatia in the 12th century, and was conquered by the Republic of Venice a century later. Making use of the rivalry between the Croatian leaders and their power struggles (1324–1326), the Bosnian Ban Stjepan II Kotromanić annexed the Makarska coastal area. There were many changes of rulers here: from the Croatian and Bosnian feudal lords, to those from Zahumlje (later Herzegovina).

In the eventful 15th century the Ottomans conquered the Balkans. In order to protect his territory from the Turks, Duke Stjepan Vukčić Kosača handed the region to the Venetians in 1452. The Makarska coastal area fell to the Turks in 1499.

=== Under the Turks ===
Under Ottoman rule, the town was surrounded with walls that had three towers. The name Makarska was cited for the first time in a 1502 document telling how nuns from Makarska were permitted to repair their church. The Turks had links with all parts of the Adriatic via Makarska and they therefore paid a great deal of attention to the port's maintenance. In 1568 they built a fortress as defence against the Venetians. During Turkish rule the seat of the administrative and judicial authority was in Foča, Mostar, for a short time in Makarska itself and finally in Gabela on the River Neretva.

During the Cretan War between Venice and the Turks (1645–1669), the desire among the people of the area to be free of the Turks intensified. In 1646, Venice recaptured the coastline. A period of dual leadership, marked with armed conflicts, destruction, and reprisals, lasted until 1684, until the danger of the Turks ended in 1699.

=== Once more under the Venetians ===
In 1695 Makarska became the seat of a bishopric and commercial activity came to life, but it was a neglected area and little attention was given to the education of its inhabitants. At the time when the people were fighting against the Turks, and Venice paid more attention to the people's demands. According to Alberto Fortis in his travel chronicles (18th century), Makarska was the only town in the coastal area, and the only Dalmatian town where there were absolutely no historical remains.

After the fall of the Venetian Republic, it was given to the Austrians by the Treaty of Campo Formio (1797).

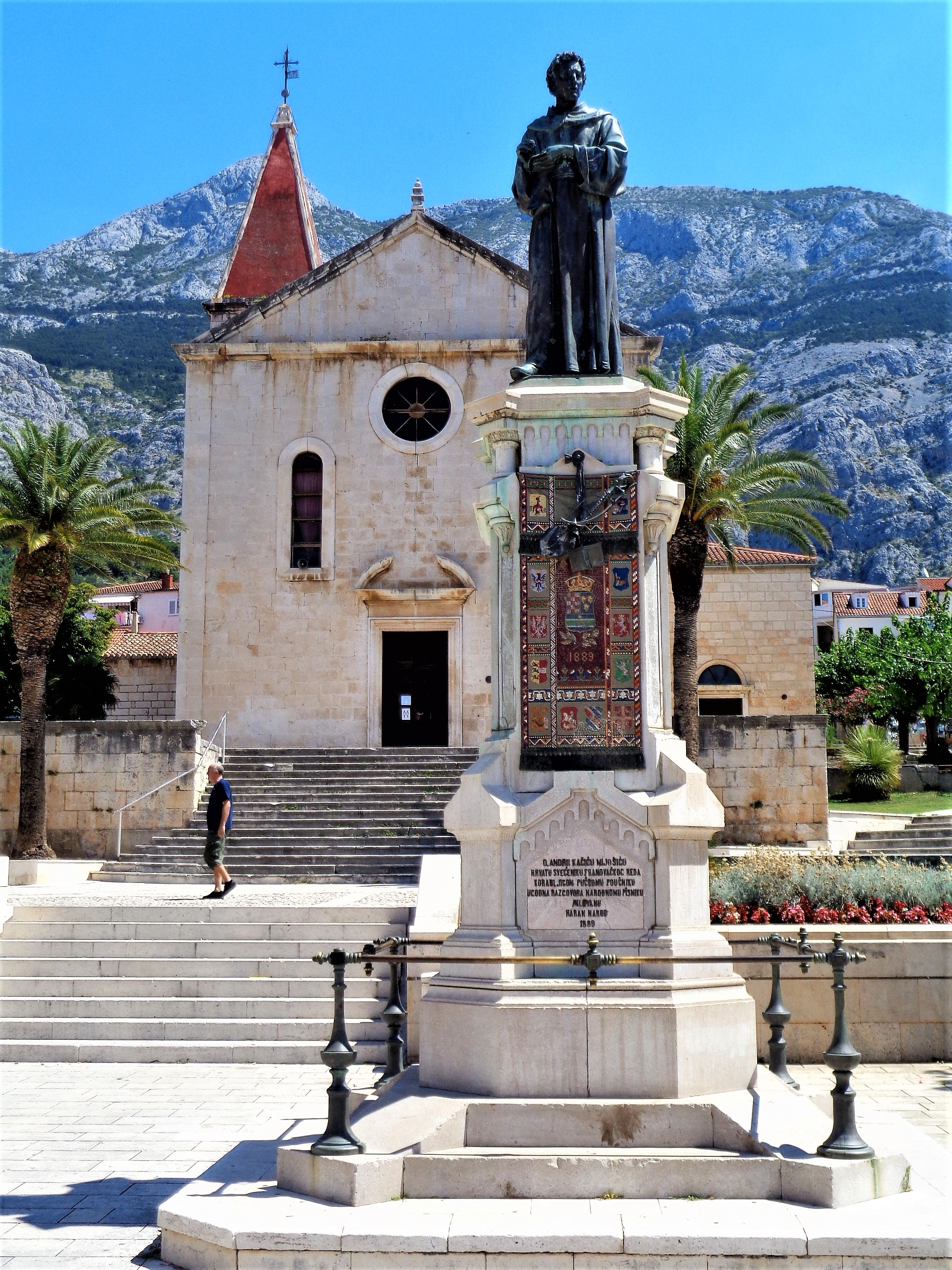
Statue of friar and poet Andrija Kačić Miošić with St Mark's Co-cathedral in the background

=== From 1797 to 1813 ===
With the fall of Venice, the Austrian army entered Makarska and remained there until Napoleon took the upper hand. The French arrived in Makarska on 8 March 1806 and remained until 1813. This was an age of prosperity, cultural, social and economic development. Under French rule all the people were equal, and education laws written, for the first time in many centuries, in Croatian were passed. Schools were opened. Makarska was at this time a small town with about 1580 inhabitants.

=== Under the Austrians (1813–1918) ===
As in Dalmatia as a whole, the Austrian authorities imposed a policy of Italianization, and the official language was Italian. The Makarska representatives in the Dalmatian assembly in Zadar and the Imperial Council in Vienna demanded the introduction of Croatian for use in public life, but the authorities steadfastly opposed the idea. One of the leaders of the National (pro-Croatian) Party was Mihovil Pavlinović of Podgora. Makarska was one of the first communities to introduce Croatian (1865).

In the second half of the 19th century Makarska experienced a great boom and in 1900 it had about 1800 inhabitants. It became a trading point for agricultural products, not only from the coastal area, but also from the hinterland (Bosnia and Herzegovina) and had shipping links with Trieste, Rijeka and Split.

The Congress of Vienna assigned Makarska to Austria-Hungary, under which it remained until 1918.

=== 20th century ===
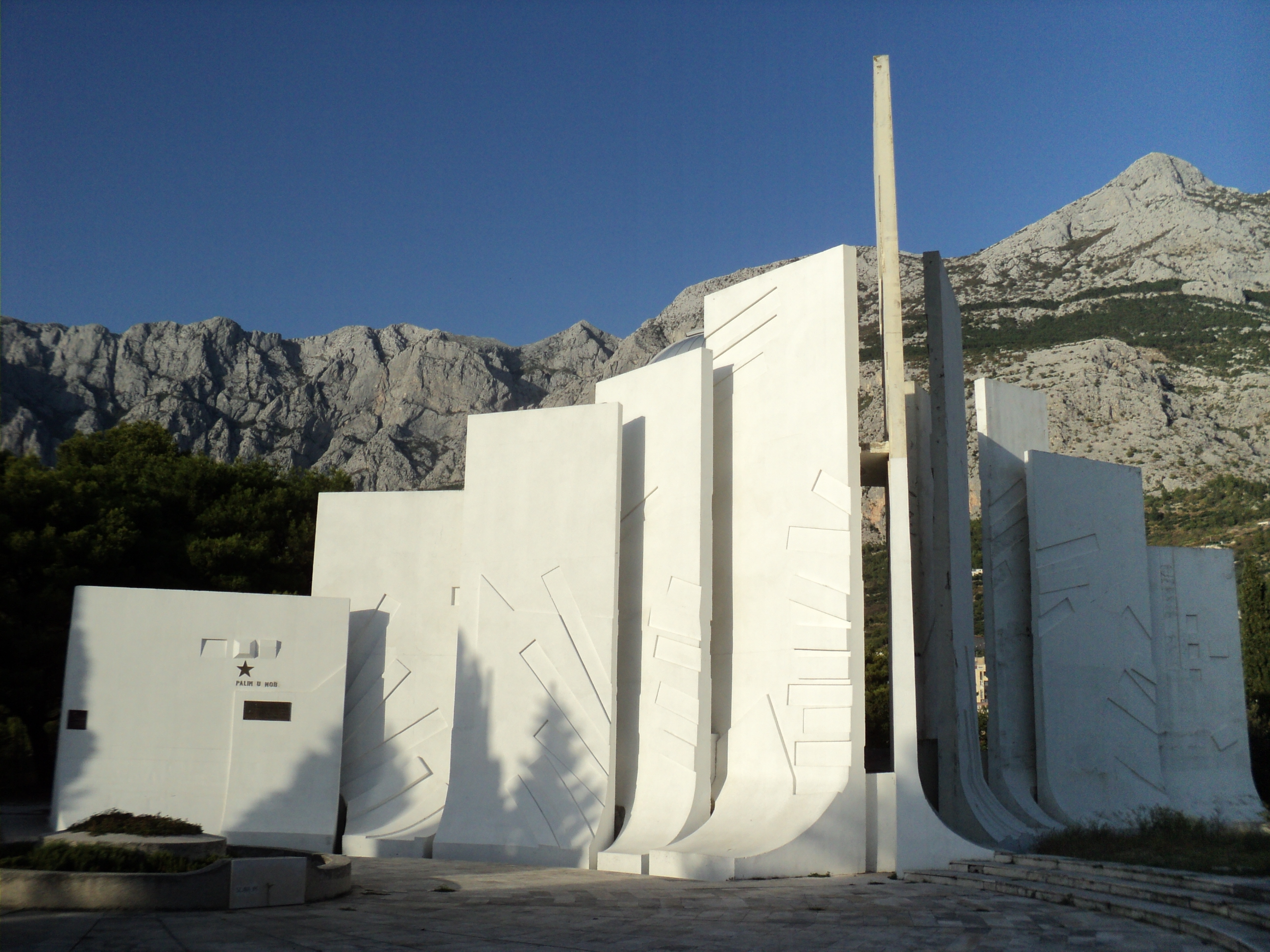
Monument to the Revolution

In the early 20th century agriculture, trade and fishing remained the mainstay of economy. In 1914, the first hotel was built, beginning the tourism tradition in the area. During World War II, Makarska was part of the Independent State of Croatia. It was a port for the nation's navy and served as the headquarters of the Central Adriatic Naval Command, until it was moved to Split.

After the war, during the socialist Yugoslavia, Makarska experienced a period of growth, and the population tripled. All the natural advantages of the region were used to create in Makarska one of the best known tourist areas on the Croatian Adriatic.

=== 21st century ===
Following Croatian independence in 1991, Makarska had a sustained growth in first few years with many of the refugees (mostly from Herzegovina) being accommodated in tourist accommodation. In the late 1990s tourism was thriving again and in following decades created a speculative, rapid and wild construction boom with lot of highly problematic expansions (especially in Veliko Brdo), while with little or no urban planning at all. Local and regional experts have been active in drawing attention to the problems caused by the lack of planning and in this have recently been joined by members of the local population and citizens along with urban and environmental activists. Increasing attention has been given to the protection of the surrounding natural environment, particularly the Biokovo Nature Park, which represents a significant ecological and geographical feature of the area.

== Geography ==
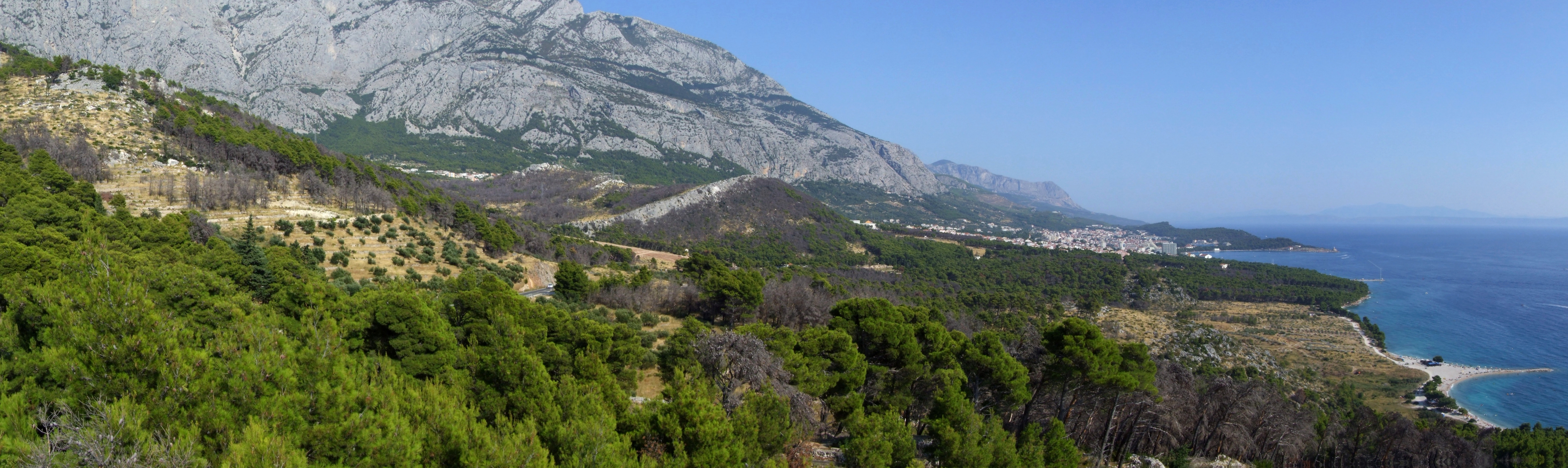
View from the mountain

Makarska is located in central Dalmatia, at the junction of Biokovo and the Adriatic Sea.

The town is sharply separated from the interior by the mountain Biokovo (the highest peak of St. George, 1762 m), and it is connected with the central Dalmatian islands of Brač and Hvar by the Adriatic Sea, which modelled some of the most beautiful Croatian beaches in the Makarska Riviera.

The town itself is located in a natural harbour between two peninsulas, Osejava and Sv. Petra. The flysch zone between the mountain and the sea is only a few kilometres wide, so that the further expansion of the city goes to the east and west, i.e. to the neighbouring settlements of Tučepi and Krvavica.

== Main sights ==
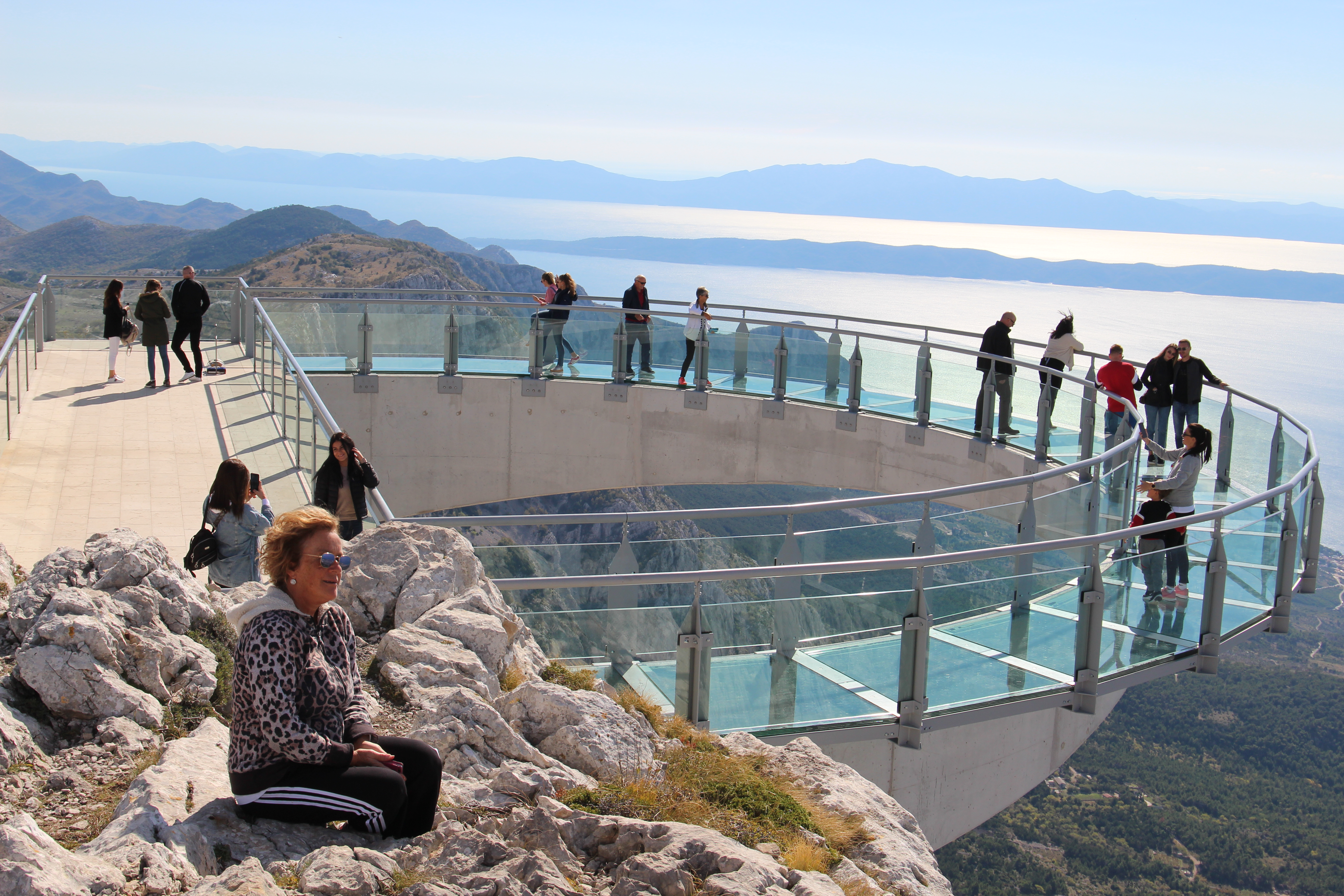
Biokovo Skywalk

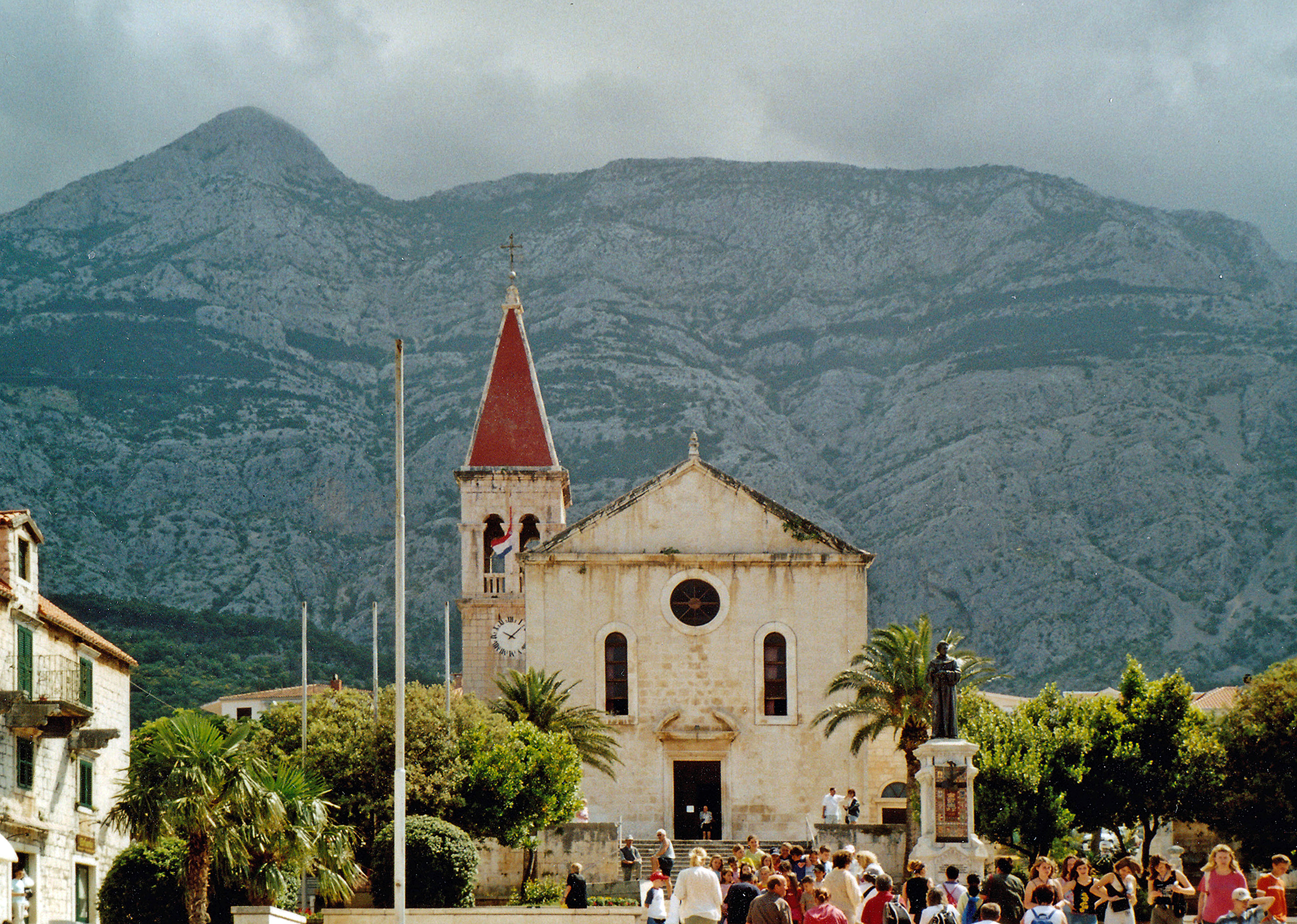
St. Mark’s Cathedral

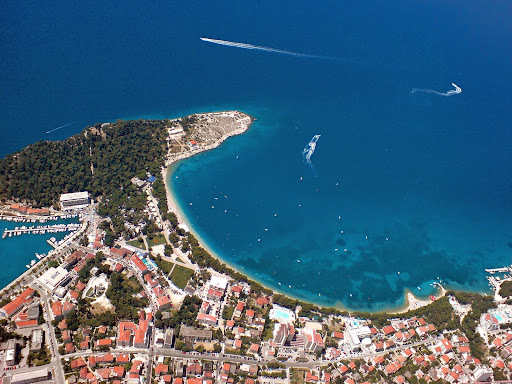
Sv. Petar peninsula

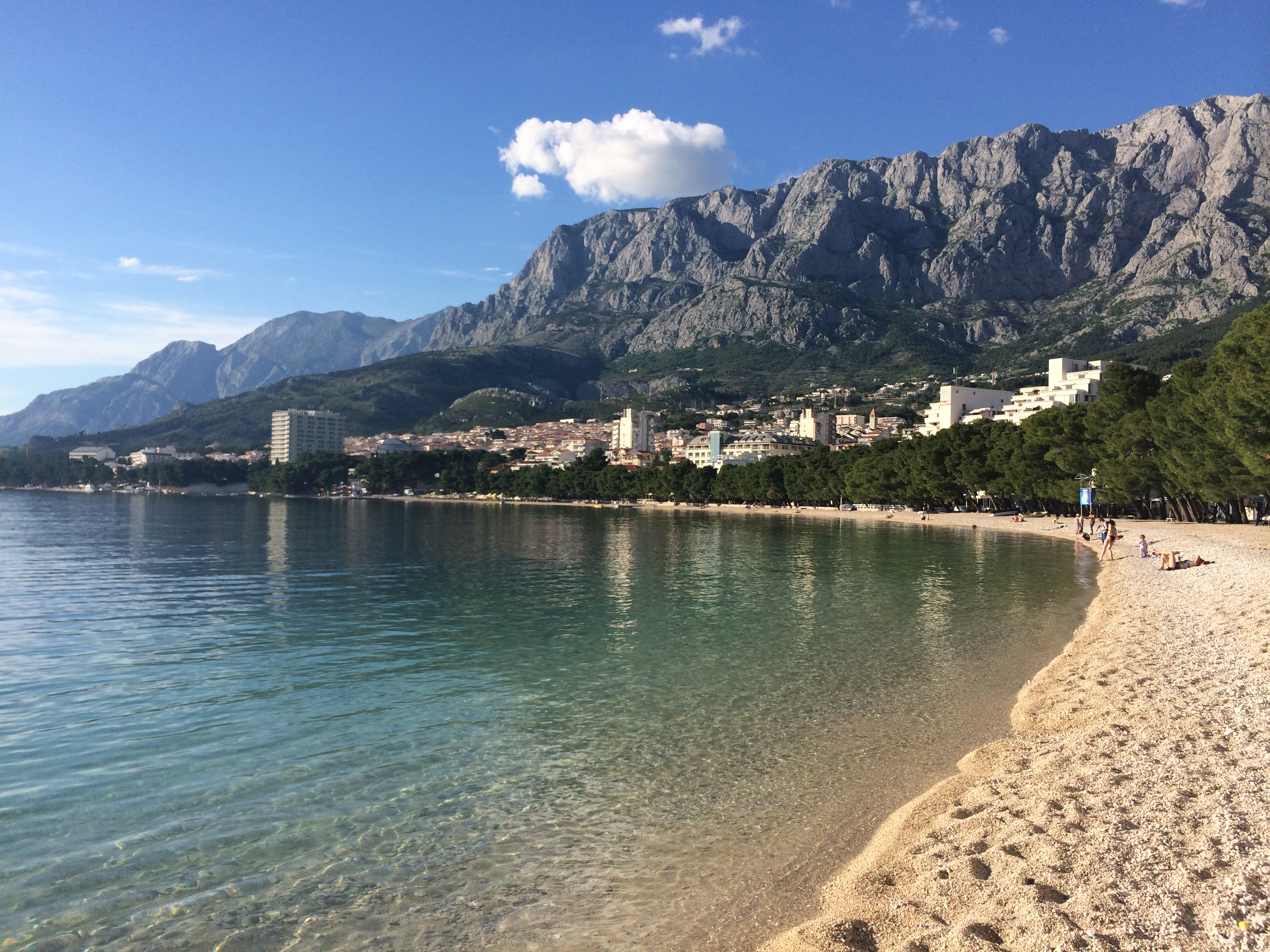
Makarska Riviera

- St. Mark's Cathedral (17th century), in the Main Square.
- Statue of the friar Andrija Kačić Miošić by the famous Croatian sculptor Ivan Rendić.
- St. Philip's Church (18th century).
- St. Peter's church (13th century), situated on the Sv. Petar peninsula, rebuilt in 1993.
- The Franciscan monastery (16th century). It houses a library with numerous books and rare incunabulas and a famous, world known collection of shells from all over the world, collected in a Malacological Museum from 1963.
- Napoleon monument, erected in the honour of the French Marshal Marmont in 1808.
- The Baroque Ivanišević Palace.
- Villa Tonolli, which is home to the Town Museum.

== Government and politics ==
The mayor of Makarska is Zoran Paunović (SDP). He was confirmed as mayor on 30 May 2021 winning 59.85% of the vote (2021 Croatian local elections, second round). The deputy mayor (vice mayor) is Antonia Radić Brkan (Ind.).

The City Council is composed of 15 representatives. The last elections were held on 16 May 2017 (2021 Croatian local elections). The two largest parties in the city assembly are SDP with 7 members and HDZ with 5 members.

== Climate and vegetation ==
Makarska experiences a hot-summer Mediterranean climate (Köppen climate classification: Csa). Winters are warm and wet, while summers are hot and dry. In summer, daytime temperatures are around 30 °C, often around 35 °C, and nighttime temperatures are around 25 °C. Winter temperatures are mostly from 10 to 15 during the day, and from 6 to 10 °C at night. Makarska is one of the warmest towns in Croatia.

Since records began in 1981, the highest temperature recorded at the local weather station at an elevation of 50 metres (160 ft) was 39.7 °C (103.5 °F), on 9 August 2017. The coldest temperature was −5.5 °C (22.1 °F), on 7 January 2017.

Vegetation is the evergreen Mediterranean type, and subtropical flora (palm-trees, agaves, cacti) grow in the town and its surroundings.

== Economy ==
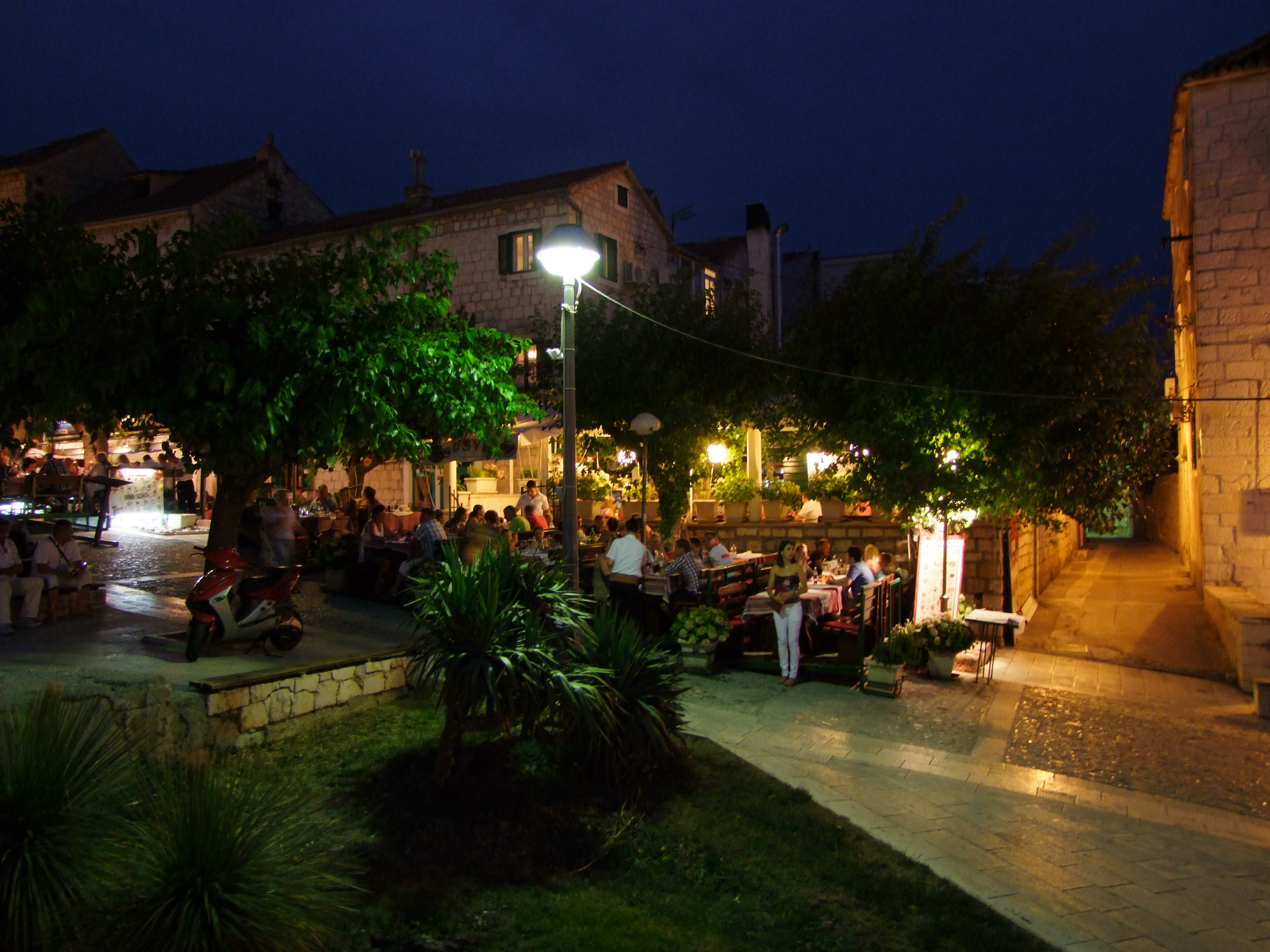
Main square at night

The main economic activity of Makarska, as well as the whole region, is tourism. Tourists have at their disposal a large number of beds in the hotel and private accommodation. The strong reliance on international visitors has influenced the development of payment and service infrastructure, with emphasis on diverse payment preferences. In 2022 the city introduced the possibility of cryptocurrency payments for certain municipal services, in cooperation with Electrocoin, becoming one of the early adopters of such practices among Croatian tourist cities.

== Sports ==
The local chapter of the HPS is HPD "Biokovo", which had 51 members in 1936 under the Dragan Koukal presidency. At the time, it had a dedicated mountain guide section. Membership rose to 72 in 1937, and Tomo Jurišić was elected its president. Membership rose to 73 in 1938 under the Ivan Lovrić presidency.

== Education ==
There are 3 primary schools and 3 secondary schools.

== Demographics ==
Historical population
Year	Pop.	±%
1857	2,175	—
1869	2,331	+7.2%
1880	2,448	+5.0%
1890	2,690	+9.9%
1900	2,841	+5.6%
1910	3,138	+10.5%
1921	3,138	+0.0%
1931	3,272	+4.3%
1948	3,242	−0.9%
1953	3,497	+7.9%
1961	4,550	+30.1%
1971	7,121	+56.5%
1981	9,556	+34.2%
1991	11,958	+25.1%
2001	13,716	+14.7%
2011	13,834	+0.9%
2021	13,301	−3.9%
Source: Naselja i stanovništvo Republike Hrvatske 1857–2021, DZS

According to the 2011 census, the total population of the town is 13,834, in the following settlements:

- Makarska, population: 13,426
- Veliko Brdo, population: 408

A 2019 study found that high school students in Makarska were the tallest in the Dinaric Alps (and the world), with males having an average height of 187.6 cm.

Town of Makarska: Population trends 1857–2021
v

population	2175	2331	2448	2690	2841	3138	3138	3272	3242	3497	4550	7121	9556	11958	13716	13834	13301
	1857	1869	1880	1890	1900	1910	1921	1931	1948	1953	1961	1971	1981	1991	2001	2011	2021

Sources: Croatian Bureau of Statistics publications

== Notable natives/residents ==
- Giuseppe Addobbati (1909–1986) - Italian film actor
- Jure Bilić (1922–2006) - Yugoslav and Croatian politician
- Alen Bokšić (1970–) - Croatian retired football player
- Ivan Božić (1915–1977) - Yugoslav historian
- Stipe Drviš (1973–) - Croatian boxer
- Garry Kasparov (1963–) - Soviet and Russian chess grandmaster; naturalised Croatian citizen
- Andrija Kačić Miošić (1704–1760) - Croatian poet and monk

== Gallery ==
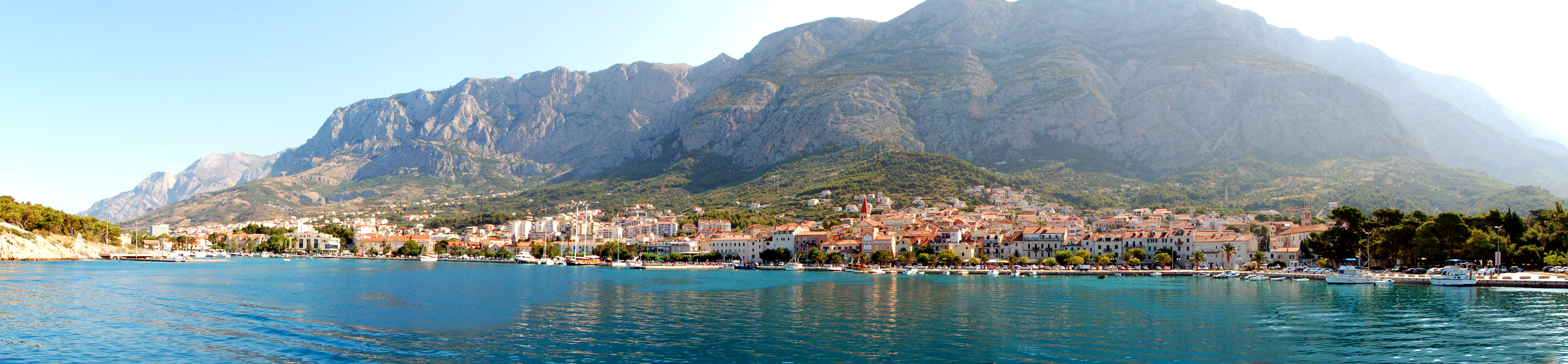
Panoramic view of Makarska and Biokovo mountain

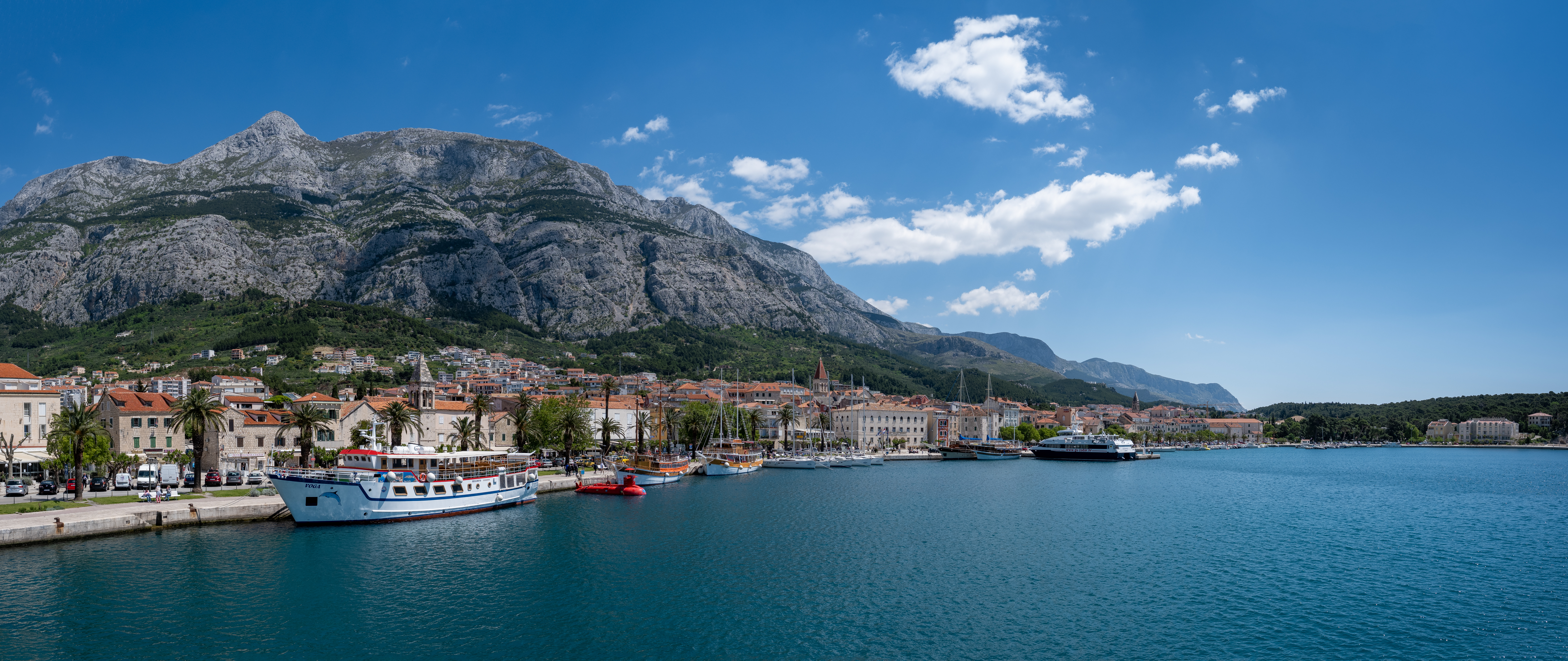
Panorama of Makarska's harbor

== Twin towns/cities ==
Makarska is twinned with:

- Đakovo, Croatia
- Stari Grad, Croatia
- Vukovar, Croatia
- Kavadarci, North Macedonia
- Budva, Montenegro
- Sarajevo, Bosnia and Herzegovina
- Travnik, Bosnia and Herzegovina
- Maribor, Slovenia
- Znojmo, Czech Republic
- Nocera Inferiore, Italy

Friendly relationships:

- Vinkovci, Croatia
- Roseto degli Abruzzi, Italy
- Stein, Germany
- Neumarkt in der Oberpfalz, Germany
- Bugojno, Bosnia and Herzegovina
- Olomouc, Czech Republic

== Gallery ==
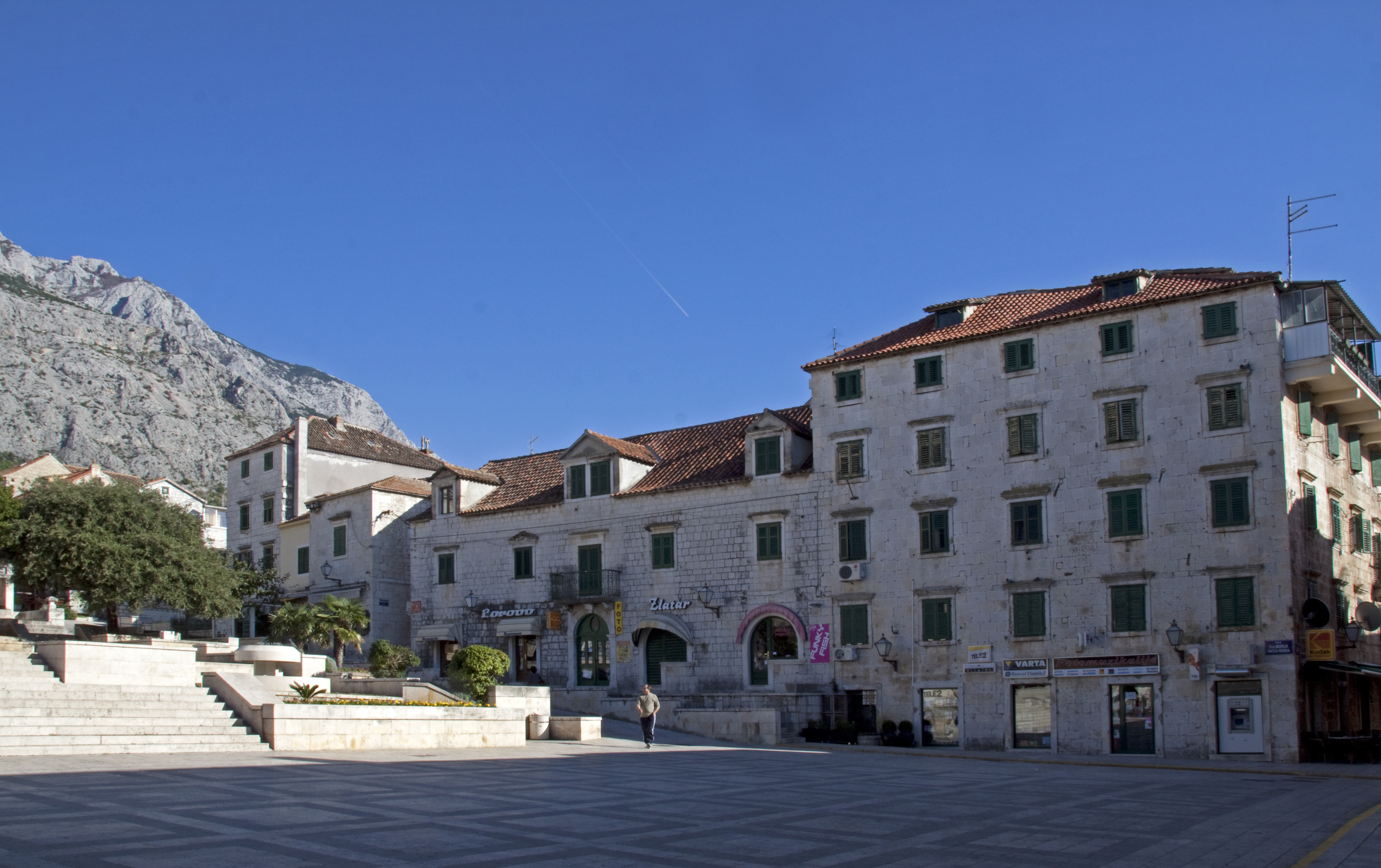
Makarska town center

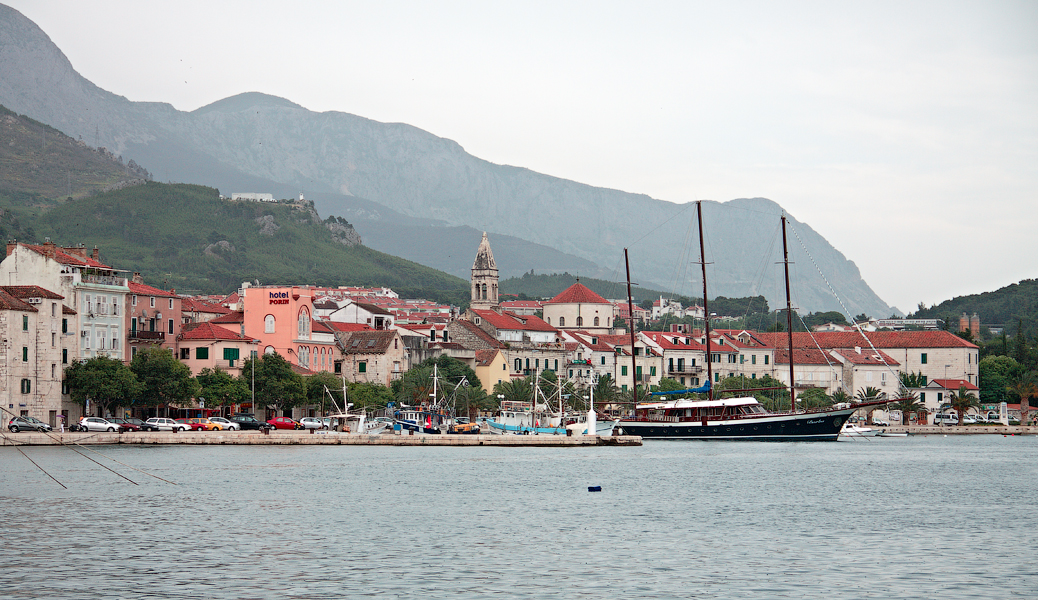
Makarska harbor

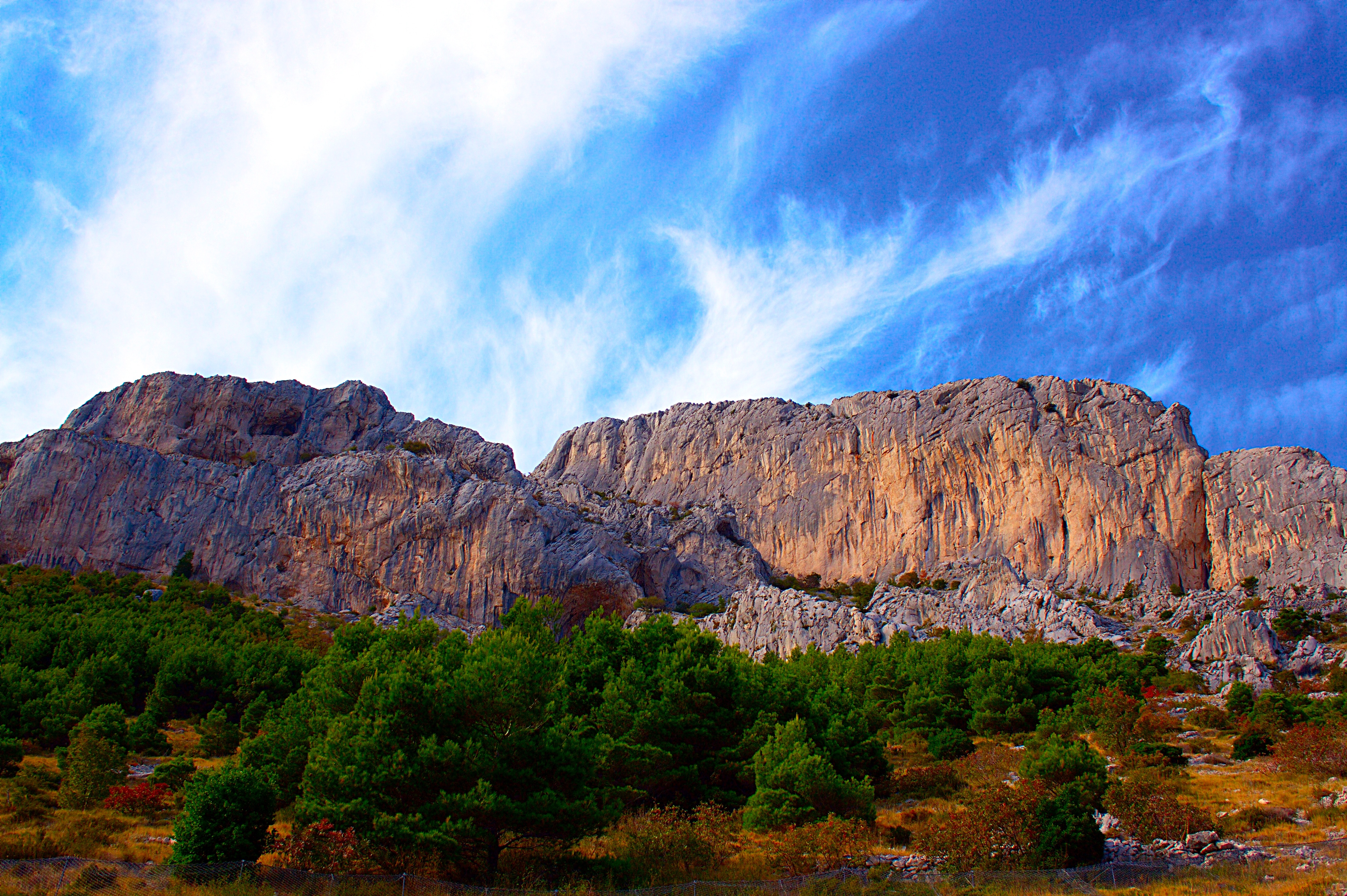
Karst cliffs

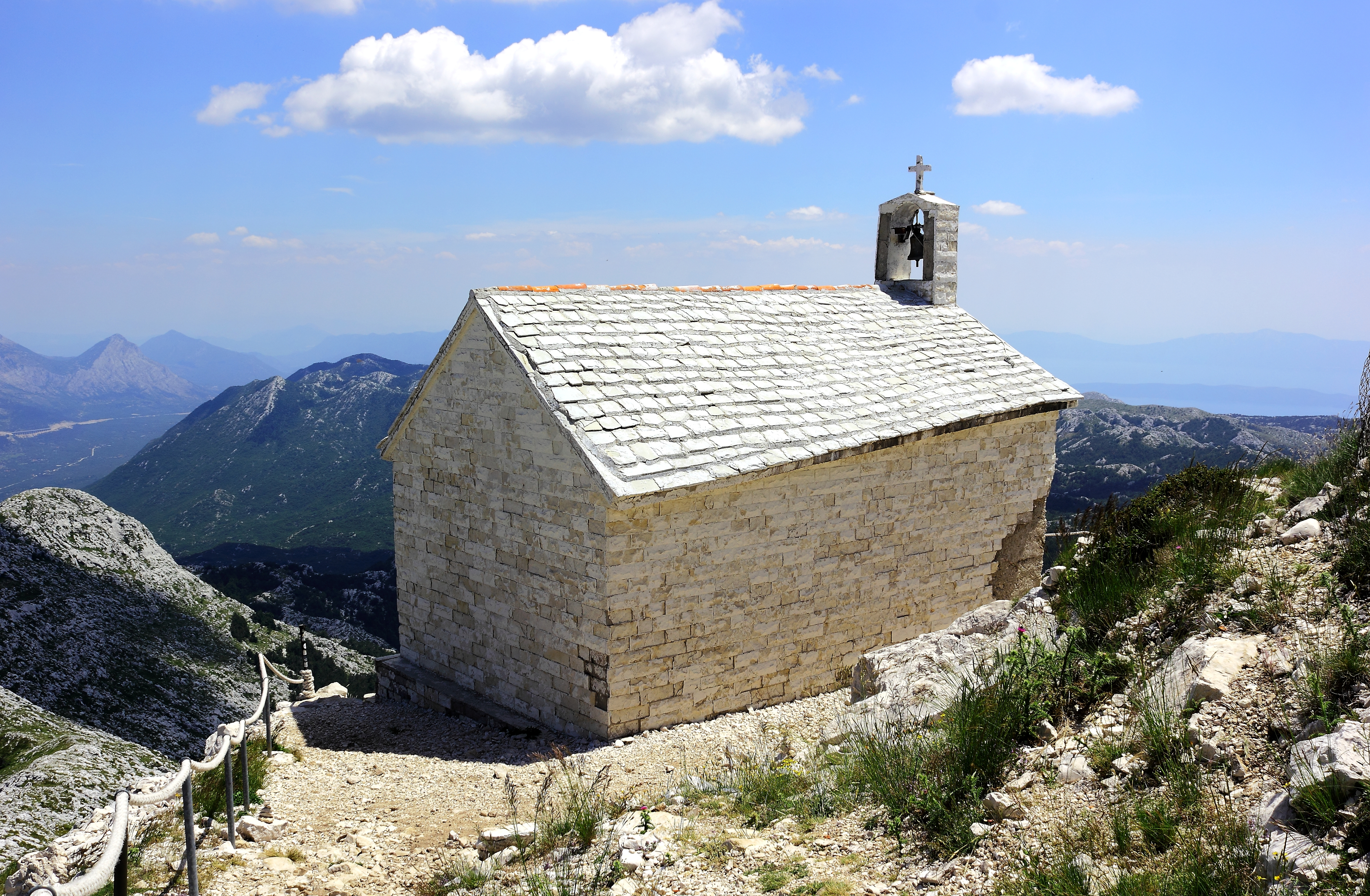
Chapel on Biokovo

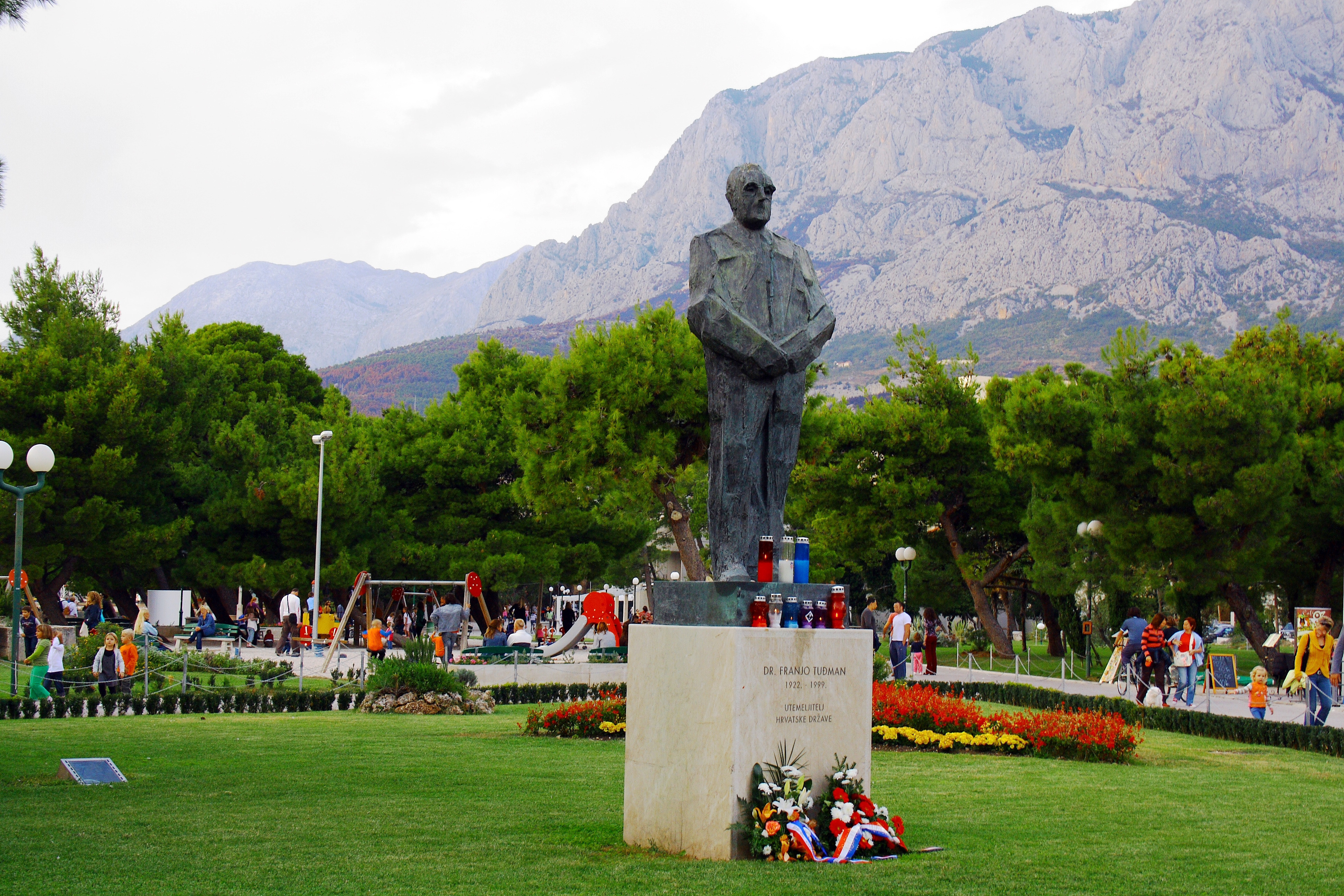
Franjo Tuđman monument

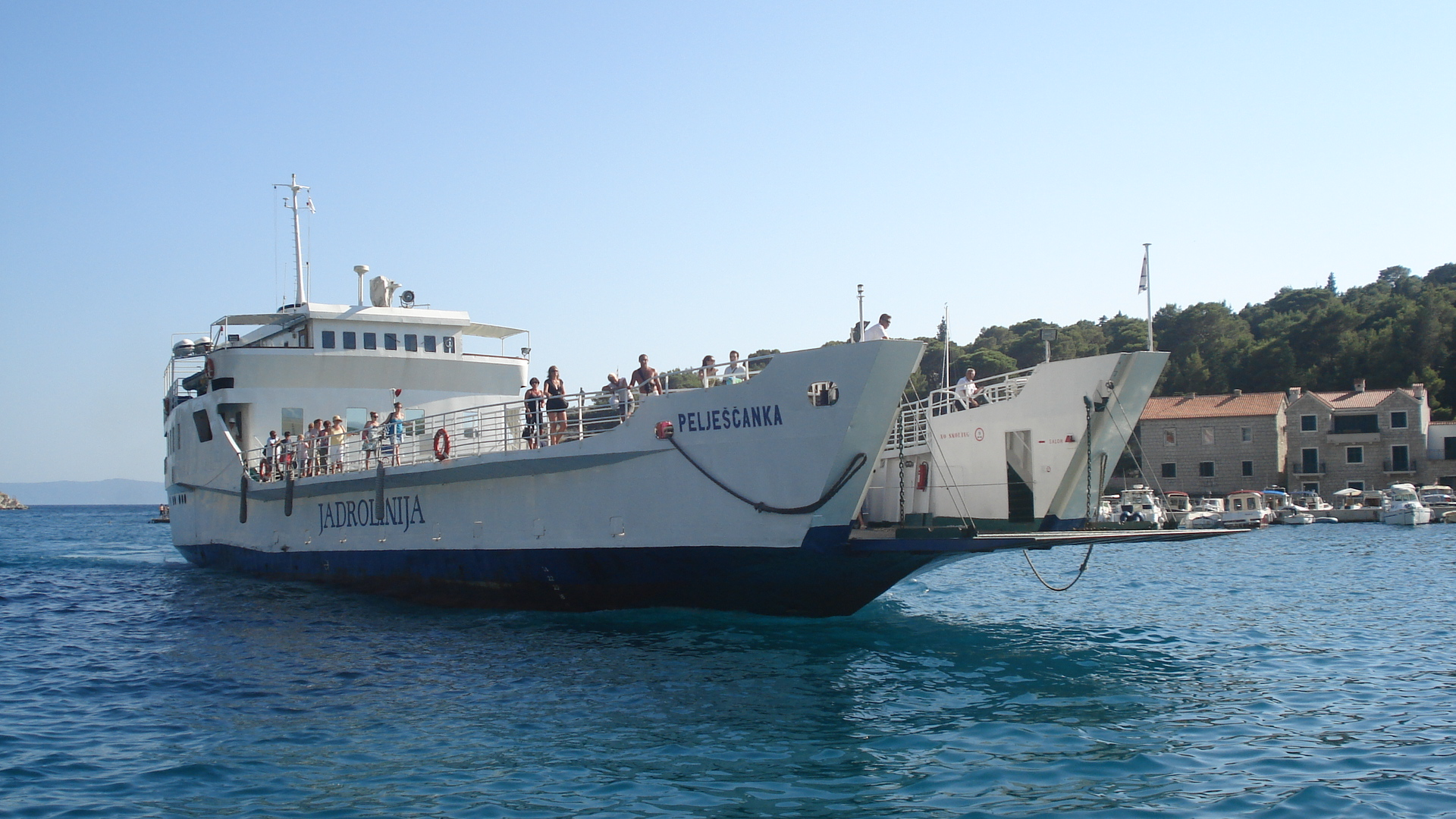
Pelješčanka ferry

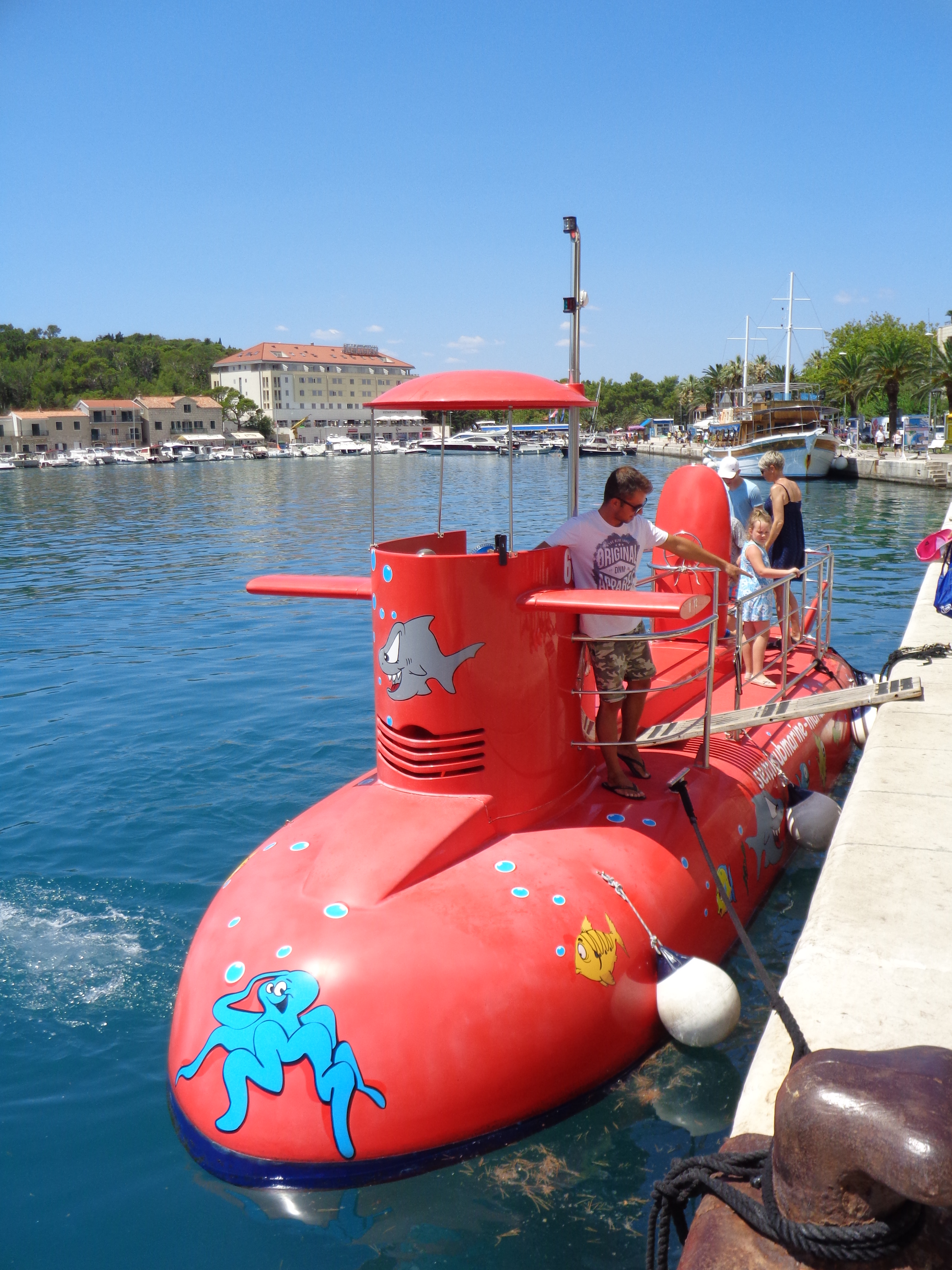
Red semi-submarine in Makarska harbour

== See also ==
- Makarska massacre
- Croatia
- Dalmatia

== Sources and external links ==
- "Macarsca" . Encyclopædia Britannica (11th ed.). 1911.
- GCatholic - former cathedral
- Foster, Jane (3 June 2014). "Makarska, Croatia: Secret Seaside". The Telegraph.
