= Makarska Cathedral =

Church in Makarska, Croatia

Coordinates: 45.8981°N 16.8433°E

Cathedral of St. Mark the Evangelist Katedrala sv. Marka evanđelista
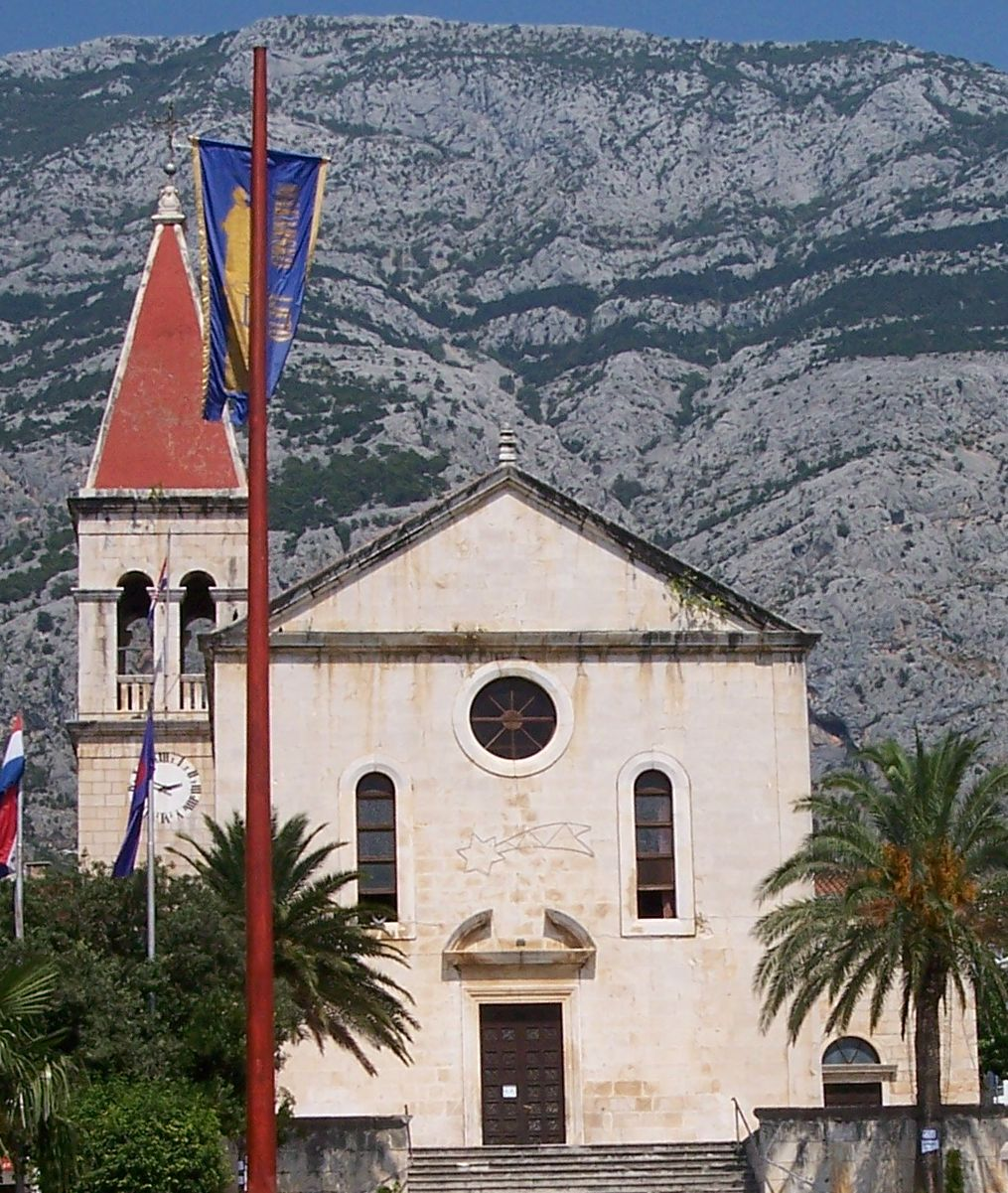
- Makarska Cathedral

Religion
- Affiliation: Roman Catholic
- Diocese: Archdiocese of Split-Makarska
- Rite: Roman
- Ecclesiastical or organizational status: Co-cathedral

Location
- Location: Makarska, Croatia
- Interactive map of Cathedral of St. Mark the Evangelist; Katedrala sv. Marka evanđelista

Architecture
- Type: Church
- Style: Baroque
- Groundbreaking: 1700
- Completed: 1756

Cathedral of St. Mark the Evangelist (Croatian: Katedrala sv. Marka evanđelista) is a Baroque church located in the center of the town of Makarska, on Andrija Kačić Miošić Square. It serves as the co-cathedral of the Archdiocese of Split-Makarska and was the episcopal seat of the former Diocese of Makarska.

The cathedral was built in the Baroque style in 1700 as the cathedral of the then diocese of Makarska at the initiative of the Bishop of Makarska, Nikola Bijanković, but was never completely finished. In 1756, the cathedral was consecrated by a later Bishop of Makarska, Stjepan Blašković. In 1828 Makarska diocese became part of the united Archdiocese of Split-Makarska, with the diocesan cathedral based in Split.

The façade, facing southwest, is decorated with two simple mullioned windows and a smaller Gothic-style oculus. On the right side from the entrance to the cathedral is the altar, which houses the bones of the patron saint of the city of Makarska St. Clement. The bones were brought to the cathedral from the Roman catacombs in 1725. On the left side from the entrance to the cathedral is the altar dedicated to Virgin Mary, and over it a small altar dedicated to Our Lady of the Rosary, decorated with the painting on wood of a Virgin and Child, painted by a master from the Byzantine school. The small altar, according to its locals, was built during the plague that hit Makarska in 1815. The second altar on the left is the altar of St. Cross. It is dedicated to the Calvary, and is decorated with the life-size wooden statues.

Inside of the cathedral

The Cathedral was badly damaged during the large earthquake that hit Makarska in 1962. The renovation of the cathedral's interior changed its original appearance. The main altar, work of Venetian masters, was moved to the province Chapel of the Blessed Sacrament. Earthquake also damaged the choir. New organs, work of the Slovenian company Jenko, were installed in 1970.
