= Eldred World War II Museum =

Coordinates: 41.9585°N 78.3861°W

The Eldred World War II Museum is located in Eldred, Pennsylvania, 80 miles south of Buffalo, New York and 175 miles north east of Pittsburgh, Pennsylvania. Established in May 1996, the museum has continually expanded from one room to three stories. The Eldred World War II Museum is a non-profit organization that offers visitors an array of exhibits and information about World War II.

== Exhibits ==
The Eldred World War II Museum is home to several permanent displays. Mitchell Paige Hall, named after Medal of Honor Recipient USMC Col. Mitchell Paige, features many of Paige's war souvenirs and personal items including Paige's dress whites and Medal of Honor.

The European and Pacific theaters are highlighted in multiple displays throughout the museum.

Highlights are a submarine display with an authentic World War II periscope, and the 'Tank Room', housing several uniforms changing based on the theme of each season.

Visitors can enter a life-sized European command post equipped with period communications equipment. Throughout the museum dioramas bring the conflict to life for visitors. A section on the Eastern Front details the conflict between Russia and Germany that would become the largest front of the war.

Thousands of other items are on display, constantly being rotated. These include weaponry, uniforms, field gear and video.

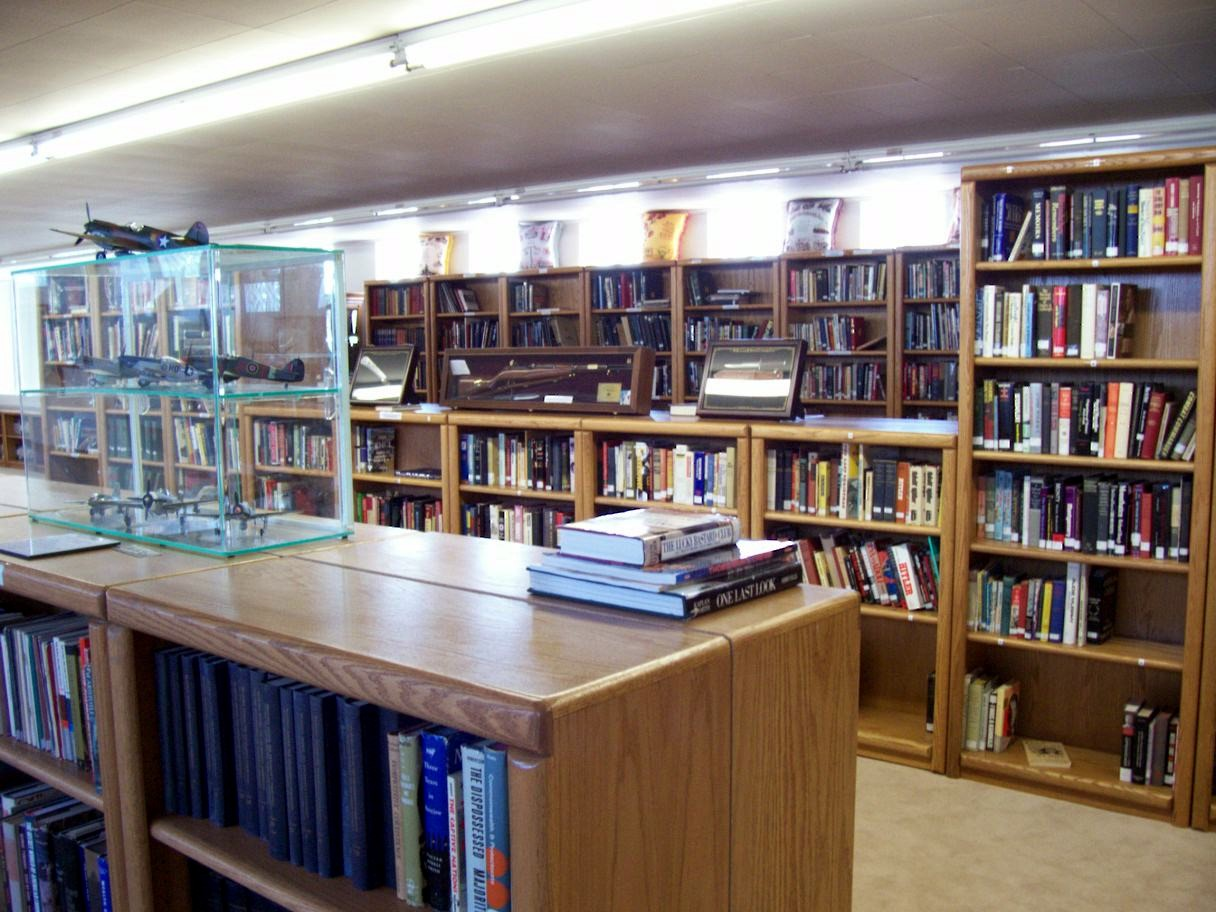
Library

== Library ==
The Eldred World War II museum is home to over 10,000 volumes of books, magazines, newspapers, memoirs and other items, one of the largest World War II collections in the United States. Visitors are welcomed to these resources, so long as all books are returned to the museum. The library is broken into categories, some of which are "European Theater of Operation", "Pacific Theater of Operation", "Aviation", "Espionage", "Atlases and Maps", "Reference", "Business and Industry", "Biographies and Autobiographies" and "Russian Book Collection".

Also displayed in the library are Uniforms, Newspaper articles, and metals in cases across the room.

== Gallery of Valor ==
Gallery of Honor

The Gallery of Valor was unveiled November 11, 2006. The displays take visitors through six areas: Training, Shipping and Transportation, U.S. Navy in Action, North Africa-Sicily-Italy, Sabotage and Spy War and the Eastern Front.A diorama depicting Omaha Beach sits in the center of the Gallery of Valor. Also present is a weapons display featuring a training rifle, M1 carbine, M1 Garand and a Colt .45 pistol.

Displays

== Lower Level ==
The Lower Level of the museum features exhibits utilizing war-time artifacts. Categories include World War I (Prelude to World War II), the Rise of the Nazis, Pearl Harbor, the Home Front, the Soviet-German War and a Diorama of Kursk, the largest armored battle of the war. Some artifacts on display in the Lower Level are a German Sturmgewehr 44, the precursor to the modern assault rifle, a Russian uniform and decorations, a Civil Defense helmet and brochures, rations and various other items.

Navajo Code Talkers-Navajo Indians who used their language as code to confuse the Japanese
Col. Mitchell Paige-Medal of Honor recipient for acts of bravery at Guadalcanal
Col. Spann Watson-A member of the Tuskegee Airmen
Master Sergeant Abie Abraham-Survivor of the infamous Bataan Death March
Col. David Glantz-Prominent author on the Soviet-German War
Captain John J. McGinty III-Medal of Honor recipient during Vietnam

== The Blue Room ==
The Blue Room is home to a variety of Navy based artifacts, including several restored vehicles, a functional U-Boat Periscope, and multiple models on display across the room. The pieces in the room will be cycled out each season.

== The Holocaust Room ==
The newest addition to the museum, the Holocaust Room is home to the artifacts showing the true tragedy of WWII. Suitcases, prisoner uniforms, and children's book written by the Nazi regime are a few of the many things housed in this room. Most significant are the keys to Dachau Concentration Camp.
