= Sveti Petar =

Sveti Petar (lit. "Saint Peter") may refer to:

- Sveti Petar (island), an uninhabited Croatian island in the Adriatic Sea
- Sveti Petar, Cres, a village on Cres, Primorje-Gorski Kotar County, Croatia
- Sveti Petar Čvrstec, a village in Koprivnica-Križevci County, Croatia
- Sveti Petar Orehovec, a village and a municipality in the Koprivnica-Križevci County in Croatia
- Sveti Petar u Šumi, a village and municipality in Istria County, Croatia
- Sveti Petar (Makarska, Croatia), a peninsula at the port entrance of Makarska
- Sveti Petar, Varaždin County, a village near Mali Bukovec, Croatia
- Sveti Petar, Karlovac County, a village near Ogulin, Croatia
- Sveti Petar, Mošćenička Draga, a village near Mošćenička Draga, Primorje-Gorski Kotar County, Croatia
- Sveti Petar na Moru, a village near Sveti Filip i Jakov, Croatia
