= Petričević =

Petričević (Serbian Cyrillic: Петричевић) is a Serbo-Croatian surname, a patronymic derived from Petrič, a diminutive of Petar. It may refer to:

- Bogdan Petričević (born 1989), Montenegrin handball player
- Luka Petričević (born 1992), Montenegrin footballer
- Ivana Petričević (born 1974), Montenegrin politician
- Anamarija Petričević (born 1972), retired Croatian swimmer
- Suzana Petričević (born 1959), Serbian actress
- Zvonko Petričević (1940–2009), Croatian basketball player
