= Sveti Petar (Makarska, Croatia) =

Peninsula in Makarska, Croatia

Coordinates: 43°17′36″N 17°0′43″E

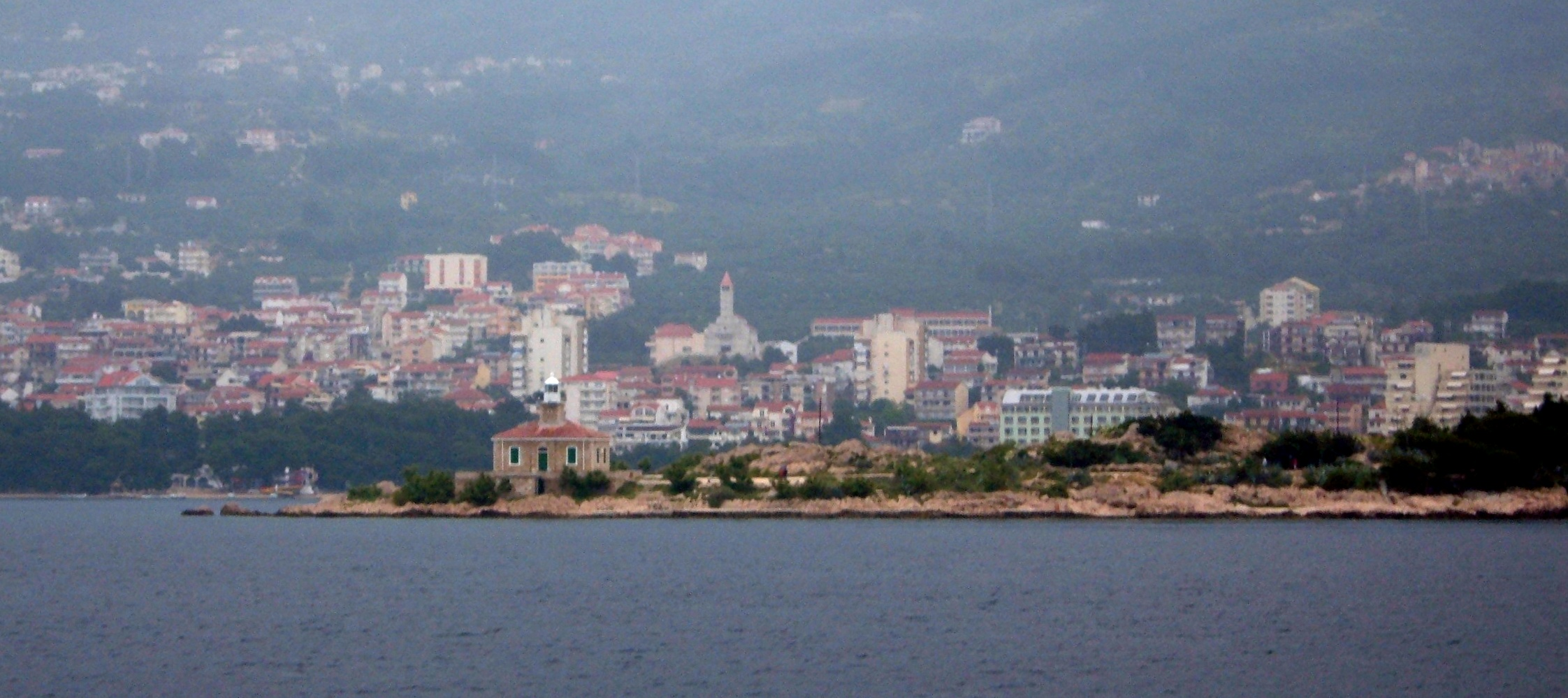
Sv. Petar peninsula

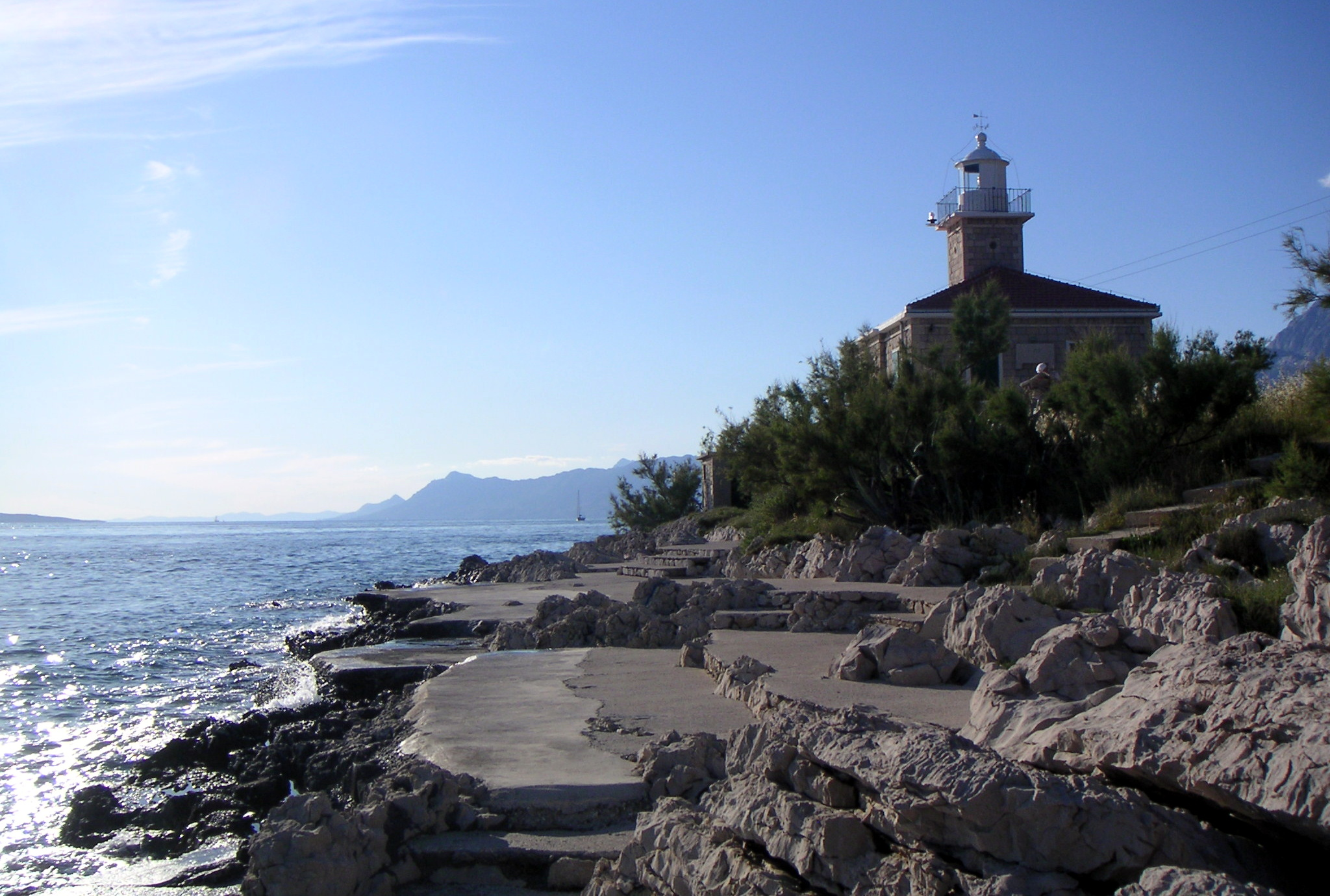
Sv. Petar nudist beach 2009

Sv. Petar (Sveti Petar, St. Peter) is a small peninsula at the port entrance of Makarska, Croatia. It is named after a 13th-century church of St. Peter. Today the peninsula serves as a city park and beach. The rocky beach on the outside of the peninsula is clothing optional but mostly used by naturists. Nearby the beach is the Sv. Petar lighthouse, built in 1884.
