= Pajović =

Pajović is a Serbian surname, a patronymic derived from the given name Paja.

- Darko Pajović (born 1972), Montenegrin politician
- Filip Pajović (born 1993), Serbian footballer
- Lazar Pajović, Serbian footballer
- Tomislav Pajović, Serbian footballer
- Helena Pajović (1979–2000), Serbian figure skater

== See also ==
- Aleš Pajovič (born 1979), Slovenian handball player
