= Perišić =

Perišić (pronounced [pěriʃitɕ]) is a Bosnian, Croatian, Montenegrin and Serbian surname. Notable people with the surname include:

- Aleksandra Perišić (born 2002), Serbian taekwondo practitioner
- Dragan Perišić (born 1979), Serbian footballer
- Goran Perišić (born 1976), Montenegrin footballer
- Ivan Perišić (born 1989), Croatian footballer
- Marica Perišić (born 2000), Serbian judoka
- Miodrag Perišić (1948–2003), Serbian politician
- Momčilo Perišić (born 1944), Serbian general
- Radmila Perišić (born 1980), Serbian judoka
- Risto Perišić, commander of police in Bosnia and Herzegovina during the Bosnian War
- Vladimir Perišić, footballer
