= Veliko Brdo, Croatia =

Veliko Brdo
- Village
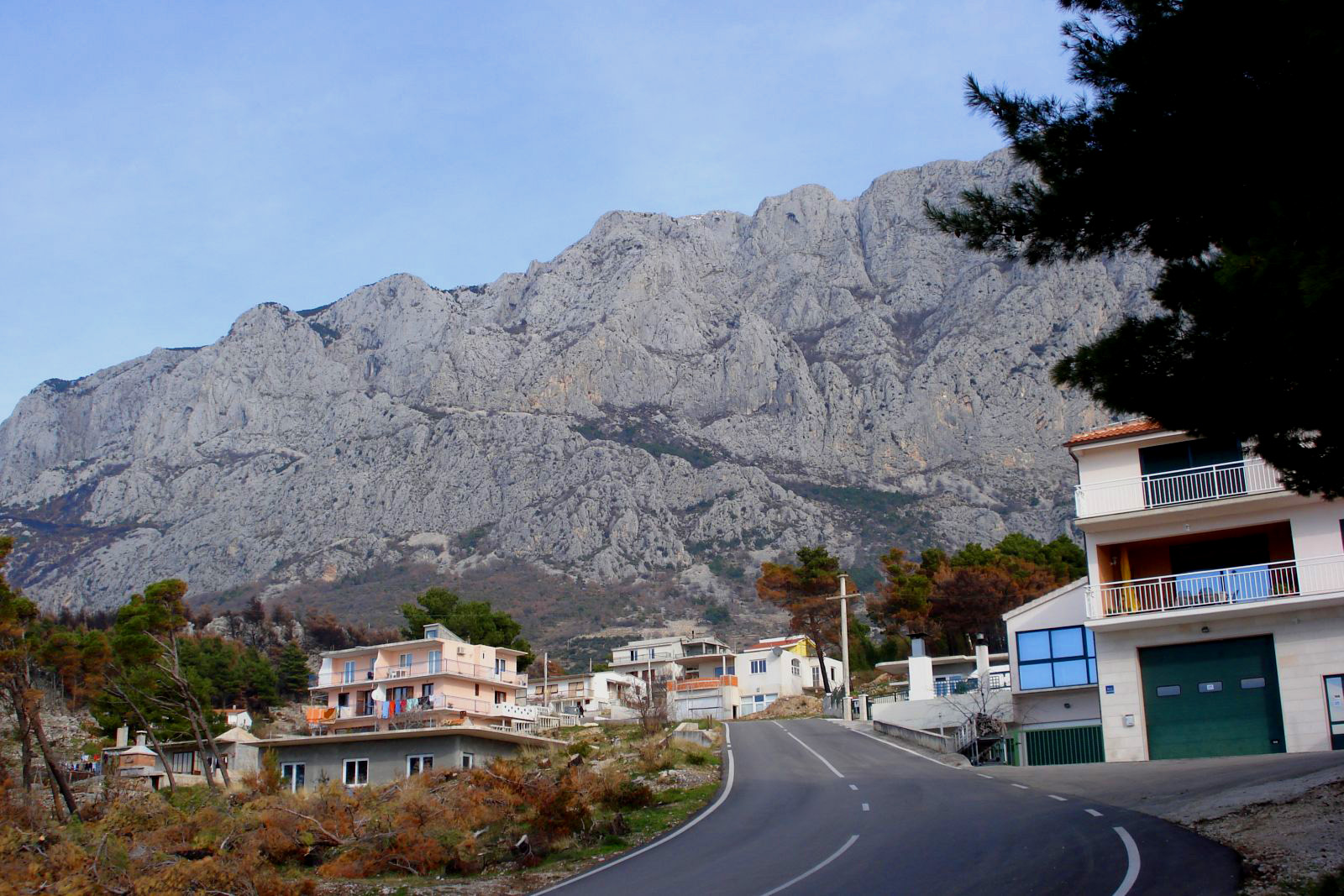

- Location within Croatia
- Coordinates: 43°19′12″N 17°01′16″E
- Country: Croatia
- Region: Dalmatia
- County: Split-Dalmatia County
- Town: Makarska

Area
  - Total: 11.7 km^{2} (4.5 sq mi)
- Elevation: 307 m (1,007 ft)

Population (2021)
  - Total: 492
  - Density: 42.1/km^{2} (109/sq mi)
- Time zone: UTC+1 (CET)
  - Summer (DST): UTC+2 (CEST)
- Postal code: 21325
- Area code: 021

Veliko Brdo is a village in Dalmatia region of Croatia. The settlement is administered as a part of the Town of Makarska and Split-Dalmatia County. According to the 2011 census, the village has 408 inhabitants.
