= Perović =

Perović (Serbian Cyrillic: Перовић, pronounced [pěroʋitɕ]) — transliterated as Perovic or Perovich, meaning "son of Pero" — is a Montenegrin, Serbian and Croatian surname. Notable people with the surname include:

- Ana Perović (born 1977), basketball player
- Darko Perović (born 1965), comics artist
- Dragan Perović, alpine skier
- Drago Perović (1888–1968), Croatian anatomist
- Ivo Perović (1882–1958), politician
- Kosta Perović (born 1985) Serbian basketball player of Montenegrin descent
- Latinka Perović (born 1933), communist politician and historian
- Marko Perović (born 1972), footballer
- Marko Perović (born 1984), footballer
- Miodrag Perović, Montenegrin journalist, businessman, and university professor
- Sandra Perović, Serbian television author, film critic, journalist
- Slavko Perović (born 1934), prominent Serbian and Yugoslav singer
- Slavko Perović (born 1954), Montenegrin politician
- Slavko Perović (footballer) (born 1989), Serbian footballer
- Val Perovic (born 1953), Australian rules footballer
- Vasa Perović (born 1965), Slovenian architect
- Vukan Perović (born 1952), footballer
