= Stefan Pejic =

Welsh actor

- Born: 5 June 1988 (age 38); Swansea, Wales
- Education: Mark Jermin Stage School
- Occupations: actor, magician and singer
- Known for: appeared in many children's television shows for CITV as a child

Stefan Pejic (born 5 June 1988) is a Welsh actor, magician and singer born in Swansea, Wales.

== Career ==
As a child he attended the Mark Jermin Stage School and appeared in many children's television shows for CITV including Jungle Run and Mad for It, adverts for WHSmith (1998), McDonald's (1999), Kelloggs Crispix (2000) and Krazy Kids, Nickelodeon (2001) and television productions including The Gormenghast Trilogy, Goodbye Mr Chips, Teachers , Kids Say the Funniest Things and 2 for 2000.

Pejic appeared in the film About a Boy and as the male lead 'Alfie' in the musical Swansea Women.

Pejic appeared in the 2016–17 pantomime Aladdin at Wolverhampton Grand Theatre between 10 December 2016 and 22 January 2017. He starred alongside Joe McElderry, Lisa Riley, Ian Adams, Lucy Kay, Ben Faulks and Doreen Tipton.
