= Radiša =

Radiša (Cyrillic script: Радиша) is a masculine given name of Slavic origin. It may refer to:

- Radiša Čubrić (born 1962), Serbian former cyclist
- Radiša Ilić (born 1977), Serbian former football goalkeeper

== See also ==
- Radišići
