= Pejaković =

Pejaković is a surname. It may refer to:

- Josip Pejaković (1948–2025), Bosnian actor and writer
- Nikola Pejaković (born 1966), Serbian actor and singer
- Zlatko Pejaković (born 1950), Croatian singer
