= Perica Radić =

Serbian footballer (born 1984)

Personal information
- Full name: Perica Radić
- Date of birth: 13 March 1984 (age 42)
- Place of birth: Smederevo, SFR Yugoslavia
- Height: 1.81 m (5 ft 11 1/2 in)
- Position: Goalkeeper

Senior career*
Years	Team	Apps	(Gls)
2000–2006	Nantes	0	(0)
2006–2008	AC Ajaccio	8	(0)
2008–2009	Reims	4	(0)
2009–2010	Gueugnon	8	(0)
2010–2012	Cannes	12	(0)
2019–2020	US Mandelieu-la-Napoule	18	(0)
- * Club domestic league appearances and goals as of 07:15, 16 August 2010 (UTC)

Perica Radić (Serbian: Перица Радић; born 13 March 1984 in Smederevo, SR Serbia, SFR Yugoslavia) is a Serbian retired football player, who played as a goalkeeper.

== Career ==
Radić played the position of goalkeeper for the French team FC Nantes Atlantique in 2000–2006 and later for AC Ajaccio and Stade de Reims.
