= Petar =

Petar (Bulgarian: Петър, Serbian Cyrillic: Петар) is a South Slavic masculine given name, their variant of the Biblical name Petros cognate to Peter.

Derivative forms include Pero, Pejo, Pera, Perica, Petrica, Periša. Feminine equivalent is Petra.

People mononymously known as Petar include:

- Petar I of Bulgaria (r. 927-969), Emperor (Tsar) of Bulgaria
- Petar I Petrović-Njegoš (1747–1830), Montenegrin ruler, metropolitan and saint
- Peter I of Serbia (1844–1921), Serbian king
- Petar II of Bulgaria, Bulgarian tsar (ruled 1186–1197)
- Petar II Petrović-Njegoš, the Montenegrin ruler (1813–1851)
- Peter II of Yugoslavia, the Yugoslavian king (ruled 1934–1945)
- Petar of Serbia (c. 870 – 917), early Prince of the Serbs
- Petar of Duklja (fl. 10th century), early archont in Dioclea
- Petar Krešimir (died 1074/1075), King of Croatia and Dalmatia
- Petar Delyan (r. 1040-1041), Bulgarian rebel, declared Emperor of Bulgaria

Notable people with the name are numerous:

== See also ==
- Sveti Petar (disambiguation)
- Petrov (disambiguation)
- Petrić
- Petričević
