= Pero (name) =

Pero is a masculine given name. In South Slavic usage (Serbian Cyrillic: Перо) it is a diminutive form of the name Petar. In Portuguese, it was spelled Pêro until the 1990 Orthographic Agreement of Portuguese; now it is spelled Pero. The Portuguese given name Pero is an archaic variant of Pedro.

Notable people with the given name include:

- Pero de Alenquer, 15th century Portuguese explorer of the African coast
- Pero Antić (born 1982), Macedonian former National Basketball Association player
- Pero de Ataíde (c. 1450–1504), Portuguese sea captain, author of a letter giving his account of an expedition in which he participated
- Pero Blazevski (born 1972), Macedonian former basketball player
- Pero Budmani (1835–1914), Croatian Serb linguist and philologist
- Pero Bukejlović (born 1946), Prime Minister of Republika Srpska
- Pero Cameron (born 1974), New Zealand professional basketball player
- Pêro da Covilhã (c. 1460–after 1526), Portuguese diplomat and explorer
- Pero Čingrija (1837–1921), Croatian politician
- Pero Dias, 15th century Portuguese explorer of the African coast
- Pero Dujmović (born 1977), Croatian basketball player and agent
- Pero Escobar (fl. 1470–1500) Portuguese navigator
- Pero Ferrús (fl. 1380), Castilian poet
- Pero Jones (c. 1753–c. 1798), the eponym of a bridge in the city of Bristol in the United Kingdom
- Pero Kovačević (born 1957), Croatian lawyer and politician
- Pero Kvrgić (1927–2020), Croatian actor
- Pero López de Ayala (1332–1407), Castilian statesman, historian, poet, chronicler, chancellor and courtier
- Pero Niño (1378–1453), Castilian privateer
- Pero Pejić (born 1982), Croatian footballer
- Pero Pirker (1927–1972), Croatian and Yugoslav politician
- Pero Popović (painter) (1881–1941), Bosnian Serb artist
- Pero Popović Aga (1905–1930), Yugoslav communist youth
- Pero Simić (1946–2016), Bosnian Serb journalist and historian
- Pero or Pedro de Sintra (fl. 1462), Portuguese explorer of the west African coast
- Pero Stanić (born 1963), Bosnian Croat volleyball player
- Pero Škorić (born 1969), Serbian former footballer
- Pero Stojkić (born 1986), Bosnian retired footballer
- Pero Sudar (born 1951), former Roman Catholic auxiliary bishop of Vrhbosna in Bosnia and Herzegovina
- Pero or Pedro Tafur (c. 1410–c. 1484), Castilian traveler, historian and writer
- Pero Vaz de Caminha (c. 1450–1500), Portuguese explorer, writer of the official report of the discovery of Brazil

Pero is also a surname. Notable people with the surname include:

- A. J. Pero (1959–2015), American heavy metal rock drummer
- Dainier Peró (born 1999), Cuban boxer, brother of Lenier Pero
- George Pero (1916–1988), American tennis player
- Lenier Pero (born 1992), Cuban boxer
- Mike Pero (born 1960), New Zealand businessman

== See also ==
- Perović
- Perić
- Perica
