= 2016–17 Cagliari Calcio season =

Cagliari
2016–17 season
- President: Tommaso Giulini
- Manager: Massimo Rastelli
- Stadium: Stadio Sant'Elia
- Serie A: 11th
- Coppa Italia: Fourth round
- Top goalscorer: League: Marco Borriello (16); All: Marco Borriello (20)
- Highest home attendance: 15,874 vs Juventus (12 February 2017, Serie A)
- Lowest home attendance: 6,200 vs SPAL (15 August 2016, Coppa Italia)
- Average home league attendance: 12,998
Home colours	Away colours	Third colours

The 2016–17 season was Cagliari Calcio's first season back in Serie A after being relegated at the end of the 2014–15 season. The club competed in Serie A, finishing 11th, and in the Coppa Italia, being eliminated in the fourth round.

== Players ==
=== Squad information ===
As of 28 May 2017

Note: Flags indicate national team as defined under FIFA eligibility rules; some limited exceptions apply. Players may hold more than one non-FIFA nationality.

No.	Pos.	Nation	Player
1	GK	BRA	Rafael
3	DF	CHI	Mauricio Isla
4	MF	ITA	Daniele Dessena (captain)
8	MF	ITA	Davide Di Gennaro
9	FW	ITA	Federico Melchiorri
10	MF	BRA	João Pedro
12	DF	BEL	Senna Miangue (on loan from Internazionale)
13	GK	ITA	Roberto Colombo
16	MF	ITA	Paolo Faragò
17	FW	BRA	Diego Farias
18	MF	ITA	Nicolò Barella
19	DF	ITA	Fabio Pisacane
20	MF	ITA	Simone Padoin

No.	Pos.	Nation	Player
21	MF	MDA	Artur Ioniță
22	FW	ITA	Marco Borriello
23	DF	ITA	Luca Ceppitelli
24	DF	ITA	Marco Capuano
25	FW	ITA	Marco Sau (vice-captain)
26	GK	ITA	Luca Crosta
28	GK	BRA	Gabriel (on loan from Milan)
29	DF	ITA	Nicola Murru
30	MF	ITA	Alessandro Deiola
32	FW	PRK	Han Kwang-song
35	DF	POL	Bartosz Salamon
77	MF	GRE	Panagiotis Tachtsidis (on loan from Torino)

== Transfers ==
=== In ===
Date	Pos.	Player	Age	Moving from	Fee	Notes	Source
6 June 2016	DF	(Portugal) Bruno Alves	44	(Turkey) Fenerbahçe	Free		

=== Out ===
Date	Pos.	Player	Age	Moving to	Fee	Notes	Source

== Pre-season and friendlies ==
16 July 2016 Friendly	US Pieve di Bono	0–16	Cagliari	Pejo, Italy
17:30 CEST (UTC+2)		Report	João Pedro 11' 20' 32'; Giannetti 15' 16'; Tetteh 34'; Di Gennaro 38'; Farias 44'; Deiola 57' 62' 71'; Pajač 59' 87'; Čop 74'; Capello 75' 90'	Stadium: Campo Comunale di Celledizzo; Attendance: 500; Referee: Sandu

20 July 2016 Friendly	Cagliari	1–0	(Russia) Terek Grozny	Pejo, Italy
	Sau 5'	Report		Stadium: Campo Comunale di Celledizzo; Referee: Pierpaolo

28 July 2016 Friendly	Cagliari	3–0	Pistoiese	Aritzo, Sardinia, Italy
	Pisacane 3'; Farias 54'; João Pedro 77'	Report		Stadium: Stadio del Vento; Referee: Pierpaolo

31 July 2016 Trofeo Goleador	Cagliari	1–1 (6-5 p)	Crotone	Cagliari, Sardinia, Italy
	João Pedro 18'	Report	Stoian 32'	Stadium: Stadio Sant'Elia

31 July 2016 Trofeo Goleador	Cagliari	2–0	Crotone	Cagliari, Sardinia, Italy
	João Pedro 12' 17'	Report		Stadium: Stadio Sant'Elia

6 August 2016 Trofeo de Maspalomas	Cagliari	2–0	(Portugal) Marítimo	Maspalomas, Gran Canaria, Spain
	Barella 2'; Arras 38'	Report		Stadium: Municipal de Maspalomas; Referee: González Francés

7 August 2016 Trofeo de Maspalomas	Las Palmas (Spain)	1–0	Cagliari	Maspalomas, Gran Canaria, Spain
	Macedo 31'	Report		Stadium: Municipal de Maspalomas; Referee: Pulido

10 August 2016 Friendly	Cagliari	1–1	(Germany) Hamburg	Cagliari, Sardinia, Italy
	Farias 13 p.'	Report	Hunt 34 p.'	Stadium: Stadio Sant'Elia; Referee: Maresca

3 September 2016 Memorial A. Lupino	Rappresentativa Anglona-Romangia	0–12	Cagliari	Castelsardo, Sardinia, Italy
		Report	Giannetti 7' 9' 37' 68' 82'; Borriello 17'; Serra 51' 53' 63' 66'; Melchiorri 58'; Arras 86'	Stadium: Stadio Comunale di via Sedini; Referee: Corgiolu

25 March 2017 Friendly	Sorso	1–9	Cagliari	Sorso, Sardinia, Italy
		Report		Stadium: Stadio La Piramida; Attendance: 3000; Referee: Corgiolu

10 May 2017 II Trofeo Sardegna	Olbia	0–4	Cagliari	Olbia, Sardinia, Italy
	João Pedro 31'; Faragò 38'; Sau 64'; Salamon 85'	Report		Stadium: Stadio Bruno Nespoli

== Competitions ==
=== Overall ===
Competition	Started round	Current position	Final position	First match	Last match
Serie A	Matchday 1	—	11th	21 August 2016	28 May 2017
Coppa Italia	Third round	—	Fourth round	15 August 2016	30 November 2016

Last updated: 28 May 2017

=== Serie A ===
==== League table ====
Pos	Team	Pld	W	D	L	GF	GA	GD	Pts
9	Torino	38	13	14	11	71	66	+5	53
10	Sampdoria	38	12	12	14	49	55	−6	48
11	Cagliari	38	14	5	19	55	76	−21	47
12	Sassuolo	38	13	7	18	58	63	−5	46
13	Udinese	38	12	9	17	47	56	−9	45

Source: Serie A, Soccerway
Rules for classification: 1) Points; 2) Head-to-head points; 3) Head-to-head goal difference; 4) Goal difference; 5) Goals scored; 6) Draw.

==== Results summary ====
Overall								Home						Away					
Pld	W	D	L	GF	GA	GD	Pts	W	D	L	GF	GA	GD	W	D	L	GF	GA	GD
38	14	5	19	55	76	−21	47	11	3	5	38	34	+4	3	2	14	17	42	−25

Last updated: 28 May 2017.
Source: Competitive matches

==== Results by round ====
Round	1	2	3	4	5	6	7	8	9	10	11	12	13	14	15	16	17	18	19	20	21	22	23	24	25	26	27	28	29	30	31	32	33	34	35	36	37	38
Ground	A	H	A	H	A	H	H	A	H	A	H	A	A	H	A	H	A	H	A	H	A	H	A	H	A	A	H	A	H	A	H	H	A	H	A	H	A	H
Result	L	D	L	W	L	W	W	W	L	L	W	L	L	W	D	L	L	W	L	W	L	D	L	L	D	W	L	L	D	W	L	W	L	W	L	W	L	W
Position	18	16	18	15	17	13	10	8	10	15	9	11	14	12	12	14	15	14	14	10	11	14	15	15	14	12	13	15	14	13	13	12	12	12	13	12	13	11

Updated to match(es) played on 28 May 2017. Source: Competitive matches
A = Away; H = Home; W = Win; D = Draw; L = Loss

==== Matches ====
21 August 2016 1	Genoa	3–1	Cagliari	Genoa
20:45 CEST (UTC+02:00)	Izzo (yellow card) 15'; Burdisso (yellow card) 28'; Ntcham 78'; Laxalt 79'; Veloso (yellow card) 81'; Rigoni 88', (yellow card) 90'	Report	Ioniță (yellow card) 11'; Borriello (yellow card) 36', (goal) 66'; Munari (yellow card) 86'	Stadium: Stadio Luigi Ferraris; Attendance: 20,443; Referee: Daniele Orsato

28 August 2016 2	Cagliari	2–2	Roma	Cagliari
20:45 CEST (UTC+02:00)	Isla (yellow card) 21'; Murru (yellow card) 23'; Salamon (yellow card) 39'; Borriello 56'; Sau 87'	Report	Perotti 6' (pen.); Florenzi (yellow card) 45'; Strootman 46'	Stadium: Stadio Sant'Elia; Attendance: 15,406; Referee: Paolo Mazzoleni

11 September 2016 3	Bologna	2–1	Cagliari	Bologna
12:30 CEST (UTC+02:00)	Verdi 23'; Di Francesco 74'; Džemaili (yellow card) 90+3'	Report	Barella (yellow card) 21'; Ioniță (yellow card) 32'; Storari (red card) 54'; Alves 83', (yellow card) 90+5'	Stadium: Stadio Renato Dall'Ara; Attendance: 17,903; Referee: Rosario Abisso

18 September 2016 4	Cagliari	3–0	Atalanta	Cagliari
15:00 CEST (UTC+02:00)	Borriello 8', 73'; Pisacane (yellow card) 35'; Sau 55'; Munari (yellow card) 88'	Report	Toloi (yellow card) 44'; Carmona (yellow card) 48'	Stadium: Stadio Sant'Elia; Attendance: 12,301; Referee: Michael Fabbri

21 September 2016 5	Juventus	4–0	Cagliari	Turin
20:45 CEST (UTC+02:00)	Rugani 14', (yellow card) 64'; Higuaín 33'; Dani Alves 39'; Ceppitelli 84' (o.g.)	Report	Di Gennaro (yellow card) 13'; Bittante (yellow card) 41'; Munari (yellow card) 90+2'	Stadium: Juventus Stadium; Attendance: 38,949; Referee: Maurizio Mariani

26 September 2016 6	Cagliari	2–1	Sampdoria	Cagliari
20:45 CEST (UTC+02:00)	João Pedro 37'; Isla (yellow card) 69'; Melchiorri 88'; Padoin (yellow card) 90+1'	Report	Muriel (yellow card) 19'; Škriniar (yellow card) 49'; Cigarini (yellow card) 65'; Fernandes 86'	Stadium: Stadio Sant'Elia; Attendance: 14,117; Referee: Claudio Gavillucci

2 October 2016 7	Cagliari	2–1	Crotone	Cagliari
15:00 CEST (UTC+02:00)	Di Gennaro 38'; Padoin 56'	Report	Palladino (yellow card) 43'; Rosi (yellow card) 48'; Rohdén (yellow card) 75'; Stoian 90+1'; Dussenne (yellow card) 90+2'	Stadium: Stadio Sant'Elia; Attendance: 14,501; Referee: Piero Giacomelli

16 October 2016 8	Internazionale	1–2	Cagliari	Milan
15:00 CEST (UTC+02:00)	João Mário (yellow card) 27', (goal) 56'	Report	Alves (yellow card) 25'; Sau (yellow card) 42'; Munari (yellow card) 61'; Melchiorri 71'; Tachtsidis (yellow card) 78'; Handanović 85' (o.g.); Barella (yellow card) 86'	Stadium: San Siro; Attendance: 43,757; Referee: Paolo Valeri

23 October 2016 9	Cagliari	3–5	Fiorentina	Cagliari
15:00 CEST (UTC+02:00)	Di Gennaro 2'; Tachtsidis (yellow card) 33'; Capuano 62'; Murru (yellow card) 70'; Borriello 77'	Report	Astori (yellow card) 14'; Kalinić 20', 40', 53'; Bernardeschi 26', 32', (yellow card) 84'	Stadium: Stadio Sant'Elia; Attendance: 15,619; Referee: Carmine Russo

26 October 2016 10	Lazio	4–1	Cagliari	Rome
20:45 CEST (UTC+02:00)	Keita 6', (yellow card) 42'; Immobile 23' (pen.), 28'; Wallace (yellow card) 30'; Felipe Anderson 79'	Report	Ceppitelli (yellow card) 22'; Tachtsidis (yellow card) 42'; Dessena (yellow card) 80'; Wallace 87' (o.g.)	Stadium: Stadio Olimpico; Attendance: 10,000; Referee: Domenico Celi

31 October 2016 11	Cagliari	2–1	Palermo	Cagliari
21:00 CET (UTC+01:00)	Sau (yellow card) 28'; Pisacane (yellow card) 33'; Dessena 53', 64'; Padoin (yellow card) 57'; Storari (yellow card) 78'; Barella (yellow card) 90+4'	Report	Rispoli (yellow card) 18'; Quaison (yellow card) 33'; Nestorovski 79'; Aleesami (yellow card) 90'	Stadium: Stadio Sant'Elia; Attendance: 14,625; Referee: Massimiliano Irrati

5 November 2016 12	Torino	5–1	Cagliari	Turin
18:00 CET (UTC+01:00)	Belotti 2', 59' (pen.); Ljajić 11'; Baselli (yellow card) 27', (goal) 51'; Benassi 38'	Report	Melchiorri 41'; Farias (yellow card) 58'; Dessena (red card) 58'; Ceppitelli (yellow card) 74'	Stadium: Stadio Olimpico Grande Torino; Attendance: 19,870; Referee: Maurizio Mariani

19 November 2016 13	Chievo	1–0	Cagliari	Verona
15:00 CET (UTC+01:00)	Radovanović (yellow card) 40'; Gobbi 53'; Spolli (yellow card) 62'; Cacciatore (yellow card) 90+2'	Report	Bittante (yellow card) 29'; Ceppitelli (yellow card) 57'; Munari (yellow card) 88'	Stadium: Stadio Marc'Antonio Bentegodi; Attendance: 10,000; Referee: Claudio Gavillucci

27 November 2016 14	Cagliari	2–1	Udinese	Cagliari
15:00 CET (UTC+01:00)	Di Gennaro (yellow card) 21'; Farias 35' (pen.); Sau 58', (yellow card) 70'; Bittante (yellow card) 65'; Isla (yellow card) 68'	Report	Karnezis (yellow card) 35'; Fofana 51'; Faraoni (yellow card) 65'; Wagué (yellow card) 90+3'	Stadium: Stadio Sant'Elia; Attendance: 11,648; Referee: Luca Pairetto

4 December 2016 15	Pescara	1–1	Cagliari	Pescara
15:00 CET (UTC+01:00)	Memushaj (yellow card) 29'; Benali (yellow card) 39'; Caprari 90+2'	Report	Borriello 24', (yellow card) 73'; Di Gennaro (yellow card) 28' (yellow-red card) 34'; Dessena (yellow card) 30'	Stadium: Stadio Adriatico – Giovanni Cornacchia; Attendance: 11,575; Referee: Daniele Doveri

11 December 2016 16	Cagliari	0–5	Napoli	Cagliari
12:30 CET (UTC+01:00)	Isla (yellow card) 20'; Barella (yellow card) 36'; Padoin (yellow card) 66'; Dessena (yellow card) 74'	Report	Mertens 34', 69', 72'; Koulibaly (yellow card) 39'; Hamšík 45', (yellow card) 74'; Zieliński 51'; Hysaj (yellow card) 62'	Stadium: Stadio Sant'Elia; Attendance: 13,989; Referee: Gianpaolo Calvarese

17 December 2016 17	Empoli	2–0	Cagliari	Empoli
15:00 CET (UTC+01:00)	Mchedlidze 8', 72', (yellow card) 65'; Saponara (yellow card) 14'; Costa (yellow card) 35'; Krunić (yellow card) 42'; Marilungo (yellow card) 45+2'; Gilardino (yellow card) 90+1'	Report	Padoin (yellow card) 5'; Melchiorri (yellow card) 43'; Dessena (yellow card) 55'; Farias (yellow card) 57'; Isla (yellow card) 71'; Colombo (red card) 80'	Stadium: Stadio Carlo Castellani; Attendance: 8,352; Referee: Nicola Rizzoli
Note: Roberto Colombo was sent off while a substitute.

22 December 2016 18	Cagliari	4–3	Sassuolo	Cagliari
20:45 CET (UTC+01:00)	Sau 14'; Farias (yellow card) 45', (goal) 73', 76'; Di Gennaro (yellow card) 49'; Borriello 62'; Padoin (yellow card) 67'	Report	Ragusa (yellow card) 3'; Adjapong (yellow card) 18', (goal) 29'; Pellegrini 33', (red card) 34'; Acerbi 58' (pen.); Mazzitelli (yellow card) 77'	Stadium: Stadio Sant'Elia; Attendance: 11,440; Referee: Domenico Celi

8 January 2017 19	Milan	1–0	Cagliari	Milan
18:00 CET (UTC+01:00)	Bacca 88'	Report	Isla (yellow card) 89'; Alves (red card) 90+4'	Stadium: San Siro; Attendance: 31,113; Referee: Piero Giacomelli

15 January 2017 20	Cagliari	4–1	Genoa	Cagliari
12:30 CET (UTC+01:00)	Borriello 40', 60'; João Pedro 44', (yellow card) 52'; Capuano (yellow card) 49' (yellow-red card) 79'; Colombo (yellow card) 61'; Farias 64' (pen.), (yellow card) 65'	Report	Simeone 28'; Cataldi (yellow card) 33'; Rigoni (yellow card) 76'	Stadium: Stadio Sant'Elia; Attendance: 6,915; Referee: Michael Fabbri
Note: Roberto Colombo was cautioned for dissent while a substitute.

22 January 2017 21	Roma	1–0	Cagliari	Rome
20:45 CET (UTC+01:00)	Džeko 55'; Manolas (yellow card) 87'	Report	Pisacane (yellow card) 18'; Ceppitelli (yellow card) 82'; Barella (yellow card) 89'; João Pedro (red card) 90+3'	Stadium: Stadio Olimpico; Attendance: 23,961; Referee: Marco Guida

28 January 2017 22	Cagliari	1–1	Bologna	Cagliari
15:00 CET (UTC+01:00)	Sau (yellow card) 6'; Tachtsidis (yellow card) 31'; Borriello 90+2'	Report	Maietta (yellow card) 13'; Donsah (yellow card) 35'; Destro 64'; Viviani (yellow card) 80' (red card) 88'; Krafth (red card) 90+1'	Stadium: Stadio Sant'Elia; Attendance: 11,114; Referee: Luca Pairetto

5 February 2017 23	Atalanta	2–0	Cagliari	Bergamo
15:00 CET (UTC+01:00)	Gómez 4', 16'; Masiello (yellow card) 58'; Conti (yellow card) 63'; Kurtić (yellow card) 83'; Spinazzola (yellow card) 88'	Report	Ceppitelli (yellow card) 54'; Barella (yellow card) 61'	Stadium: Stadio Atleti Azzurri d'Italia; Attendance: 14,782; Referee: Claudio Gavillucci

12 February 2017 24	Cagliari	0–2	Juventus	Cagliari
20:45 CET (UTC+01:00)	Barella (yellow card) 28' (yellow-red card) 67'; Isla (yellow card) 78'; Di Gennaro (yellow card) 86'	Report	Lichtsteiner (yellow card) 13'; Chiellini (yellow card) 14'; Higuaín 37', 47'; Marchisio (yellow card) 43'; Cuadrado (yellow card) 57'; Mandžukić (yellow card) 90+1'	Stadium: Stadio Sant'Elia; Attendance: 15,874; Referee: Gianpaolo Calvarese

19 February 2017 25	Sampdoria	1–1	Cagliari	Genoa
15:00 CET (UTC+01:00)	Quagliarella 22', (yellow card) 87'; Fernandes (yellow card) 33'; Torreira (yellow card) 59'; Viviano (yellow card) 81'	Report	Isla 6'; Murru (yellow card) 25'; João Pedro (yellow card) 44'; Tachtsidis (yellow card) 62'; Gabriel (yellow card) 78'; Ioniță (yellow card) 85'; Borriello (yellow card) 88'	Stadium: Stadio Luigi Ferraris; Attendance: 18,434; Referee: Davide Massa

26 February 2017 26	Crotone	1–2	Cagliari	Crotone
15:00 CET (UTC+01:00)	Stoian 10'; Rosi (yellow card) 51'; Acosty (yellow card) 59'; Barberis (yellow card) 89'	Report	João Pedro 32'; Barella (yellow card) 61'; Borriello 69'	Stadium: Stadio Ezio Scida; Attendance: 7,341; Referee: Daniele Orsato

5 March 2017 27	Cagliari	1–5	Internazionale	Cagliari
15:00 CET (UTC+01:00)	Borriello 42'; Barella (yellow card) 55'; Ioniță (yellow card) 72'	Report	Perišić 34', 47'; Banega 39'; Icardi 67' (pen.); Gagliardini 89'	Stadium: Stadio Sant'Elia; Attendance: 15,649; Referee: Marco Di Bello

12 March 2017 28	Fiorentina	1–0	Cagliari	Florence
20:45 CET (UTC+01:00)	Tomović (yellow card) 56'; Astori (yellow card) 61'; Kalinić 90+2'	Report	Miangue (yellow card) 77'	Stadium: Stadio Artemio Franchi; Attendance: 25,656; Referee: Claudio Gavillucci

19 March 2017 29	Cagliari	0–0	Lazio	Cagliari
15:00 CET (UTC+01:00)	Faragò (yellow card) 28'; Pisacane (yellow card) 71'; Isla (yellow card) 72'	Report	Biglia (yellow card) 70'; De Vrij (yellow card) 81'	Stadium: Stadio Sant'Elia; Attendance: 15,536; Referee: Marco Guida

2 April 2017 30	Palermo	1–3	Cagliari	Palermo
15:00 CEST (UTC+02:00)	Gazzi (yellow card) 5'; González 26'; Bruno Henrique (yellow card) 75'; Trajkovski (yellow card) 90'	Report	Isla (yellow card) 16'; Ioniță 48', 88'; Borriello 58'	Stadium: Stadio Renzo Barbera; Attendance: 11,938; Referee: Paolo Valeri

9 April 2017 31	Cagliari	2–3	Torino	Cagliari
15:00 CEST (UTC+02:00)	Borriello 19' (pen.); Pisacane (yellow card) 31'; João Pedro (yellow card) 69'; Han Kwang-song 90+5'	Report	Carlão (yellow card) 18'; Ljajić 33', (yellow card) 43'; Belotti 39'; Acquah (yellow card) 24' (yellow-red card) 90+1', (goal) 53'; Falque (yellow card) 90'; Padelli (yellow card) 90+1'	Stadium: Stadio Sant'Elia; Attendance: 12,103; Referee: Gianluca Rocchi

15 April 2017 32	Cagliari	4–0	Chievo	Cagliari
15:00 CEST (UTC+02:00)	Borriello 11'; Sau 15'; Deiola (yellow card) 35'; João Pedro 40', 90'; Ioniță (yellow card) 88'	Report	Castro (yellow card) 16'; Cesar (yellow card) 76'	Stadium: Stadio Sant'Elia; Attendance: 10,746; Referee: Gianluca Manganiello

23 April 2017 33	Udinese	2–1	Cagliari	Udine
15:00 CEST (UTC+02:00)	Felipe (yellow card) 58'; Perica 70'; Angella 73'	Report	Barella (yellow card) 69'; Borriello 86'	Stadium: Stadio Friuli; Attendance: 16,623; Referee: Valerio Marini

30 April 2017 34	Cagliari	1–0	Pescara	Cagliari
15:00 CEST (UTC+02:00)	João Pedro 23' (pen.); Alves (yellow card) 64'	Report	Fornasier (yellow card) 22'; Miličević (yellow card) 44'; Kastanos (yellow card) 83'; Muntari (yellow card) 90' (yellow-red card) 90+6'	Stadium: Stadio Sant'Elia; Attendance: 11,125; Referee: Daniele Minelli

6 May 2017 35	Napoli	3–1	Cagliari	Naples
18:00 CEST (UTC+02:00)	Mertens 2', 49'; Zieliński (yellow card) 55'; Insigne 67'	Report	Farias 90+2'	Stadium: Stadio San Paolo; Attendance: 47,281; Referee: Piero Giacomelli

14 May 2017 36	Cagliari	3–2	Empoli	Cagliari
15:00 CEST (UTC+02:00)	Sau 7'; Farias 17', 45'; Pisacane (yellow card) 40'; Alves (yellow card) 67'	Report	Bellusci (yellow card) 45+1'; El Kaddouri (yellow card) 49'; Zajc 79'; Maccarone 84'	Stadium: Stadio Sant'Elia; Attendance: 12,021; Referee: Maurizio Mariani

21 May 2017 37	Sassuolo	6–2	Cagliari	Reggio Emilia
15:00 CEST (UTC+02:00)	Magnanelli 7'; Berardi 12'; Politano 13'; Borriello 34' (o.g.); Peluso (yellow card) 36'; Iemmello 56' (pen.); Matri 90'	Report	Sau 25', (yellow card) 85'; Pisacane (yellow card) 31'; Alves (yellow card) 54'; Borriello (yellow card) 56'; Ioniță 60'; Isla (yellow card) 72'	Stadium: Mapei Stadium – Città del Tricolore; Attendance: 10,806; Referee: Luigi Nasca

28 May 2017 38	Cagliari	2–1	Milan	Cagliari
15:00 CEST (UTC+02:00)	João Pedro 17', (yellow card) 42'; Deiola (yellow card) 61'; Padoin (yellow card) 78'; Pisacane 90+3'	Report	Gómez (yellow card) 65'; Paletta (yellow card) 68' (yellow-red card) 75'; Lapadula 72' (pen.)	Stadium: Stadio Sant'Elia; Attendance: 12,225; Referee: Rosario Abisso

=== Coppa Italia ===
15 August 2016 Third round	Cagliari	5–1	SPAL	Cagliari
21:00 CEST (UTC+02:00)	Borriello 24', 44', 65', 83'; Sau 40'	Report	Cerri (yellow card) 76'; Antenucci 85'	Stadium: Stadio Sant'Elia; Attendance: 6,200; Referee: Davide Ghersini

30 November 2016 Fourth round	Sampdoria	3–0	Cagliari	Genoa
21:00 CET (UTC+01:00)	Álvarez 13'; Regini (yellow card) 27'; Cigarini (yellow card) 56'; Schick 71', 90'	Report	Melchiorri (yellow card) 87'	Stadium: Stadio Luigi Ferraris; Attendance: 4,479; Referee: Michael Fabbri

== Statistics ==
=== Appearances and goals ===
No.	Pos	Nat	Player	Total		Serie A		Coppa Italia	
No.	Pos	Nat	Player	Apps	Goals	Apps	Goals	Apps	Goals
Goalkeepers
1	GK	(Brazil) BRA	Rafael	22	0	19+2	0	1	0
12	GK	(Italy) ITA	Luca Crosta	1	0	1	0	0	0
13	GK	(Italy) ITA	Roberto Colombo	1	0	0+1	0	0	0
28	GK	(Brazil) BRA	Gabriel	3	0	3	0	0	0
Defenders
2	DF	(Portugal) POR	Bruno Alves	37	1	36	1	1	0
15	DF	(Portugal) POR	Vasco Oliveira	1	0	0	0	0+1	0
19	DF	(Italy) ITA	Fabio Pisacane	29	1	29	1	0	0
23	DF	(Italy) ITA	Luca Ceppitelli	20	0	19	0	1	0
24	DF	(Italy) ITA	Marco Capuano	13	1	8+4	1	1	0
27	DF	(Ukraine) UKR	Illia Briukhov	1	0	0	0	1	0
29	DF	(Italy) ITA	Nicola Murru	27	0	26	0	1	0
35	DF	(Poland) POL	Bartosz Salamon	17	0	9+6	0	1+1	0
36	DF	(Italy) ITA	Andrea Mastino	1	0	0	0	1	0
Midfielders
3	MF	(Chile) CHI	Mauricio Isla	35	1	32+2	1	1	0
4	MF	(Italy) ITA	Daniele Dessena	19	2	16+2	2	1	0
8	MF	(Italy) ITA	Davide Di Gennaro	22	2	18+2	2	2	0
10	MF	(Brazil) BRA	João Pedro	22	7	17+5	7	0	0
12	MF	(Belgium) BEL	Senna Miangue	4	0	0+4	0	0	0
16	MF	(Italy) ITA	Paolo Faragò	9	0	1+8	0	0	0
18	MF	(Italy) ITA	Nicolò Barella	29	0	22+5	0	1+1	0
20	MF	(Italy) ITA	Simone Padoin	32	1	25+6	1	1	0
21	MF	(Moldova) MDA	Artur Ioniță	19	3	14+4	3	1	0
30	MF	(Italy) ITA	Alessandro Deiola	6	0	3+2	0	0+1	0
33	MF	(Italy) ITA	Roberto Biancu	2	0	0+1	0	0+1	0
34	MF	(Brazil) BRA	Matias Antonini Lui	1	0	0	0	1	0
38	MF	(Italy) ITA	Federico Serra	2	0	0+1	0	0+1	0
77	MF	(Greece) GRE	Panagiotis Tachtsidis	26	0	24+2	0	0	0
Forwards
9	FW	(Italy) ITA	Federico Melchiorri	11	3	4+6	3	1	0
17	FW	(Brazil) BRA	Diego Farias	20	7	12+8	7	0	0
22	FW	(Italy) ITA	Marco Borriello	37	20	31+5	16	1	4
25	FW	(Italy) ITA	Marco Sau	35	8	29+5	7	1	1
32	FW	(North Korea) PRK	Han Kwang-song	5	1	0+5	1	0	0
Players transferred out during the season
16	MF	(Italy) ITA	Gianni Munari	12	0	3+8	0	1	0
26	DF	(Italy) ITA	Luca Bittante	5	0	3+2	0	0	0
30	GK	(Italy) ITA	Marco Storari	16	0	15	0	1	0
32	FW	(Italy) ITA	Niccolò Giannetti	12	0	1+10	0	1	0
32	FW	(Colombia) COL	Víctor Ibarbo	3	0	0+3	0	0	0
33	MF	(Croatia) CRO	Marko Pajač	1	0	0+1	0	0	0

Last updated: 28 May 2017
Source: Competitions

=== Goalscorers ===
Rank	No.	Pos	Nat	Name	Serie A	Coppa Italia	Total
1	22	FW	(Italy)	Marco Borriello	16	4	20
2	25	FW	(Italy)	Marco Sau	7	1	8
3	10	MF	(Brazil)	João Pedro	7	0	7
3	17	FW	(Brazil)	Diego Farias	7	0	7
5	9	FW	(Italy)	Federico Melchiorri	3	0	3
5	21	MF	(Romania)	Artur Ioniță	3	0	3
7	4	MF	(Italy)	Daniele Dessena	2	0	2
7	8	MF	(Italy)	Davide Di Gennaro	2	0	2
9	2	DF	(Portugal)	Bruno Alves	1	0	1
9	3	MF	(Chile)	Mauricio Isla	1	0	1
9	19	DF	(Italy)	Fabio Pisacane	1	0	1
9	20	MF	(Italy)	Simone Padoin	1	0	1
9	24	DF	(Italy)	Marco Capuano	1	0	1
9	32	FW	(North Korea)	Han Kwang-song	1	0	1
Own goal					2	0	2
Totals					55	5	60

Last updated: 28 May 2017

=== Clean sheets ===
Rank	No.	Pos	Nat	Name	Serie A	Coppa Italia	Total
1	1	GK	(Brazil)	Rafael	4	0	4
Totals					4	0	4

Last updated: 28 May 2017

=== Disciplinary record ===
No.	Pos	Nat	Player	Serie A			Coppa Italia			Total		
No.	Pos	Nat	Player	Booked	(yellow card) (yellow-red card)	Sent off (straight red)	Booked	(yellow card) (yellow-red card)	Sent off (straight red)	Booked	(yellow card) (yellow-red card)	Sent off (straight red)
1	GK	(Brazil)	Rafael	0	0	0	0	0	0	0	0	0
13	GK	(Italy)	Roberto Colombo	1	0	1	0	0	0	1	0	1
26	GK	(Italy)	Luca Crosta	0	0	0	0	0	0	0	0	0
28	GK	(Brazil)	Gabriel	1	0	0	0	0	0	1	0	0
30	GK	(Italy)	Marco Storari	1	0	1	0	0	0	1	0	1
2	DF	(Portugal)	Bruno Alves	5	0	1	0	0	0	5	0	1
19	DF	(Italy)	Fabio Pisacane	7	0	0	0	0	0	7	0	0
23	DF	(Italy)	Luca Ceppitelli	5	0	0	0	0	0	5	0	0
24	DF	(Italy)	Marco Capuano	0	1	0	0	0	0	0	1	0
26	DF	(Italy)	Luca Bittante	3	0	0	0	0	0	3	0	0
29	DF	(Italy)	Nicola Murru	3	0	0	0	0	0	3	0	0
35	DF	(Poland)	Bartosz Salamon	1	0	0	0	0	0	1	0	0
3	MF	(Chile)	Mauricio Isla	10	0	0	0	0	0	10	0	0
4	MF	(Italy)	Daniele Dessena	4	0	1	0	0	0	4	0	1
8	MF	(Italy)	Davide Di Gennaro	4	1	0	0	0	0	4	1	0
10	MF	(Brazil)	João Pedro	4	0	1	0	0	0	4	0	1
12	MF	(Belgium)	Senna Miangue	1	0	0	0	0	0	1	0	0
16	MF	(Italy)	Paolo Faragò	1	0	0	0	0	0	1	0	0
16	MF	(Italy)	Gianni Munari	5	0	0	0	0	0	5	0	0
18	MF	(Italy)	Nicolò Barella	9	1	0	0	0	0	9	1	0
20	MF	(Italy)	Simone Padoin	6	0	0	0	0	0	6	0	0
21	MF	(Moldova)	Artur Ioniță	5	0	0	0	0	0	5	0	0
30	MF	(Italy)	Alessandro Deiola	2	0	0	0	0	0	2	0	0
77	MF	(Greece)	Panagiotis Tachtsidis	5	0	0	0	0	0	5	0	0
9	FW	(Italy)	Federico Melchiorri	1	0	0	0	0	0	1	0	0
17	FW	(Brazil)	Diego Farias	4	0	0	0	0	0	4	0	0
22	FW	(Italy)	Marco Borriello	4	0	0	0	0	0	4	0	0
25	FW	(Italy)	Marco Sau	5	0	0	0	0	0	5	0	0
Totals				97	3	5	1	0	0	98	3	5

Last updated: 28 May 2017
