= 2014–15 SSC Napoli season =

Napoli
2014–15 season
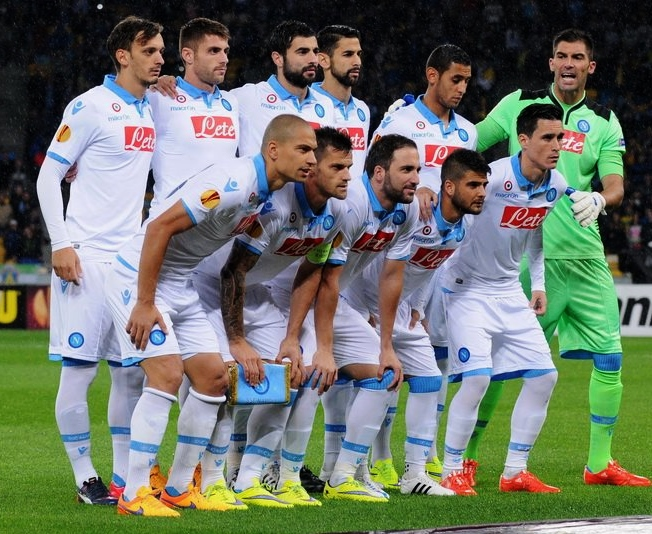
- Napoli players lining up before a UEFA Europa League match against Dnipro Dnipropetrovsk in May 2015
- President: Aurelio De Laurentiis
- Manager: Rafael Benítez
- Stadium: Stadio San Paolo
- Serie A: 5th
- Coppa Italia: Semi-finals
- UEFA Champions League: Play-off round
- UEFA Europa League: Semi-finals
- Supercoppa Italiana: Winners
- Top goalscorer: League: Gonzalo Higuaín (18); All: Gonzalo Higuaín (29)
- Highest home attendance: 53,006 vs Juventus (11 January 2015, Serie A)
- Lowest home attendance: 6,490 vs Slovan Bratislava (11 December 2014, Europa League)
- Average home league attendance: 32,266
Home colours	Away colours	Third colours

The 2014–15 season was Società Sportiva Calcio Napoli's 69th season in Serie A. The team competed in Serie A, the Coppa Italia, the UEFA Champions League, the UEFA Europa League, and the Supercoppa Italiana.

== Players ==
=== Squad information ===
As of 1 September 2014

Note: Flags indicate national team as defined under FIFA eligibility rules; some limited exceptions apply. Players may hold more than one non-FIFA nationality.

No.	Pos.	Nation	Player
1	GK	BRA	Rafael
3	DF	CRO	Ivan Strinić
4	DF	BRA	Henrique
5	DF	URU	Miguel Britos
6	MF	NED	Jonathan de Guzmán
7	FW	ESP	José Callejón
8	MF	BRA	Jorginho
9	FW	ARG	Gonzalo Higuaín
11	DF	ITA	Christian Maggio (1st vice-captain)
14	FW	BEL	Dries Mertens
15	GK	ITA	Roberto Colombo
16	DF	ITA	Giandomenico Mesto
17	MF	SVK	Marek Hamšík (captain)
18	DF	COL	Juan Zúñiga (2nd vice-captain)

No.	Pos.	Nation	Player
19	MF	ESP	David López
21	FW	ESP	Michu (on loan from Swansea City)
22	MF	CRO	Josip Radošević
23	FW	ITA	Manolo Gabbiadini
24	FW	ITA	Lorenzo Insigne
26	DF	SEN	Kalidou Koulibaly
31	DF	ALG	Faouzi Ghoulam
33	DF	ESP	Raúl Albiol
45	GK	ARG	Mariano Andújar
77	MF	URU	Walter Gargano
83	GK	ITA	Antonio Rosati
88	MF	SUI	Gökhan Inler (3rd vice-captain)
91	FW	COL	Duván Zapata

== Transfers ==
=== In ===
No.	Pos.	Nat.	Name	Age	EU	Moving from	Type	Transfer window	Ends	Transfer fee	Source
26	DF	(Senegal)	Kalidou Koulibaly	23	EU	Genk	Full Ownership	Summer	2019	€7M	S.S.C. Napoli
21	FW	(Spain)	Michu	28	EU	Swansea City	Loan	Summer	2015	€1.7M	S.S.C. Napoli
6	MF	(Netherlands)	Jonathan de Guzmán	27	EU	Villarreal	Full Ownership	Summer	2018	€6M	S.S.C. Napoli
19	MF	(Spain)	David López	25	EU	Espanyol	Full Ownership	Summer	2019	€5.3M	S.S.C. Napoli
23	FW	(Italy)	Manolo Gabbiadini	23	EU	Sampdoria	Full Ownership	Summer	2019	€13M	S.S.C. Napoil

=== Out ===
No.	Pos.	Nat.	Name	Age	EU	Moving to	Type	Transfer window	Transfer fee	Source
85	MF	(Switzerland)	Valon Behrami	29	EU	Hamburger SV (Germany)	Transfer	Summer	€3,500,000	S.S.C. Napoli
99	FW	(Chile)	Eduardo Vargas	24	EU	Queens Park Rangers (England)	Loan	Summer	N/A	
	MF	(Morocco)	Omar El Kaddouri	23	EU	Torino	Loan	Summer	N/A	
	DF	(Italy)	Alessandro Gamberini	32	EU	Chievo	Transfer	Summer	Undisclosed	
	GK	(Italy)	Diamante Crispino	19	EU	Como	Released	Summer	Free	
	ST	(Italy)	Emanuele Calaiò	32	EU	Catania	Transfer	Summer	Undisclosed	
28	DF	(Italy)	Paolo Cannavaro	33	EU	Sassuolo	Transfer	Summer	€0.01 million	
12	FW	(Italy)	Nicolao Dumitru	22	EU	Veria (Greece)	Loan	Summer	N/A	
	MF	(Italy)	Giuseppe Fornito	19	EU	Cosenza	Loan	Summer	N/A	
	DF	(Italy)	Daniele Celiento	20	EU	Pistoiese	Loan	Summer	N/A	
	GK	(Italy)	Luigi Sepe	23	EU	Empoli	Loan	Summer	N/A	
27	DF	(Colombia)	Pablo Armero	27	Non-EU	Udinese	Ownership Resolved	Summer	Undisclosed	
	DF	(Italy)	Giuseppe Nicolao	20	EU	Alessandria	Loan	Summer	N/A	
	GK	(Italy)	Emanuele Allegra	20	EU	Pontedera	Loan	Summer	N/A	
	MF	(Italy)	Jacopo Dezi	22	EU	Crotone	Co-Ownership	Summer	Undisclosed	
	DF	(Italy)	Daniele Donnarumma	22	EU	Messina	Released	Summer	N/A	
2	DF	(France)	Anthony Réveillère	34	EU		Released	Summer	Free	
80	GK	(Spain)	Toni Doblas	34	EU		Released	Summer	Free	
13	MF	(Italy)	Davide Bariti	23	EU		Released	Summer	Free	

Last updated: 29 August 2014
EU = if holds or not a European Union passport; Country: when 2 flags, 1st flag = country that plays for internationally, 2nd flag = country of birth; N = number on jersey; P = Position (for position name, pause mouse pointer on abbreviation); Name = Name on jersey (for more extensive name, pause mouse pointer on name); Age = age on the day of the signing; Moving from = only indicate the club the player was playing before start playing for this club in this season, for the type of the moving see Status column; Moving to = only indicates the club the player is going to play next, for the type of the moving see Status column; Ends = when the player's current contract ends; n/a = Not applicable.

== Competitions ==
=== Supercoppa Italiana ===
23 December 2014	Juventus	2–2 (a.e.t.) (5–6 p)	Napoli	Doha, Qatar
17:30 GMT	Tevez 5', 106', (yellow card) 109'; Pereyra (yellow card) 69'	Report	Higuaín (yellow card) 45+1', (goal) 68', 118'; Callejón (yellow card) 76'; Albiol (yellow card) 80'; Mertens (yellow card) 83'; Ghoulam (yellow card) 105'	Stadium: Jassim Bin Hamad Stadium; Attendance: 14,000; Referee: Paolo Valeri
	Penalties
	Tevez (penalty missed); Vidal (penalty scored); Pogba (penalty scored); Marchisio (penalty scored); Morata (penalty scored); Bonucci (penalty scored); Chiellini (penalty missed); Pereyra (penalty missed); Padoin (penalty missed)		(penalty missed) Jorginho; (penalty scored) Ghoulam; (penalty scored) Albiol; (penalty scored) Inler; (penalty scored) Higuaín; (penalty scored) Gargano; (penalty missed) Mertens; (penalty missed) Callejón; (penalty scored) Koulibaly

=== Serie A ===
==== League table ====
Pos	Team	Pld	W	D	L	GF	GA	GD	Pts	Qualification or relegation
3	Lazio	38	21	6	11	71	38	+33	69	Qualification for the Champions League play-off round
4	Fiorentina	38	18	10	10	61	46	+15	64	Qualification for the Europa League group stage (Note: Since the winners of the 2014–15 Coppa Italia (Juventus) qualified for European competition based on league position, the spot awarded to the cup winners (Europa League group stage) was passed to the fifth-placed team and the spot originally meant for the fifth-placed team (Europa League third qualifying round) was given to the highest placed team that has obtained an UEFA licence and not already qualified for European competition.)
5	Napoli	38	18	9	11	70	54	+16	63	Qualification for the Europa League group stage
6	Genoa (Note: Genoa failed to obtain a UEFA licence from Italian Football Federation. Therefore, they were barred to participate in European competitions. Genoa appealed the decision, but the appeal was denied.)	38	16	11	11	62	47	+15	59	
7	Sampdoria	38	13	17	8	48	42	+6	56	Qualification for the Europa League third qualifying round

Source: 2014–15 Serie A, 2014-15 Serie A classification.
Rules for classification: 1) points; 2) head-to-head points; 3) head-to-head goal difference; 4) goal difference; 5) number of goals scored; 6) draw. (Head-to-head record is applied for clubs with the same number of points only once all matches between said clubs have been played.).

==== Results summary ====
Overall								Home						Away					
Pld	W	D	L	GF	GA	GD	Pts	W	D	L	GF	GA	GD	W	D	L	GF	GA	GD
38	18	9	11	70	54	+16	63	11	5	3	46	28	+18	7	4	8	24	26	−2

Last updated: 31 May 2015.
Source: Competitive matches

==== Results by round ====
Round	1	2	3	4	5	6	7	8	9	10	11	12	13	14	15	16	17	18	19	20	21	22	23	24	25	26	27	28	29	30	31	32	33	34	35	36	37	38
Ground	A	H	A	H	A	H	A	H	A	H	A	H	A	H	A	H	A	H	A	H	A	H	A	H	A	H	A	H	A	H	A	H	A	H	A	H	A	H
Result	W	L	L	D	W	W	D	W	D	W	W	D	D	D	L	W	W	L	W	W	W	W	L	W	L	D	L	D	L	W	W	W	L	W	D	W	L	L
Position	4	9	15	10	8	7	7	7	7	5	3	3	3	5	7	4	4	4	3	3	3	3	3	3	3	4	4	5	6	4	4	4	4	4	4	4	4	5

Updated to match(es) played on 31 May 2015. Source: Competitive matches
A = Away; H = Home; W = Win; D = Draw; L = Loss

==== Matches ====
31 August 2014 1	Genoa	1–2	Napoli	Genoa
20:45 CEST (UTC+02:00)	Pinilla 40'; Marchese (yellow card) 53'; Sturaro (yellow card) 55'; Ragusa (yellow card) 80'	Report	Callejón 3'; Albiol (yellow card) 77'; De Guzmán 90+5'	Stadium: Stadio Luigi Ferraris; Attendance: 21,963; Referee: Luca Banti

14 September 2014 2	Napoli	0–1	Chievo	Naples
15:00 CEST (UTC+02:00)	Maggio (yellow card) 16'; Inler (yellow card) 90'	Report	Cesar (yellow card) 26'; Dainelli (yellow card) 33'; López 49'	Stadium: Stadio San Paolo; Attendance: 35,251; Referee: Piero Giacomelli

21 September 2014 3	Udinese	1–0	Napoli	Udine
18:00 CEST (UTC+02:00)	Fernandes (yellow card) 49'; Danilo 70'	Report	López (yellow card) 54'; Albiol (yellow card) 84'; Callejón (yellow card) 90'	Stadium: Stadio Friuli; Attendance: 8,833; Referee: Paolo Tagliavento

24 September 2014 4	Napoli	3–3	Palermo	Naples
20:45 CEST (UTC+02:00)	Koulibaly 2', (yellow card) 31'; Zapata 11'; Callejón 45+1'	Report	Belotti 18', 61'; Vázquez 24'; Morganella (yellow card) 33'; João Silva (yellow card) 66'; Bamba (yellow card) 73'; Terzi (yellow card) 90+6'	Stadium: Stadio San Paolo; Attendance: 18,521; Referee: Daniele Doveri

28 September 2014 5	Sassuolo	0–1	Napoli	Reggio Emilia
12:30 CEST (UTC+02:00)	Brighi (yellow card) 23'; Taïder (yellow card) 52'; Zaza (yellow card) 55'; Gazzola (yellow card) 75'	Report	Callejón 28'; Gargano (yellow card) 52'; Jorginho (yellow card) 78'	Stadium: Mapei Stadium – Città del Tricolore; Attendance: 13,935; Referee: Sebastiano Peruzzo

5 October 2014 6	Napoli	2–1	Torino	Naples
20:45 CEST (UTC+02:00)	Gargano (yellow card) 34'; Michu (yellow card) 41'; Insigne 55'; Callejón 72'; Maggio (yellow card) 84'	Report	Benassi (yellow card) 12'; Quagliarella 14', (yellow card) 70'; Vives (yellow card) 43'; El Kaddouri (red card) 90+5'; Glik (red card) 90+5'	Stadium: Stadio San Paolo; Attendance: 23,586; Referee: Davide Massa

19 October 2014 7	Internazionale	2–2	Napoli	Milan
20:45 CEST (UTC+02:00)	Hernanes (yellow card) 37', (goal) 90+1'; Guarín 82'; Juan Jesus (yellow card) 85'	Report	Britos (yellow card) 45'; Higuaín (yellow card) 70'; Jorginho (yellow card) 73'; Callejón 79', 90'	Stadium: San Siro; Attendance: 40,383; Referee: Daniele Orsato

26 October 2014 8	Napoli	6–2	Hellas Verona	Naples
18:00 CET (UTC+01:00)	Jorginho (yellow card) 24'; Hamšík 44', 58'; Higuaín 68', 84', 90+1' (pen.); Callejón 76'	Report	Hallfreðsson 1'; Ioniță (yellow card) 55'; López 66'	Stadium: Stadio San Paolo; Attendance: 25,992; Referee: Andrea Gervasoni

29 October 2014 9	Atalanta	1–1	Napoli	Bergamo
20:45 CET (UTC+01:00)	Benalouane (yellow card) 10'; Denis 57'; Cigarini (yellow card) 63' (yellow-red card) 83'; Raimondi (yellow card) 66'; Stendardo (yellow card) 90+1'	Report	Ghoulam (yellow card) 45'; Mertens (yellow card) 67'; Higuaín 86'	Stadium: Stadio Atleti Azzurri d'Italia; Attendance: 14,882; Referee: Antonio Damato

1 November 2014 10	Napoli	2–0	Roma	Naples
15:00 CET (UTC+01:00)	Higuaín 3'; Maggio (yellow card) 40'; López (yellow card) 68'; Callejón 85'	Report	Holebas (yellow card) 26'; Florenzi (yellow card) 41'; Nainggolan (yellow card) 73'	Stadium: Stadio San Paolo; Attendance: 30,157; Referee: Paolo Tagliavento

9 November 2014 11	Fiorentina	0–1	Napoli	Florence
18:00 CET (UTC+01:00)	Iličić (yellow card) 38'; Savić (yellow card) 54'; Cuadrado (yellow card) 90+3'	Report	Koulibaly (yellow card) 32'; Jorginho (yellow card) 56'; Higuaín 61'; Henrique (yellow card) 90+1'	Stadium: Stadio Artemio Franchi; Attendance: 31,987; Referee: Paolo Valeri

23 November 2014 12	Napoli	3–3	Cagliari	Naples
15:00 CET (UTC+01:00)	Higuaín 11'; Inler 30'; Koulibaly (yellow card) 59'; De Guzmán 62'	Report	Ibarbo 38'; Farias (yellow card) 44', (goal) 47', 68'; Pisano (yellow card) 55'	Stadium: Stadio San Paolo; Attendance: 45,413; Referee: Dino Tommasi

1 December 2014 13	Sampdoria	1–1	Napoli	Genoa
21:00 CET (UTC+01:00)	Obiang (yellow card) 19'; Soriano (yellow card) 23'; Romagnoli (yellow card) 53'; Éder 57', (yellow card) 59'	Report	Britos (yellow card) 7'; Koulibaly (yellow card) 35' (yellow-red card) 85'; Inler (yellow card) 56'; Zapata 90+2'	Stadium: Stadio Luigi Ferraris; Attendance: 21,033; Referee: Gianluca Rocchi

7 December 2014 14	Napoli	2–2	Empoli	Naples
12:30 CET (UTC+01:00)	Maggio (yellow card) 63'; Zapata 67'; Albiol (yellow card) 69'; De Guzmán 72'	Report	Verdi 19'; Rugani 53'; Laxalt (yellow card) 63'; Mário Rui (yellow card) 73'	Stadium: Stadio San Paolo; Attendance: 30,128; Referee: Angelo Cervellera

14 December 2014 15	Milan	2–0	Napoli	Milan
20:45 CET (UTC+01:00)	Ménez 6'; Montolivo (yellow card) 20'; Bonera (yellow card) 45'; Bonaventura 52'; Poli (yellow card) 64'	Report	Ghoulam (yellow card) 45'; Albiol (yellow card) 58'	Stadium: San Siro; Attendance: 35,867; Referee: Antonio Damato

18 December 2014 16	Napoli	2–0	Parma	Naples
21:00 CET (UTC+01:00)	Zapata 19'; Mertens 30' (pen.); Britos (yellow card) 48'	Report	Gobbi (yellow card) 30'; Galloppa (yellow card) 35'; Santacroce (yellow card) 46'; Mendes (yellow card) 82'	Stadium: Stadio San Paolo; Attendance: 20,799; Referee: Marco Di Bello

6 January 2015 17	Cesena	1–4	Napoli	Cesena
18:00 CET (UTC+01:00)	Capelli (yellow card) 61'; Brienza 75'; Zé Eduardo (yellow card) 83'	Report	Callejón 29'; Gargano (yellow card) 37'; Higuaín 41', 72'; Henrique (yellow card) 53'; Capelli 64' (o.g.)	Stadium: Stadio Dino Manuzzi; Attendance: 16,275; Referee: Davide Massa

11 January 2015 18	Napoli	1–3	Juventus	Naples
20:45 CET (UTC+01:00)	Britos 64', (yellow card) 68'; De Guzmán (yellow card) 85'; Albiol (yellow card) 90+1'; Zapata (yellow card) 90+2'	Report	Pogba 29'; Tevez (yellow card) 39'; Cáceres (yellow card) 61', (goal) 69'; Vidal 90+4'	Stadium: Stadio San Paolo; Attendance: 53,006; Referee: Paolo Tagliavento

18 January 2015 19	Lazio	0–1	Napoli	Rome
12:30 CET (UTC+01:00)	Ledesma (yellow card) 16'; Parolo (yellow card) 43'; Keita (yellow card) 70'	Report	Higuaín 18'; López (yellow card) 32'; Mertens (yellow card) 58'; Gargano (yellow card) 78'	Stadium: Stadio Olimpico; Attendance: 26,857; Referee: Nicola Rizzoli

26 January 2015 20	Napoli	2–1	Genoa	Naples
21:00 CET (UTC+01:00)	Higuaín 7', 75' (pen.); Albiol (yellow card) 25'; Koulibaly (yellow card) 81'; Inler (yellow card) 88'	Report	Bertolacci (yellow card) 40'; Falque 56'; Perotti (yellow card) 60'; Antonelli (yellow card) 61'; Kucka (yellow card) 80'; Niang (yellow card) 90+1'	Stadium: Stadio San Paolo; Attendance: 30,821; Referee: Gianpaolo Calvarese

1 February 2015 21	Chievo	1–2	Napoli	Verona
15:00 CET (UTC+01:00)	Britos 25' (o.g.); Botta (yellow card) 63'	Report	Cesar 18' (o.g.); Gabbiadini 62'	Stadium: Stadio Marc'Antonio Bentegodi; Attendance: 11,000; Referee: Luca Banti

8 February 2015 22	Napoli	3–1	Udinese	Naples
15:00 CET (UTC+01:00)	Mertens 8', (yellow card) 38'; Gabbiadini 21'; Théréau 59' (o.g.); Higuaín (yellow card) 81'	Report	Hallberg (yellow card) 1'; Allan (yellow card) 11'; Théréau 27'; Pasquale (yellow card) 68'; Heurtaux (yellow card) 85'	Stadium: Stadio San Paolo; Attendance: 28,773; Referee: Paolo Mazzoleni

14 February 2015 23	Palermo	3–1	Napoli	Palermo
20:45 CET (UTC+01:00)	Lazaar 14'; Vázquez 36'; Rispoli (yellow card) 53'; Rigoni (yellow card) 59', (goal) 65'; Bolzoni (yellow card) 82'	Report	Jorginho (yellow card) 7'; Higuaín (yellow card) 41'; Gabbiadini 82'	Stadium: Stadio Renzo Barbera; Attendance: 12,784; Referee: Paolo Mazzoleni

23 February 2015 24	Napoli	2–0	Sassuolo	Naples
19:00 CET (UTC+01:00)	Maggio (yellow card) 34'; Gargano (yellow card) 55'; Zapata 61', (yellow card) 65'; Hamšík 70'; Mertens (red card) 72'	Report	Bianco (yellow card) 38'; Magnanelli (yellow card) 50'	Stadium: Stadio San Paolo; Attendance: 46,925; Referee: Davide Massa

1 March 2015 25	Torino	1–0	Napoli	Turin
20:45 CET (UTC+01:00)	El Kaddouri (yellow card) 29'; Glik 68'; Quagliarella (yellow card) 72'	Report	Gargano (yellow card) 34'; Koulibaly (yellow card) 71'; Maggio (yellow card) 82'	Stadium: Stadio Olimpico di Torino; Attendance: 20,274; Referee: Massimiliano Irrati

8 March 2015 26	Napoli	2–2	Internazionale	Naples
20:45 CET (UTC+01:00)	Mertens (yellow card) 15'; Henrique (yellow card) 49' (yellow-red card) 86'; Hamšík 51'; Higuaín 63'	Report	Juan Jesus (yellow card) 1'; Brozović (yellow card) 37'; Palacio 72'; Icardi 87' (pen.); Guarín (yellow card) 89'	Stadium: Stadio San Paolo; Attendance: 36,646; Referee: Gianluca Rocchi

15 March 2015 27	Hellas Verona	2–0	Napoli	Verona
18:00 CET (UTC+01:00)	Toni 7', 51', (yellow card) 90+4'; Sala (yellow card) 26' (yellow-red card) 89'; Juanito (yellow card) 44'; Obbadi (yellow card) 71'; Tachtsidis (yellow card) 72'; Christodoulopoulos (yellow card) 79'	Report	Ghoulam (yellow card) 9'; Mesto (yellow card) 52'; Albiol (yellow card) 57'; Gabbiadini (yellow card) 89'; Britos (yellow card) 90+4'	Stadium: Stadio Marc'Antonio Bentegodi; Attendance: 22,468; Referee: Luca Banti

22 March 2015 28	Napoli	1–1	Atalanta	Naples
20:45 CET (UTC+01:00)	Britos (yellow card) 23'; Higuaín (yellow card) 78'; Zapata 89'; Maggio (yellow card) 90+3'; Inler (yellow card) 90+3'	Report	Zappacosta (yellow card) 32'; Gómez (yellow card) 34' (yellow-red card) 55'; Denis (yellow card) 57'; Pinilla 72', (yellow card) 90+1'; Sportiello (yellow card) 90+5'	Stadium: Stadio San Paolo; Attendance: 30,820; Referee: Gianpaolo Calvarese

4 April 2015 29	Roma	1–0	Napoli	Rome
12:30 CEST (UTC+02:00)	De Rossi (yellow card) 11'; Holebas (yellow card) 21'; Pjanić 25'; Florenzi (yellow card) 55'; Torosidis (yellow card) 72'	Report	Albiol (yellow card) 32'	Stadium: Stadio Olimpico; Attendance: 34,425; Referee: Nicola Rizzoli

12 April 2015 30	Napoli	3–0	Fiorentina	Naples
15:00 CEST (UTC+02:00)	Mertens 23'; Koulibaly (yellow card) 42'; Strinić (yellow card) 63'; Hamšík 71'; López (yellow card) 81'; Callejón 89'	Report	Vargas (yellow card) 42'	Stadium: Stadio San Paolo; Attendance: 21,804; Referee: Antonio Damato

19 April 2015 31	Cagliari	0–3	Napoli	Cagliari
18:00 CEST (UTC+02:00)	Conti (yellow card) 44'; Longo (yellow card) 61'; Rossettini (yellow card) 64'; Ceppitelli (yellow card) 69'	Report	Koulibaly (yellow card) 4'; Maggio (yellow card) 11' (yellow-red card) 65'; Callejón 24'; Balzano 45+1' (o.g.); Gabbiadini 59'	Stadium: Stadio Sant'Elia; Attendance: 8,000; Referee: Paolo Valeri

26 April 2015 32	Napoli	4–2	Sampdoria	Naples
20:45 CEST (UTC+02:00)	Britos (yellow card) 3'; Gabbiadini 31'; Higuaín 34', 81' (pen.); Insigne 47'	Report	Albiol 12' (o.g.); Mesbah (yellow card) 24'; Muriel 89', (yellow card) 90'	Stadium: Stadio San Paolo; Attendance: 22,299; Referee: Daniele Doveri

30 April 2015 33	Empoli	4–2	Napoli	Empoli
20:45 CEST (UTC+02:00)	Maccarone 8'; Laurini (yellow card) 15'; Britos 43' (o.g.); Saponara 45+1'; Tonelli (yellow card) 71'; Albiol 81' (o.g.); Verdi (yellow card) 90+1'	Report	Ghoulam (yellow card) 24'; Laurini 64' (o.g.); Higuaín (yellow card) 79'; Hamšík 90+1'	Stadium: Stadio Carlo Castellani; Attendance: 10,116; Referee: Davide Massa

3 May 2015 34	Napoli	3–0	Milan	Naples
20:45 CEST (UTC+02:00)	Albiol (yellow card) 65'; Hamšík 70', (yellow card) 71'; Higuaín 74'; Gabbiadini 76'	Report	De Sciglio (red card) 1'	Stadium: Stadio San Paolo; Attendance: 25,469; Referee: Paolo Mazzoleni

10 May 2015 35	Parma	2–2	Napoli	Parma
18:00 CEST (UTC+02:00)	Palladino 9'; Mendes (yellow card) 22'; Jorquera 33'; Lila (yellow card) 52'	Report	Gabbiadini 28'; Mertens 72'; Albiol (yellow card) 82'	Stadium: Stadio Ennio Tardini; Attendance: 13,172; Referee: Piero Giacomelli

18 May 2015 36	Napoli	3–2	Cesena	Naples
21:00 CEST (UTC+02:00)	Mertens 19', 57'; Gabbiadini 21'; Ghoulam (yellow card) 42'; Koulibaly (yellow card) 72'	Report	Volta (yellow card) 6'; Defrel 15', 45+2'; Capelli (yellow card) 71'	Stadium: Stadio San Paolo; Attendance: 37,568; Referee: Massimiliano Irrati

23 May 2015 37	Juventus	3–1	Napoli	Turin
18:00 CEST (UTC+02:00)	Pereyra 13'; Asamoah (yellow card) 49'; Sturaro 77'; Morata (yellow card) 90+2'; Pepe 90+3' (pen.)	Report	López 50'; Ghoulam (yellow card) 83'; Britos (red card) 90+2'	Stadium: Juventus Stadium; Attendance: 40,485; Referee: Luca Banti

31 May 2015 38	Napoli	2–4	Lazio	Naples
20:45 CEST (UTC+02:00)	Higuaín 55', 64'; Ghoulam (yellow card) 67' (yellow-red card) 71'; Andújar (yellow card) 85'	Report	Đorđević (yellow card) 19'; Parolo 33', (yellow card) 55' (yellow-red card) 62'; Maurício (yellow card) 43'; Candreva 45+1', (yellow card) 88'; Lulić (yellow card) 75'; Onazi 85'; Klose 90+2'	Stadium: Stadio San Paolo; Attendance: 49,085; Referee: Gianluca Rocchi

=== Coppa Italia ===
22 January 2015 Round of 16	Napoli	2–2 (a.e.t.) (5–4 p)	Udinese	Naples
21:00 CET (UTC+01:00)	Jorginho 65' (pen.), (yellow card) 69'; Mesto (yellow card) 94'; Strinić (yellow card) 97'; Hamšík 99'	Report	Gabriel Silva (yellow card) 3'; Hallberg (yellow card) 9'; Théréau (yellow card) 28', (goal) 58'; Widmer (yellow card) 44' (yellow-red card) 68'; Heurtaux (yellow card) 63'; Kone 104'	Stadium: Stadio San Paolo; Attendance: 10,847; Referee: Daniele Orsato
	Penalties
	De Guzmán (penalty scored); Jorginho (penalty scored); Mesto (penalty scored); Hamšík (penalty scored); Higuaín (penalty scored)		(penalty scored) Fernandes; (penalty scored) Guilherme; (penalty scored) Kone; (penalty scored) Danilo; (penalty missed) Allan

4 February 2015 Quarter-finals	Napoli	1–0	Internazionale	Naples
20:45 CET (UTC+01:00)	Gargano (yellow card) 56'; Higuaín 90+3'	Report	Shaqiri (yellow card) 22'; Juan Jesus (yellow card) 39'; Medel (yellow card) 56'; Pușcaș (yellow card) 64'; Ranocchia (yellow card) 90+1'	Stadium: Stadio San Paolo; Attendance: 45,000; Referee: Davide Massa

4 March 2015 Semi-finals; First leg	Lazio	1–1	Napoli	Rome
20:45 CET (UTC+01:00)	Klose 33', (yellow card) 66'; Basta (yellow card) 53'; Keita (yellow card) 79'	Report	Britos (yellow card) 21'; Mesto (yellow card) 54'; Gabbiadini 58', (yellow card) 60'; Albiol (yellow card) 65'; Inler (yellow card) 83'	Stadium: Stadio Olimpico; Attendance: 27,000; Referee: Antonio Damato

8 April 2015 Semi-finals; Second leg	Napoli	0–1 (1–2 agg.)	Lazio	Naples
20:45 CEST (UTC+02:00)	Albiol (yellow card) 32'; De Guzmán (yellow card) 85'	Report	Maurício (yellow card) 49'; Lulić 79'; Parolo (yellow card) 90+2'	Stadium: Stadio San Paolo; Attendance: 46,477; Referee: Daniele Orsato

=== UEFA Champions League ===
==== Play-off round ====
19 August 2014 First leg	Napoli (Italy)	1–1	(Spain) Athletic Bilbao	Naples, Italy
20:45 CEST (UTC+02:00)	Jorginho (yellow card) 10'; Higuaín 68'	Report	Muniain 41'; Gurpegui (yellow card) 72'; Balenziaga (yellow card) 75'	Stadium: Stadio San Paolo; Attendance: 49,872; Referee: Jonas Eriksson (Sweden)

27 August 2014 Second leg	Athletic Bilbao (Spain)	3–1 (4–2 agg.)	(Italy) Napoli	Bilbao, Spain
20:45 CEST (UTC+02:00)	Susaeta (yellow card) 30'; Aduriz 61', 69'; Ibai 74'	Report	Ghoulam (yellow card) 39'; Higuaín (yellow card) 43'; Hamšík 47'; Gargano (yellow card) 87'	Stadium: San Mamés; Attendance: 49,017; Referee: Cüneyt Çakır (Turkey)

=== UEFA Europa League ===
==== Group stage ====
Pos	Team	Pld	W	D	L	GF	GA	GD	Pts	Qualification	NAP	YB	SPA	SLO
1	(Italy) Napoli	6	4	1	1	11	3	+8	13	Advance to knockout phase	—	3–0	3–1	3–0
2	(Switzerland) Young Boys	6	4	0	2	13	7	+6	12	Advance to knockout phase	2–0	—	2–0	5–0
3	(Czech Republic) Sparta Prague	6	3	1	2	11	6	+5	10		0–0	3–1	—	4–0
4	(Slovakia) Slovan Bratislava	6	0	0	6	1	20	−19	0		0–2	1–3	0–3	—

Source: Soccerway
Rules for classification: Group stage tiebreakers

18 September 2014 1	Napoli (Italy)	3–1	(Czech Republic) Sparta Prague	Naples, Italy
21:05 CEST (UTC+02:00)	Higuaín 23' (pen.); Mertens 51', 81', (yellow card) 66'	Report	Hušbauer 14'; Nhamoinesu (yellow card) 23'; Bednář (yellow card) 90+4'	Stadium: Stadio San Paolo; Attendance: 18,000; Referee: Kevin Blom (Netherlands)

2 October 2014 2	Slovan Bratislava (Slovakia)	0–2	(Italy) Napoli	Bratislava, Slovakia
19:00 CEST (UTC+02:00)	Kubík (yellow card) 55'	Report	Hamšík 35'; Higuaín 74'	Stadium: Štadión Pasienky; Attendance: 10,738; Referee: Marijo Strahonja (Croatia)

23 October 2014 3	Young Boys (Switzerland)	2–0	(Italy) Napoli	Bern, Switzerland
19:00 CEST (UTC+02:00)	Vilotić (yellow card) 30'; Sanogo (yellow card) 49'; Hoarau 52'; Lecjaks (yellow card) 55'; Bertone 90+2'	Report	Jorginho (yellow card) 67'; Ghoulam (yellow card) 72'	Stadium: Stade de Suisse; Attendance: 28,000; Referee: Ruddy Buquet (France)

6 November 2014 4	Napoli (Italy)	3–0	(Switzerland) Young Boys	Naples, Italy
21:05 CET (UTC+01:00)	De Guzmán 45+2', 65', 83'	Report		Stadium: Stadio San Paolo; Attendance: 25,000; Referee: Kenn Hansen (Denmark)

27 November 2014 5	Sparta Prague (Czech Republic)	0–0	(Italy) Napoli	Prague, Czech Republic
19:00 CET (UTC+01:00)	Matějovský (yellow card) 46'; Brabec (yellow card) 62'; Dočkal (yellow card) 90'	Report	Britos (yellow card) 6'	Stadium: Generali Arena; Attendance: 16,111; Referee: Andre Marriner (England)

11 December 2014 6	Napoli (Italy)	3–0	(Slovakia) Slovan Bratislava	Naples, Italy
21:05 CET (UTC+01:00)	Mertens 6'; Hamšík 16'; Zapata 75'	Report	Hudák (yellow card) 44'	Stadium: Stadio San Paolo; Attendance: 6,490; Referee: Aleksandar Stavrev (Macedonia)

==== Knockout phase ====
===== Round of 32 =====
19 February 2015 First leg	Trabzonspor (Turkey)	0–4	(Italy) Napoli	Trabzon, Turkey
19:00 CET (UTC+01:00)	Atık (yellow card) 36'; Demir (yellow card) 40'	Report	Henrique 6'; Higuaín 20'; Gabbiadini 27'; Inler (yellow card) 64'; Zapata 90+2'	Stadium: Hüseyin Avni Aker Stadium; Attendance: 21,096; Referee: Vladislav Bezborodov (Russia)

26 February 2015 Second leg	Napoli (Italy)	1–0 (5–0 agg.)	(Turkey) Trabzonspor	Naples, Italy
21:05 CET (UTC+01:00)	De Guzmán 19'	Report	Ekici (yellow card) 41'; Arıkan (yellow card) 57'; Hurmacı (yellow card) 82'	Stadium: Stadio San Paolo; Attendance: 14,410; Referee: Ivan Bebek (Croatia)

===== Round of 16 =====
12 March 2015 First leg	Napoli (Italy)	3–1	(Russia) Dynamo Moscow	Naples, Italy
21:05 CET (UTC+01:00)	Higuaín 25', 31' (pen.), 55'; Ghoulam (yellow card) 28'	Report	Kurányi 2'; Valbuena (yellow card) 30'; Zobnin (yellow card) 32' (yellow-red card) 46'; Dzsudzsák (yellow card) 41'; Hubočan (yellow card) 78'; Samba (yellow card) 80'	Stadium: Stadio San Paolo; Attendance: 17,727; Referee: Anastasios Sidiropoulos (Greece)

19 March 2015 Second leg	Dynamo Moscow (Russia)	0–0 (1–3 agg.)	(Italy) Napoli	Khimki, Russia
18:00 CET (UTC+01:00)	Vainqueur (yellow card) 72'	Report	Maggio (yellow card) 42'; Mertens (yellow card) 53'	Stadium: Arena Khimki; Attendance: 17,356; Referee: Bas Nijhuis (Netherlands)

===== Quarter-finals =====
16 April 2015 First leg	Wolfsburg (Germany)	1–4	(Italy) Napoli	Wolfsburg, Germany
21:05 CEST (UTC+02:00)	Bendtner 80', (yellow card) 80'	Report	Higuaín 15'; Hamšík 23', 64'; Gabbiadini 77'	Stadium: Volkswagen Arena; Attendance: 25,112; Referee: Antonio Mateu Lahoz (Spain)

23 April 2015 Second leg	Napoli (Italy)	2–2 (6–3 agg.)	(Germany) Wolfsburg	Naples, Italy
21:05 CEST (UTC+02:00)	Callejón 50'; Mertens 65'	Report	Klose 71'; Perišić 73'	Stadium: Stadio San Paolo; Attendance: 27,262; Referee: Cüneyt Çakır (Turkey)

===== Semi-finals =====
7 May 2015 First leg	Napoli (Italy)	1–1	(Ukraine) Dnipro Dnipropetrovsk	Naples, Italy
21:05 CEST (UTC+02:00)	López 50'	Report	Kankava (yellow card) 24'; Fedetskyi (yellow card) 73'; Seleznyov 81'	Stadium: Stadio San Paolo; Attendance: 41,095; Referee: Svein Oddvar Moen (Norway)

14 May 2015 Second leg	Dnipro Dnipropetrovsk (Ukraine)	1–0 (2–1 agg.)	(Italy) Napoli	Kyiv, Ukraine
21:05 CEST (UTC+02:00)	Léo Matos (yellow card) 23'; Fedetskyi (yellow card) 44'; Seleznyov 58', (yellow card) 70'; Kankava (yellow card) 75'; Matheus (yellow card) 85'; Boyko (yellow card) 90+5'	Report	Gabbiadini (yellow card) 27'; Ghoulam (yellow card) 81'; Callejón (yellow card) 86'	Stadium: Olympic Stadium; Attendance: 17,356; Referee: Milorad Mažić (Serbia)

== Statistics ==
=== Appearances and goals ===
No.	Pos	Nat	Player	Total		Serie A		Supercoppa Italiana		Coppa Italia		Europe	
No.	Pos	Nat	Player	Apps	Goals	Apps	Goals	Apps	Goals	Apps	Goals	Apps	Goals
Goalkeepers
1	GK	(Brazil) BRA	Rafael	26	0	23	0	1	0	0	0	2	0
15	GK	(Italy) ITA	Roberto Colombo	0	0	0	0	0	0	0	0	0	0
45	GK	(Argentina) ARG	Mariano Andújar	15	0	15	0	0	0	0	0	0	0
83	GK	(Italy) ITA	Antonio Rosati	0	0	0	0	0	0	0	0	0	0
Defenders
3	DF	(Croatia) CRO	Ivan Strinić	9	0	9	0	0	0	0	0	0	0
4	DF	(Brazil) BRA	Henrique	11	0	9+2	0	0	0	0	0	0	0
5	DF	(Uruguay) URU	Miguel Britos	21	1	17+2	1	0	0	0	0	1+1	0
11	DF	(Italy) ITA	Christian Maggio	32	0	29	0	1	0	0	0	2	0
16	DF	(Italy) ITA	Giandomenico Mesto	7	0	3+4	0	0	0	0	0	0	0
18	DF	(Colombia) COL	Juan Zúñiga	7	0	6+1	0	0	0	0	0	0	0
26	DF	(France) FRA	Kalidou Koulibaly	30	1	27	1	1	0	0	0	2	0
31	DF	(Algeria) ALG	Faouzi Ghoulam	23	0	20+1	0	1	0	0	0	1	0
33	DF	(Spain) ESP	Raúl Albiol	38	0	34+1	0	1	0	0	0	2	0
96	DF	(Italy) ITA	Sebastiano Luperto	1	0	0+1	0	0	0	0	0	0	0
Midfielders
6	MF	(Netherlands) NED	Jonathan de Guzmán	24	3	12+11	3	1	0	0	0	0	0
8	MF	(Brazil) BRA	Jorginho	26	0	14+9	0	0+1	0	0	0	2	0
17	MF	(Slovakia) SVK	Marek Hamšík	38	8	28+7	7	1	0	0	0	2	1
19	MF	(Spain) ESP	David López	33	1	29+3	1	1	0	0	0	0	0
20	MF	(Switzerland) SUI	Blerim Džemaili	0	0	0	0	0	0	0	0	0	0
22	MF	(Croatia) CRO	Josip Radošević	0	0	0	0	0	0	0	0	0	0
77	MF	(Uruguay) URU	Walter Gargano	27	0	17+7	0	1	0	0	0	2	0
88	MF	(Switzerland) SUI	Gökhan Inler	20	1	16+3	1	0+1	0	0	0	0	0
Forwards
7	FW	(Spain) ESP	José Callejón	41	11	33+5	11	1	0	0	0	2	0
9	FW	(Argentina) ARG	Gonzalo Higuaín	40	20	31+6	18	1	2	0	0	2	0
14	FW	(Belgium) BEL	Dries Mertens	34	6	17+14	6	0+1	0	0	0	1+1	0
21	FW	(Spain) ESP	Michu	4	0	2+1	0	0	0	0	0	0+1	0
23	FW	(Italy) ITA	Manolo Gabbiadini	20	8	8+12	8	0	0	0	0	0	0
24	FW	(Italy) ITA	Lorenzo Insigne	22	2	13+7	2	0	0	0	0	1+1	0
91	FW	(Colombia) COL	Duván Zapata	22	6	6+15	6	0	0	0	0	0+1	0
Players transferred out during the season

Last updated: 31 May 2015
Source: Competitions

=== Goalscorers ===
Rank	No.	Pos	Nat	Name	Serie A	Supercoppa	Coppa Italia	UEFA CL	UEFA EL	Total
1	9	FW	(Argentina)	Gonzalo Higuaín	18	2	1	1	7	29
2	17	MF	(Slovakia)	Marek Hamšík	7	0	1	1	4	13
3	7	FW	(Spain)	José Callejón	11	0	0	0	1	12
4	23	FW	(Italy)	Manolo Gabbiadini	8	0	1	0	2	11
5	14	FW	(Belgium)	Dries Mertens	6	0	0	0	4	10
6	91	FW	(Colombia)	Duván Zapata	6	0	0	0	2	8
7	6	MF	(Netherlands)	Jonathan de Guzmán	3	0	0	0	4	7
8	19	MF	(Spain)	David López	1	0	0	0	1	2
8	24	FW	(Italy)	Lorenzo Insigne	2	0	0	0	0	2
10	4	DF	(Brazil)	Henrique	0	0	0	0	1	1
10	5	DF	(Uruguay)	Miguel Britos	1	0	0	0	0	1
10	8	MF	(Italy)	Jorginho	0	0	1	0	0	1
10	26	DF	(France)	Kalidou Koulibaly	1	0	0	0	0	1
10	88	MF	(Switzerland)	Gökhan Inler	1	0	0	0	0	1
Own goal					5	0	0	0	0	5
Total					70	2	4	2	26	104

Last updated: 31 May 2015
