= Nicolò Barella =

Italian football player (born 1997)

Nicolò Barella Cavaliere OMRI
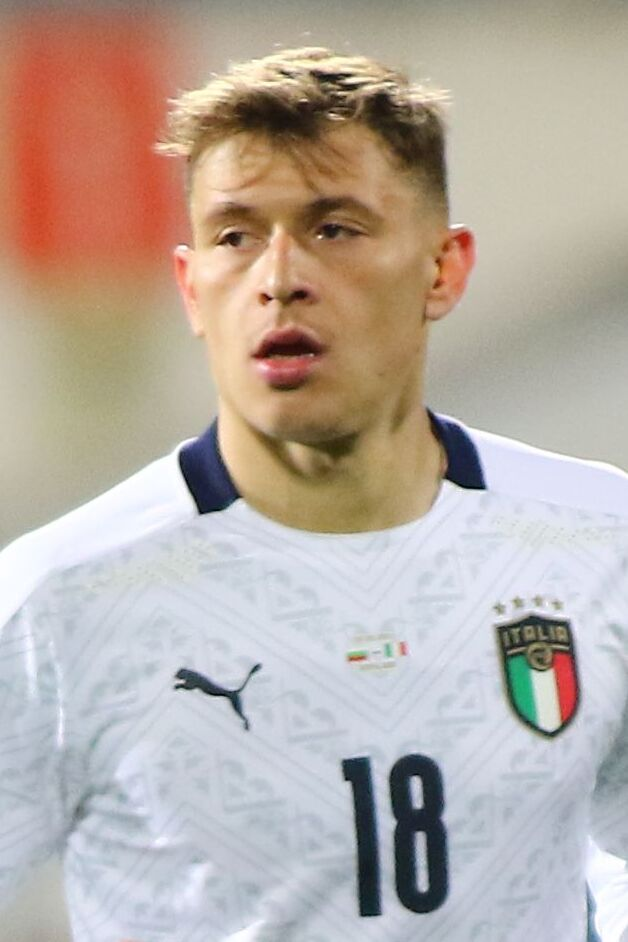
- Barella with Italy in 2021

Personal information
- Full name: Nicolò Barella
- Date of birth: 7 February 1997 (age 29)
- Place of birth: Cagliari, Italy
- Height: 1.75 m (5 ft 9 in)
- Position: Midfielder

Team information
- Current team: Inter Milan
- Number: 23

Youth career
- 2006–2015: Cagliari

Senior career*
Years	Team	Apps	(Gls)
2015–2020	Cagliari	105	(7)
2016	→ Como (loan)	16	(0)
2019–2020	→ Inter Milan (loan)	27	(1)
2020–	Inter Milan	222	(21)

International career^{‡}
2012	Italy U15	5	(0)
2012–2013	Italy U16	4	(0)
2013–2014	Italy U17	5	(0)
2014–2015	Italy U18	8	(0)
2015–2016	Italy U19	16	(0)
2016–2017	Italy U20	8	(0)
2017–2019	Italy U21	9	(1)
2018–	Italy	75	(10)
Medal record
Men's Football
Representing Italy
UEFA European Championship
Winner	2020 Europe
UEFA Nations League
Third place	2021 Italy
Third place	2023 Netherlands
FIFA U-20 World Cup
Third place	2017 South Korea
UEFA European Under-19 Championship
Runner-up	2016 Germany
CONMEBOL–UEFA Cup of Champions
Runner-up	2022 England
- * Club domestic league appearances and goals as of 22 November 2026 ‡ National team caps and goals as of 15 November 2026

Nicolò Barella Cavaliere OMRI (Italian pronunciation: [nikoˈlɔ‿bbaˈrɛlla]; born 7 February 1997) is an Italian professional footballer who plays as a central midfielder for Serie A club Inter Milan and the Italy national team. Known for his technical ability, work rate, and creativity, he is often recognised as one of the best midfielders in the world.

== Club career ==
=== Cagliari and short spell in Como ===
Born in Cagliari, Barella is a youth exponent from Cagliari Calcio. He made his first appearance on 15 January 2015, playing against Parma at the Tardini in the Coppa Italia, which resulted in a 2–1 loss. His debut in Serie A came on 4 May 2015 again against Parma, replacing Diego Farias after 68 minutes in a 4–0 home win.

In January 2016, he was sent on loan to Como in Serie B, where he played as a first-choice for the second part of the season.

On 17 September 2017, after having returned to Cagliari, he scored his first professional and Serie A goal against SPAL in a 2–0 home win. Three months later, he became the youngest captain ever in the history of Cagliari, at the age of 20 years, 10 months, and 9 days.

On 24 February 2019, in the match against Sampdoria, which was lost 1–0, he reached 100 appearances with the Cagliari jersey at the age of 22. At the end of the season, Barella is the player with the highest number of balls recovered (253) in the 2018–19 Serie A, also winning the Premio Bulgarelli Number 8 for the best midfielder of the season and being included for the first time in the Serie A Team of the Year.

=== Inter Milan ===
==== 2019–20 ====
On 12 July 2019, Barella joined Inter Milan on a year-long loan deal with an obligation to buy with a four-year contract to take effect after the loan period. He made his club debut on 26 August against Lecce; he came off the bench in the second half for Matías Vecino, and later helped set-up Antonio Candreva's goal in an eventual 4–0 home win in Inter's opening match of the 2019–20 Serie A season. He made his Champions League debut on 17 September against Slavia Prague; after coming off the bench for Marcelo Brozović in the second half, he scored an injury-time equalising goal to help Inter to a 1–1 home draw, which was his first goal both in the competition and for Inter. On 9 November, he scored his first league goal for the club as Inter came from behind to achieve a 2–1 home win over Verona. He scored his first goal in the Coppa Italia on 29 January 2020, in 2–1 home win over Fiorentina, in the quarter-finals of the tournament. With the team, he reached the 2020 UEFA Europa League final, where they lost to Sevilla. At the end of the season, he was included in the Serie A Team of the Year and the UEFA Europa League Squad of the season.

==== 2020–21 ====
On 17 January 2021, Barella assisted for the first goal for Arturo Vidal and scored a vital second in a 2–0 home win against rivals and defending champions Juventus in Serie A. At the end of the 2020–21 Serie A season, he won the Scudetto and was elected Best Midfielder by Lega Serie A as well as included (for the third edition in a row) in the 2020–21 Serie A Team of the Year.

==== 2021–22 ====
On 5 November 2021, Barella signed a contract extension with Inter, keeping him at the club until 2026. At the end of the 2021–22 season, after having won the Coppa Italia and the Supercoppa Italiana, Barella (and his teammate Hakan Çalhanoğlu) totalled 12 assists, which is the highest number for an Inter player since Opta Sports started collecting such data in 2004–05. At the end of the season, he was included in the 2021–22 Serie A Team of the Year for the fourth year in a row.

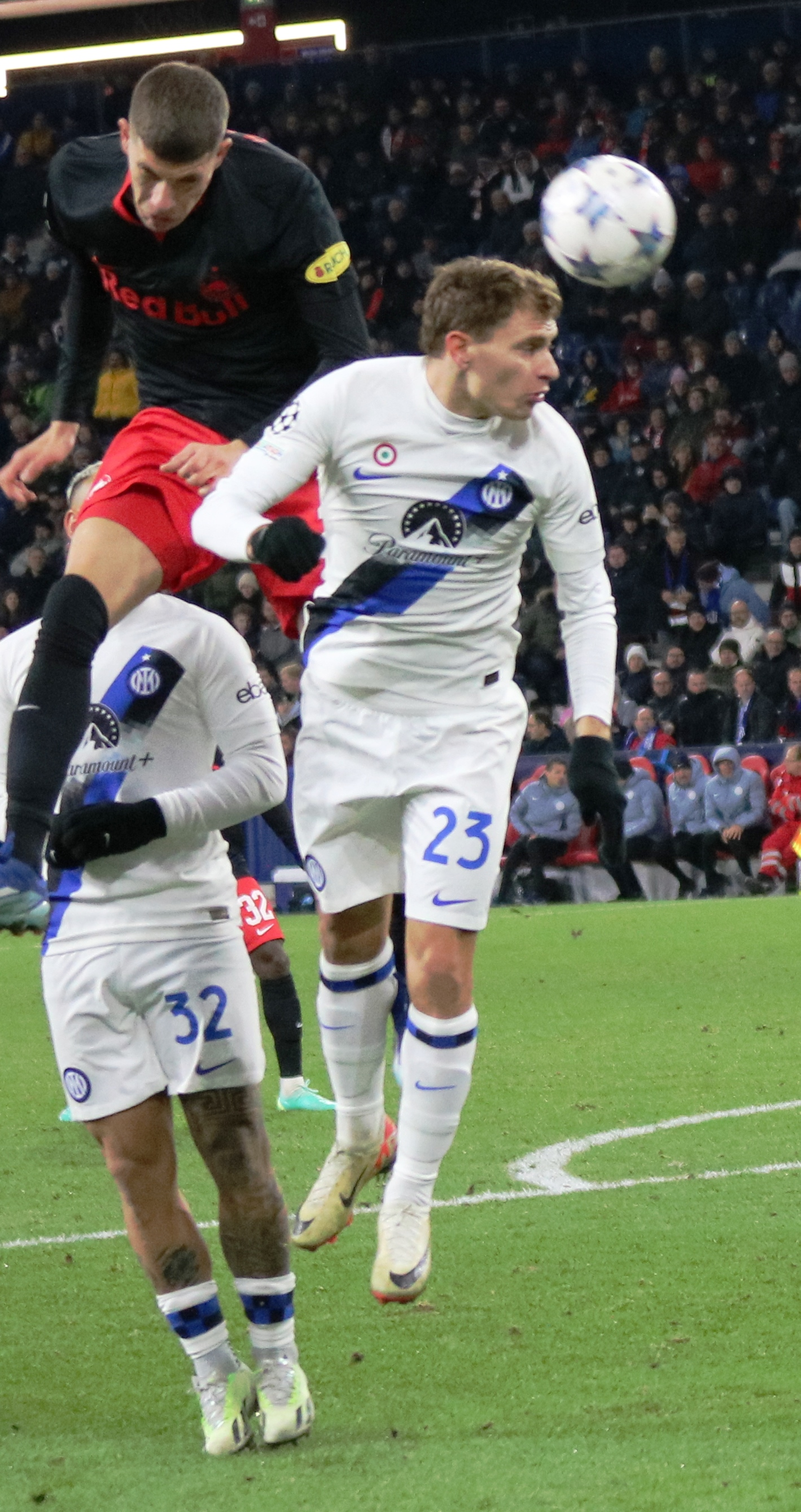
Barella (right) with Internazionale in 2023

==== 2022–23 ====
In the 2022–23 season, Barella won the Coppa Italia and Supercoppa Italiana with Inter again. In the Coppa Italia final, he assisted Lautaro Martinez for the second Nerazzurri's goal. He was awarded the Best Midfielder title again by Lega Serie A and included in the Serie A Team of the Year for the fifth year in a row. In the Champions League, Barella reached the final with Inter, which was the first time the club had reached the final in 13 years. He received the Player of the Match award during the tournament for his outstanding performance in the 3-3 draw against Barcelona in the group stage, in which he scored the opening goal.

==== 2023–24 ====
During the Inter-Roma match on 29 October 2023, he made his 200th appearance for Inter. On 22 April 2024, he won the Serie A title for the second time in his career, and was included in the Serie A Team of the Year for a record six times in a row. On 11 June 2024, he extended his contract with the club until 2029.

==== 2024–25 ====
On 30 August 2024, he scored his first goal of the 2024–25 season with a spectacular volley in a 4-0 home win against Atalanta. In the 2024–25 UEFA Champions League, he was assigned the official Player of the Match award twice, against Manchester City in Matchday 1 and Young Boys in Matchday 3. He reached the final again (the second in three year), where Inter suffered the heaviest defeat in the history of the competition's finals, losing 5–0 to PSG. He was included again in the Team of the Year, extending the streak to 7 in a row.

After the Champions League final, Barella made his debut with Inter in the new-format FIFA Club World Cup, assisting Lautaro Martínez from a corner in the second match, a 2–1 win against Urawa Red Diamonds. Inter, however, were eliminated by Fluminense in the round of 16.

==== 2025–26 ====
On 25 October 2025, Barella made his 300th appearance for Inter in all competitions. During the 2025–26 season, Barella faced criticism in the Italian media for a perceived decline in form, with reports highlighting a drop in his attacking output and questioning his recent performances for both Inter and the Italy national team. His form was reported to have improved towards the closing stages of the campaign, with Italian media noting a recovery after an underwhelming start to 2026, as he went on to win his third Scudetto and his third Coppa Italia with the club at the end of the season.

== International career ==
=== Youth ===
Barella was part of the Italy national under-21 football team in the 2019 UEFA European Under-21 Championship.

=== Senior ===
Barella was called up to the senior Italian senior squad by coach Gian Piero Ventura for the team's 2018 World Cup qualification against Macedonia and Albania in October 2017. On 10 October 2018, he made his debut under coach Roberto Mancini in a 1–1 friendly draw against Ukraine in Genoa. On 23 March 2019, Barella scored his first goal for Italy in a 2–0 home victory against Finland in a UEFA Euro 2020 qualifying match.

In June 2021, Barella was included in Italy's squad for UEFA Euro 2020. In Italy's second group match on 16 June, he set up Manuel Locatelli second goal in an eventual 3–0 victory against Switzerland, which allowed Italy to advance to the round of 16. On 2 July, he scored Italy's opening goal of the match, and later assisted Lorenzo Insigne's goal, in a 2–1 victory against Belgium in the quarter-finals of the competition. On 11 July, Barella won the European Championship with Italy following a 3–2 penalty shoot-out victory against England at Wembley Stadium in the final, after a 1–1 draw in extra-time; Barella started the match, but was replaced by Bryan Cristante in the second half of regulation time. On 10 October, Barella scored the opening goal in a 2–1 home victory against Belgium in the bronze medal match of the 2020–21 UEFA Nations League.

On 24 March 2024, Barella was given the captain’s armband for the first time in a 2–0 friendly victory against Ecuador, in which he also scored the second goal. Later that June, was included in Italy's squad for UEFA Euro 2024. In the Azzurri's first match of the competition, he scored the winning goal in a 2–1 victory against Albania with a half-volley from the edge of the box. However, Italy was eliminated by Switzerland in the round of 16 following a 2–0 defeat.

In March 2026, Italy failed to qualify for the 2026 FIFA World Cup, making it the nation's third consecutive absence from the tournament. Barella started in both of Italy's play-off matches, a 2–0 semi-final win over Northern Ireland and a 1–1 draw against Bosnia and Herzegovina in the final, which Italy lost 4–1 on penalties. In the decisive match in Zenica, Barella provided the assist for Moise Kean's opening goal, but Italy were reduced to ten men before half-time after his Inter teammate Alessandro Bastoni was sent off.

== Style of play ==
Barella is considered a talented midfielder in the European sports media. He was named the best young Italian player born in 1997 for two consecutive years between 2012 and 2013. Italian football journalist Mina Rzouki described him as an intelligent, promising, and composed midfielder, despite his young age, with a wide range of skills. She also commented that Barella "...can dribble through a defence, score volleys and start counter-attacks. He knows how to find the right passes and is box-to-box. Most importantly he can win back possession quickly and recover the ball." Barella's performances have also been praised by Italian former footballers Andrea Pirlo and Alessandro Del Piero. The Italian sports newspaper La Gazzetta dello Sport has compared him to Steven Gerrard, describing him as a dynamic player with good technique, vision, stamina, and physical strength, despite his relatively short stature, as well as an ability to win balls, which enables him to break down possession and subsequently start quick attacking plays. A versatile player, he is capable of playing anywhere in midfield, and has even been used as an attacking midfielder or as a defensive midfielder, but his favoured role is as a right-sided, offensive-minded central midfielder, known as a "mezzala" in Italy. Known for his eye for goal, he possesses a good shot from outside the area, and is known for his ability to make late attacking runs from behind into the penalty area. He is also an accurate set piece and penalty taker. He is known for his strong character, leadership qualities, competitive spirit, and winning mentality, but has also drawn criticism at times in the press for protesting or arguing excessively with officials during matches. He has also been praised for his work-rate and creativity. His Italy teammate Jorginho has likened him to N'Golo Kanté. In 2021, former manager Fabio Capello described him as one of the three best midfielders in European football, while in 2023, ESPN included him in their list of 100 best men's soccer attacking midfielders.

== Personal life ==
Barella married Federica Schievenin in 2018, and they have since become parents to three daughters and a son.

== Career statistics ==
=== Club ===
As of match played 22 November 2026

Appearances and goals by club, season and competition
Club	Season	League			Coppa Italia		Europe		Other		Total	
Club	Season	Division	Apps	Goals	Apps	Goals	Apps	Goals	Apps	Goals	Apps	Goals
Cagliari	2014–15	Serie A	3	0	1	0	—		—		4	0
Cagliari	2015–16	Serie B	5	0	0	0	—		—		5	0
Cagliari	2016–17	Serie A	28	0	2	0	—		—		30	0
Cagliari	2017–18	Serie A	34	6	1	0	—		—		35	6
Cagliari	2018–19	Serie A	35	1	3	0	—		—		38	1
Cagliari	Total		105	7	7	0	—		—		112	7
Como (loan)	2015–16	Serie B	16	0	0	0	—		—		16	0
Inter Milan (loan)	2019–20	Serie A	27	1	4	1	10 (Note: Four appearances and one goal in UEFA Champions League, six appearances and one goal in UEFA Europa League)	2	—		41	4
Inter Milan	2020–21	Serie A	36	3	4	0	6 (Note: Appearances in UEFA Champions League)	0	—		46	3
Inter Milan	2021–22	Serie A	36	3	5	1	6	0	1 (Note: Appearance(s) in Supercoppa Italiana)	0	48	4
Inter Milan	2022–23	Serie A	35	6	4	0	12	3	1	0	52	9
Inter Milan	2023–24	Serie A	37	2	1	0	8	0	2	0	48	2
Inter Milan	2024–25	Serie A	33	3	3	0	13	0	6 (Note: Two appearances in Supercoppa Italiana, four appearances in FIFA Club World Cup)	0	55	3
Inter Milan	2025–26	Serie A	34	3	2	0	8	0	1	0	45	3
Inter Milan	2026–27	Serie A	11	1	0	0	4	0	0	0	15	1
Inter Milan	Inter total		249	22	23	2	67	5	11	0	350	29
Career total			370	29	30	2	67	5	11	0	478	36

=== International ===
As of match played 15 November 2026

Appearances and goals by national team and year
National team	Year	Apps	Goals
Italy	2018	4	0
Italy	2019	8	3
Italy	2020	6	1
Italy	2021	17	3
Italy	2022	7	1
Italy	2023	9	0
Italy	2024	8	2
Italy	2025	9	0
Italy	2026	7	0
Total		75	10

Scores and results list Italy's goal tally first, score column indicates score after each Barella goal.

List of international goals scored by Nicolò Barella
No.	Date	Venue	Cap	Opponent	Score	Result	Competition
1	23 March 2019	Stadio Friuli, Udine, Italy	5	Finland	1–0	2–0	UEFA Euro 2020 qualifying
2	8 June 2019	Olympic Stadium, Athens, Greece	6	Greece	1–0	3–0	UEFA Euro 2020 qualifying
3	18 November 2019	Stadio Renzo Barbera, Palermo, Italy	12	Armenia	3–0	9–1	UEFA Euro 2020 qualifying
4	7 September 2020	Johan Cruyff Arena, Amsterdam, Netherlands	14	Netherlands	1–0	1–0	2020–21 UEFA Nations League A
5	4 June 2021	Stadio Renato Dall'Ara, Bologna, Italy	23	Czech Republic	2–0	4–0	Friendly
6	2 July 2021	Allianz Arena, Munich, Germany	27	Belgium	1–0	2–1	UEFA Euro 2020
7	10 October 2021	Juventus Stadium, Turin, Italy	33	Belgium	1–0	2–1	2021 UEFA Nations League Finals
8	7 June 2022	Stadio Dino Manuzzi, Cesena, Italy	38	Hungary	1–0	2–1	2022–23 UEFA Nations League A
9	24 March 2024	Red Bull Arena, Harrison, United States	53	Ecuador	2–0	2–0	Friendly
10	15 June 2024	Westfalenstadion, Dortmund, Germany	54	Albania	2–1	2–1	UEFA Euro 2024

== Honours ==
Inter Milan

- Serie A: 2020–21, 2023–24, 2025–26
- Coppa Italia: 2021–22, 2022–23, 2025–26
- Supercoppa Italiana: 2021, 2022, 2023
- UEFA Champions League runner-up: 2022–23, 2024–25
- UEFA Europa League runner-up: 2019–20

Italy U19

- UEFA European Under-19 Championship runner-up: 2016

Italy U20

- FIFA U-20 World Cup third place: 2017

Italy

- UEFA European Championship: 2020
- UEFA Nations League third place: 2020–21, 2022–23

Individual

- Ballon d'Or: 26th (2021), 27th (2023)
- Premio Bulgarelli Number 8: 2019–20
- Serie A Team of the Year: 2018–19, 2019–20, 2020–21, 2021–22, 2022–23, 2023–24 2024–25
- UEFA Europa League Squad of the Season: 2019–20
- Serie A Best Midfielder: 2020–21, 2022–23
- Serie A Team of the Season: 2022–23, 2024–25
- Serie A Goal of the Month: August 2024
- Gazzetta Sports Awards Exploit of the Year: 2021
- Giuseppe Prisco Award: 2022

=== Orders ===
- 5th Class / Knight: Cavaliere Ordine al Merito della Repubblica Italiana: 2021
