= Andrea Casarini =

Italian footballer (born 1994)

Personal information
- Date of birth: 30 May 1994 (age 32)
- Place of birth: Tradate, Italy
- Height: 1.83 m (6 ft 0 in)
- Position: Midfielder

Youth career
- Legnano
- Novara

Senior career*
Years	Team	Apps	(Gls)
2013–2015	Parma	0	(0)
2013–2014	→ Viareggio (loan)	1	(0)
2014	→ Novara (loan)	0	(0)
2014–2015	→ Savona (loan)	13	(0)
2015	→ Bassano (loan)	2	(0)
- * Club domestic league appearances and goals

Andrea Casarini (born 30 May 1994) is an Italian footballer who played in the third tier of Italian football.

== Biography ==
=== Youth career ===
Born in Tradate, Lombardy region, Casarini was a player for Legnano's under-15 team in 2008–09 season. He then signed by Novara, which he was the captain of the reserve team in 2012–13 season.

=== Parma ===
On 29 August 2013 he was swapped with Federico Davighi of Parma in co-ownership deal. The 50% registration rights of the players were valued at €600,000. Casarini signed a 5-year contract, while Davighi signed a 3-year contract. He also received a call-up from Italy under-20 team on 2 September, However along with Benassi, Insigne and Nicolao, they were axed from the final 20-men line-up on 6 September, with Padovan as an additional call-up. Casarini also joined Viareggio in temporary deal on 2 September. However Casarini only played once in 2013–14 Lega Pro Prima Divisione season. On 30 January 2014 Casarini returned to Novara Calcio in temporary deal. Casarini did not play any game in 2014–15 Serie B either. On 20 June 2014 the co-ownership deals were renewed.

On 1 September 2014 he was signed by another third division club Savona. On 2 February 2015 he was swapped with Nicolò Tonon, whom on loan at Bassano from Atalanta.
