= Luca Crosta =

Italian footballer (born 1998)

Personal information
- Date of birth: 23 February 1998 (age 28)
- Place of birth: Milan, Italy
- Height: 1.92 m (6 ft 4 in)
- Position: Goalkeeper

Team information
- Current team: Alba
- Number: 1

Youth career
- 2012–2016: Milan

Senior career*
Years	Team	Apps	(Gls)
2017–2020	Cagliari	3	(0)
2018–2019	→ Olbia (loan)	8	(0)
2019	→ Livorno (loan)	0	(0)
2019–2020	→ Olbia (loan)	13	(0)
2020	→ Renate (loan)	0	(0)
2020–2021	Alessandria	1	(0)
2022–2023	Irodotos	18	(0)
2023	Dinamo Tirana	9	(0)
2024–	Alba	8	(0)

International career
2013	Italy U15	3	(0)
2013	Italy U16	2	(0)
- * Club domestic league appearances and goals as of 5 May 2024

Luca Crosta (born 23 February 1998) is an Italian professional footballer who plays as a goalkeeper for Serie D club Alba. He began his career in the youth system of Milan.

== Club career ==
=== Early life and career ===
Crosta was born in Milan, and developed his football career in the youth system of his hometown club, A.C. Milan.

=== Cagliari ===
He transferred to Cagliari on 8 July 2016. In his first season, he made 13 appearances for Cagliari's Primavera team, and was among the substitutes – without being used – for 18 Serie A matches, before making his senior debut on 28 May 2017 against his former club in the final match not only of Cagliari's season but also of their Sant'Elia stadium. Cagliari took an early lead, then Crosta made a fine save from Carlos Bacca, and then saved a penalty taken by the same player. Crosta then fouled Bacca to concede a second penalty, from which Gianluca Lapadula equalised for Milan. In the last minute of the match, Fabio Pisacane gave Cagliari the victory and a top-half finish.

The following day, Crosta signed his first professional contract with Cagliari, to run until 2019.

==== Loan to Olbia ====
On 17 July 2018, Crosta joined Olbia on loan until 30 June 2019.

==== Loan to Livorno ====
On 31 January 2019, Serie B club Livorno announced that they loaned Crosta from Olbia.

==== Second loan to Olbia and loan to Renate ====
On 19 July 2019, he joined Olbia on another loan. On 31 January 2020, he moved on loan to Renate.

=== Alessandria ===
On 5 October 2020, he joined Alessandria.

== International career ==
In 2013, Crosta played three times for Italy at under-15 level and twice for the under-16 team.

== Career statistics ==
=== Club ===
Updated 20 May 2018

Club	League	Season	League		Cup		Europe		Other		Total	
Club	League	Season	Apps	Goals	Apps	Goals	Apps	Goals	Apps	Goals	Apps	Goals
Cagliari	Serie A	2016–17	1	0	0	0	–		–		1	0
Cagliari	Serie A	2017–18	1	0	1	0	–		–		2	0
Career total			2	0	1	0	–		–		3	0
