= Premio Bulgarelli Number 8 =

Italian football award

- Sport: Association football
- Awarded for: Best midfielder of each calendar year
- Local name: Premio Bulgarelli Number 8 (Italian)
- Country: Italy
- Presented by: Associazione Bulgarelli; Italian Footballers' Association

History
- First award: 2011
- Editions: 11
- First winner: Xavi (ESP); (2012)
- Most recent: Lewis Ferguson (SCO); (2024)

The Bulgarelli Number 8 Award is an annual association football award given by the Associazione Bulgarelli and Italian Footballers' Association, with the support of FIFPRO, to the best midfielder of the previous calendar year. The award is named in honor of Giacomo Bulgarelli, considered one of Italy's greatest midfielders; the number 8, which Bulgarelli wore throughout his career, is associated with a midfield player in the traditional football numbering system.

== History and regulations ==
The award originated from an idea by Italian journalist Luigi Colombo. The award is given by a jury. In the first edition, the jury was chaired by Fabio Capello and composed of former football players and managers Sandro Mazzola, Gianni Rivera, Sergio Campana, Damiano Tommasi, Luis Suárez, Cesare Prandelli, Giovanni Trapattoni, José Altafini, Giovanni Lodetti, Francesco Janich, Romano Fogli, Ezio Pascutti, Marino Perani, Leonardo Grosso as well as Colombo himself.

The award was temporarily interrupted after the 2013 edition due to a lack of financial sponsors. The award was restored in 2016.

== Winners ==
Season	Men		Women		Ref.
Season	Winner	Club	Winner	Club	Ref.
2011–12	(Spain) Xavi	Barcelona	–		
2012–13	(Italy) Andrea Pirlo	Juventus	–		
2013–14	(Ivory Coast) Yaya Touré	Manchester City	–		
2016–17	(France) Paul Pogba	Juventus	–		
2018	(Spain) Andrés Iniesta	Barcelona	–		
2017–18	(Italy) Daniele De Rossi	Roma	–		
2018–19	(Italy) Nicolò Barella	Cagliari	(Italy) Marta Carissimi	Milan	
2020–21	(Italy) Manuel Locatelli	Sassuolo	(Italy) Valentina Cernoia	Juventus	
2021–22	(Italy) Sandro Tonali	Milan	(Italy) Manuela Giugliano	Roma	
2022–23	(Italy) Davide Frattesi	Sassuolo	(Italy) Alice Parisi	Fiorentina	
2023–24	(Scotland) Lewis Ferguson	Bologna	(Italy) Giada Greggi	Roma	

=== Other awards ===
==== Best Women's Serie A Coach ====
Season	Winner	Club	Ref.
2018–19	(Italy) Rita Guarino	Juventus	
2020–21	(Italy) Elisabetta Bavagnoli	Roma	
2021–22	(Italy) Gianpiero Piovani	Sassuolo	
2022–23	(Italy) Alessandro Spugna	Roma	
2023–24	(Argentina) Sebastián De La Fuente	Fiorentina	

==== Best Serie A Coach ====
Season	Winner	Club	Ref.
2020–21	(Italy) Roberto Mancini	Italy	
2021–22	(Italy) Stefano Pioli	Milan	
2022–23	(Italy) Luciano Spalletti	Napoli	
2023–24	(Italy) Simone Inzaghi	Inter Milan	

==== Best Young Player ====
Season	Winner	Club	Ref.
2021–22	(Italy) Giacomo Raspadori	Sassuolo	

==== Best Serie A Referee ====
Season	Winner	Ref.
2021–22	(Italy) Daniele Orsato	
2022–23	(Italy) Daniele Orsato	
2023–24	(Italy) Marco Guida	

==== Lifetime Achievement ====
Year	Winner	Ref.
2022	(Brazil) José Altafini	
2024	(Italy) Gianluigi Buffon	
