= Federico Serra =

Italian footballer

Personal information
- Date of birth: 9 December 1997 (age 28)
- Place of birth: Cagliari, Italy
- Height: 1.66 m (5 ft 5 in)
- Position: Midfielder

Team information
- Current team: Akron Zips

Youth career
- 2014: Savona
- 2014–2017: Cagliari

College career
Years	Team	Apps	(Gls)
2019–	Akron Zips	14	(0)

Senior career*
Years	Team	Apps	(Gls)
2017–2018	Cagliari	1	(0)
2017–2018	→ Fondi (loan)	5	(0)
2018	Sandonà		
2018	Monastir Kosmoto		
- * Club domestic league appearances and goals as of 26 February 2020

Federico Serra (born 9 December 1997) is an Italian football player who plays for the Akron Zips.

== Club career ==
He made his professional debut in the Serie A for Cagliari on 5 February 2017 as a 79th minute substitute for Marco Capuano in a 0–2 loss against Atalanta.

On 14 September 2018, he joined Eccellenza club Monastir Kosmoto.

In 2019, Serra moved to the United States to attend the University of Akron and play on their soccer team.
