= Roberto Colombo (footballer) =

Italian footballer (born 1975)

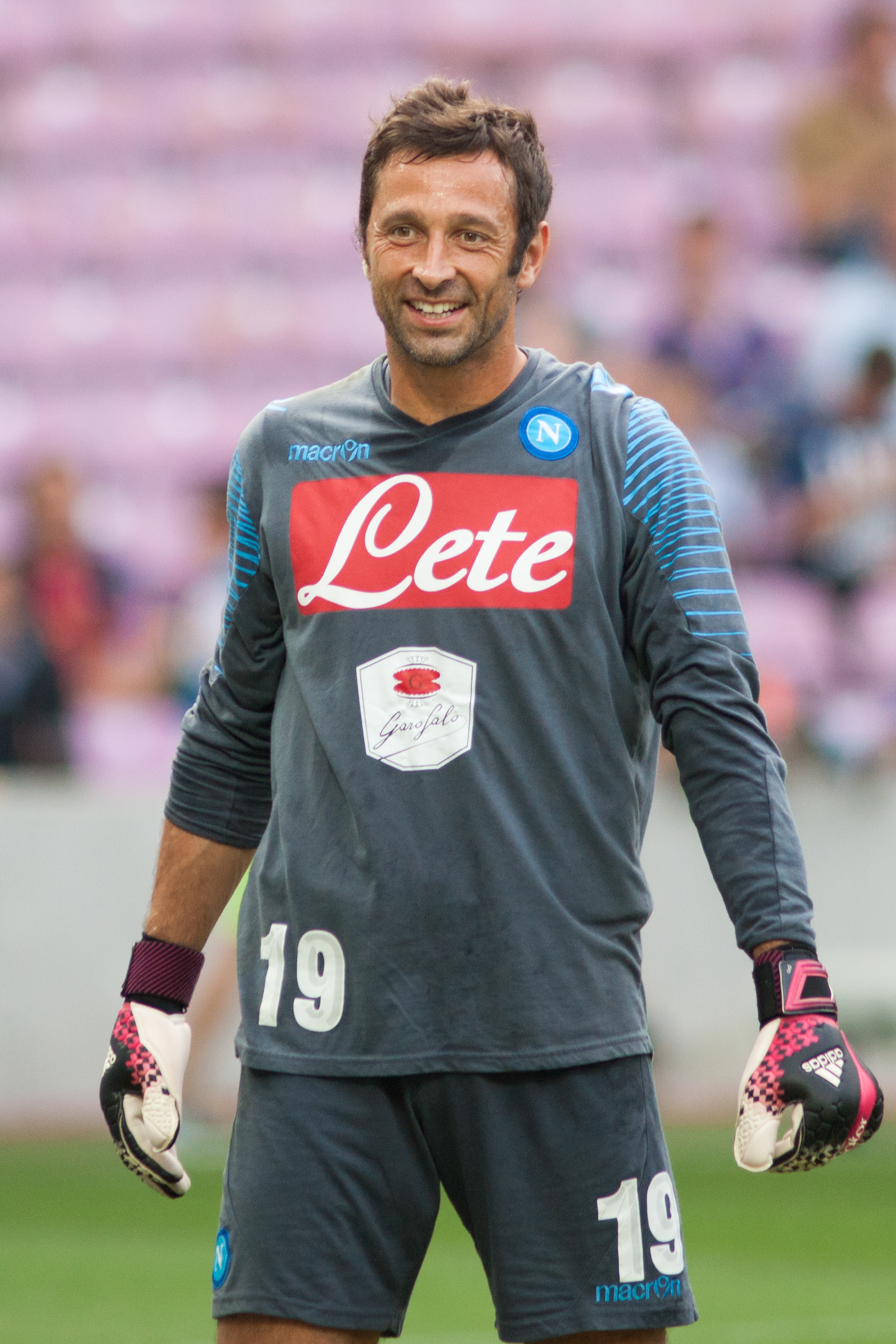
- Colombo with Napoli in August 2014

Personal information
- Full name: Roberto Colombo
- Date of birth: 24 August 1975 (age 51)
- Place of birth: Monza, Italy
- Height: 1.90 m (6 ft 3 in)
- Position: Goalkeeper

Senior career*
Years	Team	Apps	(Gls)
1994–2000	Milan	0	(0)
1995–1996	→ Valdagno (loan)	19	(0)
1996–1997	→ Fiorenzuola (loan)	3	(0)
1997–1998	→ Solbiatese (loan)	27	(0)
1998–1999	→ Monza (loan)	1	(0)
2000–2005	Padova	126	(0)
2005–2006	San Marino	33	(0)
2006–2010	Bologna	8	(0)
2010–2011	Triestina	33	(0)
2011–2015	Napoli	1	(0)
2015–2017	Cagliari	2	(0)
Total		253	(0)

International career
1993–1994	Italy U18	5	(0)
- * Club domestic league appearances and goals

Roberto Colombo (born 24 August 1975) is an Italian former professional football goalkeeper.

== Football career ==
=== Early career ===
Colombo was the product of A.C. Milan youth ranks. He was on loan to Valdagno (Serie C2), Fiorenzuola (Serie C1), Solbiatese (Serie C2) and Monza (Serie B), before joining Milan's first team in the first half of the 1999–00 season.

=== Padova ===
In January 2000, he joined Calcio Padova (Serie C2). He helped the club promote to Serie C1 in the summer of 2001, but the following season, he made only one appearance. He became the first-choice goalkeeper again in the summer of 2003.

He played 126 league games for the club before joining San Marino Calcio (Serie C1). In San Marino, he just missed one Serie C1 game, out of 34 (plus two relegation playoff ties).

=== Bologna ===
Since the departure of Gianluca Pagliuca and Emanuele Manitta, Colombo and Francesco Antonioli were signed by Bologna as backup and first-choice keepers, respectively.

In May 2010, at the end of Serie A season, he was borrowed by A.C. Milan for a club friendly against D.C. United.

=== Triestina ===
In August 2010, he signed a one-year contract as first-choice keeper with Triestina.

=== Napoli ===
In July 2010, he signed with Serie A side Napoli.

=== Cagliari ===
In January 2015, he joined Cagliari as a third-choice keeper.

== Career statistics ==
=== Club ===
Appearances and goals by club, season and competition
Club	Season	League			National cup		Europe		Other		Total	
Club	Season	Division	Apps	Goals	Apps	Goals	Apps	Goals	Apps	Goals	Apps	Goals
Milan	1999–2000	Serie A	0	0	0	0	0	0	0	0	0	0
Valdagno (loan)	1995–96	Serie C2	19	0	0	0	—		—		19	0
Fiorenzuola (loan)	1996–97	Serie C1	3	0	0	0	—		—		3	0
Solbiatese (loan)	1997–98	Serie C2	27	0	0	0	—		2	0	29	0
Monza (loan)	1998–99	Serie B	1	0	0	0	—		—		1	0
Padova	1999–2000	Serie C2	14	0	0	0	—		—		14	0
Padova	2000–01	Serie C2	21	0	2	0	—		—		23	0
Padova	2001–02	Serie C1	1	0	2	0	—		—		3	0
Padova	2002–03	Serie C1	24	0	10	0	—		2	0	36	0
Padova	2003–04	Serie C1	32	0	1	0	—		—		33	0
Padova	2004–05	Serie C1	34	0	0	0	—		—		34	0
Padova	Total		126	0	15	0	—		2	0	143	0
San Marino	2005–06	Serie C1	33	0	1	0	—		2	0	36	0
Bologna	2006–07	Serie B	1	0	0	0	—		—		1	0
Bologna	2007–08	Serie B	0	0	0	0	—		—		0	0
Bologna	2008–09	Serie A	3	0	2	0	—		—		5	0
Bologna	2009–10	Serie A	4	0	0	0	—		—		4	0
Bologna	Total		8	0	2	0	—		—		10	0
Triestina	2010–11	Serie B	33	0	0	0	—		—		33	0
Napoli	2011–12	Serie A	0	0	0	0	0	0	—		0	0
Napoli	2012–13	Serie A	0	0	0	0	0	0	0	0	0	0
Napoli	2013–14	Serie A	1	0	0	0	0	0	—		1	0
Napoli	2014–15	Serie A	0	0	0	0	0	0	0	0	0	0
Napoli	Total		1	0	0	0	0	0	0	0	1	0
Cagliari	2015–16	Serie A	0	0	0	0	—		—		0	0
Cagliari	2016–17	Serie A	2	0	0	0	—		—		2	0
Cagliari	Total		2	0	0	0	—		—		2	0
Career total			253	0	18	0	0	0	4	0	275	0

== Honours ==
Napoli

- Coppa Italia: 2011–12, 2013–14
- Supercoppa Italiana: 2014
