= Luca Bittante =

Italian footballer

Personal information
- Date of birth: 14 August 1993 (age 33)
- Place of birth: Bassano del Grappa, Italy
- Height: 1.84 m (6 ft 0 in)
- Position: Right back

Team information
- Current team: Sora
- Number: 23

Youth career
- 2008–2012: Fiorentina

Senior career*
Years	Team	Apps	(Gls)
2012–2015	Avellino	88	(1)
2015	Fiorentina	0	(0)
2015–2019	Empoli	16	(0)
2016–2017	→ Cagliari (loan)	5	(0)
2017	→ Salernitana (loan)	18	(0)
2017–2018	→ Carpi (loan)	14	(0)
2019–2022	Cosenza	60	(3)
2023–2024	Monterosi	40	(2)
2025	Pompei	7	(0)
2025–	Sora	16	(0)

International career
2011	Italy U18	1	(0)
2013	Italy U20	1	(0)
- * Club domestic league appearances and goals as of 1 March 2025

Luca Bittante (born 14 August 1993) is an Italian footballer who plays for Serie D club Sora.

== Club career ==
Born in Bassano del Grappa, Bittante finished his youth career with Fiorentina, but left without making a first-team appearance, signing a co-ownership deal with Avellino.

On 24 August, Bittante made his Serie B debut, starting in a 2–1 home success over Novara.

On 19 June 2014, Fiorentina and Avellino renewed the co-ownership for another year.

On 3 February 2023, Bittante signed with Monterosi in Serie C.
