= Federico Melchiorri =

Italian footballer (born 1987)

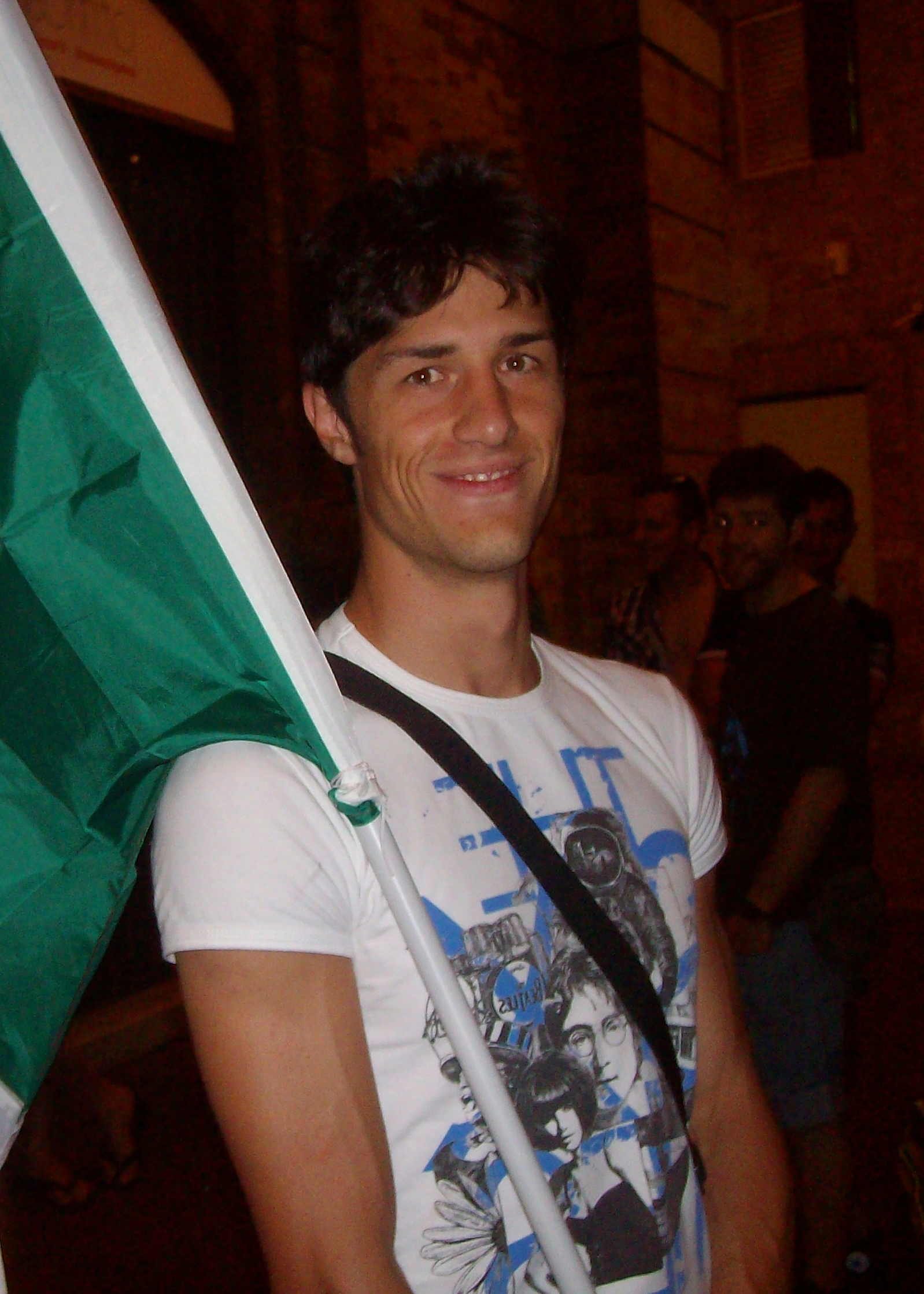
- Melchiorri in 2012

Personal information
- Date of birth: 6 January 1987 (age 39)
- Place of birth: Treia, Italy
- Height: 1.85 m (6 ft 1 in)
- Position: Striker

Team information
- Current team: Recanatese
- Number: 9

Youth career
- 2006–2007: Siena

Senior career*
Years	Team	Apps	(Gls)
2004–2006	Tolentino	28	(7)
2005	→ Valleverde Riccione (loan)	2	(0)
2006–2007	Siena	1	(0)
2007–2009	Sambenedettese	4	(0)
2007–2008	→ Giulianova (loan)	14	(2)
2009	→ Poggibonsi (loan)	11	(0)
2009–2010	Giulianova	25	(3)
2010–2012	Tolentino	47	(29)
2012–2013	Maceratese	30	(23)
2013–2014	Padova	31	(6)
2014–2015	Pescara	43	(14)
2015–2018	Cagliari	37	(11)
2018	→ Carpi (loan)	21	(7)
2018–2023	Perugia	104	(21)
2021–2022	→ SPAL (loan)	27	(5)
2023	Ancona	14	(6)
2023–	Recanatese	35	(8)
- * Club domestic league appearances and goals as of 4 May 2024

Federico Melchiorri (born 6 January 1987) is an Italian professional footballer who plays as a striker for Serie D club Recanatese.

== Biography ==
Born in Treia, Melchiorri started his career with Serie D amateurs Tolentino and successively joined Siena in January 2006. He made his Serie A debut on 20 December 2006 in a game against Empoli when he came on as a last-minute substitute for Cristian Molinaro.

Melchiorri was sold to Sambenedettese in co-ownership deal in 2007. He was then fully signed by Sambenedettese in 2009.

He was successively forced to quit football after being diagnosed with cavernoma and undergoing surgery as a result. He resumed active football later in 2010 with former club Tolentino (Eccellenza), scoring 30 goals in 54 matches.

In 2012–13 Melchiorri was sold to Maceratese (Serie D) and he scored 22 goals in 30 matches. His impressive performances caught the attention of Serie B club Padova, who signed him in the summer of 2013. He scored six goals in a rather unfortunate season for Padova, which ended with relegation and then the club being declared bankrupt. He successively joined Pescara, another Serie B club, in the summer of 2014 on a free transfer. On 8 January 2018, he was loaned to Carpi.

On 12 July 2018, Melchiorri signed with Perugia. On 31 August 2021, he moved on loan to SPAL.

On 27 January 2023, Melchiorri signed with Ancona until 30 June 2023.
