= Andrea Mastino =

Italian footballer (born 1999)

Personal information
- Date of birth: 2 September 1999 (age 27)
- Place of birth: Carbonia, Italy
- Height: 1.76 m (5 ft 9 1/2 in)
- Position: Right back

Team information
- Current team: Carbonia

Youth career
- –2018: Cagliari

Senior career*
Years	Team	Apps	(Gls)
2016–2018	Cagliari	0	(0)
2017–2018	→ Real Forte Querceta (loan)	33	(1)
2018–2020	Olbia	19	(0)
2018–2019	→ Gavorrano (loan)	32	(1)
2020–2021	Prato	19	(0)
2021–	Carbonia	3	(0)

International career
2013	Italy U15		
- * Club domestic league appearances and goals as of 17 November 2021

Andrea Mastino (born 2 September 1999) is an Italian footballer who plays for Serie D club Carbonia as a right back.

== Club career ==
Born in Carbonia, Sardinia, and represented Cagliari as a youth. On 30 November 2016 he made his first team debut, starting in a 3–0 Coppa Italia away loss against Sampdoria, but being replaced at half-time.

On 30 July 2020 he joined Serie D club Prato.
