= Marco Sau =

Italian footballer

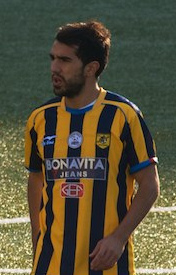
- Sau playing for Juve Stabia in 2011

Personal information
- Date of birth: 3 November 1987 (age 39)
- Place of birth: Sorgono, Italy
- Height: 1.69 m (5 ft 7 in)
- Position: Forward

Youth career
- 1996–2005: Tonara ASD
- 2005–2007: Cagliari

Senior career*
| Years | Team | Apps | (Gls) |
| 2007–2018 | Cagliari | 194 | (45) |
| 2007–2008 | → Manfredonia (loan) | 31 | (10) |
| 2008–2009 | → AlbinoLeffe (loan) | 18 | (0) |
| 2009–2010 | → Lecco (loan) | 30 | (4) |
| 2010–2011 | → Foggia (loan) | 33 | (20) |
| 2011–2012 | → Juve Stabia (loan) | 36 | (21) |
| 2019 | Sampdoria | 5 | (0) |
| 2019–2022 | Benevento | 67 | (18) |
| 2023–2024 | Feralpisalò | 16 | (1) |

International career
| 2013 | Italy | 1 | (0) |
- * Club domestic league appearances and goals as of 10 June 2024

Marco Sau (Italian: [ˈmarko ˈsau], Sardinian: [ˈmaɾku ˈza.u]; born 3 November 1987) is an Italian professional footballer who plays as a striker.

== Early life ==
Sau has been nicknamed Pattolino (Duckling) since childhood. His idol growing up was the striker Gianfranco Zola, also from his native Province of Nuoro in Sardinia.

While visiting an uncle in Scotland in his early teens, Sau played in the youth ranks of Livingston and a local team in Gourock called Glenburn Thistle.

== Club career ==
=== Cagliari ===
Sau turned professional at Cagliari in 2007. On 25 June 2008 he was signed by AlbinoLeffe. On 15 July 2009, he was loaned to Lecco.

=== Foggia ===
In August 2010 Sau was acquired by Foggia of Lega Pro Prima Divisione by head coach Zdeněk Zeman in co-ownership deals, for a peppercorn of €500, scoring 20 league goals that season. In June 2011 Foggia acquired Sau and Salvatore Burrai outright for a total of €207,000 by a closed tender mediated by Lega Serie A. However they were returned to Cagliari on 31 August 2011 for the same total price (Burrai for free and Sau for €207,000). Foggia later brought the transfer to court to claim the transfer documents were falsified.

=== Return to Cagliari ===
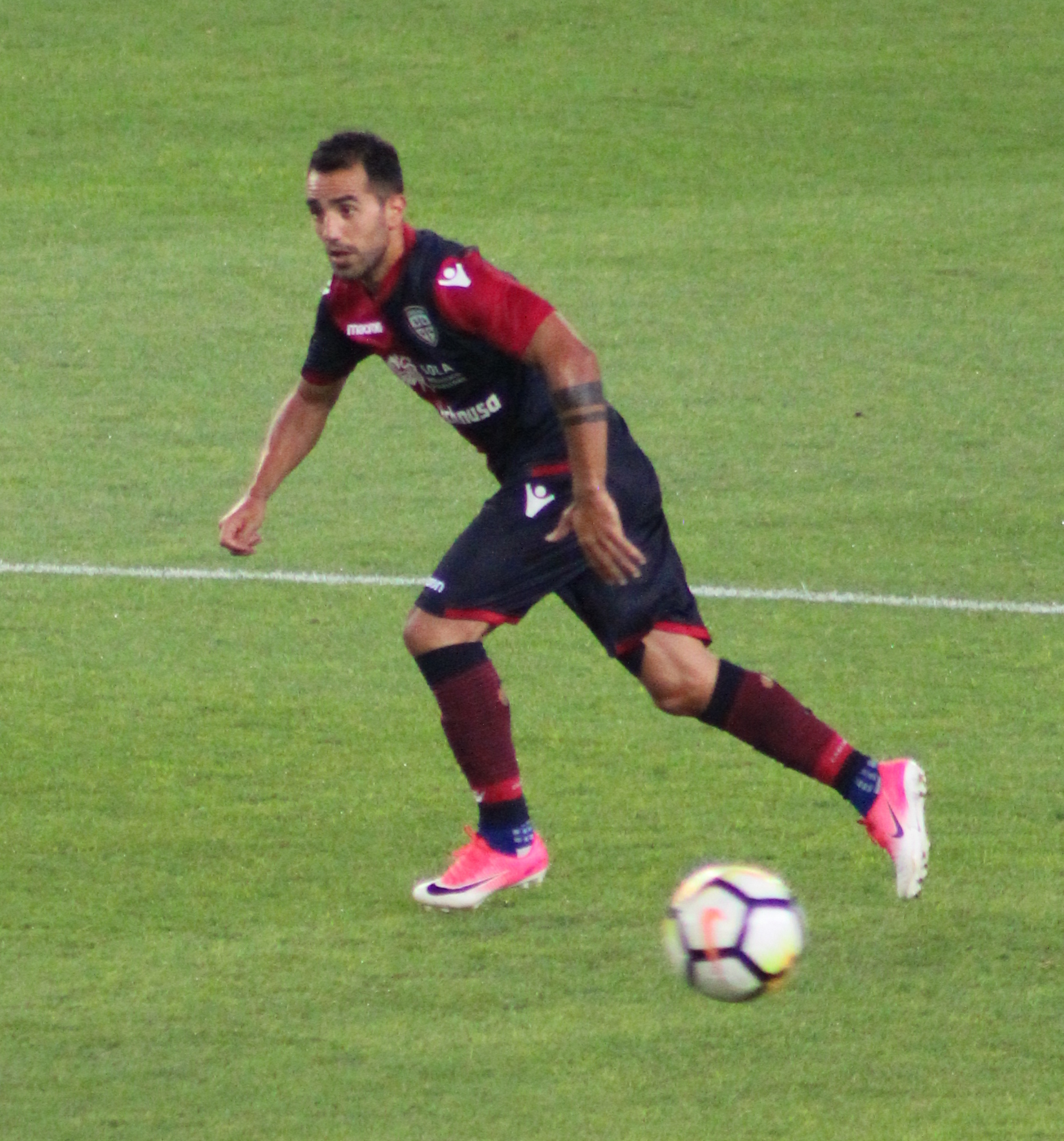
Sau with Cagliari in 2017

Sau was re-acquired by Cagliari on 31 August 2011 on a two-year contract. He played at S.S. Juve Stabia in 2011–12 Serie B season, scoring 21 goals. This form allowed him into the Cagliari first team for 2012–13.

Sau scored both of Cagliari's goals in a 2–2 draw against Inter on 18 November 2012.

On 29 August 2014, Sau renewed his contract with Cagliari until 2017.

=== Later career ===
On 31 January 2019, Sau signed with Sampdoria after seven years at Cagliari. After five goalless substitute appearances, he signed a two-year contract at Serie B's Benevento on 22 July. He scored a hat-trick on 29 December in a 4–0 home win over Ascoli, and the following 29 June he came off the bench to score the only goal against his former club Juve Stabia to win promotion to Serie A as champions with seven games left.

In February 2023, Sau signed for Serie C Group A club Feralpisalò on a contract until the end of the season with the option for a further year.

== International career ==
Sau made his international debut on 31 May 2013, coming on as a 49th-minute substitute against San Marino in a friendly 4–0 win at the Stadio Renato Dall'Ara in Bologna.

== Honours ==
Cagliari

- Serie B: 2015–16

Benevento

- Serie B: 2019–20
