= Diego Farias =

Brazilian footballer (born 1990)

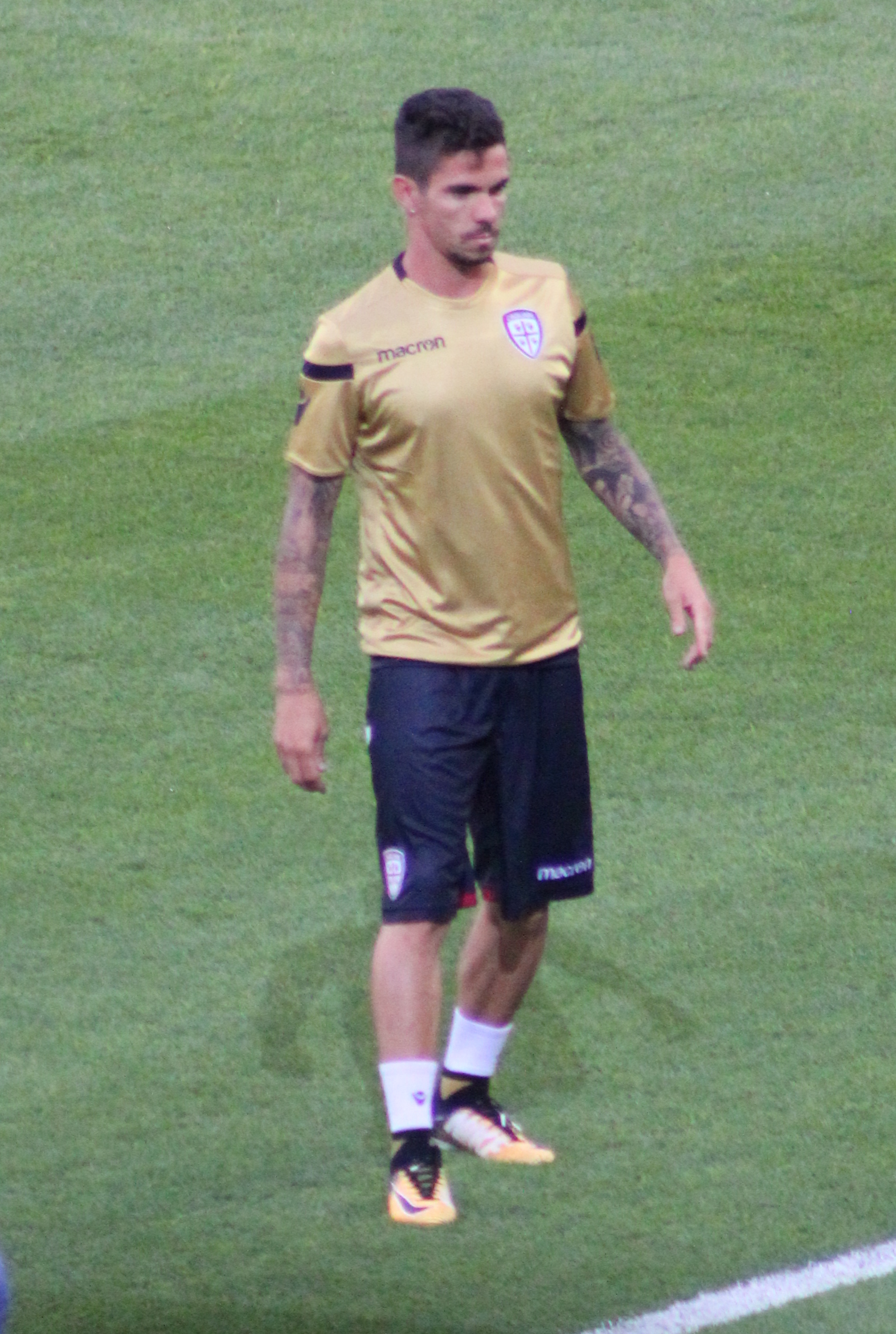
- Farias in 2017

Personal information
- Full name: Diego Farias da Silva
- Date of birth: 10 May 1990 (age 36)
- Place of birth: Sorocaba, Brazil
- Height: 1.72 m (5 ft 8 in)
- Position: Striker

Youth career
- Campo Grande
- 2005–2009: Chievo

Senior career*
Years	Team	Apps	(Gls)
2009–2014	Chievo	0	(0)
2009–2010	→ Verona (loan)	26	(3)
2011	→ Foggia (loan)	15	(3)
2011–2012	→ Nocerina (loan)	40	(5)
2012–2013	→ Padova (loan)	34	(10)
2013–2014	→ Sassuolo (loan)	11	(0)
2014–2021	Cagliari	131	(31)
2019	→ Empoli (loan)	16	(4)
2019–2020	→ Lecce (loan)	18	(2)
2020–2021	→ Spezia (loan)	29	(4)
2022–2023	Benevento	34	(5)
- * Club domestic league appearances and goals as of 19 May 2023

Diego Farias da Silva (born 10 May 1990) is a Brazilian professional footballer who plays as a forward.

== Club career ==
In June 2012, Nocerina excised the rights to sign Sorocaba-born Farias, but Chievo excised the counter-option to keep him in Verona. He signed a new 4+1 contract with club. On 16 July 2012, he joined Calcio Padova on a loan deal for the 2012–13 season.

On 31 January 2019, Farias joined Empoli on loan with an option to buy, after five years at Cagliari.

On 13 August 2019, Farias joined Serie A club Lecce on loan with an option to buy.

On 22 September 2020, Farias joined Spezia on loan until 30 June 2021.

On 2 December 2021, his contract with Cagliari was terminated by mutual consent.

On 14 January 2022, he signed with Benevento in Serie B.

== Career statistics ==
As of match played 23 May 2023.

Appearances and goals by club, season and competition
Club	Season	League			National Cup (Note: Includes Coppa Italia)		Continental		Other		Total	
Club	Season	Division	Apps	Goals	Apps	Goals	Apps	Goals	Apps	Goals	Apps	Goals
Hellas Verona (loan)	2009–10	Lega Pro	26	3	0	0	—		—		26	3
Foggia (loan)	2010–11	Lega Pro	15	3	0	0	—		—		15	3
Nocerina (loan)	2011–12	Serie B	40	5	2	0	—		—		42	5
Padova (loan)	2012–13	Serie B	34	10	2	0	—		—		36	10
Sassuolo (loan)	2013–14	Serie A	11	0	2	1	—		—		13	1
Cagliari	2014–15	Serie A	29	6	3	2	—		—		32	8
Cagliari	2015–16	Serie B	34	14	3	0	—		—		37	14
Cagliari	2016–17	Serie A	20	7	0	0	—		—		20	7
Cagliari	2017–18	Serie A	28	1	2	0	—		—		30	1
Cagliari	2018–19	Serie A	16	3	3	0	—		—		19	3
Cagliari	2021–22	Serie A	4	0	0	0	—		—		4	0
Cagliari	Total		131	31	11	2	0	0	0	0	142	33
Empoli (loan)	2018–19	Serie A	16	4	0	0	—		—		16	4
Lecce (loan)	2019–20	Serie A	18	2	1	0	—		—		19	2
Spezia (loan)	2020–21	Serie A	29	4	3	1	—		—		32	5
Benevento	2021–22	Serie B	13	2	0	0	—		0	0	13	2
Benevento	2022–23	Serie B	21	3	1	0	—		—		22	3
Benevento	Total		34	5	1	0	0	0	0	0	35	5
Career total			355	67	22	4	0	0	0	0	376	71
