= Marco Capuano =

Italian professional footballer

Personal information
- Date of birth: 14 October 1991 (age 35)
- Place of birth: Pescara, Italy
- Height: 1.86 m (6 ft 1 in)
- Position: Centre back

Team information
- Current team: Salernitana
- Number: 19

Youth career
- 1998–2006: Pescara
- 2006–2008: Renato Curi Angolana
- 2008–2009: Torino
- 2009–2010: Pescara

Senior career*
Years	Team	Apps	(Gls)
2010–2015	Pescara	91	(0)
2014–2015	→ Cagliari (loan)	8	(0)
2015–2018	Cagliari	43	(2)
2018	→ Crotone (loan)	16	(0)
2018–2021	Frosinone	65	(3)
2021–2026	Ternana	112	(3)
2026–	Salernitana	2	(0)

International career
2011–2012	Italy U21	18	(0)
- * Club domestic league appearances and goals as of 29 August 2026

Marco Capuano (born 14 October 1991) is an Italian professional footballer who plays as a central defender for Serie C Group C club Salernitana.

== Club career ==
=== Pescara ===
Capuano made his debut with the senior team in the away draw for 1–1 against Frosinone. He obtained 10 appearances in the 2010–11 Serie B season. He also signed a new 3-year contract in December 2010.

During the 2011–12 season, Capuano became a more regular starter under new manager Zdenek Zeman. His run in the starting eleven was soured by a controversial straight red card which led to a penalty in the 20 November match against Gubbio.

He made his Serie A debut on 26 August 2012, in the match lost 3–0 against Inter Milan.

=== Frosinone ===
On 17 August 2018, Capuano signed with Serie A side Frosinone.

=== Ternana ===
On 2 September 2021, he signed a two-year contract with Ternana in Serie B.

== Career statistics ==
As of 6 June 2019

Appearances and goals by club, season and competition
Club	Season	League			National Cup		Continental		Other		Total	
Club	Season	Division	Apps	Goals	Apps	Goals	Apps	Goals	Apps	Goals	Apps	Goals
Pescara	2010–11	Serie B	10	0	0	0	—		—		10	0
Pescara	2011–12	Serie B	32	0	1	0	—		—		33	0
Pescara	2012–13	Serie A	26	0	1	0	—		—		27	0
Pescara	2013–14	Serie B	23	0	2	0	—		—		25	0
Pescara	Total		91	0	4	0	0	0	0	0	95	0
Cagliari (loan)	2014–15	Serie A	8	0	1	0	—		—		9	0
Cagliari	2014–15	Serie A	7	0	0	0	—		—		7	0
Cagliari	2015–16	Serie B	15	0	2	1	—		—		17	1
Cagliari	2016–17	Serie A	12	1	1	0	—		—		13	1
Cagliari	2017–18	Serie A	9	0	2	0	—		—		11	0
Cagliari	Total		51	1	6	1	0	0	0	0	57	2
Crotone (loan)	2017–18	Serie A	16	0	0	0	—		—		16	0
Frosinone (loan)	2018–19	Serie A	27	0	0	0	—		—		27	0
Career total			185	1	10	1	0	0	0	0	195	2
