= Giuseppe Nicolao =

Italian footballer

Personal information
- Date of birth: 5 March 1994 (age 32)
- Place of birth: Nocera Inferiore, Italy
- Height: 1.74 m (5 ft 8 1/2 in)
- Position: Defender

Team information
- Current team: Fidelis Andria
- Number: 38

Youth career
- Napoli

Senior career*
Years	Team	Apps	(Gls)
2013–2017	Napoli	0	(0)
2013–2014	→ Virtus Lanciano (loan)	1	(0)
2014	→ Viareggio (loan)	13	(0)
2014–2015	→ Alessandria (loan)	12	(0)
2015–2017	→ Melfi (loan)	19	(0)
2017	→ Ancona (loan)	6	(0)
2017–2018	Aversa Normanna	26	(2)
2018–2019	Rotonda Calcio	26	(1)
2019–2020	Olympia Agnonese	27	(1)
2020–2021	Pineto	11	(0)
2021	Nardò	22	(3)
2021–2022	Latina	21	(2)
2022–2023	Foggia	26	(3)
2023	Gubbio	14	(0)
2023–2024	Brindisi	14	(1)
2024–2025	Turris	29	(3)
2025	Audace Cerignola	8	(0)
2025–2026	Team Altamura	16	(0)
2026–	Fidelis Andria	0	(0)

International career
2010	Italy U-17	3	(0)
2012–2013	Italy U-19	9	(0)
- * Club domestic league appearances and goals as of 1 May 2026

Giuseppe Nicolao (born 5 March 1994) is an Italian professional footballer who plays as a defender for Serie D club Fidelis Andria.

== Career ==
He made his professional debut in the Serie B for Virtus Lanciano on 24 September 2013 in a game against Juve Stabia.

On 31 January 2022, Nicolao moved to Foggia.

On 24 January 2023, Nicolao signed a 1.5-year contract with Gubbio.

On 24 August 2023, Nicolao moved to Brindisi on a one-year deal.

On 10 January 2024, he signed with Turris.
