= 2012–13 Cagliari Calcio season =

Cagliari Calcio
2012–13 season
- Serie A: 11th
- Coppa Italia: Round of 16
- Top goalscorer: League: Marco Sau (12); All: Marco Sau (12)

The 2012–13 Cagliari Calcio season is the 93rd season in club history.

== Players ==
=== Current squad ===
As of 13 August 2012

Note: Flags indicate national team as defined under FIFA eligibility rules; some limited exceptions apply. Players may hold more than one non-FIFA nationality.

No.	Pos.	Nation	Player
1	GK	ITA	Michael Agazzi
2	DF	ITA	Vincenzo Camilleri (on loan from Reggina)
3	DF	ITA	Lorenzo Ariaudo
4	MF	BEL	Radja Nainggolan
5	MF	ITA	Daniele Conti (captain)
7	MF	ITA	Andrea Cossu
8	DF	BRA	Danilo Avelar (on loan from Karpaty Lviv)
9	FW	ARG	Joaquín Larrivey
13	DF	ITA	Davide Astori
14	DF	ITA	Francesco Pisano
15	DF	ITA	Luca Rossettini
16	MF	SWE	Sebastian Eriksson
18	FW	BRA	Nenê
19	FW	BRA	Thiago Ribeiro

No.	Pos.	Nation	Player
20	MF	SWE	Albin Ekdal
21	MF	ITA	Daniele Dessena
23	FW	COL	Víctor Ibarbo
24	DF	ITA	Gabriele Perico
25	GK	SRB	Vlada Avramov
26	GK	ITA	Riccardo Anedda
27	FW	ITA	Marco Sau
29	DF	ITA	Nicola Murru
30	MF	URU	Pablo Ceppelini
32	MF	ITA	Federico Casarini (on loan from Bologna)
33	MF	ITA	Marco Piredda
34	DF	ITA	Dario Del Fabro
51	FW	CHI	Mauricio Pinilla

=== Out on loan ===
Note: Flags indicate national team as defined under FIFA eligibility rules; some limited exceptions apply. Players may hold more than one non-FIFA nationality.

No.	Pos.	Nation	Player
—	GK	ITA	Marco Ruzittu (at Casale)
—	DF	ITA	Paolo Dametto (at Lumezzane)
—	MF	ITA	Daniele Giorico (at Lumezzane)

No.	Pos.	Nation	Player
—	MF	POR	Rui Sampaio (at (Portugal) Olhanense)
—	MF	ITA	Luigi Sanna (at Sant'Elia)
—	FW	ITA	Mattia Gallon (at Savona)

== Matches ==
=== Legend ===
Win Draw Loss Postponed

=== Serie A ===
Pos	Team	Pld	W	D	L	GF	GA	GD	Pts
9	Inter Milan	38	16	6	16	55	57	−2	54
10	Parma	38	13	10	15	45	46	−1	49
11	Cagliari	38	12	11	15	43	55	−12	47
12	Chievo	38	12	9	17	37	52	−15	45
13	Bologna	38	11	11	16	46	52	−6	44

Source: Serie A, Soccerway
Rules for classification: 1st points; 2nd head-to-head points; 3rd head-to-head goal difference; 4th goal difference; 5th number of goals scored; 6th public draw.
(Head-to-head record is applied for clubs with the same number of points only once all matches between said clubs have been played)

26 August 2012 1	Genoa	2 – 0	Cagliari	Genoa
20:45	Merkel 51'; Immobile 85'	Report	Astori (yellow card) 16'; Dessena (yellow card) 36'; Pinilla (yellow card) 75'	Stadium: Stadio Luigi Ferraris; Attendance: 20,000; Referee: Nicola Rizzoli

2 September 2012 2	Cagliari	1 – 1	Atalanta	Quartu Sant'Elena
20:45	Nainggolan (yellow card) 32'; Conti (yellow card) 47'; Cossu (yellow card) 88'; Ekdal 90+1'	Report	Peluso (yellow card) 13' (yellow-red card) 28'; Denis 81', (yellow card) 90+3'; Stendardo (yellow card) 88'	Stadium: Stadio Is Arenas; Attendance: 0 Referee: Sebastiano Peruzzo

16 September 2012 3	Palermo	1–1	Cagliari	Palermo
15:00	Mantovani (yellow card) 23'; Miccoli (yellow card) 37'; Arévalo Ríos 41'; García (yellow card) 45+1'		Nainggolan (yellow card) 20'; Sau 88'; Pinilla (yellow card) 90+3'	Stadium: Stadio Renzo Barbera

23 September 2012 4	Cagliari	0–3 (by default)	Roma	Quartu Sant'Elena
				Stadium: Stadio Is Arenas

26 September 2012 5	Milan	2–0	Cagliari	Milan
	De Jong (yellow card) 12'; El Shaarawy 16', 82'; Pazzini (yellow card) 63'; De Sciglio (yellow card) 71'		Pisano (yellow card) 3'; Pinilla (yellow card) 37'; Conti (yellow card) 64' (yellow-red card)	Stadium: San Siro

30 September 2012 6	Cagliari	1–2	Pescara	Quartu Sant'Elena
	Pisano (yellow card) 45'; Rossettini (yellow card) 49' (yellow-red card); Ekdal (yellow card) 74'; Pinilla 82' (pen.)		Zanon (yellow card) 25'; Weiss (yellow card) 43', (goal) 76'; Terlizzi 50', (yellow card) 82'; Blasi (yellow card) 77'; Nielsen (yellow card) 85'	Stadium: Stadio Is Arenas

7 October 2012 7	Torino	0–1	Cagliari	Turin
	Darmian (yellow card) 58'		Conti (yellow card) 29'; Ekdal (yellow card) 59'; Nenê 74' (pen.), (yellow card) 89'

21 October 2012 8	Cagliari	1–0	Bologna	Quartu Sant'Elena
	Nainggolan 61'; Dessena (yellow card) 90+1'		Taïder (yellow card) 43'; Kone (yellow card) 66'

28 October 2012 9	Sampdoria	0–1	Cagliari	Genoa
	De Silvestri (yellow card) 41'; Munari (yellow card) 61'		Astori (yellow card) 25'; Ribeiro (yellow card) 30'; Dessena 47'; Conti (yellow card) 50'; Nenê (yellow card) 63'; Avelar (yellow card) 67'; Nainggolan (yellow card) 85'

31 October 2012 10	Cagliari	4–2	Siena	Quartu Sant'Elena
	Nenê 6', 26'; Sau 28'; Nainggolan (yellow card) 33'; Conti (yellow card) 43'; Thiago Ribeiro 89'		Vergassola (yellow card) 17'; Felipe (yellow card) 25'; Neto (yellow card) 38' (yellow-red card); Bogdani 42'; Calaiò 90+2'

4 November 2012 11	Fiorentina	4–1	Cagliari	Florence
	Rodríguez 14'; Roncaglia (yellow card) 36'; Jovetić 50'; Toni 54'; Pizarro (yellow card) 56'; Cuadrado 85'		Casarini 42', (yellow card) 44'

10 November 2012 12	Cagliari	0–0	Catania	Quartu Sant'Elena
	Conti (yellow card) 12'; Dessena (yellow card) 81'; Nainggolan (yellow card) 87'; Astori (yellow card) 90'		Gómez (yellow card) 36'

18 November 2012 13	Inter	2–2	Cagliari	Milan
	Palacio 10'; Cambiasso (yellow card) 26'; Gargano (yellow card) 41'; Astori 82' (o.g.)		Sau (yellow card) 40', (goal) 43', 66'; Nainggolan (yellow card) 50'; Astori (yellow card) 52'; Ekdal (yellow card) 61'; Conti (yellow card) 73'

26 November 2012 14	Cagliari	0–1	Napoli	Quartu Sant'Elena
	Sau (yellow card) 33'; Rossettini (yellow card) 83'; Avelar (yellow card) 90+3'		Džemaili (yellow card) 6'; Hamšík 73'

2 December 2012 15	Udinese	4–1	Cagliari	Udine
	Pereyra 33'; Angella (yellow card) 35', (goal) 39'; Danilo 48'; Pasquale 66'		Nenê (yellow card) 32'; Ekdal (yellow card) 42'; Dessena (yellow card) 52', (goal) 80'; Cossu (yellow card) 75'; Nainggolan (yellow card) 84'

9 December 2012 16	Cagliari	0–2	Chievo	Quartu Sant'Elena
14:00	Ariaudo (yellow card) 15'; Conti (yellow card) 36'; Pinilla (yellow card) 59'; Cossu (yellow card) 73'		Hetemaj (yellow card) 24'; Cesar (yellow card) 61'; Paloschi 67'; Dramé (yellow card) 81'; Théréau 87', (yellow card) 88'	Stadium: Stadio Is Arenas; Attendance: 9000; Referee: Carmine Russo

16 December 2012 17	Parma	4–1	Cagliari	Parma
14:00	Parolo (yellow card) 14'; Belfodil 22', 86'; Paletta (yellow card) 26'; Benalouane (yellow card) 52'; Biabiany 55'; Valdés 65' (pen.); Pavarini (yellow card) 79'		Murru (yellow card) 3'; Sau 20'; Astori (yellow card) 31'; Pisano (yellow card) 40'; Conti (yellow card) 56'; Agazzi (yellow card) 65'; Ribeiro (yellow card) 82'	Stadium: Stadio Ennio Tardini; Attendance: 14,000

21 December 2012 18	Cagliari	1–3	Juventus	Quartu Sant'Elena
19:45	Pinilla 16' (pen.); Ariaudo (yellow card) 20'; Murru (yellow card) 29'; Astori (yellow card) 37' (yellow-red card) 65'; Dessena (yellow card) 57'; Pisano (yellow card) 60'		Vidal (yellow card) 27'; Lichtsteiner (yellow card) 54'; Matri 75', 90+5'; Vučinić 90+4'	Stadium: Stadio Is Arenas; Attendance: 8500; Referee: Antonio Damato

5 January 2013 19	Lazio	2 – 1	Cagliari	Rome
20:45 CET	Dias (yellow card) 44'; Konko 79'; Candreva 86' (pen.)		Dessena (yellow card) 47'; Sau 62'; Agazzi (yellow card) 83' (yellow-red card) 83'; Cossu (red card) 85'	Stadium: Stadio Olimpico; Referee: Daniele Orsato

13 January 2013 20	Cagliari	2 – 1	Genoa	Quartu Sant'Elena
14:00	Dessena (yellow card) 11'; Pisano (yellow card) 21'; Sau 55'; Conti (yellow card) 81', (goal) 82'		Pisano (yellow card) 27', (goal) 48'; Antonelli (yellow card) 51'; Granqvist (yellow card) 71'; Seymour (red card) 84'	Stadium: Stadio Is Arenas; Attendance: 9000; Referee: Gianluca Rocchi

20 January 2013 21	Atalanta	1 – 1	Cagliari	Bergamo
15:00	Denis (yellow card) 32'; Stendardo 57'; Giorgi (yellow card) 67' (yellow-red card)		Canini 2' (o.g.); Ekdal (yellow card) 30'; Avelar (yellow card) 78'	Stadium: Stadio Atleti Azzurri d'Italia; Attendance: 15,000; Referee: Paolo Tagliavento

27 January 2013 22	Cagliari	1 – 1	Palermo	Quartu Sant'Elena
14:00	Conti (yellow card) 23'; Pinilla (yellow card) 45'; Pisano (yellow card) 67'; Ribeiro 90'		Aronica (yellow card) 25'; Iličić 30'; Von Bergen (yellow card) 33'; Muñoz (yellow card) 52'; Dossena (yellow card) 63'; Miccoli (red card) 90+1'; Kurtić (yellow card) 90+4'	Stadium: Stadio Is Arenas; Attendance: 9,000; Referee: Paolo Valeri

1 February 2013 23	Roma	2–4	Cagliari	Rome
19:45	Tachtsidis (yellow card) 33'; Totti 35'; Piris (yellow card) 87'; Lamela (yellow card) 90'; Marquinho 90+3'		Nainggolan 3', (yellow card) 20'; Avelar (yellow card) 27'; Goicoechea 46' (o.g.); Sau 53'; Pisano 71'	Stadium: Stadio Olimpico; Attendance: 32,820; Referee: Andrea Romeo

10 February 2013 24	Cagliari	1–1	Milan	Quartu Sant'Elena
14:00	Ibarbo 45'; Murru (yellow card) 47'; Conti (yellow card) 51'; Astori (yellow card) 67' (yellow-red card) 81'; Dessena (yellow card) 68'		Niang (yellow card) 38'; Mexès (yellow card) 45'; Ambrosini (yellow card) 63'; Balotelli 82' (pen.)	Stadium: Stadio Is Arenas; Attendance: 9,500; Referee: Antonio Giannoccaro

17 February 2013 25	Pescara	0–2	Cagliari	Pescara
14:00	Zauri (yellow card) 23'; Zanon (yellow card) 32'; Rizzo (yellow card) 65'; Blasi (yellow card) 74'; Weiss (red card) 90'		Ekdal (yellow card) 50'; Sau 53', 61'; Cabrera (yellow card) 73'	Stadium: Stadio Adriatico; Attendance: 11,203; Referee: Andrea Gervasoni

24 February 2013 26	Cagliari	4–3	Torino	Quartu Sant'Elena
14:00	Conti (yellow card) 13', (goal) 75', 90+4'; Sau 37' (pen.); Nainggolan (yellow card) 50'; Pinilla 87' (pen.)		Cerci 47'; Stevanović (yellow card) 48', (goal) 54'; Vives (yellow card) 74'; Ogbonna (red card) 86'; Diop (red card) 88'; Bianchi 90+2'	Stadium: Stadio Is Arenas; Attendance: 10,000; Referee: Sebastiano Peruzzo

3 March 2013 27	Bologna	3–0	Cagliari	Bologna
15:00	Taïder 5'; Diamanti 18', (yellow card) 45+1'; Kone (yellow card) 30'; Pasquato 90+2'		Conti (yellow card) 14'; Nainggolan (yellow card) 34'; Sau (yellow card) 40'; Dessena (yellow card) 56'; Pisano (red card) 57'; Pinilla (yellow card) 62'	Stadium: Stadio Renato Dall'Ara; Attendance: 20,000; Referee: Luca Banti

10 March 2013 28	Cagliari	3–1	Sampdoria	Quartu Sant'Elena
14:00	Nainggolan (yellow card) 12'; Ibarbo 18', 53', 72'; Rossettini (red card) 90'		Obiang (yellow card) 13'; López 90+1'	Stadium: Stadio Is Arenas; Referee: Davide Massa

17 March 2013 29	Siena	0–0	Cagliari	Siena
14:00	Della Rocca (yellow card) 85'		Nenê (yellow card) 77'	Stadium: Stadio Artemio Franchi; Attendance: 9,500; Referee: Daniele Doveri

30 March 2013 30	Cagliari	2–1	Fiorentina	Quartu Sant'Elena
14:00	Pinilla 11', 39' (pen.); Pisano (yellow card) 79'; Dessena (yellow card) 84'; Cossu (yellow card) 90'		Rodríguez (yellow card) 25'; Cuadrado (yellow card) 38', (goal) 73'	Stadium: Stadio Is Arenas; Referee: Daniele Orsato

7 April 2013 31	Catania	0–0	Cagliari	Catania
14:00	Bellusci (yellow card) 68'		Cabrera (yellow card) 56'; Nainggolan (yellow card) 59'; Dessena (yellow card) 67'; Pinilla (yellow card) 75'; Ekdal (yellow card) 90'	Stadium: Stadio Angelo Massimino; Attendance: 13,000; Referee: Paolo Valeri

14 April 2013 32	Cagliari	2–0	Inter	Quartu Sant'Elena
14:00	Conti (yellow card) 32'; Pinilla 63' (pen.), 76', (yellow card) 79'; Murru (yellow card) 72'		Juan (yellow card) 9'; Pereira (yellow card) 45'; Silvestre (yellow card) 62'	Stadium: Stadio Is Arenas; Attendance: 10,000; Referee: Domenico Celi

21 April 2013 33	Napoli	3–2	Cagliari	Naples
14:00	Cannavaro (yellow card) 23'; Cavani (yellow card) 45', (goal) 64'; Astori 48' (o.g.); Insigne 90+4'; Behrami (yellow card) 90+6'		Ibarbo 18'; Dessena (yellow card) 43'; Nenê (yellow card) 57'; Nainggolan (yellow card) 64'; Sau 71'; Cabrera (yellow card) 74'; Ekdal (yellow card) 90+6'	Stadium: Stadio San Paolo; Attendance: 38,000; Referee: Andrea De Marco

28 April 2013 34	Cagliari	0–1	Udinese	Quartu Sant'Elena
14:00	Ariado (yellow card) 32'; Nainggolan (yellow card) 59'; Ribeiro (yellow card) 67'; Conti (yellow card) 75'; Ibarbo (yellow card) 82'; Pinilla (red card) 90'		Zielinski (yellow card) 27'; Domizzi (yellow card) 50'; Pereyra 57'; Muriel (yellow card) 88'	Stadium: Stadio Is Arenas; Attendance: 10,000; Referee: Gianluca Rocchi

5 May 2013 35	Chievo	0–0	Cagliari	Verona
14:00	Cesar (yellow card) 41'; Rigoni (yellow card) 63'		Murru (yellow card) 33'; Eriksson (yellow card) 90+3'	Stadium: Stadio Marc'Antonio Bentegodi; Attendance: 11,000; Referee: Riccardo Pinzani

8 May 2013 36	Cagliari	0–1	Parma	Quartu Sant'Elena
14:00			Gobbi (yellow card) 39'; Rosi 80'	Stadium: Stadio Is Arenas; Attendance: 9,000; Referee: Michael Fabbri

12 May 2013 37	Juventus	1–1	Cagliari	Turin
14:00	Vučinić 61'; Chiellini (yellow card) 90+1'		Ibarbo 13'; Murru (yellow card) 33'	Stadium: Juventus Stadium; Attendance: 38,933; Referee: Giampaolo Calvarese

19 May 2013 38	Cagliari	1–0	Lazio	Quartu Sant'Elena
14:00	Dessena (yellow card) 73', (goal) 76'		Cana (yellow card) 37'	Stadium: Stadio Is Arenas; Attendance: 9,000; Referee: Antonio Giannoccaro

=== Coppa Italia ===
18 August 2012 Third Round	Cagliari	2–1	Spezia	Quartu Sant'Elena
	Pinilla 23'; Dessena (yellow card) 70'; Larrivey 90+2'		Porcari (yellow card) 28'; Bovo (yellow card) 53'; Di Gennaro 68' (pen.)

5 December 2012 Fourth Round	Cagliari	4–2	Pescara	Quartu Sant'Elena
17:30	Ribeiro 6', 21', 61'; Pinilla 76'		Cascione 33' (pen.); Weiss 79'

12 December 2012 Round of 16	Juventus	1–0	Cagliari	Turin
20:00	Giovinco 57'		Eriksson (yellow card) 17'; Pinilla (yellow card) 34'; Perico (yellow card) 82'; Ribeiro (yellow card) 90'	Stadium: Juventus Stadium; Referee: Marco Guida

== Squad statistics ==
=== Appearances and goals ===
No.	Pos	Nat	Player	Total		Serie A		Coppa Italia	
No.	Pos	Nat	Player	Apps	Goals	Apps	Goals	Apps	Goals
Goalkeepers
1	GK	(Italy) ITA	Michael Agazzi	35	0	34	0	1	0
25	GK	(Serbia) SRB	Vlada Avramov	7	0	3+2	0	2	0
26	GK	(Italy) ITA	Riccardo Anedda	0	0	0	0	0	0
Defenders
2	DF	(Italy) ITA	Vincenzo Camilleri	1	0	0	0	0+1	0
3	DF	(Italy) ITA	Lorenzo Ariaudo	17	0	15+2	0	0	0
8	DF	(Brazil) BRA	Danilo Avelar	21	0	19+1	0	1	0
13	DF	(Italy) ITA	Davide Astori	33	0	31+1	0	1	0
14	DF	(Italy) ITA	Francesco Pisano	29	1	28	1	1	0
15	DF	(Italy) ITA	Luca Rossettini	31	1	28	1	3	0
24	DF	(Italy) ITA	Gabriele Perico	18	0	12+4	0	2	0
29	DF	(Italy) ITA	Nicola Murru	15	0	13	0	2	0
34	DF	(Italy) ITA	Dario Del Fabro	5	0	1+2	0	2	0
Midfielders
4	MF	(Belgium) BEL	Radja Nainggolan	35	2	33+1	2	1	0
5	MF	(Italy) ITA	Daniele Conti	29	3	29	3	0	0
7	MF	(Italy) ITA	Andrea Cossu	25	0	13+11	0	1	0
16	MF	(Sweden) SWE	Sebastian Eriksson	10	0	1+7	0	2	0
20	MF	(Sweden) SWE	Albin Ekdal	34	1	27+4	1	3	0
21	MF	(Italy) ITA	Daniele Dessena	34	3	28+3	3	2+1	0
22	MF	(Uruguay) URU	Matías Cabrera	7	0	0+7	0	0	0
32	MF	(Italy) ITA	Federico Casarini	11	1	4+7	1	0	0
33	MF	(Italy) ITA	Marco Piredda	2	0	0	0	0+2	0
Forwards
18	FW	(Brazil) BRA	Nenê	23	3	12+11	3	0	0
19	FW	(Brazil) BRA	Thiago Ribeiro	32	5	17+12	2	3	3
23	FW	(Colombia) COL	Víctor Ibarbo	37	6	22+12	6	2+1	0
27	FW	(Italy) ITA	Marco Sau	30	12	23+7	12	0	0
51	FW	(Chile) CHI	Mauricio Pinilla	26	9	12+11	7	2+1	2
Players transferred out during the season
	MF	(Portugal) POR	Rui Sampaio	0	0	0	0	0	0
9	FW	(Argentina) ARG	Joaquín Larrivey	4	1	2+1	0	0+1	1
30	MF	(Uruguay) URU	Pablo Ceppelini	3	0	0+1	0	2	0

Last updated: 28 October 2012
Source: Competitions

=== Top scorers ===
This includes all competitive matches. The list is sorted by shirt number when total goals are equal.

R	No.	Pos	Nat	Name	Serie A	Coppa Italia	Total
1	27	FW	(Italy)	Marco Sau	12	0	12
2	51	FW	(Chile)	Mauricio Pinilla	7	2	9
3	23	FW	(Colombia)	Víctor Ibarbo	6	0	6
4	19	FW	(Brazil)	Thiago Ribeiro	2	3	5
5	5	MF	(Italy)	Daniele Conti	3	0	3
=	18	FW	(Brazil)	Nenê	3	0	3
=	21	MF	(Italy)	Daniele Dessena	3	0	3
8				Own goals	2	0	2
=	4	MF	(Belgium)	Radja Nainggolan	2	0	2
10	9	FW	(Argentina)	Joaquín Larrivey	0	1	1
=	14	DF	(Italy)	Francesco Pisano	1	0	1
=	15	DF	(Italy)	Luca Rossettini	1	0	1
=	20	MF	(Sweden)	Albin Ekdal	1	0	1
=	32	MF	(Italy)	Federico Casarini	1	0	1

Last updated: 28 October 2012
Source: Competitions
