= 2014–15 Cagliari Calcio season =

Cagliari
2014–15 season
- President: Tommaso Giulini
- Manager: Zdeněk Zeman (until 23 December 2014); Gianfranco Zola (from 24 December 2014); Zdeněk Zeman (from 9 March 2015); Gianluca Festa (from 22 April 2015)
- Stadium: Stadio Sant'Elia
- Serie A: 18th (relegated)
- Coppa Italia: Round of 16
- Top goalscorer: League: Marco Sau (7); All: Marco Sau (9)
- Highest home attendance: 16,074 vs Juventus (18 December 2014, Serie A)
- Lowest home attendance: 5,000 vs Udinese (31 May 2015, Serie A) vs Modena (4 December 2014, Coppa Italia)
- Average home league attendance: 10,793
| Home colours | Away colours | Third colours |

The 2014–15 season is Cagliari Calcio's 12th consecutive season in Serie A. The team is competing in Serie A and the Coppa Italia.

== Players ==
=== Squad information ===
Note: Flags indicate national team as defined under FIFA eligibility rules; some limited exceptions apply. Players may hold more than one non-FIFA nationality.

| No. | Pos. | Nation | Player |
|---|---|---|---|
| 1 | GK | ITA | Simone Colombi |
| 2 | DF | ITA | Marco Capuano (on loan from Pescara) |
| 3 | DF | ITA | Nicola Murru |
| 4 | MF | ITA | Lorenzo Crisetig (on loan from Inter) |
| 5 | MF | ITA | Daniele Conti (captain) |
| 7 | MF | ITA | Andrea Cossu (vice-captain) |
| 8 | DF | BRA | Danilo Avelar |
| 9 | FW | ITA | Samuele Longo (on loan from Internazionale) |
| 10 | FW | BRA | Adryan (on loan from Flamengo) |
| 12 | MF | ITA | Alessandro Capello |
| 13 | FW | BRA | Caio Rangel |
| 14 | DF | ITA | Francesco Pisano |
| 15 | DF | ITA | Luca Rossettini |
| 16 | MF | ITA | Daniele Dessena |
| 17 | FW | BRA | Diego Farias (on loan from Chievo) |

| No. | Pos. | Nation | Player |
|---|---|---|---|
| 18 | MF | ITA | Nicolò Barella |
| 19 | FW | ITA | Antonio Loi |
| 20 | MF | SWE | Albin Ekdal |
| 21 | DF | ITA | Antonio Balzano |
| 22 | MF | URU | Matías Cabrera |
| 23 | FW | COL | Víctor Ibarbo |
| 24 | DF | ITA | Simone Benedetti |
| 25 | FW | ITA | Marco Sau |
| 26 | MF | SWE | Sebastian Eriksson |
| 27 | GK | ITA | Alessio Cragno |
| 28 | GK | ITA | Werther Carboni |
| 29 | MF | ITA | Mattia Muroni |
| 30 | MF | GHA | Godfred Donsah |
| — | DF | ITA | Luca Ceppitelli |
| — | MF | ITA | Marco Piredda |

== Competitions ==
=== Serie A ===
==== League table ====
| Pos | Team | Pld | W | D | L | GF | GA | GD | Pts | Qualification or relegation |
|---|---|---|---|---|---|---|---|---|---|---|
| 16 | Udinese | 38 | 10 | 11 | 17 | 43 | 56 | −13 | 41 | |
| 17 | Atalanta | 38 | 7 | 16 | 15 | 38 | 57 | −19 | 37 | |
| 18 | Cagliari (R) | 38 | 8 | 10 | 20 | 48 | 68 | −20 | 34 | Relegation to Serie B |
| 19 | Cesena (R) | 38 | 4 | 12 | 22 | 36 | 73 | −37 | 24 | Relegation to Serie B |
| 20 | Parma (L, R) | 38 | 6 | 8 | 24 | 33 | 75 | −42 | 19 (Note: Parma was docked 7 points for failing to pay over players' wages. Later the club announced bankruptcy, and it was recreated without professional status.) | Relegation to Serie D |

Source: 2014–15 Serie A, 2014-15 Serie A classification.
Rules for classification: 1) points; 2) head-to-head points; 3) head-to-head goal difference; 4) goal difference; 5) number of goals scored; 6) draw. (Head-to-head record is applied for clubs with the same number of points only once all matches between said clubs have been played.).
(L) Liquidated after the season due to bankruptcy.; (R) Relegated

==== Results summary ====
| Overall | | | | | | | | Home | | | | | | Away | | | | | |
| Pld | W | D | L | GF | GA | GD | Pts | W | D | L | GF | GA | GD | W | D | L | GF | GA | GD |
|---|---|---|---|---|---|---|---|---|---|---|---|---|---|---|---|---|---|---|---|
| 38 | 8 | 10 | 20 | 48 | 68 | −20 | 34 | 4 | 4 | 11 | 24 | 36 | −12 | 4 | 6 | 9 | 24 | 32 | −8 |

Last updated: 31 May 2015.
Source: Competitive matches

==== Results by round ====
| Round | 1 | 2 | 3 | 4 | 5 | 6 | 7 | 8 | 9 | 10 | 11 | 12 | 13 | 14 | 15 | 16 | 17 | 18 | 19 | 20 | 21 | 22 | 23 | 24 | 25 | 26 | 27 | 28 | 29 | 30 | 31 | 32 | 33 | 34 | 35 | 36 | 37 | 38 |
|---|---|---|---|---|---|---|---|---|---|---|---|---|---|---|---|---|---|---|---|---|---|---|---|---|---|---|---|---|---|---|---|---|---|---|---|---|---|---|
| Ground | A | H | A | H | A | A | H | A | H | A | H | A | H | H | A | H | A | H | A | H | A | H | A | H | H | A | H | A | H | A | H | A | A | H | A | H | A | H |
| Result | D | L | L | L | W | L | D | W | D | L | D | D | L | L | D | L | L | W | D | W | L | L | D | L | L | L | D | L | L | L | L | W | L | W | D | L | W | W |
| Position | 7 | 13 | 18 | 18 | 14 | 15 | 13 | 13 | 14 | 15 | 15 | 16 | 16 | 18 | 18 | 18 | 18 | 18 | 18 | 17 | 17 | 18 | 18 | 18 | 18 | 18 | 18 | 18 | 19 | 19 | 19 | 18 | 18 | 18 | 18 | 18 | 18 | 18 |

Updated to match(es) played on 31 May 2015. Source: Competitive matches
A = Away; H = Home; W = Win; D = Draw; L = Loss

==== Matches ====
| 31 August 2014 1 | Sassuolo | 1–1 | Cagliari | Reggio Emilia |
| 20:45 CEST (UTC+02:00) | Berardi (yellow card) 34'; Zaza 42', (yellow card) 90+1'; Peluso (yellow card) 86' | Report | Sau 44'; Balzano (yellow card) 49'; Conti (yellow card) 75' | Stadium: Mapei Stadium – Città del Tricolore; Attendance: 11,292; Referee: Paolo Valeri |

| 14 September 2014 2 | Cagliari | 1–2 | Atalanta | Cagliari |
| 15:00 CEST (UTC+02:00) | Conti (yellow card) 24'; Crisetig (yellow card) 40'; Avelar (yellow card) 57'; Ibarbo (yellow card) 72'; Cossu 85' (pen.) | Report | Estigarribia 4', (yellow card) 39'; D'Alessandro (yellow card) 45'; Boakye 67'; Dramé (yellow card) 87'; Cigarini (yellow card) 90+2' | Stadium: Stadio Sant'Elia; Attendance: 9,100; Referee: Angelo Cervellera |

| 21 September 2014 3 | Roma | 2–0 | Cagliari | Rome |
| 15:00 CEST (UTC+02:00) | Destro 10'; Florenzi 13', (yellow card) 17' | Report | Rossettini (yellow card) 60' | Stadium: Stadio Olimpico; Attendance: 40,977; Referee: Sebastiano Peruzzo |

| 24 September 2014 4 | Cagliari | 1–2 | Torino | Cagliari |
| 20:45 CEST (UTC+02:00) | Cossu 11'; Avelar (yellow card) 28'; Rossettini (yellow card) 40' | Report | Glik 21'; Quagliarella 29'; Gazzi (yellow card) 33'; Benassi (yellow card) 87' | Stadium: Stadio Sant'Elia; Attendance: 9,400; Referee: Massimiliano Irrati |

| 28 September 2014 5 | Internazionale | 1–4 | Cagliari | Milan |
| 15:00 CEST (UTC+02:00) | Osvaldo 18'; Nagatomo (yellow card) 25' (yellow-red card) 28'; Guarín (yellow card) 82' | Report | Sau 10', (yellow card) 45'; Ekdal 29', 34', 44'; Rossettini (yellow card) 45'; Balzano (yellow card) 82' | Stadium: San Siro; Attendance: 36,925; Referee: Luca Banti |

| 4 October 2014 6 | Hellas Verona | 1–0 | Cagliari | Verona |
| 18:00 CEST (UTC+02:00) | Tachtsidis (yellow card) 81', (goal) 89' | Report | Dessena (yellow card) 46'; Ibarbo (yellow card) 49'; Rossettini (yellow card) 52' | Stadium: Stadio Marc'Antonio Bentegodi; Attendance: 17,813; Referee: Piero Giacomelli |

| 19 October 2014 7 | Cagliari | 2–2 | Sampdoria | Cagliari |
| 15:00 CEST (UTC+02:00) | Avelar 59' (pen.), (yellow card) 67'; Sau 77'; Benedetti (yellow card) 87'; Cossu (yellow card) 90+3' | Report | Duncan (yellow card) 19'; Gabbiadini 28', (yellow card) 90+3'; Obiang 38'; Cacciatore (yellow card) 48' (yellow-red card) 58'; Palombo (yellow card) 73'; Silvestre (yellow card) 86'; Romagnoli (yellow card) 90' | Stadium: Stadio Sant'Elia; Attendance: 9,426; Referee: Andrea Gervasoni |

| 25 October 2014 8 | Empoli | 0–4 | Cagliari | Empoli |
| 15:00 CEST (UTC+02:00) | Valdifiori (yellow card) 37'; Moro (yellow card) 63' | Report | Sau 31'; Avelar 36', 38' (pen.); Ekdal 45+2'; Crisetig (yellow card) 51'; Farias (yellow card) 86' | Stadium: Stadio Carlo Castellani; Attendance: 8,121; Referee: Luca Pairetto |

| 29 October 2014 9 | Cagliari | 1–1 | Milan | Cagliari |
| 20:45 CET (UTC+01:00) | Avelar (yellow card) 5'; Ibarbo 24'; Crisetig (yellow card) 80'; Ekdal (yellow card) 90' | Report | Muntari (yellow card) 9'; Bonaventura 34'; Rami (yellow card) 56' | Stadium: Stadio Sant'Elia; Attendance: 15,500; Referee: Daniele Doveri |

| 3 November 2014 10 | Lazio | 4–2 | Cagliari | Rome |
| 21:00 CET (UTC+01:00) | Mauri 7'; Klose 25', 26'; De Vrij (yellow card) 43'; Lulić (yellow card) 72'; Ederson 90+2' | Report | Braafheid 48' (o.g.); Ceppitelli (yellow card) 56'; Crisetig (yellow card) 63'; Conti (yellow card) 68'; Ibarbo (red card) 72'; João Pedro 84' | Stadium: Stadio Olimpico; Attendance: 32,569; Referee: Marco Di Bello |

| 9 November 2014 11 | Cagliari | 1–1 | Genoa | Cagliari |
| 12:30 CET (UTC+01:00) | João Pedro (yellow card) 10'; Farias 16'; Conti (yellow card) 39'; Sau (yellow card) 44'; Avelar (yellow card) 69'; Balzano (yellow card) 90+2' | Report | Sturaro (yellow card) 12' (yellow-red card) 76'; Edenílson (yellow card) 19'; Rossettini 53' (o.g.); Antonelli (yellow card) 41'; Burdisso (yellow card) 73' | Stadium: Stadio Sant'Elia; Attendance: 8,000; Referee: Sebastiano Peruzzo |

| 23 November 2014 12 | Napoli | 3–3 | Cagliari | Naples |
| 15:00 CET (UTC+01:00) | Higuaín 11'; Inler 30'; Koulibaly (yellow card) 59'; De Guzmán 62' | Report | Ibarbo 38'; Farias (yellow card) 44', (goal) 47', 68'; Pisano (yellow card) 55' | Stadium: Stadio San Paolo; Attendance: 45,413; Referee: Dino Tommasi |

| 30 November 2014 13 | Cagliari | 0–4 | Fiorentina | Cagliari |
| 15:00 CET (UTC+01:00) | Ibarbo (yellow card) 36'; Ceppitelli (yellow card) 53' | Report | Valero (yellow card) 7'; Fernández 17', 55'; Alonso (yellow card) 31'; Gómez 69'; Cuadrado 74' | Stadium: Stadio Sant'Elia; Attendance: 11,746; Referee: Gianpaolo Calvarese |

| 8 December 2014 14 | Cagliari | 0–2 | Chievo | Cagliari |
| 19:00 CET (UTC+01:00) | Benedetti (yellow card) 23'; Cossu (yellow card) 41'; Conti (yellow card) 51'; Ekdal (yellow card) 56'; Farias (yellow card) 59'; Ibarbo (yellow card) 71' | Report | Meggiorini 3'; Paloschi 9'; Izco (yellow card) 19'; Zukanović (yellow card) 32'; Frey (yellow card) 56' | Stadium: Stadio Sant'Elia; Attendance: 14,500; Referee: Maurizio Mariani |

| 14 December 2014 15 | Parma | 0–0 | Cagliari | Parma |
| 15:00 CET (UTC+01:00) | Rispoli (yellow card) 24'; Santacroce (yellow card) 64'; Acquah (yellow card) 81'; Lucarelli (yellow card) 90+3' | Report | Longo (yellow card) 21'; Conti (yellow card) 47'; Ekdal (yellow card) 84'; Cossu (yellow card) 88' | Stadium: Stadio Ennio Tardini; Attendance: 10,646; Referee: Paolo Valeri |

| 18 December 2014 16 | Cagliari | 1–3 | Juventus | Cagliari |
| 19:00 CET (UTC+01:00) | Rossettini (yellow card) 33', (goal) 65'; Capuano (yellow card) 49'; Avelar (yellow card) 69'; Ceppitelli (yellow card) 90+2' | Report | Tevez 3'; Vidal 15'; Llorente 50' | Stadium: Stadio Sant'Elia; Attendance: 16,074; Referee: Paolo Mazzoleni |

| 6 January 2015 17 | Palermo | 5–0 | Cagliari | Palermo |
| 15:00 CET (UTC+01:00) | Morganella 6'; Muñoz 10', (yellow card) 61'; Maresca (yellow card) 22'; Dybala 33' (pen.), 72'; Vázquez (yellow card) 41'; Barreto 85' | Report | Conti (yellow card) 18' (yellow-red card) 26'; Colombi (yellow card) 32'; Crisetig (yellow card) 38'; Farias (yellow card) 56' | Stadium: Stadio Renzo Barbera; Attendance: 18,268; Referee: Sebastiano Peruzzo |

| 11 January 2015 18 | Cagliari | 2–1 | Cesena | Cagliari |
| 15:00 CET (UTC+01:00) | João Pedro 11'; Rossettini (yellow card) 21'; Donsah 27' | Report | Giorgi (yellow card) 10'; Valzania (yellow card) 19'; Volta (yellow card) 29'; Brienza 89' | Stadium: Stadio Sant'Elia; Attendance: 10,000; Referee: Nicola Rizzoli |

| 18 January 2015 19 | Udinese | 2–2 | Cagliari | Udine |
| 15:00 CET (UTC+01:00) | Kone (yellow card) 20'; Allan 55'; Théréau 56' | Report | Donsah (yellow card) 32'; João Pedro 39'; Longo (yellow card) 44'; Rossettini (yellow card) 57'; Dessena (yellow card) 73'; Avelar 90+1' (pen.) | Stadium: Stadio Friuli; Attendance: 9,366; Referee: Marco Di Bello |

| 24 January 2015 20 | Cagliari | 2–1 | Sassuolo | Cagliari |
| 18:00 CET (UTC+01:00) | Rossettini 20', (yellow card) 57'; Capuano (yellow card) 31'; João Pedro (yellow card) 57'; Čop 79'; Ekdal (yellow card) 81' | Report | Acerbi (yellow card) 35' (yellow-red card) 88', (goal) 76'; Zaza (yellow card) 60'; Floro Flores (yellow card) 78' | Stadium: Stadio Sant'Elia; Attendance: 14,000; Referee: Gianluca Rocchi |

| 31 January 2015 21 | Atalanta | 2–1 | Cagliari | Bergamo |
| 15:00 CET (UTC+01:00) | Biava 18'; Cigarini (yellow card) 19'; Pinilla (yellow card) 22', (goal) 90+4' | Report | González (yellow card) 17'; Dessena 44'; Longo (yellow card) 45' | Stadium: Stadio Atleti Azzurri d'Italia; Attendance: 12,353; Referee: Daniele Orsato |

| 8 February 2015 22 | Cagliari | 1–2 | Roma | Cagliari |
| 15:00 CET (UTC+01:00) | Rossettini (yellow card) 35'; M'Poku (yellow card) 82', (goal) 90+5' | Report | Ljajić 37', (yellow card) 42'; Holebas (yellow card) 79'; Paredes (yellow card) 81', (goal) 85' | Stadium: Stadio Sant'Elia; Attendance: 9,961; Referee: Paolo Tagliavento |

| 15 February 2015 23 | Torino | 1–1 | Cagliari | Turin |
| 15:00 CET (UTC+01:00) | El Kaddouri 35', (yellow card) 63'; Glik (yellow card) 43'; Bovo (yellow card) 55' | Report | Donsah 34'; Conti (yellow card) 54'; Rossettini (yellow card) 57'; João Pedro (yellow card) 89' | Stadium: Stadio Olimpico di Torino; Attendance: 15,554; Referee: Gianpaolo Calvarese |

| 23 February 2015 24 | Cagliari | 1–2 | Internazionale | Cagliari |
| 21:00 CET (UTC+01:00) | Čop (yellow card) 39'; Carrizo 74' (o.g.); Avelar (yellow card) 90+1' | Report | Brozović (yellow card) 13'; Kovačić 47'; Icardi 68'; Campagnaro (yellow card) 89' | Stadium: Stadio Sant'Elia; Attendance: 14,000; Referee: Paolo Mazzoleni |

| 1 March 2015 25 | Cagliari | 1–2 | Hellas Verona | Cagliari |
| 12:30 CET (UTC+01:00) | Murru (yellow card) 45+1'; Conti (yellow card) 54', (goal) 90'; João Pedro (yellow card) 58' | Report | Toni 9'; Juanito 56', (yellow card) 90+4'; Pisano (yellow card) 67'; Greco (yellow card) 90' | Stadium: Stadio Sant'Elia; Attendance: 14,000; Referee: Paolo Valeri |

| 7 March 2015 26 | Sampdoria | 2–0 | Cagliari | Genoa |
| 18:00 CET (UTC+01:00) | De Silvestri 33'; Acquah (yellow card) 41'; Romagnoli (yellow card) 49'; Eto'o 72' | Report | Avelar (yellow card) 35' (yellow-red card) 82'; Cossu (yellow card) 39' | Stadium: Stadio Luigi Ferraris; Attendance: 21,127; Referee: Dino Tommasi |

| 14 March 2015 27 | Cagliari | 1–1 | Empoli | Cagliari |
| 20:45 CET (UTC+01:00) | Farias (yellow card) 8'; João Pedro 20'; Balzano (yellow card) 57' | Report | Zieliński (yellow card) 75'; Vecino 90+3' | Stadium: Stadio Sant'Elia; Attendance: 10,500; Referee: Nicola Rizzoli |

| 21 March 2015 28 | Milan | 3–1 | Cagliari | Milan |
| 20:45 CET (UTC+01:00) | Ménez 21', 78' (pen.); Mexès 49'; De Jong (yellow card) 73' | Report | Crisetig (yellow card) 31'; González (yellow card) 45+2'; Farias 47', (yellow card) 50'; Ceppitelli (yellow card) 77' | Stadium: San Siro; Attendance: 30,748; Referee: Paolo Tagliavento |

| 4 April 2015 29 | Cagliari | 1–3 | Lazio | Cagliari |
| 15:00 CEST (UTC+02:00) | Sau 49'; Crisetig (yellow card) 60'; Rossettini (yellow card) 63'; Diakité (red card) 68'; M'Poku (yellow card) 78'; Balzano (yellow card) 90+1' | Report | Parolo (yellow card) 15', (goal) 90+2'; Maurício (yellow card) 22'; Klose 31'; Basta (yellow card) 55'; Biglia 60' (pen.); Keita (yellow card) 85' | Stadium: Stadio Sant'Elia; Attendance: 11,000; Referee: Gianluca Rocchi |

| 11 April 2015 30 | Genoa | 2–0 | Cagliari | Genoa |
| 18:00 CEST (UTC+02:00) | Edenílson (yellow card) 10'; Niang 52', (yellow card) 57'; Falque 58' | Report | Dessena (yellow card) 9'; Ceppitelli (yellow card) 45+1'; Crisetig (yellow card) 88' | Stadium: Stadio Luigi Ferraris; Attendance: 17,727; Referee: Carmine Russo |

| 19 April 2015 31 | Cagliari | 0–3 | Napoli | Cagliari |
| 18:00 CEST (UTC+02:00) | Conti (yellow card) 44'; Longo (yellow card) 61'; Rossettini (yellow card) 64'; Ceppitelli (yellow card) 69' | Report | Koulibaly (yellow card) 4'; Maggio (yellow card) 11' (yellow-red card) 65'; Callejón 24'; Balzano 45+1' (o.g.); Gabbiadini 59' | Stadium: Stadio Sant'Elia; Attendance: 8,000; Referee: Paolo Valeri |

| 26 April 2015 32 | Fiorentina | 1–3 | Cagliari | Florence |
| 18:00 CEST (UTC+02:00) | Valero (yellow card) 9'; Gilardino 74' | Report | Čop 7', 59'; Avelar (yellow card) 21'; Ekdal (yellow card) 63'; Murru (yellow card) 72'; Farias (yellow card) 72', (goal) 90+2'; Sau (yellow card) 83' | Stadium: Stadio Artemio Franchi; Attendance: 27,560; Referee: Marco Guida |

| 29 April 2015 33 | Chievo | 1–0 | Cagliari | Verona |
| 20:45 CEST (UTC+02:00) | Meggiorini 11'; Schelotto (yellow card) 49'; Botta (yellow card) 88' | Report | Ceppitelli (yellow card) 55'; Ekdal (yellow card) 60'; M'Poku (yellow card) 75'; Cossu (yellow card) 81' (yellow-red card) 89'; Murru (red card) 84' | Stadium: Stadio Marc'Antonio Bentegodi; Attendance: 9,000; Referee: Marco Di Bello |

| 4 May 2015 34 | Cagliari | 4–0 | Parma | Cagliari |
| 20:45 CEST (UTC+02:00) | Ekdal 3'; Farias 14'; M'Poku (yellow card) 35', (goal) 38'; Dessena (yellow card) 37'; Čop 63'; Barella (yellow card) 86' | Report | Coda (yellow card) 40' | Stadium: Stadio Sant'Elia; Attendance: 9,000; Referee: Massimiliano Irrati |

| 9 May 2015 35 | Juventus | 1–1 | Cagliari | Turin |
| 18:00 CEST (UTC+02:00) | Pogba 45'; Marchisio (yellow card) 57' | Report | Avelar (yellow card) 32'; João Pedro (yellow card) 50'; Rossettini 85' | Stadium: Juventus Stadium; Attendance: 38,847; Referee: Sebastiano Peruzzo |

| 17 May 2015 36 | Cagliari | 0–1 | Palermo | Cagliari |
| 15:00 CEST (UTC+02:00) | Balzano (yellow card) 55'; Ekdal (yellow card) 80'; Diakité (yellow card) 81' | Report | Rigoni (yellow card) 6'; Vázquez 9'; Chochev (yellow card) 12'; González (yellow card) 81' | Stadium: Stadio Sant'Elia; Attendance: 6,000; Referee: Angelo Cervellera |

| 24 May 2015 37 | Cesena | 0–1 | Cagliari | Cesena |
| 15:00 CEST (UTC+02:00) | De Feudis (yellow card) 15'; Lucchini (yellow card) 39'; Cascione (yellow card) 67' | Report | Sau 90+1' | Stadium: Stadio Dino Manuzzi; Attendance: 13,945; Referee: Eugenio Abbattista |

| 31 May 2015 38 | Cagliari | 4–3 | Udinese | Cagliari |
| 18:00 CEST (UTC+02:00) | Sau 13'; João Pedro 19'; M'Poku 79'; Fernandes 85' (o.g.); Avelar (yellow card) 90' | Report | Wagué (yellow card) 16'; Danilo (yellow card) 28'; Aguirre 44', (yellow card) 54'; Fernandes (yellow card) 62', (goal) 81'; Théréau 88' | Stadium: Stadio Sant'Elia; Attendance: 5,000; Referee: Gianluca Manganiello |

=== Coppa Italia ===
| 23 August 2014 Third round | Cagliari | 2–0 | Catania | Cagliari |
| 21:00 CEST (UTC+02:00) | Sau 5'; Farias 16' | | Rinaudo (red card) 72' | Stadium: Stadio Sant'Elia; Attendance: 9,360; Referee: Andrea Gervasoni |

| 4 December 2014 Fourth round | Cagliari | 4–4 (a.e.t.) (5–4 p) | Modena | Cagliari |
| 18:00 CET (UTC+01:00) | Conti 59' (pen.), (yellow card) 76'; Longo 90+3', 101'; Murru (yellow card) 108'; Farias 119' | Report | Cragno 6' (o.g.); Manfredini (yellow card) 59'; Luppi 68'; Martinelli (yellow card) 90+3'; Granoche 98', 109' | Stadium: Stadio Sant'Elia; Attendance: 5,000; Referee: Aleandro Di Paolo |
| | Penalties |
| | Conti (penalty missed); Rossettini (penalty scored); Farias (penalty scored); João Pedro (penalty scored); Crisetig (penalty missed); Longo (penalty scored); Murru (penalty scored) | | (penalty scored) Schiavone; (penalty scored) Nizzetto; (penalty scored) Granoche; (penalty missed) Gatto; (penalty missed) Osuji; (penalty scored) Marzorati; (penalty missed) Cionek |

| 14 January 2015 Round of 16 | Parma | 2–1 | Cagliari | Parma |
| 18:00 CET (UTC+01:00) | Felipe (yellow card) 32'; Paletta 45'; Mariga (yellow card) 54'; Rispoli 84' | Report | Murru (yellow card) 24'; Barella (yellow card) 33'; González (yellow card) 58'; Sau 69' | Stadium: Stadio Ennio Tardini; Attendance: 1,083; Referee: Angelo Cervellera |

== Statistics ==
| | Total | Home | Away | Neutral |
|---|---|---|---|---|
| Games played | | | | |
| Games won | | | | |
| Games drawn | | | | |
| Games lost | | | | |
| Biggest win | | | | |
| Biggest loss | | | | |
| Biggest win (League) | | | | |
| Biggest win (Cup) | | | | |
| Biggest loss (League) | | | | |
| Biggest loss (Cup) | | | | |
| Clean sheets | | | | |
| Goals scored | | | | |
| Goals conceded | | | | |
| Goal difference | | | | |
| Average GF per game | | | | |
| Average GA per game | | | | |
| Yellow cards | | | | |
| Red cards | | | | |
| Most appearances | | | | |
| Top scorer | | | | |
| Worst discipline | | | | |
| Penalties for | | | | |
| Penalties against | | | | |
| League points | | | | |
| Winning rate | | | | |

=== Appearances and goals ===
| No. | Pos | Nat | Player | Total | | Serie A | | Coppa Italia | |
| No. | Pos | Nat | Player | Apps | Goals | Apps | Goals | Apps | Goals |
Goalkeepers
| 1 | GK | (Italy) ITA | Simone Colombi | 3 | 0 | 3 | 0 | 0 | 0 |
| 27 | GK | (Italy) ITA | Alessio Cragno | 14 | 0 | 14 | 0 | 0 | 0 |
| 28 | GK | (Italy) ITA | Werther Carboni | 0 | 0 | 0 | 0 | 0 | 0 |
| 44 | GK | (Serbia) SRB | Željko Brkić | 21 | 0 | 21 | 0 | 0 | 0 |
Defenders
| 2 | DF | (Uruguay) URU | Alejandro González | 7 | 0 | 6+1 | 0 | 0 | 0 |
| 3 | DF | (Italy) ITA | Nicola Murru | 8 | 0 | 6+2 | 0 | 0 | 0 |
| 8 | DF | (Brazil) BRA | Danilo Avelar | 31 | 4 | 29+2 | 4 | 0 | 0 |
| 14 | DF | (Italy) ITA | Francesco Pisano | 13 | 0 | 12+1 | 0 | 0 | 0 |
| 15 | DF | (Italy) ITA | Luca Rossettini | 32 | 3 | 32 | 3 | 0 | 0 |
| 21 | DF | (Italy) ITA | Antonio Balzano | 25 | 0 | 21+4 | 0 | 0 | 0 |
| 32 | DF | (Italy) ITA | Luca Ceppitelli | 25 | 0 | 22+3 | 0 | 0 | 0 |
| 33 | DF | (Italy) ITA | Marco Capuano | 15 | 0 | 12+3 | 0 | 0 | 0 |
| 37 | DF | (France) FRA | Modibo Diakité | 9 | 0 | 8+1 | 0 | 0 | 0 |
Midfielders
| 4 | MF | (Italy) ITA | Lorenzo Crisetig | 28 | 0 | 26+2 | 0 | 0 | 0 |
| 5 | MF | (Italy) ITA | Daniele Conti | 18 | 1 | 17+1 | 1 | 0 | 0 |
| 7 | MF | (Italy) ITA | Andrea Cossu | 22 | 2 | 19+3 | 2 | 0 | 0 |
| 16 | MF | (Italy) ITA | Daniele Dessena | 28 | 1 | 21+7 | 1 | 0 | 0 |
| 18 | MF | (Italy) ITA | Nicolò Barella | 3 | 0 | 1+2 | 0 | 0 | 0 |
| 20 | MF | (Sweden) SWE | Albin Ekdal | 33 | 5 | 32+1 | 5 | 0 | 0 |
| 22 | MF | (Czech Republic) CZE | Josef Hušbauer | 2 | 0 | 0+2 | 0 | 0 | 0 |
| 30 | MF | (Ghana) GHA | Godfred Donsah | 21 | 2 | 13+8 | 2 | 0 | 0 |
| 40 | MF | (Democratic Republic of the Congo) COD | Paul-José M'Poku | 16 | 3 | 14+2 | 3 | 0 | 0 |
Forwards
| 9 | FW | (Italy) ITA | Samuele Longo | 27 | 0 | 9+18 | 0 | 0 | 0 |
| 10 | FW | (Brazil) BRA | João Pedro | 29 | 5 | 15+14 | 5 | 0 | 0 |
| 13 | FW | (Brazil) BRA | Caio Rangel | 6 | 0 | 0+6 | 0 | 0 | 0 |
| 17 | FW | (Brazil) BRA | Diego Farias | 29 | 6 | 20+9 | 6 | 0 | 0 |
| 25 | FW | (Italy) ITA | Marco Sau | 28 | 7 | 20+8 | 7 | 0 | 0 |
| 90 | FW | (Croatia) CRO | Duje Čop | 16 | 4 | 9+7 | 4 | 0 | 0 |
Players transferred out during the season
| 12 | FW | (Italy) ITA | Alessandro Capello | 0 | 0 | 0 | 0 | 0 | 0 |
| 19 | MF | (Italy) ITA | Antonio Loi | 0 | 0 | 0 | 0 | 0 | 0 |
| 23 | FW | (Colombia) COL | Víctor Ibarbo | 13 | 2 | 12+1 | 2 | 0 | 0 |
| 24 | DF | (Italy) ITA | Simone Benedetti | 5 | 0 | 4+1 | 0 | 0 | 0 |
| 26 | MF | (Sweden) SWE | Sebastian Eriksson | 0 | 0 | 0 | 0 | 0 | 0 |

Last updated: 30 May 2015
Source: BDFutbol
