= Danilo Avelar =

Brazilian footballer (born 1989)

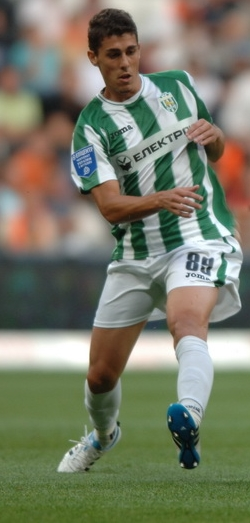
- Avelar playing for Karpaty Lviv in 2011

Personal information
- Full name: Danilo Fernando Avelar
- Date of birth: 9 June 1989 (age 37)
- Place of birth: Paranavaí, Brazil
- Height: 1.85 m (6 ft 1 in)
- Position: Left-back

Youth career
- 2004–2005: Paranavaí
- 2006: Joinville
- 2007: Paraná

Senior career*
Years	Team	Apps	(Gls)
2008–2010	Rio Claro	28	(2)
2010–2012	Karpaty Lviv	23	(2)
2011	→ Schalke 04 (loan)	3	(0)
2011	→ Schalke 04 II (loan)	4	(0)
2012–2015	Cagliari	71	(4)
2016–2019	Torino	9	(0)
2017–2018	→ Amiens (loan)	21	(1)
2018–2019	→ Corinthians (loan)	40	(5)
2019–2022	Corinthians	34	(5)
2022	→ América Mineiro (loan)	23	(1)
2023–2024	América Mineiro	42	(4)
- * Club domestic league appearances and goals as of 16:24, 2 March 2023 (UTC)

Danilo Fernando Avelar (born 9 June 1989) is a Brazilian professional footballer who plays as a left-back and centre back.

== Club career ==
=== Early career ===
Avelar began his career in Brazil. Avelar played for Paranavaí, Joinville, Paraná Clube and Rio Claro.

=== Karpaty Lviv ===
On 10 May 2010, he joined Karpaty Lviv in Ukrainian Premier League on loan until December 2010. Avelar impressed enough and signed for the club permanently in 2010.

==== Schalke (loan) ====
In January 2011, he joined FC Schalke 04 on loan, the new head coach of FC Schalke 04 announced on 23 March 2011 that the club would not be taking up the option to sign Avelar on a permanent deal, during his time at FC Schalke 04, Avelar won the DFB-Pokal Cup. Avelar returned on 30 June 2011 to his club Karpaty Lviv.

=== Cagliari ===
On 17 July 2012, Avelar transferred to Cagliari on loan with the option of a permanent transfer. He made his debut in Serie A on 26 August 2012 in a 2–0 loss against Genoa. After going through a difficult start (the then Sardinian coach Massimo Ficcadenti preferred the defender Francesco Pisano in his role) with the arrival of the coaches Ivo Pulga and Diego López he won a permanent place among the starters thanks to his gradually more convincing performances. In the latter part of the season he was dropped in favour of the young full-back Nicola Murru, due to small physical problems and the exponential growth of the latter. At the end of the season the option to buy was exercised by the Sardinian club at a cost of 1 million euros.

In the 2013–2014 season, he lost the starting spot again to Murru, finding scant attention in the first half of the season. On 31 January 2014 a loan move to Sky Bet Championship side Leeds United failed due to logistic problems between the two companies involved. However, in the second half of the season he made 15 appearances, starting in the match against Inter Milan on match day 25th of the Italian Serie A. His starting spot duel with Murru continued till the end of the season.

On 19 October 2014 he scored his first goal for Cagliari in their Serie A match at home to Sampdoria which ended 2–2, turning in the penalty that opened the scoring for Cagliari, at which point they were behind 2–0. A week later, however, he scored his first brace in the Italian top flight - the first goal a free kick, the second a penalty - in the 4–0 win which saw the Rossoblu impose themselves on Empoli.

=== Torino ===
On 17 June 2015, Torino released a statement confirming they had signed Avelar to a four-year contract for an undisclosed fee and an option on Antonio Barreca.

On 31 August 2017, Avelar was loaned to Ligue 1 side Amiens for one season.

== Style of play ==
Naturally left-footed, he plays mainly on the left side of defence in a full back role or in a more attacking role as a wide midfielder, given his offensive skills.

== Career statistics ==
=== Club ===
As of 2 March 2023

Club	Season	League			State League		Cup		Continental		Other		Total	
Club	Season	Division	Apps	Goals	Apps	Goals	Apps	Goals	Apps	Goals	Apps	Goals	Apps	Goals
Rio Claro	2008	Paulista	—		0	0	—		—		0	0	0	0
Rio Claro	2009	Paulista A2	—		15	2	—		—		—		15	2
Rio Claro	2010	Paulista	—		13	0	—		—		—		13	0
Rio Claro	Total		—		28	2	—		—		—		28	2
Karpaty Lviv	2010–11	Ukrainian Premier League	18	0	—		2	0	11 (Note: All appearances in UEFA Europa League)	0	—		31	0
Karpaty Lviv	2011–12	Ukrainian Premier League	5	2	—		2	1	1	0	—		8	3
Karpaty Lviv	Total		23	2	—		4	1	12	0	—		39	3
Schalke 04 (loan)	2010–11	Bundesliga	3	0	—		—		—		—		3	0
Schalke 04 II (loan)	2010–11	Regionalliga West	4	0	—		—		—		—		4	0
Cagliari	2012–13	Serie A	20	0	—		1	0	—		—		21	0
Cagliari	2013–14	Serie A	20	0	—		0	0	—		—		20	0
Cagliari	2014–15	Serie A	31	4	—		1	0	—		—		32	4
Cagliari	Total		71	4	—		2	0	—		—		73	4
Torino	2015–16	Serie A	6	0	—		2	0	—		—		8	0
Torino	2016–17	Serie A	3	0	—		0	0	—		—		3	0
Torino	Total		9	0	—		2	0	—		—		12	0
Amiens (loan)	2017–18	Ligue 1	21	1	—		4	0	—		—		25	1
Corinthians	2018	Série A	19	1	—		6	1	2 (Note: All appearances in Copa Libertadores)	0	—		27	2
Corinthians	2019	Série A	20	2	16	4	6	1	8 (Note: All appearances in Copa Sudamericana)	0	—		50	7
Corinthians	2020	Série A	13	2	6	1	0	0	0	0	—		19	3
Corinthians	2021	Série A	0	0	0	0	0	0	0	0	—		0	0
Corinthians	Total		52	5	22	5	12	2	10	0	—		96	12
América Mineiro	2022	Série A	19	0	—		4	1	—		—		23	1
América Mineiro	2023	Série A	0	0	3	0	1	0	0	0	—		4	0
América Mineiro	Total		19	0	3	0	5	1	0	0	—		27	1
Career total			192	12	53	7	29	4	22	0	0	0	301	23

== Honours ==
=== Club ===
Schalke 04

- DFB-Pokal: 2010–11

Corinthians

- Campeonato Paulista: 2019

=== Individual ===
- Campeonato Paulista Team of the Year: 2019
