= Davide Astori =

Italian footballer (1987–2018)

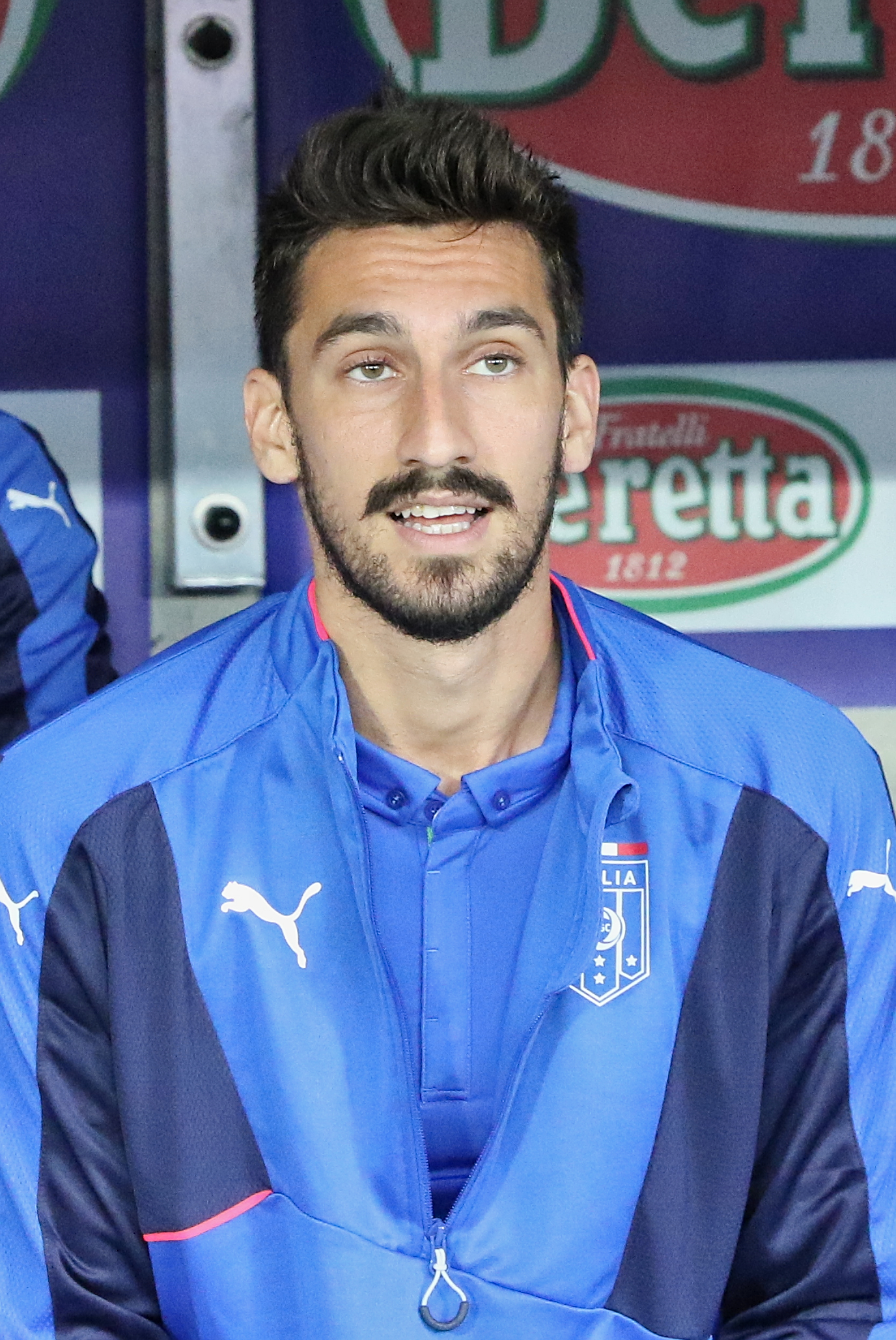
- Astori with Italy in 2015

Personal information
- Date of birth: 7 January 1987
- Place of birth: San Giovanni Bianco, Lombardy, Italy
- Date of death: 4 March 2018 (aged 31)
- Place of death: Udine, Italy
- Height: 1.88 m (6 ft 2 in)
- Position: Centre-back

Youth career
- Pontisola
- 2001–2006: AC Milan

Senior career*
Years	Team	Apps	(Gls)
2006–2008	AC Milan	0	(0)
2006–2007	→ Pizzighettone (loan)	25	(1)
2007–2008	→ Cremonese (loan)	31	(0)
2008–2016	Cagliari	174	(3)
2014–2015	→ Roma (loan)	24	(1)
2015–2016	→ Fiorentina (loan)	33	(0)
2016–2018	Fiorentina	58	(3)
Total		345	(8)

International career
2004–2005	Italy U18	4	(0)
2011–2017	Italy	14	(1)
Medal record
Representing Italy
Association football
FIFA Confederations Cup
Third place	2013 Brazil
- * Club domestic league appearances and goals

Davide Astori (Italian pronunciation: [ˈdaːvide aˈstɔːri, - aˈstoːri]; 7 January 1987 – 4 March 2018) was an Italian professional footballer who played as a central defender.

After playing youth football for Pontisola and AC Milan, Astori started his senior career at Serie C clubs Pizzighettone and Cremonese, playing one season for each while on loan from Milan. In 2008, Cagliari signed him in a co-ownership deal, before signing him fully from Milan, for whom he never made a first team appearance, in 2011. He later spent loan spells at Roma and Fiorentina, before signing with the latter club permanently in 2016; he was subsequently named the team's captain in 2017.

Astori made his international debut for Italy in 2011 and represented his country on 14 occasions, scoring one goal, which came in the 2013 FIFA Confederations Cup third place play off, where he won a bronze medal.

On 4 March 2018, Astori was found dead in his hotel room prior to a league match. His autopsy revealed cardiac arrest as his cause of death.

== Club career ==
=== Early career ===
Born and raised in the province of Bergamo, Astori started playing football with local team Pontisola before joining AC Milan in 2001. He spent five years in the club's youth system. Astori later reflected on his development, saying: "After a year of courtship, of auditions, I came to wear the AC Milan shirt with the very young regional players. Along with twelve, thirteen new players. There was always a lot of change. I'm from San Giovanni Bianco, so it was already an adventure. But the greatest memories are precisely due to transfers with teammates, making the return from training. They were beautiful years, lived positively, for a boy there was no better experience. Honestly, it is difficult to get out of balance, because in fifty professional clubs there are twenty boys for each team in the youth sector, so every word is illusory. I have always believed in it and hoped for it, growing from year to year until it becomes one."

Astori was sent on two consecutive loan spells to Serie C1 clubs Pizzighettone and Cremonese for the 2006–07 and 2007–08 seasons, respectively.

=== Cagliari ===
At the beginning of the 2008–09 season, Astori was signed by Serie A club Cagliari in a co-ownership deal with Milan, for €1 million. Upon joining the club, he said: "For me, it's an adventure which I undertake with great desire to test myself, learn and grow. I will be ready if and when the coach's call arrives."

Astori made his official debut in the top-flight during an away game against Siena on 14 September 2008, coming on as a 53rd-minute substitute, in a 2–0 loss. Since making his debut for the club, he spent most of the season on the substitute bench throughout the season. But Astori made six starts for Cagliari, all of them were centre–back position. At the end of the 2008–09 season, Astori made eleven appearances for the side.

In June 2009, the club renewed their ownership with A.C. Milan to keep Astori at Cagliari for another year. At the start of the 2009–10 season, he replaced Diego López and quickly became a first team regular, playing in the centre–back position. Astori then helped the club keep three consecutive clean sheets between 28 October 2009 and 8 November 2009. He then scored his first goal for the club in a 2–2 draw against Fiorentina on 31 January 2010. A month later on 28 February 2010, Astori scored his second goal in a 2–1 loss against Chievo. On 3 April 2010, Astori scored an own goal against A.C. Milan to allow Milan scored the third goal in the match which Cagliari lost 3–2. Despite missing three matches during the 2009–10 season, Astori made thirty–five appearances and scoring two times in all competitions.

Over the summer, rumours spread when A.C. Milan was keen to sign Astori but nothing happened. Despite the rumours, Astori was keen to rejoin A.C. Milan in the summer. The club renewed their ownership with A.C. Milan to keep Astori at Cagliari for another year in June 2010. At the start of the 2010–11 season, he helped the side keep three clean sheets in the first five league matches. Since the start of the 2010–11 season, Astori continued to regain his first team place in the centre–back position, forming a partnership with Michele Canini. He also started in every match until missing one match for picking up five yellow cards and served a suspension against Catania on 12 December 2010. After serving a one match suspension, Astori returned to the starting line–up against Cesena on 18 December 2010, starting the whole game, in a 1–0 loss. Following his return, he continued to start in the centre–back position for the next twelve matches. This lasted until Astori was suspended for the second time for picking another five yellow cards and served a suspension against Napoli on 20 March 2011. After serving a one match suspension, Astori returned to the starting line–up against Genoa on 3 April 2011 and helped the side keep a clean sheet, in a 1–0 win. In a follow–up matcha against Brescia, he set up the club's opening goal of the game, in a 1–0 win. In the last game of the season against Parma, Astori set up the equalising goal, in a 1–1 draw to end Cagliari's four match losing streak. At the end of the 2010–11 season, he made thirty–six appearances in all competitions.

On 22 June 2011, the club bought the residual 50% registration rights from Milan for another €3.5 million. (pre-agreed €1 million tagged in 2008 and additional €2.5 million) At the start of the 2011–12 season, Astori started in the first eight league matches, playing in the centre–back position, continuing to partner with Canini. However, he suffered a fractured foot in a match against Napoli on 23 October 2011 following an intervention by Ezequiel Lavezzi and have to come off on the 21 minutes in a 0–0 draw. His injury resulted in his being out for 3 months. After the match, Astori revealed that Lavezzi personally apologised for injuring him. On 8 January 2012, he returned to the starting line–up, in a 3–0 win against Genoa. Since returning from injury, Astori regained his first team place, playing in the centre–back position, for the next twelve matches. But he missed one match for picking up five yellow cards and served a suspension against Atalanta on 1 April 2012. On 7 April 2012, Astori returned to the starting line–up against Inter Milan and scored his first goal of the season, in a 2–2 draw. He later regained his first team place, playing in the centre–back position, for the rest of the season. At the end of the 2011–12 season, Astori made twenty–nine appearances and scoring once in all competitions.

On 9 July 2012, Astori revealed he turned down a move to Russian side Spartak Moscow worth a €15 million (£11.9 million) fee after agreement between two clubs. Instead, Astori signed a contract with Cagliari that keep him until 2016. Astori explained turning down a move to Spartak Moscow because he wanted to stay at Cagliari and achieve his goals with the club. At the start of the 2012–13 season, Astori appeared in the first two league matches for Cagliari before being dropped from the squad for the next two league matches, due to sustaining a muscle injury while at international duty. He then returned to the starting line–up, starting the whole game, in a 2–0 loss against AC Milan on 26 September 2012. Astori then helped the club keep three clean sheets between 7 October 2012 and 28 October 2012. But he was suspended on two occasions, including his sending off for a second bookable offence, in a 3–1 los against Juventus on 21 December 2012. In the January transfer window, Astori was linked with a move to Premier League side Southampton, but the move fell through and he stayed at the club. Astori was once again sent–off for the second time for a second bookable offence, in a 1–1 draw against AC Milan on 10 February 2013. He then captained for Cagliari for the first time in his career against Napoli on 21 April 2013, as they lost 3–2. Despite being sidelined throughout the 2012–13 season, Astori continued to regain his first team place, playing in the centre–back position. He went on to make thirty–three appearances in all competitions.

Ahead of the 2013–14 season, Astori was linked a move away from Cagliari with Napoli interested in signing him. But he ended up staying at the club. As a result, Astori was dropped to the substitute bench amid to his future at Cagliari. On 15 September 2013, he made his first league appearance of the season, starting the whole game, in a 1–1 draw against Fiorentina. Since the start of the 2013–14 season, Astori continued to regain his first team place, playing in the centre–back position. He then captained the side for the first time in the 2013–14 season against Parma on 15 December 2013 and helped the side keep a clean sheet, in a 0–0 draw. In a follow–up match against Napoli, Astori set up the opening goal of the game, in a 1–1 draw. After missing a match against Livorno on 16 February 2014 due to "muscle ache in the rectus femoris of the left leg", he returned to the starting line–up and captained for Cagliari in the next two matches, earning four points for the side. But after serving a one match suspension for picking another five yellow cards and served a suspension against Lazio on 16 March 2014, Astori returned to the starting line–up and captained Cagliari in the next two matches, earning three points for the side. Having captained the total of six times in the 2013–14 season, Cagliari News 24 made an assessment of Astori's performance, as he alternated good matches with less good performances. As the season was concluded, Astori went on to make thirty–five appearances in all competitions.

=== Roma ===
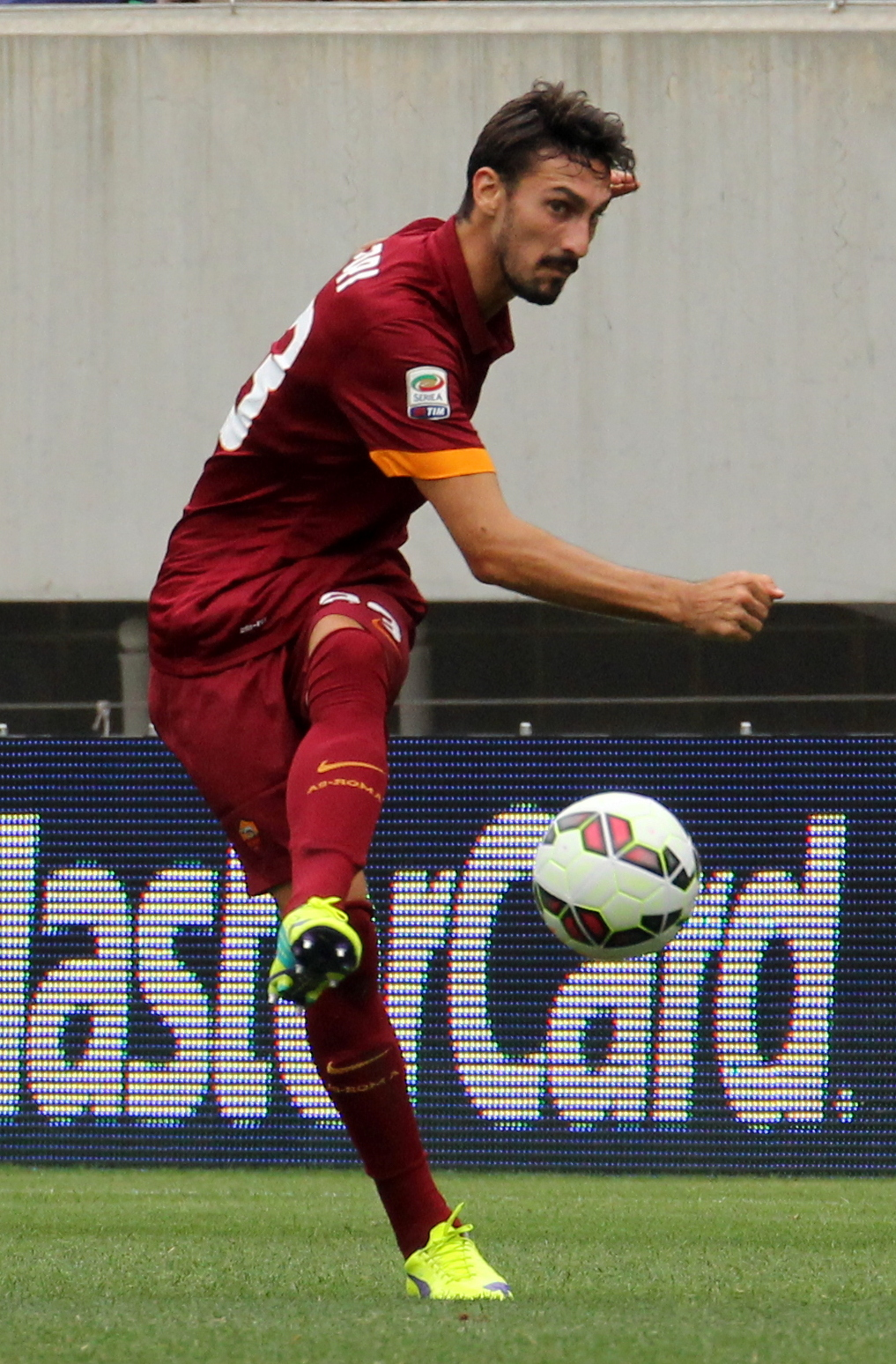
Astori playing for Roma in August 2014.

On 24 July 2014, Cagliari announced Astori's move to Roma on a season-long loan deal. The transfer was settled in €2 million and Roma held the option to make it permanent at the end of the season for another €5 million. It came after when Astori renewed his contract with Cagliari a day before the Roma transfer.

Astori made his Roma debut in the opening game of the season against Fiorentina and helped the side keep a clean sheet, in a 2–0 win. Two weeks later on 17 September 2014, he made his UEFA Champions League debut, starting the whole game, in a 5–1 win against CSKA Moscow. However, after the match, Astori suffered a knee injury that kept him out for three weeks. On 18 October 2014, he returned to the starting line–up against ChievoVerona and helped Roma keep a clean sheet by winning 3–0. Astori then followed up by keeping two clean sheets in the next two matches against Sampdoria and Cesena. However, during a 2–0 loss against Cesena, he suffered a hamstring injury that saw him substituted and was sidelined for two weeks. On 22 November 2014, Astori returned to the starting line–up, in a 2–1 win against Atalanta. Two months later on 6 January 2015, he scored his first goal for the club, scoring the only goal of the game, in a victory over Udinese. Throughout the 2014–15 season, Astori found himself in and out of the starting line–up for the side, as he continued to fight for his place over the centre–back position. Having helped Roma finish in second place to qualify for the UEFA Champions League next season, Astori made 30 total appearances during his time at the Stadio Olimpico, and scoring once in all competitions.

Following this, it was speculated on Astori's future on whether Roma would sign him on a permanent basis. But it was reported on 23 June 2015 that Roma has decided against signing Astori on a permanent basis.

=== Fiorentina ===
On 4 August 2015, Astori signed on loan for Fiorentina until the end of the season with an obligation to buy. Upon joining the club, he was given a number thirteen shirt ahead of the 2015–16 season.

He made his Fiorentina debut on 23 August in the 2–0 victory against AC Milan, coming on as a substitute for Facundo Roncaglia in the 59th minute. Since making his debut for the club, Astori quickly became a first team regular for the side, playing in the centre–back position. He also played all eight matches in the UEFA Europa League for Fiorentina and helped the side qualify for the knockout stage. However, they were eliminated in the knockout stage after losing 4–1 to Tottenham Hotspur in the UEFA Europa League Round of 32. Despite being out of the starting on five occasions during the 2015–16 season, he made forty–two appearances in all competitions. At the end of the 2015–16 season, it was announced that Fiorentina took an option to sign Astori on a permanent basis.

Astori's first game after signing for the club on a permanent basis came in the opening game of the season, starting the whole game, in a 2–1 loss against Juventus. This was followed up by keeping a clean sheet in the next three matches. However, he suffered a muscle injury that kept him out for two matches. On 2 October 2016, Astori returned to the starting line–up against Torino and started the match, as Fiorentina lost 2–1. Three weeks later on 26 October 2016, he scored his first goal for the club, in a 1–1 draw against Crotone. Following his return, Astori continued to regain his first team place, playing in the centre–back position for the next three months. This lasted until he missed one match for picking up five yellow cards and served a suspension against Pescara on 1 February 2017. After serving a one match suspension, Astori returned to the starting line–up, in a 4–0 loss against Roma on 7 February 2017. He then helped the club keep four consecutive clean sheets between 3 March 2017 and 2 April 2017. Astori then played an important role in the UEFA Europa League, setting up two goals for Fiorentina that saw the club progress to the knockout stage. However, they were eliminated in the knockout stage after losing 4–3 to Borussia Mönchengladbach in the UEFA Europa League Round of 32. He then scored his second goal of the season, in a 5–4 win against Inter Milan on 22 April 2017. Despite being suspended on two occasions later in the 2016–17 season, including a second bookable offence against Palermo on 30 April 2017, Astori went on to make forty appearances and scoring two times in all competitions.

At the beginning of 2017–18 season, Astori was appointed as the team captain following the departure of Gonzalo Rodríguez. He captained his first match at Fiorentina, starting the whole game, in a 3–0 loss against Inter Milan in the opening game of the season. Three weeks later on 10 September 2017, Astori scored his first goal of the season, in a 5–0 win against Hellas Verona. Since the start of the 2017–18 season, he continued to regain his first team place, playing in the centre–back position. Astori then helped the club's defence keep four league consecutive clean sheets between 3 December 2017 and 22 December 2017. Since the start of the 2017–18 season, he started in every match until he missed one match for picking up five yellow cards and served a suspension against Sampdoria on 21 January 2018. After serving a one match suspension, Astori returned to the starting line–up, in a 4–1 loss against Hellas Verona on 28 January 2018. On 25 February 2018, Astori made his final appearance for the club, playing the full match in a 1–0 home win over Chievo; six minutes into the match, Astori made a run forward, joining the attack, and passed the ball to Cristiano Biraghi, who scored the only goal with a long-range shot.

== International career ==
Astori played 4 games for Italy's under-18 team, beginning in 2004. He did not receive any further call-up at higher levels of youth international football.

Astori received his first call-up for the senior team under newly appointed coach Cesare Prandelli who named him in the squad for a friendly against Ivory Coast, to be played on 10 August 2010; however, he was left on the bench as an unused substitute. He made his full debut for Italy on 29 March 2011, in a 2–0 friendly win against Ukraine in Kyiv. He came on as a 17th-minute substitute for the injured Giorgio Chiellini but was sent off with 15 minutes remaining in the second half after receiving two yellow cards. A year later, Astori was named in the provisional 32-man squad ahead of the UEFA Euro 2012. However, he was subsequently cut from the squad on 28 May 2012. But following Andrea Barzagli's injury, there were speculation on whether Astori would be Barzagli's replacement. Eventually, Barzagli was kept in the squad and Astori stayed with Italy's training camp until 9 June 2012. Two months later, Astori was called up to the Italy and started the whole game, in a 2–1 loss against England on 15 August 2012.

Astori was a member of the 23-man Italy squad that took part at the 2013 FIFA Confederations Cup under Prandelli; Italy reached the semi-finals, only to suffer a penalty shoot-out defeat to Spain following a 0–0 draw after extra time, on 27 June 2013. On 30 June 2013, Astori scored the opener against Uruguay in the third-place match after knocking in the rebound from Alessandro Diamanti's free kick, as Italy won 3–2 on penalties to win the bronze-medal, following a 2–2 draw after extra time; this was his only international goal, and he became the first Cagliari player to score for Italy since Luigi Riva had done so 40 years earlier, in a 2–0 victory over Switzerland on 20 October 1973. A year later in September 2014, Astori was called up to the national team and earned his eighth international cap, in a 1–1 draw against Netherlands. Three years later on 5 September 2017, he played his last international match for Italy, starting the whole game and helped the national side keep a clean sheet, in a 1–0 victory over Israel. In total, Astori made 14 senior appearances for Italy between 2011 and 2017.

== Style of play ==
Astori was a tall and physically strong left-footed central defender, with good aerial ability and heading accuracy, which made him a goal threat on offensive set pieces; although he was not the quickest defender, he also possessed good leadership qualities, positional sense, organisational skills, distribution, and technique, which enabled him to play the ball out or start attacking plays from the back. As a defender, he was comfortable playing as left-sided centre-back in both a three-man or a four-man defensive line.

== Personal life ==
Astori spoke about his fondness of Bergamo, saying: "Let's say it's always nice, I leave my childhood, my family. It is a place that I will cherish in my life." He also spoke about his interests outside of football, saying: "More design because it is less difficult to understand (jokes, ed). Interior design, my brother is an architect. I started to bring some design magazines to training camp with me, my passion started."

Astori and his partner Francesca Fioretti had a daughter, Vittoria, who was two years old at the time of his death. Their daughter was born in Florence.

== Death and legacy ==
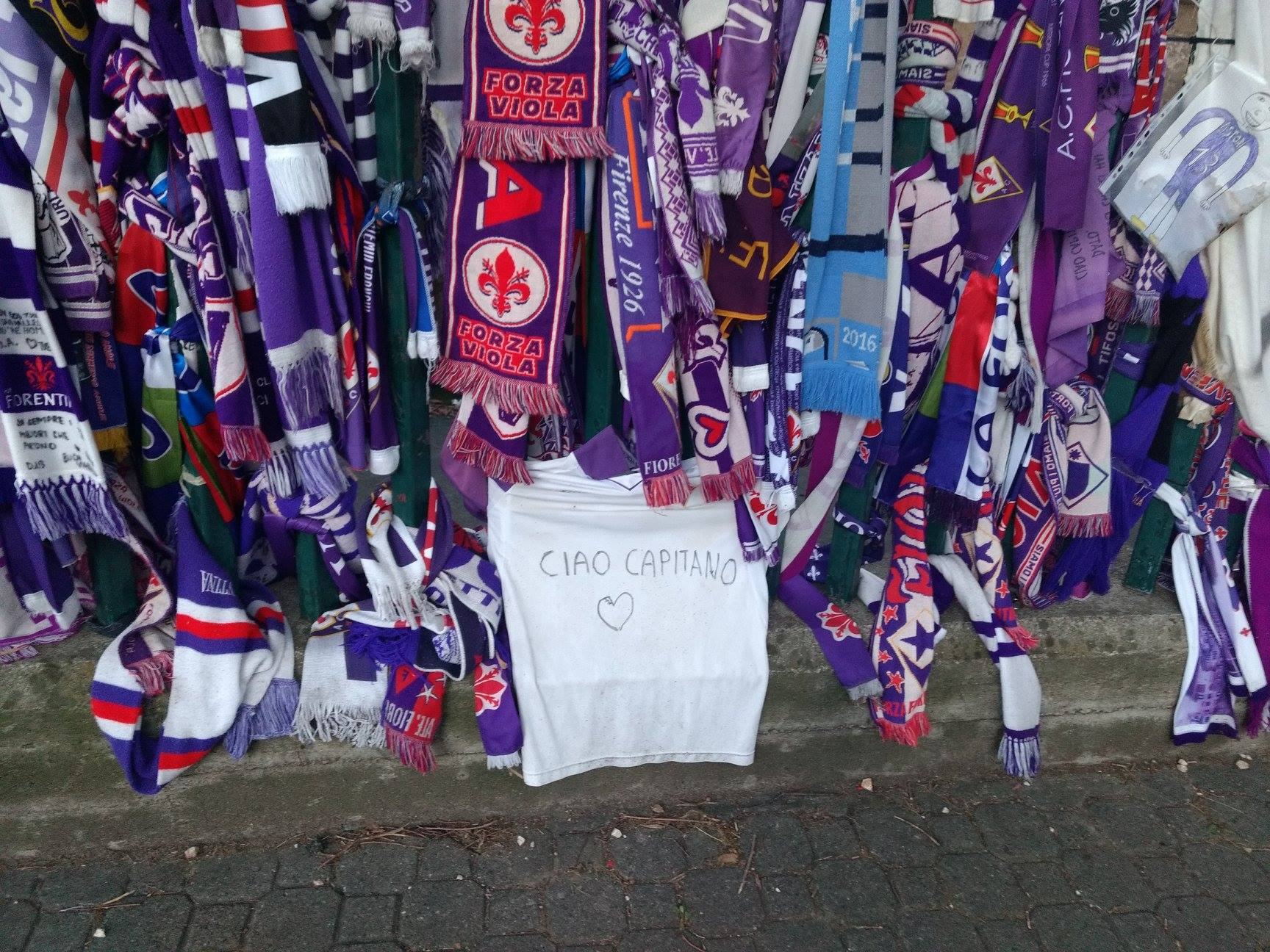
A memorial wall dedicated to Davide Astori, Stadio Artemio Franchi, Florence. "Ciao Capitano" became a farewell to Astori.

On 4 March 2018, Astori died in his sleep while staying in a hotel in Udine prior to Fiorentina's match against Udinese, proven to be caused by cardiac arrest determined from an autopsy conducted two days later. A club statement said "Fiorentina are profoundly shaken and forced to announce that their captain Davide Astori has died." His former Cagliari teammate and coach Diego López and former Fiorentina teammate Carlos Sánchez collapsed to the ground after hearing the news of his death. All Serie A and Serie B matches scheduled for 4 March were postponed. His death had caused shock across the footballing world, and many coaches and players paid their respects. UEFA later announced on Twitter that a minute's silence was to be observed before every European match scheduled for that week. Cagliari and Fiorentina both retired the number 13 jersey worn by Astori in his honour (Astori wore this number as it was the number that his idol, Alessandro Nesta, had also worn throughout his career). He was buried at San Pellegrino Terme cemetery on 8 March 2018. Fiorentina's next home game against Benevento, on 11 March, was paused for 60 seconds at the 13 minute mark in his honour, while children from both teams entered wearing Astori's jersey to pay tribute to him; Fiorentina won the match 1–0, with the only goal coming from Vitor Hugo, who celebrated after scoring by saluting a T-shirt bearing Astori's image.

Later that month, Fiorentina announced that they would rename their training ground "Centro Sportivo Davide Astori" after Astori. Also later that month, in Italy's friendly with Argentina on 23 March, as well as Italy's friendly against England on 27 March, the Italy squad shirts were embossed with, under the crest, "Davide sempre con noi", Italian for "Davide always with us", with the number 13 below. Although Serie A introduced a new ruling ahead of the 2018–19 Serie A season, which introduced a standardised armband for all club captains, Fiorentina's new captain, Germán Pezzella, was granted an exemption by the league, and was allowed to wear a personalised captain's armband in tribute to Astori. Later that year, Astori was inducted into the Fiorentina Hall of Fame.

To commemorate one year since his death, all Serie A matches were stopped at the 13th minute mark on 2 and 3 March 2019.

In April 2019 it was reported that Astori's contract would be renewed for life with all the money going to his wife and child, but it was later revealed to be a hoax.

In May 2019, during the 2018 ceremony for new members being inducted into the Italian Football Hall of Fame, a Fair Play Award in memory of Astori was also awarded for the first time ever; the recipient of the award was Igor Trocchia.

On 2 April 2021, Giorgio Galanti, a former Fiorentina sports consultant, was put on trial for culpable homicide in Astori's death. Galanti had signed off on two different certificates of fitness for Astori to practice football in July 2016 and in July 2017 despite stress tests showing cardiac arrhythmias that should have induced doctors to carry out more in-depth diagnostic tests. On 3 May 2021, Galanti was given a one-year suspended jail sentence, and ordered to pay provisional compensation for damages in the total amount of €1,090,000, of which €250,000 is paid to Astori's partner Francesca Fioretti, €240,000 to his daughter Vittoria, and the remaining €600,000 to his parents Renato and Giovanna, and his brothers Marco and Bruno.

During a reception hosted by the President of Italy Sergio Mattarella at the Quirinal Palace following Italy's victory in the UEFA Euro 2020, team captain Giorgio Chiellini in his speech on behalf of his teammates dedicated their victory to Davide Astori, whom the team "would have liked to have here with us today".

== Career statistics ==
=== Club ===
Appearances and goals by club, season and competition
Club	Season	League			Coppa Italia		Europe		Other		Total	
Club	Season	Division	Apps	Goals	Apps	Goals	Apps	Goals	Apps	Goals	Apps	Goals
AC Milan	2006–07	Serie A	0	0	0	0	0	0	0	0	0	0
Pizzighettone (loan)	2006–07	Serie C	25	1	0	0	—		2 (Note: Appearances in Serie C1 relegation play-offs)	0	27	1
Cremonese (loan)	2007–08	Serie C1	31	0	0	0	—		2	0	33	0
Cagliari	2008–09	Serie A	10	0	1	0	—		—		11	0
Cagliari	2009–10	Serie A	34	2	1	0	—		—		35	2
Cagliari	2010–11	Serie A	36	0	0	0	—		—		36	0
Cagliari	2011–12	Serie A	28	1	1	0	—		—		29	1
Cagliari	2012–13	Serie A	32	0	1	0	—		—		33	0
Cagliari	2013–14	Serie A	34	0	1	0	—		—		35	0
Cagliari	Total		174	3	5	0	—		—		179	3
Roma (loan)	2014–15	Serie A	24	1	2	0	4 (Note: Two appearances in UEFA Champions League, two appearances in UEFA Europa League)	0	—		30	1
Fiorentina (loan)	2015–16	Serie A	33	0	1	0	8 (Note: Appearances in UEFA Europa League)	0	—		42	0
Fiorentina	2016–17	Serie A	33	2	1	0	6	0	—		40	2
Fiorentina	2017–18	Serie A	25	1	2	0	—		—		27	1
Fiorentina	Total		58	3	3	0	6	0	—		67	3
Career total			345	8	11	0	18	0	4	0	378	8

=== International ===
Appearances and goals by national team and year
National team	Year	Apps	Goals
Italy	2011	1	0
Italy	2012	1	0
Italy	2013	5	1
Italy	2014	2	0
Italy	2015	1	0
Italy	2016	3	0
Italy	2017	1	0
Total		14	1

Score and result list Italy's goal tally first, score column indicates score after each Astori goal.

International goal scored by Davide Astori
No.	Date	Venue	Opponent	Score	Result	Competition
1	30 June 2013	Arena Fonte Nova, Salvador, Brazil	Uruguay	1–0	2–2 (3–2 p)	2013 FIFA Confederations Cup

== Honours ==
Italy

- FIFA Confederations Cup: 2013 (bronze medal)

Individual

- Fiorentina Hall of Fame: 2018
