= Albin Ekdal =

Swedish footballer (born 1989)

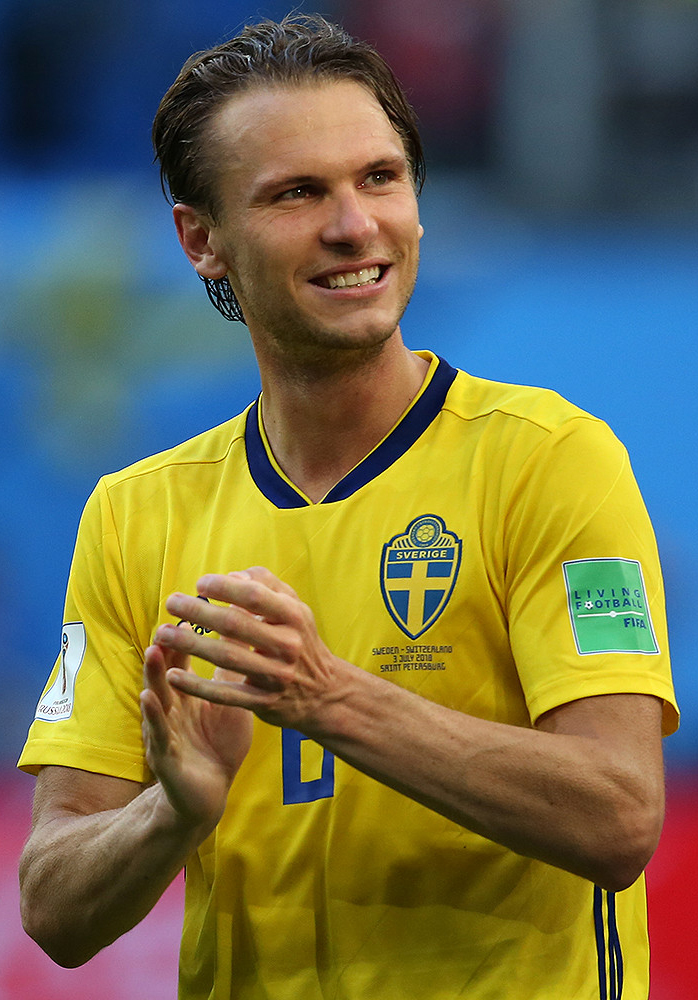
- Ekdal with Sweden at the 2018 FIFA World Cup

Personal information
- Full name: Albin Ekdal
- Date of birth: 28 July 1989 (age 37)
- Place of birth: Stockholm, Sweden
- Height: 1.86 m (6 ft 1 in)
- Position: Defensive midfielder

Youth career
- 1996–2006: IF Brommapojkarna

Senior career*
Years	Team	Apps	(Gls)
2007–2008	IF Brommapojkarna	24	(0)
2008–2010	Juventus	3	(0)
2009–2010	→ Siena (loan)	26	(1)
2010–2011	Bologna	22	(1)
2011–2015	Cagliari	116	(8)
2015–2018	Hamburger SV	54	(1)
2018–2022	Sampdoria	122	(3)
2022–2023	Spezia	40	(0)
2024–2025	Djurgårdens IF	33	(0)
Total		440	(14)

International career
2004–2006	Sweden U17	18	(5)
2007–2008	Sweden U19	8	(2)
2008–2010	Sweden U21	12	(2)
2011–2023	Sweden	70	(0)
- * Club domestic league appearances and goals

Albin Ekdal (Swedish: [ˈǎlːbɪn ˈêːkdɑːl]; born 28 July 1989) is a Swedish former professional footballer who played as a defensive midfielder.

Formed at Brommapojkarna, Ekdal spent most of his career in Italy, where he made over 300 Serie A appearances. He has represented Juventus, Siena, Bologna, Cagliari, Sampdoria, and Spezia in the competition between 2008 and 2023. He also spent three years in Germany's Bundesliga with Hamburger SV. In 2025, he retired from professional football, with his final club being Djurgårdens IF in Sweden.

A full international between 2011 and 2023, Ekdal won 70 caps for the Sweden national team. He represented his country at UEFA Euro 2016, the 2018 FIFA World Cup, and UEFA Euro 2020.

== Club career ==
=== Brommapojkarna ===
Albin Ekdal started his professional playing career with Brommapojkarna at the beginning of the 2007 Allsvenskan season. He played mainly as a central midfielder but also as an attacking midfielder or right midfielder.

=== Juventus ===
On 23 May 2008, Ekdal signed a four-year contract with Juventus of Italy's Serie A. He made his Serie A and club debut on 18 October in a 2–1 away defeat to Napoli, coming on as a substitute in the 75th minute for Christian Poulsen.

==== Loan to Siena ====
On 15 July 2009, fellow Italian top-flight club Siena signed Ekdal on loan for a season. He made 27 appearances for the Tuscans, who were ultimately relegated at the end of the season, and scored once, in a 4–3 loss away to eventual treble winners Inter Milan on 9 January 2010.

=== Bologna ===
On 28 June 2010, Juventus sold 50% of their ownership rights of Ekdal to Bologna. As per the deal, the two clubs would agree at the start of each season who would have him as a player. He played 23 total games for the Rossoblu and scored on the anniversary of his last goal, to open a 2–0 win at Bari.

=== Cagliari ===
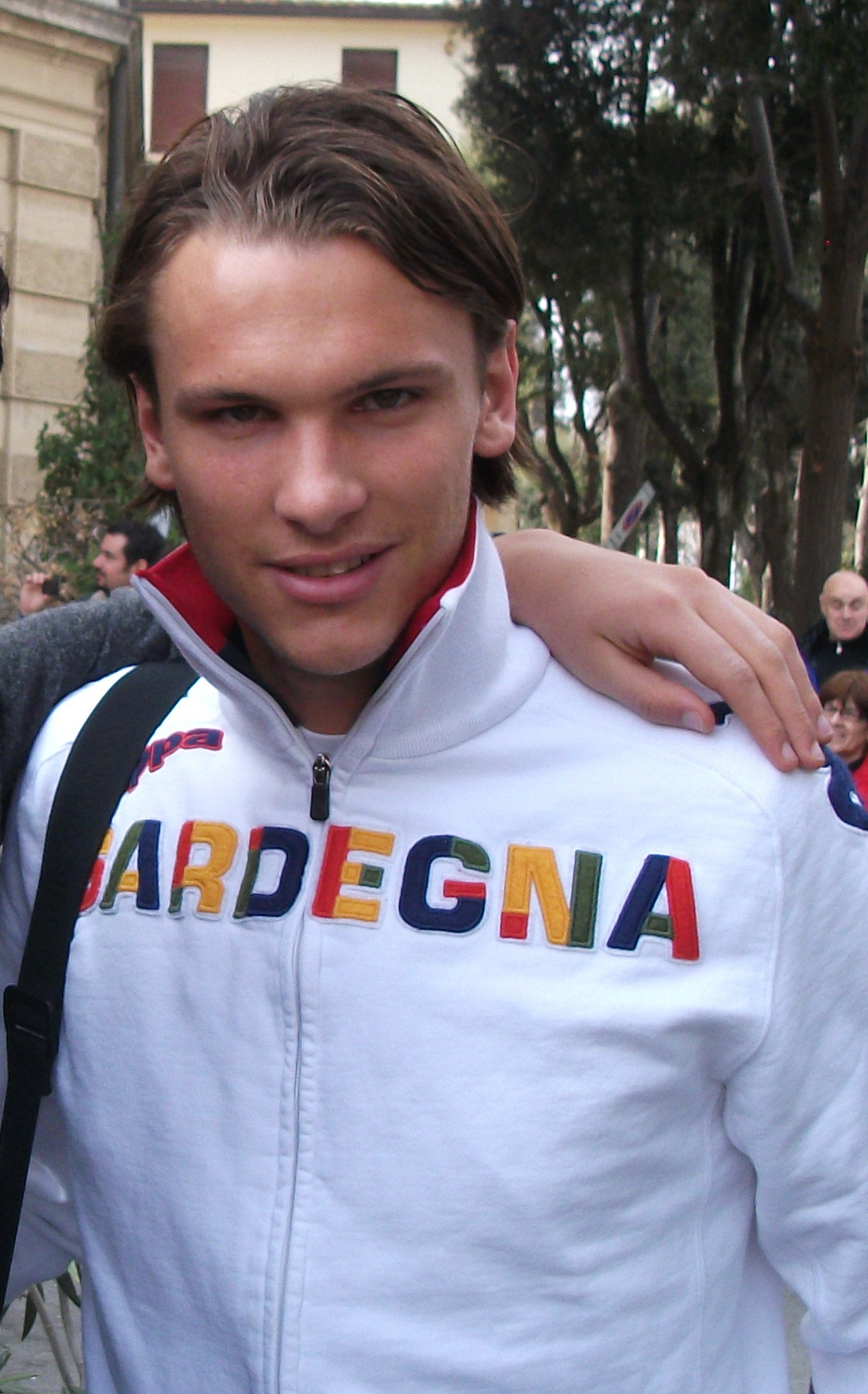
Ekdal with Cagliari in 2012

On 23 August 2011, Ekdal was sold to fellow Serie A team Cagliari on a three-year deal for €3 million.

On 28 September 2014, Ekdal scored a hat-trick as Cagliari won 4–1 at Inter Milan.

=== Hamburger SV ===
On 18 July 2015, German club Hamburger SV signed Ekdal from Cagliari on a four-year deal for €4.5 million with wages of €600,000 per season. He was given the number 20 shirt.

He played 57 games for the side in total, who struggled against relegation in each of his three years with the team, ending with their ultimate descent into the 2. Bundesliga in 2018. He scored once for the team from Hamburg, the only goal of a home win against Hertha BSC on 5 March 2017.

On 21 January 2017, Ekdal received the first red card of his career, after 33 minutes of a 1–0 loss at VfL Wolfsburg.

=== Sampdoria ===
On 14 August 2018, following Hamburg's relegation from the Bundesliga, Ekdal returned to Serie A by signing for Sampdoria.

=== Spezia ===
On 13 July 2022, Ekdal signed a two-year contract with Spezia.

=== Djurgården ===
On 30 December 2023, Ekdal moved back to Sweden and Stockholm after 16 years abroad, he signed for Djurgårdens IF, the club he supported as a child.

=== Retirement ===
On 28 November 2025, Ekdal announced his retirement from professional football.

== International career ==
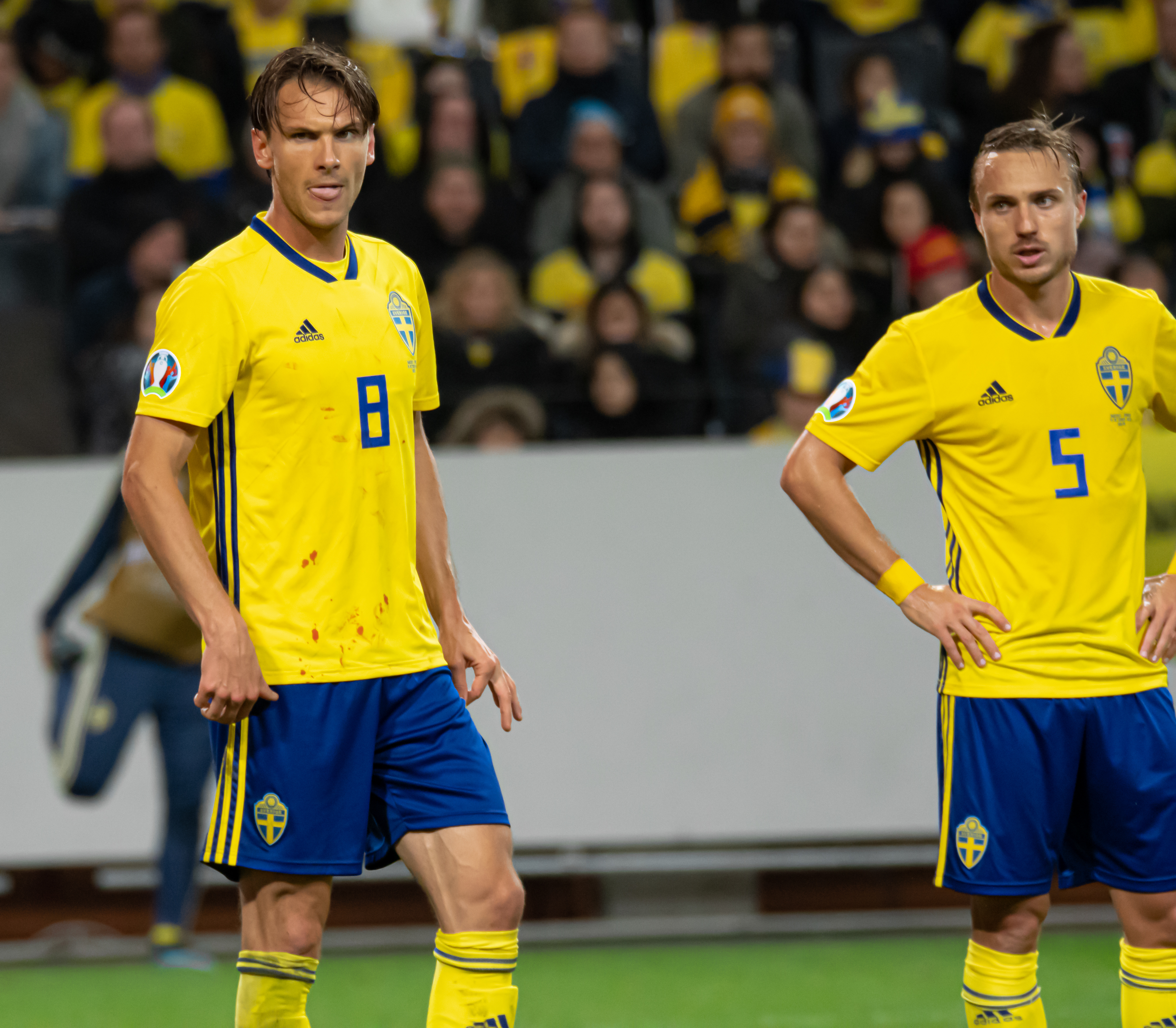
Ekdal (left) and Pierre Bengtsson (right) playing for Sweden against Spain in October 2019

Ekdal made his debut for Sweden on 10 August 2011 in a friendly game away to Ukraine in Kharkiv. He came on as a 60th-minute substitute for Sebastian Larsson in a 1–0 win.

Ekdal was named in Sweden's 23-man squad for UEFA Euro 2016 in France, despite a deep cut in his back from celebrating Hamburg's recent Bundesliga survival putting his involvement at risk. He played each match as the Swedes came bottom of their group.

In June 2018 Ekdal was named in Sweden's 23-man squad for the 2018 FIFA World Cup in Russia. He played all five games of a run to the quarter-finals.

Ekdal was included in Sweden's 26-man squad for UEFA Euro 2020.

After Sweden failed to qualify for UEFA Euro 2024, Ekdal announced his retirement from international football. On 20 November 2023, he made his final appearance in Sweden's qualifier against Estonia in Stockholm, captaining the team and playing 72 minutes before being substituted to a standing ovation from the Friends Arena crowd.

== Personal life ==
Ekdal grew up in Höglandet, an affluent suburb in Västerort, Stockholm. He is the son of Lennart Ekdal, an award-winning Swedish journalist, television personality and newscaster known for his work for the newspaper Dagens Nyheter and the financial magazine Veckans Affärer, as well as hosting TV shows such as Kalla fakta, Halvtid för Reinfeldt (with Fredrik Reinfeldt), Kvällsöppet med Ekdal & Hakelius and Hetluft.

Ekdal's younger brother, Hjalmar Ekdal, is a professional footballer who plays for Premier League club Burnley and the Sweden national team.

== Career statistics ==
=== Club ===
As of match played 4 June 2023

Club	Season	League			Cup		Europe		Other		Total	
Club	Season	Division	Apps	Goals	Apps	Goals	Apps	Goals	Apps	Goals	Apps	Goals
Brommapojkarna	2007	Allsvenskan	15	0	–		–		–		15	0
Brommapojkarna	2008	Superettan	9	0	–		–		–		9	0
Brommapojkarna	Total		24	0	0	0	0	0	0	0	24	0
Juventus	2008–09	Serie A	3	0	0	0	0	0	–		3	0
Juventus	2009–10	Serie A	0	0	0	0	0	0	–		0	0
Juventus	2010–11	Serie A	0	0	0	0	1	0	–		1	0
Juventus	Total		3	0	0	0	1	0	0	0	4	0
Siena (loan)	2009–10	Serie A	26	1	1	0	–		–		27	1
Bologna	2010–11	Serie A	22	1	1	0	–		–		23	1
Cagliari	2011–12	Serie A	30	1	1	0	–		–		31	1
Cagliari	2012–13	Serie A	31	1	3	0	–		–		34	1
Cagliari	2013–14	Serie A	22	1	1	0	–		–		23	1
Cagliari	2014–15	Serie A	33	5	1	0	–		–		34	5
Cagliari	Total		116	8	6	0	0	0	0	0	122	9
Hamburger SV	2015–16	Bundesliga	14	0	1	0	–		–		15	0
Hamburger SV	2016–17	Bundesliga	21	1	2	0	–		–		23	1
Hamburger SV	2017–18	Bundesliga	19	0	0	0	–		–		19	0
Hamburger SV	Total		54	1	3	0	0	0	0	0	57	1
Sampdoria	2018–19	Serie A	32	0	1	0	–		–		33	0
Sampdoria	2019–20	Serie A	32	0	1	0	–		–		33	0
Sampdoria	2020–21	Serie A	32	2	1	0	–		–		33	2
Sampdoria	2021–22	Serie A	26	1	1	0	–		–		27	1
Sampdoria	Total		122	3	4	0	0	0	0	0	126	3
Spezia	2022–23	Serie A	31	0	2	1	–		0	0	33	1
Career total			376	14	17	1	1	0	0	0	394	15

=== International ===
Appearances and goals by national team and year
National team	Year	Apps	Goals
Sweden	2011	1	0
Sweden	2012	1	0
Sweden	2013	5	0
Sweden	2014	6	0
Sweden	2015	7	0
Sweden	2016	8	0
Sweden	2017	4	0
Sweden	2018	10	0
Sweden	2019	8	0
Sweden	2020	5	0
Sweden	2021	10	0
Sweden	2022	1	0
Sweden	2023	4	0
Total		70	0

== Honours ==
Individual

- Swedish Midfielder of the Year: 2013, 2014, 2015
- Stor Grabb: 2016
