= Michael Agazzi =

Italian footballer (born 1984)

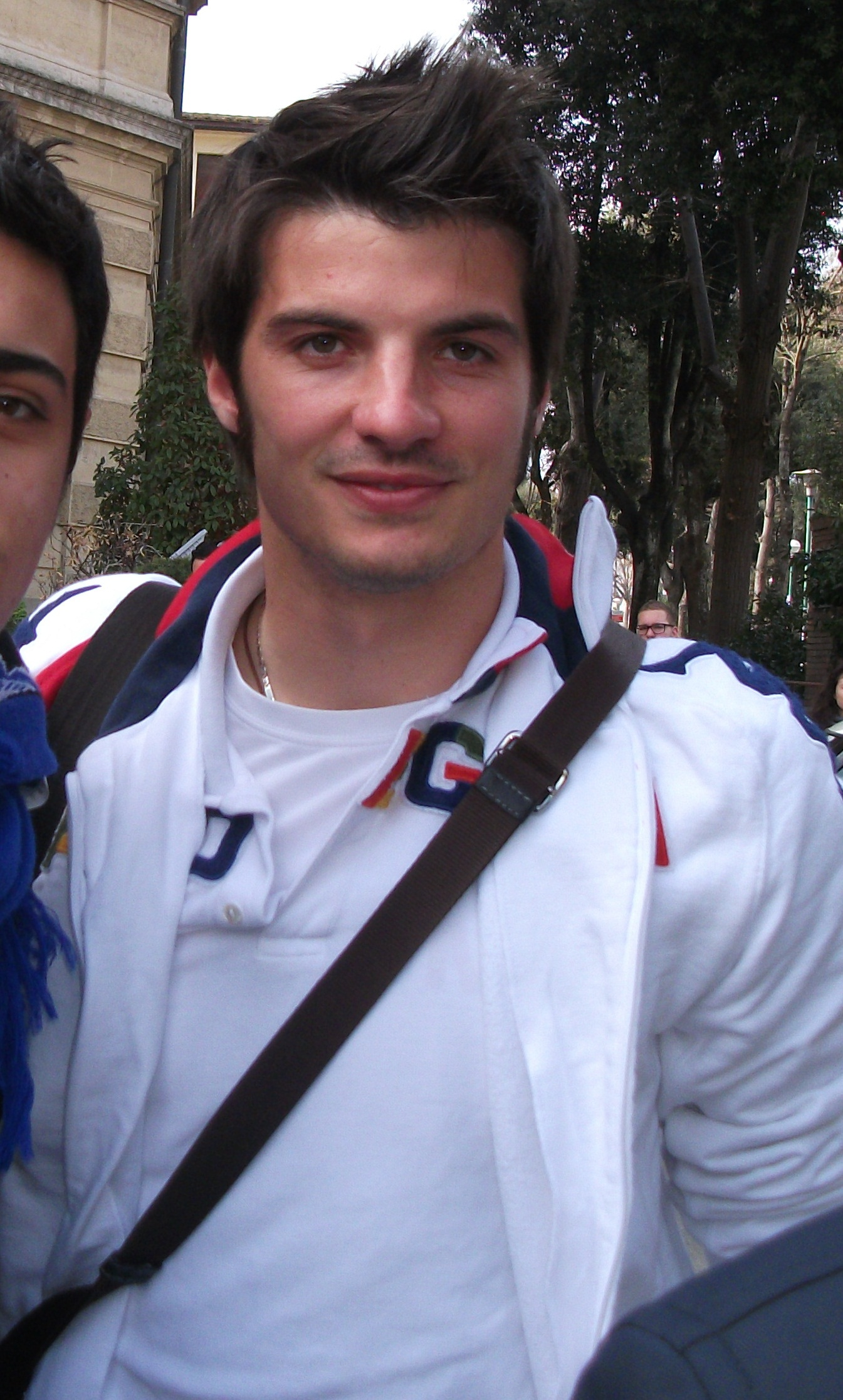
- Agazzi in 2012

Personal information
- Date of birth: 3 July 1984 (age 42)
- Place of birth: Ponte San Pietro, Italy
- Height: 1.91 m (6 ft 3 in)
- Position: Goalkeeper

Team information
- Current team: Real Calepina (youth coach)

Youth career
- 2002–2003: Atalanta

Senior career*
Years	Team	Apps	(Gls)
2003–2005	Atalanta	0	(0)
2003–2004	→ Südtirol (loan)	2	(0)
2005–2009	Triestina	70	(0)
2006–2007	→ Sassuolo (loan)	20	(0)
2007–2008	→ Foggia (loan)	24	(0)
2009–2014	Cagliari	122	(0)
2014	Chievo	14	(0)
2014–2016	AC Milan	0	(0)
2015–2016	→ Middlesbrough (loan)	0	(0)
2016–2017	Cesena	21	(0)
2017–2018	Alessandria	15	(0)
2018	Ascoli	16	(0)
2018–2020	Cremonese	25	(0)
Total		352	(0)

International career
2005	Italy U-21 Serie B	1	(0)

Managerial career
- 2022–: Real Calepina (youth coach)
- * Club domestic league appearances and goals

Michael Agazzi (Italian pronunciation: [ˈmaikol aˈɡattsi]; born 3 July 1984) is an Italian former professional footballer who played as a goalkeeper. He is currently working as a youth coach at Real Calepina.

== Club career ==
=== Early career ===
Agazzi was a youth product of Atalanta. He started his professional career in Südtirol.

=== Triestina ===
In 2004 Triestina signed Agazzi from Atalanta on loan. In June 2005, Triestina signed Agazzi on a co-ownership deal, for €40,000 fee. In June 2006 Triestina signed Agazzi outright for an additional €250,000 fee.

Since 2008–09 season, Agazzi has been the first choice goalkeeper, after the departure of Generoso Rossi.

=== Cagliari ===
On 9 July 2009 Cagliari signed the goalkeeper from Serie B club Triestina in a joint ownership deal, for €575,000 on a 4-year deal. He would continue to play for Triestina until June 2010.

However, on 1 February 2010 he returned to Cagliari, 5 months earlier, on a temporary deal for €1.2 million loan fee. Triestina also acquired Agazzi outright for €500. Co-currently, Triestina signed Alex Calderoni as a replacement. On 21 June 2010, Cagliari signed the keeper outright from the relegated side for €50,000 fee. (later Triestina was re-admitted to Serie B)

He became the first choice goalkeeper for Cagliari in 2010–11 season after the original one, Federico Marchetti, was frozen by the club as punishment. Ivan Pelizzoli, former internationals, also hinted he is the backup of Agazzi instead of Marchetti at the start of season. In July 2011 he signed a new 3-year contract with the Serie A club.

=== Chievo ===
Cagliari and Agazzi could not agree on a new contract. In January 2014 Agazzi was transferred to Chievo, with Marco Silvestri moved to Cagliari on a temporary deal.

=== AC Milan ===
On 22 May 2014, AC Milan announced the summer signing of Agazzi from Chievo, with the transfer taking effect from 1 July. News of Agazzi's arrival came just a day after the renewal of Christian Abbiati's contract at the Milanese-based club. Agazzi would replace Marco Amelia who was not offered a contract extension by Milan.

=== Middlesbrough ===
On 29 August 2015, Middlesbrough announced the signing on loan of Agazzi from Milan.

=== Cesena ===
On 18 July 2016, Agazzi left Milan and joined Cesena on a permanent deal.

=== Alessandria & Ascoli ===
On 18 July 2017 Agazzi signed a one-year contract with Alessandria. He was assigned number 22 shirt. On 30 January 2018, he was exchanged with Riccardo Ragni of Ascoli. Agazzi also wore number 22 shirt for his new club.

=== Cremonese ===
On 16 November 2018, he signed with Cremonese.

== International career ==
Agazzi played for Italy U21 B team against Bosnia and Herzegovina U21 team in 2005. He was a substitute of fellow goalkeeper Mario Cassano.

== Coaching ==
In July 2022 it was confirmed, that Agazzi had been hired as a youth coach at Serie D side Real Calepina.

== Career statistics ==
=== Club ===
Appearances and goals by club, season and competition
Club	Season	League			Coppa Italia		Europe		Other		Total	
Club	Season	Division	Apps	Goals	Apps	Goals	Apps	Goals	Apps	Goals	Apps	Goals
Triestina	2004–05	Serie B	0	0	2	0	—		—		2	0
Triestina	2005–06	Serie B	5	0	0	0	—		—		5	0
Triestina	2008–09	Serie B	42	0	2	0	—		—		44	0
Triestina	2009–10	Serie B	23	0	3	0	—		—		26	0
Triestina	Total		70	0	7	0	—		—		77	0
Sassuolo (loan)	2006–07	Serie C1	20	0	1	0	—		—		21	0
Foggia (loan)	2007–08	Serie C1	24	0	—		—		2	0	26	0
Cagliari	2009–10	Serie A	3	0	—		—		—		3	0
Cagliari	2010–11	Serie A	38	0	0	0	—		—		38	0
Cagliari	2011–12	Serie A	36	0	1	0	—		—		37	0
Cagliari	2012–13	Serie A	34	0	1	0	—		—		35	0
Cagliari	2013–14	Serie A	11	0	1	0	—		—		12	0
Cagliari	Total		122	0	3	0	—		—		125	0
Chievo	2013–14	Serie A	14	0	0	0	—		—		14	0
AC Milan	2014–15	Serie A	0	0	0	0	—		—		0	0
Middlesbrough (loan)	2015–16	Championship	0	0	0	0	—		0	0	0	0
Cesena	2016–17	Serie B	21	0	4	0	—		—		25	0
Alessandria	2017–18	Serie C	15	0	2	0	—		—		17	0
Ascoli	2017–18	Serie B	14	0	—		—		2	0	16	0
Cremonese	2018–19	Serie B	12	0	—		—		—		12	0
Cremonese	2019–20	Serie B	13	0	3	0	—		—		16	0
Cremonese	Total		25	0	3	0	—		—		28	0
Career total			350	0	20	0	0	0	4	0	560	0
