= Antonio Balzano =

Italian footballer (born 1986)

Personal information
- Date of birth: 13 June 1986 (age 40)
- Place of birth: Bitonto, Italy
- Height: 1.76 m (5 ft 9 in)
- Position: Right back

Senior career*
Years	Team	Apps	(Gls)
2004–2006	Bari	1	(0)
2006	→ Cisco Roma (loan)	0	(0)
2006–2007	Rieti	13	(0)
2008	→ Cisco Roma (loan)	4	(0)
2008–2011	Cisco/Atletico Roma	90	(2)
2011–2014	Pescara	98	(1)
2014–2017	Cagliari	50	(1)
2016–2017	→ Cesena (loan)	31	(0)
2017–2021	Pescara	66	(0)
2022	Seregno	10	(0)
- * Club domestic league appearances and goals as of 24 April 2022

Antonio Balzano (born 13 June 1986) is an Italian footballer who plays as a defender.

== Career ==
=== Early career ===
He grows with juvenile team of Bitonto. He joined at S.S.C. Bari when he was a boy.

=== Pescara ===
In July 2011, Balzano moved to Serie B side Pescara when his former club Atletico Roma dissolved. He made regular appearances for three years in Pescara and also served as a captain in his last term with the team.

=== Cagliari ===
Balzano joined Serie A side Cagliari in July 2014, where he was reunited with his former Pescara manager, Zdeněk Zeman.

On 30 July 2015, Balzano extended the contract until 2018.

In July 2016, he joined Serie B club Cesena on loan, with a conditional obligation to buy if the club won promotion to Serie A.

On 4 February 2022, Balzano signed with Seregno in Serie C.
