= Stadio Is Arenas =

Sports stadium in Sardinia, Italy

Coordinates: 39°13′51″N 9°10′55″E

Stadio Comunale Is Arenas
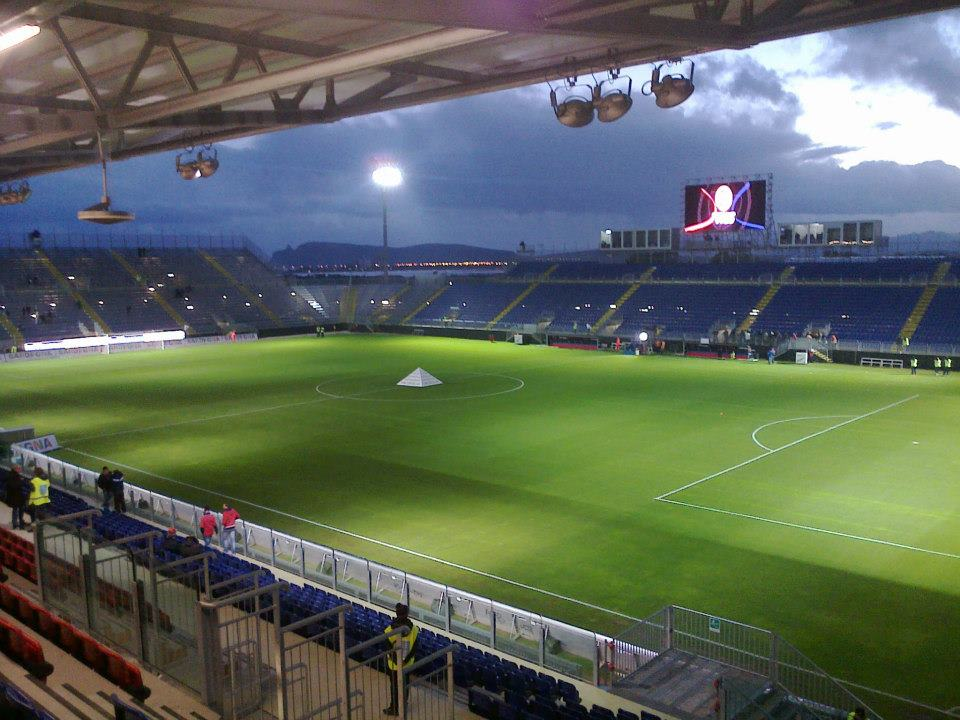
- Interactive map of Stadio Comunale Is Arenas
- Location: Quartu Sant'Elena, Italy
- Owner: Municipality of Quartu Sant'Elena
- Capacity: 16,500
- Field size: 105 × 68 m

Construction
- Renovated: 2012 - ?
- Closed: 2011

Tenant
- Cagliari Calcio

Stadio Comunale "Is Arenas" is a sports stadium in Quartu Sant'Elena, Sardinia, Italy. It is mostly used for football games and was the home venue of Serie A club Cagliari Calcio for the 2012–13 season.

The stadium is currently under renovation after Cagliari relocated out of their former home venue, Stadio Sant'Elia, in order to make it comply with Serie A league standards in time for the new season.

== History ==
=== Origin ===
Like most of Italian stadiums, it is owned by the local council, the municipality of Quartu Sant'Elena. In the 1980s, Quartu Sant'Elena's local team (Sant'Elena) played its home games in the ground in Serie C2

=== Renovation ===
In 2012, Cagliari Calcio relocated to the stadium due to the Sant'Elia's unavailability. The stadium was a simple pitch with a concrete stand. It was expanded and to a capacity of 16,200 seats.

Current renovation works were planned to cost €1.2 million and last for five months in 2012, but as of 2026 construction is still underway, and its cost has risen to over € 2 million.

== Structure ==
Three quarters of the stadium consists of temporary stands in steel tubes. The main stand is made of steel and prefabricated elements and is completely covered. There are five lighting towers for overall illumination of 1400 lux.{{cn}} The playing field consists of natural grass, with grafts of Cynodon dactylon and Paspalum vaginatum, ideal at the temperature of 25 °C.
