= Marco Ruzittu =

Italian footballer

Personal information
- Date of birth: 15 June 1991 (age 35)
- Place of birth: Santa Teresa Gallura, Italy
- Height: 1.80 m (5 ft 11 in)
- Position: Goalkeeper

Team information
- Current team: Arzachena
- Number: 1

Youth career
- –2010: Cagliari

Senior career*
Years	Team	Apps	(Gls)
2010–2013	Cagliari	0	(0)
2012–2013	→ Casale (loan)	20	(0)
2013–	Arzachena	115	(0)
- * Club domestic league appearances and goals as of 29 October 2017

Marco Ruzittu (born 15 June 1991) is an Italian football player. He plays for Arzachena.

== Club career ==
He made his Serie C debut for Arzachena on 27 August 2017 in a game against Arezzo.
