= Quartu Sant'Elena =

Quartu Sant'Elena Cuartu Sant'Aleni (Sardinian)
- Comune
- Comune di Quartu Sant'Elena
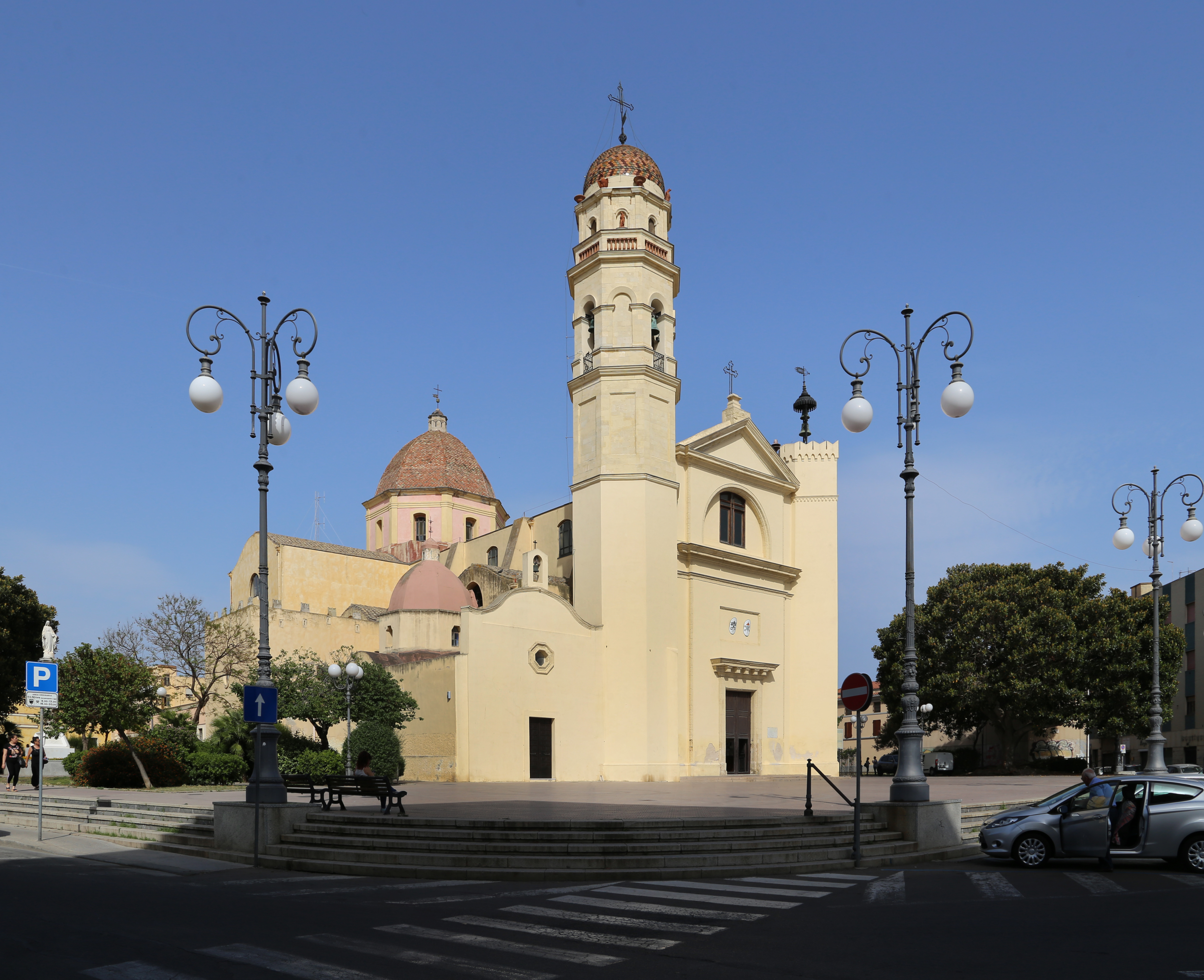
- Saint Helena Basilica

- Coat of arms

- Location within Sardinia
- Coordinates: 39°14′N 09°11′E
- Country: Italy
- Region: Sardinia
- Metropolitan city: Cagliari (CA)
- Frazioni: Flumini di Quartu

Government
  - Mayor: Graziano Milia

Area
  - Total: 96.28 km^{2} (37.17 sq mi)
- Elevation: 6 m (20 ft)

Population (2025)
  - Total: 68,108
  - Density: 707.4/km^{2} (1,832/sq mi)
- Demonym: Quartesi
- Time zone: UTC+1 (CET)
  - Summer (DST): UTC+2 (CEST)
- Postal code: 09045, 09046
- Dialing code: 070
- Patron saint: St. Helena
- Saint day: 14 September
- Website: Official website

Quartu Sant'Elena (Italian: [ˈkwartu sanˈtɛːlena]; Sardinian: Cuartu Sant'Aleni [ˈkwaɾtu zantaˈlɛni]), located four miles East from Cagliari on the ancient Roman road, is a city and comune in the Metropolitan City of Cagliari, Sardinia, Italy. It is the third largest city of Sardinia with a population of 68,108 as of 2025.

== History ==
The city's name comes from its distance to Cagliari (Quartum miles, Latin for “four miles”), and from the passage there of St. Helena, mother of emperor Constantine.

The first traces of human presence in Quartu are from the Prenuragic, Nuragic and Phoenician period, as attested by findings in Cepola, Geremeas, Is Mortorius and Separassiu localities. Roman findings were found near Sant’Andrea villa, a graveyard at S. Martino and a few tombs at Simbirizzi.

In the 11th century AD Sardinia was divided into four Giudicati: Quartu, which included fourteen villas, belonged to the Giudicato of Cagliari. In 1066 Quartu was given to Cagliari's archbishop and then went back to Judge Torchitorio II of Cagliari. During the Aragonese rule, Quartu suffered from famines, plague, malaria and continuous raids from Saracen pirates, following the general path of decay of the whole of Sardinia.

In 1793 the soldiers of a French fleet landed on the coast of Quartu, with the intention of conquering the whole island; the people of the city, led by Antonio Pisanu, assailed the French and repelled them after a bloody battle.

The feudalism started by the Aragonese, led since 1436 by Giovanni de Sena, viscount of Sanluri and baron of Quatru Saint'Elena, ended in 1836 under the baron Pes di Villamarina. In 1956 Quartu Sant’Elena was upgraded to the status of “city” by the President of Italy Giovanni Gronchi.

== Geography ==
Quartu has a long, shallow coastline. It also looks onto the pond of Molentargius, where flamingos and Sultan roosters nest.

=== Climate ===
Climate data for Quartu Sant'Elena
Month	Jan	Feb	Mar	Apr	May	Jun	Jul	Aug	Sep	Oct	Nov	Dec	Year
Mean daily maximum °C (°F)	14 (57)	15 (59)	17 (63)	19 (66)	24 (75)	28 (82)	31 (88)	32 (90)	28 (82)	24 (75)	19 (66)	15 (59)	22 (72)
Mean daily minimum °C (°F)	6 (43)	6 (43)	8 (46)	9 (48)	13 (55)	17 (63)	20 (68)	20 (68)	18 (64)	15 (59)	10 (50)	7 (45)	12 (54)
Source: weather.sg.msn.com

== Demographics ==
Historical population

Year	Pop.	±%
1861	6,491	—
1871	6,324	−2.6%
1881	6,636	+4.9%
1901	8,453	+27.4%
1911	9,247	+9.4%
1921	9,936	+7.5%
1931	10,913	+9.8%
1936	12,201	+11.8%

Year	Pop.	±%
1951	17,579	+44.1%
1961	22,916	+30.4%
1971	30,700	+34.0%
1981	43,896	+43.0%
1991	61,636	+40.4%
2001	68,040	+10.4%
2011	69,296	+1.8%
2021	68,853	−0.6%

Source: ISTAT

== Economy ==
The economy is based on the tertiary industry. Quartu also produces excellent wines, bread and cakes. Although the city is not extremely big, there are many shopping opportunities: Carrefour, E. Leclerc-Conad, Iper Pan.

== Main sights ==
There are five churches situated in the city. The most important are the churches of Sant'Elena Imperatrice (dating before 1589, but now in neoclassical style and recently proclaimed "Basilica"), Santa Maria Cepola (before 1089) and Sant'Agata.

There is also Sa dom’e farra, a large peasant house of the 17th century with various rooms, objects and tools used by the peasant society.

There are numerous nuraghi in the vicinity.

== Festivities ==
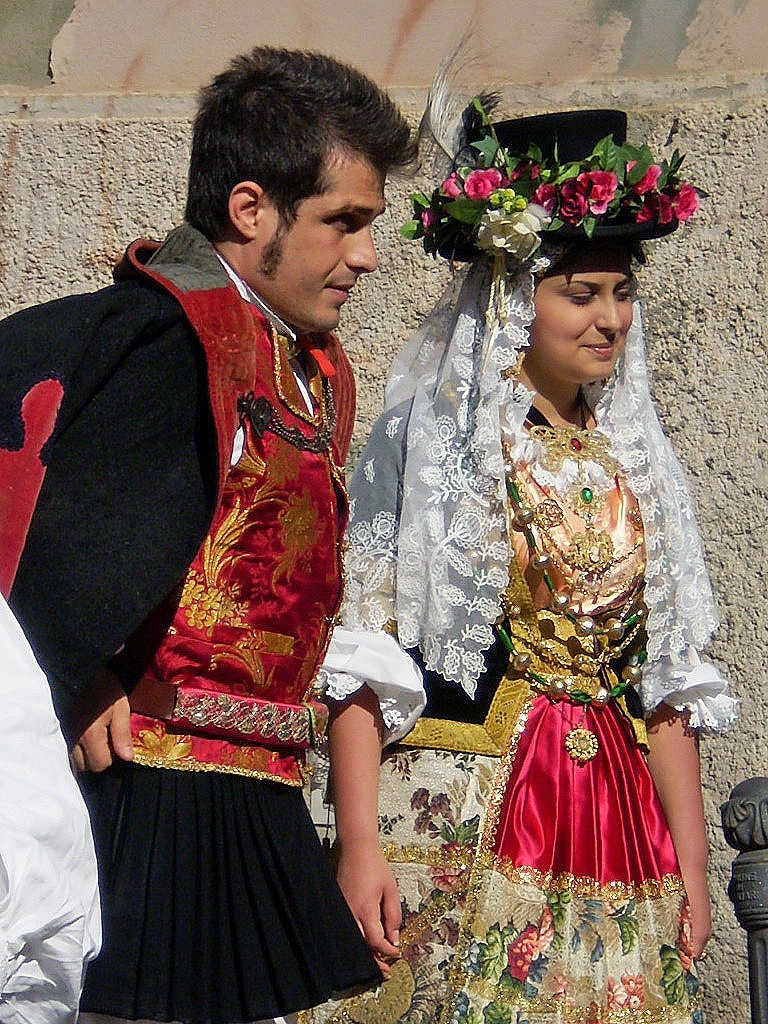
Traditional dresses

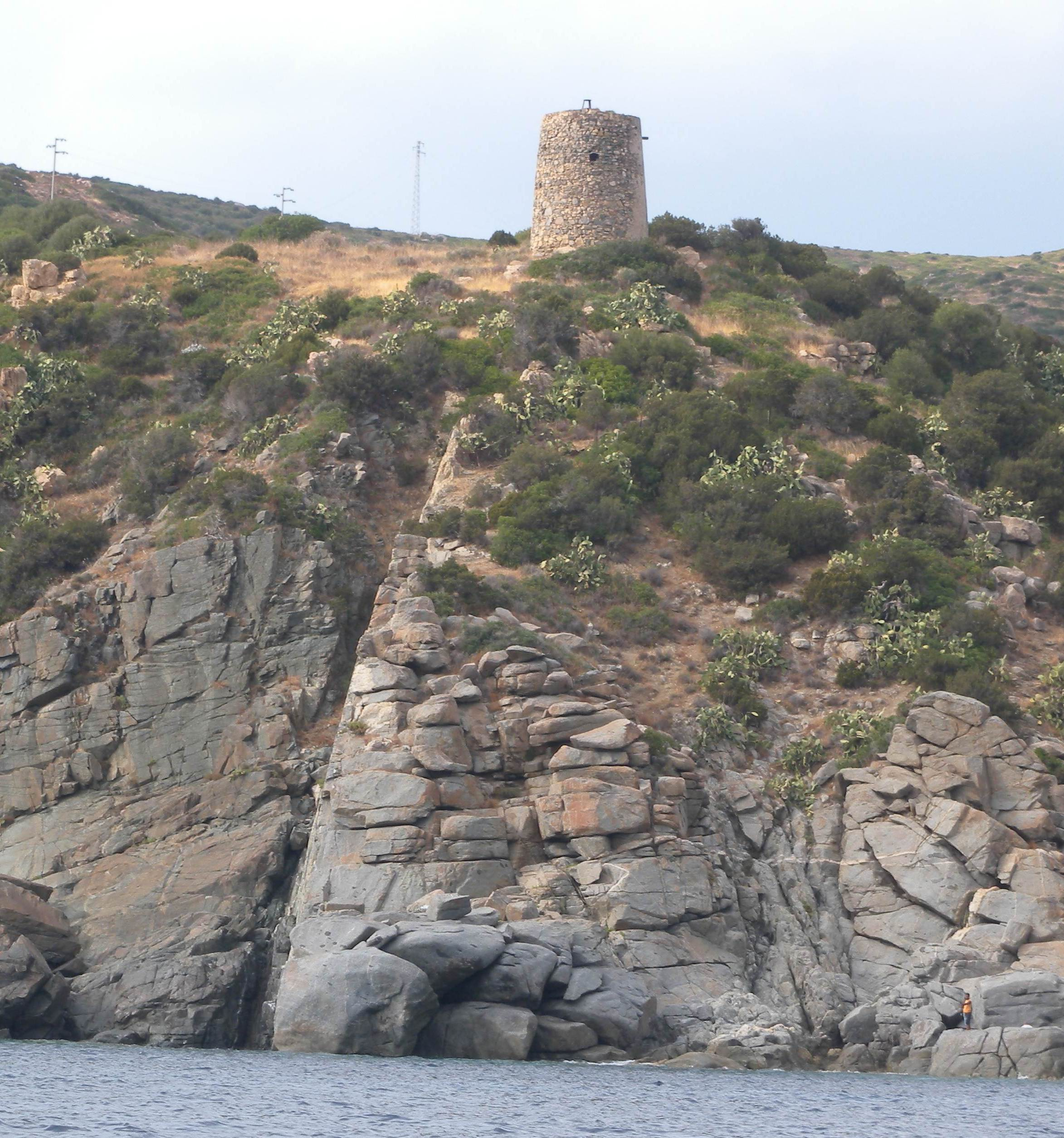
18th-century defence tower along the coast of Cala Regina

The most important religious festivity is dedicated to Saint Helena and is celebrated on 14 September.

== Sport ==
Quartu Sant'Elena has a 16,500-capacity football stadium, the Stadio Is Arenas. In the 2012–13 season, it hosted Serie A club Cagliari Calcio, whose Stadio Sant'Elia was closed that year. Quartu Sant'Elena has also a 500-capacity Marina, Marina di Capitana, with a sailing school, Scuola Italia in Vela.

== See also ==
- Cagliari metropolitan area
