= Mattia Gallon =

Italian footballer

Personal information
- Date of birth: 30 May 1992 (age 34)
- Place of birth: Arborea, Italy
- Height: 1.73 m (5 ft 8 in)
- Position: Forward

Team information
- Current team: Lucchese

Senior career*
Years	Team	Apps	(Gls)
2008–2013	Cagliari	1	(0)
2011–2012	→ Treviso (loan)	23	(3)
2012–2013	→ Savona (loan)	25	(2)
2013	Olbia	12	(3)
2013–2014	Nuorese		(1)
2014–2015	HinterReggio	18	(7)
2015	Marsala	17	(7)
2015–2016	Siracusa	9	(1)
2016–2017	Sicula Leonzio	26	(9)
2017–2018	Gela	21	(7)
2018	Castrovillari	11	(3)
2018–2019	Picerno	11	(2)
2019	Licata	10	(2)
2019–	Lucchese	2	(0)

International career
2009	Italy U-18	2	(0)
- * Club domestic league appearances and goals as of 18:40, 13 April 2020 (UTC)

Mattia Gallon (born 30 May 1992) is an Italian professional footballer who plays for Lucchese as a forward.

== Club career ==
He made his Serie A debut for Cagliari on 28 March 2010 in a game against Sampdoria.

On 17 August 2019, he joined Serie D club Licata. He left the club in December 2019, to join another Serie D club, Lucchese.
