= Marco Piredda =

Italian footballer

Personal information
- Date of birth: 4 May 1994 (age 32)
- Place of birth: Cagliari, Italy
- Height: 1.74 m (5 ft 9 in)
- Position: Midfielder

Team information
- Current team: Costa Orientale Sarda
- Number: 5

Youth career
- –2013: Cagliari

Senior career*
Years	Team	Apps	(Gls)
2013–2016	Cagliari	0	(0)
2013–2014	→ Como (loan)	2	(0)
2014–2015	→ Ternana (loan)	3	(0)
2015	→ Siena (loan)	9	(1)
2016–2019	Olbia	52	(5)
2019–2020	Sambenedettese	12	(0)
2020–2021	Carbonia	28	(5)
2021–2022	Torres	17	(0)
2022–	Costa Orientale Sarda	29	(0)
- * Club domestic league appearances and goals as of 8 October 2023

Marco Piredda (born 4 May 1994) is an Italian football player who plays for Serie D club Costa Orientale Sarda.

== Club career ==
He made his Serie C debut for Como on 22 September 2013 in a game against Südtirol.

On 19 February 2019, he was released from his contract with Olbia by mutual consent.

On 30 July 2019 he signed a one-year contract with Sambenedettese.
