= 2005–06 Cagliari Calcio season =

Cagliari Calcio
2005-06 season
- Manager: Attilio Tesser; Daniele Arrigoni; Davide Ballardini; Nedo Sonetti
- Serie A: 14th
- Coppa Italia: Last 16
- Top goalscorer: League: David Suazo (22); All: David Suazo (25)

Cagliari Calcio had a difficult season, where owner Massimo Cellino decided to fire three coaches during the course of the same season. Without retired Gianfranco Zola's influence of the offensive play, David Suazo took on a larger responsibility, answering with scoring 22 league goals, a career-high tally for the Honduran striker. That ensured Cagliari was kept eight points above Messina in the relegation zone. Following penalties for Juventus and Lazio in Calciopoli, the team was moved up from 16th to 14th place.

== Squad ==
=== Goalkeepers ===
- (Uruguay) (Italy) Fabián Carini
- (Italy) Andrea Campagnolo
- (Italy) Antonio Chimenti

=== Defenders ===
- (Uruguay) Joe Bizera
- (Italy) Michele Canini
- (Italy) Francesco Bega
- (Uruguay) Diego López
- (Italy) Michele Ferri
- (Italy) Alessandro Agostini

=== Midfielders ===
- (Italy) Daniele Conti
- (Italy) Alessandro Conticchio
- (Italy) Alessandro Budel
- (Uruguay) Nelson Abeijón
- (Italy) Claudio Pani
- (Italy) Andrea Cossu
- (Italy) Marco Marcuso
- (Italy) Salvatore Burrai

=== Attackers ===
- (Italy) Mauro Esposito
- (Honduras) David Suazo
- (Italy) Andrea Cacco
- (Italy) Andrea Capone
- (Italy) Antonio Langella
- (Italy) Roberto Puddu

== Serie A ==
Pos	Team	Pld	W	D	L	GF	GA	GD	Pts
12	Sampdoria	38	10	11	17	47	51	−4	41
13	Reggina	38	11	8	19	39	65	−26	41
14	Cagliari	38	8	15	15	42	55	−13	39
15	Siena	38	9	12	17	42	60	−18	39
16	Lazio (Note: Milan, Fiorentina and Lazio were docked 30 points, all for involvement in the Calciopoli.)	38	16	14	8	57	47	+10	32

Source: 2005–06 Serie A, Soccerway
Rules for classification: 1) points; 2) goal difference; 3) number of goals scored.

=== Matches ===
1	Siena	2–1	Cagliari
	Chiesa 45' (pen.), 56'		Esposito 9'

2	Cagliari	1–1	Lazio
	Suazo 1'		Siviglia 13'

3	Cagliari	1–1	Messina
	Suazo 41'		Donati 30'

4	Empoli	3–1	Cagliari
	Tavano 46, 63'; Almirón 68'		Capone 33'

5	Cagliari	0–0	Roma

6	Lecce	3–0	Cagliari
	Konan 8'; Pinardi 14' (pen.); Ledesma 69'

7	Cagliari	0–2	Milan
			Gilardino 1'; Shevchenko 27'

8	Chievo	2–1	Cagliari
	D'Anna 71'; Obinna 73'		Suazo 90 + 4'

9	Cagliari	1–1	Livorno
	Suazo 6' (pen.)		Melara 75'

10	Fiorentina	2–1	Cagliari
	Toni 53'; Jørgensen 82'		Suazo 23'

11	Cagliari	0–0	Treviso

12	Reggina	3–1	Cagliari
	Amoruso 2'; Cozza 38' (pen.); Paredes 81'		Abeijón 67'

13	Cagliari	2–0	Sampdoria
	Suazo 20, 52'

14	Palermo	2–2	Cagliari
	Caracciolo 20'; Makinwa 22'		Conti 64'; Bega 88'

15	Juventus	4–0	Cagliari
	Nedvěd 10'; Trezeguet 18', 53'; Vignati 68' (o.g.)

16	Cagliari	2–1	Ascoli
	Del Grosso 8' (o.g.); Suazo 26' (pen.)		Biso 55'

17	Parma	1–0	Cagliari
	Corradi 23'

18	Cagliari	2–1	Udinese
	Conti 38'; Langella 86'		Sensini 23'

19	Inter	3–2	Cagliari
	Martins 10'; Adriano 14', 58' (pen.)		Esposito 20'; Suazo 81'

20	Cagliari	1–0	Siena
	Suazo 90 + 4'

21	Lazio	1–1	Cagliari
	Di Canio 36'		Gobbi 69'

22	Messina	1–0	Cagliari
	Di Napoli 88'

23	Cagliari	4–1	Empoli
	Abeijón 2'; Esposito 19, 61'; Suazo 37'		Tavano 60'

24	Roma	4–3	Cagliari
	Perrotta 25'; De Rossi 34'; Totti 79' (pen.), 90 + 2' (pen.)		Suazo 15'; Langella 19'; Conti 58'

25	Cagliari	0–0	Lecce

26	Milan	1–0	Cagliari
	Gilardino 23' (pen.)

27	Cagliari	2–2	Chievo
	Suazo 32'; Gobbi 90 + 4'		Tiribocchi 85'; Pellissier 90'

28	Livorno	0–1	Cagliari
			Suazo 77'

29	Cagliari	0–0	Fiorentina

30	Treviso	1–2	Cagliari
	Baseggio 24'		Esposito 11'; Suazo 76' (pen.)

31	Cagliari	0–2	Reggina
			A. Lucarelli 8'; Tedesco 20'

32	Sampdoria	1–1	Cagliari
	Castellini 14'		Suazo 68'

33	Cagliari	1–1	Palermo
	Suazo 45'		Di Michele 90 + 5'

34	Cagliari	1–1	Juventus
	Suazo 45' (pen.)		Cannavaro 90 + 5'

35	Ascoli	2–2	Cagliari
	Ferrante 18'; Domizzi 73' (pen.)		Suazo 53, 64'

36	Cagliari	3–1	Parma
	Capone 11'; Suazo 31' (pen.); Esposito 63'		Corradi 74'

37	Udinese	2–0	Cagliari
	Iaquinta 15'; Barreto 68'

38	Cagliari	2–2	Inter
	Capone 8'; Suazo 32'		Cruz 11'; Solari 37'

=== Top Scorers ===
- (Honduras) David Suazo 22 (5)
- (Italy) Mauro Esposito 5
- (Italy) Andrea Capone 3

=== Results summary ===
Overall								Home						Away					
Pld	W	D	L	GF	GA	GD	Pts	W	D	L	GF	GA	GD	W	D	L	GF	GA	GD
38	8	15	15	42	55	−13	39	6	11	2	23	17	+6	2	4	13	19	38	−19

== Sources ==
- RSSSF - Italy Championship 2005/06
