= 2004–05 Cagliari Calcio season =

Cagliari Calcio
2004-05 season
- Manager: Daniele Arrigoni
- Serie A: 12th
- Coppa Italia: Semi-final
- Top goalscorer: League: Mauro Esposito (16 goals); All: Mauro Esposito (19 goals)

Cagliari Calcio had a successful return to Serie A, finishing in 12th place and reaching the semi-finals of the Coppa Italia. This was much thanks to a trio of attacking players consisting of Mauro Esposito, David Suazo and Gianfranco Zola, with Esposito scoring 16 league goals, a personal record.

== Squad ==
=== Goalkeepers ===
- (Greece) Fanis Katergiannakis
- (Italy) Alex Brunner
- (Italy) Gennaro Iezzo

=== Defenders ===
- (Italy) Francesco Bega
- (Uruguay) Diego López
- (Italy) Alessandro Agostini
- (Italy) Simone Loria
- (Italy) Roberto Maltagliati
- (Italy) Francesco Pisano
- (Italy) Rocco Sabato

=== Midfielders ===
- (Italy) Alessandro Budel
- (Uruguay) Nelson Abeijón
- (Italy) Marcello Albino
- (Italy) Massimo Brambilla
- (Italy) Daniele Conti
- (Italy) Massimo Gobbi
- (Italy) Loris Del Nevo
- (Honduras) Edgar Álvarez
- (Italy) Fabio Macellari
- (Italy) Claudio Pani

=== Attackers ===
- (Italy) Antonio Langella
- (Italy) Gianfranco Zola
- (Honduras) David Suazo
- (Italy) Mauro Esposito
- (Italy) Rolando Bianchi
- (Argentina) Horacio Peralta

== Pre-season and friendlies ==
7 August 2004 Friendly	Tottenham (England)	1–2	(Italy) Cagliari	London, England
	Kanouté 55'	Report	Conti 59'; Albino 61'	Stadium: White Hart Lane

== Serie A ==
Pos	Team	Pld	W	D	L	GF	GA	GD	Pts	Qualification or relegation
10	Reggina	38	10	14	14	36	45	−9	44	
11	Lecce	38	10	14	14	66	73	−7	44	
12	Cagliari	38	10	14	14	51	60	−9	44	
13	Lazio (Note: Lazio gained entry to the 2005 UEFA Intertoto Cup after Messina and Livorno renounced.)	38	11	11	16	48	53	−5	44	Qualification to Intertoto Cup third round
14	Siena	38	9	16	13	44	55	−11	43	

Source: 2004–05 Serie A, RSSSF.com, Soccerway
Rules for classification: 1) Points; 2) Head-to-head points; 3) Head-to-head goal difference; 4) Goal difference; 5) Goals scored; 6) Draw. (Note: Head-to-head record is used only after all the matches between the teams in question have been played).

=== Matches ===
1	Cagliari	1–0	Bologna
	Esposito 19'

2	Fiorentina	2–1	Cagliari
	Miccoli 16'; Dainelli 90+1'		Suazo 90+3'

3	Cagliari	2–0	Siena
	Esposito 18'; Suazo 77'

4	Lecce	3–1	Cagliari
	Cassetti 57'; Giacomazzi 71'; Bjelanović 87'		Esposito 48'

5	Cagliari	2–1	Brescia
	Zola 13' (pen.); Langella 82'		Caracciolo 39'

6	Cagliari	0–1	Milan
			Pirlo 20'

7	Atalanta	2–2	Cagliari
	Pazzini 2'; Montolivo 40'		Esposito 12'; Loria 29'

8	Cagliari	2–1	Parma
	Abeijón 45+1'; Esposito 85'		Marchionni 63'

9	Roma	5–1	Cagliari
	Dellas 2'; Totti 6' (pen.); Perrotta 64'; Montella 90', 90+2'		Suazo 31'

10	Cagliari	0–0	Livorno

11	Sampdoria	0–0	Cagliari

12	Cagliari	3–3	Inter
	Zola 6' (pen.); Langella 33'; Esposito 61'		Stanković 35'; Martins 75', 89'

13	Lazio	2–3	Cagliari
	Pandev 7'; Oddo 80' (pen.)		Langella 34'; Esposito 65'; Zola 71'

14	Cagliari	4–2	Chievo
	Zola 33', 39' (pen.); Langella 45'; Abeijón 60'		Pellissier 58'; Amauri 88'

15	Reggina	3–2	Cagliari
	Paredes 8'; De Rosa 53', 76'		Langella 6'; Esposito 72'

16	Palermo	3–0	Cagliari
	Zauli 33'; Brienza 38'; Toni 39'

17	Cagliari	2–1	Messina
	Esposito 48'; Gobbi 55'		Zampagna 22'

18	Udinese	2–0	Cagliari
	Di Natale 23'; Pisano 59' (o.g.)

19	Cagliari	1–1	Juventus
	Zola 89'		Emerson 55'

20	Bologna	1–0	Cagliari
	Bellucci 70'

21	Cagliari	1–0	Fiorentina
	Esposito 11'

22	Siena	2–2	Cagliari
	Chiesa 4'; Flo 36'		López 57'; Bianchi 84'

23	Cagliari	3–1	Lecce
	Gobbi 10'; Esposito 72', 86'		Vučinić 38'

24	Brescia	2–0	Cagliari
	Zoboli 6'; Caracciolo 90'

25	Milan	1–0	Cagliari
	Serginho 90+2'

26	Cagliari	3–3	Atalanta
	Langella 10'; Esposito 43'; Abeijón 67'		Sala 18'; Makinwa 61'; Marcolini 90+1' (pen.)

27	Parma	3–2	Cagliari
	Gilardino 10'; Bovo 17'; F. Simplício 90+3'		Bonera 4' (o.g.); Suazo 89'

28	Cagliari	3–0	Roma
	Zola 24'; Esposito 41'; Suazo 48'

29	Livorno	3–3	Cagliari
	C. Lucarelli 36', 63'; Protti 39'		Suazo 42', 45+4' (pen.); Abeijón 90+2'

30	Cagliari	0–0	Sampdoria

31	Inter	2–0	Cagliari
	Zé Maria 40'; Martins 64'

32	Cagliari	1–1	Lazio
	Esposito 70'		Siviglia 90+1'

33	Chievo	1–1	Cagliari
	Pellissier 32'		Gobbi 72'

34	Cagliari	1–1	Reggina
	Bianchi 90+1'		Colucci 36'

35	Cagliari	0–0	Palermo

36	Messina	2–1	Cagliari
	D'Agostino 45+1' (pen.); Amoruso 87'		Álvarez 54'

37	Cagliari	1–1	Udinese
	Esposito 67'		Iaquinta 3'

38	Juventus	4–2	Cagliari
	Del Piero 43'; Trezeguet 51', 73'; Appiah 86'		Zola 60', 86'

=== Top Scorers ===
- (Italy) Mauro Esposito 16
- (Italy) Gianfranco Zola 9 (2)
- (Honduras) David Suazo 7 (1)
- (Italy) Antonio Langella 6

=== Results summary ===
Overall								Home						Away					
Pld	W	D	L	GF	GA	GD	Pts	W	D	L	GF	GA	GD	W	D	L	GF	GA	GD
38	10	14	14	51	60	−9	44	9	9	1	30	17	+13	1	5	13	21	43	−22

== Sources ==
- RSSSF - Italy Championship 2004/05
