= 2005–06 Inter Milan season =

Inter Milan
2005–06 season
- Owner: Massimo Moratti
- President: Giacinto Facchetti
- Head coach: Roberto Mancini
- Stadium: San Siro
- Serie A: 1st
- Coppa Italia: Winners
- UEFA Champions League: Quarter-finals
- Supercoppa Italiana: Winners
- Top goalscorer: League: Julio Cruz (15); All: Julio Cruz (21)
- Highest home attendance: 78,606 vs Juventus (12 February 2006)
- Lowest home attendance: 44,385 vs Empoli (21 December 2005)
- Average home league attendance: 51,371
| Home colours | Away colours | Third colours |

The 2005–06 season was Football Club Internazionale Milano's 97th in existence and 90th consecutive season in the top flight of Italian football.

== Season overview ==
The 2005–06 Serie A season opened with success in the Supercoppa Italiana, beating Juventus 1–0 in extra time with a goal scored by Verón. During the Champions League group stage, the side managed to have a line-up of 11 foreign players on the pitch: the only European was Luís Figo, playing the second time. Despite a good first half (also including a 3–2 win in derby, that lacked since 2002) Inter did not have a great second half, and knocked out in the Champions League by Villarreal.

On the pitch, the season finished like the previous with third place and the win of the Coppa Italia against Roma. However, during the summer after the World Cup, Juventus and A.C. Milan were caught in the Calciopoli scandal: in late July, a few weeks after Italian national team triumph in Germany, Juventus was stripped of the title, and Inter was awarded the 2005–06 title. Further, the relegation of Juventus to Serie B made Inter the only club to be present in all seasons of the modern Serie A (from 1929–30).

== Players ==
=== Squad information ===
As of 27 May 2006

| Squad no. | Name | Nationality | Position | Date of birth (age) |
Goalkeepers
| 1 | Francesco Toldo | (Italy) | GK | 2 December 1971 (aged 33) |
| 12 | Júlio César | (Brazil) | GK | 3 September 1979 (aged 25) |
| 22 | Paolo Orlandoni | (Italy) | GK | 12 August 1972 (aged 32) |
Defenders
| 2 | Iván Córdoba | (Colombia) | CB | 11 August 1976 (aged 28) |
| 3 | Nicolás Burdisso | (Argentina) | CB | 12 April 1981 (aged 24) |
| 4 | Javier Zanetti (Captain) | (Argentina) | RB / CM / RM | 10 August 1973 (aged 31) |
| 11 | Siniša Mihajlović (Note: Mihajlović was born in Vukovar, Yugoslavia (now Croatia), but also qualified to represent Serbia and Montenegro (now Serbia) internationally through his father and represented them internationally following the dissolution of Yugoslavia.) | (Serbia and Montenegro) | CB / DM / LB | 20 February 1969 (aged 36) |
| 13 | Zé Maria | (Brazil) | RB / RM | 25 July 1973 (aged 31) |
| 16 | Giuseppe Favalli | (Italy) | LB / CB | 8 January 1972 (aged 33) |
| 23 | Marco Materazzi | (Italy) | CB | 19 August 1973 (aged 31) |
| 25 | Walter Samuel | (Argentina) | CB | 23 March 1978 (aged 27) |
| 33 | Pierre Womé | (Cameroon) | LB / DM / LM | 26 March 1979 (aged 26) |
Midfielders
| 5 | Dejan Stanković | (Serbia and Montenegro) | CM / AM | 11 September 1978 (aged 26) |
| 6 | Cristiano Zanetti | (Italy) | DM / CM | 10 April 1977 (aged 28) |
| 7 | Luís Figo | (Portugal) | RW / AM | 4 November 1972 (aged 32) |
| 8 | David Pizarro | (Chile) | CM / DM | 11 September 1979 (aged 25) |
| 14 | Juan Sebastián Verón | (Argentina) | CM / DM / AM | 9 March 1975 (aged 30) |
| 18 | Kily González | (Argentina) | LW / AM | 4 August 1974 (aged 30) |
| 19 | Esteban Cambiasso | (Argentina) | DM | 18 August 1980 (aged 24) |
| 21 | Santiago Solari | (Argentina) | CM | 7 October 1976 (aged 28) |
| 31 | César | (Brazil) | LM / LB | 24 October 1974 (aged 30) |
Forwards
| 9 | Julio Cruz | (Argentina) | CF | 10 October 1974 (aged 30) |
| 10 | Adriano | (Brazil) | CF | 17 February 1982 (aged 23) |
| 20 | Álvaro Recoba | (Uruguay) | SS / LW / AM | 17 March 1976 (aged 29) |
| 30 | Obafemi Martins | (Nigeria) | CF | 28 October 1984 (aged 20) |

==== From youth squad ====
Note: Flags indicate national team as defined under FIFA eligibility rules; some limited exceptions apply. Players may hold more than one non-FIFA nationality.

| No. | Pos. | Nation | Player |
|---|---|---|---|
| 35 | GK | ITA | Paolo Tornaghi |
| 36 | DF | ITA | Simone Fautario |
| 38 | DF | ITA | Daniel Semenzato |
| 39 | MF | ITA | Matteo Lombardo |
| 40 | MF | CIV | Abdoulaye Diarra |
| 41 | MF | ITA | Jacopo Ravasi |
| 42 | FW | ITA | Domenico Germinale |
| 43 | FW | GHA | Basty Kyeremateng |
| 44 | FW | ITA | Matteo Momentè |
| 45 | GK | ITA | Matteo Piazza |

| No. | Pos. | Nation | Player |
|---|---|---|---|
| 46 | DF | ITA | Dennis Esposito |
| 47 | DF | ITA | Mattia Barni |
| 49 | DF | ITA | Marco Andreolli |
| 51 | DF | ITA | Leonardo Bonucci |
| 52 | MF | TUN | Tijani Belaid |
| 55 | MF | CMR | Daniel Maa Boumsong |
| 86 | MF | ITA | Ilario Aloe |
| 87 | GK | ITA | Giacomo Bindi |
| 89 | FW | SWE | Goran Slavkovski |

=== Transfers ===
In
| Pos. | Name | from | Type |
|---|---|---|---|
| GK | Júlio César | Chievo Verona | loan ended |
| MF | Luis Figo | Real Madrid | free |
| DF | Walter Samuel | Real Madrid | €16,0 million |
| MF | Santiago Solari | Real Madrid | €6,0 million |
| MF | David Pizarro | Udinese | €10,0 million |
| MF | Pierre Womé | Brescia | |
| DF | César | Lazio | loan |
| DF | Leonardo Bonucci | Viterbese | loan |
| FW | Goran Slavkovski | Malmö | |
| GK | Paolo Orlandoni | Piacenza | |
| MF | Sabri Lamouchi | Genoa | loan ended |

Out
| Pos. | Name | to | Type |
|---|---|---|---|
| FW | Christian Vieri | A.C. Milan | |
| MF | Edgar Davids | Tottenham Hotspur | |
| MF | Andy van der Meyde | Everton | €3,5 million |
| DF | Francesco Coco | Livorno | loan |
| DF | Carlos Gamarra | Palmeiras | released |
| MF | Emre Belozoglu | Newcastle United | €5,8 million |
| MF | Giorgos Karagounis | Benfica | |
| GK | Fabián Carini | Cagliari | loan |
| MF | Sabri Lamouchi | Marseille | |
| FW | Nicola Ventola | Atalanta | |
| MF | Domenico Morfeo | Parma | €7,5 million |
| FW | Lampros Choutos | Atalanta | loan |
| GK | Mathieu Moreau | Lucchese | co-ownership |
| DF | Giovanni Pasquale | Parma | loan |
| MF | Stéphane Dalmat | Racing Santander | €1 million |
| MF | Francisco Farinós | Mallorca | |

==== Winter ====
In
| Pos. | Name | from | Type |
|---|---|---|---|
| DF | Maxwell | Ajax | |
| MF | Lampros Choutos | Atalanta | loan ended |

Out
| Pos. | Name | from | Type |
|---|---|---|---|
| DF | Maxwell | Empoli | loan |
| MF | Lampros Choutos | Mallorca | loan |

=== Out ===
- Andy van der Meyde – Everton

== Pre-season and friendlies ==
=== Riscone di Brunico training camp ===
| 17 July 2005 Friendly | Selezione Mila | 0–10 | Inter Milan | Bruneck, Italy |
| | | Report | González 9'; Cruz 20', 26'; Recoba 24', 30'; Martins 51'; Solari 65'; Choutos 71'; Momentè 79', 85' | Stadium: Riscone di Brunico; Referee: Schienin (Italy) |

| 20 July 2005 Friendly | Bolzano | 0–3 | Inter Milan | Bruneck, Italy |
| | | Report | Choutos 24', 48'; Diarra 69' | Stadium: Riscone di Brunico; Referee: Bellutti (Italy) |

| 27 July 2005 Friendly | Inter Milan | 1–1 | Cagliari | Bruneck, Italy |
| | Esposito 4' | Report | Recoba 11' | Stadium: Riscone di Brunico; Referee: Romeo (Italy) |

| 27 July 2005 Friendly | Inter Milan | 2–1 | Bolzano | Bruneck, Italy |
| | Cruz 10'; Ravasi 22' | Report | Lucchini 7' | Stadium: Riscone di Brunico; Referee: Oscar Girardi (Italy) |

| 29 July 2005 Friendly | Inter Milan | 1–4 | Treviso | Bruneck, Italy |
| | Recoba 18' (pen.) | Report | Cottafava 10'; Gallo 14' (pen.); Reginaldo 26'; Piovaccari 84' | Stadium: Riscone di Brunico |

=== TIM Trophy ===
| 20 July 2005 Friendly | Inter Milan | 0–0 (5–4 p) | Milan | Trieste, Italy |
| 21:00 CEST | | Report | | Stadium: Stadio Nereo Rocco; Referee: Nicola Rizzoli (Italy) |
| | Penalties |
| | Arrieta (penalty missed); Júlio César (penalty scored); Materazzi (penalty scored); Martins (penalty scored); Solari (penalty scored); Womé (penalty scored) | | Seedorf (penalty scored); Rui Costa (penalty scored); Serginho (penalty missed); Costacurta (penalty scored); Ardemagni (penalty scored); Ambrosini (penalty missed) |

| 20 July 2005 Friendly | Inter Milan | 1–0 | Juventus | Bruneck, Italy |
| 23:00 CEST | Martins 43' | Report | | Stadium: Riscone di Brunico; Referee: Tiziano Pieri (Italy) |

=== Südtirol Cup ===
| 23 July 2005 Friendly | Inter Milan | 2–1 | Bordeaux | Bruneck, Italy |
| | Cruz 26'; Martins 51' | Report | Šmicer 54' | Stadium: Riscone di Brunico; Referee: Romeo (Italy) |

| 25 July 2005 Friendly | Leicester City | 1–2 | Inter Milan | Leicester, England |
| | O'Grady 87' (pen.) | Report | Solari 26'; Choutos 31' | Stadium: King Power Stadium; Referee: Phil Dowd (England) |

=== Birra Moretti Trophy ===
| 12 August 2005 Friendly | Inter Milan | 0–2 | Juventus | Naples, Italy |
| 20:30 CEST | | Report | Ibrahimović 1', 9' | Stadium: Stadio San Paolo; Referee: Matteo Trefoloni (Italy) |

| 12 August 2005 Friendly | Napoli | 2–1 | Inter Milan | Naples, Italy |
| 21:30 CEST | Bogliacino 13'; Piá 23' | Report | Recoba 22' (pen.) | Stadium: Stadio San Paolo; Referee: Antonio Dattilo (Italy) |

=== Sky TV Trophy ===
| 16 August 2005 Friendly | IF Elfsborg | 0–2 | Inter Milan | Varberg, Sweden |
| | | Report | Cruz 23', 48' | Stadium: Påskbergsvallen; Referee: Miro Ukalovic (Sweden) |

| 25 August 2005 Friendly | Inter Milan | 2–1 | Al-Ittihad | Appiano Gentile, Italy |
| | Figo 4'; Choutos 22' | Report | Kallon 26' | Stadium: Angelo Moratti Sports Centre; Referee: Raccuia (Italy) |

=== Other friendlies ===
| 27 July 2005 Friendly | Crystal Palace | 0–2 | Inter Milan | Selhurst, London, England |
| | | Report | Martins 19'; Karagounis 66' | Stadium: Selhurst Park; Referee: Leon Williamson (England) |

| 29 July 2005 Friendly | Norwich City | 0–2 | Inter Milan | Norwich, Norfolk, England |
| | | Report | Choutos 32'; Martins 85' | Stadium: Carrow Road; Referee: Dermot Gallagher (England) |

| 31 July 2005 Friendly | Portsmouth | 0–2 | Inter Milan | Portsmouth, England |
| | | Report | Pizarro 55'; Stanković 77' | Stadium: Fratton Park; Referee: Dermot Gallagher (England) |

| 6 August 2005 Friendly | Lecco | 0–4 | Inter Milan | Lecco, Italy |
| | | Report | Adriano 31' (pen.); Martins 37'; Zé Maria 58'; Recoba 71' | Stadium: Stadio Rigamonti-Ceppi; Referee: Andrea Gervasoni (Italy) |

| 2 September 2005 Trofeo Pirelli | Udinese | 2–1 | Inter Milan | Udine, Italy |
| | Di Michele 63'; Tissone 79' | Report | Cruz 19' | Stadium: Stadio Friuli; Referee: Oscar Girardi (Italy) |

| 9 October 2005 Friendly | Inter Milan | 3–1 | Chiasso | Appiano Gentile, Italy |
| | Cruz 7'; Solari 51'; Momentè 71' | Report | Roselli 47' | Stadium: Angelo Moratti Sports Centre; Referee: Mauro Gangai (Italy) |

| 17 October 2005 Friendly | Inter Milan | 0–1 | Venezuela | Milan, Italy |
| | | Report | Maldonado | Stadium: San Siro |

| 13 November 2005 Friendly | Inter Milan | 4–0 | Lugano | Appiano Gentile, Italy |
| | Pizarro 12'; Figo 58', 70'; Martins 61' | Report | | Stadium: Angelo Moratti Sports Centre |

| 5 January 2006 Friendly | Inter Milan | 3–0 | Pizzighettone | Appiano Gentile, Italy |
| | Stanković 16'; Recoba 51'; Solari 72' | Report | | Stadium: Angelo Moratti Sports Centre; Referee: Mauro Gangai (Italy) |

| 14 February 2006 Friendly | Inter Milan | 1–0 | Lecco | Appiano Gentile, Italy |
| | Recoba 54' | Report | | Stadium: Angelo Moratti Sports Centre; Referee: Mauro Gangai (Italy) |

== Competitions ==
=== Overview ===
| Competition | First match | Last match | Starting round | Final position | Record | | | | | | | |
| Competition | First match | Last match | Starting round | Final position | Pld | W | D | L | GF | GA | GD | Win % |
|---|---|---|---|---|---|---|---|---|---|---|---|---|
| Serie A | 28 August 2005 | 14 May 2006 | Matchday 1 | Winners | 38 | 23 | 7 | 8 | 68 | 30 | +38 | 60.53 |
| Coppa Italia | 30 November 2005 | 11 May 2006 | Round of 16 | Winners | 8 | 4 | 4 | 0 | 10 | 6 | +4 | 50.00 |
| Supercoppa Italiana | 20 August 2005 | | Final | Winners | 1 | 1 | 0 | 0 | 1 | 0 | +1 | 100.00 |
| Champions League | 10 August 2005 | 4 April 2006 | Third qualifying round | Quarter-finals | 12 | 7 | 3 | 2 | 17 | 9 | +8 | 58.33 |
| Total | | | | | 59 | 35 | 14 | 10 | 96 | 45 | +51 | 59.32 |

Last updated: 14 May 2006
Source: Soccerway

=== Serie A ===
==== League table ====
| Pos | Team | Pld | W | D | L | GF | GA | GD | Pts | Qualification or relegation |
|---|---|---|---|---|---|---|---|---|---|---|
| 1 | Inter Milan (C) | 38 | 23 | 7 | 8 | 68 | 30 | +38 | 76 | Qualification to Champions League group stage |
| 2 | Roma | 38 | 19 | 12 | 7 | 70 | 42 | +28 | 69 | Qualification to Champions League group stage |
| 3 | Milan (Note: Milan, Fiorentina and Lazio were docked 30 points, all for involvement in the Calciopoli.) | 38 | 28 | 4 | 6 | 85 | 31 | +54 | 58 | Qualification to Champions League third qualifying round |
| 4 | Chievo | 38 | 13 | 15 | 10 | 54 | 49 | +5 | 54 | Qualification to Champions League third qualifying round |
| 5 | Palermo | 38 | 13 | 13 | 12 | 50 | 52 | −2 | 52 | Qualification to UEFA Cup first round |

Source: 2005–06 Serie A, Soccerway
Rules for classification: 1) points; 2) goal difference; 3) number of goals scored.
(C) Champions

==== Results summary ====
| Overall | | | | | | | | Home | | | | | | Away | | | | | |
| Pld | W | D | L | GF | GA | GD | Pts | W | D | L | GF | GA | GD | W | D | L | GF | GA | GD |
|---|---|---|---|---|---|---|---|---|---|---|---|---|---|---|---|---|---|---|---|
| 38 | 23 | 7 | 8 | 68 | 30 | +38 | 76 | 16 | 1 | 2 | 47 | 13 | +34 | 7 | 6 | 6 | 21 | 17 | +4 |

Last updated: 14 May 2006.
Source: Competitive matches

==== Results by round ====
| Round | 1 | 2 | 3 | 4 | 5 | 6 | 7 | 8 | 9 | 10 | 11 | 12 | 13 | 14 | 15 | 16 | 17 | 18 | 19 | 20 | 21 | 22 | 23 | 24 | 25 | 26 | 27 | 28 | 29 | 30 | 31 | 32 | 33 | 34 | 35 | 36 | 37 | 38 |
|---|---|---|---|---|---|---|---|---|---|---|---|---|---|---|---|---|---|---|---|---|---|---|---|---|---|---|---|---|---|---|---|---|---|---|---|---|---|---|
| Ground | H | A | H | A | H | A | H | A | H | A | A | H | A | H | H | A | H | A | H | A | H | A | H | A | H | A | H | A | H | H | A | H | A | A | H | A | H | A |
| Result | W | L | W | W | W | L | W | W | L | D | D | W | W | W | W | W | W | D | W | W | W | W | W | L | L | D | W | D | W | W | L | W | W | L | W | L | D | D |
| Position | 1 | 8 | 6 | 4 | 2 | 4 | 3 | 3 | 4 | 4 | 4 | 4 | 4 | 3 | 2 | 2 | 2 | 3 | 2 | 2 | 2 | 2 | 2 | 2 | 2 | 3 | 3 | 3 | 3 | 3 | 3 | 3 | 3 | 3 | 3 | 3 | 3 | 1 |

Source: Competitive matches
A = Away; H = Home; W = Win; D = Draw; L = Loss; = Leader, UEFA Champions League Groups stage; = UEFA Champions League Groups stage; = UEFA Champions League Qualifying round; = 2006–07 UEFA Cup; = 2006–07 Serie B; R = 2006–07 Serie B, Juventus were originally the first-placed team, but were placed at the bottom of the league table due to the Calciopoli scandal, relegating them to Serie B.
The title was put sub judice, then assigned to Internazionale, the team taking the first place after the courts.
Milan, Fiorentina and Lazio were docked 30 points, all for involvement in the Calciopoli.

==== Matches ====
| 28 August 2005 1 | Inter Milan | 3–0 | Treviso | Milan |
| 15:00 CET | Adriano 32', 68', 79'; Cambiasso (yellow card) 40' | Report | Filippini (yellow card) 25'; Dellafiore (yellow card) 70'; Lorenzi (yellow card) 86' | Stadium: San Siro; Attendance: 51,524; Referee: Paolo Tagliavento |

| 10 September 2005 2 | Palermo | 3–2 | Inter Milan | Palermo |
| 18:00 CET | Corini 20'; Terlizzi 50'; Santana (yellow card) 54'; Makinwa 68'; Brienza (yellow card) 87' | Report | Zé Maria (yellow card) 70'; Materazzi (yellow card) 79'; Cruz 86', 90+2' | Stadium: Stadio Renzo Barbera; Attendance: 31,909; Referee: Gianluca Paparesta |

| 17 September 2005 3 | Inter Milan | 3–0 | Lecce | Milan |
| 20:30 CET | Martins 25'; Stanković 29'; Cruz 84' (yellow card) 84' | Report | Cassetti (yellow card) 40' | Stadium: San Siro; Attendance: 48,219; Referee: Tiziano Pieri |

| 21 September 2005 4 | Chievo | 0–1 | Inter Milan | Verona |
| 20:30 CET | Franceschini (yellow card) 51'; Giunti (yellow card) 82' | Report | Samuel 49'; C. Zanetti (yellow card) 60'; Stanković (yellow card) 84' | Stadium: Stadio Marc'Antonio Bentegodi; Attendance: 16,471; Referee: Emidio Morganti |

| 25 September 2005 5 | Inter Milan | 1–0 | Fiorentina | Milan |
| 20:30 CET | Martins 7'; Verón (yellow card) 17'; Materazzi (yellow card) 64' | Report | Jørgensen (yellow card) 20'; Gamberini (yellow card) 49'; Donadel (yellow card) 73' | Stadium: San Siro; Attendance: 56,907; Referee: Stefano Farina |

| 2 October 2005 6 | Juventus | 2–0 | Inter Milan | Turin |
| 19:30 CET | Trezeguet 22'; Vieira (yellow card) 31'; Nedvěd 34'; Emerson (yellow card) 45' | Report | Córdoba (yellow card) 28'; Materazzi (yellow card) 40'; Favalli (yellow card) 90' | Stadium: Stadio delle Alpi; Attendance: 33,772; Referee: Gianluca Paparesta |

| 16 October 2005 7 | Inter Milan | 5–0 | Livorno | Milan |
| 15:00 CET | Materazzi 9'; Verón (yellow card) 11'; Cruz 19'; Cambiasso 49'; Córdoba 51'; Recoba 61' | Report | Coco (red card) 46' | Stadium: San Siro; Attendance: 51,413; Referee: Pasquale Rodomonti |

| 23 October 2005 8 | Udinese | 0–1 | Inter Milan | Udine |
| 15:00 CET | Pinzi (yellow card) 6'; Bertotto (yellow card) 25' | Report | Córdoba (yellow card) 9'; Recoba (yellow card) 23'; Cruz 36' | Stadium: Stadio Friuli; Attendance: 19,234; Referee: Daniele Tombolini |

| 26 October 2005 9 | Inter Milan | 2–3 | Roma | Milan |
| 20:30 CET | Materazzi (yellow card) 33'; Samuel (yellow card) 39'; Adriano 67', 77'; Verón (red card) 90' | Report | Montella 12'; Chivu (yellow card) 15'; Totti 30', 47' (pen.) (red card) 90'; Mancini (yellow card) 51'; Doni (yellow card) 55' | Stadium: San Siro; Attendance: 50,230; Referee: Roberto Rosetti |

| 29 October 2005 10 | Sampdoria | 2–2 | Inter Milan | Genoa |
| 18:00 CET | Diana 6', 35' (yellow card) 63' | Report | Cambiasso 31'; Córdoba 40'; Figo (yellow card) 72'; Favalli (yellow card) 79' | Stadium: Stadio Luigi Ferraris; Attendance: 27,726; Referee: Stefano Farina |

| 5 November 2005 11 | Lazio | 0–0 | Inter Milan | Rome |
| 20:30 CET | Baronio (yellow card) 89'; Inzaghi (yellow card) 90' | Report | Materazzi (yellow card) 7'; Mihajlović (yellow card) 30'; Figo (yellow card) 71' | Stadium: Stadio Olimpico; Attendance: 35,000; Referee: Domenico Messina |

| 20 November 2005 12 | Inter Milan | 2–0 | Parma | Milan |
| 20:30 CET | C. Zanetti (yellow card) 34'; Figo 68'; Cambiasso 81'; Materazzi (yellow card) 87' | Report | Simplício (yellow card) 13'; Corradi (yellow card) 69' | Stadium: San Siro; Attendance: 47,651; Referee: Gianluca Rocchi |

| 27 November 2005 13 | Messina | 1–2 | Inter Milan | Messina |
| 15:00 CET | Sculli (yellow card) 18'; Di Napoli 71'; D'Agostino (yellow card) 72' | Report | Recoba 7'; Favalli (yellow card) 18'; Cambiasso 59' | Stadium: Stadio San Filippo; Attendance: 24,418; Referee: Matteo Trefoloni |

| 3 December 2005 14 | Inter Milan | 1–0 | Ascoli | Milan |
| 20:35 CET | Adriano 24'; C. Zanetti (yellow card) 82' | Report | | Stadium: San Siro; Attendance: 46,112; Referee: Andrea De Marco |

| 11 December 2005 15 | Inter Milan | 3–2 | Milan | Milan |
| 20:30 CET | Córdoba (yellow card) 14'; Adriano 24' (pen.), 90+1' (yellow card) 90+2'; Martins 59' | Report | Nesta (yellow card) 23'; Shevchenko 39' (pen.); Kaladze (yellow card) 58'; Šimić (yellow card) 74'; Stam 83' | Stadium: San Siro; Attendance: 76,416; Referee: Domenico Messina |

| 18 December 2005 16 | Reggina | 0–4 | Inter Milan | Reggio Calabria |
| 15:00 CET | Lauro (yellow card) 45'; Tedesco (yellow card) 66' | Report | Córdoba 2' (yellow card) 58'; Martins 15'; Stanković (yellow card) 36'; Adriano 40'; Cambiasso (yellow card) 53'; Pizarro 90' | Stadium: Stadio Oreste Granillo; Attendance: 23,850; Referee: Paolo Bertini |

| 21 December 2005 17 | Inter Milan | 4–1 | Empoli | Milan |
| 20:30 CET | Adriano 4'; Cruz 45+5'; Figo 67'; Martins 85' | Report | Lucchini (yellow card) 29'; Vannucchi 64' | Stadium: San Siro; Attendance: 44,385; Referee: Oscar Girardi |

| 8 January 2006 18 | Siena | 0–0 | Inter Milan | Siena |
| 15:00 CET | Foglio (yellow card) 26'; Valentim (yellow card) 29' | Report | Verón (yellow card) 62' | Stadium: Stadio Artemio Franchi – Montepaschi Arena; Attendance: 27,726; Referee: Massimiliano Saccani |

| 15 January 2006 19 | Inter Milan | 3–2 | Cagliari | Milan |
| 15:00 CET | Martins 10' (yellow card) 87'; Adriano 14', 58' (pen.); Favalli (yellow card) 16' | Report | Esposito 20'; Abeijón (yellow card) 37'; Gobbi (yellow card) 56'; Suazo 81'; Bega (yellow card) 82' | Stadium: San Siro; Attendance: 47,354; Referee: Antonio Dattilo |

| 18 January 2006 20 | Treviso | 0–1 | Inter Milan | Treviso |
| 20:30 CET | Parravicini (yellow card) 3'; Lazzaretti (yellow card) 71' | Report | Burdisso (yellow card) 10'; González (yellow card) 18'; Cruz 22'; Samuel (yellow card) 83' | Stadium: Stadio Omobono Tenni; Attendance: 7,985; Referee: Marco Gabriele |

| 21 January 2006 21 | Inter Milan | 3–0 | Palermo | Milan |
| 20:30 CET | Cambiasso 33'; Samuel (yellow card) 50'; Córdoba (yellow card) 55' (goal) 76'; Favalli (yellow card) 60'; Figo 80' | Report | Zaccardo (yellow card) 26'; Barone (yellow card) 63' | Stadium: San Siro; Attendance: 48,942; Referee: Tiziano Pieri |

| 29 January 2006 22 | Lecce | 0–2 | Inter Milan | Lecce |
| 20:30 CET | Ledesma (yellow card) 60' (yellow-red card) 75'; Ângelo (yellow card) 66' | Report | J. Zanetti (yellow card) 69'; Figo 71'; Burdisso (yellow card) 74'; Verón (yellow card) 90+1'; Stanković 90+3' | Stadium: Stadio Via del Mare; Attendance: 15,832; Referee: Matteo Trefoloni |

| 5 February 2006 23 | Inter Milan | 1–0 | Chievo | Milan |
| 15:00 CET | Cruz 7'; Córdoba (yellow card) 10'; Burdisso (yellow card) 60' | Report | D'Anna (yellow card) 7' | Stadium: San Siro; Attendance: 47,347; Referee: Salvatore Racalbuto |

| 8 February 2006 24 | Fiorentina | 2–1 | Inter Milan | Florence |
| 20:30 CET | Brocchi 10'; Jiménez 58' (yellow card) 86'; Fiore (yellow card) 70' | Report | J. Zanetti (yellow card) 29'; Figo (yellow card) 76'; Recoba 85' | Stadium: Stadio Artemio Franchi; Attendance: 41,399; Referee: Matteo Trefoloni |

| 12 February 2006 25 | Inter Milan | 1–2 | Juventus | Milan |
| 20:30 CET | Samuel (yellow card) 65' (goal) 74'; Cambiasso (yellow card) 87' | Report | Ibrahimović (yellow card) 29' (goal) 63'; Chiellini (yellow card) 41'; Buffon (yellow card) 65'; Del Piero 85' | Stadium: San Siro; Attendance: 78,606; Referee: Gianluca Paparesta |

| 18 February 206 26 | Livorno | 0–0 | Inter Milan | Livorno |
| 18:00 CET | Colucci (yellow card) 53' | Report | Materazzi (yellow card) 23'; Pizarro (yellow card) 47'; C. Zanetti (yellow card) 61' | Stadium: Stadio Armando Picchi; Attendance: 15,473; Referee: Paolo Bertini |

| 26 February 2006 27 | Inter Milan | 3–1 | Udinese | Milan |
| 15:00 CET | Cruz 18', 48' (pen.); Martins 60'; Samuel (red card) 66' | Report | Obodo (yellow card) 44'; Zapata (yellow card) 80' (yellow-red card) 83'; Iaquinta 83' (pen.) | Stadium: San Siro; Attendance: 45,698; Referee: Paolo Dondarini |

| 5 March 2006 28 | Roma | 1–1 | Inter Milan | Rome |
| 20:30 CET | Taddei 9' (yellow card) 85'; Dacourt (yellow card) 78' | Report | J. Zanetti (yellow card) 37'; Materazzi (yellow card) 65' (goal) 89' | Stadium: Stadio Olimpico; Attendance: 46,500; Referee: Tiziano Pieri |

| 11 March 2006 29 | Inter Milan | 1–0 | Sampdoria | Milan |
| 20:30 CET | Adriano 40' (yellow card) 49'; Stanković (yellow card) 81' | Report | Falcone (yellow card) 66' | Stadium: San Siro; Attendance: 48,826; Referee: Nicola Rizzoli |

| 19 March 2006 30 | Inter Milan | 3–1 | Lazio | Rome |
| 15:00 CET | César (yellow card) 28'; Figo 36'; Recoba (yellow card) 46' (goal) 46', 72' | Report | Cribari (yellow card) 9'; Pandev 54' | Stadium: Stadio Olimpico; Attendance: 48,818; Referee: Tiziano Pieri |

| 25 March 2006 31 | Parma | 1–0 | Inter Milan | Parma |
| 17:00 CET | Bonera (yellow card) 10'; Pisanu (yellow card) 36'; Simplício 39'; Ferronetti (yellow card) 83'; Corradi (yellow card) 87' | Report | Materazzi (yellow card) 24'; Samuel (yellow card) 54'; J. Zanetti (yellow card) 80'; Stanković (yellow card) 83' | Stadium: Stadio Ennio Tardini; Attendance: 18,033; Referee: Paolo Tagliavento |

| 1 April 2006 32 | Inter Milan | 3–0 | Messina | Milan |
| 20:30 CET | Solari 15', 26'; Martins 19' | Report | Donati (yellow card) 54' | Stadium: San Siro; Attendance: 45,671; Referee: Pasquale Rodomonti |

| 8 April 2006 33 | Ascoli | 1–2 | Inter Milan | Ascoli Piceno |
| 20:30 CET | Ferrante 21'; Guana (yellow card) 27'; Coppola (yellow card) 51'; Foggia (yellow card) 70' | Report | Samuel (yellow card) 23'; Cruz 51' (pen.) (yellow card) 85' (yellow-red card) 85'; Mihajlović 59' | Stadium: Stadio Cino e Lillo Del Duca; Attendance: 17,235; Referee: Stefano Farina |

| 14 April 2006 34 | Milan | 1–0 | Inter Milan | Milan |
| 18:00 CET | Cafu (yellow card) 27'; Pirlo (yellow card) 64'; Kaladze 70'; Gilardino (yellow card) 77'; Seedorf (yellow card) 89' | Report | Materazzi (yellow card) 52'; C. Zanetti (yellow card) 61'; Burdisso (yellow card) 88'; Córdoba (yellow card) 90+4' | Stadium: San Siro; Attendance: 74,137; Referee: Massimo De Santis |

| 22 April 2006 35 | Inter Milan | 4–0 | Reggina | Milan |
| 15:00 CET | Cruz 16' (pen.), 90+2'; Martins 23'; César 28' | Report | | Stadium: San Siro; Attendance: 46,129; Referee: Nicola Rizzoli |

| 30 April 2006 36 | Empoli | 1–0 | Inter Milan | Empoli |
| 15:00 CET | Riganò (yellow card) 75'; Materazzi 90+1' (o.g.) | Report | César (yellow card) 76' | Stadium: Stadio Carlo Castellani; Attendance: 7,068; Referee: Paolo Bertini |

| 7 May 2006 37 | Inter Milan | 1–1 | Siena | Milan |
| 15:00 CET | Cruz (yellow card) 44' (goal) 59'; Burdisso (red card) 89' | Report | Gastaldello (yellow card) 44' (goal) 90+3'; Paro (yellow card) 81'; Vergassola (yellow card) 89' | Stadium: San Siro; Attendance: 46,470; Referee: Andrea De Marco |

| 14 May 2006 38 | Cagliari | 2–2 | Inter Milan | Cagliari |
| 15:00 CET | Capone 8'; Suazo 33' | Report | Cruz 11'; Womé (yellow card) 25'; Solari 37'; Samuel (yellow card) 75'; González (yellow card) 77' | Stadium: Stadio Sant'Elia; Attendance: 14,000; Referee: Paolo Mazzoleni |

=== Coppa Italia ===
==== Round of 16 ====
| 30 November 2005 First leg | Parma | 0–1 | Inter Milan | Parma |
| 21:05 CET | | Report | Martins 74' | Stadium: Stadio Ennio Tardini; Referee: Emidio Morganti |

| 12 January 2006 Second leg | Inter Milan | 0–0 (1–0 agg.) | Parma | Milan |
| 21:00 CET | | Report | | Stadium: San Siro; Referee: Antonio Giannoccaro |

==== Quarter-finals ====
| 24 January 2006 First leg | Lazio | 1–1 | Inter Milan | Rome |
| 21:00 CET | Manfredini 27' | Report | Stanković 26' | Stadium: Stadio Olimpico; Referee: Nicola Rizzoli |

| 2 February 2006 Second leg | Inter Milan | 1–0 (2–1 agg.) | Lazio | Milan |
| 21:00 CET | Stanković 37' | Report | | Stadium: San Siro; Referee: Emidio Morganti |

==== Semi-finals ====
| 22 March 2006 First leg | Inter Milan | 1–0 | Udinese | Milan |
| 21:00 CET | Solari 20' | Report | | Stadium: San Siro; Referee: Massimiliano Saccani |

| 11 April 2006 Second leg | Udinese | 2–2 (2–3 agg.) | Inter Milan | Udine |
| 15:30 CET | Obodo 83'; Iaquinta 90' (pen.) | Report | Solari 8'; Pizarro 86' | Stadium: Stadio Friuli; Referee: Nicola Ayroldi |

==== Final ====
| 3 May 2006 First leg | Roma | 1–1 | Inter Milan | Rome |
| 15:00 CET | Taddei (yellow card) 43'; Mancini 55'; Mexès (yellow card) 71' | Report | Cruz 8' (yellow card) 12'; Samuel (yellow card) 66'; Pizarro (yellow card) 90'; Martins (yellow card) 90' | Stadium: Stadio Olimpico; Attendance: 64,000; Referee: Matteo Trefoloni |

| 11 May 2006 Second leg | Inter Milan | 3–1 (4–2 agg.) | Roma | Milan |
| 20:30 CET | Cambiasso 6'; Cruz 46'; Martins 76' | Report | Kharja (yellow card) 36'; Nonda 80'; Rosi (yellow card) 83'; Bovo (yellow card) 84' | Stadium: San Siro; Attendance: 59,000; Referee: Domenico Messina |

=== Supercoppa Italiana ===
| 20 August 2005 | Juventus | 0–1 (a.e.t.) | Inter Milan | Turin |
| 20:45 CET | | Report | Verón 96' | Stadium: Stadio delle Alpi; Attendance: 35,246; Referee: Massimo De Santis |

=== UEFA Champions League ===
==== Qualifying phase ====
===== Third qualifying round =====
| 10 August 2005 First leg | Shakhtar Donetsk (Ukraine) | 0–2 | (Italy) Inter Milan | Donetsk, Ukraine |
| 20:00 CET | Duljaj (yellow card) 35'; Matuzalém (yellow card) 39'; Brandão (yellow card) 63' | Report | Córdoba (yellow card) 17'; Adriano (yellow card) 59' (goal) 79'; Cambiasso (yellow card) 62'; Martins 68' | Stadium: RSC Olimpiyskiy; Attendance: 32,000; Referee: Alain Hamer (Luxembourg) |

| 24 August 2005 Second leg | Inter Milan (Italy) | 1–1 (3–1 agg.) | (Ukraine) Shakhtar Donetsk | Milan, Italy |
| 21:00 CET | Recoba 12'; Verón (yellow card) 17'; Solari (yellow card) 63'; Materazzi (yellow card) 69'; Pizarro (yellow card) 82' | Report | Elano 24' | Stadium: San Siro; Attendance: 30,000; Referee: Herbert Fandel (Germany) |

==== Group stage ====
| Pos | Team | Pld | W | D | L | GF | GA | GD | Pts | Qualification |
|---|---|---|---|---|---|---|---|---|---|---|
| 1 | (Italy) Internazionale | 6 | 4 | 1 | 1 | 9 | 4 | +5 | 13 | Advance to knockout stage |
| 2 | (Scotland) Rangers | 6 | 1 | 4 | 1 | 7 | 7 | 0 | 7 | Advance to knockout stage |
| 3 | (Slovakia) Artmedia Bratislava | 6 | 1 | 3 | 2 | 5 | 9 | −4 | 6 | Transfer to UEFA Cup |
| 4 | (Portugal) Porto | 6 | 1 | 2 | 3 | 8 | 9 | −1 | 5 | |

Source: RSSSF

| 12 September 2005 1 | Petržalka (Slovakia) | 0–1 | (Italy) Inter Milan | Bratislava, Slovakia |
| 20:45 CET | Staňo (yellow card) 11' | Report | Verón (yellow card) 8' (yellow-red card) 56'; Cruz 17'; C. Zanetti (yellow card) 36' | Stadium: Tehelné pole Attendance: 27,000; Referee: Eric Poulat (France) |

| 28 September 2005 2 | Inter Milan (Italy) | 1–0 | (Scotland) Rangers | Milan, Italy |
| 20:45 CET | Figo (yellow card) 29'; Córdoba (yellow card) 35'; Pizarro 49' | Report | Waterreus (yellow card) 37' | Stadium: San Siro; Attendance: Closed doors Referee: Kyros Vassaras (Greece) |

| 19 October 2005 3 | Porto (Portugal) | 2–0 | (Italy) Inter Milan | Porto, Portugal |
| 20:45 CET | Materazzi 22' (o.g.); McCarthy 35'; Pepe (yellow card) 53' | Report | Cruz (yellow card) 41'; Córdoba (yellow card) 45+2'; Favalli (yellow card) 79' | Stadium: Estádio do Dragão; Attendance: 50,000; Referee: Valentin Ivanov (Russia) |

| 1 November 2005 4 | Inter Milan (Italy) | 2–1 | (Portugal) Porto | Milan, Italy |
| 20:45 CET | Cruz 75' (pen.), 82' | Report | Almeida 16'; Bosingwa (yellow card) 90+1' | Stadium: San Siro; Attendance: Closed doors Referee: Manuel Mejuto González (Spain) |

| 23 November 2005 5 | Inter Milan (Italy) | 4–0 | (Slovakia) Petržalka | Milan, Italy |
| 20:45 CET | Figo 28'; Adriano 41', 59', 74' | Report | Petráš (yellow card) 45' | Stadium: San Siro; Attendance: Closed doors Referee: Mike Riley (England) |

| 6 December 2005 6 | Rangers (Scotland) | 1–1 | (Italy) Inter Milan | Glasgow, Scotland |
| 20:45 CET | Løvenkrands 38'; Kyrgiakos (yellow card) 65'; Andrews (yellow card) 82' | Report | Adriano 30'; C. Zanetti (yellow card) 45+1' (yellow-red card) 87'; Pizarro (yellow card) 75'; Momente (yellow card) 90+2' | Stadium: Ibrox Stadium; Attendance: 49,150; Referee: Konrad Plautz (Austria) |

==== Knockout phase ====
===== Round of 16 =====
| 22 February 2006 First leg | Ajax (Netherlands) | 2–2 | (Italy) Inter Milan | Amsterdam, Netherlands |
| 20:45 CET | Huntelaar 16'; Rosales 20'; Rosenberg (yellow card) 78' | Report | Stanković 49'; Córdoba (yellow card) 69'; Pizarro (yellow card) 74'; Cruz (yellow card) 84' (goal) 86' | Stadium: Amsterdam Arena; Attendance: 46,650; Referee: Wolfgang Stark (Germany) |

| 14 March 2006 Second leg | Inter Milan (Italy) | 1–0 (3–2 agg.) | (Netherlands) Ajax | Milan, Italy |
| 20:45 CET | Stanković 57' | Report | Vermaelen (yellow card) 65' | Stadium: San Siro; Attendance: 48,850; Referee: Peter Fröjdfeldt (Sweden) |

===== Quarter-finals =====
| 29 March 2006 First leg | Inter Milan (Italy) | 2–1 | (Spain) Villarreal | Milan, Italy |
| 20:45 CET | Adriano 7'; Recoba (yellow card) 27'; Martins 54'; Samuel (yellow card) 62'; Verón (yellow card) 90+1' | Report | Forlán 1'; Sorín (yellow card) 34'; Senna (yellow card) 34' | Stadium: San Siro; Attendance: 49,150; Referee: Alain Sars (France) |

| 4 April 2006 Second leg | Villarreal (Spain) | 1–0 (a2–2 agg.) | (Italy) Inter Milan | Villarreal, Spain |
| 20:45 CET | Tacchinardi (yellow card) 22'; Arruabarrena 58'; Viera (yellow card) 90+4' | Report | Figo (yellow card) 57'; Martins (yellow card) 90+2' | Stadium: Estadio El Madrigal; Attendance: 23,000; Referee: Kyros Vassaras (Greece) |

== Statistics ==
=== Squad statistics ===
| | League | Europe | Cup | Others | Total Stats |
|---|---|---|---|---|---|
| Games played | 38 | 12 | 8 | 1 | 59 |
| Games won | 23 | 7 | 4 | 1 | 35 |
| Games drawn | 7 | 3 | 4 | 0 | 14 |
| Games lost | 8 | 2 | 0 | 0 | 10 |
| Goals scored | 68 | 17 | 10 | 1 | 96 |
| Goals conceded | 30 | 9 | 6 | 0 | 45 |
| Goal difference | 38 | 8 | 4 | 1 | 51 |
| Clean sheets | 19 | 5 | 4 | 1 | 29 |
| Goal by substitute | – | – | – | – | – |
| Total shots | – | – | – | – | – |
| Shots on target | – | – | – | – | – |
| Corners | – | – | – | – | – |
| Players used | 31 | 27 | 25 | 14 | – |
| Offsides | – | – | – | – | – |
| Fouls suffered | – | – | – | – | – |
| Fouls committed | – | – | – | – | – |
| Yellow cards | 72 | 25 | 4 | 0 | 101 |
| Red cards | 4 | 2 | – | – | 6 |

Last updated: 14 May 2006
Source: Soccerway, Calcio.com

=== Appearances and goals ===
As of 14 May 2006

| No. | Pos | Nat | Player | Total | | Serie A | | Coppa | | Champions League | |
| No. | Pos | Nat | Player | Apps | Goals | Apps | Goals | Apps | Goals | Apps | Goals |
|---|---|---|---|---|---|---|---|---|---|---|---|
| 12 | GK | (Brazil) BRA | Júlio César | 40 | -23 | 29 | -23 | 4 | 0 | 7 | 0 |
| 4 | DF | (Argentina) ARG | Zanetti J | 38 | 0 | 25 | 0 | 3+2 | 0 | 7+1 | 0 |
| 23 | DF | (Italy) ITA | Materazzi | 38 | 2 | 18+4 | 2 | 5+1 | 0 | 9+1 | 0 |
| 25 | DF | (Argentina) ARG | Samuel | 41 | 2 | 26+1 | 2 | 4+1 | 0 | 9 | 0 |
| 2 | DF | (Colombia) COL | Cordoba | 47 | 4 | 35 | 4 | 2+1 | 0 | 9 | 0 |
| 7 | MF | (Portugal) POR | Figo | 45 | 6 | 28+6 | 5 | 2+1 | 0 | 8 | 1 |
| 19 | MF | (Argentina) ARG | Cambiasso | 47 | 6 | 30+4 | 5 | 2+1 | 1 | 9+1 | 0 |
| 14 | MF | (Argentina) ARG | Veron | 34 | 0 | 24+1 | 0 | 0 | 0 | 9 | 0 |
| 5 | MF | (Serbia and Montenegro) SCG | Stankovic | 37 | 6 | 21+2 | 2 | 4+2 | 2 | 7+1 | 2 |
| 10 | FW | (Brazil) BRA | Adriano | 46 | 19 | 27+3 | 13 | 4+1 | 0 | 10+1 | 6 |
| 9 | FW | (Argentina) ARG | Cruz | 46 | 21 | 17+14 | 15 | 7+1 | 2 | 4+3 | 4 |
| 1 | GK | (Italy) ITA | Toldo | 17 | -5 | 8 | -5 | 4 | 0 | 5 | 0 |
| 16 | DF | (Italy) ITA | Favalli | 30 | 0 | 22+1 | 0 | 3+1 | 0 | 3 | 0 |
| 30 | FW | (Nigeria) NGR | Martins | 42 | 13 | 18+10 | 9 | 2+3 | 2 | 5+4 | 2 |
| 8 | MF | (Chile) CHI | Pizarro | 39 | 3 | 15+9 | 1 | 7 | 1 | 4+4 | 1 |
| 3 | DF | (Argentina) ARG | Burdisso | 26 | 0 | 11+5 | 0 | 5+1 | 0 | 3+1 | 0 |
| 20 | FW | (Uruguay) URU | Recoba | 29 | 6 | 11+9 | 5 | 1+1 | 0 | 4+3 | 1 |
| 18 | MF | (Argentina) ARG | Kily | 22 | 0 | 10+6 | 0 | 3+1 | 0 | 0+2 | 0 |
| 33 | DF | (Cameroon) CMR | Wome | 26 | 0 | 10+3 | 0 | 5 | 0 | 8 | 0 |
| 21 | MF | (Argentina) ARG | Solari | 26 | 5 | 8+5 | 3 | 6+1 | 2 | 6 | 0 |
| 6 | MF | (Italy) ITA | Zanetti C | 23 | 0 | 7+7 | 0 | 5 | 0 | 2+2 | 0 |
| 13 | DF | (Brazil) BRA | Zé Maria | 12 | 0 | 6+2 | 0 | 0 | 0 | 0+4 | 0 |
| 31 | MF | (Brazil) BRA | César | 13 | 1 | 5+3 | 1 | 1+2 | 0 | 2 | 0 |
| 11 | DF | (Serbia and Montenegro) SCG | Mihajlovic | 13 | 1 | 4+1 | 1 | 4+1 | 0 | 1+2 | 0 |
| 49 | DF | (Italy) ITA | Andreolli | 5 | 0 | 1+1 | 0 | 2 | 0 | 1 | 0 |
| 22 | GK | (Italy) ITA | Orlandoni | 1 | -2 | 1 | -2 | 0 | 0 | 0 | 0 |
| 55 | MF | (Cameroon) CMR | Boumsong | 3 | 0 | 1 | 0 | 1 | 0 | 0+1 | 0 |
| 51 | DF | (Italy) ITA | Bonucci | 1 | 0 | 0+1 | 0 | 0 | 0 | 0 | 0 |
| 85 | MF | (Italy) ITA | Aloe | 1 | 0 | 0+1 | 0 | 0 | 0 | 0 | 0 |
| 42 | FW | (Italy) ITA | Germinale | 1 | 0 | 0+1 | 0 | 0 | 0 | 0 | 0 |
| 61 | FW | (Sweden) SWE | Slavkovski | 1 | 0 | 0+1 | 0 | 0 | 0 | 0 | 0 |
| 44 | FW | (Italy) ITA | Momente | 3 | 0 | 0 | 0 | 2 | 0 | 0+1 | 0 |

- Source: http://calcio-seriea.net/presenze/2005/1274/
