= 2006–07 Cagliari Calcio season =

Cagliari Calcio
2006-07 season
- Manager: Marco Giampaolo; Franco Colomba
- Serie A: 17th
- Coppa Italia: 3rd Round
- Top goalscorer: League: David Suazo (14); All: David Suazo (15)

Cagliari Calcio only just managed to stay up in Serie A, with key player David Suazo scoring 14 goals, to help clinching the survival. Finishing a point above Chievo in the relegation zone, Cagliari both dismissed and reappointed Marco Giampaolo over the course of the season, following a brief stint from Franco Colomba.

== Serie A ==
Pos	Team	Pld	W	D	L	GF	GA	GD	Pts	Qualification or relegation
15	Siena (Note: Siena were given a one-point deduction for a delay in payment of social security contributions.)	38	9	14	15	35	45	−10	40	
16	Torino	38	10	10	18	27	47	−20	40	
17	Cagliari	38	9	13	16	35	46	−11	40	
18	Chievo (R)	38	9	12	17	38	48	−10	39	Relegation to Serie B
19	Ascoli (R)	38	5	12	21	36	67	−31	27	Relegation to Serie B

Rules for classification: 1) points; 2) goal difference; 3) number of goals scored.
(R) Relegated

== Squad ==
=== Goalkeepers ===
- (Italy) Simone Aresti
- (Italy) Antonio Chimenti
- (Italy) Marco Fortin

=== Defenders ===
- (Italy) Michele Canini
- (Uruguay) Diego López
- (Italy) Cristiano Del Grosso
- (Italy) Francesco Pisano
- (Portugal) José Semedo
- (Italy) Paolo Bianco
- (Uruguay) Joe Bizera
- (Italy) Michele Ferri
- (Italy) Alessandro Agostini

=== Midfielders ===
- (Italy) Simone Pepe
- (Italy) Davide Marchini
- (Italy) Daniele Conti
- (Italy) Alessandro Budel
- (Italy) Alessandro Conticchio
- (Italy) Leonardo Colucci
- (Italy) Antonino D'Agostino
- (Italy) Salvatore Burrai
- (Argentina) Gabriel Peñalba

=== Attackers ===
- (Italy) Mauro Esposito
- (Honduras) David Suazo
- (Italy) Andrea Capone
- (Italy) Andrea Cocco
- (Italy) Antonio Langella

== Sources ==
- RSSSF - Italy Championship 2006/07
