= 2013–14 Cagliari Calcio season =

Cagliari
2013–14 season
- President: Massimo Cellino
- Manager: Diego López (until 18 February 2014); Ivo Pulga
- Stadium: Stadio Sant'Elia
- Serie A: 15th
- Coppa Italia: Round of 16
- Top goalscorer: League: Mauricio Pinilla (7); All: Mauricio Pinilla (8)
- Average home league attendance: 4,636
| Home colours | Away colours | Third colours |

The 2013–14 season has been Cagliari Calcio's 11th consecutive season in Serie A. The team competed in Serie A and the Coppa Italia.

== Players ==
=== Squad information ===
Note: Flags indicate national team as defined under FIFA eligibility rules; some limited exceptions apply. Players may hold more than one non-FIFA nationality.

| No. | Pos. | Nation | Player |
|---|---|---|---|
| 1 | GK | ITA | Marco Silvestri (on loan from Chievo) |
| 3 | DF | ITA | Alessandro Bastrini |
| 4 | MF | BEL | Radja Nainggolan |
| 4 | MF | ITA | Andrea Tabanelli (on loan from Cesena) |
| 5 | MF | ITA | Daniele Conti (captain) |
| 7 | MF | ITA | Andrea Cossu |
| 8 | DF | BRA | Danilo Avelar |
| 9 | FW | ITA | Marco Sau |
| 10 | MF | MKD | Agim Ibraimi (on loan from Maribor) |
| 13 | DF | ITA | Davide Astori (vice-captain) |
| 14 | DF | ITA | Francesco Pisano |
| 15 | DF | ITA | Luca Rossettini |
| 16 | MF | SWE | Sebastian Eriksson |
| 18 | FW | BRA | Nenê |

| No. | Pos. | Nation | Player |
|---|---|---|---|
| 19 | DF | GRE | Marios Oikonomou |
| 20 | MF | SWE | Albin Ekdal |
| 21 | MF | ITA | Daniele Dessena |
| 22 | MF | URU | Matías Cabrera |
| 23 | FW | COL | Víctor Ibarbo |
| 24 | DF | ITA | Gabriele Perico |
| 25 | GK | SRB | Vlada Avramov |
| 26 | GK | ESP | Antonio Adán |
| 27 | MF | URU | Matías Vecino (on loan from Fiorentina) |
| 28 | GK | ITA | Werther Carboni |
| 29 | DF | ITA | Nicola Murru |
| 32 | MF | BRA | Adryan |
| 34 | DF | ITA | Dario Del Fabro |
| 36 | MF | ITA | Andrea Demontis |
| 38 | FW | ITA | Simone Solinas |
| 51 | FW | CHI | Mauricio Pinilla |

== Competitions ==
=== Serie A ===
==== League table ====
| Pos | Team | Pld | W | D | L | GF | GA | GD | Pts |
|---|---|---|---|---|---|---|---|---|---|
| 13 | Udinese | 38 | 12 | 8 | 18 | 46 | 57 | −11 | 44 (Note: Udinese finished ahead of Genoa on head-to-head away goals scored: Udinese 1-0 Genoa, Udinese 3-3 Genoa.) |
| 14 | Genoa | 38 | 11 | 11 | 16 | 41 | 50 | −9 | 44 |
| 15 | Cagliari | 38 | 9 | 12 | 17 | 34 | 53 | −19 | 39 |
| 16 | Chievo | 38 | 10 | 6 | 22 | 34 | 54 | −20 | 36 |
| 17 | Sassuolo | 38 | 9 | 7 | 22 | 43 | 72 | −29 | 34 |

Source: Serie A, Soccerway
Rules for classification: 1st points; 2nd head-to-head points; 3rd head-to-head goal difference; 4th goal difference; 5th number of goals scored; 6th public draw.
(Head-to-head record is applied for clubs with the same number of points only once all matches between said clubs have been played)
