= Francesco Pisano =

Italian footballer

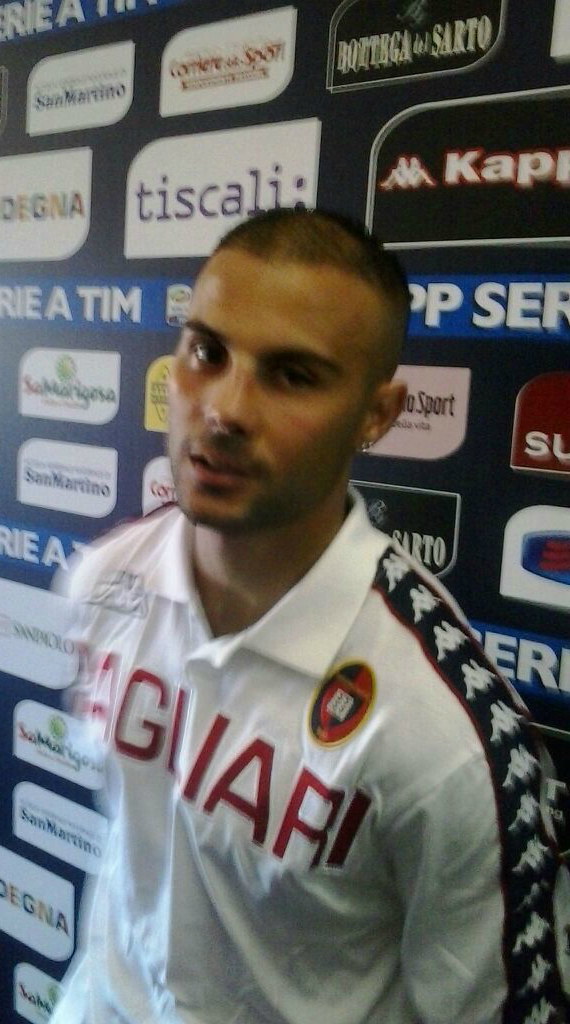

Personal information
- Full name: Francesco Pisano
- Date of birth: 29 April 1986 (age 40)
- Place of birth: Cagliari, Italy
- Height: 1.74 m (5 ft 8 1/2 in)
- Position: Right back

Youth career
- Cagliari

Senior career*
| Years | Team | Apps | (Gls) |
| 2004–2015 | Cagliari | 231 | (1) |
| 2015–2016 | Bolton Wanderers | 3 | (0) |
| 2016 | → Avellino (loan) | 13 | (0) |
| 2016–2022 | Olbia | 133 | (5) |

International career^{‡}
| 2004 | Italy U-19 | 1 | (0) |
| 2006–2009 | Italy U-21 | 12 | (0) |
- * Club domestic league appearances and goals as of 23 April 2022 ‡ National team caps and goals as of 5 September 2021

Francesco Pisano (born 29 April 1986) is an Italian former professional footballer who played as a right back.

== Club career ==
On 20 August 2015, Pisano signed for Bolton Wanderers on a two-year contract. Pisano made his debut for the club on 26 September in a 2-2 draw with Brighton & Hove Albion. This would be his first of only three games for the club.

On 1 February 2016, Pisano joined Avellino on loan until the end of the season.

On 25 August 2016 Pisano was signed by Lega Pro newcomer Olbia.

== Career statistics ==
As of match played 5 September 2021

Appearances and goals by club, season and competition
| Club | Season | League | | | National Cup | | League Cup | | Other | | Total | |
| Club | Season | Division | Apps | Goals | Apps | Goals | Apps | Goals | Apps | Goals | Apps | Goals |
|---|---|---|---|---|---|---|---|---|---|---|---|---|
| Cagliari | 2004–05 | Serie A | 13 | 0 | 5 | 0 | — | | — | | 18 | 0 |
| Cagliari | 2005–06 | Serie A | 24 | 0 | 4 | 0 | — | | — | | 28 | 0 |
| Cagliari | 2006–07 | Serie A | 23 | 0 | 2 | 0 | — | | — | | 25 | 0 |
| Cagliari | 2007–08 | Serie A | 17 | 0 | 1 | 0 | — | | — | | 18 | 0 |
| Cagliari | 2008–09 | Serie A | 29 | 0 | 1 | 0 | — | | — | | 30 | 0 |
| Cagliari | 2009–10 | Serie A | 9 | 0 | 0 | 0 | — | | — | | 9 | 0 |
| Cagliari | 2010–11 | Serie A | 18 | 0 | 0 | 0 | — | | — | | 18 | 0 |
| Cagliari | 2011–12 | Serie A | 34 | 0 | 1 | 0 | — | | — | | 35 | 0 |
| Cagliari | 2012–13 | Serie A | 28 | 1 | 1 | 0 | — | | — | | 29 | 1 |
| Cagliari | 2013–14 | Serie A | 23 | 0 | 0 | 0 | — | | — | | 23 | 0 |
| Cagliari | 2014–15 | Serie A | 13 | 0 | 1 | 0 | — | | — | | 14 | 0 |
| Cagliari | Cagliari Total | | 231 | 1 | 16 | 0 | — | | — | | 247 | 1 |
| Bolton Wanderers | 2015–16 | Championship | 3 | 0 | 0 | 0 | 0 | 0 | — | | 3 | 0 |
| Bolton Wanderers | Bolton Wanderers Total | | 3 | 0 | 0 | 0 | 0 | 0 | — | | 3 | 0 |
| Avellino (loan) | 2015–16 | Serie B | 13 | 0 | 0 | 0 | — | | — | | 13 | 0 |
| Olbia | 2016–17 | Serie C | 23 | 1 | — | | — | | 0 | 0 | 23 | 1 |
| Olbia | 2017–18 | Serie C | 23 | 1 | — | | — | | 1 (Note: Appearance(s) in the Coppa Italia Serie C.) | 0 | 24 | 1 |
| Olbia | 2018–19 | Serie C | 20 | 1 | — | | — | | 2 | 0 | 22 | 1 |
| Olbia | 2019–20 | Serie C | 26 | 1 | — | | — | | 3 (Note: One appearance in the Coppa Italia Serie C, and two appearances in the Serie C relegation play-offs) | 0 | 29 | 1 |
| Olbia | 2020–21 | Serie C | 14 | 1 | — | | — | | 0 | 0 | 14 | 1 |
| Olbia | 2021–22 | Serie C | 1 | 0 | — | | — | | 1 | 0 | 2 | 0 |
| Olbia | Olbia Total | | 107 | 5 | — | | — | | 6 | 0 | 114 | 5 |
| Career total | | | 354 | 6 | 16 | 0 | 0 | 0 | 6 | 0 | 377 | 6 |
