= Antonio Chimenti =

Italian footballer (born 1970)

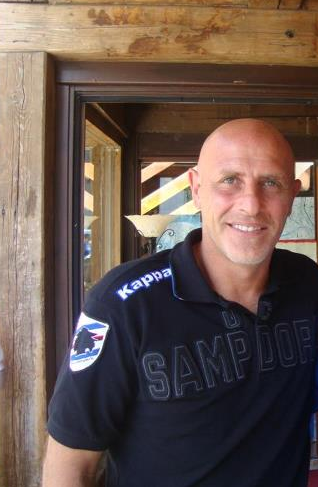
- Chimenti in 2012

Personal information
- Full name: Antonio Chimenti
- Date of birth: 30 June 1970 (age 56)
- Place of birth: Bari, Italy
- Height: 1.82 m (6 ft 0 in)
- Position: Goalkeeper

Team information
- Current team: Uzbekistan (goalkeeping coach)

Youth career
- Sambenedettese

Senior career*
Years	Team	Apps	(Gls)
1988–1991	Sambenedettese	5	(0)
1991–1992	→ Tempio (loan)	35	(0)
1992–1993	→ Monza (loan)	4	(0)
1993–1997	Salernitana	137	(0)
1997–1999	Roma	32	(0)
1999–2002	Lecce	98	(0)
2002–2006	Juventus	11	(0)
2006–2007	Cagliari	43	(0)
2007–2008	Udinese	3	(0)
2008–2010	Juventus	2	(0)
Total		370	(0)

Managerial career
- 2011–2012: Juventus (youth)
- 2012: Sampdoria (goalkeeping coach)
- 2014–2019: Italy U-21 (goalkeeping coach)
- 2019–2020: Italy U-20 (goalkeeping coach)
- 2020: SPAL (technical coach)
- 2022–2023: SPAL (goalkeeping coach)
- 2025–: Uzbekistan (goalkeeping coach)
- * Club domestic league appearances and goals

Antonio Chimenti (born 30 June 1970) is an Italian retired professional footballer who played as a goalkeeper, and current goalkeeping coach of Uzbekistan national team.

== Club career ==
=== S.S. Sambenedettese Calcio ===
Chimenti began his career in the youth academy of S.S. Sambenedettese Calcio. In 1988, he was promoted to the first team. After two more seasons spent in Sambenedettese in Serie C1 and then Serie C2, he was loaned out to Tempio in the Serie C2 as well. With Tempio he managed 35 appearances as the club's starting goalkeeper. For the 1992–93 season, Chimenti was loaned out to AC Monza Brianza who played in the Serie B. Following just 4 appearances with the club, he returned to Sambenedettese for the 1993–94 season, but was sold simultaneously to Salernitana Calcio. With Sambenedettese, Chimenti made just five first team appearances.

=== Salernitana Calcio ===
In August 1993, Chimenti was sold permanently to Salerno-based club, Salernitana Calcio. In his first season with Salernitana, Chimenti appeared 27 times, helping lead his team to promotion to the Serie B, from the Serie C1. During the next three seasons, Salernitana remained in Serie B, with Chimenti totaling 110 additional appearances. Following his good form, he was scouted by Franco Sensi of Serie A club, AS Roma.

=== A.S. Roma ===
In the summer of 1997, Chimenti transferred to Serie A side A.S. Roma, following his good form in Salerno. On 21 September 1997, Chimenti made his Serie A debut with the capital club, in a match Roma won 3–1 versus US Lecce. He obtained 7 more appearances that season, and during his second season with the club, Chimenti appeared on a more regular bases, making 24 Serie A starts and hence totaling 32 appearances in two years with Roma. Following his spell in the Eternal City, Chimenti transferred to fellow Serie A club, US Lecce.

=== US Lecce ===
In 1999, he transferred to US Lecce on a three-year deal. He was instantly inserted into the club's starting line-up and made 33 appearances for his new club, in his first season. He appeared an additional 34 times during 2000–01 Serie A campaign, and totaled 31 appearances the following season. After displaying decent form with the club, in his three-year spell, Chimenti transferred to Serie A, and European powerhouse, Juventus.

=== Juventus ===
During the 2002 summer transfer market, Chimenti was purchased by Juventus, to serve as a back-up for the world's number one ranked goalkeeper, and Italian International, Gianluigi Buffon, replacing former back-up Michelangelo Rampulla. In his first season with the Turin based club, Chimenti made 4 Serie A appearances as Juventus won the title, and also appeared in Juventus's second-round UEFA Champions League defeat to Manchester United, at Old Trafford; Juventus went on to reach the final of the competition, only to lose out to domestic rivals AC Milan on penalties. He backed these appearances up with 2 more appearances the following season in the league; although Juventus finished in a disappointing third place in Serie A, Chimenti featured in the club's run to the 2004 Coppa Italia final, only to be defeated by Lazio, and even made two appearances in the 2003–04 UEFA Champions League. During the 2004–05 Serie A season, Chimenti was again limited to just 2 appearances as Juventus won another Serie A title, which was later revoked, however, due to the club's involvement in the 2006 Italian football scandal. For the 2005–06 Serie A season, Buffon suffered a major injury during pre-season, and was set to miss up to 4 months of action. It seemed as though Chimenti was set to fill in for Gigi, and he even started in Juventus's defeat to Inter in the 2005 Supercoppa Italiana; however, in the latter portions of the 2005 summer transfer window, Juventus obtained the loan of Christian Abbiati from Milan, as the club looked for a more reliable first choice keeper. Buffon returned to action in late November, but after just one game, he was struck with injury again, and Abbiati returned to the line-up. After another disappointing season on the Juventus bench, and just 4 additional appearances, the veteran, Chimenti, transferred to Cagliari Calcio on a two-year deal in January 2006. Despite having six months in his Juventus contract left, Chimenti moved to Cagliari on a free transfer.

=== Cagliari Calcio ===
After his Bosman transfer to Cagliari Calcio, from Juventus, Chimenti was back in the starting eleven of Serie A football. He was the starter for the Sardinian club for the remainder of the season, making 21 appearances. In his second season with the club, Chimenti made an additional 22 appearances, totaling 43 appearances in a season and a half. In June 2007, Chimenti's contract was not renewed and he became a free agent.

=== Udinese Calcio ===
On 29 June 2007, Chimenti signed a one-year deal with Udinese Calcio, again on a free transfer. He was signed by the club to serve as an experienced reserve to Samir Handanovic. During his lone season in Udine, he made three appearances in the 2007–08 Serie A season.

=== Return to Juventus ===
On 19 July 2008, at 38 years old, Chimenti surprisingly returned to Juventus. He originally signed on a season long loan deal in exchange for Emanuele Belardi, who moved in the opposite direction on the same terms. Just weeks after his arrival, Juventus also purchased Austrian International keeper, Alexander Manninger, hence Chimenti became the third choice goalkeeper at Juventus for the 2008–09 Serie A season. In January 2009, Chimenti transferred to Juventus on a permanent basis while Belardi did the same for Udinese. He failed to make an official appearance for the club that season, but on 14 March 2010, due to injuries sustained by Buffon and Manninger, Chimenti was included in the starting eleven in the match against AC Siena, his first game with the club since his return. Juve failed to secure the victory though, as the match ended 3–3. Chimenti also started the next two games for Juventus against Fulham in the UEFA Europa League, and UC Sampdoria in Serie A, both of which ended in defeats. In total, Chimenti made 34 appearances for Juventus.

== Style of play ==
Nicknamed Zucchina, Chimenti was known for his physical strength, confidence, longevity, mentality, concentration, and consistency as a goalkeeper, as well as for his ability with the ball at his feet in particular, having played as a forward as a youngster (like his father, Vito), which allowed him to control passes, retain possession under pressure, and even challenge opponents for the ball. In his youth, his role models were fellow former Juventus goalkeepers Dino Zoff and Stefano Tacconi, who inspired him to change position. A late bloomer, Chimenti reached his prime in his early 30s, undergoing noticeable improvements under his goalkeeping coach at Lecce, Franco Paleari, who helped him develop his agility, goalkeeping technique, and explosive power, which aided him in his shot-stopping, ability to get to ground quickly, and penalty saving abilities. Paleari praised him in 2000 for his personality and will to grow. Chimenti was less effective at rushing off his line to come out and claim crosses, however.

== Coaching career ==
In October 2022, he joined Serie B club SPAL as a goalkeeping coach following the appointment of Daniele De Rossi as new boss.

== Personal life ==
Chimenti's father, Francesco, and uncle, Vito, were both also footballers.

== Career statistics ==
Appearances and goals by club, season and competition
Club	Season	League			Cup		Europe		Other		Total	
Club	Season	Division	Apps	Goals	Apps	Goals	Apps	Goals	Apps	Goals	Apps	Goals
Sambenedettese	1990–91	Serie C2	5	0	0	0	—		—		5	0
Tempio	1991–92	Serie C2	34	0	0	0	—		—		34	0
Monza	1992–93	Serie B	4	0	0	0	—		—		4	0
Salernitana	1993–94	Serie C1	27	0	3	0	—		3	0	33	0
Salernitana	1994–95	Serie B	37	0	0	0	—		—		37	0
Salernitana	1995–96	Serie B	36	0	0	0	—		—		36	0
Salernitana	1996–97	Serie B	37	0	0	0	—		—		37	0
Salernitana	Total		137	0	3	0	—		3	0	143	0
Roma	1997–98	Serie A	8	0	1	0	—		—		9	0
Roma	1998–99	Serie A	24	0	4	0	8	0	—		36	0
Roma	Total		32	0	5	0	8	0	—		45	0
Lecce	1999–2000	Serie A	33	0	4	0	—		—		37	0
Lecce	2000–01	Serie A	34	0	2	0	—		—		36	0
Lecce	2001–02	Serie A	31	0	0	0	—		—		31	0
Lecce	Total		98	0	6	0	—		—		104	0
Juventus	2002–03	Serie A	4	0	4	0	2	0	0	0	10	0
Juventus	2003–04	Serie A	2	0	8	0	2	0	0	0	12	0
Juventus	2004–05	Serie A	2	0	2	0	1	0	—		5	0
Juventus	2005–06	Serie A	3	0	0	0	0	0	1	0	4	0
Juventus	Total		11	0	14	0	5	0	1	0	31	0
Cagliari	2005–06	Serie A	21	0	0	0	—		—		21	0
Cagliari	2006–07	Serie A	22	0	3	0	—		—		25	0
Cagliari	Total		43	0	3	0	—		—		46	0
Udinese	2007–08	Serie A	3	0	4	0	—		—		7	0
Juventus	2008–09	Serie A	0	0	0	0	0	0	—		0	0
Juventus	2009–10	Serie A	2	0	0	0	1	0	—		3	0
Juventus	Total		2	0	0	0	1	0	—		3	0
Career total			370	0	35	0	14	0	4	0	423	0

== Honours ==
Juventus

- Serie A (1): 2002–03; Runner-up (1): 2008–09
- Coppa Italia Runner-up (1): 2003–04
- Supercoppa Italiana (2): 2002, 2003; Runner-up (1): 2005
- UEFA Champions League Runner-up (1): 2002–03
