= Trofeo Pirelli =

- Founded: 1998
- Abolished: 2010
- Teams: 2
- Last champions: Internazionale (11 times)
- Most championships: Internazionale (11 times)

The Pirelli Cup was an annual friendly football tournament sponsored by the Pirelli Tyre company. The competition was started in 1996 as a single 90-minute friendly match between Pirelli-sponsored Internazionale and another invited team. Since 1996, 14 editions of the one-match tournament have been held. The latest edition of the competition was held in 2010 in Baltimore, featuring Inter Milan and Manchester City. The match ended 3–0 as Inter won the trophy.

== Winners ==
=== List of finals ===
Year	Champion	Score	Runner-up
1996	(Italy) Internazionale	3–0	(England) Manchester United
1997	(Italy) Internazionale	1–1 (4–1) pen.	(England) Manchester United
1998	(England) Liverpool	2–1	(Italy) Internazionale
1999	(Spain) Real Madrid	3–2	(Italy) Internazionale
2000	(Italy) Internazionale	2–2 (6–5) pen.	(Greece) Olympiakos
2001	(Italy) Internazionale	2–1	(England) Watford
2002	(Italy) Internazionale	2–1	(Italy) Roma
2003	(Italy) Internazionale	1–0	(Spain) Real Sociedad
2004	(Italy) Fiorentina	2–2 (5–4) pen.	(Italy) Internazionale
2005	(Italy) Udinese	2–1	(Italy) Internazionale
2006	(Italy) Internazionale	1–0	(Spain) Mallorca
2007	(Italy) Internazionale	3–2	(England) Manchester United
2008	(Italy) Internazionale	1–0	(Germany) Bayern Munich
2009	(Italy) Internazionale	1–0	(France) AS Monaco
2010	(Italy) Internazionale	3–0	(England) Manchester City

=== Titles by club ===
Team	Titles
(Italy) Internazionale	11
(England) Liverpool	1
(Spain) Real Madrid	1
(Italy) Fiorentina	1
(Italy) Udinese	1

=== Participation by club ===
Below is the participation by club listed, grouped by country.

Participation(s)	Team(s)
15	(Italy) Internazionale
3	(England) Manchester United
1	(Germany) Bayern Munich (Italy) Fiorentina (England) Liverpool (Spain) Mallorca (England) Manchester City (France) Monaco (Greece) Olympiakos (Spain) Real Sociedad (Spain) Real Madrid (Italy) Roma (Italy) Udinese (England) Watford

== Top goalscorers ==
Rank	Name	Team(s)	Goals
1	(Italy) Marco Branca	Internazionale	2
1	(Spain) Fernando Morientes	Real Madrid	2
1	(Honduras) David Suazo	Internazionale	2
1	(Nigeria) Victor Obinna	Internazionale	2

== See also ==
- TIM Trophy
