= Andrea Conti (footballer, born 1977) =

Italian football forward

Personal information
- Date of birth: 23 August 1977 (age 49)
- Place of birth: Rome, Italy
- Height: 1.78 m (5 ft 10 in)
- Position: Striker

Senior career*
Years	Team	Apps	(Gls)
1996–1997	Roma	2	(0)
1997–1998	Carpi	7	(0)
1998–1999	Fano	7	(1)
1999–2000	Nocerina	5	(0)
2000–2001	Lecco	12	(0)
2001–2002	Castel di Sangro	15	(1)
2002–2003	Brescello	26	(4)
2003–2005	Virtus Lanciano	33	(3)
2005–2006	Ancona	20	(5)
2006–2007	Virtus Lanciano	36	(2)
2007–2013	Bellinzona	92	(14)
2013–2015	Malcantone		
- * Club domestic league appearances and goals

Andrea Conti (born 23 August 1977) is an Italian football manager and former player who played as a forward. He is the son of the 1982 World Cup winner Bruno Conti. His brother Daniele was also a professional footballer.
