= 1999–2000 US Lecce season =

U.S. Lecce
1999–2000 season
- President: Mario Moroni
- Head coach: Alberto Cavasin
- Stadium: Stadio Via del mare
- Serie A: 13th
- Coppa Italia: Group stage
- Top goalscorer: League: Cristiano Lucarelli (15); All: Cristiano Lucarelli (17)
Home colours	Away colours	Third colours

The 1999–2000 season was the 73rd season in the existence of U.S. Lecce and the club's first season back in the top flight of Italian football. In addition to the domestic league, Lecce participated in this season's edition of the Coppa Italia.

== Competitions ==
=== Overall record ===
Competition	First match	Last match	Starting round	Final position	Record							
Competition	First match	Last match	Starting round	Final position	Pld	W	D	L	GF	GA	GD	Win %
Serie A	29 August 1999	14 May 2000	Matchday 1	13th	34	10	10	14	33	49	−16	29.41
Coppa Italia	15 August 1999	15 September 1999	Group stage	Group stage	6	4	1	1	12	5	+7	66.67
Total					40	14	11	15	45	54	−9	35.00

Source: Competitions

=== Serie A ===
==== League table ====
Pos	Team	Pld	W	D	L	GF	GA	GD	Pts	Qualification or relegation
11	Bologna	34	9	13	12	32	39	−7	40 (Note: REG: 9 pts; BOL: 4 pts → BOL 2–0 LEC; LEC: 4 pts → LEC 1–1 BOL)	
12	Reggina	34	9	13	12	31	42	−11	40	
13	Lecce	34	10	10	14	33	49	−16	40	
14	Bari	34	10	9	15	34	48	−14	39	
15	Torino (R)	34	8	12	14	35	47	−12	36	Relegation to Serie B

Source: Serie A, RSSSF.com, Soccerway
Rules for classification: 1) Points; 2) Head-to-head points; 3) Head-to-head goal difference; 4) Goal difference; 5) Goals scored; 6) Draw. (Note: Head-to-head record is used only after all the matches between the teams in question have been played).
(R) Relegated

==== Results summary ====
Overall								Home						Away					
Pld	W	D	L	GF	GA	GD	Pts	W	D	L	GF	GA	GD	W	D	L	GF	GA	GD
0	0	0	0	0	0	0	0	0	0	0	0	0	0	0	0	0	0	0	0

Source: Serie A

==== Results by round ====
Round	1	2	3	4	5	6	7	8	9	10	11	12	13	14	15	16	17	18	19	20	21	22	23	24	25	26	27	28	29	30	31	32	33	34
Ground	H	A	A	H	A	H	A	H	H	A	H	A	H	A	H	A	H	A	H	H	A	H	A	H	A	A	H	A	H	A	H	A	H	A
Result	D	L	D	W	L	W	L	L	W	L	W	L	W	D	D	W	D	D	W	L	L	D	L	L	D	L	W	D	D	L	W	L	W	L
Position																																		

Source: Serie A
A = Away; H = Home; W = Win; D = Draw; L = Loss

==== Matches ====
29 August 1999 1	Lecce	2–2	Milan	Lecce
CEST (UTC+2)				Stadium: Stadio Via del mare Referee: Alfredo Trentalange

12 September 1999 2	Hellas Verona	2–0	Lecce	Verona
CEST (UTC+2)				Stadium: Stadio Marcantonio Bentegodi; Referee: Daniele Tombolini

19 September 1999 3	Piacenza	1–1	Lecce	Piacenza
CEST (UTC+2)				Stadium: Stadio Leonardo Garilli; Referee: Gianluca Paparesta

25 September 1999 4	Lecce	2–0	Juventus	Lecce
CEST (UTC+2)				Stadium: Stadio Via del mare Referee: Emilio Pellegrino

3 October 1999 5	Bologna	2–0	Lecce	Bologna
CEST (UTC+2)

17 October 1999 6	Lecce	2–1	Reggina	Lecce
CEST (UTC+2)				Stadium: Stadio Via del mare

24 October 1999 7	Lazio	4–2	Lecce	Rome
CEST (UTC+2)

31 October 1999 8	Lecce	0–1	Perugia	Lecce
CET (UTC+1)				Stadium: Stadio Via del mare

7 November 1999 9	Lecce	1–0	Udinese	Lecce
CET (UTC+1)				Stadium: Stadio Via del mare

21 November 1999 10	Internazionale	6–0	Lecce	Milan
CET (UTC+1)

28 November 1999 11	Lecce	2–1	Venezia	Lecce
CET (UTC+1)				Stadium: Stadio Via del mare

5 December 1999 12	Roma	3–2	Lecce	Rome
CET (UTC+1)

11 December 1999 13	Lecce	1–0	Bari	Lecce
CET (UTC+1)				Stadium: Stadio Via del mare

19 December 1999 14	Cagliari	0–0	Lecce	Cagliari
CET (UTC+1)

6 January 2000 15	Lecce	0–0	Fiorentina	Lecce
CET (UTC+1)				Stadium: Stadio Via del mare

9 January 2000 16	Torino	1–2	Lecce	Turin
CET (UTC+1)

16 January 2000 17	Lecce	0–0	Parma	Lecce
CET (UTC+1)				Stadium: Stadio Via del mare

23 January 2000 18	Milan	2–2	Lecce	Milan
CET (UTC+1)

29 January 2000 19	Lecce	2–1	Hellas Verona	Lecce
CET (UTC+1)				Stadium: Stadio Via del mare

6 February 2000 20	Lecce	0–1	Piacenza	Lecce
CET (UTC+1)				Stadium: Stadio Via del mare

13 February 2000 21	Juventus	1–0	Lecce	Milan
CET (UTC+1)

20 February 2000 22	Lecce	1–1	Bologna	Lecce
CET (UTC+1)				Stadium: Stadio Via del mare

27 February 2000 23	Reggina	2–1	Lecce	Reggio Calabria
CET (UTC+1)

5 March 2000 24	Lecce	0–1	Lazio	Lecce
CET (UTC+1)				Stadium: Stadio Via del mare

12 March 2000 25	Perugia	2–2	Lecce	Perugia
CET (UTC+1)

19 March 2000 26	Udinese	2–1	Lecce	Udine
CET (UTC+1)

25 March 2000 27	Lecce	1–0	Internazionale	Lecce
CET (UTC+1)				Stadium: Stadio Via del mare

2 April 2000 28	Venezia	0–0	Lecce	Venice
CEST (UTC+2)

9 April 2000 29	Lecce	0–0	Roma	Lecce
CEST (UTC+2)				Stadium: Stadio Via del mare

16 April 2000 30	Bari	3–1	Lecce	Bari
CEST (UTC+2)

22 April 2000 31	Lecce	2–1	Cagliari	Lecce
CEST (UTC+2)				Stadium: Stadio Via del mare

30 April 2000 32	Fiorentina	3–0	Lecce	Florence
CEST (UTC+2)

7 May 2000 33	Lecce	2–1	Torino	Lecce
CEST (UTC+2)				Stadium: Stadio Via del mare

14 May 2000 34	Parma	4–1	Lecce	Parma
CEST (UTC+2)

=== Coppa Italia ===
15 August 1999 1	Lucchese	0–1	Lecce	Lucca
CEST (UTC+2)			Sesa 90'	Stadium: Stadio Porta Elisa; Attendance: 2,500

18 August 1999 2	Lecce	1–1	Ternana	Lecce
CEST (UTC+2)	Bonomi 48'		Onorato 67'	Stadium: Stadio Via del mare Attendance: 8,715

22 August 1999 3	Lecce	3–0	Fidelis Andria	Lecce
CEST (UTC+2)	Sesa 57'; Piangerelli 60'; Paradiso 88'			Stadium: Stadio Via del mare

25 August 1999 4	Fidelis Andria	1–4	Lecce	Andria
CEST (UTC+2)	Del Prete 1'		Cimarelli 50'; Paradiso 54' (pen.); Greco 81'; Biliotti 90'	Stadium: Stadio Degli Ulivi

1 September 1999 5	Lecce	3–1	Lucchese	Lecce
CEST (UTC+2)	Lucarelli 37', 64'; Viali 73'			Stadium: Stadio Via del mare

15 September 1999 6	Ternana	2–0	Lecce	Terni
CEST (UTC+2)	Fabris 59'; Stellini 62'			Stadium: Stadio Libero Liberati
