= Angelo Paradiso =

Italian footballer (born 1977)

Personal information
- Date of birth: 14 February 1977 (age 49)
- Place of birth: Rome, Italy
- Height: 1.79 m (5 ft 10 in)
- Position: Midfielder

Youth career
- Lazio

Senior career*
Years	Team	Apps	(Gls)
1996–1998	Teramo	48	(7)
1998–1999	Napoli	29	(2)
1999–2000	Lecce	3	(0)
2000–2001	Cesena	18	(2)
2001	Ravenna	4	(0)
2001–2003	Lucchese	15	(0)
2003	Carrarese	12	(4)
2003–2004	Bellinzona	7	(0)
2004–2005	Pisa	10	(1)
2005	YF Juventus	0	(0)
2005–2006	Chieti	10	(0)
2006–2007	Birkirkara (Semi-pro)	?	(?)
2007–2008	Rieti (Amateur)	?	(?)
2009–2010	Ibiza-Eivissa (Amateur)	?	(?)
Total		156	(7)
- * Club domestic league appearances and goals

Angelo Paradiso (born 14 February 1977) is a former Italian professional footballer. Paradiso spent his career mainly at Serie C1 and Serie C2. He also played 3 Serie A matches.

== Biography ==
Paradiso started his professional career at Teramo. He played two season at Serie C2 before signed by Serie B side S.S.C. Napoli. In 1999, he joined Serie A side Lecce, but in mid-season joined Cesena of Serie B in a co-ownership deal. He followed Cesena relegated to Serie C1, but joined Ravenna of Serie B in mid-season. The team failed to avoid relegation and Paradiso joined Lucchese of Serie C1. After just played 15 league matches in 1 1/2 seasons, he joined league rival Carrarese but faced another relegation. In 2003-04 season, he joined Bellinzona of Italian speaking region of Switzerland. He played only 7 matches at Challenge League and moved to Pisa of Serie C1 then for Chieti. After the relegation of Chieti, he moved to Maltese club Birkirkara and played two matches at 2006–07 UEFA Champions League. He then returned to Italy for Serie D (non-professional, regional league or Italian 5th level).

In 2009, he joined Spanish side Ibiza-Eivissa of Tercera División. But the team later was expelled from the league due to late payment of wages. He followed the team to play at Regional de Ibiza y Formentera (Spanish fifth level).
