= Jacopo Ravasi =

Italian footballer (born 1987)

Personal information
- Date of birth: 8 February 1987 (age 39)
- Place of birth: Milan, Italy
- Height: 1.85 m (6 ft 1 in)
- Position: Forward

Youth career
- Monza
- 2003–2006: Internazionale

Senior career*
Years	Team	Apps	(Gls)
2006–2007	Pergocrema	7	(1)
2007–2008	Sestese	16	(4)
2008	Wil	15	(6)
2008–2009	Luzern	21	(3)
2009–2010	Sambonifacese	6	(0)
2010	→ Valenzana (loan)	18	(3)
2010–2011	Renate	27	(4)
- * Club domestic league appearances and goals

Jacopo Ravasi (born 8 February 1987) is an Italian footballer.

== Biography ==
Born in Milan, Lombardy, Ravasi joined F.C. Internazionale Milano in 2003 with number of Monza footballers. From 2004–05 to 2005–06 season he was the member of Berretti under-20 B team. He also played a few games for the spring the A team of U-20. However that team had Matteo Momentè and Domenico Germinale, made Ravasi had a limited chance. He was signed by Pergocrema in mid–2006. He left for Serie D club Sestese in mid-2007. In January 2008 he was signed by Swiss Challenge League club Wil. His goal scoring record made Luzern signed him at the start of 2008–09 Swiss Super League.

In mid-2009 he returned to Italy for Lega Pro Seconda Divisione (Italian fourth division) club Sambonifacese. In January 2010 he was loaned to Valenzana after the signing of Dimas. In mid-2010 he was signed by Renate. He retired in 2020.
