= Daniele Conti =

Italian footballer and manager (born 1979)

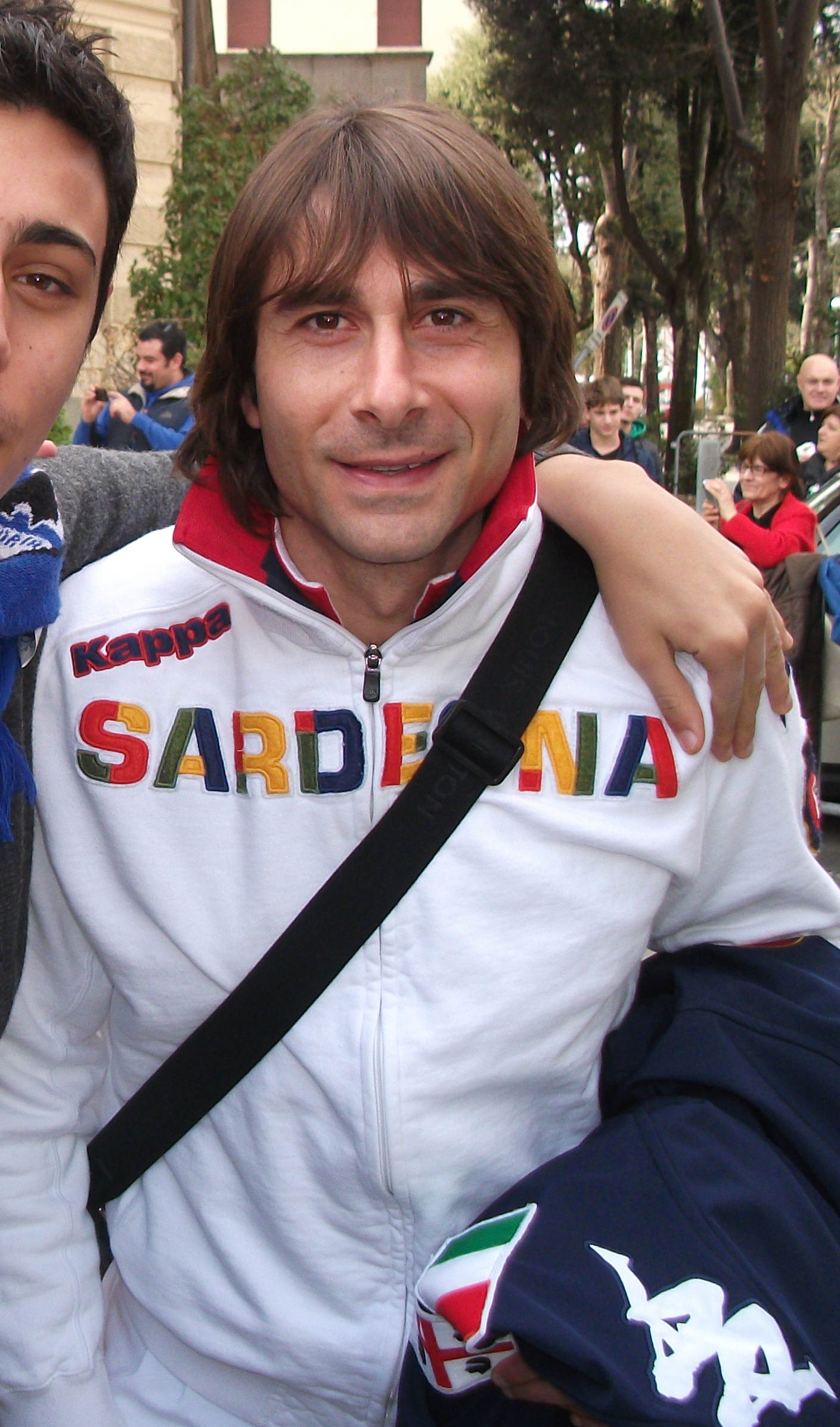
- Conti in 2012

Personal information
- Date of birth: 9 January 1979 (age 47)
- Place of birth: Nettuno, Italy
- Height: 1.78 m (5 ft 10 in)
- Position: Midfielder

Youth career
- Roma

Senior career*
Years	Team	Apps	(Gls)
1996–1999	Roma	5	(1)
1999–2015	Cagliari	434	(47)
Total		439	(48)

International career
1998–1999	Italy U21	1	(0)
- * Club domestic league appearances and goals

Daniele Conti (born 9 January 1979) is an Italian football manager and former player, who played most of his career for Cagliari as a midfielder. He is the son of former AS Roma and Italy star Bruno Conti, and the younger brother of fellow footballer Andrea Conti.

== Club career ==
Conti started his career at his father's club Roma, debuting in 1996. In 1999, he was sold to Cagliari in a co-ownership deal for 800 million lire (€413,166). He did not leave the club despite the club being relegated in 2000. In June 2000 Cagliari signed him outright for another 1.25 billion lire (€645,571).

In June 2004, he was in the team when they were the runner-up of Serie B and returned to Serie A after four seasons. Conti became the new team captain after the retirement of long-serving Uruguayan defender Diego López in 2010.

In January 2013 Conti extended his contract for one more year. On 10 November 2013, he scored a brace against Torino. His father Bruno wrote an open letter which was published on the local newspaper L'Unione Sarda several days later, congratulating him on a stellar career – earlier that year Daniele became the club's all-time appearance maker, breaking local legend Mario Brugnera's three decade-old record. He retired at the end of the 2014–15 season, after sixteen years with the club. In total, he made 464 appearances for Cagliari, scoring 51 goals.

== International career ==
Conti played once for the Italy U21 team, on 16 August 2000, in a 2–0 friendly win over the Mexico U23 side.

== Style of play and discipline ==
Conti began his career as an attacking midfielder, but later established himself as a well-rounded central or defensive midfielder, who could operate as a deep-lying playmaker, with his ability to dictate play in midfield and build attacks with his passing, or provide defensive cover for his team. Possessing good technique, vision, and offensive qualities, he was known for his ability to cause problems for opponents with his late runs off the ball from deep, despite his lack of pace, which made him a threat on crosses and set-pieces. He was also known for his ability to score goals from direct free-kicks. Beyond his playing ability, he was also known for his leadership and loyalty to Cagliari.

However, Conti was also known for his lack of discipline, aggression, and tenacity on the pitch, and his resulting tendency to commit fouls and pick-up many cards throughout his playing career. With eleven red cards and 146 yellow cards in 338 Serie A appearances, he has the joint-sixth highest number of sending offs in Serie A history, and the second-most bookings in the league's history after Giampiero Pinzi. He also holds the record for most yellow cards in a single Serie A season (16, during the 2012–13 Serie A season).

== Managerial career ==
In July 2016, Cagliari signed Conti as a co-ordinator for the club's youth system. He resigned from his role in July 2022, leaving the club after 23 consecutive years as both a player and a staff member.

== Personal life ==
Conti is married to long-time girlfriend Valeria and they have two sons, Bruno (named after his grandfather) and Manuel.
