= Nelson Abeijón =

Uruguayan footballer (born 1973)

Personal information
- Full name: Nelson Javier Abeijón Pessi
- Date of birth: 21 July 1973 (age 53)
- Place of birth: Montevideo, Uruguay
- Height: 1.84 m (6 ft 1/2 in)
- Position: Midfielder

Youth career
- Nacional

Senior career*
Years	Team	Apps	(Gls)
1994–1997	Nacional	81	(9)
1997–1998	Racing Santander	30	(2)
1998–2006	Cagliari	154	(11)
2003–2004	→ Como (loan)	10	(1)
2006–2007	Atalanta	5	(0)
2008	River Plate Montevideo	2	(0)

International career
1994–2003	Uruguay	23	(2)

Managerial career
- 2016: Oriental
- 2016–2017: Deportivo Maldonado
- 2018: Cerro (assistant)
- 2022–2023: Nacional (reserves)
- 2023–2024: Nacional (assistant)
- 2026: Cerro
Medal record
Representing Uruguay
Copa América
Winner	1995 Uruguay
- * Club domestic league appearances and goals

Nelson Javier Abeijón Pessi (born 21 July 1973) is a Uruguayan football manager and former player who played as a midfielder.

Abeijón is nicknamed Abe or Abeja, due to his last name similarity with the word abeja (Spanish for bee).

== Playing career ==
=== Club ===
He started his career in 1994 with Nacional (winning one minor title championship). His role as a holding midfield player and his tough approach of the game made him very popular among his fans. He eventually left the team in the season 1997-1998 when he played in Spain La Liga with Racing de Santander. In August 1998 Abeijón moved to Italian Serie A and then Serie B with Cagliari and Como. In the summer of 2006 he was transferred to Atalanta. During his career he played 282 matches and scored 23 goals.

Abeijón left for Como in 2003 but in January 2004 returned to Cagliari. in July he signed a 2-year contract.

=== International ===
Abeijón made his debut for the Uruguay national football team on October 19, 1994, in a friendly match against Peru (0–1 win) in the Estadio Nacional José Díaz in Lima, Peru. He earned a total number of 23 caps for his native country, scoring two goals.
