= Andrea Capone =

Italian footballer (1981–2024)

Personal information
- Date of birth: 8 January 1981
- Place of birth: Cagliari, Italy
- Date of death: 29 September 2024 (aged 43)
- Place of death: Cagliari, Italy
- Height: 1.81 m (5 ft 11 in)
- Position: Midfielder

Youth career
- 1998–2000: Cagliari

Senior career*
Years	Team	Apps	(Gls)
2000–2007	Cagliari	113	(12)
2001–2002	→ Sora (loan)	11	(1)
2004–2005	→ Treviso (loan)	28	(3)
2007–2009	Vicenza	42	(8)
2009	→ Grosseto (loan)	9	(1)
2010	Salernitana	0	(0)
Total		203	(25)
- * Club domestic league appearances and goals

Andrea Capone (8 January 1981 – 29 September 2024) was an Italian professional footballer who played as a midfielder, spending most of his career with Cagliari.

== Career ==
After developing in the Cagliari youth system, he made his first team debut during the 2000–01 Serie B season, making 12 appearances and scoring a goal. The following season, he moved to Serie C1 side Sora on loan, with little success. He returned to Cagliari, spending three more seasons with the club, before being loaned to Treviso for the 2004–05 Serie B season, scoring 3 goals in 29 appearances, and helping the club to achieve Serie A promotion.

He returned once again to Cagliari, making his Serie A debut with the club on 28 August 2005, in an away fixture against Siena, remaining with the squad for two more seasons. He wore the number 10 shirt during this time at Cagliari. This is significant as two years earlier it had been Gianfranco Zola's number, and had been retired the previous season.

At the end of the 2006–07 Serie A season, on 12 July 2007, it was announced that Capone had been granted a trial with Scottish outfit Celtic. He featured in a friendly 2–1 win over Peterborough United setting up a goal. Two days later he got his name on the score sheet against Queen's Park Rangers of the Football League Championship in another friendly as part of a 5–1 win.

In August 2007, he joined Vicenza, scoring 8 goals in 42 appearances.

In January 2009, he swapped clubs with Duccio Innocenti, moving to Grosseto.

After four months without a club, on 29 October 2009, he signed a contract with Salernitana, effective from 2 January 2010. The side went bankrupt during the summer of 2011, making him once again a free-agent.

== Death ==
On the morning of 29 September 2024, Capone was found dead in a hotel in Cagliari, where he spent the night after a party. He was 43, and the cause of death is suspected to be an accidental fall.
