= Francesco Bega =

Italian footballer

Personal information
- Date of birth: 26 October 1974 (age 52)
- Place of birth: Milan, Italy
- Height: 1.74 m (5 ft 9 in)
- Position: Centre back

Youth career
- 1989–1990: Monza

Senior career*
Years	Team	Apps	(Gls)
1993–1997	Monza	67	(1)
1997–1998	Cosenza	26	(0)
1998–1999	Alzano Virescit	10	(0)
1998–1999	Atletico Catania	9	(0)
1999–2000	Alzano Virescit	34	(0)
2000–2002	Como	51	(0)
2002–2004	Triestina	66	(0)
2004–2006	Cagliari	61	(1)
2006–2008	Genoa	42	(0)
2008–2011	Brescia	55	(4)
2011–2012	Lugano	21	(1)
- * Club domestic league appearances and goals as of November 2012

Francesco Bega (born 26 October 1974, in Milan) is a retired Italian footballer who played as a defender. He currently works as team manager for his former team Genoa.
