= Mauro Esposito =

Italian footballer (born 1979)

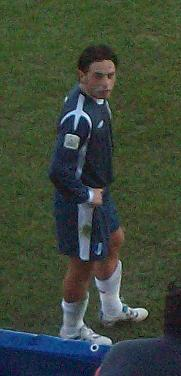

Personal information
- Full name: Mauro Esposito
- Date of birth: 13 June 1979 (age 47)
- Place of birth: Torre del Greco, Italy
- Height: 1.72 m (5 ft 8 in)
- Position: Winger

Youth career
- 1985–1997: Pescara

Senior career*
Years	Team	Apps	(Gls)
1997–1999	Pescara	47	(12)
1999–2001	Udinese	9	(0)
2001	→ Pescara (loan)	18	(4)
2001–2007	Cagliari	198	(58)
2007–2010	Roma	8	(0)
2008–2009	→ Chievo (loan)	27	(0)
2010	→ Grosseto (loan)	18	(4)
2010–2011	Atletico Roma	19	(5)
Total		344	(83)

International career
2004–2006	Italy	6	(0)
- * Club domestic league appearances and goals

Mauro Esposito (Italian pronunciation: [ˈmauro eˈspɔːzito]; born 13 June 1979) is an Italian former professional footballer who played mainly as a right winger.

== Club career ==
Born in Torre del Greco, Campania, Esposito made his professional debut in 1997 with Pescara Calcio after having a trial with English club Everton. He went on to play in two Serie B campaigns with the team. After an unsuccessful trial with Rangers, he joined Udinese Calcio, with which he first appeared in Serie A, playing just nine league games in two years and also being loaned to his previous club.

In 2001–02, Esposito moved to Cagliari Calcio in the second division, being an undisputed starter during his spell with the Sardinians and scoring in double digits in three of his six seasons – in 2003–04, he netted a career-best 17 goals in 40 matches, with his team finishing in second position and returning to the top flight after a five-year absence.

After his scoring partner David Suazo's confirmed departure, on 4 July 2007, AS Roma acquired 50% of Esposito's rights for €2 million, plus the free loan of Daniele Magliocchetti. He signed a three-year contract, with a gross annual salary of €1.4 million.

In June 2008, Esposito was purchased definitively by Roma for €350,000, and Magliocchetti was sold in a co-ownership deal for a nominal fee of €484. During his two seasons with the side, he was very rarely used, with all of his league appearances coming in 2007–08; on 1 September 2008, he was sent on loan to AC ChievoVerona of Serie B, with the Veneto club having the option to sign him permanently for €2.5M (plus VAT) at the end of the season.

On 1 February 2010, Esposito moved, in the same predicament, to US Grosseto FC, also in the second level. His contract with Roma expired on 30 June and, in September, he signed with Atletico Roma FC of the Lega Pro Prima Divisione.

In the 2011 summer, his club was dissolved, and Esposito retired, aged 32.

== International career ==
On 9 October 2004, Esposito made his debut for Italy, in a 2006 FIFA World Cup qualifier against Slovenia, starting in the 0–1 loss in Celje. He would be later called by coach Marcello Lippi for the pre-World Cup stage held on 2/3 May, but did not make the final cut.

On 16 August 2006, Esposito was picked by new manager Roberto Donadoni for a friendly with Croatia, starting in a 0–2 home defeat. It would be his last appearance for the national team.

== Honours ==
Udinese

- UEFA Intertoto Cup: 2000
