= Antonio Langella =

Italian footballer (born 1977)

Personal information
- Date of birth: 30 March 1977 (age 49)
- Place of birth: Naples, Italy
- Height: 1.82 m (6 ft 0 in)
- Positions: Forward; winger

Youth career
- Sorso

Senior career*
Years	Team	Apps	(Gls)
1993–1994	Sorso	0	(0)
1994–1999	Castelsardo	114	(18)
1999–2002	Sassari Torres	77	(20)
2002–2007	Cagliari	136	(20)
2007–2008	Atalanta	27	(8)
2008–2009	Udinese	0	(0)
2008–2009	→ Chievo (loan)	22	(2)
2009–2011	Bari	9	(0)

International career^{‡}
2005	Italy	3	(0)
- * Club domestic league appearances and goals as of 16 January 2010 ‡ National team caps and goals as of 06:49, 6 October 2007 (UTC)

Antonio Langella (Italian pronunciation: [anˈtɔːnjo lanˈdʒɛlla]; born 30 March 1977) is an Italian footballer who played as a forward or winger on either flank.

== Club career ==
After playing for a number of lower-rank Sardinian clubs in the beginning of his career, Langella joined Cagliari Calcio in March 2002, then in Serie B. With this team, he made his Serie A debut on 12 September 2004, against Bologna. In December 2004, his contract with Cagliari was renewed until 2008. However, he made just 16 goalless appearances in 2006–07, subsequently moving to Atalanta on 10 July 2007.

In 2008, he joined Udinese on reported free transfer, being however immediately loaned out to Chievo, where he failed to impress throughout the season. During the 2009 summer transfer window, he left Udinese to join newly promoted Serie A outfit Bari in 3-year deal. He only played 9 Serie A games in the first season. In the next two seasons, he was left out of the first team by coach Gian Piero Ventura, and failed to make any appearances. In September 2011, he terminated his contract with Bari, and subsequently retired from professional football.

== International career ==
Langella made all three appearances in the Italy national team, under Marcello Lippi, in 2005. He made his senior international debut on 9 February, in a 2–0 friendly home win over Russia, and later appeared in a 0–0 friendly home draw against Iceland on 30 March, and in a 1–1 friendly draw against Ecuador, in New York on 11 June, which was his final appearance for Italy.

== Career statistics ==
=== International ===
As of 11 June 2005

Italy national team
Year	Apps	Goals
2005	3	0
Total	3	0

== Honours ==
=== Club ===
- Sassari Torres:

- Serie D: 1999–00
