= David Suazo =

Honduran footballer (born 1979)

Personal information
- Full name: Óscar David Suazo Velázquez
- Date of birth: 5 November 1979 (age 47)
- Place of birth: San Pedro Sula, Honduras
- Height: 1.80 m (5 ft 11 in)
- Position: Striker

Youth career
- –1997: Marathón

Senior career*
Years	Team	Apps	(Gls)
1997–1999	Olimpia	10	(5)
1999–2007	Cagliari	255	(94)
2007–2011	Inter Milan	27	(8)
2008–2009	→ Benfica (loan)	12	(4)
2010–2011	→ Genoa (loan)	16	(3)
2011–2012	Catania	6	(0)
Total		327	(114)

International career
2000	Honduras U23	5	(6)
1999–2012	Honduras	57	(17)

Managerial career
- 2018: Brescia
- 2021–2022: Carbonia
- * Club domestic league appearances and goals

Óscar David Suazo Velázquez (born 5 November 1979), nicknamed "La Pantera" or "El Rey David", is a Honduran retired professional footballer turned coach who played as a striker. Suazo played more than 300 league games and scored over 90 league goals in Italy during a span of 12 seasons.

== Club career ==
=== Early career ===
Nicknamed La Pantera (The Panther) or El Rey David (The King David), Suazo was born in San Pedro Sula. In his early career, he developed alongside his cousin, Maynor Suazo, who also went on to play for the Honduras national team. Suazo took his first steps at Olimpia Reserves and later went on to play at the Liga Bancaria. After his participation in 1999 FIFA World Youth Championship, he was acquired by domestic club team Olimpia. He continued to impress playing for Olimpia's youth system under the coaching of the late Angel Ramón Paz ("Mon Paz") and earned a spot on the top squad before turning 20 years old.

=== Cagliari ===
Óscar Tabárez, then-coach of Italian side Cagliari, was impressed by Suazo's performance and did not hesitate in bringing him to Europe, for US$2 million transfer fee and US$200,000 tax to National Autonomous Federation of Football of Honduras, as well as 15–20% of the future capital gain if Cagliari sold the player above the US$2.2 million price tag. Suazo officially joined the club ahead of the 1999–2000 Serie A season. In his first year with the team, he scored one goal in 13 league appearances, and at the end of the 1999–2000 season, Cagliari were relegated to Serie B where they would remain until the 2003–04 season

=== Inter Milan ===
On 13 June 2007, reports arose that Suazo had agreed terms with Serie A champions Inter Milan. Six days later, however, crosstown rivals and reigning European champions Milan announced that they themselves had acquired Suazo. While Milan claimed they had successfully negotiated with Cagliari, the deal with Inter was confirmed by Cagliari chairman Massimo Cellino. Meanwhile, one of Suazo's agents, Carlo Pallavicino, added to the confusion by saying, "Suazo has not had any contact with Milan and he still has not given his consent to the transfer." It was later announced that Suazo was confirmed with Inter on 26 June for €14 million fee (with about US$2.5 million was required to pay by Cagliari to Olimpia) after Milan officially withdrew their contract offer. Since Suazo himself wanted to keep his initial agreement with Inter. "It was an issue of respect. The Rossoneri (nickname of Milan) understood that I had a promise with coach Roberto Mancini, Marco Branca and chairman Massimo Moratti." He scored his first Inter goal against Genoa and scored a total of eight goals throughout his first season with the Nerazzurri (the nickname of Inter).

=== Loans ===
After a less-than-impressive first season with Inter, Suazo was loaned to Portuguese club Benfica for the 2008–09 season. Suazo however, appeared in just 12 league matches and scored just four goals during the season. Following his return to Inter in June 2009, he was given limited squad space and failed to make any starts for his club. On 29 December 2009, it was confirmed that Suazo had been authorized to play friendly match for Genoa, two days before the opening of the winter transfer window. After the opening of the transfer window, Suazo officially joined Genoa on a six-month loan deal, where he replaced Sergio Floccari, who was transferred to Lazio on 4 January. This was part of a deal that completed a three-way, three-man swap in which Inter also received Goran Pandev from Lazio on free transfer. Suazo made his debut for Genoa against Milan in a losing effort, appearing on the scoresheet in the process. He scored the second goal for Genoa and was eventually substituted in the 80th minute for Hernán Crespo. His loan with Genoa proved to be highly unsuccessful, as the player scored a mere 2 goals in 16 Serie A appearances.

=== Return to Inter ===
After his Genoa loan expired, Suazo returned to Inter but, in part because of a long-term injury, he was not included in the first-team, thus failing to make a single appearance in the entire 2010–11 season. Suazo's contract with Inter expired on 30 June 2011, leaving the player without a contract. Since then, he was linked with a comeback at Cagliari following a trial period. This was a possibility that was later confirmed by club chairman Massimo Cellino, who, on 13 July 2011, confirmed Suazo's return to Sardinia by the end of the transfer window, and defined his signing as "a cherry on the pie". The transfer, however, collapsed after Suazo was asked to leave Cagliari's pre-season camp after Cellino opted against the move and changed his decision about the transfer.

=== Catania ===
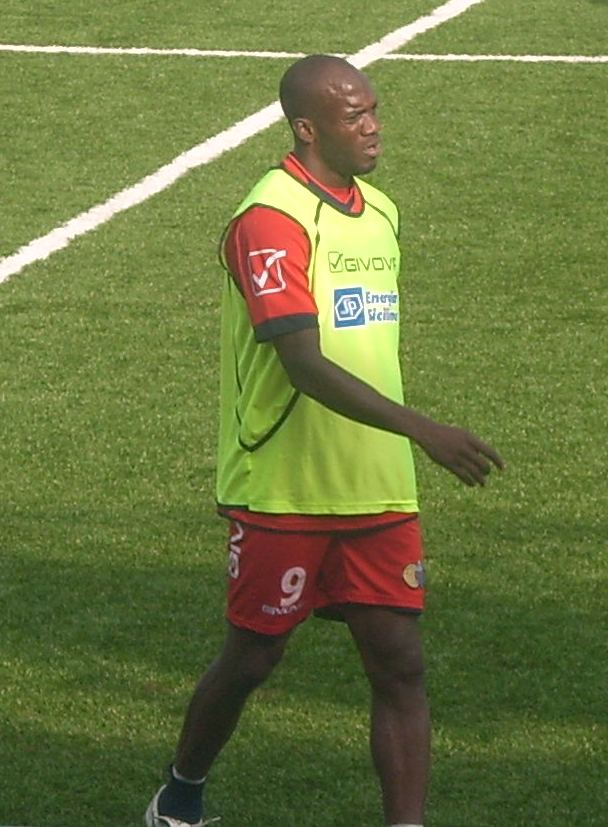
Suazo training for Catania in 2011

On 12 August 2011, Suazo signed for Catania on a one-year deal. He was officially presented on the same day alongside new arrivals Mario Paglialunga and Davide Lanzafame. Suazo was assigned the number 9 jersey, though only would make six appearances during his time in Sicily, which ended upon the expiration of his contract on 30 June 2012. On 27 March 2013, at the age of 33, he announced his retirement from football, due to his persisting struggles with knee injuries.

== International career ==
Suazo played for the Honduras national under-20 football team at the 1999 FIFA World Youth Championship. He made his senior debut for Honduras in a May 1999 friendly match against Haiti and has earned a total of 57 caps, scoring 17 goals. He has represented his country in 30 FIFA World Cup qualification matches and at the 2010 FIFA World Cup. He also played at the 2000 Summer Olympics and at the 2003 UNCAF Nations Cup as well as at the 2003 CONCACAF Gold Cup. He also played a few minutes of Honduras' first match at the 2001 Copa América. His final international appearance came on 12 June 2012, in a 2014 FIFA World Cup qualifying match against Canada.

== Post-playing and coaching career ==
Following his retirement as a player, Suazo was hired by his former team Cagliari as a scout. In 2014, he joined the first team coaching staff as an assistant to Ivo Pulga for the final part of the season; he successively was appointed to the same role by the end of the 2014–15 season, supporting new head coach Gianluca Festa. For the 2015–16 season, he was named new youth team coach for the Giovanissimi Nazionali. On 5 June 2018, he was appointed manager of Serie B side Brescia by Massimo Cellino, former chairman of his while at Cagliari. He was however sacked on 18 September 2018 after a negative start to the new season. On 13 May 2021, Suazo returned into management as the new head coach of struggling Sardinian Serie D side Carbonia. After guiding Carbonia to safety, on 31 July 2021 he agreed a two-year contract extension with the club. On 24 June 2022, Carbonia and Suazo parted ways, following the team's relegation to Eccellenza at the end of the 2021–22 Serie D season.

== Style of play ==
A quick and strong striker, Suazo is considered to be one of the most notable players Honduras has ever produced. His main characteristic as a forward was his speed which made him one of the fastest Serie A players of his time. His pace and acceleration allowed him to create space on the offensive and provide depth to his team with his runs from behind. In spite of his ability, however, he was often injury prone throughout his career. He served as Cagliari's captain. Suazo also took several penalties and scores from free kicks.

== Personal life ==
David's brothers are Nicolás Suazo, Ivan Suazo, and Ruben Suazo. Former internationals Maynor Suazo and Hendry Thomas are his cousins. He holds Italian nationality by virtue of his 2005 marriage to an Italian woman, Elisa Secchi. They have two sons, David Edoardo (born in 2005) and Luis Gabriel (born in 2008). Both followed on their father's footsteps: David Edoardo is a player for Serie C club Team Altamura. after having made his senior debut in 2025 with minor Sardinian club Monastir as a prolific striker, whereas Luis joined Juventus's Under-15 team in 2022, and later in 2025 the Portuguese club Braga, being successively named by English newspaper The Guardian as one of the best players born in 2008 worldwide.

== Career statistics ==
=== Club ===
Appearances and goals by club, season and competition
Club	Season	League			Cup (Note: Includes Honduran Cup, Coppa Italia.)		Continental		Total	
Club	Season	Division	Apps	Goals	Apps	Goals	Apps	Goals	Apps	Goals
Olimpia	1997–98	Liga Nacional	0	0	–		–		0	0
Olimpia	1998–99	Liga Nacional	10	5	–		–		10	5
Olimpia	Total		10	5	–		–		10	5
Cagliari	1999–2000	Serie A	13	1	3	0	–		16	1
Cagliari	2000–01	Serie B	33	12	3	2	–		36	14
Cagliari	2001–02	Serie B	34	9	–		–		34	9
Cagliari	2002–03	Serie B	35	10	3	1	–		38	11
Cagliari	2003–04	Serie B	45	19	1	0	–		46	19
Cagliari	2004–05	Serie A	22	7	3	1	–		25	8
Cagliari	2005–06	Serie A	37	22	5	3	–		42	25
Cagliari	2006–07	Serie A	36	14	3	1	–		39	15
Cagliari	Total		255	94	21	8	0	0	276	102
Inter Milan	2007–08	Serie A	26	8	3	0	6	2	35	10
Inter Milan	2009–10	Serie A	1	0	2	0	1	0	4	0
Inter Milan	2010–11	Serie A	0	0	0	0	0	0	0	0
Inter Milan	Total		27	8	5	0	7	2	39	10
Benfica (loan)	2008–09	Portuguese Liga	12	4	–		4	1	16	5
Genoa (loan)	2009–10	Serie A	16	3	–		–		16	3
Catania	2011–12	Serie A	6	0	0	0	0	0	6	0
Career total			314	114	24	8	10	1	348	123

=== International ===
Scores and results list Honduras' goal tally first, score column indicates score after each Suazo goal.

List of international goals scored by David Suazo
No.	Date	Venue	Opponent	Score	Result	Competition
1	16 July 2000	Estadio Cuscatlán, San Salvador, El Salvador	El Salvador	5–0	5–2	2002 FIFA World Cup qualification
2	2 September 2000	Estadio Olímpico Metropolitano, San Pedro Sula, Honduras	El Salvador	4–0	5–0	2002 FIFA World Cup qualifiers
3	12 June 2004	Stadion Ergilio Hato, Willemstad, Netherlands Antilles	Netherlands Antilles	1–0	2–1	2006 FIFA World Cup qualification
4	12 June 2004	Stadion Ergilio Hato, Willemstad, Netherlands Antilles	Netherlands Antilles	2–0	2–1	2006 FIFA World Cup qualification
5	19 June 2004	Estadio Olímpico Metropolitano, San Pedro Sula, Honduras	Netherlands Antilles	2–0	4–0	2006 FIFA World Cup qualification
6	18 August 2004	Estadio Alejandro Morera Soto, Alajuela, Costa Rica	Costa Rica	1–1	5–2	2006 FIFA World Cup qualification
7	8 September 2004	Estadio Olímpico Metropolitano, San Pedro Sula, Honduras	Guatemala	2–2	2–2	2006 FIFA World Cup qualification
8	7 October 2006	Lockhart Stadium, Fort Lauderdale, United States	Guatemala	3–2	3–2	Friendly
9	12 September 2007	Estadio Olímpico Metropolitano, San Pedro Sula, Honduras	Ecuador	1–0	2–1	Friendly
10	26 March 2008	Lockhart Stadium, Fort Lauderdale, United States	Colombia	1–0	2–1	Friendly
11	4 June 2008	Estadio Olímpico Metropolitano, San Pedro Sula, Honduras	Puerto Rico	3–0	4–0	2010 FIFA World Cup qualification
12	4 June 2008	Estadio Olímpico Metropolitano, San Pedro Sula, Honduras	Puerto Rico	4–0	4–0	2010 FIFA World Cup qualification
13	7 June 2008	Estadio Nilmo Edwards, La Ceiba, Honduras	Haiti	2–0	3–1	Friendly
14	14 June 2008	Estadio Juan Ramon Loubriel, Bayamón, Puerto Rico	Puerto Rico	1–0	2–2	2010 FIFA World Cup qualification
15	5 September 2009	Estadio Olímpico Metropolitano, San Pedro Sula, Honduras	Trinidad and Tobago	4–0	4–1	2010 FIFA World Cup qualification
16	18 November 2009	Land Shark Stadium, Miami Gardens, United States	Peru	1–1	1–2	Friendly
17	11 April 2012	Estadio Nacional de Costa Rica, San José, Costa Rica	Costa Rica	1–0	1–1	Friendly

== Honours ==
Olimpia

- Honduran Liga Nacional: 1998–99
- Honduran Super Copa: 1996–97
- Honduran Cup: 1998

Cagliari

- Serie B runner-up: 2003–04

Inter Milan

- Serie A: 2007–08, 2009–10
- Supercoppa Italiana: 2010
- Coppa Italia: 2009–10
- UEFA Champions League: 2009–10
- FIFA Club World Cup: 2010,

Benfica

- Taça da Liga: 2008–09

Honduras

- CONCACAF Men's Olympic Qualifying Tournament: 2000

Individual

- Serie A Foreign Footballer of the Year: 2006
