= Diego López (footballer, born August 1974) =

Uruguayan footballer and manager

Personal information
- Full name: Luis Diego López Breijo
- Date of birth: 22 August 1974 (age 52)
- Place of birth: Montevideo, Uruguay
- Height: 1.80 m (5 ft 11 in)
- Position: Defender

Senior career*
Years	Team	Apps	(Gls)
1994–1996	River Plate Montevideo	37	(2)
1996–1998	Racing Santander	62	(3)
1998–2010	Cagliari	314	(7)
Total		413	(12)

International career
1994–2005	Uruguay	39	(0)

Managerial career
- 2012–2013: Cagliari (assistant)
- 2013–2014: Cagliari
- 2014–2015: Bologna
- 2017: Palermo
- 2017–2018: Cagliari
- 2018–2019: Peñarol
- 2020: Brescia
- 2020: Brescia
- 2022: Universidad de Chile
- 2023–2024: Barcelona SC
- 2025: River Plate Montevideo
Medal record
Representing Uruguay
Copa América
Winner	1995 Uruguay
Runner-up	1999 Paraguay
- * Club domestic league appearances and goals

Luis Diego López Breijo (Latin American Spanish: [lwisˈðjeɣo ˈlopes]; (Note: In isolation, Diego is pronounced [ˈdjeɣo].) born 22 August 1974) is a Uruguayan football manager and former player who played as a defender. He was recently the manager of River Plate Montevideo.

His career was intimately connected with Cagliari in Italy, for which he appeared in over 300 competitive games in 12 years, playing as a defender. Internationally, he represented Uruguay in two Copa América tournaments.

López served as Cagliari's manager in two spells, as well as three other Serie A clubs. In 2018, he won the Uruguayan Primera División for Peñarol.

== Playing career ==
=== Club ===
Born in Montevideo, López started playing professionally with local Club Atlético River Plate. Two years later, he signed with Racing Santander in Spain, playing 39 La Liga games in his debut season but receiving nine yellow cards and three red in the process; in Cantabria, he shared teams with compatriots Fernando Correa and José Zalazar.

López moved to Italy in 1998 and joined Cagliari, recently promoted to Serie A. During his first seven seasons in Sardinia, with the exception of his first year – only one match – he never made less than 26 league appearances and spent four years (2000–04) in the second division, also being eventually awarded team captaincy.

On 14 April 2009, following a tunnel brawl with Fiorentina's Felipe Melo in a 2–1 away loss, both López and the Brazilian received a five-match ban. In July, one month shy of his 35th birthday, he signed a one-year contract with Cagliari. In the 2009–10 campaign the veteran contributed 18 games as his team again managed to avoid relegation, after finishing in 16th position.

On 9 September 2010, after not being called up to Cagliari's 2010–11 pre-season camp, López announced his retirement from professional football, having appeared in 344 official matches for his main club.

=== International ===
López made his debut for Uruguay on 19 October 1994, in a friendly match with Peru at the Estadio Nacional José Díaz in Lima (1–0 win). The following year, he represented the nation at the Copa América, with the tournament being held on home soil and won by the hosts, who conceded just four goals in six matches.

López was overlooked, however, for the squads which appeared at the 2002 and 2010 FIFA World Cups, and earned a total of 32 caps.

== Coaching career ==
In July 2012, López was named at the helm of the Primavera under-19 side of Cagliari and, on 2 October, was unveiled as new assistant coach for the main squad after the Ivo Pulga-led club parted ways with Massimo Ficcadenti. López and Pulga swapped roles in July 2013 after the former was admitted to the yearly UEFA Pro Licence course, thus being allowed to serve as head coach in the Italian top flight; he was dismissed on 6 April 2014 by owner Massimo Cellino, this being the 36th manager change he went through in 22 years of tenure.

On 1 July 2014, López was appointed at Bologna in the Italian second tier. After a good start to the season, he was relieved of his duties on 4 May 2015 following a negative streak.

López was named Palermo's fourth manager of the campaign, on 26 January 2017. He was sacked on 11 April, after a run of bad results.

On 18 October 2017, López returned to Cagliari as head coach after the dismissal of Massimo Rastelli. At the end of the season, having avoided the drop, he left by mutual consent.

López returned to his homeland in early June 2018, joining Peñarol. Starting from five points behind arch-rivals Nacional, he led the club to a league title by beating that adversary 1–0 in the final; after losing by the same margin to Nacional in the next edition, he announced his exit in December 2019.

On 5 February 2020, López returned to the Italian top division, signing with second-from-bottom Brescia following Eugenio Corini's sacking. His contract with the club – also owned by Cellino – was terminated by mutual consent on 12 August following relegation, and Luigi Delneri succeeded him. On 6 October, however, he returned to the Stadio Mario Rigamonti. He was shown the door again on 7 December, after a run of three defeats.

== Personal life ==
He has three sons called Thiago, Ian and Inty. They were born in Italy and have been with the Cagliari youth team. The oldest son, Thiago, also played for Peñarol.

== Managerial statistics ==
As of match played 29 March 2025

Managerial record by team and tenure
Team	Nat	From	To	Record							
Team	Nat	From	To	G	W	D	L	GF	GA	GD	Win %
Cagliari	(Italy)	1 July 2013	7 April 2014	33	7	11	15	31	46	−15	21.21
Bologna	(Italy)	1 July 2014	4 May 2015	40	16	15	9	47	35	+12	40.00
Palermo	(Italy)	26 January 2017	11 April 2017	10	1	2	7	8	26	−18	10.00
Cagliari	(Italy)	18 October 2017	7 June 2018	31	9	6	16	28	49	−21	29.03
Peñarol	(Uruguay)	8 June 2018	17 December 2019	67	36	17	14	98	60	+38	53.73
Brescia	(Italy)	5 February 2020	20 August 2020	16	2	4	10	15	38	−23	12.50
Brescia	(Italy)	6 October 2020	7 December 2020	9	3	2	4	14	13	+1	33.33
Universidad de Chile	(Chile)	31 May 2022	9 September 2022	13	3	5	5	12	18	−6	23.08
Barcelona SC	(Ecuador)	12 July 2023	19 April 2024	24	13	9	2	39	22	+17	54.17
River Plate Montevideo	(Uruguay)	30 December 2024	30 March 2025	9	0	3	6	8	15	−7	0.00
Total				252	90	74	88	300	322	−22	35.71

== Honours ==
=== Player ===
Uruguay

- Copa América: 1995; Runner-up 1999

=== Manager ===
Peñarol

- Uruguayan Primera División: 2018
