= 2009–10 Inter Milan season =

Inter Milan
2009–10 season
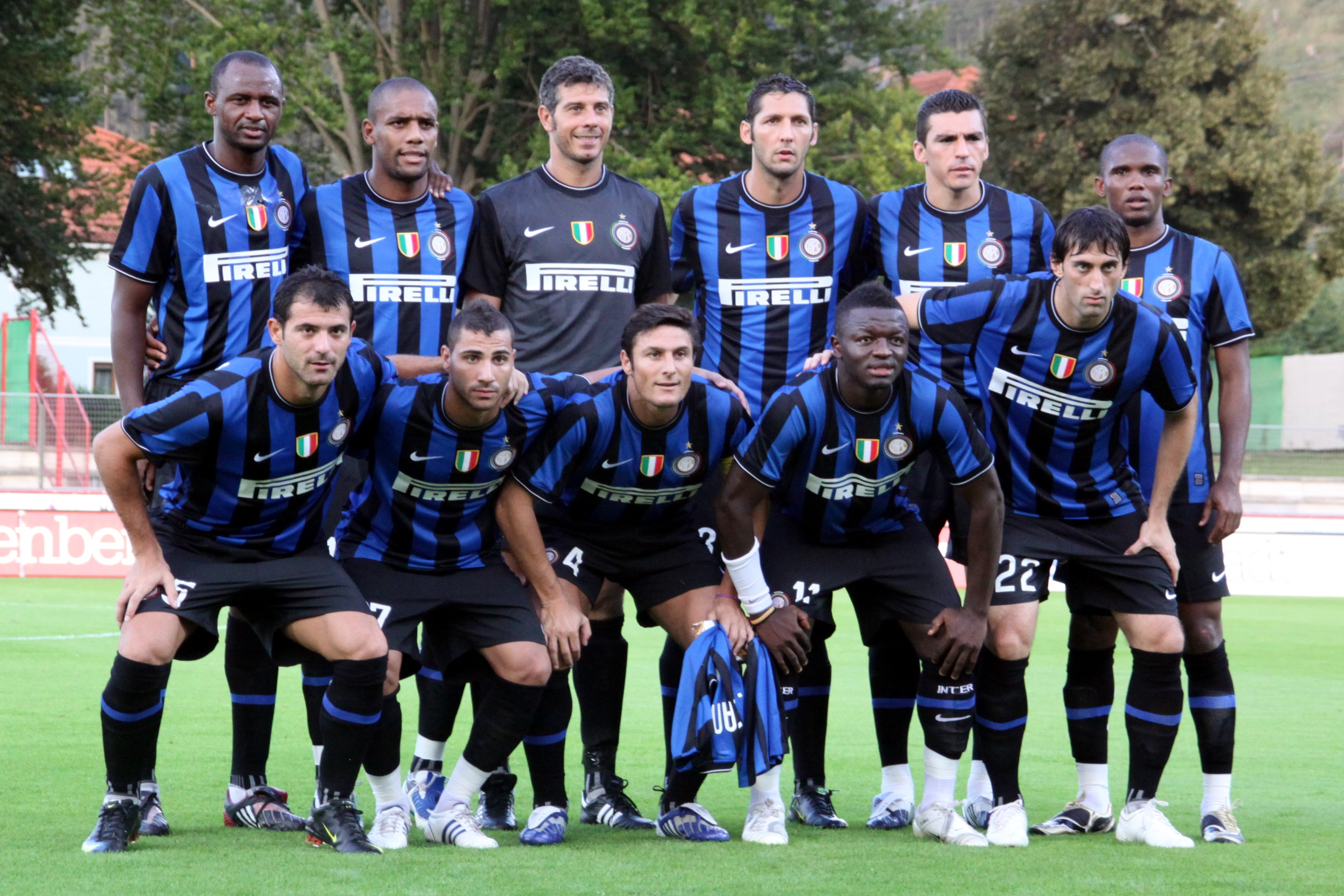
- Inter players line up before a pre-season friendly against Bahrain in August 2009
- President: Massimo Moratti
- Manager: José Mourinho
- Stadium: San Siro
- Serie A: 1st
- Supercoppa Italiana: Runners-up
- Coppa Italia: Winners
- UEFA Champions League: Winners
- Top goalscorer: League: Diego Milito (22); All: Diego Milito (30)
- Highest home attendance: 80,018 vs Milan (24 January 2010)
- Lowest home attendance: 8,316 vs Livorno (16 December 2009)
- Average home league attendance: 53,493
Home colours	Away colours	Third colours

The 2009–10 season was Inter Milan's 101st in existence and 94th consecutive season in the top flight of Italian football. This was manager José Mourinho's second and final season with the club, before his departure to Real Madrid.

Inter had the greatest season in its history, winning Serie A for the fifth consecutive season on the final matchday, the Coppa Italia, and the UEFA Champions League for the first time in 45 years, completing a historic treble. Inter became the sixth European club to complete a treble, and the first and only Italian club to achieve this feat to date.

== Season overview ==
The main transfer move was an exchange with Barcelona, as Zlatan Ibrahimović and Samuel Eto'o swapped clubs. From a tactical point of view, the line-up was not made up from this fact: Eto'o was himself a centre-forward. His partner was Diego Milito, acquired from Genoa, like the midfielder Thiago Motta. There were also the arrivals of the centre-back Lúcio and the playmaker Wesley Sneijder. Inter unveiled the season losing the Supercoppa Italiana, due to a 2–1 knockout against Lazio.

During the brief pause in September, Inter had four points in the league, which became 16 before the October pause. Meanwhile, the side had started its European adventure, from the group phase, drawing in the first part of the stage: it was renamed the "group of death" due to the presences of only national champions, from Spain (Barcelona, who was the European defending champion), Ukraine (Dynamo Kyiv) and Russia (Rubin Kazan). Inter retained the Serie A title without any obstacles, and managed to recover their form in the Champions League, finishing the group in second place behind Barcelona. In the round of 16, they defeated Chelsea (the club that José Mourinho coached from 2004 to 2007) via a 3–1 aggregate; in the quarter-finals, CSKA Moscow were beaten 1–0 in both legs. The last obstacle toward the final was, once again, Barcelona. Four days before the first leg, Inter beat Juventus 2–0. The Spanish side lost the first leg, despite having scored the first goal (with Pedro): the final score was 3–1, enough for Inter to progress to the final, despite a 1–0 loss in the second leg, and down to ten men, with a red card to Thiago Motta. As a result, Inter qualified for their first UEFA final in twelve years, since the 1998 UEFA Cup.

Prior to the final, Mourinho won an additional two trophies: the Coppa Italia and the second consecutive Scudetto, both won due to Milito's goals and leaving Roma behind. Milito was also Man of the Match for the Champions League final, scoring both goals in the 2–0 victory, whereby Inter defeated Bayern Munich, winning this trophy for the first time since 1965, and for the third time overall. In doing so, Inter became the first Italian club to achieve the Treble.

== Players ==
=== Squad information ===
As of 1 February 2010

Squad no.	Name	Nationality	Position	Date of birth (age)
Goalkeepers
1	Francesco Toldo	(Italy)	GK	2 December 1971 (aged 38)
12	Júlio César	(Brazil)	GK	3 September 1979 (aged 30)
21	Paolo Orlandoni	(Italy)	GK	12 August 1972 (aged 37)
Defenders
2	Iván Córdoba (vice-captain)	(Colombia)	CB	11 August 1976 (aged 33)
4	Javier Zanetti (captain)	(Argentina)	RB / CM / RM	10 August 1973 (aged 36)
6	Lúcio	(Brazil)	CB	8 May 1978 (aged 32)
13	Maicon	(Brazil)	RB	26 July 1981 (aged 28)
23	Marco Materazzi	(Italy)	CB	19 August 1973 (aged 36)
25	Walter Samuel	(Argentina)	CB	23 March 1978 (aged 32)
26	Cristian Chivu	(Romania)	LB / CB / DM	26 October 1980 (aged 29)
39	Davide Santon	(Italy)	RB / LB	2 January 1991 (aged 19)
Midfielders
5	Dejan Stanković	(Serbia)	CM / AM	11 September 1978 (aged 31)
8	Thiago Motta	(Brazil)	DM / CM	17 June 1984 (aged 26)
10	Wesley Sneijder	(Netherlands)	AM / CM / LW	9 June 1984 (aged 26)
11	Sulley Muntari	(Ghana)	CM	27 August 1984 (aged 25)
15	Rene Krhin	(Slovenia)	CM	21 May 1990 (aged 20)
17	McDonald Mariga	(Kenya)	DM / CM	4 April 1987 (aged 23)
19	Esteban Cambiasso	(Argentina)	DM / CM	18 August 1980 (aged 29)
Forwards
7	Ricardo Quaresma	(Portugal)	RW	26 September 1983 (aged 26)
9	Samuel Eto'o	(Cameroon)	CF	10 March 1981 (aged 29)
22	Diego Milito	(Argentina)	CF	12 June 1979 (aged 31)
27	Goran Pandev	(North Macedonia)	SS / RW / CF	25 March 1983 (aged 27)
45	Mario Balotelli	(Italy)	SS / RW / CF	12 August 1990 (aged 19)
89	Marko Arnautović	(Austria)	CF	19 April 1989 (aged 21)
Players transferred out during the season
14	Patrick Vieira	(France)	CM / DM	23 June 1976 (aged 34)
18	David Suazo	(Honduras)	CF	5 November 1979 (aged 30)
30	Mancini	(Brazil)	LW / RW	1 August 1980 (aged 29)

==== From youth squad ====
Note: Flags indicate national team as defined under FIFA eligibility rules; some limited exceptions apply. Players may hold more than one non-FIFA nationality.

No.	Pos.	Nation	Player
28	MF	SRB	Alen Stevanović
29	DF	ITA	Giulio Donati
31	FW	ROU	Denis Alibec
44	MF	SWE	Sebastian Carlsén
48	MF	ITA	Lorenzo Crisetig
51	GK	SLO	Vid Belec

== Transfers ==
Confirmed transfers 2009–10

=== In ===
No.	Pos.	Nat.	Name	Age	EU	Moving from	Type	Transfer window	Ends	Transfer fee	Source
18	FW	(Honduras)	Suazo	29	EU	Benfica (Portugal)	Loan return	Summer	2011	Free	
7	MF	(Portugal)	Quaresma	25	EU	Chelsea (England)	Loan return	Summer	2012	Free	
15	MF	(France)	Dacourt	34	EU	Fulham (England)	Loan return	Summer	2009	Free	
	MF	(Montenegro)	Fatić	20	Non-EU	Salernitana	Loan return	Summer		Free	
	FW	(Italy)	Acquafresca	21	EU	Cagliari	Loan return	Summer		Free	
	DF	(Italy)	Bonucci	22	EU	Pisa	Loan return	Summer		Free	
	FW	(France)	Biabiany	21	EU	Modena	Loan return	Summer		Free	
	FW	(Italy)	Meggiorini	23	EU	Cittadella	Co-ownership Termination	Summer		undisclosed	inter.it
22	FW	(Argentina)	Milito	30	EU	Genoa	Transfer	Summer	2013	€28M (€13.5M cash + Acquafresca + Meggiorini)	inter.it, genoacfc.itregistroimprese.it
8	MF	(Brazil)	Thiago Motta	26	EU	Genoa	Transfer	Summer	2013	€10.2M (€4.2M cash + Bolzoni + Bonucci)	inter.it, genoacfc.it registroimprese.it
	FW	(Romania)	Alibec	18	EU	Farul Constanța (Romania)	Transfer	Summer	2013	undisclosed	inter.it
76	MF	(Brazil)	Kerlon	21	Non-EU	Chievo	Transfer	Summer	2012	undisclosed	inter.it
6	DF	(Brazil)	Lúcio	31	Non-EU	Bayern Munich (Germany)	Transfer	Summer	2012	€7.85M	inter.it, fcbayern.de registroimprese.it
9	FW	(Cameroon)	Eto'o	28	EU	Barcelona (Spain)	Transfer	Summer	2014	€20M (Included in Ibrahimović transfer)	inter.it, fcbarcelona.cat
89	FW	(Austria)	Arnautović	20	EU	Twente (Netherlands)	Loan	Summer	2010	undisclosed	inter.it, fctwente.com
10	MF	(Netherlands)	Sneijder	25	EU	Real Madrid (Spain)	Transfer	Summer	2013	€18M	inter.it, realmadrid.comregistroimprese.it
27	FW	(North Macedonia)	Pandev	26	Non-EU	Lazio	Transfer	Winter	2014	Free	inter.it
17	MF	(Kenya)	Mariga	22	Non-EU	Parma	Co-ownership	Winter	2014	about €5M (cash plus Biabiany's half, €2.5M)	inter.it registroimprese.it
11	MF	(Chile)	Jiménez	25	Non-EU	West Ham United (England)	Loan return	Winter	2012	Free	inter.it

Total spending: ▼€89.05 million

=== Out ===
No.	Pos.	Nat.	Name	Age	EU	Moving to	Type	Transfer window	Transfer fee	Source
10	FW	(Brazil)	Adriano	27	Non-EU	Flamengo (Brazil)	Release	Summer	Free	inter.it
7	MF	(Portugal)	Figo	36	EU	Retired	Retired	Summer	Free	inter.it
18	FW	(Argentina)	Crespo	33	EU	Genoa	End of contract	Summer	Free	genoacfc.it
9	FW	(Argentina)	Cruz	34	EU	Lazio	End of contract	Summer	Free	
15	MF	(France)	Dacourt	34	EU	Standard Liège (Belgium)	End of contract	Summer	Free	
11	MF	(Chile)	Jiménez	25	EU	West Ham United (England)	Loan	Summer	undisclosed	inter.it, whufc.com
	MF	(Belgium) (Morocco)	Maaroufi	20	EU	Vicenza	Co-ownership Termination	Summer	undisclosed	inter.it
	MF	(Montenegro)	Fatić	20	Non-EU	Chievo	Co-ownership Termination	Summer	undisclosed	inter.it
	FW	(Italy)	Acquafresca	21	EU	Genoa	Swap	Summer	€9.5M (Included in Milito transfer)	inter.it, genoacfc.it registroimprese.it
	FW	(Italy)	Meggiorini	23	EU	Genoa	Swap	Summer	€5M (Included in Milito transfer)	inter.it, genoacfc.itregistroimprese.it
36	MF	(Italy)	Bolzoni	20	EU	Genoa	Swap	Summer	€3M (Included in Thiago Motta transfer)	inter.it, genoacfc.it
	DF	(Italy)	Bonucci	22	EU	Genoa	Swap	Summer	€3M (Included in Thiago Motta transfer)	inter.it, genoacfc.it
	FW	(France)	Biabiany	21	EU	Parma	Loan	Summer	undisclosed	
37	DF	(Italy)	Mei	20	EU	Crotone	Loan	Summer	undisclosed	inter.it
6	DF	(Brazil)	Maxwell	27	EU	Barcelona (Spain)	Transfer	Summer	€4.5M + €0.5M in variables	inter.it, fcbarcelona.cat
8	FW	(Sweden)	Ibrahimović	27	EU	Barcelona (Spain)	Transfer	Summer	€69.5M (€49.5M + Eto'o)	inter.it, fcbarcelona.comregistroimprese.itBarca report
	DF	(Italy)	Toppan	19	EU	Villacidrese	Loan	Summer	undisclosed	inter.it
	MF	(Italy)	Lombardo	24	EU	Villacidrese	Loan	Summer	undisclosed	inter.it
16	DF	(Argentina)	Burdisso	28	EU	Roma	Loan	Summer	undisclosed	inter.it asroma.it
21	FW	(Nigeria)	Obinna	22	Non-EU	Málaga (Spain)	Loan	Summer	undisclosed	inter.it, malagacf.com
	DF	(Brazil)	Rincón	22	Non-EU	Piacenza	Loan	Summer	undisclosed	inter.it, piacenzacalcio.it
24	DF	(Colombia)	Rivas	26	Non-EU	Livorno	Loan	Summer	undisclosed	livornocalcio.it
76	MF	(Brazil)	Kerlon	21	Non-EU	Ajax (Netherlands)	Loan	Summer	undisclosed	ajax.nl
18	FW	(Honduras)	Suazo	30	EU	Genoa	Loan	Winter	undisclosed	inter.it
14	MF	(France)	Vieira	33	EU	Manchester City (England)	Transfer	Winter	undisclosed	inter.it
30	MF	(Brazil)	Mancini	29	EU	Milan	Loan	Winter	undisclosed	inter.it
	FW	(France)	Biabiany	21	EU	Parma	Co-ownership	Winter	€2.5M (included in Mariga transfer)	inter.it
11	MF	(Chile)	Jiménez	25	EU	Parma	Loan	Winter	included in Mariga transfer	inter.it

Last updated: 2 February

Total income: ▲€97 million

=== Out on loan ===
EU	Country	N	P	Name	Cap	Age	Since	App (L/C/E/S)	(L/C/E/S)	Ends	Transfer fee	Notes
EU passport	(Italy)		GK	Alfonso		38	2007	1 (0/1/0/0)	0 (0/0/0/0)		undisclosed	on loan to Modena, co-ownership with Chievo
EU passport	(Romania)		DF	Daminuță		36	2008	0 (0/0/0/0)	0 (0/0/0/0)		undisclosed	on loan to Modena
EU passport	(Hungary)		FW	Filkor		38	2006	2 (0/2/0/0)	0 (0/0/0/0)		undisclosed	on loan to Sassuolo
EU passport	(Italy)		FW	Litteri		38	2008	0 (0/0/0/0)	0 (0/0/0/0)		Youth Team	on loan to Vicenza
EU passport	(Italy)	37	DF	Mei		37	2008	0 (0/0/0/0)	0 (0/0/0/0)		Youth Team	on loan to Crotone
EU passport	(Italy)		FW	Napoli		37	2007	1 (0/1/0/0)	0 (0/0/0/0)		undisclosed	on loan to Modena
EU passport	(Italy)		DF	Pedrelli		38	2008	0 (0/0/0/0)	0 (0/0/0/0)		undisclosed	on loan to Cesena
EU passport	(Italy)		MF	Siligardi		38	2008	2 (0/2/0/0)	0 (0/0/0/0)		Youth Team	on loan to Triestina
EU passport	(Italy)		GK	Viviano		40	2009 Winter	0 (0/0/0/0)	0 (0/0/0/0)		undisclosed	co-ownership with Bologna
EU passport	(Italy)		DF	Toppan		1990	N/A	0 (0/0/0/0)	0 (0/0/0/0)		Youth Team	on loan to Villacidrese
EU passport	(Italy)		MF	Lombardo		1985	N/A	0 (0/0/0/0)	0 (0/0/0/0)		Youth Team	on loan to Villacidrese
Non-EU	(Brazil)		MF	Coutinho		34	2008	0 (0/0/0/0)	0 (0/0/0/0)	2012	€3.8M	on loan to Vasco da Gama
EU passport	(Argentina)	6	DF	Burdisso		45	2004	139 (93/26/18/2)	8 (4/4/0/0)	2011	€3.5M	on loan to Roma
Non-EU	(Nigeria)		FW	Obinna		39	2008	11 (9/2/0/0)	1 (1/0/0/0)	2012	Free	on loan to Málaga
Non-EU	(Brazil)		DF	Rincón		39	2006	0 (0/0/0/0)	0 (0/0/0/0)		Youth Team	on loan to Piacenza
Non-EU	(Colombia)	24	DF	Rivas		43	2007	27 (16/6/4/1)	0 (0/0/0/0)	2011	undisclosed	on loan to Livorno
Non-EU	(Brazil)	76	MF	Kerlon		38	2009	0 (0/0/0/0)	0 (0/0/0/0)	2012	Free	on loan to Ajax
EU passport	(Honduras)	18	FW	Suazo		47	2007	38 (28/3/6/1)	8 (8/0/0/0)	2011	€13M	on loan to Genoa
EU passport	(Brazil)	30	MF	Mancini		46	2008	27 (20/2/4/1)	2 (1/0/1/0)	2012	€13M	on loan to Milan
EU passport	(Chile)		MF	Jiménez		42	2007	30 (21/5/3/1)	4 (3/0/1/0)	2012	undisclosed	on loan to Parma, co-ownership with Ternana

Last updated: 10 January
EU = if holds or not a European Union passport; Country: when 2 flags, 1st flag = country that plays for internationally, 2nd flag = country of birth; N = number on jersey; P = Position; Name = Name on jersey (for more extensive name, pause mouse pointer on the name); Cap: Cap = Captain, VC = Vice-captain; Since = the year the player start be a permanent part of the squad; App and = Only competitive appearances and goals. See source for more detail; Ends = when the player's current contract ends.

== Club ==
=== Non-playing staff ===
Position	Staff
Head coach	(Portugal) José Mourinho
Vice coach	(Italy) Giuseppe Baresi
Fitness coach Technical Assistant	(Portugal) Rui Faria
Technical Assistant	(Portugal) José Morais
Technical Assistant	(Italy) Daniele Bernazzani
Goalkeeper coach	(Portugal) Silvino Louro
Chief of Medical Staff	(Italy) Franco Combi
Doctor	(Italy) Giorgio Panico
Masseurs; Physiotherapists	(Italy) Marco Dellacasa
Masseurs; Physiotherapists	(Italy) Massimo Dellacasa
Masseurs; Physiotherapists	(Italy) Andrea Galli
Masseurs; Physiotherapists	(Italy) Luigi Sessolo
Masseurs; Physiotherapists	(Italy) Alberto Galbiati
Director in charge of transfers	(Italy) Marco Branca
Transfer Market Consultant; First-Team Representative	(Italy) Gabriele Oriali

Last updated: 20 October 2009
Source: F.C. Internazionale Milano Official Website

== Pre-season and friendlies ==
=== World Football Challenge ===
20 July 2009 World Football Challenge	América	1–1 (5–4 p)	Internazionale	Stanford, United States
01:00 CET	Silva 51'	Report	Córdoba 61'	Stadium: Stanford Stadium; Attendance: 31,026; Referee: Baldomero Toledo (United States)
	Penalties
	Chitiva (penalty scored); Mosquera (penalty scored); Silva (penalty scored); Márquez (penalty scored); Ó. Rojas (penalty scored)		(penalty scored) Balotelli; (penalty scored) Milito; (penalty scored) Ibrahimović; (penalty missed) Vieira; (penalty scored) Burdisso

22 July 2009 World Football Challenge	Chelsea	2–0	Internazionale	Pasadena, United States
05:00 CET	Drogba 11'; Lampard 50' (pen.)	Report		Stadium: Rose Bowl; Attendance: 81,224; Referee: Ricardo Salazar (United States)

26 July 2009 World Football Challenge	Internazionale	2–0	Milan	Foxborough, United States
23:00 CET	Milito 4', 75'	Report		Stadium: Gillette Stadium; Attendance: 57,229; Referee: Paul Ward (United States)

=== TIM Trophy ===
14 August 2009 TIM Trophy	Internazionale	1–1 (5–6 p)	Juventus	Pescara, Italy
20:30 CET	Motta 25'; Materazzi (red card) 39'	Report	Iaquinta (penalty missed) 41'; Amauri 43'	Stadium: Stadio Adriatico; Referee: Antonio Damato (Italy)
	Penalties
	Milito (penalty scored); Balotelli (penalty scored); Chivu (penalty scored); Motta (penalty scored); Samuel (penalty missed); Vieira (penalty scored); Santon (penalty missed)		(penalty scored) Salihamidžić; (penalty scored) Grygera; (penalty scored) Felipe Melo; (penalty missed) Poulsen; (penalty scored) Amauri; (penalty scored) Iaquinta; (penalty scored) Legrottaglie

14 August 2009 TIM Trophy	Milan	0–1	Internazionale	Pescara, Italy
21:50 CET		Report	Balotelli 24'	Stadium: Stadio Adriatico; Referee: Paolo Valeri (Italy)

=== Other friendlies ===
17 July 2009 Friendly	UCLA Bruins	2–2	Internazionale	Los Angeles, United States
01:00 CET	Carasco 39'; Griffin 71'	Report	Materazzi 51'; Stanković 68'	Stadium: Drake Stadium; Attendance: 55,000; Referee: Alex Gorin (United States)

30 July 2009 Pirelli Cup-Sky Trophy	Monaco	0–1	Internazionale	Fontvieille, Monaco
21:00 CET		Report	Milito 56'	Stadium: Stade Louis II; Attendance: 14,500; Referee: David Mezouar (France)

16 August 2009 Friendly	Bahrain	0–1	Internazionale	Kapfenberg, Austria
19:30 CET		Report	Mancini 63'	Stadium: Franz Fekete Stadium

5 September 2009 Friendly	Lugano	3–3	Internazionale	Lugano, Switzerland
17:30 CET	Fejzulahi 19'; Silva 54'; Sílvio 69'	Report	Quaresma 24'; Vieira 56'; Mancini 63'	Stadium: Cornaredo Stadium; Referee: Carlo Bertolini (Italy)

10 October 2009 Friendly	Piacenza	2–1	Internazionale	Piacenza, Italy
16:00 CET	Moscardelli 51'; Guerra 83'	Report	Mancini 28' (pen.)	Stadium: Stadio Leonardo Garilli; Referee: Romeo (Italy)

14 November 2009 Friendly	Vaduz	1–2	Internazionale	Vaduz, Liechtenstein
17:00 CET	Bader 28'	Report	Arnautović 16', 63'	Stadium: Rheinpark Stadion; Referee: Luca Gut (Italy)

2 January 2010 Friendly	Al-Hilal	0–1	Internazionale	Riyadh, Saudi Arabia
19:00 CET		Report	Milito 85'	Stadium: King Fahd International Stadium

== Competitions ==
=== Overview ===
Competition	First match	Last match	Starting round	Final position	Record							
Competition	First match	Last match	Starting round	Final position	Pld	W	D	L	GF	GA	GD	Win %
Serie A	23 August 2009	16 May 2010	Matchday 1	Winners	38	24	10	4	75	34	+41	63.16
Coppa Italia	16 December 2009	5 May 2010	Round of 16	Winners	5	5	0	0	6	1	+5	100.00
Supercoppa Italiana	8 August 2009		Final	Runners-up	1	0	0	1	1	2	−1	0.00
Champions League	16 September 2009	22 May 2010	Group stage	Winners	13	8	3	2	17	9	+8	61.54
Total					57	37	13	7	99	46	+53	64.91

Source: Serie A statistics, Coppa Italia statistics, UEFA Champions League statistics

=== Supercoppa Italiana ===
8 August 2009	Internazionale	1–2	Lazio	Beijing, China
20:30 CST (UTC+08:00)	Muntari (yellow card) 29'; Eto'o 77'; Maicon (yellow card) 89'; Chivu (yellow card) 89'	Report	Matuzalém (yellow card) 30', (goal) 63'; Rocchi 66'	Stadium: Beijing National Stadium; Attendance: 68,961; Referee: Emidio Morganti

=== Serie A ===
==== League table ====
Pos	Team	Pld	W	D	L	GF	GA	GD	Pts	Qualification or relegation
1	Internazionale (C)	38	24	10	4	75	34	+41	82	Qualification to Champions League group stage
2	Roma	38	24	8	6	68	41	+27	80	Qualification to Champions League group stage
3	Milan	38	20	10	8	60	39	+21	70	Qualification to Champions League group stage
4	Sampdoria	38	19	10	9	49	41	+8	67	Qualification to Champions League play-off round
5	Palermo	38	18	11	9	59	47	+12	65	Qualification to Europa League play-off round

Source: Lega Calcio and Yahoo! Sport
Rules for classification: 1) points; 2) head-to-head points; 3) head-to-head goal difference; 4) head-to-head goals scored; 5) goal difference; 6) number of goals scored.
(C) Champions

==== Results summary ====
Overall								Home						Away					
Pld	W	D	L	GF	GA	GD	Pts	W	D	L	GF	GA	GD	W	D	L	GF	GA	GD
38	24	10	4	75	34	+41	82	15	4	0	42	15	+27	9	6	4	33	19	+14

Source: Internazionale Milano

==== Results by round ====
Round	1	2	3	4	5	6	7	8	9	10	11	12	13	14	15	16	17	18	19	20	21	22	23	24	25	26	27	28	29	30	31	32	33	34	35	36	37	38
Ground	H	A	H	A	H	A	H	A	H	H	A	H	A	H	A	A	H	A	H	A	H	A	H	A	H	A	H	A	A	H	A	H	A	H	H	A	H	A
Result	D	W	W	W	W	L	W	W	W	W	W	D	W	W	L	D	W	W	W	D	W	D	W	D	D	W	D	L	D	W	L	W	D	W	W	W	W	W
Position	12	5	4	3	1	3	1	1	1	1	1	1	1	1	1	1	1	1	1	1	1	1	1	1	1	1	1	1	1	1	1	1	2	2	1	1	1	1

Source: Competitive Matches
A = Away; H = Home; W = Win; D = Draw; L = Loss

==== Matches ====
23 August 2009 1	Internazionale	1–1	Bari	Milan
18:00 CET	Vieira (yellow card) 25'; Materazzi (yellow card) 42'; Eto'o 56' (pen.); Stanković (yellow card) 90+3'	Report	Langella (yellow card) 61'; Masiello (yellow card) 71'; Kutuzov 74'	Stadium: San Siro; Attendance: 53,369; Referee: Carmine Russo

29 August 2009 2	Milan	0–4	Internazionale	Milan
20:45 CET	Flamini (yellow card) 6'; Gattuso (yellow card) 35' (yellow-red card) 41'	Report	Motta 29'; Samuel (yellow card) 34'; Milito 36' (pen.); Maicon 45+1'; Stanković 67'; Chivu (yellow card) 81'	Stadium: San Siro; Attendance: 78,467; Referee: Nicola Rizzoli

13 September 2009 3	Internazionale	2–0	Parma	Milan
15:00 CET	Vieira (yellow card) 9'; Motta (yellow card) 40'; Eto'o 71', (yellow card) 73'; Milito 88'	Report	Galloppa (yellow card) 14'	Stadium: San Siro; Attendance: 51,327; Referee: Roberto Rosetti

20 September 2009 4	Cagliari	1–2	Internazionale	Cagliari
15:00 CET	Jeda 16' (pen.); Astori (yellow card) 35'; Conti (yellow card) 40'	Report	Cambiasso (yellow card) 9'; Maicon (yellow card) 15'; Milito 51', 55'; Eto'o (yellow card) 53'	Stadium: Stadio Sant'Elia; Attendance: 78,467; Referee: Daniele Orsato

23 September 2009 5	Internazionale	3–1	Napoli	Milan
20:45 CET	Eto'o 3'; Milito 5'; Lúcio 32'; Stanković (yellow card) 55'; Maicon (yellow card) 74'	Report	Lavezzi 37'; Bogliacino (yellow card) 54'; Contini (yellow card) 55'	Stadium: San Siro; Attendance: 41,695; Referee: Matteo Trefoloni

26 September 2009 6	Sampdoria	1–0	Internazionale	Genoa
18:00 CET	Palombo (yellow card) 25'; Lucchini (yellow card) 35'; Cassano (yellow card) 39'; Pazzini 72', (yellow card) 73'; Gastaldello (yellow card) 78'	Report	Maicon (yellow card) 57'	Stadium: Stadio Luigi Ferraris; Attendance: 30,669; Referee: Nicola Rizzoli

3 October 2009 7	Internazionale	2–1	Udinese	Milan
20:45 CET	Sneijder (yellow card) 19', (goal) 90+3'; Stanković 23'; Chivu (yellow card) 55'	Report	Di Natele 27'; Floro Flores (yellow card) 45'; Domizzi (yellow card) 45+1'; Luković (yellow card) 68'; Corradi (yellow card) 78'; Coda (yellow card) 84'	Stadium: San Siro; Attendance: 50,000; Referee: Mauro Bergonzi

17 October 2009 8	Genoa	0–5	Internazionale	Genoa
15:00 CET	Modesto (yellow card) 23'; Scarpi (red card) 45+4'; Milanetto (yellow card) 72'	Report	Cambiasso 6'; Balotelli (yellow card) 12', (goal) 31'; Samuel (yellow card) 24'; Stanković 45+4'; Muntari (yellow card) 46'; Vieira 66'; Maicon 71'	Stadium: Stadio Luigi Ferraris; Attendance: 32,942; Referee: Emidio Morganti

24 October 2009 9	Internazionale	2–1	Catania	Milan
20:45 CET	Muntari 12'; Sneijder 31'; Zanetti (yellow card) 45'; Córdoba (yellow card) 64'	Report	Spolli (yellow card) 22'; Carboni (yellow card) 58'; Mascara 84' (pen.); Silvestre (yellow card) 86'	Stadium: San Siro; Attendance: 57,745; Referee: Antonio Danilo Giannoccaro

29 October 2009 10	Internazionale	5–3	Palermo	Milan
20:45 CET	Eto'o 7' (pen.), 43'; Balotelli 34', 42'; Chivu (yellow card) 36'; Milito 83'	Report	Goian (yellow card) 38'; Miccoli 49', 67'; Hernández 62'; Bertolo (yellow card) 86'	Stadium: San Siro; Attendance: 53,261; Referee: Paolo Tagliavento

1 November 2009 11	Livorno	0–2	Internazionale	Livorno
15:00 CET	Raimondi (yellow card) 76'; Tavano (yellow card) 82'	Report	Lúcio (yellow card) 37'; Milito 49'; Maicon 80'	Stadium: Stadio Armando Picchi; Attendance: 15,736; Referee: Emidio Morganti

8 November 2009 12	Internazionale	1–1	Roma	Milan
20:45 CET	Muntari (yellow card) 40'; Eto'o 48'; Motta (yellow card) 54'; Stanković (yellow card) 62'	Report	Vučinić 13'; Ménez (yellow card) 45+1'; Pizarro (yellow card) 78'	Stadium: San Siro; Attendance: 56,807; Referee: Gianluca Rocchi

21 November 2009 13	Bologna	1–3	Internazionale	Bologna
18:00 CET	Zalayeta 23'	Report	Milito 22'; Balotelli (yellow card) 37', (goal) 41'; Cambiasso 72'; Motta (yellow card) 76'; Maicon (red card) 90+1'	Stadium: Stadio Renato Dall'Ara; Attendance: 32,067; Referee: Roberto Rosetti

29 November 2009 14	Internazionale	1–0	Fiorentina	Milan
15:00 CET	Chivu (yellow card) 33'; Samuel (yellow card) 79'; Milito 85' (pen.)	Report	Gobbi (yellow card) 35'; Krøldrup (yellow card) 42'; Zanetti (yellow card) 67'; Comotto (yellow card) 84'	Stadium: San Siro; Attendance: 59,417; Referee: Antonio Damato

5 December 2009 15	Juventus	2–1	Internazionale	Turin
20:45 CET	Chiellini 20'; Felipe Melo (yellow card) 25' (yellow-red card) 86'; Marchisio 58'; Grosso (yellow card) 61'; Amauri (yellow card) 80'; Cáceres (yellow card) 90+3'	Report	Muntari (yellow card) 23'; Eto'o 26'; Samuel (yellow card) 27'	Stadium: Stadio Olimpico di Torino; Attendance: 25,530; Referee: Massimiliano Saccani

13 December 2009 16	Atalanta	1–1	Internazionale	Bologna
15:00 CET	Garics (yellow card) 32'; Tiribocchi 81'; Padoin (yellow card) 83'	Report	Milito 15'; Sneijder (yellow card) 26' (yellow-red card) 64'	Stadium: Stadio Atleti Azzurri d'Italia; Attendance: 14,608; Referee: Nicola Rizzoli

20 December 2009 17	Internazionale	1–0	Lazio	Milan
20:45 CET	Eto'o 14'; Motta (yellow card) 23'; Stanković (yellow card) 84'	Report	Baronio (yellow card) 30'; Stendardo (yellow card) 67'; Del Nero (yellow card) 78'; Radu (yellow card) 85'	Stadium: San Siro; Attendance: 52,859; Referee: Carmine Russo

6 January 2010 18	Chievo	0–1	Internazionale	Verona
12:30 CET	Sardo (yellow card) 59'; Marcolini (yellow card) 63'; Pelissier (yellow card) 75'	Report	Chivu (yellow card) 5'; Balotelli 12', (yellow card) 34'; Vieira (yellow card) 40'; Córdoba (yellow card) 70'; Maicon (yellow card) 90+3'	Stadium: Stadio Marcantonio Bentegodi; Attendance: 25,579; Referee: Nicola Pierpaoli

9 January 2010 19	Internazionale	4–3	Siena	Milan
20:45 CET	Milito 24'; Sneijder 36', 88', (yellow card) 75'; Stanković (yellow card) 41'; Samuel 90+3', (yellow card) 90+4'	Report	Maccarone 18', 65'; Ekdal 37'; Codrea (yellow card) 90'; Cribari (red card) 90+4'	Stadium: San Siro; Attendance: 52,979; Referee: Sebastiano Peruzzo

16 January 2010 20	Bari	2–2	Internazionale	Bari
20:45 CET	Parisi (yellow card) 34'; Barreto 60' (pen.), 63' (pen.); Bonucci (yellow card) 73'; Belmonte (yellow card) 89'	Report	Samuel (yellow card) 59'; Lúcio (yellow card) 62'; Pandev 69'; Milito 74' (pen.)	Stadium: Stadio San Nicola; Attendance: 51,855; Referee: Roberto Rosetti

24 January 2010 21	Internazionale	2–0	Milan	Milan
20:45 CET	Milito 10'; Lúcio (yellow card) 26' (yellow-red card) 90+1'; Sneijder (red card) 27'; Muntari (yellow card) 38'; Pandev 65', (yellow card) 66'	Report	Beckham (yellow card) 3'; Favalli (yellow card) 28'; Thiago Silva (yellow card) 69'; Ronaldinho (penalty missed) 90+2'	Stadium: San Siro; Attendance: 80,018; Referee: Gianluca Rocchi

10 February 2010 22	Parma	1–1	Internazionale	Parma
20:45 CET	Morrone (yellow card) 37'; Bojinov 54'; Valiani (yellow card) 64' (yellow-red card) 72'	Report	Pandev (yellow card) 19'; Balotelli 59'; Cambiasso (yellow card) 88'	Stadium: Stadio Ennio Tardini; Attendance: 20,128; Referee: Mauro Bergonzi

7 February 2010 23	Internazionale	3–0	Cagliari	Milan
15:00 CET	Pandev 6'; Samuel 20'; Milito 47', (yellow card) 81'; Motta (yellow card) 65'	Report		Stadium: San Siro; Attendance: 57,079; Referee: Andrea Gervasoni

14 February 2010 24	Napoli	0–0	Internazionale	Naples
20:45 CET	Pazienza (yellow card) 2'; Zúñiga (yellow card) 45+2'; Gargano (yellow card) 86'	Report	Maicon (yellow card) 20'; Muntari (yellow card) 27'; Sneijder (yellow card) 51'	Stadium: Stadio San Paolo; Attendance: 56,211; Referee: Roberto Rosetti

20 February 2010 25	Internazionale	0–0	Sampdoria	Milan
20:45 CET	Samuel (yellow card) 28' (yellow-red card) 31'; Córdoba (yellow card) 33' (yellow-red card) 38'; Eto'o (yellow card) 55'	Report	Pozzi (yellow card) 24'; Pazzini (yellow card) 35' (yellow-red card) 73'; Lucchini (yellow card) 63'	Stadium: San Siro; Attendance: 53,806; Referee: Paolo Tagliavento

28 February 2010 26	Udinese	2–3	Internazionale	Udine
15:00 CET	Pepe 2'; Coda (yellow card) 8'; Di Natale 52'; Sammarco (yellow card) 67'; Asamoah (yellow card) 90+2'	Report	Balotelli 5', (yellow card) 68'; Maicon 21'; Zanetti (yellow card) 39'; Milito 45+1'; Stanković (yellow card) 90+1'	Stadium: Stadio Friuli; Attendance: 23,874; Referee: Mauro Bergonzi

7 March 2010 27	Internazionale	0–0	Genoa	Milan
20:45 CET	Samuel (yellow card) 52'; Balotelli (yellow card) 90+3'	Report	Criscito (yellow card) 11'	Stadium: San Siro; Attendance: 51,795; Referee: Luca Banti

12 March 2010 28	Catania	3–1	Internazionale	Catania
20:45 CET	Biagianti (yellow card) 24'; López 74'; Mascara 81' (pen.); Martínez (yellow card) 76', (goal) 90'	Report	Zanetti (yellow card) 45'; Stanković (yellow card) 51'; Milito 54'; Muntari (yellow card) 80' (yellow-red card) 81'	Stadium: Stadio Angelo Massimino; Attendance: 20,941; Referee: Paolo Valeri

20 March 2010 29	Palermo	1–1	Internazionale	Palermo
20:45 CET	Bovo (yellow card) 10'; Cavani 24'; Migliaccio (yellow card) 86'	Report	Milito 11' (pen.), (yellow card) 90+1'; Stanković (yellow card) 15'; Lúcio (yellow card) 45+1'; Maicon (yellow card) 59'; Samuel (yellow card) 82'	Stadium: Stadio Renzo Barbera; Attendance: 35,753; Referee: Antonio Damato

24 March 2010 30	Internazionale	3–0	Livorno	Milan
20:45 CET	Eto'o 36', 41'; Maicon 61'; Mariga (yellow card) 76'	Report	Perticone (yellow card) 30'; Vitale (yellow card) 66'	Stadium: San Siro; Attendance: 53,086; Referee: Christian Brighi

27 March 2010 31	Roma	2–1	Internazionale	Rome
18:00 CET	De Rossi 17'; Ménez (yellow card) 26'; Perrotta (yellow card) 57'; Toni 72'; Brighi (yellow card) 90'	Report	Samuel (yellow card) 30'; Zanetti (yellow card) 31'; Motta (yellow card) 37'; Lúcio (yellow card) 55'; Milito 66'; Maicon (yellow card) 80'; Eto'o (yellow card) 84'; Chivu (yellow card) 90+1'	Stadium: Stadio Olimpico; Attendance: 61,898; Referee: Emidio Morganti

3 April 2010 32	Internazionale	3–0	Bologna	Milan
15:00 CET	Motta 29', 82'; Balotelli 52'; Stanković (yellow card) 72'	Report	Lanna (yellow card) 54'	Stadium: San Siro; Attendance: 57,169; Referee: Luca Banti

10 April 2010 33	Fiorentina	2–2	Internazionale	Florence
20:45 CET	Keirrison 11'; Pasqual (yellow card) 18'; Krøldrup (yellow card) 42', (goal) 82'; Natali (yellow card) 53'; Bolatti (yellow card) 78'; Gobbi (yellow card) 90+1'	Report	Chivu (yellow card) 39'; Milito 74'; Eto'o 81'; Muntari (yellow card) 90+1'	Stadium: Stadio Artemio Franchi; Attendance: 36,981; Referee: Mauro Bergonzi

16 April 2010 34	Internazionale	2–0	Juventus	Milan
20:45 CET	Samuel (yellow card) 19'; Motta (yellow card) 21'; Maicon 75'; Eto'o 90+2', (yellow card) 90+2'; Balotelli (yellow card) 90+3'	Report	Iaquinta (yellow card) 19'; Felipe Melo (yellow card) 20'; Sissoko (yellow card) 21' (yellow-red card) 37'; Chiellini (yellow card) 74'	Stadium: San Siro; Attendance: 46,164; Referee: Antonio Damato

24 April 2010 35	Internazionale	3–1	Atalanta	Milan
18:00 CET	Milito 24'; Stanković (yellow card) 27'; Mariga 35'; Córdoba (yellow card) 47'; Chivu 78'; Materazzi (yellow card) 83'	Report	Tiribocchi 5'; Bianco (yellow card) 8'; Coppola (yellow card) 33'; Manfredini (yellow card) 63'	Stadium: San Siro; Attendance: 63,779; Referee: Daniele Orsato

2 May 2010 36	Lazio	0–2	Internazionale	Rome
20:45 CET	Zárate (yellow card) 45'	Report	Cambiasso (yellow card) 38'; Samuel 45+1'; Motta 70'	Stadium: Stadio Olimpico; Attendance: 50,945; Referee: Mauro Bergonzi

9 May 2010 37	Internazionale	4–3	Chievo	Milan
18:00 CET	Mantovani 13' (o.g.); Cambiasso 34'; Milito 39'; Balotelli 52'	Report	Motta 12' (o.g.); Granoche 60'; Sardo (yellow card) 70'; Pellissier 74'	Stadium: San Siro; Attendance: 75,379; Referee: Luca Banti

16 May 2010 38	Siena	0–1	Internazionale	Siena
15:00 CET	Del Grosso (yellow card) 11'; Cribari (yellow card) 17'; Brandão (yellow card) 64'; Codrea (yellow card) 65'	Report	Milito 57'; Chivu (yellow card) 85'; Toldo (yellow card) 90+2'	Stadium: Stadio Artemio Franchi; Attendance: 15,373; Referee: Emidio Morganti

=== Coppa Italia ===
16 December 2009 Round of 16	Internazionale	1–0	Livorno	Milan
21:00 CET	Stanković (yellow card) 45'; Sneijder 60'	Report	Diniz (yellow card) 47'; Marchini (yellow card) 71'	Stadium: San Siro; Attendance: 8,316; Referee: Sebastiano Peruzzo

28 January 2010 Quarter-finals	Internazionale	2–1	Juventus	Milan
21:00 CET	Maicon (yellow card) 42'; Lúcio 72'; Balotelli 89'	Report	Diego 10'; Chiellini (yellow card) 50'; Felipe Melo (yellow card) 70'; Cannavaro (yellow card) 75'	Stadium: San Siro; Attendance: 20,783; Referee: Antonio Damato

3 February 2010 Semi-finals First leg	Internazionale	1–0	Fiorentina	Milan
20:45 CET	Milito 34'; Lúcio (yellow card) 81'	Report	Pasqual (yellow card) 68'; Gamberini (yellow card) 69'	Stadium: San Siro; Attendance: 15,000; Referee: Paolo Tagliavento

13 April 2010 Semi-finals Second leg	Fiorentina	0–1 (0–2 agg.)	Internazionale	Florence
20:45 CEST	Vargas (yellow card) 3'	Report	Córdoba (yellow card) 11'; Balotelli (yellow card) 28'; Motta (yellow card) 55'; Eto'o 57'; Chivu (yellow card) 59'	Stadium: Stadio Artemio Franchi; Attendance: 36,003; Referee: Nicola Rizzoli

5 May 2010 Final	Internazionale	1–0	Roma	Rome
20:45 CEST	Materazzi (yellow card) 35'; Milito 39'; Chivu (yellow card) 44'; Samuel (yellow card) 53'; Balotelli (yellow card) 87'	Report	Burdisso (yellow card) 14'; Perrotta (yellow card) 37'; Mexès (yellow card) 44'; Totti (yellow card) 63', (red card) 88'	Stadium: Stadio Olimpico; Attendance: 55,000; Referee: Nicola Rizzoli

=== UEFA Champions League ===
==== Group stage ====
Pos	Team	Pld	W	D	L	GF	GA	GD	Pts	Qualification
1	(Spain) Barcelona	6	3	2	1	7	3	+4	11	Advance to knockout phase
2	(Italy) Inter Milan	6	2	3	1	7	6	+1	9	Advance to knockout phase
3	(Russia) Rubin Kazan	6	1	3	2	4	7	−3	6	Transfer to Europa League
4	(Ukraine) Dynamo Kyiv	6	1	2	3	7	9	−2	5	

Source: RSSSF

16 September 2009 1	Internazionale (Italy)	0–0	(Spain) Barcelona	Milan, Italy
20:45 CEST (UTC+02:00)	Chivu (yellow card) 90'	Report	Henry (yellow card) 54'; Touré (yellow card) 83'	Stadium: San Siro; Attendance: 77,321; Referee: Wolfgang Stark (Germany)

29 September 2009 2	Rubin Kazan (Russia)	1–1	(Italy) Internazionale	Kazan, Russia
18:30 CEST (UTC+02:00)	Karadeniz (yellow card) 9'; Domínguez 11'	Report	Samuel (yellow card) 14'; Balotelli (yellow card) 20' (yellow-red card) 60'; Stanković 27'; Maicon (yellow card) 63'	Stadium: Central Stadium; Attendance: 23,670; Referee: Terje Hauge (Norway)

20 October 2009 3	Internazionale (Italy)	2–2	(Ukraine) Dynamo Kyiv	Milan, Italy
20:45 CEST (UTC+02:00)	Stanković (yellow card) 23', (goal) 35'; Maicon (yellow card) 29'; Samuel 47'; Chivu (yellow card) 52'; Zanetti (yellow card) 83'	Report	Mykhalyk 5'; Almeida (yellow card) 31'; Lúcio 40' (o.g.); Shevchenko (yellow card) 61'; Milevskyi (yellow card) 68'; Vukojević (yellow card) 82'	Stadium: San Siro; Attendance: 34,721; Referee: Martin Atkinson (England)

4 November 2009 4	Dynamo Kyiv (Ukraine)	1–2	(Italy) Internazionale	Kyiv, Ukraine
20:45 CET (UTC+01:00)	Shevchenko 21'; Almeida (yellow card) 28'; Mykhalyk (yellow card) 53'	Report	Samuel (yellow card) 23'; Lúcio (yellow card) 45'; Milito 86'; Sneijder 89'	Stadium: Lobanovsky Dynamo Stadium; Attendance: 15,900; Referee: Bertrand Layec (France)

24 November 2009 5	Barcelona (Spain)	2–0	(Italy) Internazionale	Barcelona, Spain
20:45 CET (UTC+01:00)	Piqué 10'; Pedro 26', (yellow card) 50'; Puyol (yellow card) 34'	Report	Motta (yellow card) 18'; Chivu (yellow card) 80'; Zanetti (yellow card) 89'	Stadium: Camp Nou; Attendance: 93,524; Referee: Massimo Busacca (Switzerland)

9 December 2009 6	Internazionale (Italy)	2–0	(Russia) Rubin Kazan	Milan, Italy
20:45 CET (UTC+01:00)	Eto'o 31'; Balotelli (yellow card) 46', (goal) 64'; Lúcio (yellow card) 69'	Report	Murawski (yellow card) 28'; Navas (yellow card) 43'	Stadium: San Siro; Attendance: 49,539; Referee: Pieter Vink (Netherlands)

==== Knockout phase ====
===== Round of 16 =====
24 February 2010 First leg	Internazionale (Italy)	2–1	(England) Chelsea	Milan, Italy
20:45 CET (UTC+01:00)	Milito 3', (yellow card) 22'; Motta (yellow card) 9'; Cambiasso 55'	Report	Kalou (yellow card) 23', (goal) 51'	Stadium: San Siro; Attendance: 78,971; Referee: Manuel Mejuto González (Spain)

16 March 2010 Second leg	Chelsea (England)	0–1 (1–3 agg.)	(Italy) Internazionale	London, England
20:45 CET (UTC+01:00)	Malouda (yellow card) 55'; Drogba (yellow card) 57' (yellow-red card) 87'; Alex (yellow card) 83'; Terry (yellow card) 89'	Report	Eto'o (yellow card) 17', (goal) 78'; Motta (yellow card) 48'; Lúcio (yellow card) 54'; Júlio César (yellow card) 82'	Stadium: Stamford Bridge; Attendance: 38,107; Referee: Wolfgang Stark (Germany)

===== Quarter-finals =====
31 March 2010 First leg	Internazionale (Italy)	1–0	(Russia) CSKA Moscow	Milan, Italy
20:45 CEST (UTC+02:00)	Materazzi (yellow card) 12'; Milito 65'	Report	Krasić (yellow card) 32'; Aldonin (yellow card) 37'	Stadium: San Siro; Attendance: 69,398; Referee: Howard Webb (England)

6 April 2010 Second leg	CSKA Moscow (Russia)	0–1 (0–2 agg.)	(Italy) Internazionale	Moscow, Russia
18:30 CEST (UTC+02:00)	Odiah (yellow card) 38' (yellow-red card) 49'; Mamayev (yellow card) 63'	Report	Sneijder 6'; Stanković (yellow card) 16'	Stadium: Luzhniki Stadium; Attendance: 54,400; Referee: Stéphane Lannoy (France)

===== Semi-finals =====
20 April 2010 First leg	Internazionale (Italy)	3–1	(Spain) Barcelona	Milan, Italy
20:45 CEST (UTC+02:00)	Eto'o (yellow card) 12'; Sneijder 30'; Maicon 48'; Milito 61'; Stanković (yellow card) 82'	Report	Pedro 19'; Busquets (yellow card) 45+1'; Puyol (yellow card) 51'; Piqué (yellow card) 60'; Keita (yellow card) 68'; Dani Alves (yellow card) 84'	Stadium: San Siro; Attendance: 79,609; Referee: Olegário Benquerença (Portugal)

28 April 2010 Second leg	Barcelona (Spain)	1–0 (2–3 agg.)	(Italy) Internazionale	Barcelona, Spain
20:45 CEST (UTC+02:00)	Pedro (yellow card) 27'; Piqué 84'	Report	Motta (yellow card) 10' (red card) 28'; Júlio César (yellow card) 34'; Chivu (yellow card) 43'; Lúcio (yellow card) 82'; Muntari (yellow card) 82'	Stadium: Camp Nou; Attendance: 96,214; Referee: Frank De Bleeckere (Belgium)

===== Final =====
22 May 2010 Final	Bayern Munich (Germany)	0–2	(Italy) Internazionale	Madrid, Spain
20:45 CEST (UTC+02:00)	Demichelis (yellow card) 26'; Van Bommel (yellow card) 78'	Report	Chivu (yellow card) 30'; Milito 35', 70'	Stadium: Santiago Bernabéu; Attendance: 80,354; Referee: Howard Webb (England)

== Statistics ==
=== Squad statistics ===
	Serie A	Champions League	Coppa Italia	Supercoppa Italiana	Total Stats
Games played	38	13	5	1	57
Games won	24	8	5	0	37
Games drawn	10	3	0	0	13
Games lost	4	2	0	1	7
Goals scored	75	17	6	1	99
Goals conceded	34	9	1	2	46
Goal difference	41	8	5	–1	53
Clean sheets	17	6	4	0	27
Goal by substitute	4	–	–	–	4
Total shots	–	–	–	–	–
Shots on target	–	–	–	–	–
Corners	–	–	–	–	–
Players used	26	23	22	14	–
Offsides	–	–	–	–	–
Fouls suffered	–	–	–	–	–
Fouls committed	–	–	–	–	–
Yellow cards	83	30	11	3	127
Red cards	7	2	1	–	10

Last updated: 22 May 2010
Source: Serie A statistics, UEFA Champions League statistics, Coppa Italia statistics

=== Players statistics ===
No.	Pos	Nat	Player	Total		Serie A		Coppa		Champions League	
No.	Pos	Nat	Player	Apps	Goals	Apps	Goals	Apps	Goals	Apps	Goals
12	GK	(Brazil) BRA	Julio Cesar	52	-43	38	-34	1	0	13	-9
13	DF	(Brazil) BRA	Maicon	50	7	33	6	4	0	13	1
6	DF	(Brazil) BRA	Lúcio	47	2	30+1	1	4	1	12	0
25	DF	(Argentina) ARG	Walter Samuel	41	4	25+3	3	0	0	13	1
26	DF	(Romania) ROU	Christian Chivu	31	1	16+4	1	2	0	7+2	0
4	MF	(Argentina) ARG	Javier Zanetti	53	0	37	0	3	0	13	0
19	MF	(Argentina) ARG	Esteban Cambiasso	45	4	26+4	3	3	0	11+1	1
10	MF	(Netherlands) NED	Wesley Sneijder	40	8	24+2	4	3	1	11	3
5	MF	(Serbia) SRB	Dejan Stankovic	42	5	24+5	3	1	0	8+4	2
22	FW	(Argentina) ARG	Diego Milito	50	29	33+2	22	4	1	11	6
9	FW	(Cameroon) CMR	Samuel Eto'o	46	15	27+5	12	1	1	13	2
1	GK	(Italy) ITA	Francesco Toldo	3	-1	0	0	3	-1	0	-0
8	MF	(Brazil) BRA	Thiago Motta	38	4	18+8	4	4	0	7+1	0
11	MF	(Ghana) GHA	Sulley Ali Muntari	40	2	16+11	2	4	0	2+7	0
2	DF	(Colombia) COL	Ivan Cordoba	24	0	15+6	0	1	0	0+2	0
45	FW	(Italy) ITA	Mario Balotelli	38	11	13+13	9	4	1	2+6	1
27	FW	(North Macedonia) MKD	Goran Pandev	27	3	13+6	3	2	0	5+1	0
39	DF	(Italy) ITA	Davide Santon	15	0	8+4	0	2	0	0+1	0
23	DF	(Italy) ITA	Marco Materazzi	19	0	7+5	0	3	0	1+3	0
14	MF	(France) FRA	Patrick Vieira	15	1	7+5	1	1	0	0+2	0
7	MF	(Portugal) POR	Ricardo Quaresma	13	0	3+8	0	0	0	0+2	0
17	MF	(Kenya) KEN	McDonald Mariga	13	0	3+5	0	2	0	0+3	0
15	MF	(Slovenia) SLO	Rene Krhin	5	0	1+4	0	0	0	0	0
21	GK	(Italy) ITA	Paolo Orlandoni	0	0	0	0	0	0	0	0
29	DF	(Italy) ITA	Giulio Donati	1	0	0	0	1	0	0	0
28	MF	(Switzerland) SUI	Alen Stevanovic	2	0	0+1	0	1	0	0	0
30	MF	(Brazil) BRA	Amantino Mancini	7	0	1+5	0	0	0	1	0
18	FW	(Honduras) HON	David Suazo	2	0	0+1	0	0	0	0+1	0
89	FW	(Austria) AUT	Marko Arnautovic	3	0	0+3	0	0	0	0	0
-	MF	(Italy) ITA	Lorenzo Crisetig	0	0	0	0	0	0	0	0
-	FW	(Romania) ROU	Denis Alibec	0	0	0	0	0	0	0	0
-	MF	(Sweden) SWE	Sebastian Carlsén	0	0	0	0	0	0	0	0

=== Minutes played ===
				Total						Serie A					Champions League					Coppa Italia					Supercoppa Italiana				
Country	N	P	Name	GS	A	Mins.	Gls.	Y	R	A	Mins.	Gls.	Y	R	A	Mins.	Gls.	Y	R	A	Mins.	Gls.	Y	R	A	Mins.	Gls.	Y	R
(Brazil)	12	GK	Júlio César	50	52	4780	-42	2		38	3443	-31			12	1144	-9	2		1	97				1	96	-2		
(Brazil)	13	DF	Maicon	47	48	4477	7	12	1	31	2960	6	8	1	12	1123	1	2		4	298		1		1	96		1	
(Brazil)	6	DF	Lúcio	46	47	4427	2	10	1	31	2901	1	5	1	11	1048		4		4	382	1	1		1	96			
(Argentina)	25	DF	Samuel	35	38	3214	4	12	1	26	2166	3	10	1	12	1048	1	2											
(Romania)	26	DF	Chivu	25	30	2314	1	13		19	1449	1	7		8	578		4		2	191		1		1	96		1	
(Argentina)	4	MF	J. Zanetti	51	51	4877		6		35	3349		4		12	1144		2		3	288				1	96			
(Argentina)	19	MF	Cambiasso	37	43	3401	3	3		28	2241	2	3		11	877	1			3	187				1	96			
(Netherlands)	10	MF	Sneijder	36	38	3141	8	4	2	25	1960	4	4	2	10	898	3			3	283	1							
(Serbia)	5	MF	Stanković	33	40	3047	5	14		27	2113	3	10		11	769	2	3		1	94		1		1	71			
(Argentina)	22	FW	Milito	43	48	3998	25	3		33	2850	20	2		10	877	4	1		4	175	1			1	96			
(Cameroon)	9	FW	Eto'o	39	44	3714	16	7		30	2440	12	5		12	1111	2	2		1	67	1			1	96	1		
(Italy)	1	GK	Toldo	3	3	285	-1													3	285	-1							
(Brazil)	8	MF	Motta	27	37	2379	4	12	1	24	1406	4	7		8	605		4	1	4	297		1		1	71			
(Italy)	45	FW	Balotelli	17	37	2010	10	9	1	24	1365	8	6		8	292	1	2	1	4	328	1	1		1	25			
(Ghana)	11	MF	Muntari	22	39	1803	1	10	1	26	1229	1	8	1	8	235		1		4	254				1	85		1	
(Colombia)	2	DF	Córdoba	16	24	1646		5	1	21	1455		4	1	2	94				1	97		1						
(North Macedonia)	27	FW	Pandev	18	24	1575	3	2		17	1129	3	2		5	318				2	128								
(Italy)	39	DF	Santon	10	15	1009				12	806				1	12				2	191								
(Italy)	23	DF	Materazzi	9	16	917		3		10	521		2		3	108		1		3	288								
(France)	14	MF	Vieira	8	16	821	1	3		12	679	1	3		2	23				1	94				1	25			
(Portugal)	7	MF	Quaresma	3	13	481		1		11	435		1		2	46													
(Kenya)	17	MF	Mariga	3	12	394	1	1		7	359	1	1		3	18				2	17								
(Slovenia)	15	MF	Krhin	1	5	82				5	82																		
(Italy)	21	GK	Orlandoni																										
(Italy)	29	DF	Donati	1	1	84														1	84								
(Serbia)	28	MF	Stevanović		1	28				1	28																		
(Brazil)	30	MF	Mancini	2	7	235				6	170				1	65													
(Honduras)	18	FW	Suazo	1	4	158				1	21				1	49				1	77				1	11			
(Austria)	89	FW	Arnautović		3	72				3	72																		

Last updated: 2 May 2010
Source: F.C. Internazionale Milano Official Website
Ordered by position on pitch (from back to front)
0 shown as blank
Country: when 2 flags, 1st flag = country that plays for internationally, 2nd flag = country of birth; N = number on jersey; P = Position; Name = Name on jersey (for more extended name, pause the mouse pointer on the name); GS = Game Started; A = Appearances.

=== Goalscorers ===
Rank	No.	Pos.	Name	Serie A	Coppa Italia	Supercoppa Italiana	Champions League	Total
1	22	FW	(Argentina) Diego Milito	22	2	0	6	30
2	9	FW	(Cameroon) Samuel Eto'o	12	1	1	2	16
3	45	FW	(Italy) Mario Balotelli	9	1	0	1	11
4	10	MF	(Netherlands) Wesley Sneijder	4	1	0	3	8
5	13	DF	(Brazil) Maicon	6	0	0	1	7
6	5	MF	(Serbia) Dejan Stanković	3	0	0	2	5
7	5	MF	(Brazil) Thiago Motta	4	0	0	0	4
7	19	MF	(Argentina) Esteban Cambiasso	3	0	0	1	4
7	25	DF	(Argentina) Walter Samuel	3	0	0	1	4
10	27	FW	(North Macedonia) Goran Pandev	3	0	0	0	3
11	6	DF	(Brazil) Lúcio	1	1	0	0	2
12	11	MF	(Ghana) Sulley Muntari	1	0	0	0	1
12	14	MF	(France) Patrick Vieira	1	0	0	0	1
12	17	MF	(Kenya) McDonald Mariga	1	0	0	0	1
12	26	DF	(Romania) Cristian Chivu	1	0	0	0	1
Own goals				1	0	0	0	1
Totals				75	6	1	17	99

=== Disciplinary record ===
N	Pos.	Nat.	Name	Yellow card	Second yellow card	Red card	Notes
5	CM	(Serbia)	Stanković	14	0	0	
26	LB	(Romania)	Chivu	14	0	0	
25	CB	(Argentina)	Samuel	13	1	0	
8	DM	(Brazil)	Motta	12	0	1	
45	FW	(Italy)	Balotelli	11	1	0	
13	RB	(Brazil)	Maicon	11	0	1	
6	CB	(Brazil)	Lúcio	10	1	0	
11	CM	(Ghana)	Muntari	10	1	0	
9	FW	(Cameroon)	Eto'o	7	0	0	
4	CM	(Argentina)	J. Zanetti	6	0	0	
2	CB	(Colombia)	Córdoba	5	1	0	
10	AM	(Netherlands)	Sneijder	4	1	1	
23	CB	(Italy)	Materazzi	4	0	0	
19	DM	(Argentina)	Cambiasso	3	0	0	
14	DM	(France)	Vieira	3	0	0	
22	FW	(Argentina)	Milito	3	0	0	
12	GK	(Brazil)	Júlio César	2	0	0	
27	FW	(North Macedonia)	Pandev	2	0	0	
17	CM	(Kenya)	Mariga	1	0	0	
7	AM	(Portugal)	Quaresma	1	0	0	
1	GK	(Italy)	Toldo	1	0	0	

Last updated: 17 May 2010
Only competitive matches
(yellow card) = Number of bookings; (second yellow card) = Number of sending offs after a second yellow card; (red card) = Number of sending offs by a direct red card..
