= Charles Toppin (Worcestershire cricketer) =

English cricketer

Personal information
- Full name: Charles Graham Toppin
- Born: 17 April 1906; Great Malvern, Worcestershire
- Died: 20 May 1972 (aged 66); Leamington Spa, Warwickshire
- Nickname: Tim
- Batting: Right-handed
- Bowling: Right-arm off-break

Domestic team information
- Years: Team
- 1927–1928: Worcestershire
- FC debut: 23 July 1927 Worcestershire v Lancashire
- Last FC: 13 July 1928 Worcestershire v Lancashire

Career statistics
Competition	First-class
Matches	4
Runs scored	17
Batting average	3.40
100s/50s	0/0
Top score	10
Catches/stumpings	0/–
- Source: Cricketarchive, 13 September 2007

Charles Graham "Tim" Toppin (17 April 1906 – 20 May 1972) was an English first-class cricketer who played in four matches for Worcestershire in the late 1920s.

Toppin was educated at Malvern College in Worcestershire. He was blinded in one eye by a blow from a cricket ball when he was 14.

A hard-hitting batsman, Toppin scored only 17 runs in his four games for Worcestershire, but had a long and successful club cricket career for Blackheath, The Arabs, Old Malvernians and other clubs. He appeared in a single-innings 12-a-side match for Blackheath against the touring Indians in 1932.

A number of his relatives played first-class cricket. His father, also Charles, played for Cambridge University in the 1880s; three uncles (Arthur Day, Sam Day and Sydney Day) played for Kent; his brother John Toppin appeared once for Worcestershire; and his brother-in-law Basil Brooke had two games for the Royal Navy.
