= John Toppin =

English cricketer

Cricket information
- Batting: Right-handed
- Bowling: Right-arm medium-fast

Career statistics
Competition	First-class
Matches	1
Runs scored	8
Batting average	4.00
100s/50s	0/0
Top score	6
Balls bowled	12
Wickets	0
Bowling average	–
5 wickets in innings	0
10 wickets in match	0
Best bowling	–
Catches/stumpings	0/–
- Source: Cricinfo, 29 May 2017

John Fallowfield Townsend Toppin (25 February 1900 – 22 November 1965) was an English first-class cricketer who played in one match for Worcestershire against Lancashire at Old Trafford in 1920. He scored 2 and 6, and bowled two overs without reward.

Toppin was born in Great Malvern, Worcestershire and attended Winchester School, playing for the cricket XI there. He died aged 65 in Ascot, Berkshire.

A number of his relations played first-class cricket. His father, Charles Toppin, played 25 times (mostly for Cambridge University) in the late 19th century; his brother, also named Charles, played a few games for Worcestershire in the late 1920s; while three uncles — Arthur Day, Sam Day and Sydney Day — had careers of varying lengths with Kent.

He also played association football as a forward for the Corinthian club, for whom he scored 28 goals in 38 appearances.
