= Davide Sancinito =

Italian footballer (born 1987)

Personal information
- Date of birth: 4 September 1987 (age 39)
- Place of birth: Albenga, Italy
- Height: 1.85 m (6 ft 1 in)
- Position: Midfielder

Team information
- Current team: Imperia

Youth career
- 2011–2012: Ceriale Cisano
- 2012–2013: Finale

Senior career*
Years	Team	Apps	(Gls)
2013–2015	Vado Ligure	77	(14)
2015–2016	Sanremese		
2016–2019	Albissola	39	(3)
2019	Sestri Levante	11	(1)
2019–	Imperia	0	(0)
- * Club domestic league appearances and goals as of 21:33, 2 October 2019 (UTC)

Davide Sancinito (born 4 September 1987) is an Italian footballer who plays as a midfielder for Serie D side A.S.D. Imperia.

== Club career ==
Sancinito started his career in smaller youth teams, his first major team was Serie D side Vado Ligure, where he played between 2013 and 2015. he spent half year at Eccellenza side Sanremese, then on the summer of 2016 he signed to Albissola 2010 on the same tier. The team promoted immediately to the Serie D, then Serie C. He made his professional debut on 19 September 2018, in the first round of 2018–19 Serie C against Olbia Calcio 1905. On 31 January 2019, he signed to Serie D side Sestri Levante.

Ahed of the 2019–20 season, Sancinito joined A.S.D. Imperia.
