= Toppan (surname) =

Toppan is a surname. Notable people with the surname include:

- Gianni Toppan (1920–1987), Italian footballer
- Jane Toppan (1854–1938), American serial killer, "Jolly Jane"
- Juri Toppan (born 1990), Italian footballer

== See also ==
- Toppin
