= Rodrigue Boisfer =

French footballer (born 1981)

Personal information
- Date of birth: 24 January 1981 (age 45)
- Place of birth: Marseille, France
- Height: 1.75 m (5 ft 9 in)
- Position: Midfielder

Youth career
- Monaco
- 1998–1999: Genoa

Senior career*
Years	Team	Apps	(Gls)
1999–2009	Genoa	106	(2)
2005	→ Venezia (loan)	1	(0)
2005–2006	→ Perugia (loan)	29	(0)
2006–2007	→ Sangiovannese (loan)	18	(0)
2007–2009	→ Pro Sesto (loan)	62	(4)
2009–2014	Gubbio	139	(7)
2014–2016	Sestri Levante	85	(6)
2016–2017	Rapallo Ruentes 1914		
Total		440	(19)

Managerial career
- 2017–2019: Entella Giovanili
- 2025: Vado
- 2026–: Arenzano
- * Club domestic league appearances and goals

Rodrigue Boisfer (born 24 January 1981) is a French football coach and former footballer who is currently as a head coach for Arenzano.

== Career ==
=== Genoa ===
Born in Marseille, Boisfer started his career at Monegasque club AS Monaco FC. He then left for Italian Serie B club Genoa. He made his Serie B debut on 5 Match 1999, replacing Alessandro Manetti in the second half. After not playing in 2004–05 Serie B, in January 2005 he left for Venezia.

==== false accounting scandal ====
He also sold to Udinese along with Valon Behrami in exchanged with Mohammed Gargo and Vittorio Micolucci, all in co-ownership deal in January 2004. In June, except Micolucci, all players returned to/signed outright by Genoa. Despite a player exchange, it made both club had a profit but in terms of the asset value of the new signing, as the players (such as youth products) now had a high nominal asset value on the account. After June transactions, Genoa still made a paper "profit" but the flopped contract value of the player, made Genoa had to amortize in the future, effectively borrowed future revenue to 2003–04 account, It called "plusvalenze fittizie" by Italian. In 2008 Geona was fined €400,000 for inflating youth players transfers and accused for other false accounting.

==== Lega Pro loans ====
Genoa failed to find a club to buy Boisfer outright for the price equal to or higher than the accounting value (over €4 million), his contract was extended and left on loan to Serie C1 in the next few seasons. Genoa also hit by Caso Genoa which saw Genoa from Serie B champion in 2005 to relegated to Serie C1 for manipulate the result of Venezia–Genoa in 2004–05 Serie B, where Boisfer spent 5 1/2 months.

In 2005–06 Serie C1, he left for Perugia along with Patrice Feussi and Antonio Ghomsi. In 2006–07 Serie C1 he played for Sangiovannese. In 2007–08 Serie C1 he left for Pro Sesto along with Paolo Facchinetti. He remained in Pro Sesto in 2008–09 Lega Pro Prima Divisione and in 2009–10 Lega Pro Seconda Divisione left on loan to Gubbio.

Despite Boisfer was left on loan, it still costed Geona €391,111 in 2009 financial year as amortization and had a residual value of €782,2222 on 30 June 2009. He had a contract until 30 June 2011.

=== Gubbio ===
In 2009, he left for Gubbio along with Eugenio Lamanna, winning the promotion play-off to Prima Divisione. In the next season Gubbio signed Antonio Caracciolo and later Silvano Raggio Garibaldi from Genoa, Boisfer himself also joined Gubbio for €15,000 on 11 August 2010. He won the promotion again as 2010–11 Lega Pro Prima Divisione Group A champion. In July 2011 he renewed his contract with Gubbio. On 16 January 2012 Boisfer extended his contract again to 30 June 2013.

== Honours ==
- Lega Pro Prima Divisione: 2011
