= Toppi =

Toppi may refer to:

- Francesco Saverio Toppi, Italian archbishop (1925-2007)
- Giove Toppi, Italian cartoonist (1888-1942)
- Sergio Toppi, Italian illustrator and comics creator (1932-2012)

== See also ==
Toppin, surname list
