= Daniele Pedrelli =

Italian footballer (born 1988)

Personal information
- Date of birth: 16 May 1988 (age 38)
- Place of birth: Fivizzano, Italy
- Height: 1.82 m (6 ft 0 in)
- Positions: Left-back; left winger

Team information
- Current team: USD Montagnano 1966

Youth career
- 1995–2000: Fivizzanese
- 2000–2003: FoCe Vara
- 2003–2007: Spezia
- 2007: → Inter (loan)
- 2007–2008: Internazionale

Senior career*
Years	Team	Apps	(Gls)
2007–2011	Inter	0	(0)
2008–2009	→ Treviso (loan)	14	(0)
2009–2010	→ Cesena (loan)	19	(0)
2010–2011	→ Spezia (loan)	25	(1)
2011–2012	Spezia	11	(0)
2012	Carrarese	15	(0)
2013	Pisa 1909	12	(0)
2013–2014	Virtus Entella	18	(0)
2014–2015	Olhanense	35	(2)
2015–2016	Ancona	27	(4)
2016–2017	Reggiana	7	(0)
2017–2019	Gubbio	39	(0)
2019–2020	Vis Pesaro	18	(0)
2020	Pianese	4	(0)
2020–2023	Sansepolcro		
2023–2025	Baldaccio Bruni Calcio		
2025–	USD Montagnano 1966		
- * Club domestic league appearances and goals as of 14 February 2026

Daniele Pedrelli (born 16 May 1988) is an Italian footballer who plays as a left back for USD Montagnano 1966.

== Career ==
Born in Fivizzano, Tuscany, Pedrelli started his career at hometown club Fivizzanese, then moved to FoCe Vara of the Province of La Spezia, Liguria, about 30 km away. He then played at Spezia. He was promoted from Allievi Nazionali under-17 Team to Berretti under-20 Team in 2005. Since Spazia promoted to Serie B in 2006, their Berretti team changed to play at Campionato Primavera. In January 2007, he joined Internazionale's Primavera Team on loan. He won the champion that season. In July 2007, he signed a 4-year professional contract with Inter. In exchange, Inter loaned a few players to the friendly club. Pedrelli has played a few friendlies with Inter first team in 2007–08 season.

After Inter bought some players from another friendly club Treviso in June 2008, Primavera under-20 team teammate Pedrelli (50% valued for €275,000) and Gianluca Litteri were sold to Treviso in co-ownership deal in July. He played 18 league matches for the Serie B struggler. In June 2009, few weeks before the bankrupt of Treviso, Inter bought back Pedrelli, and allowed Federico Piovaccari joined Treviso permanently.

In July 2009, he left for Serie B newcomer Cesena on loan with option to purchase. On 7 July 2010, he was loaned to newly promoted Prima Divisione side Spezia from Internazionale with option to purchase 50% registration rights. He was the second left back signed by Spezia that season, behind Juri Toppan who signed from Inter. However Pedrelli was the starting defender with 26 starts in 2010–11 Lega Pro Prima Divisione. Pedrelli was a backup in 2011–12 Lega Pro Prima Divisione season.

In June 2012 Inter gave up the remain registration rights by not submitting a bid.

On 30 July 2012 he left for Carrarese. In the summer of 2013 he moved to Virtus Entella. The following year he emigrated to Portugal where he will play for a season, in Olhanense. In the season 15-16 plays to Ancona. On 5 July 2016, he joined Reggiana for free.

On 12 July 2019, he signed a 1-year contract with Vis Pesaro. On 31 January 2020, he moved to Pianese.

== Honours ==
Spezia

- Supercoppa di Lega di Prima Divisione: 2012
- Lega Pro Prima Divisione: 2011–12
- Coppa Italia Lega Pro: 2011–12

Cesena

- Serie B runner-up: 2009–10 (promotion to Serie A)
