= Lopy =

Lopy is a surname. Notable people with the surname include:

- Dion Lopy (born 2002), Senegalese football player
- Joseph Lopy (born 1992), Senegalese football player

== See also ==
- Lopy Island, Alaska
