= Alessandro Bianchi =

Alessandro Bianchi may refer to:

- Alessandro Bianchi (footballer, born 1966), Italian international footballer
- Alessandro Bianchi (footballer, born 1989), San Marino international footballer
- Alessandro Bianchi (politician, born 1945), Italian politician, professor and urban planner
- Alessandro Bianchi (politician, born 1965), Italian politician
