= Suhayb Al-Kharusi =

Omani footballer (born 2006)

Personal information
- Full name: Suhayb bin Al-Salt Al-Kharusi
- Date of birth: 1 April 2006 (age 20)
- Place of birth: Muscat, Oman
- Height: 1.78 m (5 ft 10 in)
- Position: Midfielder

Team information
- Current team: Sestri Levante (on loan from Genoa)
- Number: 65

Youth career
- –2017: Muscat Academy
- 2017–2020: Lombardia Uno
- 2020–2022: Virtus Entella
- 2022–2026: Genoa

Senior career*
Years	Team	Apps	(Gls)
2026–	Genoa	0	(0)
2026–	→ Sestri Levante (loan)	0	(0)
- * Club domestic league appearances and goals as of 20:15, 9 July 2026 (UTC)

Suhayb Al-Kharusi (born 1 April 2006) is an Omani professional footballer who plays for Sestri Levante on loan from Serie A club Genoa.

== Club career ==
Al-Kharusi started his career with the Muscat Academy before moving to Italy at age eleven to join the Lombardia Uno Academy, an affiliate of AC Milan. In 2020, he moved to Virtus Entella of Serie C after impressing a number of clubs during his time at Lombardia Uno. In 2022, he joined the academy of Genoa CFC after training with the club for several years. He would eventually become captain of his youth sides.

After progressing through the Genoa's academy, Al-Kharusi joined its Campionato Primavera 1 side for the 2024/2025 season. He made twenty-eight appearances for the club during his first season. Al-Kharusi signed a three-year contract with the first team in June 2026. In the process, he became the first-ever Omani player to sign for a Serie A club. In August 2026, Al-Kharusi was loaned to US Sestri Levante 1919 of Serie D.

== International career ==
In May 2024, Al-Kharusi was called up to the Oman national under-20 football team for the first time for friendlies against Iraq, Kuwait, and Bahrain in preparation for the 2024 WAFF U-19 Championship and 2025 AFC U-20 Asian Cup qualification.
