= Charles Toppin =

Charles Toppin may refer to:

- Charles Toppin (Cambridge University cricketer) (1864–1928), English cricketer who also played for the Gentlemen and MCC
- Charles Toppin (Worcestershire cricketer) (1906–1972), English cricketer, son of the above
