= Gabriel Nunes =

Brazilian footballer (born 1994)

Personal information
- Full name: Gabriel Nunes da Cunha
- Date of birth: 11 July 1994 (age 32)
- Place of birth: Andradina, Brazil
- Height: 1.86 m (6 ft 1 in)
- Position: Midfielder

Team information
- Current team: Imperia
- Number: 7

Youth career
- 2012: Comercial
- 2013: Cruzeiro

Senior career*
Years	Team	Apps	(Gls)
2014	ABC		
2014	Botafogo SP		
2015	Sertãozinho	7	(1)
2015	Paulista		
2016	Audax	7	(0)
2016	Bragantino	4	(0)
2017	Capivariano	10	(0)
2017–2018	Boavista B	13	(3)
2018–2019	Boavista	2	(0)
2019	América RN	6	(1)
2020	Padova	2	(0)
2020–2021	Siena	12	(0)
2021–2022	Trento	37	(3)
2022	Casertana	3	(0)
2022–2023	Cjarlins Muzane	19	(4)
2023–2025	Treviso	61	(2)
2025	UniPomezia 1938	10	(3)
2025–2026	Nocerina	15	(1)
2026–	Imperia	0	(0)
- * Club domestic league appearances and goals as of 10 November 2026

Gabriel Nunes da Cunha (born 11 July 1994), known as Gabriel Nunes, is a Brazilian footballer who plays as midfielder for Italian Serie D club Imperia.

== Club career ==
On 26 February 2020, he signed with Italian Serie C club Padova until the end of the 2019–20 season, with the club holding an option to renew the contract.

On 7 July 2022, Nunes moved to Casertana in Serie D.

== Career statistics ==
As of match played 31 October 2021

Appearances and goals by club, season and competition
Club	Season	League			State League		National cup		League cup		Other		Total	
Club	Season	Division	Apps	Goals	Apps	Goals	Apps	Goals	Apps	Goals	Apps	Goals	Apps	Goals
ABC	2014	Série B	—		0	0	—		—		—		0	0
Botafogo–SP	2014	Paulista	—		—		—		—		18 (Note: All appearance(s) in Copa Paulista)	1	18	1
Sertãozinho	2015	Paulista A3	—		7	1	—		—		—		7	1
Paulista	2015	Paulista A2	—		—		—		—		11	4	11	4
Audax	2016	Série D	3	0	4	0	—		—		—		7	0
Bragantino	2016	Série B	4	0	—		—		—		—		4	0
Capivariano	2017	Paulista A2	—		10	0	—		—		—		10	0
Boavista	2018–19	Primeira Liga	2	0	—		2	0	1	0	—		5	0
América RN	2019	Potiguar 1	—		6	1	—		—		—		6	1
Padova	2019–20	Serie C	0	0	—		—		—		2 (Note: All appearance(s) in Serie C Promotion)	0	2	0
Siena	2020–21	Serie D	12	0	—		—		—		—		12	0
Trento	2020–21	Serie D	14	2	—		—		—		—		14	2
Trento	2021–22	Serie C	8	0	—		—		3	0	—		11	0
Trento	Career total		22	2	13	1	0	0	0	0	0	0	25	2
Career total			43	2	27	1	2	0	4	0	31	5	107	9
