= Matteo Lombardo =

Italian footballer

Personal information
- Date of birth: 6 March 1985 (age 41)
- Place of birth: Sesto San Giovanni, Italy
- Height: 1.80 m (5 ft 11 in)
- Position: Midfielder

Youth career
- ?–2004: Pro Sesto
- 2003–2004: → Internazionale (loan)
- 2004–2005: Internazionale

Senior career*
Years	Team	Apps	(Gls)
2005–2010	Internazionale	0	(0)
2006–2007	→ Pistoiese (loan)	9	(0)
2007–2008	→ PortoSummaga (loan)	1	(0)
2008	→ Caravaggese (loan)	3	(0)
2008–2009	→ Legnano (co-ownership)	25	(1)
2009–2010	→ Villacidrese (loan)	29	(2)
Total		67	(2)
- * Club domestic league appearances and goals

Matteo Lombardo (born 6 March 1985) is an Italian former footballer who played as a midfielder.

== Career ==
Born in Sesto San Giovanni, a comune within Milan metropolitan area, Lombardo started his career at hometown club Pro Sesto. He joined Internazionale in 2003 and in 2004 became permanent deal. In February 2005 he had an operation on his right ankle. In the next season he was awarded no.39 shirt of the first team but only able to play for the first team in club friendly. He also scored 3 goals in regular season for the Primavera under-20 team in 2005–06 season, as overage player, which he was the team top-scorer in previous season with just 5 goals.

In mid-2006 he was loaned to Serie C1 side Pistoiese. In the next season he moved to Portogruaro Summaga and Caravaggese in January 2008. In July he moved to Legnano in co-ownership deal for €500. Lombardo made a breakthrough that season, played 25 times. At the end of season both club failed to agree a price and Inter submitted a higher price (around €500) to Lega Calcio to out bid Legnano on 26 June 2009. In August 2009 he was loaned to Villacidrese along with teammate Juri Toppan.
