= Toppin =

Toppin is a surname. Notable people with the surname include:

- Aubrey Toppin (1881–1969), English officer of arms
- Charles Toppin (disambiguation), multiple people
- Dexter Toppin (born 1957), South African cricketer
- Edgar Toppin (1928–2004), American historian
- Jacob Toppin (born 2000), American basketball player
- John Toppin (1900–1965), English cricketer
- Jovon Toppin (born 1989), Trinidadian sprinter
- Obi Toppin (born 1998), American basketball player
- Rupe Toppin (born 1941), Panamanian baseball player
