= Eccellenza Liguria =

- Organising body: Lega Nazionale Dilettanti
- Founded: 1991
- Country: Italy
- Confederation: UEFA
- Divisions: 1
- Number of clubs: 16
- Promotion to: Serie D
- Relegation to: Promozione Liguria
- League cup: Coppa Italia Dilettanti
- Current champions: Millesimo (2025–26)
- Most championships: Imperia, Sanremese, Sestrese, Vado, Virtus Entella (3 titles each)
- Website: www.lnd.it

Eccellenza Liguria is the regional Eccellenza football division for clubs in the northern Italian region of Liguria. It consists of 16 teams competing in one group. The winning team is promoted to Serie D, the top level of Italian amateur football. The club that finishes second may also gain promotion by taking part in a two-round national play-off.

== Champions ==
The past champions of Eccellenza Liguria were:

- 1991–92 Sanremese
- 1992–93 Migliarinese
- 1993–94 Sestrese
- 1994–95 Pontedecimo
- 1995–96 Sanremese
- 1996–97 Entella Chiavari
- 1997–98 Sestrese
- 1998–99 Entella Chiavari
- 1999–00 Savona
- 2000–01 Vado
- 2001–02 Lavagnese
- 2002–03 Fo.Ce. Vara
- 2003–04 Loanesi S.Francesco
- 2004–05 Sestri Levante
- 2005–06 Imperia
- 2006–07 Sestrese
- 2007–08 Virtus Entella
- 2008–09 Borgorosso Arenzano
- 2009–10 Sanremese
- 2010–11 Bogliasco
- 2011–12 Sestri Levante
- 2012–13 Vado
- 2013–14 Argentina
- 2014–15 Ligorna
- 2015–16 FBC Finale
- 2016–17 Albissola
- 2017–18 Fezzanese
- 2018–19 Vado
- 2019–20 Imperia
- 2020–21 Ligorna
- 2021–22 Fezzanese
- 2022–23 Albenga
- 2023–24 Imperia
- 2024–25 Celle Varazze
- 2025–26 Millesimo
