= Falou Samb =

Senegalese footballer

Personal information
- Date of birth: 17 January 1997 (age 29)
- Place of birth: Dakar, Senegal
- Height: 1.96 m (6 ft 5 in)
- Position: Forward

Team information
- Current team: Imperia
- Number: 77

Youth career
- 2013–2014: Atletico Uri
- 2014–2015: Tor Tre Teste
- 2015–2016: Genoa

Senior career*
| Years | Team | Apps | (Gls) |
| 2016–2018 | Genoa | 0 | (0) |
| 2016 | → Mantova (loan) | 13 | (1) |
| 2016 | → Siracusa (loan) | 0 | (0) |
| 2016–2017 | → Ancona (loan) | 21 | (3) |
| 2017–2018 | → Ravenna (loan) | 15 | (3) |
| 2018 | → Reggina (loan) | 7 | (0) |
| 2018–2019 | Mosta | 3 | (0) |
| 2019 | Avezzano | 11 | (3) |
| 2019–2020 | Blois | 12 | (4) |
| 2020–2021 | Sedan | 5 | (1) |
| 2021–2022 | Al-Kawkab | | |
| 2022–2023 | Atletico Uri | 21 | (3) |
| 2023 | Derthona | 15 | (2) |
| 2023–2024 | United Riccione | 17 | (6) |
| 2024–2025 | Real Acerrana | 29 | (4) |
| 2025–2026 | Acireale | 28 | (8) |
| 2026– | Imperia | 0 | (0) |
- * Club domestic league appearances and goals as of 10 November 2026

Falou Samb (born 17 January 1997) is a Senegalese professional footballer who plays as a forward for Italian Serie D club Imperia.

== Career ==
Samb made his Serie C debut for Mantova on 6 February 2016 in a game against Cremonese.

On 30 July 2018, he moved from Italy to Malta, signing a two-year contract with Mosta. He left the club to join Italian club Avezzano on 11 January 2019. After only four months, Samb's contract was terminated by mutual consent.

In the summer 2019, Samb joined French club Blois.
