= Richie Musaba =

Dutch footballer (born 2000)

Personal information
- Full name: Richie Ephraim Musaba
- Date of birth: 6 December 2000 (age 25)
- Place of birth: Beuningen, Netherlands
- Height: 1.82 m (6 ft 0 in)
- Position: Midfielder

Team information
- Current team: Imperia
- Number: 26

Youth career
- 2006–2009: VV Ewijk
- 2009–2011: NEC
- 2011–2013: NEC Amateurs
- 2013–2018: Vitesse

Senior career*
Years	Team	Apps	(Gls)
2017–2019	Jong Vitesse	28	(7)
2018–2020	Vitesse	1	(1)
2020–2023	Fortuna Sittard	7	(0)
2020–2021	→ Dordrecht (loan)	36	(6)
2022	→ TOP Oss (loan)	4	(0)
2024–2025	Levadia	60	(15)
2026	AS Trenčín	6	(0)
2026–	Imperia	0	(0)
- * Club domestic league appearances and goals as of 10 November 2026

Richie Ephraim Musaba (born 6 December 2000) is a Dutch professional footballer who plays as a midfielder for Italian Serie D club Imperia.

== Career ==
On 12 May 2019, Musaba made his professional debut with Vitesse in a 6–1 Eredivisie win against De Graafschap, coming on as a substitute for Navarone Foor in the 82nd minute and scoring his team's last goal minutes later.

After failing to break through at Vitesse, he joined Fortuna Sittard on 4 September 2020 on a two-year contract, who sent him on a one-season loan to second-tier side FC Dordrecht on the same day. He made his debut for Dordrecht on 7 September in a 2–1 loss to FC Den Bosch, coming on as a substitute in the 88th minute for Kevin Jansen.

On 29 July 2022, Musaba was loaned to TOP Oss. His loan spell was unsuccessful, and he made only four appearances for the club in the first half of the season before returning prematurely to Fortuna in January 2023. In March 2023, the club announced the formal termination of his contract in accordance with regulations, which meant that he was set to leave Fortuna at the end of the season.

Musaba moved to Italian club Imperia, playing in Serie D, in August 2026.

== Personal life ==
Musaba was born to Congolese parents. His twin brother Anthony is also a professional footballer.
