= David Day (cricketer) =

English cricketer and British Army officer

Personal information
- Full name: David Arthur Sydney Day
- Born: 30 March 1916; Greenwich, Kent, England
- Died: 22 February 1944 (aged 27); Arakan Division, British Burma
- Batting: Unknown
- Bowling: Unknown
- Relatives: Arthur Day (father); Sydney Day (uncle); Samuel Day (uncle); Anthony Day (cousin)

Domestic team information
- Years: Team
- 1940/41: Europeans

Career statistics
Competition	First-class
Matches	1
Runs scored	3
Batting average	1.50
100s/50s	–/–
Top score	3
Balls bowled	12
Wickets	0
Bowling average	–
5 wickets in innings	–
10 wickets in match	–
Best bowling	–
Catches/stumpings	–/–
- Source: ESPNcricinfo, 19 January 2021

David Arthur Sydney Day (30 March 1916 – 22 February 1944) was an English first-class cricketer and British Army officer.

The son of the cricketer Arthur Day, he was born at Greenwich in March 1916. He was educated at Tonbridge School. He served in the Second World War, being commissioned as a second lieutenant in the Wiltshire Regiment December 1939, before gaining the rank of lieutenant in July 1943. He served in British India in the war, where he made one appearance in first-class cricket for the Europeans cricket team against the Indians at Madras in January 1941. Batting twice in the match, he was dismissed for 3 runs in the Europeans first innings by C. R. Rangachari, while in their second innings he was dismissed without scoring by the same bowler. Later in the war he had risen to the rank of temporary captain. He was killed in action during the Battle of the Admin Box in the Arakan Division of British Burma on 22 February 1944. His uncles Sydney and Samuel Day both played first-class cricket, as did his cousin Anthony Day.
