= Augustinas Klimavičius =

Lithuanian footballer

Augustinas Klimavicius
Personal information
- Date of birth: 27 April 2001 (age 25)
- Place of birth: Kaunas, Lithuania
- Height: 1.91 m (6 ft 3 in)
- Position: Centre-forward

Team information
- Current team: Sestri Levante
- Number: 19

Youth career
- –2016: Pro Sesto
- 2016–2022: Genoa
- 2018–2019: → Spezia (loan)
- 2020: → Torino (loan)
- 2020–2021: → Empoli (loan)

Senior career*
Years	Team	Apps	(Gls)
2019	Genoa	0	(0)
2022–2023	Hegelmann	28	(7)
2024–2025	FA Šiauliai	31	(4)
2025–	Sestri Levante	27	(12)

International career^{‡}
2017	Lithuania U17	5	(0)
2019	Lithuania U19	7	(0)
2021	Lithuania U21	4	(0)
2022–	Lithuania	6	(1)
- * Club domestic league appearances and goals as of 26 April 2026 ‡ National team caps and goals as of 14 June 2022

Augustinas Klimavicius (born 27 April 2001) is a Lithuanian professional footballer who plays as a forward for Serie D club Sestri Levante and the Lithuania national team.

== International career ==
Klimavičius was called up to the senior national team for the first time for a pair of friendlies in March 2022. He went on to make his senior international debut on 25 March 2022 in the first match against San Marino. He scored his first goal for the team in the thirteenth minute, the opening goal of an eventual 2–1 victory.

== Career statistics ==
=== International goals ===
Scores and results list Lithuania's goal tally first.

No.	Date	Venue	Opponent	Score	Result	Competition
1.	25 March 2022	San Marino Stadium, Serravalle, San Marino	San Marino	1–0	2–1	Friendly
Last updated 29 March 2022

=== International statistics ===
As of match played 25 March 2022

Lithuania
Year	Apps	Goals
2022	2	1
Total	2	1
