= Alessandro Bianchi (footballer, born 1989) =

Sammarinese footballer

Personal information
- Date of birth: 19 July 1989 (age 37)
- Place of birth: San Marino
- Position: Right winger

Senior career*
Years	Team	Apps	(Gls)
2010–2011	Folgore	8	(1)
2011–2012	Olympia Nova Secchiano		
2012–2013	Folgore	3	(0)
2013–2016	U.S. Pietracuta	0	(0)
2016–2017	S.P. Domagnano	20	(6)
2017–2020	Folgore	14	(3)
2018–2019	→ S.S. Cosmos (loan)	17	(3)
2018–2019	A.S.D. Arenzano F.C.		

International career^{‡}
2012–2015	San Marino	5	(0)
- * Club domestic league appearances and goals as of 25 June 2022 ‡ National team caps and goals as of 14 June 2015

Alessandro Bianchi (born 19 July 1989) is a former San Marino international footballer who played mainly as a right winger, but also as a forward and midfielder.

== International career ==
He made his senior debut on 14 August 2012, in a 3–2 defeat to Malta.
