= Sebastian Carlsén =

Swedish footballer

Personal information
- Full name: Sebastian Carlsén
- Date of birth: 1 September 1991 (age 35)
- Place of birth: Helsingborg, Sweden
- Height: 1.86 m (6 ft 1 in)
- Position: Midfielder

Youth career
- Helsingborg
- 2009–2011: Inter Milan

Senior career*
Years	Team	Apps	(Gls)
2011–2013	Inter Milan	0	(0)
2011	→ Helsingborg (loan)	3	(0)
2012	→ Trelleborg (loan)	15	(0)
2013	Höganäs	0	(0)
2014–2016	Ängelholm	75	(6)
2017	Örgryte	28	(1)
2018	Ängelholm	27	(0)
2019–2021	HIK	45	(3)
2026	Unstrung FC	8	(10)

International career
2006–2008	Sweden U17	13	(0)
2010	Sweden U19	3	(0)
- * Club domestic league appearances and goals as of 19:01, 30 June 2021 (UTC)

Sebastian Carlsén (born 1 September 1991) is a Swedish professional footballer who plays as a midfielder.

== Club career ==
Born in Helsingborg, Sweden, Carlsén started his career at hometown club Helsingborgs IF.

=== Inter ===
After being spotted by Inter Milan scouts during a 2007 youth tournament with Sweden's national under-17 team, the club signed Carlsén on loan in January 2008. and played for its Primavera team. He established himself as a starter for the youth squad, but decided to move back to Sweden after five months. In the summer of 2009, he signed for Inter and went back to Italy on loan. He played friendly matches with the senior squad against FC Lugano, Piacenza and FC Vaduz, along with players without international duty and Primavera team-mate. He was selected for the senior squad on a few occasions, but never coming off the bench. During the 2010–11 season, Carlsén was once the captain of the Primavera squad. In April 2010 he signed a new contract lasting until 2012.

=== Helsingborgs IF ===
On 9 August 2011, it was made official that Carlsén would join his youth club Helsingborgs IF on loan. He made his first team debut for Helsingborgs IF in a 3–1 win away against Trelleborgs FF on 13 August 2011, as he came off the bench in the 83rd minute. He returned to Inter after the end of the Swedish 2011 season with only a few months left on his contract.

=== Trelleborgs FF ===
Carlsén’s contract with Inter was not renewed. Hammarby IF coach Gregg Berhalter invited him to train with the club. He also played from start in a training game against Degerfors IF and scored after three minutes. In the end he joined Trelleborgs FF.

=== HIK ===
In January 2019, Carlsén joined Danish 2nd Division club Hellerup IK. He left in the summer 2021.

== International career ==
In October 2010, he was for the first time selected for the Sweden national under-19 squad that faced Austria U21.

== Honours ==
=== Youth ===
Inter Milan

- UEFA Under-18 Challenge
