= Joseph Lopy =

Senegalese footballer (born 1992)

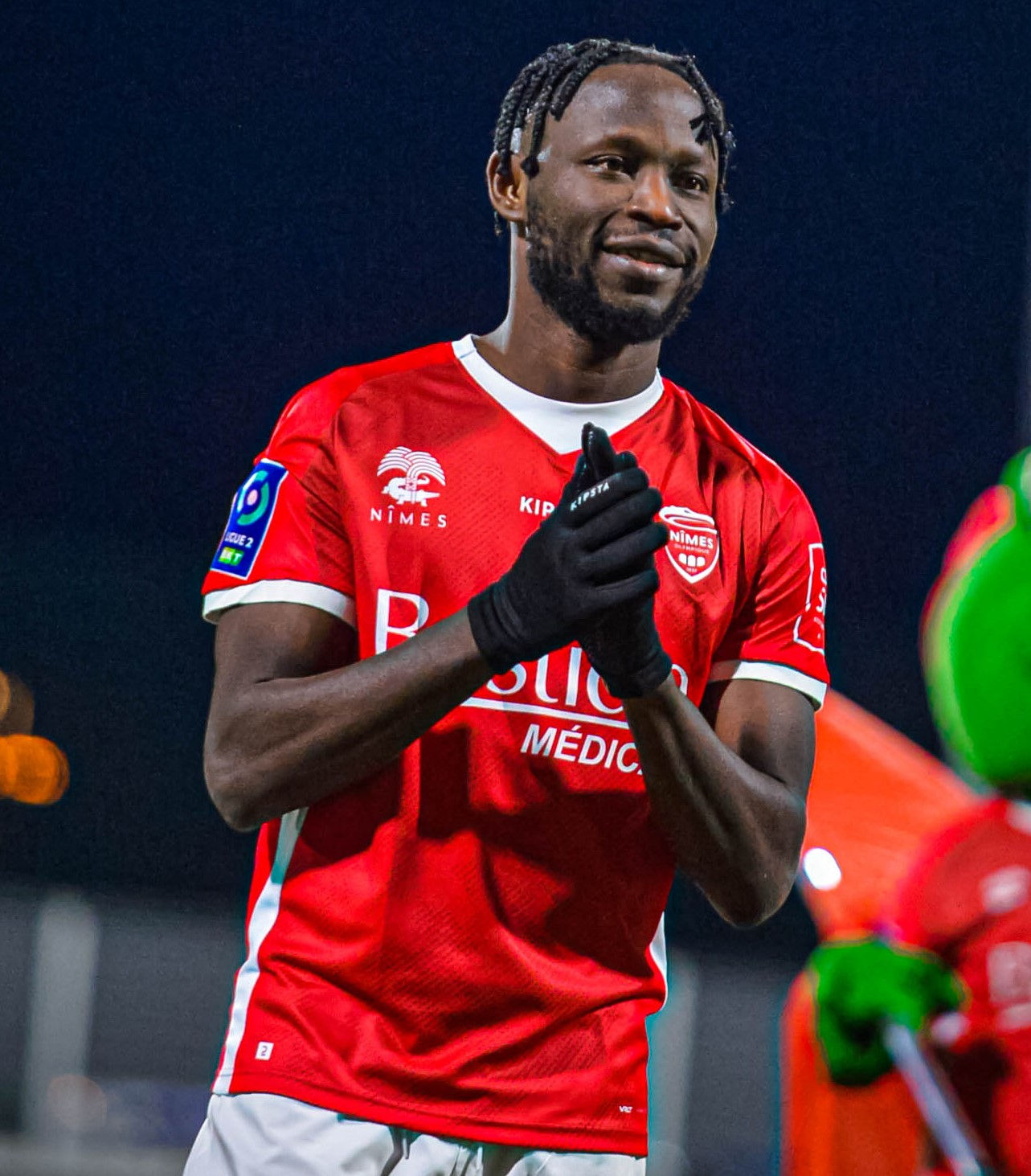
- Lopy in 2023

Personal information
- Full name: Joseph Romeric Lopy
- Date of birth: 15 March 1992 (age 34)
- Place of birth: Ziguinchor, Senegal
- Height: 1.81 m (5 ft 11 in)
- Position: Defensive midfielder

Team information
- Current team: Imperia
- Number: 8

Youth career
- 2008–2011: Diambars

Senior career*
Years	Team	Apps	(Gls)
2011–2015	Sochaux II	24	(1)
2011–2015	Sochaux	56	(1)
2015–2016	Boulogne	21	(4)
2016–2018	Clermont	52	(5)
2018–2020	Orléans	74	(11)
2020–2023	Sochaux	51	(2)
2022–2023	Sochaux II	2	(0)
2023	Nîmes	16	(0)
2023–2025	Angers	24	(3)
2024–2025	Angers II	3	(0)
2025	Pau	7	(0)
2026–	Imperia	0	(0)

International career
2011	Senegal U-23	3	(0)
2020–2022	Senegal	7	(0)
Medal record
Representing Senegal
Africa Cup of Nations
Winner	2021 Cameroon
- * Club domestic league appearances and goals as of 10 November 2026

Joseph Romeric Lopy (born 15 March 1992) is a Senegalese professional footballer who plays as a midfielder for Italian Serie D club Imperia.

== Club career ==
Born in Boutoupa, Lopy is a product of Diambars. He signed a trainee contract with Sochaux, and signed a professional contract with the Ligue 1 club in 2012. After five years with the Montbéliard side, his contract was not extended, and he signed with Boulogne of the Championnat National.

On 25 January 2023, Lopy joined Nîmes in Ligue 2 for a season. At the end of the season with Nîmes, Joseph Lopy remains in Ligue 2. He joined Angers SCO in July 2023 by signing a contract which covers two seasons.

== International career ==
Lopy made his Senegal national team debut on 9 October 2020 in a friendly against Morocco.

He was part of Senegal's squad for the 2021 Africa Cup of Nations; the Lions of Teranga went on to win the tournament for the first time in their history.

Lopy was appointed a Grand Officer of the National Order of the Lion by President of Senegal Macky Sall following the nation's victory at the tournament.

== Honours ==
Senegal

- Africa Cup of Nations: 2021

Individual

- Grand Officer of the National Order of the Lion: 2022
