= Juri Toppan =

Italian footballer

Personal information
- Date of birth: 20 January 1990 (age 36)
- Place of birth: Treviso, Italy
- Height: 1.90 m (6 ft 3 in)
- Position: Centre-back

Team information
- Current team: ASD Lovispresiano

Youth career
- Sandonà
- 2004–2008: Udinese
- 2008–2009: La Chaux-de-Fonds
- 2009: Internazionale

Senior career*
Years	Team	Apps	(Gls)
2009–2010	Internazionale	0	(0)
2009–2010	→ Villacidrese (loan)	12	(0)
2010	→ Catania (loan)	0	(0)
2010–2011	Spezia	0	(0)
2011–2012	Foggia	6	(0)
2012–2013	Treviso	1	(0)
2013–2014	Paganese	13	(0)
2015	Celaya	5	(0)
2015–2016	FC Nervesa		
2016–2022	USD Fontanelle		
2022–	ASD Lovispresiano		

International career
2008	Italy U18	1	(0)
- * Club domestic league appearances and goals as of 14 February 2026

Juri Toppan (born 20 January 1990) is an Italian footballer who plays as a centre back for ASD Lovispresiano.

== Career ==
=== Club career ===
==== Youth career ====
Born in Treviso, Veneto, Toppan started his career at Friuli side Udinese, he was a member of Udinese Giovanissimi Nazionali team in 2004–05 season. At the start of 2005–06 season he once returned to Sandonà after the loan expired but signed outright by Udinese on 31 August 2005. He was in the Udinese's Primavera under-20 squad that lost to Inter Primavera in the League playoffs round semi–final in 2007–08 season. He then left for Swiss Challenge League side La Chaux-de-Fonds and on 30 January 2009 signed by Internazionale. He made his debut for Primavera team on the next day. That half season he made 7 appearances.

==== Lega Pro clubs ====
In August 2009, he was loaned to Villacidrese of Lega Pro Seconda Divisione along with Inter teammate Matteo Lombardo. Toppan made his professional debut with Villacidrese, but on 1 February 2010 loaned to Serie A side Catania for their Primavera team, with a handful appearances.

On 29 June 2010, he was sold to newly promoted Prima Divisione side Spezia in co-ownership deal, for a peppercorn fee of €500. He was the understudy of Daniele Pedrelli, also an Inter youth product. He failed to play any league matches due to injury.

In June 2011 Inter gave up the remain 50% registration rights to Spezia. On 4 August he terminated his contract in order to join fellow third division club U.S. Foggia on free transfer.

After Foggia's bankruptcy, Toppan was signed by his hometown club Treviso, rejoining Inter teammate Jacopo Fortunato and Antonio Esposito. Toppan made his debut in a friendly match.

=== International career ===
Toppan received a call-up from Italy U17 team for 2007 UEFA European Under-17 Football Championship qualification in November 2006, but not selected to any match, even as unused substitute. He also received a call-up on 2 January (for training camp and against local teams) and against Republic of Ireland U17 on 23 and 25 January to prepare for the elite round.

On 6 September 2007, he received a call-up from Italy U18 (for training camp) and again on 27 September. On 24 April 2008, he received his last call-up, against Serbia U18 (Serbian: Млађе омладинске селекције Србије), where he made his debut in the second half, substituted Daniele Mori.
