= ASD Imperia =

Italian association football club

Imperia
- Full name: Associazione Sportiva Dilettantistica Imperia
- Founded: 2006 (RivieraPontedassio2006); 2008 (P.R.O. Imperia)
- Ground: Stadio Nino Ciccione, Imperia, Italy
- Capacity: 3,300
- Chairman: Giuseppe D'Onofrio
- Manager: Amedeo Di Latte
- League: Serie D
- 2025–26: Serie D/A, 11th
Home colours	Away colours

Associazione Sportiva Dilettantistica Imperia commonly referred to as simply Imperia (formerly A.S.D. Pro Imperia), is an Italian association football club located in Imperia, Liguria and since 13 July 2012, after the disappearance from football of the former Imperia Calcio, the club is the main team of the city. The club plays in Serie D.

== Predecessors ==
=== From U.S. Imperia to A.S.D. Imperia Calcio ===
The origins of football in Imperia go back to 1923 when was founded Unione Sportiva Imperia and refounded in 1987 as A.S. Imperia '87.

In 2008 by the last President Antonio Gagliano with A.S.D. Imperia Calcio, changing the name of the club Progetto Olimpia Imperia created in 2007. Since 2012 the club is disbanded.

== History ==
=== From A.S.D. RivieraPontedassio 2006 to A.S.D. Imperia ===
==== A.S.D. RivieraPontedassio 2006 ====
The club was founded in 2006 as A.S.D. RivieraPontedassio 2006 after the merger with Riviera Calcio Imperia (founded in 1970) and Valle Impero Pontedassio, a club born in 1983.

==== From P.R.O. Imperia to Pro Imperia ====
===== From Prima Categoria to Serie D =====
In 2008 the club merged with Onegliese and SanBart 80 and changed its name in A.S.D. P.R.O. Imperia. P.R.O stands for Pontedassio, Riviera and Onegliese. In 2010 the club changed its name to A.S.D. Pro Imperia and was promoted to Serie D in the 2010–11 season, obtained by winning the promotion play-off of Eccellenza Liguria, after an ascent started in Prima Categoria in the 2008–09 season.

==== A.S.D. Imperia ====
On 13 July 2012 the club was renamed A.S.D. Imperia following the disappearance from football of the former Imperia.

== Players ==
As of 10 November 2026

Note: Flags indicate national team as defined under FIFA eligibility rules; some limited exceptions apply. Players may hold more than one non-FIFA nationality.

No.	Pos.	Nation	Player
1	GK	FRA	Martin Sourzac
2	DF	ITA	Andrea Rizzotti
3	DF	ITA	Lorenzo Del Pino
5	DF	ITA	Simone Guida
6	MF	GHA	Nana Welbeck
7	MF	BRA	Gabriel Nunes
8	MF	SEN	Joseph Lopy
9	FW	ITA	Luca Di Renzo
10	MF	ITA	Nicholas Costantini
11	FW	ITA	Francesco Carella
12	GK	ITA	Edoardo Ascioti
14	DF	COL	Camilo Puentes
15	DF	FIN	Iiro Äijö
16	MF	ITA	Antonino Infante
17	MF	BEL	Mohamed Waki

No.	Pos.	Nation	Player
18	FW	ITA	Manuel Pisano
20	DF	ALB	Lucas Çekrezi
21	FW	ITA	Francesco Margiotta
22	GK	ITA	Stefano Colella
23	FW	ITA	Fabrizio Iavarone
26	MF	NED	Richie Musaba
27	DF	ITA	Nicola Bresciani
28	DF	ITA	Joshua Vuillermoz
31	FW	FRA	Daouda Fofana
39	DF	ITA	Laurens Serpe
72	DF	ITA	Denis Mastrazzo
77	FW	SEN	Falou Samb
78	DF	ROU	Andrei Anton
80	FW	ITA	Yago Goulart
90	MF	ITA	Simone Cecere

== Colors and badge ==
Since 13 July 2012 the team has changed its colors from white (the historic color of Riviera Calcio), black and blue to black and blue (the traditional colors of former Imperia).

== Honours ==
- Serie D
  - Winners: 1969–70 (group A), 1977–78 (group A), 1980–81 (group A)
- Campionato Nazionale Dilettanti
  - Winners: 1998–99 (group A)
- Eccellenza Liguria
  - Winners: 2005–06, 2019–20
- Prima Categoria
  - Winners: 2009–10 (group A)
- Seconda Categoria
  - Winners: 2008–09 (group A)
