= ASD Arenzano FC =

Italian football club

Arenzano
- Full name: Associazione Sportiva Dilettantistica Arenzano Football Club
- Founded: 1962; 64 years ago as, Unione Sportiva Arenzano; 2008; 18 years ago as, Borgorosso Arenzano Polisportiva Dilettantistica; 2011; 15 years ago as, Associazione Sportiva Dilettantistica Arenzano Football Club
- Ground: Stadio Nazario Gambino, Arenzano, Italy
- Capacity: 1,000
- Chairman: Alberto Garetto
- Manager: Rodrigue Boisfer
- League: Eccellenza Liguria
- 2010–11: Serie D/A, 19th (relegated)
- Website: www.arenzanofc.it
Home colours	Away colours

Associazione Sportiva Dilettantistica Arenzano Football Club is an Italian association football club, based in Arenzano, Liguria. It currently plays in Eccellenza Liguria.

== History ==
Former Borgorosso Arenzano logo until 2011

=== From Borgorosso Arenzano P.D. to A.S.D. Arenzano F.C. ===
In the 2010–11 season, Borgorosso Arenzano P.D. was relegated to Eccellenza from Serie D group A.

In the summer 2011, the club changed its name to the current one before playing in 2011–12 Eccellenza Liguria.

In the 2011–12 season, Arenzano was relegated to Promozione Liguria from Eccellenza Liguria.

== Color and badge ==
The team's colors are white, red and black.

== Honours ==
- Eccellenza Liguria: 2008–09
