= Silvano Raggio Garibaldi =

Italian footballer (born 1989)

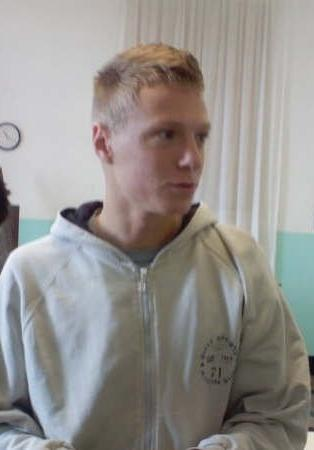

Personal information
- Full name: Silvano Raggio Garibaldi
- Date of birth: 27 March 1989 (age 37)
- Place of birth: Chiavari, Italy
- Height: 1.78 m (5 ft 10 in)
- Position: Midfielder

Team information
- Current team: Sestri Levante
- Number: 17

Youth career
- Virtus Entella
- Genoa

Senior career*
Years	Team	Apps	(Gls)
2007–2012	Genoa	2	(0)
2008–2009	→ Pisa (loan)	6	(0)
2010	→ Sorrento (loan)	7	(0)
2010–2012	→ Gubbio (loan)	63	(1)
2012–2015	Virtus Entella	19	(0)
2014–2015	→ Mantova (loan)	25	(3)
2015–2017	Mantova	68	(0)
2017	Lavagnese	13	(0)
2017–2018	Mantova	19	(0)
2018–2020	Como	43	(2)
2020–2021	Foggia	11	(0)
2021–2022	Seregno	18	(0)
2023–	Sestri Levante	86	(2)

International career
2007	Italy U-18	1	(0)
2007–2008	Italy U-19	7	(0)
2008–2010	Italy U-20	14	(2)
- * Club domestic league appearances and goals as of 25 June 2026

Silvano Raggio Garibaldi (born 27 March 1989) is an Italian professional footballer who plays as a midfielder for Serie D club Sestri Levante. Born in Chiavari, he has represented Italy at Under-18, Under-19 and Under-20 levels.

== Club career ==
Raggio Garibaldi made his Serie A debut on 14 April 2008 in a 3–0 home win for his side against Torino.

He spent the 2008–09 season on loan to Serie B side Pisa. He then spent three consecutive seasons on loan, first to Sorrento of the Lega Pro Prima Divisione and then for two consecutive seasons to Gubbio (the first in Lega Pro Prima Divisione, the second in Serie B). In July 2012 he was reacquired by his hometown club Virtus Entella, where he had already been a youth player. His stint with the Chiavari-based club was already marred by injuries, as he struggled to gain a regular first-team place.

On 3 November 2018, he signed with Serie D club Como. On 20 June 2019, following Como's promotion to Serie C, he signed a new 2-year contract with the club.

On 9 October 2020 he joined Foggia.

On 5 August 2021 he signed with Seregno.
