= ASD Lerici Castle =

Italian football club

Lerici Castle
- Full name: Associazione Sportiva Dilettantistica Lerici Castle
- Founded: 1998; 28 years ago as, Fo.Ce. Vara 1998 (merged); 2007; 19 years ago as, Fo.Ce. Lunezia (merged); 2008; 18 years ago as, Fo.Ce. Vara; 2013; 13 years ago as, Associazione Sportiva Dilettantistica Lerici Castle (relocated)
- Ground: Campo Sportivo Franco Cimma, La Spezia Pagliari, Italy
- Capacity: 350
- Chairman: Manlio Giaquinto
- League: Promozione Liguria
- 2007–08: Serie D/E, 18th (relegated)
Home colours	Away colours

Associazione Sportiva Dilettantistica Lerici Castle is an Italian association football club located in Lerici, Liguria. It currently plays in Promozione Liguria.

== History ==
=== Fo.Ce. Vara 1998 ===

The club was founded in August 1998 as Associazione Sportiva Dilettantistica Fo.Ce. Vara 1998 (Fo.Ce. stands for Follo and Ceparana) after the merger of U.S. Folbas, U.S. Ceparana 1933 and F.B.C. Vara, a club located in Ceparana, a frazione of Bolano, Liguria.

==== Serie D ====
The team has played also in serie D for 5 years from the season 2003–04 to that 2007–08.

In 2007 the club was merged with Lunezia to form Fo.Ce. Lunezia but was immediately relegated at the end of the season and in 2008 it was renamed with the original name in Eccellenza Liguria.

==== From Eccellenza to Prima Categoria ====
In the season 2009–10 it was relegated to Promozione Liguria and in the following in Prima Categoria Liguria.

==== Promozione ====
In the season 2012–13 it was promoted to Promozione Liguria.

=== Lerici Castle ===
On 24 October 2013 the club moved to Lerici and was renamed with the current name.

== Colors and badge ==
Its colors are white, blue and black.
