= Gianluca Litteri =

Italian footballer

Personal information
- Date of birth: 6 June 1988 (age 38)
- Place of birth: Catania, Italy
- Height: 1.86 m (6 ft 1 in)
- Position: Forward

Youth career
- 2005–2006: Giarre
- 2006–2008: Internazionale

Senior career*
Years	Team	Apps	(Gls)
2008–2011	Internazionale	0	(0)
2008–2009	→ Slavia Prague (loan)	2	(1)
2009–2010	→ Vicenza (loan)	11	(1)
2010–2011	→ Salernitana (loan)	17	(2)
2011–2014	Ternana	93	(17)
2014–2015	Virtus Entella	16	(1)
2015	Latina	14	(0)
2015–2018	Cittadella	86	(33)
2018–2019	Venezia	34	(8)
2019–2020	Cosenza	17	(0)
2020	→ Padova (loan)	6	(0)
2020–2022	Triestina	48	(12)
2022–2023	Catania	4	(0)
2023–2024	Akragas	20	(6)
2024–2025	Avezzano	7	(0)
- * Club domestic league appearances and goals as of 13 November 2024

Gianluca Litteri (born 6 June 1988) is an Italian footballer who plays as a striker.

== Career ==
Litteri was signed by Inter in 2006 from Serie D club Giarre, being then loaned out to Slavia Prague during the summer 2008 transfer window. From July 2008 until January 2009 Treviso holds half of player's registration rights before bought back by Inter.

In August 2009, he was loaned to Vicenza. In August 2010 he was loaned out to Salernitana, with an option for his new club to acquire half of the player's rights from Inter.

On 31 January 2019, he signed a 2.5-year contract with Cosenza.

On 7 January 2020, he joined Padova in Serie C on loan with an option to buy.

On 5 October 2020, he moved to Triestina on a two-year contract.

After two seasons with Triestina, on 20 August 2022, he was unveiled as a new signing of newly-refounded Catania for their Serie D campaign.
