= Samuel Day (sportsman) =

English sportsperson (1878–1950)

Sammy Day
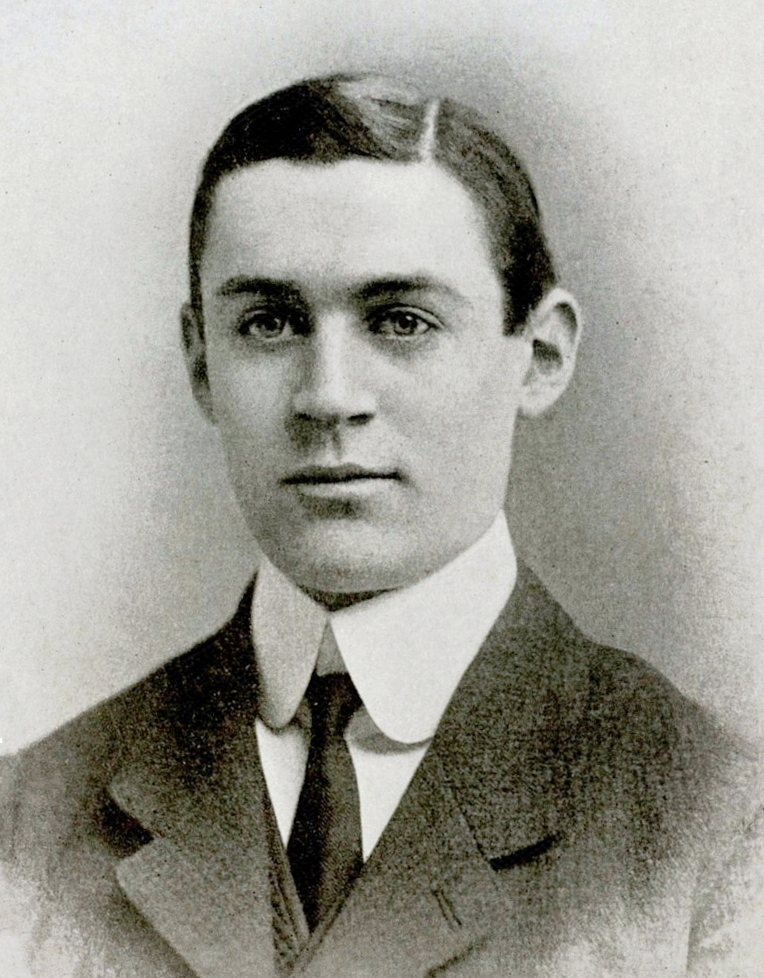
- Day in around 1903

Personal information
- Full name: Samuel Hulme Day
- Born: 29 December 1878; Peckham Rye, London
- Died: 21 February 1950 (aged 71); Chobham, Surrey
- Batting: Right-handed
- Bowling: Right arm fast
- Relatives: Sydney Day (brother); Arthur Day (brother); Anthony Day (son); David Day (nephew)

Domestic team information
- Years: Team
- 1897–1919: Kent
- 1899–1902: Cambridge University

Career statistics
Competition	First-class
Matches	171
Runs scored	7,722
Batting average	29.70
100s/50s	7/48
Top score	152*
Balls bowled	397
Wickets	8
Bowling average	39.62
5 wickets in innings	0
10 wickets in match	0
Best bowling	4/46
Catches/stumpings	58/–
- Source: CricInfo, 7 April 2016

Samuel Day
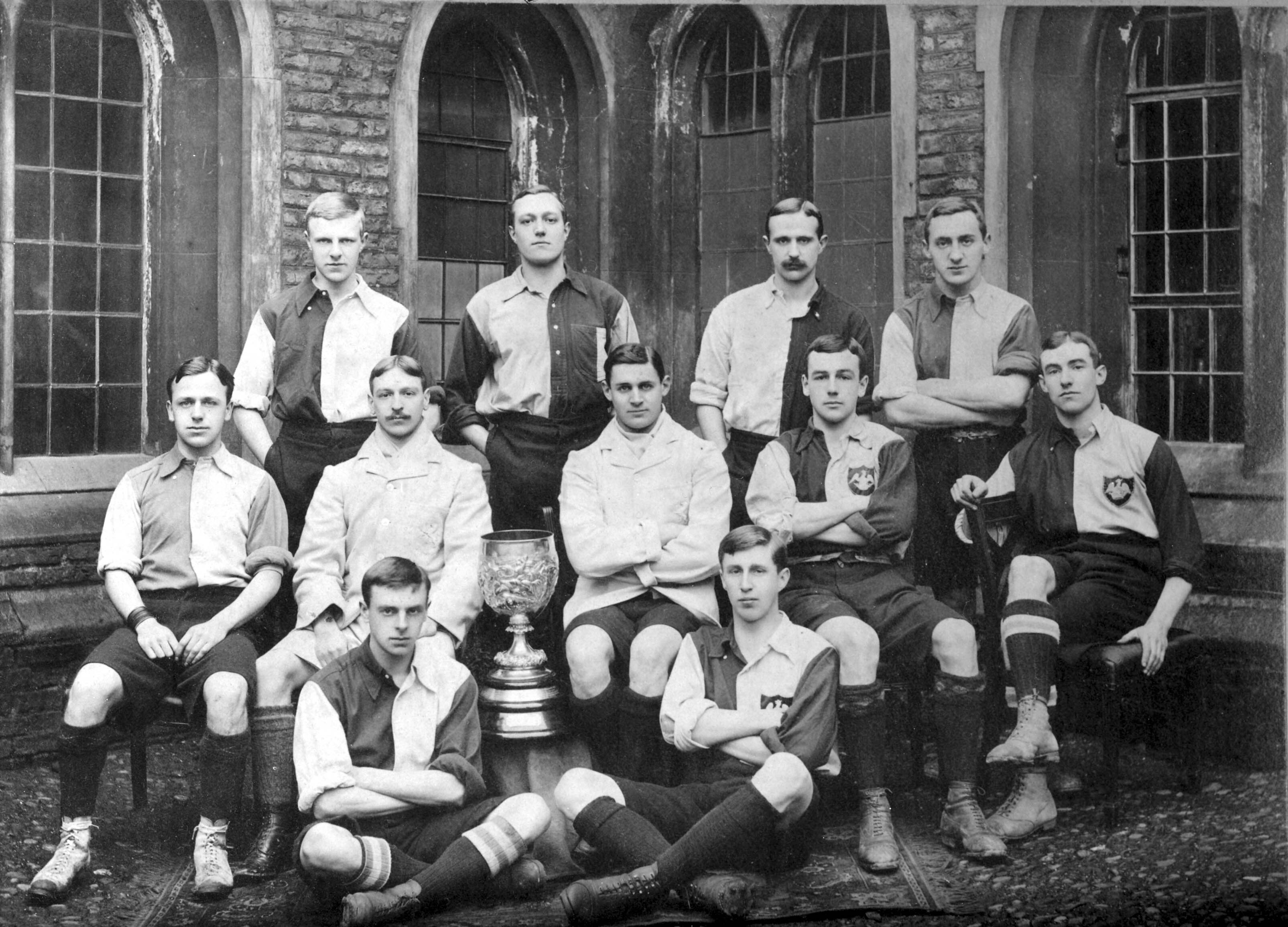
- Day (centre) captained the Queens' College football team 1901–1902 whilst at Cambridge

Personal information
- Position: Inside forward

Senior career*
Years	Team	Apps	(Gls)
- Old Malvernians
1898–1914	Corinthians	108	(117)

International career
1906	England	3	(2)
- * Club domestic league appearances and goals

Samuel Hulme Day (29 December 1878 – 21 February 1950) was an amateur sportsman who played first-class cricket for Kent County Cricket Club and association football for Corinthian F.C. He made three international appearances for the England football team as an inside forward.

== Early life ==
Day was born in Peckham Rye in Southwark, the son of Sydney and Evelyn Day. His father was a wine merchant. Day attended Shirley House School in Blackheath and Malvern College before going up to Queens' College, Cambridge. He was the older brother of Sydney and Arthur Day, both of whom also played first-class cricket for Kent.

== Cricket career ==
Day was captain of the Malvern College cricket team in 1897 and 1898. He made his first-class cricket debut for Kent County Cricket Club whilst still at school, scoring a century in his first match against Gloucestershire at Cheltenham, an achievement his Wisden obituary describes as "a unique feat". He continued playing for Kent whilst at Cambridge University where he attended Queens' College, graduating in 1902.

Day played 32 times for Cambridge University, captaining the team in 1901. He played in four Varsity matches, scoring 117 not out in 1902, and was awarded his cricket Blue in his first year. He scored a total of 1,631 runs for the university, hitting two centuries.

Described as a "stylish batsman", especially on the off-side, Day played 128 times for Kent between 1897 and 1919, scoring 5,893 runs. He played regularly for the team in most seasons until the start of the First World War, although he made just one appearance for the county in Kent's first County Championship winning season of 1906 and again in 1910 and not at all in the 1913 Championship winning season. He scored more than 1,000 runs in 1899 and 1901 and averaged 31.34 runs per innings for the county. He played one first-class match in 1919, appearing in the 1919 County Championship against Hampshire County Cricket Club at Dean Park.

== Football career ==
Day was an inside forward and played once for Cambridge University in 1901, although he also captained the Queens' College team. He went on to play amateur football for Old Malvernians and made 108 appearances for Corinthians between 1898 and 1914, scoring 117 goals for the team. Day scored 68 of his goals on tour for Corinthians, including nine goals against All New York and seven against Cincinnati on the Corinthian 1906 tour of Canada and the United States.

He was described as an "excellent inside-forward" and was selected to play for England in the 1905–06 British Home Championship. He made three appearances for England, all in 1906, scoring two goals. He also made six appearances for the England amateur team which was established in 1906. Day played in the team's first match against France at Parc des Princes in Paris in November 1906, scoring twice.

== Later life ==
Day became a school teacher after leaving university. He was an assistant master at Westminster School between 1903 and 1913 before moving to be the headmaster of Heatherdown preparatory school in Berkshire. His son, Anthony, was a teacher at Charterhouse School, coaching the school cricket team. He played once for Cambridge University in 1953.

Day died at Chobham in Surrey in 1950 aged 71.
