= Charles Toppin (Cambridge University cricketer) =

English cricketer

Personal information
- Born: 9 August 1864; Skelton, Cumberland, England
- Died: 8 June 1928 (aged 63); Great Malvern, Worcestershire, England
- Batting: Right-handed
- Bowling: Right-arm fast

Domestic team information
- Years: Team
- 1885 to 1887: Cambridge University

Career statistics
| Competition | First-class |
|---|---|
| Matches | 25 |
| Runs scored | 319 |
| Batting average | 8.86 |
| 100s/50s | 0/0 |
| Top score | 39 |
| Balls bowled | 4,956 |
| Wickets | 81 |
| Bowling average | 25.41 |
| 5 wickets in innings | 2 |
| 10 wickets in match | 0 |
| Best bowling | 7/51 |
| Catches/stumpings | 14/– |
- Source: Cricinfo, 6 August 2015

Charles Toppin (9 August 1864 – 8 June 1928) was an English cricketer who played 25 first-class matches in the late 19th century. The bulk of these (20) were for Cambridge University, but he also appeared twice each for the Gentlemen and Gentlemen of England, and once for Marylebone Cricket Club (MCC).

Charles Toppin was educated at Sedbergh School and St John's College, Cambridge. He made his first-class debut for Cambridge against C. I. Thornton's England XI in May 1885, claiming Thornton's wicket as his first at this level. His best bowling figures came in the Varsity Match against Oxford University at Lord's later that same season, when his first-innings return of 7-51 set up a seven-wicket victory.

Toppin appeared for the Gentlemen against the Players at Lord's in 1885 and 1886, while he continued to play for Cambridge until 1887, being selected for both Varsity matches. After a gap of several years, he made one final first-class appearance in 1891 when he played for MCC against Somerset at Taunton. He also played several times for Cumberland and for Worcestershire in its pre-first-class days.

He was a master for 42 years at Malvern College, Worcestershire, where he also coached the cricket team. He encouraged batsmen to attack, with an emphasis on front-foot drives. Several of his pupils became Test players, including R. E. Foster, Frank Mann, Donald Knight and Errol Holmes.

Two of Toppin's sons, another Charles and John, each played briefly for Worcestershire.
