= Sydney Day =

English sportsman

Personal information
- Full name: Sydney Ernest Day
- Born: 9 February 1884; Blackheath, Kent
- Died: 20 July 1970 (aged 86); West Malling, Kent
- Batting: Right-handed
- Relatives: Samuel Day (brother); Arthur Day (brother); David Day (nephew)

Domestic team information
- Years: Team
- 1922–1925: Kent
- FC debut: 5 July 1922 Kent v Notts
- Last FC: 15 July 1925 Kent v Gloucestershire

Career statistics
Competition	First-class
Matches	11
Runs scored	245
Batting average	18.84
100s/50s	0/0
Top score	45*
Catches/stumpings	4/–
- Source: ESPNcricinfo, 7 July 2016

Sydney Ernest Day (9 February 1884 – 7 July 1970) was an English amateur sportsman who played cricket for Kent County Cricket Club between 1922 and 1925 and football for Old Malvernians and Corinthian. He served in the First World War in the Royal Fusiliers and the Royal Engineers and was wounded during the Battle of the Somme.

== Early life ==
Day was the third son of a wine merchant and was named after his father. He was educated at Shirley House School in Blackheath and Malvern College. Day played football for Malvern and appeared in the Second XI cricket team. On leaving school he joined the Royal Insurance Company, working in London.

Day played at outside-right for Old Malvernians F.C. and was Secretary of the club between 1908 and 1910. He also played amateur football for Kent.

== Military service ==
Day enlisted at the start of World War I joining the Royal Fusiliers in September 1914, initially as a private in the 18th (Public Schools) Battalion. He was commissioned as Second Lieutenant in July 1915 and served on the Western Front in France with 17th Battalion, Royal Fusiliers from April 1916. Day fought in the Battle of the Somme in a Trench Mortar Battery and was wounded in November 1916 at Beaumont-Hamel during the Battle of the Ancre, the last phase of the Somme offensive. He was invalided to the UK to recuperate and in January 1917 was attached to the Inland Waterways Division of the Royal Engineers. Day served the rest of the war in the UK, reaching the rank of captain when he relinquished his commission in February 1919, by which time the war was over.

== First-class cricket career ==
Day played in 11 first-class cricket matches for Kent, making his debut in 1922 in a County Championship match against Nottinghamshire. Eight of his appearances were made during the 1923 season and he played his final two first-class matches the following season. He made his highest score of 45 not out against Worcestershire in 1923, an innings which secured the match for Kent. He played club cricket for The Mote in Maidstone.

== Later life and family ==
Day was on the Kent County Cricket Club Committee from 1946 to 1958 and was President of the club in 1954. He served as a Justice of the Peace and was an active Freemason in later life. His brothers, Arthur and Sammy both also played for Kent, with Sammy also playing over 100 games for Corinthian and making three appearances for the England football team and six for the England amateur team.

Day married Faith Winch in 1915. He died in 1970 at home in West Malling at the age of 86.
