= US Sestri Levante 1919 =

Italian association football club

Sestri Levante
- Full name: Unione Sportiva Sestri Levante 1919
- Nickname: Corsari (the pirates)
- Founded: 27 September 1919; 107 years ago
- Ground: Stadio Giuseppe Sivori, Sestri Levante, Italy
- Capacity: 1,500
- Chairman: Stefano Risaliti
- Manager: Alberto Ruvo
- League: Serie D
- 2024–25: Serie C Group B, 19th of 20 (relegated)
Home colours	Away colours

Unione Sportiva Sestri Levante 1919 is an Italian association football club located in Sestri Levante, Liguria. Currently, it plays in Serie D.

== History ==
The club was founded in 1919.

=== 1940s in Serie C ===
Sestri Levante participated in Serie C for three seasons between 1946 and 1949. After that, Sestri Levante played mostly in minor categories such as Promozione, Eccellenza, and Serie D.

=== 2010s to current: Serie D and promotion to Serie C ===
In the season 2011–12, the team was promoted from Eccellenza Liguria to Serie D.

On 6 April 2023, Sestri Levante were promoted back to Serie C after mathematically winning the Group A title of the 2022–23 Serie D with four games to go.

== Players ==
=== Current squad ===
As of 5 February 2026

Note: Flags indicate national team as defined under FIFA eligibility rules; some limited exceptions apply. Players may hold more than one non-FIFA nationality.

No.	Pos.	Nation	Player
1	GK	ALB	Vullnet Tozaj
2	MF	ITA	Nicolò Dall'Asta
3	DF	ITA	Lorenzo Tarantola (on loan from Pro Vercelli)
4	DF	ITA	Massimiliano Pane
5	DF	ITA	Mattia Giammaressi
6	DF	ITA	Kevin Piazza
8	MF	ITA	Federico Masini
9	FW	ALB	Enis Tozaj
10	MF	ITA	Valentino Salducco
11	MF	ITA	Andrea Ferretti
15	MF	ITA	Matteo Garzia

No.	Pos.	Nation	Player
16	DF	ITA	Alexander Attuoni
17	MF	ITA	Silvano Raggio Garibaldi
18	MF	ITA	Emanuele Annaloro
19	FW	LTU	Augustinas Klimavičius
20	DF	ITA	Cristiano Anzalone
21	FW	ITA	Gabriele Lunghi
22	GK	ITA	Simone Mazzadi
23	MF	ITA	Andrea Pio Loco
24	DF	ITA	Matteo Cattaneo
25	FW	ITA	Matteo Maccioni
26	DF	ITA	Federico Pastore
27	LWB	BAN	Fahamedul Islam

== Colours and badge ==
Its colours are red and blue.
