= SS Villacidrese Calcio =

Defunct Italian association football club located in Villacidro, Sardinia

SS Villacidrese C.
- Full name: Società Sportiva Villacidrese Calcio S.r.l.
- Nickname(s): Biancoceleste
- Founded: 1979
- Ground: Stadio Comunale, Villacidro, Italy
- Capacity: 2,000
- League: Eccellenza Sardinia
Home colours	Away colours

Società Sportiva Villacidrese Calcio is an Italian association football club located in Villacidro, Sardinia.

Its colors are yellow and blue following the merger with SS Riunite Villacidro, placing the previous white and blue.

== History ==
The club was founded in 1979.

=== From Serie D to Lega Pro Seconda Divisione ===
Villacidrese finished first in Eccellenza Sardinia in the 1998–99 season, obtaining its first-ever promotion to Serie D. For the next 10 seasons, the team played in Serie D.

In the Serie D 2008–09 season, the team was ranked first place in Girone G, obtaining a place in Lega Pro Seconda Divisione for the first time in its history, where it has played in 2009–10 in group A.

=== From Lega Pro Seconda Divisione to exclusion from football ===
The club played its second season of professional football in the girone B of the Lega Pro Seconda Divisione. At the end of the season, the club was relegated to Serie D, also suffering a 13-point deduction.

In summer 2011 it did not appeal against the exclusion of Covisod from this league and it was excluded from all football.
