= 2006–07 Inter Milan season =

Internazionale
2006–07 season
- Owner: Massimo Moratti
- President: Giacinto Facchetti (until 4 September 2006); Massimo Moratti
- Head coach: Roberto Mancini
- Stadium: San Siro
- Serie A: 1st
- Coppa Italia: Runners-up
- Supercoppa Italiana: Winners
- UEFA Champions League: Round of 16
- Top goalscorer: League: Zlatan Ibrahimović (15); All: Hernán Crespo (20)
- Highest home attendance: 64,758 vs Torino (27 May 2007)
- Lowest home attendance: 35,835 vs Cagliari (18 February 2007)
- Average home league attendance: 48,284
Home colours	Away colours

The 2006–07 season was Football Club Internazionale Milano's 98th in existence and 91st consecutive season in the top flight of Italian football. The team competed in Serie A, in the Coppa Italia, in the Supercoppa Italiana and in the UEFA Champions League.

== Season overview ==
The relegation of Juventus to Serie B due to Calciopoli, and Milan and Fiorentina's penalisations, made Inter a clear favourite for the title: the side was empowered with the arrivals of Zlatan Ibrahimović, Patrick Vieira, Fabio Grosso and Maicon. In early September, the club suffered a tragedy: Inter's president Giacinto Facchetti died at the age of 64, due to a cancer.

The 2006–07 season was signed by records: Inter won 17 games in row for an achievement still unbeaten. Inter also got 11 wins in away matches and obtained the title with 5 games left to play. The side ended with 97 points, 22 over Roma which came second: in 38 matches Inter collected 30 wins, 7 draws and just one defeat (the first in Serie A since April 2006) against Roma.

== Players ==
=== Squad information ===
As of 27 May 2007

Squad no.	Name	Nationality	Position	Date of birth (age)
Goalkeepers
1	Francesco Toldo	(Italy)	GK	2 December 1971 (aged 34)
12	Júlio César	(Brazil)	GK	3 September 1979 (aged 26)
22	Paolo Orlandoni	(Italy)	GK	12 August 1972 (aged 33)
Defenders
2	Iván Córdoba	(Colombia)	CB	11 August 1976 (aged 29)
4	Javier Zanetti (Captain)	(Argentina)	RB / CM / RM	10 August 1973 (aged 32)
6	Maxwell	(Brazil)	LB	27 August 1981 (aged 24)
11	Fabio Grosso	(Italy)	LB	28 November 1977 (aged 28)
13	Maicon Sisenando	(Brazil)	RB	21 July 1981 (aged 24)
16	Nicolás Burdisso	(Argentina)	CB	12 April 1981 (aged 25)
23	Marco Materazzi	(Italy)	CB	19 August 1973 (aged 32)
25	Walter Samuel	(Argentina)	CB	23 March 1978 (aged 28)
Midfielders
5	Dejan Stanković	(Serbia)	CM / AM	11 September 1978 (aged 27)
7	Luís Figo	(Portugal)	RW / AM	4 November 1972 (aged 33)
14	Patrick Vieira	(France)	DM / CM	23 June 1976 (aged 30)
15	Olivier Dacourt	(France)	CM	25 September 1974 (aged 31)
19	Esteban Cambiasso	(Argentina)	DM	18 August 1980 (aged 25)
21	Santiago Solari	(Argentina)	CM	7 October 1976 (aged 29)
91	Mariano González	(Argentina)	RW / LW / AM	5 May 1981 (aged 25)
Forwards
8	Zlatan Ibrahimović	(Sweden)	CF	3 October 1981 (aged 24)
9	Julio Cruz	(Argentina)	CF	10 October 1974 (aged 31)
10	Adriano	(Brazil)	CF	17 February 1982 (aged 24)
18	Hernán Crespo	(Argentina)	CF	5 July 1975 (aged 31)
20	Álvaro Recoba	(Uruguay)	SS / LW / AM	17 March 1976 (aged 30)

==== From youth squad ====
Note: Flags indicate national team as defined under FIFA eligibility rules; some limited exceptions apply. Players may hold more than one non-FIFA nationality.

No.	Pos.	Nation	Player
36	DF	ITA	Simone Fautario
47	MF	ITA	Francesco Bolzoni
50	MF	BEL	Ibrahim Maaroufi
51	DF	ITA	Leonardo Bonucci
57	MF	HUN	Attila Filkor

No.	Pos.	Nation	Player
58	MF	FRA	Jonathan Biabiany
60	FW	URU	Sebastián Ribas
61	FW	SWE	Goran Slavkovski
77	DF	ITA	Marco Andreolli
99	FW	GRE	Lampros Choutos

=== Transfers ===
In
Pos.	Name	from	Type
FW	Zlatan Ibrahimović	Juventus	€24 million
MF	Patrick Vieira	Juventus	€9,5 million
DF	Maicon	Monaco	€6 million
DF	Fabio Grosso	Palermo	€6,5 million
FW	Hernán Crespo	Chelsea	loan
DF	Maxwell	Empoli	loan ended
MF	Olivier Dacourt	Roma	
MF	Mariano González	Palermo	loan
FW	Attila Filkor	Pietà Hotspurs	
MF	Ibrahim Maaroufi	PSV	
MF	Luca Siligardi	Dorando Pietri	
FW	Ignazio Cocchiere	Legnano	
FW	Sebastián Ribas	Juventud	
FW	Gianluca Litteri	Giarre	

Out
Pos.	Name	To	Type
DF	Giuseppe Favalli	A.C. Milan	
DF	Zé Maria	Levante	
DF	Siniša Mihajlović		retired
MF	Juan Sebastián Verón	Estudiantes	
MF	Cristiano Zanetti	Juventus	
MF	David Pizarro	Roma	co-ownership €6,5 million
FW	Obafemi Martins	Newcastle United	€15 million

==== Loan in ====
- (Italy) Mario Balotelli – (Italy) Lumezzane, season-long loan
- (Italy) Giuseppe Figliomeni – (Italy) Crotone

==== Out ====
- (Brazil) Guilherme Siqueira – (Italy) Udinese, €750,000, 11 August
- (Argentina) Kily González – released (later joined (Argentina) Rosario Central)

==== Loan out ====
- (Brazil) César – (Brazil) Corinthians
- (Italy) Francesco Coco – (Italy) Torino
- (Brazil) César – (Italy) Livorno, 25 January

== Pre-season and friendlies ==
=== Riscone di Brunico training camp ===
20 July 2006 Friendly	Internazionale	4–1	Internazionale B	Bruneck
	Slavkovski 14'; Martins 25'; Stanković 71', 75'	Report	Belaïd 51'	Stadium: Riscone di Brunico

23 July 2006 Friendly	Südtirol	1–2	Internazionale	Bruneck
	Dal Piaz 55'	Report	Slavkovski 35'; Bounucci 63'	Stadium: Riscone di Brunico

26 July 2006 Südtirol Cup	Internazionale	1–1 (4–5 p)	Monaco	Bruneck
	Pizarro 78' (pen.)	Report	Ménez 71' (pen.)	Stadium: Riscone di Brunico; Referee: Nicola Rizzoli
	Penalties
	Choutos (penalty scored); César (penalty scored); Di. Marino (penalty scored); Belaïd (penalty scored); Solari (penalty missed)		Gerard (penalty scored); Licata (penalty scored); Leko (penalty scored); Maurice-Belay (penalty scored); Sambou (penalty scored)

30 July 2006 Südtirol Cup	Tottenham Hotspur	2–1	Internazionale	London, England
	Tainio 37', 70'	Report	Martins 44'	Stadium: White Hart Lane; Referee: Mike Dean (England)

6 August 2006 Friendly	Internazionale	9–0	SSV Brunico	Bruneck
	Recoba 9', 57'; De Filippis 11'; Maaroufi 16'; Cruz 32'; Siligardi 64', 77'; Ribas 89'	Report		Stadium: Riscone di Brunico

10 August 2006 Friendly	Internazionale	6–0	Bressanone	Bruneck
	Vieira 13'; Figo 16'; Ribas 26', 36'; Recoba 43'; Litteri 72'	Report		Stadium: Riscone di Brunico

=== Amsterdam Tournament ===
4 August 2006 Friendly	Ajax	1–1	Internazionale	Amsterdam, Netherlands
	Sneijder 86'	Report	Solari 18'	Stadium: Amsterdam Arena; Attendance: 25,500; Referee: Jan Wegereef (Netherlands)

5 August 2006 Friendly	Internazionale	3–2	Porto	Amsterdam, Netherlands
	Pizarro 7'; Martins 8', 38'	Report	Adriano 80'; Čech 90'	Stadium: Amsterdam Arena; Referee: Kevin Blom (Netherlands)

=== Birra Moretti Trophy ===
11 August 2006 Friendly	Juventus	1–0	Internazionale	Naples, Italy
20:30 CEST	Zalayeta 13'	Report		Stadium: Stadio San Paolo; Referee: Domenico Messina (Italy)

11 August 2006 Friendly	Napoli	1–0	Internazionale	Naples, Italy
21:30 CEST	Calaiò 22'	Report		Stadium: Stadio San Paolo; Referee: Luca Banti (Italy)

=== Trofeo Pirelli ===
20 August 2006 Friendly	Mallorca	0–1	Internazionale	Palma de Mallorca, Spain
		Report	Maicon 66'	Stadium: Estadi de Son Moix

21 August 2006 Friendly	Sporting CP	0–0	Internazionale	Palma de Mallorca, Spain
		Report	Materazzi (red card)	Stadium: Estadi de Son Moix

=== TIM Trophy ===
31 August 2006 Friendly	Internazionale	1–2	Milan	Milan, Italy
21:00 CEST	Cruz 19'	Report	Favalli 31'; Borriello 35'	Stadium: San Siro; Attendance: 18,110; Referee: Gianluca Rocchi

31 August 2006 Friendly	Internazionale	1–1 (5–4 p)	Juventus	Milan, Italy
22:00 CEST	Figo 27'	Report	Del Piero 5'; Giannichedda (red card) 36'	Stadium: San Siro; Attendance: 18,110; Referee: Domenico Celi
	Penalties
	Cruz (penalty scored); Adriano (penalty missed); Figo (penalty scored); Maaroufi (penalty scored); Marino (penalty missed)		Nedvěd (penalty scored); Guzmán (penalty scored); Birindelli (penalty missed); Zalayeta (penalty scored); Del Piero (penalty scored)

=== Other friendlies ===
8 August 2006 Friendly	Watford	1–1	Internazionale	Watford, England
	King 60'	Report	Andreolli 75'	Stadium: Vicarage Road; Referee: Dermot Gallagher (England)

5 October 2007 Trofeo Sky	Atalanta	3–2	Internazionale	Bergamo, Italy
	Soncin 57'; Burdisso 82' (o.g.); Pinto 90'	Report	Burdisso 45'; Figo 66'	Stadium: Stadio Atleti Azzurri d'Italia

6 January 2007 Bahrain Cup	Bahrain	1–6	Internazionale	Bahrain
		Report	Adriano 28', 41'; Ibrahimović 49'; Maicon 71'; González 83', 87'	Referee: Khalil Al Ghamdi (Saudi Arabia)

8 February 2007 Friendly	Internazionale	3–0	Chiasso	Appiano Gentile, Como, Italy
	Samuel 7'; Solari 8'; González 49'	Report		Stadium: Angelo Moratti Sports Centre

== Competitions ==
=== Overview ===
Competition	First match	Last match	Starting round	Final position	Record							
Competition	First match	Last match	Starting round	Final position	Pld	W	D	L	GF	GA	GD	Win %
Serie A	9 September 2006	27 May 2007	Matchday 1	Winners	38	30	7	1	80	34	+46	78.95
Coppa Italia	9 November 2006	17 May 2007	Round of 16	Runners-up	8	6	1	1	16	7	+9	75.00
Supercoppa Italiana	26 August 2006		Final	Winners	1	1	0	0	4	3	+1	100.00
Champions League	12 September 2006	6 March 2007	Group stage	Round of 16	8	3	3	2	7	7	+0	37.50
Total					55	40	11	4	107	51	+56	72.73

Last updated: 27 May 2007
Source: Soccerway

=== Serie A ===
==== League table ====
Pos	Team	Pld	W	D	L	GF	GA	GD	Pts	Qualification or relegation
1	Internazionale (C)	38	30	7	1	80	34	+46	97	Qualification to Champions League group stage (Note: Milan qualified for 2007–08 UEFA Champions League group stage instead of third qualifying round as the title holders.)
2	Roma	38	22	9	7	74	34	+40	75	Qualification to Champions League group stage
3	Lazio (Note: Fiorentina were docked 15 points, Reggina 11 points, Milan 8 points and Lazio 3 points, all for involvement in the 2006 Italian football scandal.)	38	18	11	9	59	33	+26	62	Qualification to Champions League third qualifying round
4	Milan	38	19	12	7	57	36	+21	61	Qualification to Champions League group stage
5	Palermo	38	16	10	12	58	51	+7	58	Qualification to UEFA Cup first round

Source: "Serie A 2006/2007 - 38. Round". worldfootball.net. 21 July 2025.
Rules for classification: 1) points; 2) goal difference; 3) number of goals scored.
(C) Champions

==== Results summary ====
Overall								Home						Away					
Pld	W	D	L	GF	GA	GD	Pts	W	D	L	GF	GA	GD	W	D	L	GF	GA	GD
38	30	7	1	80	34	+46	97	15	3	1	42	19	+23	15	4	0	38	15	+23

Last updated: 27 May 2007.
Source: Competitive matches

==== Results by round ====
Round	1	2	3	4	5	6	7	8	9	10	11	12	13	14	15	16	17	18	19	20	21	22	23	24	25	26	27	28	29	30	31	32	33	34	35	36	37	38
Ground	H	A	H	A	H	A	H	A	H	A	H	H	A	H	A	A	H	A	H	A	H	A	H	A	H	A	H	A	H	A	A	H	A	H	H	A	H	A
Result	W	D	W	W	D	W	D	W	W	W	W	W	W	W	W	W	W	W	W	W	W	W	W	W	D	W	W	W	W	D	D	L	W	W	W	W	D	W
Position	4	4	3	1	3	2	1	1	1	1	2	1	1	1	1	1	1	1	1	1	1	1	1	1	1	1	1	1	1	1	1	1	1	1	1	1	1	1

Source: Competitive matches
A = Away; H = Home; W = Win; D = Draw; L = Loss; = Leader, UEFA Champions League Groups stage; = UEFA Champions League Groups stage; = UEFA Champions League Qualifying round; = 2007–08 UEFA Cup; = 2007–08 Serie B

==== Matches ====
9 September 2006 1	Fiorentina	2–3	Internazionale	Florence
20:30 CET	Toni 68', 79', (yellow card) 69'; Donadel (yellow card) 81'; Pasqual (yellow card) 88'	Report	Cambiasso 11', 41'; Ibrahimović 61', (yellow card) 90+4'	Stadium: Stadio Artemio Franchi; Attendance: 41,334; Referee: Roberto Rosetti

16 September 2006 2	Internazionale	1–1	Sampdoria	Milan
20:30 CET	Córdoba (yellow card) 35'; Stanković (yellow card) 41'; Materazzi (yellow card) 51'; Bonanni 80' (o.g.)	Report	Flachi 48' (pen.); Bonanni (yellow card) 81'; Sala (yellow card) 87'	Stadium: San Siro; Attendance: 45,194; Referee: Paolo Tagliavento

20 September 2006 3	Roma	0–1	Internazionale	Rome
20:30 CET	Panucci (yellow card) 39'; Mexès (yellow card) 54'; Perrotta (yellow card) 66'	Report	Vieira (yellow card) 15' (yellow-red card) 90+2'; Crespo 44'; Júlio César (yellow card) 80'	Stadium: Stadio Olimpico; Attendance: 57,157; Referee: Nicola Rizzoli

24 September 2006 4	Internazionale	4–3	Chievo	Milan
15:00 CET	Crespo 11', 70'; Solari (yellow card) 54'; Samuel 58'; Stanković 64', (yellow card) 65'	Report	Pellissier 77' (pen.); Tiribocchi 86'; Brighi 89'	Stadium: San Siro; Attendance: 41,357; Referee: Antonio Giannoccaro

1 October 2006 5	Cagliari	1–1	Internazionale	Cagliari
15:00 CET	Colucci 17'; Bianco (yellow card) 53'; Esposito (yellow card) 88'	Report	Grosso (yellow card) 16', (goal) 38'; Córdoba (yellow card) 58'; Maicon (yellow card) 82'; Dacourt (yellow card) 83'	Stadium: Stadio Sant'Elia; Attendance: 20,000; Referee: Domenico Messina

15 October 2006 6	Internazionale	2–1	Catania	Milan
15:00 CET	Córdoba (yellow card) 21'; Stanković 29', 75'	Report	Mascara 16'; Colucci (yellow card) 44'; Biaocco (yellow card) 61'; Minelli (yellow card) 68'	Stadium: San Siro; Attendance: 47,505; Referee: Paolo Mazzoleni

22 October 2006 7	Udinese	0–0	Internazionale	Udine
15:00 CET	Obodo (yellow card) 75'; Pinzi (yellow card) 90+3'	Report	Córdoba (yellow card) 8'; Stanković (yellow card) 58'; Figo (yellow card) 90+4'	Stadium: Stadio Friuli; Attendance: 19,969; Referee: Tiziano Pieri

25 October 2006 8	Internazionale	4–1	Livorno	Milan
20:30 CET	Pfertzel 2' (o.g.); Materazzi 13'; Ibrahimović 71'; Cruz 78'	Report	Pasquale (yellow card) 36'; C. Lucarelli 70'; César Prates (yellow card) 73'	Stadium: San Siro; Attendance: 39,057; Referee: Massimiliano Saccani

28 October 2006 9	Milan	3–4	Internazionale	Milan
20:30 CET	Gattuso (yellow card) 5'; Inzaghi (yellow card) 19'; Seedorf (yellow card) 30', (goal) 50'; Gilardino (yellow card) 51', (goal) 76'; Kaká 90+1'	Report	Vieira (yellow card) 3'; Crespo 17'; Stanković 22'; Ibrahimović 47'; Dacourt (yellow card) 54'; Materazzi 68', (yellow card) 55' (yellow-red card) 69'; Júlio César (yellow card) 88'; Burdisso (yellow card) 90+5'	Stadium: San Siro; Attendance: 78,921; Referee: Stefano Farina

5 November 2006 10	Internazionale	2–0	Ascoli	Milan
15:00 CET	Crespo (yellow card) 34'; Zanetti 41'; Cudini 53' (o.g.); Samuel (yellow card) 56'; Maicon (yellow card) 64'; Stanković (yellow card) 70'	Report	Fini (yellow card) 73'; Minieri (yellow card) 90+2'	Stadium: San Siro; Attendance: 43,372; Referee: Luca Banti

12 November 2006 11	Parma	1–2	Internazionale	Parma
20:30 CET	Budan 27'; Contini (yellow card) 36'; Couto (yellow card) 86'; Coly (yellow card) 89'	Report	Ibrahimović 16', (yellow card) 89' (yellow-red card) 90+4'; Vieira (yellow card) 38'; Dacourt (yellow card) 85'; Cruz 90+2'	Stadium: Stadio Ennio Tardini; Attendance: 20,488; Referee: Massimiliano Saccani

19 November 2006 12	Internazionale	1–0	Reggina	Milan
15:00 CET	Crespo 4'; Samuel (yellow card) 20'; Burdisso (yellow card) 26'	Report	Aronica (yellow card) 56'; Mesto (yellow card) 81'; Ríos (yellow card) 84'	Stadium: San Siro; Attendance: 43,772; Referee: Gianluca Rocchi

26 November 2006 13	Palermo	1–2	Internazionale	Palermo
20:30 CET	Amauri 45+1'; Guana (yellow card) 68'	Report	Ibrahimović 7'; Vieira 61'; Stanković (yellow card) 80'	Stadium: Stadio Renzo Barbera; Attendance: 34,095; Referee: Roberto Rosetti

2 December 2006 14	Internazionale	2–0	Siena	Milan
18:00 CET	Burdisso 11'; Maicon (yellow card) 49'; Crespo 64'; Vieira (yellow card) 70'	Report	Molinaro (yellow card) 53'; Brevi (yellow card) 65'; Antonini (yellow card) 70'; Codrea (yellow card) 90+1'	Stadium: San Siro; Attendance: 42,299; Referee: Andrea De Marco

10 December 2006 15	Empoli	0–3	Internazionale	Empoli
15:00 CET	Raggi (yellow card) 17'; Saudati (yellow card) 27'	Report	Ibrahimović (yellow card) 9', (goal) 78'; Crespo 60'; Stanković (yellow card) 68'; Materazzi (yellow card) 76'; Samuel 87'	Stadium: Stadio Carlo Castellani; Attendance: 11,473; Referee: Nicola Ayroldi

17 December 2006 16	Internazionale	2–0	Messina	Milan
15:00 CET	Materazzi (yellow card) 45+4', (goal) 49'; Maxwell (yellow card) 53'; Ibrahimović 59'	Report	De Vezze (yellow card) 18'; Zoro (yellow card) 51'	Stadium: San Siro; Attendance: 41,683; Referee: Nicola Stefanini

20 December 2006 17	Lazio	0–2	Internazionale	Rome
20:30 CET	Mudingayi (yellow card) 50'; Oddo (yellow card) 72'; Pandev (yellow card) 88'	Report	Ibrahimović (yellow card) 24' (yellow-red card) 45+2'; Cambiasso 39'; Materazzi (yellow card) 53', (goal) 85'; Maicon (yellow card) 88'	Stadium: Stadio Olimpico; Attendance: 35,203; Referee: Gianluca Rocchi

23 December 2006 18	Internazionale	2–1	Atalanta	Milan
15:00 CET	Vieira (yellow card) 37'; Crespo (yellow card) 45'; Adriano 65'; Loria 75' (o.g.)	Report	Doni 16'; Donati (yellow card) 44'; Carrozzieri (yellow card) 54'; Ariatti (yellow card) 69'; Zampagna (yellow card) 90+5'	Stadium: San Siro; Attendance: 49,659; Referee: Paolo Bertini

13 January 2007 19	Torino	1–3	Internazionale	Turin
20:30 CET	Lazetić (yellow card) 20'; Ardito (yellow card) 26'; Fiore 58'; Balestri (yellow card) 65'; Abbiati (red card) 83'	Report	Adriano 24'; Figo (yellow card) 35'; Vieira (yellow card) 39'; Ibrahimović 60'; Materazzi 85'	Stadium: Stadio Olimpico Grande Torino; Attendance: 23,695; Referee: Massimiliano Saccani

21 January 2007 20	Internazionale	3–1	Fiorentina	Milan
15:00 CET	Stanković 19', (yellow card) 79'; Adriano 24'; Burdisso (yellow card) 65'; Ibrahimović 70'	Report	Toni 5'; Potenza (yellow card) 74'; Montolivo (yellow card) 76'	Stadium: San Siro; Attendance: 61,391; Referee: Emidio Morganti

28 January 2007 21	Sampdoria	0–2	Internazionale	Genoa
20:30 CET	Delvecchio (red card) 7'; Sala (yellow card) 9'; Parola (yellow card) 57'; Zenoni (yellow card) 69'	Report	Ibrahimović 38'; Maicon 75'	Stadium: Stadio Luigi Ferraris; Attendance: 27,519; Referee: Nicola Rizzoli

11 February 2007 22	Chievo	0–2	Internazionale	Verona
15:00 CET	Mandelli (yellow card) 28'; Lanna (yellow card) 89'	Report	Adriano 1'; Crespo 51'; Materazzi (yellow card) 65'	Stadium: Stadio Marc'Antonio Bentegodi; Referee: Domenico Messina

17 February 2007 23	Internazionale	1–0	Cagliari	Milan
15:00 CET	Burdisso 11'; Dacourt (yellow card) 30'; Córdoba (yellow card) 68'	Report	Marchini (yellow card) 53'; Conti (yellow card) 85'	Stadium: San Siro; Attendance: 35,152; Referee: Matteo Trefoloni

25 February 2007 24	Catania	2–5	Internazionale	Cesena
15:00 CET	Spinesi 65', (red card) 88'; Baiocco (yellow card) 73'; Corona 74'	Report	Samuel 45'; Stanković (yellow card) 45+2'; Solari 49'; Grosso 56'; Ibrahimović 67'; Cruz 78'	Stadium: Stadio Dino Manuzzi; Referee: Paolo Bertini

28 February 2007 25	Internazionale	1–1	Udinese	Milan
20:30 CET	Crespo 66'; Burdisso (yellow card) 90+1'	Report	Obodo 47'; Natali (yellow card) 58'; De Sanctis (yellow card) 59'	Stadium: San Siro; Attendance: 38,496; Referee: Mauro Bergonzi

3 March 2007 26	Livorno	1–2	Internazionale	Livorno
15:00 CET	C. Lucarelli 27'; Passoni (yellow card) 64'	Report	Materazzi (yellow card) 26'; Cruz 35'; Dacourt (yellow card) 45+1'; Ibrahimović 56'; Figo (yellow card) 70'; Maicon (yellow card) 83' (yellow-red card) 83'	Stadium: Stadio Armando Picchi; Attendance: 5,641; Referee: Emidio Morganti

11 March 2007 27	Internazionale	2–1	Milan	Milan
15:00 CET	Ibrahimović (yellow card) 30', (goal) 75'; Cruz 54'; Samuel (yellow card) 71'; Córdoba (yellow card) 86'	Report	Ronaldo 40'; Pirlo (yellow card) 72'	Stadium: San Siro; Attendance: 63,681; Referee: Nicola Rizzoli

18 March 2007 28	Ascoli	1–2	Internazionale	Ascoli Piceno
15:00 CET	Corallo (yellow card) 10'; Foglio (yellow card) 19'; Lombardi (yellow card) 44'; Năstase (yellow card) 68'; Bonanni 90+3' (pen.)	Report	Zanetti (yellow card) 15'; Maicon (yellow card) 17'; Ibrahimović (yellow card) 21', (goal) 65', 73'; Stanković (yellow card) 85'; Samuel (yellow card) 90+2'	Stadium: Stadio Cino e Lillo Del Duca; Attendance: 4,800; Referee: Roberto Rosetti

1 April 2007 29	Internazionale	2–0	Parma	Milan
15:00 CET	Maxwell 56'; Adriano (yellow card) 59'; Crespo 70'; Materazzi (yellow card) 75'	Report	Paci (yellow card) 42'; Dessena (yellow card) 46'; Domenico Morfeo (yellow card) 77'	Stadium: San Siro; Attendance: 48,888; Referee: Stefano Farina

7 April 2007 30	Reggina	0–0	Internazionale	Reggio Calabria
15:00 CET	Vigiani (yellow card) 37'	Report	Cruz (yellow card) 25'; Córdoba (yellow card) 58'	Stadium: Stadio Oreste Granillo; Attendance: 18,500; Referee: Paolo Bertini

15 April 2007 31	Internazionale	2–2	Palermo	Milan
20:30 CET	Cruz (yellow card) 62', (goal) 67'; Adriano 74'	Report	Caracciolo 3', (yellow card) 25'; Cavani (yellow card) 31'; Zaccardo 45+1'; Giacomazzi (yellow card) 75'	Stadium: San Siro; Attendance: 46,611; Referee: Nicola Rizzoli

18 April 2007 32	Internazionale	1–3	Roma	Milan
17:30 CET	Figo (yellow card) 28'; Zanetti (yellow card) 48'; Materazzi 52' (pen.), (yellow card) 83'; Stanković (yellow card) 77'	Report	Perrotta 44'; Mancini (yellow card) 51'; Pizarro (yellow card) 53'; Mexès (yellow card) 54'; Totti 89'; Doni (yellow card) 90+2'; Cassetti 90+5'	Stadium: San Siro; Attendance: 56,577; Referee: Matteo Trefoloni

22 April 2007 33	Siena	1–2	Internazionale	Siena
15:00 CET	Negro 21'; Manninger (yellow card) 58'; Vergassola (yellow card) 86'	Report	Burdisso (yellow card) 48'; Materazzi 18', 60' (pen.), (yellow card) 61'	Stadium: Stadio Artemio Franchi – Montepaschi Arena; Attendance: 14,027; Referee: Nicola Airoldi

29 April 2007 34	Internazionale	3–1	Empoli	Milan
20:30 CET	Cruz 27'; Stanković (yellow card) 49', (goal) 60'; Recoba 59', (yellow card) 59'	Report	Saudati 57'	Stadium: San Siro; Attendance: 61,839; Referee: Antonio Damato

6 May 2007 35	Messina	0–1	Internazionale	Messina
15:00 CET	Masiello (yellow card) 69'; Di Napoli (penalty missed)	Report	Dacourt (yellow card) 42'; González (yellow card) 45'; Córdoba (yellow card) 62'; Crespo 73'; Vieira (yellow card) 81'	Stadium: Stadio San Filippo; Attendance: 13,410; Referee: Domenico Celi

13 May 2007 36	Internazionale	4–3	Lazio	Milan
15:00 CET	Crespo 20', 35', 83'; Burdisso (yellow card) 39'; Materazzi 85', (yellow card) 85'	Report	Pandev 3'; Mutarelli 4', (yellow card) 58'; Mudingayi (yellow card) 7'; Ledesma 41'; Siviglia (red card) 82'; Zauri (yellow card) 90+3'	Stadium: San Siro; Attendance: 45,429; Referee: Luca Banti

20 May 2007 37	Atalanta	1–1	Internazionale	Bergamo
15:00 CET	Ferreira Pinto 10', (yellow card) 11'; Abeijón (yellow card) 20'; Rivalta (yellow card) 24'; Carrozzieri (yellow card) 64'	Report	Figo 48' (pen.)	Stadium: Stadio Atleti Azzurri d'Italia; Attendance: 22,899; Referee: Andrea Romeo

27 May 2007 38	Internazionale	3–0	Torino	Milan
15:00 CET	Materazzi 12' (pen.); Maicon 60', (yellow card) 62'; Figo 67' (pen.)	Report	Taibi (yellow card) 13'; Comotto (yellow card) 25'	Stadium: San Siro; Attendance: 64,758; Referee: Daniele Orsato

=== Coppa Italia ===
==== Round of 16 ====
9 November 2006 First leg	Messina	0–1	Internazionale	Messina
20:30 CET		Report	Cruz 40'	Stadium: Stadio San Filippo; Attendance: 12,000; Referee: Nicola Stefanini

29 November 2006 Second leg	Internazionale	4–0 (5–0 agg.)	Messina	Milan
21:00 CET	Burdisso 27', 71'; González 37'; Andreolli 71'	Report		Stadium: San Siro; Referee: Francesco Squillace

==== Quarter-finals ====
9 January 2007 First leg	Empoli	0–2	Internazionale	Empoli
21:00 CET		Report	Adriano 71'; Córdoba 90+1'	Stadium: Stadio Carlo Castellani; Referee: Emidio Morganti

17 January 2007 Second leg	Internazionale	2–0 (4–0 agg.)	Empoli	Milan
21:00 CET	Cambiasso 28'; Grosso 77'	Report		Stadium: San Siro; Referee: Francesco Squillace

==== Semi-finals ====
24 January 2007 First leg	Sampdoria	0–3	Internazionale	Genoa
21:00 CET		Report	Burdisso 9', 55'; Crespo 24'	Stadium: Stadio Luigi Ferraris; Referee: Paolo Tagliavento

1 February 2007 Second leg	Internazionale	0–0 (3–0 agg.)	Sampdoria	Milan
21:00 CET		Report		Stadium: San Siro; Referee: Christian Brighi

==== Final ====
9 May 2007 First leg	Roma	6–2	Internazionale	Rome
17:00 CET	Totti 1'; De Rossi 6'; Perrotta 16'; Mancini 30'; Panucci 54', 89'	Report	Crespo 20', 56'	Stadium: Stadio Olimpico; Attendance: 39,095; Referee: Massimiliano Saccani

17 May 2007 Second leg	Internazionale	2–1 (4–7 agg.)	Roma	Milan
16:30 CET	Crespo 50'; Cruz 56'	Report	Perrotta 83'	Stadium: San Siro; Attendance: 26,606; Referee: Emidio Morganti

=== Supercoppa Italiana ===
26 August 2006	Internazionale	4–3 (a.e.t.)	Roma	Milan
20:45 CET	Cambiasso (yellow card) 14'; Vieira (yellow card) 30', (goal) 44', 74'; Crespo 65'; Maicon (yellow card) 80'; Figo 95'	Report	Mancini 18'; Aquilani 25', 34'; Taddei (yellow card) 44'; Cassetti (yellow card) 70'; Chivu (red card) 100'; Mido (yellow card) 119'	Stadium: San Siro; Attendance: 45,528; Referee: Massimiliano Saccani

=== UEFA Champions League ===
==== Group stage ====
Pos	Team	Pld	W	D	L	GF	GA	GD	Pts	Qualification
1	(Germany) Bayern Munich	6	3	3	0	10	3	+7	12	Advance to knockout stage
2	(Italy) Internazionale	6	3	1	2	5	5	0	10	Advance to knockout stage
3	(Russia) Spartak Moscow	6	1	2	3	7	11	−4	5	Transfer to UEFA Cup
4	(Portugal) Sporting CP	6	1	2	3	3	6	−3	5	

Source: RSSSF

12 September 2006 1	Sporting CP (Portugal)	1–0	(Italy) Internazionale	Lisbon, Portugal
20:45 CET	Liédson (yellow card) 16'; Moutinho (yellow card) 21'; Caneira 64'	Report	Córdoba (yellow card) 27'; Toldo (yellow card) 32'; Vieira (yellow card) 44' (yellow-red card) 68'	Stadium: Estádio José Alvalade; Attendance: 30,222; Referee: Alain Hamer (Luxembourg)

27 September 2006 2	Internazionale (Italy)	0–2	(Germany) Bayern Munich	Milan, Italy
20:45 CET	Ibrahimović (yellow card) 41' (yellow-red card) 58'; Materazzi (yellow card) 54'; Grosso (red card) 85'	Report	Ottl (yellow card) 35'; Sagnol (yellow card) 40'; Scholl (yellow card) 76'; Pizarro 81'; Podolski 90+1'	Stadium: San Siro; Attendance: 79,000; Referee: Steve Bennett (England)

18 October 2006 3	Internazionale (Italy)	2–1	(Russia) Spartak Moscow	Milan, Italy
20:45 CET	Cruz 1', 9'; Figo (yellow card) 33'	Report	Rodríguez (yellow card) 32'; Pavlyuchenko 54'; Kalynychenko (yellow card) 81'	Stadium: San Siro; Attendance: 40,000; Referee: Bertrand Layec (France)

31 October 2006 4	Spartak Moscow (Russia)	0–1	(Italy) Internazionale	Moscow, Russia
18:30 CET		Report	Cruz 2'	Stadium: Luzhniki Stadium; Attendance: 60,001; Referee: Claus Bo Larsen (Denmark)

22 November 2006 5	Internazionale (Italy)	1–0	(Portugal) Sporting CP	Milan, Italy
20:45 CET	Maicon (yellow card) 19'; Crespo 36'; Stanković (yellow card) 69'	Report	Paredes (yellow card) 25'; Nani (yellow card) 56'; Custódio (yellow card) 81'	Stadium: San Siro; Attendance: 69,000; Referee: Frank De Bleeckere (Belgium)

5 December 2006 6	Bayern Munich (Germany)	1–1	(Italy) Internazionale	Munich, Germany
20:45 CET	Van Bommel (yellow card) 62'; Makaay 62'	Report	Samuel (yellow card) 68'; Vieira 90+1'	Stadium: Allianz Arena; Attendance: 66,000; Referee: Luis Medina Cantalejo (Spain)

==== Knockout phase ====
===== Round of 16 =====
21 February 2007 First leg	Internazionale (Italy)	2–2	(Spain) Valencia	Milan, Italy
20:45 CET	Cambiasso 29'; Maicon 76'; Burdisso (yellow card) 85'; Zanetti (yellow card) 89'	Report	Albelda (yellow card) 28'; Marchena (yellow card) 41'; Villa 64'; Silva 86'	Stadium: San Siro; Attendance: 65,000; Referee: Martin Hansson (Sweden)

6 March 2007 Second leg	Valencia (Spain)	0–0 (a2–2 agg.)	(Italy) Internazionale	Valencia, Spain
20:45 CET	Cañizares (yellow card) 30'; Angulo (yellow card) 69'	Report	Ibrahimović (yellow card) 30'; Materazzi (yellow card) 73'; Córdoba (yellow card) 79'; Maicon (yellow card) 88'	Stadium: Mestalla; Attendance: 53,000; Referee: Wolfgang Stark (Germany)

== Statistics ==
=== Squad statistics ===
	League	Europe	Cup	Others	Total Stats
Games played	38	8	8	1	55
Games won	30	3	6	1	40
Games drawn	7	3	1	0	11
Games lost	1	2	1	0	4
Goals scored	80	7	16	4	107
Goals conceded	34	7	7	3	51
Goal difference	46	0	9	1	56
Clean sheets	15	3	6	0	24
Goal by substitute	–	–	–	–	–
Total shots	–	–	–	–	–
Shots on target	–	–	–	–	–
Corners	–	–	–	–	–
Players used	25	23	31	14	–
Offsides	–	–	–	–	–
Fouls suffered	–	–	–	–	–
Fouls committed	–	–	–	–	–
Yellow cards	84	15	9	3	112
Red cards	5	4	1	–	10

Last updated: 27 May 2007
Source: Serie A statistics, UEFA Champions League statistics, Coppa Italia statistics

=== Appearances and goals ===
As of 31 June 2006

No.	Pos	Nat	Player	Total		Serie A		Coppa Italia		Champions League	
No.	Pos	Nat	Player	Apps	Goals	Apps	Goals	Apps	Goals	Apps	Goals
12	GK	(Brazil) BRA	Júlio César	38	0	32	0	0	0	6	0
13	DF	(Brazil) BRA	Maicon	43	3	27+5	2	3	0	8	1
23	DF	(Italy) ITA	Materazzi	36	10	27+1	10	2	0	6	0
2	DF	(Colombia) COL	Cordoba	41	1	25+4	0	4+1	1	7	0
11	DF	(Italy) ITA	Grosso	34	3	22+1	2	4+1	1	3+3	0
4	MF	(Argentina) ARG	Zanetti J	49	1	34+3	1	4	0	7+1	0
14	MF	(France) FRA	Vieira	27	2	19+1	1	2+1	0	4	1
5	MF	(Serbia) SRB	Stankovic	43	6	31+3	6	2	0	7	0
7	AM	(Portugal) POR	Figo	46	2	19+13	2	7	0	6+1	0
8	FW	(Sweden) SWE	Ibrahimovic	35	15	25+2	15	1	0	7	0
18	FW	(Argentina) ARG	Crespo	39	19	22+7	14	4	4	4+2	1
1	GK	(Italy) ITA	Toldo	16	0	6	0	8	0	2	0
16	DF	(Argentina) ARG	Burdisso	36	6	19+5	2	7	4	3+2	0
15	MF	(France) FRA	Dacourt	36	0	18+6	0	5	0	6+1	0
19	MF	(Argentina) ARG	Cambiasso	28	5	18+3	3	4+1	1	1+1	1
10	FW	(Brazil) BRA	Adriano	28	6	14+9	5	3	1	1+1	0
6	DF	(Brazil) BRA	Maxwell	29	1	14+8	1	4+1	0	2	0
21	MF	(Argentina) ARG	Solari	30	1	12+9	1	5	0	1+3	0
25	DF	(Argentina) ARG	Samuel	26	3	12+6	3	5	0	2+1	0
9	FW	(Argentina) ARG	Julio Cruz	23	12	8+7	7	2+2	2	2+2	3
20	FW	(Uruguay) URU	Recoba	18	1	6+7	1	0+3	0	1+1	0
91	MF	(Argentina) ARG	Gonzalez	24	1	4+10	0	6+1	1	1+2	0
77	DF	(Italy) ITA	Andreolli	7	1	4	0	2	1	1	0
50	MF	(Belgium) BEL	Maaroufi	6	0	0+1	0	4+1	0	0	0
99	FW	(Greece) GRE	Choutos	3	0	0+1	0	0+2	0	0	0
22	GK	(Italy) ITA	Orlandoni	0	0	0	0	0	0	0	0
36	DF	(Italy) ITA	Fautario	2	0	0	0	0+2	0	0	0
51	DF	(Italy) ITA	Bonucci	3	0	0	0	1+2	0	0	0
47	MF	(Italy) ITA	Bolzoni	1	0	0	0	0+1	0	0	0
57	MF	(Hungary) HUN	Filkor	2	0	0	0	0+2	0	0	0
58	MF	(France) FRA	Biabiany	1	0	0	0	0+1	0	0	0
60	FW	(Uruguay) URU	Ribas	1	0	0	0	0+1	0	0	0
61	FW	(Sweden) SWE	Slavkovski	1	0	0	0	0+1	0	0	0

=== Goalscorers ===
No.	Pos.	Nation	Name	Serie A	Coppa Italia	Supercoppa Italiana	Champions League	Total
18	FW	(Argentina)	Hernán Crespo	14	4	1	1	20
8	FW	(Sweden)	Zlatan Ibrahimović	15	0	0	0	15
9	FW	(Argentina)	Julio Cruz	7	2	0	3	12
23	DF	(Italy)	Marco Materazzi	10	0	0	0	10
5	MF	(Serbia)	Dejan Stanković	6	0	0	0	6
10	FW	(Brazil)	Adriano	5	1	0	0	6
16	DF	(Argentina)	Nicolás Burdisso	2	4	0	0	6
19	MF	(Argentina)	Esteban Cambiasso	3	1	0	1	5
14	MF	(France)	Patrick Vieira	1	0	2	1	4
7	MF	(Portugal)	Luís Figo	2	0	1	0	3
11	DF	(Italy)	Fabio Grosso	2	1	0	0	3
13	DF	(Brazil)	Maicon	2	0	0	1	3
2	DF	(Colombia)	Iván Córdoba	0	1	0	0	1
4	DF	(Argentina)	Javier Zanetti	1	0	0	0	1
6	DF	(Brazil)	Maxwell	1	0	0	0	1
20	FW	(Argentina)	Álvaro Recoba	1	0	0	0	1
21	MF	(Argentina)	Santiago Solari	1	0	0	0	1
77	DF	(Italy)	Marco Andreolli	0	1	0	0	1
91	MF	(Argentina)	Mariano González	0	1	0	0	1
#	Own goals			2	0	0	0	2
TOTAL				80	16	4	7	107

Last updated: 27 May 2007

== Sources ==
- Official website
