= Ibrahim Maaroufi =

Moroccan footballer

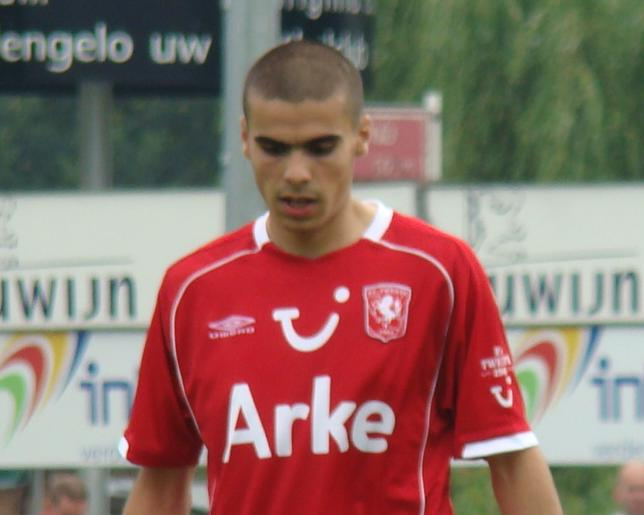
- Maaroufi with Twente

Personal information
- Date of birth: 18 January 1989 (age 37)
- Place of birth: Brussels, Belgium
- Height: 1.83 m (6 ft 0 in)
- Position: Midfielder

Youth career
- –2000: Anderlecht
- 2000–2006: PSV

Senior career*
Years	Team	Apps	(Gls)
2006–2009	Inter Milan	6	(0)
2008–2009	→ Twente (loan)	0	(0)
2009	Vicenza	0	(0)
2009–2010	Bellinzona	0	(0)
2010	MVV	0	(0)
2010	Wydad Casablanca	2	(0)
2011	Eupen	1	(0)
2011–2012	Racing Mechelen	12	(3)
2012	Parseh Tehran	13	(0)
2012–2013	Union SG	12	(2)
2013–2014	Maghreb de Fès	5	(1)
2014–2015	Paganese	2	(0)
2015–2017	Renaissance Schaerbeek	20	(6)
2017–2018	Toulouse Rodéo	4	(0)

International career
2007	Morocco U21	5	(0)
2007–2012	Morocco U23	5	(2)
- * Club domestic league appearances and goals

Ibrahim Maaroufi (Arabic: ابراهيم معروفي; born 18 January 1989) is a Moroccan former professional footballer who played as a midfielder.

He represented both Morocco U23 and Belgium U21 national teams at international level. In October 2007 Maaroufi declared himself for Morocco rather than Belgium.

== Club career ==
Maaroufi started his career with Belgian team Anderlecht before moving to Dutch side PSV Eindhoven.

=== Inter Milan ===
Maaroufi was called up to the Inter Milan first team many times by Roberto Mancini, but finally made his first team and Serie A debut against Livorno, 25 October 2006, as a substitute for Dejan Stanković in the 82nd minute, becoming the second youngest player in the history of Inter, older than Goran Slavkovski but younger than Giuseppe Bergomi.

He played his first Coppa Italia match as a starter for Inter Milan on 9 November 2006, against Messina Peloro. He also played the return leg. In total Maaroufi made six appearances for Inter with one coming in Serie A and five appearances coming in the Coppa Italia.

=== Twente loan ===
At the start of 2008–09 season Maaroufi moved on loan to Twente to gain more experience when he was signed by Fred Rutten who had previously coached him at PSV Eindhoven. Rutten left the club to join Schalke 04 and was replaced by Steve McLaren soon after.

=== Vicenza ===
In February 2009, the last day of transfer window, Maaroufi was sold to Vicenza in joint-ownership bid. He picked up a knee injury which ruled him out of some games. He was released by Vicenza in mutual consent on 24 August 2009.

=== Bellinzona ===
On 31 August 2009, Maaroufi agreed a three-year contract with Swiss Super League outfit Bellinzona.

=== MVV Maastricht ===
In February 2010 Maaroufi agreed to return to the Netherlands, joining Eerste Divisie club MVV Maastricht on a free transfer, only to leave it at the end of the season; both experiences ended with no first team appearances.

=== Wydad Casablanca ===
On 1 June 2010, Maaroufi signed a two-year contract with Moroccan champions Wydad Casablanca. He was however released later in December, after appearing in two league games.

=== Eupen ===
In January 2011, Belgian Pro League club Eupen announced the signing of Maaroufi on a free transfer. He made one first team appearance, coming as a second-half substitute in a 1–0 home defeat to Standard Liège in February. He was also an unused substitute on four occasions before being released by Eupen at the end of the season.

=== Racing Mechelen ===
In August 2011, Maaroufi joined Leeds United on trial. He played for Leeds reserves against Farsley Celtic on 6 August.

=== Parseh Tehran ===
In 2014, Maaroufi played for Parseh Tehran in an attempt to be noticed by scouts and relaunch his career.

=== Paganese ===
On 27 October 2014, Maaroufi was signed by Italian Lega Pro club Paganese on a free transfer.

=== Renaissance Schaerbeek ===
Between 2015 and 2017, Maaroufi played for Renaissance Schaerbeek in the Belgian Provincial 1.

=== Toulouse Rodéo and trials ===
In March 2017, Maaroufi joined French club Toulouse Rodéo in the fifth-tier Championnat National 3.

After leaving the club in 2018, he trialled with Dutch Eerste Divisie club FC Eindhoven, without success.

== International career ==
Maaroufi played for both Belgium and Morocco in youth level. He trained with the Morocco Olympics team in December 2006, before making his debut for Belgium U21 national team against Sint-Truiden in February 2007. He was also called up for the match against Serbia in March 2007.

He played his last Belgian U21 cap against Austria U21, on 7 September 2007.

Maaroufi said originally he would accept a call up to Morocco Under-23s only if he was made captain. He then accepted a call-up from Morocco Olympics team again, for 2008 CAF Men's Pre-Olympic Tournament in October 2007, versus Cameroon. In October 2007 Maaroufi declared himself for Morocco rather than Belgium .

== Personal life ==
In March 2016, it was revealed that Khalid El Bakraoui, one of the suicide bombers of the 2016 Brussels bombings, had used the identity of Maaroufi in order to gain access to Belgium and rent the apartment from which the attacks in Brussels and as well as the November 2015 Paris attacks were planned.

== Honours ==
Inter Milan

- Serie A: 2006–07, 2007–08
- Supercoppa Italiana: 2005–06
