= José Maria =

José Maria, usually the Portuguese equivalent of the Spanish given name José María, may refer to:

- José Maria Alkmin (1901–1974), Vice-President of Brazil from 1964 to 1967
- José Maria de Eça de Queirós (1845–1900), Portuguese writer
- José Maria de Santo Agostinho (died 1912), Brazilian religious leader born Miguel Boaventura Lucena
- José Maria Marin (born 1932), Brazilian politician and former sports administrator who was the President of the Brazilian Football Confederation
- José Maria Rodrigues Alves (born 1949), footballer, 1970 FIFA World Cup champion, known as "Zé Maria"
- José Marcelo Ferreira (born 1973), footballer, bronze medal at the 1996 Summer Olympics, known as "Zé Maria"
- José Maria de Almeida (born 1957), political activist, leader of the PSTU, known as "Zé Maria"

== See also ==
- José María
- Zé María
