= Chema =

Chema is a common nickname for the Spanish given name José María (an alternative to the short form José Mari), and less commonly for José Manuel (or Josema).

== People ==
The name Chema may refer to:

- Chema (footballer born 1976), Spanish football midfielder, real name José Manuel Jiménez Sancho
- Chema (footballer born 1980), Spanish football goalkeeper, real name José María Giménez Pérez
- Chema (footballer, born 1992), Spanish football defender, real name José Manuel Rodríguez Benito
- Chema (footballer, born 1997), Spanish football midfielder, real name José Manuel Núñez Martín
- Chema Madoz, Spanish photographer, real name Jose Maria Rodriguez Madoz
- Chema Martínez, Spanish long-distance runner, real name José Manuel Martínez Fernández
- Chema Mato, Spanish football midfielder, real name José María Mato Nieto
- Chema Rodríguez (filmmaker) (born 1967), Spanish filmmaker and writer
- Chema Rodríguez (handballer) (born 1980), Spanish handball player
- El Chema (character), fictional character in television series, full name José María Venegas
- El Chema, television series based on the life of the above character
- José María Antón, Spanish football defender
- José María Torre, Mexican actor
- Thomas V. Chema, American academic administrator and lawyer

== Txema ==
Txema, a Basque spelling variant of the name also exists, and may refer to:

- Txema Alonso, Spanish football defender, real name José María Alonso Fernández
- Txema Añibarro, Spanish football midfielder, real name José María Añibarro Astondoa
- Txema del Olmo, Spanish cyclist, full name José María del Olmo Zendegi
- Txema Garcia, Spanish/Andorran football defender, real name José Manuel García Luena
- Txema Guijarro García, Spanish politician, full name José María Guijarro García
- Txema Mazet-Brown, a British-New Zealand snowboarder
- Txema Noriega, Spanish football forward, full name José María Noriega Aldekoa

== Places ==
- Chema, Tibet, a village in the Chumbi Valley, Yadong County of Tibet
