= Patrick Vieira =

French football player and manager (born 1976)

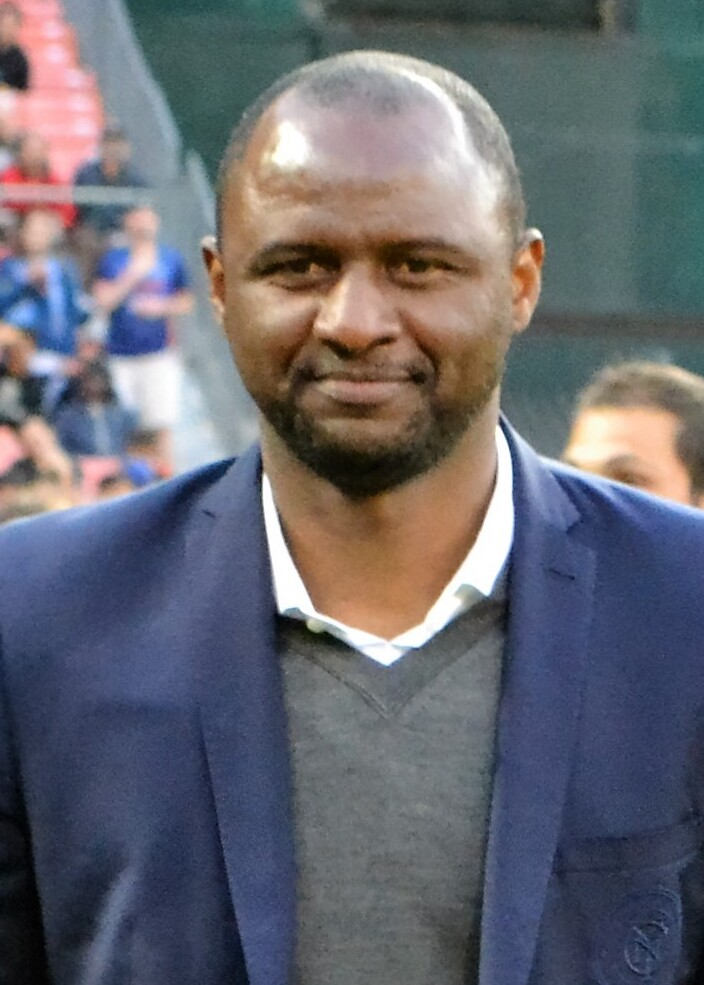
- Vieira with New York City FC in 2016

Personal information
- Full name: Patrick Paul Vieira
- Date of birth: 23 June 1976 (age 50)
- Place of birth: Dakar, Senegal
- Height: 1.92 m (6 ft 4 in)
- Position: Midfielder

Team information
- Current team: Senegal (head coach)

Youth career
- 1984–1986: Trappes
- 1986–1991: Drouais
- 1991–1993: Tours

Senior career*
Years	Team	Apps	(Gls)
1993–1995	Cannes	49	(2)
1995–1996	AC Milan	2	(0)
1996–2005	Arsenal	279	(29)
2005–2006	Juventus	31	(5)
2006–2010	Inter Milan	67	(6)
2010–2011	Manchester City	28	(3)
Total		456	(45)

International career
1995–1996	France U21	7	(0)
1997–2009	France	107	(6)

Managerial career
- 2016–2018: New York City FC
- 2018–2020: Nice
- 2021–2023: Crystal Palace
- 2023–2024: Strasbourg
- 2024–2025: Genoa
- 2026–: Senegal
Medal record
Men's football
Representing France
FIFA World Cup
Winner	1998
Runner-up	2006
UEFA European Championship
Winner	2000
FIFA Confederations Cup
Winner	2001
- * Club domestic league appearances and goals

Patrick Paul Vieira (French: [patʁik vjɛʁa]; born 23 June 1976) is a French professional football manager and former player who is the head coach of the Senegal national team. Widely regarded as among the best players of his generation and one of the greatest midfielders of all time, he was named in the FIFA 100 of the greatest living footballers in 2004.

Vieira began his playing career at Cannes, where several standout performances garnered him a move to Serie A club AC Milan. In 1996, he relocated to England to join fellow countryman Arsène Wenger at Arsenal for a fee of £3.5 million. During his nine-year stint in the Premier League, Vieira established himself as a dominating box-to-box midfielder, noted for his aggressive and highly competitive style of play, an attitude that also helped him excel as captain of the club from 2002 until his departure in 2005. He helped Arsenal achieve a sustained period of success during his time at the club, where he lifted four FA Cups and three league titles, including one unbeaten. He was named in the Premier League PFA Team of the Year for six consecutive years from 1999 to 2004. He returned to Italy, playing for Juventus, but quickly departed after the club was relegated as punishment for its part in the Calciopoli scandal. He then signed for Inter Milan, where he consecutively won four league titles, before featuring for Manchester City, where he won another FA Cup, before retiring in 2011.

Born in Senegal, Vieira represented France at international level. He initially played for the under-21 team before making his debut for the senior team in 1997. Over a period of twelve years, including time as team captain, he made 107 appearances for the side. He played in the finals of France's victories at the 1998 World Cup and Euro 2000. He also appeared at the 2002 and 2006 World Cups, as well as Euro 2004 and Euro 2008, before retiring from international football in 2010.

Following retirement, Vieira transitioned into coaching and took charge of the academy at Manchester City in 2013. He departed two years later to become manager of Major League Soccer club New York City FC. He subsequently managed Ligue 1 club Nice between 2018 and 2020, Premier League side Crystal Palace between 2021 and 2023, and Ligue 1 club Strasbourg between 2023 and 2024. In 2024, he became manager of Italian club Genoa, but left by mutual consent in November 2025 with the team at the bottom of the table.

== Early life ==
Patrick Paul Vieira was born on 23 June 1976 in Dakar, Senegal. Vieira's family moved to Dreux, France, when he was eight, and he did not return to Senegal until 2003. His parents divorced when Vieira was young, and he never met his father again. His French citizenship was conferred on him at birth as his grandfather served in the French Army. His surname Vieira, which is Portuguese, is the maiden name of his mother, who is from Cape Verde.

== Club career ==
=== Early career ===
Vieira first played for Tours U19 in the early 1990s, before moving to Cannes, where he made his debut at the age of 17, in 1993, and captained the team at just 19 years old. In the summer of 1995, he was signed by Italian Serie A club AC Milan, although he made just five first-team appearances for the club.

=== Arsenal ===
==== First season (1996–97) ====
On 10 August 1996, the Daily Mirror reported that Vieira was subject to a move to English club Arsenal, given personal terms with original suitors Ajax were not reached. He joined Arsenal four days later in a £3.5 million move. The peculiarity of Vieira and fellow Frenchman Rémi Garde arriving at the club, coupled with manager Bruce Rioch's dismissal before the season had begun, suggested that Arsenal was managed by exterior influence. Vieira later revealed he signed for Arsenal because his compatriot Arsène Wenger was going to be the club's next manager: "I am delighted to be joining Arsenal at the same time as Mr Wenger becomes their coach. Being able to speak French to him will make life a lot easier for me." Wenger was officially in command of managerial affairs at Arsenal by the start of October, but Vieira had already made his mark, coming on as a substitute against Sheffield Wednesday on 16 September 1996; The Times described him as a "thinking man's Carlton Palmer … who, at last, gives the Arsenal midfield some variety."

"It's been a while since we've had a midfield player who looks at the front man's run first and then looks at other options. He makes dream passes forward and he's already put me in several times."

— Ian Wright, November 1996

Vieira made his full debut against Middlesbrough at the Riverside Stadium, three days after. He scored his first goal for the club against Derby County on 8 December 1996 – a late equaliser in a 2–2 draw. His performances for Arsenal in the subsequent months made him a fans' favourite and was lauded as "the playmaker Arsenal have sought since Paul Davis pulled the strings in the 1991 championship-winning team". Davis himself noted that in the matches Vieira was suspended during the Christmas period, Arsenal struggled to win. He ended his first season with 38 appearances in total and Arsenal finished in third place, missing out on a spot in the UEFA Champions League via goal difference.

==== Two "doubles" (1997–2002) ====
Vieira's partnership with international teammate Emmanuel Petit the following season was instrumental in helping Arsenal complete a domestic league and cup double. Vieira scored his first goal of the campaign against Manchester United in a 3–2 victory on 9 November 1997. Vieira twisted his knee during the match, and was ruled out from playing for a month. He returned for the trip at Wimbledon on 22 December 1997, which was postponed due to floodlight problems. In a game against Coventry City on 17 January 1998, Vieira received his first red card for using "foul and abusive language" at referee Stephen Lodge. Vieira was again dismissed a month later, this time in a League Cup semi-final against Chelsea, a decision which Wenger described as "absolutely ridiculous". Towards the finishing straight of the campaign, Vieira helped Arsenal make ground on league leaders Manchester United and his card record had improved, "with only one booking in the latter stages of the season". After a successful World Cup campaign with the national team, Vieira had another productive season at Arsenal in 1998–99. Although Arsenal failed to retain the Premier League, Vieira's endeavour was rewarded – he was named in the PFA Team of the Year alongside Petit.

Against West Ham United on 2 October 1999, Vieira was sent off for a second booking, after fouling striker Paolo Di Canio. Moments after, he spat at Neil Ruddock, who walked into him and was dragged off the pitch by officials. Vieira was subsequently charged, banned for six matches and fined a record £45,000 by The Football Association. The season ended in disappointment for both Vieira and Arsenal, as the team finished 18 points behind champions Manchester United, in second place. Arsenal reached the 2000 UEFA Cup Final, in which Vieira played. But the team lost the match on penalties against Galatasaray; Vieira's spot kick hit the post.

Disciplinary problems continued to beset Vieira in the 2000–01 season. He was sent off on the opening day against Sunderland, and for the second time in 72 hours at home to Liverpool. Vieira scored two goals, the following match against Charlton Athletic, in what was his final appearance before a five-match suspension. It was feared that Vieira was prepared to turn his back on English football, as he felt victimised – Wenger, several Arsenal players and fans supported him publicly. After the ban, Vieira himself expressed his desire to remain at Arsenal but noted he could never alter his style of play "because, basically, I don't want to change. I really enjoy English football and the life in England. I am happy here."

After a group stage match against Lazio in October 2000, Vieira claimed he was the target of racial abuse from Siniša Mihajlović, which UEFA subsequently launched an investigation into. Mihajlović later admitted he made reference to Vieira's ethnicity, but added that he was provoked. The player was then handed a two-match ban for "unsporting actions". Given Arsenal that finished behind Manchester United in the league for a third consecutive season, Vieira was reluctant to commit himself to the club, and described the season, up until April 2001, as "average". Despite how mature his performances had become since Petit left, he criticised Arsenal's decision to sell him and Marc Overmars to Barcelona: "Of course it was good business but it was a big disappointment for me. If we still had the same team now and put Overmars and Petit in it, we would be even better and stronger. It's not that I miss Petit – the team needs him."

In May 2001, The Daily Telegraph reported that Manchester United was planning an "audacious" attempt to sign Vieira; manager Sir Alex Ferguson, a long-term admirer of the player, was given the green light by his board to make a bid. In the summer period, Vieira disparaged Arsenal's transfer activity and was adamant the club would not finish "in the top five in the league – and forget the Champions League," saying about his future: "As far as I'm concerned, the matter is resolved. I am leaving Arsenal and I have made that perfectly clear." The club refused to respond to his comments, but vice-chairman David Dein was privately irked at Vieira's agent, Marc Roger, for letting the situation become unsettling. Wenger attributed the saga at the hands of Manchester United: "[They] made an approach to Patrick without contacting us, and that does not really respect the rules." Vieira turned up for pre-season training in July 2001 as normal, and was later named the club vice-captain, to ensure he would succeed Tony Adams as captain. Success finally came for Vieira in the 2001–02 season; Arsenal regained the league and beat Chelsea in the 2002 FA Cup Final to complete a second double.

==== Captaincy and "Invincibles" (2002–04) ====
Adams' retirement in May 2002 meant Vieira became club captain. He described the feeling as "daunting", but it was something he looked forward to: "Taking the responsibility on my shoulders is something I relish. It will make me a better, more mature footballer and a more mature person as well." Against Chelsea at Stamford Bridge in September 2002, Vieira was sent off for a late tackle on Gianfranco Zola; Arsenal's persistence nevertheless earnt them a point. In an interview with L'Équipe soon after, Vieira spoke of his desire to rest, as he felt "burned out": "I can hardly stand. My back aches, my legs hurt, it hurts all over. I'm going to see Arsène. He must give me time off to relax." He featured in 66 games the previous campaign for Arsenal, but Wenger rejected the player's need for special treatment: "I looked at the statistics for Tuesday's game and, physically, Patrick was outstanding. He pushed himself very hard and that explains why he was so tired."

Vieira's performance against Charlton on 14 September 2002 – incidentally his 200th league appearance for Arsenal – "justified Wenger's faith in his captain's fitness". Two months later, he was lauded by The Guardian correspondent David Lacey for his show against Newcastle United: "the Arsenal captain dominated the afternoon with a demonstration of tackling, control, awareness and movement that was exceptional even by his standards." Vieira sustained a groin injury against Valencia in December 2002, returning on Boxing Day to face West Bromwich Albion. In May 2003, Vieira was fined £2,300 by UEFA, having criticised the organisation for not doing enough on racism, as Vieira had been subjected to racist abuse against Valencia. Vieira missed Arsenal's title run-in, which saw Manchester United overtake them in first place, due to sustaining a knee injury. Vieira was also ruled out of the 2003 FA Cup Final, which Arsenal won.

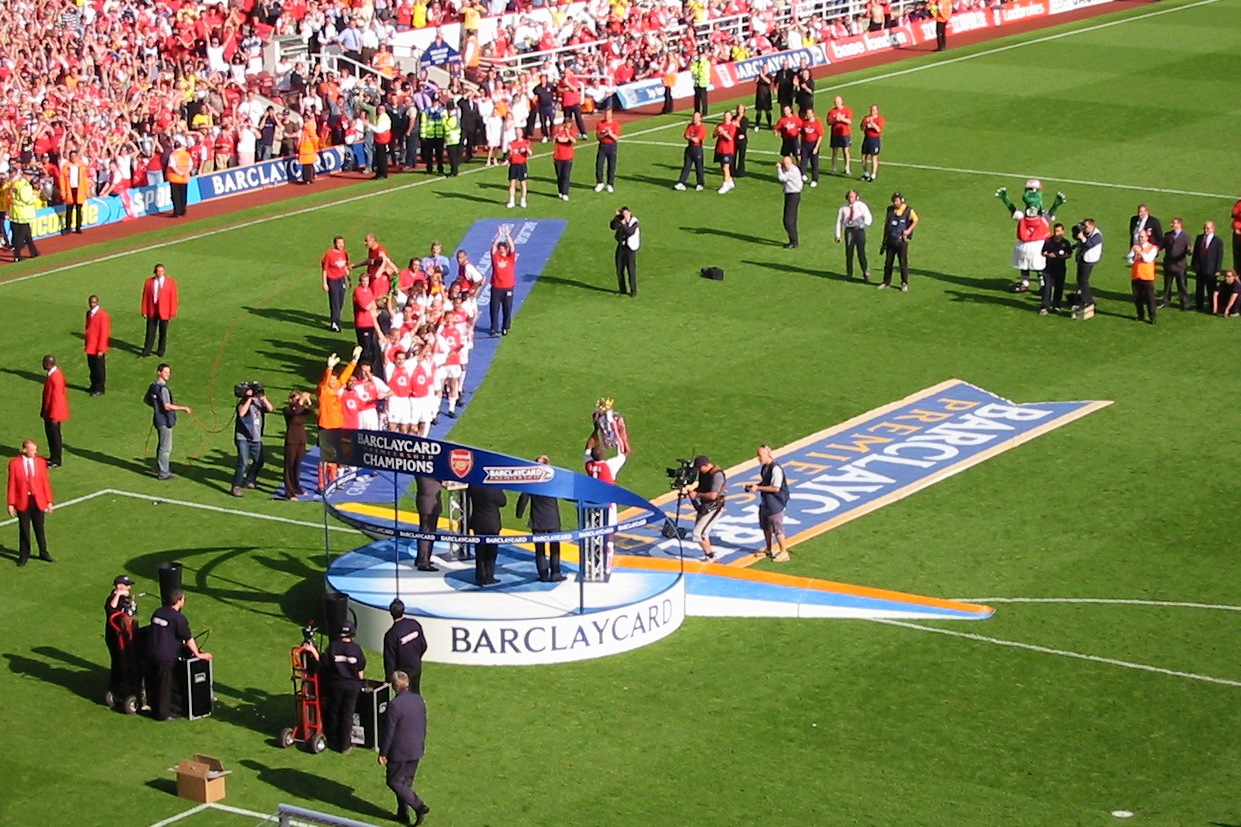
Vieira (centre, on podium) lifting the Premier League trophy in May 2004.

In spite of growing interest to sign Vieira, not least from Manchester United, Real Madrid and Chelsea in summer 2003, he agreed to stay at Arsenal and signed a deal that ran until 2007. The 2003–04 season was a successful one for Arsenal, as they reclaimed the league title and became the first English team in more than a century to go through the entire league season unbeaten. Vieira endured a troubling start to the campaign, as he was sent off against Manchester United in September 2003, banned for one match, and later fined £20,000 "for improper conduct in failing to leave the field of play following his sending-off". He went off with a thigh strain during the match against Newcastle United, which commenced a period of being in and out of the side for two months. He scored his first goal of the season against Chelsea on 21 February 2004; Arsenal afterwards opened up a seven-point gap at the top of the league. Two months later, Vieira scored the opening goal away to Tottenham Hotspur, in what ended a 2–2 draw – enough for Arsenal to regain the title. Against Leicester City in the final league match of the campaign, with the score tied at 1–1, Dennis Bergkamp set up Vieira with a pass, to which he rounded the goalkeeper and scored. Arsenal ended the campaign as league champions without a single defeat – a record of 26 wins and twelve draws.

==== Final season (2004–05) ====
The re-election of Real Madrid president Florentino Pérez in July 2004 prompted him to declare the club's ambition to sign Vieira: "I must repeat that my policy is to try to sign the best player in the world in every position where we do not already have that. Patrick Vieira is, in my opinion, the best in the world in his position." Vieira's advisors met with officials from Real Madrid, before it was speculated a bid of £18 million had been put on the table. Following an ultimatum set by Wenger, who was "likely" to make an offer for West Ham midfielder Michael Carrick as his replacement, Vieira chose to stay at Arsenal. In a statement, he said: "I'm staying at the club. I'm proud to be captain of the club and I'm looking forward to achieving my ambitions."

Vieira scored his first goal of the 2004–05 season in a nine-goal North London derby, which Arsenal won 5–4 on 13 November 2004. His second goal came in a fortnight at Liverpool, "lift[ing] a lazy, delicate finish away from Chris Kirkland" after a one-touch move. Arsenal lost the match late on and Vieira, booked in the match, was suspended for the December clash against league leaders Chelsea; he scored the only goal for the team against Newcastle in the Christmas period. Vieira was involved in a tunnel bust up with Manchester United captain Roy Keane in February 2005 and was confronted about an incident involving Gary Neville. Arsenal fell to third as a result of losing 4–2 to United, but a twelve-game unbeaten run, culminating in a 7–0 home win against Everton, meant they ended the season in second place. In the 2005 FA Cup Final, he scored the winning penalty in a penalty shoot-out after a 0–0 draw with Manchester United, which proved to be his final kick of a ball for Arsenal. Vieira returned for the opening match of Emirates Stadium, in a testimonial for Bergkamp on 22 July 2006, as one of the Arsenal legends against Ajax.

=== Juventus ===
In July 2005, representatives of Juventus met with Arsenal with a view to signing Vieira. The player, according to The Guardian, accepted that Arsenal were "ready to let him go", before agreeing in principle to join Juventus. On 15 August, he signed a five-year contract, in a deal worth £13.75 million. Vieira was reunited with Fabio Capello, who had signed him for Milan as a teenager. Capello described him as a "very important player", adding that "his presence is felt not only for his technical value but for his physical quality." Capello deployed Vieira in a midfield alongside Emerson and Pavel Nedvěd. Vieira made his debut for Juventus in their 1–0 win against Chievo on 28 August 2005. On 14 September, he was sent off against Club Brugge, in Juventus' first match of the Champions League.

Vieira scored his first goal for the club – a 37th-minute winner against Udinese a week after – which contributed towards Juventus' impressive start to the season. Having picked up a groin injury through international duty for France, Vieira missed Juventus' Champions League match away to Bayern Munich in October 2005. Despite his performances dipping as the result of a persistent groin injury, and a reported training ground bust-up with teammate Zlatan Ibrahimović, Vieira helped Juventus retain the Scudetto, which was later stripped. Vieira returned to Highbury on 28 March 2006 to play against Arsenal in the first leg of the quarter-finals of the Champions League. During that game, he was the subject of a strong tackle by former club and national teammate Robert Pires. Vieira was left crestfallen as Pires regained possession and Arsenal attacked, scoring the first goal of the tie through Cesc Fàbregas. Pires humorously quipped that it was the first time in 13 years he had got the better of Vieira physically. Vieira also received a yellow card during that leg, which Arsenal won 2–0, and was suspended for the return leg on 5 April, which ended 0–0 and eliminated Juventus.

=== Inter Milan ===
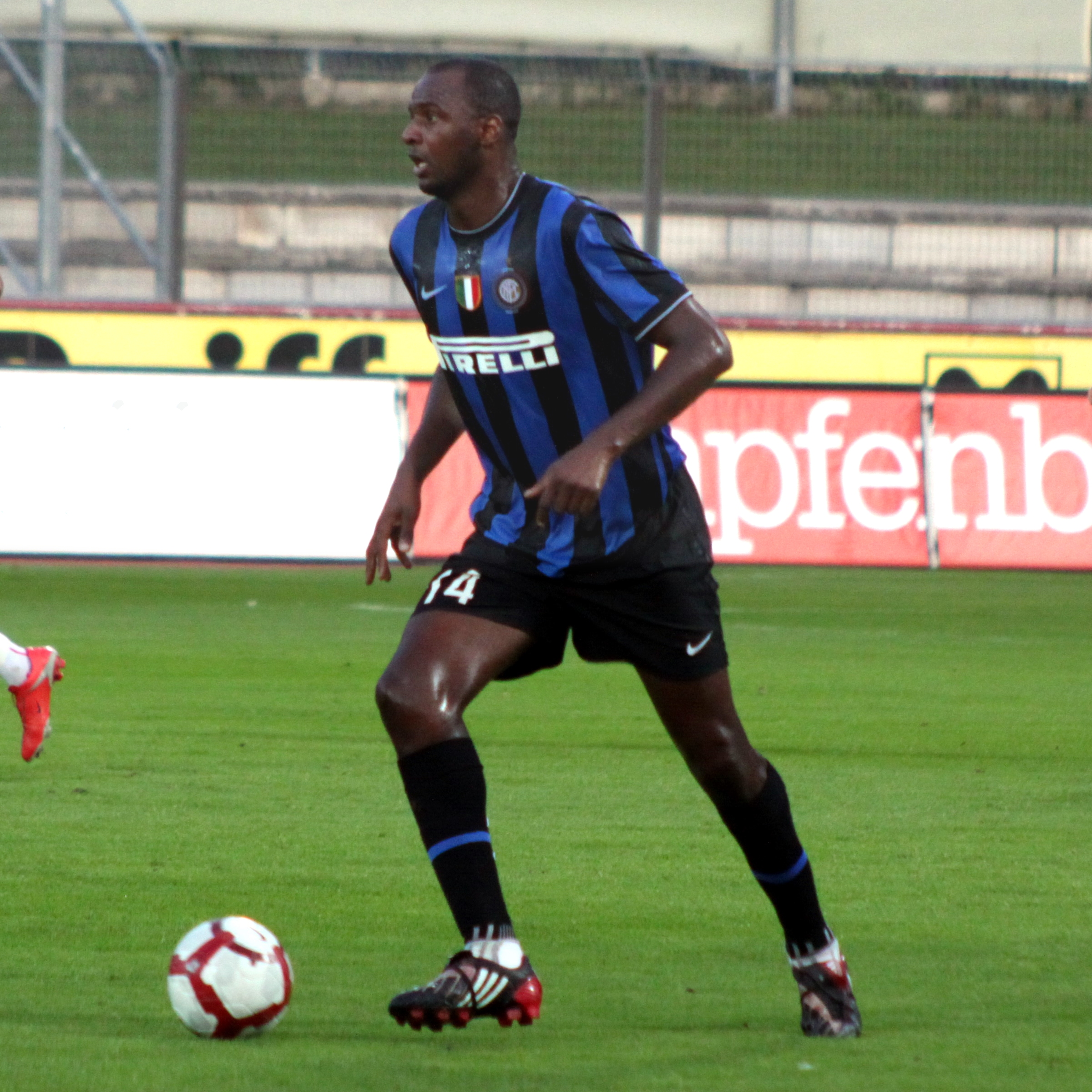
Vieira playing with Inter in August 2009

Juventus were stripped of their 2004–05 and 2005–06 titles, after it was revealed they were involved in the Calciopoli scandal. Juventus were relegated to Serie B and deducted 17 points by the Italian Football Federation (FIGC) for their involvement, prompting many of the club's major stars to move elsewhere. After press speculation linking him to various clubs, including a move back to Arsenal, on 2 August 2006, Vieira officially signed a four-year deal with Inter Milan, in a deal to be worth €9.5 million, less than half of the €20 million fee Juventus had paid just twelve months prior. Vieira declared he wanted to continue to play at the highest level at the presentation conference, which is his reason to leave Juventus.

On his Inter debut on 26 August, Vieira scored twice as the team won 4–3 against Roma in the Supercoppa Italiana at the San Siro. He later won the 2006–07, 2007–08 and 2008–09 Serie A titles; due to injury, he failed to become a regular starter. Olivier Dacourt, initially a backup player, became manager Roberto Mancini's first choice player in the 2006–07 season. After the club signed Sulley Muntari and Thiago Motta, Vieira became of lesser and lesser importance to the team. In response to extensive media speculation regarding a possible return by Vieira to his former club in 2009, Arsenal manager Arsène Wenger admitted that he would contemplate re-signing Vieira. The move never happened, and Vieira remained at Inter. On 6 January 2010, Vieira was unusually included in the starting lineup against Chievo, which was his eighth league start of the season. Before the match commenced, Inter had lost Esteban Cambiasso and Muntari due to injury, with Dejan Stanković and Motta suspended. José Mourinho stated that Vieira had played his last game at Inter after the match.

=== Manchester City ===
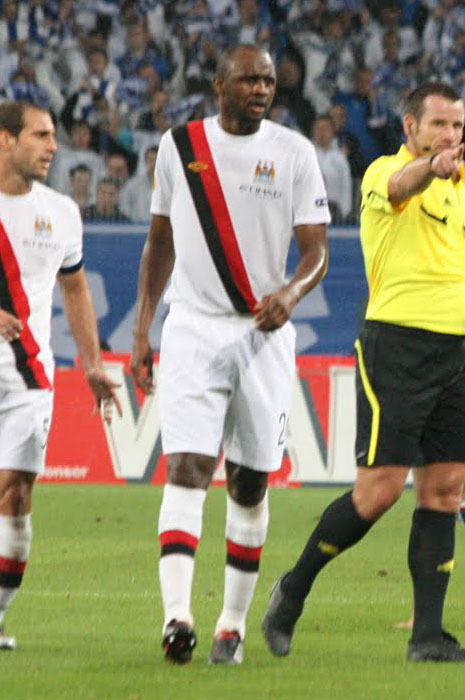
Vieira with Manchester City in November 2010

On 8 January 2010, it was confirmed that Vieira was having a medical at Manchester City, and he would sign a six-month deal, where he would link up with former Arsenal colleagues Kolo Touré and Sylvinho, as well as former Inter manager Roberto Mancini. The contract also included an option for a twelve-month extension. Mancini described Vieira as an excellent midfielder with a winner's mentality, and that he would fit into Manchester City's squad very well. He made his debut on 6 February in the 2–1 defeat away to Hull City, replacing Craig Bellamy after an hour. Three days later, he made his first start against Bolton Wanderers, where he assisted Emmanuel Adebayor through a long ball in the 2–0 victory. Later in the month, he was given a three-match retrospective ban for a kick at Stoke City's Glenn Whelan. He scored his first goal for the club against Burnley in a 6–1 win on 3 April 2010.

On 9 June, Vieira agreed to a one-year extension to his contract, which kept him at Eastlands until the summer of 2011. On 22 February 2011, Vieira scored the first two City goals in a 5–0 win in the FA Cup Fourth round replay against Notts County, and was awarded Man of the Match honours. He scored in the Premier League on 3 April against Sunderland, a minute after having come on as a substitute for Adam Johnson in the 5–0 win. He made an added-time substitute appearance in place of David Silva on 14 May, as Manchester City won the 2011 FA Cup Final with a 1–0 win over Stoke at Wembley. On 14 July, he retired at the age of 35, immediately becoming a development executive at City.

== International career ==
Vieira made his debut for France in 1997 against the Netherlands. Altogether, he won 107 caps for France, scoring six goals. He was part of the France squad in the 1998 FIFA World Cup. He came on as a substitute in the final against Brazil, and set up Arsenal teammate Emmanuel Petit for France's third goal in a 3–0 win. He, with the rest of the squad, was appointed a Knight of the Legion of Honour in 1998.

He subsequently played as a first choice midfield player in France's successful campaign at UEFA Euro 2000, which they won, beating Italy in the final. He helped France to victory in the 2001 FIFA Confederations Cup, ending the tournament as joint top scorer with two goals, including the winner, a header, in the final against Japan. He also played in all three games in the 2002 World Cup, in which France were eliminated in the group stage, failing to score a goal. Vieira was injured and missed France's defeat to Greece, the eventual winners, at Euro 2004. After the tournament in Portugal, he became captain upon Zinedine Zidane's retirement from international football. In August 2005, he returned the armband as Zidane returned to the team.

On 23 June 2006, his 30th birthday, Vieira took the captain's armband for the match in place of the suspended Zidane, and scored the first goal as France beat Togo 2–0 in the group stages of the 2006 World Cup; he also assisted Thierry Henry for the second. This win helped France advance to the knockout stages in second behind Switzerland. In the round of 16, Vieira assisted the equaliser by Franck Ribéry and scored the second goal in a 3–1 win over Spain. Vieira started the final, but was substituted injured for Alou Diarra as Italy won 5–3 on penalties after a 1–1 draw.

On 5 August 2006, Vieira was reappointed captain of the France national team for the Euro 2008 qualifying campaign following Zidane's full retirement. He became the fifth Frenchman to earn 100 caps on 15 November, in a 1–0 win over Greece at the Stade de France. He played no part in the group games at Euro 2008 for a struggling France due to a niggling knee injury. His last cap with the national team was on 2 June 2009 in a friendly match against Nigeria, and was not included by coach Raymond Domenech in France's squad for the 2010 World Cup in South Africa. On 7 July 2010, Vieira confirmed that he was no longer interested in playing for France and would devote his time to Manchester City.

== Style of play ==
Regarded by pundits as one of the best players ever in his position, Vieira was a complete, powerful, tenacious and aggressive footballer, with outstanding physical, athletic and technical attributes, who was also known for his grace on the pitch when in possession of the ball. Usually deployed as a defensive, central or box-to-box midfielder, he was a competent tackler and a tactically intelligent midfielder, who was known for his ability to anticipate his opponents, and was gifted with good ball skills, distribution and vision, which enabled him to start attacking plays in midfield after winning back possession; he also excelled in the air, and was known for his surging forward runs from midfield, which enabled him to contribute to his team's offensive play. These attributes, in addition to his pace, strength, pressing ability and stamina allowed him to link up the defence with the attack effectively, and made him capable of playing anywhere in midfield. In 2007, The Times placed him at number 33 in their list of the fifty hardest footballers in history. In addition to his abilities as a footballer, he also stood out for his leadership throughout his career.

== Managerial career ==
On 14 July 2011, Vieira announced his retirement from playing and accepted a training and youth development role at Premier League club Manchester City, with the title of "Football Development Executive". In this role, he forged a strong, close working relationship with City Football Group's Brian Marwood. In May 2013, Vieira was appointed as the manager of the club's new reserve team: the Elite Development Squad (EDS). In May 2015, Vieira was interviewed to be the next manager of fellow Premier League club Newcastle United, an opportunity which both parties rejected, due to difference of policies.

=== New York City FC ===
On 9 November 2015, Vieira was announced as the new head coach of New York City FC - who share owners with Manchester City, in the City Football Group - from 1 January 2016, replacing inaugural head coach Jason Kreis. He was selected for the role by Director of Football Claudio Reyna, due to his familiarity with the structure of operations within the group, as well as his tactical knowledge, which was previously utilized by Jason Kreis on his scholar period in Manchester. Vieira's first signing at the club was Jack Harrison, the first pick of the 2016 MLS SuperDraft. He took charge of his first Major League Soccer game on the road versus Chicago Fire on 6 March 2016, in which his squad claimed a 4–3 victory. He led New York City to a 7–0 home defeat to New York Red Bulls on 21 May 2016. Despite losing in the conference semi-finals to Toronto, 2016 was considered a successful first season for Vieira by nearly all pundits. New York City improved its position in the combined MLS standings in each of his years with the club, improving from 17th in 2015 to fourth in Vieira's first season in 2016, and then to second in 2017.

=== Nice ===
On 11 June 2018, Vieira was appointed as the manager of Ligue 1 side Nice. In his first season in charge, he led the club to a seventh-placed finish in the league, one place ahead of the club's position the previous season. Elsewhere in the French domestic circuit, Nice had a disappointing run in the Coupe de France, being eliminated by Toulouse in the round of 64, whereas they were defeated by Guingamp in the round of 16 during their Coupe de la Ligue campaign. On 4 December 2020, Nice announced that Vieira was no longer the manager of the club, after a run of five losses in a row in all competitions, and elimination from the group stage of the Europa League.

=== Crystal Palace ===
On 4 July 2021, Vieira was appointed as manager of Premier League club Crystal Palace on a three-year contract, following the departure of their previous manager, Roy Hodgson, who had served the club since 2017. He lost 3–0 away to Chelsea on his debut on 14 August. His first signing for the club was Michael Olise, aged 19, from Reading. In his first season, Vieira was undefeated against to his two former Premier League teams, managing a 2–2 away draw and 3–0 home win against Arsenal, and a 2–0 away win and 0–0 home draw against Manchester City. He guided the team to a twelfth-place league finish in the 2021–22 Premier League, and reached the semi-finals of the FA Cup, losing to Chelsea.

Vieira was involved in an altercation with pitch-invading Everton fans on 19 May 2022 at Goodison Park. Vieira refused to comment on the event, while opposing manager Frank Lampard sympathised with him. Neither Vieira or the fan agreed to file a complaint or support prosecution of the other when they were questioned by Merseyside Police. Vieira was sacked by the club on 17 March 2023, after a twelve-game run without a win, including a three-game span without a single shot on target, left the team three points above the relegation zone. His last match in charge was a 1–0 away defeat to rivals Brighton & Hove Albion on 15 March. He was replaced by his predecessor Hodgson.

=== Strasbourg ===
On 2 July 2023, Vieira signed a three-year deal at Ligue 1 club Strasbourg, shortly after their takeover by Chelsea owners BlueCo. His debut on 13 August was a 2–1 home win over Lyon. From 24 September to 7 December, the team went on an eight-game winless run, which fans blamed on a summer transfer window in which four 20-year-olds were signed for a combined fee of €53 million but struggled to perform. His team reached the quarter-finals of the Coupe de France, losing on penalties to Lyon after a goalless draw at the Parc Olympique Lyonnais. Vieira's young team struggled on the pitch as fans expressed hostility to the American owners and their business plan of developing new players for Chelsea. On 18 July 2024, Vieira left the club by mutual agreement.

=== Genoa ===
On 20 November 2024, Vieira was announced as the new head coach of Genoa, following the dismissal of their previous manager Alberto Gilardino. Genoa was 17th in the table when Vieira took over, and only one point out of the relegation zone, but they ended the season finishing safely in 13th place. Despite being linked with managerial moves to Roma and Inter Milan, on 9 June 2025 Vieira signed a contract extension with Genoa until June 2027. On 1 November 2025, Vieira left his role as Genoa head coach by mutual consent, with the team bottom of Serie A.

=== Senegal ===
On 18 August 2026, Viera was appointed as the new head coach of Senegal national team on a four-year contract, following the sacking of Pape Thiaw.

== Style of management ==
Vieira has been known for implementing a methodical, possession-based football in all his teams. He has shown a tendency to become more defensive when his side are in a tight spot. His spell at Crystal Palace saw a shift to a proactive style of gameplay from the reactive counterattack-based gameplay prominent under the management of Roy Hodgson.

== Personal life ==
Vieira and his Trinidadian wife, Cheryl, first met in England while he was playing for Arsenal. They have a daughter. The family experienced a home invasion in May 2006, when gas was pumped into their home near Cannes, but suffered no long-term effects. In 2003, Vieira returned to Senegal for the first time since his childhood, to lay the foundation stone of the Diambars football academy in Saly. The academy produced nine of the players in Senegal's squad at the 2012 Olympic football tournament.

== Media ==
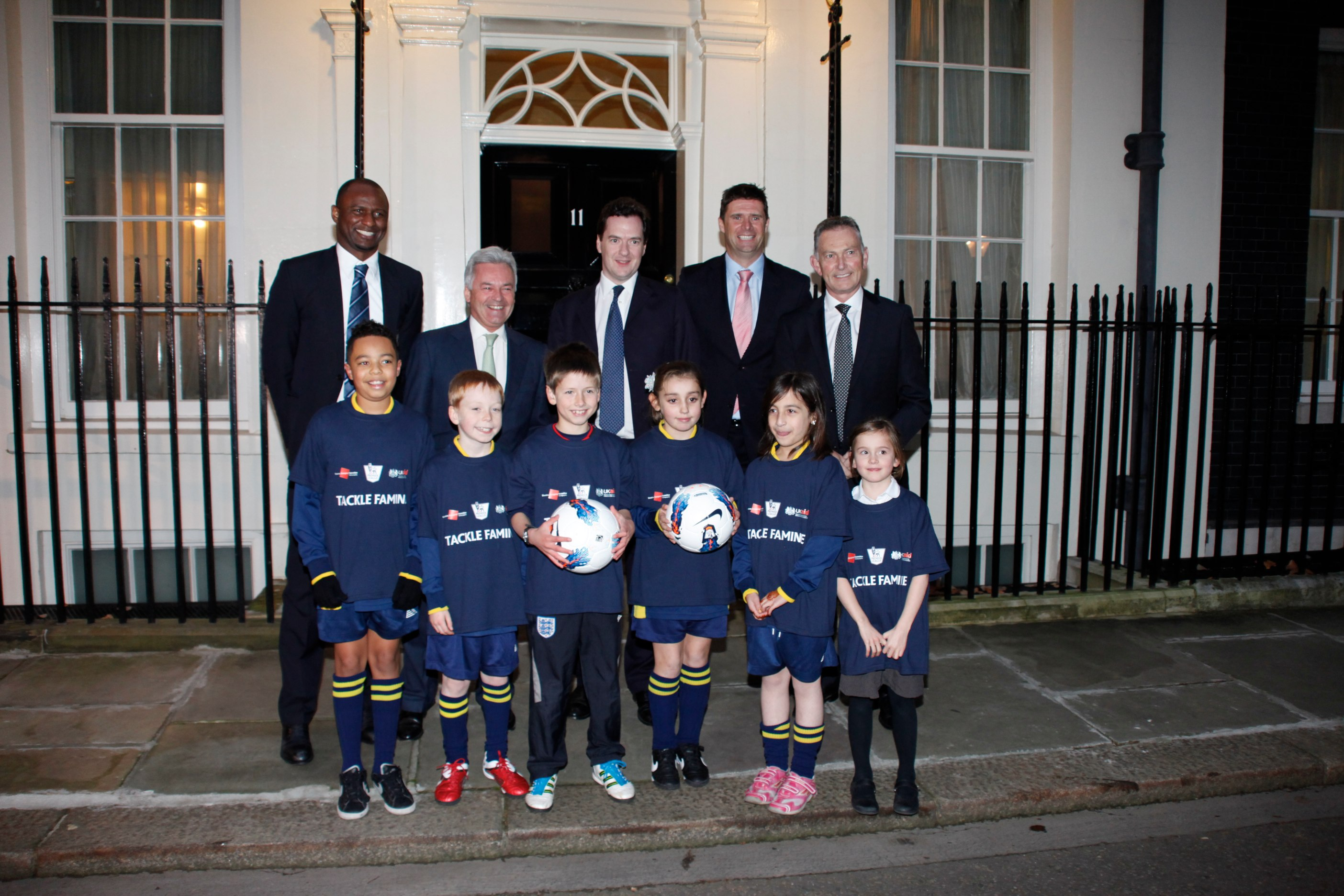
Vieira (rear left) with Chancellor George Osborne at a fundraiser for famine in East Africa in 2011

Vieira features in the FIFA video game series published by EA Sports; he was on the cover of FIFA 2005, and was named in the Ultimate Team Legends in FIFA 14. Vieira was sponsored by sportswear company Nike, and appeared in several Nike commercials. In a global Nike advertising campaign in the run-up to the 2002 World Cup in Korea and Japan, he starred in a "Secret Tournament" commercial (branded "Scorpion KO") directed by Terry Gilliam, appearing alongside football players such as Thierry Henry, Ronaldo, Edgar Davids, Fabio Cannavaro, Francesco Totti, Ronaldinho, Luís Figo and Hidetoshi Nakata, with former player Eric Cantona the tournament "referee". Vieira also worked as a pundit for ITV during their coverage of the 2014 FIFA World Cup.

== Career statistics ==
=== Club ===
Appearances and goals by club, season and competition
Club	Season	League			National Cup		League Cup		Continental		Total	
Club	Season	Division	Apps	Goals	Apps	Goals	Apps	Goals	Apps	Goals	Apps	Goals
Cannes	1993–94	Division 1	5	0	1	0	–		–		6	0
Cannes	1994–95	Division 1	31	2	2	1	1	0	4	1	38	4
Cannes	1995–96	Division 1	13	0	0	0	0	0	4	0	17	0
Cannes	Total		49	2	3	1	1	0	8	1	61	4
AC Milan	1995–96	Serie A	2	0	1	0	–		2	0	5	0
Arsenal	1996–97	Premier League	31	2	3	0	3	0	1	0	38	2
Arsenal	1997–98	Premier League	33	2	9	0	2	0	2	0	46	2
Arsenal	1998–99	Premier League	34	3	4	1	1	0	3	0	42	4
Arsenal	1999–2000	Premier League	30	2	2	0	1	0	14	0	47	2
Arsenal	2000–01	Premier League	30	5	6	1	0	0	12	0	48	6
Arsenal	2001–02	Premier League	36	2	7	0	0	0	11	1	54	3
Arsenal	2002–03	Premier League	24	3	5	0	1	0	12	1	42	4
Arsenal	2003–04	Premier League	29	3	5	0	3	0	7	0	44	3
Arsenal	2004–05	Premier League	32	6	6	1	0	0	6	0	44	7
Arsenal	Total		279	28	48	3	11	0	68	2	406	33
Juventus	2005–06	Serie A	31	5	3	0	1	0	7	0	42	5
Inter Milan	2006–07	Serie A	20	1	3	0	1	2	4	1	28	4
Inter Milan	2007–08	Serie A	16	3	3	0	1	0	3	0	23	3
Inter Milan	2008–09	Serie A	19	1	2	0	–		3	0	24	1
Inter Milan	2009–10	Serie A	12	1	1	0	1	0	2	0	16	1
Inter Milan	Total		67	6	9	0	3	2	12	1	91	9
Manchester City	2009–10	Premier League	13	1	1	0	0	0	–		14	1
Manchester City	2010–11	Premier League	15	2	8	3	1	0	8	0	32	5
Manchester City	Total		28	3	9	3	1	0	8	0	46	6
Career total			456	44	73	7	17	2	105	4	650	57

- In League Cup, including Charity Shield and Supercoppa Italiana

=== International ===
Appearances and goals by national team and year
National team	Year	Apps	Goals
France	1997	5	0
France	1998	5	0
France	1999	8	0
France	2000	17	0
France	2001	13	2
France	2002	12	2
France	2003	5	0
France	2004	11	0
France	2005	7	0
France	2006	17	2
France	2007	4	0
France	2008	2	0
France	2009	1	0
Total		107	6

Scores and results list France's goal tally first, score column indicates score after each Vieira goal

List of international goals scored by Patrick Vieira
No.	Date	Venue	Opponent	Score	Result	Competition
1	30 May 2001	Daegu World Cup Stadium, Daegu, South Korea	South Korea	2–0	5–0	2001 FIFA Confederations Cup
2	10 June 2001	Yokohama International Stadium, Yokohama, Japan	Japan	1–0	1–0	2001 FIFA Confederations Cup
3	13 February 2002	Stade de France, Saint-Denis, France	Romania	1–0	2–1	Friendly
4	12 October 2002	Stade de France, Saint-Denis, France	Slovenia	1–0	5–0	UEFA Euro 2004 qualifying
5	23 June 2006	RheinEnergieStadion, Cologne, Germany	Togo	1–0	2–0	2006 FIFA World Cup
6	27 June 2006	AWD-Arena, Hanover, Germany	Spain	2–1	3–1	2006 FIFA World Cup

=== Managerial ===
As of match played 16 November 2026

Team	Nat.	From	To	Record								Ref.
Team	Nat.	From	To	M	W	D	L	GF	GA	GD	Win %	Ref.
New York City FC	(United States)	1 January 2016	11 June 2018	90	40	22	28	151	137	+14	44.44	
Nice	(France)	11 June 2018	4 December 2020	89	35	22	32	106	115	−9	39.33	
Crystal Palace	(England)	4 July 2021	17 March 2023	74	22	25	27	84	87	−3	29.73	
Strasbourg	(France)	2 July 2023	18 July 2024	39	14	10	15	48	52	−4	35.90	
Genoa	(Italy)	20 November 2024	1 November 2025	37	10	12	15	38	41	−3	27.03	
Senegal	(Senegal)	18 August 2026	present	5	4	1	0	11	4	+7	80.00	
Total				334	125	92	117	438	436	+2	37.43	

== Honours ==
=== Player ===
AC Milan

- Serie A: 1995–96

Arsenal

- Premier League: 1997–98, 2001–02, 2003–04
- FA Cup: 1997–98, 2001–02, 2002–03, 2004–05; runner-up: 2000–01
- FA Community Shield: 1998, 1999, 2002
- UEFA Cup runner-up: 1999–2000

Juventus

- Serie A: 2005–06 (Revoked)

Inter Milan

- Serie A: 2006–07, 2007–08, 2008–09, 2009–10
- Coppa Italia: 2009–10; runner-up: 2006–07, 2007–08
- Supercoppa Italiana: 2006
- UEFA Champions League: 2009–10

Manchester City

- FA Cup: 2010–11

France

- FIFA World Cup: 1998
- UEFA European Championship: 2000
- FIFA Confederations Cup: 2001

Individual

- Division 1 Rookie of the Year: 1995
- Ballon d'Or nominee: 2000, 2001, 2002, 2003, 2004, 2005, 2006
- UEFA European Championship Team of the Tournament: 2000
- FIFA Confederations Cup Silver Ball: 2001
- FIFA World Cup All-star team: 2006
- PFA Team of the Year: 1998–99 Premier League, 1999–2000 Premier League, 2000–01 Premier League, 2001–02 Premier League, 2002–03 Premier League, 2003–04 Premier League
- Premier League Player of the Season: 2000–01
- UEFA Team of the Year: 2001
- France Football French Player of the Year: 2001
- Premier League Hall of Fame: 2022
- Premier League Overseas Team of the Decade: 1992–93 – 2001–02
- Premier League Overall Team of the Decade: 1992–93 – 2001–02
- Arsenal Player of the Season: 2000−01
- FIFA 100: 2004
- Sports Illustrated Team of the Decade: 2009
- UNFP 20 Year Special Team Trophy: 2011
- English Football Hall of Fame: 2014
- Golden Foot Legends Award: 2019

=== Manager ===
Manchester City EDS

- Premier League International Cup: 2014–15

=== Orders ===
- Knight of the Legion of Honour: 1998

== See also ==
- List of men's footballers with 100 or more international caps
