= José María =

- Gender: Male

Other names
- Nicknames: Chema, Txema
- Related names: Joseph, Maria

José María (abbreviated José Mª) is a Spanish language male given name, usually considered a single given name rather than two names, and is a combination of the Spanish names of Joseph and Mary, the parents of Jesus Christ. The separate names "José" for males and "María" for females also exist in the Spanish language. They can also combine in the inverse order forming the female name "María José" (Mª José); that is, the gender of the compound names "José María" and "María José" is determined by their first component. The name "José María" is colloquially shortened to "José Mari", "Josema" or replaced by the hypocoristic forms "Chema", "Chemari" or "Chemis".

There are also combinations of other male given names with María, for example Carlos María, Juan María and Luis María.

"José María", with its Portuguese language equivalent José Maria (notice the absence of the acute accent over the i in the Portuguese version) is a common name, and many famous people have the name or a similar one.

== Spanish names ==
- José María Agüero (1947–2023), Costa Rican footballer
- José María de Achá (1810–1868), 14th President of Bolivia from 1861 to 1864
- Jose Maria Ambrosio Ezpeleta (born 1970), Philippine Navy vice admiral
- José María Amorrortu (born 1953), Spanish former footballer and manager
- José María Aznar (born 1953), President of the Government of Spain from 1996 to 2004
- José María Barreda (born 1953), President of the Spanish autonomous region of Castile-La Mancha
- José María Callejón (born 1987), Spanish former professional footballer
- Jose Mari Chan (born 1945), Filipino-Chinese singer, songwriter, TV personality, and businessman in the sugar industry
- José María Dols Abellán (the elder; 1953–2014), Spanish bullfighter
- Jose Maria Diaz Sanjurjo (1818–1857), Spanish Thomasian Martyr
- José María Dols Samper (the younger; born 1982), Spanish bullfighter and model
- Josemaría Escrivá (1902–1975), Spanish Catholic priest – founder of Opus Dei
- Jose Maria Flores Lacaba, real name of Pete Lacaba (born 1945), Filipino screenwriter, editor, poet, journalist, activist, and translator
- José María Franco (born 1978), Uruguayan former footballer
- José María García Lafuente, commonly known as "José Mari" (born 1971), Spanish footballer
- Jose Mari Gonzales (1938–2019), Filipino actor, executive, matinee idol, and politician
- José María Gutiérrez, commonly known as "Guti" (born 1976), Spanish footballer
- José María Hernández (1959–2015), Spanish politician
- Jose Maria de Leon Jr., commonly known as "Joey de Leon" (born 1946), Filipino comedian, actor, television host, and songwriter
- José María Linares (1808–1861), President of Bolivia from 1857 to 1861
- José María Martín Bejarano-Serrano, commonly known as "José Mari" (born 1987), Spanish retired professional footballer
- José María Morelos (1765–1815), Mexican Roman Catholic priest, statesman, and military leader
- José María Napoleón (born 1948), Mexican singer and composer
- José María Olazábal (born 1966), Spanish professional golfer
- José María Romero Poyón, commonly known as "José Mari" (born 1978), Spanish former footballer
- José María Ruiz Mateos (1931–2015), Spanish businessman and politician
- Jose Maria Sison (1939–2022), Filipino activist, professor, writer, poet, political thinker, founder of the Communist Party of the Philippines, and adherent of Maoism
- José María de Torrijos y Uriarte (1791–1831), Spanish general
- José María Zárraga (1930–2012), Spanish professional footballer
- José María Jesús Carbajal (1809–1874), Mexican revolutionary and freedom fighter
- José María Balcázar (1943–), 66th President of Peru in 2026

== Portuguese names ==
- Miguel Boaventura Lucena, known as "José Maria de Santo Agostinho", or simply "José Maria" (?–1912), Brazilian religious leader
- José Maria Marin (born 1932), Brazilian politician and former sports administrator
- José Maria Neves (born 1960), 5th president of Cabo Verde
- José Maria Rodrigues Alves, nicknamed "Zé Maria" (born 1949), Brazilian former association footballer

== See also ==
- José Maria
- Zé Maria
