= Khalid El Bakraoui =

Belgian-Moroccan terrorist (1989–2016)

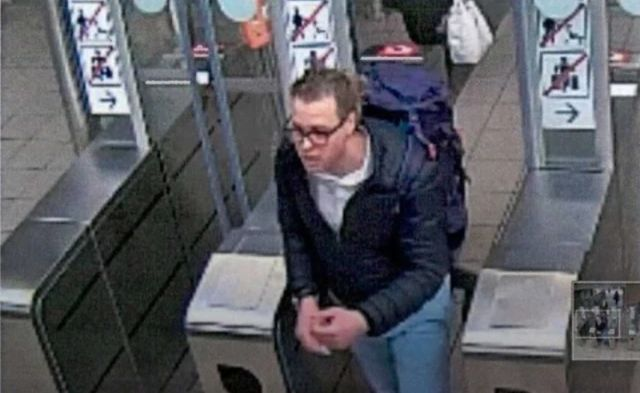
- A CCTV still of El Bakraoui shortly before the Maelbeek metro station bombing
- Born: 12 January 1989; Brussels, Belgium
- Status: Deceased
- Died: 22 March 2016 (aged 27); Brussels, Belgium
- Known for: Involvement in the 2016 Brussels bombings

Khālid El Bakraoui (Arabic: خالد البكراوي; 12 January 1989 – 22 March 2016), also known as Abū Walīd al-Baljīkī, was a Belgian terrorist of Moroccan descent, confirmed to be the suicide bomber at the metro station in the 2016 Brussels bombings.

== Early life ==
El Bakraoui was raised in Laken, a residential district in northwestern Brussels. His father, a retired butcher and devout Muslim, emigrated from Morocco; his mother was described as "conservative and reclusive". His brother Ibrahim has been identified as one of two suicide bombers at Brussels Airport.

== Criminal history ==
=== Arrests ===
On 27 October 2009, he was one of three men involved in a bank robbery, in which they kidnapped an employee and forced her to drive them to her workplace in Brussels and deactivate the alarm. They made off with €41,000. About two weeks later, Khalid stole a vehicle and was later found with it and a number of other stolen vehicles in a warehouse. Though he was detained, he was not charged at the time.

In 2011, El Bakraoui was arrested for the possession of Kalashnikov rifles. In September 2011, he was convicted of the carjackings, possession of weapons, and the 2009 bank robbery, being sentenced to five years in prison. He was released from prison after serving most of his sentence.

In May 2015, following his release, El Bakraoui was arrested upon meeting with a former criminal accomplice, which violated a term of his parole, but a judge released him because he continued to meet the rest of his parole conditions. From October 2015, he failed his parole appointments and abandoned his address, resulting in a cancelled parole as of February 2016.

=== International warrant of arrest and terrorist activities ===
In August 2015, Interpol issued a warrant for his arrest. Two further arrest warrants were issued for El Bakraoui on 11 December 2015, one international and one European. Both were issued by a Paris judge investigating the November 2015 Paris attacks, because El Bakraoui, using false documents, rented the Charleroi house where fingerprints of Abdelhamid Abaaoud, the mastermind of those attacks, as well as an involved suicide bomber, Bilal Hadfi, were found.

According to a report by the De Morgen daily, Belgian authorities, acting after they learned, in the summer of 2015, of his call on friends to help him obtain as many Kalashnikov chargers as possible, searched El Bakraoui's home in October 2015, found evidence of "calls to jihad" and "images of known terrorists", but found no weapons and therefore did not make an arrest.

On 15 March 2016, El Bakraoui and his brother Ibrahim El Bakraoui evaded capture during a police raid in Brussels. On 16 March 2016, the Federal Bureau of Investigation (FBI) in the United States sent information about them to authorities in the Netherlands. The New York Police Department's Intelligence Division also informed the Dutch embassy liaison in Washington, that they were wanted for "terrorism, extremism and recruitment".

== Death ==
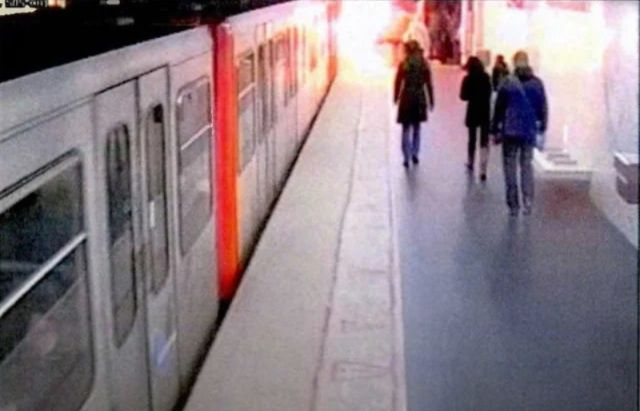
A CCTV still of the bombing

Khalid El Bakraoui has been identified as the suicide bomber at Maalbeek metro station in Brussels on 22 March 2016.

== See also ==
- Brussels ISIL terror cell
