= Olivier Dacourt =

French footballer (born 1974)

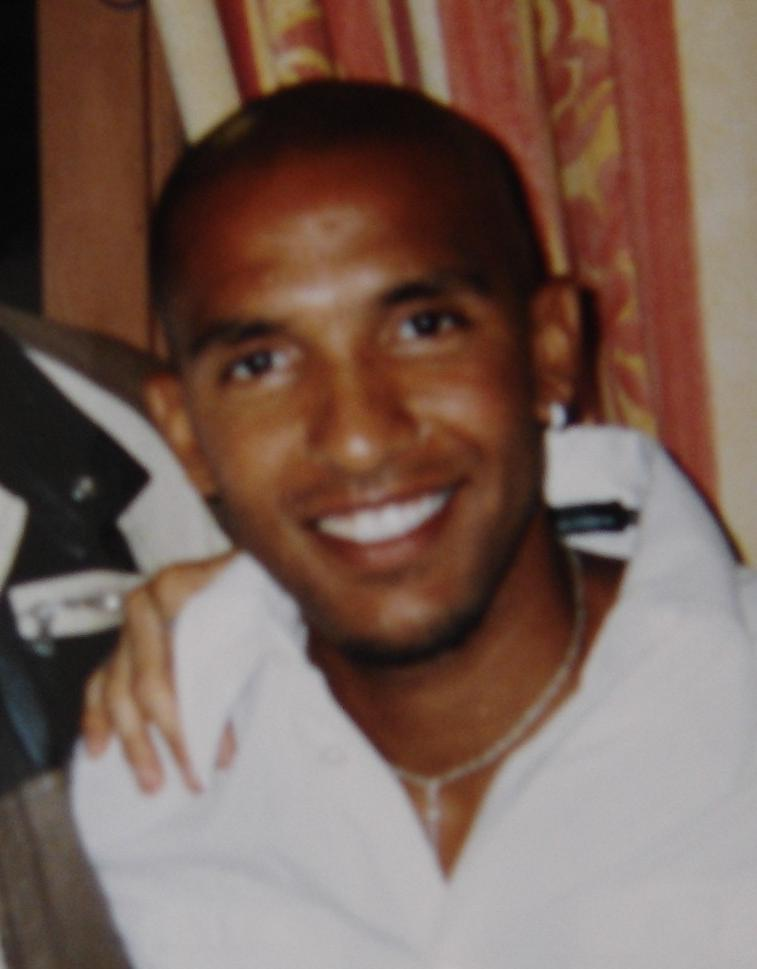
- Dacourt in 2005

Personal information
- Full name: Olivier Yohan Dacourt
- Date of birth: 25 September 1974 (age 52)
- Place of birth: Montreuil, Seine-Saint-Denis, France
- Height: 1.78 m (5 ft 10 in)
- Position: Midfielder

Youth career
- 1989–1991: Aulnay-sous-Bois
- 1991–1992: Strasbourg

Senior career*
Years	Team	Apps	(Gls)
1992–1998	Strasbourg	127	(4)
1998–1999	Everton	30	(2)
1999–2000	Lens	26	(2)
2000–2003	Leeds United	57	(3)
2003	→ Roma (loan)	18	(0)
2003–2006	Roma	76	(2)
2006–2009	Inter Milan	34	(0)
2009	→ Fulham (loan)	9	(0)
2009–2010	Standard Liège	8	(0)
Total		385	(12)

International career
2001–2004	France	21	(1)
- * Club domestic league appearances and goals

Olivier Yohan Dacourt (born 25 September 1974) is a French former professional footballer who played as a midfielder.

== Club career ==
=== Early career ===
Dacourt was born in Montreuil, Seine-Saint-Denis. He made his debut in Division 1 with Strasbourg on 20 March 1993 in an away game with Auxerre, which Strasbourg lost 2–0. On 24 May 1997, he scored his first Ligue 1 goal for Strasbourg in an away match against Paris Saint-Germain, however, Strasbourg lost the match 2–1.

Dacourt transferred to Everton in 1998 and his debut game in the Premier League was a 0–0 draw against Aston Villa on 15 August 1998. On 23 September 1998, he scored his first goal in a League Cup tie against Huddersfield Town. Dacourt became a fan favourite with the Everton supporters, but was booed at the club's final home game of the season in May 1999 against West Ham after comments in a French article that he was unhappy at the club and looking to leave in the summer.

Dacourt returned to France after one season at Everton to play for Lens, where he impressed and earned a multimillion-pound move back to the Premier League, joining the Yorkshire club Leeds United.

=== Leeds United ===
Dacourt joined Leeds United from Lens in a £7.2 million move in 2000, and broke Leeds' transfer record at the time. He proved to be an instant hero at Elland Road with his tenacious style and ball winning play. His time at Leeds saw them reach the Champions League semi finals and also finishing in the top 4 of the Premier League. He was a regular in centre midfield under manager David O'Leary, mainly partnering David Batty in Leeds' midfield. His form at Leeds also saw Dacourt become a regular for the French national side. But after the sacking of O'Leary, his replacement Terry Venables dropped Dacourt from the Leeds team and favoured players like Paul Okon ahead of him.

Venables had a public falling out with Dacourt, in which Venables claimed he 'would personally drive Dacourt' away from the club. With Leeds' financial problems Dacourt was loaned out to Roma, and during his time out on loan Venables was sacked and replaced by Peter Reid with many believing Dacourt would return, but during the summer his loan move to Roma was made permanent. Dacourt proclaimed that he would like to return to Leeds one day in the future after playing in his former teammate Lucas Radebe's testimonial.

=== Roma and Inter Milan ===
Dacourt joined Roma on loan, with an option to purchase for £4 million. He signed a contract worth €1.85 million in gross. On 10 July 2003, Roma agreed to sign Dacourt outright for a new price: €5 million. Dacourt signed a 3-year contract, worth €4 million in gross each season. After being on the losing side in the Coppa Italia final against Inter Milan in 2005–06, Dacourt joined the club from Roma on a two-year contract in accordance with the Bosman ruling.

Originally signed as a backup player for Inter Milan, he became a key player of the league victory, in light of all the injuries to Patrick Vieira. On 2 December 2007, against Fiorentina, he damaged his left knee, with a torn cruciate ligament and damage to two other ligaments in it. He was expected to be out for the rest of the 2007–08 season.

In the 2008–09 season after recovering from injury, Dacourt did not feature as regularly and was not in Inter manager José Mourinho's plans.

=== Fulham and Standard Liège ===
On 2 February 2009, Dacourt joined English side Fulham on loan until the end of the 2008–09 season after being signed by Roy Hodgson. However, he had to settle for being confined to mainly substitute appearances due to the impressive form of Fulham's midfield and also Dacourt picking up some injury niggles, Dacourt's move to Fulham was not made permanent come the summer, Dacourt briefly returned to Inter where his contract then expired and he became a free agent.

Dacourt signed a one-year contract with Standard Liège on 23 September 2009. He was brought in to replace Steven Defour who had an injury on his foot and should be inactive for three months, Defour was the central midfield partner to Axel Witsel. On 8 February 2010, Standard Liège declared the end of his contract.

== International career ==
Dacourt played for France at the 1996 Summer Olympics.

After impressing for Leeds United, his first senior appearance with the national team came against hosts South Korea in a match in the FIFA Confederations Cup in 2001, which France won 0–5, as they went on to win the tournament. He was a member of the French team that won the 2003 FIFA Confederations Cup and also appeared at UEFA Euro 2004.

=== International goals ===
(France score listed first, score column indicates score after each Dacourt goal)

Goal	Date	Venue	Opponent	Score	Result	Competition
1	10 September 2003	Bežigrad Stadium, Ljubljana, Slovenia	Slovenia	2–0	2–0	UEFA Euro 2004 qualifying

== Personal life ==
He is the brother-in-law of fellow footballer Norman Sylla.

== Career statistics ==
Appearances and goals by club, season and competition
Club	Season	League			Cup (Note: Includes Coupe de France, Coupe de la Ligue, Coppa Italia, Supercoppa Italiana, FA Cup and EFL Cup.)		Continental (Note: Includes UEFA Champions League, UEFA Cup and UEFA Intertoto-Cup.)		Total	
Club	Season	Division	Apps	Goals	Apps	Goals	Apps	Goals	Apps	Goals
Strasbourg	1992–93	Division 1	6	0	–		–		6	0
Strasbourg	1993–94	Division 1	8	0	1	0	–		9	0
Strasbourg	1994–95	Division 1	18	0	1	0	–		19	0
Strasbourg	1995–96	Division 1	34	0	5	0	8	0	47	0
Strasbourg	1996–97	Division 1	31	1	8	1	–		39	2
Strasbourg	1997–98	Division 1	30	3	1	0	6	0	39	3
Strasbourg	Total		127	4	16	1	14	0	157	5
Everton	1998–99	Premier League	30	2	6	1	–		36	3
Lens	1999–00	Division 1	26	1	2	0	9	2	37	3
Leeds United	2000–01	Premier League	33	3	1	0	14	0	48	3
Leeds United	2001–02	Premier League	17	0	2	0	6	0	25	0
Leeds United	2002–03	Premier League	7	0	–		2	0	9	0
Leeds United	Total		57	3	3	0	20	0	80	3
Roma (loan)	2002–03	Serie A	18	0	5	0	–		23	0
Roma	2003–04	Serie A	27	1	2	0	4	0	33	1
Roma	2004–05	Serie A	23	0	3	0	2	0	28	0
Roma	2005–06	Serie A	26	1	5	0	7	0	38	1
Roma	Total		76	2	10	0	13	0	99	2
Inter Milan	2006–07	Serie A	24	0	6	0	7	0	37	0
Inter Milan	2007–08	Serie A	9	0	1	0	3	0	13	0
Inter Milan	2008–09	Serie A	1	0	–		–		1	0
Inter Milan	Total		34	0	7	0	10	0	51	0
Fulham (loan)	2008–09	Premier League	9	0	3	0	–		12	0
Standard Liège	2009–10	Pro League	8	0	–		–		8	0
Career total			385	12	52	2	66	2	503	16

== Honours ==
Strasbourg

- UEFA Intertoto Cup: 1995
- Coupe de la Ligue: 1996–97

Inter Milan

- Serie A: 2006–07, 2007–08
- Supercoppa Italiana: 2006, 2008

France

- FIFA Confederations Cup: 2001, 2003
