= Zé Maria =

Zé Maria is a nickname for various people with the given name José Maria, and may refer to these Brazilians:

- Zé Maria (footballer, born 1931), born José Maria de Carvalho Sales, Brazilian football midfielder
- Zé Maria (footballer, born 1939), born José Maria dos Santos Motta, Brazilian football defender
- Zé Maria (footballer, born 1942), born José Maria da Silva, Brazilian football forward
- Zé Maria (footballer, born 1949), born José Maria Rodrigues Alves, Brazilian football right-back who was 1970 FIFA World Cup champion
- Zé Maria (politician) (born 1957), Brazilian politician
- Zé Maria (footballer, born 1973), born José Marcelo Ferreira, Brazilian football wing-back who won bronze medal at the 1996 Summer Olympics
- Zé Maria (footballer, born 1976), born José Mario Claudino, Brazilian football midfielder

== See also ==
- José María
- Zémaria, Brazilian electro musical group
