= 2006 Supercoppa Italiana =

- Event: Supercoppa Italiana
Inter Milan	Roma
Serie A	Coppa Italia
4	3
- After extra time
- Date: 26 August 2006
- Venue: San Siro, Milan, Italy
- Referee: Massimiliano Saccani
- Attendance: 45,528

The 2006 Supercoppa Italiana was a match contested by the 2005–06 Serie A winners Inter Milan and the 2005–06 Coppa Italia runners-up Roma. While Juventus were originally the first-placed team in Serie A, the title was put sub judice due to their involvement in the Calciopoli scandal, with Inter Milan instead declared champions by the Italian Football Federation (FIGC) on 26 July 2006.

The match resulted in a 4–3 win for Inter Milan after extra time.

== Match details ==
26 August 2006
20:45 CET

Inter Milan	4–3 (a.e.t.)	Roma
Vieira 44', 74'; Crespo 65'; Figo 95'	(Report)	Mancini 18'; Aquilani 25', 34'

San Siro, Milan
Attendance: 45,528
Referee: Massimiliano Saccani

Inter Milan	Roma

INTER:
GK	1	(Italy) Francesco Toldo
RB	4	(Argentina) Javier Zanetti (c)
CB	23	(Italy) Marco Materazzi
CB	25	(Argentina) Walter Samuel
LB	11	(Italy) Fabio Grosso		(substituted off) 54'
RM	7	(Portugal) Luís Figo
CM	14	(France) Patrick Vieira	(yellow card) 30'
CM	19	(Argentina) Esteban Cambiasso	(yellow card) 14'
LM	5	(Serbia) Dejan Stanković		(substituted off) 105'
CF	10	(Brazil) Adriano		(substituted off) 61'
CF	8	(Sweden) Zlatan Ibrahimović
Substitutes:
GK	12	(Brazil) Júlio César
CB	77	(Italy) Marco Andreolli
RB	13	(Brazil) Maicon	(yellow card) 80'	(substituted on) 54'
MF	21	(Argentina) Santiago Solari
MF	15	(France) Olivier Dacourt		(substituted on) 105'
FW	9	(Argentina) Julio Cruz
FW	18	(Argentina) Hernán Crespo		(substituted on) 61'
Manager:
(Italy) Roberto Mancini

ROMA:
GK	32	(Brazil) Doni
RB	2	(Italy) Christian Panucci
CB	5	(France) Philippe Mexès
CB	13	(Romania) Cristian Chivu	(red card) 100'
LB	25	(Argentina) Leandro Cufré
DM	16	(Italy) Daniele De Rossi
DM	8	(Italy) Alberto Aquilani		(substituted off) 81'
RW	11	(Brazil) Rodrigo Taddei	(yellow card) 44'	(substituted off) 66'
AM	20	(Italy) Simone Perrotta
LW	30	(Brazil) Mancini
CF	10	(Italy) Francesco Totti (c)		(substituted off) 72'
Substitutes:
GK	1	(Italy) Gianluca Curci
DF	21	(Italy) Matteo Ferrari
LB	22	(Italy) Max Tonetto		(substituted on) 81'
RB	77	(Italy) Marco Cassetti	(yellow card) 70'	(substituted on) 66'
DM	14	(Senegal) Ricardo Faty
FW	9	(Italy) Vincenzo Montella
FW	99	(Egypt) Mido	(yellow card) 112'	(substituted on) 72'
Manager:
(Italy) Luciano Spalletti

MATCH OFFICIALS

- Assistant referees:
- Fourth official:

MATCH RULES

- 90 minutes.
- 30 minutes of extra-time if necessary.
- Penalty shoot-out if scores still level.
- Seven named substitutes
- Maximum of 3 substitutions.

== See also ==
- 2006–07 Inter Milan season
- 2006–07 AS Roma season

Played between same clubs:

- 2007 Supercoppa Italiana
- 2008 Supercoppa Italiana
- 2010 Supercoppa Italiana
