= Goran Slavkovski =

Footballer (born 1989)

Personal information
- Date of birth: 8 April 1989 (age 37)
- Place of birth: Malmö, Sweden
- Height: 1.91 m (6 ft 3 in)
- Position: Forward

Youth career
- FBK Balkan
- 2004–2005: Malmö FF

Senior career*
Years	Team	Apps	(Gls)
2005–2009	Inter Milan	1	(0)
2008	→ Sheffield United	0	(0)
2010	VfL Bochum II	8	(1)
2011–2012	IF Limhamn Bunkeflo	9	(0)
2013–2017	KSF Makedonija	38	(24)
Total		56	(25)

International career
2008	Macedonia U21	3	(0)
- * Club domestic league appearances and goals

Goran Slavkovski (Macedonian: Горан Славковски; born 8 April 1989) is a former professional footballer who played as a forward. He made his only Serie A appearance for Inter Milan at the age of 17 years and 1 month – a then club record. Born in Sweden, he represented the Macedonia U21 internationally.

== Club career ==
=== Early career ===
Earlier in his career, Slavkovski was nicknamed "Ibrahimović II", because of his similar stature and style of play to the Swedish striker, and as he also played for FBK Balkan and Malmö FF.

=== Inter Milan ===
Slavkovski made his first team debut with Inter Milan at the age of 17 years and one month on 7 May 2006 in a Serie A league match against Siena, taking the field at the 83rd minute, thus becoming the youngest footballer ever to play for Inter. This record has since been broken by Federico Bonazzoli. Previously, the record was held by Giuseppe Bergomi.

He made his Coppa Italia debut against Messina Peloro, on 29 November 2006.

=== Sheffield United ===
On 30 January 2008, Inter reached a loan agreement with Middlesbrough which fell through after he failed a medical and would be unlikely to challenge for a first team place. The next day Inter announced to have loaned Slavkovski to Sheffield United. On 18 March 2008, Sheffield United manager Kevin Blackwell claimed that he was still not ready to play in the first team stating that he would play in the reserve team where he could be assessed. Slavkovski returned to Italy at the end of the season without having made a first team appearance for the Blades. He did, however, make six appearances for the reserve team, scoring twice.

=== 2008–09 season and beyond ===
On 27 June 2008, Slavkovski confirmed a five-year deal with Hajduk Split. It was subsequently confirmed that he was in a very weak physical condition as a result of unsporting behavior and that it would have taken weeks for him to regain fitness. The announced transfer was later cancelled due to his condition, and Slavovski remained contracted with Inter. In October 2008, he started training with Malmö FF, confirming he was still an Inter player and announcing that he will stay on in Sweden for the remainder of the year.

His contract with Inter expired in June 2009, and was not extended; since then, he allegedly rejected a number of offers from Serie B and Lega Pro Prima Divisione clubs. On 22 January 2010, it was announced that VfL Bochum II had signed Slavkovski. He signed a six-month contract with the option to renew the contract. Slavkovski also had a trial with Barnet. He was however released by the end of the season, after failing to play a single game for the club's first team. Since then, his career has faded into obscurity and, in 2011, he returned to Sweden where he briefly joined third division amateurs IF Limhamn Bunkeflo.

== International career ==
Recently the media reported a "war" going on between the Macedonian and Swedish football federations, in attempt to get him to join their national football teams. Slavkovski and his father stated that it would be an honour to play for his country of origin, Macedonia.

Slavkovski also met the Macedonian Prime Minister where they talked about his chances playing for the Macedonian national team. The Prime Minister handed him a football jersey with his name on the backside.

On 11 June 2008, Slavkovski finally spoke out about his international career and decided to play for Macedonia. In August 2008 Slavkovski made his debut for the Macedonia U21 national team, in the qualification matches against Estonia and Norway. He has made three scoreless appearances hitherto.

== Career statistics ==
=== Club ===
Appearances and goals by club, season and competition
Club	Season	League			Cup		Total	
Club	Season	Division	Apps	Goals	Apps	Goals	Apps	Goals
Inter Milan	2005–06	Serie A	1	0	—		1	0
Inter Milan	2006–07	Serie A	0	0	1	0	1	0
Inter Milan	2007–08	Serie A	0	0	—		0	0
Inter Milan	2008–09	Serie A	0	0	—		0	0
Inter Milan	Total		1	0	1	0	2	0
Sheffield United (loan)	2007–08	EFL Championship	0	0	—		0	0
VfL Bochum II	2009–10	Regionalliga West	8	1	—		8	1
IF Limhamn Bunkeflo	2011	Division 1 Södra	9	0	—		9	0
KSF Makedonija	2013–2014	Division 6 Södra Skåne	30	20	—		30	20
KSF Makedonija	2014–2015	Division 5 Sydvästra B Skåne	6	2	—		6	2
KSF Makedonija	2016	Division 7 Sydvästra Skåne	2	2	—		2	2
KSF Makedonija	Total		14	24	—		14	24
Career total			56	25	1	0	57	25
