= Marco Andreolli =

Italian footballer (born 1986)

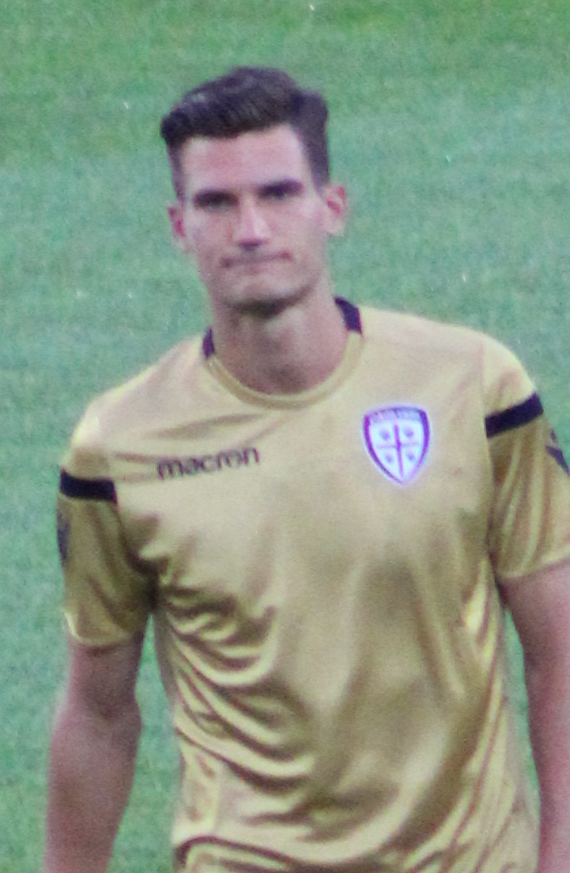
- Andreolli in 2017

Personal information
- Full name: Marco Giancarlo Andreolli
- Date of birth: 10 June 1986 (age 40)
- Place of birth: Ponte dell'Olio, Italy
- Height: 1.88 m (6 ft 2 in)
- Position: Centre-back

Youth career
- 1994–2003: Padova
- 2003–2005: Inter Milan

Senior career*
Years	Team	Apps	(Gls)
2005–2007	Inter Milan	7	(0)
2007–2010	Roma	8	(0)
2008	→ Vicenza (loan)	3	(0)
2008–2009	→ Sassuolo (loan)	28	(1)
2010–2011	Chievo	18	(0)
2011	Inter Milan	0	(0)
2011	→ Chievo (loan)	10	(0)
2011–2013	Chievo	51	(3)
2013–2017	Inter Milan	16	(2)
2015–2016	→ Sevilla (loan)	7	(0)
2017–2019	Cagliari	23	(0)
2019	Chievo	8	(0)

International career
2003–2004	Italy U18	2	(0)
2004–2005	Italy U19	9	(0)
2005	Italy U20	1	(0)
2006–2009	Italy U21	24	(0)
- * Club domestic league appearances and goals

Marco Giancarlo Andreolli (born 10 June 1986) is an Italian retired professional footballer who played as a centre-back.

== Club career ==
=== Padova and Inter Milan ===
Andreolli began playing with Padova's youth system before being signed by Inter in 2003. He made his Serie A debut against Reggina in May 2005, aged 18, and made two more appearances in the 2005–06 Serie A.

On 29 November 2006, during a Coppa Italia match against Messina, Andreolli scored his first professional goal in the 6th minute. Inter won this game 4–0.

=== Roma ===
On 27 July 2007, Andreolli signed with Roma on a co-ownership deal as part of the agreement that brought Cristian Chivu to Inter, he was tagged as €3 million for half of the rights. He spent the second half of the 2007–08 season on loan to Vicenza in Serie B.

His transfer was later fully acquired by Roma during the 2008 summer transfer window, for free, and Andreolli was subsequently loaned out to newly promoted Serie B side Sassuolo for the entire 2008–09 season in order to gain first team experience.

On 22 October 2009, he scored a 93rd-minute equaliser for Roma against Fulham in a UEFA Europa League group stage fixture.

=== Chievo ===
On 24 August 2010, Andreolli completed a transfer to fellow Serie A side Chievo to gain more playing time. As he only had one-year left in his contract, he was sold for €800,000.

With the number 3, Andreolli made his competitive debut five days after the transfer in the opening matchday by starting in a 2–1 win against Catania. On 24 January 2011, Inter bought back half of Andreolli's registration rights from Chievo, for €885,000. He also returned to Chievo on loan. However, on 22 June he was sold back to Chievo for €500,000. In the same window, Michele Rigione joined Inter for €500,000 outright.

Andreolli spent two more seasons with Chievo before returning to Inter again in 2013 as a free agent.

=== Return to Inter Milan ===
On 11 May 2013, it was announced that Andreolli would move back to Inter on a free transfer. He was also eligible to one of the four club-trained players in the squad for UEFA competitions, otherwise Inter would be force to vacant the quota and the squad would be reduced as a consequence.

He made his return debut on 3 November, playing the last nine minutes of 3–0 away win against Udinese at the Stadio Friuli. On 18 May 2014, Andreolli scored his only goal of the season, opening a 2–1 loss away to Chievo.

On 11 January 2015, in Inter's 3–1 home win over Genoa, Andreolli captained Inter for the first time in his career, playing full-90 minutes in the process. In the post-match interview, Andreolli said that "it was a dream come true" to captain Inter at San Siro.

On 31 August 2015, after totalling just ten league appearances in two years at Inter, Andreolli moved abroad for the first time, being loaned to Spain's Sevilla for the upcoming campaign. Inter also failed to qualify to the European stage that season, thus Andreolli was not require to fill UEFA quota.

Due to injury to Adil Rami, he made his La Liga debut on 11 September, partnering Timothée Kolodziejczak in a 1–1 draw at Levante. On 21 November, he tore his Achilles tendon in a 2–0 loss to Real Sociedad, putting him out for the rest of the season.

On 30 June 2017, Andreolli become a free agent after Inter decided not to extend his contract.

=== Cagliari ===
After becoming a free agent, on 7 July 2017, Andreolli joined Cagliari by signing a two-year contract.

=== Return to Chievo ===
On 31 January 2019, Andreolli signed to Chievo.

== International career ==
Andreolli played from 2006 to 2009 for the Italy U-21 national team under coach Pierluigi Casiraghi.

== Personal life ==
In an interview in June 2006, Andreolli stated that he was a fan of Inter Milan since he was a kid. He also said that he grew up idolising ex-Inter defenders Riccardo Ferri and Giuseppe Bergomi, but added that his favourite player was Marco van Basten.

== Career statistics ==
Appearances and goals by club, season and competition
Club	Season	League		Cup		Continental (Note: Includes UEFA Champions League and UEFA Europa League.)		Other (Note: Includes Supercoppa Italiana.)		Total	
Club	Season	Apps	Goals	Apps	Goals	Apps	Goals	Apps	Goals	Apps	Goals
Inter Milan	2004–05	1	0	0	0	0	0	–	–	1	0
Inter Milan	2005–06	2	0	2	0	1	0	0	0	5	0
Inter Milan	2006–07	4	0	2	1	1	0	0	0	7	1
Inter Milan	Total	7	0	4	1	2	0	0	0	13	1
Roma	2007–08	0	0	0	0	0	0	–	–	0	0
Vicenza (loan)	2007–08	3	0	0	0	–	–	–	–	3	0
Sassuolo (loan)	2008–09	28	1	0	0	–	–	–	–	28	1
Roma	2009–10	8	0	1	0	6	1	–	–	15	1
Chievo	2010–11	28	0	1	0	–	–	–	–	29	0
Chievo	2011–12	23	1	1	0	–	–	–	–	24	1
Chievo	2012–13	28	2	0	0	–	–	–	–	28	2
Chievo	Total	79	3	2	0	0	0	0	0	81	3
Inter Milan	2013–14	4	1	2	0	–	–	–	–	6	1
Inter Milan	2014–15	6	0	1	0	6	0	–	–	13	0
Sevilla (loan)	2015–16	7	0	0	0	2	0	–	–	9	0
Inter Milan	2016–17	6	1	0	0	1	0	–	–	7	1
Cagliari	2017–18	23	0	1	0	–	–	–	–	24	0
Cagliari	2018–19	3	0	1	0	–	–	–	–	4	0
Cagliari	Total	26	0	2	0	0	0	0	0	28	0
Chievo	2018–19	8	0	0	0	–	–	–	–	8	0
Total career		188	7	12	1	17	1	0	0	211	8

== Honours ==
Inter Reserves

- Coppa Italia Primavera: 2005–06

Inter

- Coppa Italia: 2005–06
- Supercoppa Italiana: 2006
- Serie A: 2005–06, 2006–07

Roma

- Supercoppa Italiana: 2007

Italy U21

- UEFA European Under-21 Championship bronze:2009
