= Zé Maria (footballer, born 1939) =

Brazilian footballer

Personal information
- Full name: José Maria dos Santos Motta
- Date of birth: May 27, 1939 (age 87)
- Place of birth: Piauí, Brazil
- Height: 6 ft 1 in (1.85 m)
- Position: Defender

Youth career
- Fluminense
- Canto do Rio

Senior career*
Years	Team	Apps	(Gls)
1959–1965	Botafogo		
1964	→ Bonsucesso (loan)		
1966	Náutico		
1966	Olaria		
1966	Internacional		
1967–1968	Baltimore Bays	17	(0)
1969	Washington Whips	2	(0)
Total		19	(0)
- * Club domestic league appearances and goals

José Maria dos Santos Motta (born May 27, 1939), commonly known as Zé Maria, is a former Brazilian soccer player who played in the NASL.

== Career statistics ==
=== Club ===
Club	Season	League			Cup		Other		Total	
Club	Season	Division	Apps	Goals	Apps	Goals	Apps	Goals	Apps	Goals
Baltimore Bays	1967	NPSL	12	0	0	0	0	0	12	0
Baltimore Bays	1968	NASL	5	0	0	0	0	0	5	0
Baltimore Bays	Total		17	0	0	0	0	0	17	0
Washington Whips	1969	NASL	2	0	0	0	0	0	2	0
Career total			19	0	0	0	0	0	19	0
