= 2019–20 Inter Milan season =

Inter Milan
2019–20 season
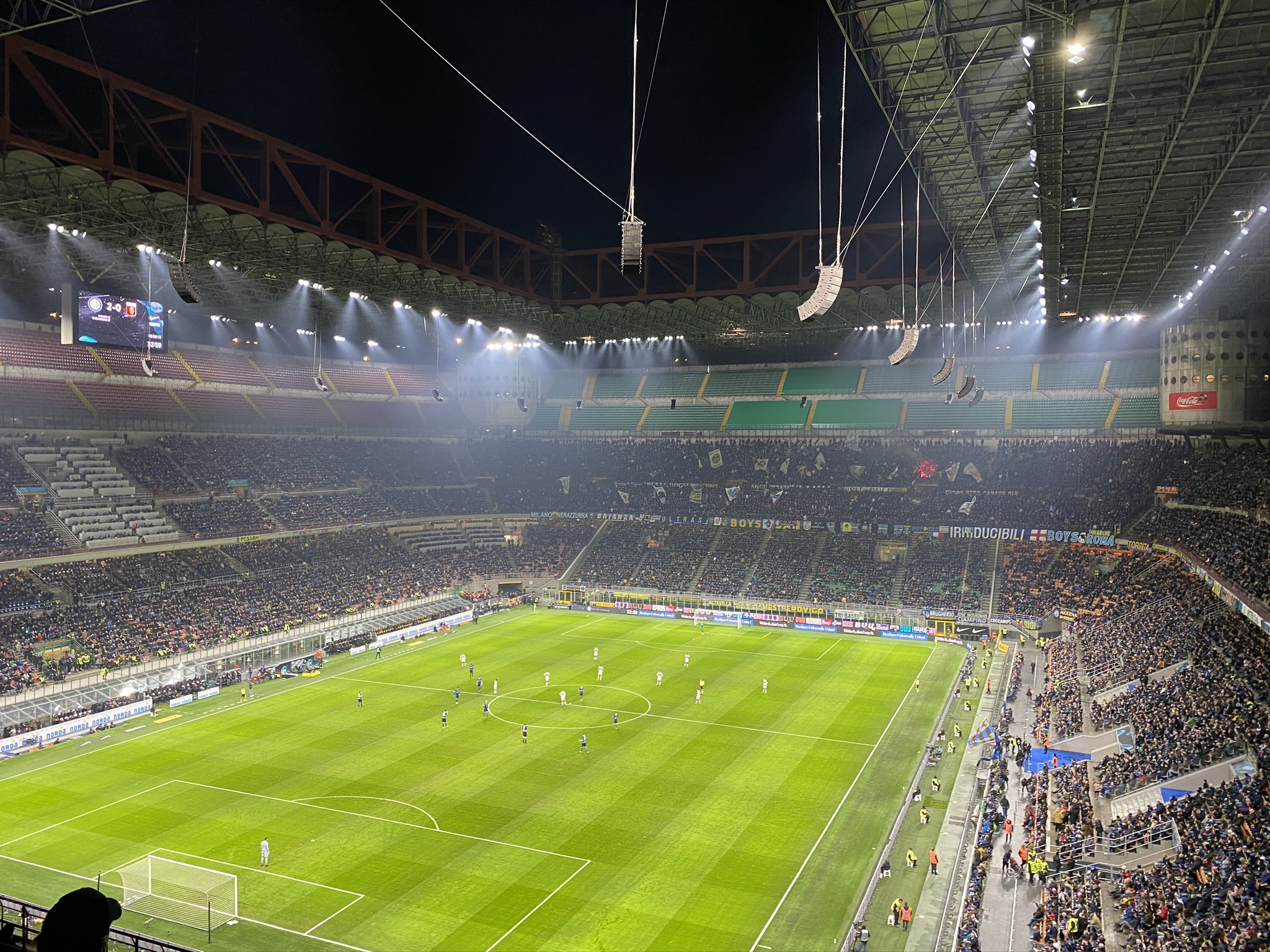
- The San Siro during Inter's match against Genoa, 21 December 2019
- President: Steven Zhang
- Manager: Antonio Conte
- Stadium: San Siro
- Serie A: 2nd
- Coppa Italia: Semi-finals
- UEFA Champions League: Group stage
- UEFA Europa League: Runners-up
- Top goalscorer: League: Romelu Lukaku (23); All: Romelu Lukaku (35)
- Highest home attendance: 75,923 (vs Juventus, 6 October 2019)
- Lowest home attendance: 0 (all home matches were played behind closed doors starting 27 February 2020)
- Average home league attendance: 41,557
Home colours	Away colours	Third colours

The 2019–20 season was Inter Milan's 111th in existence and 104th consecutive season in the top flight of Italian football. The side competed in Serie A, the Coppa Italia, the UEFA Champions League and the UEFA Europa League.

== Kits ==
Supplier: Nike / Sponsor: Pirelli

Outfield players kits

Home	Home alt.	Home alt. 2	Home 2020–21	Away	Away alt.	Away 2020–21	Third

Goalkeeper kits

Goalkeeper 1	Goalkeeper 2	Goalkeeper 3	UCL / UEL Goalkeeper 1	UCL / UEL Goalkeeper 2	Goalkeeper 1 2020–21	Goalkeeper 2 2020–21

== Season overview ==
On 26 May 2019, Inter beat Empoli 2–1 at San Siro in the final round of the 2018–19 Serie A season, which confirmed qualification for the UEFA Champions League group stage. On 30 May 2019, Inter dismissed Luciano Spalletti from his position as head coach. On 31 May 2019, Inter appointed Antonio Conte as their new manager on a three-year contract.

== Players ==
=== Squad information ===
As of 1 August 2020

No.	Name	Nat	Position(s)	Date of birth (age)	Signed in	Contract ends	Signed from	Apps.	Goals	Notes
Goalkeepers
1	Samir Handanović	(Slovenia)	GK	14 July 1984 (aged 36)	2012	2021	(Italy) Udinese	292	0	Captain
27	Daniele Padelli ^{HG}	(Italy)	GK	25 October 1985 (aged 34)	2017	2020	(Italy) Torino	3	0	
46	Tommaso Berni ^{HG}	(Italy)	GK	6 March 1983 (aged 37)	2014	2020	(Italy) Torino	0	0	
Defenders
2	Diego Godín	(Uruguay)	CB	16 February 1986 (aged 34)	2019	2022	(Spain) Atlético Madrid	23	1	
6	Stefan de Vrij	(Netherlands)	CB	5 February 1992 (aged 28)	2018	2023	(Italy) Lazio	62	6	
13	Andrea Ranocchia ^{HG}	(Italy)	CB	16 February 1988 (aged 32)	2011	2021	(Italy) Genoa	156	9	Vice-captain
15	Ashley Young	(England)	LB / LWB / RB	9 July 1985 (aged 35)	2020	2021	(England) Manchester United	18	4	
18	Kwadwo Asamoah	(Ghana)	LB / LWB / LM / CM	9 December 1988 (aged 31)	2018	2021	(Italy) Juventus	40	0	
31	Lorenzo Pirola ^{U21}	(Italy)	CB	20 February 2002 (aged 18)	2019	2025	(Italy) Youth Sector	1	0	
33	Danilo D'Ambrosio ^{HG}	(Italy)	RB / LB / CB	9 September 1988 (aged 31)	2014	2021	(Italy) Torino	172	13	
34	Cristiano Biraghi ^{CT}	(Italy)	LB / LWB	1 September 1992 (aged 27)	2019	2020	(Italy) Fiorentina	26	2	Loan
37	Milan Škriniar	(Slovakia)	CB	11 February 1995 (aged 25)	2017	2023	(Italy) Sampdoria	105	4	
95	Alessandro Bastoni ^{U21}	(Italy)	CB	13 April 1999 (aged 21)	2017	2023	(Italy) Atalanta	25	2	
Midfielders
5	Roberto Gagliardini ^{HG}	(Italy)	DM / CM	8 April 1994 (aged 26)	2017	2023	(Italy) Atalanta	91	11	
8	Matías Vecino	(Uruguay)	CM / DM	24 August 1991 (aged 29)	2017	2022	(Italy) Fiorentina	79	8	
11	Victor Moses	(Nigeria)	LW / RW / RM	12 December 1990 (aged 29)	2020	2020	(England) Chelsea	12	0	Loan
12	Stefano Sensi ^{HG}	(Italy)	DM / CM	5 August 1995 (aged 25)	2019	2020	(Italy) Sassuolo	12	3	Loan
20	Borja Valero	(Spain)	CM / AM	12 January 1985 (aged 35)	2017	2020	(Italy) Fiorentina	82	4	
23	Nicolò Barella ^{HG}	(Italy)	CM	7 February 1997 (aged 23)	2019	2020	(Italy) Cagliari	27	1	Loan
24	Christian Eriksen	(Denmark)	AM / CM	14 February 1992 (aged 28)	2020	2024	(England) Tottenham Hotspur	17	1	
32	Lucien Agoumé ^{U21}	(France)	CM / AM	9 February 2002 (aged 18)	2019	2022	(France) Sochaux	3	0	
77	Marcelo Brozović	(Croatia)	DM / CM / AM	16 November 1992 (aged 27)	2015	2022	(Croatia) Dinamo Zagreb	165	18	
87	Antonio Candreva ^{HG}	(Italy)	RM / RW	28 February 1987 (aged 33)	2016	2021	(Italy) Lazio	124	12	
Forwards
7	Alexis Sánchez	(Chile)	ST / SS / LW / RW / AM	19 December 1988 (aged 31)	2019	2020	(England) Manchester United	22	4	Loan
9	Romelu Lukaku	(Belgium)	ST	13 May 1993 (aged 27)	2019	2024	(England) Manchester United	36	23	
10	Lautaro Martínez	(Argentina)	ST / SS	22 August 1997 (aged 23)	2018	2023	(Argentina) Racing	62	20	
30	Sebastiano Esposito ^{U21}	(Italy)	ST	2 July 2002 (aged 18)	2019	2022	(Italy) Youth Sector	7	1	
Players transferred during the season
16	Matteo Politano ^{HG}	(Italy)	RW / LW / SS	3 August 1993 (aged 26)	2019	2023	(Italy) Sassuolo	47	5	Out on loan
19	Valentino Lazaro	(Austria)	RM / RWB / RB / RW	24 March 1996 (aged 23)	2019	2023	(Germany) Hertha BSC	6	0	Out on loan
21	Federico Dimarco ^{CT}	(Italy)	LB / LWB	10 November 1997 (aged 22)	2018	2023	(Switzerland) Sion	4	0	Out on loan

- Note: Serie A imposes a cap on the first team squad at 25 players, with additional requirements on homegrown players (marked as ^{HG}) and club-trained players (marked as ^{CT}). However, league rules allow for unlimited club-trained players that are under-21 (marked as ^{U21}).

== Transfers ==
=== In ===
==== Transfers ====
Date	Pos.	Player	Age	Moving from	Fee	Notes	Source
Summer
19 June 2019	FW	(Italy) Matteo Politano	25	(Italy) Sassuolo	€20M	Option to buy exercised	
19 June 2019	FW	(Italy) Eddie Salcedo	17	(Italy) Genoa	€8M	Option to buy exercised	
28 June 2019	GK	(Brazil) Gabriel Brazão	18	(Italy) Parma	€6.5M	Part of the Andrea Adorante deal	
1 July 2019	DF	(Uruguay) Diego Godín	33	(Spain) Atlético Madrid	Free	Signed as a free agent	
1 July 2019	MF	(Austria) Valentino Lazaro	23	(Germany) Hertha BSC	€22M		
5 July 2019	MF	(France) Lucien Agoumé	17	(France) Sochaux	€4.5M		
12 July 2019	GK	(Romania) Ionuț Radu	22	(Italy) Genoa	€12M	Buy-back clause exercised	
8 August 2019	FW	(Belgium) Romelu Lukaku	26	(England) Manchester United	€65M	Additional bonuses of €10M	
Winter
17 January 2020	DF	(England) Ashley Young	34	(England) Manchester United	€1.5M		
28 January 2020	MF	(Denmark) Christian Eriksen	27	(England) Tottenham Hotspur	€20M		
31 January 2020	FW	(Uruguay) Martín Satriano	18	(Uruguay) Nacional	N/A		

==== On loan ====
Date	Pos.	Player	Age	Moving from	Fee	Notes	Source
Summer
2 July 2019	MF	(Italy) Stefano Sensi	23	(Italy) Sassuolo	€5M	Option to buy for €22M	
12 July 2019	MF	(Italy) Nicolò Barella	22	(Italy) Cagliari	€12M	Obligation to buy for €25M plus bonuses	
29 August 2019	DF	(Italy) Cristiano Biraghi	26	(Italy) Fiorentina	N/A	Option to buy for €12M	
29 August 2019	FW	(Chile) Alexis Sánchez	30	(England) Manchester United	N/A		
Winter
23 January 2020	MF	(Nigeria) Victor Moses	29	(England) Chelsea	N/A	Option to buy for €12M	

==== Loan returns ====
Date	Pos.	Player	Age	Moving from	Fee	Notes	Source
Summer
30 June 2019	GK	(Italy) Michele Di Gregorio	21	(Italy) Novara	Loan return		
30 June 2019	GK	(Romania) Ionuț Radu	21	(Italy) Genoa	Loan return	Subsequently, sold to Genoa	
30 June 2019	GK	(Italy) Marco Pissardo	21	(Italy) Monopoli	Loan return		
30 June 2019	DF	(Argentina) Cristian Ansaldi	32	(Italy) Torino	Loan return	Subsequently, sold to Torino	
30 June 2019	DF	(Italy) Andrea Bandini	25	(Italy) Rimini	Loan return		
30 June 2019	DF	(Italy) Alessandro Bastoni	20	(Italy) Parma	Loan return		
30 June 2019	DF	(Italy) Tommaso Brignoli	19	(Italy) Rende	Loan return		
30 June 2019	DF	(Italy) Andrea Cagnano	20	(Italy) Pistoiese	Loan return		
30 June 2019	DF	(Italy) Federico Dimarco	21	(Italy) Parma	Loan return		
30 June 2019	DF	(Belgium) Xian Emmers	19	(Italy) Cremonese	Loan return		
30 June 2019	DF	(Guadeloupe) Andreaw Gravillon	21	(Italy) Pescara	Loan return		
30 June 2019	DF	(Italy) Manuel Lombardoni	20	(Italy) Pro Patria	Loan return		
30 June 2019	DF	(Italy) Alessandro Mattioli	21	(Italy) Südtirol	Loan return		
30 June 2019	DF	(Italy) Marco Sala	20	(Italy) Arezzo	Loan return	Subsequently, sold to Sassuolo	
30 June 2019	DF	(Belgium) Zinho Vanheusden	19	(Belgium) Standard Liège	Loan return	Subsequently, sold to Standard Liège	
30 June 2019	MF	(Honduras) Rigoberto Rivas	20	(Italy) Ternana	Loan return		
30 June 2019	MF	(Italy) Andrea Romanò	25	(Italy) Südtirol	Loan return		
30 June 2019	FW	(Italy) Felice D'Amico	18	(Italy) Chievo Verona	Loan return		
30 June 2019	FW	(France) Yann Karamoh	20	(France) Bordeaux	Loan return		
30 June 2019	FW	(Italy) Samuele Longo	27	(Italy) Cremonese	Loan return		
30 June 2019	FW	(Albania) Rey Manaj	22	(Spain) Albacete	Loan return	Subsequently, sold to Albacete	
30 June 2019	FW	(Italy) Andrea Pinamonti	20	(Italy) Frosinone	Loan return		
30 June 2019	FW	(Italy) Matteo Rover	20	(Italy) Pordenone	Loan return		
30 June 2019	FW	(Italy) Vincenzo Tommasone	23	(Italy) Rieti	Loan return		
30 June 2019	FW	(Romania) George Pușcaș	23	(Italy) Palermo	Loan return	Subsequently, sold to Reading	
Winter
31 December 2019	DF	(Italy) Lorenzo Gavioli	20	(Italy) Venezia	Loan return		
31 December 2019	FW	(Brazil) Gabriel Barbosa	23	(Brazil) Flamengo	Loan return		
29 January 2020	GK	(Romania) Ionuț Radu	22	(Italy) Genoa	Loan return		
30 January 2020	MF	(Italy) Marco Pompetti	19	(Italy) Sampdoria	Loan return		
30 May 2020	FW	(Argentina) Mauro Icardi	27	(France) Paris Saint-Germain	Loan return		

=== Out ===
==== Transfers ====
Date	Pos.	Player	Age	Moving to	Fee	Notes	Source
Summer
28 June 2019	FW	(Italy) Andrea Adorante	19	(Italy) Parma	Undisclosed	Part of the Gabriel Brazão deal	
28 June 2019	DF	(Belgium) Zinho Vanheusden	19	(Belgium) Standard Liège	€12.5M		
30 June 2019	DF	(Italy) Marco Sala	20	(Italy) Sassuolo	€5M	Part of the Stefano Sensi deal	
1 July 2019	GK	(Romania) Ionuț Radu	21	(Italy) Genoa	€8M	Sold on loan obligation	
1 July 2019	DF	(Argentina) Cristian Ansaldi	32	(Italy) Torino	€2M	Sold on loan obligation	
1 July 2019	FW	(Albania) Rey Manaj	22	(Spain) Albacete	Undisclosed	Sold on loan obligation	
5 July 2019	DF	(Italy) Nicholas Rizzo	19	(Italy) Genoa	Undisclosed		
9 July 2019	GK	(Italy) Marco Pissardo	21	(Italy) Arezzo	Undisclosed		
18 July 2019	DF	(Italy) Manuel Lombardoni	20	(Italy) Pro Patria	Undisclosed		
18 July 2019	MF	(Italy) Tommaso Brignoli	19	(Italy) Pro Patria	Undisclosed		
19 July 2019	DF	(Italy) Andrea Cagnano	21	(Italy) Novara	Undisclosed		
20 July 2019	DF	(Italy) Alessandro Mattioli	21	(Italy) Modena	Undisclosed		
26 July 2019	DF	(Brazil) Miranda	34	(China) Jiangsu Suning	Free		
7 August 2019	FW	(Romania) George Pușcaș	23	(England) Reading	€8M	Additional bonuses of €2M	
20 August 2019	FW	(Italy) Davide Merola	19	(Italy) Empoli	Undisclosed		
2 September 2019	DF	(Republic of Ireland) Ryan Nolan	20	(Italy) Arezzo	Undisclosed		
Winter
22 January 2020	GK	(Serbia) Vladan Dekić	20	(Italy) Pisa	Undisclosed		
28 January 2020	FW	(Brazil) Gabriel Barbosa	23	(Brazil) Flamengo	€17M	20% sell-on clause	
31 May 2020	FW	(Argentina) Mauro Icardi	27	(France) Paris Saint-Germain	€50M	Additional bonuses of €8M	

==== Loans out ====
Date	Pos.	Player	Age	Moving to	Fee	Notes	Source
Summer
30 June 2019	FW	(Italy) Andrea Pinamonti	20	(Italy) Genoa	N/A	Obligation to buy for €18M	
10 July 2019	GK	(Italy) Michele Di Gregorio	21	(Italy) Pordenone	N/A	Option and counter-option to buy	
11 July 2019	MF	(Belgium) Xian Emmers	19	(Belgium) Waasland-Beveren	N/A		
12 July 2019	GK	(Romania) Ionuț Radu	22	(Italy) Genoa	N/A		
17 July 2019	GK	(Brazil) Gabriel Brazão	18	(Spain) Albacete	N/A		
17 July 2019	DF	(Guadeloupe) Andreaw Gravillon	21	(Italy) Sassuolo	N/A	Option to buy for €9M	
17 July 2019	FW	(France) Yann Karamoh	21	(Italy) Parma	N/A	Obligation to buy for €13M	
18 July 2019	MF	(Italy) Lorenzo Gavioli	19	(Italy) Venezia	N/A	Option and counter-option to buy	
19 July 2019	DF	(Italy) Davide Grassini	19	(Italy) Ravenna	N/A		
31 July 2019	FW	(Italy) Felice D'Amico	18	(Italy) Sampdoria	N/A	Obligation to buy	
1 August 2019	MF	(Italy) Marco Pompetti	19	(Italy) Sampdoria	N/A	Option and counter-option to buy	
2 August 2019	GK	(Italy) Nicola Tintori	19	(Italy) Gozzano	N/A		
5 August 2019	MF	(Belgium) Radja Nainggolan	31	(Italy) Cagliari	N/A		
13 August 2019	MF	(Croatia) Ivan Perišić	30	(Germany) Bayern Munich	€5M	Option to buy for €20M	
13 August 2019	FW	(Argentina) Facundo Colidio	19	(Belgium) Sint-Truiden	N/A		
16 August 2019	FW	(Italy) Samuele Longo	27	(Spain) Deportivo La Coruña	N/A	Potential obligation to buy for €1.5M	
21 August 2019	DF	(Italy) Niccolò Corrado	19	(Italy) Arezzo	N/A		
27 August 2019	MF	(Slovenia) Maj Rorič	19	(Slovakia) Sereď	N/A		
27 August 2019	MF	(Portugal) João Mário	26	(Russia) Lokomotiv Moscow	N/A	Option to buy for €18M	
29 August 2019	DF	(Brazil) Dalbert	25	(Italy) Fiorentina	N/A		
31 August 2019	FW	(Italy) Eddie Salcedo	17	(Italy) Verona	N/A		
2 September 2019	MF	(Honduras) Rigoberto Rivas	21	(Italy) Reggina	N/A		
2 September 2019	FW	(Italy) Vincenzo Tommasone	24	(Italy) Carpi	N/A		
2 September 2019	FW	(Argentina) Mauro Icardi	26	(France) Paris Saint-Germain	N/A	Option to buy for €70M	
Winter
15 January 2020	DF	(Italy) Lorenzo Gavioli	20	(Italy) Ravenna	N/A		
24 January 2020	MF	(Austria) Valentino Lazaro	23	(England) Newcastle United	€1.5M	Option to buy for €23.5M	
28 January 2020	FW	(Italy) Matteo Politano	26	(Italy) Napoli	€2.5M	Obligation to buy for €19M	
30 January 2020	GK	(Romania) Ionuț Radu	22	(Italy) Parma	N/A		
31 January 2020	DF	(Italy) Federico Dimarco	22	(Italy) Hellas Verona	N/A	Option to buy	
31 January 2020	MF	(Italy) Marco Pompetti	19	(Italy) Pisa	N/A	Option to buy	

==== Loans ended ====
Date	Pos.	Player	Age	Moving to	Notes	Source
Summer
30 June 2019	DF	(Italy) Laurens Serpe	18	(Italy) Genoa		
30 June 2019	MF	(Italy) Andrea Rizzo Pinna	19	(Italy) Atalanta		
30 June 2019	DF	(Portugal) Cédric Soares	27	(England) Southampton		
30 June 2019	DF	(Croatia) Šime Vrsaljko	27	(Spain) Atlético Madrid		
30 June 2019	FW	(Senegal) Keita Baldé	24	(France) Monaco		
30 June 2019	FW	(Italy) Matteo Politano	25	(Italy) Sassuolo	Subsequently, bought	
30 June 2019	FW	(Italy) Eddie Salcedo	17	(Italy) Genoa	Subsequently, bought	

== Pre-season and friendlies ==
=== Casinò Lugano Cup ===
14 July 2019 Casinò Lugano Cup	Internazionale	2–1	Lugano	Lugano, Switzerland
17:30 CEST (UTC+02:00)	Sensi 25'; Brozović 45'	Report	Kryeziu 87'	Stadium: Cornaredo Stadium

=== International Champions Cup ===
20 July 2019 ICC	Manchester United	1–0	Internazionale	Kallang, Singapore
13:30 CEST (UTC+02:00)	Greenwood 76'	Report	Brozović (yellow card) 27'; Candreva (yellow card) 71'; Škriniar (yellow card) 87'	Stadium: National Stadium; Attendance: 52,897; Referee: Letchman Gopala Krishnan (Singapore)

24 July 2019 ICC	Juventus	1–1 (4–3 p)	Internazionale	Nanjing, China
13:30 CEST (UTC+02:00)	Bonucci (yellow card) 53'; Ronaldo 68'	Report	De Ligt 10' (o.g.); D'Ambrosio (yellow card) 41'	Stadium: Olympic Sports Centre; Attendance: 48,646; Referee: Zhang Lei (China)
	Penalties
	Cancelo (penalty scored); Ronaldo (penalty scored); Can (penalty scored); Rabiot (penalty missed); Bernardeschi (penalty missed); Demiral (penalty scored)		(penalty missed) Ranocchia; (penalty scored) Pușcaș; (penalty missed) Longo; (penalty scored) João Mário; (penalty scored) Barella; (penalty missed) Valero

4 August 2019 ICC	Tottenham Hotspur	1–1 (3–4 p)	Internazionale	London, England
16:00 CEST (UTC+02:00)	Lucas 3'	Report	Candreva (yellow card) 28'; Sensi 36'; Politano (yellow card) 71'	Stadium: Tottenham Hotspur Stadium; Attendance: 58,905; Referee: Andre Marriner (England)
	Penalties
	Eriksen (penalty missed); Son Heung-min (penalty scored); Nkoudou (penalty scored); Alderweireld (penalty scored); Skipp (penalty missed)		(penalty missed) Pușcaș; (penalty scored) Ranocchia; (penalty scored) Dimarco; (penalty scored) Politano; (penalty scored) João Mário

=== International Super Cup ===
27 July 2019 International Super Cup	Paris Saint-Germain	1–1 (5–6 p)	Internazionale	Macau, China
13:36 CEST (UTC+02:00)	Kehrer 41'; Kurzawa (yellow card) 49'	Report	Longo 90+4'	Stadium: Macau Olympic Sports Centre; Attendance: 8,853; Referee: Fu Ming (China)
	Penalties
	Cavani (penalty scored); Jesé (penalty scored); Diallo (penalty scored); Aouchiche (penalty missed); Arday (penalty scored); Mbe Soh (penalty scored); Zagre (penalty missed)		(penalty scored) Ranocchia; (penalty scored) Gagliardini; (penalty scored) Colidio; (penalty scored) Agoumé; (penalty missed) Candreva; (penalty scored) Longo; (penalty scored) João Mário

=== Friendlies ===
5 August 2019 Friendly	Internazionale	5–1	Pro Sesto	Appiano Gentile
	Martínez; Vecino; Politano	Report	Capelli	Stadium: Angelo Moratti Sports Centre

11 August 2019 Friendly	Internazionale	8–0	Virtus Bergamo	Appiano Gentile
10:00 CEST (UTC+02:00)	Lukaku; Vecino; Esposito	Report		Stadium: Angelo Moratti Sports Centre

18 August 2019 Friendly	Internazionale	2–0	Gozzano	Appiano Gentile
11:00 CEST (UTC+02:00)	Lukaku; Politano	Report		Stadium: Angelo Moratti Sports Centre

27 August 2019 Friendly	Internazionale	4–1	Internazionale Primavera	Appiano Gentile
	Esposito; Barella; Gagliardini	Report	Schirò	Stadium: Angelo Moratti Sports Centre

18 September 2019 Friendly	Internazionale	3–1	Como	Appiano Gentile
	Sánchez; Dimarco; Vezzoni	Report	Gatto	Stadium: Angelo Moratti Sports Centre

7 January 2020 Friendly	Internazionale	4–1	Seregno	Appiano Gentile
	Politano; Esposito; Dimarco	Report	Tomaš	Stadium: Angelo Moratti Sports Centre

=== Trofeo Naranja ===
10 August 2019 Trofeo Naranja	Valencia	1–1 (6–7 p)	Internazionale	Valencia, Spain
21:30 CEST (UTC+02:00)	Wass (yellow card) 25'; Soler 38'	Report	Škriniar (yellow card) 52'; Politano 82' (pen.)	Stadium: Mestalla; Attendance: 44,079; Referee: José María Sánchez Martínez (Spain)
	Penalties
	Lee Kang-in (penalty scored); Torres (penalty scored); Cheryshev (penalty scored); Gómez (penalty scored); Parejo (penalty scored); Kondogbia (penalty scored); Garay (penalty missed)		(penalty scored) Gagliardini; (penalty scored) Vecino; (penalty scored) Dimarco; (penalty scored) Esposito; (penalty scored) Longo; (penalty scored) Asamoah; (penalty scored) Bastoni

== Competitions ==
=== Overview ===
Competition	First match	Last match	Starting round	Final position	Record							
Competition	First match	Last match	Starting round	Final position	Pld	W	D	L	GF	GA	GD	Win %
Serie A	24 August 2019	1 August 2020	Matchday 1	2nd	38	24	10	4	81	36	+45	63.16
Coppa Italia	14 January 2020	13 June 2020	Round of 16	Semi-finals	4	2	1	1	7	4	+3	50.00
Champions League	17 September 2019	10 December 2019	Group stage	Group stage	6	2	1	3	10	9	+1	33.33
Europa League	20 February 2020	21 August 2020	Round of 32	Runners-up	6	5	0	1	15	5	+10	83.33
Total					54	33	12	9	113	54	+59	61.11

Source: Competitions

=== Serie A ===
==== League table ====
Pos	Team	Pld	W	D	L	GF	GA	GD	Pts	Qualification or relegation
1	Juventus (C)	38	26	5	7	76	43	+33	83	Qualification for the Champions League group stage
2	Internazionale	38	24	10	4	81	36	+45	82	Qualification for the Champions League group stage
3	Atalanta	38	23	9	6	98	48	+50	78 (Note: Atalanta finished ahead of Lazio on head-to-head points: Lazio 3–3 Atalanta, Atalanta 3–2 Lazio.)	Qualification for the Champions League group stage
4	Lazio	38	24	6	8	79	42	+37	78	Qualification for the Champions League group stage
5	Roma	38	21	7	10	77	51	+26	70	Qualification for the Europa League group stage

Source: Serie A, Soccerway
Rules for classification: 1) Points; 2) Head-to-head points; 3) Head-to-head goal difference; 4) Goal difference; 5) Goals scored; 6) Draw. (Note: Head-to-head record is used only after all the matches between the teams in question have been played)
(C) Champions

==== Results summary ====
Overall								Home						Away					
Pld	W	D	L	GF	GA	GD	Pts	W	D	L	GF	GA	GD	W	D	L	GF	GA	GD
38	24	10	4	81	36	+45	82	11	6	2	40	17	+23	13	4	2	41	19	+22

Source: Competitive matches

==== Results by round ====
Round	1	2	3	4	5	6	7	8	9	10	11	12	13	14	15	16	17	18	19	20	21	22	23	24	25	26	27	28	29	30	31	32	33	34	35	36	37	38
Ground	H	A	H	A	H	A	H	A	H	A	A	H	A	H	H	A	H	A	H	A	H	A	H	A	H	A	H	A	H	H	A	H	A	A	H	A	H	A
Result	W	W	W	W	W	W	L	W	D	W	W	W	W	W	D	D	W	W	D	D	D	W	W	L	W	L	D	W	W	L	D	W	W	D	D	W	W	W
Position	1	1	1	1	1	1	2	2	2	2	2	2	2	1	1	1	1	1	2	2	2	2	1	3	3	3	3	3	3	3	4	2	2	2	3	2	2	2

Source: Competitive matches
A = Away; H = Home; W = Win; D = Draw; L = Loss

==== Matches ====
Source: 2019–20 Serie A schedule

26 August 2019 1	Internazionale	4–0	Lecce	Milan
20:45 CEST (UTC+02:00)	Brozović 21'; Sensi 24'; Martínez (yellow card) 40'; Lukaku 60'; Candreva 84'	Report	Petriccione (yellow card) 38'; Lapadula (yellow card) 52'; Farias (red card) 76'	Stadium: San Siro; Attendance: 64,188; Referee: Federico La Penna

1 September 2019 2	Cagliari	1–2	Internazionale	Cagliari
20:45 CEST (UTC+02:00)	João Pedro 50'; Nainggolan (yellow card) 60'; Ceppitelli (yellow card) 68'; Pisacane (yellow card) 71'; Ioniță (yellow card) 76'	Report	Brozović (yellow card) 21'; Martínez 25'; Asamoah (yellow card) 45'; Lukaku 72' (pen.); Ranocchia (yellow card) 86'	Stadium: Sardegna Arena; Attendance: 16,412; Referee: Fabio Maresca

14 September 2019 3	Internazionale	1–0	Udinese	Milan
20:45 CEST (UTC+02:00)	Barella (yellow card) 29'; Sensi 44'; Candreva (yellow card) 78'	Report	De Paul (red card) 35'; Becão (yellow card) 36'	Stadium: San Siro; Attendance: 57,991; Referee: Maurizio Mariani

21 September 2019 4	Milan	0–2	Internazionale	Milan
20:45 CEST (UTC+02:00)	Conti (yellow card) 48'; Rebić (yellow card) 88'	Report	Brozović 49'; Lukaku 78'; D'Ambrosio (yellow card) 82'	Stadium: San Siro; Attendance: 70,440; Referee: Daniele Doveri

25 September 2019 5	Internazionale	1–0	Lazio	Milan
21:00 CEST (UTC+02:00)	D'Ambrosio 23', (yellow card) 45+2'; Martínez (yellow card) 90'	Report	Luis Alberto (yellow card) 31'; Bastos (yellow card) 73'; Parolo (yellow card) 81'	Stadium: San Siro; Attendance: 56,175; Referee: Fabio Maresca

28 September 2019 6	Sampdoria	1–3	Internazionale	Genoa
18:00 CEST (UTC+02:00)	Rigoni (yellow card) 16'; Linetty (yellow card) 33'; Jankto 55'	Report	Bastoni (yellow card) 10'; Sensi 20'; Sánchez 22', (yellow card) 43' (yellow-red card) 46'; Gagliardini 61'; Škriniar (yellow card) 81'	Stadium: Stadio Luigi Ferraris; Attendance: 23,694; Referee: Gianpaolo Calvarese

6 October 2019 7	Internazionale	1–2	Juventus	Milan
20:45 CEST (UTC+02:00)	Martínez 18' (pen.); Vecino (yellow card) 88'; Barella (yellow card) 90'	Report	Dybala 4'; Alex Sandro (yellow card) 13'; Higuaín 80'; Can (yellow card) 84'; Pjanić (yellow card) 85'	Stadium: San Siro; Attendance: 75,923; Referee: Gianluca Rocchi

20 October 2019 8	Sassuolo	3–4	Internazionale	Reggio Emilia
12:30 CEST (UTC+02:00)	Berardi 16'; Obiang (yellow card) 24'; Duncan (yellow card) 34'; Magnanelli (yellow card) 40'; Đuričić 74'; Müldür (yellow card) 75'; Boga 82'	Report	Martínez 2', 71' (pen.); Lukaku 38', 45' (pen.); De Vrij (yellow card) 42'; Lazaro (yellow card) 76'; Bastoni (yellow card) 90+2'	Stadium: Mapei Stadium; Attendance: 17,935; Referee: Piero Giacomelli

26 October 2019 9	Internazionale	2–2	Parma	Milan
18:00 CEST (UTC+02:00)	Barella (yellow card) 13'; Candreva 23', (yellow card) 44'; Lukaku 51'; Esposito (yellow card) 81'	Report	Karamoh 26'; Gervinho 30'; Sepe (yellow card) 88'; Darmian (yellow card) 90'	Stadium: San Siro; Attendance: 67,076; Referee: Daniele Chiffi

29 October 2019 10	Brescia	1–2	Internazionale	Brescia
21:00 CET (UTC+01:00)	Cistana (yellow card) 44'; Matějů (yellow card) 45+1'; Škriniar 76' (o.g.); Balotelli (yellow card) 87'	Report	Martínez 23'; Candreva (yellow card) 26'; Gagliardini (yellow card) 44'; Škriniar (yellow card) 62'; Lukaku 63'	Stadium: Stadio Mario Rigamonti; Attendance: 16,500; Referee: Michael Fabbri

2 November 2019 11	Bologna	1–2	Internazionale	Bologna
18:00 CET (UTC+01:00)	Danilo (yellow card) 42'; Soriano 59'; Sansone (yellow card) 74'; Bani (yellow card) 81'; Medel (yellow card) 90+4'	Report	Brozović (yellow card) 35'; Gagliardini (yellow card) 73'; Lukaku 75', 90+2' (pen.); Škriniar (yellow card) 77'; Vecino (yellow card) 86'	Stadium: Renato Dall'Ara; Attendance: 28,498; Referee: Federico La Penna

9 November 2019 12	Internazionale	2–1	Hellas Verona	Milan
18:00 CET (UTC+01:00)	Brozović (yellow card) 32'; Martínez (yellow card) 42'; Vecino 65'; Barella 83', (yellow card) 83'	Report	Verre 19' (pen.); Zaccagni (yellow card) 35'	Stadium: San Siro; Attendance: 66,202; Referee: Paolo Valeri

23 November 2019 13	Torino	0–3	Internazionale	Turin
20:45 CET (UTC+01:00)	Izzo (yellow card) 59'; Aina (yellow card) 73'	Report	Martínez 12', (yellow card) 35'; De Vrij 32'; Lukaku 55'; D'Ambrosio (yellow card) 58'; Škriniar (yellow card) 64'	Stadium: Stadio Olimpico; Attendance: 26,059; Referee: Fabio Maresca

1 December 2019 14	Internazionale	2–1	SPAL	Milan
15:00 CET (UTC+01:00)	Martínez 16', 41'; D'Ambrosio (yellow card) 59'	Report	Valoti 50'; Valdifiori (yellow card) 57'; Igor (yellow card) 77'; Cionek (yellow card) 80'; Murgia (yellow card) 90+4'	Stadium: San Siro; Attendance: 61,221; Referee: Massimiliano Irrati

6 December 2019 15	Internazionale	0–0	Roma	Milan
20:45 CET (UTC+01:00)	Godín (yellow card) 61'; Lazaro (yellow card) 62'; Brozović (yellow card) 80'	Report	Mancini (yellow card) 77'	Stadium: San Siro; Attendance: 67,008; Referee: Gianpaolo Calvarese

15 December 2019 16	Fiorentina	1–1	Internazionale	Florence
20:45 CET (UTC+01:00)	Badelj (yellow card) 52'; Dalbert (yellow card) 69'; Pulgar (yellow card) 80'; Vlahović 90+2'	Report	Valero 8', (yellow card) 73'; Brozović (yellow card) 27'; Bastoni (yellow card) 32'; Martínez (yellow card) 76'	Stadium: Stadio Artemio Franchi; Attendance: 37,537; Referee: Maurizio Mariani

21 December 2019 17	Internazionale	4–0	Genoa	Milan
18:00 CET (UTC+01:00)	Lukaku 31', 71'; Gagliardini 33'; Bastoni (yellow card) 36'; Esposito 64' (pen.)	Report	Cassata (yellow card) 34'; Romero (yellow card) 43'; Agudelo (yellow card) 63'; Favilli (yellow card) 88'	Stadium: San Siro; Attendance: 57,490; Referee: Luca Pairetto

6 January 2020 18	Napoli	1–3	Internazionale	Naples
20:45 CET (UTC+01:00)	Milik 39'	Report	Lukaku 14', 33'; Candreva (yellow card) 29'; Barella (yellow card) 61'; Martínez 62'; Esposito (yellow card) 72'; Sensi (yellow card) 82'; Škriniar (yellow card) 84'	Stadium: Stadio San Paolo; Attendance: 31,191; Referee: Daniele Doveri

11 January 2020 19	Internazionale	1–1	Atalanta	Milan
20:45 CET (UTC+01:00)	Martínez 4'; Sensi (yellow card) 65'; Godín (yellow card) 83'	Report	Hateboer (yellow card) 8'; De Roon (yellow card) 24'; Palomino (yellow card) 42'; Gosens 75'; Malinovskyi (yellow card) 89'	Stadium: San Siro; Attendance: 70,042; Referee: Gianluca Rocchi

19 January 2020 20	Lecce	1–1	Internazionale	Lecce
15:00 CET (UTC+01:00)	Donati (yellow card) 21'; Mancosu 77'; Meccariello (yellow card) 90+3'	Report	Candreva (yellow card) 32'; Bastoni 72'; Valero (yellow card) 88'	Stadium: Via del Mare; Attendance: 25,966; Referee: Piero Giacomelli

26 January 2020 21	Internazionale	1–1	Cagliari	Milan
12:30 CET (UTC+01:00)	Martínez 29', (yellow card) 90+4', (red card) 90+4'; Lukaku (yellow card) 45+3'; Barella (yellow card) 61'; De Vrij (yellow card) 83'; Berni (red card) 90+5'	Report	Nainggolan 78'	Stadium: San Siro; Attendance: 70,465; Referee: Gianluca Manganiello
Note: Tommaso Berni was sent off for dissent while a substitute.

2 February 2020 22	Udinese	0–2	Internazionale	Udine
20:45 CET (UTC+01:00)	Stryger Larsen (yellow card) 17'; Lasagna (yellow card) 87'	Report	Barella (yellow card) 11'; Bastoni (yellow card) 49'; Lukaku 64', 71' (pen.)	Stadium: Stadio Friuli; Attendance: 23,215; Referee: Marco Di Bello

9 February 2020 23	Internazionale	4–2	Milan	Milan
20:45 CET (UTC+01:00)	Vecino (yellow card) 48', (goal) 54'; Brozović 51'; Škriniar (yellow card) 55'; Barella (yellow card) 55'; De Vrij 70'; Lukaku 90+3', (yellow card) 90+4'	Report	Rebić 40'; Ibrahimović 45+1'; Kessié (yellow card) 62'; Conti (yellow card) 79'	Stadium: San Siro; Attendance: 75,817; Referee: Fabio Maresca

16 February 2020 24	Lazio	2–1	Internazionale	Rome
20:45 CET (UTC+01:00)	Immobile 50' (pen.); Lucas (yellow card) 51'; Luiz Felipe (yellow card) 58'; Milinković-Savić 69', (yellow card) 90+4'; Lazzari (yellow card) 90'	Report	Young 44'; De Vrij (yellow card) 48'; Godín (yellow card) 79'	Stadium: Stadio Olimpico; Attendance: 61,000; Referee: Gianluca Rocchi

8 March 2020 26	Juventus	2–0	Internazionale	Turin
20:45 CET (UTC+01:00)	Ramsey 55'; Dybala 67'; Ronaldo (yellow card) 87'	Report	Škriniar (yellow card) 64'; Vecino (yellow card) 71'; Brozović (yellow card) 79'; Padelli (red card) 80'	Stadium: Juventus Stadium; Attendance: 0 Referee: Marco Guida
Note: Match was initially postponed to 13 May from its original date of 1 March due to concerns over the COVID-19 pandemic, but was later moved to 8 March to be played behind closed doors. All subsequent matches were also shuffled to allow for this accommodation. Daniele Padelli was sent off for dissent while a substitute.

21 June 2020 25	Internazionale	2–1	Sampdoria	Milan
21:45 CEST (UTC+02:00)	Lukaku 10'; Martínez 33', (yellow card) 48'; Valero (yellow card) 86'; Gagliardini (yellow card) 90'	Report	Bertolacci (yellow card) 22'; Thorsby 53', (yellow card) 64'; Vieira (yellow card) 90+3'	Stadium: San Siro; Attendance: 0 Referee: Maurizio Mariani
Note: Match was postponed to 21 June from its original date of 23 February due to concerns over the COVID-19 pandemic. All subsequent matches were also shuffled to allow for this accommodation. On 9 March all sports events in Italy were suspended until 3 April. This was the first match played since the COVID-19 pandemic lockdown in Italy.

24 June 2020 27	Internazionale	3–3	Sassuolo	Milan
20:30 CEST (UTC+02:00)	Škriniar (yellow card) 25' (yellow-red card) 90+3'; Lukaku 41' (pen.); Bastoni (yellow card) 44'; Biraghi 45+1'; Valero 86'	Report	Caputo 4'; Rogério (yellow card) 23'; Berardi 81' (pen.); Magnani 89'	Stadium: San Siro; Attendance: 0 Referee: Davide Massa
Note: Match was postponed to 15 March, then to 24 June, from its original date of 8 March due to schedule shuffling to allow for Sassuolo vs Brescia to be played following its previous postponement due to concerns over the COVID-19 pandemic.

28 June 2020 28	Parma	1–2	Internazionale	Parma
21:45 CEST (UTC+02:00)	Gervinho 15'; Dermaku (yellow card) 30'; Kucka (yellow card) 49', (red card) 85'; Kurtić (yellow card) 88'	Report	Martínez (yellow card) 28'; Gagliardini (yellow card) 49'; Berni (red card) 69'; Godín (yellow card) 71'; De Vrij 84'; Bastoni 87'; Moses (yellow card) 90+3'	Stadium: Stadio Ennio Tardini; Attendance: 0 Referee: Fabio Maresca
Note: Tommaso Berni was sent off for dissent while a substitute.

1 July 2020 29	Internazionale	6–0	Brescia	Milan
19:30 CEST (UTC+02:00)	Young 5'; Sánchez 20' (pen.); De Vrij (yellow card) 41'; D'Ambrosio 45'; Gagliardini 53'; Agoumé (yellow card) 64'; Eriksen 83'; Candreva 88'	Report	Matějů (yellow card) 19'; Semprini (yellow card) 62'	Stadium: San Siro; Attendance: 0 Referee: Gianluca Manganiello

5 July 2020 30	Internazionale	1–2	Bologna	Milan
17:15 CEST (UTC+02:00)	Lukaku 22'; Bastoni (yellow card) 41' (yellow-red card) 77'; D'Ambrosio (yellow card) 90+1'	Report	Danilo (yellow card) 15'; Soriano (red card) 57'; Juwara 74', (yellow card) 79'; Palacio (yellow card) 78'; Barrow 80'	Stadium: San Siro; Attendance: 0 Referee: Luca Pairetto

9 July 2020 31	Hellas Verona	2–2	Internazionale	Verona
21:45 CEST (UTC+02:00)	Lazović 2'; Dimarco (yellow card) 29'; Günter (yellow card) 37'; Amrabat (yellow card) 45+2'; Veloso 86'	Report	Valero (yellow card) 45+2'; Candreva 49'; Dimarco 55' (o.g.); Young (yellow card) 65'	Stadium: Marc'Antonio Bentegodi; Attendance: 0 Referee: Massimiliano Irrati

13 July 2020 32	Internazionale	3–1	Torino	Milan
21:45 CEST (UTC+02:00)	Godín (yellow card) 21', (goal) 51'; Young 49'; Brozović (yellow card) 60'; Martínez 61'; Sánchez (yellow card) 62'; D'Ambrosio (yellow card) 69'; Biraghi (yellow card) 86'	Report	Belotti 17'; Aina (yellow card) 24'; Meïté (yellow card) 30'; De Silvestri (yellow card) 49'	Stadium: San Siro; Attendance: 0 Referee: Davide Massa

16 July 2020 33	SPAL	0–4	Internazionale	Ferrara
21:45 CEST (UTC+02:00)	Valdifiori (yellow card) 46'; Murgia (yellow card) 51'	Report	Bastoni (yellow card) 32'; Candreva 37'; Biraghi (yellow card) 54', (goal) 55'; Sánchez 60'; Ranocchia (yellow card) 62'; Gagliardini 74'	Stadium: Stadio Paolo Mazza; Attendance: 0 Referee: Antonio Giua

19 July 2020 34	Roma	2–2	Internazionale	Rome
21:45 CEST (UTC+02:00)	Spinazzola 45+1'; Mkhitaryan 57'; López (yellow card) 72'	Report	De Vrij 15'; Barella (yellow card) 23'; Lukaku 87' (pen.)	Stadium: Stadio Olimpico; Attendance: 0 Referee: Marco Di Bello

22 July 2020 35	Internazionale	0–0	Fiorentina	Milan
21:45 CEST (UTC+02:00)	Barella (yellow card) 76'	Report	Ribéry (yellow card) 43'; Castrovilli (yellow card) 57'; Cáceres (yellow card) 79'	Stadium: San Siro; Attendance: 0 Referee: Piero Giacomelli

25 July 2020 36	Genoa	0–3	Internazionale	Genoa
19:30 CEST (UTC+02:00)	Criscito (yellow card) 16'; Romero (yellow card) 45+1'	Report	Lukaku 34', 90+3'; Gagliardini (yellow card) 42'; Ranocchia (yellow card) 74'; Sánchez 83'; Handanović (yellow card) 86'	Stadium: Luigi Ferraris; Attendance: 0 Referee: Davide Massa

28 July 2020 37	Internazionale	2–0	Napoli	Milan
21:45 CEST (UTC+02:00)	D'Ambrosio 11'; Sánchez (yellow card) 22'; Brozović (yellow card) 45+4'; Barella (yellow card) 55'; Martínez 74'; Biraghi (yellow card) 77'	Report	Lozano (yellow card) 80'	Stadium: San Siro; Attendance: 0 Referee: Paolo Valeri

1 August 2020 38	Atalanta	0–2	Internazionale	Bergamo
20:45 CEST (UTC+02:00)	Djimsiti (yellow card) 25'; Toloi (yellow card) 44'	Report	D'Ambrosio 1'; Young 20'; De Vrij (yellow card) 23'; Brozović (yellow card) 56'; Handanović (yellow card) 86'	Stadium: Stadio Atleti Azzurri d'Italia; Attendance: 0 Referee: Piero Giacomelli

=== Coppa Italia ===
14 January 2020 Round of 16	Internazionale	4–1	Cagliari	Milan
20:45 CET (UTC+01:00)	Lukaku 1', 49'; Valero 22'; Godín (yellow card) 65'; Ranocchia 81'; Sensi (yellow card) 90+4'	Report	Lykogiannis (yellow card) 46'; Oliva 73'	Stadium: San Siro; Attendance: 28,914; Referee: Daniele Chiffi

29 January 2020 Quarter-finals	Internazionale	2–1	Fiorentina	Milan
20:45 CET (UTC+01:00)	Candreva 44'; Barella 67'	Report	Cáceres (yellow card) 45', (goal) 60'; Dalbert (yellow card) 65'; Sottil (yellow card) 90'	Stadium: San Siro; Attendance: 51,431; Referee: Daniele Doveri

12 February 2020 Semi-finals; First leg	Internazionale	0–1	Napoli	Milan
20:45 CET (UTC+01:00)	Škriniar (yellow card) 3'	Report	Manolas (yellow card) 51'; Fabián 57'; Mário Rui (yellow card) 77'; Ospina (yellow card) 85'	Stadium: San Siro; Attendance: 59,601; Referee: Gianpaolo Calvarese

13 June 2020 Semi-finals; Second leg	Napoli	1–1 (2–1 agg.)	Internazionale	Naples
21:00 CEST (UTC+02:00)	Mertens 41'; Ospina (yellow card) 79'	Report	Eriksen 2'; Young (yellow card) 12'; De Vrij (yellow card) 38'	Stadium: Stadio San Paolo; Attendance: 0 Referee: Gianluca Rocchi
Note: Match was postponed to 13 June from its original date of 5 March due to concerns over the COVID-19 pandemic.

=== UEFA Champions League ===
==== Group stage ====
Pos	Team	Pld	W	D	L	GF	GA	GD	Pts	Qualification	BAR	DOR	INT	SLP
1	(Spain) Barcelona	6	4	2	0	9	4	+5	14	Advance to knockout phase	—	3–1	2–1	0–0
2	(Germany) Borussia Dortmund	6	3	1	2	8	8	0	10	Advance to knockout phase	0–0	—	3–2	2–1
3	(Italy) Inter Milan	6	2	1	3	10	9	+1	7	Transfer to Europa League	1–2	2–0	—	1–1
4	(Czech Republic) Slavia Prague	6	0	2	4	4	10	−6	2		1–2	0–2	1–3	—

Source: UEFA
Rules for classification: Group stage tiebreakers

17 September 2019 1	Internazionale (Italy)	1–1	(Czech Republic) Slavia Prague	Milan, Italy
18:55 CEST (UTC+02:00)	Asamoah (yellow card) 54'; Martínez (yellow card) 66'; Politano (yellow card) 83'; Barella 90+2'	Report	Hovorka (yellow card) 40'; Olayinka 63'; Souček (yellow card) 90+1'	Stadium: San Siro; Attendance: 50,128; Referee: Ruddy Buquet (France)

2 October 2019 2	Barcelona (Spain)	2–1	(Italy) Internazionale	Barcelona, Spain
21:00 CEST (UTC+02:00)	Griezmann (yellow card) 9'; Piqué (yellow card) 22'; Roberto (yellow card) 52'; Suárez 58', 84'; Vidal (yellow card) 76'	Report	Martínez 3'; Barella (yellow card) 6'; Sánchez (yellow card) 77'	Stadium: Camp Nou; Attendance: 86,141; Referee: Damir Skomina (Slovenia)

23 October 2019 3	Internazionale (Italy)	2–0	(Germany) Borussia Dortmund	Milan, Italy
21:00 CEST (UTC+02:00)	Martínez 22'; Brozović (yellow card) 44'; Barella (yellow card) 56'; Godín (yellow card) 78'; Candreva 89', (yellow card) 90'	Report	Weigl (yellow card) 79'; Hummels (yellow card) 87'	Stadium: San Siro; Attendance: 65,673; Referee: Anthony Taylor (England)

5 November 2019 4	Borussia Dortmund (Germany)	3–2	(Italy) Internazionale	Dortmund, Germany
21:00 CET (UTC+01:00)	Hakimi 51', 77'; Brandt 64'; Hazard (yellow card) 79'	Report	Biraghi (yellow card) 1'; Martínez 5'; Škriniar (yellow card) 30'; Vecino 40'; Candreva (yellow card) 49'	Stadium: Westfalenstadion; Attendance: 66,099; Referee: Danny Makkelie (Netherlands)

27 November 2019 5	Slavia Prague (Czech Republic)	1–3	(Italy) Internazionale	Prague, Czech Republic
21:00 CET (UTC+01:00)	Souček 37' (pen.); Kúdela (yellow card) 52'	Report	Vecino (yellow card) 12'; Martínez 19', 88', (yellow card) 24'; Lukaku 81'	Stadium: Sinobo Stadium; Attendance: 19,370; Referee: Szymon Marciniak (Poland)

10 December 2019 6	Internazionale (Italy)	1–2	(Spain) Barcelona	Milan, Italy
21:00 CET (UTC+01:00)	Lukaku 44'; Valero (yellow card) 45+1'; De Vrij (yellow card) 88'; Godín (yellow card) 90+2'	Report	Pérez 23'; Lenglet (yellow card) 35'; Junior (yellow card) 49'; Fati 86'	Stadium: San Siro; Attendance: 71,818; Referee: Björn Kuipers (Netherlands)

=== UEFA Europa League ===
==== Knockout phase ====
20 February 2020 Round of 32 First leg	Ludogorets Razgrad (Bulgaria)	0–2	(Italy) Internazionale	Razgrad, Bulgaria
18:55 CET (UTC+01:00)	Grigore (yellow card) 43'; Wanderson (yellow card) 61'; Tchibota (yellow card) 85'; Abel (yellow card) 90+4'	Report	Martínez (yellow card) 22'; Eriksen 71'; Lukaku 90+4' (pen.)	Stadium: Ludogorets Arena; Attendance: 10,024; Referee: Carlos del Cerro Grande (Spain)

27 February 2020 Round of 32 Second leg	Internazionale (Italy)	2–1 (4–1 agg.)	(Bulgaria) Ludogorets Razgrad	Milan, Italy
21:00 CET (UTC+01:00)	D'Ambrosio (yellow card) 22'; Biraghi 32'; Lukaku 45+4'	Report	Cauly 24'; Wanderson (yellow card) 70'	Stadium: San Siro; Attendance: 0 Referee: Daniel Siebert (Germany)
Note: Match was played behind closed doors due to concerns over the COVID-19 pandemic in Europe.

5 August 2020 Round of 16	Internazionale (Italy)	2–0	(Spain) Getafe	Gelsenkirchen, Germany
21:00 CEST (UTC+02:00)	Lukaku 33'; Eriksen 83'	Report	Suárez (yellow card) 90+1'	Stadium: Arena AufSchalke; Attendance: 0 Referee: Anthony Taylor (England)
Note: Match was meant to be played behind closed doors due to concerns over the COVID-19 pandemic. However, on 11 March the match was indefinitely postponed from its original date of 12 March due to a pandemic of COVID-19 in Italy and subsequent travel restrictions. On 17 June, the match was rescheduled to 5 August to be played in a single leg at Arena AufSchalke in Germany, and behind closed doors due to concerns over the COVID-19 pandemic in Europe.

10 August 2020 Quarter-finals	Internazionale (Italy)	2–1	(Germany) Bayer Leverkusen	Düsseldorf, Germany
21:00 CEST (UTC+02:00)	Martinez 15', (yellow card) 90+7'; Lukaku 21'; D'Ambrosio (yellow card) 32'; Eriksen (yellow card) 85'	Report	Havertz 24'; Sinkgraven (yellow card) 43'; L. Bender (yellow card) 48'; Tapsoba (yellow card) 87'	Stadium: Merkur Spiel-Arena; Attendance: 0 Referee: Carlos del Cerro Grande (Spain)
Note: Match was played behind closed doors due to concerns over the COVID-19 pandemic in Europe.

17 August 2020 Semi-finals	Internazionale (Italy)	5–0	(Ukraine) Shakhtar Donetsk	Düsseldorf, Germany
21:00 CEST (UTC+02:00)	Martínez 19', 74'; D'Ambrosio 64'; Lukaku 78', 84'	Report	Taison (yellow card) 58'	Stadium: Merkur Spiel-Arena; Attendance: 0 Referee: Szymon Marciniak (Poland)
Note: Match was played behind closed doors due to concerns over the COVID-19 pandemic in Europe.

21 August 2020 Final	Sevilla (Spain)	3–2	(Italy) Internazionale	Cologne, Germany
21:00 CEST (UTC+02:00)	Diego Carlos (yellow card) 4'; De Jong 12', 39'; Banega (yellow card) 45'; Lukaku 74' (o.g.)	Report	Lukaku 5' (pen.); Godín 33'; Barella (yellow card) 41'; Bastoni (yellow card) 55'; Gagliardini (yellow card) 73'	Stadium: RheinEnergieStadion; Attendance: 0 Referee: Danny Makkelie (Netherlands)
Note: Match was played behind closed doors due to concerns over the COVID-19 pandemic in Europe.

== Statistics ==
=== Appearances and goals ===
No.	Pos	Nat	Player	Total		Serie A		Coppa Italia		Champions League		Europa League	
No.	Pos	Nat	Player	Apps	Goals	Apps	Goals	Apps	Goals	Apps	Goals	Apps	Goals
Goalkeepers
1	GK	(Slovenia) SLO	Samir Handanović	48	0	35	0	3	0	6	0	4	0
27	GK	(Italy) ITA	Daniele Padelli	6	0	3	0	1	0	0	0	2	0
Defenders
2	DF	(Uruguay) URU	Diego Godín	35	2	17+5	1	2	0	5	0	6	1
6	DF	(Netherlands) NED	Stefan de Vrij	45	4	31+2	4	2	0	6	0	4	0
13	DF	(Italy) ITA	Andrea Ranocchia	11	1	5+1	0	2+1	1	0	0	2	0
15	DF	(England) ENG	Ashley Young	24	4	12+5	4	2	0	0	0	4+1	0
18	DF	(Ghana) GHA	Kwadwo Asamoah	11	0	7+1	0	0	0	3	0	0	0
31	DF	(Italy) ITA	Lorenzo Pirola	1	0	0+1	0	0	0	0	0	0	0
33	DF	(Italy) ITA	Danilo D'Ambrosio	31	5	14+7	4	0+1	0	2+1	0	6	1
34	DF	(Italy) ITA	Cristiano Biraghi	37	3	18+8	2	1+2	0	3+1	0	2+2	1
37	DF	(Slovakia) SVK	Milan Škriniar	42	0	30+2	0	3	0	6	0	0+1	0
95	DF	(Italy) ITA	Alessandro Bastoni	32	2	21+3	2	3	0	0	0	4+1	0
Midfielders
5	MF	(Italy) ITA	Roberto Gagliardini	31	4	20+3	4	0	0	2+2	0	4	0
8	MF	(Uruguay) URU	Matías Vecino	25	3	14+6	2	1	0	3	1	1	0
11	MF	(Nigeria) NGR	Victor Moses	19	0	4+7	0	1+2	0	0	0	2+3	0
12	MF	(Italy) ITA	Stefano Sensi	19	3	9+3	3	1+2	0	2+1	0	0+1	0
20	MF	(Spain) ESP	Borja Valero	25	3	9+10	2	1	1	2+1	0	2	0
23	MF	(Italy) ITA	Nicolò Barella	40	4	22+4	1	4	1	3+1	1	5+1	1
24	MF	(Denmark) DEN	Christian Eriksen	25	4	7+9	1	1+2	1	0	0	2+4	2
32	MF	(France) FRA	Lucien Agoumé	3	0	0+3	0	0	0	0	0	0	0
77	MF	(Croatia) CRO	Marcelo Brozović	45	3	30+1	3	3	0	6	0	4+1	0
87	MF	(Italy) ITA	Antonio Candreva	39	7	23+8	5	2	1	5	1	0+1	0
Forwards
7	FW	(Chile) CHI	Alexis Sánchez	31	4	9+12	4	2+2	0	1	0	2+3	0
9	FW	(Belgium) BEL	Romelu Lukaku	50	34	32+3	23	4	2	5	2	5+1	7
10	FW	(Argentina) ARG	Lautaro Martínez	49	21	29+6	14	3	0	6	5	5	2
30	FW	(Italy) ITA	Sebastiano Esposito	14	1	2+5	1	0+2	0	0+3	0	0+2	0
Players transferred out during the season
16	FW	(Italy) ITA	Matteo Politano	15	0	2+9	0	0	0	0+4	0	0	0
19	MF	(Austria) AUT	Valentino Lazaro	11	0	3+3	0	1	0	0+4	0	0	0
21	DF	(Italy) ITA	Federico Dimarco	4	0	0+3	0	1	0	0	0	0	0

Last updated: 21 August 2020
Source: Competitions

=== Goalscorers ===
Rank	No.	Pos	Nat	Name	Serie A	Coppa Italia	UEFA CL	UEFA EL	Total
1	9	FW	(Belgium)	Romelu Lukaku	23	2	2	7	34
2	10	FW	(Argentina)	Lautaro Martínez	14	0	5	2	21
3	87	MF	(Italy)	Antonio Candreva	5	1	1	0	7
4	33	DF	(Italy)	Danilo D'Ambrosio	4	0	0	1	5
5	5	MF	(Italy)	Roberto Gagliardini	4	0	0	0	4
5	6	DF	(Netherlands)	Stefan de Vrij	4	0	0	0	4
5	7	FW	(Chile)	Alexis Sánchez	4	0	0	0	4
5	15	DF	(England)	Ashley Young	4	0	0	0	4
5	23	MF	(Italy)	Nicolò Barella	1	1	1	1	4
5	24	MF	(Denmark)	Christian Eriksen	1	1	0	2	4
11	8	MF	(Uruguay)	Matías Vecino	2	0	1	0	3
11	12	MF	(Italy)	Stefano Sensi	3	0	0	0	3
11	20	MF	(Spain)	Borja Valero	2	1	0	0	3
11	34	DF	(Italy)	Cristiano Biraghi	2	0	0	1	3
11	77	MF	(Croatia)	Marcelo Brozović	3	0	0	0	3
16	2	DF	(Uruguay)	Diego Godín	1	0	0	1	2
16	95	DF	(Italy)	Alessandro Bastoni	2	0	0	0	2
18	13	DF	(Italy)	Andrea Ranocchia	0	1	0	0	1
18	30	FW	(Italy)	Sebastiano Esposito	1	0	0	0	1
Own goal					1	0	0	0	1
Totals					81	7	10	15	113

Last updated: 21 August 2020

=== Clean sheets ===
Rank	No.	Pos	Nat	Name	Serie A	Coppa Italia	UEFA CL	UEFA EL	Total
1	1	GK	(Slovenia)	Samir Handanović	13	0	1	2	16
2	27	GK	(Italy)	Daniele Padelli	1	0	0	1	2
Totals					14	0	1	3	18

Last updated: 21 August 2020

=== Disciplinary record ===
No.	Pos	Nat	Name	Serie A			Coppa Italia			UEFA CL			UEFA EL			Total		
No.	Pos	Nat	Name	Booked	(yellow card) (yellow-red card)	Sent off (straight red)	Booked	(yellow card) (yellow-red card)	Sent off (straight red)	Booked	(yellow card) (yellow-red card)	Sent off (straight red)	Booked	(yellow card) (yellow-red card)	Sent off (straight red)	Booked	(yellow card) (yellow-red card)	Sent off (straight red)
1	GK	(Slovenia)	Samir Handanović	2	0	0	0	0	0	0	0	0	0	0	0	2	0	0
27	GK	(Italy)	Daniele Padelli	0	0	1	0	0	0	0	0	0	0	0	0	0	0	1
46	GK	(Italy)	Tommaso Berni	0	0	2	0	0	0	0	0	0	0	0	0	0	0	2
2	DF	(Uruguay)	Diego Godín	5	0	0	1	0	0	2	0	0	0	0	0	8	0	0
6	DF	(Netherlands)	Stefan de Vrij	5	0	0	1	0	0	1	0	0	0	0	0	7	0	0
13	DF	(Italy)	Andrea Ranocchia	3	0	0	0	0	0	0	0	0	0	0	0	3	0	0
15	DF	(England)	Ashley Young	1	0	0	1	0	0	0	0	0	0	0	0	2	0	0
18	DF	(Ghana)	Kwadwo Asamoah	1	0	0	0	0	0	1	0	0	0	0	0	2	0	0
33	DF	(Italy)	Danilo D'Ambrosio	6	0	0	0	0	0	0	0	0	2	0	0	8	0	0
34	DF	(Italy)	Cristiano Biraghi	3	0	0	0	0	0	1	0	0	0	0	0	4	0	0
37	DF	(Slovakia)	Milan Škriniar	7	1	0	1	0	0	1	0	0	0	0	0	9	1	0
95	DF	(Italy)	Alessandro Bastoni	7	1	0	0	0	0	0	0	0	1	0	0	8	1	0
5	MF	(Italy)	Roberto Gagliardini	5	0	0	0	0	0	0	0	0	1	0	0	6	0	0
8	MF	(Uruguay)	Matías Vecino	4	0	0	0	0	0	1	0	0	0	0	0	5	0	0
11	MF	(Nigeria)	Victor Moses	1	0	0	0	0	0	0	0	0	0	0	0	1	0	0
12	MF	(Italy)	Stefano Sensi	2	0	0	1	0	0	0	0	0	0	0	0	3	0	0
19	MF	(Austria)	Valentino Lazaro	2	0	0	0	0	0	0	0	0	0	0	0	2	0	0
20	MF	(Spain)	Borja Valero	4	0	0	0	0	0	1	0	0	0	0	0	5	0	0
23	MF	(Italy)	Nicolò Barella	11	0	0	0	0	0	2	0	0	2	0	0	15	0	0
24	MF	(Denmark)	Christian Eriksen	0	0	0	0	0	0	0	0	0	1	0	0	1	0	0
32	MF	(France)	Lucien Agoumé	1	0	0	0	0	0	0	0	0	0	0	0	1	0	0
77	MF	(Croatia)	Marcelo Brozović	9	0	0	0	0	0	1	0	0	0	0	0	10	0	0
87	MF	(Italy)	Antonio Candreva	5	0	0	0	0	0	2	0	0	0	0	0	7	0	0
7	FW	(Chile)	Alexis Sánchez	2	1	0	0	0	0	1	0	0	0	0	0	3	1	0
9	FW	(Belgium)	Romelu Lukaku	2	0	0	0	0	0	0	0	0	0	0	0	2	0	0
10	FW	(Argentina)	Lautaro Martínez	8	0	1	0	0	0	2	0	0	1	0	0	11	0	1
16	FW	(Italy)	Matteo Politano	0	0	0	0	0	0	1	0	0	0	0	0	1	0	0
30	FW	(Italy)	Sebastiano Esposito	2	0	0	0	0	0	0	0	0	0	0	0	2	0	0
Totals				97	3	4	5	0	0	17	0	0	8	0	0	129	3	4

Last updated: 21 August 2020

=== Attendances ===
	Matches	Attendances	Average	High	Low
Serie A	19	789,598	41,557	75,923	0
Coppa Italia	3	139,946	46,648	51,431	28,914
Champions League	3	187,619	62,539	71,818	50,128
Europa League	1	0	0	0	0
Total	26	1,117,163	37,686	75,923	0

Last updated: 28 July 2020
