= 2020–21 Inter Milan season =

Inter Milan
2020–21 season
- Chairman: Steven Zhang
- Head coach: Antonio Conte
- Stadium: San Siro
- Serie A: 1st
- Coppa Italia: Semi-finals
- UEFA Champions League: Group stage
- Top goalscorer: League: Romelu Lukaku (24); All: Romelu Lukaku (30)
Home colours	Away colours	Third colours

The 2020–21 season was the 113th season in the existence of Inter Milan and the club's 105th consecutive season in the top flight of Italian football. In addition to the domestic league, Inter Milan participated in this season's editions of the Coppa Italia and the UEFA Champions League. The season covered the period from 22 August 2020 to 30 June 2021.

Inter were confirmed as league champions on 2 May 2021 with four rounds still to play, after closest challengers Atalanta failed to win their match against Sassuolo. It ended Juventus's nine-year grasp on the Serie A title and was the club's first league championship since 2009–10. In the Coppa Italia, Inter were eliminated by eventual winners Juventus by a 2–1 aggregate score in the semi-final stage. While in the Champions League, Inter were eliminated in the group stage, finishing last in their group, following a poor campaign in which they only managed a single win. It was the third successive occasion in which Inter failed to qualify out of the Champions League group stage.

On 26 May 2021, Inter confirmed that head coach Antonio Conte had left the club by mutual consent. The departure came amid rumors that the club would have to significantly cut salary costs and sell key players due to mounting debt from both the effects of the COVID-19 pandemic in Italy and ambitious spending in the previous seasons.

== Kits ==
Supplier: Nike / Sponsor: Pirelli

Outfield players kits

Home	Home alt.	Away	Third	Special Kit

Goalkeeper kits

Goalkeeper 1	Goalkeeper 2	Goalkeeper 3	Goalkeeper 4

== Players ==
=== Squad information ===
Players and squad numbers last updated on 23 May 2021. Appearances include league matches only.
Note: Flags indicate national team as has been defined under FIFA eligibility rules. Players may hold more than one non-FIFA nationality.

No.	Name	Nat	Position(s)	Date of birth (age)	Signed in	Contract ends	Signed from	Apps.	Goals	Notes
Goalkeepers
1	Samir Handanović	(Slovenia)	GK	14 July 1984 (aged 36)	2012	2022	(Italy) Udinese	329	0	Captain
27	Daniele Padelli ^{HG}	(Italy)	GK	25 October 1985 (aged 35)	2017	2021	(Italy) Torino	4	0	
35	Filip Stanković ^{U21 / CT}	(Serbia)	GK	25 February 2002 (aged 19)	2019	2024	(Italy) Youth Sector	0	0	
97	Ionuț Radu ^{CT}	(Romania)	GK	28 May 1997 (aged 24)	2019	2024	(Italy) Genoa	3	0	
Defenders
6	Stefan de Vrij	(Netherlands)	CB	5 February 1992 (aged 29)	2018	2023	(Italy) Lazio	94	7	
11	Aleksandar Kolarov	(Serbia)	LB / CB	10 November 1985 (aged 35)	2020	2021	(Italy) Roma	7	0	
13	Andrea Ranocchia ^{HG}	(Italy)	CB	16 February 1988 (aged 33)	2011	2021	(Italy) Genoa	164	9	Vice-captain
33	Danilo D'Ambrosio ^{HG}	(Italy)	RB / LB / CB	9 September 1988 (aged 32)	2014	2021	(Italy) Torino	191	16	
36	Matteo Darmian ^{HG}	(Italy)	RB / LB / CB	2 December 1989 (aged 31)	2020	2021	(Italy) Parma	26	3	On loan
37	Milan Škriniar	(Slovakia)	CB	11 February 1995 (aged 26)	2017	2023	(Italy) Sampdoria	137	7	
95	Alessandro Bastoni ^{U21}	(Italy)	CB	13 April 1999 (aged 22)	2017	2023	(Italy) Atalanta	58	2	
Midfielders
2	Achraf Hakimi	(Morocco)	RWB / RM	4 November 1998 (aged 22)	2020	2025	(Spain) Real Madrid	37	7	
5	Roberto Gagliardini ^{HG}	(Italy)	CM / DM	8 April 1994 (aged 27)	2017	2023	(Italy) Atalanta	119	14	
8	Matías Vecino	(Uruguay)	CM / DM	24 August 1991 (aged 29)	2017	2022	(Italy) Fiorentina	87	9	
12	Stefano Sensi ^{HG}	(Italy)	CM / AM	5 August 1995 (aged 25)	2020	2024	(Italy) Sassuolo	30	3	
14	Ivan Perišić	(Croatia)	LW / LWB / SS	2 February 1989 (aged 32)	2015	2022	(Germany) VfL Wolfsburg	173	41	
15	Ashley Young	(England)	LWB / RWB / LM / RM	9 July 1985 (aged 35)	2020	2021	(England) Manchester United	44	5	
22	Arturo Vidal	(Chile)	CM	22 May 1987 (aged 34)	2020	2022	(Spain) Barcelona	23	1	
23	Nicolò Barella ^{HG}	(Italy)	CM	7 February 1997 (aged 24)	2020	2024	(Italy) Cagliari	63	4	
24	Christian Eriksen	(Denmark)	AM / CM	14 February 1992 (aged 29)	2020	2024	(England) Tottenham Hotspur	43	4	
77	Marcelo Brozović	(Croatia)	DM / CM	16 November 1992 (aged 28)	2015	2022	(Croatia) Dinamo Zagreb	198	20	
Forwards
7	Alexis Sánchez	(Chile)	SS / ST / LW / RW	19 December 1988 (aged 32)	2020	2023	(England) Manchester United	52	11	
9	Romelu Lukaku	(Belgium)	ST	13 May 1993 (aged 28)	2019	2024	(England) Manchester United	72	47	
10	Lautaro Martínez	(Argentina)	ST	22 August 1997 (aged 23)	2018	2023	(Argentina) Racing	100	37	
99	Andrea Pinamonti ^{U21 / CT}	(Italy)	ST	19 May 1999 (aged 22)	2020	2024	(Italy) Genoa	11	1	
Players transferred during the season
44	Radja Nainggolan ^{HG}	(Belgium)	CM / AM	4 May 1988 (aged 32)	2018	2022	(Italy) Roma	33	6	Out on loan

- Note: Serie A imposes a cap on the first team squad at 25 players, with additional requirements on homegrown players (marked as ^{HG}) and club-trained players (marked as ^{CT}). However, league rules allow for unlimited club-trained players that are under-21 (marked as ^{U21}).

== Transfers ==
=== In ===
==== Transfers ====
Date	Pos.	Player	Age	Moving from	Fee	Notes	Source
Summer
5 June 2020	DF	(Greece) Georgios Vagiannidis	18	(Greece) Panathinaikos	€0.4m		
2 July 2020	DF	(Morocco) Achraf Hakimi	21	(Spain) Real Madrid	€40m		
6 August 2020	FW	(Chile) Alexis Sánchez	31	(England) Manchester United	Free	(Note: Previously on loan, Sánchez made the permanent switch to Inter Milan on a free transfer.)	
1 September 2020	MF	(Italy) Nicolò Barella	23	(Italy) Cagliari	€25m	(Note: Bought on loan obligation. The total cost of the operation, including the initial loan fee and the additional bonuses, amounts to €40.5m.)	
1 September 2020	MF	(Italy) Stefano Sensi	25	(Italy) Sassuolo	€20m	(Note: Option to buy exercised.)	
8 September 2020	DF	(Serbia) Aleksandar Kolarov	34	(Italy) Roma	€1.5m	(Note: €0.5m of possible additional bonuses linked to the achievement of certain objectives.)	
16 September 2020	FW	(Switzerland) Darian Males	19	(Switzerland) Luzern	€4m		
18 September 2020	FW	(Italy) Andrea Pinamonti	21	(Italy) Genoa	€8m	(Note: Buy-back clause activated. Inter is also expected to pay €12m of additional bonuses linked to the achievement of certain objectives.)	
22 September 2020	MF	(Chile) Arturo Vidal	33	(Spain) Barcelona	Free	(Note: Inter was expected to pay Barcelona €1m in bonuses.)	

==== On loan ====
Date	Pos.	Player	Age	Moving from	Fee	Notes	Source
Summer
5 October 2020	DF	(Italy) Matteo Darmian	30	(Italy) Parma	N/A	(Note: Loan with obligation to buy for €2.5m.)	

==== Loan returns ====
Date	Pos.	Player	Age	Moving from	Notes	Source
Summer
7 August 2020	MF	(Belgium) Xian Emmers	21	(Belgium) Waasland-Beveren		
13 August 2020	FW	(Italy) Matteo Rover	21	(Italy) Südtirol		
19 August 2020	MF	(Austria) Valentino Lazaro	24	(England) Newcastle United		
26 August 2020	GK	(Italy) Michele Di Gregorio	23	(Italy) Pordenone		
27 August 2020	MF	(Italy) Lorenzo Gavioli	20	(Italy) Ravenna		
31 August 2020	GK	(Brazil) Gabriel Brazão	19	(Spain) Albacete		
31 August 2020	GK	(Italy) Nicola Tintori	20	(Italy) Gozzano		
31 August 2020	GK	(Romania) Ionuț Radu	23	(Italy) Parma		
31 August 2020	DF	(Italy) Niccolò Corrado	20	(Italy) Arezzo		
31 August 2020	DF	(Brazil) Dalbert	26	(Italy) Fiorentina		
31 August 2020	DF	(Italy) Federico Dimarco	22	(Italy) Hellas Verona		
31 August 2020	DF	(Italy) Davide Grassini	20	(Italy) Ravenna		
31 August 2020	DF	(Guadeloupe) Andreaw Gravillon	22	(Italy) Sassuolo		
31 August 2020	DF	(Italy) Davide Zugaro	20	(Italy) Olbia		
31 August 2020	MF	(Slovenia) Elian Demirović	20	(Italy) Chievo		
31 August 2020	MF	(Portugal) João Mário	27	(Russia) Lokomotiv Moscow		
31 August 2020	MF	(Belgium) Radja Nainggolan	32	(Italy) Cagliari		
31 August 2020	MF	(Italy) Andrea Palazzi	24	(Italy) Monza		
31 August 2020	MF	(Slovenia) Maj Rorič	20	(Slovakia) Sereď		
31 August 2020	MF	(Italy) Lorenzo Tassi	25	(Italy) Arezzo		
31 August 2020	FW	(Italy) Felice D'Amico	20	(Italy) Sampdoria		
31 August 2020	FW	(France) Yann Karamoh	22	(Italy) Parma		
31 August 2020	FW	(Italy) Samuele Longo	28	(Italy) Venezia		
31 August 2020	FW	(Croatia) Ivan Perišić	31	(Germany) Bayern Munich		
31 August 2020	FW	(Italy) Andrea Pinamonti	21	(Italy) Genoa		
31 August 2020	FW	(Italy) Eddie Salcedo	18	(Italy) Hellas Verona		
31 August 2020	FW	(Italy) Vincenzo Tommasone	25	(Italy) Carpi		
4 October 2020	MF	(Italy) Marco Pompetti	20	(Italy) Pisa		
Winter
31 December 2020	FW	(Italy) Sebastiano Esposito	18	(Italy) SPAL		

=== Out ===
==== Transfers ====
Date	Pos.	Player	Age	Moving to	Fee	Notes	Source
Summer
31 May 2020	FW	(Argentina) Mauro Icardi	27	(France) Paris Saint-Germain	€50m	(Note: Option to buy exercised. Paris Saint-Germain is also expected to pay €8m of additional bonuses linked to the achievement of certain objectives.)	
14 August 2020	FW	(Italy) Matteo Rover	21	(Italy) Südtirol	Undisclosed	(Note: Option to buy exercised.)	
1 September 2020	GK	(Italy) Tommaso Berni	37	Free agent	N/A	(Note: End of contract.)	
1 September 2020	MF	(Italy) Andrea Palazzi	24	(Italy) Monza	€2m	(Note: Monza's promotion to Serie B activated the obligation to buy clause.)	
1 September 2020	MF	(Italy) Lorenzo Tassi	25	Free agent	N/A	(Note: End of contract. On 14 January 2021, Tassi joined Vis Pesaro as a free agent.)	
1 September 2020	MF	(Spain) Borja Valero	35	(Italy) Fiorentina	Free	(Note: End of contract. On 16 September 2020, Valero joined Fiorentina as a free agent.)	
1 September 2020	FW	(Italy) Felice D'Amico	20	(Italy) Sampdoria	€0.4m	(Note: Sold on loan obligation.)	
1 September 2020	FW	(France) Yann Karamoh	22	(Italy) Parma	€8m		
1 September 2020	FW	(Italy) Andrea Pinamonti	21	(Italy) Genoa	€18m		
1 September 2020	FW	(Italy) Vincenzo Tommasone	25	Free agent	N/A	(Note: End of contract. On 25 October 2020, Tommasone joined FC Matese as a free agent.)	
14 September 2020	DF	(Italy) Davide Grassini	20	(Italy) Carrarese	Undisclosed		
18 September 2020	MF	(Slovenia) Elian Demirović	20	(Italy) Fermana	Undisclosed		
24 September 2020	GK	(Italy) Nicola Tintori	20	(Italy) Pro Vercelli	Undisclosed		
24 September 2020	DF	(Uruguay) Diego Godín	34	(Italy) Cagliari	Free		
30 September 2020	MF	(Slovenia) Maj Rorič	20	(Slovenia) Celje	Undisclosed		
5 October 2020	FW	(Italy) Samuele Longo	28	(Italy) Vicenza	€0.4m		
5 October 2020	MF	(Ghana) Kwadwo Asamoah	31	Free agent	N/A	(Note: Termination by mutual consent. On 3 February 2021, Asamoah joined Cagliari as a free agent.)	
Winter
11 January 2021	FW	(France) Axel Mohamed Bakayoko	22	(Serbia) Red Star Belgrade	Free		

==== Loans out ====
Date	Pos.	Player	Age	Moving to	Fee	Notes	Source
Summer
8 August 2020	MF	(Belgium) Xian Emmers	21	(Netherlands) Almere City	N/A		
20 August 2020	MF	(Austria) Valentino Lazaro	24	(Germany) Borussia Mönchengladbach	€1.2m	(Note: Loan with option to buy set at €13.8m. In case of a future sale Inter would receive 15% of the earnings.)	
27 August 2020	GK	(Italy) Michele Di Gregorio	23	(Italy) Monza	N/A	(Note: Loan with option to buy. Inter would retain a buy-back option.)	
28 August 2020	MF	(Italy) Lorenzo Gavioli	20	(Italy) Feralpisalò	N/A		
31 August 2020	GK	(Brazil) Gabriel Brazão	19	(Spain) Oviedo	N/A		
3 September 2020	DF	(Italy) Niccolò Corrado	20	(Italy) Palermo	N/A		
9 September 2020	DF	(Italy) Federico Dimarco	22	(Italy) Hellas Verona	N/A	(Note: Loan with option to buy.)	
14 September 2020	MF	(Italy) Thomas Schirò	20	(Italy) Carrarese	N/A		
15 September 2020	GK	(Italy) Giacomo Pozzer	19	(Italy) Monopoli	N/A		
16 September 2020	DF	(Italy) Jacopo Gianelli	19	(Italy) Pro Sesto	N/A		
16 September 2020	MF	(Italy) Michael Ntube	19	(Italy) Pro Sesto	N/A		
17 September 2020	FW	(Italy) Edoardo Vergani	19	(Italy) Bologna	N/A		
23 September 2020	DF	(Italy) Davide Zugaro	20	(Italy) Giana Erminio	N/A		
24 September 2020	MF	(France) Lucien Agoumé	18	(Italy) Spezia	N/A		
25 September 2020	FW	(Switzerland) Darian Males	19	(Italy) Genoa	N/A		
25 September 2020	FW	(Italy) Sebastiano Esposito	18	(Italy) SPAL	N/A		
25 September 2020	MF	(Italy) Antonio Candreva	33	(Italy) Sampdoria	N/A	(Note: Loan with obligation to buy for €2.5m)	
25 September 2020	FW	(Italy) Eddie Salcedo	18	(Italy) Hellas Verona	N/A		
25 September 2020	DF	(Guadeloupe) Andreaw Gravillon	22	(France) Lorient	N/A		
26 September 2020	MF	(France) Christopher Attys	19	(Italy) SPAL	N/A		
1 October 2020	DF	(Greece) Georgios Vagiannidis	19	(Belgium) Sint-Truiden	N/A		
3 October 2020	DF	(Brazil) Dalbert	27	(France) Rennes	N/A	(Note: Loan with option to buy set at €12m.)	
5 October 2020	FW	(Italy) Samuele Mulattieri	19	(Netherlands) Volendam	N/A		
5 October 2020	DF	(Italy) Lorenzo Pirola	18	(Italy) Monza	N/A		
5 October 2020	MF	(Italy) Marco Pompetti	20	(Italy) Cavese	N/A		
6 October 2020	MF	(Portugal) João Mário	27	(Portugal) Sporting CP	N/A		
Winter
1 January 2021	MF	(Belgium) Radja Nainggolan	32	(Italy) Cagliari	N/A		
15 January 2021	FW	(Italy) Sebastiano Esposito	18	(Italy) Venezia	N/A		

==== Loans ended ====
Date	Pos.	Player	Age	Moving to	Notes	Source
Summer
5 August 2020	FW	(Chile) Alexis Sánchez	31	(England) Manchester United		
31 August 2020	DF	(Italy) Cristiano Biraghi	27	(Italy) Fiorentina		
31 August 2020	MF	(Italy) Nicolò Barella	23	(Italy) Cagliari		
31 August 2020	MF	(Nigeria) Victor Moses	29	(England) Chelsea		
31 August 2020	MF	(Italy) Stefano Sensi	25	(Italy) Sassuolo		

== Pre-season and friendlies ==
Win Draw Loss

15 September 2020 Friendly	Internazionale	5–0	Lugano	Appiano Gentile
17:00 CEST (UTC+2)	Dalbert 4'; Kecskés 36' (o.g.); Martínez 36', 43'; Lukaku 47' (pen.)	Report		Stadium: Centro Sportivo Suning; Attendance: 0 Referee: Abdoulaye Diop

18 September 2020 Friendly	Internazionale	7–0	Carrarese	Appiano Gentile
17:00 CEST (UTC+2)	Lukaku; Sánchez; Young; Martínez; Salcedo	Report		Stadium: Centro Sportivo Suning; Attendance: 0

19 September 2020 Friendly	Internazionale	7–0	Pisa	Milan
18:00 CEST (UTC+2)	Lukaku 5'; Gagliardini 11'; Martínez 15', 35', 37'; Eriksen 20', 74'	Report		Stadium: San Siro; Attendance: 0 Referee: Kevin Bonacina

13 November 2020 Friendly	Internazionale	1–0	Monza	Appiano Gentile
15:00 CET (UTC+1)	Carboni 64'	Report		Stadium: Centro Sportivo Suning; Attendance: 0

20 January 2021 Friendly	Internazionale	4–0	Pro Sesto	Appiano Gentile
15:00 CET (UTC+1)	Persyn; Perišić; Eriksen	Report		Stadium: Centro Sportivo Suning; Attendance: 0

18 February 2021 Friendly	Internazionale	14–0	Vis Nova Giussano	Appiano Gentile
15:00 CET (UTC+1)	Sánchez; Gagliardini; Pinamonti; Vecino; Darmian; Akhalaia; Bonfanti	Report		Stadium: Centro Sportivo Suning; Attendance: 0

== Competitions ==
=== Overview ===
Competition	First match	Last match	Starting round	Final position	Record							
Competition	First match	Last match	Starting round	Final position	Pld	W	D	L	GF	GA	GD	Win %
Serie A	26 September 2020	23 May 2021	Matchday 1	Winners	38	28	7	3	89	35	+54	73.68
Coppa Italia	13 January 2021	9 February 2021	Round of 16	Semi-finals	4	2	1	1	5	4	+1	50.00
UEFA Champions League	21 October 2020	9 December 2020	Group stage	Group stage	6	1	3	2	7	9	−2	16.67
Total					48	31	11	6	101	48	+53	64.58

Source: Soccerway

=== Serie A ===
==== League table ====
Pos	Team	Pld	W	D	L	GF	GA	GD	Pts	Qualification or relegation
1	Inter Milan (C)	38	28	7	3	89	35	+54	91	Qualification for Champions League group stage
2	Milan	38	24	7	7	74	41	+33	79	Qualification for Champions League group stage
3	Atalanta	38	23	9	6	90	47	+43	78 (Note: Atalanta finished ahead of Juventus on head-to-head points: Juventus 1–1 Atalanta, Atalanta 1–0 Juventus.)	Qualification for Champions League group stage
4	Juventus	38	23	9	6	77	38	+39	78	Qualification for Champions League group stage
5	Napoli	38	24	5	9	86	41	+45	77	Qualification for Europa League group stage (Note: Since the winners of the 2020–21 Coppa Italia, Juventus, qualified for the Champions League, the Europa League berth awarded to the Coppa Italia winners was passed to the sixth-placed team, and the Europa Conference League berth awarded to the sixth-placed team was passed to the seventh-placed team.)

Source: Serie A, Soccerway
Rules for classification: 1) Points; 2) Head-to-head points; 3) Head-to-head goal difference; 4) Goal difference; 5) Goals scored; 6) Draw. (Note: Head-to-head record is used only after all the matches between the teams in question have been played)
(C) Champions

==== Results summary ====
Overall								Home						Away					
Pld	W	D	L	GF	GA	GD	Pts	W	D	L	GF	GA	GD	W	D	L	GF	GA	GD
38	28	7	3	89	35	+54	91	17	1	1	53	18	+35	11	6	2	36	17	+19

Source: Serie A

==== Results by round ====
Round	1	2	3	4	5	6	7	8	9	10	11	12	13	14	15	16	17	18	19	20	21	22	23	24	25	26	27	28	29	30	31	32	33	34	35	36	37	38
Ground	A	H	A	H	A	H	A	H	A	H	A	H	H	A	H	A	A	H	A	H	A	H	A	H	A	H	A	H	A	H	A	A	H	A	H	H	A	H
Result	W	W	D	L	W	D	D	W	W	W	W	W	W	W	W	L	D	W	D	W	W	W	W	W	W	W	W	W	W	W	D	D	W	W	W	W	L	W
Position	11	3	4	6	4	6	7	5	2	2	2	2	2	2	2	2	2	2	2	2	2	1	1	1	1	1	1	1	1	1	1	1	1	1	1	1	1	1

Source: Serie A
A = Away; H = Home; W = Win; D = Draw; L = Loss

==== Matches ====
The league fixtures were announced on 2 September 2020.

26 September 2020 2	Internazionale	4–3	Fiorentina	Milan
20:45 CEST (UTC+2)	Barella (yellow card) 7'; Martínez 45+2'; Ceccherini 52' (o.g.); Lukaku 88'; D'Ambrosio 89'	Report	Kouamé 3'; Ceccherini (yellow card) 32'; Castrovilli 57'; Chiesa 63'	Stadium: San Siro; Attendance: 1,000; Referee: Gianpaolo Calvarese

30 September 2020 1	Benevento	2–5	Internazionale	Benevento
18:00 CEST (UTC+2)	Caprari 34', 76'; Schiattarella (yellow card) 73'	Report	Lukaku 1', 28'; Gagliardini 25'; Hakimi 42'; Martínez 71'	Stadium: Stadio Ciro Vigorito; Attendance: 1,000; Referee: Marco Piccinini
Note: The match was originally scheduled for 20 September 2020, but was postponed due to Inter's involvement in the knockout phase of the UEFA Europa League.

4 October 2020 3	Lazio	1–1	Internazionale	Rome
15:00 CEST (UTC+2)	Farès (yellow card) 37'; Milinković-Savić 55'; Immobile (red card) 70'; Lazzari (yellow card) 79'; Patric (yellow card) 87'	Report	Martínez 30'; Lukaku (yellow card) 42'; Vidal (yellow card) 70'; Young (yellow card) 78'; Sensi (red card) 87'; Barella (yellow card) 90+3'	Stadium: Stadio Olimpico; Attendance: 1,000; Referee: Marco Guida

17 October 2020 4	Internazionale	1–2	Milan	Milan
18:00 CEST (UTC+2)	Lukaku 29'; Brozović (yellow card) 64'; Vidal (yellow card) 69'; Hakimi (yellow card) 83'	Report	Ibrahimović (penalty missed) 13', 13', 16', (yellow card) 60'; Kjær (yellow card) 22'; Kessié (yellow card) 45+1'	Stadium: San Siro; Attendance: 1,000; Referee: Maurizio Mariani

24 October 2020 5	Genoa	0–2	Internazionale	Genoa
18:00 CEST (UTC+2)	Bani (yellow card) 86'	Report	Martínez (yellow card) 40'; Lukaku 64'; D'Ambrosio 79'	Stadium: Stadio Luigi Ferraris; Attendance: 1,000; Referee: Davide Massa

31 October 2020 6	Internazionale	2–2	Parma	Milan
18:00 CET (UTC+1)	Brozović 64'; Ranocchia (yellow card) 67'; Perišić 90+2'	Report	Hernani (yellow card) 23'; Gervinho 46', 62'	Stadium: San Siro; Attendance: 0 Referee: Marco Piccinini

8 November 2020 7	Atalanta	1–1	Internazionale	Bergamo
15:00 CET (UTC+1)	Djimsiti (yellow card) 33'; Miranchuk 79'	Report	Martínez (yellow card) 30', (goal) 59'; De Vrij (yellow card) 44'; Vidal (yellow card) 70'	Stadium: Gewiss Stadium; Attendance: 0 Referee: Daniele Doveri

22 November 2020 8	Internazionale	4–2	Torino	Milan
15:00 CET (UTC+1)	D'Ambrosio (yellow card) 35'; Bastoni (yellow card) 46'; Young (yellow card) 61'; Sánchez 64'; Lukaku 67', 84' (pen.); Martínez 90'	Report	Verdi (yellow card) 31'; Zaza 45+2'; Ansaldi 62' (pen.); Singo (yellow card) 70'	Stadium: San Siro; Attendance: 0 Referee: Federico La Penna

28 November 2020 9	Sassuolo	0–3	Internazionale	Reggio Emilia
15:00 CET (UTC+1)	Locatelli (yellow card) 49'; Rogério (yellow card) 57'; Lopez (yellow card) 66'	Report	Sánchez 4'; Chiricheș 14' (o.g.); Gagliardini 60'; Perišić (yellow card) 80'	Stadium: Mapei Stadium; Attendance: 0 Referee: Massimiliano Irrati

5 December 2020 10	Internazionale	3–1	Bologna	Milan
20:45 CET (UTC+1)	Lukaku 16'; Hakimi 45', 70', (yellow card) 66'	Report	Hickey (yellow card) 54'; Vignato 67'; Danilo (yellow card) 74'	Stadium: San Siro; Attendance: 0 Referee: Paolo Valeri

13 December 2020 11	Cagliari	1–3	Internazionale	Cagliari
12:30 CET (UTC+1)	Faragò (yellow card) 10'; Sottil 42'; Pavoletti (yellow card) 71'	Report	Darmian (yellow card) 16'; Barella 77'; D'Ambrosio 84'; Lukaku 90+4'	Stadium: Sardegna Arena; Attendance: 0 Referee: Fabrizio Pasqua

16 December 2020 12	Internazionale	1–0	Napoli	Milan
20:45 CET (UTC+1)	Brozović (yellow card) 57'; Lukaku 71' (pen.), (yellow card) 80'; Škriniar (yellow card) 85'; D'Ambrosio (yellow card) 88'; Handanović (yellow card) 90+1'	Report	Bakayoko (yellow card) 59'; Ospina (yellow card) 71'; Insigne (red card) 72'; Lozano (yellow card) 74'	Stadium: San Siro; Attendance: 0 Referee: Davide Massa

20 December 2020 13	Internazionale	2–1	Spezia	Milan
15:00 CET (UTC+1)	Brozović (yellow card) 18'; Hakimi 52'; Lukaku 71' (pen.)	Report	Nzola (yellow card) 41'; Terzi (yellow card) 42'; Piccoli 90+4'	Stadium: San Siro; Attendance: 0 Referee: Michael Fabbri

23 December 2020 14	Hellas Verona	1–2	Internazionale	Verona
18:30 CET (UTC+1)	Dawidowicz (yellow card) 29'; Zaccagni (yellow card) 45+3'; Ilić 63'; Dimarco (yellow card) 64'; Magnani (yellow card) 79'	Report	Brozović (yellow card) 45+1'; Martínez 52'; Škriniar 69'; Bastoni (yellow card) 83'	Stadium: Stadio Marcantonio Bentegodi; Attendance: 0 Referee: Piero Giacomelli

3 January 2021 15	Internazionale	6–2	Crotone	Milan
12:30 CET (UTC+1)	Martínez 20', 57', 78'; Marrone 31' (o.g.); Lukaku 64'; Hakimi 87'	Report	Reca (yellow card) 8'; Zanellato 12'; Golemić (yellow card) 22', (goal) 36' (pen.); Luperto (yellow card) 52'	Stadium: San Siro; Attendance: 0 Referee: Gianluca Aureliano

6 January 2021 16	Sampdoria	2–1	Internazionale	Genoa
15:00 CET (UTC+1)	Candreva 23' (pen.); Keita 38', (yellow card) 84'; Thorsby (yellow card) 57'; Askildsen (yellow card) 85'	Report	Sánchez (penalty missed) 12'; Martínez (yellow card) 16'; Barella (yellow card) 23'; De Vrij (yellow card) 40', (goal) 65'; Hakimi (yellow card) 90+1'	Stadium: Stadio Luigi Ferraris; Attendance: 0 Referee: Paolo Valeri

10 January 2021 17	Roma	2–2	Internazionale	Rome
12:30 CET (UTC+1)	Pellegrini 17'; Smalling (yellow card) 45+1'; Mancini (yellow card) 65', (goal) 86'; Villar (yellow card) 76'	Report	Lukaku (yellow card) 43'; Škriniar 56'; Hakimi 63'; Bastoni (yellow card) 67'; Perišić (yellow card) 90+5'	Stadium: Stadio Olimpico; Attendance: 0 Referee: Marco Di Bello

17 January 2021 18	Internazionale	2–0	Juventus	Milan
20:45 CET (UTC+1)	Vidal 12'; Barella 52', (yellow card) 67'; Young (yellow card) 60'	Report	Bonucci (yellow card) 36'; Morata (yellow card) 62'	Stadium: San Siro; Attendance: 0 Referee: Daniele Doveri

23 January 2021 19	Udinese	0–0	Internazionale	Udine
18:00 CET (UTC+1)	Arslan (yellow card) 10'; Samir (yellow card) 37'; Zeegelaar (yellow card) 78'	Report	Bastoni (yellow card) 66'; Sensi (yellow card) 83'	Stadium: Stadio Friuli; Attendance: 0 Referee: Fabio Maresca

30 January 2021 20	Internazionale	4–0	Benevento	Milan
20:45 CET (UTC+1)	Improta 7' (o.g.); Martínez 57'; Lukaku 67', 78'	Report	Caldirola (yellow card) 28'; Depaoli (yellow card) 32'	Stadium: San Siro; Attendance: 0 Referee: Fabrizio Pasqua

5 February 2021 21	Fiorentina	0–2	Internazionale	Florence
20:45 CET (UTC+1)	Amrabat (yellow card) 60'; Martínez Quarta (yellow card) 75'; Pulgar (yellow card) 81'	Report	Barella 31'; Perišić (yellow card) 42', (goal) 52'	Stadium: Stadio Artemio Franchi; Attendance: 0 Referee: Federico La Penna

14 February 2021 22	Internazionale	3–1	Lazio	Milan
20:45 CET (UTC+1)	Lukaku 22' (pen.), 45', (yellow card) 26'; Hakimi (yellow card) 59'; Martínez 64'	Report	Hoedt (yellow card) 20'; Milinković-Savić 61'	Stadium: San Siro; Attendance: 0 Referee: Michael Fabbri

21 February 2021 23	Milan	0–3	Internazionale	Milan
15:00 CET (UTC+1)	Kjær (yellow card) 12'; Saelemaekers (yellow card) 56'	Report	Martínez 5', 57'; Hakimi (yellow card) 22'; Lukaku 66'	Stadium: San Siro; Attendance: 0 Referee: Daniele Doveri

28 February 2021 24	Internazionale	3–0	Genoa	Milan
15:00 CET (UTC+1)	Lukaku 1'; Darmian 69'; Sánchez 77'	Report	Zapata (yellow card) 19'; Strootman (yellow card) 40'	Stadium: San Siro; Attendance: 0 Referee: Daniele Chiffi

4 March 2021 25	Parma	1–2	Internazionale	Parma
20:45 CET (UTC+1)	Hernani 71'	Report	Sánchez 54', 62'; Darmian (yellow card) 90+3'	Stadium: Stadio Ennio Tardini; Attendance: 0 Referee: Fabrizio Pasqua

8 March 2021 26	Internazionale	1–0	Atalanta	Milan
20:45 CET (UTC+1)	Škriniar 54'	Report	Romero (yellow card) 59'	Stadium: San Siro; Attendance: 0 Referee: Maurizio Mariani

14 March 2021 27	Torino	1–2	Internazionale	Turin
15:00 CET (UTC+1)	Sanabria 70'	Report	Gagliardini (yellow card) 53'; Lukaku 62' (pen.); Martínez 85'	Stadium: Stadio Olimpico Grande Torino; Attendance: 0 Referee: Paolo Valeri

3 April 2021 29	Bologna	0–1	Internazionale	Bologna
20:45 CEST (UTC+2)	Soumaoro (yellow card) 31'; De Silvestri (yellow card) 61'; Vignato (yellow card) 82'; Juwara (yellow card) 85'	Report	Lukaku 32'; Ranocchia (yellow card) 53'; Brozović (yellow card) 86'; Bastoni (yellow card) 86'; Gagliardini (yellow card) 88'	Stadium: Stadio Renato Dall'Ara; Attendance: 0 Referee: Piero Giacomelli

7 April 2021 28	Internazionale	2–1	Sassuolo	Milan
18:45 CEST (UTC+2)	Lukaku 10'; Barella (yellow card) 17'; Young (yellow card) 60'; Martínez 67'	Report	Consigli (yellow card) 7'; Traorè (yellow card) 23', (goal) 85'; Lopez (yellow card) 84'	Stadium: San Siro; Attendance: 0 Referee: Massimiliano Irrati
Note: The match was originally scheduled for 20 March 2021, but was postponed after four Internazionale players tested positive for COVID-19. On 24 March, the match was rescheduled to 7 April 2021.

11 April 2021 30	Internazionale	1–0	Cagliari	Milan
12:30 CEST (UTC+2)	Brozović (yellow card) 52'; Darmian 77'	Report	Nainggolan (yellow card) 90+3'	Stadium: San Siro; Attendance: 0 Referee: Luca Pairetto

18 April 2021 31	Napoli	1–1	Internazionale	Naples
20:45 CEST (UTC+2)	Handanović 36' (o.g.); Koulibaly (yellow card) 38'; Demme (yellow card) 80'; Politano (yellow card) 87'; Mertens (yellow card) 88'; Manolas (yellow card) 90+4'	Report	Eriksen 55'; Darmian (yellow card) 63'; Hakimi (yellow card) 90+5'	Stadium: Stadio San Paolo; Attendance: 0 Referee: Daniele Doveri

21 April 2021 32	Spezia	1–1	Internazionale	La Spezia
20:45 CEST (UTC+2)	Farias 12'; Marchizza (yellow card) 62'; Estévez (yellow card) 89'	Report	Perišić 39'	Stadium: Stadio Alberto Picco; Attendance: 0 Referee: Daniele Chiffi

25 April 2021 33	Internazionale	1–0	Hellas Verona	Milan
15:00 CEST (UTC+2)	Darmian 76'	Report	Ceccherini (yellow card) 28'; Magnani (yellow card) 42'; Barák (yellow card) 68'	Stadium: San Siro; Attendance: 0 Referee: Rosario Abisso

1 May 2021 34	Crotone	0–2	Internazionale	Crotone
18:00 CEST (UTC+2)	Rivière (yellow card) 73'	Report	Brozović (yellow card) 38'; Eriksen 69', (yellow card) 90+1'; Hakimi 90+2'	Stadium: Stadio Ezio Scida; Attendance: 0 Referee: Alessandro Prontera

8 May 2021 35	Internazionale	5–1	Sampdoria	Milan
18:00 CEST (UTC+2)	Gagliardini 4'; Sánchez 26', 36'; Pinamonti 61'; Martínez 70' (pen.)	Report	Tonelli (yellow card) 31'; Keita 35'; Silva (yellow card) 68'	Stadium: San Siro; Attendance: 0 Referee: Giovanni Ayroldi

12 May 2021 36	Internazionale	3–1	Roma	Milan
20:45 CEST (UTC+2)	Brozović 11'; Vecino 20'; Lukaku 90'	Report	Darboe (yellow card) 6'; Santon (yellow card) 28'; Mkhitaryan 31'; Kumbulla (yellow card) 71'; Karsdorp (yellow card) 82'	Stadium: San Siro; Attendance: 0 Referee: Daniele Chiffi

15 May 2021 37	Juventus	3–2	Internazionale	Turin
18:00 CEST (UTC+2)	Kulusevski (yellow card) 13'; Bentancur (yellow card) 20' (yellow-red card) 55'; Ronaldo (penalty missed) 24', 24'; Cuadrado 45+3', 88' (pen.), (yellow card) 90'; Chiellini (yellow card) 86'	Report	Darmian (yellow card) 23'; Lukaku 35' (pen.); Martínez (yellow card) 75'; Bastoni (yellow card) 78'; Chiellini 83' (o.g.); Brozović (yellow card) 88' (yellow-red card) 90+2'	Stadium: Allianz Stadium; Attendance: 0 Referee: Gianpaolo Calvarese

23 May 2021 38	Internazionale	5–1	Udinese	Milan
15:00 CEST (UTC+2)	Young 8'; Martínez (yellow card) 26', (goal) 55' (pen.); Eriksen 44'; Perišić 64'; Lukaku 71'	Report	Pereyra 79' (pen.)	Stadium: San Siro; Attendance: 1,000; Referee: Manuel Volpi

=== Coppa Italia ===
13 January 2021 Round of 16	Fiorentina	1–2 (a.e.t.)	Internazionale	Florence
15:00 CET (UTC+1)	Eysseric (yellow card) 6'; Bonaventura (yellow card) 27'; Kouamé 57', (yellow card) 57'; Igor (yellow card) 80'	Report	Vidal 40' (pen.), (yellow card) 84'; Škriniar (yellow card) 45'; Eriksen (yellow card) 79'; Hakimi (yellow card) 112'; Ranocchia (yellow card) 117'; Lukaku 119', (yellow card) 120+3'; Sánchez (yellow card) 120+1'	Stadium: Stadio Artemio Franchi; Referee: Davide Massa

26 January 2021 Quarter-finals	Internazionale	2–1	Milan	Milan
20:45 CET (UTC+1)	Lukaku (yellow card) 45', (goal) 71' (pen.); Brozović (yellow card) 52'; Eriksen 90+7'; Hakimi (yellow card) 90+10'	Report	Kjær (yellow card) 17'; Ibrahimović 31', (yellow card) 45+1' (yellow-red card) 58'; Rebić (yellow card) 65'; Kessié (yellow card) 90+9'	Stadium: San Siro; Referee: Paolo Valeri

2 February 2021 Semi-finals; First leg	Internazionale	1–2	Juventus	Milan
20:45 CET (UTC+1)	Martínez 9'; Young (yellow card) 25'; Vidal (yellow card) 38'; Sánchez (yellow card) 90+2'	Report	Demiral (yellow card) 14'; Ronaldo 26' (pen.), 35', (yellow card) 45+3'; Alex Sandro (yellow card) 32'; De Ligt (yellow card) 47'; Arthur (yellow card) 86'; Morata (yellow card) 90+4'	Stadium: San Siro; Referee: Gianpaolo Calvarese

9 February 2021 Semi-finals; Second leg	Juventus	0–0 (2–1 agg.)	Internazionale	Turin
20:45 CET (UTC+1)	Alex Sandro (yellow card) 25'	Report	Darmian (yellow card) 13'; Perišić (yellow card) 65'; Brozović (yellow card) 73'	Stadium: Allianz Stadium; Referee: Maurizio Mariani

=== UEFA Champions League ===
==== Group stage ====
The group stage draw was held on 1 October 2020.

Pos	Team	Pld	W	D	L	GF	GA	GD	Pts	Qualification	RMA	BMG	SHK	INT
1	(Spain) Real Madrid	6	3	1	2	11	9	+2	10	Advance to knockout phase	—	2–0	2–3	3–2
2	(Germany) Borussia Mönchengladbach	6	2	2	2	16	9	+7	8 (Note: Head-to-head points: Borussia Mönchengladbach 6, Shakhtar Donetsk 0.)	Advance to knockout phase	2–2	—	4–0	2–3
3	(Ukraine) Shakhtar Donetsk	6	2	2	2	5	12	−7	8	Transfer to Europa League	2–0	0–6	—	0–0
4	(Italy) Inter Milan	6	1	3	2	7	9	−2	6		0–2	2–2	0–0	—

Source: UEFA
Rules for classification: Group stage tiebreakers
Notes:

21 October 2020 1	Internazionale (Italy)	2–2	(Germany) Borussia Mönchengladbach	Milan, Italy
21:00 CEST (UTC+2)	D'Ambrosio (yellow card) 17'; Lukaku 49', 90'; De Vrij (yellow card) 65'; Handanović (yellow card) 82'	Report	Bensebaini 62' (pen.); Kramer (yellow card) 68'; Hofmann 85'	Stadium: San Siro; Attendance: 1,000; Referee: Björn Kuipers (Netherlands)

27 October 2020 2	Shakhtar Donetsk (Ukraine)	0–0	(Italy) Internazionale	Kyiv, Ukraine
18:55 CET (UTC+1)		Report	Bastoni (yellow card) 31'; Vidal (yellow card) 64'	Stadium: NSC Olimpiyskiy Stadium; Attendance: 10,178; Referee: Georgi Kabakov (Bulgaria)

3 November 2020 3	Real Madrid (Spain)	3–2	(Italy) Internazionale	Madrid, Spain
21:00 CET (UTC+1)	Benzema 25'; Ramos 33'; Mendy (yellow card) 48'; Valverde (yellow card) 62'; Rodrygo 80'; Casemiro (yellow card) 85'; Courtois (yellow card) 90+2'	Report	Martínez 35'; Vidal (yellow card) 44'; Brozović (yellow card) 51'; Perišić 68'; Barella (yellow card) 72'	Stadium: Alfredo Di Stéfano (Note: Real Madrid played their home matches at Alfredo Di Stéfano, Madrid, instead of their regular home stadium Santiago Bernabéu, Madrid.); Attendance: 0 (Note: Due to the COVID-19 pandemic in Europe, the match was played behind closed doors.); Referee: Clément Turpin (France)

25 November 2020 4	Internazionale (Italy)	0–2	(Spain) Real Madrid	Milan, Italy
21:00 CET (UTC+1)	Gagliardini (yellow card) 19'; Vidal (yellow card) 33' (yellow-red card) 33'; Sensi (yellow card) 86'	Report	Hazard 7' (pen.); Hakimi 59' (o.g.)	Stadium: San Siro; Attendance: 0 Referee: Anthony Taylor (England)

1 December 2020 5	Borussia Mönchengladbach (Germany)	2–3	(Italy) Internazionale	Mönchengladbach, Germany
21:00 CET (UTC+1)	Stindl (yellow card) 10'; Pléa 45+1', 76', (yellow card) 90+5'; Lainer (yellow card) 75'	Report	Darmian 17'; Martínez (yellow card) 20'; De Vrij (yellow card) 58'; Lukaku 64', 73', (yellow card) 89'; Barella (yellow card) 71'; Young (yellow card) 80'; Gagliardini (yellow card) 90+1'; Bastoni (yellow card) 90+5'	Stadium: Borussia-Park; Attendance: 0 Referee: Danny Makkelie (Netherlands)

9 December 2020 6	Internazionale (Italy)	0–0	(Ukraine) Shakhtar Donetsk	Milan, Italy
21:00 CET (UTC+1)	Gagliardini (yellow card) 30'; Hakimi (yellow card) 39'; Brozović (yellow card) 61'	Report	Vitão (yellow card) 29'; Trubin (yellow card) 90+7'	Stadium: San Siro; Attendance: 0 Referee: Slavko Vinčić (Slovenia)

== Statistics ==
=== Appearances and goals ===
No.	Pos	Nat	Player	Total		Serie A		Coppa Italia		Champions League	
No.	Pos	Nat	Player	Apps	Goals	Apps	Goals	Apps	Goals	Apps	Goals
Goalkeepers
1	GK	(Slovenia) SLO	Samir Handanović	47	0	37	0	4	0	6	0
27	GK	(Italy) ITA	Daniele Padelli	1	0	0+1	0	0	0	0	0
97	GK	(Romania) ROU	Ionuț Radu	2	0	1+1	0	0	0	0	0
Defenders
2	DF	(Morocco) MAR	Achraf Hakimi	45	7	29+8	7	1+2	0	4+1	0
6	DF	(Netherlands) NED	Stefan de Vrij	42	1	30+2	1	3+1	0	6	0
11	DF	(Serbia) SRB	Aleksandar Kolarov	11	0	4+3	0	2+1	0	1	0
13	DF	(Italy) ITA	Andrea Ranocchia	9	0	8	0	1	0	0	0
15	DF	(England) ENG	Ashley Young	34	1	16+10	1	2+1	0	5	0
33	DF	(Italy) ITA	Danilo D'Ambrosio	24	3	7+12	3	0	0	3+2	0
36	DF	(Italy) ITA	Matteo Darmian	33	4	14+12	3	3	0	2+2	1
37	DF	(Slovakia) SVK	Milan Škriniar	39	3	31+1	3	4	0	3	0
95	DF	(Italy) ITA	Alessandro Bastoni	41	0	33	0	2	0	5+1	0
Midfielders
5	MF	(Italy) ITA	Roberto Gagliardini	33	3	14+14	3	1	0	3+1	0
8	MF	(Uruguay) URU	Matías Vecino	8	1	3+5	1	0	0	0	0
12	MF	(Italy) ITA	Stefano Sensi	21	0	4+14	0	0+2	0	0+1	0
14	MF	(Croatia) CRO	Ivan Perišić	42	5	20+12	4	2+2	0	2+4	1
22	MF	(Chile) CHI	Arturo Vidal	30	2	14+9	1	3	1	4	0
23	MF	(Italy) ITA	Nicolò Barella	46	3	32+4	3	3+1	0	6	0
24	MF	(Denmark) DEN	Christian Eriksen	34	4	17+9	3	2+2	1	1+3	0
77	MF	(Croatia) CRO	Marcelo Brozović	42	2	29+4	2	3+1	0	4+1	0
Forwards
7	FW	(Chile) CHI	Alexis Sánchez	38	7	12+18	7	3	0	1+4	0
9	FW	(Belgium) BEL	Romelu Lukaku	44	30	32+4	24	2+1	2	5	4
10	FW	(Argentina) ARG	Lautaro Martínez	48	19	30+8	17	3+1	1	5+1	1
99	FW	(Italy) ITA	Andrea Pinamonti	10	1	1+7	1	0+1	0	0+1	0
Players transferred out during the season
44	MF	(Belgium) BEL	Radja Nainggolan	5	0	0+4	0	0	0	0+1	0

Source: Competitions

=== Goalscorers ===
Rank	No.	Pos.	Player	Serie A	Coppa Italia	Champions League	Total
1	9	FW	(Belgium) Romelu Lukaku	24	2	4	30
2	10	FW	(Argentina) Lautaro Martínez	17	1	1	19
3	2	DF	(Morocco) Achraf Hakimi	7	0	0	7
3	7	FW	(Chile) Alexis Sánchez	7	0	0	7
5	14	MF	(Croatia) Ivan Perišić	4	0	1	5
6	24	MF	(Denmark) Christian Eriksen	3	1	0	4
6	36	DF	(Italy) Matteo Darmian	3	0	1	4
8	5	MF	(Italy) Roberto Gagliardini	3	0	0	3
8	23	MF	(Italy) Nicolò Barella	3	0	0	3
8	33	DF	(Italy) Danilo D'Ambrosio	3	0	0	3
8	37	DF	(Slovakia) Milan Škriniar	3	0	0	3
12	22	MF	(Chile) Arturo Vidal	1	1	0	2
12	77	MF	(Croatia) Marcelo Brozović	2	0	0	2
14	6	DF	(Netherlands) Stefan de Vrij	1	0	0	1
14	8	MF	(Uruguay) Matías Vecino	1	0	0	1
14	15	DF	(England) Ashley Young	1	0	0	1
14	99	FW	(Italy) Andrea Pinamonti	1	0	0	1
Own goals				5	0	0	5
Totals				89	5	7	101

=== Clean sheets ===
Rank	No.	Pos.	Player	Serie A	Coppa Italia	Champions League	Total
1	1	GK	(Slovenia) Samir Handanović	14	1	2	17
Totals				14	1	2	17

=== Disciplinary record ===
No.	Pos.	Player	Serie A			Coppa Italia			Champions League			Total		
No.	Pos.	Player	Yellow card	(yellow card) (yellow-red card)	Red card	Yellow card	(yellow card) (yellow-red card)	Red card	Yellow card	(yellow card) (yellow-red card)	Red card	Yellow card	(yellow card) (yellow-red card)	Red card
1	GK	(Slovenia) Samir Handanović	1	0	0	0	0	0	1	0	0	2	0	0
2	DF	(Morocco) Achraf Hakimi	6	0	0	2	0	0	1	0	0	9	0	0
5	MF	(Italy) Roberto Gagliardini	2	0	0	0	0	0	3	0	0	5	0	0
6	DF	(Netherlands) Stefan de Vrij	2	0	0	0	0	0	2	0	0	4	0	0
7	FW	(Chile) Alexis Sánchez	0	0	0	2	0	0	0	0	0	2	0	0
9	FW	(Belgium) Romelu Lukaku	4	0	0	2	0	0	1	0	0	7	0	0
10	FW	(Argentina) Lautaro Martínez	3	0	0	0	0	0	1	0	0	4	0	0
12	MF	(Italy) Stefano Sensi	1	0	1	0	0	0	1	0	0	2	0	1
13	DF	(Italy) Andrea Ranocchia	2	0	0	1	0	0	0	0	0	3	0	0
14	MF	(Croatia) Ivan Perišić	3	0	0	1	0	0	0	0	0	4	0	0
15	DF	(England) Ashley Young	4	0	0	1	0	0	1	0	0	6	0	0
22	MF	(Chile) Arturo Vidal	3	0	0	2	0	0	2	1	0	6	1	0
23	MF	(Italy) Nicolò Barella	5	0	0	0	0	0	2	0	0	6	0	0
24	MF	(Denmark) Christian Eriksen	1	0	0	1	0	0	0	0	0	2	0	0
33	DF	(Italy) Danilo D'Ambrosio	2	0	0	0	0	0	1	0	0	3	0	0
36	DF	(Italy) Matteo Darmian	3	0	0	1	0	0	0	0	0	4	0	0
37	DF	(Slovakia) Milan Škriniar	1	0	0	1	0	0	0	0	0	2	0	0
77	MF	(Croatia) Marcelo Brozović	7	0	0	2	0	0	2	0	0	11	0	0
95	DF	(Italy) Alessandro Bastoni	5	0	0	0	0	0	2	0	0	7	0	0
Totals			54	0	1	16	0	0	20	1	0	90	1	1

Last updated: 1 May 2021
