= Grassini =

Grassini is a surname. Notable people with the surname include:

- Davide Grassini (born 2000), Italian footballer
- Giulio Grassini (1922–1992), first Italian director of the SISDE
- Giuseppina Grassini (1773–1850), Italian contralto and singing teacher
- Margherita Grassini Sarfatti (1880–1961), Italian journalist and Benito Mussolini's biographer
