= Inter TV =

Italian television channel

- Country: Italy

Programming
- Language: Italian

Ownership
- Owner: Inter

History
- Launched: 20 September 2000; 25 years ago

Links
- Website: www.inter.it/intertv

Inter TV is a subscription-based channel, entirely dedicated to the Italian professional football club Inter. It is headquartered at the training centre of Inter in Appiano Gentile. The channel offers Inter fans exclusive interviews with players and staff, full matches, including replays of all Serie A, Coppa Italia, and Champions League/Europa League games, in addition to vintage matches, footballing news, and other themed programming. It first broadcast on 20 September 2000 as Inter Channel, with the current name being adopted on 28 September 2017.

== Staff ==
- Roberto Scarpini
- Eva Gini
- Letizia Gallucci
- Alberto Santi
- Umberto Cabella
- Ilaria Alesso
- Federica MIgliavacca

== Regular or semi-regular guests ==
- Evaristo Beccalossi
- Mario Corso

== Former logos ==
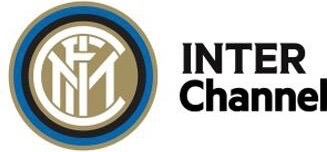
Inter Channel logo (2014–2017)
