= Lado Akhalaia (footballer, born 2002) =

Moldovan footballer

Personal information
- Date of birth: 1 July 2002 (age 24)
- Place of birth: Chișinău, Moldova
- Height: 1.90 m (6 ft 3 in)
- Position: Forward

Team information
- Current team: Vaduz
- Number: 24

Youth career
- –2018: Dacia Chișinău
- 2019–2021: Inter Milan

Senior career*
| Years | Team | Apps | (Gls) |
| 2021–2024 | Torino | 0 | (0) |
| 2022 | → Virton (loan) | 3 | (0) |
| 2023–2024 | → Swift Hesperange (loan) | 20 | (2) |
| 2025 | Würzburger Kickers | 8 | (2) |
| 2025–2026 | Greuther Fürth II | 29 | (13) |
| 2026– | Vaduz | 0 | (0) |

International career^{‡}
| 2020 | Moldova U19 | 1 | (0) |
| 2021 | Moldova U21 | 2 | (0) |
- * Club domestic league appearances and goals as of 9 August 2026 ‡ National team caps and goals as of 12 October 2021

Lado Akhalaia (born 1 July 2002) is a Moldovan professional footballer who plays as a forward for Liechtensteiner Swiss Super League club Vaduz.

== Career ==
Having started out playing for Dacia Buiucani in Moldova, Akhalaia soon attracted the attention of several European clubs, including Sporting Portugal, where he spent several months on trial. However, his stay was cut short by the crisis of 2018, when the club's management was eventually dismissed after endangering the physical integrity of its players.

As a youth player, Akhalaia joined the youth academy of Moldovan second-tier side Dacia Buiucani. In 2019, he joined the youth academy of Inter Milan in the Italian Serie A after trialling for the youth academies of Ukrainian club Shakhtar Donetsk and Sporting CP in Portugal.

In 2021, he signed for Serie A team Torino. In 2022, Akhalaia was sent on loan to Virton in the Belgian second tier. On 14 January 2023, he moved on a new loan to Swift Hesperange in Luxembourg.

On 28 January 2025, Akhalaia signed with Würzburger Kickers in German fourth-tier Regionalliga Bayern.

== Personal life ==
He is the son of Georgia international Vladimir Akhalaia and the grandson of Moldova international and manager Alexandru Spiridon.

== Honours ==
Swift Hesperange

- Luxembourg National Division: 2022–23
