= Nicola Tintori =

Italian footballer (born 2000)

Personal information
- Date of birth: 25 February 2000 (age 26)
- Place of birth: Pescia, Italy
- Height: 1.93 m (6 ft 4 in)
- Position: Goalkeeper

Youth career
- 2012(?)–2019: Inter

Senior career*
Years	Team	Apps	(Gls)
2019–2020	Inter	0	(0)
2019–2020	→ Gozzano (loan)	2	(0)
2020–2022	Pro Vercelli	14	(0)
2022	→ Piacenza (loan)	9	(0)
2022–2023	Piacenza	12	(0)

International career^{‡}
2016	Italy U16	2	(0)
2016	Italy U17	1	(0)
- * Club domestic league appearances and goals as of 22 April 2023 ‡ National team caps and goals as of 26 August 2016

Nicola Tintori (born 25 Feb 2000) is an Italian footballer who plays as a goalkeeper.

== Club career ==
He was raised in the Inter youth system and was included in their Under-19 squad in the 2017–18 season. He was the third-choice goalkeeper on those squads behind Marco Pissardo, Vladan Đekić and Giacomo Pozzer.

On 3 August 2019, he joined Serie C club Gozzano on loan. He made his professional Serie C debut for Gozzano on 6 October 2019 in a game against Carrarese. He substituted injured Gian Marco Crespi in the 37th minute. In their next league game on 13 October 2019 against Renate, he made his first professional start. Gozzano lost with the score of 0–3 and Tintori was demoted to the third goalkeeper position on the squad as Crespi recovered from his injury. He was not selected for Gozzano's match day squad for the rest of the 2019–20 season.

On 24 September 2020 he went to Pro Vercelli on permanent deal. On 31 January 2022, Tintori moved on loan to Piacenza until the end of the season.

On 26 July 2022, Tintori returned to Piacenza on a permanent basis.

== International career ==
He was first called up to represent his country in 2016 for the Under-16 squad friendlies.
