= Lucien Agoumé =

French footballer (born 2002)

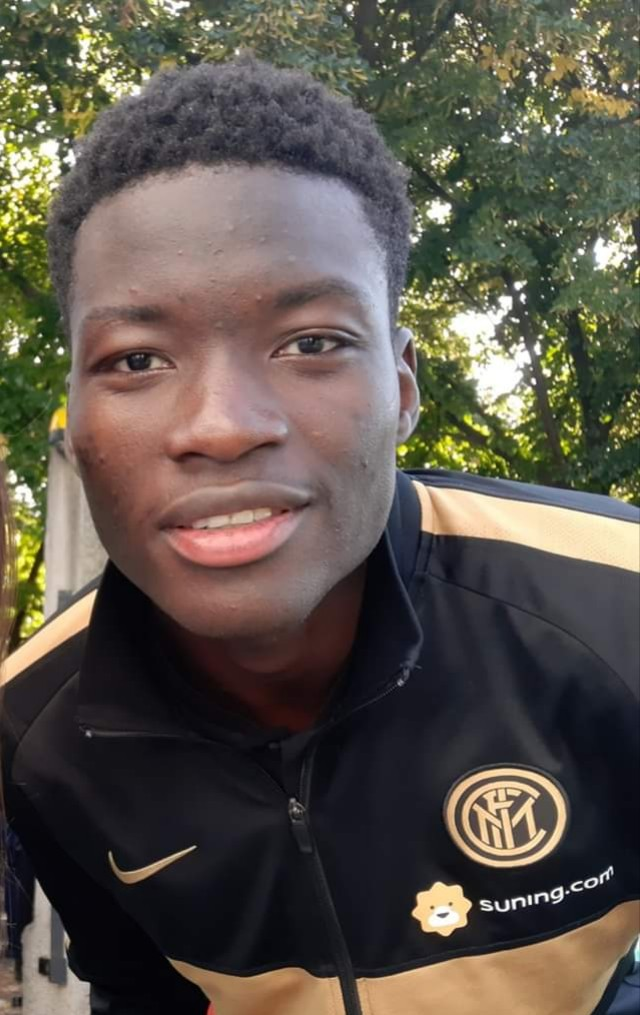
- Agoumé with Inter Milan in 2019

Personal information
- Full name: Lucien Jefferson Agoumé
- Date of birth: 9 February 2002 (age 24)
- Place of birth: Yaoundé, Cameroon
- Height: 1.88 m (6 ft 2 in)
- Position: Defensive midfielder

Team information
- Current team: Sevilla
- Number: 6

Youth career
- 2013: Clémenceau
- 2013–2014: Racing Besançon
- 2014–2018: Sochaux
- 2019–2020: Inter Milan

Senior career*
Years	Team	Apps	(Gls)
2018–2019	Sochaux B	7	(0)
2018–2019	Sochaux	15	(0)
2019–2024	Inter Milan	4	(0)
2020–2021	→ Spezia (loan)	12	(0)
2021–2022	→ Brest (loan)	27	(0)
2022–2023	→ Troyes (loan)	15	(0)
2024	→ Sevilla (loan)	12	(0)
2024–	Sevilla	69	(2)

International career^{‡}
2018	France U16	4	(2)
2018–2019	France U17	19	(3)
2019	France U18	11	(4)
2021–2022	France U20	8	(1)
2023–2025	France U21	14	(0)
Medal record
Men's football
Representing France
UEFA European Under-17 Championship
Bronze medal – third place	2019 Ireland
- * Club domestic league appearances and goals as of 27 May 2026 ‡ National team caps and goals as of 25 June 2025

Lucien Jefferson Agoumé (born 9 February 2002) is a French professional footballer who plays as a defensive midfielder for La Liga club Sevilla.

== Club career ==
=== Sochaux ===
Prior to joining Sochaux, Agoumé started his career with Clémenceau Besançon in 2013, and signed for Racing Besançon during the 2013–14 season. He arrived at Sochaux in 2014. He made his professional debut on 19 October 2018. Sochaux won the game against Troyes by 2–1. He became the youngest player to debut at Sochaux. During the time he there, other clubs such as Barcelona, Inter and Lyon were watching him. Most of the time, Agoumé played as a defensive midfielder. He can also be deployed as a central midfielder and an attacking midfielder. He showed good awareness and had good pinpoint passing and innovative vision. According to Agoumé's former head coach at Sochaux, Omar Daf, he is a player that improve in games. Before Agoumé was sold to Inter, he has already made 15 appearances for Sochaux in Ligue 2 and one appearance in Coupe de France at the age of 17.

=== Inter Milan ===
Inter Milan completed the transfer of Agoumé on 5 July 2019, with a total transfer fee of €4.5 million including add-ons. According to the statement, Agoumé had signed a three-year deal with Inter Milan. He was playing for the club's Primavera for the 2019–20 season. Inter had faced competition from other clubs, such as Barcelona and Lyon, when signing the player. According to Oscar Damiani, one of the intermediaries in the deal, Barcelona and Manchester City wanted to sign Agoumé as well. According to Agoumé himself, he chose to join Inter because the team believes a lot in him. His attributes made Inter sign him during the summer transfer window, becoming a defensive midfielder with incredible tackle resistance. Fans compare Agoumé with Paul Pogba. His Serie A debut came on 15 December 2019. He played for a total of six minutes in the 1–1 match against Fiorentina.

==== Loan to Spezia ====
On 24 September 2020, Agoumé joined Spezia on a season-long loan.

==== Loan to Brest ====
On 31 August 2021, Agoumé joined Ligue 1 club Brest on a season-long loan.

==== Loan to Troyes ====
On 1 September 2022, Agoumé was loaned to Troyes.

=== Sevilla ===
On 10 January 2024, Agoumé joined La Liga club Sevilla on loan until the end of the season, with the deal including an option-to-buy reported to be €8 million.

On 6 August 2024, Agoumé joined Sevilla on a permanent basis.

== International career ==
Agoumé was born in Cameroon, but has French nationality. Before he became an adult, he trained for many years with various French teams. The France national team has a long history and was the 1998 World Cup champions. So far, he has played in international competitions for the French U16, U17 and U18 youth teams. His U16 debut came on 5 May 2018, and scored two goals in four games. As a defensive midfielder, his efficiency has brought attention from clubs around the world. Five months later, he jumped into the French U17 youth team and scored four goals in 23 international matches.

On 20 August 2019, Agoumé made his debut for the French U18 youth team. Right now, he is also the captain of the team. In 2019, he scored a goal each against Paraguay U18 and Senegal U17. So far, he has made eleven appearances for the U18 team and scored four goals.

=== FIFA U-17 World Cup ===
Agoumé participated in the U17 World Cup, with him also captaining the team. He scored a goal in the U17 World Cup group match against Chile on 27 October 2019. He played for the team six times throughout the tournament, five of which were as captain, leading the team to third place in the tournament. His performance ranked him among the top ten notable players in the tournament by FIFA. His physical condition and passing skills caused him to be noticed by fans. After a 3–2 loss to Brazil in the tournament, where Agoumé was unable to make an appearance because of suspension, the coach Jean-Claude Giuntini admitted that Agoumé is an important player for the team. His teammate, Nathanael Mbuku, said during the interview that Agoumé's absence was detrimental. He also said in the interview: "He's the captain and he's a player who can put his stamp on a game. He's someone we needed".

== Personal life ==
Agoumé is a supporter of Marseille.

== Career statistics ==
=== Club ===
As of match played 23 May 2026

Appearances and goals by club, season and competition
Club	Season	League			National cup (Note: Includes Coupe de France, Coppa Italia, Copa del Rey)		League cup (Note: Includes Coupe de la Ligue)		Europe		Other		Total	
Club	Season	Division	Apps	Goals	Apps	Goals	Apps	Goals	Apps	Goals	Apps	Goals	Apps	Goals
Sochaux	2018–19	Ligue 2	15	0	2	0	0	0	—		—		17	0
Inter Milan	2019–20	Serie A	3	0	0	0	—		0	0	—		3	0
Inter Milan	2023–24	Serie A	1	0	0	0	—		0	0	0	0	1	0
Inter Milan	Total		4	0	0	0	—		0	0	0	0	4	0
Spezia (loan)	2020–21	Serie A	12	0	1	0	—		—		—		13	0
Brest (loan)	2021–22	Ligue 1	27	0	3	0	—		—		—		30	0
Troyes (loan)	2022–23	Ligue 1	15	0	0	0	—		—		—		15	0
Sevilla (loan)	2023–24	La Liga	12	0	1	0	—		—		—		13	0
Sevilla	2024–25	La Liga	35	1	2	0	—		—		—		37	1
Sevilla	2025–26	La Liga	34	1	2	0	—		—		—		36	1
Sevilla	Sevilla total		81	2	5	0	—		—		—		86	2
Career total			154	2	11	0	0	0	0	0	0	0	166	2

== Honours ==
France U17

- FIFA U-17 World Cup third place: 2019

Individual

- UEFA European Under-17 Championship Team of the Tournament: 2019
- Maurice Revello Tournament Best XI: 2022
