= Manuel Lombardoni =

Italian footballer

Personal information
- Full name: Manuel Lombardoni
- Date of birth: 19 December 1998 (age 27)
- Place of birth: Bergamo, Italy
- Height: 1.90 m (6 ft 3 in)
- Position: Defender

Team information
- Current team: Pro Patria
- Number: 19

Youth career
- –2016: Virtus Bergamo
- 2015–2016: → Internazionale (loan)
- 2016–2018: Internazionale

Senior career*
Years	Team	Apps	(Gls)
2018–2019	Internazionale	0	(0)
2018–2019	→ Pro Patria (loan)	23	(0)
2019–	Pro Patria	89	(4)
- * Club domestic league appearances and goals as of 3 May 2024

Manuel Lombardoni (born 19 December 1998) is an Italian professional footballer who plays as a defender for Serie D club Pro Patria.

== Early career ==
Manuel was born in Bergamo in 1998.

== Club career ==
=== Internazionale ===
Lombardoni is a youth product of Inter youth sector. He made some appearances in the bench in the mid-season of the 2017–18 season both in Serie A and Coppa Italia, but he never appeared in the field. At Inter he played the first year in the Berretti team, winning the championship against Torino in the final. In addition, he made his debut at the Viareggio tournament with the Primavera coached by Stefano Vecchi. The following year he played for Inter's Primavera team and won the championship. During this season Manuel had groin pain and for this reason he did not take part in the final stages. During 2017–18 he won the league title, the super cup and reached the quarter-finals of the Youth League against Manchester City.

==== Loan to Pro Patria ====
On 11 July 2018, Lombardoni was loaned to Serie C club Pro Patria on a season-long loan deal. Two months later, on 16 September, Lombardoni made his professional debut in Serie C for Pro Patria in a 2–1 home win over Pistoiese, he played the entire match. He became Aurora Pro Patria's first-choice in the first part of the season. On 9 December he was sent-off, for the first time in his professional career, with a double yellow card in the 62nd minute of a 1–1 home draw against Gozzano. In February he injured his shoulder while staying out of the fields to recover. Lombardoni ended his season-long loan to Aurora Pro Patria with 23 appearances, including 20 as a starter, and making 1 assist.

=== Pro Patria ===
On 16 July 2019, Lombardoni returned to Serie C side Pro Patria on an undisclosed fee and he signed a 3-year contract. On 4 August, Lombardoni started his new season with the club with a 1–0 home win over Matelica in the first round of Coppa Italia, he played the entire match. Three weeks later, on 25 August, he scored his first professional goal in the fourth minute of a 2–1 home defeat against Monza. He became Pro Patria's first-choice early in the season. On 23 October he played his first match as a substitute against Pontedera after 10 consecutive entire matches. On 15 December, Lombardoni scored his second goal for the club in the 84th minute of a 3–0 away win over Giana Erminio. Lombardoni ended his first season at the club with 27 appearances, including 26 of them as a starter. On 22 October he scored his third goal for the club in the 27th minute of a 3–0 home win over Lucchese.

== Career statistics ==
=== Club ===
As of 24 May 2021

Club	Season	League			Cup		Europe		Other		Total	
Club	Season	League	Apps	Goals	Apps	Goals	Apps	Goals	Apps	Goals	Apps	Goals
Pro Patria (loan)	2018–19	Serie C	23	0	0	0	—		—		23	0
Pro Patria	2019–20	Serie C	25	2	2	0	—		—		27	2
Pro Patria	2020–21	Serie C	24	1	1	0	—		—		25	1
Career total			72	3	3	0	—		—		75	3

== Honours ==
=== Club ===
Inter Berretti

- Campionato Berretti: 2015–16

Inter Primavera

- Campionato Primavera 1: 2016–17, 2017–18
- Supercoppa Primavera: 2018
- Torneo Di Viareggio: 2018
