= Marco Pissardo =

Italian footballer (born 1998)

Personal information
- Date of birth: 8 January 1998 (age 28)
- Place of birth: Verbania, Italy
- Height: 1.84 m (6 ft 0 in)
- Position: Goalkeeper

Team information
- Current team: Bari
- Number: 1

Youth career
- –2016: Inter Milan

Senior career*
| Years | Team | Apps | (Gls) |
| 2016–2019 | Inter Milan | 0 | (0) |
| 2016–2017 | → Varese (loan) | 31 | (0) |
| 2018–2019 | → Monopoli (loan) | 35 | (0) |
| 2019–2021 | Arezzo | 26 | (0) |
| 2020–2021 | → Lecco (loan) | 26 | (0) |
| 2021–2022 | Lecco | 37 | (0) |
| 2022–2023 | Novara | 20 | (0) |
| 2023– | Bari | 11 | (0) |

International career
| 2013 | Italy U15 | 2 | (0) |
- * Club domestic league appearances and goals as of 12 May 2026

Marco Pissardo (born 8 January 1998) is an Italian footballer who plays as a goalkeeper for Serie C Group C club Bari.

== Club career ==
=== Inter ===
Born in Verbania, Pissardo is a youth exponent of Inter.

==== Loan to Varese ====
On 17 August 2016, Pissardo was signed by Serie D side Varese on a season-long loan deal. On 4 September he made his debut in Serie D for Varese and he kept his first clean sheet in a 1–0 away win over Cuneo, one week later, on 11 September he kept his second clean sheet in a 1–0 home win over Caratese, one more week later, Pissardo was sent off with a red card in the 76th minute of a 1–0 away win over Inveruno.

On 2 October he kept his third clean sheet in a 1–0 home win over OltrepòVoghera. Pissardo helped Varese to rech the play-off final, but the Varese lost 2–0 against Gozzano and he ended his loan to Varese with 33 appearances, 19 clean sheets and 27 goals conceded.

==== Loan to Monopoli ====
On 11 July 2018, Pissardo was loaned to Serie C side Monopoli on a season-long loan deal. On 29 July he made his debut for Monopoli in a 5–3 match won at penalties after a 1–1 home draw against Piacenza in the first round of Coppa Italia. On 22 September, Pissardo made his debut in Serie C and he kept his first clean sheet in a 0–0 away draw against Potenza.

On 6 October he kept his second clean sheet for Monopoli in a 0–0 home draw against Trapani. Ten days later he kept his third clean sheet for Monopoli, a 3–0 home win over Paganese. Pissardo helped the club to reach the play-offs, but Monopoli was eliminated by Reggina in the first round and he ended his loan to Monopoli with 38 appearances, 33 goals conceded and 14 clean sheets.

=== Arezzo ===
On 5 July 2019, Pissardo joined to Serie C club Arezzo on an undisclosed fee and a 3-year contract. On 4 August, Pissardo made his debut for the club and he kept his first clean sheet in a 1–0 home win over Turris in the first round of Coppa Italia. Three weeks later, on 25 August, he made his league debut for Arezzo in a 3–1 home win over Lecco.

On 15 September he was sent-off with a red card in the 92nd minute of a 1–1 away draw against Pergolettese. Ten days later, on 25 September, Pissardo kept his first clean sheet in Serie C, a 0–0 away draw against Como. On 27 October he kept his second clean sheet, in Serie C, in a 2–0 home win over Giana Erminio. One week later he received his second red card of the season in the 43rd minute of a 2–1 away defeat against Pontedera.

==== Loan to Lecco ====
After having made his seasonal debub with Arezzo, on 2 October 2020, Pissardo was loaned to Lecco for the 2020–21 season. On 11 November he made his debut for the club and he also kept his first clean sheet in a 1–0 home win over Novara. He became Lecco first-choice goalkeeper early in the season.

On 19 December he kept his second clean sheet for Lecco in a 2–0 home win over Pro Vercelli, and one month later, on 17 January his third in a 0–0 away draw against AlbinoLeffe. Pissardo helped Lecco to reach the play-offs, however the club lost 4–1 against Grosseto in the first round, he didn't play that match because an injury. Pissardo ended his season-long loan to Lecco with 26 appearances, 20 goals conceded and 12 clean sheets.

=== Lecco ===
On 8 July 2021, he returned to Lecco on a permanent basis, signing a multi-year contract.

=== Novara ===
On 8 July 2022, Pissardo joined Serie C club Novara on a free transfer. During his only season, he kept 5 clean sheets in 20 league matches.

On 1 September 2023, Pissardo's contract with Novara was terminated by mutual consent.

=== Bari ===
On 6 September 2023, Pissardo joined Serie B club Bari on a free transfer, signing a two-year contract.

== Career statistics ==
=== Club ===
As of 24 May 2021

Appearances and goals by club, season and competition
| Club | Season | League | | | Cup | | Europe | | Other | | Total | |
| Club | Season | League | Apps | Goals | Apps | Goals | Apps | Goals | Apps | Goals | Apps | Goals |
|---|---|---|---|---|---|---|---|---|---|---|---|---|
| Varese (loan) | 2016–17 | Serie D | 31 | 0 | — | | — | | 2 (Note: All appearance(s) in Serie D play-off.) | 0 | 33 | 0 |
| Inter Milan | 2017–18 | Serie A | 0 | 0 | 0 | 0 | — | | — | | 0 | 0 |
| Monopoli (loan) | 2018–19 | Serie C | 35 | 0 | 2 | 0 | — | | 1 (Note: All appearance(s) in Serie C play-off.) | 0 | 38 | 0 |
| Arezzo | 2019–20 | Serie C | 25 | 0 | 2 | 0 | — | | — | | 27 | 0 |
| Arezzo | 2020–21 | Serie C | 1 | 0 | 1 | 0 | — | | — | | 2 | 0 |
| Lecco (loan) | 2020–21 | Serie C | 26 | 0 | 0 | 0 | — | | — | | 26 | 0 |
| Lecco | 2021–22 | Serie C | 0 | 0 | 0 | 0 | — | | — | | 0 | 0 |
| Career total | | | 118 | 0 | 4 | 0 | — | | 3 | 0 | 125 | 0 |

== Honours ==
=== Club ===
Inter Primavera

- Torneo di Viareggio: 2015, 2018
- Coppa Italia Primavera: 2015–16
- Supercoppa Primavera: 2018
- Campionato Nazionale Primavera: 2017–18
