= Centro Sportivo Angelo Moratti =

Coordinates: 45.721312°N 8.967054°E

- Pinetina
- Interactive map of Centro Sportivo Angelo Moratti
- Location: Appiano Gentile
- Owner: FC Internazionale Milano
- Capacity: 300
- Type: Football training facility

Construction
- Built: 1960
- Opened: 1962

Angelo Moratti Sports Centre (in Italian: Centro Sportivo Angelo Moratti), currently known as BPER Training Centre in Memory of Angelo Moratti for sponsorship reasons, is a football training facility, owned by Inter Milan. The training ground is placed on the outside of Appiano Gentile, a comune in the Province of Como in the Italian region Lombardy, located about 35 kilometres (22 mi) northwest of Milan and about 12 kilometres (7 mi) southwest of Como. The facility is commonly known as the Pinetina.

The centre is used as a training ground for the Inter Milan men's team.

== History ==
The construction work for the training ground started in 1960 under the Great Inter chairman Angelo Moratti and coach Helenio Herrera. The facility was ready for the 1961–62 season, and has been used uninterruptedly by Inter Milan since then.

In 2016, the centre was renamed Suning Training Centre in Memory of Angelo Moratti (in Italian: Centro Sportivo Suning in memoria di Angelo Moratti) for sponsorship reason.

In 2024, the centre changed name after Suning relinquished the ownership of the club, with BPER Banca acquiring the naming rights; it has since become known as the BPER Training Centre in Memory of Angelo Moratti.

== Training complex ==
The training area includes:

- five regular playing fields, of which:
  - two of reduced size;
  - one with a mobile pressostatic cover, used in case of cold and bad weather;
- a swimming pool that allows counter-current swimming and hydro massage;
- two gyms for heating and muscle building;
- a medical room;
- five locker rooms;
- two warehouses.

The media center includes:

- a hotel;
- two offices;
- a parking garage;
- the press room, which can accommodate up to 30 journalists, for press conferences;
- the Inter TV television studios.
