= Felice D'Amico =

Italian footballer

Personal information
- Date of birth: 22 August 2000 (age 26)
- Place of birth: Palermo, Italy
- Height: 1.75 m (5 ft 9 in)
- Position: Forward

Team information
- Current team: Caratese

Youth career
- –2018: Palermo
- 2017–2018: → Inter (loan)
- 2018–2020: Inter
- 2019: → Chievo (loan)
- 2019–2020: → Sampdoria (loan)

Senior career*
Years	Team	Apps	(Gls)
2020	Inter	0	(0)
2020	→ Sampdoria (loan)	2	(0)
2020–2023	Sampdoria	0	(0)
2020–2021	→ Chievo (loan)	2	(0)
2021	→ Pro Sesto (loan)	15	(3)
2021–2022	→ Gubbio (loan)	28	(3)
2022–2023	→ Pro Sesto (loan)	31	(3)
2023–2024	Avellino	3	(0)
2024	→ Fiorenzuola (loan)	15	(3)
2024–2025	Team Altamura	30	(4)
2025–2026	Foggia	29	(4)
2026–	Caratese	0	(0)

International career^{‡}
2015	Italy U16	4	(0)
2016	Italy U17	1	(0)
2017	Italy U18	6	(4)
- * Club domestic league appearances and goals as of 1 May 2026 ‡ National team caps and goals as of 13 December 2017

Felice D'Amico (born 22 August 2000) is an Italian professional footballer who plays as a forward for Serie C club Caratese.

== Club career ==
He played for the Primavera (Under-19 squads) of Palermo, Inter, Chievo and Sampdoria. With Inter, he played in the 2018–19 UEFA Youth League.

He made his Serie A debut for Sampdoria on 5 July 2020 in a game against SPAL. He substituted Karol Linetty in the 89th minute.

On 1 October 2020, he returned to Chievo on a season-long loan. On 29 January 2021, he was recalled from Chievo loan after making just two substitute appearances for the club and was loaned to Serie C club Pro Sesto. On 19 July 2021, he joined Gubbio on loan.

On 10 July 2022, D'Amico returned to Pro Sesto on a new loan.

On 12 July 2023, D'Amico signed a three-year contract with Avellino.

== International career ==
He was first called up to represent his country in 2015 for the Under-16 friendlies. He also played for Italy on the Under-17 and Under-18 levels, all in friendlies.
