= Vincenzo Tommasone =

Italian footballer

Personal information
- Date of birth: 30 June 1995 (age 31)
- Place of birth: Cassino, Italy
- Height: 1.79 m (5 ft 10 1/2 in)
- Position: Forward

Team information
- Current team: Gallipoli
- Number: 9

Youth career
- Venafro
- 2009–2012: Lazio
- 2012: Sesto Campano
- 2012–2013: Inter Milan
- 2013–2014: Genoa

Senior career*
Years	Team	Apps	(Gls)
2014–2015	Genoa	0	(0)
2015	→ Lugano U21 (loan)	10	(1)
2015–2020	Inter Milan	0	(0)
2016	→ Paganese (loan)	7	(0)
2016–2017	→ Reggina (loan)	6	(0)
2017–2018	→ Santarcangelo (loan)	9	(1)
2018–2019	→ Rieti (loan)	17	(1)
2019–2020	→ Carpi (loan)	0	(0)
2020–2021	Matese	2	(1)
2021	Rieti	12	(1)
2021–2023	Gravina	65	(2)
2023–	Gallipoli	10	(0)
- * Club domestic league appearances and goals as of 7 January 2024

Vincenzo Tommasone (born 30 June 1995) is an Italian footballer who plays as a forward for Serie D side Gallipoli.

== Club career ==
=== Youth career ===
Born in Cassino, in the region of Lazio, Tommasone started his career at Molisan club Venafro. He was then signed by Serie A club Lazio in 2009. Tommasone was a member of Lazio's under-15 team during the 2009–10 season. In summer 2012, he returned to the Molise region, signing for Sesto Campano, before leaving for Serie A club Inter Milan on 30 August, initially in a temporary deal. He was signed by Inter outright in July 2013.

=== Inter and loaning out ===
On 2 September 2013, Tommasone was sold to fellow Serie A club Genoa in a co-ownership deal, with Michael Ventre moving in the opposite direction. The 50% registration rights of Tommasone was sold for €1.75 million and Ventre's 50% rights was acquired by Inter for €1.82 million, making the deal involved €70,000 cash only. Tommasone played for Genoa's reserve team in the 2013–14 season. He remained as one of the four overage players of the team in the first half of the 2014–15 season. He moved to the Italian-speaking part of Switzerland, joining FC Lugano in the second half of the season, making his senior debut in the 1. Liga Classic for their reserve team.

In June 2015, Inter bought back Tommasone for €900,000 on a 2-year contract, with Ventre returning to Genoa also for €900,000. Tommasone only played once for the first team in the Trofeo San Nicola, a friendly tournament. He wore the number 26 shirt.

On 8 January 2016, Tommasone was signed by Lega Pro club Paganese. On 31 August, he moved to Lega Pro newcomers Reggina on loan, along with Andrea Romanò (loan) and Christian Silenzi (outright).

On 31 August 2017, he joined Serie C club Santarcangelo on loan.

On 17 July 2018, he was loaned to Serie C club Rieti for one year.

On 2 September 2019, he joined Carpi on a one-year loan.

=== Post-Inter ===
In October 2020, Tommasone was signed by Serie D club Matese. He made two substitute appearances, scoring one goal for the club, before re-joining former side Rieti on a permanent deal in January 2021.
