= Davide Grassini =

Italian footballer (born 2000)

Personal information
- Date of birth: 4 May 2000 (age 26)
- Place of birth: Busto Arsizio, Italy
- Height: 1.81 m (5 ft 11 in)
- Position: Defender

Team information
- Current team: Lecco
- Number: 77

Youth career
- Inter Milan

Senior career*
Years	Team	Apps	(Gls)
2019–2020	Inter Milan	0	(0)
2019–2020	→ Ravenna (loan)	16	(0)
2020–2025	Carrarese	90	(0)
2025–	Lecco	15	(0)
2026	→ Považská Bystrica (loan)	13	(0)

International career
2015	Italy U15	8	(1)
2015–2016	Italy U16	12	(0)
2017	Italy U17	2	(0)
- * Club domestic league appearances and goals as of 22 August 2026

Davide Grassini (born 4 May 2000) is an Italian professional footballer who plays as a defender for Serie C Group A club Lecco.

== Club career ==
=== Inter Milan ===
Born in Busto Arsizio, Grassini was a youth exponent of Inter.

==== Loan to Ravenna ====
On 19 July 2019, Grassini was loaned to Serie C club Ravenna on a season-long loan deal. On 25 August he made his professional debut in Serie C as a substitute replacing Giacomo Nigretti in the 46th minute of a 2–1 away defeat against Fermana. One week later, on 1 September, he played his first entire match for the club, a 2–1 home defeat against Reggiana. Grassini ended his season long loan to Ravenna with 16 appearances, including 8 as a starter, and making 1 assist, however Ravenna was relegate to Serie D after having lost 3–0 on aggregate in the play-out against Alma Juventus Fano, he remained an unused substitute in both matches.

=== Carrarrese ===
On 14 September 2020 he signed with Carrarese.

=== Lecco ===
On 3 January 2025, Grassini moved to Lecco on a 2.5-year contract.

== Career statistics ==
=== Club ===
As of match played 15 December 2021

Appearances and goals by club, season and competition
Club	Season	League			National cup		League cup		Other		Total	
Club	Season	Division	Apps	Goals	Apps	Goals	Apps	Goals	Apps	Goals	Apps	Goals
Ravenna (loan)	2019–20	Serie C	16	0	0	0	0	0	—		16	0
Carrarese	2020–21	Serie C	15	0	2	0	0	0	—		17	0
Carrarese	2021–22	Serie C	10	0	0	0	1	0	—		11	0
Carrarese	Total		25	0	2	0	1	0	0	0	28	0
Career total			41	0	2	0	1	0	0	0	44	0
