= 2021–22 Inter Milan season =

Inter Milan
2021–22 season
- Chairman: Steven Zhang
- Head coach: Simone Inzaghi
- Stadium: San Siro
- Serie A: 2nd
- Coppa Italia: Winners
- Supercoppa Italiana: Winners
- UEFA Champions League: Round of 16
- Top goalscorer: League: Lautaro Martínez (21); All: Lautaro Martínez (25)
Home colours	Away colours	Third colours

The 2021–22 season was the 114th season in the existence of Inter Milan and the club's 106th consecutive season in the top division of Italian football. In addition to the domestic league, Inter participated in this season's editions of the Coppa Italia, the Supercoppa Italiana and the UEFA Champions League, winning the former two tournaments.

== Kits ==
Supplier: Nike / Sponsors: Socios.com (front) / Lenovo (back) / DigitalBits (sleeve)

Outfield players kits

Home	Home alt.	Away	Away alt.	Away alt. 2	UCL away	Third

Goalkeeper kits

Goalkeeper 1	Goalkeeper 2	Goalkeeper 3	Goalkeeper 4 (Note: vs. FC Shakhtar Donetsk, UEFA Champions League group stage.)

== Players ==
=== First-team squad ===
As of 30 June 2022

Note: Flags indicate national team as defined under FIFA eligibility rules. Players may hold more than one non-FIFA nationality.

No.	Player	Nat.	Position(s)	Date of birth (age)	Signed in	Signed from
Goalkeepers
1	Samir Handanović (captain)	(Slovenia)	GK	14 July 1984 (aged 37)	2012	(Italy) Udinese
21	Alex Cordaz	(Italy)	GK	1 January 1983 (aged 39)	2021	(Italy) Crotone
97	Ionuț Radu	(Romania)	GK	28 May 1997 (aged 25)	2019	(Italy) Genoa
Defenders
2	Denzel Dumfries	(Netherlands)	RM / RWB	18 April 1996 (aged 26)	2021	(Netherlands) PSV
6	Stefan de Vrij	(Netherlands)	CB	5 February 1992 (aged 30)	2018	(Italy) Lazio
11	Aleksandar Kolarov	(Serbia)	LWB / LM / CB	10 November 1985 (aged 36)	2020	(Italy) Roma
13	Andrea Ranocchia (vice-captain)	(Italy)	CB	16 February 1988 (aged 34)	2010	(Italy) Genoa
18	Robin Gosens	(Germany)	LWB / LM	5 July 1994 (aged 27)	2022	(Italy) Atalanta (loan)
32	Federico Dimarco	(Italy)	LWB / LM / CB	10 November 1997 (aged 24)	2018	(Switzerland) Sion
33	Danilo D'Ambrosio	(Italy)	CB / RB	9 September 1988 (aged 33)	2014	(Italy) Torino
36	Matteo Darmian	(Italy)	CB / RWB / RM	2 December 1989 (aged 32)	2020	(Italy) Parma
37	Milan Škriniar	(Slovakia)	CB	11 February 1995 (aged 27)	2017	(Italy) Sampdoria
46	Mattia Zanotti	(Italy)	RWB / RM	11 January 2003 (aged 19)	2021	(Italy) Youth Sector
95	Alessandro Bastoni	(Italy)	CB	13 April 1999 (aged 23)	2017	(Italy) Atalanta
Midfielders
5	Roberto Gagliardini	(Italy)	CM	7 April 1994 (aged 28)	2017	(Italy) Atalanta
8	Matías Vecino	(Uruguay)	CM	24 August 1991 (aged 30)	2017	(Italy) Fiorentina
14	Ivan Perišić	(Croatia)	LM	2 February 1989 (aged 33)	2015	(Germany) Wolfsburg
20	Hakan Çalhanoğlu	(Turkey)	CM / DM	8 February 1994 (aged 28)	2021	(Italy) Milan
22	Arturo Vidal	(Chile)	CM	22 May 1987 (aged 35)	2020	(Spain) Barcelona
23	Nicolò Barella	(Italy)	CM	7 February 1997 (aged 25)	2019	(Italy) Cagliari
77	Marcelo Brozović	(Croatia)	DM / CM	16 November 1992 (aged 29)	2015	(Croatia) Dinamo Zagreb
Forwards
7	Alexis Sánchez	(Chile)	SS	19 December 1988 (aged 33)	2019	(England) Manchester United
9	Edin Džeko	(Bosnia and Herzegovina)	ST	17 March 1986 (aged 36)	2021	(Italy) Roma
10	Lautaro Martínez	(Argentina)	ST	22 August 1997 (aged 24)	2018	(Argentina) Racing Club
19	Joaquín Correa	(Argentina)	SS	13 August 1994 (aged 27)	2021	(Italy) Lazio (loan)
88	Felipe Caicedo	(Ecuador)	ST	5 September 1988 (aged 33)	2022	(Italy) Genoa (loan)
Players transferred during the season
12	Stefano Sensi	(Italy)	CM	5 August 1995 (aged 26)	2019	(Italy) Sassuolo
48	Martín Satriano	(Uruguay)	ST	20 February 2001 (aged 20)	2021	(Italy) Youth Sector

=== Youth academy players ===
As of 20 February 2022

No.	Player	Nat.	Position(s)	Date of birth (age)
38	Mattia Sangalli	(Italy)	DM / CB	27 February 2002 (age 24)
40	William Rovida	(Italy)	GK	14 March 2003 (age 23)
41	Dennis Curatolo	(Italy)	ST	3 April 2004 (age 22)
42	Cesare Casadei	(Italy)	CM	10 January 2003 (age 23)
43	Fabio Cortinovis	(Italy)	CB	20 April 2002 (age 24)
47	Franco Carboni	(Argentina)	LWB / LM	4 April 2003 (age 23)

== Transfers ==
=== In ===
==== Transfers ====
Date	Pos.	Player	Age	Moving from	Fee	Notes	Source
Summer
22 June 2021	MF	(Turkey) Hakan Çalhanoğlu	27	(Italy) Milan	Free	(Note: Deal officialised before the opening of the summer transfer window on 1 July 2021.)	
25 June 2021	GK	(Italy) Alex Cordaz	38	(Italy) Crotone	Free		
1 July 2021	DF	(Italy) Matteo Darmian	31	(Italy) Parma	€2.5m	(Note: Bought on loan obligation.)	
8 July 2021	MF	(Italy) Francesco Nunziatini	18	(Italy) Livorno	€92,000	(Note: To play with Inter Primavera.)	
13 July 2021	DF	(Belgium) Zinho Vanheusden	21	(Belgium) Standard Liège	€16m		
14 August 2021	FW	(Bosnia and Herzegovina) Edin Džeko	35	(Italy) Roma	Free	(Note: Inter is expected to pay €1.5m in case of qualification for the Champions League at the end of the season.)	
14 August 2021	DF	(Netherlands) Denzel Dumfries	25	(Netherlands) PSV Eindhoven	€12.5m	(Note: €2.5m of additional bonuses linked to the achievement of certain objectives, reaching a potential €15m transfer fee.)	

==== On loan ====
Date	Pos.	Player	Age	Moving from	Fee	Notes	Source
Summer
26 August 2021	FW	(Argentina) Joaquín Correa	27	(Italy) Lazio	€5m	(Note: Loan with obligation to buy for €25m. Inter is also expected to pay €1m of additional bonuses linked to the achievement of certain objectives, reaching a potential €31m transfer fee.)	
Winter
27 January 2022	DF	(Germany) Robin Gosens	27	(Italy) Atalanta	N/A	(Note: Loan with obligation to buy for €15m. Inter is also expected to pay €10m of additional bonuses linked to the achievement of certain objectives, reaching a potential €25m transfer fee.)	
29 January 2022	FW	(Ecuador) Felipe Caicedo	33	(Italy) Genoa	N/A		

==== Loan returns ====
Date	Pos.	Player	Age	Moving from	Notes	Source
Summer
30 June 2021	GK	(Italy) Fabrizio Bagheria	20	(Italy) Renate		
30 June 2021	GK	(Brazil) Gabriel Brazão	20	(Spain) Oviedo		
30 June 2021	GK	(Italy) Michele Di Gregorio	23	(Italy) Monza		
30 June 2021	GK	(Italy) Giacomo Pozzer	20	(Italy) Lucchese		
30 June 2021	DF	(Italy) Niccolò Corrado	21	(Italy) Palermo		
30 June 2021	DF	(Brazil) Dalbert	27	(France) Rennes		
30 June 2021	DF	(Italy) Federico Dimarco	23	(Italy) Hellas Verona		
30 June 2021	DF	(Guadeloupe) Andreaw Gravillon	23	(France) Lorient		
30 June 2021	DF	(Italy) Lorenzo Pirola	19	(Italy) Monza		
30 June 2021	DF	(Greece) Georgios Vagiannidis	19	(Belgium) Sint-Truiden		
30 June 2021	DF	(Italy) Davide Zugaro	21	(Italy) Giana Erminio		
30 June 2021	MF	(France) Lucien Agoumé	19	(Italy) Spezia		
30 June 2021	MF	(Haiti) Christopher Attys	20	(Italy) SPAL		
30 June 2021	MF	(Italy) Antonio Candreva	34	(Italy) Sampdoria		
30 June 2021	MF	(Belgium) Xian Emmers	21	(Netherlands) Almere City		
30 June 2021	MF	(Italy) Lorenzo Gavioli	21	(Italy) Feralpisalò		
30 June 2021	MF	(Italy) Jacopo Gianelli	20	(Italy) Pro Sesto		
30 June 2021	MF	(Portugal) João Mário	28	(Portugal) Sporting CP		
30 June 2021	MF	(Austria) Valentino Lazaro	25	(Germany) Borussia Mönchengladbach		
30 June 2021	MF	(Belgium) Radja Nainggolan	33	(Italy) Cagliari		
30 June 2021	MF	(Italy) Michael Ntube	20	(Italy) Pro Sesto		
30 June 2021	MF	(Italy) Marco Pompetti	21	(Italy) Cavese		
30 June 2021	MF	(Honduras) Rigoberto Rivas	22	(Italy) Reggina		
30 June 2021	MF	(Italy) Thomas Schirò	21	(Italy) Carrarese		
30 June 2021	FW	(Argentina) Facundo Colidio	21	(Belgium) Sint-Truiden		
30 June 2021	FW	(Italy) Sebastiano Esposito	18	(Italy) Venezia		
30 June 2021	FW	(Switzerland) Darian Males	20	(Switzerland) Basel		
30 June 2021	FW	(Italy) Samuele Mulattieri	20	(Netherlands) Volendam		
30 June 2021	FW	(Italy) Matteo Politano	27	(Italy) Napoli		
30 June 2021	FW	(Italy) Eddie Salcedo	19	(Italy) Hellas Verona		
30 June 2021	FW	(Italy) Edoardo Vergani	20	(Italy) Bologna		

=== Out ===
==== Transfers ====
Date	Pos.	Player	Age	Moving to	Fee	Notes	Source
Summer
28 May 2021	GK	(Italy) Daniele Padelli	35	(Italy) Udinese	Free		
17 June 2021	DF	(England) Ashley Young	35	(England) Aston Villa	Free		
30 June 2021	MF	(Honduras) Rigoberto Rivas	22	(Italy) Reggina	€1.5m	(Note: Option to buy exercised.)	
1 July 2021	MF	(Italy) Antonio Candreva	34	(Italy) Sampdoria	€2.5m	(Note: Sold on loan obligation.)	
1 July 2021	FW	(Italy) Matteo Politano	27	(Italy) Napoli	€19m		
6 July 2021	MF	(Morocco) Achraf Hakimi	22	(France) Paris Saint-Germain	€60m	(Note: €11m of additional bonuses linked to the achievement of certain objectives, reaching a potential €71m transfer fee.)	
12 July 2021	MF	(Portugal) João Mário	28	Free agent	N/A	(Note: Termination by mutual consent. On 13 July 2021, João Mário joined Benfica as a free agent.)	
14 July 2021	FW	(Italy) Nicholas Bonfanti	19	(Italy) Modena	Undisclosed		
28 July 2021	FW	(Italy) Rosario Cancello	19	(Italy) Pergolettese	Undisclosed		
10 August 2021	MF	(Belgium) Radja Nainggolan	33	Free agent	N/A	(Note: Termination by mutual consent. On 14 August 2021, Nainggolan joined Royal Antwerp as a free agent.)	
11 August 2021	MF	(Belgium) Xian Emmers	22	(Netherlands) Roda JC	Free		
12 August 2021	FW	(Belgium) Romelu Lukaku	28	(England) Chelsea	€115m		
20 August 2021	FW	(Italy) Luca Magazzù	18	(Italy) Empoli	Undisclosed		
20 August 2021	MF	(Italy) Thomas Schirò	21	(Italy) Crotone	Undisclosed		
20 August 2021	GK	(Italy) Giacomo Pozzer	20	(Italy) Juve Stabia	Undisclosed		
24 August 2021	DF	(Italy) Michael Ntube	20	(Italy) AlbinoLeffe	Undisclosed		
30 August 2021	MF	(Italy) Stefano Cester	19	(Italy) Vicenza	Undisclosed		
31 August 2021	FW	(Italy) Edoardo Vergani	20	(Italy) Salernitana	Undisclosed		
31 August 2021	DF	(France) Étienne Youte Kinkoue	19	(Greece) Olympiacos	Undisclosed		
3 September 2021	DF	(Greece) Georgios Vagiannidis	19	(Greece) Panathinaikos	Free		
Winter
17 December 2021	MF	(Denmark) Christian Eriksen	29	Free agent	N/A	(Note: Termination by mutual consent.)	

==== Loans out ====
Date	Pos.	Player	Age	Moving to	Fee	Notes	Source
Summer
29 June 2021	GK	(Italy) Michele Di Gregorio	23	(Italy) Monza	N/A	(Note: Loan with option to buy, counter-option and obligation to buy if certain conditions are met.)	
30 June 2021	MF	(Italy) Lorenzo Gavioli	21	(Italy) Reggina	N/A	(Note: Loan with obligation to buy.)	
9 July 2021	FW	(Switzerland) Darian Males	20	(Switzerland) Basel	N/A	(Note: Two-year loan with option to buy.)	
13 July 2021	FW	(Italy) Sebastiano Esposito	19	(Switzerland) Basel	N/A	(Note: Loan with option to buy and counter-option.)	
14 July 2021	DF	(Guadeloupe) Andreaw Gravillon	23	(France) Reims	N/A	(Note: Loan with obligation to buy after 17 league appearances for a reported fee of €3.5m.)	
14 July 2021	DF	(Italy) Lorenzo Pirola	19	(Italy) Monza	N/A		
18 July 2021	DF	(Belgium) Zinho Vanheusden	21	(Italy) Genoa	N/A		
21 July 2021	DF	(Brazil) Dalbert	27	(Italy) Cagliari	N/A	(Note: Loan with option to buy set at €7m.)	
22 July 2021	DF	(Italy) Niccolò Corrado	21	(Italy) Feralpisalò	N/A		
22 July 2021	MF	(Argentina) Franco Vezzoni	19	(Italy) Pro Patria	N/A		
22 July 2021	DF	(Italy) Davide Zugaro	21	(Italy) Virtus Verona	N/A		
23 July 2021	GK	(Italy) Fabrizio Bagheria	20	(Italy) Pro Sesto	N/A		
23 July 2021	MF	(Italy) Jacopo Gianelli	20	(Italy) Pro Sesto	N/A		
23 July 2021	MF	(Italy) Marco Pompetti	21	(Italy) Pescara	N/A		
27 July 2021	FW	(Italy) Samuele Mulattieri	20	(Italy) Crotone	N/A		
29 July 2021	MF	(Belgium) Tibo Persyn	19	(Belgium) Club Brugge	N/A	(Note: Loan with option to buy.)	
31 July 2021	DF	(Italy) Christian Dimarco	19	(Italy) Fiorenzuola	N/A		
4 August 2021	GK	(Serbia) Filip Stanković	19	(Netherlands) Volendam	N/A		
10 August 2021	FW	(Italy) Gaetano Oristanio	18	(Netherlands) Volendam	N/A		
10 August 2021	MF	(Italy) Riccardo Boscolo Chio	19	(Italy) Imolese	N/A		
18 August 2021	DF	(Italy) Edoardo Sottini	19	(Italy) Pistoiese	N/A		
18 August 2021	DF	(Italy) Lorenzo Moretti	19	(Italy) Pistoiese	N/A		
19 August 2021	MF	(Sweden) Elvis Lindkvist	19	(Italy) Torino	N/A		
24 August 2021	MF	(Italy) Niccolò Squizzato	19	(Italy) Juve Stabia	N/A		
25 August 2021	FW	(Italy) Andrea Pinamonti	22	(Italy) Empoli	N/A		
31 August 2021	MF	(Italy) David Wieser	19	(Italy) Bologna	N/A		
31 August 2021	MF	(Austria) Valentino Lazaro	25	(Portugal) Benfica	N/A		
31 August 2021	MF	(France) Lucien Agoumé	19	(France) Brest	N/A		
31 August 2021	FW	(Italy) Matias Fonseca	20	(Italy) Pergolettese	N/A		
31 August 2021	FW	(Italy) Eddie Salcedo	19	(Italy) Spezia	N/A		
3 September 2021	MF	(Haiti) Christopher Attys	20	(Croatia) Šibenik	N/A		
Winter
4 January 2022	FW	(Argentina) Facundo Colidio	22	(Argentina) Tigre	N/A		
17 January 2022	FW	(Uruguay) Martín Satriano	20	(France) Brest	N/A		
28 January 2022	MF	(Italy) Stefano Sensi	26	(Italy) Sampdoria	N/A		
3 March 2022	GK	(Brazil) Gabriel Brazão	21	(Brazil) Cruzeiro	N/A		

==== Loans ended ====
Date	Pos.	Player	Age	Moving to	Notes	Source
Summer
30 June 2021	DF	(Italy) Matteo Darmian	31	(Italy) Parma		

== Pre-season and friendlies ==
Win Draw Loss Fixtures

14 July 2021 Friendly	Internazionale	16–0	Sarnico	Appiano Gentile
	Satriano; Pinamonti; Mulattieri; Dimarco; Gagliardini; Ranocchia; D'Ambrosio; Nunziatini; Colidio	Report		Stadium: Centro Sportivo Suning

17 July 2021 Lugano Region Cup	Lugano	2–2 (3–4 p)	Internazionale	Lugano, Switzerland
20:30 CEST (UTC+2)	Lovrić 30'; Facchinetti 35'	Report	D'Ambrosio 38'; Satriano 54'	Stadium: Cornaredo Stadium; Referee: Luca Piccolo
	Penalties
	Marić (penalty scored); Ba (penalty scored); Lovrić (penalty scored); Guidotti (penalty missed); Čovilo (penalty missed)		(penalty scored) Dimarco; (penalty scored) Pinamonti; (penalty scored) Colidio; (penalty missed) Gagliardini; (penalty scored) Ranocchia

21 July 2021 Friendly	Internazionale	4–0	Pro Vercelli	Appiano Gentile
	Brozović; Çalhanoğlu; Mulattieri	Report		Stadium: Centro Sportivo Suning

25 July 2021 Friendly	Internazionale	8–0	Pergolettese	Appiano Gentile
18:00 CEST (UTC+2)	Darmian; Satriano; Pinamonti; Gagliardini; Nunziatini	Report		Stadium: Centro Sportivo Suning

26 July 2021 Florida Cup	Arsenal	Cancelled	Internazionale	Orlando, United States
--:-- CEST (UTC+2)				Stadium: Camping World Stadium
Note: Inter announced that they would not be travelling to the United States for the Florida Cup due to the risks involved in international travel as a result of the spread of the COVID-19 pandemic.

28 July 2021 Friendly	Internazionale	6–0	Crotone	Appiano Gentile
18:00 CEST (UTC+2)	Satriano 10'; Dimarco 22'; Çalhanoğlu 27'; Pinamonti 56'; Sensi 58'; Brozović 65'	Report		Stadium: Centro Sportivo Suning

8 August 2021 Friendly	Parma	0–2	Internazionale	Parma
19:00 CEST (UTC+2)	Schiattarella (yellow card) 86'	Report	Brozović 59'; Vecino 69'; Vidal (yellow card) 90'	Stadium: Stadio Ennio Tardini; Referee: Gianluca Aureliano

14 August 2021 Friendly	Internazionale	3–0	Dynamo Kyiv	Monza
18:30 CEST (UTC+2)	Barella 13'; Džeko 34'; Sensi 60'	Report		Stadium: U-Power Stadium; Attendance: 0 Referee: Marco Piccinini

== Competitions ==
=== Overview ===
Competition	First match	Last match	Starting round	Final position	Record							
Competition	First match	Last match	Starting round	Final position	Pld	W	D	L	GF	GA	GD	Win %
Serie A	21 August 2021	22 May 2022	Matchday 1	2nd	38	25	9	4	84	32	+52	65.79
Coppa Italia	19 January 2022	11 May 2022	Round of 16	Winners	5	4	1	0	12	4	+8	80.00
Supercoppa Italiana	12 January 2022		Final	Winners	1	1	0	0	2	1	+1	100.00
UEFA Champions League	15 September 2021	8 March 2022	Group stage	Round of 16	8	4	1	3	9	7	+2	50.00
Total					52	34	11	7	107	44	+63	65.38

Source: Soccerway

=== Serie A ===
==== League table ====
Pos	Team	Pld	W	D	L	GF	GA	GD	Pts	Qualification or relegation
1	Milan (C)	38	26	8	4	69	31	+38	86	Qualification for the Champions League group stage
2	Inter Milan	38	25	9	4	84	32	+52	84	Qualification for the Champions League group stage
3	Napoli	38	24	7	7	74	31	+43	79	Qualification for the Champions League group stage
4	Juventus	38	20	10	8	57	37	+20	70	Qualification for the Champions League group stage
5	Lazio	38	18	10	10	77	58	+19	64	Qualification for the Europa League group stage (Note: Since the winners of the 2021–22 Coppa Italia, Inter Milan, qualified for the Champions League, the Europa League berth awarded to the Coppa Italia winners was passed to the sixth-placed team, and the Europa Conference League berth awarded to the sixth-placed team was passed to the seventh-placed team.)

Source: Serie A
Rules for classification: 1) Points; 2) Head-to-head points; 3) Head-to-head goal difference; 4) Goal difference; 5) Goals scored; 6) Draw. (Note: Head-to-head record is used only after all the matches between the teams in question have been played)
(C) Champions

==== Results summary ====
Overall								Home						Away					
Pld	W	D	L	GF	GA	GD	Pts	W	D	L	GF	GA	GD	W	D	L	GF	GA	GD
38	25	9	4	84	32	+52	84	14	3	2	48	16	+32	11	6	2	36	16	+20

Source: Serie A

==== Results by round ====
Round	1	2	3	4	5	6	7	8	9	10	11	12	13	14	15	16	17	18	19	20	21	22	23	24	25	26	27	28	29	30	31	32	33	34	35	36	37	38
Ground	H	A	A	H	A	H	A	A	H	A	H	A	H	A	H	A	H	A	H	A	H	A	H	H	A	H	A	H	A	H	A	H	A	H	A	H	A	H
Result	W	W	D	W	W	D	W	L	D	W	W	D	W	W	W	W	W	W	W	L	W	D	W	L	D	L	D	W	D	D	W	W	W	W	W	W	W	W
Position	1	2	4	2	2	3	3	3	3	3	3	3	3	3	3	2	1	1	1	1	1	1	1	1	2	2	3	2	3	3	3	2	2	2	2	2	2	2

Source: Serie A
A = Away; H = Home; W = Win; D = Draw; L = Loss

==== Matches ====
The league fixtures were announced on 14 July 2021.

21 August 2021 1	Internazionale	4–0	Genoa	Milan
18:30 CEST (UTC+2)	Škriniar 6'; Çalhanoğlu 14'; Vidal 74'; Vecino (yellow card) 78'; Džeko 88'	Report	Criscito (yellow card) 1'; Sturaro (yellow card) 66'	Stadium: San Siro; Attendance: 27,402; Referee: Valerio Marini

27 August 2021 2	Hellas Verona	1–3	Internazionale	Verona
20:45 CEST (UTC+2)	Ilić 15'; Magnani (yellow card) 28'; Tameze (yellow card) 88'	Report	Martínez 47', (yellow card) 57'; Brozović (yellow card) 65'; Correa 83', 90+4'	Stadium: Stadio Marcantonio Bentegodi; Attendance: 11,214; Referee: Gianluca Manganiello

12 September 2021 3	Sampdoria	2–2	Internazionale	Genoa
12:30 CEST (UTC+2)	Yoshida 32'; Thorsby (yellow card) 35'; Augello 47'; Bereszyński (yellow card) 67'; Colley (yellow card) 82'; Silva (yellow card) 88'	Report	Dimarco 18'; Brozović (yellow card) 22'; Martínez 44'; Džeko (yellow card) 89'; Correa (yellow card) 90'; Vidal (yellow card) 90+3'	Stadium: Stadio Luigi Ferraris; Attendance: 7,441; Referee: Daniele Orsato

18 September 2021 4	Internazionale	6–1	Bologna	Milan
18:00 CEST (UTC+2)	Martínez 6'; Škriniar 30'; Barella 34'; Vecino 54'; Džeko 63', 68'	Report	De Silvestri (yellow card) 23'; Hickey (yellow card) 36'; Dijks (yellow card) 83'; Theate 86'	Stadium: San Siro; Attendance: 35,278; Referee: Giovanni Ayroldi

21 September 2021 5	Fiorentina	1–3	Internazionale	Florence
20:45 CEST (UTC+2)	Sottil 23'; González (yellow card) 78' (yellow-red card) 78'	Report	Škriniar (yellow card) 18'; Darmian 52', (yellow card) 63'; Džeko 55'; Çalhanoğlu (yellow card) 83'; Perišić 87'	Stadium: Stadio Artemio Franchi; Attendance: 15,927; Referee: Michael Fabbri

25 September 2021 6	Internazionale	2–2	Atalanta	Milan
18:00 CEST (UTC+2)	Martínez 5'; Bastoni (yellow card) 12'; Çalhanoğlu (yellow card) 43'; Barella (yellow card) 70'; Džeko 71'; Dimarco (penalty missed) 85'	Report	Malinovskyi (yellow card) 4', (goal) 30'; Palomino (yellow card) 19'; Zapata (yellow card) 21'; Tolói 38', (yellow card) 90'; Zappacosta (yellow card) 64'	Stadium: San Siro; Attendance: 36,517; Referee: Fabio Maresca

2 October 2021 7	Sassuolo	1–2	Internazionale	Reggio Emilia
20:45 CEST (UTC+2)	Berardi 22' (pen.); Müldür (yellow card) 64'; Lopez (yellow card) 70'; Consigli (yellow card) 76'; Raspadori (yellow card) 80'	Report	Džeko 58'; Perišić (yellow card) 67'; Barella (yellow card) 70'; Martínez 78' (pen.)	Stadium: Mapei Stadium – Città del Tricolore; Attendance: 10,400; Referee: Luca Pairetto

16 October 2021 8	Lazio	3–1	Internazionale	Rome
18:00 CEST (UTC+2)	Bašić (yellow card) 27'; Immobile 64' (pen.); Felipe Anderson 81', (yellow card) 83'; Milinković-Savić (yellow card) 83', (goal) 90+1'	Report	Perišić 12' (pen.); Gagliardini (yellow card) 36'; Bastoni (yellow card) 63'; Martínez (yellow card) 83'; Dumfries (yellow card) 83'; Correa (yellow card) 87'; Darmian (yellow card) 90+1'	Stadium: Stadio Olimpico; Attendance: 42,000; Referee: Massimiliano Irrati

24 October 2021 9	Internazionale	1–1	Juventus	Milan
20:45 CEST (UTC+2)	Džeko 17'; Barella (yellow card) 40'; Perišić (yellow card) 70'	Report	Alex Sandro (yellow card) 44'; Dybala 89' (pen.); Chiellini (yellow card) 90+5'	Stadium: San Siro; Attendance: 56,532; Referee: Maurizio Mariani

27 October 2021 10	Empoli	0–2	Internazionale	Empoli
20:45 CEST (UTC+2)	Luperto (yellow card) 29'; Ricci (red card) 52'	Report	De Vrij (yellow card) 24'; D'Ambrosio 34'; Brozović (yellow card) 59'; Dimarco 66'; Gagliardini (yellow card) 75'	Stadium: Stadio Carlo Castellani; Attendance: 9,335; Referee: Daniele Chiffi

31 October 2021 11	Internazionale	2–0	Udinese	Milan
12:30 CET (UTC+1)	Correa 60', 68'	Report	Beto (yellow card) 38'; Pereyra (yellow card) 51'	Stadium: San Siro; Attendance: 48,076; Referee: Juan Luca Sacchi

7 November 2021 12	Milan	1–1	Internazionale	Milan
20:45 CET (UTC+1)	De Vrij 17' (o.g.); Ballo-Touré (yellow card) 26'	Report	Çalhanoğlu 11' (pen.); Martínez (penalty missed) 27'	Stadium: San Siro; Attendance: 56,608; Referee: Daniele Doveri

21 November 2021 13	Internazionale	3–2	Napoli	Milan
18:00 CET (UTC+1)	Çalhanoğlu 25' (pen.), (yellow card) 41'; Perišić 44'; Martínez 61'; Vidal (yellow card) 72'; Handanović (yellow card) 84'; Džeko (yellow card) 90+3'	Report	Osimhen (yellow card) 10'; Zieliński 17'; Koulibaly (yellow card) 24'; Rrahmani (yellow card) 35'; Mertens 79'	Stadium: San Siro; Attendance: 56,649; Referee: Paolo Valeri

27 November 2021 14	Venezia	0–2	Internazionale	Ferrara
20:45 CET (UTC+1)	Aramu (yellow card) 54'; Haps (yellow card) 90+6'	Report	Çalhanoğlu 34'; Martínez 90+6' (pen.)	Stadium: Stadio Paolo Mazza; Attendance: 8,303; Referee: Livio Marinelli

1 December 2021 15	Internazionale	2–0	Spezia	Milan
18:30 CET (UTC+1)	Gagliardini 36'; Martínez (yellow card) 44', (goal) 58' (pen.)	Report	Manaj (yellow card) 31'; Kiwior (yellow card) 57'	Stadium: San Siro; Attendance: 30,076; Referee: Davide Ghersini

4 December 2021 16	Roma	0–3	Internazionale	Rome
18:00 CET (UTC+1)	Ibañez (yellow card) 37'; Mancini (yellow card) 63'; Zaniolo (yellow card) 75'	Report	Çalhanoğlu 15'; Džeko 24'; Dumfries 39'; Barella (yellow card) 47'	Stadium: Stadio Olimpico; Attendance: 51,185; Referee: Marco Di Bello

12 December 2021 17	Internazionale	4–0	Cagliari	Milan
20:45 CET (UTC+1)	Martínez 29', 68', (yellow card) 33', (penalty missed) 45'; Sánchez 50'; Çalhanoğlu 66'	Report	Cragno (yellow card) 43'; Deiola (yellow card) 76'	Stadium: San Siro; Attendance: 33,712; Referee: Matteo Marchetti

17 December 2021 18	Salernitana	0–5	Internazionale	Salerno
20:45 CET (UTC+1)	Gyömbér (yellow card) 53'	Report	Perišić 11'; Barella (yellow card) 16'; Dumfries 33'; Sánchez 52'; Çalhanoğlu (yellow card) 76'; Martínez 77'; Gagliardini 87'	Stadium: Stadio Arechi; Attendance: 18,000; Referee: Maurizio Mariani

22 December 2021 19	Internazionale	1–0	Torino	Milan
18:30 CET (UTC+1)	Dumfries 30'; Çalhanoğlu (yellow card) 65'	Report		Stadium: San Siro; Attendance: 41,413; Referee: Marco Guida

9 January 2022 21	Internazionale	2–1	Lazio	Milan
20:45 CET (UTC+1)	Bastoni 30'; Škriniar 67'; Vidal (yellow card) 90'	Report	Immobile 35'; Luiz Felipe (yellow card) 40'; Bašić (yellow card) 54'; Radu (yellow card) 71'; Zaccagni (yellow card) 71'	Stadium: San Siro; Attendance: 29,471; Referee: Luca Pairetto

16 January 2022 22	Atalanta	0–0	Internazionale	Bergamo
20:45 CET (UTC+1)	De Roon (yellow card) 37'; Palomino (yellow card) 85'	Report	Brozović (yellow card) 42'; Çalhanoğlu (yellow card) 62'	Stadium: Gewiss Stadium; Attendance: 5,000; Referee: Davide Massa

22 January 2022 23	Internazionale	2–1	Venezia	Milan
18:00 CET (UTC+1)	Barella (yellow card) 25', (goal) 40'; Bastoni (yellow card) 27'; De Vrij (yellow card) 80'; Džeko 90'	Report	Henry 19'; Lezzerini (yellow card) 40'; Modolo (yellow card) 45+2'; Kiyine (yellow card) 68'; Caldara (yellow card) 79'	Stadium: San Siro; Attendance: 5,000; Referee: Matteo Marchetti

5 February 2022 24	Internazionale	1–2	Milan	Milan
18:00 CET (UTC+1)	Perišić 38'; Çalhanoğlu (yellow card) 60'; Škriniar (yellow card) 84'	Report	Romagnoli (yellow card) 21'; Brahim (yellow card) 72'; Giroud 75', 78'; Bennacer (yellow card) 76'; Krunić (yellow card) 90+2'; Hernandez (red card) 90+6'	Stadium: San Siro; Attendance: 37,918; Referee: Marco Guida

12 February 2022 25	Napoli	1–1	Internazionale	Naples
18:00 CET (UTC+1)	Insigne 7' (pen.), (yellow card) 38'	Report	Džeko 47'; Brozović (yellow card) 60'	Stadium: Stadio Diego Armando Maradona; Attendance: 27,000; Referee: Daniele Doveri

20 February 2022 26	Internazionale	0–2	Sassuolo	Milan
18:00 CET (UTC+1)	D'Ambrosio (yellow card) 86'	Report	Raspadori 8', (yellow card) 49'; Scamacca 26'; Müldür (yellow card) 59'	Stadium: San Siro; Attendance: 38,324; Referee: Francesco Fourneau

25 February 2022 27	Genoa	0–0	Internazionale	Genoa
21:00 CET (UTC+1)	Portanova (yellow card) 72'; Østigård (yellow card) 74'	Report	Perišić (yellow card) 54'	Stadium: Stadio Luigi Ferraris; Attendance: 14,314; Referee: Daniele Chiffi

4 March 2022 28	Internazionale	5–0	Salernitana	Milan
20:45 CET (UTC+1)	Darmian (yellow card) 8'; Martínez 22', 40', 56'; De Vrij (yellow card) 44'; Džeko 64', 69'	Report	Mousset (yellow card) 12'	Stadium: San Siro; Attendance: 46,287; Referee: Livio Marinelli

13 March 2022 29	Torino	1–1	Internazionale	Turin
20:45 CET (UTC+1)	Bremer 12'; Izzo (yellow card) 80'	Report	Bastoni (yellow card) 31'; Ranocchia (yellow card) 67'; Dimarco (yellow card) 81'; Gosens (yellow card) 84'; Barella (yellow card) 90'; Sánchez 90+3'	Stadium: Stadio Olimpico Grande Torino; Attendance: 15,363; Referee: Marco Guida

19 March 2022 30	Internazionale	1–1	Fiorentina	Milan
18:00 CET (UTC+1)	Dumfries 55'; D'Ambrosio (yellow card) 72'	Report	Milenković (yellow card) 39'; Torreira 50'; Saponara (yellow card) 56'	Stadium: San Siro; Attendance: 54,988; Referee: Daniele Chiffi

3 April 2022 31	Juventus	0–1	Internazionale	Turin
20:45 CEST (UTC+2)	Rabiot (yellow card) 15'; Locatelli (yellow card) 27'; Morata (yellow card) 45+1'; Cuadrado (yellow card) 45+4'	Report	Martínez (yellow card) 2'; Škriniar (yellow card) 45+4'; Çalhanoğlu 45+5' (pen.), (yellow card) 76'; Perišić (yellow card) 75'	Stadium: Juventus Stadium; Attendance: 40,093; Referee: Massimiliano Irrati

9 April 2022 32	Internazionale	2–0	Hellas Verona	Milan
18:00 CEST (UTC+2)	Barella 22'; Džeko 30'; Dumfries (yellow card) 84'; Brozović (yellow card) 90+1'	Report		Stadium: San Siro; Attendance: 61,325; Referee: Livio Marinelli

15 April 2022 33	Spezia	1–3	Internazionale	La Spezia
19:00 CEST (UTC+2)	Bastoni (yellow card) 10'; Nikolaou (yellow card) 86'; Maggiore 88'	Report	Brozović 31'; Martínez 73'; Sánchez 90+4'	Stadium: Stadio Alberto Picco; Attendance: 11,382; Referee: Fabio Maresca

23 April 2022 34	Internazionale	3–1	Roma	Milan
18:00 CEST (UTC+2)	Dumfries 30'; Brozović 40', (yellow card) 45+1'; Martínez 52'; Çalhanoğlu (yellow card) 87'	Report	Mancini (yellow card) 36'; Oliveira (yellow card) 79'; Mkhitaryan 85'	Stadium: San Siro; Attendance: 74,947; Referee: Simone Sozza

27 April 2022 20	Bologna	2–1	Internazionale	Bologna
20:15 CEST (UTC+2)	Arnautović 28', (yellow card) 55'; Sansone 81'	Report	Perišić 3'; Barella (yellow card) 56'; Dumfries (yellow card) 70'; Çalhanoğlu (yellow card) 79'	Stadium: Stadio Renato Dall'Ara; Attendance: 26,034; Referee: Daniele Doveri
Note: The match was originally scheduled for 6 January 2022, but was postponed to 27 April 2022 due to COVID-19 outbreaks within the squads.

1 May 2022 35	Udinese	1–2	Internazionale	Udine
18:00 CEST (UTC+2)	Marí (yellow card) 40'; Pereyra (yellow card) 65'; Pussetto 72'	Report	Perišić 12'; Martínez (penalty missed) 39', 39'; Vecino (yellow card) 90+2'	Stadium: Stadio Friuli; Attendance: 20,910; Referee: Daniele Chiffi

6 May 2022 36	Internazionale	4–2	Empoli	Milan
18:45 CEST (UTC+2)	Romagnoli 40' (o.g.); Martínez 45', 64', (yellow card) 64'; Sánchez 90+4'	Report	Pinamonti 5'; Asllani 28'	Stadium: San Siro; Attendance: 69,959; Referee: Gianluca Manganiello

15 May 2022 37	Cagliari	1–3	Internazionale	Cagliari
20:45 CEST (UTC+2)	Lykogiannis 53'	Report	Darmian 25', (yellow card) 37'; Martínez 51', 84'; Çalhanoğlu (yellow card) 87'	Stadium: Unipol Domus; Attendance: 15,443; Referee: Daniele Doveri

22 May 2022 38	Internazionale	3–0	Sampdoria	Milan
18:00 CEST (UTC+2)	Barella (yellow card) 30'; Perišić 49'; Correa 55', 57'	Report	Yoshida (yellow card) 5'; Ferrari (yellow card) 66'	Stadium: San Siro; Attendance: 71,109; Referee: Marco Di Bello

=== Coppa Italia ===
19 January 2022 Round of 16	Internazionale	3–2 (a.e.t.)	Empoli	Milan
21:00 CET (UTC+1)	Sánchez 13'; Vecino (yellow card) 54'; Ranocchia 90+1'; Sensi 104'	Report	Bajrami 61'; Radu 76' (o.g.); Romagnoli (yellow card) 77'	Stadium: San Siro; Attendance: 5,000; Referee: Juan Luca Sacchi

8 February 2022 Quarter-finals	Internazionale	2–0	Roma	Milan
21:00 CET (UTC+1)	Džeko 2'; Sánchez 68'	Report	Zaniolo (yellow card) 37'; Mancini (yellow card) 38'	Stadium: San Siro; Attendance: 38,000; Referee: Marco Di Bello

1 March 2022 Semi-finals; First leg	Milan	0–0	Internazionale	Milan
21:00 CET (UTC+1)		Report	Brozović (yellow card) 33'; Martínez (yellow card) 58'	Stadium: San Siro; Attendance: 53,881; Referee: Maurizio Mariani

19 April 2022 Semi-finals; Second leg	Internazionale	3–0 (3–0 agg.)	Milan	Milan
21:00 CEST (UTC+2)	Martínez 4', 40'; Škriniar (yellow card) 51'; Gosens 82'	Report	Hernandez (yellow card) 35'; Tomori (yellow card) 90'	Stadium: San Siro; Attendance: 74,508; Referee: Maurizio Mariani

11 May 2022 Final	Juventus	2–4 (a.e.t.)	Internazionale	Rome
21:00 CEST (UTC+2)	Alex Sandro 50'; Vlahović 52'; Locatelli (yellow card) 90+2'	Report	Barella 7'; Brozović (yellow card) 55'; Çalhanoğlu 80' (pen.); Perišić 98' (pen.), 102'; Vidal (yellow card) 119'	Stadium: Stadio Olimpico; Attendance: 67,944; Referee: Paolo Valeri

=== Supercoppa Italiana ===
12 January 2022 Final	Internazionale	2–1 (a.e.t.)	Juventus	Milan
21:00 CET (UTC+1)	Martínez 35' (pen.); Džeko (yellow card) 60'; Correa (yellow card) 106'; Vidal (yellow card) 118'; Sánchez 120+1'	Report	McKennie 25'; Bernardeschi (yellow card) 43'; Dybala (yellow card) 105'; Rugani (yellow card) 109'	Stadium: San Siro; Attendance: 29,696; Referee: Daniele Doveri

=== UEFA Champions League ===
==== Group stage ====
The draw for the group stage was held on 26 August 2021.

Pos	Team	Pld	W	D	L	GF	GA	GD	Pts	Qualification	RMA	INT	SHE	SHK
1	(Spain) Real Madrid	6	5	0	1	14	3	+11	15	Advance to knockout phase	—	2–0	1–2	2–1
2	(Italy) Inter Milan	6	3	1	2	8	5	+3	10	Advance to knockout phase	0–1	—	3–1	2–0
3	(Moldova) Sheriff Tiraspol	6	2	1	3	7	11	−4	7	Transfer to Europa League	0–3	1–3	—	2–0
4	(Ukraine) Shakhtar Donetsk	6	0	2	4	2	12	−10	2		0–5	0–0	1–1	—

Source: UEFA
Rules for classification: Group stage tiebreakers

15 September 2021 1	Internazionale (Italy)	0–1	(Spain) Real Madrid	Milan, Italy
21:00 CEST (UTC+2)	Martínez (yellow card) 45+1'	Report	Alaba (yellow card) 60'; Rodrygo 89'	Stadium: San Siro; Attendance: 37,082; Referee: Daniel Siebert (Germany)

28 September 2021 2	Shakhtar Donetsk (Ukraine)	0–0	(Italy) Internazionale	Kyiv, Ukraine
19:45 EEST (UTC+3)		Report	Dumfries (yellow card) 81'	Stadium: NSC Olimpiyskiy; Attendance: 26,170; Referee: István Kovács (Romania)
Note: Shakhtar Donetsk played their home matches at NSC Olimpiyskiy, Kyiv, instead of their regular stadium, Donbas Arena in Donetsk, due to the war in Donbas.

19 October 2021 3	Internazionale (Italy)	3–1	(Moldova) Sheriff Tiraspol	Milan, Italy
21:00 CEST (UTC+2)	Džeko 34'; Dimarco (yellow card) 51'; Vidal 58'; De Vrij 67'	Report	Thill 52'; Cojocaru (yellow card) 88'	Stadium: San Siro; Attendance: 43,305; Referee: Danny Makkelie (Netherlands)

3 November 2021 4	Sheriff Tiraspol (Moldova)	1–3	(Italy) Internazionale	Tiraspol, Moldova
22:00 EET (UTC+2)	Addo (yellow card) 35'; Cristiano (yellow card) 51'; Kolovos (yellow card) 61'; Costanza (yellow card) 63'; Traoré 90+2'	Report	Darmian (yellow card) 43'; Brozović 54'; Škriniar 66', (yellow card) 67'; Sánchez 82'	Stadium: Sheriff Stadium; Attendance: 5,930; Referee: Felix Zwayer (Germany)

24 November 2021 5	Internazionale (Italy)	2–0	(Ukraine) Shakhtar Donetsk	Milan, Italy
18:45 CET (UTC+1)	Džeko 61', 67'	Report	Vitão (yellow card) 49'	Stadium: San Siro; Attendance: 46,225; Referee: Ovidiu Hațegan (Romania)

7 December 2021 6	Real Madrid (Spain)	2–0	(Italy) Internazionale	Madrid, Spain
21:00 CET (UTC+1)	Kroos 17'; Militão (yellow card) 64'; Asensio 79'	Report	D'Ambrosio (yellow card) 54'; Barella (red card) 64'; Bastoni (yellow card) 74'	Stadium: Santiago Bernabéu; Attendance: 46,887; Referee: Felix Brych (Germany)

==== Knockout phase ====
===== Round of 16 =====
The draw for the round of 16 was held on 13 December 2021.

16 February 2022 First leg	Internazionale (Italy)	0–2	(England) Liverpool	Milan, Italy
21:00 CET (UTC+1)		Report	Firmino 75'; Salah 83'	Stadium: San Siro; Attendance: 37,918; Referee: Szymon Marciniak (Poland)

8 March 2022 Second leg	Liverpool (England)	0–1 (2–1 agg.)	(Italy) Internazionale	Liverpool, England
21:00 CET (UTC+1)	Jota (yellow card) 40'; Robertson (yellow card) 47'; Mané (yellow card) 71'	Report	Sánchez (yellow card) 45+4' (yellow-red card) 63'; Vidal (yellow card) 45+6'; Martínez 62'; Bastoni (yellow card) 85'; Gagliardini (yellow card) 90+4'	Stadium: Anfield; Attendance: 51,747; Referee: Antonio Mateu Lahoz (Spain)

== Statistics ==
=== Appearances and goals ===
No.	Pos	Nat	Player	Total		Serie A		Coppa Italia		Supercoppa Italiana		Champions League	
No.	Pos	Nat	Player	Apps	Goals	Apps	Goals	Apps	Goals	Apps	Goals	Apps	Goals
Goalkeepers
1	GK	(Slovenia) SLO	Samir Handanović	50	0	37	0	4	0	1	0	8	0
21	GK	(Italy) ITA	Alex Cordaz	0	0	0	0	0	0	0	0	0	0
97	GK	(Romania) ROU	Ionuț Radu	2	0	1	0	1	0	0	0	0	0
Defenders
2	DF	(Netherlands) NED	Denzel Dumfries	45	5	21+12	5	2+2	0	1	0	5+2	0
6	DF	(Netherlands) NED	Stefan de Vrij	41	1	28+2	0	3+1	0	1	0	6	1
11	DF	(Serbia) SRB	Aleksandar Kolarov	4	0	0+3	0	0	0	0	0	0+1	0
13	DF	(Italy) ITA	Andrea Ranocchia	10	1	3+3	0	1	1	0	0	1+2	0
18	DF	(Germany) GER	Robin Gosens	9	1	0+7	0	0+2	1	0	0	0	0
32	DF	(Italy) ITA	Federico Dimarco	42	2	13+19	2	1+1	0	0+1	0	3+4	0
33	DF	(Italy) ITA	Danilo D'Ambrosio	27	1	9+11	1	3+1	0	0	0	1+2	0
36	DF	(Italy) ITA	Matteo Darmian	36	2	18+7	2	4+1	0	0+1	0	3+2	0
37	DF	(Slovakia) SVK	Milan Škriniar	48	4	35	3	4	0	1	0	8	1
46	DF	(Italy) ITA	Mattia Zanotti	1	0	0+1	0	0	0	0	0	0	0
95	DF	(Italy) ITA	Alessandro Bastoni	44	1	29+2	1	3+1	0	1	0	7+1	0
Midfielders
5	MF	(Italy) ITA	Roberto Gagliardini	24	2	6+12	2	1	0	0	0	0+5	0
8	MF	(Uruguay) URU	Matías Vecino	23	1	2+15	1	1+1	0	0	0	1+3	0
14	MF	(Croatia) CRO	Ivan Perišić	49	10	35	8	4+1	2	1	0	6+2	0
20	MF	(Turkey) TUR	Hakan Çalhanoğlu	45	8	32+1	7	3+2	1	1	0	5+1	0
22	MF	(Chile) CHI	Arturo Vidal	41	2	2+26	1	2+3	0	0+1	0	4+3	1
23	MF	(Italy) ITA	Nicolò Barella	47	4	36	3	3+1	1	1	0	6	0
77	MF	(Croatia) CRO	Marcelo Brozović	48	3	35	2	4	0	1	0	8	1
Forwards
7	FW	(Chile) CHI	Alexis Sánchez	39	9	7+20	5	1+4	2	0+1	1	1+5	1
9	FW	(Bosnia and Herzegovina) BIH	Edin Džeko	49	17	27+9	13	3+2	1	1	0	7	3
10	FW	(Argentina) ARG	Lautaro Martínez	49	25	28+7	21	4+1	2	1	1	8	1
19	FW	(Argentina) ARG	Joaquín Correa	36	6	12+14	6	2+2	0	0+1	0	0+5	0
88	FW	(Ecuador) ECU	Felipe Caicedo	3	0	0+3	0	0	0	0	0	0	0
Players transferred out during the season
12	MF	(Italy) ITA	Stefano Sensi	12	1	1+8	0	0+1	1	0	0	0+2	0
48	FW	(Uruguay) URU	Martín Satriano	4	0	0+4	0	0	0	0	0	0	0

Source: Competitions

=== Goalscorers ===
Rank	No.	Pos.	Player	Serie A	Coppa Italia	Supercoppa Italiana	Champions League	Total
1	10	FW	(Argentina) Lautaro Martínez	21	2	1	1	25
2	9	FW	(Bosnia and Herzegovina) Edin Džeko	13	1	0	3	17
3	14	MF	(Croatia) Ivan Perišić	8	2	0	0	10
4	7	FW	(Chile) Alexis Sánchez	5	2	1	1	9
5	20	MF	(Turkey) Hakan Çalhanoğlu	7	1	0	0	8
6	19	FW	(Argentina) Joaquín Correa	6	0	0	0	6
7	2	DF	(Netherlands) Denzel Dumfries	5	0	0	0	5
8	23	MF	(Italy) Nicolò Barella	3	1	0	0	4
8	37	DF	(Slovakia) Milan Škriniar	3	0	0	1	4
10	77	MF	(Croatia) Marcelo Brozović	2	0	0	1	3
11	5	MF	(Italy) Roberto Gagliardini	2	0	0	0	2
11	22	MF	(Chile) Arturo Vidal	1	0	0	1	2
11	32	DF	(Italy) Federico Dimarco	2	0	0	0	2
11	36	DF	(Italy) Matteo Darmian	2	0	0	0	2
15	6	DF	(Netherlands) Stefan de Vrij	0	0	0	1	1
15	8	MF	(Uruguay) Matías Vecino	1	0	0	0	1
15	12	MF	(Italy) Stefano Sensi	0	1	0	0	1
15	13	DF	(Italy) Andrea Ranocchia	0	1	0	0	1
15	18	DF	(Germany) Robin Gosens	0	1	0	0	1
15	33	DF	(Italy) Danilo D'Ambrosio	1	0	0	0	1
15	95	DF	(Italy) Alessandro Bastoni	1	0	0	0	1
Own goals				1	0	0	0	1
Totals				84	12	2	9	107

=== Clean sheets ===
Rank	No.	Pos.	Player	Serie A	Coppa Italia	Supercoppa Italiana	Champions League	Total
1	1	GK	(Slovenia) Samir Handanović	15	3	0	3	21
Totals				15	3	0	3	21

=== Disciplinary record ===
No.	Pos.	Player	Serie A			Coppa Italia			Supercoppa Italiana			Champions League			Total		
No.	Pos.	Player	Yellow card	(yellow card) (yellow-red card)	Red card	Yellow card	(yellow card) (yellow-red card)	Red card	Yellow card	(yellow card) (yellow-red card)	Red card	Yellow card	(yellow card) (yellow-red card)	Red card	Yellow card	(yellow card) (yellow-red card)	Red card
1	GK	(Slovenia) Samir Handanović	1	0	0	0	0	0	0	0	0	0	0	0	1	0	0
2	DF	(Netherlands) Denzel Dumfries	3	0	0	0	0	0	0	0	0	1	0	0	4	0	0
5	MF	(Italy) Roberto Gagliardini	2	0	0	0	0	0	0	0	0	1	0	0	3	0	0
6	DF	(Netherlands) Stefan de Vrij	3	0	0	0	0	0	0	0	0	0	0	0	3	0	0
7	FW	(Chile) Alexis Sánchez	0	0	0	0	0	0	0	0	0	0	1	0	0	1	0
8	MF	(Uruguay) Matías Vecino	2	0	0	1	0	0	0	0	0	0	0	0	3	0	0
9	FW	(Bosnia and Herzegovina) Edin Džeko	2	0	0	0	0	0	1	0	0	0	0	0	3	0	0
10	FW	(Argentina) Lautaro Martínez	6	0	0	1	0	0	0	0	0	1	0	0	8	0	0
13	DF	(Italy) Andrea Ranocchia	1	0	0	0	0	0	0	0	0	0	0	0	1	0	0
14	MF	(Croatia) Ivan Perišić	4	0	0	0	0	0	0	0	0	0	0	0	4	0	0
18	DF	(Germany) Robin Gosens	1	0	0	0	0	0	0	0	0	0	0	0	1	0	0
19	FW	(Argentina) Joaquín Correa	2	0	0	0	0	0	1	0	0	0	0	0	3	0	0
20	MF	(Turkey) Hakan Çalhanoğlu	11	0	0	0	0	0	0	0	0	0	0	0	11	0	0
22	MF	(Chile) Arturo Vidal	3	0	0	1	0	0	1	0	0	1	0	0	6	0	0
23	MF	(Italy) Nicolò Barella	8	0	0	0	0	0	0	0	0	0	0	1	8	0	1
32	DF	(Italy) Federico Dimarco	1	0	0	0	0	0	0	0	0	1	0	0	2	0	0
33	DF	(Italy) Danilo D'Ambrosio	2	0	0	0	0	0	0	0	0	1	0	0	3	0	0
36	DF	(Italy) Matteo Darmian	4	0	0	0	0	0	0	0	0	1	0	0	5	0	0
37	DF	(Slovakia) Milan Škriniar	3	0	0	1	0	0	0	0	0	1	0	0	5	0	0
77	MF	(Croatia) Marcelo Brozović	7	0	0	2	0	0	0	0	0	0	0	0	9	0	0
95	DF	(Italy) Alessandro Bastoni	4	0	0	0	0	0	0	0	0	2	0	0	6	0	0
Totals			69	0	0	6	0	0	3	0	0	10	1	1	87	1	1
