= Danilo D'Ambrosio =

Italian footballer (born 1988)

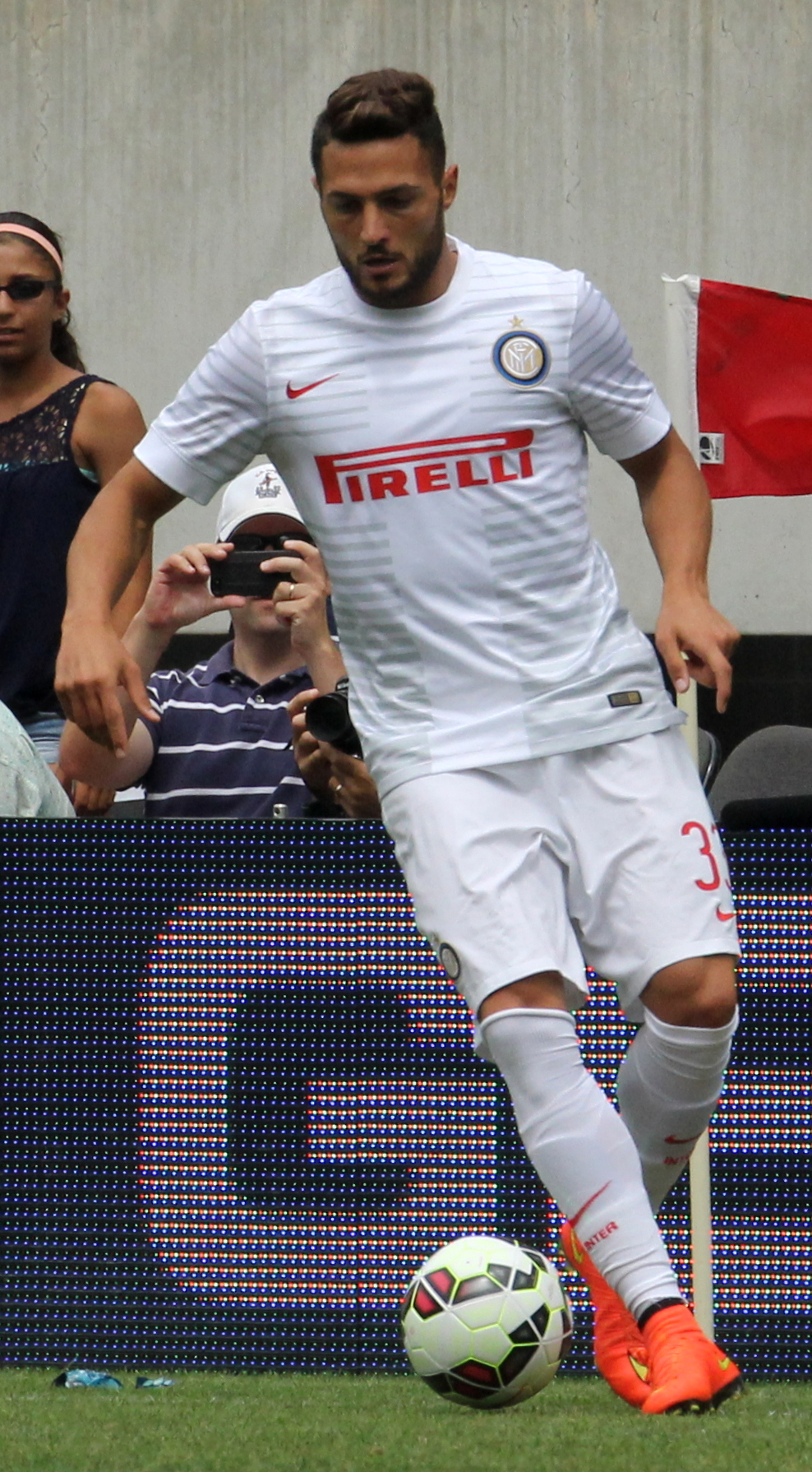
- D'Ambrosio playing for Inter Milan in 2014

Personal information
- Date of birth: 9 September 1988 (age 38)
- Place of birth: Naples, Italy
- Height: 1.81 m (5 ft 11 in)
- Positions: Centre-back; right-back

Youth career
- 2004–2005: Salernitana
- 2005–2008: Fiorentina

Senior career*
Years	Team	Apps	(Gls)
2008	Potenza	7	(0)
2008–2010	Juve Stabia	47	(2)
2010–2014	Torino	117	(10)
2014–2023	Inter Milan	226	(17)
2023–2025	Monza	44	(0)
Total		441	(29)

International career
2004	Italy U16	5	(2)
2004	Italy U17	3	(0)
2010	Italy U21	3	(0)
2017–2020	Italy	6	(0)
- * Club domestic league appearances and goals

Danilo D'Ambrosio (born 9 September 1988) is an Italian former professional footballer who primarily played as a centre-back or right-back.

== Club career ==
=== Early career ===
Born in Naples, D'Ambrosio began playing for local Campania side Salernitana. However, the club went bankrupt and he, along with his brother Dario, joined the Fiorentina youth team in 2005. He was part of the Fiorentina primavera until December 2007, but on 8 January 2008 he was sold to Serie C1 side Potenza on a co-ownership agreement. He made his professional debut on 20 January 2008 in a 2–1 victory over Juve Stabia, ultimately making ten appearances during the season. In June 2008, Fiorentina repurchased D'Ambrosio.

=== Juve Stabia ===
On 11 July 2008, D'Ambrosio joined Lega Pro Prima Divisione side Juve Stabia in another co-ownership deal, for €30,000, making his debut for Le vespe on 31 August 2008 against Taranto.

D'Ambrosio became a starter for Juve Stabia in his first season, who decided to purchase his remaining contract from Fiorentina for another €75,500. He spent the next season mostly playing as a right midfielder, even scoring his first goal in a home victory against Barletta, 4–1.

=== Torino ===
On 12 January 2010, D'Ambrosio was signed by Torino in a co-ownership agreement for a €200,000 transfer fee. He made his Serie B debut on 16 January 2010 in a 4–1 home win against Grosseto. He was a regular for Torino during the season, scoring his first goal for the granata on 20 March 2010 in a 2–0 away win against Modena. Torino purchased the remaining half of his contract from Juve Stabia in June 2010 for an additional €500,000.

During the following season, D'Ambrosio was also a starter for new coach Franco Lerda. He scored the first brace of his career in a 3–2 home win against Modena, one of the only two goals of his season. On 15 December 2010, he renewed his contract with Torino until 2014. However, his season was characterised by negative performances and Torino's failure to reach the playoffs made him the object of much criticism.

New head coach Giampiero Ventura decided to focus on D'Ambrosio for the 2011–12 season, playing him as right back with Matteo Darmian. On 2 November 2011, he scored the winning goal against Reggina. He repeated this on 11 February 2012, scoring in a 3–1 win over Nocerina. Throughout the season, D'Ambrosio contributed 26 appearances and 3 goals with Torino being promoted.

D'Ambrosio made his Serie A debut on 26 August 2012 during the goalless draw against Siena, appearing as a 93rd-minute-substitute, but did not start until 26 September against Udinese (0–0). He scored his first goal in Serie A during a 5–1 win away against Atalanta. In December 2012, he became Torino's vice-captain after Angelo Ogbonna suffered an injury. He was voted Torino's revelation of the year by the readers of Toro.it.

D'Ambrosio covered as a left back in the 2013–14 season, scoring in the 2–2 home draw against AC Milan on 14 September 2013. He scored again the following week away against Bologna, in a game won 2–1 by Torino. On 13 December 2013, Torino chairman Urbano Cairo confirmed that D'Ambrosio would be leaving the club after turning down a contract extension. The former vice-captain concluded his experience at Torino with 119 appearances and 10 goals.

=== Inter Milan ===
==== 2013–14: debut season ====
On 8 January 2014, Tuttosport reported that D'Ambrosio would join Inter in a cash plus player deal. On 28 January, Tuttosport revealed that the fee was €1.75 million cash plus the free loan of Matteo Colombi and 50% of the registration rights of Marco Benassi. (Although the transfer also cost Inter an additional €1.04M on agent and other misc. fee on top of the value of the 50% rights of Benassi (€1M) and cash paid (€1.75M)) Two days later, Inter confirmed the deal.

Three days after that, he made his debut for Nerazzurri in the Derby d'Italia against Juventus at Juventus Stadium, a 3–1 Inter loss. On 15 March, D'Ambrosio started his first match with Inter, defeating Hellas Verona 2–0 at the Stadio Marc'Antonio Bentegodi. Following that result, he secured a place in the starting lineup. D'Ambrosio was an unused substitute in Javier Zanetti's last competitive match at the San Siro, in which Inter defeated Lazio 4–1 to secure a place in UEFA Europa League play-off for next season. D'Ambrosio finished his first season with Inter having played 11 matches, 3 of which he played in their entirety.

==== 2014–2017: rise to prominence ====
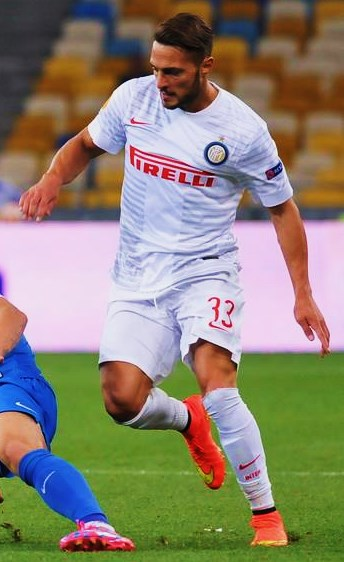
D'Ambrosio playing against Dnipro Dnipropetrovsk in September 2014

D'Ambrosio scored his first competitive goal for Inter on his European debut, a 3–0 away win over Stjarnan in the first leg of Europa League play-off. With a 6–0 victory in the second leg, Inter advanced to the group stage 9–0 on aggregate. On 18 September, in the first Europa League group match against Ukrainian side Dnipro Dnipropetrovsk, he scored the only goal of the match. D'Ambrosio described his goal as "the most important of his career". He scored again in the second group match on 2 October, opening a 2–0 home victory over Azerbaijani side Qarabağ. D'Ambrosio concluded his first full-season with Inter Milan by making 32 appearances in all competitions, scoring three times, all in Europa League.

On 20 February 2016, D'Ambrosio scored his first league goal for Inter during the 3–1 home win over Sampdoria, beating the goalkeeper with a volley in with the inside of his left boot at the back post. That was the first "Italian" goal for Inter in Serie A since Andrea Ranocchia scored on 15 December 2014. Eight days later, against Juventus for the next league match, D'Ambrosio's misplaced a header resulting in Leonardo Bonucci scoring in 47th minute; the match finished 2–0 for Juventus. Later, on 12 March against Bologna, he was again in the scoresheet for the second time this season, scoring the second goal of the match minutes before assisting the goal of Ivan Perišić, helping Inter to get its second consecutive league win.

D'Ambrosio won more playing time under head coaches Frank de Boer and Stefano Pioli, starting all the match except in October, as he was the second outfield player with most balls recovered. He scored his first strike of the season against Pescara on 28 January 2017, netting the opener in an eventual 3–0 home win. On 19 February, he set up the lone goal at Bologna scored by Gabriel Barbosa. Later, on 7 April, D'Ambrosio agreed to a contract extension, signing until 2021. Two days later, he scored against Crotone but in a 2–1 losing effort, equaling his personal best, set in 2011–12 season.

==== 2017–2020: 100 games and Europa League final ====
D'Ambrosio played his 100th Serie A match for Inter on 25 November 2017 in the 3–1 away win versus Cagliari in matchday 14. In the final matchday of the season, his goal in the 29th minute versus Lazio served as a temporary equalizer in an eventual 3–2 win at Stadio Olimpico which meant the return of Inter in UEFA Champions League after six years.

On 25 September 2018, D'Ambrosio scored his first goal of the season in a league match against Fiorentina following a combination with Mauro Icardi to give Inter the 2–1 win at San Siro, the first home win in league for the 2018–19 season.

The following year, D'Ambrosio found less space due to physical problems (albeit playing both as a left midfielder and as a central defender in coach Antonio Conte's three-man defence), but, in addition to scoring a goal that decided the match against Lazio on 25 September 2019, he reached 200 appearances for the nerazzuri on the occasion of the 4–0 win against SPAL on 16 July 2020. He finished the season with four goals in 22 games, a personal record in Serie A: notable goals include one against Napoli (2–0) and against Atalanta (2–0), scoring in the latter match after just 50 seconds. A starter in the path that took the team to the Europa League final, on 17 August he scored the second goal in a 5–0 win against Shakhtar in the semi-finals. The 2019–20 season ended with the final in Cologne on 21 August, in which Inter were defeated 3–2 by Sevilla.

==== 2020–2023: Serie A champion and Champions League final ====
In the 2020–21 season, D'Ambrosio was relegated to a supporting role, despite scoring three goals, but he was able to celebrate winning his first Serie A championship with Inter, as well as his first professional trophy. With his contract expiring at the end of the season, he renewed for another year on 28 June 2021.

On 12 January 2022, despite not playing, D'Ambrosio won his second trophy with Inter, the Supercoppa Italiana, beating Juventus 2–1 after extra time. Four days later, in a 0–0 draw against Atalanta, he reached 200 league appearances for the Nerazzurri. The following 8 March, in the second leg of the Champions League round of 16 against Liverpool, he made his 250th appearance in all competitions for Inter. On 11 May, D'Ambrosio won his third trophy for Inter, the Coppa Italia, playing as a starter in the final which was won again against Juventus 4–2 after extra time.

At the start of the 2022–23 season, on 7 September 2022, in the home defeat against Bayern Munich (2–0), he played his first Champions League match as captain. The following 8 October, in the away win against Sassuolo (2–1), he played his first match as captain in the league. On 18 January 2023, even without entering the field, he won his fourth trophy with Inter, the Supercoppa Italiana, with Inter beating rivals Milan 3–0. On 24 May he won his second consecutive Coppa Italia, the ninth in Inter's history, thanks to a 2–1 victory in the final against Fiorentina. On 10 June, he played as a substitute in the Champions League final, which was lost 1–0 against Manchester City. At the end of the season, D'Ambrosio left Inter at the natural expiry of his contract, having played 284 games and scored 21 goals in all competitions.

=== Monza ===
On 2 August 2023, D'Ambrosio signed a one-year contract with Serie A side Monza as a free agent, with an option for renewal. He left Monza at the end of the 2024–25 season, following the end of his contract.

=== Retirement ===
On 29 August 2025, D'Ambrosio decided to retire after almost 20 years as a professional footballer. He announced his retirement message on his social media.

== International career ==
On 11 August 2010, D'Ambrosio made his debut with the Italy under-21 national team in a friendly match against Denmark.

His senior international debut for Italy came on 28 March 2017, alongside four other debutants, appearing as a substitute in a 2–1 friendly away win against the Netherlands. D'Ambrosio made his first start for Italy under Roberto Mancini, in a 3–1 friendly loss to France in Nice on 1 June 2018.

== Style of play ==
D'Ambrosio was a versatile defender, able to play both as a full-back on both flanks (mainly on the right) and as a centre-back. His physical abilities also allowed him to be used as a wide midfielder, while his offensive-mindedness and his aerial prowess often led him to score goals.

== Personal life ==
D'Ambrosio has an identical twin brother Dario, who also played as a defender. Both grew up in Caivano in a football school, Sporting Caivano 94.

In April 2014, D'Ambrosio joined Twitter and with his first post claimed that for every follower he received, he would make a donation of €0.50 to the "Aiutare I Bambini" charity which gives aid to needy children in his home region of Campania. He eventually donated €11,500.

On 31 May 2016, he married Enza De Cristofaro, with whom he had two sons, Leonardo and Ludovico.

== Career statistics ==
=== Club ===
Appearances and goals by club, season and competition
Club	Season	League			Coppa Italia		Europe		Other		Total	
Club	Season	Division	Apps	Goals	Apps	Goals	Apps	Goals	Apps	Goals	Apps	Goals
Potenza	2007–08	Serie C1	7	0	—		—		—		7	0
Juve Stabia	2008–09	Serie C1	29	0	—		—		2	0	31	0
Juve Stabia	2009–10	Serie C2	18	2	—		—		0	0	18	2
Juve Stabia	Total		47	2	—		—		2	0	49	2
Torino	2009–10	Serie B	19	1	—		—		3 (Note: Appearances in Serie B promotion play-offs)	0	22	1
Torino	2010–11	Serie B	30	2	1	0	—		—		31	2
Torino	2011–12	Serie B	26	3	1	0	—		—		27	3
Torino	2012–13	Serie A	28	2	0	0	—		—		28	2
Torino	2013–14	Serie A	14	2	1	0	—		—		15	2
Torino	Total		117	10	3	0	—		3	0	123	10
Inter Milan	2013–14	Serie A	11	0	—		—		—		11	0
Inter Milan	2014–15	Serie A	23	0	1	0	8 (Note: Appearances in UEFA Europa League)	3	—		32	3
Inter Milan	2015–16	Serie A	20	2	3	0	0	0	—		23	2
Inter Milan	2016–17	Serie A	32	3	2	0	5	0	—		39	3
Inter Milan	2017–18	Serie A	34	2	0	0	—		—		34	2
Inter Milan	2018–19	Serie A	30	2	1	0	7 (Note: Four appearances in UEFA Champions League, three appearances in UEFA Europa League)	0	—		38	2
Inter Milan	2019–20	Serie A	22	4	1	0	9 (Note: Three appearances in UEFA Champions League, six appearances and one goal in UEFA Europa League)	1	—		32	5
Inter Milan	2020–21	Serie A	19	3	0	0	5 (Note: Appearances in UEFA Champions League)	0	—		24	3
Inter Milan	2021–22	Serie A	20	1	4	0	3	0	0	0	27	1
Inter Milan	2022–23	Serie A	15	0	3	0	6	0	0	0	24	0
Inter Milan	Total		226	17	15	0	43	4	0	0	284	21
Monza	2023–24	Serie A	24	0	1	1	—		—		25	1
Monza	2024–25	Serie A	20	0	2	0	—		—		22	0
Monza	Total		44	0	3	1	—		—		47	1
Career total			441	29	21	1	43	4	5	0	510	34

=== International ===
Appearances and goals by national team and year
National team	Year	Apps	Goals
Italy	2017	1	0
Italy	2018	1	0
Italy	2019	1	0
Italy	2020	3	0
Total		6	0

== Honours ==
Inter Milan

- Serie A: 2020–21
- Coppa Italia: 2021–22, 2022–23
- Supercoppa Italiana: 2021, 2022
- UEFA Europa League runner-up: 2019–20
- UEFA Champions League runner-up: 2022–23

Individual

- Torino's Revelation of the Year: 2012–13
