= Stefano Sensi =

Italian footballer (born 1995)

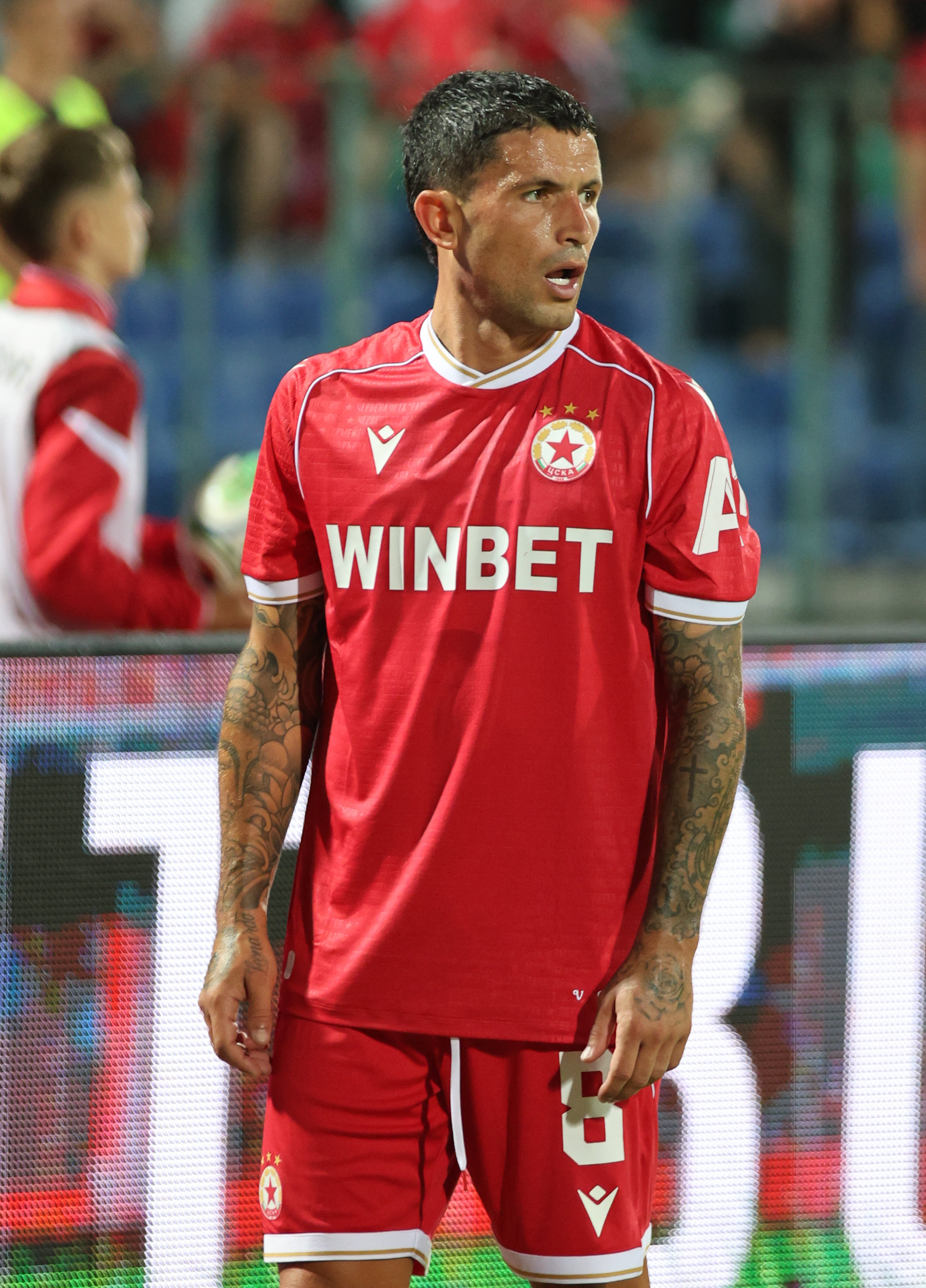
- Sensi with CSKA Sofia in 2026

Personal information
- Date of birth: 5 August 1995 (age 31)
- Place of birth: Urbino, Italy
- Height: 1.68 m (5 ft 6 in)
- Position: Midfielder

Team information
- Current team: CSKA Sofia
- Number: 8

Youth career
- 2001–2007: Urbania
- 2007–2010: Rimini
- 2010–2013: Cesena

Senior career*
Years	Team	Apps	(Gls)
2013–2016	Cesena	17	(3)
2013–2015	→ San Marino (loan)	59	(10)
2016–2020	Sassuolo	61	(5)
2016	→ Cesena (loan)	14	(1)
2019–2020	→ Inter Milan (loan)	12	(3)
2020–2024	Inter Milan	31	(0)
2022	→ Sampdoria (loan)	11	(1)
2022–2023	→ Monza (loan)	28	(3)
2024–2025	Monza	12	(1)
2025–2026	Anorthosis Famagusta	25	(9)
2026–	CSKA Sofia	14	(2)

International career
2012	Italy U17	1	(1)
2015	Italy U20 (Note: The game against Switzerland was not recorded in the FIGC's database.)	3	(0)
2018–2022	Italy	9	(3)
- * Club domestic league appearances and goals as of 17:58, 22 November 2026 (UTC)

Stefano Sensi (Italian pronunciation: [ˈsteːfano ˈsɛnsi]; born 5 August 1995) is an Italian professional footballer who plays as a midfielder for Bulgarian First League club CSKA Sofia.

Sensi began his career with Italian side Cesena in 2013, and was subsequently loaned out to San Marino for two seasons before returning to the club. He joined Sassuolo in January 2016, and was promptly loaned out to Cesena for the remainder of the season. He became a Sassuolo player in summer 2016. Sensi was loaned out to Inter Milan in summer 2019, and joined them on a permanent basis in the following year. Inter loaned him out to Sampdoria and Monza in 2022, with the latter team signing him on a permanent transfer in 2024.

== Club career ==
=== Youth career ===
Born in Urbino in the Marche, Sensi started to play football with the local team Urbania at the age of six. During this time at the club, he played with his older brother. While at Urbania, he was spotted by a Rimini scout, joining the youth team in 2007. He spent three years in Rimini, until the end of the 2009–10 season when the club bankrupted, releasing all the players. Sensi was taken by the youth academy of the local rivals Cesena.

=== Cesena ===
Sensi began his senior career with Cesena. He was first included in a matchday squad for their Coppa Italia fourth-round game on 28 November 2012, remaining unused in a 3–1 loss to Atalanta at the Stadio Atleti Azzurri d'Italia.

On 23 July 2013, he was one of a quintet of Cesena players who moved to San Marino, in his case a loan with the option of co-ownership. He made his professional debut on 8 September, playing the full 90 minutes of a 2–0 Lega Pro Seconda Divisione loss away to Reggiana. A week later he scored his first goal, finishing from the edge of the penalty area to conclude a 2–0 win over Como at the Stadio Olimpico. On 16 March 2014, he was one of three Titani players sent off in a 2–0 defeat at Cremonese. He played 26 games in his first professional season, scoring another goal in the last game, a 2–2 home draw with Vicenza on 4 May.

San Marino did not take up the option to sign Sensi permanently, but on 7 July 2014, he went to the club for a second loan. In his second match of the season, on 8 September, he was sent off in added time at the end of a 2–1 loss at Pontedera. He played 33 games in a season which ended with relegation to Serie D, scoring eight goals, including two in a 3–2 home win over L'Aquila on 14 February 2015, in which he was again sent off at the end.

Sensi made his Cesena debut on 20 August 2015, playing the entirety of their 4–1 win at Catania in the third round of the Coppa Italia. On 5 September, he made his league debut, as the team won 2–0 against Brescia at the Stadio Dino Manuzzi in the first game of the season. On 3 October he scored from a penalty as Cesena defeated Livorno 1–0.

=== Sassuolo ===
On 13 January 2016, Sensi was signed by Serie A club Sassuolo. He would spend the first 6 months of the contract on loan with Cesena. He returned in Sassuolo in July 2016 ahead of 2016–17 season, making his Serie A debut by playing full 90 minutes in the opening championship match against Palermo, which ended in a 1–0 away win. His first top flight goal came later in October 2016 in a 2–1 home win over newly promoted side Crotone. Sensi concluded his first season at the Mapei Stadium by playing 19 matches in all competitions, scoring only once. In the 2017–18 season, he scored two goals in 17 league appearances. Sensi was a key player in the 2018–19 season under manager Roberto De Zerbi, making 30 appearances between league and cup, netting twice in the process.

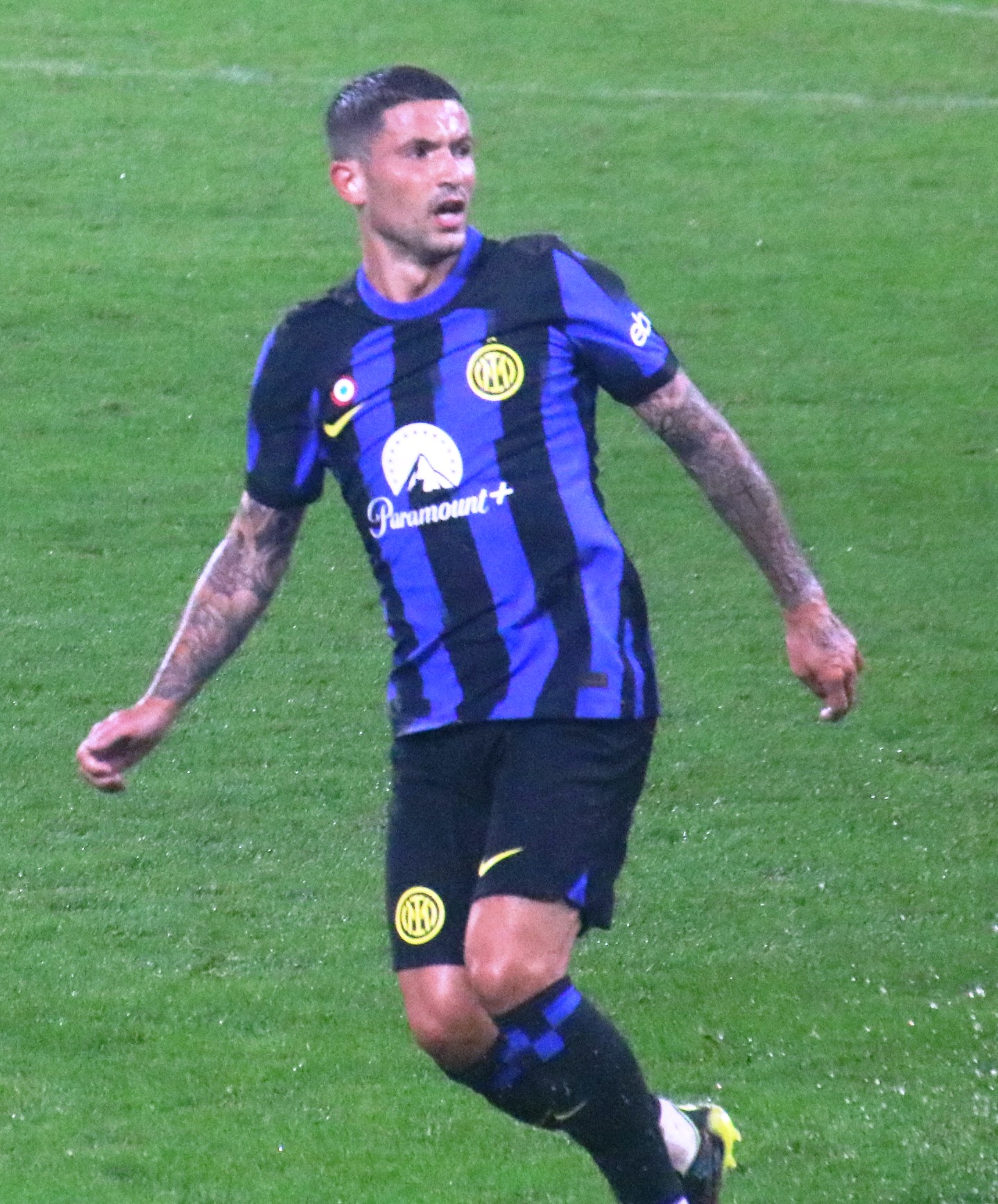

=== Inter Milan ===
On 2 July 2019, Inter Milan officially announced that Stefano Sensi had been signed from Sassuolo on an initial paid loan deal, with an option to buy at the end of the season. The total cost of the operation is expected to reach €25 million. Sensi made his club debut on 26 August in a 4–0 home win against Lecce, in Inter's opening match of the 2019–20 Serie A season; he marked the occasion by scoring a goal, but later came off in the second half for Roberto Gagliardini. Sensi made his Champions League debut on 17 September in a 1–1 home draw against Slavia Prague; he contributed to Inter's injury-time equaliser, as his free kick struck the cross-bar, and was subsequently turned in by Nicolò Barella to tie the game. Starting from January, he picked a series of injuries that effectively ruled him out of the latter half of the 2019–20 season.

On 31 August 2020, Inter exercised the buyout clause in his contract and Sensi signed a four-year deal with the club.

==== Loan to Sampdoria ====
On 29 January 2022, Sensi moved on loan to Sampdoria.

==== Loan to Monza ====
On 2 July 2022, Sensi joined newly promoted Serie A side Monza on a one-year loan. He made his debut on 8 August, as a substitute in a 3–2 Coppa Italia win against Frosinone. Sensi's first goal for the biancorossi came on 11 September, scoring from a direct free kick against Lecce. The match eventually finished in a 1–1 draw, which gave Monza their first-ever Serie A point.

=== Monza ===
After one season at Inter, where he won the 2023–24 Serie A title, Sensi returned to Monza on a permanent transfer on 8 August 2024, signing a one-year contract until 30 June 2025.

=== CSKA Sofia ===
On 24 June 2026, Sensi joined Bulgarian First League club CSKA Sofia signing a two-year contract.

== International career ==
Sensi has represented Italy at youth level, making one appearance for the under-17 side, and making his debut for the under-20 side in a 2–2 draw against Poland on 7 October 2015.

On 20 November 2018, he made his debut with the Italy senior team, playing as a starter in a 1–0 friendly victory over the United States, held in Genk. On 26 March 2019, Sensi scored his first goal for the national team in a 6–0 home win over Liechtenstein in a UEFA Euro 2020 qualifying match.

In June 2021, he was initially included in Italy's final 26-man squad for UEFA Euro 2020 by manager Roberto Mancini; however, he was later ruled out of the tournament after sustaining an injury during training, and Matteo Pessina was called up to the tournament in his place.

== Style of play ==
A former offensive or central midfielder, with noted vision, good technique, and an eye for goal, Sensi now usually functions in a defensive or creative midfield role for his team. He often acts as a deep-lying playmaker in front of the back-line, due to his ball control, range of distribution, and long passing ability with both feet in spite of being naturally right-footed, which allows him to create chances for teammates; he is also capable of playing in several other midfield and offensive positions, and has been deployed as a winger, as a mezzala, or as a supporting forward. His playing style, mobility, small stature, and low centre of gravity have drawn comparisons with Marco Verratti, as well as Andrea Pirlo, although he has personally stated that his main influence is Spanish playmaker Xavi. Sensi has also been praised by Italy manager Roberto Mancini, who described him as: "...good, technically gifted, and fast", also noting that "...he has character." In spite of his slender build, which makes him ineffective at winning more physical challenges for the ball, he is also effective defensively due to his tactical intelligence and interpretation of space. Despite his ability, however, he has often struggled with injuries throughout his career.

== Career statistics ==
=== Club ===
As of match played 22 November 2026

Appearances and goals by club, season and competition
Club	Season	League			Coppa Italia		Europe		Other		Total	
Club	Season	Division	Apps	Goals	Apps	Goals	Apps	Goals	Apps	Goals	Apps	Goals
San Marino (loan)	2013–14	Lega Pro	26	2	—		—		2	0	28	2
San Marino (loan)	2014–15	Lega Pro	33	8	—		—		2	1	35	9
San Marino (loan)	Total		59	10	—		—		4	1	63	11
Cesena	2015–16	Serie B	31	3	1	0	—		1	0	33	3
Sassuolo	2016–17	Serie A	16	1	1	0	2	0	—		19	1
Sassuolo	2017–18	Serie A	17	2	2	0	—		—		19	2
Sassuolo	2018–19	Serie A	28	2	2	0	—		—		30	2
Sassuolo	Total		61	5	5	0	2	0	—		68	5
Inter Milan (loan)	2019–20	Serie A	12	3	3	0	4	0	—		19	3
Inter Milan	2020–21	Serie A	18	0	2	0	1	0	—		21	0
Inter Milan	2021–22	Serie A	9	0	1	1	2	0	0	0	12	1
Inter Milan	2023–24	Serie A	4	0	1	0	0	0	0	0	5	0
Inter Milan	Inter total		43	3	7	1	7	0	0	0	57	4
Sampdoria (loan)	2021–22	Serie A	11	1	—		—		—		11	1
Monza (loan)	2022–23	Serie A	28	3	2	0	—		—		30	3
Monza	2024–25	Serie A	12	1	2	0	—		—		14	1
Monza	Monza total		40	4	4	0	—		—		44	4
Anorthosis Famagusta	2025–26	Cypriot First Division	25	9	2	0	—		—		27	9
CSKA Sofia	2026–27	Bulgarian First League	14	2	0	0	10	1	1	1	24	4
Career total			284	37	18	1	19	1	6	2	327	41

=== International ===
As of match played 29 March 2022

Appearances and goals by national team and year
National team	Year	Apps	Goals
Italy	2018	1	0
Italy	2019	3	1
Italy	2020	2	1
Italy	2021	2	1
Italy	2022	1	0
Total		9	3

Scores and results list Italy's goal tally first, score column indicates score after each Sensi goal.

List of international goals scored by Stefano Sensi
No.	Date	Venue	Opponent	Score	Result	Competition
1	26 March 2019	Stadio Ennio Tardini, Parma, Italy	Liechtenstein	1–0	6–0	UEFA Euro 2020 qualification
2	4 September 2020	Stadio Artemio Franchi, Florence, Italy	Bosnia and Herzegovina	1–1	1–1	2020–21 UEFA Nations League A
3	31 March 2021	LFF Stadium, Vilnius, Lithuania	Lithuania	1–0	2–0	2022 FIFA World Cup qualification

== Honours ==
Inter Milan

- Serie A: 2020–21, 2023–24
- Supercoppa Italiana: 2021, 2023
- UEFA Europa League runner-up: 2019–20

CSKA Sofia

- Bulgarian Supercup: 2026
