= 2021 Supercoppa Italiana =

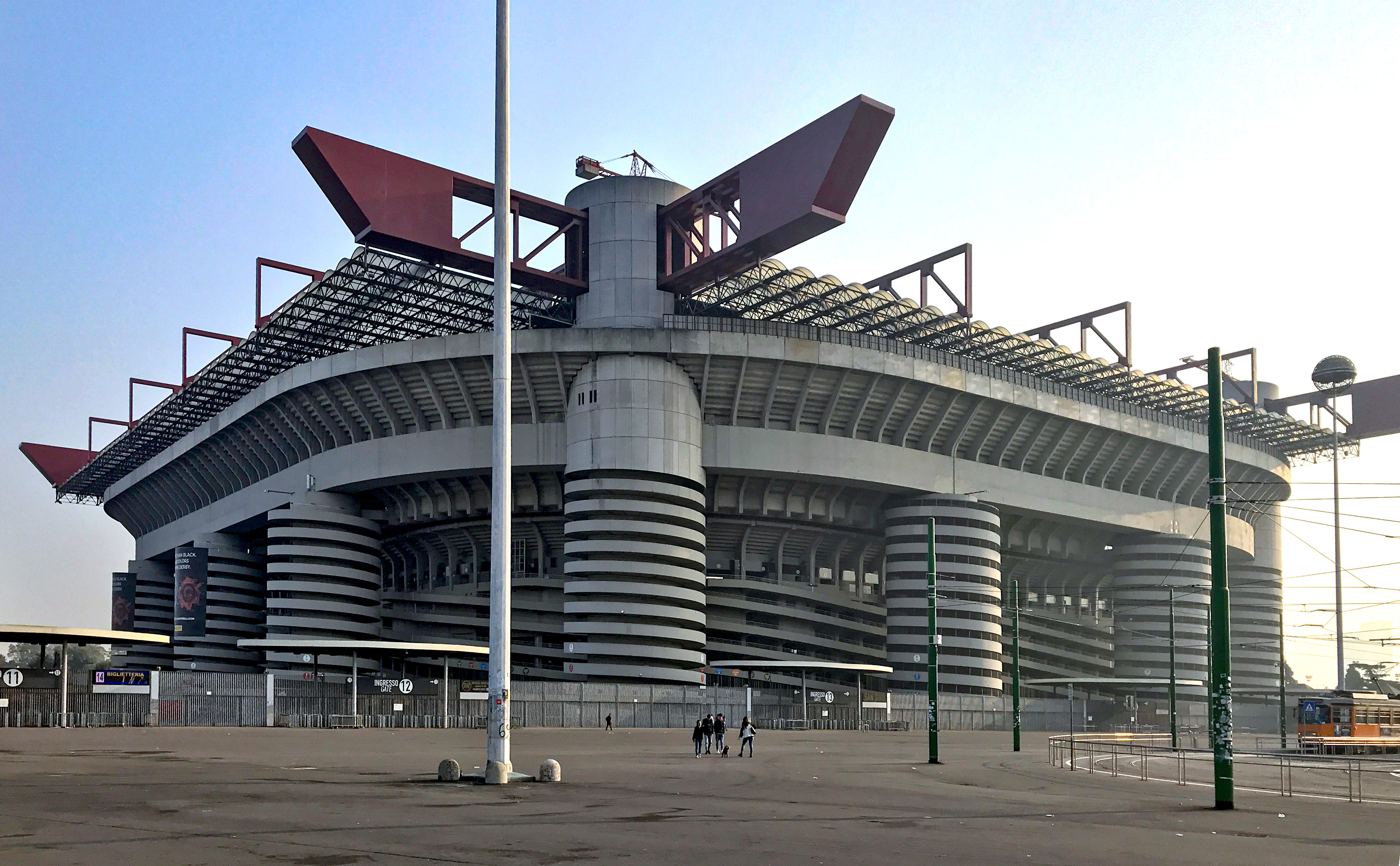
- The San Siro in Milan hosted the final.
- Event: Supercoppa Italiana
Inter Milan	Juventus
Serie A	Coppa Italia
2	1
- After extra time
- Date: 12 January 2022
- Venue: San Siro, Milan
- Man of the Match: Alexis Sánchez (Inter Milan)
- Referee: Daniele Doveri
- Attendance: 29,696 (Note: The total capacity of the stadium was established at 50% due to the COVID-19 pandemic in Italy.)

The 2021 Supercoppa Italiana (branded as the Supercoppa Frecciarossa for sponsorship reasons) was the 34th edition of the Supercoppa Italiana. It was played between Inter Milan, winners of the 2020–21 Serie A championship, and Juventus, winners of the 2020–21 Coppa Italia. On 11 November 2021, it was announced that the match would be played on 12 January 2022 at San Siro, Milan.

Inter Milan won the match 2–1 after extra time for their sixth Supercoppa Italiana title.

== Background ==
This was the second Derby d'Italia in the Supercoppa Italiana, as the two teams had already met in the 2005 edition where Inter Milan won 1–0 after extra time. Inter Milan made their tenth Supercoppa Italiana appearance, and first since 2011 when they lost to city rivals AC Milan. Before the match, they had a 5–4 record in the Supercoppa Italiana. Juventus made their tenth consecutive appearance, and 17th overall. They had a 5–4 Supercoppa Italiana record during this run, and were 9–7 overall.

== Match ==
=== Details ===
12 January 2022
21:00 CET

Inter Milan	2–1 (a.e.t.)	Juventus
Martínez 35' (pen.); Sánchez 120+1'	Report	McKennie 25'

San Siro, Milan
Attendance: 29,696
Referee: Daniele Doveri

Inter Milan	Juventus

GK	1	(Slovenia) Samir Handanović (c)
CB	37	(Slovakia) Milan Škriniar
CB	6	(Netherlands) Stefan de Vrij
CB	95	(Italy) Alessandro Bastoni
RM	2	(Netherlands) Denzel Dumfries		(substituted off) 89'
CM	23	(Italy) Nicolò Barella		(substituted off) 89'
CM	77	(Croatia) Marcelo Brozović
CM	20	(Turkey) Hakan Çalhanoğlu
LM	14	(Croatia) Ivan Perišić		(substituted off) 100'
CF	9	(Bosnia and Herzegovina) Edin Džeko	(yellow card) 60'	(substituted off) 75'
CF	10	(Argentina) Lautaro Martínez		(substituted off) 75'
Substitutes:
GK	97	(Romania) Ionuț Radu
DF	11	(Serbia) Aleksandar Kolarov
DF	13	(Italy) Andrea Ranocchia
DF	32	(Italy) Federico Dimarco		(substituted on) 100'
DF	33	(Italy) Danilo D'Ambrosio
DF	36	(Italy) Matteo Darmian		(substituted on) 89'
MF	5	(Italy) Roberto Gagliardini
MF	8	(Uruguay) Matías Vecino
MF	12	(Italy) Stefano Sensi
MF	22	(Chile) Arturo Vidal	(yellow card) 118'	(substituted on) 89'
FW	7	(Chile) Alexis Sánchez		(substituted on) 75'
FW	19	(Argentina) Joaquín Correa	(yellow card) 106'	(substituted on) 75'
Manager:
(Italy) Simone Inzaghi

GK	36	(Italy) Mattia Perin
RB	2	(Italy) Mattia De Sciglio
CB	24	(Italy) Daniele Rugani	(yellow card) 109'
CB	3	(Italy) Giorgio Chiellini (c)
LB	12	(Brazil) Alex Sandro
CM	14	(United States) Weston McKennie
CM	27	(Italy) Manuel Locatelli		(substituted off) 91'
CM	25	(France) Adrien Rabiot
RF	44	(Sweden) Dejan Kulusevski		(substituted off) 74'
CF	9	(Spain) Álvaro Morata		(substituted off) 88'
LF	20	(Italy) Federico Bernardeschi	(yellow card) 43'	(substituted off) 79'
Substitutes:
GK	1	(Poland) Wojciech Szczęsny
GK	23	(Italy) Carlo Pinsoglio
DF	6	(Brazil) Danilo
DF	17	(Italy) Luca Pellegrini
DF	19	(Italy) Leonardo Bonucci
DF	45	(Belgium) Koni De Winter
MF	5	(Brazil) Arthur		(substituted on) 79'
MF	30	(Uruguay) Rodrigo Bentancur		(substituted on) 91'
FW	10	(Argentina) Paulo Dybala	(yellow card) 105'	(substituted on) 74'
FW	18	(Italy) Moise Kean		(substituted on) 88'
FW	21	(Brazil) Kaio Jorge
FW	38	(France) Marley Aké
Manager:
(Italy) Massimiliano Allegri

Man of the Match:
Alexis Sánchez (Inter Milan)

Assistant referees:
Daniele Bindoni
Davide Imperiale
Fourth official:
Michael Fabbri
Reserve assistant referee:
Salvatore Longo
Video assistant referee:
Paolo Silvio Mazzoleni
Assistant video assistant referee:
Sergio Ranghetti

Match rules

- 90 minutes.
- 30 minutes of extra time if necessary.
- Penalty shoot-out if scores still level.
- Maximum of twelve named substitutes.
- Maximum of five substitutions, with a sixth allowed in extra time. (Note: Each team was given only three opportunities to make substitutions, excluding substitutions made at half-time, before the start of extra time and at half-time in extra time.)

== See also ==
- 2021–22 Serie A
- 2021–22 Coppa Italia
- 2021–22 Inter Milan season
- 2021–22 Juventus FC season
