= Ionuț Radu =

Romanian footballer (born 1997)

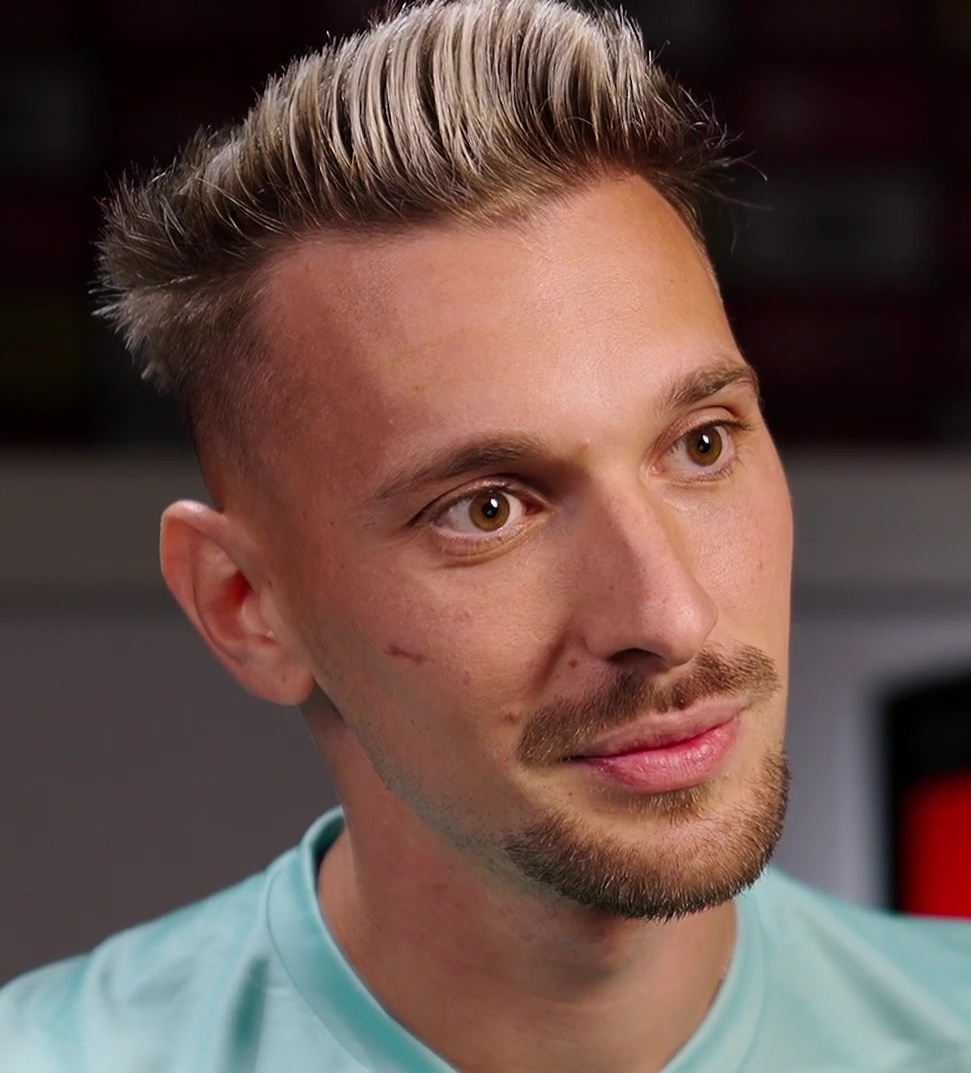
- Radu with AFC Bournemouth in 2023

Personal information
- Full name: Ionuț Andrei Radu
- Date of birth: 28 May 1997 (age 29)
- Place of birth: Bucharest, Romania
- Height: 1.88 m (6 ft 2 in)
- Position: Goalkeeper

Team information
- Current team: Celta Vigo
- Number: 13

Youth career
- 2005–2008: Viitorul București
- 2008–2012: Steaua București
- 2012–2013: Dinamo București
- 2013: Pergolettese
- 2013–2017: Inter Milan

Senior career*
Years	Team	Apps	(Gls)
2015–2025	Inter Milan	4	(0)
2017–2018	→ Avellino (loan)	22	(0)
2018–2020	→ Genoa (loan)	50	(0)
2020	→ Parma (loan)	0	(0)
2022–2023	→ Cremonese (loan)	9	(0)
2023	→ Auxerre (loan)	17	(0)
2023–2024	→ Bournemouth (loan)	2	(0)
2025	Venezia	15	(0)
2025–	Celta Vigo	51	(0)

International career^{‡}
2017–2019	Romania U21	17	(0)
2022–	Romania	11	(0)
- * Club domestic league appearances and goals as of 22 November 2026 ‡ National team caps and goals as of 28 September 2026

Ionuț Andrei Radu (Romanian pronunciation: [joˈnuts anˈdrej ˈradu]; born 28 May 1997) is a Romanian professional footballer who plays as a goalkeeper for La Liga club Celta Vigo and the Romania national team.

Radu began his professional career at Inter Milan, his senior output during his first stint consisting of only one match. He was loaned to Avellino in 2017, and the following year joined Genoa also on loan but with an obligation to buy. In the summer of 2019, the Nerazzurri activated his buy-back clause before loaning him again to the latter club and then to Parma, Cremonese, Auxerre, and AFC Bournemouth, respectively. In January 2025, Radu was sold to Venezia. He left the team after half a year to join Celta Vigo.

In international football, Radu led Romania under-21 to the semi-finals of the UEFA Euro 2019 as their captain, and as a result was awarded the Romanian Footballer of the Year trophy. He then made his full debut for the country in September 2022, in a 1–1 Nations League draw with Finland.

== Club career ==
=== Early career / Inter Milan ===
Radu began playing football at age eight with local Viitorul București, after his grandmother read a newspaper announcement. He was transferred to Steaua București in 2008, and left the club for rival side Dinamo București three years later. In 2013, he relocated to Italy by briefly joining Pergolettese at the start of the year, and then being assigned to Inter Milan's junior squads in the summer.

On 14 May 2016, during the last matchday of the campaign, Radu made his senior debut for Inter by entering as a 72nd-minute substitute for Juan Pablo Carrizo in a 3–1 Serie A away defeat to Sassuolo. On 4 October that year, he penned down a new four-season deal with the Nerazzurri which would have run until June 2020.

Radu agreed to a one-year loan at Serie B club Avellino, with an option to buy on 15 July 2017. He made his debut in the second round of the Coppa Italia, a 1–0 home win over Matera on 6 August. On 18 September, he made his Serie B debut in a 1–1 home draw with Venezia, and on 24 October kept his first clean sheet in a 1–0 home win over Pro Vercelli. Radu ended his loan with the Biancoverdi with 24 appearances, five clean sheets and 30 conceded goals.

=== Genoa ===
==== 2018–2019: Breakthrough season ====
On 29 June 2018, 21-year-old Radu was loaned to Genoa with an obligation to join them on a full transfer the following season. Genoa Chairman Enrico Preziosi claimed the subsequent fee was €9 million, which made Radu the most expensive Romanian goalkeeper, while the financial report of Inter showed €8 million. The deal also included an undisclosed buy-back clause.

After Federico Marchetti was used as a starter in the first four games of the 2018–19 season, Radu made his debut on 26 September against Chievo in the Serie A, managing to keep a clean sheet in the 2–0 victory. He was deemed at fault for several goals his team conceded in the next fixtures, including Cristiano Ronaldo's opener in a 1–1 draw with Juventus on 20 October and Alessio Romagnoli's late volley in a 2–1 loss to Milan on the 31st of the same month; he was however encouraged by manager Ivan Jurić, who blamed young age as the source of his errors. On 3 November, he conceded five goals in a loss to his parent club Inter.

Radu was nominated for Gazeta Sporturilor's 2018 Romanian Footballer of the Year award in late November. On 22 December, he saved one of the two penalty kicks awarded to Atalanta in a 3–1 home victory at the Stadio Luigi Ferraris. In January 2019, he was included by UEFA.com in a list of the 50 Best Young Footballers to watch for that year. Radu managed to stay the first-choice goalkeeper under three managers, and amassed 33 league appearances throughout the season.

==== 2019–2020: Return and fall out of favour ====
In June 2019, after Genoa paid the transfer fee for Radu's permanent move, he was immediately bought back by Inter Milan for €12 million. He however continued at Genoa on another loan.

In December, Radu was announced as the recipient of the 2019 Romanian Footballer of the Year award by the Gazeta Sporturilor daily. He appeared in 17 Serie A games, before leaving Genoa in the 2020 winter transfer window, as a result of some unconvincing performances.

=== Return to Inter Milan ===
Inter Milan loaned Radu out to Parma for the remainder of the 2019–20 season, but he did not play in any games during his stint at the Stadio Ennio Tardini. The next campaign, he appeared in two Serie A matches for Inter, as they became national champions of Italy for the first time in eleven years.

In a rare start on 27 April 2022, Radu committed an error which allowed Nicola Sansone to score the winner in a 2–1 league loss to Bologna. That result dropped Inter to second place in the table, where they remained for the rest of the season behind eventual champions Milan.

==== Various loans ====
On 8 July 2022, Radu joined Cremonese on a season-long loan. On 25 January 2023, he moved on a new loan to Auxerre in France.

On 27 July 2023, Premier League side Bournemouth announced the signing of Radu from Inter on a season long-loan, with a future option to make the move permanent.

=== Venezia ===
On 3 February 2025, Radu joined Serie A club Venezia on a five-month contract. Since debuting on 9 February after first-choice Filip Stanković's season ending injury, he kept four clean sheets and won three consecutive player-of-the-match awards.

=== Celta Vigo ===
On 9 June 2025, La Liga club Celta Vigo announced the signing of Radu on a contract for the next four seasons.

== International career ==
Radu is a former Romania youth international at under-21 level, featuring for the side in the 2019 UEFA European Championship qualifiers. He made his debut on 13 June 2017, in a 2–0 away win over Liechtenstein. Radu captained both of the group matches in September 2018, saving a penalty to preserve a win against Portugal and keeping a clean sheet in a victory over Bosnia and Herzegovina. The following month, Tricolorii mici finished on top of the group and qualified for the final tournament.

In May 2019, Radu was called up to the Romania senior squad for the approaching UEFA Euro 2020 qualifiers against Norway and Malta, but was not handed his full debut. In June, he started in all three group fixtures of the UEFA Under-21 Euro in Italy, keeping a clean sheet in a draw against France which secured the first place for his nation. Romania were eventually eliminated by defending champions Germany in the semi-finals, after a 4–2 loss.

== Personal life ==
Radu had an elder sister, who died in 2006 at age 14; he used to wear a t-shirt with a picture of her under the kit during the time he was a junior. He is the cousin of defender Andrei Radu, with whom he shares the same name.

== Career statistics ==
=== Club ===
As of match played 22 November 2026

Appearances and goals by club, season and competition
Club	Season	League			National cup (Note: Includes Coppa Italia)		Europe		Other		Total	
Club	Season	Division	Apps	Goals	Apps	Goals	Apps	Goals	Apps	Goals	Apps	Goals
Inter Milan	2015–16	Serie A	1	0	0	0	—		—		1	0
Inter Milan	2016–17	Serie A	0	0	0	0	0	0	—		0	0
Inter Milan	2020–21	Serie A	2	0	0	0	0	0	—		2	0
Inter Milan	2021–22	Serie A	1	0	1	0	0	0	0	0	2	0
Inter Milan	Total		4	0	1	0	0	0	0	0	5	0
Avellino (loan)	2017–18	Serie B	22	0	2	0	—		—		24	0
Genoa (loan)	2018–19	Serie A	33	0	0	0	—		—		33	0
Genoa (loan)	2019–20	Serie A	17	0	2	0	—		—		19	0
Genoa (loan)	Total		50	0	2	0	—		—		52	0
Parma (loan)	2019–20	Serie A	0	0	—		—		—		0	0
Cremonese (loan)	2022–23	Serie A	9	0	1	0	—		—		10	0
Auxerre (loan)	2022–23	Ligue 1	17	0	0	0	—		—		17	0
Bournemouth (loan)	2023–24	Premier League	2	0	0	0	—		3 (Note: Appearances in League Cup)	0	5	0
Venezia	2024–25	Serie A	15	0	—		—		—		15	0
Celta Vigo	2025–26	La Liga	38	0	0	0	12 (Note: Appearances in UEFA Europa League)	0	—		50	0
Celta Vigo	2026–27	La Liga	13	0	0	0	4	0	—		17	0
Celta Vigo	Total		51	0	0	0	16	0	—		67	0
Career total			170	0	6	0	16	0	3	0	195	0

=== International ===
As of match played 28 September 2026

Appearances and goals by national team and year
National team	Year	Apps	Goals
Romania
Romania	2022	2	0
Romania	2023	2	0
Romania	2024	0	0
Romania	2025	3	0
Romania	2026	4	0
Total		11	0

== Honours ==
Inter Milan

- Serie A: 2020–21
- Coppa Italia: 2021–22
- Supercoppa Italiana: 2021

Individual

- Gazeta Sporturilor Romanian Footballer of the Year: 2019
