= Francesco Nunziatini =

Italian footballer (born 2003)

Personal information
- Date of birth: 15 March 2003 (age 23)
- Place of birth: Grosseto, Italy
- Height: 1.84 m (6 ft 0 in)
- Position: Midfielder

Team information
- Current team: Torres
- Number: 6

Youth career
- –2020: Livorno
- 2021–2022: Inter Milan

Senior career*
| Years | Team | Apps | (Gls) |
| 2020–2021 | Livorno | 17 | (0) |
| 2021–2024 | Inter Milan | 0 | (0) |
| 2022–2023 | → San Donato (loan) | 18 | (0) |
| 2023–2024 | → Torres (loan) | 9 | (0) |
| 2024– | Torres | 21 | (1) |
| 2024–2025 | → Sestri Levante (loan) | 28 | (1) |
- * Club domestic league appearances and goals as of 30 April 2026

Francesco Nunziatini (born 15 March 2003) is an Italian professional footballer who plays as a midfielder for Serie C Group B club Torres.

== Club career ==
On 8 July 2021, he moved to Inter Milan and was assigned to their Under-19 squad.

On 22 July 2022, Nunziatini joined Serie C club San Donato Tavarnelle on a season-long loan.

On 28 July 2023, Nunziatini joined Serie C club Torres on a season-long loan.

On 17 July 2024, Nunziatini returned to Torres on permanent basis. On 30 August 2024, he was loaned to Sestri Levante.

== Club statistics ==
=== Club ===
As of 23 December 2022.

| Club | Season | League | | | Cup | | Other | | Total | |
| Club | Season | Division | Apps | Goals | Apps | Goals | Apps | Goals | Apps | Goals |
|---|---|---|---|---|---|---|---|---|---|---|
| Livorno | 2019–20 | Serie B | 3 | 0 | 0 | 0 | 0 | 0 | 3 | 0 |
| Livorno | 2020–21 | Serie C | 14 | 0 | 0 | 0 | 0 | 0 | 14 | 0 |
| Livorno | Total | | 17 | 0 | 0 | 0 | 0 | 0 | 17 | 0 |
| Inter Milan | 2021–22 | Serie A | 0 | 0 | 0 | 0 | 0 | 0 | 0 | 0 |
| San Donato (loan) | 2022–23 | Serie C | 18 | 0 | 0 | 0 | 0 | 0 | 18 | 0 |
| Career total | | | 35 | 0 | 0 | 0 | 0 | 0 | 35 | 0 |
