= Jacopo Gianelli =

Italian footballer

Personal information
- Date of birth: 4 March 2001 (age 25)
- Place of birth: Magenta, Italy
- Height: 1.84 m (6 ft 0 in)
- Position: Midfielder

Team information
- Current team: Ancona

Youth career
- Cremonese Giovanili
- 2017–2020: Inter Milan

Senior career*
Years	Team	Apps	(Gls)
2020–2024	Inter Milan	0	(0)
2020–2022	→ Pro Sesto (loan)	9	(0)
2023–2024	→ Fermana (loan)	20	(0)
2024–	Ancona	0	(0)

International career^{‡}
2019	Italy U19	1	(0)
- * Club domestic league appearances and goals as of 4 May 2024 ‡ National team caps and goals as of 18:04, 21 July 2021 (UTC)

Jacopo Gianelli (born 4 March 2001) is an Italian professional footballer who plays as a midfielder for Serie D club Ancona.

== Career statistics ==
=== Club ===
As of 10 October 2021.

Appearances and goals by club, season and competition
Club	Season	League			Cup		Other		Total	
Club	Season	Division	Apps	Goals	Apps	Goals	Apps	Goals	Apps	Goals
Pro Sesto (loan)	2020–21	Serie C	4	0	0	0	—		4	0
Pro Sesto (loan)	2021–22	Serie C	5	0	1	0	—		6	0
Pro Sesto (loan)	Total		9	0	1	0	—		10	0
Career total			9	0	1	0	—		10	0
