= Andrea Ranocchia =

Italian footballer (born 1988)

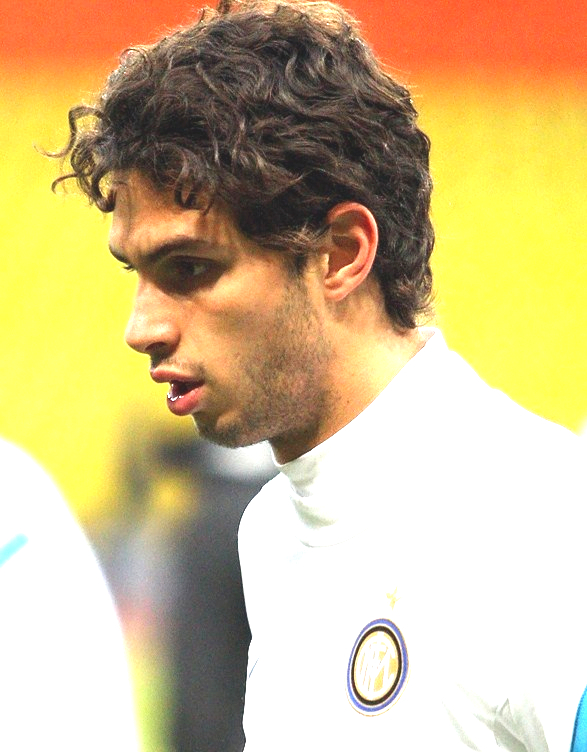
- Ranocchia with Inter Milan in 2011

Personal information
- Full name: Andrea Ranocchia
- Date of birth: 16 February 1988 (age 38)
- Place of birth: Assisi, Italy
- Height: 1.95 m (6 ft 5 in)
- Position: Centre back

Youth career
- 1998–2004: Perugia

Senior career*
Years	Team	Apps	(Gls)
2006–2008	Arezzo	56	(1)
2008–2010	Genoa	0	(0)
2008–2010	→ Bari (loan)	34	(3)
2010–2022	Inter Milan	170	(9)
2010–2011	→ Genoa (loan)	16	(2)
2016	→ Sampdoria (loan)	14	(0)
2017	→ Hull City (loan)	16	(2)
2022	Monza	1	(0)
Total		307	(17)

International career
2007	Italy U20	3	(0)
2007–2010	Italy U21	13	(2)
2010–2016	Italy	21	(0)
- * Club domestic league appearances and goals

Andrea Ranocchia (Italian pronunciation: [anˈdrɛːa raˈnɔkkja]; born 16 February 1988) is an Italian former professional footballer who played as a defender.

== Club career ==
=== Early career ===
Born in Assisi in the province of Perugia, Ranocchia started his career at Perugia then in Arezzo. Ranocchia played for Arezzo's Primavera team in 2005–06 season. He made his professional debut with the Arezzo senior side in Serie B under manager Antonio Conte during the 2006–07 season.

=== Genoa ===
==== Loan to Bari ====
In August 2008, Genoa purchased half of the registration rights of Ranocchia for €1.55 million and sent him on loan to Bari, rejoining Arezzo coach Conte, where he won the Serie B Championship, obtaining promotion to Serie A the following season, and forming a promising defensive partnership with fellow emerging Italian centre-back Leonardo Bonucci. On 26 June 2009 Genoa signed him outright for another €2.45 million from Arezzo; Genoa paid €4 million in total for him within a year.

==== Return to Genoa ====
On 1 July 2010, he moved back to Genoa. After a link with Inter Milan in February 2010, the clubs agreed a deal in June 2010 which involved the transfer of young striker Mattia Destro. The transfer became official on 20 July 2010, which Inter signed half of the registration rights of Ranocchia for €6.5 million and sent Destro on loan to Genoa with option to sign him in co-ownership deal (who later purchased outright for €4.5 million). Ranocchia also loaned back to Genoa for a season.

=== Inter Milan ===
On 27 December 2010, Inter bought the remaining 50% registration rights of Ranocchia from Genoa for €12.5 million, valuing him at €19 million in total, which was later confirmed by Genoa chairman Enrico Preziosi who expressed his delight at doing business with Inter. The chairman of Inter, Massimo Moratti, spoke on the transfer to Sky Italia and said: "Finally an Italian. We had kept an eye on him from before. It is our project to go ahead with young players." On 9 January 2011, Ranocchia made his Inter debut in a 2–1 win over Catania in Serie A. He made his Champions League debut against Bayern Munich in the first leg of the round of 16; Inter eventually progressed to the quarter-finals where they were eliminated by eventual semi-finalists Schalke 04. Ranocchia completed his first season with Inter by attaining a second-place finish in Serie A, also winning the 2010–11 Coppa Italia; the following season, however, Inter lost out to Serie A Champions and cross-city rivals Milan in the 2011 Supercoppa Italiana Final.

Ranocchia was appointed as the new Inter captain ahead of the 2014–15 season, replacing the retired Javier Zanetti. On 30 June 2015 Inter announced that Ranocchia agreed to a four-year contract extension, keeping him with the club until 2019. During the 2014–15 season, Ranocchia made a total of 42 appearances and scored two goals, but was replaced as the club's captain by the young striker Mauro Icardi at the end of the season.

During the 2015–16, Ranocchia's role was downgraded to that of a substitute under Roberto Mancini, which saw him make only 10 appearances during the first half of the season, mostly as a substitute. Since 2015, he has mainly been used as a back-up, playing seven to 13 games per season. On 28 January 2016, Ranocchia moved on loan to Sampdoria. On 31 January 2017, Ranocchia moved on loan to Hull City until the end of the 2016–17 season. He made his debut the following day when he came off the bench as a 66-minute substitute for Josh Tymon in a 0–0 away draw against Manchester United. He scored his first goal for the club on 1 April 2017 as Hull beat West Ham United 2–1 at the KCOM Stadium. At the end of season, Ranocchia returned to Inter. He was part of the squad on the first day of pre-season training.

In the 2017–18 season, under guidance of Luciano Spalletti, Ranocchia was once again used rarely, making only 13 appearances between league and cup, scoring twice in the process. His contribution during this season helped Inter return to UEFA Champions League for the first time since 2011–12 season.

In the following season, Ranocchia played only 7 matches across all competitions, although he scored his first goal in European competitions; his goal came with a volley outsite the penalty area in a 4–0 home win over Rapid Wien in Europa League on 21 February 2019.

On 29 April 2019, Ranocchia's contract with Inter was extended to 2021. Moreover, he reunited with his first coach in senior professional football, Antonio Conte, who was appointed manager of Inter ahead of the 2019–20 season. Although he was initially used as a starter for the first two games of the season, even earning praise in the media over his performances, he was once again relegated to the bench as the season progressed. However, he was given an opportunity to start on 20 February 2020, during which he made his 200th Inter appearance in all competitions by captaining the team in a 2–0 win at Ludogorets Razgrad in the first leg of the round of 32 of the Europa League.

During the 2020–21 season, Ranocchia won his first scudetto with Inter; although he did not make many appearances for the club, he took on a crucial leadership role for the team within the dressing room.

=== Monza ===
On 21 June 2022, Ranocchia signed a two-year deal with newly-promoted Serie A side Monza; he became the side's first acquisition as a Serie A team. He made his debut on 8 August, in a 3–2 Coppa Italia win against Frosinone. On 21 September, only three months after having been signed, Ranocchia terminated his contract with Monza on mutual consent. He eventually retired on 22 September 2022.

== International career ==
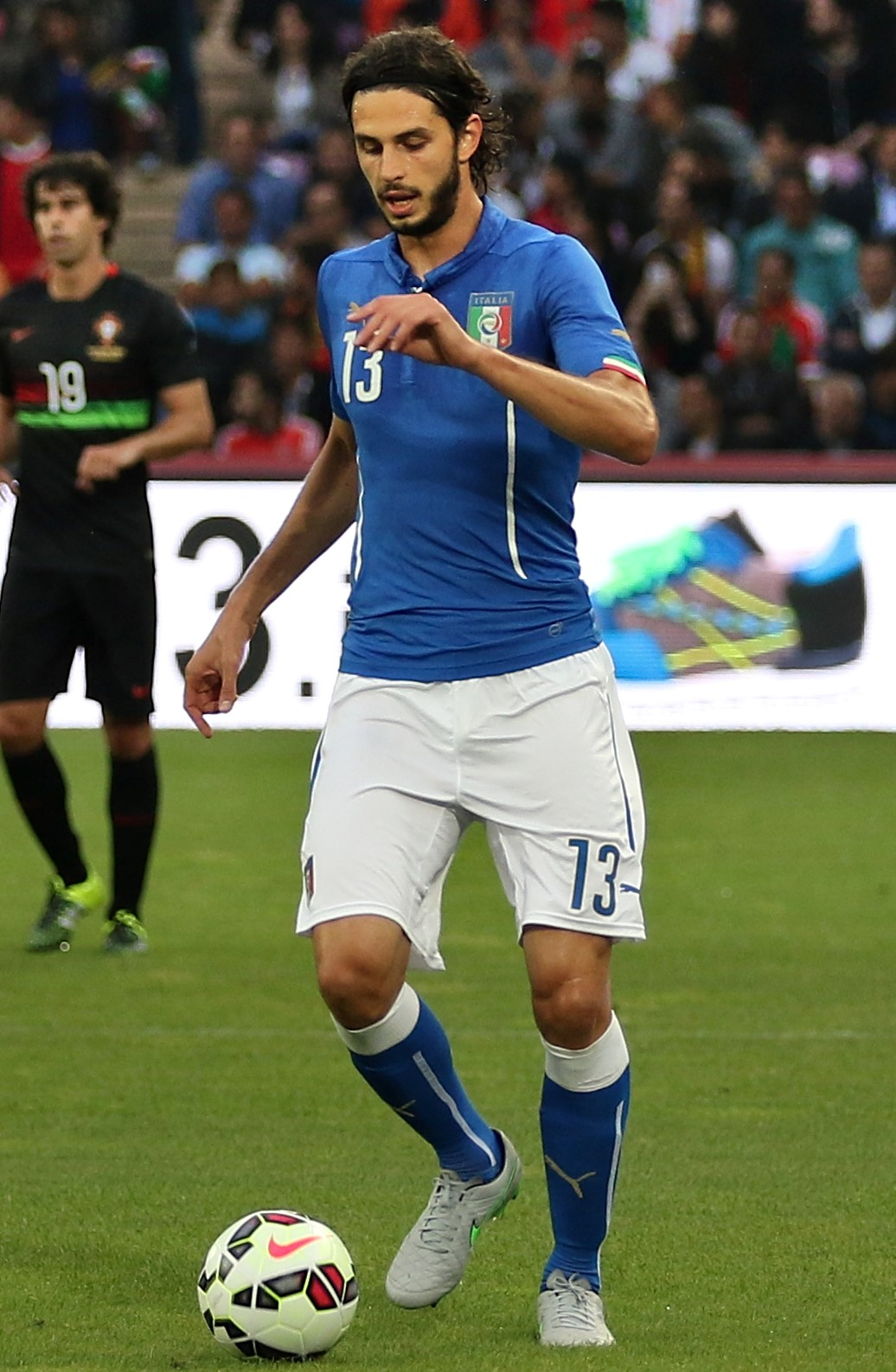
Ranocchia playing for Italy in 2015

On 21 August 2007, he made his debut with the Italy U21 squad in a friendly match against France, replacing Fabiano Santacroce. He took part at the 2009 U-21 Championship, where the Italy under-21 side reached the semi-finals, only to be defeated by eventual champions Germany.

He made his debut with the Italy senior team on 17 November 2010, in a friendly match against Romania, which ended in a 1–1 draw.

Ranocchia was named to Cesare Prandelli's 32 and 25-man provisional squads for UEFA Euro 2012, but was excluded from the final 23-man squad.

Ranocchia was later also included in Prandelli's 30-man provisional squad for the 2014 FIFA World Cup, but not the final 23-man squad; however, he was one of the two Italian reserve players alongside Antonio Mirante who was kept on the standby list prior to the start of the competition, as a precaution, in case of injury to any of the squad's final players, following an injury scare to back-up goalkeeper Salvatore Sirigu.

Under Prandelli's successor, Antonio Conte, Ranocchia was called up for Italy's Euro 2016 qualifying matches in August 2015.

== Style of play ==
Ranocchia has been described as a large, strong, aggressive, and physically imposing centre back, with good tactical knowledge and concentration, as well as an ability to read the game and time his tackles well. He predominantly drew praise for his aerial ability, making him a goal threat from set pieces, and former Inter centre back Marco Materazzi described Ranocchia as his heir due to his own aerial prowess. A former attacking midfielder, he was also known for being comfortable in possession due to his solid technique and reliable distribution, which allowed to him to play the ball out from the back or carry it out from the defence; these qualities initially led him to be compared to Alessandro Nesta in the Italian media, a player whom he admired. He was capable of playing in any position in a three–man defence, or as part of a central defensive partnership in a four–man back-line, although he was more suited to the former system; he was also occasionally used as a full-back on either side of the pitch.

Regarded as one of the most promising Italian defenders of his generation in his youth, Ranocchia was regarded as one of the best defenders in Serie A in his early career, even winning the Premio Armando Picchi in 2011, which is awarded to the best Italian under-23 defender in Italy, and pertains to playing ability as well as personality and fair-play. Former Inter full-back and captain Javier Zanetti also praised Ranocchia for his leadership, which eventually saw him inherit the role of club captain in 2014. In February 2019, Inter manager Luciano Spalletti praised his leadership, stating: "Ranocchia is the real captain because he is the one who speaks often, whose messages on social media everyone gets. He is the leader that is in the squad but you don’t notice him, but during the difficult times steps out and says what needs to be said.”

Despite his reputation as a generally reliable defender, in later seasons, Ranocchia did, however, draw criticism due to his decision making, inconsistency, and proneness to errors when under pressure, as well as his lack of pace, while his fitness was also affected by several injuries. As such, he was accused by some pundits in the Italian media of failing to live up to his initial potential. Moreover, despite his leadership, dedication, and professionalism, he was also criticised for his mentality, as well as his lack of a strong character or personality, which was thought to have limited his development as a player, and to have been one of the reasons behind his increasing lack of first team appearances as his career progressed.

Aside from his regular position of central defender, Ranocchia played several times as a makeshift target forward when his team lacked attacking options, a position which utilised his height, physical strength, and heading ability in attempts to either score goals or create goalscoring opportunities for his teammates. He had also initially played as a forward in his youth, due to his speed, technique, and height, before being shifted further back as he grew physically with age.

== Career statistics ==
=== Club ===
Appearances and goals by club, season and competition
Club	Season	League			National cup (Note: Includes Coppa Italia, FA Cup)		Europe		Other		Total	
Club	Season	Division	Apps	Goals	Apps	Goals	Apps	Goals	Apps	Goals	Apps	Goals
Arezzo	2006–07	Serie B	24	1	5	1	—		—		29	2
Arezzo	2007–08	Serie C1	32	0	—		—		—		32	0
Arezzo	Total		56	1	5	1	—		—		61	2
Bari (loan)	2008–09	Serie B	17	1	0	0	—		—		17	1
Bari (loan)	2009–10	Serie A	17	2	1	0	—		—		18	2
Bari (loan)	Total		34	3	1	0	—		—		35	3
Genoa	2010–11	Serie A	16	2	1	0	—		—		17	2
Inter Milan	2010–11	Serie A	18	1	4	0	4 (Note: All appearances in UEFA Champions League)	0	0	0	26	1
Inter Milan	2011–12	Serie A	12	1	2	0	2	0	1 (Note: Appearance in Supercoppa Italiana)	0	17	1
Inter Milan	2012–13	Serie A	32	2	3	1	10 (Note: All appearances in UEFA Europa League)	0	—		45	3
Inter Milan	2013–14	Serie A	24	1	2	1	—		—		26	2
Inter Milan	2014–15	Serie A	33	2	1	0	8	0	—		42	2
Inter Milan	2015–16	Serie A	10	0	0	0	—		—		10	0
Inter Milan	2016–17	Serie A	5	0	0	0	4	0	—		9	0
Inter Milan	2017–18	Serie A	11	2	2	0	—		—		13	2
Inter Milan	2018–19	Serie A	4	0	1	0	2	1	—		7	1
Inter Milan	2019–20	Serie A	7	0	3	1	2	0	—		12	1
Inter Milan	2020–21	Serie A	8	0	1	0	0	0	—		9	0
Inter Milan	2021–22	Serie A	6	0	1	1	3	0	0	0	10	1
Inter Milan	Total		170	9	20	4	35	1	1	0	226	14
Sampdoria (loan)	2015–16	Serie A	14	0	0	0	—		—		14	0
Hull City (loan)	2016–17	Premier League	16	2	0	0	—		—		16	2
Monza	2022–23	Serie A	1	0	1	0	—		—		2	0
Career total			307	17	28	5	35	1	1	0	371	23

=== International ===
Appearances and goals by national team and year
National team	Year	Apps	Goals
Italy	2010	1	0
Italy	2011	7	0
Italy	2012	0	0
Italy	2013	4	0
Italy	2014	5	0
Italy	2015	3	0
Italy	2016	1	0
Total		21	0

== Honours ==
Bari

- Serie B: 2008–09

Inter Milan

- Serie A: 2020–21
- Coppa Italia: 2010–11, 2021–22
- Supercoppa Italiana: 2021

Individual

- Armando Picchi Award: 2010–11
- Serie A Team of the Year: 2010–11

Sporting positions
Preceded by Javier Zanetti	Inter Milan captain 2014–2015	Succeeded by Mauro Icardi
