= Michael Ntube =

Italian football player

Personal information
- Full name: Michael Ronaldo Mboe Ntube
- Date of birth: 4 February 2001 (age 25)
- Place of birth: Ferrara, Italy
- Height: 1.87 m (6 ft 2 in)
- Position: Defender

Youth career
- –2015: SPAL
- 2015–2020: Inter Milan

Senior career*
Years	Team	Apps	(Gls)
2020–2021	Inter Milan	0	(0)
2020–2021	→ Pro Sesto (loan)	20	(0)
2021–2023	AlbinoLeffe	22	(0)
2023–2024	Virtus Verona	16	(0)
2024–2026	Desenzano	42	(0)

International career^{‡}
2016–2017	Italy U16	14	(0)
2017–2018	Italy U17	3	(0)
2018–2019	Italy U18	8	(0)
2019–2020	Italy U19	7	(1)
- * Club domestic league appearances and goals as of 3 May 2026 ‡ National team caps and goals as of 12 February 2020

Michael Ronaldo Mboe Ntube (born 4 February 2001) is an Italian footballer who plays as a defender.

== Club career ==
=== Inter Milan ===
He was raised in the youth system of Inter and represented the club in the 2018–19 UEFA Youth League and 2019–20 UEFA Youth League.

==== Loan to Pro Sesto ====
On 16 September 2020, he joined Serie C club Pro Sesto on a season-long loan.

He made his professional Serie C debut for Pro Sesto on 7 October 2020 in a game against AlbinoLeffe, as a starter.

=== AlbinoLeffe ===
On 24 August 2021, Ntube joined AlbinoLeffe on a permanent deal.

=== Virtus Verona ===
On 29 August 2023, Ntube signed a one-season contract with Virtus Verona.

== International career ==
Born in Italy, Ntube is of Cameroonian descent. He was first called up to represent Italy in 2016 with the Under-16 squad. With the Under-17 team, he was called up to the Under-17 Euro qualifiers, but remained on the bench and was not selected for the final tournament squad. With the Under-19 team, he appeared in the Under-19 Euro qualifiers, but the final tournament was cancelled due to the COVID-19 pandemic in Europe.
