= Giacomo Pozzer =

Italian footballer

Personal information
- Date of birth: 19 February 2001 (age 25)
- Place of birth: Mirano, Italy
- Height: 1.93 m (6 ft 4 in)
- Position: Goalkeeper

Team information
- Current team: Giorgione

Youth career
- –2015: Vicenza
- 2015–2020: Inter Milan

Senior career*
Years	Team	Apps	(Gls)
2020–2021	Inter Milan	0	(0)
2020–2021	→ Monopoli (loan)	6	(0)
2021	→ Lucchese (loan)	5	(0)
2021–2022	Juve Stabia	0	(0)
2022–2023	Matera Grumentum	23	(0)
2023–2024	Trento	4	(0)
2024–2025	Sammaurese	28	(0)
2025–2026	Portogruaro	2	(0)
2026–	Giorgione		

International career^{‡}
2016	Italy U15	2	(0)
2016–2017	Italy U16	4	(0)
2018	Italy U18	1	(0)
- * Club domestic league appearances and goals as of 21 December 2025 ‡ National team caps and goals as of 18:04, 21 July 2021 (UTC)

Giacomo Pozzer (born 19 February 2001) is an Italian professional footballer who plays as a goalkeeper for Eccellenza club Giorgione.

== Club career ==
On 24 August 2022, Pozzer moved to Matera Grumentum in Serie D.

On 10 August 2023, Pozzer joined Trento on a one-season deal.

== Career statistics ==
As of 20 August 2021.

Appearances and goals by club, season and competition
Club	Season	League			Cup		Other		Total	
Club	Season	Division	Apps	Goals	Apps	Goals	Apps	Goals	Apps	Goals
Inter Milan	2020–21	Serie A	0	0	0	0	0	0	0	0
Monopoli (loan)	2020–21	Serie C	6	0	3 (Note: Appearances in the Coppa Italia)	0	0	0	9	0
Lucchese (loan)	2020–21	Serie C	5	0	0	0	0	0	5	0
Juve Stabia	2021–22	Serie C	0	0	0	0	0	0	0	0
Career total			11	0	3	0	0	0	14	0
