= Roberto Gagliardini =

Italian footballer (born 1994)

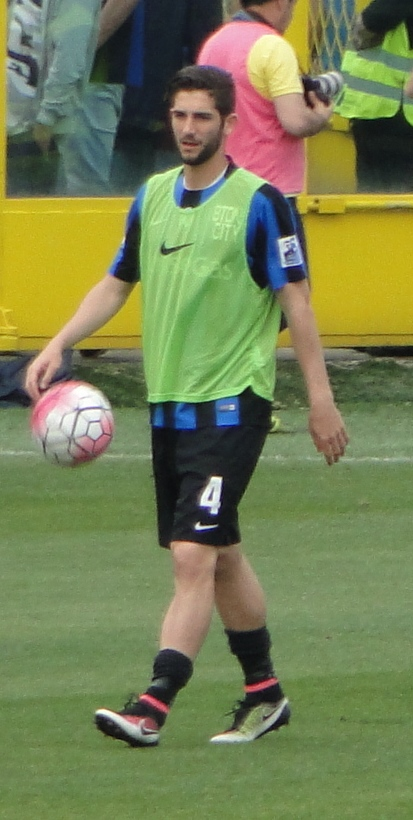
- Gagliardini with Atalanta in 2016

Personal information
- Date of birth: 7 April 1994 (age 32)
- Place of birth: Bergamo, Italy
- Height: 1.90 m (6 ft 3 in)
- Position: Defensive midfielder

Team information
- Current team: Cagliari
- Number: 21

Youth career
- 2001–2013: Atalanta

Senior career*
Years	Team	Apps	(Gls)
2013–2017	Atalanta	14	(0)
2014	→ Cesena (loan)	19	(1)
2014–2015	→ Spezia (loan)	14	(1)
2015–2016	→ Vicenza (loan)	16	(1)
2017	→ Inter Milan (loan)	18	(2)
2017–2023	Inter Milan	138	(14)
2023–2025	Monza	41	(1)
2025–2026	Hellas Verona	29	(1)
2026–	Cagliari	2	(0)

International career^{‡}
2014–2015	Italy U20	5	(2)
2015–2017	Italy U21	6	(0)
2017–2020	Italy	7	(0)
- * Club domestic league appearances and goals as of 19 September 2026 ‡ National team caps and goals as of 11 November 2020

Roberto Gagliardini (Italian pronunciation: [roˈbɛrto ɡaʎʎarˈdiːni]; born 7 April 1994) is an Italian professional footballer who plays as a defensive midfielder for Serie A club Cagliari.

== Club career ==
=== Atalanta and loan spells ===
Born in Bergamo to a physical education teacher father and a Sicilian mother, Gagliardini began his career at hometown club Atalanta playing for their youth teams and later for the reserves. He was promoted to the first-team squad for the 2013–14 season.

On 4 December 2013, Gagliardini made his professional debut, starting in a 2–0 home win over Sassuolo, for the campaign's Coppa Italia.

==== Loan to Cesena ====
On 17 January 2014, he was loaned to Serie B side Cesena with a 6-month loan deal. On 25 January he made his debut for Cesena as a substitute, replacing Guido Marilungo in the 74th minute and one minute later he scored his first career goal in a 3–1 away win over Varese. On 2 February, Gagliardini played his first full match for Cesena, a 1–1 away draw against Virtus Lanciano. On 6 June, Gagliardini was sent-off with a double yellow card in the 67th minute of a 1–0 away win against Modena. Gagliardini ended his 6-month loan to Cesena with 21 apeparences, including 16 as a starter, and 1 goal. He helped the team win promotion to Serie A.

==== Loan to Spezia ====
On 1 September 2014, he was loaned to Serie B side Spezia on a season-long loan deal. On 7 September he made his debut for Spezia as a substitute replacing Juri Cisotti in the 68th minute of a 2–1 home win over Frosinone. On 24 January 2015, Gagliardini played his first entire match for Spezia and he scored his first goal in the 55th minute of a 1–1 away draw against Frosinone. Gagilardini ended his season-long loan to Spezia with 14 appearances and 1 goal.

==== Loan to Vicenza ====
On 29 July 2015, Gagliardini moved to Serie B side Vicenza on loan, with an option to purchase. On 9 August he made his debut for Vicenza in the second round of Coppa Italia in a match won at penalty 4–2 against Cosenza. On 15 August, Gagliardini played in the third round of Coppa Italia, he was replaced by Giovanni Sbrissa in the 78th minute of a 1–0 away win over Empoli. On 6 September he made his Serie B debut for Vicenza in a 1–0 away win against Modena. On 27 October, Gagilardini scored his first goal for Vicenza in the 24th minute of a 2–1 away win over Trapani. On 3 December he played in the fourth round of Coppa Italia in a 2–1 away defeat against Carpi, he was replaced in the 64th minute by Salvatore D'Elia. Gagliardi finished his loan to Vicenza with 19 appearances and 1 goal.

==== Return to Atalanta ====
On 15 May 2016, he made his Serie A debut with Atalanta in a 2–1 away win over Genoa, on the final match-day of the 2015–16 season. The first half of the following season, he was promoted to the starting line-up, making 13 more league appearances for the club.

=== Inter Milan ===
On 11 January 2017, Gagliardini joined Inter Milan on loan, with an obligation to buy in the summer of 2018. He was presented two days later, where he was assigned the squad number 5 (previously worn by Felipe Melo, who left Inter in the same transfer window). Gagliardini made his Inter debut on 14 January against Chievo at San Siro, playing the full-90 minutes in a 3–1 win to help the Nerazzurri claim their fifth consecutive league victory. On 5 March, he scored his first goal for Inter in a 5–1 win at Cagliari. The following week, Gagliardini scored against his parent club Atalanta in a 7–1 thrashing by Inter.

=== Monza ===
On 7 July 2023, Gagliardini signed for Monza as a free agent on a one-year deal, with an option to extend a further year.

=== Cagliari ===
On 31 August 2026, Galgiardini moved to Cagliari with a one-season contract, with an optional second year.

== International career ==
On 28 February 2014, Gagliardini was called up to the Italy under-20 side. On 12 August 2015, he made his debut with the under-21 side under manager Luigi Di Biagio, in a friendly match against Hungary, which ended in a 0–0 draw.

In November 2016, Gagliardini was called up to the Italian senior squad for the first time by manager Gian Piero Ventura for a 2018 FIFA World Cup qualification match against Liechtenstein and a friendly match against Germany, following an injury to Claudio Marchisio.

On 28 March 2017, Gagliardini made his first senior appearance for the Italy national football team, along with four other players; he came off the bench to replace the injured Daniele De Rossi in the 37th minute of a 2–1 friendly away win against the Netherlands.

In June 2017, he was included in the Italy under-21 squad for the 2017 UEFA European Under-21 Championship by manager Di Biagio. Italy were eliminated by Spain in the semi-finals on 27 June, following a 3–1 defeat, during which Gagliardini was sent off.

== Style of play ==
At 1.90 m (6 ft 3 in) tall, Gagliardini is a complete midfielder, known for his physical attributes, work-rate, vision, ability to read the game, and technique. He also possesses a good shot from outside the penalty area. He can play as a defensive midfielder, central midfielder or mezzala.

== Career statistics ==
=== Club ===
As of match played 17 May 2026

Appearances and goals by club, season and competition
Club	Season	League			Coppa Italia		Europe		Other		Total	
Club	Season	Division	Apps	Goals	Apps	Goals	Apps	Goals	Apps	Goals	Apps	Goals
Cesena (loan)	2013–14	Serie B	21	1	—		—		—		21	1
Spezia (loan)	2014–15	Serie B	14	1	0	0	—		—		14	1
Vicenza (loan)	2015–16	Serie B	16	1	3	0	—		—		19	1
Atalanta	2013–14	Serie A	0	0	1	0	—		—		1	0
Atalanta	2015–16	Serie A	1	0	0	0	—		—		1	0
Atalanta	2016–17	Serie A	13	0	1	0	—		—		14	0
Atalanta	Total		14	0	2	0	—		—		16	0
Inter Milan (loan)	2016–17	Serie A	18	2	1	0	0	0	—		19	2
Inter Milan	2017–18	Serie A	30	0	2	0	—		—		32	0
Inter Milan	2018–19	Serie A	19	5	2	0	0	0	—		21	5
Inter Milan	2019–20	Serie A	24	4	0	0	8	0	—		32	4
Inter Milan	2020–21	Serie A	28	3	1	0	4	0	—		33	3
Inter Milan	2021–22	Serie A	18	2	1	0	5	0	0	0	24	2
Inter Milan	2022–23	Serie A	19	0	3	0	6	0	1 (Note: Appearance in Supercoppa Italiana)	0	29	0
Inter Milan	Inter total		156	16	10	0	23	0	1	0	190	16
Monza	2023–24	Serie A	33	1	1	0	—		—		34	1
Monza	2024–25	Serie A	8	0	0	0	—		—		8	0
Monza	Total		41	1	1	0	—		—		42	1
Hellas Verona	2025–26	Serie A	29	1	0	0	—		—		29	1
Career total			291	21	16	0	23	0	1	0	331	21

=== International ===
As of match played 11 November 2020

Appearances and goals by national team and year
National team	Year	Apps	Goals
Italy	2017	3	0
Italy	2018	3	0
Italy	2020	1	0
Total		7	0

== Honours ==
Inter Milan

- Serie A: 2020–21
- Coppa Italia: 2021–22, 2022–23
- Supercoppa Italiana: 2021, 2022
- UEFA Champions League runner-up: 2022–23
- UEFA Europa League runner-up: 2019–20
