= 2023–24 Inter Milan season =

Inter Milan
2023–24 season
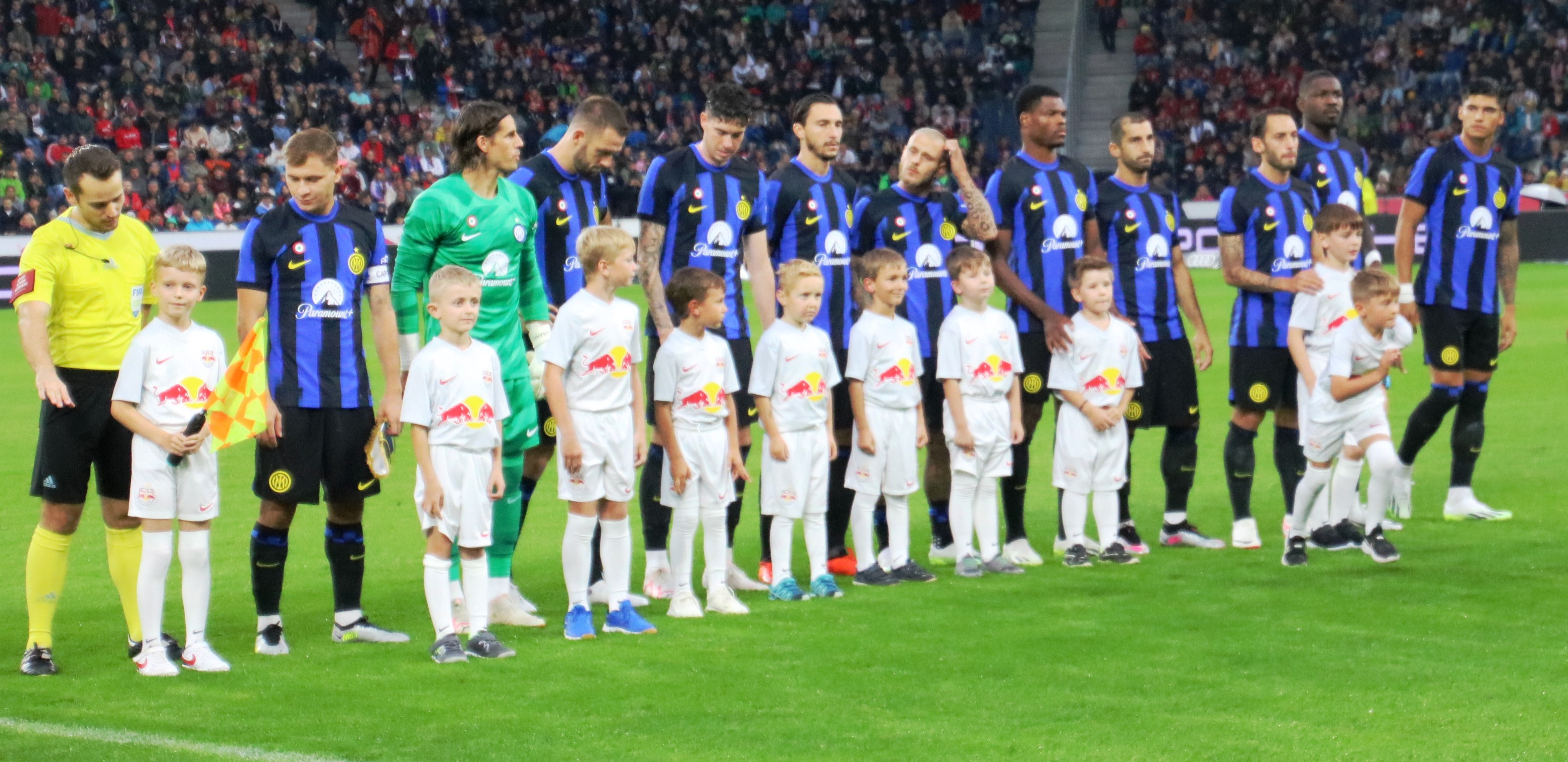
- Inter players line up before a pre-season friendly against Salzburg in August 2023
- Chairman: Steven Zhang
- Head coach: Simone Inzaghi
- Stadium: San Siro
- Serie A: 1st
- Coppa Italia: Round of 16
- Supercoppa Italiana: Winners
- UEFA Champions League: Round of 16
- Top goalscorer: League: Lautaro Martínez (24); All: Lautaro Martínez (27)
- Highest home attendance: 75,573 v Roma; 29 October 2023 (Serie A)
- Lowest home attendance: 63,519 v Bologna; 20 December 2023 (Coppa Italia)
- Average home league attendance: 72,838
- Biggest win: 5–0 v Frosinone; 10 May 2024 (Serie A)
- Biggest defeat: 1–2 v Sassuolo; 27 September 2023 (Serie A); 1–2 v Bologna; 20 December 2023 (Coppa Italia); 1–2 v Atlético Madrid; 13 March 2024 (UEFA Champions League); 0–1 v Sassuolo; 4 May 2024 (Serie A)
Home colours	Away colours	Third colours

The 2023–24 season was the 116th season in the existence of Inter Milan, which have all been played in the top division of Italian football. In addition to the domestic league, Inter participated in this season's editions of the Coppa Italia, the Supercoppa Italiana and the UEFA Champions League.

This season was the first since 2011–12 without Slovenian goalkeeper Samir Handanović, who announced his departure following the end of his contract, the first since 2013–14 without centre-back Danilo D'Ambrosio who departed the Nerazzurri club to join Monza, and the first since 2014–15 without Croatian midfielder Marcelo Brozović, who also left after being transferred to Saudi Arabian club Al Nassr.

On 20 December, Coppa Italia defending champions suffered a 1–2 loss after extra time against Bologna in the round of 16, getting knocked out of the competition. On 22 January, the Nerazzurri clinched their third consecutive Supercoppa Italiana by defeating Lazio 3–0 in the semi-finals and Napoli 1–0 in the final. After reaching the final in the 2022–23 edition, Inter's Champions League campaign was cut short on 13 March by getting knocked out at the round of 16 stage by Atlético Madrid. After drawing on aggregate 2–2, the Colchoneros went on to win the deciding penalty shoot-out 3–2. On 22 April, with five games to spare, Inter were mathematically confirmed as Serie A champions for the twentieth time in their history after defeating second-placed and city rivals AC Milan in the Derby della Madonnina, earning the second star above their badge.

== Kits ==
Supplier: Nike / Front sponsor: Paramount+ / Back sponsor: U-Power / Sleeve sponsor: eBay

Outfield players kits

Home	Home alt.	Away	Away alt.	Third

Goalkeeper kits

Goalkeeper 1	Goalkeeper 2	Goalkeeper 3	Goalkeeper 4

== Season summary ==
=== Pre-season ===
In the aftermath of the 2022–23 season, Inter was forced to undergo an extensive squad makeover, as Samir Handanović, Alex Cordaz, Milan Škriniar, Dalbert, Stefan de Vrij, Danilo D'Ambrosio, Roberto Gagliardini and Edin Džeko had their contracts set to expire, alongside Romelu Lukaku, Francesco Acerbi and Raoul Bellanova having their loan spells coming to an end. On 1 July, Inter announced their first signing of the season, French striker Marcus Thuram from Borussia Mönchengladbach, who agreed to a five-year contract with the Nerazzurri. On 3 July, Croatian playmaker Marcelo Brozović joined Saudi club Al Nassr for a reported fee of €18 million, leaving Inter after eight and a half seasons. On 5 July, both Alessandro Bastoni and Hakan Çalhanoğlu renewed their contracts, respectively until 2028 and 2027. On 6 July, Inter signed midfielder Davide Frattesi from Sassuolo on a season-long loan with an obligation to buy, for a reported total fee of €33 million. On 7 July, Inter activated the option to make Acerbi transfer from Lazio permanent. A day later, Inter also confirmed that De Vrij extended his contract with the club until 2025. On 12 July, Inter triggered the €7 million release clause to sign promising German centre-back Yann Aurel Bisseck from Danish club AGF, who agreed to a five-year deal. On 13 July, Inter officialised the return of former youth academy goalkeeper Raffaele Di Gennaro. On 19 July, Colombian right-midfielder Juan Cuadrado joined Inter as a free agent in a rather controversial move, after his contract with bitter rivals Juventus expired. On 20 July, after weeks of speculations, goalkeeper André Onana joined Manchester United for a reported fee of €52.5 million, agreeing to a five-year contract with the English side and leaving Inter after only one season. On 26 July, Lautaro Martínez was officially appointed as the new club captain after the departures of former skipper Handanović and club veterans D'Ambrosio, Brozović and Škriniar. On 7 August, Inter signed Swiss goalkeeper Yann Sommer from Bayern Munich for a reported €6.75 million fee, penning a three-year contract with the club. Three days later, Inter completed their goalkeeper roster by signing Emil Audero from Sampdoria on a season-long loan. On 15 August, Robin Gosens joined Union Berlin on a permanent transfer for a reported fee of €15 million. On the same day, Inter filled the now-vacant left wing-back spot by signing Carlos Augusto from Monza on a season-long loan with a conditional obligation to buy for a reported total fee of €12 million plus bonuses. On 16 August, Austrian striker Marko Arnautović made his return to Inter after 13 years, joining from Bologna on a season-long loan with a conditional obligation to buy for a reported fee of €8 million.

=== August ===
On 19 August, Inter started their Serie A campaign with a 2–0 home victory against Monza, thanks to a brace from Lautaro. On 25 August, Joaquín Correa joined French side Marseille on a season-long loan with an option and a conditional obligation to buy. The next day, Alexis Sánchez returned to Inter, joining as a free agent following his season-long experience at Marseille. On 28 August, Inter grabbed his second win by beating Cagliari 2–0 with the goals from Denzel Dumfries and Lautaro. On 30 August, after weeks of negotiations, Inter completed the signing of French defender Benjamin Pavard from Bayern Munich for a reported fee of €30 million, signing a five-year contract.

=== September ===
On the deadline day of the summer transfer window, Inter signed Dutch midfielder Davy Klaassen from Ajax on a free transfer. On 3 September, Inter convincingly defeated Fiorentina 4–0 thanks to the debut goal of Thuram, a brace from Lautaro and a penalty kick transformed by Çalhanoğlu. On 5 September, head coach Simone Inzaghi extended his contract with the Nerazzurri until 2025. On 16 September, the Derby della Madonnina took place, with both Inter and Milan undefeated and joint top of the table. In a dominating display, Inter beat their city rivals 5–1 thanks to a brace from Henrikh Mkhitaryan, a goal from Thuram, a penalty transformed by Çalhanoğlu, and the debut goal of Frattesi, with Rafael Leão scoring the only goal for the Rossoneri. On 20 September, Inter struggled away from home against Real Sociedad in their seasonal Champions League debut, with the Spanish side taking the lead early in the game thanks to Brais Méndez, and Lautaro scoring a late equaliser to earn the Nerazzurri a 1–1 draw. Four days later, Inter continued their domestic league winning streak by defeating Empoli 1–0, thanks to a half-volley goal from outside the box by Federico Dimarco. On 27 September, Inter suffered their first defeat of the season, losing 1–2 against Sassuolo, with the team's only goal coming from Dumfries. Three days later, the Nerazzurri returned to their winning ways by defeating Salernitana 4–0, with Lautaro scoring all four goals after being subbed on in the 55th minute.

=== October ===
On 3 October, Inter faced Benfica in the second match of the Champions League, defeating the Portuguese team 1–0 with a goal from Thuram. Four days later, Inter drew 2–2 against Bologna, blowing the 2–0 lead obtained with the goals from Acerbi and Lautaro. On 21 October, goals from Lautaro, Thuram, and a stoppage-time penalty kick scored by Çalhanoğlu granted Inter a 3–0 win against Torino. Three days later, Inter won 2–1 against Red Bull Salzburg in the third match of the Champions League, thanks to the goals from Sánchez and Çalhanoğlu. On 29 October, Inter defeated Roma 1–0, with Thuram breaking the deadlock in the 81st minute.

=== November ===
Inter started the month of November by obtaining a 2–1 win against Atalanta, with goals from Çalhanoğlu and Lautaro. On 8 November, Inter managed to beat Salzburg away from home 1–0 courtesy of a late penalty kick scored by Lautaro, and advanced to the round of 16 of the Champions League with two games to spare. On 12 November, Inter defeated Frosinone 2–0, thanks to a 56 metres lob goal from Dimarco and a penalty kick scored by Çalhanoğlu. On 26 November, Inter secured a 1–1 away draw in the Derby d'Italia against Juventus to maintain the top spot of the league, with Lautaro scoring the equaliser after a Dušan Vlahović goal. Three days later, the away match against Benfica in the Champions League ended 3–3, with the heavily rotated Nerazzurri side coming back in the second half with the goals from Arnautović, Frattesi, and Sánchez, after João Mário scored a first-half hat-trick against his former club.

=== December ===
On 3 December, Inter started the new month by defeating reigning Serie A champions Napoli 3–0 at the Stadio Diego Armando Maradona, with goals from Hakan Çalhanoğlu, Nicolò Barella and Marcus Thurman. On 9 December, the Nerazzurri comfortably won against Udinese 4–0, thanks to the goals from Çalhanoğlu, Dimarco, Thuram and Lautaro. Three days later, the last match of the Champions League group stage against Real Sociedad ended in a goalless draw, with the Basque side qualifying for the round of 16 as group winners thanks to the better goal difference and Inter finishing second place. On 17 December, Inter defeated Lazio 2–0 away from home, courtesy of the goals from Lautaro and Thuram. On the same day it was officially announced that Inter was qualified for the 2025 FIFA Club World Cup due to their 4-year UEFA ranking. On 20 December, a headed goal from Carlos Augusto in the extra-time was not enough to defeat Bologna in the round of 16 of the Coppa Italia and Inter were beaten by a scoreline of 1–2, knocking them out of the competition. On 23 December, Bisseck's debut goal and a strike from Barella gave the Nerazzurri a 2–0 home victory over Lecce. On 29 December, Inzaghi's team drew 1–1 against Genoa away from home in their last match of the year, with the only goal for Inter coming from Marko Arnautović. On 30 December, the club announced the contract extension for three players: Federico Dimarco until 2027, Matteo Darmian until 2025, and Henrikh Mkhitaryan until 2026.

=== January ===
On 5 January, following Juan Cuadrado's Achilles tendon surgery, Inter signed Canadian wing-back Tajon Buchanan from Club Brugge as his replacement for a fee of €8.5 million plus bonuses. The following day Inter beat Verona 2–1 in the first match of the year thanks to the goals from Lautaro and Frattesi, ending the first half of the season as league leaders. On 13 January, Inzaghi's side won 5–1 against Monza away from home, thanks to the braces from Çalhanoğlu and Lautaro, and a goal from Thuram. After the game against Monza, Inter flew to Riyadh in Saudi Arabia to play the Supercoppa Italiana. As a result, the match against Atalanta originally scheduled for 21 January was postponed, and Juventus surpassed the Nerazzurri as league leaders by defeating Lecce on 22 January and having a game in hand. On 19 January, Inter defeated Lazio 3–0 in the semi-finals of the Supercoppa Italiana with the goals from Thuram, Çalhanoğlu, and Frattesi. Three days later the Nerazzurri beat Napoli 1–0 in the final thanks to an injury time strike from Lautaro Martínez, winning their eighth Supercoppa title, the third in a row. On 28 January, a header from Lautaro secured Inter a 1–0 victory over Fiorentina in the last match of the month, and allowed the team to regain the top spot of the league, after Juventus drew against Empoli.

=== February ===
On 4 February, the second Derby d'Italia of the season was decided by an own goal from Federico Gatti, granting Inter a 1–0 victory at San Siro and increasing the point gap between the two teams. On 10 February, Inter obtained a 4–2 comeback win against Roma at the Stadio Olimpico with goals from Acerbi, Thuram and Bastoni, as well as an own goal from Angeliño. On 16 February, goals from Thuram, Lautaro, Dumfries and Arnautović granted Inter a comfortable 4–0 home victory over Salernitana. Four days later, Inzaghi's side obtained a tight 1–0 win in the first leg of the Champions League round of 16 against Atlético Madrid, with Marko Arnautović claiming the winning goal. On 25 February, a brace from Lautaro and the goals from Frattesi and De Vrij gave Inter a 4–0 win against Lecce. Three days later, Inter defeated Atalanta 4–0 in the last match of the month, thanks to the goals from Darmian, Lautaro, Dimarco and Frattesi. This extended the gap between Inter Milan and 2nd placed Juventus by 12 points.

=== March ===
On 4 March, Kristjan Asllani's first goal with the Nerazzurri shirt and a penalty kick scored by Alexis Sánchez granted Inter a narrow 2–1 win against Genoa, widening the gap between Inzaghi's side and Juventus by 15 points. Five days later, Inter won their tenth consecutive league game by beating Bologna 1–0 through a Yann Bisseck header. On 13 March, Inter's campaign in the UEFA Champions League came to an end in the round of 16, after going out on penalties to Atlético Madrid. Inter initially took the lead with a Federico Dimarco goal, but the Colchoneros came back with strikes from Antoine Griezmann and Memphis Depay, setting the aggregate score to 2–2, before eliminating the Nerazzurri in the penalty shoot-out. This was Inter's first defeat in 2024, interrupting a 13-match winning streak in all competitions. On 17 March, Inter drew 1–1 against Napoli in Serie A, with the only goal for the Black and Blues coming from Darmian.

=== April ===
On the first match of the month against Empoli on 1 April, Inter returned to their winning ways by defeating the Tuscanian team 2–0, thanks to the goals from Federico Dimarco and Alexis Sánchez. On the same day, also as a result of the goalless draw between Lecce and Roma, Inter was the first Italian team to qualify for the 2024–25 UEFA Champions League. On 8 April, a penalty kick from Çalhanoğlu and an injury time goal from Frattesi granted Inter a 2–1 comeback win against Udinese. On 14 April, goals from Thuram and Çalhanoğlu were not enough to beat Cagliari at San Siro, with the game ending in a 2–2 draw. On 22 April, Inter beat Milan 2–1 in the second Derby della Madonnina of the season thanks to the goals from Acerbi and Thuram, mathematically securing their historic 20th scudetto and second star with five games to spare. Six days later, a brace from Çalhanoğlu gave Inter a 2–0 win against Torino in the last match of April.

=== May ===
Inter started May by suffering their second league loss of the season, losing 0–1 against relegation-battling Sassuolo, with the Neroverdi defeating the newly crowned champions again after doing so in the first half of the campaign and ending their 28-game unbeaten run in Serie A. On 10 May, Inter returned to winning ways by defeating Frosinone 5–0 with the goals from Frattesi, Arnautović, Buchanan (his debut goal with the Nerazzurri shirt), Lautaro and Thuram. On 19 May, Inter drew 1–1 against Lazio in the last home game of the season, with Dumfries scoring the late equaliser. On 26 May, Inter drew 2–2 against Verona in the last match of the season, with Marko Arnautović scoring a brace for the Nerazzurri. At the end of the season Lautaro Martínez finished as league's top scorer with 24 goals, and was named Serie A MVP of the season. Alessandro Bastoni and Hakan Çalhanoğlu won the best Serie A defender and midfielder awards of the season respectively, and Simone Inzaghi was named the best coach of the league for 2023–24.

== Players ==
=== First-team squad ===
As of 10 January 2024

Note: Flags indicate national team as defined under FIFA eligibility rules. Players may hold more than one non-FIFA nationality.

No.	Player	Nat.	Position(s)	Date of birth (age)	Height	Preferred Foot	Signed		Transfer fee	Contract end	Ref.
No.	Player	Nat.	Position(s)	Date of birth (age)	Height	Preferred Foot	In	From	Transfer fee	Contract end	Ref.
Goalkeepers
1	Yann Sommer	SUI	GK	17 December 1988 (aged 35)	1.83 m (6 ft 0 in)	Right	2023	(Germany) Bayern Munich	€6.75m	2026	
12	Raffaele Di Gennaro	ITA	GK	3 October 1993 (aged 30)	1.86 m (6 ft 1 in)	Right	2023	(Italy) Gubbio	Free	2024	
77	Emil Audero	ITA	GK	18 January 1997 (aged 27)	1.92 m (6 ft 4 in)	Right	2023	(Italy) Sampdoria (on loan)	N/A	2024	
Defenders
6	Stefan de Vrij	NED	CB	5 February 1992 (aged 32)	1.89 m (6 ft 2 in)	Right	2018	(Italy) Lazio	Free	2025	
15	Francesco Acerbi	ITA	CB	10 February 1988 (aged 36)	1.92 m (6 ft 4 in)	Left	2022	(Italy) Lazio	€4.0m (Note: Total transfer fee including the initial loan fee.)	2025	
28	Benjamin Pavard	FRA	CB / RB	28 March 1996 (aged 28)	1.86 m (6 ft 1 in)	Right	2023	(Germany) Bayern Munich	€30.0m	2028	
31	Yann Aurel Bisseck	GER	CB	29 November 2000 (aged 23)	1.96 m (6 ft 5 in)	Right	2023	(Denmark) AGF	€7.0m	2028	
32	Federico Dimarco	ITA	LWB / LM / CB	10 November 1997 (aged 26)	1.75 m (5 ft 9 in)	Left	2018	(Switzerland) Sion	€5.2m	2027	
36	Matteo Darmian	ITA	RWB / RM / CB	2 December 1989 (aged 34)	1.82 m (6 ft 0 in)	Right	2020	(Italy) Parma	€3.3m	2025	
95	Alessandro Bastoni	ITA	CB	13 April 1999 (aged 25)	1.90 m (6 ft 3 in)	Left	2017	(Italy) Atalanta	€31.1m	2028	
Midfielders
2	Denzel Dumfries	NED	RM / RWB	18 April 1996 (aged 28)	1.88 m (6 ft 2 in)	Right	2021	(Netherlands) PSV Eindhoven	€14.25m	2025	
5	Stefano Sensi	ITA	CM / AM	5 August 1995 (aged 28)	1.68 m (5 ft 6 in)	Right	2019	(Italy) Sassuolo	€27.0m	2024	
7	Juan Cuadrado	COL	RM / RWB	26 May 1988 (aged 36)	1.76 m (5 ft 9 in)	Right	2023	(Italy) Juventus	Free	2024	
14	Davy Klaassen	NED	CM / AM	21 February 1993 (aged 31)	1.79 m (5 ft 10 in)	Right	2023	(Netherlands) Ajax	Free	2024	
16	Davide Frattesi	ITA	CM	22 September 1999 (aged 24)	1.78 m (5 ft 10 in)	Right	2023	(Italy) Sassuolo (on loan)	€6.0m (Note: Loan fee.)	2024	
17	Tajon Buchanan	CAN	RM / LM / RWB / LWB	8 February 1999 (aged 25)	1.83 m (6 ft 0 in)	Right	2024	(Belgium) Club Brugge	€8.5m	2028	
20	Hakan Çalhanoğlu	TUR	DM / CM	8 February 1994 (aged 30)	1.78 m (5 ft 10 in)	Right	2021	(Italy) Milan	Free	2027	
21	Kristjan Asllani	ALB	DM / CM	9 March 2002 (aged 22)	1.79 m (5 ft 10 in)	Right	2022	(Italy) Empoli	€14.5m	2027	
22	Henrikh Mkhitaryan	ARM	CM / AM	21 January 1989 (aged 35)	1.77 m (5 ft 10 in)	Both	2022	(Italy) Roma	Free	2026	
23	Nicolò Barella (vice-captain)	ITA	CM	7 February 1997 (aged 27)	1.75 m (5 ft 9 in)	Right	2019	(Italy) Cagliari	€40.5m	2026	
30	Carlos Augusto	BRA	LM / LWB / CB	7 January 1999 (aged 25)	1.84 m (6 ft 0 in)	Left	2023	(Italy) Monza (on loan)	€4.5m	2024	
Forwards
8	Marko Arnautović	AUT	ST	19 April 1989 (aged 35)	1.92 m (6 ft 4 in)	Both	2023	(Italy) Bologna (on loan)	N/A	2024	
9	Marcus Thuram	FRA	ST	6 August 1997 (aged 26)	1.92 m (6 ft 4 in)	Right	2023	(Germany) Borussia Mönchengladbach	Free	2028	
10	Lautaro Martínez (captain)	ARG	ST	22 August 1997 (aged 26)	1.74 m (5 ft 9 in)	Right	2018	(Argentina) Racing Club	€25.0m	2026	
70	Alexis Sánchez	CHI	ST / SS	19 December 1988 (aged 35)	1.69 m (5 ft 7 in)	Right	2023	(France) Marseille	Free	2024	

=== Youth academy players ===
Inter Primavera players that received a first-team squad call-up.

No.	Player	Nat.	Position(s)	Date of birth (age)
40	Alessandro Calligaris	(Italy)	GK	7 March 2005 (aged 19)
41	Ebenezer Akinsanmiro	(Nigeria)	CM / AM	25 November 2004 (aged 19)
43	Matteo Motta	(Italy)	LB	10 February 2005 (aged 19)
44	Giacomo Stabile	(Italy)	CB	12 April 2005 (aged 19)
47	Issiaka Kamate	(France)	CM	2 August 2004 (aged 19)
49	Amadou Sarr	(Senegal)	ST	28 June 2004 (aged 20)
50	Aleksandar Stanković	(Serbia)	DM / CB	3 August 2005 (aged 18)

== Transfers ==
=== In ===
==== Transfers ====
Date	Pos.	Player	Moving from	Fee	Notes	Source
Summer
1 July 2023	MF	(Albania) Kristjan Asllani	(Italy) Empoli	€10M	(Note: From loan to permanent transfer.)	
1 July 2023	FW	(France) Marcus Thuram	(Germany) Borussia Mönchengladbach	Free		
7 July 2023	DF	(Italy) Francesco Acerbi	(Italy) Lazio	€3.5M		
12 July 2023	DF	(Germany) Yann Aurel Bisseck	(Denmark) AGF	€7M		
13 July 2023	GK	(Italy) Raffaele Di Gennaro	(Italy) Gubbio	Undisclosed		
19 July 2023	MF	(Colombia) Juan Cuadrado	(Italy) Juventus	Free		
7 August 2023	GK	(Switzerland) Yann Sommer	(Germany) Bayern Munich	€6.75M		
26 August 2023	FW	(Chile) Alexis Sánchez	(France) Marseille	Free		
30 August 2023	DF	(France) Benjamin Pavard	(Germany) Bayern Munich	€30M	(Note: Inter is also expected to pay up to €2M of additional bonuses.)	
1 September 2023	MF	(Netherlands) Davy Klaassen	(Netherlands) Ajax	Free	(Note: Ajax will retain a 20% sell-on clause.)	
Winter
5 January 2024	MF	(Canada) Tajon Buchanan	(Belgium) Club Brugge	€8.5M	(Note: Inter is also expected to pay up to €2.5M of additional bonuses.)	

==== On loan ====
Date	Pos.	Player	Loaned from	Fee	Notes	Source
Summer
6 July 2023	MF	(Italy) Davide Frattesi	(Italy) Sassuolo	€6M	(Note: Loan with obligation to buy for €27M plus €5M of additional bonuses. Sassuolo will also retain a 10% sell-on clause.)	
10 August 2023	GK	(Italy) Emil Audero	(Italy) Sampdoria	N/A	(Note: Loan with option to buy for €6.5M.)	
15 August 2023	DF	(Brazil) Carlos Augusto	(Italy) Monza	€4.5M	(Note: Loan with option and conditional obligation to buy for €7.5M plus bonuses.)	
16 August 2023	FW	(Austria) Marko Arnautović	(Italy) Bologna	N/A	(Note: Loan with option and conditional obligation to buy for €8M plus €2M of additional bonuses.)	

==== Loan returns ====
Date	Pos.	Player	Returning from	Notes	Source
Summer
30 June 2023	GK	(Italy) Fabrizio Bagheria	(Italy) Livorno		
30 June 2023	GK	(Brazil) Gabriel Brazão	(Italy) SPAL		
30 June 2023	GK	(Romania) Ionuț Radu	(France) Auxerre		
30 June 2023	GK	(Italy) William Rovida	(Italy) Carrarese		
30 June 2023	GK	(Serbia) Filip Stanković	(Netherlands) Volendam		
30 June 2023	DF	(Kosovo) Andi Hoti	(Germany) SC Freiburg II		
30 June 2023	DF	(Italy) Andrea Moretti	(Italy) Pro Sesto		
30 June 2023	DF	(Italy) Lorenzo Pirola	(Italy) Salernitana		
30 June 2023	DF	(Italy) Alessandro Silvestro	(Italy) Montevarchi		
30 June 2023	DF	(Italy) Edoardo Sottini	(Italy) Avellino		
30 June 2023	DF	(Belgium) Zinho Vanheusden	(Netherlands) AZ		
30 June 2023	DF	(Italy) Davide Zugaro	(Italy) Sangiuliano City		
30 June 2023	MF	(France) Lucien Agoumé	(France) Troyes		
30 June 2023	MF	(Italy) Giovanni Fabbian	(Italy) Reggina		
30 June 2023	MF	(Austria) Valentino Lazaro	(Italy) Torino		
30 June 2023	MF	(Switzerland) Darian Males	(Switzerland) Basel		
30 June 2023	MF	(Italy) Francesco Nunziatini	(Italy) San Donato Tavarnelle		
30 June 2023	MF	(Italy) Gaetano Oristanio	(Netherlands) Volendam		
30 June 2023	MF	(Belgium) Tibo Persyn	(Netherlands) FC Eindhoven		
30 June 2023	MF	(Italy) Lorenzo Peschetola	(Italy) Latina		
30 June 2023	MF	(Italy) Marco Pompetti	(Italy) Südtirol		
30 June 2023	MF	(Italy) Mattia Sangalli	(Italy) Trento		
30 June 2023	MF	(Italy) Stefano Sensi	(Italy) Monza		
30 June 2023	MF	(Italy) Niccolò Squizzato	(Italy) Renate		
30 June 2023	MF	(Argentina) Franco Vezzoni	(Italy) Pro Patria		
30 June 2023	MF	(Italy) David Wieser	(Italy) Pro Patria		
30 June 2023	FW	(Argentina) Facundo Colidio	(Argentina) Tigre		
30 June 2023	FW	(Italy) Sebastiano Esposito	(Italy) Bari		
30 June 2023	FW	(Italy) Samuele Mulattieri	(Italy) Frosinone		
30 June 2023	FW	(Italy) Andrea Pinamonti	(Italy) Sassuolo		
30 June 2023	FW	(Italy) Eddie Salcedo	(Italy) Genoa		
30 June 2023	FW	(Uruguay) Martín Satriano	(Italy) Empoli		
Winter
9 January 2024	DF	(Argentina) Franco Carboni	(Italy) Monza		
10 January 2024	FW	(Italy) Eddie Salcedo	(Spain) Eldense		
11 January 2024	FW	(Italy) Nicolò Biral	(Italy) Fermana		
31 January 2024	GK	(Greece) Nikolaos Botis	(Italy) Monopoli		
31 January 2024	FW	(Italy) Dennis Curatolo	(Italy) Fermana		
1 February 2024	DF	(Italy) Alessandro Silvestro	(Italy) Fiorenzuola		
2 February 2024	GK	(Brazil) Gabriel Brazão	(Italy) Ternana		

=== Out ===
==== Transfers ====
Date	Pos.	Player	Moving to	Fee	Notes	Source
Summer
1 July 2023	GK	(Italy) Alex Cordaz	Free agent		(Note: Contract expired.)	
1 July 2023	GK	(Slovenia) Samir Handanović	Retired			
1 July 2023	DF	(Italy) Danilo D'Ambrosio	(Italy) Monza	Free	(Note: Contract expired on 1 July 2023, transfer to Monza officialised on 2 August 2023.)	
1 July 2023	DF	(Brazil) Dalbert	(Brazil) Internacional	Free	(Note: Contract expired on 1 July 2023, transfer to Internacional officialised on 6 September 2023.)	
1 July 2023	DF	(Kosovo) Andi Hoti	(Germany) 1. FC Magdeburg	€0.25M	(Note: Transfer officialised on 30 June 2023.)	
1 July 2023	DF	(Italy) Lorenzo Pirola	(Italy) Salernitana	€5M	(Note: From loan to permanent transfer.)	
1 July 2023	DF	(Slovakia) Milan Škriniar	(France) Paris Saint-Germain	Free	(Note: Contract expired on 1 July 2023, transfer to Paris Saint-Germain officialised on 6 July 2023.)	
1 July 2023	MF	(Italy) Roberto Gagliardini	(Italy) Monza	Free	(Note: Contract expired on 1 July 2023, transfer to Monza officialised on 7 July 2023.)	
1 July 2023	MF	(Italy) Marco Pompetti	(Italy) Catanzaro	Undisclosed		
1 July 2023	FW	(Bosnia and Herzegovina) Edin Džeko	(Turkey) Fenerbahçe	Free	(Note: Contract expired on 1 July 2023, transfer to Fenerbahçe officialised on 22 June 2023.)	
1 July 2023	FW	(Italy) Andrea Pinamonti	(Italy) Sassuolo	€20M		
3 July 2023	MF	(Croatia) Marcelo Brozović	(Saudi Arabia) Al Nassr	€18M		
4 July 2023	DF	(Italy) Edoardo Sottini	(Italy) Cittadella	Undisclosed		
7 July 2023	FW	(Italy) Samuele Mulattieri	(Italy) Sassuolo	€6M		
11 July 2023	MF	(Czech Republic) Samuel Grygar	(Czech Republic) Baník Ostrava	Undisclosed		
13 July 2023	MF	(Italy) Lorenzo Peschetola	(Italy) Monopoli	Undisclosed		
15 July 2023	MF	(Belgium) Tibo Persyn	(Netherlands) FC Eindhoven	Undisclosed		
18 July 2023	MF	(Italy) Niccolò Squizzato	(Italy) Pescara	Undisclosed		
18 July 2023	MF	(Italy) Mattia Sangalli	(Italy) Trento	Undisclosed		
19 July 2023	MF	(Switzerland) Darian Males	(Switzerland) Young Boys	€2M	(Note: Inter will retain a 20% sell-on clause.)	
20 July 2023	GK	(Cameroon) André Onana	(England) Manchester United	€52.5M	(Note: Manchester United is also expected to pay up to €5M of additional bonuses.)	
21 July 2023	FW	(Argentina) Facundo Colidio	(Argentina) River Plate	€5M		
26 July 2023	DF	(Russia) Andrea Pelamatti	(Italy) Torres	Undisclosed		
28 July 2023	MF	(Italy) David Wieser	(Italy) Mantova	Undisclosed		
15 August 2023	DF	(Germany) Robin Gosens	(Germany) Union Berlin	€15M		
20 August 2023	MF	(Italy) Giovanni Fabbian	(Italy) Bologna	€5M	(Note: Inter will retain a €12M buy-back clause.)	
23 August 2023	MF	(Austria) Valentino Lazaro	(Italy) Torino	€4M	(Note: Inter will also retain a sell-on clause.)	
31 August 2023	MF	(Argentina) Franco Vezzoni	(Italy) Foggia	Undisclosed		
1 September 2023	MF	(Denmark) Silas Andersen	(Netherlands) Utrecht	Undisclosed		
Winter
12 January 2024	MF	(Italy) Nicolò Biral	(Italy) Montebelluna	Undisclosed		
1 February 2024	GK	(Greece) Nikolaos Botis	(Greece) Olympiacos	Undisclosed		
2 February 2024	DF	(Poland) Tommaso Guercio	(Poland) Śląsk Wrocław	Undisclosed		
27 February 2024	GK	(Brazil) Gabriel Brazão	(Brazil) Santos	Free		

==== Loans out ====
Date	Pos.	Player	Loaned to	Fee	Notes	Source
Summer
3 July 2023	DF	(Italy) Mattia Zanotti	(Switzerland) St. Gallen	N/A		
8 July 2023	DF	(Belgium) Zinho Vanheusden	(Belgium) Standard Liège	N/A	(Note: Loan with option to buy.)	
14 July 2023	FW	(Uruguay) Martín Satriano	(France) Brest	N/A		
15 July 2023	MF	(Argentina) Valentín Carboni	(Italy) Monza	N/A		
20 July 2023	MF	(Italy) Gaetano Oristanio	(Italy) Cagliari	N/A	(Note: Loan with option to buy and counter-option.)	
20 July 2023	GK	(Italy) William Rovida	(Italy) Pro Patria	N/A		
20 July 2023	DF	(Italy) Andrea Moretti	(Italy) Pro Patria	N/A		
22 July 2023	DF	(Italy) Alessandro Silvestro	(Italy) Fiorenzuola	N/A		
26 July 2023	MF	(Italy) Francesco Nunziatini	(Italy) Torres	N/A		
27 July 2023	GK	(Romania) Ionuț Radu	(England) Bournemouth	N/A		
1 August 2023	MF	(Italy) Jacopo Gianelli	(Italy) Fermana	N/A		
1 August 2023	FW	(Italy) Francesco Pio Esposito	(Italy) Spezia	N/A		
3 August 2023	GK	(Brazil) Gabriel Brazão	(Italy) Ternana	N/A		
4 August 2023	MF	(Italy) Jacopo Martini	(Italy) Foggia	N/A		
9 August 2023	DF	(Italy) Alessandro Fontanarosa	(Italy) Cosenza	N/A		
10 August 2023	FW	(Bulgaria) Nikola Iliev	(Bulgaria) CSKA 1948	N/A		
10 August 2023	MF	(Italy) Nicolò Biral	(Italy) Fermana	N/A		
10 August 2023	FW	(Italy) Dennis Curatolo	(Italy) Fermana	N/A		
11 August 2023	GK	(Serbia) Filip Stanković	(Italy) Sampdoria	N/A		
22 August 2023	FW	(Italy) Sebastiano Esposito	(Italy) Sampdoria	N/A		
25 August 2023	FW	(Italy) Eddie Salcedo	(Spain) Eldense	N/A		
25 August 2023	FW	(Argentina) Joaquín Correa	(France) Marseille	€2M	(Note: Loan with option and conditional obligation to buy for €10M)	
1 September 2023	GK	(Greece) Nikolaos Botis	(Italy) Monopoli	N/A		
Winter
9 January 2024	DF	(Argentina) Franco Carboni	(Italy) Ternana	N/A		
10 January 2024	MF	(France) Lucien Agoumé	(Spain) Sevilla	N/A		
10 January 2024	FW	(Italy) Eddie Salcedo	(Italy) Lecco	N/A		
11 January 2024	FW	(Poland) Jan Żuberek	(Italy) Ternana	N/A		
31 January 2024	FW	(Italy) Dennis Curatolo	(Italy) Pro Patria	N/A		
1 February 2024	DF	(Italy) Alessandro Silvestro	(Italy) Foggia	N/A		

==== Loans ended ====
Date	Pos.	Player	Returning to	Notes	Source
Summer
30 June 2023	DF	(Italy) Francesco Acerbi	(Italy) Lazio		
30 June 2023	DF	(Italy) Raoul Bellanova	(Italy) Cagliari		
30 June 2023	MF	(Albania) Kristjan Asllani	(Italy) Empoli		
30 June 2023	FW	(Belgium) Romelu Lukaku	(England) Chelsea		

== Pre-season and friendlies ==
Win Draw Loss Fixtures

18 July 2023 Friendly	Internazionale	3–0	Lugano	Appiano Gentile
18:30 CEST (UTC+2)	Fabbian 15'; Sensi 40'; Esposito 85'	Report		Stadium: Centro Sportivo Suning; Referee: Davide Ghersini

21 July 2023 Friendly	Internazionale	10–0	Pergolettese	Appiano Gentile
18:00 CEST (UTC+2)	Correa 19'; Bastoni 22'; Çalhanoğlu 30'; Dumfries 45+1'; Martínez 63', 76' (pen.), 87', 90+2' (pen.); Esposito 75'; Mkhitaryan 85'	Report		Stadium: Centro Sportivo Suning; Referee: Luca De Angeli

27 July 2023 Friendly	Al Nassr	1–1	Internazionale	Osaka, Japan
19:20 JST (UTC+9)	Ghareeb 23'	Report	Frattesi 44'	Stadium: Yanmar Stadium Nagai; Attendance: 12,000; Referee: Hiroyuki Kimura (Japan)

1 August 2023 Friendly	Paris Saint-Germain	1–2	Internazionale	Tokyo, Japan
19:00 JST (UTC+9)	Vitinha 64'	Report	Mkhitaryan (yellow card) 23'; Esposito 81'; Sensi 83'	Stadium: National Stadium; Referee: Jumpei Iida (Japan)

9 August 2023 Friendly	Red Bull Salzburg	3–4	Internazionale	Wals-Siezenheim, Austria
19:00 CEST (UTC+2)	Konaté (penalty missed) 5', 6', 34'; Baidoo 46'; Šimić (penalty missed) 69'	Report	Pavlović 9' (o.g.); De Vrij 24'; Correa 42'; Frattesi (yellow card) 76'; Sensi 90'	Stadium: Red Bull Arena; Attendance: 22,971; Referee: Sebastian Gishamer (Austria)

13 August 2023 Friendly	Internazionale	4–2	Egnatia	Ferrara
20:00 CEST (UTC+2)	Barella 55'; Martínez 79', 83' (pen.); Stabile 90'	Report	Dwamena 6'; Medeiros 68' (pen.)	Stadium: Stadio Paolo Mazza; Referee: Giovanni Ayroldi (Italy)

== Competitions ==
=== Overview ===
Competition	First match	Last match	Starting round	Final position	Record							
Competition	First match	Last match	Starting round	Final position	Pld	W	D	L	GF	GA	GD	Win %
Serie A	19 August 2023	26 May 2024	Matchday 1	Winners	38	29	7	2	89	22	+67	76.32
Coppa Italia	20 December 2023		Round of 16	Round of 16	1	0	0	1	1	2	−1	0.00
Supercoppa Italiana	19 January 2024	22 January 2024	Semi-finals	Winners	2	2	0	0	4	0	+4	100.00
UEFA Champions League	20 September 2023	13 March 2024	Group stage	Round of 16	8	4	3	1	10	7	+3	50.00
Total					49	35	10	4	104	31	+73	71.43

Source: Soccerway

=== Serie A ===
==== League table ====
Pos	Team	Pld	W	D	L	GF	GA	GD	Pts	Qualification or relegation
1	Inter Milan (C)	38	29	7	2	89	22	+67	94	Qualification for the Champions League league phase (Note: Serie A gained an additional Champions League place as a result of Italy finishing as one of the two associations with the highest coefficient points in 2023–24.)
2	Milan	38	22	9	7	76	49	+27	75	Qualification for the Champions League league phase
3	Juventus	38	19	14	5	54	31	+23	71	Qualification for the Champions League league phase
4	Atalanta	38	21	6	11	72	42	+30	69	Qualification for the Champions League league phase
5	Bologna	38	18	14	6	54	32	+22	68	Qualification for the Champions League league phase

Source: Serie A
Rules for classification: 1) Points; 2) Tiebreaker for Champions team and third relegated team; 3) Head-to-head points; 4) Head-to-head goal difference; 5) Goal difference; 6) Goals scored; 7) Draw.
(Note: Head-to-head record is used only after all the matches between the teams in question have been played)
(C) Champions

==== Results summary ====
Overall								Home						Away					
Pld	W	D	L	GF	GA	GD	Pts	W	D	L	GF	GA	GD	W	D	L	GF	GA	GD
38	29	7	2	89	22	+67	94	14	4	1	44	11	+33	15	3	1	45	11	+34

Source: Serie A

==== Results by round ====
Round	1	2	3	4	5	6	7	8	9	10	11	12	13	14	15	16	17	18	19	20	22	23	24	25	26	21^{1}	27	28	29	30	31	32	33	34	35	36	37	38
Ground	H	A	H	H	A	H	A	H	A	H	A	H	A	A	H	A	H	A	H	A	A	H	A	H	A	H	H	A	H	H	A	H	A	H	A	A	H	A
Result	W	W	W	W	W	L	W	D	W	W	W	W	D	W	W	W	W	D	W	W	W	W	W	W	W	W	W	W	D	W	W	D	W	W	L	W	D	D
Position	5	3	1	1	1	1	1	2	1	1	1	1	1	1	1	1	1	1	1	1	1	1	1	1	1	1	1	1	1	1	1	1	1	1	1	1	1	1
Points	3	6	9	12	15	15	18	19	22	25	28	31	32	35	38	41	44	45	48	51	54	57	60	63	66	69	72	75	76	79	82	83	86	89	89	92	93	94

Source: Serie A
A = Away; H = Home; W = Win; D = Draw; L = Loss
Notes:
- Positions show the situation at the end of the corresponding gameweeks (GW), not the position at the conclusion of matches or game days.

^{1} Matchday 21 (vs Atalanta) was postponed to 28 February 2024 due to Inter's participation in the 2023 Supercoppa Italiana.

==== Matches ====
The league fixtures were announced on 5 July 2023.

19 August 2023 1	Internazionale	2–0	Monza	Milan
20:45 CEST (UTC+2)	Martínez 8', 76', (yellow card) 32'	Report	Caldirola (yellow card) 41'	Stadium: San Siro; Attendance: 72,509; Referee: Andrea Colombo

28 August 2023 2	Cagliari	0–2	Internazionale	Cagliari
20:45 CEST (UTC+2)	Luvumbo (yellow card) 81'	Report	Dumfries 21'; Martínez 30'; Mkhitaryan (yellow card) 81'	Stadium: Unipol Domus; Attendance: 16,412; Referee: Michael Fabbri

3 September 2023 3	Internazionale	4–0	Fiorentina	Milan
18:30 CEST (UTC+2)	Thuram 23'; Barella (yellow card) 45+6'; Martínez 53', 73'; Çalhanoğlu 58' (pen.)	Report	Ranieri (yellow card) 39'	Stadium: San Siro; Attendance: 72,739; Referee: Matteo Marchetti

16 September 2023 4	Internazionale	5–1	Milan	Milan
18:00 CEST (UTC+2)	Mkhitaryan 5', 69'; Thuram 38'; Çalhanoğlu (yellow card) 72', (goal) 79' (pen.); Frattesi 90+3', (yellow card) 90+4'	Report	Thiaw (yellow card) 24'; Leão 57'; Hernandez (yellow card) 61'	Stadium: San Siro; Attendance: 75,571; Referee: Simone Sozza

24 September 2023 5	Empoli	0–1	Internazionale	Empoli
12:30 CEST (UTC+2)	Pezzella (yellow card) 33'; Maleh (yellow card) 62'	Report	Acerbi (yellow card) 26'; Dimarco 51'; Bastoni (yellow card) 65'	Stadium: Stadio Carlo Castellani; Attendance: 15,651; Referee: Matteo Marcenaro

27 September 2023 6	Internazionale	1–2	Sassuolo	Milan
20:45 CEST (UTC+2)	Dumfries 45+1'	Report	Bajrami 54'; Berardi 63'; Matheus Henrique (yellow card) 74'	Stadium: San Siro; Attendance: 70,864; Referee: Luca Massimi

30 September 2023 7	Salernitana	0–4	Internazionale	Salerno
20:45 CEST (UTC+2)	Cabral (yellow card) 60'; Gyömbér (yellow card) 69'	Report	Çalhanoğlu (yellow card) 25'; Martínez 62', 77', 85' (pen.), 89'	Stadium: Stadio Arechi; Attendance: 28,085; Referee: Rosario Abisso

7 October 2023 8	Internazionale	2–2	Bologna	Milan
15:00 CEST (UTC+2)	Acerbi 11'; Martínez 13', (yellow card) 58'; Bastoni (yellow card) 90'	Report	Orsolini 19' (pen.); Ndoye (yellow card) 33'; Zirkzee 52'; Beukema (yellow card) 90+3'; Ferguson (yellow card) 90+4'	Stadium: San Siro; Attendance: 74,072; Referee: Marco Guida

21 October 2023 9	Torino	0–3	Internazionale	Turin
18:00 CEST (UTC+2)	Linetty (yellow card) 80'	Report	Barella (yellow card) 49'; Thuram 59'; Martínez 67'; Çalhanoğlu 90+5' (pen.); Carlos Augusto (yellow card) 90+6'	Stadium: Stadio Olimpico Grande Torino; Attendance: 26,193; Referee: Matteo Marchetti

29 October 2023 10	Internazionale	1–0	Roma	Milan
18:00 CET (UTC+1)	Pavard (yellow card) 33'; Çalhanoğlu (yellow card) 56'; Bastoni (yellow card) 64'; Thuram 81'	Report	Mancini (yellow card) 13'; Ndicka (yellow card) 47'; Paredes (yellow card) 50'; Cristante (yellow card) 68'	Stadium: San Siro; Attendance: 75,573; Referee: Fabio Maresca

4 November 2023 11	Atalanta	1–2	Internazionale	Bergamo
18:00 CET (UTC+1)	De Roon (yellow card) 26'; Kolašinac (yellow card) 35'; Scamacca 61'; Tolói (yellow card) 86' (yellow-red card) 90+2'	Report	Çalhanoğlu 40' (pen.); Martínez 57'; Dumfries (yellow card) 89'	Stadium: Gewiss Stadium; Attendance: 14,945; Referee: Simone Sozza

12 November 2023 12	Internazionale	2–0	Frosinone	Milan
20:45 CET (UTC+1)	Dimarco 43'; Çalhanoğlu 48' (pen.)	Report	Brescianini (yellow card) 71'	Stadium: San Siro; Attendance: 70,816; Referee: Federico Dionisi

26 November 2023 13	Juventus	1–1	Internazionale	Turin
20:45 CET (UTC+1)	Cambiaso (yellow card) 11'; Vlahović 27'; Kostić (yellow card) 79'	Report	Martínez 33'; Cuadrado (yellow card) 75'	Stadium: Juventus Stadium; Attendance: 41,507; Referee: Marco Guida

3 December 2023 14	Napoli	0–3	Internazionale	Naples
20:45 CET (UTC+1)	Elmas (yellow card) 58'; Rrahmani (yellow card) 73'	Report	Çalhanoğlu 44'; Barella 61'; Darmian (yellow card) 78'; Thuram 85', (yellow card) 85'	Stadium: Stadio Diego Armando Maradona; Attendance: 51,000; Referee: Davide Massa

9 December 2023 15	Internazionale	4–0	Udinese	Milan
20:45 CET (UTC+1)	Çalhanoğlu 37' (pen.); Dimarco 42'; Thuram 44'; Martínez 84'	Report	Ferreira (yellow card) 13'	Stadium: San Siro; Attendance: 71,874; Referee: Marco Di Bello

17 December 2023 16	Lazio	0–2	Internazionale	Rome
20:45 CET (UTC+1)	Casale (yellow card) 81'; Lazzari (red card) 86'	Report	Thuram (yellow card) 26', (goal) 66'; Martínez 40'; Barella (yellow card) 61'	Stadium: Stadio Olimpico; Attendance: 59,000; Referee: Fabio Maresca

23 December 2023 17	Internazionale	2–0	Lecce	Milan
18:00 CET (UTC+1)	Çalhanoğlu (yellow card) 30'; Bisseck 43'; Barella 78'	Report	González (yellow card) 15'; Piccoli (yellow card) 64'; Pongračić (yellow card) 74'; Banda (red card) 83'	Stadium: San Siro; Attendance: 72,723; Referee: Matteo Marcenaro

29 December 2023 18	Genoa	1–1	Internazionale	Genoa
20:45 CET (UTC+1)	Drăgușin 45+7', (yellow card) 69'; Guðmundsson (yellow card) 67'	Report	Arnautović 42'; Barella (yellow card) 77'; Mkhitaryan (yellow card) 86'	Stadium: Stadio Luigi Ferraris; Attendance: 33,249; Referee: Daniele Doveri

6 January 2024 19	Internazionale	2–1	Hellas Verona	Milan
12:30 CET (UTC+1)	Martínez 13'; Frattesi 90+3'	Report	Henry 74', (penalty missed) 90+10'; Coppola (yellow card) 77'; Suslov (yellow card) 78'; Lazović (red card) 90+5'	Stadium: San Siro; Attendance: 71,691; Referee: Michael Fabbri

13 January 2024 20	Monza	1–5	Internazionale	Monza
20:45 CET (UTC+1)	Colpani (yellow card) 5'; Pessina 69' (pen.); Birindelli (yellow card) 70'	Report	Çalhanoğlu 12' (pen.), 60', (yellow card) 58'; Martínez 14', 84' (pen.); Pavard (yellow card) 77'; Thuram 88'	Stadium: Stadio Brianteo; Attendance: 14,670; Referee: Antonio Rapuano

28 January 2024 22	Fiorentina	0–1	Internazionale	Florence
20:45 CET (UTC+1)	Ikoné (yellow card) 45+2'; González (penalty missed) 76'; Mandragora (yellow card) 90+1'	Report	Martínez 14'; Bastoni (yellow card) 42'; Sommer (yellow card) 75'; Pavard (yellow card) 82'	Stadium: Stadio Artemio Franchi; Attendance: 35,084; Referee: Gianluca Aureliano

4 February 2024 23	Internazionale	1–0	Juventus	Milan
20:45 CET (UTC+1)	Gatti 37' (o.g.); Mkhitaryan (yellow card) 51'; Thuram (yellow card) 77'	Report	Vlahović (yellow card) 18'; Danilo (yellow card) 32'	Stadium: San Siro; Attendance: 75,547; Referee: Fabio Maresca

10 February 2024 24	Roma	2–4	Internazionale	Rome
18:00 CET (UTC+1)	Mancini 28', (yellow card) 47'; El Shaarawy 44'; Huijsen (yellow card) 90+2'	Report	Acerbi 17'; Thuram 49'; Angeliño 56' (o.g.); Bastoni 90+3'	Stadium: Stadio Olimpico; Attendance: 65,044; Referee: Marco Guida

16 February 2024 25	Internazionale	4–0	Salernitana	Milan
21:00 CET (UTC+1)	Thuram 17'; Martínez 19'; Dumfries 40'; Arnautović 90'	Report	Tchaouna (yellow card) 71'	Stadium: San Siro; Attendance: 72,609; Referee: Marco Piccinini

25 February 2024 26	Lecce	0–4	Internazionale	Lecce
18:00 CET (UTC+1)	Sansone (yellow card) 3'	Report	Martínez 15', 56'; Asllani (yellow card) 38'; Frattesi 54'; Mkhitaryan (yellow card) 63'; De Vrij 67'	Stadium: Stadio Via del mare Attendance: 27,910; Referee: Daniele Doveri

28 February 2024 21	Internazionale	4–0	Atalanta	Milan
20:45 CET (UTC+1)	Darmian (yellow card) 22', (goal) 26'; Martínez 45+1', (penalty missed) 54'; Dimarco 54'; Frattesi 71'; Bastoni (yellow card) 76'	Report	Éderson (yellow card) 45'; Djimsiti (yellow card) 53'; Hien (yellow card) 65'; Bakker (yellow card) 71'; Touré (yellow card) 89'; Lookman (yellow card) 90+5'	Stadium: San Siro; Attendance: 71,422; Referee: Andrea Colombo
Note: The match was originally scheduled for 21 January 2024, but was postponed due to Internazionale's participation in the 2023 Supercoppa Italiana.

4 March 2024 27	Internazionale	2–1	Genoa	Milan
20:45 CET (UTC+1)	Dumfries (yellow card) 22'; Asllani 30'; Sánchez 38' (pen.); Martínez (yellow card) 69'	Report	Frendrup (yellow card) 20'; Strootman (yellow card) 47'; Vásquez 54', (yellow card) 61'	Stadium: San Siro; Attendance: 75,421; Referee: Giovanni Ayroldi

9 March 2024 28	Bologna	0–1	Internazionale	Bologna
18:00 CET (UTC+1)	Zirkzee (yellow card) 25'; Freuler (yellow card) 47'	Report	Bisseck 37'; Klaassen (yellow card) 81'	Stadium: Stadio Renato Dall'Ara; Attendance: 30,204; Referee: Luca Pairetto

17 March 2024 29	Internazionale	1–1	Napoli	Milan
20:45 CET (UTC+1)	Pavard (yellow card) 36'; Darmian 43'; Barella (yellow card) 54'	Report	Lobotka (yellow card) 52'; Juan Jesus 81'	Stadium: San Siro; Attendance: 71,551; Referee: Federico La Penna

1 April 2024 30	Internazionale	2–0	Empoli	Milan
20:45 CEST (UTC+2)	Dimarco 6'; Sánchez 81'	Report	Cambiaghi (yellow card) 66'; Cacace (yellow card) 89'	Stadium: San Siro; Attendance: 71,551; Referee: Federico Dionisi

8 April 2024 31	Udinese	1–2	Internazionale	Udine
20:45 CEST (UTC+2)	Samardžić 40'; Pereyra (yellow card) 78'	Report	Çalhanoğlu 55' (pen.); Pavard (yellow card) 90+2'; Martínez (yellow card) 90+3'; Frattesi 90+5'	Stadium: Stadio Friuli; Attendance: 24,993; Referee: Marco Piccinini

14 April 2024 32	Internazionale	2–2	Cagliari	Milan
20:45 CEST (UTC+2)	Thuram 12'; Çalhanoğlu 74' (pen.)	Report	Prati (yellow card) 40'; Shomurodov 64'; Mina (yellow card) 73'; Viola 82'	Stadium: San Siro; Attendance: 72,559; Referee: Francesco Fourneau

22 April 2024 33	Milan	1–2	Internazionale	Milan
20:45 CEST (UTC+2)	Hernandez (yellow card) 37', (red card) 90+4'; Tomori 80', (yellow card) 90+2'; Gabbia (yellow card) 90'; Calabria (red card) 90+7'	Report	Acerbi 18'; Barella (yellow card) 22'; Martínez (yellow card) 32'; Thuram 49'; Dumfries (red card) 90+4'	Stadium: San Siro; Attendance: 75,554; Referee: Andrea Colombo

28 April 2024 34	Internazionale	2–0	Torino	Milan
12:30 CEST (UTC+2)	Çalahanoğlu 56', 60' (pen.)	Report	Tameze (red card) 49'	Stadium: San Siro; Attendance: 71,686; Referee: Maria Sole Ferrieri Caputi

4 May 2024 35	Sassuolo	1–0	Internazionale	Reggio Emilia
20:45 CEST (UTC+2)	Laurienté 20'; Boloca (yellow card) 90'	Report	Pavard (yellow card) 89'	Stadium: Mapei Stadium – Città del Tricolore; Attendance: 19,454; Referee: Matteo Marchetti

10 May 2024 36	Frosinone	0–5	Internazionale	Frosinone
20:45 CEST (UTC+2)		Report	Frattesi 19'; Arnautović 60'; Buchanan 77'; Martínez 80'; Thuram 84'	Stadium: Stadio Benito Stirpe; Attendance: 16,021; Referee: Antonio Giua

19 May 2024 37	Internazionale	1–1	Lazio	Milan
18:00 CEST (UTC+2)	Dumfries 87'	Report	Kamada 32'; Casale (yellow card) 52'	Stadium: San Siro; Attendance: 73,148; Referee: Juan Luca Sacchi

26 May 2024 38	Hellas Verona	2–2	Internazionale	Verona
20:45 CEST (UTC+2)	Noslin 17'; Cabal (yellow card) 30'; Suslov 37'	Report	Arnautović 10', 45+1'; Barella (yellow card) 61'	Stadium: Stadio Marcantonio Bentegodi; Attendance: 22,447; Referee: Luca Zufferli

=== Coppa Italia ===
20 December 2023 Round of 16	Internazionale	1–2 (a.e.t.)	Bologna	Milan
21:00 CET (UTC+1)	Martínez (penalty missed) 65'; Bisseck (yellow card) 90+5'; Carlos Augusto 92'; Darmian (yellow card) 100'; Pavard (yellow card) 103'; Barella (yellow card) 109'	Report	Lykogiannis (yellow card) 41'; Van Hooijdonk (yellow card) 58'; Fabbian (yellow card) 88'; Beukema 112'; Ndoye 116'	Stadium: San Siro; Attendance: 63,519; Referee: Federico La Penna

=== Supercoppa Italiana ===
19 January 2024 Semi-finals	Internazionale	3–0	Lazio	Riyadh, Saudi Arabia
22:00 SAST (UTC+3)	Thuram 17'; Çalhanoğlu 50' (pen.), (yellow card) 79'; Frattesi 87'	Report	Romagnoli (yellow card) 64'; Vecino (yellow card) 70'	Stadium: KSU Stadium; Attendance: 20,767; Referee: Matteo Marchetti

22 January 2024 Final	Napoli	0–1	Internazionale	Riyadh, Saudi Arabia
22:00 SAST (UTC+3)	Rrahmani (yellow card) 42'; Zerbin (yellow card) 46'; Simeone (yellow card) 55' (yellow-red card) 60'; Gaetano (yellow card) 90'	Report	Çalhanoğlu (yellow card) 44'; De Vrij (yellow card) 47'; Barella (yellow card) 55'; Martínez 90+1', (yellow card) 90+2'	Stadium: KSU Stadium; Attendance: 24,900; Referee: Antonio Rapuano

=== UEFA Champions League ===
==== Group stage ====
The draw for the group stage was held on 31 August 2023.

Pos	Team	Pld	W	D	L	GF	GA	GD	Pts	Qualification	RSO	INT	BEN	SAL
1	(Spain) Real Sociedad	6	3	3	0	7	2	+5	12 (Note: Tied on head-to-head points, goal difference, and goals scored. Goal difference in all matches: Real Sociedad +5, Inter Milan +3.)	Advance to knockout phase	—	1–1	3–1	0–0
2	(Italy) Inter Milan	6	3	3	0	8	5	+3	12	Advance to knockout phase	0–0	—	1–0	2–1
3	(Portugal) Benfica	6	1	1	4	7	11	−4	4 (Note: Tied on head-to-head points, goal difference, goals scored, and goal difference in all matches. Goals scored in all matches: Benfica 7, Red Bull Salzburg 4.)	Transfer to Europa League	0–1	3–3	—	0–2
4	(Austria) Red Bull Salzburg	6	1	1	4	4	8	−4	4		0–2	0–1	1–3	—

Source: UEFA
Rules for classification: Group stage tiebreakers
Notes:

20 September 2023 1	Real Sociedad (Spain)	1–1	(Italy) Internazionale	San Sebastián, Spain
21:00 CEST (UTC+2)	Méndez 4'; Merino (yellow card) 70'; Traoré (yellow card) 88'; Zubeldia (yellow card) 90+5'	Report	Asllani (yellow card) 13'; Mkhitaryan (yellow card) 60'; Frattesi (yellow card) 70'; Martínez 87'	Stadium: Anoeta; Attendance: 36,591; Referee: Michael Oliver (England)

3 October 2023 2	Internazionale (Italy)	1–0	(Portugal) Benfica	Milan, Italy
21:00 CEST (UTC+2)	Thuram 62'; Martínez (yellow card) 67'; Barella (yellow card) 68'; Dumfries (yellow card) 70'; Asllani (yellow card) 90+5'	Report		Stadium: San Siro; Attendance: 66,573; Referee: Danny Makkelie (Netherlands)

24 October 2023 3	Internazionale (Italy)	2–1	(Austria) Red Bull Salzburg	Milan, Italy
18:45 CEST (UTC+2)	Sánchez 19'; Mkhitaryan (yellow card) 28'; Çalhanoğlu 64' (pen.)	Report	Šimić (yellow card) 23'; Gourna-Douath (yellow card) 29'; Gloukh 57'	Stadium: San Siro; Attendance: 71,825; Referee: François Letexier (France)

8 November 2023 4	Red Bull Salzburg (Austria)	0–1	(Italy) Internazionale	Salzburg, Austria
21:00 CET (UTC+1)	Pavlović (yellow card) 51'; Gloukh (yellow card) 75'	Report	Bisseck (yellow card) 27'; Çalhanoğlu (yellow card) 49'; Martínez 85' (pen.)	Stadium: Red Bull Arena; Attendance: 30,071; Referee: Serdar Gözübüyük (Netherlands)

29 November 2023 5	Benfica (Portugal)	3–3	(Italy) Internazionale	Lisbon, Portugal
20:00 WET (UTC+0)	João Mário 5', 13', 34', (yellow card) 72'; Morato (yellow card) 78'; A. Silva (red card) 84'	Report	Arnautović 51'; Frattesi 58'; Sánchez 72' (pen.); Cuadrado (yellow card) 76'	Stadium: Estádio da Luz; Attendance: 52,944; Referee: Andris Treimanis (Latvia)

12 December 2023 6	Internazionale (Italy)	0–0	(Spain) Real Sociedad	Milan, Italy
21:00 CET (UTC+1)	Martínez (yellow card) 75'	Report	Zubeldia (yellow card) 21'; Zakharyan (yellow card) 44'; Kubo (yellow card) 76'; Elustondo (yellow card) 85'	Stadium: San Siro; Attendance: 69,010; Referee: Sandro Schärer (Switzerland)

==== Knockout phase ====
===== Round of 16 =====
The draw for the round of 16 was held on 18 December 2023.

20 February 2024 First leg	Internazionale (Italy)	1–0	(Spain) Atlético Madrid	Milan, Italy
21:00 CET (UTC+1)	Arnautović 79'; Frattesi (yellow card) 86'; Carlos Augusto (yellow card) 90+4'	Report	Hermoso (yellow card) 53'; Savić (yellow card) 82'; Morata (yellow card) 84'; Koke (yellow card) 90+2'	Stadium: San Siro; Attendance: 73,709; Referee: István Kovács (Romania)

13 March 2024 Second leg	Atlético Madrid (Spain)	2–1 (a.e.t.) (2–2 agg.) (3–2 p)	(Italy) Internazionale	Madrid, Spain
21:00 CET (UTC+1)	Griezmann 35'; Hermoso (yellow card) 41'; Depay 87'; Koke (yellow card) 90'	Report	Dimarco 33'; Çalhanoğlu (yellow card) 104'; Acerbi (yellow card) 105+2'; Bisseck (yellow card) 118'	Stadium: Metropolitano Stadium; Attendance: 69,196; Referee: Szymon Marciniak (Poland)
	Penalties
	Depay (penalty scored); Saúl (penalty missed); Riquelme (penalty scored); Correa (penalty scored)		(penalty scored) Çalhanoğlu; (penalty missed) Sánchez; (penalty missed) Klaassen; (penalty scored) Acerbi; (penalty missed) Martínez

== Statistics ==
As of match played 26 May 2024

=== Appearances and goals ===
No.	Pos	Nat	Player	Total		Serie A		Coppa Italia		Supercoppa Italiana		Champions League	
No.	Pos	Nat	Player	Apps	Goals	Apps	Goals	Apps	Goals	Apps	Goals	Apps	Goals
Goalkeepers
1	GK	(Switzerland) SUI	Yann Sommer	43	0	34	0	0	0	2	0	7	0
12	GK	(Italy) ITA	Raffaele Di Gennaro	1	0	0+1	0	0	0	0	0	0	0
77	GK	(Italy) ITA	Emil Audero	6	0	4	0	1	0	0	0	1	0
Defenders
6	DF	(Netherlands) NED	Stefan de Vrij	33	1	17+8	1	0	0	1+1	0	5+1	0
15	DF	(Italy) ITA	Francesco Acerbi	38	3	26+3	3	1	0	2	0	4+2	0
28	DF	(France) FRA	Benjamin Pavard	31	0	21+2	0	0+1	0	2	0	5	0
31	DF	(Germany) GER	Yann Aurel Bisseck	21	2	9+7	2	1	0	0+1	0	2+1	0
32	DF	(Italy) ITA	Federico Dimarco	40	6	29+1	5	0+1	0	2	0	4+3	1
36	DF	(Italy) ITA	Matteo Darmian	43	2	27+6	2	1	0	2	0	4+3	0
95	DF	(Italy) ITA	Alessandro Bastoni	37	1	28	1	1	0	1	0	6+1	0
Midfielders
2	MF	(Netherlands) NED	Denzel Dumfries	36	4	19+12	4	0	0	0	0	4+1	0
5	MF	(Italy) ITA	Stefano Sensi	5	0	0+4	0	0+1	0	0	0	0	0
7	MF	(Colombia) COL	Juan Cuadrado	12	0	0+10	0	0	0	0	0	1+1	0
14	MF	(Netherlands) NED	Davy Klaassen	18	0	1+12	0	1	0	0	0	1+3	0
16	MF	(Italy) ITA	Davide Frattesi	42	8	6+26	6	1	0	0+2	1	4+3	1
17	MF	(Canada) CAN	Tajon Buchanan	10	1	0+10	1	0	0	0	0	0	0
20	MF	(Turkey) TUR	Hakan Çalhanoğlu	40	15	32	13	0	0	2	1	6	1
21	MF	(Albania) ALB	Kristjan Asllani	31	1	6+17	1	1	0	0+1	0	2+4	0
22	MF	(Armenia) ARM	Henrikh Mkhitaryan	46	2	35+1	2	0+1	0	2	0	7	0
23	MF	(Italy) ITA	Nicolò Barella	48	2	34+3	2	0+1	0	2	0	4+4	0
30	MF	(Brazil) BRA	Carlos Augusto	46	1	14+23	0	1	1	0+1	0	5+2	0
41	MF	(Nigeria) NGR	Ebenezer Akinsanmiro	1	0	0+1	0	0	0	0	0	0	0
Forwards
8	FW	(Austria) AUT	Marko Arnautović	34	7	5+22	5	1	0	0+2	0	2+2	2
9	FW	(France) FRA	Marcus Thuram	46	15	34+1	13	0+1	0	2	1	5+3	1
10	FW	(Argentina) ARG	Lautaro Martínez	44	27	31+2	24	1	0	2	1	5+3	2
70	FW	(Chile) CHI	Alexis Sánchez	33	4	6+17	2	0	0	0+2	0	4+4	2
Players transferred out during the season
42	MF	(France) FRA	Lucien Agoumé	1	0	0+1	0	0	0	0	0	0	0

Source: Competitions

=== Goalscorers ===
Rank	No.	Pos.	Player	Serie A	Coppa Italia	Supercoppa Italiana	Champions League	Total
1	10	FW	(Argentina) Lautaro Martínez	24	0	1	2	27
2	9	FW	(France) Marcus Thuram	13	0	1	1	15
2	20	MF	(Turkey) Hakan Çalhanoğlu	13	0	1	1	15
4	16	MF	(Italy) Davide Frattesi	6	0	1	1	8
5	8	FW	(Austria) Marko Arnautović	5	0	0	2	7
6	32	DF	(Italy) Federico Dimarco	5	0	0	1	6
7	2	MF	(Netherlands) Denzel Dumfries	4	0	0	0	4
7	70	FW	(Chile) Alexis Sánchez	2	0	0	2	4
9	15	DF	(Italy) Francesco Acerbi	3	0	0	0	3
10	22	MF	(Armenia) Henrikh Mkhitaryan	2	0	0	0	2
10	23	MF	(Italy) Nicolò Barella	2	0	0	0	2
10	31	DF	(Germany) Yann Aurel Bisseck	2	0	0	0	2
10	36	DF	(Italy) Matteo Darmian	2	0	0	0	2
14	6	DF	(Netherlands) Stefan de Vrij	1	0	0	0	1
14	17	MF	(Canada) Tajon Buchanan	1	0	0	0	1
14	21	MF	(Albania) Kristjan Asllani	1	0	0	0	1
14	30	MF	(Brazil) Carlos Augusto	0	1	0	0	1
14	95	DF	(Italy) Alessandro Bastoni	1	0	0	0	1
Own goals				2	0	0	0	2
Totals				89	1	4	10	104

=== Assists ===
Rank	No.	Pos.	Player	Serie A	Coppa Italia	Supercoppa Italiana	Champions League	Total
1	22	MF	(Armenia) Henrikh Mkhitaryan	8	0	1	0	9
2	32	DF	(Italy) Federico Dimarco	6	1	1	0	8
3	9	FW	(France) Marcus Thuram	7	0	0	0	7
4	2	MF	(Netherlands) Denzel Dumfries	4	0	0	1	5
4	16	MF	(Italy) Davide Frattesi	3	0	0	2	5
4	70	FW	(Chile) Alexis Sánchez	5	0	0	0	5
7	23	MF	(Italy) Nicolò Barella	3	0	0	1	4
8	8	FW	(Austria) Marko Arnautović	3	0	0	0	3
8	10	FW	(Argentina) Lautaro Martínez	3	0	0	0	3
8	20	MF	(Turkey) Hakan Çalhanoğlu	3	0	0	0	3
8	28	DF	(France) Benjamin Pavard	2	0	1	0	3
8	30	MF	(Brazil) Carlos Augusto	3	0	0	0	3
8	95	DF	(Italy) Alessandro Bastoni	3	0	0	0	3
14	7	MF	(Colombia) Juan Cuadrado	2	0	0	0	2
14	15	DF	(Italy) Francesco Acerbi	1	0	0	1	2
14	21	MF	(Albania) Kristjan Asllani	2	0	0	0	2
17	5	MF	(Italy) Stefano Sensi	1	0	0	0	1
17	36	DF	(Italy) Matteo Darmian	1	0	0	0	1
Totals				60	1	3	5	69

=== Hat-tricks ===
Player	Against	Result	Date	Competition	Ref.
(Argentina) Lautaro Martínez^{4}	Salernitana (A)	4–0	30 September 2023	Serie A	

^{4} – Player scored four goals.

=== Clean sheets ===
Rank	No.	Pos.	Player	Serie A	Coppa Italia	Supercoppa Italiana	Champions League	Total
1	1	GK	(Switzerland) Yann Sommer	19	0	2	4	25
2	77	GK	(Italy) Emil Audero	2	0	0	0	2
Totals				21	0	2	4	27

=== Disciplinary record ===
No.	Pos.	Player	Serie A			Coppa Italia			Supercoppa Italiana			Champions League			Total		
No.	Pos.	Player	Yellow card	Yellow-red card	Red card	Yellow card	Yellow-red card	Red card	Yellow card	Yellow-red card	Red card	Yellow card	Yellow-red card	Red card	Yellow card	Yellow-red card	Red card
1	GK	(Switzerland) Yann Sommer	1	0	0	0	0	0	0	0	0	0	0	0	1	0	0
2	MF	(Netherlands) Denzel Dumfries	2	0	1	0	0	0	0	0	0	1	0	0	3	0	1
6	DF	(Netherlands) Stefan de Vrij	0	0	0	0	0	0	1	0	0	0	0	0	1	0	0
7	MF	(Colombia) Juan Cuadrado	1	0	0	0	0	0	0	0	0	1	0	0	2	0	0
9	FW	(France) Marcus Thuram	3	0	0	0	0	0	0	0	0	0	0	0	3	0	0
10	FW	(Argentina) Lautaro Martínez	5	0	0	0	0	0	1	0	0	2	0	0	8	0	0
14	MF	(Netherlands) Davy Klaassen	1	0	0	0	0	0	0	0	0	0	0	0	1	0	0
15	DF	(Italy) Francesco Acerbi	1	0	0	0	0	0	0	0	0	1	0	0	2	0	0
16	MF	(Italy) Davide Frattesi	1	0	0	0	0	0	0	0	0	2	0	0	3	0	0
20	MF	(Turkey) Hakan Çalhanoğlu	5	0	0	0	0	0	2	0	0	2	0	0	9	0	0
21	MF	(Albania) Kristjan Asllani	1	0	0	0	0	0	0	0	0	2	0	0	3	0	0
22	MF	(Armenia) Henrikh Mkhitaryan	4	0	0	0	0	0	0	0	0	2	0	0	6	0	0
23	MF	(Italy) Nicolò Barella	7	0	0	1	0	0	1	0	0	1	0	0	10	0	0
28	DF	(France) Benjamin Pavard	6	0	0	1	0	0	0	0	0	0	0	0	7	0	0
30	MF	(Brazil) Carlos Augusto	1	0	0	0	0	0	0	0	0	1	0	0	2	0	0
31	DF	(Germany) Yann Aurel Bisseck	0	0	0	1	0	0	0	0	0	2	0	0	3	0	0
36	DF	(Italy) Matteo Darmian	2	0	0	1	0	0	0	0	0	0	0	0	3	0	0
95	DF	(Italy) Alessandro Bastoni	5	0	0	0	0	0	0	0	0	0	0	0	5	0	0
Totals			46	0	1	4	0	0	5	0	0	17	0	0	72	0	1

== Awards ==
=== Monthly awards ===
Serie A Coach of the Month

Month	Winner	Ref.
October	(Italy) Simone Inzaghi	
January	(Italy) Simone Inzaghi	
April	(Italy) Simone Inzaghi	

Serie A Player of the Month

Month	Winner	Ref.
October	(Argentina) Lautaro Martínez	
March	(Italy) Alessandro Bastoni	

Serie A Goal of the Month

Month	Winner	Opponents	Date	Ref.
September	(France) Marcus Thuram	Milan	16 September 2023	
November	(Italy) Federico Dimarco	Frosinone	12 November 2023	

LeoVegas.News Player of the Month

Awarded by an online supporters vote on LeoVegas.News' Instagram profile.

Month	Winner	Ref.
Aug. - Sep.	(Argentina) Lautaro Martínez	
October	(France) Marcus Thuram	
November	(Argentina) Lautaro Martínez	
December	(Germany) Yann Aurel Bisseck	
January	(Argentina) Lautaro Martínez	
February	(Argentina) Lautaro Martínez	
March	(Italy) Alessandro Bastoni	
April	(Turkey) Hakan Çalhanoğlu	
May	(France) Marcus Thuram	

Goal of the Month sponsored by Pirelli

Awarded by an online supporters vote on Inter's Instagram profile.

Month	Winner	Opponents	Date	Ref.
September	(France) Marcus Thuram	Milan	16 September 2023	
October	(Argentina) Lautaro Martínez	Bologna	7 October 2024	
November	(Italy) Federico Dimarco	Frosinone	12 November 2023	
December	(Italy) Nicolò Barella	Napoli	3 December 2023	
January	(Italy) Davide Frattesi	Hellas Verona	6 January 2024	
February	(Argentina) Lautaro Martínez	Atalanta	28 February 2024	
March	(Albania) Kristjan Asllani	Genoa	4 March 2024	
April	(France) Marcus Thuram	Milan	22 April 2024	
May	(Canada) Tajon Buchanan	Frosinone	10 May 2024	

=== Seasonal awards ===
Serie A Awards

Award	Winner	Ref.
Most Valuable Player	(Argentina) Lautaro Martínez	
Best Defender	(Italy) Alessandro Bastoni	
Best Midfielder	(Turkey) Hakan Çalhanoğlu	
Coach of the Season	(Italy) Simone Inzaghi	

Gran Galà del Calcio

- Individual awards

Award	Winner	Ref.
Footballer of the Year	(Argentina) Lautaro Martínez	
Coach of the Year	(Italy) Simone Inzaghi	
Goal of the Year	(France) Marcus Thuram	
Club of the Year	Inter Milan	

- Serie A Team of the Year

Pos.	Player	Ref.
GK	(Switzerland) Yann Sommer	
DF	(Italy) Alessandro Bastoni	
DF	(Italy) Federico Dimarco	
MF	(Italy) Nicolò Barella	
MF	(Turkey) Hakan Çalhanoğlu	
FW	(Argentina) Lautaro Martínez	
FW	(France) Marcus Thuram	

Serie A top scorer

Player	Goals	Ref.
(Argentina) Lautaro Martínez	24	

Enzo Bearzot Award

Winner	Ref.
(Italy) Simone Inzaghi	

Premio Bulgarelli Number 8

Award	Winner	Ref.
Best Serie A Coach	(Italy) Simone Inzaghi	

U-Power Goal of the Season

Awarded by an online supporters vote.

Winner	Opponents	Date	Ref.
(France) Marcus Thuram	Milan	16 September 2023	
