= Botis (surname) =

Botis is a surname. Notable people with the surname include:

- Nikolaos Botis (born 2004), Greek footballer
- Sorin Botiş (born 1978), Romanian football player
