= Matteo Darmian =

Italian footballer (born 1989)

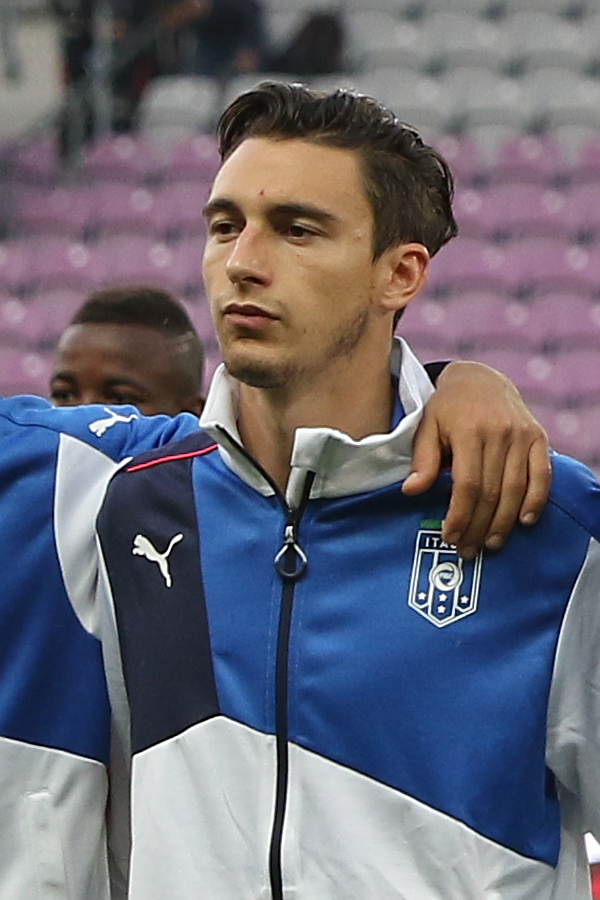
- Darmian with Italy in 2015

Personal information
- Full name: Matteo Darmian
- Date of birth: 2 December 1989 (age 36)
- Place of birth: Legnano, Italy
- Height: 1.82 m (6 ft 0 in)
- Positions: Full-back; wing-back

Team information
- Current team: Bologna
- Number: 36

Youth career
- 2000–2007: AC Milan

Senior career*
Years	Team	Apps	(Gls)
2006–2010	AC Milan	4	(0)
2009–2010	→ Padova (loan)	20	(1)
2010–2011	Palermo	11	(0)
2011–2015	Torino	133	(3)
2015–2019	Manchester United	60	(1)
2019–2021	Parma	36	(1)
2020–2021	→ Inter Milan (loan)	26	(4)
2021–2026	Inter Milan	124	(7)
2026–	Bologna	2	(0)

International career
2006	Italy U17	7	(0)
2006–2007	Italy U18	5	(0)
2007–2008	Italy U19	10	(0)
2008–2010	Italy U20	9	(0)
2009	Italy U21	1	(0)
2014–2024	Italy	46	(2)
Medal record
Men's football
Representing Italy
UEFA Nations League
Third place	2023 Netherlands
- * Club domestic league appearances and goals as of 17 October 2026 (UTC)

Matteo Darmian (born 2 December 1989) is an Italian professional footballer who plays as a full-back or wing-back for Serie A club Bologna.

He began his career at AC Milan, making his senior debut in 2006 at the age of 16 and Serie A debut in 2007 at the age of 17. In 2009, he joined Padova on loan, whom he helped avoid relegation from Serie B in his only season there. He then signed for Palermo in 2010, and one year later joined Torino, where he played for four seasons. He moved to Manchester United in July 2015, and in four years there, won the FA Cup and UEFA Europa League, before joining Parma in 2019. He signed a season-long loan deal with Inter in October 2020, who made the transfer permanent in February 2021. That season ended with Darmian winning the Serie A title, a first league championship of his career.

Darmian made his senior debut for the Italy national team in May 2014, and represented his nation at the 2014 FIFA World Cup, UEFA Euro 2016 and Euro 2024.

== Early life ==
Darmian grew up playing football in the main square in Rescaldina and was trained by his father, Giovanni, who was one of the coaches of Oratorio team, US CARCOR, where players such as Marco Simone and Luigi Pogliana also played. He often played as a central or defensive midfielder in his youth. His first real break came when he was spotted by Beniamino Abate, a former goalkeeper tasked with scouting Lombardy for young talent by AC Milan.

== Club career ==
=== AC Milan ===
In 2000, Darmian joined Milan's youth system. He made his first-team debut for the Rossoneri on 28 November 2006, aged only 16, in the Coppa Italia against Brescia, replacing Kakha Kaladze at half-time.

He made his Serie A debut at the age of 17, in Milan's 3–2 defeat against Udinese on 19 May 2007, when he entered in the 67th minute to replace Giuseppe Favalli. During the 2007–08 season he became the leader and captain of the youth team, collecting another appearance for the first-team in the Coppa Italia. The following season, the 19-year-old defender collected an additional three league appearances. He ended his experience at Milan with four appearances in the top flight.

==== Padova (loan) ====
On 17 July 2009, Darmian moved to Serie B club Padova on loan until the end of the 2009–10 season. He made his official debut for the club on 28 November 2009, in a home loss against Vicenza. He went on to make 20 appearances and score one goal, as Padova finished the season in 19th place and subsequently won the relegation play-off against Triestina.

=== Palermo ===
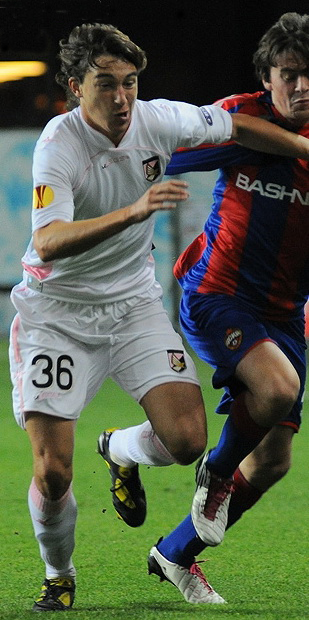
Darmian playing for Palermo against CSKA Moscow in 2010

On 11 July 2010, it was announced that Matteo Darmian would join Palermo's pre-season training camp in Austria, after Milan and the Sicilian Serie A club agreed in principle about a transfer move involving him. The move, unveiled as a co-ownership bid, was officially announced by Palermo the next day. The fee was €800,000. Darmian made his debut for the Rosanero on 16 September 2010, in a Europa League game against Sparta Prague, which also earned him his debut in European competition. His Palermo league debut was during the fourth game of the season, coming on for Javier Pastore in a 3–1 win against Juventus. On 6 February 2011, he played his first game as a starter in the league in a 4–2 victory for Palermo away at Lecce, but was substituted in the 33rd minute due to injury. He finished the season with 16 appearances among Serie A, Europa League and Coppa Italia.

=== Torino ===
After Milan and Palermo renewed the co-ownership on 23 June 2011, he was officially loaned to Serie B side Torino on 12 July 2011. He made his debut for the Granata on 13 August 2011, in the second round of Coppa Italia against Lumezzane; and scored his first goal on 30 October 2011, against Empoli, allowing his team to win 2–1. On 13 November 2011, he was injured against Bari and sidelined for five games. At the end of the season, he was promoted to Serie A, having played 33 games in the league and one in the Coppa Italia.

On 20 June 2012, Palermo redeemed its 50% share from Milan for €500,000 and on 5 July 2012, his return to Torino was formulised under a co-ownership agreement for €825,000. With Torino he played 30 games in Serie A and two in the Coppa Italia. On 20 June 2013, Torino redeemed the remainder of his contract from Palermo for €1.5 million.

In the 2013–14 season, he played 37 games in Serie A for Torino, who finished 7th and qualified for the Europa League after Parma failed to obtain a UEFA license. He featured in the Serie A Team of the Year, along with teammate, Ciro Immobile. On 18 May 2014, he made his 100th appearance for Torino during the 2–2 draw away to Fiorentina.

In his first appearance of the 2014–15 season, on 7 August 2014, he scored his first goal in European competition, in a 4–0 victory against Sweden's IF Brommapojkarna, in the second leg of the 2014–15 Europa League third qualifying round. On 29 October 2014, he scored his first goal in Serie A to secure a 1–0 win over Parma, before returning to the score-sheet on 11 December 2014 in the Europa League group stage, won 5–1 away at Copenhagen. On 26 February 2015, he scored the match-winner against Athletic Bilbao, qualifying Torino for the round of 16 after a historic 3–2 victory in Spain. He concluded the season with 47 appearances and five goals between Serie A, Europe and the Coppa Italia.

In total, he played 151 matches and scored six goals for Torino.

=== Manchester United ===
==== 2015–16 season ====
On 11 July 2015, Darmian signed for English club Manchester United for an undisclosed fee, believed to be £12.7 million. He signed a four-year contract with an option to extend it for a further year. He made his debut for the club against Club América during preseason on 17 July, playing the first 45 minutes, with United winning 1–0. He made his Premier League debut on 8 August 2015 as the season opened with a 1–0 victory against Tottenham Hotspur at Old Trafford, with manager Louis van Gaal selecting his performance as the best of the match. On 10 September, Darmian earned his first official accolade at the club, after he was voted Manchester United's August 2015 player of the month. "It's important to know this is from the fans," Matteo told United's official website. "I want to thank them. I am happy. I also want to thank my team-mates and everyone at the club for making me feel welcome."

In April 2016, Darmian scored his only Premier League goal for Manchester United, a powerful volley from the edge of the penalty area, in the 55th minute of a 2–0 victory against Crystal Palace. He was presented with the club's man of the match award for his performance in this fixture and hailed his strike as the best goal of his career to date. His cross, in the fourth minute of play, had also previously forced an own goal from Damien Delaney. Darmian featured in the 2016 FA Cup Final against Crystal Palace on 21 May, coming on in the 66th minute for Marcos Rojo, helping United achieve a 2–1 victory.

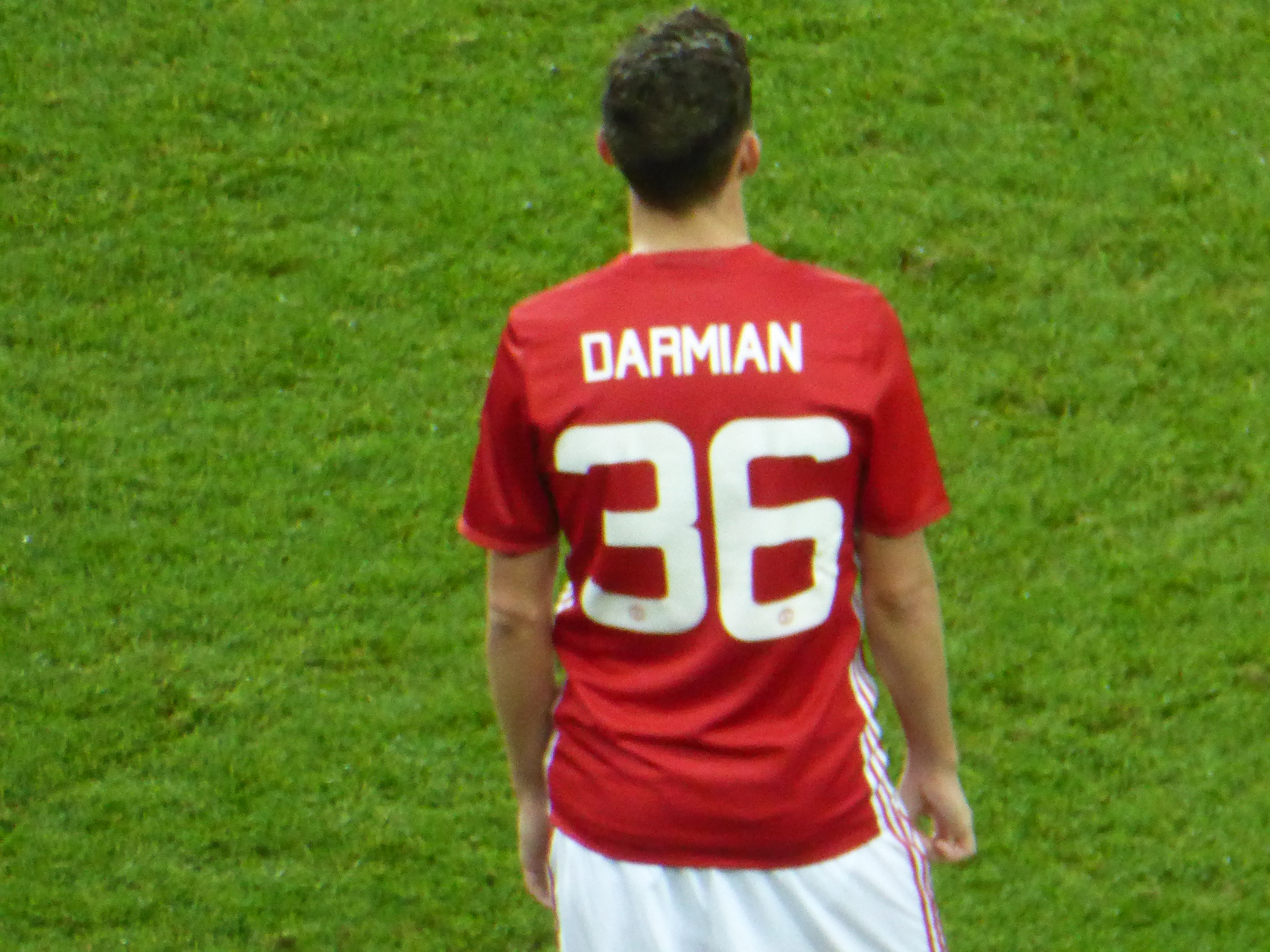
Darmian playing for Manchester United in 2017

==== 2016–17 season ====
Darmian's first appearance of the 2016–17 season came on 15 September 2016, in a 1–0 defeat against Dutch-side Feyenoord in the UEFA Europa League group stage. He didn't feature again until 20 October, when he played the full 90 minutes against Turkish-side Fenerbahçe in a 4–1 win. Darmian appeared in all of United's Premier League games in November, playing at left-back against Swansea City, Arsenal and West Ham United. He continued to contribute to United's unbeaten streak by featuring against Everton, Tottenham Hotspur, Crystal Palace and West Bromwich Albion in December. On 10 January 2017, he played in the 2–0 victory against Hull City in the EFL Cup semi-final first-leg, assisting the second goal with a cross to Marouane Fellaini. He also played in the second leg on 27 January, helping United advance 3–2 on aggregate.

Darmian's appearances in the league became limited after a 1–1 draw against rivals Liverpool on 15 January, with him not featuring again until 19 March when he came on as a stoppage time substitute in a 3–1 win against Middlesbrough. On 9 April, he started for United, his first in the league since January, in a 3–0 victory over Sunderland at the Stadium of Light. In May 2017, Darmian played in both of the UEFA Europa League semi-final games against Spanish-side Celta Vigo, helping United go through to the final 2–1 on aggregate. On 24 May, Darmian started at left-back in the UEFA Europa League Final against Dutch-side Ajax, playing the full 90 minutes as United won 2–0.

==== 2017–18 season ====
Darmian made his first appearance of the 2017–18 season on 8 August 2017 against Real Madrid in the UEFA Super Cup, which United lost 1–2. His first Premier League appearance of the season was on 9 September, in a 2–2 draw against Stoke City. He didn't feature again in the league until 14 October in a 0–0 draw against Liverpool at Anfield. While not featuring in the league, Darmian did play in the UEFA Champions League in a 2–0 win over Benfica on 31 October and in a 1–0 defeat against Basel on 22 November. On 20 December, he played in United's 2–1 defeat to Bristol City in the EFL Cup fifth round. Darmian made his first league start since October on 18 April 2018, playing against AFC Bournemouth in a 2–0 victory. Three days later, he came off the bench in the 80th minute to see out United's 2–1 victory over Tottenham Hotspur in the FA Cup semi-final at Wembley Stadium. Darmian started in United's last league game of the season on 13 May, overseeing a 1–0 win over Watford at Old Trafford. He was left on the bench for Manchester United's 1–0 defeat to Chelsea in the FA Cup Final on 19 May. After falling out of favour with José Mourinho, Darmian only managed eight league appearances the whole season, five of which were starts.

==== 2018–19 season ====
Despite speculation that Darmian would depart Manchester United in the summer for more playing time, he ended up staying for the 2018–19 season. He started United's first game of the season on 11 August at right-back in a 2–1 victory over Leicester City. Darmian's chances were limited until 24 November, when he started against Crystal Palace in a 0–0 draw. On 5 December, he started at left-back in a 2–2 draw against Arsenal. He played at right-back in United's 3–1 defeat to Liverpool on 16 December. On 5 January 2019, Darmian played at centre-back in Manchester United's 2–0 FA Cup third round win over Reading. Caretaker manager Ole Gunnar Solskjær praised Darmian's performance by saying, "He was one of the few who settled us down and tried to pass it and I don’t think he put a foot wrong.”

=== Parma ===
On 2 September 2019, Darmian returned to Italy signing for Parma on a four-year deal. Darmian enjoyed a largely injury-free season and cemented himself as Parma's first choice right back, in a year that saw them finish 11th in Serie A. He made 36 league appearances in total at Parma, scoring one goal and providing one assist. Darmian scored the opening goal for Parma in a 2-1 Serie A away victory at Brescia on 25th July, 2020 with Kulusevski providing the assist.

=== Inter Milan ===
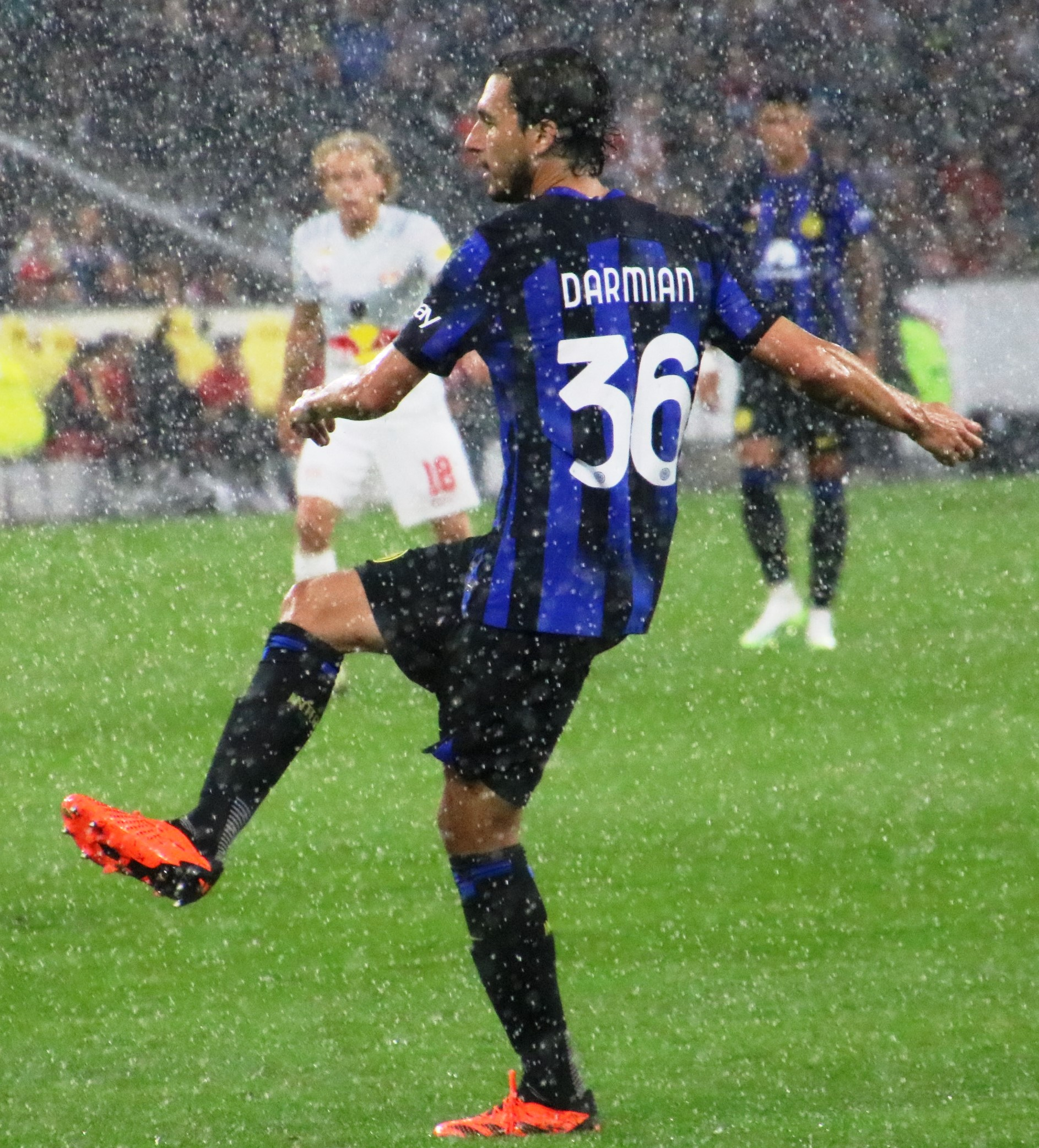
Darmian in action with Inter during the 2023-24 pre-season friendlies against Red Bull Salzburg

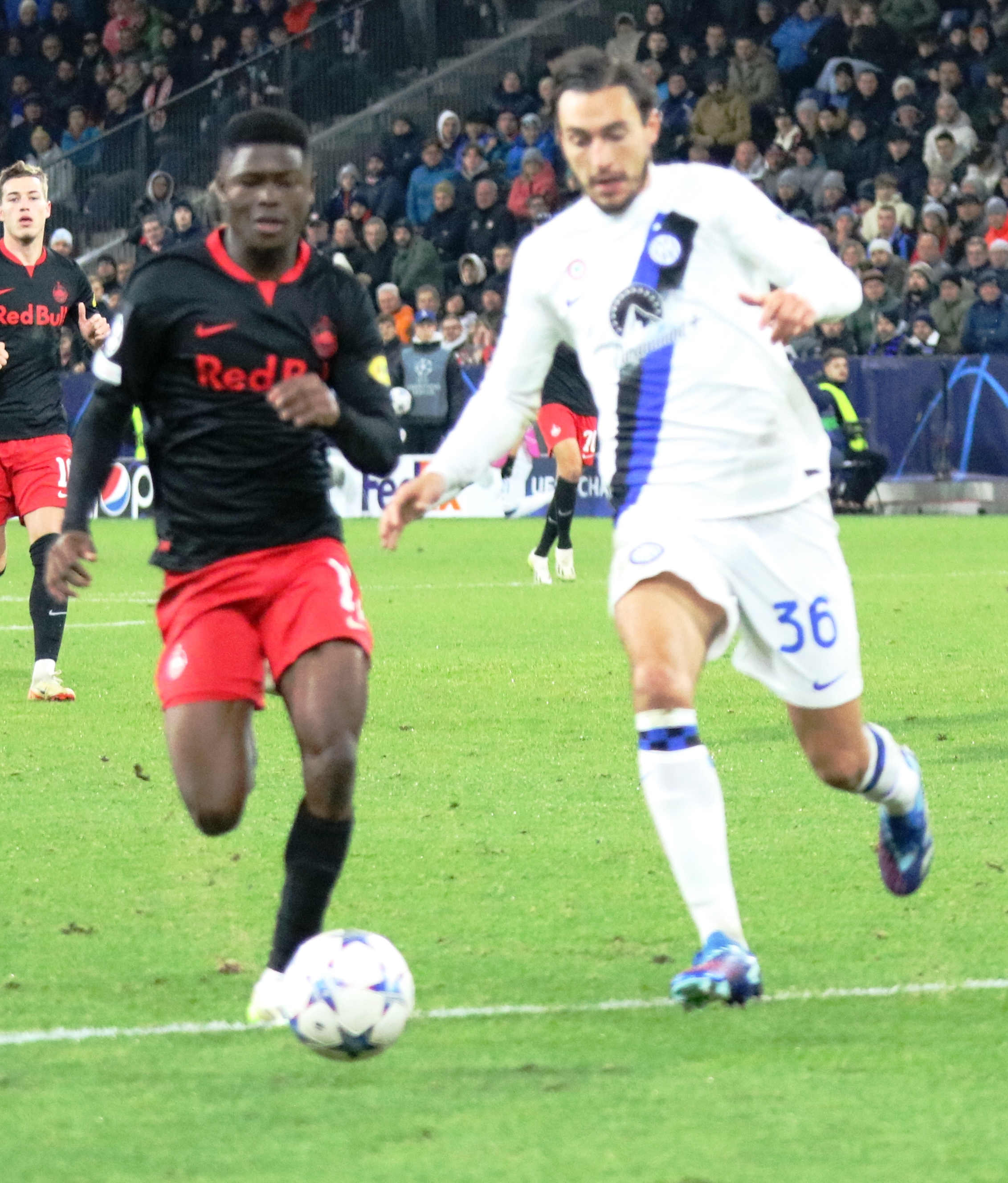
Darmian playing for Internazionale in UEFA Champions League group stage in 2023

On 5 October 2020, Darmian joined Inter Milan on a season-long loan; Inter had an obligation to make the transfer permanent for £1.8 million at the end of the loan period, which they ended up activating.

On 30 December 2023, Darmian extended his contract with Inter Milan until 30 June 2025. He left the club at the conclusion of the 2025–26 season, having achieved the domestic double.

=== Bologna ===
On 8 October 2026, Darmian joined Bologna as a free agent, signing a contract until the end of the season.

== International career ==
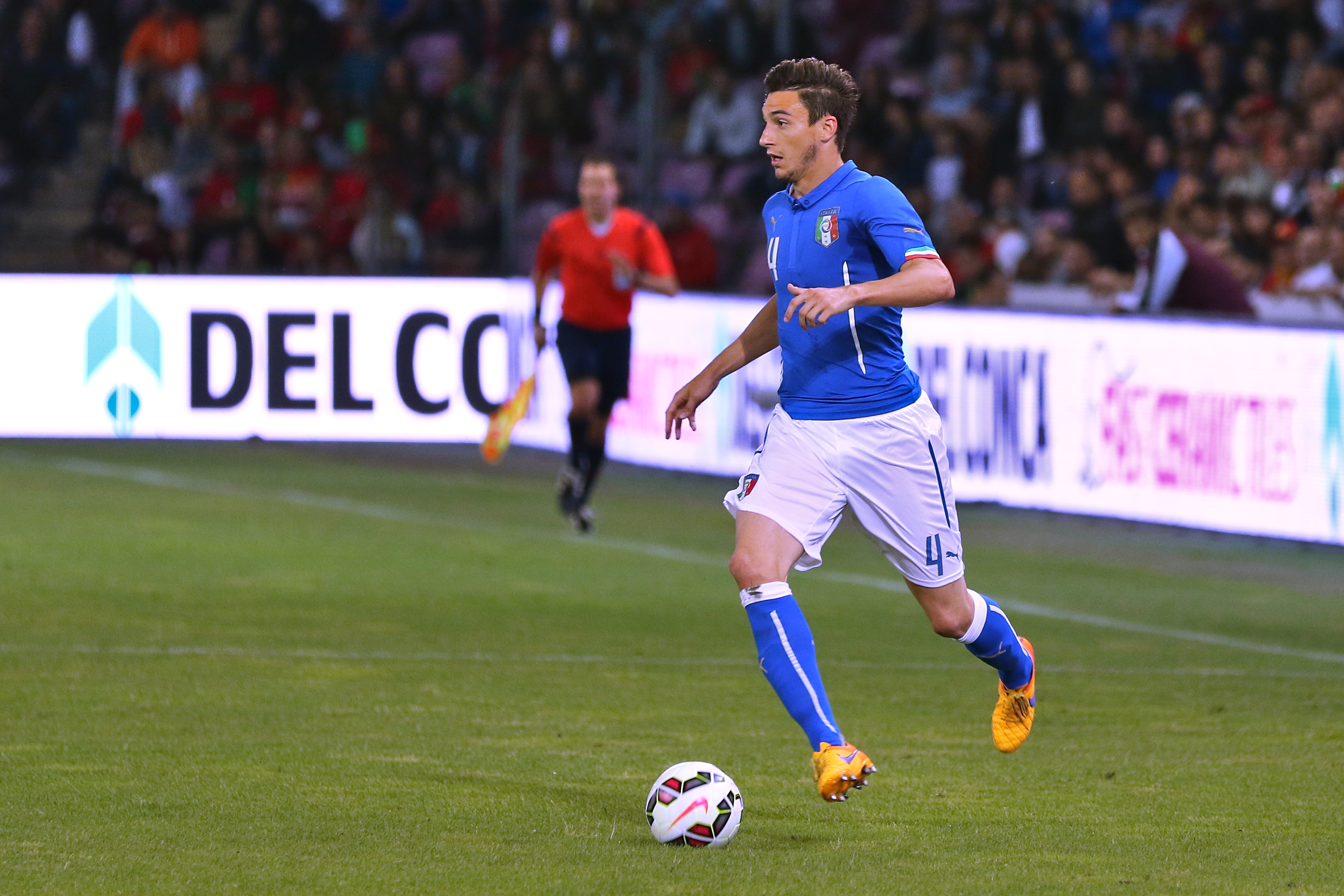
Darmian in action in a June 2015 friendly match in Geneva, Switzerland

After playing for Italy at under-17 and under-18 levels, he made his debut for the under-19 squad, led by Francesco Rocca, in June 2007. At the 2008 UEFA European U-19 Championship he played in the starting line-up, always in the role of a right-back. In 2009, he took part in the Mediterranean Games, playing seven games for the under-20 side. On 25 March 2009, he made his debut for the Italy under-21 side in a 2–2 friendly match draw against Austria, which was played in Vienna. From 10 to 12 March 2014, he was called up to the senior national team by coach Cesare Prandelli as part of an internship to evaluate young players ahead of the 2014 FIFA World Cup, and was also part of the next meeting between 14 and 15 April 2014.

Given his excellent season with Torino, on 13 May 2014, he was included in the list of 30 provisional players for the 2014 World Cup. He made his debut for the Azzurri on 31 May 2014, at the age of 24, playing as a right-back in a goalless friendly match with Ireland which was held in London. The following day, he was included in the list of 23 players selected for the 2014 World Cup. On 14 June 2014, he made his debut at the World Cup, starting Italy's opening game against England, which Italy won 2–1. He also played the next two games against Costa Rica and Uruguay, both of which were 1–0 defeats for Italy who failed to qualify for the next round.

In early 2015, he was awarded with the Pallone Azzurro as the best player of the national team for 2014. On 10 October of that year, he scored his first international goal, which was the final one of a 3–1 away win over Azerbaijan which sealed Italy's qualification to UEFA Euro 2016. On 31 May 2016, he was named in Antonio Conte's 23-man Italy squad for Euro 2016. In the round of 16 of the tournament, at Stade de France in Paris on 27 June 2016, he came off the bench and set-up Graziano Pellè's 91st minute volley to give the Azzurri a 2–0 win over defending champions Spain. On 2 July 2016, he missed Italy's final penalty in a 6–5 shoot-out defeat to reigning World Cup champions Germany in the quarter-finals of the competition. After a long period of absence, in 2023 he returned regularly in the convocations of Italy, scoring against North Macedonia in November 2023.

== Style of play ==
Although he started his career as a centre-back, and has occasionally continued to be used in this role, and even played as a central or defensive midfielder for the Milan youth team, in recent years Darmian has predominantly played as a defensive-minded full-back or wing-back, or even as a winger on occasion; due to his ability with either foot, he is capable of playing on either flank, although he prefers to be deployed on the right side of the pitch. An intelligent, dynamic, hard-working, and versatile player, he is known for his good quality of offensive and defensive play, as well as his tactical awareness, pace, and stamina, attributes which allow him to cover the wing effectively and provide width to his team when attacking. His professionalism, as well as his promising and consistent performances in his youth, led him to be compared to several esteemed Italian former full-backs, such as Antonio Cabrini and Paolo Maldini. During the 2012–13 season, Darmian made the most tackles per game (5.3) across Europe's top five leagues.

== Career statistics ==
=== Club ===
As of match played 17 October 2026

Appearances and goals by club, season and competition
Club	Season	League			National cup (Note: Includes Coppa Italia, FA Cup)		League cup (Note: Includes Football League/EFL Cup)		Europe		Other		Total	
Club	Season	Division	Apps	Goals	Apps	Goals	Apps	Goals	Apps	Goals	Apps	Goals	Apps	Goals
AC Milan	2006–07	Serie A	1	0	1	0	—		0	0	—		2	0
AC Milan	2007–08	Serie A	0	0	1	0	—		1 (Note: Appearance(s) in UEFA Champions League)	0	0	0	2	0
AC Milan	2008–09	Serie A	3	0	0	0	—		0	0	—		3	0
AC Milan	Total		4	0	2	0	—		1	0	0	0	7	0
Padova (loan)	2009–10	Serie B	20	1	0	0	—		—		2 (Note: Appearance(s) in Serie B relegation play-offs)	0	22	1
Palermo	2010–11	Serie A	11	0	1	0	—		4 (Note: Appearance(s) in UEFA Europa League)	0	—		16	0
Torino	2011–12	Serie B	33	1	1	0	—		—		—		34	1
Torino	2012–13	Serie A	30	0	2	0	—		—		—		32	0
Torino	2013–14	Serie A	37	0	1	0	—		—		—		38	0
Torino	2014–15	Serie A	33	2	1	0	—		13	3	—		47	5
Torino	Total		133	3	5	0	—		13	3	—		151	6
Manchester United	2015–16	Premier League	28	1	3	0	1	0	7 (Note: Six appearances in UEFA Champions League, one appearance in UEFA Europa League)	0	—		39	1
Manchester United	2016–17	Premier League	18	0	2	0	2	0	7	0	0	0	29	0
Manchester United	2017–18	Premier League	8	0	2	0	3	0	3	0	1 (Note: Appearance in UEFA Super Cup)	0	17	0
Manchester United	2018–19	Premier League	6	0	1	0	0	0	0	0	—		7	0
Manchester United	Total		60	1	8	0	6	0	17	0	1	0	92	1
Parma	2019–20	Serie A	33	1	1	0	—		—		—		34	1
Parma	2020–21	Serie A	3	0	0	0	—		—		—		3	0
Parma	Total		36	1	1	0	—		—		—		37	1
Inter Milan (loan)	2020–21	Serie A	26	3	3	0	—		4	1	—		33	4
Inter Milan	2021–22	Serie A	25	2	5	0	—		5	0	1 (Note: Appearance(s) in Supercoppa Italiana)	0	36	2
Inter Milan	2022–23	Serie A	31	1	5	1	—		11	0	1	0	48	2
Inter Milan	2023–24	Serie A	33	2	1	0	—		7	0	2	0	43	2
Inter Milan	2024–25	Serie A	29	3	4	0	—		10	0	6 (Note: Two appearances in Supercoppa Italiana, four appearances in FIFA Club World Cup)	0	49	3
Inter Milan	2025–26	Serie A	6	0	1	0	—		2	0	0	0	9	0
Inter Milan	Inter total		150	11	19	1	—		39	1	10	0	218	13
Bologna	2026–27	Serie A	2	0	0	0	—		—		—		2	0
Career total			417	17	36	1	6	0	74	4	13	0	545	22

=== International ===
Appearances and goals by national team and year
National team	Year	Apps	Goals
Italy	2014	9	0
Italy	2015	10	1
Italy	2016	8	0
Italy	2017	9	0
Italy	2018	0	0
Italy	2019	0	0
Italy	2020	0	0
Italy	2021	0	0
Italy	2022	0	0
Italy	2023	5	1
Italy	2024	5	0
Total		46	2

Italy score listed first, score column indicates score after each Darmian goal.

International goals by date, venue, opponent, score, result and competition
No.	Date	Venue	Opponent	Score	Result	Competition
1	10 October 2015	Baku National Stadium, Baku, Azerbaijan	Azerbaijan	3–1	3–1	UEFA Euro 2016 qualifying
2	17 November 2023	Stadio Olimpico, Rome, Italy	North Macedonia	1–0	5–2	UEFA Euro 2024 qualifying

== Honours ==
Manchester United

- FA Cup: 2015–16; runner-up: 2017–18
- UEFA Europa League: 2016–17

Inter Milan

- Serie A: 2020–21, 2023–24, 2025–26
- Coppa Italia: 2021–22, 2022–23, 2025–26
- Supercoppa Italiana: 2021, 2022, 2023
- UEFA Champions League runner-up: 2022–23, 2024–25

Italy U20

- Mediterranean Games runner-up: 2009

Individual

- Serie A Team of the Year: 2013–14, 2014–15
- Pallone Azzurro: 2014

Records

- Guinness World Record for the most goals scored from a corner in one minute: six goals (shared with Antonio Valencia)
