= Yann Aurel Bisseck =

German footballer (born 2000)

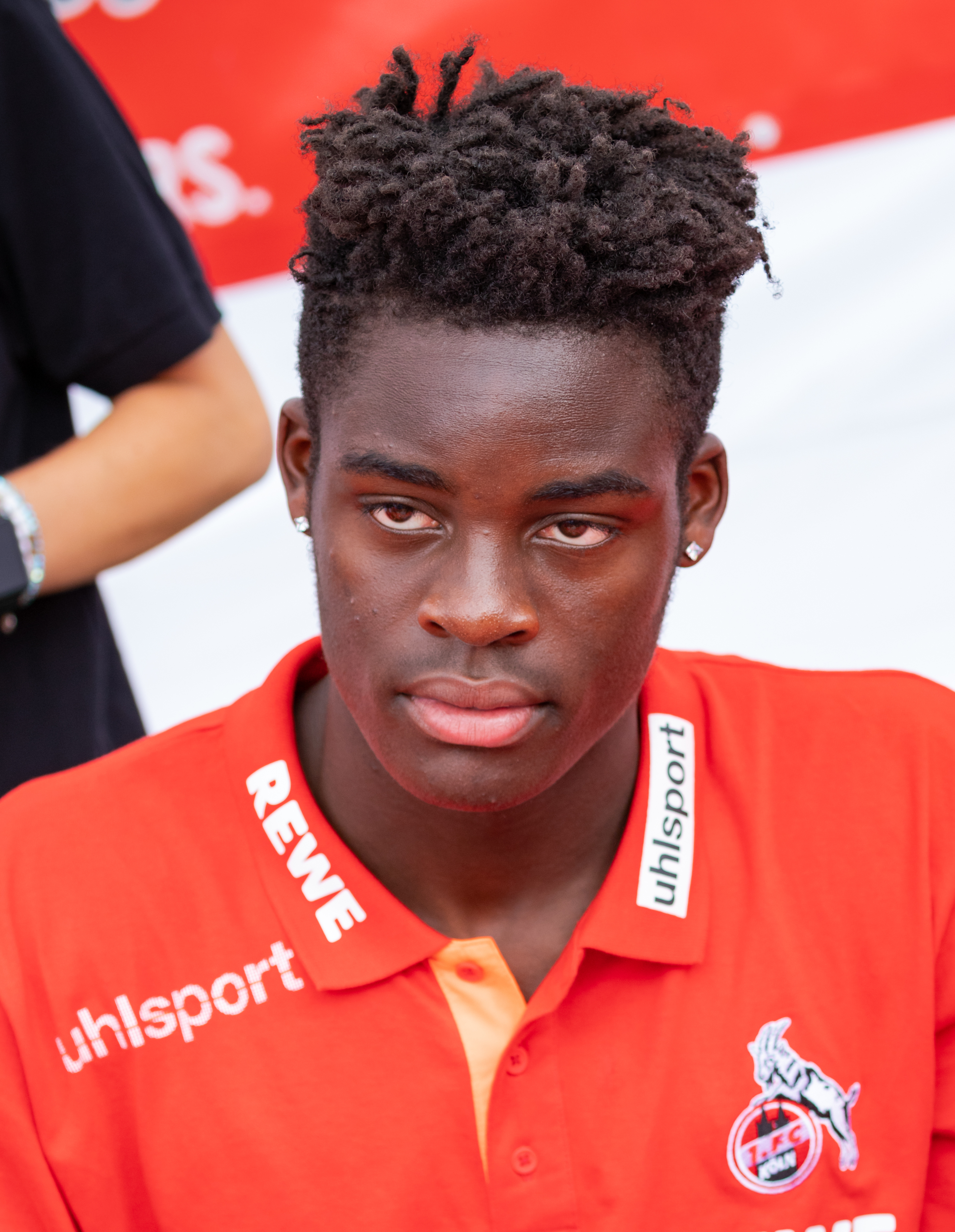
- Bisseck with 1. FC Köln in 2018

Personal information
- Full name: Yann Aurel Ludger Bisseck
- Date of birth: 29 November 2000 (age 25)
- Place of birth: Cologne, Germany
- Height: 1.96 m (6 ft 5 in)
- Position: Centre-back

Team information
- Current team: Inter Milan
- Number: 31

Youth career
- 2004–2007: SV Adler Dellbrück
- 2007–2018: 1. FC Köln

Senior career*
Years	Team	Apps	(Gls)
2017–2021	1. FC Köln	3	(0)
2018	1. FC Köln II	15	(2)
2019	→ Holstein Kiel (loan)	3	(0)
2019	→ Holstein Kiel II (loan)	5	(0)
2019–2020	→ Roda JC (loan)	10	(1)
2020–2021	→ Vitória Guimarães B (loan)	9	(1)
2021–2022	→ AGF (loan)	30	(1)
2022–2023	AGF	32	(4)
2023–	Inter Milan	75	(9)

International career^{‡}
2016–2017	Germany U17	4	(1)
2018	Germany U18	3	(0)
2018–2019	Germany U19	7	(1)
2022–2023	Germany U21	8	(1)
2025–	Germany	2	(0)
- * Club domestic league appearances and goals as of 22:31, 31 October 2026 (UTC) ‡ National team caps and goals as of 20:40, 27 September 2026 (UTC)

Yann Aurel Ludger Bisseck (born 29 November 2000) is a German professional footballer who plays as a centre-back for Serie A club Inter Milan and the Germany national team.

== Club career ==
=== Early career ===
Bisseck made his debut for 1. FC Köln against Hertha BSC on 26 November 2017 at the age of 16, making him the youngest player in Köln's history and the youngest-ever German player to appear in the Bundesliga. Bisseck's appearance also made him the second youngest player in league history, behind Nuri Şahin.

On 17 January 2019, Bisseck was loaned out to Holstein Kiel until the end of 2019–20 season. His loan was cut short and he joined Eerste Divisie club Roda on a one-year loan. After briefly returning to his hometown club in summer 2020, Köln announced that Bisseck joined Portuguese club Vitória de Guimarães on a two-year loan. However, it ended after one year, and he was sent to Danish Superliga club AGF on another one-year loan. On 27 October 2021, AGF confirmed that the club had triggered his buying option and signed him permanently until June 2026. According to the club, it took immediate effect from the same date.

=== Inter Milan ===
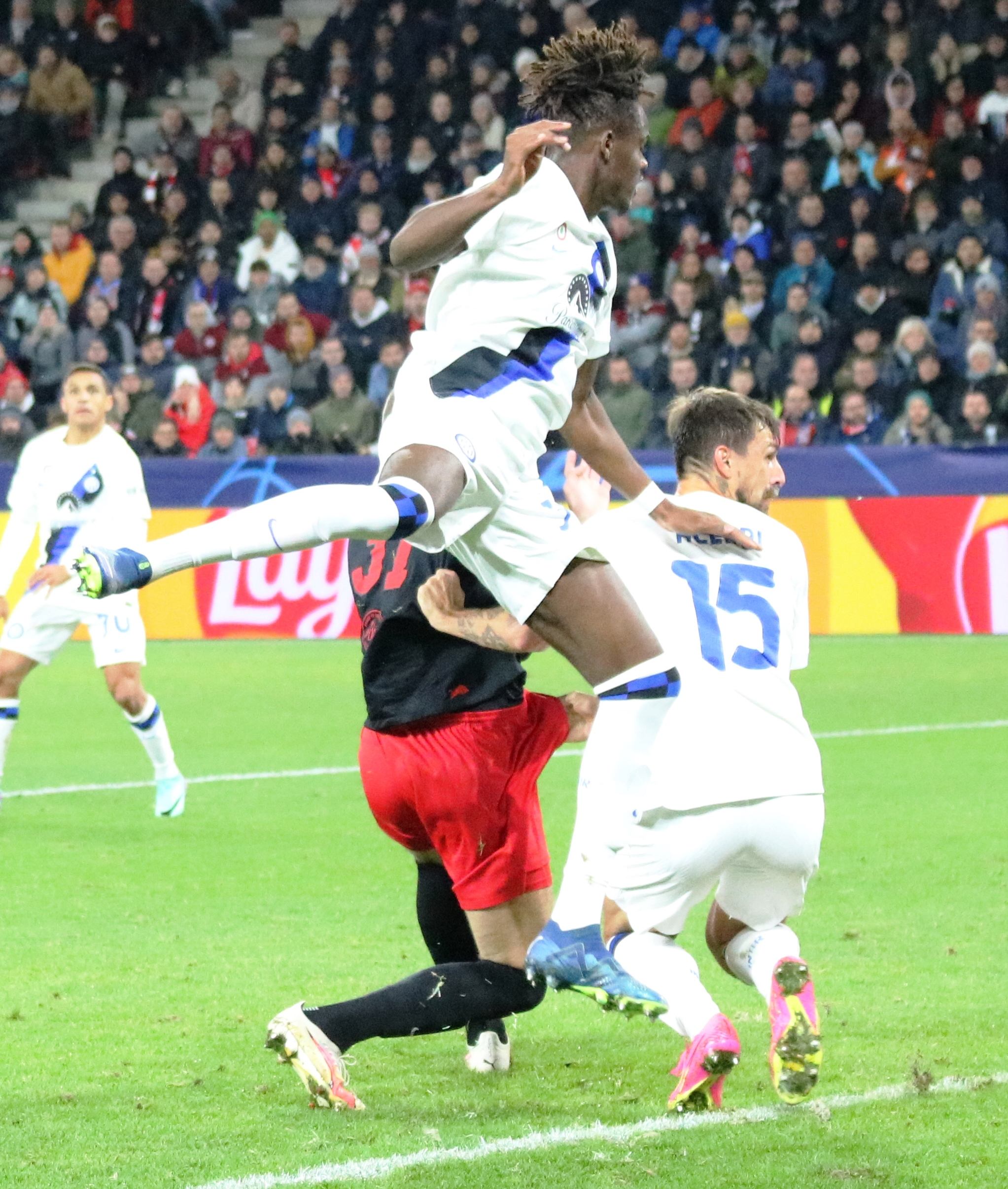
Bisseck playing for Inter Milan in a UEFA Champions League match in 2023

On 12 July 2023, Bisseck joined Serie A club Inter Milan on a permanent deal until 2028, for around €7 million with bonuses. On 20 August, he made his league debut for Inter in a 2–0 victory against Monza in their opening match of the 2023–24 season. Bisseck started for the first time in a 1–0 UEFA Champions League victory against RB Salzburg on 8 November. One month later, on 23 December, he scored his first goal for Inter in a 2–0 victory against Lecce at San Siro.

== International career ==
Bisseck is a former youth international for Germany. In March 2025, he received his first call-up to the senior national team by Julian Nagelsmann for the upcoming UEFA Nations League matches against Italy. On 23 March, he made his national team debut in said match, coming on as a substitute in a 3–3 draw.

== Personal life ==
Bisseck was born in Germany and is of Cameroonian descent.

== Career statistics ==
=== Club ===
As of match played 3 November 2026

Appearances and goals by club, season and competition
Club	Season	League			National cup (Note: Includes Danish Cup, Coppa Italia)		Europe		Other		Total	
Club	Season	Division	Apps	Goals	Apps	Goals	Apps	Goals	Apps	Goals	Apps	Goals
1. FC Köln	2017–18	Bundesliga	3	0	0	0	—		—		3	0
1. FC Köln II	2017–18	Regionalliga West	1	0	—		—		—		1	0
1. FC Köln II	2018–19	Regionalliga West	14	2	—		—		—		14	2
1. FC Köln II	Total		15	2	—		—		—		15	2
Holstein Kiel (loan)	2018–19	2. Bundesliga	3	0	0	0	—		—		3	0
Holstein Kiel II (loan)	2018–19	Regionalliga Nord	4	0	—		—		—		4	0
Holstein Kiel II (loan)	2019–20	Regionalliga Nord	1	0	—		—		—		1	0
Holstein Kiel II (loan)	Total		5	0	—		—		—		5	0
Roda (loan)	2019–20	Eerste Divisie	10	1	0	0	—		—		10	1
Vitória Guimarães B (loan)	2020–21	Campeonato do Portugal	9	1	—		—		—		9	1
AGF (loan)	2021–22	Danish Superliga	30	1	1	0	2 (Note: Appearances in UEFA Europa Conference League)	0	—		33	1
AGF	2022–23	Danish Superliga	32	4	3	1	—		—		35	5
AGF	AGF total		62	5	4	1	2	0	—		68	6
Inter Milan	2023–24	Serie A	16	2	1	0	3 (Note: Appearances in UEFA Champions League)	0	1 (Note: Appearance(s) in Supercoppa Italiana)	0	21	2
Inter Milan	2024–25	Serie A	27	3	4	0	13	0	2	0	46	3
Inter Milan	2025–26	Serie A	23	3	5	0	7	0	1	0	36	3
Inter Milan	2026–27	Serie A	9	1	0	0	4	1	0	0	13	2
Inter Milan	Total		75	9	10	0	27	1	4	0	116	10
Career total			182	18	14	1	29	1	4	0	229	20

=== International ===
As of match played 27 September 2026

Appearances and goals by national team and year
National team	Year	Apps	Goals
Germany	2025	1	0
Germany	2026	1	0
Total		2	0

== Honours ==
Inter Milan

- Serie A: 2023–24, 2025–26
- Coppa Italia: 2025–26
- Supercoppa Italiana: 2023
- UEFA Champions League runner-up: 2024–25

Individual

- Fritz Walter Medal U19 Bronze: 2019
