= Lorenzo Moretti =

Italian footballer (born 2002)

Personal information
- Date of birth: 26 February 2002 (age 24)
- Place of birth: Magenta, Italy
- Height: 1.87 m (6 ft 2 in)
- Position: Defender

Team information
- Current team: Novara
- Number: 42

Youth career
- –2021: Inter Milan
- 2017–2018: → Novara (loan)

Senior career*
Years	Team	Apps	(Gls)
2021–2022	Inter Milan	0	(0)
2021–2022	→ Pistoiese (loan)	31	(1)
2022–2023	Avellino	32	(0)
2023–2024	Triestina	32	(2)
2024–2026	Cremonese	5	(0)
2025–2026	→ Virtus Entella (loan)	8	(0)
2026	→ Union Brescia (loan)	3	(0)
2026–	Novara	1	(0)

International career^{‡}
2018–2019	Italy U17	12	(1)
2019	Italy U18	4	(1)
- * Club domestic league appearances and goals as of 22 August 2026 ‡ National team caps and goals as of 9 September 2019

Lorenzo Moretti (born 26 February 2002) is an Italian professional footballer who plays as a defender for Serie C Group A club Novara.

== Club career ==
On 18 August 2021, Moretti was loaned to Serie C club Pistoiese.

On 15 July 2022, Moretti signed a three-year contract with Avellino.

On 18 August 2023, Moretti joined Triestina on a two-year contract.

On 26 July 2024, Moretti signed with Serie B club Cremonese. On 25 August 2025, Moretti was loaned by Virtus Entella, with an option to buy.

== Personal life ==
He is the twin brother of fellow footballer Andrea.

== Career statistics ==
=== Club ===
As of 18 May 2024

Club	Season	League			Cup		Europe		Other		Total	
Club	Season	League	Apps	Goals	Apps	Goals	Apps	Goals	Apps	Goals	Apps	Goals
Pistoiese (loan)	2021–22	Serie C	31	1	1	0	—		2 (Note: All appearance(s) in Serie C play-out.)	0	34	1
Avellino	2022–23	Serie C	32	0	3	0	—		—		35	0
Triestina	2023–24	Serie C	32	2	3	0	—		2 (Note: All appearance(s) in Serie C play-offs.)	0	37	2
Career total			95	3	7	0	—		4	0	106	3
