= Alessandro Silvestro =

Italian footballer (born 2002)

Personal information
- Date of birth: 27 August 2002 (age 24)
- Place of birth: Rome, Italy
- Height: 1.88 m (6 ft 2 in)
- Position: Right-back

Team information
- Current team: Cerignola
- Number: 37

Youth career
- 2011–2015: Lazio
- 2015–2016: Nuova Tor Tre Teste
- 2016–2019: Romulea
- 2019–2022: Inter Milan
- 2019–2020: → Nocerina (loan)
- 2020: → Romulea (loan)

Senior career*
Years	Team	Apps	(Gls)
2020–2024	Inter Milan	0	(0)
2020–2021	→ Montespaccato (loan)	28	(1)
2022–2023	→ Pro Vercelli (loan)	6	(0)
2023	→ Montevarchi (loan)	13	(0)
2023–2024	→ Fiorenzuola (loan)	14	(0)
2024	→ Foggia (loan)	11	(2)
2024–2025	Foggia	24	(2)
2025–2026	Triestina	15	(0)
2026–	Cerignola	1	(0)
- * Club domestic league appearances and goals as of 28 August 2026

Alessandro Silvestro (born 27 August 2002) is an Italian professional footballer who plays as a right-back for Serie C Group C club Cerignola.

== Club career ==
In the summer of 2020, Silvestro started his senior career with Serie D club Montespaccato on a season-long loan from Inter Milan. The following season Silvestro was assigned to Inter Milan's under-19 squad, where he went on to win the Campionato Primavera 1.

On 25 July 2022, Silvestro joined Serie C club Pro Vercelli on a season-long loan. On 11 January 2023, Silvestro was recalled and subsequently loaned out to Montevarchi until the end of the campaign.

For the 2023–24 campaign, Silvestro was initially loaned to Fiorenzuola, before getting recalled and finishing the season at Foggia.

After the positive loan spell at Foggia, on 19 July 2024, Silvestro returned to the Satanelli, this time on a permanent basis, signing a two-year contract.

== Career statistics ==
=== Club ===
As of 27 April 2024.

Appearances and goals by club, season and competition
Club	Season	League			Cup		Other		Total	
Club	Season	Division	Apps	Goals	Apps	Goals	Apps	Goals	Apps	Goals
Montespaccato (loan)	2020–21	Serie D	28	1	0	0	—		28	1
Pro Vercelli (loan)	2022–23	Serie C	6	0	0	0	—		6	0
Montevarchi (loan)	2022–23	Serie C	13	0	0	0	—		13	0
Fiorenzuola (loan)	2023–24	Serie C	14	0	1	0	—		15	0
Foggia (loan)	2023–24	Serie C	11	2	0	0	—		11	2
Career total			72	3	1	0	0	0	73	3

== Honours ==
Inter Primavera

- Campionato Primavera 1: 2021–22
