= Serie A Football Club of the Year =

Serie A annual award

- Sport: Association football
- Competition: Serie A
- Awarded for: The football club considered to have performed the best in each given Serie A season
- Local name: Società dell'anno AIC (Italian)
- Country: Italy
- Presented by: Italian Footballers' Association (AIC)

History
- First award: 2010–11
- Editions: 16
- Most wins: Juventus (7 times)
- Most recent: Internazionale (2026)
- Website: Official website

The AIC Serie A Football Club of the Year (in Italian: Società dell'anno AIC) is an annual award given to football club in the top tier of Italian football, the Serie A, who is considered to have performed the best during the previous calendar season. It is awarded within the Gran Galà del Calcio event.

The award has been presented since the 2010–11 season. The shortlist is compiled by the members of the players' trade union, the Italian Footballers' Association (AIC).

== Winners ==
Key
§	Denotes the club were Serie A champions in the same season

Year	Nat.	President	Club	Ref(s)
2011	(Italy)	Franco Soldati	Udinese	
2012	(Italy)	Andrea Agnelli	Juventus^{§}	
2013	(Italy)	Andrea Agnelli	Juventus^{§}	
2014	(Italy)	Andrea Agnelli	Juventus^{§}	
2015	(Italy)	Andrea Agnelli	Juventus^{§}	
2016	(Italy)	Andrea Agnelli	Juventus^{§}	
2017	(Italy)	Andrea Agnelli	Juventus^{§}	
2018	(Italy)	Andrea Agnelli	Juventus^{§}	
2019	(Italy)	Antonio Percassi	Atalanta	
2020	(Italy)	Antonio Percassi	Atalanta	
2021	(China)	Steven Zhang	Internazionale^{§}	
2022	(Italy)	Paolo Scaroni	Milan^{§}	
2023	(Italy)	Aurelio De Laurentiis	Napoli^{§}	
2024	(Italy)	Giuseppe Marotta	Internazionale^{§}	
2025	(Italy)	Aurelio De Laurentiis	Napoli^{§}	
2026	(Italy)	Giuseppe Marotta	Internazionale^{§}	

=== By club ===
Club	Times won
Juventus	7
Internazionale	3
Atalanta	2
Napoli	2
Milan	1
Udinese	1
