= William Rovida =

Italian footballer

Personal information
- Date of birth: 14 March 2003 (age 23)
- Place of birth: Milan, Italy
- Height: 1.95 m (6 ft 5 in)
- Position: Goalkeeper

Team information
- Current team: Pro Patria
- Number: 1

Youth career
- –2022: Inter Milan

Senior career*
Years	Team	Apps	(Gls)
2022–2024	Inter Milan	0	(0)
2022–2023	→ Carrarese (loan)	1	(0)
2023–2024	→ Pro Patria (loan)	31	(0)
2024–	Pro Patria	63	(0)

International career^{‡}
2021	Italy U18	1	(0)
- * Club domestic league appearances and goals as of 30 April 2026 ‡ National team caps and goals as of 18 august 2025

William Rovida (born 14 March 2003) is an Italian professional footballer who plays as a goalkeeper for Serie D club Pro Patria.

== Club career ==
After starting his career in Inter Milan's youth academy, on 13 July 2022, Rovida joined Serie C club Carrarese on a season-long loan. At Carrarese, Rovida made two appearances, one in the league, and one in Coppa Italia Serie C.

On 20 July 2023, Rovida was loaned out for a season to Pro Patria. After being the first-choice goalkeeper for the 2023–24 season, on 3 July 2024, Pro Patria activated the option to make Rovida's transfer from Inter permanent, penning a three-year contract.

== International career ==
Rovida represented Italy as a youth international, with one cap with the under-18 squad.

== Career statistics ==
=== Club ===
As of 28 April 2024.

Appearances and goals by club, season and competition
Club	Season	League			Cup		Other		Total	
Club	Season	Division	Apps	Goals	Apps	Goals	Apps	Goals	Apps	Goals
Carrarese (loan)	2022–23	Serie C	1	0	1	0	0	0	2	0
Pro Patria (loan)	2023–24	Serie C	31	0	0	0	—		31	0
Career total			32	0	1	0	0	0	33	0
