= Andrea Moretti (footballer) =

Italian footballer (born 2002)

Personal information
- Date of birth: 26 February 2002 (age 24)
- Place of birth: Magenta, Italy
- Position: Defender

Team information
- Current team: Pro Vercelli
- Number: 30

Youth career
- –2022: Inter Milan
- 2018–2019: → Novara (loan)

Senior career*
Years	Team	Apps	(Gls)
2022–2024	Inter Milan	0	(0)
2022–2023	→ Pro Sesto (loan)	18	(0)
2023–2024	→ Pro Patria (loan)	38	(4)
2024–2026	Triestina	36	(1)
2025	→ Pontedera (loan)	14	(2)
2026	→ Cosenza (loan)	14	(1)
2026–	Pro Vercelli	0	(0)
- * Club domestic league appearances and goals as of 1 May 2026

Andrea Moretti (born 26 February 2002) is an Italian professional footballer who plays as a defender for Serie C Group A club Pro Vercelli.

== Club career ==
After starting his career in Inter Milan's youth academy, on 19 July 2022, Moretti was loaned to Serie C club Pro Sesto.

On 20 July 2023, Moretti joined Pro Patria on a season-long loan.

On 26 July 2024, Moretti moved to Triestina, signing a three-year contract.

== Personal life ==
He is the twin brother of fellow footballer Lorenzo.

== Career statistics ==
=== Club ===
As of 28 April 2024

Club	Season	League			Cup		Europe		Other		Total	
Club	Season	League	Apps	Goals	Apps	Goals	Apps	Goals	Apps	Goals	Apps	Goals
Pro Sesto (loan)	2022–23	Serie C	18	0	1	0	—		1 (Note: All appearance(s) in Serie C play-offs.)	0	20	0
Pro Patria (loan)	2023–24	Serie C	38	4	2	0	—		—		40	4
Career total			56	4	3	0	—		1	0	60	4
