= 2022–23 Inter Milan season =

Inter Milan
2022–23 season
- Chairman: Steven Zhang
- Head coach: Simone Inzaghi
- Stadium: San Siro
- Serie A: 3rd
- Coppa Italia: Winners
- Supercoppa Italiana: Winners
- UEFA Champions League: Runners-up
- Top goalscorer: League: Lautaro Martínez (21); All: Lautaro Martínez (28)
- Highest home attendance: 75,584 v Milan; 5 February 2023 (Serie A)
- Lowest home attendance: 40,032 v Parma; 10 January 2023 (Coppa Italia)
- Average home league attendance: 72,630
- Biggest win: 6–0 v Hellas Verona; 3 May 2023 (Serie A)
- Biggest defeat: 1–3 v Lazio; 26 August 2022 (Serie A); 0–2 v Bayern Munich; 7 September 2022 (UEFA Champions League); 1–3 v Udinese; 18 September 2022 (Serie A); 0–2 v Bayern Munich; 1 November 2022 (UEFA Champions League); 0–2 v Juventus; 6 November 2022 (Serie A); 1–3 v Napoli; 21 May 2023 (Serie A)
| Home colours | Away colours | Third colours |

The 2022–23 season was the 115th season in the existence of Inter Milan, which have all been played in the top division of Italian football. In addition to the domestic league, Inter participated in this season's editions of the Coppa Italia, the Supercoppa Italiana and the UEFA Champions League; they won the former two competitions and reached the final of the latter for the first time since 2010, where they were narrowly defeated 1–0 by Manchester City.

== Kits ==
Supplier: Nike / Front sponsor: DigitalBits (until 29 April); Paramount+ (from 2 June) / Back sponsor: Lenovo / Sleeve sponsor: eBay (from 1 January)

Outfield players kits

| Home | Home alt. | Away | Away alt. | Third |

Goalkeeper kits

| Goalkeeper 1 | Goalkeeper 2 | Goalkeeper 3 | Goalkeeper 4 |

== Players ==
=== First-team squad ===
As of 30 June 2023

Note: Flags indicate national team as defined under FIFA eligibility rules. Players may hold more than one non-FIFA nationality.

| No. | Player | Nat. | Position(s) | Date of birth (age) | Signed in | Signed from |
Goalkeepers
| 1 | Samir Handanović (captain) | (Slovenia) | GK | 14 July 1984 (aged 38) | 2012 | (Italy) Udinese |
| 21 | Alex Cordaz | (Italy) | GK | 1 January 1983 (aged 40) | 2021 | (Italy) Crotone |
| 24 | André Onana | (Cameroon) | GK | 2 April 1996 (aged 27) | 2022 | (Netherlands) Ajax |
Defenders
| 2 | Denzel Dumfries | (Netherlands) | RM / RWB | 18 April 1996 (aged 27) | 2021 | (Netherlands) PSV |
| 6 | Stefan de Vrij | (Netherlands) | CB | 5 February 1992 (aged 31) | 2018 | (Italy) Lazio |
| 8 | Robin Gosens | (Germany) | LWB / LM | 5 July 1994 (aged 28) | 2022 | (Italy) Atalanta |
| 12 | Raoul Bellanova | (Italy) | RM / RWB | 17 May 2000 (aged 23) | 2022 | (Italy) Cagliari (loan) |
| 15 | Francesco Acerbi | (Italy) | CB | 10 February 1988 (aged 35) | 2022 | (Italy) Lazio (loan) |
| 32 | Federico Dimarco | (Italy) | LWB / LM / CB | 10 November 1997 (aged 25) | 2018 | (Switzerland) Sion |
| 33 | Danilo D'Ambrosio (vice-captain) | (Italy) | CB / RB | 9 September 1988 (aged 34) | 2014 | (Italy) Torino |
| 36 | Matteo Darmian | (Italy) | CB / RWB / RM | 2 December 1989 (aged 33) | 2020 | (Italy) Parma |
| 37 | Milan Škriniar | (Slovakia) | CB | 11 February 1995 (aged 28) | 2017 | (Italy) Sampdoria |
| 46 | Mattia Zanotti | (Italy) | RWB / RM | 11 January 2003 (aged 20) | 2021 | (Italy) Youth Sector |
| 47 | Alessandro Fontanarosa | (Italy) | CB | 7 February 2003 (aged 20) | 2022 | (Italy) Youth Sector |
| 95 | Alessandro Bastoni | (Italy) | CB | 13 April 1999 (aged 24) | 2017 | (Italy) Atalanta |
Midfielders
| 5 | Roberto Gagliardini | (Italy) | CM | 7 April 1994 (aged 29) | 2017 | (Italy) Atalanta |
| 14 | Kristjan Asllani | (Albania) | DM / CM | 9 March 2002 (aged 21) | 2022 | (Italy) Empoli (loan) |
| 20 | Hakan Çalhanoğlu | (Turkey) | CM / DM | 8 February 1994 (aged 29) | 2021 | (Italy) Milan |
| 22 | Henrikh Mkhitaryan | (Armenia) | CM / AM | 21 January 1989 (aged 34) | 2022 | (Italy) Roma |
| 23 | Nicolò Barella | (Italy) | CM | 7 February 1997 (aged 26) | 2019 | (Italy) Cagliari |
| 45 | Valentín Carboni | (Argentina) | AM | 5 March 2005 (aged 18) | 2022 | (Italy) Youth Sector |
| 77 | Marcelo Brozović | (Croatia) | DM / CM | 16 November 1992 (aged 30) | 2015 | (Croatia) Dinamo Zagreb |
Forwards
| 9 | Edin Džeko | (Bosnia and Herzegovina) | ST | 17 March 1986 (aged 37) | 2021 | (Italy) Roma |
| 10 | Lautaro Martínez | (Argentina) | ST | 22 August 1997 (aged 25) | 2018 | (Argentina) Racing Club |
| 11 | Joaquín Correa | (Argentina) | SS | 13 August 1994 (aged 28) | 2021 | (Italy) Lazio |
| 90 | Romelu Lukaku | (Belgium) | ST | 13 May 1993 (aged 30) | 2022 | (England) Chelsea (loan) |

=== Youth academy players ===
Inter Primavera players that received a first-team squad call-up.

| No. | Player | Nat. | Position(s) | Date of birth (age) |
|---|---|---|---|---|
| 40 | Nikolaos Botis | (Greece) | GK | 31 March 2004 (aged 19) |
| 42 | Dennis Curatolo | (Italy) | ST | 3 April 2004 (aged 19) |
| 43 | Ebenezer Akinsanmiro | (Nigeria) | CM / AM | 25 November 2004 (aged 18) |
| 49 | Issiaka Kamate | (France) | CM | 2 August 2004 (aged 18) |
| 50 | Aleksandar Stanković | (Serbia) | DM / CB | 3 August 2005 (aged 17) |
| 51 | Tommaso Guercio | (Poland) | CB | 1 June 2005 (aged 18) |
| 52 | Stefano Di Pentima | (Italy) | CB | 21 September 2004 (aged 18) |
| 53 | Nicolò Biral | (Italy) | CM | 1 January 2004 (aged 19) |
| 54 | Nikola Iliev | (Bulgaria) | AM | 6 June 2004 (aged 19) |
| 56 | Andrea Pelamatti | (Russia) | LWB / LM | 9 October 2004 (aged 18) |
| 57 | Silas Andersen | (Denmark) | DM | 13 June 2004 (aged 19) |
| 58 | Jan Żuberek | (Poland) | ST | 13 March 2004 (aged 19) |

=== Other players under contract ===
As of 13 January 2023

| No. | Player | Nat. | Position(s) | Date of birth (age) |
|---|---|---|---|---|
| — | Dalbert | (Brazil) | LWB / LM | 8 September 1993 (aged 29) |
| — | Jacopo Gianelli | (Italy) | CM | 4 March 2001 (aged 22) |

== Transfers ==
=== In ===
==== Transfers ====
| Date | Pos. | Player | Age | Moving from | Fee | Notes | Source |
Summer
| 1 July 2022 | GK | (Cameroon) André Onana | 26 | (Netherlands) Ajax | Free | | |
| 1 July 2022 | DF | (Germany) Robin Gosens | 27 | (Italy) Atalanta | €15m | (Note: From loan to permanent transfer. Inter is also expected to pay €10m of additional bonuses, reaching a potential €25m transfer fee.) | |
| 1 July 2022 | MF | (Armenia) Henrikh Mkhitaryan | 33 | (Italy) Roma | Free | | |
| 1 July 2022 | FW | (Argentina) Joaquín Correa | 27 | (Italy) Lazio | €25m | (Note: From loan to permanent transfer. The total cost of the operation, including the initial €5m loan fee and the additional €1m of bonuses, amounts to €31m.) | |

==== On loan ====
| Date | Pos. | Player | Age | Loaned from | Fee | Notes | Source |
Summer
| 1 July 2022 | FW | (Belgium) Romelu Lukaku | 29 | (England) Chelsea | €8m | (Note: Loan officialised on 29 June 2022. Inter is also expected to pay €4m of additional bonuses, reaching a potential €12m loan fee.) | |
| 1 July 2022 | MF | (Albania) Kristjan Asllani | 20 | (Italy) Empoli | €4m | (Note: Loan officialised on 30 June 2022. Inter has an obligation to buy the player for €10m, reaching a total transfer fee of €14m.) | |
| 5 July 2022 | DF | (Italy) Raoul Bellanova | 22 | (Italy) Cagliari | €3m | (Note: Loan with option to buy for €7m, reaching a potential €10m transfer fee.) | |
| 1 September 2022 | DF | (Italy) Francesco Acerbi | 34 | (Italy) Lazio | N/A | (Note: Loan with option to buy.) | |

==== Loan returns ====
| Date | Pos. | Player | Age | Returning from | Notes | Source |
Summer
| 30 June 2022 | GK | (Italy) Fabrizio Bagheria | 21 | (Italy) Pro Sesto | | |
| 30 June 2022 | GK | (Serbia) Filip Stanković | 20 | (Netherlands) Volendam | | |
| 30 June 2022 | DF | (Italy) Niccolò Corrado | 22 | (Italy) Feralpisalò | | |
| 30 June 2022 | DF | (Brazil) Dalbert | 28 | (Italy) Cagliari | | |
| 30 June 2022 | DF | (Italy) Christian Dimarco | 19 | (Italy) Fiorenzuola | | |
| 30 June 2022 | DF | (Italy) Lorenzo Moretti | 20 | (Italy) Pistoiese | | |
| 30 June 2022 | DF | (Italy) Lorenzo Pirola | 20 | (Italy) Monza | | |
| 30 June 2022 | DF | (Italy) Edoardo Sottini | 19 | (Italy) Pistoiese | | |
| 30 June 2022 | DF | (Belgium) Zinho Vanheusden | 22 | (Italy) Genoa | | |
| 30 June 2022 | DF | (Italy) Davide Zugaro | 22 | (Italy) Virtus Verona | | |
| 30 June 2022 | MF | (France) Lucien Agoumé | 20 | (France) Brest | | |
| 30 June 2022 | MF | (Haiti) Christopher Attys | 21 | (Croatia) Šibenik | | |
| 30 June 2022 | MF | (Italy) Riccardo Boscolo Chio | 19 | (Italy) Imolese | | |
| 30 June 2022 | MF | (Italy) Jacopo Gianelli | 21 | (Italy) Pro Sesto | | |
| 30 June 2022 | MF | (Austria) Valentino Lazaro | 26 | (Portugal) Benfica | | |
| 30 June 2022 | MF | (Belgium) Tibo Persyn | 20 | (Belgium) Westerlo | | |
| 30 June 2022 | MF | (Italy) Marco Pompetti | 22 | (Italy) Pescara | | |
| 30 June 2022 | MF | (Italy) Stefano Sensi | 26 | (Italy) Sampdoria | | |
| 30 June 2022 | MF | (Italy) Niccolò Squizzato | 20 | (Italy) Juve Stabia | | |
| 30 June 2022 | MF | (Argentina) Franco Vezzoni | 20 | (Italy) Pro Patria | | |
| 30 June 2022 | FW | (Italy) Sebastiano Esposito | 19 | (Switzerland) Basel | | |
| 30 June 2022 | FW | (Italy) Matias Fonseca | 21 | (Italy) Pergolettese | | |
| 30 June 2022 | FW | (Italy) Samuele Mulattieri | 21 | (Italy) Crotone | | |
| 30 June 2022 | FW | (Italy) Gaetano Oristanio | 19 | (Netherlands) Volendam | | |
| 30 June 2022 | FW | (Italy) Andrea Pinamonti | 23 | (Italy) Empoli | | |
| 30 June 2022 | FW | (Italy) Eddie Salcedo | 20 | (Italy) Spezia | | |
| 30 June 2022 | FW | (Uruguay) Martín Satriano | 21 | (France) Brest | | |
| 24 July 2022 | GK | (Brazil) Gabriel Brazão | 21 | (Brazil) Cruzeiro | | |
Winter
| 31 December 2022 | FW | (Argentina) Facundo Colidio | 22 | (Argentina) Tigre | | |
| 10 January 2023 | MF | (Italy) Mattia Sangalli | 20 | (Italy) Lecco | | |
| 11 January 2023 | DF | (Italy) Alessandro Silvestro | 20 | (Italy) Pro Vercelli | | |
| 17 January 2023 | GK | (Italy) Fabrizio Bagheria | 21 | (Italy) Recanatese | | |
| 23 January 2023 | DF | (Argentina) Franco Carboni | 19 | (Italy) Cagliari | | |
| 24 January 2023 | GK | (Romania) Ionuț Radu | 25 | (Italy) Cremonese | | |
| 30 January 2023 | FW | (Italy) Eddie Salcedo | 21 | (Italy) Bari | | |
| 30 January 2023 | FW | (Italy) Sebastiano Esposito | 20 | (Belgium) Anderlecht | | |
| 30 January 2023 | FW | (Italy) Matias Fonseca | 21 | (Italy) Imolese | | |
| 30 January 2023 | DF | (Italy) Edoardo Sottini | 20 | (Italy) Triestina | | |
| 30 January 2023 | MF | (Italy) Lorenzo Peschetola | 19 | (Italy) Foggia | | |

=== Out ===
==== Transfers ====
| Date | Pos. | Player | Age | Moving to | Fee | Notes | Source |
Summer
| 1 July 2022 | GK | (Italy) Michele Di Gregorio | 24 | (Italy) Monza | €4m | (Note: From loan to permanent transfer.) | |
| 1 July 2022 | DF | (Guadeloupe) Andreaw Gravillon | 24 | (France) Reims | €3.5m | | |
| 1 July 2022 | DF | (Serbia) Aleksandar Kolarov | 36 | Retired | | | |
| 1 July 2022 | DF | (Italy) Andrea Ranocchia | 34 | (Italy) Monza | Free | (Note: Transfer officialised on 21 June 2022.) | |
| 1 July 2022 | MF | (Italy) Lorenzo Gavioli | 22 | (Italy) Reggina | Undisclosed | | |
| 1 July 2022 | MF | (Croatia) Ivan Perišić | 33 | (England) Tottenham Hotspur | Free | (Note: Transfer officialised on 31 May 2022.) | |
| 1 July 2022 | MF | (Uruguay) Matías Vecino | 30 | (Italy) Lazio | Free | (Note: Contract expired on 1 July 2022. On 1 August 2022, Vecino joined Lazio on a free transfer.) | |
| 5 July 2022 | DF | (Italy) Niccolò Corrado | 22 | (Italy) Ternana | Undisclosed | (Note: Inter will retain a buy-back option on the player.) | |
| 8 July 2022 | DF | (Italy) Christian Dimarco | 19 | (Italy) Feralpisalò | Undisclosed | | |
| 11 July 2022 | MF | (Chile) Arturo Vidal | 35 | (Brazil) Flamengo | Free | (Note: Contract terminated by mutual consent on 11 July 2022. On 14 July 2022, Vidal joined Flamengo on a free transfer.) | |
| 15 July 2022 | DF | (Italy) Lorenzo Moretti | 20 | (Italy) Avellino | Undisclosed | | |
| 19 July 2022 | MF | (Italy) Nicolò Radaelli | 19 | (Italy) Pro Sesto | Undisclosed | | |
| 20 July 2022 | MF | (Italy) Riccardo Boscolo Chio | 20 | (Italy) Pro Sesto | Undisclosed | | |
| 30 July 2022 | DF | (Italy) Fabio Cortinovis | 20 | (Italy) Latina | Undisclosed | | |
| 8 August 2022 | FW | (Chile) Alexis Sánchez | 33 | (France) Marseille | Free | (Note: Contract terminated by mutual consent on 8 August 2022. On 10 August 2022, Sánchez officially joined Marseille on a free transfer.) | |
| 19 August 2022 | MF | (Italy) Cesare Casadei | 19 | (England) Chelsea | €15m | (Note: Chelsea is also expected to pay €5m of additional bonuses, reaching a potential €20m transfer fee.) | |
| 2 September 2022 | MF | (Haiti) Christopher Attys | 21 | (Italy) Imolese | Undisclosed | | |
Winter
| 31 January 2023 | FW | (Italy) Matias Fonseca | 21 | (Uruguay) Montevideo Wanderers | Undisclosed | | |

==== Loans out ====
| Date | Pos. | Player | Age | Loaned to | Fee | Notes | Source |
Summer
| 2 July 2022 | MF | (Italy) Stefano Sensi | 26 | (Italy) Monza | N/A | | |
| 4 July 2022 | FW | (Italy) Sebastiano Esposito | 20 | (Belgium) Anderlecht | N/A | (Note: Loan with option to buy and counter-option.) | |
| 4 July 2022 | FW | (Uruguay) Martín Satriano | 21 | (Italy) Empoli | N/A | | |
| 8 July 2022 | GK | (Romania) Ionuț Radu | 25 | (Italy) Cremonese | N/A | | |
| 9 July 2022 | MF | (Italy) Marco Pompetti | 22 | (Italy) Südtirol | N/A | | |
| 11 July 2022 | DF | (Argentina) Franco Carboni | 19 | (Italy) Cagliari | N/A | | |
| 13 July 2022 | GK | (Italy) William Rovida | 19 | (Italy) Carrarese | N/A | | |
| 15 July 2022 | MF | (Italy) Gaetano Oristanio | 19 | (Netherlands) Volendam | N/A | | |
| 15 July 2022 | MF | (Italy) Lorenzo Peschetola | 19 | (Italy) Foggia | N/A | | |
| 18 July 2022 | DF | (Kosovo) Andi Hoti | 19 | (Germany) SC Freiburg II | N/A | | |
| 19 July 2022 | GK | (Italy) Fabrizio Bagheria | 21 | (Italy) Recanatese | N/A | | |
| 19 July 2022 | MF | (Italy) Niccolò Squizzato | 20 | (Italy) Renate | N/A | | |
| 19 July 2022 | DF | (Italy) Andrea Moretti | 20 | (Italy) Pro Sesto | N/A | | |
| 20 July 2022 | MF | (Argentina) Franco Vezzoni | 20 | (Italy) Pro Patria | N/A | | |
| 20 July 2022 | GK | (Serbia) Filip Stanković | 20 | (Netherlands) Volendam | N/A | | |
| 21 July 2022 | MF | (Italy) Mattia Sangalli | 20 | (Italy) Lecco | N/A | | |
| 22 July 2022 | MF | (Italy) Francesco Nunziatini | 19 | (Italy) San Donato Tavarnelle | N/A | | |
| 22 July 2022 | MF | (Belgium) Tibo Persyn | 20 | (Netherlands) FC Eindhoven | N/A | | |
| 23 July 2022 | DF | (Italy) Davide Zugaro | 22 | (Italy) Sangiuliano City | N/A | | |
| 25 July 2022 | DF | (Italy) Alessandro Silvestro | 19 | (Italy) Pro Vercelli | N/A | | |
| 25 July 2022 | DF | (Italy) Edoardo Sottini | 19 | (Italy) Triestina | N/A | | |
| 25 July 2022 | FW | (Italy) Samuele Mulattieri | 21 | (Italy) Frosinone | N/A | | |
| 25 July 2022 | DF | (Belgium) Zinho Vanheusden | 22 | (Netherlands) AZ Alkmaar | N/A | | |
| 26 July 2022 | MF | (Italy) David Wieser | 20 | (Italy) Pro Sesto | N/A | | |
| 30 July 2022 | DF | (Italy) Lorenzo Pirola | 20 | (Italy) Salernitana | N/A | | |
| 30 July 2022 | MF | (Italy) Giovanni Fabbian | 19 | (Italy) Reggina | N/A | | |
| 1 August 2022 | MF | (Austria) Valentino Lazaro | 26 | (Italy) Torino | N/A | | |
| 11 August 2022 | FW | (Italy) Andrea Pinamonti | 23 | (Italy) Sassuolo | N/A | (Note: Loan with obligation to buy for a reported fee of €20m.) | |
| 1 September 2022 | FW | (Italy) Eddie Salcedo | 20 | (Italy) Bari | N/A | | |
| 1 September 2022 | MF | (France) Lucien Agoumé | 20 | (France) Troyes | N/A | | |
| 2 September 2022 | FW | (Italy) Matias Fonseca | 21 | (Italy) Imolese | N/A | | |
Winter
| 11 January 2023 | MF | (Italy) Mattia Sangalli | 20 | (Italy) Trento | N/A | | |
| 12 January 2023 | DF | (Italy) Alessandro Silvestro | 20 | (Italy) Montevarchi | N/A | | |
| 12 January 2023 | FW | (Argentina) Facundo Colidio | 23 | (Argentina) Tigre | N/A | | |
| 18 January 2023 | GK | (Italy) Fabrizio Bagheria | 21 | (Italy) Livorno | N/A | | |
| 24 January 2023 | DF | (Argentina) Franco Carboni | 19 | (Italy) Monza | N/A | | |
| 25 January 2023 | GK | (Romania) Ionuț Radu | 25 | (France) Auxerre | N/A | | |
| 31 January 2023 | FW | (Italy) Eddie Salcedo | 21 | (Italy) Genoa | N/A | | |
| 31 January 2023 | FW | (Italy) Sebastiano Esposito | 20 | (Italy) Bari | N/A | | |
| 31 January 2023 | GK | (Brazil) Gabriel Brazão | 22 | (Italy) SPAL | N/A | | |
| 31 January 2023 | DF | (Italy) Edoardo Sottini | 20 | (Italy) Avellino | N/A | | |
| 31 January 2023 | MF | (Italy) Lorenzo Peschetola | 19 | (Italy) Latina | N/A | | |

==== Loans ended ====
| Date | Pos. | Player | Age | Returning to | Notes | Source |
Summer
| 30 June 2022 | FW | (Ecuador) Felipe Caicedo | 33 | (Italy) Genoa | | |

== Pre-season and friendlies ==
Win Draw Loss Fixtures

| 9 July 2022 Training | Internazionale | 10–0 | FC Milanese | Appiano Gentile |
| | Correa; Lukaku; Martínez; Asllani; Fontanarosa; Sangalli; Pinamonti; Lazaro; Curatolo | Report | | Stadium: Centro Sportivo Suning |

| 12 July 2022 Friendly | Lugano | 1–4 | Internazionale | Lugano, Switzerland |
| 18:30 CEST (UTC+2) | Durrer (yellow card) 52'; Casciato 82' | Report | D'Ambrosio 3'; Martínez 16', 73'; Correa 61' | Stadium: Cornaredo Stadium; Attendance: 5,176; Referee: Luca Piccolo (Switzerland) |

| 16 July 2022 Friendly | Internazionale | 2–2 | Monaco | Ferrara, Italy |
| 20:30 CEST (UTC+2) | Gagliardini 42'; Asllani 59' | Report | Golovin 7'; Ben Yedder 30' | Stadium: Stadio Paolo Mazza; Referee: Matteo Marcenaro (Italy) |

| 21 July 2022 Training | Internazionale | 8–1 | Novara | Appiano Gentile |
| 18:30 CEST (UTC+2) | Barella 7'; Džeko 10'; Bellanova 22'; Martínez 48', 85'; Lukaku 51'; Ciancio 62' (o.g.); Zanotti 77' | Report | Bortolussi 56' (pen.) | Stadium: Centro Sportivo Suning |

| 23 July 2022 Friendly | Lens | 1–0 | Internazionale | Lens, France |
| 18:30 CEST (UTC+2) | Gradit (yellow card) 39'; Samba (yellow card) 56'; Berg (yellow card) 86'; Openda 90' | Report | Džeko (yellow card) 29'; Dumfries (yellow card) 56'; Brozović (yellow card) 61' | Stadium: Stade Bollaert-Delelis |

| 28 July 2022 Training | Internazionale | 6–1 | Pro Sesto | Appiano Gentile |
| 18:30 CEST (UTC+2) | Çalhanoğlu 15'; Martínez 22', 42'; Correa 62'; Bellanova 64'; Škriniar 71' | Report | Bruschi 4' | Stadium: Centro Sportivo Suning |

| 30 July 2022 Friendly | Internazionale | 2–2 | Lyon | Cesena, Italy |
| 20:30 CEST (UTC+2) | Dumfries (yellow card) 21'; Brozović (yellow card) 36'; Bastoni (yellow card) 40'; Lukaku 51'; Barella 65' | Report | Lacazette 31'; Toko Ekambi (yellow card) 33'; Paquetá (yellow card) 45+1'; Cherki 50' | Stadium: Stadio Dino Manuzzi; Referee: Marco Piccinini (Italy) |

| 3 August 2022 Training | Internazionale | 8–0 | Pergolettese | Appiano Gentile |
| 18:30 CEST (UTC+2) | Martínez 2', 23'; D'Ambrosio 5'; Džeko 10'; Bevilacqua 20' (o.g.); Gagliardini 36'; Çalhanoğlu 58'; Lukaku 80' | Report | | Stadium: Centro Sportivo Suning |

| 6 August 2022 Friendly | Internazionale | 2–4 | Villarreal | Pescara, Italy |
| 20:30 CEST (UTC+2) | Çalhanoğlu (yellow card) 22'; Lukaku 36'; D'Ambrosio 65', (yellow card) 78' | Report | Pedraza 29', 48'; Jackson (yellow card) 39', (goal) 81'; Coquelin 43' | Stadium: Stadio Adriatico – Giovanni Cornacchia; Referee: Antonio Rapuano (Italy) |

| 10 August 2022 Training | Internazionale | 11–0 | Sant'Angelo | Appiano Gentile |
| 18:30 CEST (UTC+2) | Džeko 3', 30'; Çalhanoğlu 11'; Lukaku 15'; Dumfries 40'; Mkhitaryan 59'; Gagliardini 64'; Martínez 69', 83'; Correa 78'; Casadei 80' | Report | | Stadium: Centro Sportivo Suning |

| 5 December 2022 Friendly | Gżira United | 1–6 | Internazionale | Paola, Malta |
| 18:00 CET (UTC+1) | Jefferson 32' | Report | Bellanova 16'; Asllani 25'; Çalhanoğlu 38'; Gosens 41'; Dimarco 69'; Mkhitaryan 89' | Stadium: Hibernians Stadium; Referee: Matthew De Gabriele (Malta) |

| 7 December 2022 Friendly | Internazionale | 4–0 | Red Bull Salzburg | Paola, Malta |
| 18:00 CET (UTC+1) | Mkhitaryan 20', 72'; Acerbi 41'; Carboni 90+1' | Report | | Stadium: Hibernians Stadium; Referee: Trustin Farrugia Cann (Malta) |

| 17 December 2022 Friendly | Real Betis | 1–1 | Internazionale | Seville, Spain |
| 18:00 CET (UTC+1) | Luiz Henrique (yellow card) 18'; Juanmi (yellow card) 52', (goal) 84' | Report | Škriniar (yellow card) 12'; Mkhitaryan (yellow card) 27'; Çalhanoğlu (yellow card) 41'; Barella (yellow card) 69'; Darmian 85' | Stadium: Benito Villamarín; Attendance: 16,589; Referee: Jorge Figueroa Vázquez (Spain) |

| 22 December 2022 Friendly | Reggina | 0–2 | Internazionale | Reggio Calabria, Italy |
| 18:00 CET (UTC+1) | | Report | Džeko 80'; Lukaku 87' | Stadium: Stadio Oreste Granillo; Referee: Francesco Cosso (Italy) |

| 29 December 2022 Friendly | Sassuolo | 0–1 | Internazionale | Reggio Emilia, Italy |
| 17:00 CET (UTC+1) | Traorè (yellow card) 33' | Report | Džeko 63'; Škriniar (yellow card) 67'; Barella (yellow card) 79'; Zanotti (yellow card) 90+2' | Stadium: Mapei Stadium – Città del Tricolore; Referee: Lorenzo Maggioni (Italy) |

== Competitions ==
=== Overview ===
| Competition | First match | Last match | Starting round | Final position | Record | | | | | | | |
| Competition | First match | Last match | Starting round | Final position | Pld | W | D | L | GF | GA | GD | Win % |
|---|---|---|---|---|---|---|---|---|---|---|---|---|
| Serie A | 13 August 2022 | 3 June 2023 | Matchday 1 | 3rd | 38 | 23 | 3 | 12 | 71 | 42 | +29 | 60.53 |
| Coppa Italia | 10 January 2023 | 24 May 2023 | Round of 16 | Winners | 5 | 4 | 1 | 0 | 7 | 3 | +4 | 80.00 |
| Supercoppa Italiana | 18 January 2023 | | Final | Winners | 1 | 1 | 0 | 0 | 3 | 0 | +3 | 100.00 |
| UEFA Champions League | 7 September 2022 | 10 June 2023 | Group stage | Runners-up | 13 | 7 | 3 | 3 | 19 | 11 | +8 | 53.85 |
| Total | | | | | 57 | 35 | 7 | 15 | 100 | 56 | +44 | 61.40 |

Source: Soccerway

=== Serie A ===
==== League table ====
| Pos | Team | Pld | W | D | L | GF | GA | GD | Pts | Qualification or relegation |
|---|---|---|---|---|---|---|---|---|---|---|
| 1 | Napoli (C) | 38 | 28 | 6 | 4 | 77 | 28 | +49 | 90 | Qualification for the Champions League group stage (Note: Should the first and second, or 17th and 18th-placed teams at the end of the season be tied on points, a play-off tiebreaker match was held at a neutral site to determine the title and final team relegated respectively.) |
| 2 | Lazio | 38 | 22 | 8 | 8 | 60 | 30 | +30 | 74 | Qualification for the Champions League group stage |
| 3 | Inter Milan | 38 | 23 | 3 | 12 | 71 | 42 | +29 | 72 | Qualification for the Champions League group stage |
| 4 | Milan | 38 | 20 | 10 | 8 | 64 | 43 | +21 | 70 | Qualification for the Champions League group stage |
| 5 | Atalanta | 38 | 19 | 7 | 12 | 66 | 48 | +18 | 64 | Qualification for the Europa League group stage (Note: Since the winners of the 2022–23 Coppa Italia, Inter Milan, qualified for the Champions League, the Europa League berth awarded to the Coppa Italia winners was passed to the sixth-placed team, and the Europa Conference League berth awarded to the sixth-placed team was passed to the seventh-placed team.) |

Source: Serie A
Rules for classification: 1) Points; 2) Tiebreaker for Champions team and third relegated team; 3) Head-to-head points; 4) Head-to-head goal difference; 5) Goal difference; 6) Goals scored; 7) Draw. (Note: Head-to-head record is used only after all the matches between the teams in question have been played)
(C) Champions

==== Results summary ====
| Overall | | | | | | | | Home | | | | | | Away | | | | | |
| Pld | W | D | L | GF | GA | GD | Pts | W | D | L | GF | GA | GD | W | D | L | GF | GA | GD |
|---|---|---|---|---|---|---|---|---|---|---|---|---|---|---|---|---|---|---|---|
| 38 | 23 | 3 | 12 | 71 | 42 | +29 | 72 | 14 | 0 | 5 | 37 | 14 | +23 | 9 | 3 | 7 | 34 | 28 | +6 |

Source: Serie A

==== Results by round ====
| Round | 1 | 2 | 3 | 4 | 5 | 6 | 7 | 8 | 9 | 10 | 11 | 12 | 13 | 14 | 15 | 16 | 17 | 18 | 19 | 20 | 21 | 22 | 23 | 24 | 25 | 26 | 27 | 28 | 29 | 30 | 31 | 32 | 33 | 34 | 35 | 36 | 37 | 38 |
|---|---|---|---|---|---|---|---|---|---|---|---|---|---|---|---|---|---|---|---|---|---|---|---|---|---|---|---|---|---|---|---|---|---|---|---|---|---|---|
| Ground | A | H | A | H | A | H | A | H | A | H | A | H | A | H | A | H | A | H | H | A | H | A | H | A | H | A | H | H | A | H | A | H | A | A | H | A | H | A |
| Result | W | W | L | W | L | W | L | L | W | W | W | W | L | W | W | W | D | W | L | W | W | D | W | L | W | L | L | L | D | L | W | W | W | W | W | L | W | W |
| Position | 6 | 2 | 7 | 3 | 8 | 6 | 7 | 9 | 7 | 7 | 7 | 6 | 7 | 5 | 5 | 4 | 4 | 4 | 4 | 2 | 2 | 2 | 2 | 2 | 2 | 2 | 3 | 4 | 5 | 5 | 6 | 4 | 4 | 4 | 3 | 3 | 3 | 3 |

Source: Serie A
A = Away; H = Home; W = Win; D = Draw; L = Loss

==== Matches ====
The league fixtures were announced on 24 June 2022.

| 13 August 2022 1 | Lecce | 1–2 | Internazionale | Lecce |
| 20:45 CEST (UTC+2) | Baschirotto (yellow card) 32'; Ceesay 48'; Blin (yellow card) 82'; Colombo (yellow card) 87'; Hjulmand (yellow card) 90+5' | Report | Lukaku 2'; Brozović (yellow card) 55'; Darmian (yellow card) 63'; Dumfries 90+5' | Stadium: Stadio Via del mare Attendance: 25,353; Referee: Alessandro Prontera |

| 20 August 2022 2 | Internazionale | 3–0 | Spezia | Milan |
| 20:45 CEST (UTC+2) | Martínez 37'; Çalhanoğlu 52'; Correa 82' | Report | | Stadium: San Siro; Attendance: 71,212; Referee: Davide Ghersini |

| 26 August 2022 3 | Lazio | 3–1 | Internazionale | Rome |
| 20:45 CEST (UTC+2) | Felipe Anderson 40'; Zaccagni (yellow card) 57'; Marušić (yellow card) 64'; Luis Alberto 75'; Pedro 86' | Report | Martínez 51'; Brozović (yellow card) 84' | Stadium: Stadio Olimpico; Attendance: 50,000; Referee: Michael Fabbri |

| 30 August 2022 4 | Internazionale | 3–1 | Cremonese | Milan |
| 20:45 CEST (UTC+2) | Correa 12'; Barella 38'; Martínez 76' | Report | Dessers (yellow card) 50'; Aiwu (yellow card) 66'; Vásquez (yellow card) 79'; Okereke 90' | Stadium: San Siro; Attendance: 70,750; Referee: Francesco Fourneau |

| 3 September 2022 5 | Milan | 3–2 | Internazionale | Milan |
| 18:00 CEST (UTC+2) | Hernandez (yellow card) 9'; Leão 28', 60', (yellow card) 90+4'; Giroud (yellow card) 32', (goal) 54'; De Ketelaere (yellow card) 51'; Tonali (yellow card) 77' | Report | Dumfries (yellow card) 9'; Brozović 21', (yellow card) 39'; Džeko 67' | Stadium: San Siro; Attendance: 75,475; Referee: Daniele Chiffi |

| 10 September 2022 6 | Internazionale | 1–0 | Torino | Milan |
| 18:00 CEST (UTC+2) | Brozović (yellow card) 55', (goal) 89' | Report | Sanabria (yellow card) 51'; Lukić (yellow card) 68' | Stadium: San Siro; Attendance: 69,134; Referee: Giovanni Ayroldi |

| 18 September 2022 7 | Udinese | 3–1 | Internazionale | Udine |
| 12:30 CEST (UTC+2) | Škriniar 22' (o.g.); Pereyra (yellow card) 40'; Udogie (yellow card) 51'; Becão (yellow card) 56'; Bijol 85'; Arslan 90+3' | Report | Barella 5'; Bastoni (yellow card) 13'; Mkhitaryan (yellow card) 21'; Darmian (yellow card) 45+1'; Brozović (yellow card) 57' | Stadium: Stadio Friuli; Attendance: 22,475; Referee: Paolo Valeri |

| 1 October 2022 8 | Internazionale | 1–2 | Roma | Milan |
| 18:00 CEST (UTC+2) | Dimarco 30'; Asllani (yellow card) 72'; Correa (yellow card) 87'; Gosens (yellow card) 90'; Barella (yellow card) 90+2' | Report | Dybala 39'; Zaniolo (yellow card) 54'; Mancini (yellow card) 62'; Smalling (yellow card) 65', (goal) 75' | Stadium: San Siro; Attendance: 75,389; Referee: Davide Massa |

| 8 October 2022 9 | Sassuolo | 1–2 | Internazionale | Reggio Emilia |
| 15:00 CEST (UTC+2) | Ferrari (yellow card) 21'; Frattesi 60'; Harroui (yellow card) 72'; Ruan (yellow card) 90+4' | Report | Asllani (yellow card) 19'; Džeko 44', 75'; D'Ambrosio (yellow card) 55' | Stadium: Mapei Stadium – Città del Tricolore; Attendance: 17,574; Referee: Simone Sozza |

| 16 October 2022 10 | Internazionale | 2–0 | Salernitana | Milan |
| 12:30 CEST (UTC+2) | Martínez 14'; Barella 58' | Report | Daniliuc (yellow card) 17' | Stadium: San Siro; Attendance: 75,425; Referee: Juan Luca Sacchi |

| 22 October 2022 11 | Fiorentina | 3–4 | Internazionale | Florence |
| 20:45 CEST (UTC+2) | Cabral 33' (pen.); Bonaventura (yellow card) 36'; Dodô (yellow card) 38'; Amrabat (yellow card) 54'; Ikoné 60'; Milenković (yellow card) 79'; Jović 90' | Report | Barella 2', (yellow card) 56'; Martínez 15', 73' (pen.); Acerbi (yellow card) 36'; Dumfries (yellow card) 88'; Mkhitaryan 90+5' | Stadium: Stadio Artemio Franchi; Attendance: 36,699; Referee: Paolo Valeri |

| 29 October 2022 12 | Internazionale | 3–0 | Sampdoria | Milan |
| 20:45 CET (UTC+1) | De Vrij 21'; Barella 44'; Bastoni (yellow card) 63'; Correa 73' | Report | Yepes (yellow card) 19'; Colley (yellow card) 40'; Đuričić (yellow card) 52'; Verre (yellow card) 57'; Gabbiadini (yellow card) 61'; Vieira (yellow card) 67' | Stadium: San Siro; Attendance: 73,311; Referee: Luca Massimi |

| 6 November 2022 13 | Juventus | 2–0 | Internazionale | Turin |
| 20:45 CET (UTC+1) | Rabiot 52'; Danilo (yellow card) 77'; Fagioli 85'; Szczęsny (yellow card) 90' | Report | Çalhanoğlu (yellow card) 56'; Škriniar (yellow card) 68' | Stadium: Juventus Stadium; Attendance: 40,387; Referee: Daniele Doveri |

| 9 November 2022 14 | Internazionale | 6–1 | Bologna | Milan |
| 20:45 CET (UTC+1) | Džeko 26'; Dimarco 36', 48'; Martínez (yellow card) 35', (goal) 42'; Çalhanoğlu 59' (pen.); Gosens 76' | Report | Lykogiannis 22'; Arnautović (yellow card) 32'; Lucumí (yellow card) 33'; Medel (yellow card) 35'; Orsolini (yellow card) 54'; Sosa (yellow card) 59' | Stadium: San Siro; Attendance: 69,312; Referee: Andrea Colombo |

| 13 November 2022 15 | Atalanta | 2–3 | Internazionale | Bergamo |
| 12:30 CET (UTC+1) | Lookman 25' (pen.); Palomino 77' | Report | Džeko 36', 56'; Palomino 61' (o.g.); De Vrij (yellow card) 74'; Škriniar (yellow card) 85'; Onana (yellow card) 87' | Stadium: Gewiss Stadium; Attendance: 19,353; Referee: Daniele Chiffi |

| 4 January 2023 16 | Internazionale | 1–0 | Napoli | Milan |
| 20:45 CET (UTC+1) | Džeko (yellow card) 27', (goal) 56'; Barella (yellow card) 84'; Dumfries (yellow card) 87' | Report | Di Lorenzo (yellow card) 85'; Kim (yellow card) 88' | Stadium: San Siro; Attendance: 75,479; Referee: Simone Sozza |

| 7 January 2023 17 | Monza | 2–2 | Internazionale | Monza |
| 20:45 CET (UTC+1) | Ciurria 11'; Dumfries 90+3' (o.g.) | Report | Darmian 10'; Martínez 22'; Mkhitaryan (yellow card) 71'; Gagliardini (yellow card) 77'; Škriniar (yellow card) 87' | Stadium: Stadio Brianteo; Attendance: 13,622; Referee: Juan Luca Sacchi |

| 14 January 2023 18 | Internazionale | 1–0 | Hellas Verona | Milan |
| 20:45 CET (UTC+1) | Martínez 3' | Report | Dawidowicz (yellow card) 49'; Hien (yellow card) 53'; Sulemana (yellow card) 90' | Stadium: San Siro; Attendance: 70,734; Referee: Michael Fabbri |

| 23 January 2023 19 | Internazionale | 0–1 | Empoli | Milan |
| 20:45 CET (UTC+1) | Škriniar (yellow card) 25' (yellow-red card) 40'; Barella (yellow card) 68'; Džeko (yellow card) 89' | Report | Henderson (yellow card) 30'; Akpa Akpro (yellow card) 31'; Parisi (yellow card) 45+1'; Baldanzi 66' | Stadium: San Siro; Attendance: 65,476; Referee: Antonio Rapuano |

| 28 January 2023 20 | Cremonese | 1–2 | Internazionale | Cremona |
| 18:00 CET (UTC+1) | Okereke 11' | Report | Martínez 21', 65'; Acerbi (yellow card) 29'; Çalhanoğlu (yellow card) 38' | Stadium: Stadio Giovanni Zini; Attendance: 14,554; Referee: Maurizio Mariani |

| 5 February 2023 21 | Internazionale | 1–0 | Milan | Milan |
| 20:45 CET (UTC+1) | Martínez 34'; Mkhitaryan (yellow card) 67'; Acerbi (yellow card) 68' | Report | Kalulu (yellow card) 32'; Gabbia (yellow card) 49'; Leão (yellow card) 62'; Giroud (yellow card) 84'; Rebić (yellow card) 88' | Stadium: San Siro; Attendance: 75,584; Referee: Davide Massa |

| 13 February 2023 22 | Sampdoria | 0–0 | Internazionale | Genoa |
| 20:45 CET (UTC+1) | Nuytinck (yellow card) 51'; Amione (yellow card) 78'; Lammers (yellow card) 83' | Report | Martínez (yellow card) 64' | Stadium: Stadio Luigi Ferraris; Attendance: 21,575; Referee: Fabio Maresca |

| 18 February 2023 23 | Internazionale | 3–1 | Udinese | Milan |
| 20:45 CET (UTC+1) | Lukaku 20' (pen.), (yellow card) 22'; Darmian (yellow card) 39'; Mkhitaryan 73'; Martínez 89' | Report | Masina (yellow card) 22'; Lovrić 43'; Bijol (yellow card) 47' | Stadium: San Siro; Attendance: 71,248; Referee: Federico Dionisi |

| 26 February 2023 24 | Bologna | 1–0 | Internazionale | Bologna |
| 12:30 CET (UTC+1) | Orsolini 76'; Domínguez (yellow card) 85' | Report | De Vrij (yellow card) 45+1'; Dumfries (yellow card) 63' | Stadium: Stadio Renato Dall'Ara; Attendance: 28,317; Referee: Daniele Orsato |

| 5 March 2023 25 | Internazionale | 2–0 | Lecce | Milan |
| 18:00 CET (UTC+1) | Mkhitaryan 29'; Martínez 53' | Report | | Stadium: San Siro; Attendance: 75,033; Referee: Gianluca Manganiello |

| 10 March 2023 26 | Spezia | 2–1 | Internazionale | La Spezia |
| 20:45 CET (UTC+1) | Gyasi (yellow card) 6'; Caldara (yellow card) 12'; Maldini 55'; Nikolaou (yellow card) 71'; Nzola 87' (pen.) | Report | Martínez (penalty missed) 14'; Lukaku 83' (pen.) | Stadium: Stadio Alberto Picco; Attendance: 11,767; Referee: Livio Marinelli |

| 19 March 2023 27 | Internazionale | 0–1 | Juventus | Milan |
| 20:45 CET (UTC+1) | Barella (yellow card) 30'; Brozović (yellow card) 90+7'; D'Ambrosio (yellow card) 90+7' (red card) 90+7' | Report | Kostić 23'; Gatti (yellow card) 31'; Rabiot (yellow card) 71'; Danilo (yellow card) 88'; Paredes (yellow card) 90+1' (red card) 90+7' | Stadium: San Siro; Attendance: 75,224; Referee: Daniele Chiffi |

| 1 April 2023 28 | Internazionale | 0–1 | Fiorentina | Milan |
| 18:00 CEST (UTC+2) | Brozović (yellow card) 77'; Acerbi (yellow card) 90+4' | Report | Bonaventura 53'; Castrovilli (yellow card) 58'; Ikoné (yellow card) 76'; Amrabat (yellow card) 79' | Stadium: San Siro; Attendance: 73,576; Referee: Fabio Maresca |

| 7 April 2023 29 | Salernitana | 1–1 | Internazionale | Salerno |
| 17:00 CEST (UTC+2) | Coulibaly (yellow card) 38'; Nicolussi (yellow card) 70'; Candreva 90' | Report | Gosens 6'; De Vrij (yellow card) 34'; Gagliardini (yellow card) 89' | Stadium: Stadio Arechi; Attendance: 23,100; Referee: Michael Fabbri |

| 15 April 2023 30 | Internazionale | 0–1 | Monza | Milan |
| 20:45 CEST (UTC+2) | Mkhitaryan (yellow card) 66'; Brozović (yellow card) 80' | Report | Izzo (yellow card) 44'; Caprari (yellow card) 62'; Caldirola 78' | Stadium: San Siro; Attendance: 74,135; Referee: Luca Pairetto |

| 23 April 2023 31 | Empoli | 0–3 | Internazionale | Empoli |
| 12:30 CEST (UTC+2) | Parisi (yellow card) 32' | Report | Lukaku 48', 76'; Barella (yellow card) 81'; Martínez 88' | Stadium: Stadio Carlo Castellani; Attendance: 15,337; Referee: Livio Marinelli |

| 30 April 2023 32 | Internazionale | 3–1 | Lazio | Milan |
| 12:30 CEST (UTC+2) | D'Ambrosio (yellow card) 35'; Bastoni (yellow card) 62'; Martínez 78', 90'; Gosens 83' | Report | Zaccagni (yellow card) 20'; Felipe Anderson 30'; Marušić (yellow card) 81'; Luis Alberto (yellow card) 83'; Romagnoli (yellow card) 90+8' | Stadium: San Siro; Attendance: 75,500; Referee: Marco Guida |

| 3 May 2023 33 | Hellas Verona | 0–6 | Internazionale | Verona |
| 21:00 CEST (UTC+2) | | Report | Gaich 31' (o.g.); Çalhanoğlu 36'; Džeko 38', 61'; Martínez 55', 90+2' | Stadium: Stadio Marcantonio Bentegodi; Attendance: 19,409; Referee: Daniele Orsato |

| 6 May 2023 34 | Roma | 0–2 | Internazionale | Rome |
| 18:00 CEST (UTC+2) | Mancini (yellow card) 27'; Pellegrini (yellow card) 58'; Spinazzola (yellow card) 77' | Report | Dimarco 33'; Martínez (yellow card) 65'; Lukaku 74'; Gagliardini (yellow card) 84' | Stadium: Stadio Olimpico; Attendance: 61,870; Referee: Fabio Maresca |

| 13 May 2023 35 | Internazionale | 4–2 | Sassuolo | Milan |
| 20:45 CEST (UTC+2) | Lukaku 41', 89'; Ruan 55' (o.g.); Martínez 58'; De Vrij (yellow card) 70'; Brozović (yellow card) 84' | Report | Defrel (yellow card) 30'; Ruan (yellow card) 42'; Matheus Henrique 63', (yellow card) 66'; Frattesi 77' | Stadium: San Siro; Attendance: 71,246; Referee: Matteo Marcenaro |

| 21 May 2023 36 | Napoli | 3–1 | Internazionale | Naples |
| 18:00 CEST (UTC+2) | Elmas (yellow card) 64'; Zambo Anguissa 67'; Di Lorenzo 85'; Gaetano 90+4' | Report | Gagliardini (yellow card) 19' (yellow-red card) 41'; Lukaku 82' | Stadium: Stadio Diego Armando Maradona; Attendance: 50,653; Referee: Livio Marinelli |

| 27 May 2023 37 | Internazionale | 3–2 | Atalanta | Milan |
| 20:45 CEST (UTC+2) | Lukaku 1'; Barella 3'; Martínez 77' | Report | Pašalić 36'; Tolói (yellow card) 58'; Onana 90+1' (o.g.) | Stadium: San Siro; Attendance: 72,192; Referee: Daniele Orsato |

| 3 June 2023 38 | Torino | 0–1 | Internazionale | Turin |
| 18:30 CEST (UTC+2) | Singo (yellow card) 58' | Report | Brozović 37'; Çalhanoğlu (yellow card) 50'; Gosens (yellow card) 68' | Stadium: Stadio Olimpico Grande Torino; Attendance: 24,528; Referee: Michael Fabbri |

=== Coppa Italia ===
| 10 January 2023 Round of 16 | Internazionale | 2–1 (a.e.t.) | Parma | Milan |
| 21:00 CET (UTC+1) | Martínez 88'; Dimarco (yellow card) 105'; Acerbi 110' | Report | Jurić 38'; Bernabé (yellow card) 45+1'; Camara (yellow card) 79' | Stadium: San Siro; Attendance: 40,032; Referee: Alessandro Prontera |

| 31 January 2023 Quarter-finals | Internazionale | 1–0 | Atalanta | Milan |
| 21:00 CET (UTC+1) | Gosens (yellow card) 32'; Darmian 57'; Martínez (yellow card) 82'; Correa (yellow card) 90+1'; Onana (yellow card) 90+4' | Report | Soppy (yellow card) 90' | Stadium: San Siro; Attendance: 49,515; Referee: Daniele Chiffi |

| 4 April 2023 Semi-finals; First leg | Juventus | 1–1 | Internazionale | Turin |
| 21:00 CEST (UTC+2) | Cuadrado 83', (yellow card) 90+5', (red card) 90+7'; Miretti (yellow card) 89' | Report | Brozović (yellow card) 41'; Lukaku (yellow card) 80' (yellow-red card) 90+5', (goal) 90+5' (pen.); Handanović (red card) 90+7' | Stadium: Juventus Stadium; Attendance: 39,021; Referee: Davide Massa |
Note: Cuadrado and Handanović both received red cards following the final whistle.

| 26 April 2023 Semi-finals; Second leg | Internazionale | 1–0 (2–1 agg.) | Juventus | Milan |
| 21:00 CEST (UTC+2) | Dimarco 15'; Mkhitaryan (yellow card) 90+2' | Report | Locatelli (yellow card) 52' | Stadium: San Siro; Attendance: 75,491; Referee: Daniele Doveri |

| 24 May 2023 Final | Fiorentina | 1–2 | Internazionale | Rome |
| 21:00 CEST (UTC+2) | González 3', (yellow card) 90'; Martínez Quarta (yellow card) 54' | Report | Martínez 29', 37'; Bastoni (yellow card) 53' | Stadium: Stadio Olimpico; Attendance: 68,500; Referee: Massimiliano Irrati |

=== Supercoppa Italiana ===
| 18 January 2023 Final | Milan | 0–3 | Internazionale | Riyadh, Saudi Arabia |
| 20:00 CET (UTC+1) | Hernandez (yellow card) 77'; Tonali (yellow card) 85' | Report | Dimarco 10'; Džeko 21'; Barella (yellow card) 33'; Çalhanoğlu (yellow card) 72'; Martínez 77', (yellow card) 79' | Stadium: King Fahd International Stadium; Attendance: 51,357; Referee: Fabio Maresca |

=== UEFA Champions League ===
==== Group stage ====
The draw for the group stage was held on 25 August 2022.

| Pos | Team | Pld | W | D | L | GF | GA | GD | Pts | Qualification | BAY | INT | BAR | PLZ |
|---|---|---|---|---|---|---|---|---|---|---|---|---|---|---|
| 1 | (Germany) Bayern Munich | 6 | 6 | 0 | 0 | 18 | 2 | +16 | 18 | Advance to knockout phase | — | 2–0 | 2–0 | 5–0 |
| 2 | (Italy) Inter Milan | 6 | 3 | 1 | 2 | 10 | 7 | +3 | 10 | Advance to knockout phase | 0–2 | — | 1–0 | 4–0 |
| 3 | (Spain) Barcelona | 6 | 2 | 1 | 3 | 12 | 12 | 0 | 7 | Transfer to Europa League | 0–3 | 3–3 | — | 5–1 |
| 4 | (Czech Republic) Viktoria Plzeň | 6 | 0 | 0 | 6 | 5 | 24 | −19 | 0 | | 2–4 | 0–2 | 2–4 | — |

Source: UEFA
Rules for classification: Group stage tiebreakers

| 7 September 2022 1 | Internazionale (Italy) | 0–2 | (Germany) Bayern Munich | Milan, Italy |
| 21:00 CEST (UTC+2) | Dimarco (yellow card) 90' | Report | Sané 25'; De Ligt (yellow card) 41'; D'Ambrosio 66' (o.g.) | Stadium: San Siro; Attendance: 58,951; Referee: Clément Turpin (France) |

| 13 September 2022 2 | Viktoria Plzeň (Czech Republic) | 0–2 | (Italy) Internazionale | Plzeň, Czech Republic |
| 18:45 CEST (UTC+2) | Sýkora (yellow card) 12'; Kalvach (yellow card) 15'; Jemelka (yellow card) 22'; Bucha (red card) 61' | Report | Džeko 20'; Bastoni (yellow card) 60'; Dumfries 70'; Gagliardini (yellow card) 78' | Stadium: Doosan Arena; Attendance: 11,252; Referee: Sandro Schärer (Switzerland) |

| 4 October 2022 3 | Internazionale (Italy) | 1–0 | (Spain) Barcelona | Milan, Italy |
| 21:00 CEST (UTC+2) | Barella (yellow card) 23'; Çalhanoğlu 45+2', (yellow card) 70'; Martínez (yellow card) 76'; Bastoni (yellow card) 88'; Onana (yellow card) 90+6' | Report | Busquets (yellow card) 60'; Gavi (yellow card) 76' | Stadium: San Siro; Attendance: 71,360; Referee: Slavko Vinčić (Slovenia) |

| 12 October 2022 4 | Barcelona (Spain) | 3–3 | (Italy) Internazionale | Barcelona, Spain |
| 21:00 CEST (UTC+2) | Dembélé 40', (yellow card) 78'; Roberto (yellow card) 72'; Lewandowski 82', 90+2' | Report | Barella 50'; Martínez (yellow card) 52', (goal) 63'; De Vrij (yellow card) 55'; Mkhitaryan (yellow card) 84'; Gosens 89' | Stadium: Camp Nou; Attendance: 92,302; Referee: Szymon Marciniak (Poland) |

| 26 October 2022 5 | Internazionale (Italy) | 4–0 | (Czech Republic) Viktoria Plzeň | Milan, Italy |
| 18:45 CEST (UTC+2) | Mkhitaryan 35'; Džeko 42', 66'; Lukaku 87' | Report | Mosquera (yellow card) 45+1'; Pernica (yellow card) 49' | Stadium: San Siro; Attendance: 71,849; Referee: Andreas Ekberg (Sweden) |

| 1 November 2022 6 | Bayern Munich (Germany) | 2–0 | (Italy) Internazionale | Munich, Germany |
| 21:00 CET (UTC+1) | Pavard 32'; Sabitzer (yellow card) 38'; Kimmich (yellow card) 48'; Choupo-Moting 72'; Stanišić (yellow card) 88' | Report | Gosens (yellow card) 40'; Carboni (yellow card) 90' | Stadium: Allianz Arena; Attendance: 75,000; Referee: Ivan Kružliak (Slovakia) |

==== Knockout phase ====
===== Round of 16 =====
The draw for the round of 16 was held on 7 November 2022.

| 22 February 2023 First leg | Internazionale (Italy) | 1–0 | (Portugal) Porto | Milan, Italy |
| 21:00 CET (UTC+1) | Dimarco (yellow card) 41'; Lukaku 86' | Report | Otávio (yellow card) 41' (yellow-red card) 78'; Pepê (yellow card) 63' | Stadium: San Siro; Attendance: 75,374; Referee: Srđan Jovanović (Serbia) |

| 14 March 2023 Second leg | Porto (Portugal) | 0–0 (0–1 agg.) | (Italy) Internazionale | Porto, Portugal |
| 20:00 WET (UTC±0) | Pepê (yellow card) 79' (yellow-red card) 90+7' | Report | Darmian (yellow card) 33'; Džeko (yellow card) 69'; Acerbi (yellow card) 90' | Stadium: Estádio do Dragão; Attendance: 48,015; Referee: Szymon Marciniak (Poland) |

===== Quarter-finals =====
The draw for the quarter-finals was held on 17 March 2023.

| 11 April 2023 First leg | Benfica (Portugal) | 0–2 | (Italy) Internazionale | Lisbon, Portugal |
| 20:00 WEST (UTC+1) | A. Silva (yellow card) 22' | Report | Brozović (yellow card) 50'; Barella 51'; Lukaku 82' (pen.); Džeko (yellow card) 83' | Stadium: Estádio da Luz; Attendance: 62,594; Referee: Michael Oliver (England) |

| 19 April 2023 Second leg | Internazionale (Italy) | 3–3 (5–3 agg.) | (Portugal) Benfica | Milan, Italy |
| 21:00 CEST (UTC+2) | Barella 14'; Martínez 65'; Correa 78' | Report | Aursnes 38'; R. Silva (yellow card) 49'; Musa (yellow card) 81', (goal) 90+5'; A. Silva 86'; Neres (yellow card) 90+5' | Stadium: San Siro; Attendance: 75,380; Referee: Carlos del Cerro Grande (Spain) |

===== Semi-finals =====
The draw for the semi-finals was held on 17 March 2023, after the draw for the quarter-finals.

| 10 May 2023 First leg | Milan (Italy) | 0–2 | (Italy) Internazionale | Milan, Italy |
| 21:00 CEST (UTC+2) | Krunić (yellow card) 45+1'; Tomori (yellow card) 64' | Report | Džeko 8'; Mkhitaryan 11', (yellow card) 45+1' | Stadium: San Siro; Attendance: 75,532; Referee: Jesús Gil Manzano (Spain) |

| 16 May 2023 Second leg | Internazionale (Italy) | 1–0 (3–0 agg.) | (Italy) Milan | Milan, Italy |
| 21:00 CEST (UTC+2) | Martínez 74', (yellow card) 82'; Barella (yellow card) 79' | Report | Thiaw (yellow card) 56'; Tonali (yellow card) 79'; Krunić (yellow card) 81'; Tomori (yellow card) 82' | Stadium: San Siro; Attendance: 75,567; Referee: Clément Turpin (France) |

===== Final =====
| 10 June 2023 Final | Manchester City (England) | 1–0 | (Italy) Internazionale | Istanbul, Turkey |
| 21:00 CEST (UTC+2) | Rodri 68'; Haaland (yellow card) 90+2'; Ederson (yellow card) 90+4' | Report | Barella (yellow card) 59'; Lukaku (yellow card) 83'; Onana (yellow card) 90+2' | Stadium: Atatürk Olympic Stadium; Attendance: 71,412; Referee: Szymon Marciniak (Poland) |

== Statistics ==
=== Appearances and goals ===
| No. | Pos | Nat | Player | Total | | Serie A | | Coppa Italia | | Supercoppa Italiana | | Champions League | |
| No. | Pos | Nat | Player | Apps | Goals | Apps | Goals | Apps | Goals | Apps | Goals | Apps | Goals |
Goalkeepers
| 1 | GK | (Slovenia) SLO | Samir Handanović | 16 | 0 | 14 | 0 | 2 | 0 | 0 | 0 | 0 | 0 |
| 21 | GK | (Italy) ITA | Alex Cordaz | 1 | 0 | 0+1 | 0 | 0 | 0 | 0 | 0 | 0 | 0 |
| 24 | GK | (Cameroon) CMR | André Onana | 41 | 0 | 24 | 0 | 3 | 0 | 1 | 0 | 13 | 0 |
Defenders
| 2 | DF | (Netherlands) NED | Denzel Dumfries | 51 | 2 | 25+9 | 1 | 4+1 | 0 | 0 | 0 | 10+2 | 1 |
| 6 | DF | (Netherlands) NED | Stefan de Vrij | 38 | 1 | 22+5 | 1 | 2+1 | 0 | 0+1 | 0 | 3+4 | 0 |
| 8 | DF | (Germany) GER | Robin Gosens | 49 | 4 | 11+21 | 3 | 2+3 | 0 | 0+1 | 0 | 3+8 | 1 |
| 12 | DF | (Italy) ITA | Raoul Bellanova | 22 | 0 | 3+15 | 0 | 0+1 | 0 | 0 | 0 | 1+2 | 0 |
| 15 | DF | (Italy) ITA | Francesco Acerbi | 49 | 1 | 25+6 | 0 | 4+1 | 1 | 1 | 0 | 10+2 | 0 |
| 32 | DF | (Italy) ITA | Federico Dimarco | 50 | 6 | 26+7 | 4 | 3+2 | 1 | 1 | 1 | 10+1 | 0 |
| 33 | DF | (Italy) ITA | Danilo D'Ambrosio | 24 | 0 | 8+7 | 0 | 2+1 | 0 | 0 | 0 | 1+5 | 0 |
| 36 | DF | (Italy) ITA | Matteo Darmian | 48 | 2 | 24+7 | 1 | 4+1 | 1 | 1 | 0 | 9+2 | 0 |
| 37 | DF | (Slovakia) SVK | Milan Škriniar | 31 | 0 | 20+1 | 0 | 0+1 | 0 | 1 | 0 | 6+2 | 0 |
| 46 | DF | (Italy) ITA | Mattia Zanotti | 2 | 0 | 0+2 | 0 | 0 | 0 | 0 | 0 | 0 | 0 |
| 47 | DF | (Italy) ITA | Alessandro Fontanarosa | 0 | 0 | 0 | 0 | 0 | 0 | 0 | 0 | 0 | 0 |
| 95 | DF | (Italy) ITA | Alessandro Bastoni | 45 | 0 | 26+3 | 0 | 4 | 0 | 1 | 0 | 11 | 0 |
Midfielders
| 5 | MF | (Italy) ITA | Roberto Gagliardini | 29 | 0 | 7+12 | 0 | 1+2 | 0 | 0+1 | 0 | 1+5 | 0 |
| 14 | MF | (Albania) ALB | Kristjan Asllani | 29 | 0 | 5+15 | 0 | 1+2 | 0 | 0+1 | 0 | 1+4 | 0 |
| 20 | MF | (Turkey) TUR | Hakan Çalhanoğlu | 49 | 4 | 28+5 | 3 | 3 | 0 | 1 | 0 | 9+3 | 1 |
| 22 | MF | (Armenia) ARM | Henrikh Mkhitaryan | 49 | 5 | 24+7 | 3 | 4 | 0 | 1 | 0 | 11+2 | 2 |
| 23 | MF | (Italy) ITA | Nicolò Barella | 52 | 9 | 31+4 | 6 | 4 | 0 | 1 | 0 | 12 | 3 |
| 45 | MF | (Argentina) ARG | Valentín Carboni | 6 | 0 | 0+5 | 0 | 0 | 0 | 0 | 0 | 0+1 | 0 |
| 77 | MF | (Croatia) CRO | Marcelo Brozović | 40 | 3 | 19+9 | 3 | 2+1 | 0 | 0 | 0 | 5+4 | 0 |
Forwards
| 9 | FW | (Bosnia and Herzegovina) BIH | Edin Džeko | 52 | 14 | 18+15 | 9 | 3+2 | 0 | 1 | 1 | 11+2 | 4 |
| 10 | FW | (Argentina) ARG | Lautaro Martínez | 57 | 28 | 27+11 | 21 | 5 | 3 | 1 | 1 | 12+1 | 3 |
| 11 | FW | (Argentina) ARG | Joaquín Correa | 41 | 4 | 12+14 | 3 | 1+4 | 0 | 0+1 | 0 | 3+6 | 1 |
| 90 | FW | (Belgium) BEL | Romelu Lukaku | 37 | 14 | 19+6 | 10 | 1+3 | 1 | 0 | 0 | 0+8 | 3 |
Players transferred out during the season

Source: Competitions

=== Goalscorers ===
| Rank | No. | Pos. | Player | Serie A | Coppa Italia | Supercoppa Italiana | Champions League | Total |
|---|---|---|---|---|---|---|---|---|
| 1 | 10 | FW | (Argentina) Lautaro Martínez | 21 | 3 | 1 | 3 | 28 |
| 2 | 9 | FW | (Bosnia and Herzegovina) Edin Džeko | 9 | 0 | 1 | 4 | 14 |
| 2 | 90 | FW | (Belgium) Romelu Lukaku | 10 | 1 | 0 | 3 | 14 |
| 4 | 23 | MF | (Italy) Nicolò Barella | 6 | 0 | 0 | 3 | 9 |
| 5 | 32 | DF | (Italy) Federico Dimarco | 4 | 1 | 1 | 0 | 6 |
| 6 | 22 | MF | (Armenia) Henrikh Mkhitaryan | 3 | 0 | 0 | 2 | 5 |
| 7 | 8 | DF | (Germany) Robin Gosens | 3 | 0 | 0 | 1 | 4 |
| 7 | 11 | FW | (Argentina) Joaquín Correa | 3 | 0 | 0 | 1 | 4 |
| 7 | 20 | MF | (Turkey) Hakan Çalhanoğlu | 3 | 0 | 0 | 1 | 4 |
| 10 | 77 | MF | (Croatia) Marcelo Brozović | 3 | 0 | 0 | 0 | 3 |
| 11 | 2 | DF | (Netherlands) Denzel Dumfries | 1 | 0 | 0 | 1 | 2 |
| 11 | 36 | DF | (Italy) Matteo Darmian | 1 | 1 | 0 | 0 | 2 |
| 13 | 6 | DF | (Netherlands) Stefan de Vrij | 1 | 0 | 0 | 0 | 1 |
| 13 | 15 | DF | (Italy) Francesco Acerbi | 0 | 1 | 0 | 0 | 1 |
| Own goals | | | | 3 | 0 | 0 | 0 | 3 |
| Totals | | | | 71 | 7 | 3 | 19 | 100 |

=== Assists ===
| Rank | No. | Pos. | Player | Serie A | Coppa Italia | Supercoppa Italiana | Champions League | Total |
|---|---|---|---|---|---|---|---|---|
| 1 | 10 | FW | (Argentina) Lautaro Martínez | 6 | 1 | 0 | 3 | 10 |
| 2 | 23 | MF | (Italy) Nicolò Barella | 6 | 2 | 1 | 0 | 9 |
| 3 | 20 | MF | (Turkey) Hakan Çalhanoğlu | 6 | 0 | 0 | 2 | 8 |
| 3 | 32 | DF | (Italy) Federico Dimarco | 3 | 0 | 0 | 5 | 8 |
| 5 | 90 | FW | (Belgium) Romelu Lukaku | 6 | 0 | 0 | 1 | 7 |
| 6 | 77 | MF | (Croatia) Marcelo Brozović | 5 | 1 | 0 | 0 | 6 |
| 6 | 95 | DF | (Italy) Alessandro Bastoni | 2 | 0 | 1 | 3 | 6 |
| 8 | 2 | DF | (Netherlands) Denzel Dumfries | 4 | 0 | 0 | 0 | 4 |
| 8 | 9 | FW | (Bosnia and Herzegovina) Edin Džeko | 3 | 0 | 0 | 1 | 4 |
| 10 | 11 | FW | (Argentina) Joaquín Correa | 1 | 0 | 0 | 2 | 3 |
| 11 | 15 | DF | (Italy) Francesco Acerbi | 2 | 0 | 0 | 0 | 2 |
| 11 | 22 | MF | (Armenia) Henrikh Mkhitaryan | 2 | 0 | 0 | 0 | 2 |
| 11 | 33 | DF | (Italy) Danilo D'Ambrosio | 2 | 0 | 0 | 0 | 2 |
| 11 | 36 | DF | (Italy) Matteo Darmian | 2 | 0 | 0 | 0 | 2 |
| 15 | 37 | DF | (Slovakia) Milan Škriniar | 0 | 0 | 1 | 0 | 1 |
| Totals | | | | 50 | 4 | 3 | 17 | 74 |

=== Clean sheets ===
| Rank | No. | Pos. | Player | Serie A | Coppa Italia | Supercoppa Italiana | Champions League | Total |
|---|---|---|---|---|---|---|---|---|
| 1 | 24 | GK | (Cameroon) André Onana | 8 | 2 | 1 | 8 | 19 |
| 2 | 1 | GK | (Slovenia) Samir Handanović | 4 | 0 | 0 | 0 | 4 |
| 3 | N/A | GK | Shared (Note: On 3 June 2023, both Samir Handanović and Alex Cordaz contributed to keep a clean sheet in the match against Torino, as the latter came on as a substitute in the 65th minute.) | 1 | 0 | 0 | 0 | 1 |
| Totals | | | | 13 | 2 | 1 | 8 | 24 |

=== Disciplinary record ===
| No. | Pos. | Player | Serie A | | | Coppa Italia | | | Supercoppa Italiana | | | Champions League | | | Total | | |
| No. | Pos. | Player | Yellow card | (yellow card) (yellow-red card) | Red card | Yellow card | (yellow card) (yellow-red card) | Red card | Yellow card | (yellow card) (yellow-red card) | Red card | Yellow card | (yellow card) (yellow-red card) | Red card | Yellow card | (yellow card) (yellow-red card) | Red card |
|---|---|---|---|---|---|---|---|---|---|---|---|---|---|---|---|---|---|
| 1 | GK | (Slovenia) Samir Handanović | 0 | 0 | 0 | 0 | 0 | 1 | 0 | 0 | 0 | 0 | 0 | 0 | 0 | 0 | 1 |
| 2 | DF | (Netherlands) Denzel Dumfries | 4 | 0 | 0 | 0 | 0 | 0 | 0 | 0 | 0 | 0 | 0 | 0 | 4 | 0 | 0 |
| 5 | MF | (Italy) Roberto Gagliardini | 3 | 1 | 0 | 0 | 0 | 0 | 0 | 0 | 0 | 1 | 0 | 0 | 4 | 1 | 0 |
| 6 | DF | (Netherlands) Stefan de Vrij | 4 | 0 | 0 | 0 | 0 | 0 | 0 | 0 | 0 | 1 | 0 | 0 | 5 | 0 | 0 |
| 8 | DF | (Germany) Robin Gosens | 2 | 0 | 0 | 1 | 0 | 0 | 0 | 0 | 0 | 1 | 0 | 0 | 4 | 0 | 0 |
| 9 | FW | (Bosnia and Herzegovina) Edin Džeko | 3 | 0 | 0 | 0 | 0 | 0 | 0 | 0 | 0 | 2 | 0 | 0 | 5 | 0 | 0 |
| 10 | FW | (Argentina) Lautaro Martínez | 3 | 0 | 0 | 1 | 0 | 0 | 1 | 0 | 0 | 2 | 0 | 0 | 7 | 0 | 0 |
| 11 | FW | (Argentina) Joaquín Correa | 1 | 0 | 0 | 1 | 0 | 0 | 0 | 0 | 0 | 0 | 0 | 0 | 2 | 0 | 0 |
| 14 | MF | (Albania) Kristjan Asllani | 2 | 0 | 0 | 0 | 0 | 0 | 0 | 0 | 0 | 0 | 0 | 0 | 2 | 0 | 0 |
| 15 | DF | (Italy) Francesco Acerbi | 4 | 0 | 0 | 0 | 0 | 0 | 0 | 0 | 0 | 1 | 0 | 0 | 5 | 0 | 0 |
| 20 | MF | (Turkey) Hakan Çalhanoğlu | 3 | 0 | 0 | 0 | 0 | 0 | 1 | 0 | 0 | 1 | 0 | 0 | 5 | 0 | 0 |
| 22 | MF | (Armenia) Henrikh Mkhitaryan | 4 | 0 | 0 | 1 | 0 | 0 | 0 | 0 | 0 | 2 | 0 | 0 | 7 | 0 | 0 |
| 23 | MF | (Italy) Nicolò Barella | 6 | 0 | 0 | 0 | 0 | 0 | 1 | 0 | 0 | 3 | 0 | 0 | 10 | 0 | 0 |
| 24 | GK | (Cameroon) André Onana | 1 | 0 | 0 | 1 | 0 | 0 | 0 | 0 | 0 | 1 | 0 | 0 | 3 | 0 | 0 |
| 32 | DF | (Italy) Federico Dimarco | 0 | 0 | 0 | 1 | 0 | 0 | 0 | 0 | 0 | 2 | 0 | 0 | 3 | 0 | 0 |
| 33 | DF | (Italy) Danilo D'Ambrosio | 3 | 0 | 1 | 0 | 0 | 0 | 0 | 0 | 0 | 0 | 0 | 0 | 3 | 0 | 1 |
| 36 | DF | (Italy) Matteo Darmian | 3 | 0 | 0 | 0 | 0 | 0 | 0 | 0 | 0 | 1 | 0 | 0 | 4 | 0 | 0 |
| 37 | DF | (Slovakia) Milan Škriniar | 3 | 1 | 0 | 0 | 0 | 0 | 0 | 0 | 0 | 0 | 0 | 0 | 3 | 1 | 0 |
| 45 | MF | (Argentina) Valentín Carboni | 0 | 0 | 0 | 0 | 0 | 0 | 0 | 0 | 0 | 1 | 0 | 0 | 1 | 0 | 0 |
| 77 | MF | (Croatia) Marcelo Brozović | 9 | 0 | 0 | 1 | 0 | 0 | 0 | 0 | 0 | 1 | 0 | 0 | 11 | 0 | 0 |
| 90 | FW | (Belgium) Romelu Lukaku | 1 | 0 | 0 | 0 | 1 | 0 | 0 | 0 | 0 | 1 | 0 | 0 | 2 | 1 | 0 |
| 95 | DF | (Italy) Alessandro Bastoni | 3 | 0 | 0 | 1 | 0 | 0 | 0 | 0 | 0 | 2 | 0 | 0 | 6 | 0 | 0 |
| Totals | | | 62 | 2 | 1 | 8 | 1 | 1 | 3 | 0 | 0 | 23 | 0 | 0 | 96 | 3 | 2 |
