= Nicolás Fonseca =

Footballer (born 1998)

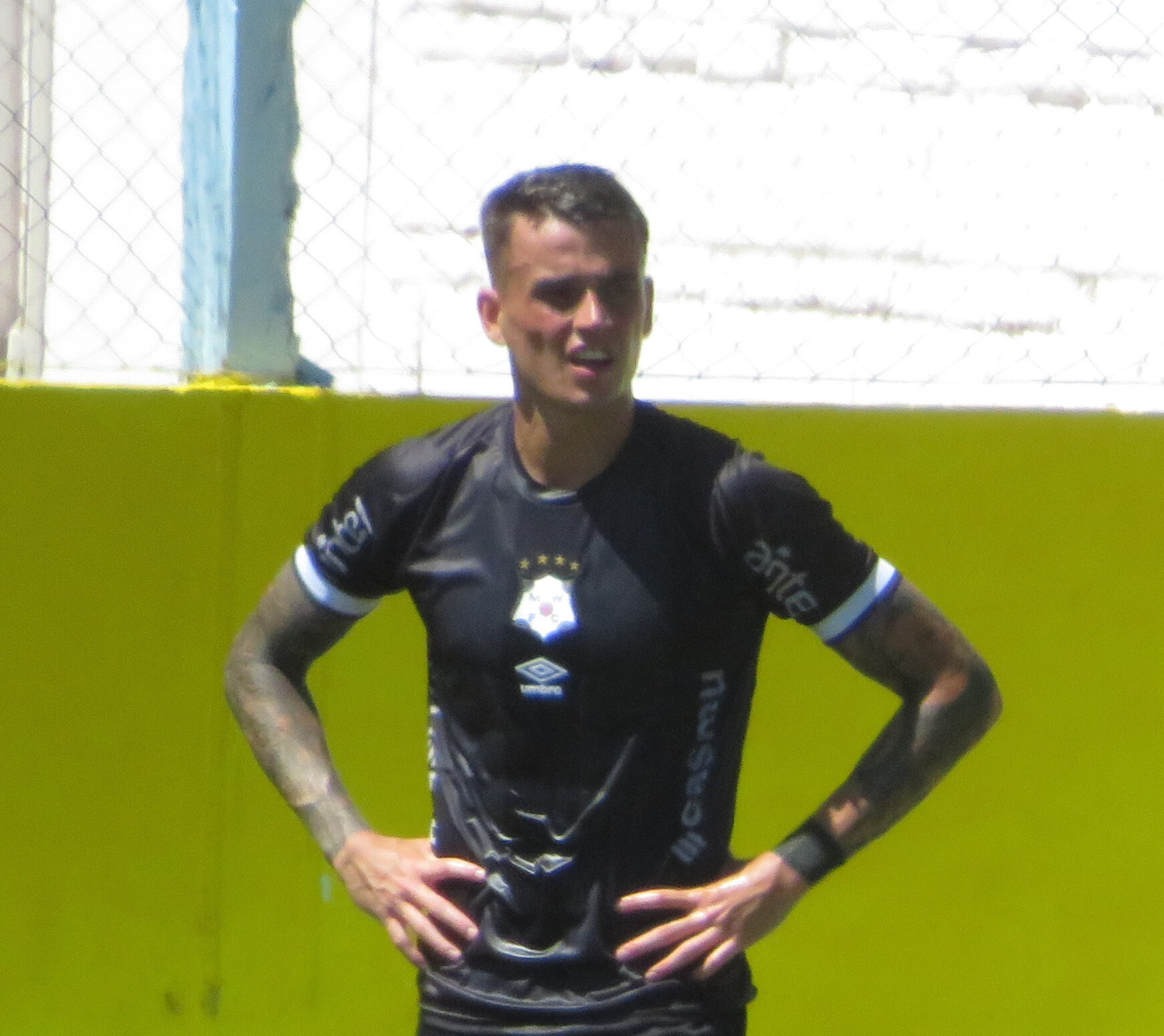
- Fonseca with Montevideo Wanderers in 2023

Personal information
- Date of birth: 19 October 1998 (age 28)
- Place of birth: Naples, Italy
- Height: 1.81 m (5 ft 11 in)
- Position: Midfielder

Team information
- Current team: Coritiba (on loan from León)
- Number: 5

Youth career
- 2016–2018: Novara

Senior career*
| Years | Team | Apps | (Gls) |
| 2018–2020 | Novara | 16 | (0) |
| 2021–2022 | River Plate Montevideo | 2 | (0) |
| 2022–2023 | Montevideo Wanderers | 33 | (1) |
| 2023–2025 | River Plate | 20 | (1) |
| 2023 | → Montevideo Wanderers (loan) | 13 | (0) |
| 2025– | León | 33 | (0) |
| 2025-2026 | → Oviedo (loan) | 19 | (0) |
| 2026– | → Coritiba (loan) | 0 | (0) |

International career^{‡}
| 2024– | Uruguay | 7 | (0) |
- * Club domestic league appearances and goals as of 27 May 2026 ‡ National team caps and goals as of 10 September 2026

Nicolás Fonseca (born 19 October 1998) is a professional footballer who plays as a midfielder for Brasileirão and Campeonato Paranaense club Coritiba, on loan from Liga MX club León, and for the Uruguay national team.

== Club career ==
Before the second half of 2021–22, Fonseca signed for Uruguayan side River Plate (Montevideo). In the first week of 2024, he signed for River Plate of Argentina.

In January 2025, Fonseca moved to Mexico, joining Liga MX side Club León. On 26 December 2025, he was sent on loan to Spanish club Real Oviedo, who sat bottom of the La Liga table, until the end of the season. On September 10, 2026, the midfielder joined Coritiba of the Brasileirão on loan with an option to buy; he signed a contract running until August 2027.

== International career ==
Fonseca received his first call-up to the Uruguay national team in March 2024 for friendlies against Basque Country and Ivory Coast. He made his debut on 23 March in a 1–1 draw against Basque Country.

== Personal life ==
Nicolás is the son of former Uruguay international Daniel Fonseca. His brother Matías is also a footballer.

== Career statistics ==
=== International ===
As of match played 13 October 2025

Appearances and goals by national team and year
| National team | Year | Apps | Goals |
|---|---|---|---|
| Uruguay | 2024 | 4 (Note: Includes a Non-FIFA friendly played against the Basque Country, which is counted as an official match by the Uruguayan Football Association.) | 0 |
| Uruguay | 2025 | 3 | 0 |
| Uruguay | 2026 | 0 | 0 |
| Total | | 7 | 0 |
