= Federico Dimarco =

Italian footballer (born 1997)

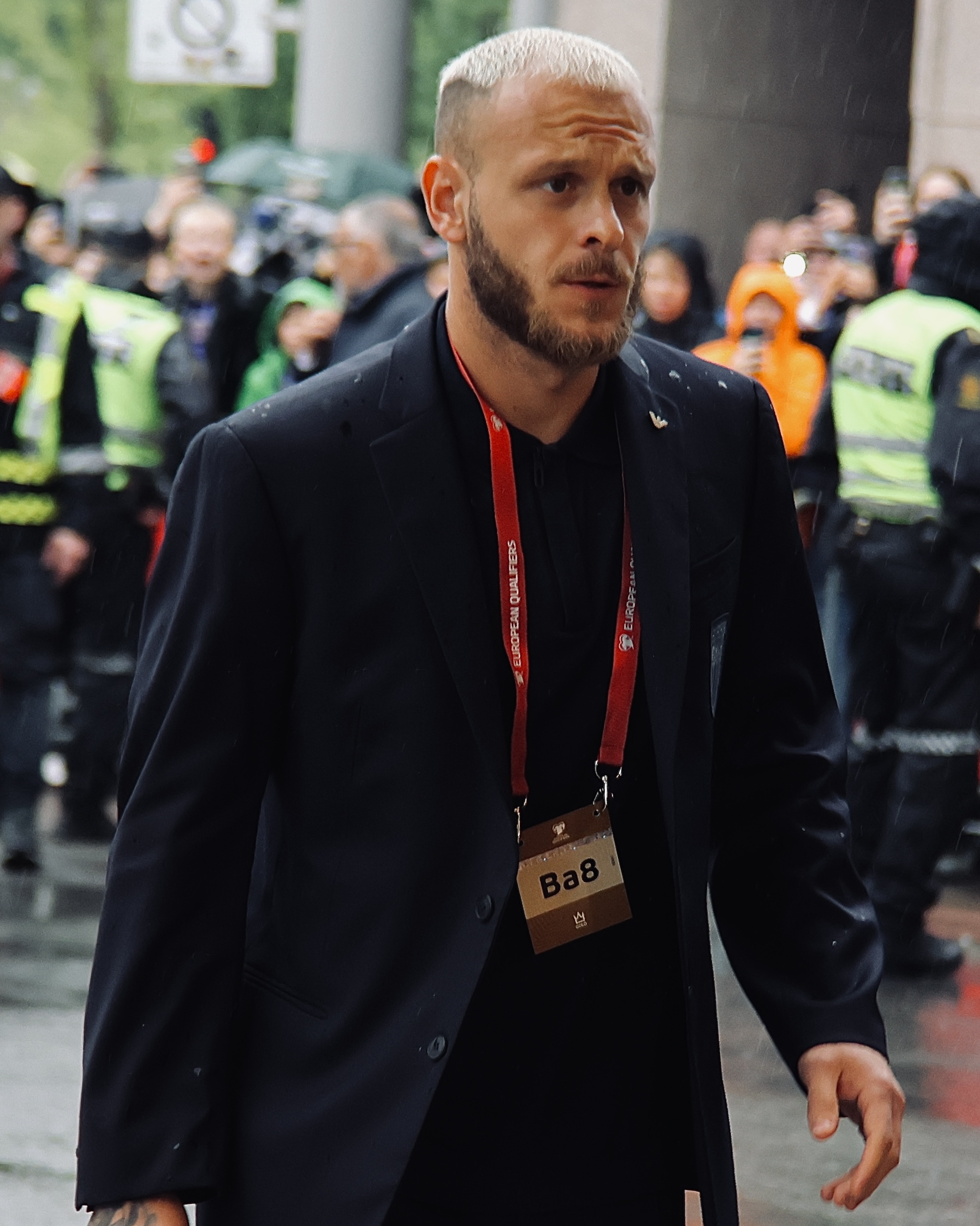
- Dimarco in June 2025

Personal information
- Full name: Federico Dimarco
- Date of birth: 10 November 1997 (age 29)
- Place of birth: Milan, Italy
- Height: 1.75 m (5 ft 9 in)
- Position: Left wing-back

Team information
- Current team: Inter Milan
- Number: 32

Youth career
- 2004–2014: Inter Milan

Senior career*
| Years | Team | Apps | (Gls) |
| 2014–2017 | Inter Milan | 1 | (0) |
| 2016 | → Ascoli (loan) | 15 | (0) |
| 2016–2017 | → Empoli (loan) | 12 | (0) |
| 2017–2018 | Sion | 9 | (0) |
| 2018– | Inter Milan | 178 | (22) |
| 2018–2019 | → Parma (loan) | 13 | (1) |
| 2020–2021 | → Hellas Verona (loan) | 48 | (5) |

International career^{‡}
| 2012 | Italy U15 | 6 | (1) |
| 2012–2013 | Italy U16 | 5 | (0) |
| 2013–2014 | Italy U17 | 19 | (1) |
| 2014–2015 | Italy U18 | 9 | (1) |
| 2015–2016 | Italy U19 | 18 | (6) |
| 2016–2017 | Italy U20 | 11 | (2) |
| 2017–2019 | Italy U21 | 12 | (1) |
| 2022– | Italy | 40 | (3) |
Medal record
Men's Football
Representing Italy
UEFA Nations League
| Third place | 2023 Netherlands |
- * Club domestic league appearances and goals as of 22 November 2026 ‡ National team caps and goals as of 15 November 2026

Federico Dimarco (born 10 November 1997) is an Italian professional footballer who plays as a left wing-back for Serie A club Inter Milan and the Italy national team. He is known for his pace, crossing, and threatening goal-scoring presence from outside the box. Dimarco is also considered to be one of the best left backs in the world.

== Club career ==
=== Inter Milan ===
A product of Inter Milan's youth academy, Dimarco debuted for the club on 11 December 2014, at age 17, entering as a substitute for Danilo D'Ambrosio in the 84th minute of a goalless draw away to Qarabağ in the group stage of the UEFA Europa League, with his team having already advanced. He received his first Serie A call-up on 1 February 2015, remaining an unused substitute in a 1–3 defeat away to Sassuolo. Dimarco made his Serie A debut on 31 May 2015, replacing Rodrigo Palacio in the 89th minute of a 4–3 win over Empoli in the season finale.

==== Loan to Ascoli ====
In January 2016, Dimarco was sent on loan to Serie B club Ascoli with a six-month deal. On 6 February, he made his debut for the club in a 0–0 home draw against Latina; he was replaced by Dario Del Fabro in the 81st minute. Dimarco finished his six-month tenure with Ascoli with fifteen appearances and four assists.

==== Loan to Empoli ====
On 1 July 2016, Dimarco was sent on a season-long loan to fellow Serie A club Empoli. On 28 August 2016, he made his debut for the club in a 2–0 away defeat against Udinese, where he was replaced by Marco Zambelli in the 69th minute. Dimarco finished his season-long loan to Empoli with thirteen appearances, as the club was relegated to Serie B.

=== Sion ===
On 30 June 2017, Dimarco was sold to Swiss club Sion for a fee of €3.91 million. On 23 July 2017, he made his debut for the club in a 1–0 Swiss Super League away win over Thun. He was replaced by Quentin Maceiras in the 41st minute for a fracture of the foot.

=== Return to Inter Milan ===
On 5 July 2018, Inter exercised their buy-back clause to bring back Dimarco for €7 million. On 7 August 2018, Dimarco was loaned to Parma with an option to buy. He made his debut for Parma on 12 August in the third round of Coppa Italia, a 1–0 loss to Pisa. On 16 September, he scored his first Serie A goal in a 1–0 win against his parent club Inter at the San Siro. On 31 January 2020, Dimarco moved to Hellas Verona on loan until the end of the season with an option for a permanent move. On 9 September 2020, his loan was extended for another season. On 23 December 2021, he extended his Inter contract to June 2026.

On 10 June 2023, Dimarco played in the Champions League final against Manchester City, in which he had a chance to equalize, three minutes after the opponent scored the only goal in the 68th minute, through a header that hit the crossbar, he then tried to capitalize on the rebound as well, but his shot was blocked by teammate Romelu Lukaku.

On 12 November 2023, in a Serie A match at home to Frosinone, Dimarco scored from 56.08 metres (184.0 ft), near the half-way line; the game ended in a 2–0 victory for Inter. A month later, on 30 December, he extended his contract with Inter Milan until 2027.

On 26 April 2026, Dimarco provided an assist in a 2–2 away draw against Torino, becoming the player with the most assists in a single Serie A season, reaching 17 assists, surpassing the previous record held by Papu Gómez in the 2019–20 season.

== International career ==
=== Youth ===
In 2013, Dimarco was a member of the Italy under-17 side that finished runners-up at the UEFA European Under-17 Championship in Slovakia and was eliminated in the second round of the FIFA U-17 World Cup. With the Italy under-19, he took part at the 2016 UEFA European Under-19 Championship, where Italy reached the final. Dimarco scored four goals in the tournament, including three penalties and one free kick.

On 22 March 2018, Dimarco debuted with the Italy under-21 in a 1–1 friendly draw against Norway, entering as a substitute for Giuseppe Pezzella (1–1). He scored his first under-21 goal on 11 September in a 3–1 friendly victory against Albania.

=== Senior ===
Dimarco received his first call-up to the Italian senior squad for the 2021 UEFA Nations League Finals. On 4 June 2022, he debuted in a 2022–23 UEFA Nations League match against Germany which ended in a 1–1 draw. He scored his first goal on 26 September in a 2–0 away victory against Hungary in the 2022–23 UEFA Nations League, allowing Italy to qualify for the 2023 UEFA Nations League Finals.

The goal was also Italy's 1,500th goal. He scored his second goal for Italy on 18 June 2023, in a 3–2 win against the Netherlands in the bronze medal match of the tournament.

== Style of play ==
Dimarco is a left-footed defender who usually plays as a left-back, although he is also capable of playing on the right. He is known in particular for his pace, tireless running, eye for goal, and his powerful and accurate shot from outside the penalty area, as well as his ability to interpret the game; he is also a threat from set pieces. His qualities enable him to aid his team both defensively and offensively. In spite of his small stature and slender physique, he possesses significant strength, as well as good technical skills.

Considered by journalist Emmet Gates to be one of the best full-backs in Serie A, Dimarco's pace and technical ability allow him to excel as a left-sided wing-back in a 3–5–2 formation, where he is able to overlap and get forward with his attacking runs, both on and off the ball, to create chances for his team with his crossing. Dimarco's defensive ability has been cited as a weakness in his game by journalist Kyle Bonn of The Sporting News. In 2024, ESPN placed him 10th in their list of the 100 best defenders in men's soccer.

== Personal life ==
Dimarco's younger brother Christian is also a professional footballer.

== Career statistics ==
=== Club ===
As of match played 22 November 2026

Appearances and goals by club, season and competition
| Club | Season | League | | | National cup (Note: Includes Coppa Italia) | | Europe | | Other | | Total | |
| Club | Season | Division | Apps | Goals | Apps | Goals | Apps | Goals | Apps | Goals | Apps | Goals |
|---|---|---|---|---|---|---|---|---|---|---|---|---|
| Inter Milan | 2014–15 | Serie A | 1 | 0 | 0 | 0 | 1 (Note: Appearance in UEFA Europa League) | 0 | — | | 2 | 0 |
| Ascoli (loan) | 2015–16 | Serie B | 12 | 0 | 0 | 0 | — | | — | | 12 | 0 |
| Empoli (loan) | 2016–17 | Serie A | 15 | 0 | 1 | 0 | — | | — | | 16 | 0 |
| Sion | 2017–18 | Swiss Super League | 9 | 0 | 0 | 0 | 0 | 0 | — | | 9 | 0 |
| Parma (loan) | 2018–19 | Serie A | 13 | 1 | 1 | 0 | — | | — | | 14 | 1 |
| Inter Milan | 2019–20 | Serie A | 3 | 0 | 1 | 0 | 0 | 0 | — | | 4 | 0 |
| Inter Milan | 2021–22 | Serie A | 32 | 2 | 2 | 0 | 7 (Note: Appearances in UEFA Champions League) | 0 | 1 (Note: Appearance(s) in Supercoppa Italiana) | 0 | 42 | 2 |
| Inter Milan | 2022–23 | Serie A | 33 | 4 | 5 | 1 | 11 | 0 | 1 | 1 | 50 | 6 |
| Inter Milan | 2023–24 | Serie A | 30 | 5 | 1 | 0 | 7 | 1 | 2 | 0 | 40 | 6 |
| Inter Milan | 2024–25 | Serie A | 33 | 4 | 2 | 0 | 10 | 0 | 6 (Note: Two appearances in Supercoppa Italiana, four appearances in FIFA Club World Cup) | 0 | 51 | 4 |
| Inter Milan | 2025–26 | Serie A | 35 | 7 | 2 | 0 | 9 | 1 | 1 | 0 | 47 | 8 |
| Inter Milan | 2026–27 | Serie A | 12 | 0 | 0 | 0 | 3 | 0 | 0 | 0 | 15 | 0 |
| Inter Milan | Total | | 178 | 22 | 13 | 1 | 47 | 2 | 11 | 1 | 249 | 26 |
| Hellas Verona (loan) | 2019–20 | Serie A | 13 | 0 | — | | — | | — | | 13 | 0 |
| Hellas Verona (loan) | 2020–21 | Serie A | 35 | 5 | 2 | 0 | — | | — | | 37 | 5 |
| Hellas Verona (loan) | Total | | 48 | 5 | 2 | 0 | — | | — | | 50 | 5 |
| Career total | | | 276 | 27 | 17 | 1 | 48 | 2 | 11 | 1 | 352 | 32 |

=== International ===
As of match played 15 November 2026

Appearances and goals by national team and year
| National team | Year | Apps | Goals |
|---|---|---|---|
| Italy | 2022 | 8 | 1 |
| Italy | 2023 | 8 | 1 |
| Italy | 2024 | 12 | 1 |
| Italy | 2025 | 8 | 0 |
| Italy | 2026 | 4 | 0 |
| Total | | 40 | 3 |

Italy score listed first, score column indicates score after each Dimarco goal.

List of international goals scored by Federico Dimarco
| No. | Date | Venue | Cap | Opponent | Score | Result | Competition |
|---|---|---|---|---|---|---|---|
| 1 | 26 September 2022 | Puskás Aréna, Budapest, Hungary | 6 | Hungary | 2–0 | 2–0 | 2022–23 UEFA Nations League A |
| 2 | 18 June 2023 | De Grolsch Veste, Enschede, Netherlands | 10 | Netherlands | 1–0 | 3–2 | 2023 UEFA Nations League Finals |
| 3 | 6 September 2024 | Parc des Princes, Paris, France | 23 | France | 1–1 | 3–1 | 2024–25 UEFA Nations League A |

== Honours ==
Inter Milan

- Serie A: 2023–24, 2025–26
- Coppa Italia: 2021–22, 2022–23, 2025–26
- Supercoppa Italiana: 2021, 2022, 2023
- UEFA Champions League runner-up: 2022–23, 2024–25

Italy U17

- UEFA European Under-17 Championship runner-up: 2013

Italy U19

- UEFA European Under-19 Championship runner-up: 2016

Italy U20

- FIFA U-20 World Cup bronze medal: 2017

Italy

- UEFA Nations League third place: 2020–21, 2022–23

Individual

- UEFA Champions League Team of the Season: 2022–23
- Serie A Goal of the Month: November 2023
- EA Sports FC Serie A Team of the Season: 2023–24, 2024–25, 2025–26
- Serie A Team of the Year: 2023–24, 2024–25, 2025–26
- Serie A Player of the Month: January 2026
- Serie A Most Valuable Player: 2025–26
- Serie A Footballer of the Year: 2025–26
