= Franco Vezzoni =

Argentine footballer

Personal information
- Full name: Franco Orlando Vezzoni
- Date of birth: 12 November 2001 (age 24)
- Place of birth: Cosquín, Argentina
- Height: 1.84 m (6 ft 0 in)
- Position: Midfielder

Team information
- Current team: Casertana
- Number: 21

Youth career
- CD Atalaya
- 2018–2020: Inter Milan

Senior career*
Years	Team	Apps	(Gls)
2020–2023	Inter Milan	0	(0)
2021–2023	→ Pro Patria (loan)	48	(0)
2023–2025	Foggia	56	(1)
2025–2026	Vis Pesaro	25	(4)
2026–	Casertana	1	(0)
- * Club domestic league appearances and goals as of 22 August 2026

Franco Orlando Vezzoni (born 12 November 2001) is an Argentine professional footballer who plays as a midfielder for Serie C Group C club Casertana.

== Club career ==
Born in Cosquín, Córdoba, Vezzoni joined Inter Milan Youth Sector at 16. In 2020, he was promoted to first team.

On 24 July 2021, he joined to Serie C club Pro Patria on loan. He made his professional debut on 29 September 2021 against Lecco. On 20 July 2022, Vezzoni re-joined Pro Patria for another season-long loan.

On 31 August 2023, Vezzoni signed a two-year contract with Foggia.

== Career statistics ==
=== Club ===
As of 1 May 2022

Club	Season	League			Cup		Europe		Other		Total	
Club	Season	League	Apps	Goals	Apps	Goals	Apps	Goals	Apps	Goals	Apps	Goals
Pro Patria (loan)	2021–22	Serie C	19	0	0	0	—		1 (Note: All appearance(s) in Serie C play-off.)	0	20	0
Career total			19	0	0	0	—		1	0	20	0
