= Matias Fonseca (footballer, born 2001) =

Italian footballer (born 2001)

Personal information
- Full name: Matias Fonseca
- Date of birth: 12 March 2001 (age 25)
- Place of birth: Naples, Italy
- Height: 1.81 m (5 ft 11 in)
- Position: Forward

Team information
- Current team: Instituto
- Number: 11

Youth career
- Como
- 2016–2021: Inter Milan

Senior career*
Years	Team	Apps	(Gls)
2021–2023	Inter Milan	0	(0)
2021–2022	→ Pergolettese (loan)	21	(1)
2022–2023	→ Imolese (loan)	15	(2)
2023–2025	Montevideo Wanderers	50	(8)
2025	Racing Montevideo	5	(0)
2025–	Instituto	25	(1)

International career^{‡}
2020	Italy U19	1	(0)
2024	Uruguay U23	3	(0)
2024	Uruguay local	2	(0)
- * Club domestic league appearances and goals as of 18:08, 10 May 2026 (UTC) ‡ National team caps and goals as of 1 September 2024

Matias Fonseca (born 12 March 2001) is a professional footballer who plays as a forward for Argentine Primera División side Instituto. Born in Italy, he represented them at youth international level before switching his allegiance to Uruguay.

== Club career ==
Born in Naples, Fonseca was formed as a player on Como and Inter Milan youth system.

After his promotion to first team on 2021, Fonseca was loaned to Serie C club Pergolettese. He made his professional debut on 11 September 2021 against Pro Sesto.

On 31 January 2023, Fonseca signed with Montevideo Wanderers for the 2023 season.

== International career ==
Fonseca made his debut for Italy U19 on 15 January 2020 against Spain U19.

In January 2024, Fonseca was named in Uruguay's squad for the 2024 CONMEBOL Pre-Olympic Tournament. In May 2024, he was named in the first ever Uruguay local national team squad. He made his Uruguay local team debut on 31 May 2024 in a goalless draw against Costa Rica.

== Personal life ==
Matias is son of former Uruguayan international Daniel Fonseca. His brother Nicolás is also a footballer.

== Career statistics ==
=== Club ===
As of 16 April 2022

Appearances and goals by club, season and competition
Club	Season	League			Cup		Europe		Other		Total	
Club	Season	League	Apps	Goals	Apps	Goals	Apps	Goals	Apps	Goals	Apps	Goals
Pergolettese (loan)	2021–22	Serie C	20	1	0	0	—		0	0	20	1
Career total			20	1	0	0	—		0	0	20	1
