= Riccardo Boscolo Chio =

Italian footballer

Personal information
- Date of birth: 6 July 2002 (age 24)
- Place of birth: Chioggia, Italy
- Height: 1.79 m (5 ft 10 in)
- Position: Midfielder

Team information
- Current team: Pro Sesto
- Number: 25

Youth career
- Venezia
- Inter Milan

Senior career*
Years	Team	Apps	(Gls)
2021–2022	Inter Milan	0	(0)
2021–2022	→ Imolese (loan)	20	(1)
2022–	Pro Sesto	10	(0)

International career^{‡}
2020	Italy U17	2	(0)
2018–2019	Italy U18	12	(0)
- * Club domestic league appearances and goals as of 3 May 2023 ‡ National team caps and goals as of 12 February 2020

Riccardo Boscolo Chio (born 6 July 2002) is an Italian professional footballer who plays as a midfielder for Serie C club Pro Sesto.

== Club career ==
Born in Chioggia, Boscolo Chio started his career in Venezia F.C. and Inter Milan youth sector.

On 6 August 2021, he was loaned to Serie C club Imolese. Riccardo made his professional debut on 19 September 2021 against Siena.

On 20 July 2022, he joined Pro Sesto on a permanent deal.

== International career ==
Boscolo Chio was a youth international for Italy U17 and Italy U18. He played four 2019 FIFA U-17 World Cup matches for Italy.

== Career statistics ==
=== Club ===
As of 15 May 2022

Club	Season	League			Cup		Europe		Other		Total	
Club	Season	League	Apps	Goals	Apps	Goals	Apps	Goals	Apps	Goals	Apps	Goals
Imolese (loan)	2021–22	Serie C	20	1	1	0	—		1 (Note: All appearance(s) in Serie C play-out.)	1	22	2
Career total			20	1	1	0	—		1	1	22	2
