= Niccolò Squizzato =

Italian footballer (born 2002)

Personal information
- Date of birth: 7 January 2002 (age 24)
- Place of birth: Gallarate, Italy
- Height: 1.86 m (6 ft 1 in)
- Position: Midfielder

Team information
- Current team: Virtus Entella
- Number: 5

Youth career
- Inter Milan

Senior career*
Years	Team	Apps	(Gls)
2021–2023	Inter Milan	0	(0)
2021–2022	→ Juve Stabia (loan)	12	(0)
2022–2023	→ Renate (loan)	26	(1)
2023–2026	Pescara	78	(1)
2026–	Virtus Entella	17	(0)

International career^{‡}
2017	Italy U15	4	(1)
2017–2018	Italy U16	6	(1)
2019	Italy U17	5	(0)
2019	Italy U18	3	(0)
- * Club domestic league appearances and goals as of 13 May 2026 ‡ National team caps and goals as of 7 September 2019

Niccolò Squizzato (born 7 January 2002) is an Italian professional footballer who plays as a midfielder for Serie B club Virtus Entella.

== Club career ==
On 24 August 2021, Squizzato was loaned to Serie C club Juve Stabia.

On 19 July 2022, Squizzato joined Renate on loan.

On 18 July 2023, Squizzato joined Pescara on a permanent transfer.

On 6 January 2026, Squizzato moved to Virtus Entella.

== Career statistics ==
=== Club ===
As of 11 May 2023

Club	Season	League			Cup		Europe		Other		Total	
Club	Season	League	Apps	Goals	Apps	Goals	Apps	Goals	Apps	Goals	Apps	Goals
Juve Stabia (loan)	2021–22	Serie C	12	0	0	0	—		—		12	0
Renate (loan)	2022–23	Serie C	26	1	3	1	—		1 (Note: All appearance(s) in Serie C play-off.)	0	30	2
Career total			38	1	3	1	—		1	0	42	2
