= Christian Dimarco =

Italian footballer (born 2002)

Personal information
- Date of birth: 23 July 2002 (age 24)
- Place of birth: Milan, Italy
- Height: 1.79 m (5 ft 10 in)
- Position: Defender

Team information
- Current team: Pro Patria

Youth career
- Inter Milan

Senior career*
Years	Team	Apps	(Gls)
2021–2022	Inter Milan	0	(0)
2021–2022	→ Fiorenzuola (loan)	24	(0)
2022–2024	Feralpisalò	8	(0)
2023	→ Fiorenzuola (loan)	11	(0)
2023–2024	→ Gubbio (loan)	23	(0)
2024–2025	Alcione	35	(0)
2025–	Pro Patria	22	(0)
2026	→ Foggia (loan)	13	(0)

International career^{‡}
2017	Italy U15	9	(0)
2017–2018	Italy U16	13	(1)
2018	Italy U17	7	(0)
2019–2020	Italy U18	4	(0)
- * Club domestic league appearances and goals as of 1 May 2026 ‡ National team caps and goals as of 12 February 2020

Christian Dimarco (born 23 July 2002) is an Italian professional footballer who plays as a defender for Serie D club Pro Patria.

== Club career ==
Dimarco started his career in Inter Milan youth setup.

On 31 July 2021, Dimarco was loaned to Serie C club Fiorenzuola.

On 8 July 2022, Dimarco joined Feralpisalò on a permanent deal. On 31 January 2023, he returned to Fiorenzuola on loan.

== Personal life ==
He is the brother of Inter Milan and Italy national football team player Federico Dimarco.

== Career statistics ==
=== Club ===
As of 16 April 2022

Club	Season	League			Cup		Europe		Other		Total	
Club	Season	League	Apps	Goals	Apps	Goals	Apps	Goals	Apps	Goals	Apps	Goals
Fiorenzuola (loan)	2021–22	Serie C	24	0	1	0	—		—		25	0
Career total			24	0	1	0	—		—		25	0
