= Fabrizio Bagheria =

Italian footballer

Personal information
- Date of birth: 5 April 2001 (age 25)
- Place of birth: Milan, Italy
- Height: 1.85 m (6 ft 1 in)
- Position: Goalkeeper

Team information
- Current team: Vicenza
- Number: 1

Youth career
- –2018: Inter Milan

Senior career*
Years	Team	Apps	(Gls)
2018–2023	Inter Milan	0	(0)
2018–2019	→ Parma (loan)	0	(0)
2019–2020	→ Prato (loan)	24	(0)
2020–2021	→ Renate (loan)	1	(0)
2021–2022	→ Pro Sesto (loan)	2	(0)
2022–2023	→ Recanatese (loan)	7	(0)
2023	→ Livorno (loan)	14	(0)
2024	Pro Sesto	3	(0)
2024–2026	Modena	1	(0)
2026–	Vicenza	0	(0)
- * Club domestic league appearances and goals as of 20 September 2026

Fabrizio Bagheria (born 5 April 2001) is an Italian professional footballer who plays as a goalkeeper for Serie B club Vicenza.

== Club career ==
On 19 July 2022, Bagheria joined Recanatese.

On 25 January 2024, Bagheria returned to Pro Sesto.

== Career statistics ==
=== Club ===
As of 7 June 2022.

Appearances and goals by club, season and competition
Club	Season	League			Cup		Other		Total	
Club	Season	Division	Apps	Goals	Apps	Goals	Apps	Goals	Apps	Goals
Inter Milan	2018–19	Serie A	0	0	0	0	0	0	0	0
Inter Milan	2019–20	Serie A	0	0	0	0	0	0	0	0
Inter Milan	2020–21	Serie A	0	0	0	0	0	0	0	0
Inter Milan	2021–22	Serie A	0	0	0	0	0	0	0	0
Inter Milan	Total		0	0	0	0	0	0	0	0
Parma (loan)	2018–19	Serie A	0	0	0	0	0	0	0	0
Prato (loan)	2019–20	Serie D	24	0	0	0	1 (Note: Appearances in the Coppa Italia Serie D)	0	25	0
Renate (loan)	2020–21	Serie C	1	0	1	0	0	0	2	0
Pro Sesto (loan)	2021–22	Serie C	2	0	0	0	0	0	2	0
Career total			27	0	1	0	1	0	29	0
