= Adama (name) =

Adama is a Hebrew given name meaning earth or soil, and a Hindu surname.

== People with the given name Adama ==
- Adama "Manadja" Fanny, musician in the Ivorian musical group Magic System
- Adama Ba (born 1993), Mauritanian footballer
- Adama Barro (born 1996), Burkinabé footballer
- Adama Barrow (born 1965), Gambian politician
- Adama Cissé (born 1967), Senegalese footballer
- Adama Koné Clofie (born 1967), Ivorian footballer
- Adama Coulibaly (born 1980), Malian footballer
- Adama Coulibaly (born 1998), Malian basketball player
- Adama Damballey (born 1957), Gambian wrestler
- Adama Diakhaby (born 1996), French footballer
- Adama Diakhaté (born 1970), Senegalese footballer
- Adama Diakhite (born 1997), Senegalese basketball player
- Adama Diakité (disambiguation)
  - Adama Diakité (born 1978), Malian footballer in 2002 African Cup of Nations
  - Adama Diakité (footballer, born 1991), French footballer
  - Adama Diakité (footballer, born 1993), Ivorian footballer in Italy
- Adama Diatta (born 1988), Senegalese wrestler
- Adama Smith Dickens (born 1992), Congolese footballer
- Adama Dieng (born 1950), African politician
- Adama Diomande (born 1990), Norwegian footballer
- Adama Dosso, Ivorian diplomat
- Adama Drabo (1948–2009), Malian filmmaker and playwright
- Adama Fall (born 1950), Senegalese sprinter
- Adama Fofana (disambiguation)
  - Adama Fofana (footballer, born 1989), Ivorian footballer, forward
  - Adama Fofana (footballer, born 1999), Ivorian footballer, defender
  - Adama Fofana (footballer, born 2001), Ivorian footballer, winger
- Adama Guira (born 1988), Burkinabé footballer
- Adama Jalloh (born 1993), British photographer
- Adama Jammeh (sprinter) (born 1993), Gambian sprinter
- Adama Jammeh (born 2000), Gambian footballer
- Adama Jarjue (born 1997), Gambian footballer
- Adama Kéïta (born 1990), Malian footballer
- Adama Koné (born 1987), Ivory Coast footballer
- Adama Kouyaté (1928–2020), Malian photographer
- Adama Lamikanra, Nigerian judge
- Adama Mbengue (born 1993), Senegalese footballer
- Adama Ndiaye, Senegalese fashion designer
- Adama Niane (footballer) (born 1993), Malian footballer
- Adama Niane (actor)
- Adama Njie (born 1978), Gambian runner
- Adama Ouédraogo (born 1987), Burkinabé swimmer
- Adama Samassékou, African politician
- Adama Sane (born 2000), Senegalese footballer
- Adama Sanogo (born 2002), Malian basketball player
- Adama Sarr (born 1991), Senegalese footballer
- Adama Sawadogo (born 1990), Burkinabé football goalkeeper
- Adama François Sene (born 1989), Senegalese footballer
- Adama Soumaoro (born 1992), French footballer
- Adama Soumaré (born 1982), French-Burundian footballer
- Adama Sulemana, Ghanaian politician
- Adama Tamba (born 1998), Gambian footballer
- Adama Tamboura (born 1985), Malian footballer
- Adama Touré (born 1991), Malian footballer
- Adama Traoré (disambiguation), multiple people

== People with the surname Adama ==
- Barack Adama, French rapper from Senegal
- Osumanu Adama (born 1980), Ghanaian boxer

== See also ==
- Adama (Battlestar Galactica) (disambiguation), for fictional characters with the surname
