= 2018–19 Inter Milan season =

Internazionale
2018–19 season
- President: Erick Thohir (until 26 October 2018); Steven Zhang (from 26 October 2018)
- Manager: Luciano Spalletti
- Stadium: San Siro
- Serie A: 4th
- Coppa Italia: Quarter-finals
- UEFA Champions League: Group stage
- UEFA Europa League: Round of 16
- Top goalscorer: League: Mauro Icardi (11); All: Mauro Icardi (17)
Home colours	Away colours	Third colours

The 2018–19 season was Football Club Internazionale Milano's 110th in existence and 103rd consecutive season in the top flight of Italian football. The side competed in Serie A, the Coppa Italia, the UEFA Champions League and the UEFA Europa League.

== Kits ==
Home	Home alt.	Home Special	Home 2019-20	Away	Away alt.	Away alt. 2	Away alt. 3	Third
Goalkeeper 1	Goalkeeper 2	Goalkeeper 3	Goalkeeper 4

== Season overview ==
On 20 May 2018, in the final round of 2017–18 Serie A, Inter beat Lazio 3–2 at Stadio Olimpico, which qualified them for the UEFA Champions League after a six-year absence. Later, in pre-season summer friendlies, Inter finished third place in 2018 International Champions Cup.

During the summer transfer window, Inter bought Radja Nainggolan from Roma and Lautaro Martínez from Racing Club, also signing Stefan de Vrij and Kwadwo Asamoah as free agents. Due to restrictions of Financial Fair Play Regulations, Inter cannot spend too much on transfer market. Thus, some new players are transferred via "loan with option to buy", including Matteo Politano from Sassuolo, Šime Vrsaljko from Atlético Madrid and Keita Baldé from AS Monaco. On 14 August 2018, club manager Luciano Spalletti signed a new contract to keep him at the club for the next three seasons, until 2021.

On 3 September 2018, Inter announced their squad list for 2018–19 UEFA Champions League group stage.

Internazionale completed a double over arch-rivals A.C. Milan. On 21 October 2018, a late Mauro Icardi strike assured Inter of a 1–0 victory over Milan. Icardi headed a Matias Vecino cross into an empty net, between A.C. Milan centre-backs Alessio Romagnoli and Mateo Musacchio into an empty net goalkeeper Gianluigi Donnarumma had abandoned to catch the cross. This was after both teams had goals disallowed in the first half, but ended a highly defensive second half. On 17 March 2019, Vecino half volleyed in a goal after Martinez assisted, a Perisic cross having found the Argentine. Inter made it two after Stefan De Vrij headed in a Matteo Politano cross from a short Inter Milan corner and the win was sealed after Politano went down in the Milan penalty area following a debatable foul by Milan winger Samu Castillejo. Martinez stepped up to score the resulting penalty kick. A Tiémoué Bakayoko header from a Hakan Calhanoglu free-kick and a Musacchio header from a Milan short corner were not enough for Inter's arch rivals and Inter completed the first league double in the Milan derby in a while.

Among Inter's other great victories were two thrashings of Genoa, a 5-0 thumping on 3 November 2018 and a 4-0 crushing on 3 April 2019. Inter's victory in November featured two outstanding performances from Roberto Gagliardini and Joao Mario, the former of whom scored two goals and the latter of whom assisted three goals and scored one himself. Gagliardini drew first blood for the hosts by pouncing on a loose ball, and two minutes later on 16 minutes Inter doubled their lead through Matteo Politano who finished an inviting pass from Mario, one-on-one with goalkeeper Ionuț Radu who watched the ball roll past him into the centre-right of the net. Radu spent the season at Genoa on loan from Inter Milan and transferred to the Genoese outfit permanently at the end of the season, in a solid campaign for the Romanian which was one of the bright sparks of an unnerving season for Genoa. A long throw at the start of the second half allowed Gagliardini to score his second goal via a Radu save following a Perisic shot. Mario scored in injury time to make the scoreline very convincing, a fine finish from just inside the penalty area after receiving the ball from Keita Balde. Mario grabbed his hat-trick of assists deep into injury time by setting up Radja Nainggolan who marked his return from injury with a goal. The scoreline was very representative of a game in which Inter dominated and had most of the chances and were rewarded with a high number of goals. Inter's visit to Genoa later in the season was again a good affair for the Nerazzuri. Gagliardini scored two again, the first after 15 minutes finishing a Kwadwo Asamoah cross after Perisic dummies the ball through to Gagliardini who in the centre right of the area tucked into the centre right of the goal. The goal was created by Matteo Politano's dribble down the left wing of the pitch. Genoa defender Cristian Romero was sent off on 39 minutes, receiving a red card for throwing Mauro Icardi to the floor, on the night of his first game since a fallout between Icardi's agent (and wife) and Inter Milan chiefs with the striker apparently desiring a transfer move in the summer, ideally to Real Madrid, though there were links of Icardi with Chelsea, which saw Icardi miss much of the season, in the penalty area. Icardi scored the resulting penalty to double Inter's lead and this began a more amicable relationship between player and club. Perisic's finish near the right-hand bottom corner of the goal from a one-two with Icardi made it three in the second half and with ten minutes to spare despite Radu's block of a Gagliardini header from a Perisic corner was judged to have crossed the line by goal-line technology, giving the Italian central midfielder his second goal of the night. It was another match Inter gloriously dominated.

Inter engulfed victories over A.C. Milan and Genoa in November inside a seven-game winning run, with defeat of Milan the fifth win on the trot in the league and victory over Genoa the seventh. Inter beat Sampdoria 1–0, Fiorentina 2–1, Cagliari 2–0, SPAL 2–1, A.C. Milan 1–0, Lazio 3–0 in another notable season's accomplishment, and Genoa 5–0 on this run of form. An Icardi double and a Brozovic goal were enough to ensure the win over Lazio, a game in which Inter goalkeeper Samir Handanovic was outstanding.

Inter otherwise went through a season of highs and lows. Early on in the season, Inter looked like they could bid for the title after the seven-game winning run left them few points behind Juventus and roughly level on points with Napoli. Following several draws and losses and a poor start to the year 2019, which first saw a win in February, courtesy of Martinez's winner at Parma, Inter dropped out of the title race, and spent the rest of the season challenging for a place in the 2019-20 UEFA Champions League group stage. A 1–0 victory over Napoli with Martinez nabbing the winner after Kalidou Koulibaly and Lorenzo Insigne were sent off for the Neapolitan side was retaliated for by a 4–1 thrashing in Naples which left Inter Milan leaving it until the last day of the season to secure a place in the UEFA Champions League for the 2019–20 season. Keita Balde's goal seemed to see Inter smoothly progress into the tournament of the European football elite, but an equaliser from opponents Empoli meant Inter's hopes were on a knife edge as Milan and Atalanta were winning their matches. A dramatic Nainggolan winner sent the San Siro into euphoria as Inter assured themselves of a Champions League place, though in the tense atmosphere, Inter (Keita Balde) and Empoli had players sent off before the match ended. The match condemned Empoli to relegation to Serie B. It, however, secured a Champions League place for Inter. It was a satisfactory season for the Nerazzuri, as relievingly Inter stayed at the same level as the season before but did not kick on as expected and so were a bit disappointing.

Inter fared poorly in the Coppa Italia, knocked out in their second match of the tournament by Lazio on penalties.

Inter Milan were unlucky to be knocked out in the group stages of the Champions League. Inter started their campaign by defeating Tottenham 2–1 after a great comeback including a late Vecino winner and then PSV Eindhoven were beaten 2-1 too in a nervy match. Defeat at Barcelona, though, was not followed well, as a draw against Barcelona, defeat to Tottenham and a draw with PSV allowed Tottenham's draw against Barcelona to see the eventual finalists of the season's competition through to the next round at the expense of Inter. In the defeat at Barcelona, Marcelo Brozovic's slide to the floor to block a Lionel Messi free-kick became a popular meme on social media due to the unusual nature of the tactic.

The Europa league also proved disappointing. Inter thrashed Rapid Vienna 5–0 on aggregate to progress to the round of 16 after being demoted as third-place in their Champions League group to the Europa League. They were beaten by Eintracht Frankfurt, though, because of a Luka Jovic goal at the San Siro.

Inter did, though, hold themselves up well and maintained progress, and so can be judged to have had a successful enough season. However, towards the end of the campaign, manager Luciano Spalletti was sacked and replaced by former Juventus, Italy and Chelsea managed Antonio Conte, owing to the club's desire to progress further than they had done this season.

== Players ==
=== Squad information ===
As of 26 May 2019

No.	Name	Nat	Position(s)	Date of birth (age)	Signed in	Contract ends	Signed from	Apps.	Goals	Notes
Goalkeepers
1	Samir Handanović	(Slovenia)	GK	14 July 1984 (aged 34)	2012	2021	(Italy) Udinese	257	0	Captain
27	Daniele Padelli ^{HG}	(Italy)	GK	25 October 1985 (aged 33)	2017	2019	(Italy) Torino	0	0	
46	Tommaso Berni ^{HG}	(Italy)	GK	6 March 1983 (aged 36)	2014	2019	(Italy) Torino	0	0	
93	Raffaele Di Gennaro ^{CT}	(Italy)	GK	3 October 1993 (aged 25)	2012		(Italy) Youth Sector	0	0	
Defenders
2	Šime Vrsaljko	(Croatia)	RB	10 January 1992 (aged 27)	2018	2019	(Spain) Atlético Madrid	10	0	Loan
6	Stefan de Vrij	(Netherlands)	CB	5 February 1992 (aged 27)	2018	2023	(Italy) Lazio	28	2	
13	Andrea Ranocchia ^{HG}	(Italy)	CB	16 February 1988 (aged 31)	2011	2021	(Italy) Genoa	149	9	Vice-captain
18	Kwadwo Asamoah	(Ghana)	LB / LWB / LM / CM	9 December 1988 (aged 30)	2018	2021	(Italy) Juventus	32	0	
21	Cédric Soares	(Portugal)	RB	31 August 1991 (aged 27)	2019	2019	(England) Southampton	4	0	Loan
23	Miranda	(Brazil)	CB	7 September 1984 (aged 34)	2015	2020	(Spain) Atlético Madrid	109	1	
29	Dalbert	(Brazil)	LB / LWB	5 September 1993 (aged 25)	2017	2023	(France) Nice	24	0	
33	Danilo D'Ambrosio ^{HG}	(Italy)	RB / LB / CB	9 September 1988 (aged 30)	2014	2021	(Italy) Torino	150	9	
37	Milan Škriniar	(Slovakia)	CB	11 February 1995 (aged 24)	2017	2022	(Italy) Sampdoria	73	4	
Midfielders
5	Roberto Gagliardini ^{HG}	(Italy)	DM / CM	8 April 1994 (aged 25)	2017	2023	(Italy) Atalanta	67	7	
8	Matías Vecino	(Uruguay)	CM / DM	24 August 1991 (aged 27)	2017	2022	(Italy) Fiorentina	59	6	
14	Radja Nainggolan ^{HG}	(Belgium)	CM / AM	4 May 1988 (aged 31)	2018	2022	(Italy) Roma	29	6	
15	João Mário	(Portugal)	CM / AM	19 January 1993 (aged 26)	2016	2021	(Portugal) Sporting CP	64	4	
20	Borja Valero	(Spain)	CM / AM	12 January 1985 (aged 34)	2017	2020	(Italy) Fiorentina	63	2	
77	Marcelo Brozović	(Croatia)	CM / AM	16 November 1992 (aged 26)	2015	2022	(Croatia) Dinamo Zagreb	133	15	
Forwards
9	Mauro Icardi ^{HG}	(Argentina)	ST	19 February 1993 (aged 26)	2013	2021	(Italy) Sampdoria	188	111	
10	Lautaro Martínez ^{U21}	(Argentina)	ST / SS	22 August 1997 (aged 21)	2018	2023	(Argentina) Racing	27	6	
11	Keita Baldé ^{HG}	(Senegal)	LW / RW / ST	8 March 1995 (aged 24)	2018	2019	(France) Monaco	24	5	Loan
16	Matteo Politano ^{HG}	(Italy)	RW / LW / SS	3 August 1993 (aged 25)	2018	2019	(Italy) Sassuolo	36	5	Loan
44	Ivan Perišić	(Croatia)	LM / LW	2 February 1989 (aged 30)	2015	2022	(Germany) Wolfsburg	141	37	
87	Antonio Candreva ^{HG}	(Italy)	RM / RW	28 February 1987 (aged 32)	2016	2021	(Italy) Lazio	92	7	
Players transferred during the season
7	Yann Karamoh ^{U21}	(France)	RW / LW	8 July 1998 (aged 20)	2017	2021	(France) Caen	17	1	Out on loan

- Note: Serie A imposes a cap on the first team squad at 25 players, with additional requirements on homegrown players (marked as ^{HG}) and club-trained players (marked as ^{CT}). However, league rules allow for unlimited club-trained players that are under-21 (marked as ^{U21}).

Due to the aforementioned reason, Inter only registered a 21-man squad for domestic competition, so Tommaso Berni was excluded. However, Berni can be re-registered by the club as a replacement for any injured goalkeepers. Inter also registered a different squad for European competition, which included goalkeeper Raffaele Di Gennaro, but excluded several players.

== Transfers ==
=== In ===
Date	Pos.	Player	Age	Moving from	Fee	Notes	Source
Summer
29 March 2018	DF	(Netherlands) Stefan de Vrij	26	(Italy) Lazio	Free	As free agent, deal officialized on 2 July	
17 May 2018	DF	(Ghana) Kwadwo Asamoah	29	(Italy) Juventus	Free	As free agent, deal officialized on 2 July	
26 June 2018	MF	(Belgium) Radja Nainggolan	30	(Italy) Roma	€38m	Sold Santon and Zaniolo as part of the deal	
30 June 2018	FW	(Italy) Matteo Politano	24	(Italy) Sassuolo	€5m	Loan with option to buy for €20m	
4 July 2018	FW	(Argentina) Lautaro Martínez	20	(Argentina) Racing	€23m		
5 July 2018	DF	(Italy) Federico Dimarco	20	(Switzerland) Sion	€7m	Buy-back clause	
17 July 2018	FW	(Italy) Samuele Mulattieri	17	(Italy) Spezia	Undisclosed		
1 August 2018	DF	(Croatia) Šime Vrsaljko	26	(Spain) Atlético Madrid	€6.5m	Loan with option to buy for €17.5m	
13 August 2018	FW	(Senegal) Keita Baldé	23	(France) AS Monaco	€5m	Loan with option to buy for €34m	
Winter
26 January 2019	DF	(Portugal) Cédric Soares	27	(England) Southampton	Undisclosed	Loan	
30 January 2019	DF	(Guadeloupe) Andreaw Gravillon	20	(Italy) Pescara	Transfer	Undisclosed	

==== Other acquisitions ====
Date	Pos.	Player	Age	Moving from	Fee	Notes	Source
Summer
23 May 2018	MF	(France) Geoffrey Kondogbia	25	(Spain) Valencia	Loan return	Subsequently, sold to Valencia	
30 June 2018	GK	(Italy) Francesco Bardi	26	(Italy) Frosinone	Loan return		
30 June 2018	GK	(Italy) Davide Costa	22	(Italy) Bassano Virtus	Loan return	Subsequently, sold to Rieti	
30 June 2018	GK	(Italy) Raffaele Di Gennaro	24	(Italy) Spezia	Loan return		
30 June 2018	GK	(Italy) Michele Di Gregorio	20	(Italy) Renate	Loan return		
30 June 2018	GK	(Romania) Ionuț Radu	21	(Italy) Avellino	Loan return		
30 June 2018	DF	(Italy) Andrea Bandini	24	(Italy) Brescia	Loan return		
30 June 2018	DF	(Italy) Andrea Cagnano	20	(Italy) Pisa	Loan return		
30 June 2018	DF	(Brazil) Dodô	26	(Italy) Sampdoria	Loan return	Sold to Sampdoria on loan obligation	
30 June 2018	DF	(Italy) Tommaso Equizi	20	(Italy) Fermana	Loan return	Subsequently, joined Levico Terme	
30 June 2018	DF	(Brazil) Ítalo	22	(Portugal) Olhanense	Loan return		
30 June 2018	DF	(Italy) Alessandro Mattioli	20	(Italy) Renate	Loan return		
30 June 2018	DF	(Japan) Yuto Nagatomo	31	(Turkey) Galatasaray	Loan return	Subsequently, sold to Galatasaray	
30 June 2018	DF	(Italy) Filippo Sgarbi	20	(Italy) Südtirol	Loan return	Subsequently, sold to Perugia	
30 June 2018	MF	(France) Axel Mohamed Bakayoko	20	(France) Sochaux	Loan return		
30 June 2018	MF	(Italy) Niccolò Belloni	23	(Italy) Carpi	Loan return	Subsequently, sold to Arezzo	
30 June 2018	MF	(France) Jonathan Biabiany	30	(Czech Republic) Sparta Prague	Loan return		
30 June 2018	MF	(Italy) Mattia Bonetto	21	(Italy) Prato	Loan return	Subsequently, sold to Reggina	
30 June 2018	MF	(Guinea) Gaston Camara	22	(Portugal) Gil Vicente	Loan return		
30 June 2018	MF	(Italy) Marco Carraro	20	(Italy) Pescara	Loan return	Subsequently, sold to Atalanta	
30 June 2018	MF	(Italy) Riccardo Gaiola	22	(Italy) Santarcangelo	Loan return		
30 June 2018	MF	(Portugal) João Mário	25	(England) West Ham United	Loan return		
30 June 2018	MF	(Honduras) Rigoberto Rivas	19	(Italy) Brescia	Loan return		
30 June 2018	MF	(Italy) Andrea Romanò	24	(Italy) Monza	Loan return		
30 June 2018	MF	(Italy) Lorenzo Tassi	23	(Italy) Vicenza	Loan return		
30 June 2018	MF	(Italy) Mel Taufer	20	(Italy) Arzachena	Loan return		
30 June 2018	FW	(Italy) Francesco Forte	25	(Italy) Spezia	Loan return		
30 June 2018	FW	(Italy) Samuele Longo	26	(Spain) Tenerife	Loan return		
30 June 2018	FW	(Albania) Rey Manaj	21	(Spain) Granada	Loan return		
30 June 2018	FW	(Romania) George Pușcaș	22	(Italy) Novara	Loan return	Subsequently, sold to Palermo	
30 June 2018	FW	(Italy) Vincenzo Tommasone	23	(Italy) Santarcangelo	Loan return		
30 June 2018	FW	(Guinea-Bissau) Zé Turbo	21	(Portugal) Olhanense	Loan return	Subsequently, sold to Newell's Old Boys	
14 July 2018	DF	(Italy) Alessandro Bastoni	19	(Italy) Atalanta	Loan return		
8 August 2018	GK	(Italy) Michele Di Gregorio	21	(Italy) Avellino	Loan return		
13 July 2018	GK	(Italy) Laurens Serpe	17	(Italy) Genoa	Loan		
16 July 2018	FW	(Italy) Eddie Salcedo	16	(Italy) Genoa	Loan		
18 July 2018	DF	(Italy) Andrea Rizzo Pinna	18	(Italy) Atalanta	Loan		
Winter
31 December 2018	DF	(Italy) Tommaso Brignoli	19	(Italy) Monza	Loan return		
31 December 2018	MF	(Italy) Andrea Palazzi	22	(Italy) Pescara	Loan return		
31 December 2018	MF	(Italy) Matteo Rover	19	(Italy) Vicenza Virtus	Loan return		
31 December 2018	FW	(Brazil) Gabriel Barbosa	22	(Brazil) Santos	Loan return		
30 January 2019	DF	(Italy) Alessandro Mattioli	20	(Italy) Cuneo	Loan return		
30 January 2019	MF	(Italy) Andrea Romanò	25	(Italy) Cuneo	Loan return		
30 January 2019	FW	(Italy) Samuele Longo	27	(Spain) Huesca	Loan return		
30 January 2019	DF	(Italy) Gabriele Zappa	19	(Italy) Pescara	Loan		

=== Out ===
Date	Pos.	Player	Age	Moving to	Fee	Notes	Source
Summer
24 May 2018	MF	(France) Geoffrey Kondogbia	25	(Spain) Valencia	€25m	Sold after loan	
26 June 2018	DF	(Italy) Davide Santon	27	(Italy) Roma	€9.5m	Part of the deal of Radja Nainggolan	
26 June 2018	MF	(Italy) Nicolò Zaniolo	18	(Italy) Roma	€4.5m	Part of the deal of Radja Nainggolan	
29 June 2018	DF	(Italy) Federico Valietti	19	(Italy) Genoa	Undisclosed		
29 June 2018	MF	(Italy) Davide Bettella	18	(Italy) Atalanta	Undisclosed		
30 June 2018	FW	(Denmark) Jens Odgaard	19	(Italy) Sassuolo	Undisclosed	Part of the deal of Matteo Politano	
1 July 2018	DF	(Brazil) Dodô	26	(Italy) Sampdoria	€5.5m	Sold on loan obligation	
1 July 2018	DF	(Italy) Tommaso Equizi	20	(Italy) Levico Terme	Free	Contract expiration	
1 July 2018	DF	(Japan) Yuto Nagatomo	31	(Turkey) Galatasaray	€2.5m	Sold after loan	
1 July 2018	MF	(Italy) Marco Carraro	20	(Italy) Atalanta	Undisclosed		
1 July 2018	GK	(Italy) Francesco Bardi	26	(Italy) Frosinone	€1m	Sold after loan	
2 July 2018	DF	(Italy) Filippo Sgarbi	20	(Italy) Perugia	Undisclosed		
7 July 2018	FW	(Guinea-Bissau) Zé Turbo	21	(Argentina) Newell's Old Boys	Free		
12 July 2018	MF	(Italy) Mattia Bonetto	21	(Italy) Reggina	Undisclosed		
13 July 2018	MF	(Albania) Armand Rada	19	(Italy) Renate	Undisclosed		
13 July 2018	FW	(Italy) Éder	31	(China) Jiangsu Suning	€5.5m		
17 July 2018	GK	(Italy) Davide Costa	22	(Italy) Rieti	Undisclosed		
24 July 2018	MF	(Italy) Elia Visconti	18	(Italy) Bologna	Undisclosed		
27 July 2018	FW	(Italy) Francesco Forte	25	(Belgium) Waasland-Beveren	Undisclosed		
7 August 2018	DF	(France) Jonathan Biabiany	30	(Italy) Parma	Undisclosed		
8 August 2018	FW	(Romania) George Pușcaș	22	(Italy) Palermo	Undisclosed		
14 August 2018	FW	(Italy) Cristian Mutton	20	(Italy) Giana Erminio	Undisclosed		
17 August 2018	FW	(Algeria) Mouhamed Belkheir	19	(Italy) Brescia	Undisclosed		
21 August 2018	MF	(Italy) Niccolò Belloni	24	(Italy) Arezzo	Undisclosed		
24 August 2018	MF	(Ghana) Stephen Danso	20	(Italy) Rimini	Undisclosed		
6 December 2018	MF	(Italy) Riccardo Gaiola	22	(Italy) Santarcangelo	Free	Contract expiration	
Winter
25 January 2019	FW	(Guinea) Moussa Souare	20	(San Marino) La Fiorita	Transfer	Undisclosed	
30 January 2019	DF	(Italy) Gabriele Zappa	19	(Italy) Pescara	Transfer	Undisclosed	

==== Other disposals ====
Date	Pos.	Player	Age	Moving to	Fee	Notes	Source
Summer
30 June 2018	DF	(Argentina) Lisandro López	28	(Portugal) Benfica	Loan return		
30 June 2018	DF	(Portugal) João Cancelo	24	(Spain) Valencia	Loan return		
30 June 2018	MF	(Brazil) Rafinha	25	(Spain) Barcelona	Loan return		
1 July 2018	GK	(Romania) Ionuț Radu	21	(Italy) Genoa	Loan	With obligation to buy	
1 July 2018	FW	(Albania) Rey Manaj	21	(Spain) Albacete	Loan	With obligation to buy	
4 July 2018	GK	(Italy) Michele Di Gregorio	20	(Italy) Avellino	Loan		
5 July 2018	DF	(Italy) Andrea Cagnano	20	(Italy) Pistoiese	Loan		
5 July 2018	FW	(Italy) Samuele Longo	26	(Spain) Huesca	Loan	With obligation to buy	
11 July 2018	GK	(Italy) Marco Pissardo	20	(Italy) Monopoli	Loan		
11 July 2018	DF	(Italy) Tommaso Brignoli	18	(Italy) Monza	Loan		
11 July 2018	DF	(Italy) Manuel Lombardoni	19	(Italy) Pro Patria	Loan		
17 July 2018	MF	(France) Axel Mohamed Bakayoko	20	(Switzerland) St. Gallen	Loan		
17 July 2018	FW	(Italy) Vincenzo Tommasone	23	(Italy) Rieti	Loan		
20 July 2018	MF	(Italy) Lorenzo Tassi	23	(Italy) Arezzo	Loan		
21 July 2018	MF	(Honduras) Rigoberto Rivas	19	(Italy) Ternana	Loan		
3 August 2018	DF	(Italy) Marco Sala	19	(Italy) Arezzo	Loan		
7 August 2018	DF	(Italy) Alessandro Bastoni	19	(Italy) Parma	Loan		
7 August 2018	DF	(Italy) Federico Dimarco	20	(Italy) Parma	Loan		
17 August 2018	MF	(Belgium) Xian Emmers	19	(Italy) Cremonese	Loan		
17 August 2018	FW	(Italy) Andrea Pinamonti	19	(Italy) Frosinone	Loan		
20 August 2018	DF	(Italy) Alessandro Mattioli	20	(Italy) Cuneo	Loan		
21 August 2018	MF	(Italy) Matteo Rover	19	(Italy) Vicenza Virtus	Loan		
24 August 2018	GK	(Italy) Michele Di Gregorio	21	(Italy) Novara	Loan		
24 August 2018	DF	(Italy) Andrea Bandini	24	(Italy) Rimini	Loan		
30 August 2018	MF	(Italy) Andrea Romanò	24	(Italy) Cuneo	Loan		
31 August 2018	FW	(France) Yann Karamoh	20	(France) Bordeaux	Loan		
1 July 2018	MF	(Guinea) Gaston Camara	22	Unattached		Contract expiration	
1 July 2018	MF	(Ivory Coast) Assane Gnoukouri	21	Unattached		Career break due to heart condition	
Winter
11 January 2019	MF	(Italy) Matteo Rover	19	(Italy) Pordenone	Loan		
11 January 2019	FW	(Brazil) Gabriel Barbosa	22	(Brazil) Flamengo	Loan		
14 January 2019	MF	(Italy) Andrea Palazzi	22	(Italy) Monza	Loan		
18 January 2019	FW	(Italy) Felice D'Amico	18	(Italy) Chievo	Loan		
24 January 2019	DF	(Italy) Tommaso Brignoli	19	(Italy) Rende	Loan		
30 January 2019	DF	(Guadeloupe) Andreaw Gravillon	20	(Italy) Pescara	Loan		
30 January 2019	FW	(Italy) Samuele Longo	27	(Italy) Cremonese	Loan	With obligation to buy on condition	
31 January 2019	DF	(Italy) Alessandro Mattioli	20	(Italy) Südtirol	Loan		
31 January 2019	MF	(Italy) Andrea Romanò	25	(Italy) Südtirol	Loan		

== Pre-season and friendlies ==
14 July 2018 Friendly	Lugano	0–3	Internazionale	Lugano, Switzerland
20:00 CEST (UTC+02:00)		Report	Martínez 16'; Karamoh 50', 55'	Stadium: Stadio Cornaredo; Referee: Luca Gut

18 July 2018 Friendly	Sion	2–0	Internazionale	Sion, Switzerland
18:30 CEST (UTC+02:00)	Neitzke 27'; Baltazar 70'	Report		Stadium: Stade Tourbillon; Referee: Alessandro Dudic

21 July 2018 Friendly	Internazionale	3–3	Zenit Saint Petersburg	Pisa, Italy
20:00 CEST (UTC+02:00)	Candreva 16'; Icardi 50' (pen.); Martínez 75'	Report	Noboa 27'; Mak 63'; Hernani 73'	Stadium: Arena Garibaldi; Referee: Gianluca Manganiello

24 July 2018 Friendly	Sheffield United	1–1	Internazionale	Sheffield, England
19:30 BST (UTC+01:00)	McGoldrick 28'	Report	Icardi 35'	Stadium: Bramall Lane; Referee: Bankes

=== International Champions Cup ===
28 July 2018 ICC	Chelsea	1–1 (5–4 p)	Internazionale	Nice, France
20:05 CEST (UTC+02:00)	Pedro 8'	Report	Gagliardini 49'; D'Ambrosio (yellow card) 87'	Stadium: Allianz Riviera; Attendance: 8,000; Referee: Nicolas Rainville (France)
	Penalties
	Jorginho (penalty scored); Drinkwater (penalty scored); Moses (penalty scored); Abraham (penalty scored); Azpilicueta (penalty scored)		(penalty scored) Ranocchia; (penalty scored) Gagliardini; (penalty scored) Martínez; (penalty missed) Škriniar; (penalty scored) Karamoh

4 August 2018 ICC	Internazionale	1–0	Lyon	Lecce, Italy
20:05 CEST (UTC+02:00)	Martínez 52', (yellow card) 63'; Ranocchia (yellow card) 72'	Report	Diop (yellow card) 39'; Martins (yellow card) 43'; Ferri (yellow card) 55'	Stadium: Stadio Via del Mare; Attendance: 24,698; Referee: Marco Di Bello (Italy)

11 August 2018 ICC	Atlético Madrid	0–1	Internazionale	Madrid, Spain
20:00 CEST (UTC+02:00)	Costa (yellow card) 24'	Report	Martínez 31', (yellow card) 62'	Stadium: Wanda Metropolitano; Attendance: 23,427; Referee: Alejandro Hernández Hernández (Spain)

== Competitions ==
=== Serie A ===
==== League table ====
Pos	Team	Pld	W	D	L	GF	GA	GD	Pts	Qualification or relegation
2	Napoli	38	24	7	7	74	36	+38	79	Qualification for the Champions League group stage
3	Atalanta	38	20	9	9	77	46	+31	69 (Note: Atalanta finished ahead of Internazionale on head-to-head points: Atalanta 4–1 Internazionale, Internazionale 0–0 Atalanta.)	Qualification for the Champions League group stage
4	Inter Milan	38	20	9	9	57	33	+24	69	Qualification for the Champions League group stage
5	Milan (Note: Milan were excluded from UEFA competitions over financial fair play violation.)	38	19	11	8	55	36	+19	68	
6	Roma	38	18	12	8	66	48	+18	66	Qualification for the Europa League group stage

Source: Serie A, Soccerway
Rules for classification: 1) Points; 2) Head-to-head points; 3) Head-to-head goal difference; 4) Goal difference; 5) Goals scored; 6) Draw. (Note: Head-to-head record is used only after all the matches between the teams in question have been played).

==== Results summary ====
Overall								Home						Away					
Pld	W	D	L	GF	GA	GD	Pts	W	D	L	GF	GA	GD	W	D	L	GF	GA	GD
38	20	9	9	57	33	+24	69	11	5	3	27	10	+17	9	4	6	30	23	+7

Last updated: 26 May 2019.
Source: Competitive matches

==== Results by round ====
Round	1	2	3	4	5	6	7	8	9	10	11	12	13	14	15	16	17	18	19	20	21	22	23	24	25	26	27	28	29	30	31	32	33	34	35	36	37	38
Ground	A	H	A	H	A	H	H	A	H	A	H	A	H	A	A	H	A	H	A	H	A	H	A	H	A	A	H	A	H	A	H	A	H	H	A	H	A	H
Result	L	D	W	L	W	W	W	W	W	W	W	L	W	D	L	W	D	W	W	D	L	L	W	W	D	L	W	W	L	W	D	W	D	D	D	W	L	W
Position	17	11	7	15	9	6	5	3	3	2	2	3	3	3	3	3	3	3	3	3	3	3	3	3	3	4	4	3	3	3	3	3	3	3	3	3	4	4

Updated to match(es) played on 26 May 2019. Source: Competitive matches
A = Away; H = Home; W = Win; D = Draw; L = Loss

==== Matches ====
19 August 2018 1	Sassuolo	1–0	Internazionale	Reggio Emilia
20:30 CEST (UTC+02:00)	Duncan (yellow card) 6'; Rogério (yellow card) 16'; Berardi 27' (pen.); Sensi (yellow card) 90'	Report	Miranda (yellow card) 26'; Vecino (yellow card) 54'	Stadium: Mapei Stadium – Città del Tricolore; Attendance: 19,620; Referee: Maurizio Mariani

26 August 2018 2	Internazionale	2–2	Torino	Milan
20:30 CEST (UTC+02:00)	Perišić 7'; De Vrij 32', (yellow card) 44'	Report	Meïté (yellow card) 33', (goal) 68'; Moretti (yellow card) 36'; Belotti 56'	Stadium: San Siro; Attendance: 59,135; Referee: Paolo Mazzoleni

1 September 2018 3	Bologna	0–3	Internazionale	Bologna
18:00 CEST (UTC+02:00)	Džemaili (yellow card) 60'	Report	Nainggolan 67'; Candreva 82'; Perišić 85'; Gagliardini (yellow card) 88'	Stadium: Stadio Renato Dall'Ara; Attendance: 26,082; Referee: Marco Di Bello

15 September 2018 4	Internazionale	0–1	Parma	Milan
15:00 CEST (UTC+02:00)	Brozović (yellow card) 31'; D'Ambrosio (yellow card) 67'	Report	Štulac (yellow card) 24'; Dimarco 79', (yellow card) 80'	Stadium: San Siro; Attendance: 59,648; Referee: Gianluca Manganello

22 September 2018 5	Sampdoria	0–1	Internazionale	Genoa
20:30 CEST (UTC+02:00)	Linetty (yellow card) 6'; Defrel (yellow card) 90+3'; Tonelli (yellow card) 90+5'	Report	Miranda (yellow card) 20'; Valero (yellow card) 90+1'; Brozović 90+4'	Stadium: Stadio Luigi Ferraris; Attendance: 22,835; Referee: Marco Guida

25 September 2018 6	Internazionale	2–1	Fiorentina	Milan
21:00 CEST (UTC+02:00)	Icardi 45' (pen.); Asamoah (yellow card) 72'; D'Ambrosio 77'	Report	Chiesa (yellow card) 19'; Škriniar 53' (o.g.); Fernandes (yellow card) 45+2'; Mirallas (yellow card) 84'	Stadium: San Siro; Attendance: 55,840; Referee: Paolo Mazzoleni

29 September 2018 7	Internazionale	2–0	Cagliari	Milan
20:30 CEST (UTC+02:00)	Martínez 12'; Dalbert (yellow card) 86'; Politano 89'	Report	Andreolli (yellow card) 44'; Bradarić (yellow card) 49'; Pisacane (yellow card) 56'; Dessena (yellow card) 73'	Stadium: San Siro; Attendance: 55,487; Referee: Davide Massa

7 October 2018 8	SPAL	1–2	Internazionale	Ferrara
20:30 CEST (UTC+02:00)	Lazzari (yellow card) 31'; Valoti (yellow card) 50'; Missiroli (yellow card) 53'; Paloschi 72'; Schiattarella (yellow card) 84'; Everton Luiz (yellow card) 85'; Felipe (yellow card) 86'	Report	Icardi 14', 78'; Vrsaljko (yellow card) 52'; Miranda (yellow card) 80'	Stadium: Stadio Paolo Mazza; Attendance: 15,750; Referee: Fabio Maresca

21 October 2018 9	Internazionale	1–0	Milan	Milan
20:30 CEST (UTC+02:00)	Politano (yellow card) 75'; Icardi 90+2'; Keita (yellow card) 90+5'	Report	Biglia (yellow card) 20'; Çalhanoğlu (yellow card) 44'; Calabria (yellow card) 45+2'; Suso (yellow card) 61'; Bakayoko (yellow card) 90+1'	Stadium: San Siro; Attendance: 78,275; Referee: Marco Guida

29 October 2018 10	Lazio	0–3	Internazionale	Rome
20:30 CET (UTC+01:00)	Immobile (yellow card) 31'; Radu (yellow card) 48'; Cataldi (yellow card) 71'	Report	Brozović (yellow card) 19', (goal) 41'; Asamoah (yellow card) 26'; Icardi 28', 70'; Vrsaljko (yellow card) 49'	Stadium: Stadio Olimpico; Attendance: 40,000; Referee: Massimiliano Irrati

3 November 2018 11	Internazionale	5–0	Genoa	Milan
15:00 CET (UTC+01:00)	D'Ambrosio (yellow card) 8'; Gagliardini 14', 49'; Politano 16'; Martínez (yellow card) 31'; João Mário 90+1'; Nainggolan 90+4'	Report	Günter (yellow card) 18'; Sandro (yellow card) 34'; Veloso (yellow card) 74'	Stadium: San Siro; Attendance: 67,532; Referee: Paolo Valeri

11 November 2018 12	Atalanta	4–1	Internazionale	Bergamo
12:30 CET (UTC+01:00)	Hateboer 9', (yellow card) 69'; Mancini 62'; De Roon (yellow card) 78'; Gómez (yellow card) 79', (goal) 90+4'; Djimsiti 88'	Report	Vecino (yellow card) 25'; Brozović (yellow card) 35' (yellow-red card) 90+2'; Škriniar (yellow card) 41'; Icardi 47' (pen.); Gagliardini (yellow card) 76'	Stadium: Stadio Atleti Azzurri d'Italia; Attendance: 20,633; Referee: Fabio Maresca

24 November 2018 13	Internazionale	3–0	Frosinone	Milan
20:30 CET (UTC+01:00)	Keita 10', 82'; Asamoah (yellow card) 14'; Martínez 57'	Report	Crisetig (yellow card) 6'; Beghetto (yellow card) 40'; Cassata (yellow card) 44'	Stadium: San Siro; Attendance: 63,645; Referee: Luca Pairetto

2 December 2018 14	Roma	2–2	Internazionale	Rome
20:30 CET (UTC+01:00)	Ünder 51'; Kolarov 74' (pen.), (yellow card) 79'	Report	Keita 37'; Asamoah (yellow card) 48'; Icardi 66'	Stadium: Stadio Olimpico; Attendance: 41,009; Referee: Gianluca Rocchi

7 December 2018 15	Juventus	1–0	Internazionale	Turin
20:30 CET (UTC+01:00)	Pjanić (yellow card) 6'; Bentancur (yellow card) 54'; Mandžukić 66'	Report	Perišić (yellow card) 55'; Brozović (yellow card) 57'	Stadium: Allianz Stadium; Attendance: 41,495; Referee: Massimiliano Irrati

15 December 2018 16	Internazionale	1–0	Udinese	Milan
18:00 CET (UTC+01:00)	Asamoah (yellow card) 20'; Politano (yellow card) 58'; Icardi 76' (pen.); Martínez (yellow card) 79'	Report	Musso (yellow card) 71'	Stadium: San Siro; Attendance: 57,025; Referee: Rosario Abisso

22 December 2018 17	Chievo	1–1	Internazionale	Verona
18:00 CET (UTC+01:00)	Hetemaj (yellow card) 41'; Rigoni (yellow card) 61'; Pellissier 90+1'	Report	Perišić 39'; João Mário (yellow card) 53'; Brozović (yellow card) 59'	Stadium: Stadio Marc'Antonio Bentegodi; Attendance: 19,750; Referee: Fabrizio Pasqua

26 December 2018 18	Internazionale	1–0	Napoli	Milan
20:30 CET (UTC+01:00)	Brozović (yellow card) 29'; Valero (yellow card) 52'; Martínez 90+1', (yellow card) 90+2'	Report	Allan (yellow card) 56'; Albiol (yellow card) 67'; Koulibaly (yellow card) 80', (red card) 81'; Insigne (red card) 90+5'	Stadium: San Siro; Attendance: 63,946; Referee: Paolo Mazzoleni

29 December 2018 19	Empoli	0–1	Internazionale	Empoli
15:00 CET (UTC+01:00)	Bennacer (yellow card) 74'	Report	Martínez (yellow card) 68'; Keita 72'	Stadium: Stadio Carlo Castellani; Attendance: 10,393; Referee: Federico La Penna

19 January 2019 20	Internazionale	0–0	Sassuolo	Milan
20:30 CET (UTC+01:00)	Brozović (yellow card) 50'	Report	Sensi (yellow card) 32'; Rogério (yellow card) 51'; Peluso (yellow card) 90+3'	Stadium: San Siro; Attendance: 11,000; Referee: Luca Pairetto

27 January 2019 21	Torino	1–0	Internazionale	Turin
18:00 CET (UTC+01:00)	Izzo 35'; Belotti (yellow card) 40'; Aina (yellow card) 76'; Zaza (yellow card) 84'	Report	De Vrij (yellow card) 31'; Dalbert (yellow card) 45+2'; D'Ambrosio (yellow card) 55'; Politano (red card) 86'	Stadium: Stadio Olimpico Grande Torino; Attendance: 22,002; Referee: Fabio Maresca

3 February 2019 22	Internazionale	0–1	Bologna	Milan
18:00 CET (UTC+01:00)	Vecino (yellow card) 44'	Report	Santander 33'; Mbaye (yellow card) 41'; Danilo (yellow card) 65'	Stadium: San Siro; Attendance: 51,566; Referee: Fabrizio Pasqua

9 February 2019 23	Parma	0–1	Internazionale	Parma
20:30 CET (UTC+01:00)	Gagliolo (yellow card) 61'; Biabiany (yellow card) 89'	Report	Vecino (yellow card) 37'; Martínez 79'; Nainggolan (yellow card) 85'	Stadium: Stadio Ennio Tardini; Attendance: 18,155; Referee: Massimiliano Irrati

17 February 2019 24	Internazionale	2–1	Sampdoria	Milan
18:00 CET (UTC+01:00)	D'Ambrosio (yellow card) 17', (goal) 73'; Perišić (yellow card) 24'; Škriniar (yellow card) 31'; Nainggolan 78'	Report	Linetty (yellow card) 28'; Gabbiadini 76'	Stadium: San Siro; Attendance: 55,127; Referee: Daniele Doveri

24 February 2019 25	Fiorentina	3–3	Internazionale	Florence
20:30 CET (UTC+01:00)	De Vrij 1' (o.g.); Muriel 74'; Lafont (yellow card) 87'; Veretout 90+11' (pen.); Dabo (yellow card) 90+12'	Report	Vecino 6'; Politano 40', (yellow card) 71'; Perišić 52' (pen.); Nainggolan (yellow card) 57'; Škriniar (yellow card) 65'; Brozović (yellow card) 89'	Stadium: Stadio Artemio Franchi; Attendance: 32,824; Referee: Rosario Abisso

1 March 2019 26	Cagliari	2–1	Internazionale	Cagliari
20:30 CET (UTC+01:00)	Cigarini (yellow card) 8'; João Pedro (yellow card) 20'; Ceppitelli 31'; Pavoletti 43', (yellow card) 79'; Faragò (yellow card) 76'; Cragno (yellow card) 90+5'	Report	Škriniar (yellow card) 29'; Martínez 38'; Vecino (yellow card) 66'; Brozović (yellow card) 71'	Stadium: Sardegna Arena; Attendance: 16,223; Referee: Luca Banti

10 March 2019 27	Internazionale	2–0	SPAL	Milan
15:00 CET (UTC+01:00)	Gagliardini (yellow card) 19', (goal) 77'; João Mário (yellow card) 57'; Politano 67'; Ranocchia (yellow card) 90+2'	Report	Missiroli (yellow card) 29'; Petagna (yellow card) 45'; Valoti (yellow card) 57'; Felipe (yellow card) 63'; Vicari (yellow card) 90'	Stadium: San Siro; Attendance: 61,339; Referee: Gianpaolo Calvarese

17 March 2019 28	Milan	2–3	Internazionale	Milan
20:30 CET (UTC+01:00)	Rodríguez (yellow card) 32'; Bakayoko 57'; Romagnoli (yellow card) 66'; Musacchio 71'; Suso (yellow card) 80'; Conti (yellow card) 89'	Report	Vecino 3', (yellow card) 79'; Brozović (yellow card) 14'; De Vrij 51'; Martínez 67' (pen.); Gagliardini (yellow card) 90+3'	Stadium: San Siro; Attendance: 77,479; Referee: Marco Guida

31 March 2019 29	Internazionale	0–1	Lazio	Milan
20:30 CEST (UTC+02:00)		Report	Milinković-Savić 13'	Stadium: San Siro; Attendance: 56,348; Referee: Paolo Mazzoleni

3 April 2019 30	Genoa	0–4	Internazionale	Genoa
21:00 CEST (UTC+02:00)	Lerager (yellow card) 14'; Zukanović (yellow card) 36'; Romero (red card) 39'	Report	Gagliardini 15', 81'; Asamoah (yellow card) 27'; Icardi 40' (pen.); Perišić 54'	Stadium: Stadio Luigi Ferraris; Attendance: 21,865; Referee: Maurizio Mariani

7 April 2019 31	Internazionale	0–0	Atalanta	Milan
18:00 CEST (UTC+02:00)	Politano (yellow card) 73'	Report	Gollini (yellow card) 2'; Mancini (yellow card) 63'	Stadium: San Siro; Attendance: 60,860; Referee: Massimiliano Irrati

14 April 2019 32	Frosinone	1–3	Internazionale	Frosinone
20:30 CEST (UTC+02:00)	Paganini (yellow card) 31'; Chibsah (yellow card) 35'; Cassata 61'; Ciano (yellow card) 83'	Report	Nainggolan 19'; Perišić 37' (pen.); Vecino (yellow card) 48', (goal) 90+3'	Stadium: Stadio Benito Stirpe; Attendance: 15,856; Referee: Davide Massa

20 April 2019 33	Internazionale	1–1	Roma	Milan
20:30 CEST (UTC+02:00)	Perišić 61'; Vecino (yellow card) 62'	Report	El Shaarawy 14'; Cristante (yellow card) 76'; Zaniolo (yellow card) 84'	Stadium: San Siro; Attendance: 60,013; Referee: Marco Guida

27 April 2019 34	Internazionale	1–1	Juventus	Milan
20:30 CEST (UTC+02:00)	Nainggolan 7'; Perišić (yellow card) 44'	Report	Cuadrado (yellow card) 40'; Chiellini (yellow card) 45+1'; Ronaldo 62'; Kean (yellow card) 90+2'	Stadium: San Siro; Attendance: 73,855; Referee: Luca Banti

4 May 2019 35	Udinese	0–0	Internazionale	Udine
20:30 CEST (UTC+02:00)	Sandro (yellow card) 13'	Report	D'Ambrosio (yellow card) 15'; Valero (yellow card) 40'; Brozović (yellow card) 66'	Stadium: Dacia Arena; Attendance: 24,741; Referee: Gianluca Rocchi

13 May 2019 36	Internazionale	2–0	Chievo	Milan
21:00 CEST (UTC+02:00)	Valero (yellow card) 18'; Politano 39'; Perišić (yellow card) 70', (goal) 86'	Report	Grubac (yellow card) 26'; Rigoni (yellow card) 36' (yellow-red card) 76'	Stadium: San Siro; Attendance: 57,855; Referee: Paolo Valeri

19 May 2019 37	Napoli	4–1	Internazionale	Naples
20:30 CEST (UTC+02:00)	Koulibaly (yellow card) 9'; Zieliński 16'; Allan (yellow card) 49'; Mertens 61'; Fabián 71', 78'; Ghoulam (yellow card) 90+2'	Report	Nainggolan (yellow card) 48'; Icardi 81' (pen.)	Stadium: Stadio San Paolo; Attendance: 25,445; Referee: Daniele Doveri

26 May 2019 38	Internazionale	2–1	Empoli	Milan
20:30 CEST (UTC+02:00)	Keita 51', (yellow card) 52' (yellow-red card) 90+7'; Perišić (yellow card) 72'; Nainggolan 81'; D'Ambrosio (yellow card) 90+9'	Report	Pajač (yellow card) 64'; Traorè 76'; Caputo (yellow card) 90+5'; Perucchini (red card) 90+8'	Stadium: San Siro; Attendance: 68,051; Referee: Luca Banti

=== Coppa Italia ===
13 January 2019 Round of 16	Internazionale	6–2	Benevento	Milan
18:00 CET (UTC+01:00)	Icardi 3' (pen.); Candreva 7', 90+5'; Vrsaljko (yellow card) 12'; Gagliardini (yellow card) 18'; Dalbert 45+1'; Martínez 48', 66'	Report	Insigne 58'; Montipò (yellow card) 68'; Bandinelli 74'	Stadium: San Siro; Attendance: 0 Referee: Antonio Giua
Note: The Inter v Benevento match was played behind closed doors due to punishment by Serie A after alleged racist chants by Inter supporters in their match against Napoli.

31 January 2019 Quarter-finals	Internazionale	1–1 (a.e.t.) (3–4 p)	Lazio	Milan
21:00 CET (UTC+01:00)	Gagliardini (yellow card) 44'; Vecino (yellow card) 82'; Brozović (yellow card) 110'; Asamoah (yellow card) 118'; Icardi 120+5' (pen.)	Report	Wallace (yellow card) 68'; Radu (yellow card) 73', (red card) 120+4'; Marušić (yellow card) 86'; Milinković-Savić (yellow card) 87'; Lucas (yellow card) 96'; Immobile 108', (yellow card) 109'	Stadium: San Siro; Attendance: 23,408; Referee: Rosario Abisso
	Penalties
	Brozović (penalty scored); Martínez (penalty missed); Icardi (penalty scored); Cédric (penalty scored); Nainggolan (penalty missed)		(penalty scored) Immobile; (penalty missed) Durmisi; (penalty scored) Parolo; (penalty scored) Acerbi; (penalty scored) Lucas

=== UEFA Champions League ===
==== Group stage ====
Pos	Team	Pld	W	D	L	GF	GA	GD	Pts	Qualification	BAR	TOT	INT	PSV
1	(Spain) Barcelona	6	4	2	0	14	5	+9	14	Advance to knockout phase	—	1–1	2–0	4–0
2	(England) Tottenham Hotspur	6	2	2	2	9	10	−1	8 (Note: Head-to-head away goals: Tottenham Hotspur 1, Inter Milan 0.)	Advance to knockout phase	2–4	—	1–0	2–1
3	(Italy) Inter Milan	6	2	2	2	6	7	−1	8	Transfer to Europa League	1–1	2–1	—	1–1
4	(Netherlands) PSV Eindhoven	6	0	2	4	6	13	−7	2		1–2	2–2	1–2	—

Source: UEFA
Rules for classification: Group stage tiebreakers
Notes:

18 September 2018 1	Internazionale (Italy)	2–1	(England) Tottenham Hotspur	Milan, Italy
18:55 CEST (UTC+02:00)	Škriniar (yellow card) 21'; Perišić (yellow card) 43'; Icardi 86'; Vecino 90+2'	Report	Sánchez (yellow card) 38'; Vertonghen (yellow card) 51'; Eriksen 53'; Vorm (yellow card) 82'	Stadium: San Siro; Attendance: 64,123; Referee: Clément Turpin (France)

3 October 2018 2	PSV Eindhoven (Netherlands)	1–2	(Italy) Internazionale	Eindhoven, Netherlands
21:00 CEST (UTC+02:00)	Rosario 27'	Report	Handanović (yellow card) 41'; Nainggolan 44'; D'Ambrosio (yellow card) 45'; Icardi 60'; Asamoah (yellow card) 86'	Stadium: Philips Stadion; Attendance: 34,750; Referee: Milorad Mažić (Serbia)

24 October 2018 3	Barcelona (Spain)	2–0	(Italy) Internazionale	Barcelona, Spain
21:00 CEST (UTC+02:00)	Rafinha 32'; Suárez (yellow card) 62'; Alba 83'	Report	Brozović (yellow card) 73'; Škriniar (yellow card) 74'; Martínez (yellow card) 85'	Stadium: Camp Nou; Attendance: 86,290; Referee: Ovidiu Haţegan (Romania)

6 November 2018 4	Internazionale (Italy)	1–1	(Spain) Barcelona	Milan, Italy
21:00 CET (UTC+01:00)	Brozović (yellow card) 84'; Icardi 87'; Perišić (yellow card) 88'	Report	Rakitić (yellow card) 42'; Malcom 83'	Stadium: San Siro; Attendance: 70,915; Referee: Szymon Marciniak (Poland)

28 November 2018 5	Tottenham Hotspur (England)	1–0	(Italy) Internazionale	London, England
21:00 CET (UTC+01:00)	Alderweireld (yellow card) 28'; Lamela (yellow card) 45'; Son Heung-min (yellow card) 73'; Eriksen 80'	Report	De Vrij (yellow card) 70'; Valero (yellow card) 81'	Stadium: Wembley Stadium; Attendance: 57,132; Referee: Cüneyt Çakır (Turkey)

11 December 2018 6	Internazionale (Italy)	1–1	(Netherlands) PSV Eindhoven	Milan, Italy
21:00 CET (UTC+01:00)	Brozović (yellow card) 44'; Politano (yellow card) 71'; Icardi 73'; Škriniar (yellow card) 90+5'	Report	Lozano 13'; Zoet (yellow card) 52'; Bergwijn (yellow card) 71'; Sadílek (yellow card) 86'; Dumfries (yellow card) 90+1'	Stadium: San Siro; Attendance: 62,533; Referee: Felix Zwayer (Germany)

=== UEFA Europa League ===
==== Knockout phase ====
===== Round of 32 =====
14 February 2019 First leg	Rapid Wien (Austria)	0–1	(Italy) Internazionale	Vienna, Austria
18:55 CET (UTC+01:00)	Sonnleitner (yellow card) 14'; Hofmann (yellow card) 52'; Berisha (yellow card) 82'; Potzmann (yellow card) 84'	Report	Martínez 39' (pen.), (yellow card) 61'; Cédric (yellow card) 82'; D'Ambrosio (yellow card) 85'; Candreva (yellow card) 86'	Stadium: Allianz Stadion; Attendance: 23,850; Referee: Tobias Stieler (Germany)

21 February 2019 Second leg	Internazionale (Italy)	4–0 (5–0 agg.)	(Austria) Rapid Wien	Milan, Italy
21:00 CET (UTC+01:00)	Vecino 11'; Asamoah (yellow card) 14'; Ranocchia 18', (yellow card) 79'; Perišić 80'; Politano 87'	Report	Hofmann (yellow card) 18'	Stadium: San Siro; Attendance: 32,158; Referee: Artur Soares Dias (Portugal)

===== Round of 16 =====
7 March 2019 First leg	Eintracht Frankfurt (Germany)	0–0	(Italy) Internazionale	Frankfurt, Germany
18:55 CET (UTC+01:00)	Kostić (yellow card) 4'; Hasebe (yellow card) 53'; Fernandes (yellow card) 82'	Report	Asamoah (yellow card) 24'; Martínez (yellow card) 33'; Candreva (yellow card) 59'	Stadium: Waldstadion; Attendance: 48,000; Referee: Willie Collum (Scotland)

14 March 2019 Second leg	Internazionale (Italy)	0–1 (0–1 agg.)	(Germany) Eintracht Frankfurt	Milan, Italy
21:00 CET (UTC+01:00)	D'Ambrosio (yellow card) 21'; Valero (yellow card) 52'; Škriniar (yellow card) 90+3'	Report	Jović 6'; Haller (yellow card) 58'; Rode (yellow card) 63'; Paciência (yellow card) 90+2'	Stadium: San Siro; Attendance: 49,866; Referee: Ovidiu Hațegan (Romania)

== Statistics ==
=== Appearances and goals ===
No.	Pos	Nat	Player	Total		Serie A		Coppa Italia		Champions League		Europa League	
No.	Pos	Nat	Player	Apps	Goals	Apps	Goals	Apps	Goals	Apps	Goals	Apps	Goals
Goalkeepers
1	GK	(Slovenia) SLO	Samir Handanović	49	0	38	0	1	0	6	0	4	0
27	GK	(Italy) ITA	Daniele Padelli	1	0	0	0	1	0	0	0	0	0
46	GK	(Italy) ITA	Tommaso Berni	0	0	0	0	0	0	0	0	0	0
93	GK	(Italy) ITA	Raffaele Di Gennaro	0	0	0	0	0	0	0	0	0	0
Defenders
2	DF	(Croatia) CRO	Šime Vrsaljko	13	0	8+2	0	1	0	1+1	0	0	0
6	DF	(Netherlands) NED	Stefan de Vrij	36	2	28	2	0	0	5	0	3	0
13	DF	(Italy) ITA	Andrea Ranocchia	7	1	0+4	0	1	0	0	0	1+1	1
18	DF	(Ghana) GHA	Kwadwo Asamoah	42	0	30+2	0	1	0	6	0	3	0
21	DF	(Portugal) POR	Cédric Soares	9	0	3+1	0	0+1	0	0	0	3+1	0
23	DF	(Brazil) BRA	Miranda	20	0	14	0	1	0	2+1	0	1+1	0
29	DF	(Brazil) BRA	Dalbert	12	1	9+2	0	1	1	0	0	0	0
33	DF	(Italy) ITA	Danilo D'Ambrosio	38	2	29+1	2	1	0	4	0	2+1	0
37	DF	(Slovakia) SVK	Milan Škriniar	46	0	35	0	2	0	6	0	3	0
Midfielders
5	MF	(Italy) ITA	Roberto Gagliardini	21	5	13+6	5	2	0	0	0	0	0
8	MF	(Uruguay) URU	Matías Vecino	40	5	23+7	3	0+1	0	5	1	4	1
14	MF	(Belgium) BEL	Radja Nainggolan	36	7	22+7	6	0+1	0	4	1	2	0
15	MF	(Portugal) POR	João Mário	22	1	12+8	1	1+1	0	0	0	0	0
20	MF	(Spain) ESP	Borja Valero	38	0	12+15	0	0+1	0	2+4	0	3+1	0
77	MF	(Croatia) CRO	Marcelo Brozović	42	2	31+1	2	2	0	6	0	2	0
87	MF	(Italy) ITA	Antonio Candreva	29	3	5+13	1	2	2	2+3	0	2+2	0
Forwards
9	FW	(Argentina) ARG	Mauro Icardi	37	17	24+5	11	2	2	6	4	0	0
10	FW	(Argentina) ARG	Lautaro Martínez	35	9	13+14	6	1+1	2	0+3	0	3	1
11	FW	(Senegal) SEN	Keita Baldé	29	5	8+16	5	0	0	0+4	0	1	0
16	FW	(Italy) ITA	Matteo Politano	48	6	31+5	5	1+1	0	5+1	0	3+1	1
44	FW	(Croatia) CRO	Ivan Perišić	45	9	30+4	8	1	0	6	0	4	1
68	FW	(Italy) ITA	Davide Merola	1	0	0	0	0	0	0	0	0+1	0
70	FW	(Italy) ITA	Sebastiano Esposito	1	0	0	0	0	0	0	0	0+1	0
Players transferred out during the season
7	FW	(France) FRA	Yann Karamoh	1	0	0+1	0	0	0	0	0	0	0

Last updated: 26 May 2019
Source: Competitions

=== Goalscorers ===
Rank	No.	Pos	Nat	Name	Serie A	Coppa Italia	UEFA CL	UEFA EL	Total
1	9	FW	(Argentina)	Mauro Icardi	11	2	4	0	17
2	10	FW	(Argentina)	Lautaro Martínez	6	2	0	1	9
3	44	MF	(Croatia)	Ivan Perišić	8	0	0	1	9
4	14	MF	(Belgium)	Radja Nainggolan	6	0	1	0	7
5	16	FW	(Italy)	Matteo Politano	5	0	0	1	6
6	5	MF	(Italy)	Roberto Gagliardini	5	0	0	0	5
6	8	MF	(Uruguay)	Matías Vecino	3	0	1	1	5
6	11	FW	(Senegal)	Keita Baldé	5	0	0	0	5
9	87	MF	(Italy)	Antonio Candreva	1	2	0	0	3
10	6	DF	(Netherlands)	Stefan de Vrij	2	0	0	0	2
10	33	DF	(Italy)	Danilo D'Ambrosio	2	0	0	0	2
10	77	MF	(Croatia)	Marcelo Brozović	2	0	0	0	2
13	13	DF	(Italy)	Andrea Ranocchia	0	0	0	1	1
13	15	MF	(Portugal)	João Mário	1	0	0	0	1
13	29	DF	(Brazil)	Dalbert	0	1	0	0	1
Own goal					0	0	0	0	0
Totals					57	7	6	5	75

Last updated: 26 May 2019

=== Clean sheets ===
Rank	No.	Pos	Nat	Name	Serie A	Coppa Italia	UEFA CL	UEFA EL	Total
1	1	GK	(Slovenia)	Samir Handanović	17	0	0	3	20
Totals					17	0	0	3	20

Last updated: 13 May 2019

=== Disciplinary record ===
No.	Pos	Nat	Name	Serie A			Coppa Italia			UEFA CL			UEFA EL			Total		
No.	Pos	Nat	Name	Yellow card	(yellow card) (yellow-red card)	Red card	Yellow card	(yellow card) (yellow-red card)	Red card	Yellow card	(yellow card) (yellow-red card)	Red card	Yellow card	(yellow card) (yellow-red card)	Red card	Yellow card	(yellow card) (yellow-red card)	Red card
1	GK	(Slovenia)	Samir Handanović	0	0	0	0	0	0	1	0	0	0	0	0	1	0	0
2	DF	(Croatia)	Šime Vrsaljko	2	0	0	1	0	0	0	0	0	0	0	0	3	0	0
6	DF	(Netherlands)	Stefan de Vrij	2	0	0	0	0	0	1	0	0	0	0	0	3	0	0
13	DF	(Italy)	Andrea Ranocchia	1	0	0	0	0	0	0	0	0	1	0	0	2	0	0
18	DF	(Ghana)	Kwadwo Asamoah	6	0	0	1	0	0	1	0	0	2	0	0	10	0	0
21	DF	(Portugal)	Cédric Soares	0	0	0	0	0	0	0	0	0	1	0	0	1	0	0
23	DF	(Brazil)	Miranda	3	0	0	0	0	0	0	0	0	0	0	0	3	0	0
29	DF	(Brazil)	Dalbert	2	0	0	0	0	0	0	0	0	0	0	0	2	0	0
33	DF	(Italy)	Danilo D'Ambrosio	6	0	0	0	0	0	1	0	0	2	0	0	9	0	0
37	DF	(Slovakia)	Milan Škriniar	4	0	0	0	0	0	3	0	0	1	0	0	8	0	0
5	MF	(Italy)	Roberto Gagliardini	4	0	0	2	0	0	0	0	0	0	0	0	6	0	0
8	MF	(Uruguay)	Matías Vecino	8	0	0	1	0	0	0	0	0	0	0	0	9	0	0
14	MF	(Belgium)	Radja Nainggolan	3	0	0	0	0	0	0	0	0	0	0	0	3	0	0
15	MF	(Portugal)	João Mário	2	0	0	0	0	0	0	0	0	0	0	0	2	0	0
20	MF	(Spain)	Borja Valero	4	0	0	0	0	0	1	0	0	1	0	0	6	0	0
77	MF	(Croatia)	Marcelo Brozović	10	1	0	1	0	0	3	0	0	0	0	0	14	1	0
87	MF	(Italy)	Antonio Candreva	0	0	0	0	0	0	0	0	0	2	0	0	2	0	0
10	FW	(Argentina)	Lautaro Martínez	4	0	0	0	0	0	1	0	0	2	0	0	7	0	0
11	FW	(Senegal)	Keita Baldé	1	1	0	0	0	0	0	0	0	0	0	0	1	1	0
16	FW	(Italy)	Matteo Politano	4	0	1	0	0	0	1	0	0	0	0	0	5	0	1
44	FW	(Croatia)	Ivan Perišić	5	0	0	0	0	0	2	0	0	0	0	0	7	0	0
Totals				71	2	1	6	0	0	15	0	0	12	0	0	105	2	1

Last updated: 26 May 2019
