= Adama Fofana =

Adama Fofana may refer to:

- Adama Fofana (footballer, born 1989), Ivorian footballer, forward
- Adama Fofana (footballer, born 1999), Burkinabé footballer, defender
- Adama Fofana (footballer, born 2001), Ivorian footballer, winger
