= Adamas =

Adamas may refer to:

- Adamas, Milos, a town in Greece
- Adamas (mythology), a character in the Iliad
- Adamas University, in Barasat, West Bengal, India
- Adamas Institute of Technology, in Barasat, West Bengal, India
- Adamas (sawfly), an insect genus in the sawfly family Tenthredinidae
- Adamas (TV series), a 2022 South Korean television series
- Adamas line of acoustic-electric guitars by Ovation Guitars
- "ADAMAS", a song by Japanese pop singer Lisa

== See also ==
- Adama (disambiguation)
