= Mahamadou Baldé =

Spanish footballer (born 2004)

Personal information
- Full name: Mahamadou Baldé Baldé
- Date of birth: 1 January 2004 (age 22)
- Place of birth: Barcelona, Spain
- Height: 1.83 m (6 ft 0 in)
- Position: Forward

Team information
- Current team: Muaither (on loan from Tenerife)

Youth career
- Damm
- 2014–2022: Cornellà

Senior career*
Years	Team	Apps	(Gls)
2022–2023	Nocerina	15	(5)
2023–2025	Lazio	0	(0)
2025–	Tenerife	19	(2)
2026–	→ Muaither (loan)	0	(0)
- * Club domestic league appearances and goals as of 9 June 2026

Mahamadou Baldé Baldé (born 1 January 2004) is a Spanish professional footballer who plays as a forward for Qatari club Muaither SC, on loan from Segunda División club Tenerife.

== Career ==
Born in Barcelona, Catalonia, Baldé is a youth product of the Spanish clubs CF Damm and UE Cornellà. He joined the Italian club Nocerina on 19 February 2022 where he debuted in the Serie D.

On 13 January 2023, Baldé signed with Lazio until 2026. Mainly a member of their Primavera squad, he made his senior and professional debut for Lazio as a late substitute in a 3–1 UEFA Europa League win over Real Sociedad on 23 January 2025.

On 11 July 2025, Baldé returned to his home country after signing a three-year contract with CD Tenerife in Primera Federación. On 24 August 2026, he was loaned to Qatari side Muaither SC for one year, with a buyout clause.

== Personal life ==
Born in Spain, Baldé is of Senegalese descent. He is the younger brother of the Senegal international footballer Keita Baldé and Serie C footballer Ibouraima Baldé.
