= Keita Baldé =

Footballer (born 1995)

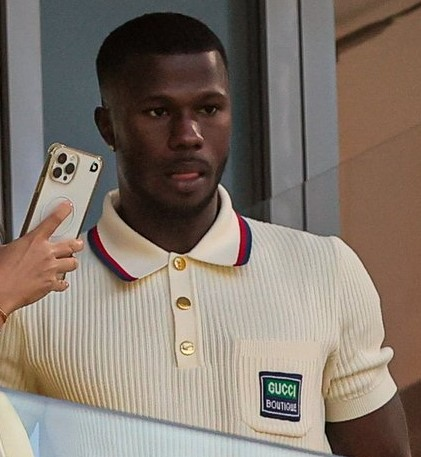
- Keita in 2022

Personal information
- Full name: Keita Baldé Diao
- Date of birth: 8 March 1995 (age 31)
- Place of birth: Arbúcies, Spain
- Height: 1.78 m (5 ft 10 in)
- Positions: Forward; winger

Team information
- Current team: Monza
- Number: 17

Youth career
- 2000–2005: Damm
- 2005–2011: Barcelona
- 2010–2012: → Cornellà (loan)
- 2012–2013: Lazio

Senior career*
Years	Team	Apps	(Gls)
2013–2017	Lazio	110	(26)
2017–2021	Monaco	44	(12)
2018–2019	→ Inter Milan (loan)	24	(5)
2020–2021	→ Sampdoria (loan)	25	(7)
2021–2022	Cagliari	26	(3)
2022–2024	Spartak Moscow	14	(3)
2023–2024	→ Espanyol (loan)	21	(0)
2024–2025	Sivasspor	11	(1)
2025–	Monza	32	(4)

International career^{‡}
2015	Senegal U20	7	(0)
2016–2022	Senegal	40	(6)
2015–	Catalonia	2	(0)
Medal record
Men's football
Representing Senegal
FIFA U-20 World Cup
Third place	2015 New Zealand
Africa Cup of Nations
Winner	2021 Cameroon
Runner-up	2019 Egypt
- * Club domestic league appearances and goals as of 12 May 2026 ‡ National team caps and goals as of 22:01, 28 May 2025 (UTC)

Keita Baldé Diao (born 8 March 1995) is a professional footballer who plays as a forward or winger for Serie A club Monza. Born in Spain, he plays for the Senegal national team.

== Club career ==
=== Early career ===
Born in Arbúcies, Girona, Catalonia, to Senegalese parents, Keita came up through the FC Barcelona's youth academy. In 2010, Keita travelled with the Barcelona youth team to Qatar for a tournament, where he played a practical joke by placing an ice-cube in a teammate's bed; As a punishment, Barcelona sent the 15-year-old Keita on loan to satellite club UE Cornellà, despite his reputation as a future prospect for the first team. The loan meant Cornellà held the rights to a fraction of Keita's playing rights. After a season in which he scored 47 goals for Cornellà's youth side, Keita turned down the chance to return to Barcelona, attracting the interest of Real Madrid and Manchester United.

=== Lazio ===
In the summer of 2011, Keita was signed by Serie A club Lazio for a €300,000 transfer fee, of which 10% went to Cornellà. Keita was unable to play official matches for Lazio's youth sides for a year, as he had to wait to be granted Spanish citizenship and the EU passport required for the Italian club to register him. However, he impressed while playing in the Torneo Karol Wojtyla youth competition, where he scored six goals in just four matches.

Keita then spent the 2012–13 season playing with Lazio's Primavera youth side and training with the first team. He was selected by head coach Vladimir Petković to sit on the bench for some matches in the latter part of the season but did not make his senior debut.

Promoted to the first team for the following season, Keita made his league debut in a 3–0 home win against Chievo at the Stadio Olimpico on 15 September 2013, coming on as a late substitute for Luis Pedro Cavanda. Five days later, Keita made his debut in the Europa League group stage match against Legia Warsaw, starting and providing the match's only goal scored by Hernanes. On 10 November 2013, he scored his first senior goal in a 1–1 draw against Parma.

On 18 August 2015, Keita came off the bench to score the only goal of the game as Lazio beat Bayer Leverkusen 1–0 in the first leg of their Champions League play-off at the Stadio Olimpico.

Keita fully established himself in the starting lineup in the 2016–17 season, scoring his first goal of the season in Serie A matchday 6 against Empoli at home. On 6 March of the following year, Keita made his 100th Serie A appearance in the 2–0 win at Bologna. Later on 23 April, Keita scored his maiden hat-trick, contributing in Lazio's 6–2 thrashing of Palermo, taking his tally up to 11 goals, reaching double figures for the first time in his career. He completed the hat-trick in five minutes, making it the fastest hat-trick scored in Serie A since 1974–75 season. One week later, in the Derby della Capitale against Roma for the matchday 34, Keita scored a brace, as Lazio won 3–1, the first win in the league against them since November 2012. He also become the first Lazio player to score a brace in the derby since Roberto Mancini in 1998–99 season.

=== Monaco ===
On 29 August 2017, Keita joined Monaco on a five-year contract for a reported €30 million transfer fee. He was assigned the number 14 shirt vacated by Tiémoué Bakayoko, who left for Chelsea earlier that summer. On 21 October 2017, Keita opened the scoring in the 2–0 Ligue 1 home win over Caen to register his first competitive Monaco goal after playing seven matches in all competitions for the club.

==== Loan to Inter Milan ====
On 13 August 2018, Keita signed for Inter Milan on loan of €6 million with a €30 million option to buy at the end of the season. He made his Serie A debut for the club on the first matchday of the 2018–19 season, in a loss to Sassuolo. On 24 November, he scored his first goals for the Nerazzurri; a brace in a 3–0 win over Frosinone. While not making many appearances, he found his way to the net again on 3 December in the away match against Roma, which ended 2–2. On 29 December, he scored the 1–0 winner over Empoli in the 72nd minute off a pass from Šime Vrsaljko. During the second half of the season he scored one goal, also against Empoli, on 26 May 2019, the opening goal in a 2–1 win for Inter Milan. At the end of the season, Baldé returned to Monaco as Inter did not trigger the buyout clause.

==== Loan to Sampdoria ====
On 29 September 2020, Keita joined Sampdoria on loan until 30 June 2021. On 23 December, after being sidelined for almost two months due to an injury, he scored his first goal for Sampdoria in his fourth appearance, in the 2–3 home defeat against Sassuolo, a game in which he was also sent off.

=== Cagliari ===
On 31 August 2021, Keita joined then-Serie A side Cagliari, where he played for one season.

=== Spartak Moscow ===
On 26 August 2022, Keita signed a three-year contract with Russian Premier League club Spartak Moscow. He made his debut on 4 September in a 1–2 loss to Zenit Saint Petersburg.

On 17 September 2022, it was announced that the Italian Anti-Doping Organization concluded an investigation into Baldé's actions from the time he was playing for Cagliari and banned him from playing until 5 December 2022 for violating testing procedures, despite no banned substances being found. Spartak announced it would comply with the decision taken in Italy.

On 4 April 2023, Baldé scored his first goal for Spartak in a 1–2 cup loss to Ural Yekaterinburg.

==== Loan to Espanyol ====
On 1 September 2023, Keita was moved to Espanyol back in his home country on loan for the 2023–24 season.

==== Release by Spartak ====
On 6 July 2024, Baldé's contract with Spartak was terminated by mutual consent.

=== Sivasspor ===
On 13 August 2024, Baldé signed a two-year contract with Sivasspor in Turkey.

=== Monza ===
On 13 February 2025, Baldé signed a contract with Serie A club Monza until the remainder of the 2024–25 season.

== International career ==
Keita was born in Spain to Senegalese parents. Although he was eligible to play for Spain, he chose to play for his parents' country, Senegal, being called up by their manager, Aliou Cissé, for the match against Niger for 2017 Africa Cup of Nations qualification Group K. He made his debut for Senegal on 26 March 2016, in a 2–0 win over Niger as a late substitute. He also played a friendly match with the Catalonia national team in December 2015 against Basque Country.

In May 2018, Keita was named in Senegal's 23-man squad for the 2018 FIFA World Cup in Russia.

He was part of Senegal's squad for the 2021 Africa Cup of Nations; the Lions of Teranga went on to win the tournament for the first time in their history.

== Personal life ==
His younger brothers Ibourahima and Mahamadou Baldé are also footballers.

As a child, Keita supported Inter Milan and has credited Samuel Eto'o for being his childhood idol.

He was appointed a Grand Officer of the National Order of the Lion by President of Senegal Macky Sall following the nation's victory at the 2021 Africa Cup of Nations.

== Career statistics ==
=== Club ===
As of match played 24 May 2025

Appearances and goals by club, season and competition
Club	Season	League			National cup (Note: Includes Coppa Italia, Coupe de France, Russian Cup)		League cup (Note: Includes Coupe de la Ligue)		Europe		Other		Total	
Club	Season	Division	Apps	Goals	Apps	Goals	Apps	Goals	Apps	Goals	Apps	Goals	Apps	Goals
Lazio	2013–14	Serie A	25	5	2	0	—		8 (Note: Appearances in UEFA Europa League)	1	—		35	6
Lazio	2014–15	Serie A	23	1	6	3	—		—		—		29	4
Lazio	2015–16	Serie A	31	4	1	0	—		6	1	1 (Note: Appearance in Supercoppa Italiana)	0	39	5
Lazio	2016–17	Serie A	31	16	3	0	—		—		—		34	16
Lazio	Total		110	26	12	3	—		14	2	1	0	137	31
Monaco	2017–18	Ligue 1	23	8	2	0	2	0	6 (Note: Appearances in UEFA Champions League)	0	—		33	8
Monaco	2019–20	Ligue 1	21	4	3	4	2	0	0	0	—		26	8
Monaco	Total		44	12	5	4	4	0	6	0	0	0	59	16
Inter Milan (loan)	2018–19	Serie A	24	5	0	0	—		5	0	—		29	5
Sampdoria (loan)	2020–21	Serie A	25	7	1	0	—		—		—		26	7
Cagliari	2021–22	Serie A	26	3	0	0	—		—		—		26	3
Spartak Moscow	2022–23	Russian Premier League	12	3	4	1	—		—		—		16	4
Spartak Moscow	2023–24	Russian Premier League	2	0	1	0	—		—		—		3	0
Spartak Moscow	Total		14	3	5	1	—		0	0	0	0	19	4
Espanyol	2023–24	Segunda División	22	0	2	0	—		—		—		24	0
Sivasspor	2024–25	Süper Lig	11	1	0	0	—		—		—		11	1
Monza	2024–25	Serie A	11	2	—		—		—		—		11	2
Career total			290	59	25	8	4	0	25	2	1	0	345	71

=== International ===
As of match played 7 June 2022

Appearances and goals by national team and year
National team	Year	Apps	Goals
Senegal	2016	6	2
Senegal	2017	10	1
Senegal	2018	7	1
Senegal	2019	7	1
Senegal	2020	0	0
Senegal	2021	6	1
Senegal	2022	4	0
Total		40	6

Scores and results list Senegal's goal tally first, score column indicates score after each Keita goal.

List of international goals scored by Keita Baldé
No.	Date	Venue	Opponent	Score	Result	Competition
1.	3 September 2016	Stade Léopold Sédar Senghor, Dakar, Senegal	Namibia	1–0	2–0	2017 Africa Cup of Nations qualification
2.	8 October 2016	Stade Léopold Sédar Senghor, Dakar, Senegal	Cape Verde	1–0	2–0	2018 FIFA World Cup qualification
3.	11 January 2017	Stade Municipal de Kintélé, Brazzaville, Republic of Congo	Congo	1–0	2–0	Friendly
4.	9 September 2018	Mahamasina Municipal Stadium, Antananarivo, Madagascar	Madagascar	2–1	2–2	2019 Africa Cup of Nations qualification
5.	23 June 2019	30 June Stadium, Cairo, Egypt	Tanzania	1–0	2–0	2019 Africa Cup of Nations
6.	9 October 2021	Stade Lat-Dior, Thiès, Senegal	Namibia	4–1	4–1	2022 FIFA World Cup qualification

== Honours ==
Lazio

- Coppa Italia runner-up: 2014–15, 2016–17
- Supercoppa Italiana runner-up: 2015

Monaco

- Coupe de la Ligue runner-up: 2017–18
- Trophée des Champions runner-up: 2017

Cagliari

- Trofeo Sardegna: 2021

Spartak Moscow

- Russian Super Cup runner-up: 2022

Senegal

- Africa Cup of Nations: 2021; runner-up 2019

Individual

- Serie A Goal of the Month: November 2021

Orders

- Grand Officer of the National Order of the Lion: 2022
