= Alessandro Capello =

Italian footballer (born 1995)

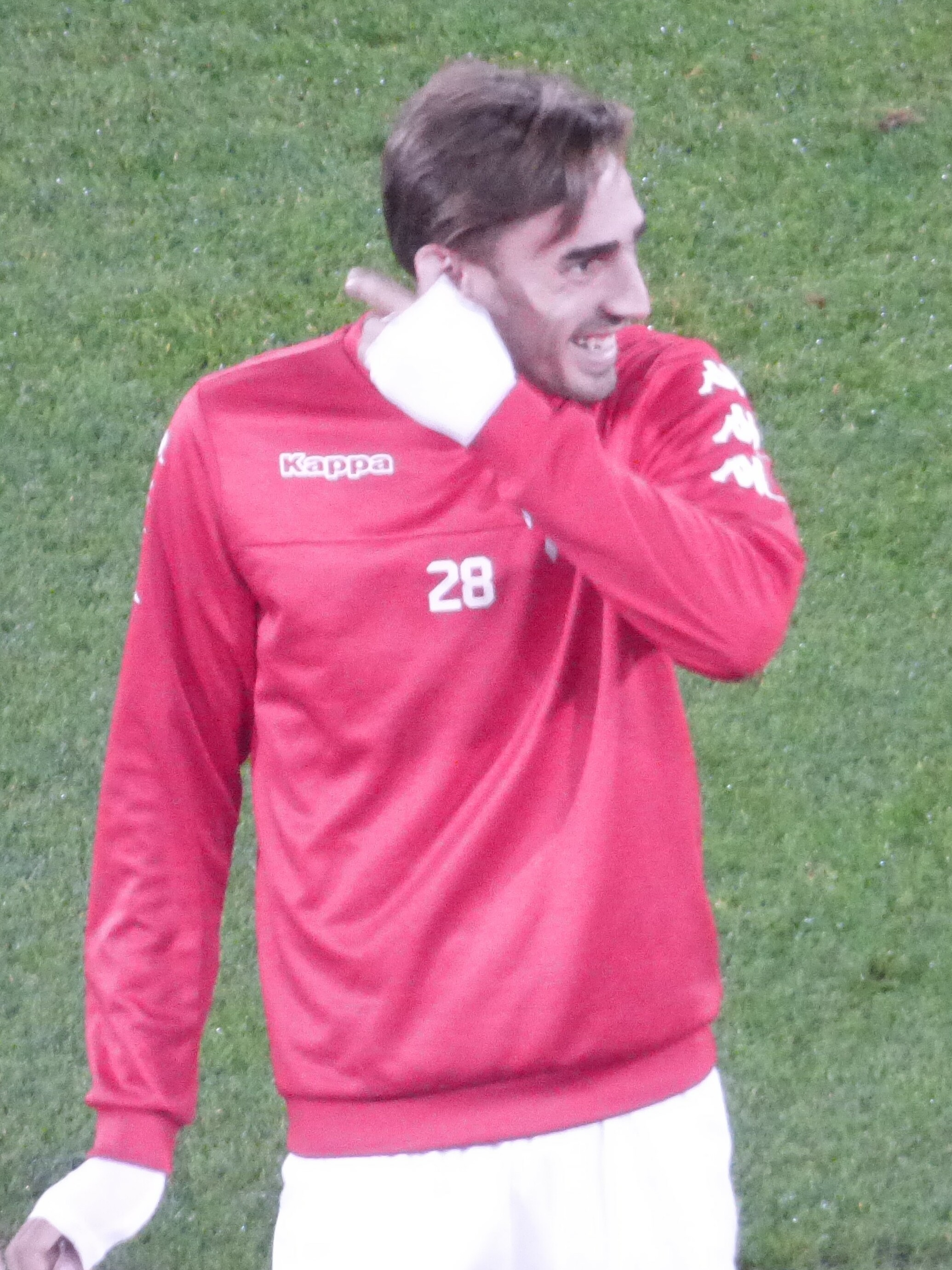
- Capello in 2018

Personal information
- Date of birth: 12 December 1995 (age 30)
- Place of birth: Bologna, Italy
- Height: 1.83 m (6 ft 0 in)
- Position: Forward

Team information
- Current team: Lecco (on loan from Arezzo)
- Number: 10

Youth career
- 2012–2013: Bologna
- 2013–2014: Inter

Senior career*
Years	Team	Apps	(Gls)
2012–2013	Bologna	1	(0)
2013–2014	Inter	0	(0)
2014–2019	Cagliari	0	(0)
2015	→ Varese (loan)	4	(0)
2015–2016	→ Prato (loan)	30	(11)
2016–2017	→ Olbia (loan)	34	(8)
2017–2019	→ Padova (loan)	65	(21)
2019–2021	Venezia	52	(7)
2021–2022	Virtus Entella	36	(2)
2022–2025	Carrarese	81	(22)
2025–	Arezzo	14	(0)
2025–2026	→ Vicenza (loan)	33	(4)
2026–	→ Lecco (loan)	3	(0)

International career
2011–2012	Italy U17	7	(0)
2012	Italy U18	1	(0)
2013	Italy U19	2	(0)
- * Club domestic league appearances and goals as of 26 September 2026

Alessandro Capello (born 12 December 1995) is an Italian professional footballer who plays as a forward for Serie C Group A club Lecco, on loan from Arezzo.

Having begun his career at Bologna, he then moved to Cagliari and gained experience with a loan to Varese. Capello has represented Italy at youth international levels up to the under-19 team.

== Club career ==
=== Bologna ===
Born in Bologna, Capello began his career at hometown club Bologna F.C. 1909. He made his debut on 28 November 2012 in the fourth round of the Coppa Italia, a 1–0 win over Livorno at the Stadio Renato Dall'Ara, replacing Luca Veratti for the final 14 minutes of the game. Aged 16, it was his only appearance for the club.

=== Inter ===
In June 2013, Inter Milan bought half the player's rights from Bologna (a co-ownership deal with Bologna), for €2.5 million (50% registration rights of Andrea Bandini and Andrea Romanò, plus €200,000 cash). In his only season with the Inter Primavera Youth side, he made 26 appearances in all competitions, scoring 8 goals between Primavera League, Coppa Italia and Torneo di Viareggio matches. Bologna and Inter bought back all their player's rights in June 2014 for the original price.

=== Cagliari ===
On 2 July 2014, Capello moved to Cagliari for €4 million from Bologna (€1 million cash plus defender Marios Oikonomou). Having been an unused substitute in 14 Serie A matches and one cup match, he made his debut for the Sardinian club on 14 January 2015 in the last 16 of the season's cup, a 2–1 loss at Parma. He was substituted after 56 minutes for Marco Sau, who scored Cagliari's goal.

Capello was loaned to Serie B club Varese for the remainder of the season on 2 February 2015. More often an unused substitute, he made four appearances for the team from Lombardy, of which only one was a start: a 1–0 defeat at Crotone on 10 May, in which he was replaced by Luca Miracoli with 15 minutes remaining.

On 31 August 2015, Capello left for Lega Pro club Prato in a temporary deal. Capello's number 16 shirt was also taken by youngster Davide Arras.

On 25 July 2016, Capello was signed by Olbia. The club also signed some youth products from Cagliari.

On 12 July 2017, Capello joined Padova on loan.

=== Venezia ===
On 21 July 2019, Capello signed to Venezia on a 2-year contract.

=== Virtus Entella ===
On 19 January 2021, Capello signed with Serie B side, Virtus Entella.

=== Carrarese ===
On 1 September 2022, Capello moved to Carrarese on a two-year deal.

=== Arezzo ===
On 17 January 2025, Capello signed with Arezzo.

== International career ==
Capello made his international debut for Italy under-17 in a 1–0 defeat away to Israel on 14 September 2011. He earned seven caps in total for that category, and went on to earn one for the under-18 team and two for the under-19 team in the following years.

== Style of play ==
Described as a promising forward, Capello is capable of playing anywhere along the front-line, and has been used both as a striker, and as a winger. His main attributes are his technique, dribbling skills, and his striking ability from outside the area.
