= List of ambassadors of Ivory Coast to China =

Coordinates: 39.942783°N 116.450983°E

Ambassador of Ivory Coast to China
- Incumbent; Adama Dosso since August 2014
- Inaugural holder: Amoikon Tiémélé
- Formation: June 5, 1984

The Ivorian ambassador in Beijing is the official representative of the Government in Abidjan to the Government of the People's Republic of China.

== List of representatives ==
Diplomatic agrément/Diplomatic accreditation	Ambassador	Observations	List of heads of state of Ivory Coast	List of premiers of China	Term end
1983		The governments in Beijing and Abidjan established diplomatic relations.	Félix Houphouët-Boigny	Zhao Ziyang	
June 5, 1984	Amoikon Tiémélé	Edjampan Boa PDCI-RDA Vice-President Amoikon Tiémélé, Former Minister of Commerce, former ambassador, current vice-president of PDCI-RDA, Chairman of the Council and member of Abengourou, Mr. Boa Amoikon Tiémélé Edjampan is part of the so-called "personalities" Of the party of the sixties.	Félix Houphouët-Boigny	Zhao Ziyang	1991
1991	Anet Nanan Koliabo		Félix Houphouët-Boigny	Li Peng	1993
1993	Anoh Patrice		Henri Konan Bédié	Li Peng	1997
1997	Konan Kramo		Henri Konan Bédié, Laurent Gbagbo	Li Peng	2006
2006	Alain Nicaise Papatchi Coffie	(* January 27, 2014 in Paris)	Laurent Gbagbo	Wen Jiabao	2014
August 2014	Adama Dosso		Alassane Dramane Ouattara	Li Keqiang	
