= 2004 Coppa Italia final =

56th Coppa Italia final
- Event: 2003–04 Coppa Italia
Lazio	Juventus
4	2

First leg
Lazio	Juventus
2	0
- Date: 17 March 2004
- Venue: Stadio Olimpico, Rome
- Referee: Pierluigi Collina
- Attendance: 62,204
- Weather: Fog; 11 °C (52 °F)

Second leg
Juventus	Lazio
2	2
- Date: 12 May 2004
- Venue: Stadio Olimpico di Torino, Turin
- Referee: Gianluca Paparesta
- Attendance: 38,849
- Weather: Mostly cloudy 15 °C (59 °F)

The 2004 Coppa Italia final was the final of the 2003–04 Coppa Italia, the top cup competition in Italian football. The match was played over two legs between Lazio and Juventus. This was the 13th Coppa Italia final appearance by Juventus and the 5th by Lazio. It was the first meeting of these two clubs in the finals. The first leg was played in Rome on 17 March 2004, in which Lazio won 2–0. The second leg was played on 12 May 2004 in Turin and the two clubs drew 2–2, giving Lazio their 4th title on an aggregate result of 4–2.

== First leg ==
17 March 2004
21:00

Lazio	2–0	Juventus
Fiore 59', 80'

Stadio Olimpico, Rome
Attendance: 62,204
Referee: Pierluigi Collina

Lazio	Juventus

GK	33	(Italy) Matteo Sereni
RB	22	(Italy) Massimo Oddo
CB	31	(Netherlands) Jaap Stam
CB	24	(Portugal) Fernando Couto
LB	19	(Italy) Giuseppe Favalli (c)
RM	14	(Italy) Stefano Fiore
CM	16	(Italy) Giuliano Giannichedda
CM	20	(Italy) Fabio Liverani		(substituted off) 81'
LM	8	(Brazil) César		(substituted off) 89'
CF	9	(Italy) Bernardo Corradi
CF	18	(Italy) Roberto Muzzi		(substituted off) 46'
Substitutes:
GK	1	(Italy) Angelo Peruzzi
DF	2	(Italy) Francesco Colonnese
DF	5	(Italy) Luciano Zauri		(substituted on) 89'
DF	11	(Serbia and Montenegro) Siniša Mihajlović
MF	4	(Italy) Demetrio Albertini
MF	6	(France) Ousmane Dabo		(substituted on) 81'
FW	21	(Italy) Simone Inzaghi	Booked	(substituted on) 46'
Manager:
(Italy) Roberto Mancini

GK	12	(Italy) Antonio Chimenti	Booked
RB	21	(France) Lilian Thuram
CB	5	(Croatia) Igor Tudor	(red card) 82'
CB	23	(Italy) Nicola Legrottaglie
LB	7	(Italy) Gianluca Pessotto
RM	13	(Italy) Mauro Camoranesi		(substituted off) 84'
CM	3	(Italy) Alessio Tacchinardi
CM	8	(Italy) Antonio Conte (c)		(substituted off) 74'
CM	18	(Ghana) Stephen Appiah
LM	11	(Czech Republic) Pavel Nedvěd	Booked
CF	20	(Italy) Marco Di Vaio		(substituted off) 76'
Substitutes:
GK	1	(Italy) Gianluigi Buffon
DF	31	(Italy) Orlando Urbano
DF	42	(Italy) Giovanni Bartolucci		(substituted on) 84'
MF	14	(Italy) Enzo Maresca		(substituted on) 74'
MF	32	(Russia) Viktor Budjanskij
MF	37	(Italy) Davide Chiumento
FW	45	(Italy) Raffaele Palladino		(substituted on) 76'
Manager:
Marcello Lippi

== Second leg ==
12 May 2004
21:00

Juventus	2–2	Lazio
Trezeguet 20'; Del Piero 46'		Corradi 69'; Fiore 86'

Stadio delle Alpi, Turin
Attendance: 38,849
Referee: Gianluca Paparesta

Juventus	Lazio

GK	12	(Italy) Antonio Chimenti
RWB	15	(Italy) Alessandro Birindelli	Booked
CB	2	(Italy) Ciro Ferrara
CB	21	(France) Lilian Thuram
CB	23	(Italy) Nicola Legrottaglie
LWB	7	(Italy) Gianluca Pessotto		(substituted off) 46'
RM	19	(Italy) Gianluca Zambrotta
CM	14	(Italy) Enzo Maresca		(substituted off) 75'
LM	11	(Czech Republic) Pavel Nedvěd
RF	17	(France) David Trezeguet
LF	10	(Italy) Alessandro Del Piero (c)		(substituted off) 78'
Substitutes:
GK	1	(Italy) Gianluigi Buffon
RB	13	(Italy) Mark Iuliano
CM	18	(Ghana) Stephen Appiah		(substituted on) 46'
MF	32	(Russia) Viktor Budjanskij
MF	37	(Italy) Davide Chiumento
FW	9	(Italy) Fabrizio Miccoli		(substituted on) 78'
FW	20	(Italy) Marco Di Vaio		(substituted on) 75'
Manager:
(Italy) Marcello Lippi

GK	33	(Italy) Matteo Sereni
RB	22	(Italy) Massimo Oddo
CB	31	(Netherlands) Jaap Stam
CB	11	(Serbia and Montenegro) Siniša Mihajlović
LB	19	(Italy) Giuseppe Favalli (c)	Booked
RM	14	(Italy) Stefano Fiore
CM	16	(Italy) Giuliano Giannichedda	Booked
CM	20	(Italy) Fabio Liverani		(substituted off) 75'
LM	8	(Brazil) César
CF	9	(Italy) Bernardo Corradi		(substituted off) 87'
CF	18	(Italy) Roberto Muzzi		(substituted off) 61'
Substitutes:
GK	1	(Italy) Angelo Peruzzi
DF	5	(Italy) Luciano Zauri
DF	23	(Italy) Paolo Negro		(substituted on) 87'
DF	24	(Portugal) Fernando Couto
MF	4	(Italy) Demetrio Albertini		(substituted on) 75'
FW	7	(Argentina) Claudio López
FW	21	(Italy) Simone Inzaghi		(substituted on) 61'
Manager:
(Italy) Roberto Mancini

== See also ==
- 2003–04 Juventus FC season
- 2003–04 SS Lazio season

Played between same clubs:

- 2015 Coppa Italia final
- 2017 Coppa Italia final
