= Andrea Romanò =

Italian footballer (born 1993)

Personal information
- Date of birth: 23 July 1993 (age 33)
- Place of birth: Como, Italy
- Height: 1.83 m (6 ft 0 in)
- Position: Midfielder

Youth career
- 2005–2013: Internazionale

Senior career*
Years	Team	Apps	(Gls)
2012–2013	Internazionale	1	(0)
2013	→ Prato (loan)	6	(0)
2013–2014	Bologna	0	(0)
2013–2014	→ Crotone (loan)	0	(0)
2014–2019	Internazionale	0	(0)
2014–2015	→ Prato (loan)	37	(2)
2015–2016	→ Renate (loan)	11	(0)
2016–2017	→ Reggina (loan)	15	(0)
2017–2018	→ Monza (loan)	3	(0)
2018	→ Cuneo (loan)	8	(0)
2019	→ Südtirol (loan)	3	(0)

International career
2010–2011	Italy U16	6	(2)
2011	Italy U17	2	(0)
2011	Italy U18	0	(0)
2012	Italy U19	3	(0)
- * Club domestic league appearances and goals as of 22:10, 16 May 2019 (UTC)

Andrea Romanò (born 23 July 1993) is an Italian footballer who plays as a midfielder.

== Career ==
Romanò made his debut for Internazionale in the Europa League on 22 November 2012 against FC Rubin Kazan. In January 2013 he joined A.C. Prato on temporary base.

In June 2013 Romanò and Andrea Bandini were part of the deal that Alessandro Capello went to Inter. On 5 July Romanò was loaned out to Serie B side Crotone for the 2013–14 season. In January 2014 Romanò returned to Prato. In June 2014 Romanò, Bandini and Capello were sold back to their mother clubs. Romanò signed a new 4-year contract.

In July 2014 Romanò returned to Prato once again along with Roberto Ogunseye, Adama Fofana and Gianmarco Gabbianelli.

On 24 July 2015, Romanò was signed by A.C. Renate in another temporary deal.

On 31 August 2016, Romanò left for Reggina. On 13 July 2017 he left for Monza.

On 30 August 2018, Romanò was loaned to Serie C side Cuneo on a season-long loan deal.

On 31 January 2019, Romanò was loaned to Südtirol until the end of season.

== Honours ==
Inter Primavera

- NextGen series (1): 2011–12
- League Champion (1): 2011–12
