= 2015 Coppa Italia final =

67th Coppa Italia final
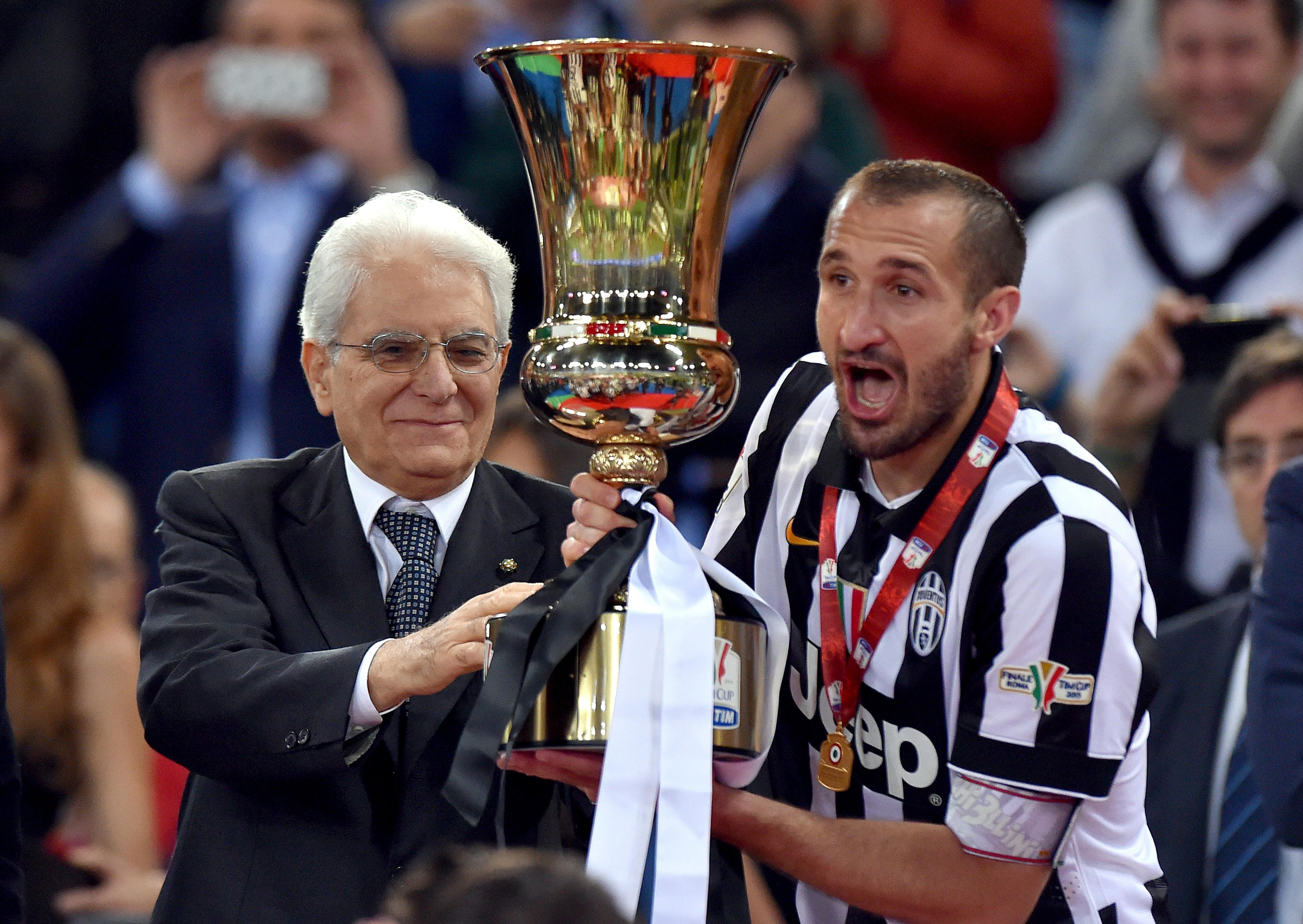
- Giorgio Chiellini (right) captained Juventus for the final and raised the trophy; he had previously scored their equaliser.
- Event: 2014–15 Coppa Italia
Juventus	Lazio
2	1
- After extra time
- Date: 20 May 2015
- Venue: Stadio Olimpico, Rome
- Referee: Daniele Orsato
- Attendance: 60,000

The 2015 Coppa Italia final decided the winner of the 2014–15 Coppa Italia, Italy's main football cup. It was played on 20 May 2015 at the Stadio Olimpico in Rome, between Juventus and Lazio. Juventus won 2–1 after extra time for a record tenth title.

As Juventus won the 2014–15 Serie A, Lazio qualified automatically as the cup representative in the 2015 Supercoppa Italiana.

== Background ==
Juventus played a 15th final, second only to Roma's 17. They had won nine, a joint record with Roma. Their most recent final was in 2012, losing 0–2 to Napoli, and their last victory was in 1995, defeating Parma 3–0 on aggregate. It was Lazio's eighth, of which they had won six, most recently a 1–0 win in 2013 against Roma. Juventus and Lazio contested the 2004 final, which Lazio won 4–2 on aggregate.

== Road to the final ==
Juventus		Round	Lazio
Opponent	Result	2014–15 Coppa Italia	Opponent	Result
N/A	N/A	Third round	Bassano Virtus	7–0
N/A	N/A	Fourth round	Varese	3–0
Hellas Verona	6–1	Round of 16	Torino	3–1
Parma	1–0	Quarter-finals	Milan	1–0
Fiorentina	1–2 (H), 3–0 (A) (4–2 agg.)	Semi-finals	Napoli	1–1 (H), 1–0 (A) (2–1 agg.)

=== Juventus ===
Juventus, of Serie A, began the competition in the last 16, hosting fellow top-flight team Hellas Verona at Juventus Stadium on 15 January 2015. Sebastian Giovinco scored twice in addition to Roberto Pereyra's first Juventus goal for a 3–0 lead at half-time. After Paul Pogba extended Juventus' lead, Nenê scored a consolation goal for Verona. Rafael Márquez fouled Giovinco for a penalty which Álvaro Morata converted, and 18-year-old substitute Kingsley Coman scored his first Juventus goal to conclude a 6–1 victory.

In the quarter-finals 13 days later, Juventus played Parma away, winning with a goal by substitute Morata in the 89th minute.

On 5 March, Juventus began their two-legged semi-final against the last season's finalists Fiorentina. In the home match, Mohamed Salah gave the visitors the lead, but Fernando Llorente equalized before half-time. Salah then scored a second to win the match. In the second leg on 7 April, Juventus travelled to the Stadio Artemio Franchi and won 3–0 to triumph 4–2 on aggregate. Alessandro Matri, Pereyra and Leonardo Bonucci scored, but Morata was sent off with two minutes remaining for a poor challenge on Alessandro Diamanti.

=== Lazio ===
Lazio, also of Serie A, began in the third round with a home match against Lega Pro team Bassano Virtus on 24 August 2014. They won 7–0 with goals by Antonio Candreva, Keita (2), Stefan de Vrij, Marco Parolo, Dušan Basta and Miroslav Klose. They hosted Serie B club Varese in the fourth round on 2 December, winning 3–0; an own goal by on-loan defender Stefan Šimić was followed two minutes later by Filip Đorđević, with Felipe Anderson scoring a late third.

In the last 16 on 14 January 2015, Lazio travelled to the Stadio Olimpico to face their first top-flight opponent of the campaign, Torino. Keita and Klose put them ahead before half time, with Josef Martínez scoring four minutes into the second half. Torino goalkeeper Daniele Padelli was sent off for fouling Klose for a penalty, which Cristian Daniel Ledesma converted. Thirteen days later in the quarter-finals at the San Siro, Lazio defeated Milan 1–0 with a penalty by Lucas Biglia, awarded after Michelangelo Albertazzi handled his cross. Lorik Cana was sent off for Lazio shortly afterwards.

On 4 March, Lazio hosted holders Napoli in the first leg of the semi-final and led at half time after Felipe Anderson had set up a goal for Klose. Napoli equalised in the second half when Gonzalo Higuaín went around Lazio goalkeeper Etrit Berisha and provided a goal for Manolo Gabbiadini. In the second leg on 8 April, substitute Senad Lulić scored in the 79th minute to win the tie 2–1 on aggregate from a low cross by Felipe Anderson. In the final moments of the match, Lulić slid to clear a sure goal off the goal-line from Napoli's Lorenzo Insigne.

== Match ==
=== Date change ===
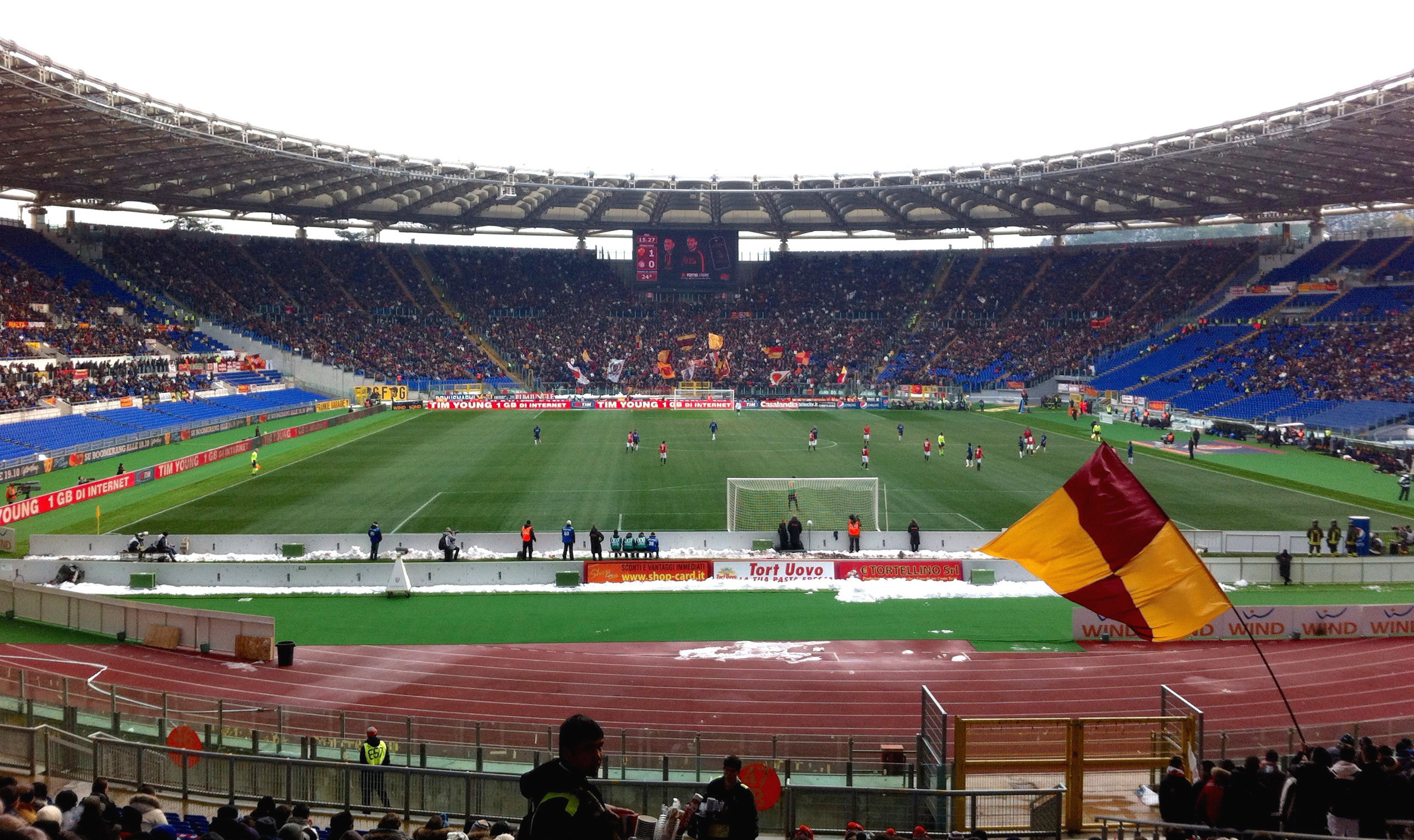
The Stadio Olimpico in Rome held the final

The 2015 Coppa Italia Final was originally scheduled to be played on 7 June, however with the qualification of Juventus to the 2015 UEFA Champions League Final on 6 June, the date was changed to 20 May.

=== Team selection ===
Juventus were without forward Álvaro Morata, who was sent off in the second leg of the semi-final, as well as midfielder Claudio Marchisio, who was given a yellow card in that match. In Morata's absence, Fernando Llorente and Carlos Tevez started up front, and Giorgio Chiellini captained the team who were without regular goalkeeper Gianluigi Buffon, replaced by Marco Storari.

=== Summary ===
Lazio scored the first goal in the fourth minute, when defender Ștefan Radu headed in a free kick by Danilo Cataldi. Juventus equalised seven minutes later: Andrea Pirlo sent in a free kick which Patrice Evra headed down to Chiellini six yards from goal, and the captain scored past Etrit Berisha. There were chances for both teams in the remainder of the first half: Llorente missed a header from Evra's cross and Storari saved from Cataldi who had been set up by Felipe Anderson. Marco Parolo hit a 25-yard shot wide of the target.

Early in the second half, Berisha saved when Llorente had an opportunity to score. For Juventus, Tevez set up Paul Pogba, but his shot was blocked. Lazio missed from long range, another Parolo strike and a free kick by Santiago Gentiletti. Shortly after he came on in place of Miroslav Klose, Lazio forward Filip Đorđević had an attempt saved by Storari, and the Juventus substitute Alessandro Matri had a goal disallowed for offside. Đorđević had another opportunity before the end of regulation time, striking both goalposts. In the first half of extra time, Matri scored past Berisha from ten yards, the eventual winner.

=== Details ===
20 May 2015
20:45 CEST (UTC+2)

Juventus	2–1 (a.e.t.)	Lazio
Chiellini 11'; Matri 97'	Report	Radu 4'

Stadio Olimpico, Rome
Attendance: 60,000
Referee: Daniele Orsato

Juventus	Lazio

GK	30	(Italy) Marco Storari
CB	15	(Italy) Andrea Barzagli
CB	19	(Italy) Leonardo Bonucci	(yellow card) 64'
CB	3	(Italy) Giorgio Chiellini (c)
RWB	26	(Switzerland) Stephan Lichtsteiner		(substituted off) 115'
DM	21	(Italy) Andrea Pirlo
CM	23	(Chile) Arturo Vidal
CM	6	(France) Paul Pogba		(substituted off) 78'
LWB	33	(France) Patrice Evra	(yellow card) 60'
CF	14	(Spain) Fernando Llorente		(substituted off) 84'
CF	10	(Argentina) Carlos Tevez
Substitutes:
GK	1	(Italy) Gianluigi Buffon
DF	5	(Italy) Angelo Ogbonna
DF	7	(Italy) Simone Pepe
FW	11	(France) Kingsley Coman
DF	17	(Italy) Paolo De Ceglie
MF	20	(Italy) Simone Padoin		(substituted on) 115'
MF	22	(Ghana) Kwadwo Asamoah
MF	27	(Italy) Stefano Sturaro
FW	32	(Italy) Alessandro Matri	(yellow card) 97'	(substituted on) 84'
GK	34	(Brazil) Rubinho
MF	37	(Argentina) Roberto Pereyra		(substituted on) 78'
MF	39	(Italy) Luca Marrone
Manager:
(Italy) Massimiliano Allegri

GK	1	(Albania) Etrit Berisha
CB	3	(Netherlands) Stefan de Vrij		(substituted off) 105'
CB	18	(Argentina) Santiago Gentiletti
CB	26	(Romania) Ștefan Radu (c)		(substituted off) 71'
RM	8	(Serbia) Dušan Basta
CM	16	(Italy) Marco Parolo	(yellow card) 18'
CM	32	(Italy) Danilo Cataldi
LM	19	(Bosnia and Herzegovina) Senad Lulić
RW	87	(Italy) Antonio Candreva	(yellow card) 108'
CF	11	(Germany) Miroslav Klose		(substituted off) 83'
LW	7	(Brazil) Felipe Anderson
Substitutes:
DF	2	(France) Michaël Ciani
DF	5	(Netherlands) Edson Braafheid
MF	6	(Italy) Stefano Mauri
FW	9	(Serbia) Filip Đorđević		(substituted on) 83'
FW	14	(Spain) Keita		(substituted on) 105'
GK	22	(Italy) Federico Marchetti
MF	23	(Nigeria) Ogenyi Onazi
MF	24	(Italy) Cristian Ledesma
DF	33	(Brazil) Maurício		(substituted on) 71'
DF	39	(Belgium) Luis Pedro Cavanda
GK	77	(Albania) Thomas Strakosha
DF	85	(Argentina) Diego Novaretti
Manager:
(Italy) Stefano Pioli

== See also ==
- 2014–15 Juventus FC season
- 2014–15 SS Lazio season

Played between same clubs:

- 2004 Coppa Italia final
- 2017 Coppa Italia final
