= 2017 Coppa Italia final =

69th Coppa Italia final
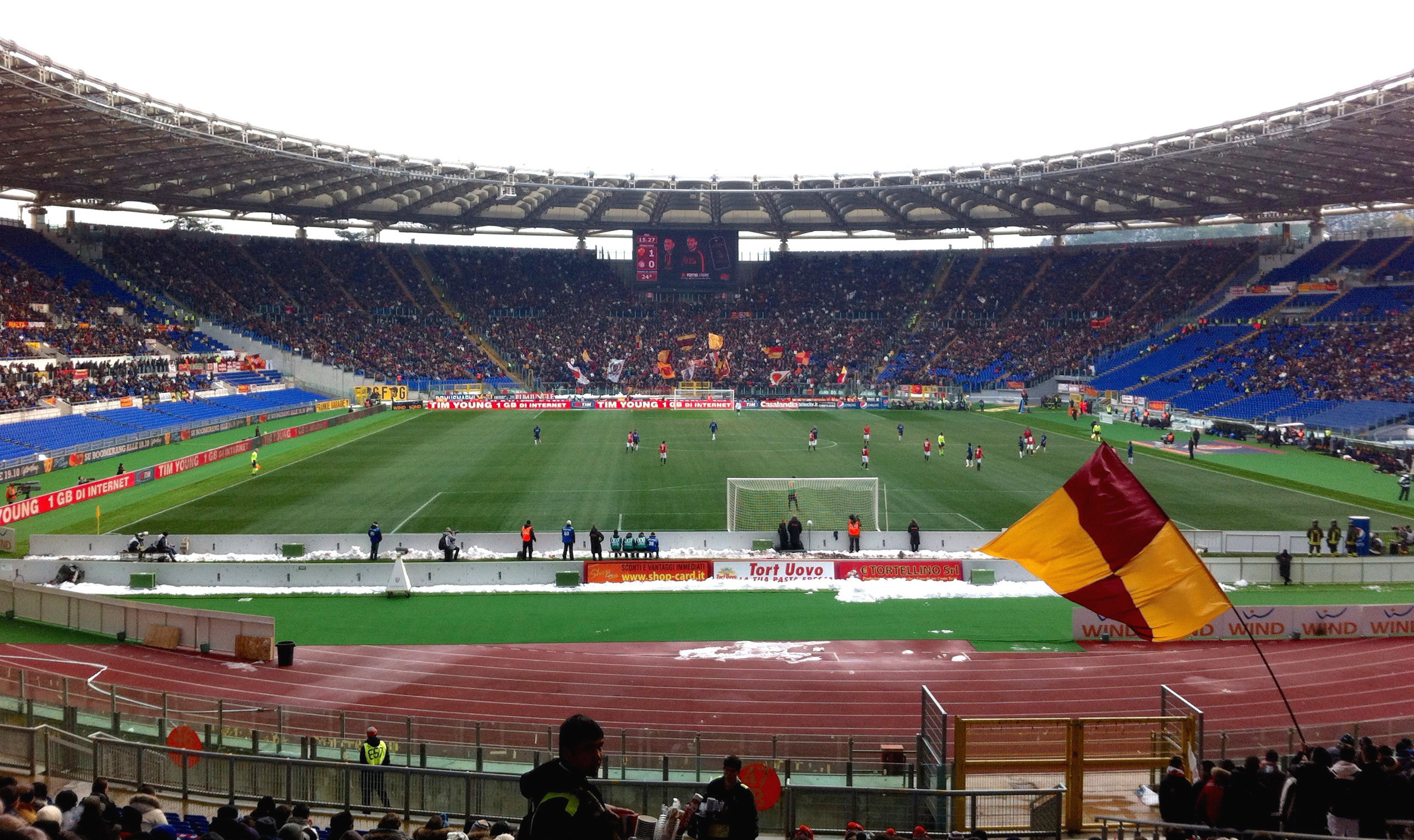
- The Stadio Olimpico in Rome held the final
- Event: 2016–17 Coppa Italia
| Juventus | Lazio |
| 2 | 0 |
- Date: 17 May 2017
- Venue: Stadio Olimpico, Rome
- Referee: Paolo Tagliavento
- Attendance: 64,098

The 2017 Coppa Italia final decided the winner of the 2016–17 Coppa Italia, Italy's main football cup. It was played on 17 May 2017 at the Stadio Olimpico in Rome between Juventus and Lazio.

Juventus won the match 2–0 with two first-half goals from Dani Alves and Leonardo Bonucci, winning their third consecutive Coppa Italia title and 12th title overall.

== Road to the final ==
Note: In all results below, the score of the finalist is given first (H: home; A: away).

| Juventus | | Round | Lazio |
|---|---|---|---|---|
| Opponent | Result | 2016–17 Coppa Italia | Opponent | Result |
| Atalanta | 3–2 (H) | Round of 16 | Genoa | 4–2 (H) |
| Milan | 2–1 (H) | Quarter-finals | Internazionale | 2–1 (A) |
| Napoli | 3–1 (H), 2–3 (A) (5–4 agg.) | Semi-finals | Roma | 2–0 (H), 2–3 (A) (4–3 agg.) |

== Match ==
=== Date change ===
The 2017 Coppa Italia Final was originally scheduled to be played on 2 June, however with the qualification of Juventus to the 2017 UEFA Champions League Final on 3 June, the date was changed to 17 May.

=== Summary ===
Dani Alves opened the scoring for Juventus after 12 minutes with a right foot volley from eight yards out after a cross from the left by Alex Sandro. Leonardo Bonucci got the second when he tapped in from close range after a corner from the left from Paulo Dybala was deflected into his path.

=== Details ===
17 May 2017
21:00 CEST (UTC+2)

| Juventus | 2–0 | Lazio |
|---|---|---|
| Dani Alves 12'; Bonucci 24' | Report |

Stadio Olimpico, Rome
Attendance: 64,098
Referee: Paolo Tagliavento

| Juventus | Lazio |

| GK | 25 | (Brazil) Neto |
| CB | 15 | (Italy) Andrea Barzagli |
| CB | 19 | (Italy) Leonardo Bonucci |
| CB | 3 | (Italy) Giorgio Chiellini (c) |
| RM | 23 | (Brazil) Dani Alves | (yellow card) 86' |
| CM | 8 | (Italy) Claudio Marchisio |
| CM | 28 | (Venezuela) Tomás Rincón |
| LM | 12 | (Brazil) Alex Sandro |
| AM | 21 | (Argentina) Paulo Dybala | | (substituted off) 78' |
| AM | 17 | (Croatia) Mario Mandžukić |
| CF | 9 | (Argentina) Gonzalo Higuaín |
Substitutes:
| GK | 1 | (Italy) Gianluigi Buffon |
| GK | 32 | (Italy) Emil Audero |
| DF | 4 | (Morocco) Medhi Benatia |
| FW | 7 | (Colombia) Juan Cuadrado |
| MF | 14 | (Italy) Federico Mattiello |
| MF | 18 | (Gabon) Mario Lemina | | (substituted in) 78' |
| MF | 22 | (Ghana) Kwadwo Asamoah |
| DF | 26 | (Switzerland) Stephan Lichtsteiner |
| MF | 27 | (Italy) Stefano Sturaro |
| FW | 34 | (Italy) Moise Kean |
| FW | 46 | (Algeria) Mehdi Léris |
Manager:
(Italy) Massimiliano Allegri

| GK | 1 | (Albania) Thomas Strakosha |
| CB | 13 | (Brazil) Wallace |
| CB | 3 | (Netherlands) Stefan de Vrij | (substituted off) 69' |
| CB | 15 | (Angola) Bastos | (substituted off) 53' |
| RM | 8 | (Serbia) Dušan Basta |
| CM | 16 | (Italy) Marco Parolo | (substituted off) 21' |
| CM | 20 | (Argentina) Lucas Biglia (c) |
| CM | 21 | (Serbia) Sergej Milinković-Savić |
| LM | 19 | (Bosnia and Herzegovina) Senad Lulić |
| CF | 17 | (Italy) Ciro Immobile |
| CF | 14 | (Senegal) Keita Baldé |
Substitutes:
| GK | 31 | (Lithuania) Marius Adamonis |
| GK | 55 | (Croatia) Ivan Vargić |
| DF | 2 | (Netherlands) Wesley Hoedt |
| DF | 4 | (Spain) Patric |
| FW | 9 | (Serbia) Filip Đorđević |
| MF | 10 | (Brazil) Felipe Anderson | (substituted in) 53' |
| FW | 11 | (Italy) Luca Crecco |
| MF | 18 | (Spain) Luis Alberto | (substituted in) 69' |
| FW | 25 | (Italy) Cristiano Lombardi |
| DF | 26 | (Romania) Ștefan Radu | (substituted in) 21' |
| FW | 71 | (Spain) Mamadou Tounkara |
| MF | 96 | (Italy) Alessandro Murgia |
Manager:
(Italy) Simone Inzaghi

Match rules

- 90 minutes.
- 30 minutes of extra time if necessary.
- Penalty shoot-out if scores still level.

== See also ==
- 2016-17 Juventus FC season
- 2016-17 SS Lazio season

Played between same clubs:

- 2004 Coppa Italia final
- 2015 Coppa Italia final
