= Adama Diakite =

Adama Diakité may refer to:

- Adama Diakité (footballer, born 1978), Malian footballer
- Adama Diakité (footballer, born 1991), French footballer
- Adama Diakité (footballer, born 1993), Ivorian footballer in Italy
