= Adama (disambiguation) =

Adama is a city in Ethiopia.

Adama may also refer to:

- Adama (name)
  - Commander Adama (original Battlestar Galactica), a character in the 1978–79 TV series Battlestar Galactica
  - William Adama, a character in the 2004–09 TV series Battlestar Galactica
  - Lee Adama, a character in the 2004–09 TV series Battlestar Galactica
- Adama (album), a 1998 Avishai Cohen recording
- Adama (biblical), one of the Old Testament "Cities of the Plain"
- Adama (film), a 2015 French film
- Adama (woreda), a district in Ethiopia
- Adama Agricultural Solutions, an Israel-based crop protection company

== See also ==
- Adamas (disambiguation)
