= Tommaso Brignoli =

Italian professional footballer

Personal information
- Date of birth: 23 December 1999 (age 26)
- Place of birth: Desio, Italy
- Height: 1.84 m (6 ft 0 in)
- Position: Midfielder

Team information
- Current team: Club Milan

Youth career
- Rende
- Inter Milan

Senior career*
| Years | Team | Apps | (Gls) |
| 2016 | Rende | 0 | (0) |
| 2016–2019 | Inter Milan | 0 | (0) |
| 2018–2019 | → Monza (loan) | 0 | (0) |
| 2019 | → Rende (loan) | 2 | (0) |
| 2019–2023 | Pro Patria | 57 | (1) |
| 2023–2024 | Pro Sesto | 1 | (0) |
| 2024– | Club Milan | 4 | (0) |
- * Club domestic league appearances and goals as of 25 June 2026

Tommaso Brignoli (born 23 December 1999) is an Italian professional footballer who plays as a midfielder for Club Milan.

== Career ==
On 11 January 2024, Brignoli's contract with Pro Sesto was terminated by mutual consent.
