= Adama Dosso =

Adama Dosso is an Ivorian diplomat, the Ambassador of Ivory Coast to China since August 2014. The Ambassador of Ivory Coast to China also acts as non-resident ambassador to Thailand, Laos, Cambodia, Vietnam, North Korea and Myanmar.

== Biography ==
Between 2011 and 2014, Adama Dosso was the Ambassador of Ivory Coast to Cameroon.

In August 2014, Adama Dosso was appointed Ambassador of Ivory Coast to China.

In June 2015, he announced the signature of a deal with China's Tiesiju Civil Engineering Group Co to build agricultural centers in 11 regions of the Ivory Coast, a deal worth $53 million.

In January 2017, he addressed his diplomatic credentials to the newly elected president of Vietnam Trần Đại Quang as non-resident Ambassador of Ivory Coast to Vietnam. In June 2017, Adama Dosso also became the first (non-resident) Ambassador of Ivory Coast to Cambodia. That same month, he went on air on Ivorian TV to confirm the death of the Ivorian football player Cheick Tioté.

In April 2018, he gave his letters of credence to the recently elected president of Mongolia Khaltmaagiin Battulga as non-resident Ambassador of Ivory Coast to Mongolia.

== Related pages ==
- List of ambassadors of Ivory Coast to China
