= Adama Traoré =

Adama Traoré may refer to:

- Adama Traoré (footballer, born 1989), Malian footballer
- Adama Traoré (footballer, born 1990), Ivorian footballer
- Adama Malouda Traoré (born 1995), Malian footballer
- Adama Noss Traoré (born 1995), Malian footballer
- Adama Traoré Diarra (born 1996), Spanish footballer
- Adama Traoré (1992–2016), a Malian French man who died in French police custody in 2016
