= Andrea Bandini =

Italian footballer (born 1994)

Personal information
- Date of birth: 16 December 1994 (age 31)
- Place of birth: Milan, Italy
- Height: 1.76 m (5 ft 9 in)
- Position: Right-back

Team information
- Current team: Iris 1914

Youth career
- 2005–2013: Inter

Senior career*
Years	Team	Apps	(Gls)
2013–2019	Inter	0	(0)
2013–2014	→ Reggiana (loan)	18	(0)
2014–2015	→ Prato (loan)	33	(2)
2015–2016	→ Südtirol (loan)	26	(0)
2016–2017	→ Mantova (loan)	26	(1)
2017–2018	→ Brescia (loan)	1	(0)
2018–2019	→ Rimini (loan)	19	(0)
2020	Alcione		
2020–2022	ASD Speranza Agrate		
2022–2023	FC Rhodense		
2023–2024	ACD Sedriano		
2024–2025	Union Calcio Basso Pavese		
2025–	Iris 1914		
- * Club domestic league appearances and goals as of 21 February 2026

Andrea Bandini (born 16 February 1994) is an Italian footballer who plays as a right back for Iris 1914.

== Club career ==
=== Internazionale ===
Bandini made his debut at Inter in the Europa League on 6 December 2012 replacing Jonathan in the 63rd minute against Neftchi Baku. In June 2013 Bandini (for €1 million) and Andrea Romanò (for €1.3 million) were part of the deal that Inter signed Alessandro Capello (for €2.5 million). In June 2014 they returned to their parent clubs for the original prices. Bandini signed a three-year contract in June 2014 with Inter.

==== Loan to Reggiana ====
On 6 July 2013, Bandini was loaned to Lega Pro Prima Divisione side Reggiana on a season-long loan deal. He made his debut in Serie C on 22 September with a 2–0 away win over Carrarese, he played the entire match. On 27 April 2014, Bandini was sent off with a double yellow card in the 56th minute of a 3–2 away defeat against Vicenza. Belloni ended his season-long loan to Reggiana with 18 appearances, all as a starter and all in Serie C.

==== Loan to Prato ====
On 9 July 2014, Bandini was signed on loan by Prato. On 10 August he made his debut with Prato in a 1–0 away defeat against Juve Stabia in the first round of Coppa Italia. He made his Serie C debut with Prato on 30 August in a 1–1 draw against San Marino Calcio. On 7 September, Bandini score his first professional goal for in the 61st minute of a 4–1 home defeat against Tuttocuoio. On 10 January 2015 he scored his second goal in a 2–0 home win over San Marino Calcio. Bandini ended his season-long loan to Prato with 34 appearances, including 25 as a starter, 2 goals and 2 assists.

==== Loan to Südtirol ====
On 19 July 2015, Bandini was signed on loan by Serie C side Südtirol on a season-long loan deal. On 2 August, Bandini made his debut for Südtirol in the first round of Coppa Italia as a substitute replacing Massimiliano Tagliani in the 46th minute of a 1–0 away win over Matera. On 9 August he played in the second round of Coppa Italia, as a substitute replacing Fabian Tait in the 56th minute of a 2–0 away defeat against Pescara. On 6 September, Bandini made his debut for Südtirol in Serie C as a substitute replacing Hannes Fink in the 58th minute of a 1–0 away win over AlbinoLeffe. On 27 September he played his first full match for Südtirol, 2–0 home defeat against Bassano Virtus. Bandini ended his season-long loan to Südtirol with 28 appearances and 3 assists.

==== Loan to Mantova ====
On 25 July 2016, he was signed by Serie C side Mantova on a season-long loan deal. He made his Serie C debut for Mantova on 27 August, he was replaced by Samuele Romeo in the 87th minute of a 1–1 away draw against Ancona. On 3 September, Bandini played his first entire match for Mantova, a 0–0 home draw against Venezia. On 24 September he score his first and only goal for Mantova in the 1st minute of a 2–1 home defeat against FeralpiSalò. He play his 100th professional match on 30 December against Venezia in a 3–1 away defeat. In this season with Mantova Baldini made 26 appearances, 1 goal and 1 assist all in Serie C.

==== Loan to Brescia ====
On 31 August 2017 Bandini was signed on loan with option to buy by Brescia. On 3 October, Bandini made his debut for Brescia in Serie B, he was replaced by Tommaso Cancellotti in the 81st minute of a 1–1 away draw against Ternana. Bandini ended his season-long loan to Brescia with only 1 appearance.

==== Loan to Rimini ====
On 25 July 2018, Bandini was loaned to Serie C club Rimini.

== Career statistics ==
=== Club ===
As of 21 October 2018

Club	Season	League			Cup		Europe		Other		Total	
Club	Season	League	Apps	Goals	Apps	Goals	Apps	Goals	Apps	Goals	Apps	Goals
Internazionale	2012–13	Serie A	0	0	0	0	1	0	—		1	0
Reggina (loan)	2013–14	Serie C	18	0	0	0	—		—		18	0
Prato (loan)	2014–15	Serie C	33	2	1	0	—		—		34	2
Südtirol (loan)	2015–16	Serie C	26	0	2	0	—		—		28	0
Mantova (loan)	2016–17	Serie C	26	1	0	0	—		—		26	1
Brescia (loan)	2017–18	Serie B	1	0	0	0	—		—		1	0
Rimini (loan)	2018–19	Serie C	6	0	0	0	—		—		6	0
Career total			110	3	3	0	1	0	—		114	3

== Honours ==
Inter Primavera

- Campionato Nazionale Primavera: 2011–12
