= ADAMAS =

2018 song by LiSA

Single by LiSA
- Released: October 8, 2018
- Recorded: 2018
- Genre: J-pop; rock; anison
- Length: 3:44
- Label: Sacra Music
- Songwriter: LiSA
- Composer: Kayoko Kusano

"ADAMAS" is a song recorded by Japanese pop singer Lisa. It was released on October 8, 2018, by Sacra Music as part of a double A-side single. The song was used as the first opening theme for Sword Art Online: Alicization, the third season of the Sword Art Online anime series.

The single was certified Platinum in digital downloads, after surpassing 250,000 downloads. It placed second on the Japanese Oricon weekly sales chart, marking Lisa's third entry into the top 10, after "Crossing Field" and "Oath Sign".

== Development and release ==
The production of "ADAMAS" involved a collaborative development structure where the work was distributed among key individuals: the lyrics were written by Lisa herself, while the primary musical composition (melody) was handled by Kayoko Kusano. The track's final arrangement and production was executed by Shota Horie. The recording sessions for the track took place in 2018 in conjunction with its planned use as the first opening theme for the anime series Sword Art Online: Alicization. The song was initially released to the public in a digital format on October 8, 2018, before being issued physically as part of Lisa's 14th double A-side single, "Akai Wana (who loves it?)/ADAMAS", which followed on December 12, 2018, under the Sacra Music label.

== Reception ==
Music critics and publications have praised "ADAMAS" for its aggressive rock sound and compatibility with the Sword Art Online franchise. In a review for the Japanese music portal Skream!, the track was described as a "killer tune" that highlights Lisa's vocal power and the "symbiosis" between her music and the anime series she frequently represents. The review noted the song's "upper" (up-tempo) rock style, contrasting it with the symphonic elements of the accompanying A-side "Akai Wana". The track is frequently cited as a staple of Lisa's live performances, often grouped with her other high-energy anime themes like "Gurenge".

A concert review published by the online music magazine KpopWise analyzed the track's musical role within a live performance setting. The reviewer noted that "ADAMAS" provided a structural contrast to the slower, more emotional ballads in the setlist, serving as a key component of the performance’s high-energy, driving rock segments.

== Release history and formats ==
Release dates and formats for "ADAMAS" / "Akai Wana (who loves it?)/ADAMAS"
Region	Date	Format	Version	Label
Various	October 8, 2018	Digital download	Single ("ADAMAS" only)	Sacra Music
Japan	December 12, 2018	CD	Regular Edition	Sacra Music
Japan	December 12, 2018	CD+DVD	Limited Edition	Sacra Music
Japan	December 12, 2018	CD+DVD	Limited Anime Edition	Sacra Music

== Charts ==
Weekly charts
Chart (2018)	Peak position
Japan (Oricon)	2
Japan Hot 100 (Billboard)	4
Japan Hot Animation (Billboard)	1

Certifications
Region	Certification	Certified units
Japan (RIAJ)	Platinum	250,000
