= Alessandro Mattioli =

Italian footballer (born 1998)

Personal information
- Date of birth: 13 February 1998 (age 28)
- Place of birth: Reggio Emilia, Italy
- Height: 1.81 m (5 ft 11 in)
- Position: Defender

Team information
- Current team: Pro Palazzolo
- Number: 25

Youth career
- –2012: Reggiana
- 2012–2017: Internazionale

Senior career*
Years	Team	Apps	(Gls)
2017–2019	Internazionale	0	(0)
2017–2018	→ Renate (loan)	28	(2)
2018–2019	→ Cuneo (loan)	16	(0)
2019	→ Südtirol (loan)	6	(0)
2019–2021	Modena	38	(0)
2021–2023	Cittadella	33	(0)
2023–2025	Vis Pesaro	26	(1)
2025–	Pro Palazzolo	15	(0)

International career^{‡}
2013–2014	Italy U16	8	(1)
2014–2015	Italy U17	14	(0)
2015–2016	Italy U18	6	(0)
2016–2018	Italy U19	3	(0)
- * Club domestic league appearances and goals as of 14 September 2025 ‡ National team caps and goals as of 11 February 2018

Alessandro Mattioli (born 13 February 1998) is an Italian footballer who plays as a defender for Serie D club Pro Palazzolo.

== Club career ==
=== Internazionale ===
Born in Reggio Emilia, Mattioli is a youth exponent of Inter Milan.

==== Loan to Renate ====
On 12 July 2017, Mattioli and Michele Di Gregorio were loaned to Serie C side Renate on a season-long loan deal. On 30 July, Mattioli made his professional debut for Renate as a substitute replacing Francesco Finocchio in the 89th minute of a 3–1 home win over Siracusa in the first round of Coppa Italia. On 3 September he made his Serie C debut as a substitute replacing Gabriel Lunetta in the 79th minute of a 1–0 away win over FeralpiSalò. On 29 October he scored his first professional goal, as a substitute, in the 77th minute of a 2–0 away win over Bassano Virtus. One week later, Mattioli played his first match in Serie C as a starter, a 2–1 home win over Gubbio. On 9 December he played his first entire match for Renate, a 3–1 away defeat against Fermana. On 25 March 2018 he scored his second goal in the 77th minute of a 2–0 home win over Vicenza. Mattioli ended his loan to Renate with 32 appearances, 2 goals and 2 assist.

==== Loan to Cuneo and Südtirol ====
On 20 August 2018, Mattioli was loaned to Serie C side Cuneo on a season-long loan deal. On 17 September he made his debut for Cuneo in Serie C in a 1–0 away defeat against Pisa, he was replaced by Davide Arras after 67 minutes. One week later, on 23 September he played his first entire match for Cuneo, a 1–1 home draw against Gozzano. In January 2019 his loan was interrupted and he returned to Inter leaving Cuneo with 16 appearances, 14 as a starter.

On 31 January 2019, Mattioli was signed by Serie C club Südtirol on a 6-month loan deal. On 2 February he made his debut as a substitute replacing Tommaso Morosini in the 90th minute of a 4–2 away win over AlbinoLeffe. On 28 April he played his first and only entire match for the club, a 2–0 away defeat against Imolese. Mattioli ended his loan to Südtirol with only 6 appearances.

=== Modena ===
On 19 July 2019, Mattioli joined to newly promoted Serie C club Modena on an undisclosed fee. On 25 August he made his debut for the club in a 0–0 home draw against Vicenza Virtus, he played the entire match. He became Modena's first-choice early in the season.

=== Cittadella ===
On 9 July 2021, he joined Serie B side Cittadella.

=== Vis Pesaro ===
On 1 September 2023, he went to Vis Pesaro.

== International career ==
Mattioli represented Italy at Under-16, Under-17, Under-18 and Under-19 level. On 5 November 2013, Mattioli made his debut at U-16 level and he scored his first international goal in the 68th minute of a 1–1 home draw against Austria U-16, he played the entire match. On 10 September he made his debut at U-17 level in a 0–0 away draw against Israel U-17, he was replaced by Andrea Malberti in the 52nd minute. Mattioli with Italy U-17 played 3 matches in the 2015 UEFA European Under-17 Championship qualification and 5 matches in the 2015 UEFA European Under-17 Championship. On 12 August 2015, Mattioli made his debut at U-18 level in a 0–0 home draw against Bulgaria U-18, he was replaced by Alessandro Vogliacco in the 57th minute. On 11 November 2015 he played his first entire match for Italy U-18, a 2–0 away defeat against Austria U-18. On 11 August 2016, Mattili made his debut at U-19 level in a 1–0 home defeat against Croatia U-19, he was replaced by Luca Coccolo in the 64th minute. On 15 November 2016 he played a match in the 2017 UEFA European Under-19 Championship qualification as a substitute replacing Claud Adjapong in the 93rd minute of a 1–1 draw against Switzerland U-19.

== Career statistics ==
=== Club ===
As of 8 July 2020

Club	Season	League			Cup		Europe		Other		Total	
Club	Season	League	Apps	Goals	Apps	Goals	Apps	Goals	Apps	Goals	Apps	Goals
Renate (loan)	2017–18	Serie C	28	2	3	0	—		1 (Note: All appearance(s) in Serie C play-off.)	0	32	2
Cuneo (loan)	2018–19	Serie C	16	0	0	0	—		—		16	0
Südtirol (loan)	2018–19	Serie C	6	0	—		—		—		6	0
Modena	2019–20	Serie C	22	0	0	0	—		—		22	0
Career total			72	2	3	0	—		1	0	76	2

== Honours ==
=== Club ===
Inter Primavera

- Campionato Nazionale Primavera: 2016–17
