= Adama Fofana (footballer, born 1989) =

Ivorian footballer

Personal information
- Full name: Adama Fofana
- Date of birth: 20 December 1989 (age 36)
- Place of birth: Bouaké, Ivory Coast
- Height: 1.80 m (5 ft 11 in)
- Position: Forward

Youth career
- –2005: ASEC Mimosas
- 2005–2007: Brescia

Senior career*
| Years | Team | Apps | (Gls) |
| 2007–2014 | Brescia | 3 | (0) |
| 2008–2009 | → Como (loan) | 17 | (1) |
| 2009–2010 | → Isola Liri (loan) | 2 | (1) |
| 2010–2011 | → Ethnikos Piraeus (loan) | 5 | (2) |
| 2011–2012 | → Ekranas (loan) | 23 | (5) |
| 2014–2015 | Internazionale | 0 | (0) |
| 2014–2015 | → Prato (loan) | 5 | (1) |
| 2015-? | → F.C Scheibenhard (loan) | | |
- * Club domestic league appearances and goals

Adama Fofana (born 20 December 1989) is an Ivorian footballer who plays as a forward.

== Career ==
Fofana made his professional debut with Brescia Calcio during the 2007–08 season. During the 2008–09 season, he played for Como Calcio, playing 18 games with 1 goal and 4 assists. In January 2010, he played again for Brescia.

In June 2014, Fofana joined Inter Milan on a free transfer. In July 2014, Fofana, Roberto Ogunseye, Andrea Romanò and Gianmarco Gabbianelli were signed by Prato in a temporary deal.
