= Adama Diakité (footballer, born 1991) =

French footballer (born 1991)

Personal information
- Date of birth: 7 March 1991 (age 35)
- Place of birth: Paris, France
- Height: 1.74 m (5 ft 9 in)
- Position: Striker

Team information
- Current team: Marignane Gignac

Youth career
- Red Star

Senior career*
Years	Team	Apps	(Gls)
2008–2013	Lens B	104	(19)
2012–2013	Lens	8	(0)
2014	SV Sandhausen	3	(0)
2014–2016	ES Wasquehal	26	(7)
2016–2017	Villefranche	14	(1)
2017–2019	Feignies Aulnoye	52	(8)
2019–2020	Martigues	15	(2)
2020–2021	Istres	5	(0)
2021–2022	Côte Bleue	15	(2)
2022–	Marignane Gignac	16	(1)
- * Club domestic league appearances and goals as of 1 July 2023

Adama Diakité (born 7 March 1991) is a French professional footballer who plays as a striker for Marignane GCB FC.

== Career ==
Paris-born Diakité began playing football for Red Star 93. He joined the youth team of RC Lens in 2008, and made his senior debut for the reserve team in a Championnat de France amateur match on 16 August 2008 against US Sénart-Moissy. In the following three years, he played for the reserve side, before making his professional debut for RC Lens on 14 September 2012 in a Ligue 2 game against LB Châteauroux. Then, he participated in seven games more as a substitute in the 2012–13 season for the first team of RC Lens. He played 104 games and scored 19 goals for the Lens reserves, before he was released from his contract by the club.

In January 2014, after remaining a free agent for half a year, he signed a contract until the end of the 2013–14 season with German 2. Bundesliga club SV Sandhausen.
