= Gianmarco Gabbianelli =

Italian footballer

Personal information
- Date of birth: 20 May 1994 (age 32)
- Place of birth: Fano, Italy
- Height: 1.77 m (5 ft 10 in)
- Position: Midfielder

Team information
- Current team: Alma Fano

Youth career
- –2010: Rimini
- 2010–2014: Inter Milan

Senior career*
Years	Team	Apps	(Gls)
2012–2016	Inter Milan	0	(0)
2013–2014	→ Pro Patria (loan)	23	(1)
2014–2016	→ Prato (loan)	45	(2)
2016–2017	Fano	30	(1)
2017–2018	Matelica	29	(6)
2018–2019	Monterosi	37	(12)
2019–2020	Campodarsego	20	(10)
2020–2021	AlbinoLeffe	18	(1)
2021–2023	Rimini	67	(17)
2023	Aglianese	10	(0)
2023–2024	Luparense	13	(1)
2024–2025	Vigor Senigallia	25	(3)
2025–2026	Desenzano	26	(6)
2026–	Alma Fano		
- * Club domestic league appearances and goals as of 3 May 2026

Gianmarco Gabbianelli (born 20 May 1994) is an Italian professional footballer who plays as a midfielder for Eccellenza club Alma Fano.

== Club career ==
On 6 August 2021, Gabbianelli joined to Serie D club Rimini. On 9 August 2023, his contract with Rimini was terminated by mutual consent.
