= Adama Fofana (footballer, born 2001) =

Ivorian footballer

Personal information
- Date of birth: 4 January 2001 (age 25)
- Height: 1.80 m (5 ft 11 in)
- Position: Winger

Youth career
- Olympic Sport d’Abobo
- 2019–2020: Vejle

Senior career*
Years	Team	Apps	(Gls)
2020–2023	Vejle	3	(0)
2020	→ HIFK (loan)	19	(1)
2020	→ MyPa (loan)	1	(0)
2022	→ MFK Vyškov (loan)	14	(3)
2023–2025	Žalgiris	45	(6)
- * Club domestic league appearances and goals as of 14 January 2026

Adama Fofana (born 4 January 2001) is an Ivorian professional footballer who plays as a winger for Žalgiris.

== Club career ==
Fofana signed a contract with Danish club Vejle on 19 August 2019.

Joined HIFK on loan on 30 December 2019. He made his Veikkausliiga debut for HIFK on 1 July 2020 in a game against KuPS. Fofana scored his first goal in Veikkausliiga against IFK Mariehamn on 26 July 2020.

On 14 July 2022, Czech club MFK Vyškov joined on loan.

Fofana signed a contract with Lithuanian A Lyga club Žalgiris on 26 February 2023. Fofana made his debut for Žalgiris on 11 March 2023 against Banga Gargždai.

== Career statistics ==
As of 1 December 2024.

Appearances and goals by club, season and competition
Club	Season	League			Cup (Note: Includes Danish Cup, Suomen Cup, Czech Cup and Lithuanian Cup)		Europe		Total	
Club	Season	Division	Apps	Goals	Apps	Goals	Apps	Goals	Apps	Goals
Vejle BK	2019–20	Danish 1st Division	0	0	1	0	–		1	0
Vejle BK	2020–21	Danish Superliga	2	0	1	0	–		3	0
Vejle BK	2021–22	Danish Superliga	1	0	0	0	–		1	0
Vejle BK	Total		3	0	2	0	0	0	5	0
HIFK (loan)	2020	Veikkausliiga	19	1	3	0	–		22	1
MYPA (loan)	2020	Ykkönen	1	0	–		–		1	0
MFK Vyškov (loan)	2022–23	FNL	14	3	3	3	–		17	6
Žalgiris	2023	A Lyga	20	0	2	1	2 (Note: Appearances in UEFA Champions League and UEFA Europa League)	0	24	1
Žalgiris	2024	A Lyga	21	6	2	0	4 (Note: Appearances in UEFA Conference League)	2	27	8
Žalgiris	Total		41	6	4	1	6	2	51	9
Career total			78	10	12	4	6	2	96	16
