= 2016–17 Inter Milan season =

Internazionale
2016–17 season
- President: Erick Thohir
- Manager: Frank de Boer (until 1 November 2016); Stefano Vecchi (from 1 November 2016 until 7 November 2016); Stefano Pioli (from 8 November 2016 until 9 May 2017); Stefano Vecchi (from 9 May 2017)
- Stadium: San Siro
- Serie A: 7th
- Coppa Italia: Quarter-finals
- UEFA Europa League: Group stage
- Top goalscorer: League: Mauro Icardi (24); All: Mauro Icardi (26)
- Highest home attendance: 78,328 vs Milan (15 April 2017, Serie A)
- Lowest home attendance: 14,856 vs Sparta Prague (8 December 2016)
- Average home league attendance: 46,622
Home colours	Away colours	Third colours

The 2016–17 season was Football Club Internazionale Milano's 108th in existence and 101st consecutive season in the top flight of Italian football. The team competed in Serie A, in the Coppa Italia, and in the UEFA Europa League.

== Kit ==
Supplier: Nike / Sponsor: Pirelli

Home	Home alt. 1	Home alt. 2	Home 2017-18	Away	Away alt. 1	Away alt. 2	Away alt. 3	Third
Goalkeeper 1	Goalkeeper 2	Goalkeeper 3

== Season overview ==
During the summer of UEFA Euro 2016, a Chinese company, Suning Holdings Group, bought almost all the shares of club. Roberto Mancini left the side days before the season started, with Frank de Boer called to replace him: when he was appointed, the Dutch manager barely knew Italian. This season resulted, once again, in disappointment for supporters; De Boer started with poor results against low-ranked opponents, such as Chievo and Palermo, deteriorating the opinion of his fans. In these, and other matches, Inter had a shortness of goals with the result that their wins were, often, due to the performances of individual players (mainly the captain Icardi and Perišić).

The European campaign proved to be poor, with a group phase opened with two losses. De Boer took the blame for Inter's defeats, being fired after the 1–0 loss to Sampdoria. His successor, Stefano Pioli, could not avoid failure in the Europa League: Inter recorded the worst group result of its history in UEFA competitions, with only six points gained. Pioli then collected a streak of eight consecutive wins, seven of which were in Serie A. However, not even the notable number of players bought (Candreva, Banega, João Mário, Barbosa, Ansaldi in the summer, plus Sainsbury and Gagliardini in January) and the young (Bakayoko, Pinamonti, Gnoukouri, Miangue, Yao and Radu) helped the side to recover enough points to enter the top three. As the result, Inter missed the European qualification for the 2017–18 season.

== Players ==
=== Squad information ===
As of 31 January 2017.

Squad no.	Name	Nationality	Position	Date of birth (age)
Goalkeepers
1	Samir Handanović	(Slovenia)	GK	14 July 1984 (aged 32)
30	Juan Pablo Carrizo	(Argentina)	GK	6 May 1984 (aged 33)
46	Tommaso Berni ^{HG}	(Italy)	GK	6 March 1983 (aged 34)
92	Michele Di Gregorio ^{U21 + List B}	(Italy)	GK	27 July 1997 (aged 19)
97	Ionuț Radu ^{U21 + List B}	(Romania)	GK	28 May 1997 (aged 20)
Defenders
2	Marco Andreolli ^{CT}	(Italy)	CB/RB	10 June 1986 (aged 31)
15	Cristian Ansaldi	(Argentina)	LB/LW	20 September 1986 (aged 30)
20	Trent Sainsbury (on loan from Jiangsu Suning)	(Australia)	CB	5 January 1992 (aged 25)
21	Davide Santon ^{CT}	(Italy)	RB/LB	2 January 1991 (aged 26)
24	Jeison Murillo	(Colombia)	CB	27 May 1992 (aged 25)
25	Miranda	(Brazil)	CB	7 September 1984 (aged 32)
33	Danilo D'Ambrosio ^{HG}	(Italy)	RB/LB/CB	9 September 1988 (aged 28)
55	Yuto Nagatomo	(Japan)	RB/LB	12 September 1986 (aged 30)
94	Yao Eloge Koffi ^{U21 + List B}	(Ivory Coast)	CB	20 January 1996 (aged 21)
Midfielders
5	Roberto Gagliardini (on loan from Atalanta) ^{HG}	(Italy)	CM	8 April 1994 (aged 23)
6	João Mário	(Portugal)	RM/AM/CM	19 January 1993 (aged 24)
7	Geoffrey Kondogbia	(France)	DM/CM	15 February 1993 (aged 24)
17	Gary Medel	(Chile)	DM/CB	3 August 1987 (aged 29)
19	Éver Banega	(Argentina)	CM/AM	29 June 1988 (aged 29)
77	Marcelo Brozović	(Croatia)	CM/AM	16 November 1992 (aged 24)
98	Marco Carraro ^{U21 + List B}	(Italy)	MF	9 January 1998 (aged 19)
Forwards
8	Rodrigo Palacio	(Argentina)	FW/SS	5 February 1982 (aged 35)
9	Mauro Icardi (Captain) ^{HG}	(Argentina)	FW	19 February 1993 (aged 24)
11	Jonathan Biabiany ^{CT}	(France)	RW/RM	28 April 1988 (aged 29)
23	Éder	(Italy)	FW/RW/LW/SS	15 November 1986 (aged 30)
44	Ivan Perišić	(Croatia)	LW/RW/AM/LM	2 February 1989 (aged 28)
87	Antonio Candreva ^{HG}	(Italy)	RW/RM/AM	28 February 1987 (aged 30)
93	Axel Mohamed Bakayoko ^{U21 + List B}	(France)	FW	6 January 1998 (aged 19)
96	Gabriel ^{U21}	(Brazil)	FW	30 August 1996 (aged 20)

- Note: Some players were registered for the domestic competitions only (João Mário, Kondogbia, Jovetić and Gabriel), and vice versa for Berni, who was registered to 2016–17 UEFA Europa League only (Lega Serie A allowed clubs to replace one goalkeeper by another goalkeeper on the list). Both UEFA and Lega Serie A imposed a cap on the first team squad, originally both were capped at 25 players with additional requirements on homegrown players (marked as ^{HG}) and club-trained players (marked as ^{CT}), with exclusion for club-trained under-21 players (UEFA and Lega Serie A defined U21 players differently; marked as ^{List B} and ^{U21} respectively). However, due to Internazionale had a net loss that over the threshold of UEFA Financial Fair Play Regulations, Inter was limited to 22 players in the UEFA competitions plus unlimited club-trained under-21 players in the List B, as well as restriction to register some expensive signings.

== Transfers ==
=== In ===
Date	Pos.	Player	Age	Moving from	Type	Fee	Source
Summer
28 May 2016	MF	(Argentina) Éver Banega	27	(Spain) Sevilla	Transfer	Free	
1 June 2016	DF	(Turkey) Caner Erkin	27	(Turkey) Fenerbahçe	Transfer	Free	
1 July 2016	DF	(Brazil) Dodô	24	(Italy) Roma	Transfer	€7,800,000	
1 July 2016	MF	(Croatia) Marcelo Brozović	23	(Croatia) Dinamo Zagreb	Transfer	Undisclosed	
1 July 2016	FW	(Albania) Rey Manaj	19	(Italy) Cremonese	Transfer	Undisclosed	
8 July 2016	FW	(Italy) Gianluca Caprari	22	(Italy) Pescara	Transfer	Undisclosed	
9 July 2016	FW	(Montenegro) Stevan Jovetić	27	(England) Manchester City	Transfer	€14,500,000	
20 July 2016	DF	(Brazil) Miranda	31	(Spain) Atlético Madrid	Transfer	€11,000,000	
30 July 2016	DF	(Argentina) Cristian Ansaldi	29	(Italy) Genoa	Transfer	Undisclosed	
3 August 2016	MF	(Italy) Antonio Candreva	29	(Italy) Lazio	Transfer	Undisclosed	
28 August 2016	MF	(Portugal) João Mário	23	(Portugal) Sporting CP	Transfer	€40,000,000 + €5,000,000 (objective bonus)	
30 August 2016	FW	(Brazil) Gabriel	20	(Brazil) Santos	Transfer		
30 June 2016	GK	(Italy) Raffaele Di Gennaro	22	(Italy) Latina	Loan return		
30 June 2016	DF	(Brazil) Dodô	24	(Italy) Sampdoria	Loan return		
30 June 2016	DF	(Italy) Andrea Ranocchia	28	(Italy) Sampdoria	Loan return		
30 June 2016	DF	(Italy) Marco Andreolli	30	(Spain) Sevilla	Loan return		
30 June 2016	DF	(Italy) Federico Dimarco	18	(Italy) Ascoli	Loan return		
30 June 2016	DF	(Ghana) Isaac Donkor	20	(Italy) Bari	Loan return		
30 June 2016	DF	(Italy) Cristiano Biraghi	23	(Spain) Granada	Loan return		
30 June 2016	DF	(Ivory Coast) Eloge Yao	20	(Italy) Crotone	Loan return		
30 June 2016	DF	(Italy) Fabio Eguelfi	21	(Italy) Prato	Loan return		
30 June 2016	DF	(Italy) Leonardo Longo	21	(Italy) Mantova	Loan return		
30 June 2016	DF	(Italy) Giacomo Sciacca	20	(Italy) Renate	Loan return		
30 June 2016	DF	(Italy) Andrea Pinton	20	(Italy) Vicenza	Loan return		
30 June 2016	DF	(Italy) Andrea Bandini	22	(Italy) Südtirol	Loan return		
30 June 2016	DF	(Italy) Matteo Vito Lomolino	20	(Italy) Savona	Loan return		
30 June 2016	MF	(Uruguay) Diego Laxalt	23	(Italy) Genoa	Loan return		
30 June 2016	MF	(Italy) Simone Pasa	22	(Italy) Pordenone	Loan return		
30 June 2016	MF	(Italy) Daniel Bessa	23	(Italy) Como	Loan return		
30 June 2016	MF	(Italy) Andrea Palazzi	20	(Italy) Livorno	Loan return		
30 June 2016	MF	(Italy) Niccolò Belloni	23	(Italy) Ternana	Loan return		
30 June 2016	MF	(Italy) Lorenzo Tassi	21	(Italy) Savona	Loan return		
30 June 2016	MF	(Italy) Andrea Romanò	23	(Italy) Renate	Loan return		
30 June 2016	MF	(Italy) Riccardo Gaiola	20	(Italy) Prato	Loan return		
30 June 2016	MF	(Denmark) Morten Knudsen	21	(Italy) Prato	Loan return		
30 June 2016	MF	(Italy) Gianmarco Gabbianelli	22	(Italy) Prato	Loan return		
30 June 2016	MF	(Italy) Demetrio Steffè	19	(Italy) Savona	Loan return		
30 June 2016	MF	(Ghana) Edmund Hottor	23	(Portugal) Atlético CP	Loan return		
30 June 2016	FW	(Italy) Samuele Longo	24	(Italy) Frosinone	Loan return		
30 June 2016	FW	(Romania) George Pușcaș	20	(Italy) Bari	Loan return		
30 June 2016	FW	(Guinea) Gaston Camara	20	(Italy) Modena	Loan return		
30 June 2016	FW	(Italy) Francesco Forte	23	(Italy) Teramo	Loan return		
30 June 2016	FW	(United States) Dylan Alexis Romney	20	(Italy) Savona	Loan return		
30 June 2016	FW	(Italy) Giuseppe Maiorano	20	(Italy) Lupa Castelli	Loan return		
30 June 2016	FW	(Italy) Vincenzo Tommasone	21	(Italy) Paganese	Loan return		
31 August 2016	MF	(Italy) Lorenzo Crisetig	23	(Italy) Bologna	Loan return		
Winter
11 January 2017	FW	(Nigeria) Roberto Ogunseye	21	(Italy) Prato	Loan return		
15 January 2017	FW	(Guinea-Bissau) Zé Turbo	20	(Portugal) Tondela	Loan return		
17 January 2017	FW	(Albania) Rey Manaj	19	(Italy) Pescara	Loan return		
20 January 2017	FW	(Italy) Francesco Forte	23	(Italy) Lucchese	Loan return		
21 January 2017	DF	(Italy) Alessandro Sobacchi	19	(Italy) Prato	Loan return		
31 January 2017	GK	(Italy) Davide Costa	23	(Italy) Virtus Francavilla	Loan return		
31 January 2017	DF	(Ghana) Isaac Donkor	21	(Italy) Avellino	Loan return		
31 January 2017	MF	(Italy) Lorenzo Tassi	21	(Italy) Avellino	Loan return		
11 January 2017	MF	(Italy) Roberto Gagliardini	23	(Italy) Atalanta	Loan (w. obligation)		
31 January 2017	DF	(Australia) Trent Sainsbury	25	(China) Jiangsu Suning	Loan		

=== Out ===
Date	Pos.	Player	Age	Moving to	Type	Fee	Source
Summer
1 July 2016	DF	(Paraguay) Rodrigo Alborno	22	(Paraguay) Libertad	Transfer	Free	
1 July 2016	MF	(Uruguay) Diego Laxalt	23	(Italy) Genoa	Transfer	Undisclosed	
1 July 2016	MF	(Italy) Simone Pasa	22	(Italy) Cittadella	Transfer	Free	
4 July 2016	DF	(Italy) Matteo Lomolino	20	(Italy) Südtirol	Transfer	Free	
11 July 2016	DF	(Italy) Cristiano Biraghi	23	(Italy) Pescara	Transfer	Undisclosed	
20 July 2016	DF	(Italy) Leonardo Longo	21	(Italy) US Catanzaro	Transfer	Free	
21 July 2016	DF	(Romania) Răzvan Popa	19	(Spain) Real Zaragoza	Transfer		
27 July 2016	MF	(Italy) Gianmarco Gabbianelli	22	(Italy) Fano	Transfer	Free	
28 August 2016	MF	(Portugal) Pedro Delgado	19	(Portugal) Sporting CP	Transfer		
31 August 2016	MF	(Italy) Christian Silenzi	19	(Italy) Reggina	Transfer		
31 August 2016	MF	(Italy) Lorenzo Crisetig	23	(Italy) Bologna	Transfer		
31 August 2016	FW	(United States) Dylan Alexis Romney	20	(France) Paris FC B	Transfer	Free	
9 September 2016	MF	(Italy) Demetrio Steffè	19	(Italy) Teramo	Transfer	Free	
30 June 2016	DF	(Brazil) Dodô	24	(Italy) Roma	Loan return		
30 June 2016	DF	(Brazil) Alex Telles	23	(Turkey) Galatasaray	Loan return		
30 June 2016	MF	(Serbia) Adem Ljajić	24	(Italy) Roma	Loan return		
30 June 2016	MF	(Croatia) Marcelo Brozović	23	(Croatia) Dinamo Zagreb	Loan return		
30 June 2016	FW	(Albania) Rey Manaj	19	(Italy) Cremonese	Loan return		
9 July 2016	FW	(Montenegro) Stevan Jovetić	27	(England) Manchester City	Loan return		
20 July 2016	DF	(Brazil) Miranda	31	(Spain) Atlético Madrid	Loan return		
1 July 2016	DF	(Italy) Federico Dimarco	18	(Italy) Empoli	Loan		
1 July 2016	DF	(Ghana) Isaac Donkor	20	(Italy) Avellino	Loan		
1 July 2016	MF	(Italy) Andrea Palazzi	20	(Italy) Pro Vercelli	Loan		
1 July 2016	MF	(Italy) Enrico Baldini	19	(Italy) Pro Vercelli	Loan		
1 July 2016	MF	(Italy) Niccolò Belloni	22	(Italy) Avellino	Loan		
1 July 2016	MF	(Italy) Lorenzo Tassi	21	(Italy) Avellino	Loan		
1 July 2016	FW	(Italy) Gianluca Caprari	22	(Italy) Pescara	Loan		
11 July 2016	FW	(Albania) Rey Manaj	19	(Italy) Pescara	Loan		
12 July 2016	DF	(Italy) Alessandro Sobacchi	19	(Italy) Prato	Loan		
13 July 2016	DF	(Brazil) Juan Jesus	23	(Italy) Roma	Loan	€2,000,000	
15 July 2016	DF	(Ghana) Bright Gyamfi	20	(Italy) Benevento	Loan		
15 July 2016	DF	(Italy) Fabio Eguelfi	21	(Italy) Pro Vercelli	Loan		
15 July 2016	FW	(Romania) George Pușcaș	20	(Italy) Benevento	Loan		
16 July 2016	GK	(Italy) Davide Costa	20	(Italy) Virtus Francavilla	Loan		
16 July 2016	FW	(Italy) Samuele Longo	24	(Spain) Girona	Loan		
18 July 2016	DF	(Italy) Giacomo Sciacca	20	(Italy) Piacenza	Loan		
21 July 2016	FW	(Guinea) Gaston Camara	20	(Italy) Brescia	Loan		
22 July 2016	FW	(Italy) Francesco Forte	23	(Italy) Lucchese	Loan		
25 July 2016	DF	(Italy) Andrea Bandini	22	(Italy) Mantova	Loan		
3 August 2016	MF	(Italy) Riccardo Gaiola	20	(Italy) Padova	Loan		
4 August 2016	FW	(Guinea-Bissau) Zé Turbo	19	(Portugal) Tondela	Loan		
12 August 2016	MF	(Italy) Daniel Bessa	23	(Italy) Hellas Verona	Loan (w. obligation)		
18 August 2016	DF	(Brazil) Dodô	24	(Italy) Sampdoria	2-year Loan (w. obligation)		
19 August 2016	GK	(Italy) Raffaele Di Gennaro	22	(Italy) Ternana	Loan		
19 August 2016	DF	(Italy) Fabio Della Giovanna	19	(Italy) Ternana	Loan		
30 August 2016	DF	(Turkey) Caner Erkin	27	(Turkey) Beşiktaş	Loan		
30 August 2016	MF	(Denmark) Morten Knudsen	21	(Italy) Reggina	Loan		
30 August 2016	MF	(Ghana) Edmund Hottor	23	(Portugal) Fafe	Loan		
31 August 2016	MF	(Italy) Andrea Romanò	23	(Italy) Reggina	Loan		
31 August 2016	FW	(Italy) Vincenzo Tommasone	21	(Italy) Reggina	Loan		
Winter
8 January 2017	MF	(Brazil) Felipe Melo	33	(Brazil) Palmeiras	Loan	Undisclosed	
10 January 2017	FW	(Montenegro) Stevan Jovetić	27	(Spain) Sevilla	Loan		
12 January 2017	FW	(Nigeria) Roberto Ogunseye	21	(Italy) Olbia	Loan		
16 January 2017	FW	(Guinea-Bissau) Zé Turbo	20	(Spain) Marbella	Loan		
18 January 2017	FW	(Albania) Rey Manaj	19	(Italy) Pisa	Loan		
21 January 2017	FW	(Italy) Francesco Forte	23	(Italy) Perugia	Loan		
26 January 2017	DF	(Belgium) Senna Miangue	19	(Italy) Cagliari	Loan		
27 January 2017	MF	(Ivory Coast) Assane Gnoukouri	20	(Italy) Udinese	Loan		
30 January 2017	MF	(Italy) Loris Zonta	20	(Italy) Pisa	Loan		
31 January 2017	GK	(Italy) Davide Costa	21	(Italy) Vicenza	Loan		
31 January 2017	DF	(Ghana) Isaac Donkor	21	(Italy) Cesena	Loan		
31 January 2017	MF	(Italy) Lorenzo Tassi	21	(Italy) FeralpiSalò	Loan		
31 January 2017	DF	(Italy) Andrea Ranocchia	28	(England) Hull City	Loan		
31 January 2017	DF	(Italy) Alessandro Sobacchi	19	(Italy) Caravaggio	Loan		

== Pre-season and friendlies ==
=== Riscone di Brunico training camp ===
9 July 2016 Friendly	WSG Wattens	0–0	Internazionale	Bruneck
17:00 CEST (UTC+02:00)		Report		Stadium: Riscone di Brunico

14 July 2016 Friendly	Internazionale	1–2	CSKA Sofia	Bruneck
18:00 CEST (UTC+02:00)	Palacio 14'	Report	Nunes 10'; P. Yordanov 56'	Stadium: Riscone di Brunico

=== International Champions Cup ===
24 July 2016 ICC	Internazionale	1–3	Paris Saint-Germain	Eugene, United States
14:00 PDT (UTC−07:00)	Jovetić 45+2' (pen.)	Report	Aurier 15', 87'; Kurzawa 61'	Stadium: Autzen Stadium; Attendance: 24,147; Referee: Jair Marrufo (United States)

30 July 2016 ICC	Internazionale	1–4	Bayern Munich	Charlotte, United States
17:00 EDT (UTC−04:00)	Icardi 89'	Report	Green 7', 30', 34'; Ribéry 13'	Stadium: Bank of America Stadium; Attendance: 53,629; Referee: Mark Kadlecik (United States)

13 August 2016 ICC	Internazionale	2–0	Celtic	Limerick, Ireland
19:00 IST (UTC+01:00)	Éder 45+1'; Candreva 71'	Report		Stadium: Thomond Park; Attendance: 12,873; Referee: Paul McLaughlin (Republic of Ireland)

=== Other friendlies ===
19 July 2016 Friendly	Real Salt Lake	1–2	Internazionale	Sandy, Utah, United States
20:00 MDT (UTC−08:00)	Allen 18'	Report	D'Ambrosio 42'; Jovetić 90+1'	Stadium: Rio Tinto Stadium; Referee: Tyler Ploeger

27 July 2016 Friendly	Internazionale	1–1	Estudiantes	Harrison, New Jersey, United States
20:00 EDT (UTC−04:00)	Nagatomo 5'	Report	Desábato 43'	Stadium: Red Bull Arena; Referee: Rivero

5 August 2016 Friendly	Tottenham Hotspur	6–1	Internazionale	Oslo, Norway
17:00 CEST (UTC+02:00)	Kane 5' (pen.), 57'; Lamela 40'; Alli 52'; Janssen 65'; Harrison 77'	Report	Perišić 24'	Stadium: Ullevaal Stadion; Referee: Svein-Erik Edvartsen

10 August 2016 Friendly	Internazionale	Cancelled	Borussia Mönchengladbach	Ancona
20:30 CEST (UTC+02:00)		Report		Stadium: Stadio del Conero

6 October 2016 Friendly	Internazionale	1–0	FC Lugano	Appiano Gentile
14:00 CEST (UTC+02:00)	Gabriel 19' (pen.)	Report		Stadium: Angelo Moratti Sports Centre

27 October 2016 Friendly	Internazionale	4–2	Renate	Appiano Gentile
	Palacio; Gabriel; Perišić; Jovetić	Report	Goal	Stadium: Angelo Moratti Sports Centre

12 November 2016 Friendly	Internazionale	3–1	Chiasso	Appiano Gentile
	Icardi 17' (pen.); Miangue 33'; Biabiany 40'	Report	Susnjar 30'	Stadium: Angelo Moratti Sports Centre

=== Trofeo Casino Marbella ===
3 January 2017 Friendly	Internazionale	3–2	Real Balompédica Linense	La Línea de la Concepción, Spain
19:20 CET (UTC+01:00)	Murillo 16', 36'; Gabriel 44'	Report	Palomino 3'; Rubio 29' (pen.)	Stadium: Estadio Municipal de La Línea de la Concepción; Referee: Francisco Saez Vidal

3 January 2017 Friendly	Internazionale	1–1 (5–6 p)	Marbella	La Línea de la Concepción, Spain
20:30 CET (UTC+01:00)	Perišić 43'	Report	Okoye 16'	Stadium: Estadio Municipal de La Línea de la Concepción; Referee: Francisco Saez Vidal
	Penalties
	Banega (penalty scored); Ansaldi (penalty scored); João Mário (penalty missed); Perišić (penalty scored); Icardi (penalty missed); Biabiany (penalty scored); Ranocchia (penalty missed)		(penalty scored) Carlos Julio; (penalty scored) Delmonte; (penalty missed) Beitia; (penalty scored) Sánchez; (penalty missed) Márquez; (penalty scored) Okoye; (penalty scored) Diana

== Competitions ==
=== Overall ===
Competition	Started round	Final position	First match	Last match
Serie A	Matchday 1	7th	21 August 2016	28 May 2017
Coppa Italia	Round of 16	Quarter-finals	17 January 2017	31 January 2017
Europa League	Group stage		15 September 2016	8 December 2016

=== Serie A ===
==== League table ====
Pos	Team	Pld	W	D	L	GF	GA	GD	Pts	Qualification or relegation
5	Lazio	38	21	7	10	74	51	+23	70	Qualification for the Europa League group stage (Note: Since the winners of the 2016–17 Coppa Italia, Juventus, qualified for European competition based on league position, the spot awarded to the cup winners (Europa League group stage) was passed to the fifth-placed team and the spot awarded to the fifth-placed team (Europa League third qualifying round) was passed to the sixth-placed team.)
6	Milan	38	18	9	11	57	45	+12	63	Qualification for the Europa League third qualifying round
7	Internazionale	38	19	5	14	72	49	+23	62	
8	Fiorentina	38	16	12	10	63	57	+6	60	
9	Torino	38	13	14	11	71	66	+5	53	

Source: Serie A, Soccerway
Rules for classification: 1) Points; 2) Head-to-head points; 3) Head-to-head goal difference; 4) Goal difference; 5) Goals scored; 6) Draw.

==== Results summary ====
Overall								Home						Away					
Pld	W	D	L	GF	GA	GD	Pts	W	D	L	GF	GA	GD	W	D	L	GF	GA	GD
38	19	5	14	72	49	+23	62	11	3	5	44	22	+22	8	2	9	28	27	+1

Source: Competitive matches

==== Results by round ====
Round	1	2	3	4	5	6	7	8	9	10	11	12	13	14	15	16	17	18	19	20	21	22	23	24	25	26	27	28	29	30	31	32	33	34	35	36	37	38
Ground	A	H	A	H	A	H	A	H	A	H	A	H	A	H	A	H	A	H	A	H	A	H	A	H	A	H	A	H	A	H	A	H	A	H	A	H	A	H
Result	L	D	W	W	W	D	L	L	L	W	L	W	D	W	L	W	W	W	W	W	W	W	L	W	W	L	W	W	D	L	L	D	L	L	L	L	W	W
Position	19	17	11	6	5	3	9	11	14	10	12	9	9	8	10	9	7	7	7	6	5	4	5	4	4	6	6	5	5	6	7	7	7	7	7	8	8	7

Source: Competitive matches
A = Away; H = Home; W = Win; D = Draw; L = Loss

==== Matches ====
21 August 2016 1	Chievo	2–0	Internazionale	Verona
20:45 CEST (UTC+02:00)	Birsa 48', 81'; Meggiorini (yellow card) 72'; Radovanović (yellow card) 78'	Report	D'Ambrosio (yellow card) 29'; Medel (yellow card) 77'; Brozović (yellow card) 80'; Kondogbia (yellow card) 87'	Stadium: Stadio Marc'Antonio Bentegodi; Attendance: 22,000; Referee: Massimiliano Irrati

28 August 2016 2	Internazionale	1–1	Palermo	Milan
18:00 CEST (UTC+02:00)	Icardi 72'; Murillo (yellow card) 76'	Report	Goldaniga (yellow card) 18'; Aleesami (yellow card) 39'; Rispoli 48', (yellow card) 86'; Gazzi (yellow card) 70'; Sallai (yellow card) 81'	Stadium: San Siro; Attendance: 40,527; Referee: Carmine Russo

11 September 2016 3	Pescara	1–2	Internazionale	Pescara
20:45 CEST (UTC+02:00)	Gyömbér (yellow card) 20'; Bahebeck 63'	Report	João Mário (yellow card) 22'; Icardi 77', 90+1'	Stadium: Stadio Adriatico – Giovanni Cornacchia; Attendance: 20,088; Referee: Antonio Damato

18 September 2016 4	Internazionale	2–1	Juventus	Milan
18:00 CEST (UTC+02:00)	Medel (yellow card) 46'; Icardi 68'; Perišić 78'; Banega (yellow card) 84' (yellow-red card) 90'; Handanović (yellow card) 90+6'	Report	Lichtsteiner (yellow card) 19', (goal) 66'; Barzagli (yellow card) 29'; Asamoah (yellow card) 45+1'	Stadium: San Siro; Attendance: 76,484; Referee: Paolo Tagliavento

21 September 2016 5	Empoli	0–2	Internazionale	Empoli
20:45 CEST (UTC+02:00)	Maccarone (yellow card) 48'; João Mário (yellow card) 59'	Report	Murillo (yellow card) 3'; Icardi 10', 17'; Medel (yellow card) 23'; Miranda (yellow card) 25'	Stadium: Stadio Carlo Castellani; Attendance: 10,554; Referee: Marco Guida

25 September 2016 6	Internazionale	1–1	Bologna	Milan
15:00 CEST (UTC+02:00)	Perišić 37'	Report	Destro 14'; Gastaldello (yellow card) 21'; Da Costa (yellow card) 33'; Džemaili (yellow card) 39'; Pulgar (yellow card) 63'	Stadium: San Siro; Attendance: 42,274; Referee: Domenico Celi

2 October 2016 7	Roma	2–1	Internazionale	Rome
20:45 CEST (UTC+02:00)	Džeko 5'; Juan Jesus (yellow card) 64'; Icardi 76' (o.g.)	Report	Santon (yellow card) 24'; Ansaldi (yellow card) 36'; Banega 72'	Stadium: Stadio Olimpico; Attendance: 36,340; Referee: Luca Banti

16 October 2016 8	Internazionale	1–2	Cagliari	Milan
15:00 CEST (UTC+02:00)	João Mário (yellow card) 27', (goal) 56'	Report	Alves (yellow card) 25'; Sau (yellow card) 42'; Munari (yellow card) 61'; Melchiorri 71'; Tachtsidis (yellow card) 78'; Handanović 85' (o.g.); Barella (yellow card) 86'	Stadium: San Siro; Attendance: 43,757; Referee: Paolo Valeri

23 October 2016 9	Atalanta	2–1	Internazionale	Bergamo
15:00 CEST (UTC+02:00)	Masiello 10'; Konko (yellow card) 49'; Pinilla 88' (pen.), (yellow card) 89'	Report	Éder 50', (yellow card) 61'	Stadium: Stadio Atleti Azzurri d'Italia; Attendance: 18,159; Referee: Daniele Doveri

26 October 2016 10	Internazionale	2–1	Torino	Milan
20:45 CEST (UTC+02:00)	Icardi 35', 88'	Report	Valdifiori (yellow card) 28'; Belotti 63', (yellow card) 90+3'; López (yellow card) 80'; Benassi (yellow card) 90'	Stadium: San Siro; Attendance: 36,446; Referee: Davide Massa

30 October 2016 11	Sampdoria	1–0	Internazionale	Genoa
20:45 CET (UTC+01:00)	Quagliarella 44'; Sala (yellow card) 84'	Report	Ansaldi (yellow card) 74'; Miranda (yellow card) 75'; João Mário (yellow card) 83'	Stadium: Stadio Luigi Ferraris; Attendance: 20,906; Referee: Paolo Mazzoleni

6 November 2016 12	Internazionale	3–0	Crotone	Milan
18:00 CET (UTC+01:00)	Ranocchia (yellow card) 11'; Perišić 84'; Icardi 88' (pen.), 90+3'	Report	Mesbah (yellow card) 14'; Rosi (yellow card) 70'	Stadium: San Siro; Attendance: 40,626; Referee: Marco Guida

20 November 2016 13	Milan	2–2	Internazionale	Milan
20:45 CET (UTC+01:00)	Kucka (yellow card) 22'; De Sciglio (yellow card) 32'; Suso 42', 58'	Report	Kondogbia (yellow card) 19'; Ansaldi (yellow card) 49'; Candreva 53'; Jovetić (yellow card) 78'; Perišić 90+2', (yellow card) 90+3'	Stadium: San Siro; Attendance: 77,882; Referee: Paolo Tagliavento

28 November 2016 14	Internazionale	4–2	Fiorentina	Milan
21:00 CET (UTC+01:00)	Brozović 3', (yellow card) 55'; Candreva 9'; Icardi 19', 90+1'; Kondogbia (yellow card) 39'; Miranda (yellow card) 58'; Felipe Melo (yellow card) 76'; Ansaldi (yellow card) 84'	Report	Kalinić 37'; Salcedo (yellow card) 41'; Gonzalo (red card) 45+1'; Iličić 62'; Badelj (yellow card) 82'; Valero (yellow card) 83'	Stadium: San Siro; Attendance: 40,588; Referee: Antonio Damato

2 December 2016 15	Napoli	3–0	Internazionale	Naples
20:45 CET (UTC+01:00)	Zieliński 2', (yellow card) 45+2'; Hamšík 5'; Insigne 51'; Albiol (yellow card) 67'	Report	Ranocchia (yellow card) 5'; Ansaldi (yellow card) 45'; Brozović (yellow card) 82'	Stadium: Stadio San Paolo; Attendance: 32,341; Referee: Nicola Rizzoli

11 December 2016 16	Internazionale	2–0	Genoa	Milan
20:45 CET (UTC+01:00)	Brozović 38', 69'; Murillo (yellow card) 53'	Report	Ocampos (yellow card) 24'; Veloso (yellow card) 28'	Stadium: San Siro; Attendance: 33,788; Referee: Paolo Valeri

18 December 2016 17	Sassuolo	0–1	Internazionale	Reggio Emilia
12:30 CET (UTC+01:00)	Missiroli (yellow card) 61'	Report	Candreva 47'; João Mário (yellow card) 68'; Brozović (yellow card) 72'; Felipe Melo (yellow card) 75' (yellow-red card) 90+2'; Gabriel (yellow card) 90+4'	Stadium: Mapei Stadium – Città del Tricolore; Attendance: 15,221; Referee: Marco Di Bello

21 December 2016 18	Internazionale	3–0	Lazio	Milan
20:45 CET (UTC+01:00)	Banega 54'; Icardi 56', 65'; Ansaldi (yellow card) 57'; Miranda (yellow card) 76'	Report	Felipe Anderson (yellow card) 58'; Lulić (yellow card) 63'	Stadium: San Siro; Attendance: 37,868; Referee: Paolo Mazzoleni

8 January 2017 19	Udinese	1–2	Internazionale	Udine
12:30 CET (UTC+01:00)	Jankto 17', (yellow card) 75'; Théréau (yellow card) 74'; Fofana (yellow card) 86'	Report	Perišić 45+2', 87'; Kondogbia (yellow card) 65'; Brozović (yellow card) 86'	Stadium: Stadio Friuli; Attendance: 25,952; Referee: Daniele Doveri

14 January 2017 20	Internazionale	3–1	Chievo	Milan
20:45 CET (UTC+01:00)	Icardi 69'; Perišić 86'; Éder 90+3'	Report	Birsa (yellow card) 32'; Pellissier 34'; Radovanović (yellow card) 63'; Spolli (yellow card) 81'	Stadium: San Siro; Attendance: 34,255; Referee: Piero Giacomelli

22 January 2017 21	Palermo	0–1	Internazionale	Palermo
15:00 CET (UTC+01:00)	Nestorovski (yellow card) 19'; Goldaniga (yellow card) 43'; Gazzi (yellow card) 63' (yellow-red card) 90+5'; Balogh (yellow card) 78'; Diamanti (yellow card) 83'; Quaison (yellow card) 90+1'	Report	Ansaldi (yellow card) 22' (yellow-red card) 79'; D'Ambrosio (yellow card) 36'; João Mário 65'	Stadium: Stadio Renzo Barbera; Attendance: 16,436; Referee: Massimiliano Irrati

28 January 2017 22	Internazionale	3–0	Pescara	Milan
20:45 CET (UTC+01:00)	D'Ambrosio 23'; João Mário 43'; Nagatomo (yellow card) 54'; Éder 73'	Report	Biraghi (yellow card) 67'	Stadium: San Siro; Attendance: 38,968; Referee: Gianpaolo Calvarese

5 February 2017 23	Juventus	1–0	Internazionale	Turin
20:45 CET (UTC+01:00)	Pjanić (yellow card) 23'; Cuadrado 45', (yellow card) 64'; Mandžukić (yellow card) 47'; Khedira (yellow card) 65'; Chiellini (yellow card) 74'	Report	Candreva (yellow card) 7'; Medel (yellow card) 43'; Handanović (yellow card) 90+4'; Perišić (red card) 90+4'	Stadium: Juventus Stadium; Attendance: 41,408; Referee: Nicola Rizzoli

12 February 2017 24	Internazionale	2–0	Empoli	Milan
15:00 CET (UTC+01:00)	Éder 14'; Kondogbia (yellow card) 45+1'; Candreva 54'	Report	El Kaddouri (yellow card) 41'; Dimarco (yellow card) 49'	Stadium: San Siro; Attendance: 40,868; Referee: Domenico Celi

19 February 2017 25	Bologna	0–1	Internazionale	Bologna
12:30 CET (UTC+01:00)	Torosidis (yellow card) 84'	Report	Miranda (yellow card) 67'; Gabriel 81', (yellow card) 82'; D'Ambrosio (yellow card) 88'; Banega (yellow card) 90+1'	Stadium: Stadio Renato Dall'Ara; Attendance: 28,006; Referee: Paolo Mazzoleni

26 February 2017 26	Internazionale	1–3	Roma	Milan
20:45 CET (UTC+01:00)	Perišić (yellow card) 6'; Icardi 81'; Murillo (yellow card) 83'	Report	Nainggolan 12', 56'; De Rossi (yellow card) 40'; Fazio (yellow card) 83'; Perotti 85' (pen.)	Stadium: San Siro; Attendance: 58,652; Referee: Paolo Tagliavento

5 March 2017 27	Cagliari	1–5	Internazionale	Cagliari
15:00 CET (UTC+01:00)	Borriello 42'; Barella (yellow card) 55'; Ioniță (yellow card) 72'	Report	Perišić 34', 47'; Banega 39'; Icardi 67' (pen.); Gagliardini 89'	Stadium: Stadio Sant'Elia; Attendance: 15,649; Referee: Marco Di Bello

12 March 2017 28	Internazionale	7–1	Atalanta	Milan
15:00 CET (UTC+01:00)	Icardi 17', 23' (pen.), 26', (yellow card) 28'; Banega 31', 34', 68'; Gagliardini 52', (yellow card) 76'; Ansaldi (yellow card) 61'	Report	Toloi (yellow card) 15'; Berisha (yellow card) 23'; Zukanović (yellow card) 25'; Freuler 42'; Kurtić (yellow card) 71'	Stadium: San Siro; Attendance: 59,359; Referee: Massimiliano Irrati

18 March 2017 29	Torino	2–2	Internazionale	Turin
18:00 CET (UTC+01:00)	Baselli 33'; Acquah 59'; López (yellow card) 90+6'	Report	Kondogbia 27'; Candreva 62'	Stadium: Stadio Olimpico Grande Torino; Attendance: 26,500; Referee: Luca Banti

3 April 2017 30	Internazionale	1–2	Sampdoria	Milan
20:45 CEST (UTC+02:00)	D'Ambrosio 35'; Brozović (yellow card) 85'; Miranda (yellow card) 88'	Report	Schick 50'; Quagliarella 85' (pen.)	Stadium: San Siro; Attendance: 47,043; Referee: Domenico Celi

9 April 2017 31	Crotone	2–1	Internazionale	Crotone
15:00 CEST (UTC+02:00)	Falcinelli 18' (pen.), 22'; Martella (yellow card) 46'; Ceccherini (yellow card) 47'; Acosty (yellow card) 90'; Capezzi (yellow card) 90+8'	Report	Palacio (yellow card) 47'; Banega (yellow card) 51'; D'Ambrosio 65'	Stadium: Stadio Ezio Scida; Attendance: 13,967; Referee: Marco Guida

15 April 2017 32	Internazionale	2–2	Milan	Milan
12:30 CEST (UTC+02:00)	Candreva 36', (yellow card) 37'; Icardi 44'; Handanović (yellow card) 87'; Gagliardini (yellow card) 90+3'	Report	Kucka (yellow card) 34'; Romagnoli 83'; Locatelli (yellow card) 90+5'; Zapata 90+7'	Stadium: San Siro; Attendance: 78,328; Referee: Daniele Orsato

22 April 2017 33	Fiorentina	5–4	Internazionale	Florence
20:45 CEST (UTC+02:00)	Vecino 23', 64'; Astori 62', (yellow card) 75'; Babacar 70', 79'; Sánchez (yellow card) 78'; Cristóforo (yellow card) 90+5'	Report	Perišić 29'; Icardi 34', 88', 90+1'; Handanović (yellow card) 90+5'	Stadium: Stadio Artemio Franchi; Attendance: 30,011; Referee: Paolo Valeri

30 April 2017 34	Internazionale	0–1	Napoli	Milan
20:45 CEST (UTC+02:00)	Murillo (yellow card) 52'; Brozović (yellow card) 56'	Report	Callejón 43'; Koulibaly (yellow card) 65'; Rog (yellow card) 73'	Stadium: San Siro; Attendance: 57,076; Referee: Gianluca Rocchi

7 May 2017 35	Genoa	1–0	Internazionale	Genoa
15:00 CEST (UTC+02:00)	Lazović (yellow card) 37'; Biraschi (yellow card) 61'; Pandev 70'; Burdisso (yellow card) 87'; Rigoni (yellow card) 90+2'	Report	Nagatomo (yellow card) 53'; Medel (yellow card) 77'; Kondogbia (red card) 89'	Stadium: Stadio Luigi Ferraris; Attendance: 20,980; Referee: Antonio Damato

14 May 2017 36	Internazionale	1–2	Sassuolo	Milan
12:30 CEST (UTC+02:00)	Éder 70', (yellow card) 84'; Ansaldi (yellow card) 74'; Gabriel (yellow card) 90+3'	Report	Iemmello 36', 50'; Peluso (yellow card) 69'	Stadium: San Siro; Attendance: 42,222; Referee: Davide Masse

21 May 2017 37	Lazio	1–3	Internazionale	Rome
20:45 CEST (UTC+02:00)	Keita 18' (pen.), (yellow card) 61' (yellow-red card) 66'; Hoedt (yellow card) 46'; Lulić (yellow card) 71' (yellow-red card) 78'; Lombardi (yellow card) 80'	Report	Murillo (yellow card) 17'; Andreolli 31'; Hoedt 37' (o.g.); Éder (yellow card) 48', (goal) 74'	Stadium: Stadio Olimpico; Attendance: 30,000; Referee: Marco Di Bello

28 May 2017 38	Internazionale	5–2	Udinese	Milan
20:45 CEST (UTC+02:00)	Éder 5', 54'; Perišić 18'; Brozović 36'; D'Ambrosio (yellow card) 63'; Angella 78' (o.g.); Sainsbury (yellow card) 83'	Report	Widmer (yellow card) 71'; Balić 76'; Zapata 90+2'	Stadium: San Siro; Attendance: 36,689; Referee: Aleandro Di Parolo

=== Coppa Italia ===
17 January 2017 Round of 16	Internazionale	3–2 (a.e.t.)	Bologna	Milan
21:00 CET (UTC+01:00)	Murillo 34'; Palacio 39'; D'Ambrosio (yellow card) 63'; Candreva 98', (yellow card) 109'; Medel (yellow card) 105+1'	Report	Džemaili 43'; Donsah (yellow card) 52', (goal) 73'; Di Francesco (yellow card) 102'	Stadium: San Siro; Attendance: 23,478; Referee: Maurizio Mariani

31 January 2017 Quarter-finals	Internazionale	1–2	Lazio	Milan
20:45 CET (UTC+01:00)	D'Ambrosio (yellow card) 45'; Miranda (red card) 54'; Brozović 84', (yellow card) 90+1'	Report	Felipe Anderson 20'; Hoedt (yellow card) 44'; Radu (yellow card) 45' (yellow-red card) 76'; Lulić (yellow card) 45+2'; Parolo (yellow card) 52'; Biglia 56' (pen.); Patric (yellow card) 79'	Stadium: San Siro; Attendance: 31,757; Referee: Marco Guida

=== UEFA Europa League ===
==== Group stage ====
Pos	Team	Pld	W	D	L	GF	GA	GD	Pts	Qualification	SPP	HBS	SOU	INT
1	(Czech Republic) Sparta Prague	6	4	0	2	8	6	+2	12	Advance to knockout phase	—	2–0	1–0	3–1
2	(Israel) Hapoel Be'er Sheva	6	2	2	2	6	6	0	8	Advance to knockout phase	0–1	—	0–0	3–2
3	(England) Southampton	6	2	2	2	6	4	+2	8		3–0	1–1	—	2–1
4	(Italy) Internazionale	6	2	0	4	7	11	−4	6		2–1	0–2	1–0	—

Source: UEFA
Rules for classification: Group stage tiebreakers

15 September 2016 1	Internazionale (Italy)	0–2	(Israel) Hapoel Be'er Sheva	Milan, Italy
21:05 CEST (UTC+02:00)	Murillo (yellow card) 53'	Report	Buzaglo (yellow card) 36', (goal) 69'; Bitton (yellow card) 43'; Vítor 54'; Turjeman (yellow card) 86'; Taha (yellow card) 90+1'	Stadium: San Siro; Attendance: 16,778; Referee: Jakob Kehlet (Denmark)

29 September 2016 2	Sparta Prague (Czech Republic)	3–1	(Italy) Internazionale	Prague, Czech Republic
19:00 CEST (UTC+02:00)	V. Kadlec 7', 25', (yellow card) 80'; Frýdek (yellow card) 58'; Holek 76'; Juliš (yellow card) 78'; Pulkrab (yellow card) 90+2'	Report	Ranocchia (yellow card) 46' (yellow-red card) 75'; Palacio 71'	Stadium: Generali Arena; Attendance: 14,651; Referee: Artur Soares Dias (Portugal)

20 October 2016 3	Internazionale (Italy)	1–0	(England) Southampton	Milan, Italy
19:00 CEST (UTC+02:00)	Brozović (yellow card) 59' (yellow-red card) 77'; Candreva 67'; Medel (yellow card) 84'	Report	Højbjerg (yellow card) 85'	Stadium: San Siro; Attendance: 26,719; Referee: Gediminas Mažeika (Lithuania)

3 November 2016 4	Southampton (England)	2–1	(Italy) Internazionale	Southampton, England
21:05 CEST (UTC+02:00)	Van Dijk 64'; Nagatomo 70' (o.g.); Ward-Prowse (yellow card) 90'	Report	Icardi 33'; Candreva (yellow card) 45+3'; Medel (yellow card) 52'; Miranda (yellow card) 90'	Stadium: St Mary's Stadium; Attendance: 30,389; Referee: Paweł Gil (Poland)

24 November 2016 5	Hapoel Be'er Sheva (Israel)	3–2	(Italy) Internazionale	Be'er Sheva, Israel
19:00 CEST (UTC+02:00)	Korhut (yellow card) 19'; Maranhão (yellow card) 43', (goal) 58'; Bitton (yellow card) 55'; Nwakaeme (yellow card) 64', (goal) 71' (pen.); Sahar 90+3'	Report	Icardi 13'; Brozović 25'; Handanović (yellow card) 45' (yellow-red card) 69'; Nagatomo (yellow card) 87'	Stadium: Turner Stadium; Attendance: 15,973; Referee: Xavier Estrada Fernández (Spain)

8 December 2016 6	Internazionale (Italy)	2–1	(Czech Republic) Sparta Prague	Milan, Italy
21:05 CEST (UTC+02:00)	Éder 23', 90'; Ranocchia (yellow card) 73'	Report	Mareček 54'	Stadium: San Siro; Attendance: 14,856; Referee: Bart Vertenten (Belgium)

== Statistics ==
=== Appearances and goals ===
No.	Pos	Nat	Player	Total		Serie A		Coppa Italia		Europa League	
No.	Pos	Nat	Player	Apps	Goals	Apps	Goals	Apps	Goals	Apps	Goals
Goalkeepers
1	GK	(Slovenia) SLO	Samir Handanović	43	0	37	0	1	0	5	0
30	GK	(Argentina) ARG	Juan Pablo Carrizo	4	0	1	0	1	0	1+1	0
Defenders
2	DF	(Italy) ITA	Marco Andreolli	7	1	4+2	1	0	0	1	0
15	DF	(Argentina) ARG	Cristian Ansaldi	26	0	17+4	0	2	0	1+2	0
20	DF	(Australia) AUS	Trent Sainsbury	1	0	0+1	0	0	0	0	0
21	DF	(Italy) ITA	Davide Santon	15	0	11+3	0	0	0	1	0
24	DF	(Colombia) COL	Jeison Murillo	34	1	23+4	0	2	1	5	0
25	DF	(Brazil) BRA	Miranda	35	0	32	0	1	0	2	0
33	DF	(Italy) ITA	Danilo D'Ambrosio	39	3	32	3	2	0	4+1	0
55	DF	(Japan) JPN	Yuto Nagatomo	20	0	11+5	0	0	0	4	0
Midfielders
5	MF	(Italy) ITA	Roberto Gagliardini	19	2	18	2	1	0	0	0
6	MF	(Portugal) POR	João Mário	32	3	22+8	3	1+1	0	0	0
7	MF	(France) FRA	Geoffrey Kondogbia	26	1	20+4	1	2	0	0	0
17	MF	(Chile) CHI	Gary Medel	31	0	26	0	1+1	0	3	0
19	MF	(Argentina) ARG	Éver Banega	33	6	20+8	6	1	0	3+1	0
44	MF	(Croatia) CRO	Ivan Perišić	41	11	30+5	11	1	0	1+4	0
77	MF	(Croatia) CRO	Marcelo Brozović	28	6	20+3	4	1+1	1	3	1
87	MF	(Italy) ITA	Antonio Candreva	45	8	36+2	6	1+1	1	4+1	1
Forwards
8	FW	(Argentina) ARG	Rodrigo Palacio	20	2	3+12	0	2	1	3	1
9	FW	(Argentina) ARG	Mauro Icardi	41	26	34	24	0+2	0	3+2	2
11	FW	(France) FRA	Jonathan Biabiany	4	0	0+1	0	0	0	2+1	0
23	FW	(Italy) ITA	Éder	40	10	13+20	8	1	0	5+1	2
93	FW	(France) FRA	Axel Mohamed Bakayoko	1	0	0	0	0	0	0+1	0
96	FW	(Brazil) BRA	Gabriel	10	1	0+9	1	1	0	0	0
Players transferred out during the season
5	MF	(Brazil) BRA	Felipe Melo	10	0	1+4	0	0	0	4+1	0
10	FW	(Montenegro) MNE	Stevan Jovetić	5	0	0+5	0	0	0	0	0
13	DF	(Italy) ITA	Andrea Ranocchia	9	0	5	0	0	0	4	0
27	MF	(Ivory Coast) CIV	Assane Gnoukouri	8	0	0+4	0	0	0	3+1	0
95	DF	(Belgium) BEL	Senna Miangue	6	0	1+2	0	1	0	2	0

Last updated: 28 May 2017
Source: Competitions

=== Goalscorers ===
Rank	No.	Pos	Nat	Name	Serie A	Coppa Italia	UEFA EL	Total
1	9	FW	(Argentina)	Mauro Icardi	24	0	2	26
2	44	MF	(Croatia)	Ivan Perišić	11	0	0	11
3	23	FW	(Italy)	Éder	8	0	2	10
4	87	MF	(Italy)	Antonio Candreva	6	1	1	8
5	19	MF	(Argentina)	Éver Banega	6	0	0	6
5	77	MF	(Croatia)	Marcelo Brozović	4	1	1	6
7	6	MF	(Portugal)	João Mário	3	0	0	3
7	33	DF	(Italy)	Danilo D'Ambrosio	3	0	0	3
9	5	MF	(Italy)	Roberto Gagliardini	2	0	0	2
9	8	FW	(Argentina)	Rodrigo Palacio	0	1	1	2
11	2	DF	(Italy)	Marco Andreolli	1	0	0	1
11	7	MF	(France)	Geoffrey Kondogbia	1	0	0	1
11	24	DF	(Colombia)	Jeison Murillo	0	1	0	1
11	96	FW	(Brazil)	Gabriel	1	0	0	1
Own goal					2	0	0	2
Totals					77	4	7	88

Last updated: 28 May 2017

=== Clean sheets ===
Rank	No.	Pos	Nat	Name	Serie A	Coppa Italia	UEFA EL	Total
1	1	GK	(Slovenia)	Samir Handanović	9	0	1	10
Totals					9	0	1	10

Last updated: 28 May 2017

=== Disciplinary record ===
No.	Pos	Nat	Player	Serie A			Coppa Italia			UEFA EL			Total		
No.	Pos	Nat	Player	Booked	(yellow card) (yellow-red card)	Sent off (straight red)	Booked	(yellow card) (yellow-red card)	Sent off (straight red)	Booked	(yellow card) (yellow-red card)	Sent off (straight red)	Booked	(yellow card) (yellow-red card)	Sent off (straight red)
1	GK	(Slovenia)	Samir Handanović	4	0	0	0	0	0	0	1	0	4	1	0
13	DF	(Italy)	Andrea Ranocchia	2	0	0	0	0	0	1	1	0	3	1	0
15	DF	(Argentina)	Cristian Ansaldi	8	1	0	0	0	0	0	0	0	8	1	0
20	DF	(Australia)	Trent Sainsbury	1	0	0	0	0	0	0	0	0	1	0	0
21	DF	(Italy)	Davide Santon	1	0	0	0	0	0	0	0	0	1	0	0
24	DF	(Colombia)	Jeison Murillo	6	0	0	0	0	0	1	0	0	7	0	0
25	DF	(Brazil)	Miranda	6	0	0	0	0	1	1	0	0	7	0	1
33	DF	(Italy)	Danilo D'Ambrosio	4	0	0	2	0	0	0	0	0	6	0	0
55	DF	(Japan)	Yuto Nagatomo	2	0	0	0	0	0	1	0	0	3	0	0
5	MF	(Brazil)	Felipe Melo	1	1	0	0	0	0	0	0	0	1	1	0
5	MF	(Italy)	Roberto Gagliardini	2	0	0	0	0	0	0	0	0	2	0	0
6	MF	(Portugal)	João Mário	5	0	0	0	0	0	0	0	0	5	0	0
7	MF	(France)	Geoffrey Kondogbia	5	0	1	0	0	0	0	0	0	5	0	1
17	MF	(Chile)	Gary Medel	5	0	0	1	0	0	2	0	0	8	0	0
19	MF	(Argentina)	Éver Banega	2	1	0	0	0	0	0	0	0	2	1	0
44	MF	(Croatia)	Ivan Perišić	2	0	1	0	0	0	0	0	0	2	0	1
77	MF	(Croatia)	Marcelo Brozović	7	0	0	1	0	0	0	1	0	8	1	0
87	MF	(Italy)	Antonio Candreva	2	0	0	1	0	0	1	0	0	4	0	0
8	FW	(Argentina)	Rodrigo Palacio	1	0	0	0	0	0	0	0	0	1	0	0
9	FW	(Argentina)	Mauro Icardi	1	0	0	0	0	0	0	0	0	1	0	0
10	FW	(Montenegro)	Stevan Jovetić	1	0	0	0	0	0	0	0	0	1	0	0
23	FW	(Italy)	Éder	3	0	0	0	0	0	0	0	0	3	0	0
96	FW	(Brazil)	Gabriel	3	0	0	0	0	0	0	0	0	3	0	0
Totals				74	3	2	5	0	1	7	3	0	86	6	3

Last updated: 28 May 2017
