= 2014–15 Inter Milan season =

Inter Milan
2014–15 season
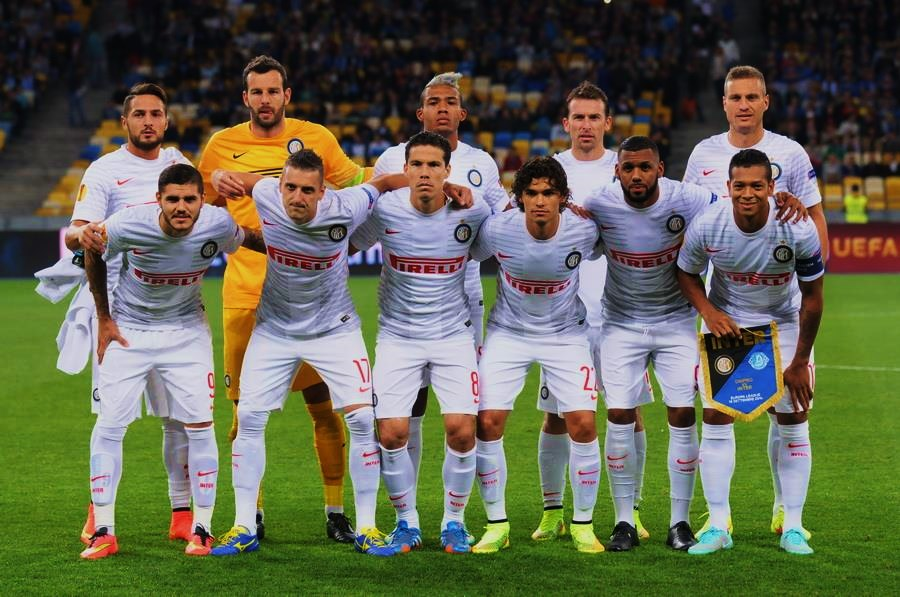
- Inter Milan players line up before facing Dnipro Dnipropetrovsk in the UEFA Europa League, 18 September 2014
- President: Erick Thohir
- Manager: Walter Mazzarri (until 9 November); Roberto Mancini (from 10 November)
- Stadium: San Siro
- Serie A: 8th
- Coppa Italia: Quarter-finals
- Europa League: Round of 16
- Top goalscorer: League: Mauro Icardi (22); All: Mauro Icardi (27)
- Highest home attendance: 74,022 vs Milan (19 April 2015, Serie A)
- Lowest home attendance: 27,314 vs Hellas Verona (9 November 2014, Serie A)
- Average home league attendance: 33,669
Home colours	Away colours	Third colours

The 2014–15 season was Football Club Internazionale Milano's 106th in existence and 99th consecutive season in the top flight of Italian football. The team took part at Serie A, Coppa Italia and UEFA Europa League.

== Season overview ==
During the summer of 2014, Inter was left by the main protagonists of the 2009–10 Treble: the captain Javier Zanetti, Walter Samuel, Esteban Cambiasso and Diego Milito. Therefore, the only left of that season were Joel Obi and Rene Krhin, both returning from loan. The renewal signed by Walter Mazzarri added to the arrivals of new men (Gary Medel, Pablo Osvaldo, Yann M'Vila, Dodô and Nemanja Vidić) and several years without trophies helped the fans to predict a "year zero" for their club. The new era started on 20 August when, in the first leg of the Europa League play-off, Inter beat Stjarnan 3–0. The second leg match resulted in another large win of 6–0: Kovačić unlocked his record, scoring half of the goals. The results of Serie A were - instead - disappointing, except the 7–0 win over Sassuolo. Inter lost with Cagliari and Fiorentina, suffering a total of seven goals. Mazzarri put his job at risk due to a quarrel with Massimo Moratti, stating that "he didn't have time to waste". Despite a good European campaign, with eight points collected in four matches of the group stage, the coach was fired after a 2–2 draw with Hellas Verona. Erick Thohir bet on Roberto Mancini, who coached the side from 2004 to 2008 winning the Italian title for three consecutive years. Mancini made his debut in the Derby della Madonnina (1–1), then reached the European knockout phase on his fiftieth birthday. However, the gap with other opponents was unattainable at mid-season.

Mancini tried to resolve the problem of a team not built by him with new purchases (Podolski, Shaqiri and Brozović) and a policy based on young players such as Pușcaș, Bonazzoli, Gnoukouri, Donkor and Dimarco: however Inter had poor results, being defeated in both cups (Coppa Italia and Europa League). The attempt of getting a placement useful for European competitions failed in final matches, sticking Inter at eighth position. Icardi's goals - that crowned him Serie A top scorer - were not enough to save the season.

== Kit ==
Supplier: Nike / Sponsor: Pirelli

Home	Home alt.	Home alt. 2	Home alt. 3	Away	Away alt.	Third

=== Kit information ===
The new home kit is black with a thin blue pinstripe and also boasts a new enlarged and enhanced club crest. The club crest – in the version with the star on the top – will be present exclusively on the jersey. The shirt has a tailored black collar with a thin blue trim, which has a button at the top, and a placket with a hidden button. Inside the back of the neck is a pennant tab featuring the Saint George’s cross to represent the city of Milan’s coat of arms. On the back of the neck is "Inter" in a specially designed font, which has been used by the Nerrazzurri's most committed fans on flags and banners inside the San Siro since the 1970s. The new home shorts are black with a thin blue stripe along each side, and the new home socks are black with a wide tonal stripe of chevrons on the back. The new away kit has a ribbed crew neck collar and is white with a tonal light grey graphic on the front consisting of lines which create a Saint George's cross from the city of Milan's coat of arms. Inside the back of the neck is a pennant tab featuring the proud message "Milano E’ Solo Inter" (Milan is only Inter). It is written in a specially designed font. On the back of the neck is another Saint George's cross to once again proudly represent the city of Milan's coat of arms. The new away kit is completed by white shorts and socks.

== Players ==
=== Squad information ===
As of 2 February 2015

Squad no.	Name	Nationality	Position	Date of birth (age)
Goalkeepers
1	Samir Handanović	(Slovenia)	GK	14 July 1984 (aged 30)
18	Juan Pablo Carrizo	(Argentina)	GK	6 May 1984 (aged 31)
46	Tommaso Berni	(Italy)	GK	6 March 1983 (aged 32)
Defenders
2	Jonathan	(Brazil)	RB/RM	27 February 1986 (aged 29)
5	Juan Jesus	(Brazil)	CB/LB	10 June 1991 (aged 24)
6	Marco Andreolli	(Italy)	CB	10 June 1986 (aged 29)
14	Hugo Campagnaro	(Argentina)	CB/RB	27 June 1980 (aged 35)
15	Nemanja Vidić	(Serbia)	CB	21 October 1981 (aged 33)
21	Davide Santon	(Italy)	RB/LB	2 January 1991 (aged 24)
22	Dodô	(Brazil)	RB/LB	6 February 1992 (aged 23)
23	Andrea Ranocchia (captain)	(Italy)	CB	16 February 1988 (aged 27)
26	Felipe	(Brazil)	CB	31 July 1984 (aged 30)
33	Danilo D'Ambrosio	(Italy)	RB/LB/CB	9 September 1988 (aged 26)
54	Isaar Donkor	(Ghana)	CB	15 August 1995 (aged 19)
55	Yuto Nagatomo (vice-captain)	(Japan)	RB/LB	12 September 1986 (aged 28)
93	Federico Dimarco	(Italy)	LB/LM	10 November 1997 (aged 17)
Midfielders
10	Mateo Kovačić	(Croatia)	CM/AM/DM	6 May 1994 (aged 21)
13	Fredy Guarín	(Colombia)	CM/DM/AM	30 June 1986 (aged 29)
17	Zdravko Kuzmanović	(Serbia)	CM	22 September 1987 (aged 27)
18	Gary Medel	(Chile)	DM/CM/CB	3 August 1987 (aged 27)
20	Joel Obi	(Nigeria)	CM	22 May 1991 (aged 24)
27	Assane Gnoukouri	(Ivory Coast)	CM/DM	28 September 1996 (aged 18)
29	Gaston Camara	(Guinea)	CM	31 March 1996 (aged 19)
77	Marcelo Brozović	(Croatia)	AM/CM/DM	16 November 1992 (aged 22)
88	Hernanes	(Brazil)	AM/CM/DM	29 May 1985 (aged 30)
Forwards
8	Rodrigo Palacio	(Argentina)	SS	5 February 1982 (aged 33)
9	Mauro Icardi	(Argentina)	ST	19 February 1993 (aged 22)
11	Lukas Podolski	(Germany)	SS	4 June 1985 (aged 30)
28	George Pușcaș	(Romania)	ST	8 April 1996 (aged 19)
91	Xherdan Shaqiri	(Switzerland)	LW/RW/AM	10 October 1991 (aged 23)
97	Federico Bonazzoli	(Italy)	ST	21 May 1997 (aged 18)
Players transferred out during the season
7	Dani Osvaldo	(Italy)	ST	12 January 1986 (aged 29)
19	Rubén Botta	(Argentina)	AM	31 January 1990 (aged 25)
44	Rene Krhin	(Slovenia)	CM	21 May 1990 (aged 25)
90	Yann M'Vila	(France)	DM	29 June 1990 (aged 25)

== Pre-season and friendlies ==
=== Pinzolo training camp ===
16 July 2014 Friendly	Inter	6–1	Trentino Select XI	Pinzolo
17:00 CEST (UTC+02:00)	Jonathan 8'; Icardi 23', 26'; Bonazzoli 42', 55'; Juan 86'	Report	Marioti 71'	Stadium: Stadio La Pineta; Attendance: 1,600; Referee: Spadaccini

20 July 2014 Friendly	Inter	1–0	Prato	Pinzolo
16:00 CEST (UTC+02:00)	Mbaye 68'	Report		Stadium: Stadio La Pineta; Attendance: 1,600; Referee: Stefano Denis

=== International Champions Cup ===
26 July 2014 Match 1	Real Madrid	1–1 (2–3 p)	Inter	Berkeley, United States
15:00 PDT (UTC−07:00)	Bale 10'	Report	Icardi 68' (pen.)	Stadium: California Memorial Stadium; Attendance: 62,583; Referee: Ricardo Salazar (United States)
	Penalties
	Isco (penalty missed); Vázquez (penalty scored); Nacho (penalty scored); Illarramendi (penalty missed); Mascarell (penalty missed)		(penalty scored) Vidić; (penalty missed) Nagatomo; (penalty missed) M'Vila; (penalty scored) Juan; (penalty scored) Icardi

29 July 2014 Match 2	Manchester United	0–0 (5–3 p)	Inter	Landover, United States
19:00 EDT (UTC−04:00)		Report		Stadium: FedExField; Attendance: 61,238; Referee: Edvin Jurisevic (United States)
	Penalties
	Young (penalty scored); Hernández (penalty scored); Cleverley (penalty scored); Kagawa (penalty scored); Fletcher (penalty scored)		(penalty scored) Guarín; (penalty scored) M'Vila; (penalty scored) Taïder; (penalty missed) Andreolli

2 August 2014 Match 3	Inter	2–0	Roma	Philadelphia, United States
13:00 EDT (UTC−04:00)	Vidić 45'; Nagatomo 69'	Report		Stadium: Lincoln Financial Field; Attendance: 12,169

=== Other friendlies ===
10 August 2014 Friendly	Eintracht Frankfurt	3–1	Inter	Frankfurt, Germany
15:30 CEST (UTC+02:00)	Piazon 26'; Seferovic 33', 39'	Report	Botta 25'	Stadium: Commerzbank-Arena; Attendance: 50,000; Referee: Christian Dingert (Germany)

14 August 2014 Friendly	PAOK	0–0	Inter	Thessaloniki, Greece
19:30 CEST (UTC+02:00)		Report		Stadium: Toumba Stadium; Referee: Aggelos Tsironis (Greece)

30 December 2014 Friendly	Paris Saint-Germain	1–0	Inter	Marrakesh, Morocco
20:00 CET (UTC+01:00)	Cabaye 57'	Report		Stadium: Stade de Marrakech; Referee: Jiyed Redouane

== Competitions ==
=== Overview ===
Competition	First match	Last match	Starting round	Final position	Record							
Competition	First match	Last match	Starting round	Final position	Pld	W	D	L	GF	GA	GD	Win %
Serie A	31 August 2014	31 May 2015	Matchday 1	8th	38	14	13	11	59	48	+11	36.84
Coppa Italia	21 January 2015	4 February 2015	Round of 16	Quarter-finals	2	1	0	1	2	1	+1	50.00
Europa League	20 August 2014	13 March 2015	Play-off	Round of 16	12	6	4	2	21	10	+11	50.00
Total					52	21	17	14	82	59	+23	40.38

Last updated: 31 May 2015
Source: Serie A statistics, Coppa Italia statistics, UEFA Europa League statistics

=== Serie A ===
==== League table ====
Pos	Team	Pld	W	D	L	GF	GA	GD	Pts	Qualification or relegation
6	Genoa (Note: Genoa failed to obtain a UEFA licence from Italian Football Federation. Therefore, they were barred to participate in European competitions. Genoa appealed the decision, but the appeal was denied.)	38	16	11	11	62	47	+15	59	
7	Sampdoria	38	13	17	8	48	42	+6	56	Qualification for the Europa League third qualifying round (Note: Since the winners of the 2014–15 Coppa Italia (Juventus) qualified for European competition based on league position, the spot awarded to the cup winners (Europa League group stage) was passed to the fifth-placed team and the spot originally meant for the fifth-placed team (Europa League third qualifying round) was given to the highest placed team that has obtained an UEFA licence and not already qualified for European competition.)
8	Internazionale	38	14	13	11	59	48	+11	55	
9	Torino	38	14	12	12	48	45	+3	54	
10	Milan	38	13	13	12	56	50	+6	52	

Source: 2014–15 Serie A, 2014-15 Serie A classification.
Rules for classification: 1) points; 2) head-to-head points; 3) head-to-head goal difference; 4) goal difference; 5) number of goals scored; 6) draw. (Head-to-head record is applied for clubs with the same number of points only once all matches between said clubs have been played.).

==== Results summary ====
Overall								Home						Away					
Pld	W	D	L	GF	GA	GD	Pts	W	D	L	GF	GA	GD	W	D	L	GF	GA	GD
38	14	13	11	59	48	+11	55	7	7	5	33	23	+10	7	6	6	26	25	+1

Last updated: 31 May 2015.
Source: Competitive matches

==== Results by round ====
Round	1	2	3	4	5	6	7	8	9	10	11	12	13	14	15	16	17	18	19	20	21	22	23	24	25	26	27	28	29	30	31	32	33	34	35	36	37	38
Ground	A	H	A	H	H	A	H	A	H	A	H	A	A	H	A	H	A	H	A	H	A	H	A	A	H	A	H	A	H	A	H	H	A	H	A	H	A	H
Result	D	W	D	W	L	L	D	W	W	L	D	D	L	L	W	D	D	W	D	L	L	W	W	W	L	D	D	L	D	W	D	W	W	D	W	L	L	W
Position	13	4	4	4	5	10	10	8	8	9	9	9	12	12	11	11	11	9	9	10	13	10	10	8	9	9	7	9	9	8	10	9	9	8	7	8	8	8

Updated to match(es) played on 31 May 2015. Source: Competitive matches
A = Away; H = Home; W = Win; D = Draw; L = Loss

==== Matches ====
31 August 2014 1	Torino	0–0	Inter	Turin
20:45 CEST (UTC+02:00)	Maksimović (yellow card) 42'	Report	Hernanes (yellow card) 67'; Vidić (red card) 90+3'	Stadium: Stadio Olimpico di Torino; Attendance: 25,824; Referee: Daniele Doveri

14 September 2014 2	Inter	7–0	Sassuolo	Milan
15:00 CEST (UTC+02:00)	Icardi 3', 30', 53'; Kovačić 21'; Osvaldo 43', 72'; Guarín 74'	Report	Ariaudo (yellow card) 33'; Berardi (red card) 60'	Stadium: San Siro; Attendance: 34,549; Referee: Gianpaolo Calvarese

21 September 2014 3	Palermo	1–1	Inter	Palermo
20:45 CEST (UTC+02:00)	Vázquez 3'; Rigoni (yellow card) 44'; Morganella (yellow card) 48'	Report	Juan (yellow card) 33'; Medel (yellow card) 36'; Kovačić 42'; Ranocchia (yellow card) 80'; Dodô (yellow card) 90+1'	Stadium: Stadio Renzo Barbera; Attendance: 18,292; Referee: Paolo Valeri

24 September 2014 4	Inter	2–0	Atalanta	Milan
20:45 CEST (UTC+02:00)	Osvaldo 40'; Kovačić (yellow card) 74'; Hernanes 87'	Report	Carmona (yellow card) 28'; Benalouane (yellow card) 29'; Boakye (yellow card) 89'	Stadium: San Siro; Attendance: 29,535; Referee: Andrea Gervasoni

28 September 2014 5	Inter	1–4	Cagliari	Milan
15:00 CEST (UTC+02:00)	Osvaldo 18'; Nagatomo (yellow card) 25' (yellow-red card) 28'; Guarín (yellow card) 82'	Report	Sau 10', (yellow card) 45'; Ekdal 29', 34', 44'; Rossettini (yellow card) 45'; Balzano (yellow card) 82'	Stadium: San Siro; Attendance: 36,925; Referee: Luca Banti

5 October 2014 6	Fiorentina	3–0	Inter	Florence
20:45 CEST (UTC+02:00)	Babacar 7'; Cuadrado 19'; Kurtić (yellow card) 53'; Tomović 76', (yellow card) 78'	Report	Ranocchia (yellow card) 20'; D'Ambrosio (yellow card) 52'; Osvaldo (yellow card) 70'	Stadium: Stadio Artemio Franchi; Attendance: 34,279; Referee: Paolo Tagliavento

19 October 2014 7	Inter	2–2	Napoli	Milan
20:45 CEST (UTC+02:00)	Hernanes (yellow card) 37', (goal) 90+1'; Guarín 82'; Juan (yellow card) 85'	Report	Britos (yellow card) 45'; Higuaín (yellow card) 70'; Jorginho (yellow card) 73'; Callejón 79', 90'	Stadium: San Siro; Attendance: 40,383; Referee: Daniele Orsato

26 October 2014 8	Cesena	0–1	Inter	Cesena
18:00 CET (UTC+01:00)	Garritano (yellow card) 13'; Leali (red card) 30'; Giorgi (yellow card) 36'; Volta (yellow card) 61'; Rodríguez (yellow card) 86'; Cascione (yellow card) 90'	Report	Icardi 32' (pen.); Campagnaro (yellow card) 53'	Stadium: Stadio Dino Manuzzi; Attendance: 22,917; Referee: Paolo Mazzoleni

29 October 2014 9	Inter	1–0	Sampdoria	Milan
20:45 CET (UTC+01:00)	Kovačić (yellow card) 23'; Medel (yellow card) 81'; Icardi 90' (pen.)	Report	Gastaldello (yellow card) 21'; Palombo (yellow card) 48'	Stadium: San Siro; Attendance: 28,057; Referee: Carmine Russo

2 November 2014 10	Parma	2–0	Inter	Parma
20:45 CET (UTC+01:00)	De Ceglie 5', 76'; Costa (yellow card) 12'; Lucarelli (yellow card) 18'; Mirante (yellow card) 70'	Report	Dodô (yellow card) 85'	Stadium: Stadio Ennio Tardini; Attendance: 13,539; Referee: Nicola Rizzoli

9 November 2014 11	Inter	2–2	Hellas Verona	Milan
20:45 CET (UTC+01:00)	Icardi 18', 48'; Medel (yellow card) 44' (yellow-red card) 51'	Report	Toni 10'; Martić (yellow card) 57'; Moras (yellow card) 71'; López 89'	Stadium: San Siro; Attendance: 27,314; Referee: Gianluca Rocchi

23 November 2014 12	Milan	1–1	Inter	Milan
20:45 CET (UTC+01:00)	Ménez 23'; Mexès (yellow card) 28'; Bonaventura (yellow card) 66'	Report	Obi (yellow card) 32', (goal) 61'; Juan (yellow card) 68'	Stadium: San Siro; Attendance: 79,173; Referee: Marco Guida

30 November 2014 13	Roma	4–2	Inter	Rome
20:45 CET (UTC+01:00)	Gervinho 21'; Keita (yellow card) 44'; Holebas 46'; Pjanić 60', 90+2'	Report	Ranocchia (yellow card) 16', (goal) 36'; M'Vila (yellow card) 49'; Palacio (yellow card) 56'; Osvaldo 57'; Guarín (yellow card) 90'	Stadium: Stadio Olimpico; Attendance: 41,701; Referee: Paolo Mazzoleni

7 December 2014 14	Inter	1–2	Udinese	Milan
20:45 CET (UTC+01:00)	Icardi 44'; Dodô (yellow card) 49'	Report	Fernandes 60'; Théréau 71'; Pinzi (yellow card) 86'	Stadium: San Siro; Attendance: 34,912; Referee: Andrea Gervasoni

15 December 2014 15	Chievo	0–2	Inter	Verona
21:00 CET (UTC+01:00)	Izco (yellow card) 22'; Cesar (yellow card) 38'; Meggiorini (yellow card) 42'; Botta (yellow card) 72' (yellow-red card) 73'	Report	Kovačić 19'; Handanović (yellow card) 45'; Ranocchia 55'	Stadium: Stadio Marc'Antonio Bentegodi; Referee: Davide Massa

21 December 2014 16	Inter	2–2	Lazio	Milan
20:45 CET (UTC+01:00)	D'Ambrosio (yellow card) 50'; Kovačić 66'; Palacio 80'	Report	Anderson 2', 37', (yellow card) 18'; Lulić (yellow card) 30'; Klose (yellow card) 32'; González (yellow card) 87'	Stadium: San Siro; Attendance: 36,344; Referee: Paolo Tagliavento

6 January 2015 17	Juventus	1–1	Inter	Turin
21:00 CET (UTC+01:00)	Tevez 5'; Morata (yellow card) 71'; Bonucci (yellow card) 82'	Report	Icardi 64', (yellow card) 66'; Ranocchia (yellow card) 67'; Juan (yellow card) 80'; Medel (yellow card) 84'; Kovačić (red card) 86'	Stadium: Juventus Stadium; Attendance: 38,791; Referee: Luca Banti

11 January 2015 18	Inter	3–1	Genoa	Milan
12:30 CET (UTC+01:00)	Palacio 12'; Icardi 40'; Campagnaro (yellow card) 85'; Vidić 88'	Report	De Maio (yellow card) 71'; Bertolacci (yellow card) 82'; Izzo 85'	Stadium: San Siro; Attendance: 37,525; Referee: Carmine Russo

17 January 2015 19	Empoli	0–0	Inter	Empoli
18:00 CET (UTC+01:00)	Mchedlidze (yellow card) 57'	Report	Vidić (yellow card) 86'; Medel (yellow card) 90+3'	Stadium: Stadio Carlo Castellani; Attendance: 13,449; Referee: Daniele Doveri

25 January 2015 20	Inter	0–1	Torino	Milan
15:00 CET (UTC+01:00)	D'Ambrosio (yellow card) 52'; Icardi (yellow card) 79'	Report	Gazzi (yellow card) 75'; Darmian (yellow card) 86'; Moretti 90+4'	Stadium: San Siro; Attendance: 34,209; Referee: Massimiliano Irrati

1 February 2015 21	Sassuolo	3–1	Inter	Reggio Emilia
12:30 CET (UTC+01:00)	Missiroli (yellow card) 9'; Zaza (yellow card) 11', (goal) 17'; Sansone 29', (yellow card) 84' (yellow-red card) 90'; Berardi (yellow card) 85', (goal) 90+3' (pen.)	Report	Ranocchia (yellow card) 21'; Vidić (yellow card) 66'; Donkor (yellow card) 78' (yellow-red card) 90+2'; Icardi 83', (yellow card) 83'; Medel (yellow card) 90+1'	Stadium: Mapei Stadium – Città del Tricolore; Attendance: 18,446; Referee: Paolo Valeri

8 February 2015 22	Inter	3–0	Palermo	Milan
20:45 CET (UTC+01:00)	Medel (yellow card) 13'; Guarín 16'; Juan (yellow card) 40'; Icardi 65', 88'	Report	Morganella (yellow card) 20'; Rigoni (yellow card) 72'; González (yellow card) 77'	Stadium: San Siro; Attendance: 30,085; Referee: Marco Guida

15 February 2015 23	Atalanta	1–4	Inter	Bergamo
15:00 CET (UTC+01:00)	Carmona (yellow card) 22'; Moralez 27', (yellow card) 33'; Pinilla (yellow card) 43'; Benalouane (yellow card) 52' (yellow-red card) 53'	Report	Shaqiri 2' (pen.), (yellow card) 33'; Juan (yellow card) 19'; Guarín 37', 63'; Palacio 72'	Stadium: Stadio Atleti Azzurri d'Italia; Attendance: 13,765; Referee: Luca Banti

23 February 2015 24	Cagliari	1–2	Inter	Cagliari
21:00 CET (UTC+01:00)	Čop (yellow card) 39'; Carrizo 74' (o.g.); Avelar (yellow card) 90+1'	Report	Brozović (yellow card) 13'; Kovačić 47'; Icardi 68'; Campagnaro (yellow card) 89'	Stadium: Stadio Sant'Elia; Attendance: 14,000; Referee: Paolo Mazzoleni

1 March 2015 25	Inter	0–1	Fiorentina	Milan
18:00 CET (UTC+01:00)	Vidić (yellow card) 49'; Juan (yellow card) 52'; Brozović (yellow card) 85'	Report	Aquilani (yellow card) 26'; Salah 55'; Diamanti (yellow card) 69'	Stadium: San Siro; Attendance: 39,310; Referee: Davide Massa

8 March 2015 26	Napoli	2–2	Inter	Naples
20:45 CET (UTC+01:00)	Mertens (yellow card) 15'; Henrique (yellow card) 49' (yellow-red card) 86'; Hamšík 51'; Higuaín 63'	Report	Juan (yellow card) 1'; Brozović (yellow card) 37'; Palacio 72'; Icardi 87' (pen.); Guarín (yellow card) 89'	Stadium: Stadio San Paolo; Attendance: 36,646; Referee: Gianluca Rocchi

15 March 2015 27	Inter	1–1	Cesena	Milan
20:45 CET (UTC+01:00)	Ranocchia (yellow card) 45+1'; Palacio 48'	Report	Defrel (yellow card) 26', (goal) 30'	Stadium: San Siro; Attendance: 24,589; Referee: Andrea Gervasoni

22 March 2015 28	Sampdoria	1–0	Inter	Genoa
20:45 CET (UTC+01:00)	Soriano (yellow card) 17'; Romagnoli (yellow card) 20'; Éder 65', (yellow card) 86'	Report	Shaqiri (yellow card) 22'; Vidić (yellow card) 31'; Juan (yellow card) 44'; D'Ambrosio (yellow card) 64'; Icardi (yellow card) 68'; Medel (yellow card) 69'	Stadium: Stadio Luigi Ferraris; Attendance: 22,865; Referee: Paolo Valeri

4 April 2015 29	Inter	1–1	Parma	Milan
15:00 CEST (UTC+02:00)	Guarín 25'; Ranocchia (yellow card) 61'; Felipe (yellow card) 73'	Report	Lila 44'	Stadium: San Siro; Attendance: 33,175; Referee: Sebastiano Peruzzo

11 April 2015 30	Hellas Verona	0–3	Inter	Verona
20:45 CEST (UTC+02:00)	Moras (yellow card) 36'; Obbadi (yellow card) 56'	Report	Icardi 11'; Juan (yellow card) 18'; Brozović (yellow card) 38'; Guarín (yellow card) 40'; Palacio 48'; Vidić (yellow card) 76'; Moras 90+2' (o.g.)	Stadium: Stadio Marc'Antonio Bentegodi; Attendance: 20,645; Referee: Paolo Tagliavento

19 April 2015 31	Inter	0–0	Milan	Milan
20:45 CEST (UTC+02:00)	Medel (yellow card) 28'; Juan (yellow card) 35'; D'Ambrosio (yellow card) 83'; Hernanes (yellow card) 84'	Report	De Jong (yellow card) 33'; Abate (yellow card) 82'	Stadium: San Siro; Attendance: 74,022; Referee: Luca Banti

25 April 2015 32	Inter	2–1	Roma	Milan
20:45 CEST (UTC+02:00)	Hernanes 15'; Palacio (yellow card) 20'; Brozović (yellow card) 54'; Juan (yellow card) 67'; Ranocchia (yellow card) 74'; Gnoukouri (yellow card) 77'; Icardi 88'; Handanović (yellow card) 90+4'	Report	Yanga-Mbiwa (yellow card) 21'; Nainggolan 63', (yellow card) 90+4'; De Rossi (yellow card) 86'; De Sanctis (yellow card) 90+1'	Stadium: San Siro; Attendance: 37,695; Referee: Daniele Orsato

28 April 2015 33	Udinese	1–2	Inter	Udine
20:45 CEST (UTC+02:00)	Pinzi (yellow card) 14'; Domizzi (yellow card) 26' (yellow-red card) 40'; Karnezis (yellow card) 46'; Di Natale 50'; Widmer (yellow card) 51'; Badu (red card) 58'	Report	Guarín (yellow card) 19'; Icardi 48' (pen.); Podolski 65'; Palacio (yellow card) 83'; Medel (yellow card) 90+3'	Stadium: Stadio Friuli; Referee: Gianluca Rocchi

3 May 2015 34	Inter	0–0	Chievo	Milan
15:00 CEST (UTC+02:00)	Medel (yellow card) 36'; Podolski (yellow card) 63'; Shaqiri (yellow card) 86'	Report	Biraghi (yellow card) 25'	Stadium: San Siro; Attendance: 33,144; Referee: Marco Guida

10 May 2015 35	Lazio	1–2	Inter	Rome
20:45 CEST (UTC+02:00)	Candreva 8'; Maurício (red card) 24'; Mauri (yellow card) 24'; Marchetti (yellow card) 27' (yellow-red card) 61'; Biglia (yellow card) 71'	Report	D'Ambrosio (yellow card) 12'; Hernanes 26', 84', (yellow card) 67'; Nagatomo (yellow card) 90+2'	Stadium: Stadio Olimpico; Attendance: Davide Massa; Referee: 37,367

16 May 2015 36	Inter	1–2	Juventus	Milan
18:00 CEST (UTC+02:00)	Icardi 9'; Ranocchia (yellow card) 33'; Brozović (yellow card) 35'; Vidić (yellow card) 41'; Kovačić (yellow card) 58'; Juan (yellow card) 67'	Report	Marchisio 42' (pen.); Morata (yellow card) 52', (goal) 83'; Lichtsteiner (yellow card) 54'	Stadium: San Siro; Attendance: 60,362; Referee: Daniele Doveri

23 May 2015 37	Genoa	3–2	Inter	Genoa
20:45 CEST (UTC+02:00)	Pavoletti 24'; Lestienne 41'; Kucka (yellow card) 44', (goal) 89'; De Maio (yellow card) 63'; Roncaglia (yellow card) 90+1'	Report	Icardi 19'; Palacio 30'; Hernanes (yellow card) 39'; Brozović (yellow card) 44'; D'Ambrosio (yellow card) 64'; Juan (yellow card) 88'	Stadium: Stadio Luigi Ferraris; Attendance: 27,161; Referee: Paolo Tagliavento

31 May 2015 38	Inter	4–3	Empoli	Milan
20:45 CEST (UTC+02:00)	Palacio 49'; Icardi 53', 77'; Brozović 70'; Hernanes (yellow card) 84'	Report	Mchedlidze 59', 88'; Pucciarelli 62'; Barba (yellow card) 63'; Valdifiori (yellow card) 67'; Mário Rui (yellow card) 90+3'	Stadium: San Siro; Attendance: 32,036; Referee: Antonio Damato

=== Coppa Italia ===
21 January 2015 Round of 16	Inter	2–0	Sampdoria	Milan
21:00 CET (UTC+01:00)	Andreolli (yellow card) 23'; Podolski (yellow card) 42'; Shaqiri (yellow card) 63', (goal) 71'; Icardi 88'	Report	Krstičić (red card) 11'; Wszołek (yellow card) 36' (yellow-red card) 77'; Romagnoli (yellow card) 60'; Gastaldello (yellow card) 78'	Stadium: San Siro; Attendance: 38,497; Referee: Paolo Tagliavento

4 February 2015 Quarter-finals	Napoli	1–0	Inter	Naples
20:45 CET (UTC+01:00)	Gargano (yellow card) 56'; Higuaín 90+3'	Report	Shaqiri (yellow card) 22'; Juan (yellow card) 39'; Medel (yellow card) 56'; Pușcaș (yellow card) 64'; Ranocchia (yellow card) 90+1'	Stadium: Stadio San Paolo; Attendance: 45,000; Referee: Davide Massa

=== UEFA Europa League ===
==== Play-off round ====
20 August 2014 First leg	Stjarnan (Iceland)	0–3	(Italy) Inter	Garðabær, Iceland
21:00 CEST (UTC+02:00)		Report	Icardi 41'; Dodô 48'; Vidić (yellow card) 65'; D'Ambrosio 89'	Stadium: Stjörnuvöllur; Attendance: 9,829; Referee: Marijo Strahonja (Croatia)

28 August 2014 Second leg	Inter (Italy)	6–0 (9–0 agg.)	(Iceland) Stjarnan	Milan, Italy
20:45 CEST (UTC+02:00)	Kovačić 28', 33', 51'; Osvaldo 47'; Icardi 69', 80'; Nagatomo (yellow card) 90'	Report	Rauschenberg (yellow card) 49'	Stadium: San Siro; Attendance: 46,440; Referee: Harald Lechner (Austria)

==== Group stage ====
Pos	Team	Pld	W	D	L	GF	GA	GD	Pts	Qualification	INT	DNI	QAR	SET
1	(Italy) Internazionale	6	3	3	0	6	2	+4	12	Advance to knockout phase	—	2–1	2–0	0–0
2	(Ukraine) Dnipro Dnipropetrovsk	6	2	1	3	4	5	−1	7	Advance to knockout phase	0–1	—	0–1	1–0
3	(Azerbaijan) Qarabağ	6	1	3	2	3	5	−2	6		0–0	1–2	—	0–0
4	(France) Saint-Étienne	6	0	5	1	2	3	−1	5		1–1	0–0	1–1	—

Source: Soccerway
Rules for classification: Group stage tiebreakers

18 September 2014 1	Dnipro Dnipropetrovsk (Ukraine)	0–1	(Italy) Inter	Kyiv, Ukraine
19:00 CEST (UTC+02:00)	Zozulya (yellow card) 24'; Strinić (yellow card) 52'; Rotan (yellow card) 60' (yellow-red card) 69'	Report	Kuzmanović (yellow card) 27'; D'Ambrosio 71'	Stadium: Olympic Stadium; Attendance: 25,200; Referee: Felix Zwayer (Germany)

2 October 2014 2	Inter (Italy)	2–0	(Azerbaijan) Qarabağ	Milan, Italy
21:05 CEST (UTC+02:00)	D'Ambrosio 18'; Juan (yellow card) 80'; Medel (yellow card) 83'; Icardi 86'	Report	Muarem (yellow card) 90+4'	Stadium: San Siro; Attendance: 28,435; Referee: Aleksei Kulbakov (Belarus)

23 October 2014 3	Inter (Italy)	0–0	(France) Saint-Étienne	Milan, Italy
21:05 CEST (UTC+02:00)	Juan (yellow card) 80'; Hernanes (yellow card) 89'	Report	Bayal Sall (yellow card) 42'	Stadium: San Siro; Attendance: 33,379; Referee: Anthony Taylor (England)

6 November 2014 4	Saint-Étienne (France)	1–1	(Italy) Inter	Saint-Étienne, France
19:00 CET (UTC+01:00)	Bayal Sall 50'; Tabanou (yellow card) 53'	Report	Dodô 33'	Stadium: Stade Geoffroy-Guichard; Attendance: 36,411; Referee: Slavko Vinčić (Slovenia)

27 November 2014 5	Inter (Italy)	2–1	(Ukraine) Dnipro Dnipropetrovsk	Milan, Italy
21:05 CET (UTC+01:00)	Ranocchia (yellow card) 22' (yellow-red card) 46'; Kuzmanović 30'; Hernanes (yellow card) 31'; Osvaldo 50'; Guarín (yellow card) 66'	Report	Rotan 16'	Stadium: San Siro; Attendance: 14,415; Referee: Bobby Madden (Scotland)

11 December 2014 6	Qarabağ (Azerbaijan)	0–0	(Italy) Inter	Baku, Azerbaijan
18:00 CET (UTC+01:00)	Alaskarov (yellow card) 18'	Report		Stadium: Tofiq Bahramov Republican Stadium; Attendance: 31,200; Referee: Miroslav Zelinka (Czech Republic)

==== Knockout phase ====
===== Round of 32 =====
19 February 2015 First leg	Celtic (Scotland)	3–3	(Italy) Inter	Glasgow, Scotland
21:05 CET (UTC+01:00)	Armstrong 24'; Campagnaro 26' (o.g.); Van Dijk (yellow card) 71'; Johansen (yellow card) 88'; Henderson (yellow card) 90'; Guidetti 90+3'	Report	Shaqiri 4', (yellow card) 37'; Palacio 13', 45'; Santon (yellow card) 67'; Campagnaro (yellow card) 81'	Stadium: Celtic Park; Attendance: 58,500; Referee: István Vad (Hungary)

26 February 2015 Second leg	Inter (Italy)	1–0 (4–3 agg.)	(Scotland) Celtic	Milan, Italy
19:00 CET (UTC+01:00)	D'Ambrosio (yellow card) 43'; Guarín (yellow card) 78', (goal) 88'	Report	Van Dijk (yellow card) 27' (yellow-red card) 37'; Izaguirre (yellow card) 54'; Gordon (yellow card) 71'; Bitton (yellow card) 85'; Matthews (yellow card) 86'; Commons (yellow card) 90+4'	Stadium: San Siro; Attendance: 39,711; Referee: Ivan Kružliak (Slovakia)

===== Round of 16 =====
12 March 2015 First leg	VfL Wolfsburg (Germany)	3–1	(Italy) Inter	Wolfsburg, Germany
19:00 CET (UTC+01:00)	Naldo 28', (yellow card) 71'; De Bruyne 63', 76'	Report	Palacio 6'; Icardi (yellow card) 30'; D'Ambrosio (yellow card) 35'; Vidić (yellow card) 75'; Ranocchia (yellow card) 83'	Stadium: Volkswagen Arena; Attendance: 25,374; Referee: Szymon Marciniak (Poland)

19 March 2015 Second leg	Inter (Italy)	1–2 (2–5 agg.)	(Germany) VfL Wolfsburg	Milan, Italy
21:05 CET (UTC+01:00)	Palacio 71'; Medel (yellow card) 87'	Report	Caligiuri 24'; De Bruyne (yellow card) 84'; Arnold (yellow card) 87'; Bendtner 89'	Stadium: San Siro; Attendance: 38,800; Referee: Mark Clattenburg (England)

== Statistics ==
	Total	Home	Away	Neutral
Games played	52	26	26	
Games won	21	12	9	
Games drawn	17	7	10	
Games lost	14	6	8	
Biggest win	7–0 vs Sassuolo	7–0 vs Sassuolo	3–0 vs Stjarnan	
Biggest loss	1–4 vs Cagliari; 0–3 vs Fiorentina	1–4 vs Cagliari	0–3 vs Fiorentina	
Biggest win (League)	7–0 vs Sassuolo	7–0 vs Sassuolo		
Biggest win (Cup)	—	-	-	
Biggest win (Europe)	6–0 vs Stjarnan	6–0 vs Stjarnan	3–0 vs Stjarnan	
Biggest loss (League)	-	-	-	
Biggest loss (Cup)	-	-	-	
Biggest loss (Europe)	-	-	-	
Clean sheets	6	3	3	
Goals scored	20	15	5	
Goals conceded	1	0	1	
Goal difference	+19	+15	+4	
Average GF per game	4	6.5	3	
Average GA per game	0	0	0	
Yellow cards	1	1	1	
Red cards	0	0	0	
Most appearances				
Top scorer				
Worst discipline				
Penalties for				
Penalties against				
League points				
Winning rate				

=== Appearances and goals ===
No.	Pos	Nat	Player	Total		Serie A		Coppa Italia		Europa League	
No.	Pos	Nat	Player	Apps	Goals	Apps	Goals	Apps	Goals	Apps	Goals
Goalkeepers
1	GK	(Slovenia) SLO	Samir Handanović	40	0	37	0	0	0	3	0
18	GK	(Argentina) ARG	Juan Pablo Carrizo	12	0	1	0	2	0	9	0
46	GK	(Italy) ITA	Tommaso Berni	0	0	0	0	0	0	0	0
Defenders
2	DF	(Brazil) BRA	Jonathan	5	0	2	0	0	0	1+2	0
5	DF	(Brazil) BRA	Juan Jesus	45	0	32	0	2	0	11	0
6	DF	(Italy) ITA	Marco Andreolli	13	0	5+1	0	1	0	5+1	0
14	DF	(Argentina) ARG	Hugo Campagnaro	16	0	8+2	0	0	0	4+2	0
15	DF	(Serbia) SRB	Nemanja Vidić	28	1	23	1	0	0	4+1	0
21	DF	(Italy) ITA	Davide Santon	14	0	7+2	0	1	0	4	0
22	DF	(Brazil) BRA	Dodô	28	2	16+4	0	1+1	0	5+1	2
23	DF	(Italy) ITA	Andrea Ranocchia	42	2	32+1	2	1	0	8	0
26	DF	(Brazil) BRA	Felipe	4	0	3+1	0	0	0	0	0
33	DF	(Italy) ITA	Danilo D'Ambrosio	32	3	19+4	0	1	0	6+2	3
54	DF	(Ghana) GHA	Isaac Donkor	3	0	1+1	0	0	0	1	0
55	DF	(Japan) JPN	Yuto Nagatomo	18	0	11+3	0	1	0	3	0
93	DF	(Italy) ITA	Federico Dimarco	1	0	0+1	0	0	0	0	0
Midfielders
10	MF	(Croatia) CRO	Mateo Kovačić	44	8	26+9	5	1	0	5+3	3
13	MF	(Colombia) COL	Fredy Guarín	37	7	25+3	6	0+1	0	8	1
17	MF	(Serbia) SRB	Zdravko Kuzmanović	25	1	10+4	0	1	0	6+4	1
18	MF	(Chile) CHI	Gary Medel	44	0	34+1	0	2	0	6+1	0
20	MF	(Nigeria) NGR	Joel Obi	17	1	6+5	1	0+1	0	2+3	0
27	MF	(Ivory Coast) CIV	Assane Demoya Gnoukouri	5	0	2+3	0	0	0	0	0
29	MF	(Guinea) GUI	Gaston Camara	3	0	0+2	0	1	0	0	0
77	MF	(Croatia) CRO	Marcelo Brozović	16	1	13+2	1	1	0	0	0
88	MF	(Brazil) BRA	Hernanes	35	5	17+9	5	0	0	8+1	0
Forwards
8	FW	(Argentina) ARG	Rodrigo Palacio	41	12	30+5	8	0	0	5+1	4
9	FW	(Argentina) ARG	Mauro Icardi	48	27	33+3	22	2	1	9+1	4
11	FW	(Germany) GER	Lukas Podolski	18	1	8+9	1	1	0	0	0
28	FW	(Romania) ROU	George Pușcaș	7	0	1+3	0	1+1	0	0+1	0
91	FW	(Switzerland) SUI	Xherdan Shaqiri	20	3	8+7	1	2	1	3	1
97	FW	(Italy) ITA	Federico Bonazzoli	7	0	0+4	0	0+1	0	2	0
Players transferred out during the season
7	FW	(Italy) ITA	Dani Osvaldo	19	7	5+7	5	0	0	3+4	2
19	MF	(Argentina) ARG	Rubén Botta	2	0	0	0	0+1	0	1	0
44	MF	(Slovenia) SLO	Rene Krhin	5	0	0+3	0	0	0	1+1	0
90	MF	(France) FRA	Yann M'Vila	14	0	3+5	0	0	0	6	0

Last updated: 31 May 2015
Source: Competitions

=== Goalscorers ===
No.	Pos.	Nation	Name	Serie A	Coppa Italia	Europa League	Total
9	FW	(Argentina)	Mauro Icardi	22	1	4	27
8	FW	(Argentina)	Rodrigo Palacio	8	0	4	12
10	MF	(Croatia)	Mateo Kovačić	5	0	3	8
7	FW	(Italy)	Dani Osvaldo	5	0	2	7
13	MF	(Colombia)	Fredy Guarín	6	0	1	7
88	MF	(Brazil)	Hernanes	5	0	0	5
33	DF	(Italy)	Danilo D'Ambrosio	0	0	3	3
91	MF	(Switzerland)	Xherdan Shaqiri	1	1	1	3
22	DF	(Brazil)	Dodô	0	0	2	2
23	DF	(Italy)	Andrea Ranocchia	2	0	0	2
11	FW	(Germany)	Lukas Podolski	1	0	0	1
15	DF	(Serbia)	Nemanja Vidić	1	0	0	1
17	MF	(Serbia)	Zdravko Kuzmanović	0	0	1	1
20	MF	(Nigeria)	Joel Obi	1	0	0	1
77	MF	(Croatia)	Marcelo Brozović	1	0	0	1
#	Own goals			1	0	0	1
TOTAL				59	2	21	82

Last updated: 31 May 2015
Source: Calcio.com
