= Lorenzo Tassi =

Italian footballer

Personal information
- Date of birth: 12 February 1995 (age 31)
- Place of birth: Bovezzo, Italy
- Height: 1.77 m (5 ft 10 in)
- Position: Midfielder

Youth career
- Brescia
- 2011–2014: Internazionale

Senior career*
Years	Team	Apps	(Gls)
2010–2011	Brescia	1	(0)
2014–2020	Inter Milan	0	(0)
2014–2015	→ Prato (loan)	21	(0)
2015–2016	→ Savona (loan)	11	(0)
2016–2017	→ Avellino (loan)	0	(0)
2017	→ FeralpiSalò (loan)	13	(1)
2017–2018	→ Vicenza (loan)	23	(0)
2018–2020	→ Arezzo (loan)	33	(2)
2021	Vis Pesaro	6	(0)

International career
2010	Italy U16	2	(0)
2010–2011	Italy U17	12	(1)
2011	Italy U18	1	(1)
- * Club domestic league appearances and goals as of 2 May 2021

Lorenzo Tassi (born 12 February 1995) is an Italian footballer who plays as a midfielder. He has been used as an attacking midfielder, as a second striker and as a deep-lying playmaker so far during his youth career.

== Club career ==
Tassi made his Serie A debut at the age of 16 years and 99 days, making him the ninth-youngest player ever to debut in Serie A; he came on as a substitute for Brescia in a 2–2 draw at home against Fiorentina on 22 May 2011, and played the last 15 minutes of the match.

Already dubbed the "new Roberto Baggio" by the club's president at the time, Luigi Corioni, due to his playing role, style, and promising performances for Brescia at youth level, on the last day of the transfer market in the summer of 2011, Internazionale signed him on a co-ownership deal with Brescia for €2 million, meaning he would play for Inter's youth team during the 2011–12 season. Due to his young age, he played in Allievi Nazionali U-17 team in his first year with the club. He won the Torneo Città di Arco with the team.

On 20 June 2014 Inter bought the remaining 50% registration rights of Tassi from Brescia for another €250,000. On 24 July 2014 he was farmed to Lega Pro side Prato for the 2014–15 season.

In August 2015, he was sent on loan from Inter to Lega Pro side Savona for the 2015–16 season, along with his young Inter team-mate Demetrio Steffè.

In July 2016, Tassi was sent on loan from Inter to Serie B side Avellino. On 31 January 2017, Tassi returned to Inter, after spending the first half of the 2016–17 season on loan with Avellino; he was subsequently loaned out once again for the second half of the season to Lega Pro side FeralpiSalò.

On 14 January 2021, he signed a contract until 30 June 2021 with Serie C club Vis Pesaro.

== Style of play ==
A talented midfielder, Tassi is a quick player with a good feet and slender build, who is good on the ball, and dangerous in attacking areas due to his ability provide assists for teammates or score decisive goals. Although he initially usually played as an attacking midfielder, he is a tactically versatile playmaker, who has also been used as a second striker, or even as central or defensive midfielder in recent seasons, in a deep-lying playmaking role. Widely regarded as one of the most exciting prospects in Italian football of his generation in his youth, his characteristics and playing role drew comparisons with Roberto Baggio, and also Andrea Pirlo.
