= Assane Gnoukouri =

Ivorian professional footballer (born 1996)

Assane Demoya Gnoukouri
Personal information
- Full name: Assane Demoya Gnoukouri
- Date of birth: 28 September 1996 (age 30)
- Place of birth: Abidjan, Ivory Coast
- Height: 1.80 m (5 ft 11 in)
- Position: Midfielder

Youth career
- 2013–2014: Altovicentino
- 2014–2015: Internazionale

Senior career*
Years	Team	Apps	(Gls)
2014–2017	Internazionale	11	(0)
2017	→ Udinese (loan)	0	(0)

International career
2016	Ivory Coast U23	1	(0)
- * Club domestic league appearances and goals as of 16 October 2016

Assane Demoya Gnoukouri (pronounced [asan dəmwaja ɲukuʁi]; born 28 September 1996) is an Ivorian professional footballer who plays as a midfielder. He temporarily retired in 2017 following a diagnosis with a heart condition while playing for Serie A club Udinese, on loan from Inter Milan. Gnoukouri made his Serie A debut as an 18-year-old for Inter, under then coach, Roberto Mancini.

== Early career ==
Gnoukouri spent his early career at the Altovicentino. On 18 September 2014, Gnoukouri, along with his younger brother Zate Wilfried Gnoukouri and other brothers, Miguel Anguel Gnoukouri and Williams Gnoukouri, joined the Internazionale Primavera.

== Club career ==
He made his Serie A debut for the club on 11 April 2015, coming on as a substitute for Gary Medel after 80 minutes in 3–0 win against Hellas Verona.

== International career ==
Gnoukouri was born in Ivory Coast to Ivorian parents, but was raised in France as child before spending his late teens in Italy. He received a call up to the Ivory Coast national football team for their friendly tie against Hungary, where he was an unused substitute in a 0–0 draw. He debuted for the Ivory Coast U23s in a 5–1 loss to France U21 in November 2016.

== Statistics ==
=== Club ===
As of 24 November 2016

Club	Season	League		Cup		Europe		Other		Total	
Club	Season	Apps	Goals	Apps	Goals	Apps	Goals	Apps	Goals	Apps	Goals
Internazionale
Internazionale	2014–15	5	0	0	0	0	0	–		5	0
Internazionale	2015–16	2	0	1	0	0	0	–		3	0
Internazionale	2016–17	4	0	0	0	4	0	–		8	0
Internazionale	Total	11	0	1	0	4	0	–		16	0
Career total		11	0	1	0	4	0	–		16	0
