= Andrea Pinton =

Italian footballer (born 1996)

Personal information
- Full name: Andrea Pinton
- Date of birth: 28 April 1996 (age 30)
- Place of birth: Italy
- Height: 1.86 m (6 ft 1 in)
- Position: Centre-back

Team information
- Current team: Offanenghese

Youth career
- Vicenza
- 2012–2015: Inter Milan
- 2015: → Torino (loan)

Senior career*
Years	Team	Apps	(Gls)
2015–2017	Inter Milan	0	(0)
2015–2016	→ Savona (loan)	2	(0)
2016	→ Vicenza (loan)	0	(0)
2017–2018	Ciserano	9	(1)
2018–2020	Virtus Bolzano	42	(2)
2020–2021	Lumezzane		
2021–2022	Sant'Angelo		
2022–	Offanenghese		
- * Club domestic league appearances and goals as of 21 February 2018

Andrea Pinton (born 28 April 1996) is an Italian professional footballer who plays as a centre-back for US Offanenghese 1933.

Pinton was signed by F.C. Internazionale Milano on 28 August 2012 in a 5-year contract for €220,000 fee (also costing Inter an additional €35,000).

In July 2015, Pinton was signed by Savona F.B.C.

On 1 February 2016, Pinton returned to Vicenza in a temporary deal.

On 24 November 2017, Pinton signed for Ciserano.
