= Matteo Lomolino =

Italian footballer

Personal information
- Full name: Matteo Vito Lomolino
- Date of birth: 11 March 1996 (age 30)
- Place of birth: Milan, Italy
- Height: 1.83 m (6 ft 0 in)
- Position: Defender

Team information
- Current team: Castrumfavara

Youth career
- –2015: Inter Milan
- 2013–2014: → Modena

Senior career*
Years	Team	Apps	(Gls)
2015–2016	Inter Milan	0	(0)
2015–2016	→ Savona (loan)	9	(0)
2016–2017	Südtirol	4	(0)
2017	Cuneo	0	(0)
2018–2019	Robur Siena	0	(0)
2018–2019	→ Trapani (loan)	10	(0)
2019–2021	Carpi	46	(0)
2021	Tritium	1	(0)
2021–2022	Ponte San Pietro	13	(1)
2022–2023	Castanese	31	(0)
2023–2024	Legnano	21	(0)
2024–2025	San Marino	11	(0)
2025	Fiorenzuola	14	(0)
2025–2026	Igea Virtus	10	(0)
2026–	Castrumfavara	0	(0)

International career
2012	Italy U-17	4	(0)
- * Club domestic league appearances and goals as of 18 January 2026

Matteo Vito Lomolino (born 11 March 1996) is an Italian football player who plays as a defender for Serie D club Castrumfavara.

== Club career ==
He made his professional debut in the Lega Pro for Savona on 30 September 2015 in a game against Pontedera.

On 31 July 2019, he signed a two-year contract with Carpi.

== International ==
He represented Italy national under-17 football team at the 2013 UEFA European Under-17 Championship, where Italy was the runner-up, and at the 2013 FIFA U-17 World Cup.
