= Dylan Alexis Romney =

French footballer (born 1996)

Personal information
- Date of birth: 17 February 1996 (age 30)
- Place of birth: Gonesse, France

Youth career
- –2015: Inter
- 2013–2014: → Varese (loan)

Senior career*
Years	Team	Apps	(Gls)
2015–2016	Inter	0	(0)
2015–2016	→ Savona (loan)	5	(0)
2016–2017	Paris FC B	4	(3)
2019	JA Drancy	3	(0)
- * Club domestic league appearances and goals

Dylan Alexis Romney (born 17 February 1996) is a French professional footballer who plays as a forward.

== Club career ==
Romney started his career with Italian Serie A side Inter. In 2015, Romney was sent on loan to Savona in the Italian third tier, where he made five league appearances. On 14 October 2015, he debuted for Savona in a 2–1 loss to Maceratese. In 2016, Romney signed for French fifth tier club Paris FC B.

== International career ==
He is eligible to represent the United States.
