= Riccardo Gaiola =

Italian footballer (born 1996)

Personal information
- Date of birth: 1 April 1996 (age 30)
- Place of birth: Padua, Italy
- Height: 1.83 m (6 ft 0 in)
- Position: Midfielder

Team information
- Current team: Forlì
- Number: 5

Youth career
- –2015: Inter
- 2014–2015: → Cesena (loan)

Senior career*
Years	Team	Apps	(Gls)
2015–2018	Inter	0	(0)
2015–2016	→ Prato (loan)	28	(0)
2016–2017	→ Padova (loan)	3	(0)
2017–2018	→ Santarcangelo (loan)	11	(0)
2018	Santarcangelo	0	(0)
2019	Vis Pesaro	11	(0)
2019–2020	Cattolica San Marino	25	(0)
2020–2021	Cattolica	29	(2)
2021–2023	Sammaurese	66	(4)
2023–	Forlì	54	(5)

International career
2011	Italy U-16	2	(0)
- * Club domestic league appearances and goals as of 23 August 2026

Riccardo Gaiola (born 1 April 1996) is an Italian professional footballer who plays as a midfielder for Serie C Group B club Forlì.

== Biography ==
Born in Padua, Veneto, Gaiola was a youth product of Lombard club Internazionale. He was a member of their under-15 football team during the 2010–11 season. Gaiola left the reserve team in summer 2014, for Cesena. On 11 August 2015, he was signed by Lega Pro club Prato. The club also signed several players from Inter, such as fellow midfielder Gianmarco Gabbianelli on the same day.

On 2 August 2019, Gaiola joined Serie D club Cattolica San Marino.
