= Morten Knudsen =

Danish footballer (born 1995)

Personal information
- Full name: Morten Brander Knudsen
- Date of birth: 28 April 1995 (age 31)
- Place of birth: Denmark
- Height: 1.78 m (5 ft 10 in)
- Position: Midfielder

Team information
- Current team: Hvidovre
- Number: 18

Youth career
- HIK
- Midtjylland
- 2013–2014: Inter Milan

Senior career*
Years	Team	Apps	(Gls)
2014–2017	Inter Milan	0	(0)
2014–2016	→ Prato (loan)	35	(1)
2016–2017	→ Reggina (loan)	29	(0)
2017–2018	Sarpsborg 08 II	6	(0)
2018–2021	Vendsyssel	78	(1)
2021–2024	Phönix Lübeck	86	(8)
2024–	Hvidovre	29	(1)

International career
2010	Denmark U16	5	(0)
2011	Denmark U17	10	(1)
2012	Denmark U18	1	(0)
2013	Denmark U19	4	(0)
- * Club domestic league appearances and goals as of 2 June 2026

Morten Brander Knudsen (born 28 April 1995) is a Danish footballer who plays as a central midfielder for Danish 1st Division club Hvidovre IF.

== Career ==
Knudsen was signed by Italian club Inter Milan in January 2013, from Danish club Midtjylland, as a youth. He spent a year and a half in Inter's reserve team.

On 21 August 2014 Knudsen was farmed to affiliated club Prato in a temporary deal. The club signed several players from Inter as part of the partnership agreement. On 13 August 2015 the loan deal was renewed.

On 15 September 2017, Knudsen signed an amateur contract with Norwegian club Sarpsborg 08. The club couldn not offer him a professional contract because they had to many foreign players in the squad, so Knudsen was incorporated in the reserve squad.

On 23 January 2018, it was announced that Knudsen had signed with Vendsyssel FF. In June 2021, his contract with the club expired amidst uncertain circumstances at the club, where the foreign owners had left shortly after survival in the Danish 1st Division became a fact.

On 5 August 2021, Knudsen joined German club 1. FC Phönix Lübeck. After three seasons in Germany, it was confirmed on 26 August 2024 that Knudsen had signed with the recently relegated Danish 1st Division club Hvidovre IF. The club did not announce the length of the contract. He left the club when his contract expired in June 2026, but in September he returned to Hvidovre IF on a short-term contract.

=== International career ===
Knudsen made his competitive debut for Denmark youth team on 12 October 2011, a 4–1 win against Italy U17. Denmark qualified from 2012 UEFA European Under-17 Championship qualifying round. However, Knudsen was dropped from the squad for the elite round. Knudsen was re-selected to 2014 UEFA European Under-19 Championship qualifying round. Knudsen was a substitute of Mikkel Wohlgemuth and Johannes Ritter, respectively.
