= Leonardo Longo =

Italian footballer (born 1995)

Personal information
- Date of birth: 15 May 1995 (age 31)
- Place of birth: Fiesole, Italy
- Height: 1.86 m (6 ft 1 in)
- Position: Centre back

Youth career
- –2012: Prato

Senior career*
Years	Team	Apps	(Gls)
2012–2013	Prato	1	(0)
2012–2013	→ Inter Milan (loan)	0	(0)
2013–2016	Inter Milan	0	(0)
2014–2015	→ Grosseto (loan)	3	(0)
2015–2016	→ Mantova (loan)	11	(0)
2016–2017	Catanzaro	0	(0)
2016–2017	→ Paganese (loan)	17	(1)
2017–2018	Monopoli	22	(4)
2018–2019	Bisceglie	31	(2)
2019–2020	Casertana	28	(1)
2020–2021	Cesena	22	(0)
2021–2022	Forlì	3	(1)

International career
2012	Italy U18	1	(0)
- * Club domestic league appearances and goals as of 2 May 2021

Leonardo Longo (born 15 May 1995) is an Italian footballer who plays as a centre back for Forli FC

== Club career ==
He made his professional debut for Prato on 25 April 2012 against Siracusa.

On 13 July 2019, he signed with Casertana. On 24 September 2020, his Casertana contract was terminated by mutual consent.

On 3 October 2020 he joined Cesena.

On 9 February 2022 he join Forli FC, his contract is due to expire 30 June 2022.
