= Gaston Camara =

Guinean footballer (born 1996)

Personal information
- Full name: Gaston Camara
- Date of birth: 31 May 1996 (age 30)
- Place of birth: Port Kamsar, Guinea
- Height: 1.77 m (5 ft 10 in)
- Position: Winger

Team information
- Current team: Paternò

Youth career
- 2013–2014: Santarcangelo
- 2013–2014: → Inter Milan (loan)
- 2014–2015: Inter Milan

Senior career*
Years	Team	Apps	(Gls)
2014–2018	Internazionale	2	(0)
2015–2016	→ Bari (loan)	0	(0)
2016	→ Modena (loan)	10	(0)
2016–2017	→ Brescia (loan)	28	(0)
2017–2018	→ Gil Vicente (loan)	31	(1)
2019	Leixões	9	(1)
2019–2020	Sammaurese Calcio	11	(1)
2020–	Pedras Rubras		
2021–2022	Paternò Calcio		
- * Club domestic league appearances and goals as of 22:33, 8 February 2020 (UTC)

Gaston Camara (born 31 March 1996) is a Guinean professional footballer who currently plays as a winger for Siracusa Calcio, Sicilian team of Italian championship of Eccellenza.

== Club career ==
=== Internazionale ===
Camara played on loan for Internazionale from August 2013 till January 2014. In January 2014 he moved permanently to Inter. He made his Serie A debut at 1 November 2014 against Parma. He replaced Gary Medel after 89 minutes in a 2–0 away defeat. He is highly rated by Inter fans as a quick, and technically capable, right winger.

==== Loan to Bari and Modena ====
On 4 August 2015, Camara was signed on loan by Bari. However, he return to Inter in January 2016 without play any match with Bari.

On 28 January 2016, Camara was signed by Serie B side Modena on a 6-month loan deal. On 30 January he made his debut for Modena in Serie B as a substitute replacing Luca Belingheri in the 82nd minute in a 2–1 home defeat against Ternana. On 13 February he played his first and only entire match for the team, a 2–1 defeat against Virtus Lanciano. Camara ended his 6-month loan to Modena with 10 appearances, but only 1 as a stater.

==== Loan to Brescia ====
On 4 August 2016, Camara was signed by Serie B club Brescia on a season-long loan with option to buy. Three days later, on 7 August, he made his debut for the club the second round of the Coppa Italia replacing Andrej Modic in the 65th minute of a 2–0 loss against Pisa. On 27 August he made his Serie B debut for Brescia as a substitute replacining Federico Bonazzoli in the 82nd minute in a 1–1 away draw against Avellino. On 26 November he played his first match as a starter, a 1–0 home win over Ascoli, he was replaced by Federico Bonazzoli after 71 minutes. On 24 February 2017, Camara played his first entire match for the team, a 4–1 home win over Cittadella. On 21 June Brescia excised the option to buy the player. However, Internazionale also excised the counter-option on the next day.

==== Loan to Gil Vicente ====
On 2 August 2017, Camara was signed by LigaPro club Gil Vicente on a season-long loan. On 13 August he made he made his debut in for the club as a substitute replacing James Igbekeme in the 76th minute in a 2–1 home defeat against Cova de Piedade. On 30 September he played his first entire match for Gil Vicente, a 3–0 home win over Vitória Guimarães II. On 18 March 2018, Camara scored his first professional goal in the 26th minute of a 2–1 away win over Benfica II. Camara ended his season-long loan to Gil Vicente with 31 appearances, 1 goal and 4 assists.

=== Leixões ===
On 31 January 2019, Camara signed with Leixões for the rest of the season.

=== Sammaurese Calcio ===
In August 2019, Camara returned to Italy and joined Serie D club Sammaurese Calcio.

== Career statistics ==
=== Club ===
As of 14 January 2019

Club	Season	League			Cup		Europe		Other		Total	
Club	Season	Division	Apps	Goals	Apps	Goals	Apps	Goals	Apps	Goals	Apps	Goals
Internazionale	2014–15	Serie A	2	0	0	0	0	0	–		2	0
Internazionale	Total		2	0	0	0	0	0	–		2	0
Bari (loan)	2015–16	Serie B	0	0	0	0	–		–		0	0
Modena (loan)	2015–16	Serie B	10	0	0	0	–		–		10	0
Brescia (loan)	2016–17	Serie B	28	0	1	0	–		–		29	0
Gil Vincente (loan)	2017–18	LigaPro	31	1	0	0	–		–		31	1
Paternò Calcio (loan)	2021-22	Serie D	0	0	1	2	–		–		0	0
Career total			71	1	1	0	0	0	–		72	1

== Honours ==
=== Club ===
Inter Primavera

- Torneo di Viareggio: 2015
