= Isaac Donkor (footballer, born 1995) =

Ghanaian professional footballer

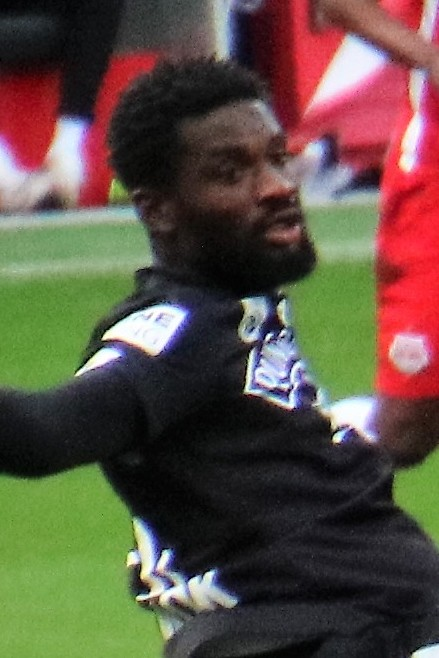
- Donkor in 2020

Personal information
- Date of birth: 15 August 1995 (age 31)
- Place of birth: Kumasi, Ghana
- Height: 1.81 m (5 ft 11 in)
- Position: Centre-back

Team information
- Current team: Mesaimeer
- Number: 5

Youth career
- –2008: U.S. Ogliano
- 2008–2010: Padova
- 2010–2014: Inter

Senior career*
Years	Team	Apps	(Gls)
2012–2017	Inter	2	(0)
2015–2016	→ Bari (loan)	20	(0)
2016–2017	→ Avellino (loan)	7	(0)
2017	→ Cesena (loan)	8	(0)
2017–2018	Cesena	29	(1)
2018–2019	Universitatea Craiova	27	(1)
2019–2020	Sturm Graz	12	(0)
2020–2022	Adanaspor	68	(1)
2022–2024	Sakaryaspor	56	(5)
2024–2025	Adanaspor	28	(0)
2025–	Mesaimeer		

International career
2007	Ghana U17	9	(0)
	Ghana U20	1	(0)
- * Club domestic league appearances and goals as of 14:07, 29 September 2025 (UTC)

Isaac Donkor (born 15 August 1995) is a Ghanaian professional footballer who plays as a centre-back for Qatari Second Division club Mesaimeer.

== Club career ==
Donkor started his professional career with Inter. He made his debut for Inter on 22 November 2012 against FC Rubin Kazan in the Europa League. Donkor, on 13 July 2015 Bari on loan. Donkor, on 6 July 2016 Avellino on loan. Donkor, in January 2017 he was transferred to Cesena on loan. Donkor joined Cesena on a permanent basis on 24 July 2017.

Donkor signed a 3-year contract with Romanian club Universitatea Craiova in July 2018.

On 2 September 2019, he signed a contract with Austrian club Sturm Graz for one year with an extension option.

Donkor joined Turkish club Adanaspor in September 2020.

He signed a 2-year contract with Sakaryaspor in June 2022.

Donkor joined Adanaspor on 29 August 2024.

== Career statistics ==
As of match played 14 April 2025

Appearances and goals by club, season and competition
Club	Season	League			National cup (Note: Includes Coppa Italia, Cupa României, Austrian Cup, Turkish Cup)		Continental		Other		Total	
Club	Season	Division	Apps	Goals	Apps	Goals	Apps	Goals	Apps	Goals	Apps	Goals
Inter Milan	2012–13	Serie A	0	0	0	0	1 (Note: Appearance(s) in UEFA Europa League)	0	—		1	0
Inter Milan	2013–14	Serie A	0	0	1	0	0	0	—		1	0
Inter Milan	2014–15	Serie A	2	0	0	0	1	0	—		3	0
Inter Milan	Total		2	0	1	0	2	0	—		5	0
Bari (loan)	2015–16	Serie B	20	0	0	0	—		—		20	0
Avellino (loan)	2016–17	Serie B	7	0	0	0	—		—		7	0
Cesena (loan)	2016–17	Serie B	8	0	0	0	—		—		8	0
Cesena	2017–18	Serie B	29	1	1	0	—		—		30	1
Universitatea Craiova	2018–19	Liga I	27	0	5	1	2	0	—		34	1
Sturm Graz	2019–20	Austrian Football Bundesliga	12	0	2	0	—		—		14	0
Adanaspor	2020–21	TFF 1. Lig	34	0	2	0	—		—		36	0
Adanaspor	2021–22	TFF 1. Lig	34	1	2	0	—		—		36	1
Adanaspor	Total		68	1	4	0	—		—		72	1
Sakaryaspor	2022–23	TFF 1. Lig	32	5	1	0	—		—		33	5
Sakaryaspor	2023–24	TFF 1. Lig	23	0	1	0	—		1 (Note: Appearance in TFF 1. Lig promotion play-offs)	0	25	0
Sakaryaspor	Total		55	5	2	0	—		1	0	58	5
Adanaspor	2024–25	TFF 1. Lig	28	0	1	0	—		—		29	0
Career total			259	7	16	1	4	0	3	0	282	8
