= Demetrio Steffè =

Italian footballer (born 1996)

Personal information
- Date of birth: 30 July 1996 (age 30)
- Place of birth: Trieste, Italy
- Height: 1.78 m (5 ft 10 in)
- Position: Midfielder

Team information
- Current team: ChievoVerona
- Number: 7

Youth career
- 2002–2008: San Giovanni
- 2008–2012: Triestina
- 2012–2015: Internazionale
- 2013–2014: → Chievo

Senior career*
Years	Team	Apps	(Gls)
2015–2016	Inter Milan	0	(0)
2015–2016	→ Savona (loan)	24	(1)
2016–2017	Teramo	12	(0)
2017	Robur Siena	14	(0)
2017–2018	Trapani	27	(0)
2018–2020	Triestina	55	(4)
2020–2022	Cesena	70	(3)
2022–2024	Potenza	56	(3)
2024–2025	Cjarlins Muzane	32	(2)
2025–	ChievoVerona	17	(2)

International career^{‡}
2011	Italy U-16	7	(0)
2012–2013	Italy U-17	4	(0)
2013–2014	Italy U-18	7	(0)
2014	Italy U-19	1	(0)
- * Club domestic league appearances and goals as of 4 March 2026 ‡ National team caps and goals as of 13 August 2014

Demetrio Steffè (born 30 July 1996) is an Italian footballer who plays as a midfielder for Serie D club ChievoVerona.

== Club career ==
Steffè made his professional debut in the Lega Pro for Savona on 26 September 2015, in a game against Teramo.

On 5 October 2020 he moved to Cesena on a one-season contract with an extension option.

== International ==
Steffè represented the Italy national under-17 football team at the 2013 UEFA European Under-17 Championship, where Italy finished as runners-up, and at the 2013 FIFA U-17 World Cup.
