= Juan Pablo Carrizo =

Argentine footballer (born 1984)

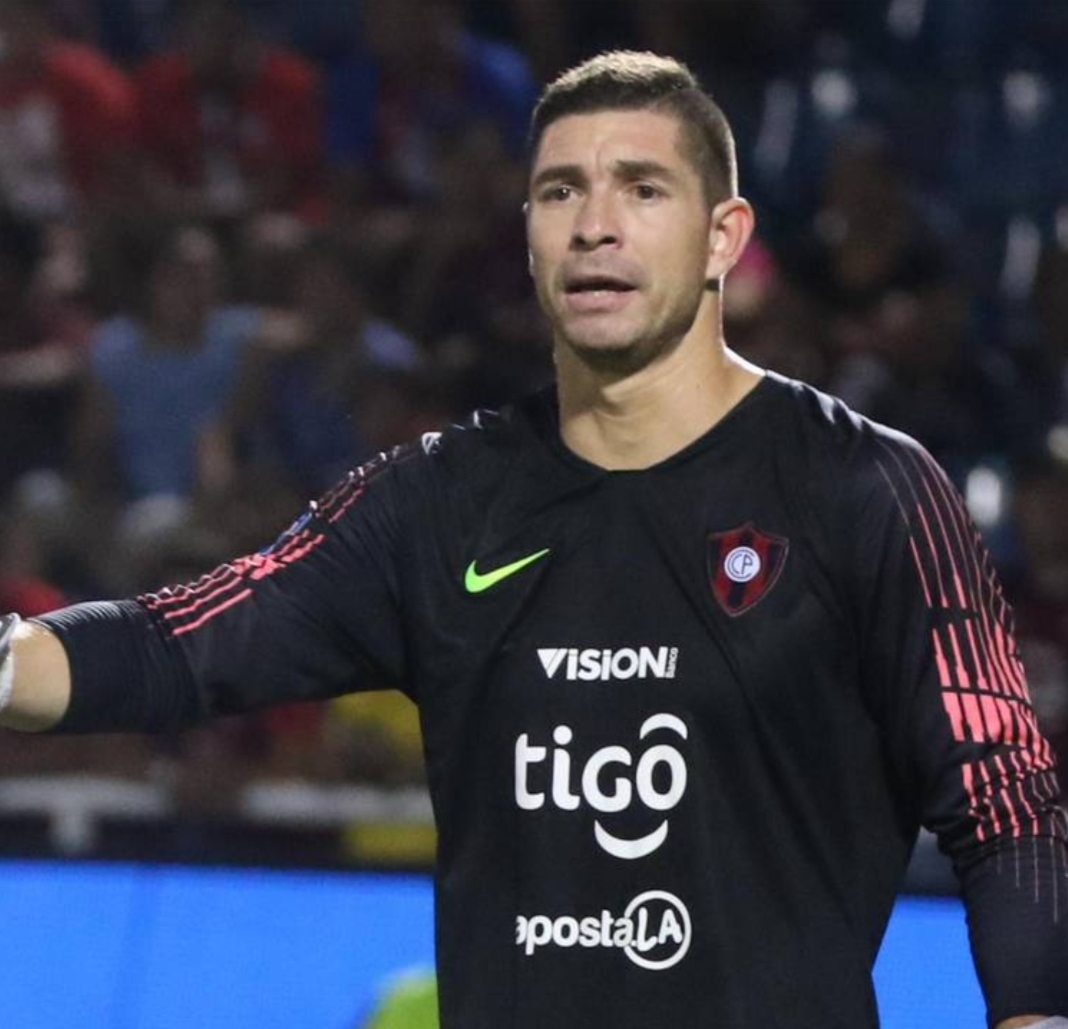
- Carrizo in 2018

Personal information
- Full name: Juan Pablo Carrizo
- Date of birth: 6 May 1984 (age 42)
- Place of birth: Villa Constitución, Argentina
- Height: 1.89 m (6 ft 2 in)
- Position: Goalkeeper

Youth career
- 2001–2005: River Plate

Senior career*
Years	Team	Apps	(Gls)
2005–2008	River Plate	69	(0)
2008–2013	Lazio	25	(0)
2009–2010	→ Zaragoza (loan)	16	(0)
2010–2011	→ River Plate (loan)	34	(0)
2012	→ Catania (loan)	14	(0)
2013–2017	Inter Milan	9	(0)
2017–2018	Monterrey	5	(0)
2019	Cerro Porteño	34	(0)
Total		205	(0)

International career
2007–2012	Argentina	12	(0)
- * Club domestic league appearances and goals

Juan Pablo Carrizo (born 6 May 1984) is an Argentine former professional footballer who played as a goalkeeper.

He started his professional career with River Plate, where he played until 2008, winning the 2008 Clausura. His performances earned him a move to Europe, where he played for Lazio in Italy and on loan for Zaragoza in Spain, before returning at River Plate again, this time on loan. Carrizo was again loaned by Lazio this time to Calcio Catania where he played until June 2012. In January 2013, Inter Milan purchased him as a back-up for Samir Handanović.

A former Argentina international, Carrizo played 12 matches for his country, representing them in 2007 and 2011 editions of Copa América.

== Club career ==
=== River Plate ===
Carrizo made his debut with River Plate on 29 January 2006 against Tiro Federal, keeping a clean sheet in River's 5–0 thrashing of the Rosario club. He played with River Plate until the last game of the 2008 Clausura, helping the team obtain the national championship.

=== Lazio ===
Carrizo was supposed to move to Lazio in the summer (July–August) transfer window of 2007, but the deal fell through over complications regarding Carrizo's eligibility for European citizenship. He finally registered with the Lega Nazionale Professionisti on 6 June 2008.

On 8 July 2008, Carrizo arrived in Rome and was formally presented to the media and fans as a Lazio player for the first time, stating his ambition of winning the Derby della Capitale against local rivals Roma.

However, Carrizo's lost his place as first-choice goalkeeper during his first season after a 4–1 home defeat to Cagliari on 25 January 2009 when coach Delio Rossi opted to replace him with Uruguayan Fernando Muslera. Throughout his time on the Lazio bench, Carrizo repeatedly voiced his discontent at losing his place, and thus Lazio elected to fine him €20,000.

==== Loan at Zaragoza ====
At the end of the season, Carrizo was loaned out to newly promoted Spanish club Real Zaragoza as part of the deal which saw Matuzalém become a permanent Lazio player until 2012. He was forced to share his spot as the number one goalkeeper due to strong competition with Roberto Jiménez Gago and Javier López Vallejo, but managed to make 16 league appearances, in addition, one Copa del Rey match, as the team avoided the relegation in the final weeks.

==== Loan at River Plate ====
On 18 June 2010, he returned on loan to River Plate, where he signed until 30 June 2011.

==== Loan at Catania ====
On 31 January 2012, Carrizo was loaned out with option rights to Catania replacing its former goalkeeper Mariano Andújar who had returned on loan to Estudiantes de la Plata in Argentina following a fallout with the club's directors. Carrizo made his debut for the club on 22 February 2012, making three decisive saves and keeping a clean sheet in a 0–1 away victory over Siena.

=== Inter Milan ===
On 31 January 2013, in the last day of winter transfer window, Carrizo joined fellow Serie A side Inter Milan for a fee of €250,000. In his presentation one week later, Carrizo said that "it is an honour to join Inter", adding "I want to do my bit for the team both on and off the pitch." The Argentinian served as a second choice goalkeeper after Luca Castellazzi suffered an injury. Carrizo made his debut for the club against Bologna in Serie A on 10 March 2013, as Inter suffered a 1–0 home defeat at San Siro. This was his first and only appearance for 2012–13 season, and Inter finished the Serie A season in a disappointing 9th place. After the season finished, he extended his contract until 2015.

During the 2013 International Champions Cup, held in United States of America, in the team's final match against Juventus for seventh place, Carrizo made 2 penalty saves and also scored a penalty kick himself, helping the team to win 9–8 on penalties. Carrizo played his first official appearance for the new season on 20 October 2013 in an away match against Torino, coming on to replace Samir Handanović, who was sent off (Carrizo in fact entered the field by replacing Kovačić), and save a penalty kick against Alessio Cerci in an evidential 3–3 draw at Stadio Olimpico. Six days later, in a league game against Hellas Verona, Carrizo played his first match as a starter in a 4–2 win over in San Siro. In December 2013, Carrizo made his first Coppa Italia appearance for Inter, playing full 90 minutes in a 3–2 win over against Trapani.

Carrizo made a notable performance for Inter in a friendly match against Real Madrid in Berkeley, California on 26 July 2014 in the 2014 International Champions Cup where he made two saves, contributing to Inter's penalty shootout victory over the current European Champions, earning him a Man of the Match award. On 30 June, Inter announced Carrizo had extended his Inter contract until 2017.

On 2 March 2016, in the returning leg of Coppa Italia's semi-final against Juventus at San Siro, Carrizo started the match and made several vital saves, including one in the 120 minute against Álvaro Morata, helping Inter overturn the 3–0 defeat and equal the aggregate 3–3, which led the match into the penalty shootouts; he did not save any of Juventus' penalties, as Inter lost 5–3 and eventually was eliminated from the competition.

Carrizo made his first competitive appearance of 2016–17 season on 24 November 2016 in the matchday 5 of 2016–17 UEFA Europa League group stage against Hapoel Be'er Sheva, entering as a substitute for Handanović who was sent-off in the 69th minute, conceding two times in an eventual 3–2 away defeat, which confirmed the elimination of Inter from Europa League. In the final matchday against Sparta Prague, Carrizo made a notable match, saving a Bořek Dočkal penalty, helping Inter to finish the European season with a win.

On 28 May 2017, Inter announced that Carrizo would leave the club after the season. On the same day, Carrizo was the starting keeper for the team against Udinese, a match in the last round of 2016–17 Serie A.

=== Monterrey ===
On 7 June 2017, CF Monterrey announced the signing of Juan Pablo Carrizo as a free agent.

== International career ==
Carrizo made his international debut for Argentina against Chile on 18 April 2007. He was the first choice goalkeeper during Diego Maradona's first games as Argentina's coach during 2009.

== Career statistics ==
=== Club ===
Appearances and goals by club, season and competition
Club	Season	League			Cup		Continental		Total	
Club	Season	Division	Apps	Goals	Apps	Goals	Apps	Goals	Apps	Goals
River Plate	2004–05	Argentine Primera División	0	0	0	0	—		0	0
River Plate	2005–06	Argentine Primera División	6	0	0	0	—		6	0
River Plate	2006–07	Argentine Primera División	36	0	0	0	—		36	0
River Plate	2007–08	Argentine Primera División	26	0	0	0	8 (Note: All appearance(s) in Copa Libertadores)	0	34	0
River Plate	Total		68	0	0	0	8	0	76	0
Lazio	2008–09	Serie A	23	0	1	0	—		24	0
Lazio	2011–12	Serie A	2	0	0	0	0	0	2	0
Lazio	2012–13	Serie A	0	0	1	0	0	0	1	0
Lazio	Total		25	0	2	0	0	0	27	0
Real Zaragoza (loan)	2009–10	La Liga	16	0	1	0	—		17	0
River Plate (loan)	2010–11	Argentine Primera División	34	0	0	0	—		34	0
Catania (loan)	2011–12	Serie A	14	0	0	0	—		14	0
Inter Milan	2012–13	Serie A	1	0	0	0	0	0	1	0
Inter Milan	2013–14	Serie A	4	0	2	0	—		6	0
Inter Milan	2014–15	Serie A	1	0	2	0	9 (Note: All appearance(s) in UEFA Europa League)	0	12	0
Inter Milan	2015–16	Serie A	2	0	2	0	—		4	0
Inter Milan	2016–17	Serie A	1	0	1	0	2	0	4	0
Inter Milan	Total		9	0	7	0	11	0	27	0
Monterrey	2017–18	Liga MX	5	0	13	0	—		18	0
Monterrey	2018–19	Liga MX	0	0	8	0	—		8	0
Monterrey	Total		5	0	21	0	—		26	0
Cerro Porteño	2019	Paraguayan Primera División	34	0	—		7	0	41	0
Career total			205	0	31	0	26	0	262	0

=== International ===
As of 6 January 2017

Appearances and goals by national team and year
National team	Year	Apps	Goals
Argentina	2007	1	0
Argentina	2008	6	0
Argentina	2009	3	0
Argentina	2011	2	0
Argentina	Total	12	0

== Honours ==
River Plate

- Primera División: 2008 Clausura

Lazio

- Coppa Italia: 2008–09

Monterrey

- Copa MX: Apertura 2017

Argentina

- Copa América runner-up: 2007
