= Axel Bakayoko =

French footballer (born 1998)

Personal information
- Full name: Axel Mohamed Bakayoko
- Date of birth: 6 January 1998 (age 28)
- Place of birth: Paris, France
- Height: 1.79 m (5 ft 10 1/2 in)
- Positions: Winger; right back

Team information
- Current team: Rapperswil-Jona
- Number: 93

Youth career
- 2006–2008: OFC Pantin
- 2008–2014: Red Star
- 2014–2017: Inter Milan

Senior career*
Years	Team	Apps	(Gls)
2016–2021	Inter Milan	0	(0)
2017–2018	→ Sochaux (loan)	17	(1)
2017–2018	→ Sochaux II (loan)	4	(0)
2018–2020	→ St. Gallen (loan)	54	(4)
2021–2022	Red Star Belgrade	5	(0)
2023	Cheonan City	12	(0)
2024	Tabor Sežana	10	(2)
2024–2025	Casertana	20	(0)
2025–	Rapperswil-Jona	27	(2)

International career^{‡}
2018	France U20	3	(1)
- * Club domestic league appearances and goals as of 30 September 2026 ‡ National team caps and goals as of 8 August 2020

Axel Mohamed Bakayoko (born 6 January 1998) is a French professional footballer who plays as a winger for Swiss Challenge League club Rapperswil-Jona.

== Club career ==
=== Inter Milan ===
Bakayoko made his UEFA Europa League debut for Inter Milan on 8 December 2016 against Sparta Prague. He replaced Andrea Pinamonti after 80 minutes.

==== Loan to Sochaux ====
He joined French club Sochaux on 10 July 2017 for a season-long loan. He made his Ligue 2 debut on 28 July as a substitute replacing Aldo Kalulu in the 65th minute of a 2–0 home win over Bourg-Péronnas. On 8 August he played in the first round of the Coupe de la Ligue in a 3–1 away defeat against Valenciennes, he was replaced by Florin Berenguer after 70 minutes. On 19 September, Bakayoko played his first match as a starter in Ligue 2, a 1–0 away defeat against Le Havre, he was replaced by Thomas Robinet in the 74th minute. On 6 February 2018, Bakayoko played his first match in Coupe de France as a substitute replacing Florian Martin in the 34th minute of a 4–1 home defeat against Paris Saint-Germain. On 6 April he scored his first professional goal, as a substitute, in the 89th minute of a 3–2 home win over Orléans. Bakayoko ended his loan to Sochaux with 19 appearances, one goal and one assist, he also played four matches in the reserve team in Championnat National 3.

==== Loan to St. Gallen ====
On 17 July 2018, Inter announced that they had loaned out Bakayoko to Swiss club FC St. Gallen for the whole 2018/19 season. Bakayoko had a good season with the Swiss side, playing 34 games for the club in that season, many of them as right back although his usual position was on the wing. At the end of the season it was confirmed, that Bakayoko would stay one more season at the club, still on loan from Inter.

=== Red Star Belgrade ===
On 22 December 2020, Bakayoko signed a three-and-a-half-year contract with Serbian club Red Star Belgrade.

==== Loan to Novi Pazar ====
On 7 February 2022 Bakayoko was loaned to Serbian Superliga side Novi Pazar until the end of 2021–22 season. The loan fell through and he did not appear for Novi Pazar.

=== Cheonan City FC ===
On 21 March 2023, Bakayoko joined Cheonan City FC of South Korean K League 2.

=== Casertana ===
On 24 August 2024, Bakayoko signed a two-season contract with Casertana in Italian Serie C.

== Personal life ==
Bakayoko is born in France and is of Ivorian descent.

== Honours ==
=== Club ===
Inter Milan Primavera

- Coppa Italia Primavera: 2015–16
- Campionato Primavera: 2016–17

Red Star Belgrade

- Serbian SuperLiga (2): 2020–21, 2021–22
- Serbian Cup (2): 2020–21, 2021–22
