= Savona FBC =

Italian football club

Savona
- Full name: Savona Foot-Ball Club S.r.l.
- Nicknames: Biancoblù (The White & Blue); Gli Striscioni (The Striped Ones); I Siderurgici (The Steelmakers)
- Founded: 1907; 119 years ago 2020; 6 years ago as Pro Savona; 2023; 3 years ago as Savona FBC
- Ground: Stadio Valerio Bacigalupo, Savona, Italy
- Capacity: 4,496
- Chairman: Aldo Dellepiane
- Head coach: Alessandro Siciliano
- League: Promozione
- 2024–25: Prima Categoria Liguria Group B, 1st
Home colours	Away colours

Savona Foot-Ball Club is an Italian football club located in Savona, Liguria. It currently plays in Promozione and the home matches are played at Stadio Valerio Bacigalupo.

== History ==
The club was founded in 1907 by Cesare Lanza and Nicolò Pessano and disputed its first championship in the 1910. Savona's history includes two seasons in the Italian Football Championship in the 1920s, and many seasons in Serie B (the last one in 1966–67).

After spending some time in Serie C the team was relegated to Serie D and has remained there for about 20 years, only having two seasons in Serie C2 between 2002 and 2004 before being relegated back. In this period Savona has won its only trophy, the Coppa Italia Dilettanti in 1991.

In the season 2009–10 it was promoted from Serie D to Lega Pro Seconda Divisione but on 23 December 2011 the club, in strong financial difficulty, was declared in bankruptcy by the court of Savona. On 13 March 2012 Aldo Dellepiane, at the auction proceedings took over the company for one euro, taking on a proportionally portion of the debts, saving it from radiation. On its first season under the new company, Savona won promotion to Lega Pro Prima Divisione. In the 2013–14 season, Savona emerged as a surprise package for Serie B promotion, reaching sixth place in the final standings and eliminating Vicenza in the subsequent promotion playoffs, before being defeated by eventual winners Pro Vercelli in the semi-finals. In 2014–2015 season, Savona played in Lega Pro, struggling to avoid relegation in Serie D.

In summer 2015 it was penalized of 6 points for sporting fraud.

== Colours and badge ==
The colours of the team are white and blue. The badge is an oval with white and blue stripes and the club's name. The red and white shield topped with an eagle represents the city's coat of arms.

== Honours ==
- Coppa Italia Dilettanti
  - Winners: 1990–91
