= 2017–18 Inter Milan season =

Internazionale
2017–18 season
- President: Erick Thohir
- Manager: Luciano Spalletti
- Stadium: San Siro
- Serie A: 4th
- Coppa Italia: Quarter-finals
- Top goalscorer: League: Mauro Icardi (29); All: Mauro Icardi (29)
- Highest home attendance: 78,328 vs Milan (15 October 2017, Serie A)
- Lowest home attendance: 25,956 vs Pordenone (12 December 2017, Coppa Italia)
- Average home league attendance: 59,366
Home colours	Away colours	Third colours

The 2017–18 season was Football Club Internazionale Milano's 109th in existence and 102nd consecutive season in the top flight of Italian football. The side competed only in domestic tournaments; Serie A and the Coppa Italia.

On 20 May 2018, the final game of the season, Inter beat Lazio 3–2 at the Stadio Olimpico to qualify for the UEFA Champions League for the first time in six seasons.

== Kits ==
Home	Home Anniversary	Away	Away alt. 1	Away alt. 2	Third
Goalkeeper 1	Goalkeeper 2	Goalkeeper 3

== Season overview ==
Former AS Roma coach Luciano Spalletti signed for Inter in early June. During the years he led Roma, the giallorossi won the Coppa Italia twice as well as a Super Cup against the nerazzurri.

== Players ==
=== Squad information ===
As of 30 June 2018

Squad no.	Name	Nationality	Position	Date of birth (age)
Goalkeepers
1	Samir Handanović	(Slovenia)	GK	14 July 1984 (aged 33)
27	Daniele Padelli ^{HG}	(Italy)	GK	25 October 1985 (aged 32)
46	Tommaso Berni ^{HG}	(Italy)	GK	6 March 1983 (aged 35)
Defenders
2	Lisandro López (on loan from Benfica)	(Argentina)	CB/RB	1 September 1989 (aged 28)
7	João Cancelo (on loan from Valencia)	(Portugal)	RB/RW	27 May 1994 (aged 24)
13	Andrea Ranocchia ^{HG}	(Italy)	CB	16 February 1988 (aged 30)
21	Davide Santon ^{CT}	(Italy)	LB/RB	2 January 1991 (aged 27)
25	Miranda	(Brazil)	CB	7 September 1984 (aged 33)
29	Dalbert	(Brazil)	LB/LW	5 September 1993 (aged 24)
33	Danilo D'Ambrosio ^{HG}	(Italy)	RB/LB	9 September 1988 (aged 29)
37	Milan Škriniar	(Slovakia)	CB	11 February 1995 (aged 23)
Midfielders
5	Roberto Gagliardini (on loan from Atalanta) ^{HG}	(Italy)	DM/CM	8 April 1994 (aged 24)
8	Rafinha (on loan from Barcelona)	(Brazil)	AM/CM	12 February 1993 (aged 25)
11	Matías Vecino	(Uruguay)	CM/DM	24 August 1991 (aged 26)
20	Borja Valero	(Spain)	CM/AM	12 January 1985 (aged 33)
77	Marcelo Brozović	(Croatia)	CM/AM	16 November 1992 (aged 25)
Forwards
9	Mauro Icardi (Captain) ^{HG}	(Argentina)	ST	19 February 1993 (aged 25)
17	Yann Karamoh ^{U21} (on loan from Caen)	(France)	RW/LW	8 July 1998 (aged 19)
23	Éder	(Italy)	ST/LW	15 November 1986 (aged 31)
44	Ivan Perišić	(Croatia)	LW/RW	2 February 1989 (aged 29)
87	Antonio Candreva ^{HG}	(Italy)	RW/LW	28 February 1987 (aged 31)
99	Andrea Pinamonti ^{U21}	(Italy)	ST	19 May 1999 (aged 19)

- Note: Lega Serie A imposes a cap on the first team squad at 25 players with additional requirements on homegrown players (marked as ^{HG}) and club-trained players (marked as ^{CT}), with exclusion for club-trained under-21 players (marked as ^{U21}).

== Transfers ==
=== In ===
Date	Pos.	Player	Age	Moving from	Type	Fee	Source
Summer
3 July 2017	GK	(Italy) Daniele Padelli	31	(Italy) Torino	Transfer	Free	
5 July 2017	MF	(Italy) Nicolò Zaniolo	18	(Italy) Virtus Entella	Transfer	€1.75m	
5 July 2017	FW	(Denmark) Jens Odgaard	18	(Denmark) Lyngby BK	Transfer	Undisclosed	
7 July 2017	DF	(Slovakia) Milan Škriniar	22	(Italy) Sampdoria	Transfer	€23m	
10 July 2017	MF	(Spain) Borja Valero	32	(Italy) Fiorentina	Transfer	€7m	
1 August 2017	MF	(Italy) Roberto Gagliardini	24	(Italy) Atalanta	Transfer	€23m	
2 August 2017	MF	(Uruguay) Matías Vecino	25	(Italy) Fiorentina	Transfer	€24m	
9 August 2017	DF	(Brazil) Dalbert	23	(France) Nice	Transfer	€20m	
31 August 2017	DF	(Italy) Alessandro Bastoni	18	(Italy) Atalanta	Transfer	€31m	
31 August 2017	MF	(Honduras) Rigoberto Rivas	19	(Italy) Prato	Transfer	Undisclosed	
20 September 2017	FW	(Argentina) Facundo Colidio	17	(Argentina) Boca Juniors	Transfer	Undisclosed	
30 June 2017	GK	(Italy) Davide Costa	21	(Italy) Vicenza	Loan return		
30 June 2017	GK	(Italy) Raffaele Di Gennaro	23	(Italy) Ternana	Loan return		
30 June 2017	GK	(Italy) Francesco Bardi	25	(Italy) Frosinone	Loan return		
30 June 2017	DF	(Turkey) Caner Erkin	28	(Turkey) Beşiktaş	Loan return		
30 June 2017	DF	(Brazil) Juan Jesus	26	(Italy) Roma	Loan return		
30 June 2017	DF	(Italy) Andrea Ranocchia	29	(England) Hull City	Loan return		
30 June 2017	DF	(Ghana) Isaac Donkor	21	(Italy) Cesena	Loan return		
30 June 2017	DF	(Belgium) Senna Miangue	20	(Italy) Cagliari	Loan return		
30 June 2017	DF	(Italy) Andrea Bandini	23	(Italy) Mantova	Loan return		
30 June 2017	DF	(Italy) Fabio Della Giovanna	20	(Italy) Ternana	Loan return		
30 June 2017	DF	(Italy) Alessandro Sobacchi	19	(Italy) Caravaggio	Loan return		
30 June 2017	DF	(Ghana) Bright Gyamfi	21	(Italy) Benevento	Loan return		
30 June 2017	DF	(Italy) Federico Dimarco	19	(Italy) Empoli	Loan return		
30 June 2017	DF	(Italy) Fabio Eguelfi	22	(Italy) Pro Vercelli	Loan return		
30 June 2017	DF	(Italy) Giacomo Sciacca	21	(Italy) Piacenza	Loan return		
30 June 2017	DF	(Italy) Filippo Sgarbi	19	(Italy) Caronnese	Loan return		
30 June 2017	DF	(Italy) Nicolò Gazzotti	20	(Italy) Santarcangelo	Loan return		
30 June 2017	MF	(Brazil) Felipe Melo	33	(Brazil) Palmeiras	Loan return		
30 June 2017	MF	(Algeria) Saphir Taïder	25	(Italy) Bologna	Loan return		
30 June 2017	MF	(Ivory Coast) Assane Gnoukouri	20	(Italy) Udinese	Loan return		
30 June 2017	MF	(Guinea) Gaston Camara	21	(Italy) Brescia	Loan return		
30 June 2017	MF	(Italy) Lorenzo Tassi	22	(Italy) FeralpiSalò	Loan return		
30 June 2017	MF	(Italy) Andrea Romanò	23	(Italy) Reggina	Loan return		
30 June 2017	MF	(Ghana) Edmund Hottor	24	(Portugal) Fafe	Loan return		
30 June 2017	MF	(Italy) Niccolò Belloni	22	(Italy) Avellino	Loan return		
30 June 2017	MF	(Italy) Andrea Palazzi	21	(Italy) Pro Vercelli	Loan return		
30 June 2017	MF	(Denmark) Morten Knudsen	22	(Italy) Reggina	Loan return		
30 June 2017	MF	(Italy) Riccardo Gaiola	21	(Italy) Padova	Loan return		
30 June 2017	MF	(Italy) Enrico Baldini	20	(Italy) Pro Vercelli	Loan return		
30 June 2017	MF	(Italy) Mattia Bonetto	20	(Italy) Renate	Loan return		
30 June 2017	MF	(Italy) Enrico De Micheli	20	(Italy) Carrarese	Loan return		
30 June 2017	FW	(Montenegro) Stevan Jovetić	27	(Spain) Sevilla	Loan return		
30 June 2017	FW	(Italy) Francesco Forte	24	(Italy) Perugia	Loan return		
30 June 2017	FW	(Italy) Samuele Longo	25	(Spain) Girona	Loan return		
30 June 2017	FW	(Italy) Gianluca Caprari	23	(Italy) Pescara	Loan return		
30 June 2017	FW	(Albania) Rey Manaj	20	(Italy) Pisa	Loan return		
30 June 2017	FW	(Italy) Vincenzo Tommasone	22	(Italy) Reggina	Loan return		
30 June 2017	FW	(Guinea-Bissau) Zé Turbo	20	(Spain) Marbella	Loan return		
30 June 2017	FW	(Romania) George Pușcaș	21	(Italy) Benevento	Loan return		
30 June 2017	FW	(Nigeria) Roberto Ogunseye	22	(Italy) Olbia	Loan return		
22 August 2017	DF	(Portugal) João Cancelo	23	(Spain) Valencia	Loan		
31 August 2017	FW	(France) Yann Karamoh	19	(France) Caen	Loan		
Winter
10 January 2018	MF	(Italy) Loris Zonta	20	(Italy) Pisa	Loan return		
17 January 2018	FW	(Guinea-Bissau) Zé Turbo	21	(Italy) Catania	Loan return		
24 January 2018	FW	(Brazil) Gabriel Barbosa	21	(Portugal) Benfica	Loan return		
28 January 2018	FW	(Romania) George Pușcaș	21	(Italy) Benevento	Loan return		
30 January 2018	GK	(Italy) Davide Costa	21	(Italy) Gubbio	Loan return		
30 January 2018	DF	(Italy) Andrea Cagnano	19	(Italy) Santarcangelo	Loan return		
30 January 2018	FW	(Guinea) Moussa Souare	19	(Italy) Monopoli	Loan return		
15 January 2018	DF	(Argentina) Lisandro López	28	(Portugal) Benfica	Loan	€0.5m	
22 January 2018	MF	(Brazil) Rafinha	24	(Spain) Barcelona	Loan		

=== Out ===
Date	Pos.	Player	Age	Moving to	Type	Fee	Source
Summer
1 July 2017	GK	(Argentina) Juan Pablo Carrizo	33	(Mexico) Monterrey (free agent)	Transfer	Free	
1 July 2017	DF	(Turkey) Caner Erkin	28	(Turkey) Beşiktaş	Transfer	€0.75m	
1 July 2017	DF	(Brazil) Juan Jesus	26	(Italy) Roma	Transfer	€8m	
1 July 2017	DF	(Italy) Federico Dimarco	19	(Switzerland) Sion	Transfer	€3.91m	
1 July 2017	DF	(Guadeloupe) Andreaw Gravillon	19	(Italy) Benevento	Transfer	€4m	
1 July 2017	DF	(Italy) Fabio Eguelfi	22	(Italy) Atalanta	Transfer	€6m	
1 July 2017	DF	(Belgium) Senna Miangue	20	(Italy) Cagliari	Transfer	€3.2m	
1 July 2017	DF	(Ghana) Bright Gyamfi	21	(Italy) Benevento	Transfer	€0.23m	
1 July 2017	MF	(Brazil) Felipe Melo	33	(Brazil) Palmeiras (free agent)	Transfer	Free	
1 July 2017	MF	(Algeria) Saphir Taïder	25	(Italy) Bologna	Transfer	€2m	
1 July 2017	MF	(Argentina) Éver Banega	28	(Spain) Sevilla	Transfer	€7.7m	
1 July 2017	FW	(Italy) Gianluca Caprari	23	(Italy) Sampdoria	Transfer	€15m	
7 July 2017	DF	(Italy) Marco Andreolli	31	(Italy) Cagliari (free agent)	Transfer	Free	
11 July 2017	DF	(Italy) Alessandro Sobacchi	19	(Italy) Ciserano	Transfer	Undisclosed	
12 July 2017	FW	(Nigeria) Roberto Ogunseye	22	(Italy) Olbia	Transfer	Undisclosed	
13 July 2017	DF	(Italy) Giacomo Sciacca	21	(Italy) Alessandria	Transfer	Undisclosed	
21 July 2017	DF	(Ivory Coast) Yao Eloge Koffi	21	(Switzerland) Lugano	Transfer	Undisclosed	
24 July 2017	DF	(Ghana) Isaac Donkor	21	(Italy) Cesena	Transfer	Undisclosed	
26 July 2017	MF	(Italy) Enrico Baldini	20	(Italy) Ascoli	Transfer	Undisclosed	
4 August 2017	DF	(Italy) Lorenzo Matteo	20	(Italy) Rignanese	Transfer	Free	
11 August 2017	MF	(Chile) Gary Medel	30	(Turkey) Beşiktaş	Transfer	Undisclosed	
17 August 2017	FW	(Argentina) Rodrigo Palacio	35	(Italy) Bologna (free agent)	Transfer	Free	
28 August 2017	MF	(Italy) Enrico De Micheli	20	(Italy) Renate	Transfer	Undisclosed	
29 August 2017	FW	(Montenegro) Stevan Jovetić	27	(France) Monaco	Transfer		
30 August 2017	DF	(Italy) Fabio Della Giovanna	20	(Italy) SPAL	Transfer	Undisclosed	
6 December 2017	DF	(Italy) Nicolò Gazzotti	20	(Italy) Pro Sesto	Transfer	Free	
30 June 2017	DF	(Australia) Trent Sainsbury	25	(China) Jiangsu Suning	Loan return		
7 July 2017	MF	(Italy) Marco Carraro	19	(Italy) Pescara	Loan		
7 July 2017	MF	(Italy) Andrea Palazzi	21	(Italy) Pescara	Loan		
7 July 2017	FW	(Romania) George Pușcaș	21	(Italy) Benevento	Loan		
11 July 2017	MF	(France) Axel Mohamed Bakayoko	19	(France) Sochaux	Loan		
11 July 2017	MF	(Italy) Mattia Bonetto	20	(Italy) Prato	Loan		
12 July 2017	GK	(Italy) Raffaele Di Gennaro	23	(Italy) Spezia	Loan		
12 July 2017	GK	(Italy) Michele Di Gregorio	19	(Italy) Renate	Loan		
12 July 2017	DF	(Italy) Alessandro Mattioli	19	(Italy) Renate	Loan		
12 July 2017	FW	(Italy) Francesco Forte	24	(Italy) Spezia	Loan		
13 July 2017	MF	(Italy) Andrea Romanò	23	(Italy) Monza	Loan		
15 July 2017	GK	(Romania) Ionuț Radu	20	(Italy) Avellino	Loan		
17 July 2017	GK	(Italy) Francesco Bardi	25	(Italy) Frosinone	Loan		
17 July 2017	DF	(Italy) Filippo Sgarbi	19	(Italy) Südtirol	Loan		
18 July 2017	MF	(Italy) Mel Taufer	19	(Italy) Arzachena	Loan		
19 July 2017	DF	(Italy) Andrea Cagnano	19	(Italy) Santarcangelo	Loan		
19 July 2017	MF	(Italy) Riccardo Gaiola	21	(Italy) Santarcangelo	Loan		
2 August 2017	MF	(Guinea) Gaston Camara	21	(Portugal) Gil Vicente	Loan		
7 August 2017	MF	(France) Jonathan Biabiany	29	(Czech Republic) Sparta Prague	Loan		
9 August 2017	GK	(Italy) Davide Costa	21	(Italy) Gubbio	Loan		
11 August 2017	FW	(Guinea) Moussa Souare	19	(Italy) Monopoli	Loan		
18 August 2017	DF	(Colombia) Jeison Murillo	25	(Spain) Valencia	Loan		
21 August 2017	MF	(France) Geoffrey Kondogbia	24	(Spain) Valencia	Loan		
23 August 2017	FW	(Italy) Samuele Longo	25	(Spain) Tenerife	Loan		
24 August 2017	FW	(Guinea-Bissau) Zé Turbo	20	(Italy) Catania	Loan		
30 August 2017	DF	(Brazil) Ítalo	21	(Portugal) Olhanense	Loan		
30 August 2017	FW	(Albania) Rey Manaj	20	(Spain) Granada	Loan		
31 August 2017	DF	(Argentina) Cristian Ansaldi	30	(Italy) Torino	Loan		
31 August 2017	DF	(Italy) Andrea Bandini	23	(Italy) Brescia	Loan		
31 August 2017	DF	(Italy) Alessandro Bastoni	18	(Italy) Atalanta	Loan		
31 August 2017	MF	(Italy) Niccolò Belloni	23	(Italy) Carpi	Loan		
31 August 2017	MF	(Honduras) Rigoberto Rivas	19	(Italy) Brescia	Loan		
31 August 2017	MF	(Italy) Lorenzo Tassi	22	(Italy) Vicenza	Loan		
31 August 2017	FW	(Brazil) Gabriel Barbosa	21	(Portugal) Benfica	Loan		
31 August 2017	FW	(Italy) Vincenzo Tommasone	22	(Italy) Santarcangelo	Loan		
Winter
10 January 2018	MF	(Italy) Loris Zonta	20	(Italy) Bassano Virtus	Transfer	Undisclosed	
19 January 2018	FW	(Guinea-Bissau) Zé Turbo	21	(Portugal) Olhanense	Loan		
25 January 2018	FW	(Brazil) Gabriel Barbosa	21	(Brazil) Santos	Loan		
26 January 2018	MF	(Portugal) João Mário	25	(England) West Ham	Loan	€1.5m	
29 January 2018	FW	(Romania) George Pușcaș	21	(Italy) Novara	Loan		
31 January 2018	GK	(Italy) Davide Costa	21	(Italy) Bassano Virtus	Loan		
31 January 2018	DF	(Italy) Andrea Cagnano	19	(Italy) Pisa	Loan		
31 January 2018	DF	(Belgium) Zinho Vanheusden	18	(Belgium) Standard Liège	Loan		
31 January 2018	DF	(Japan) Yuto Nagatomo	31	(Turkey) Galatasaray	Loan		
31 January 2018	FW	(Guinea) Moussa Souare	19	(Malta) Mosta	Loan		

== Pre-season and friendlies ==
9 July 2017 Friendly	Internazionale	2–1	WSG Wattens	Bruneck
17:30 CEST (UTC+02:00)	Pinamonti 27'; Rover 86'	Report	Zangerl 75'	Stadium: Riscone di Brunico; Referee: Daniel Amabile

15 July 2017 Friendly	Internazionale	1–2	Nürnberg	Bruneck
17:00 CEST (UTC+02:00)	Éder 65'	Report	Gíslason 10'; Ishak 16'	Stadium: Riscone di Brunico; Referee: Nicola Cecchin

21 July 2017 Friendly	Internazionale	1–1	Schalke 04	Changzhou, China
21:35 CST (UTC+08:00)	Murillo 73'	Report	Caligiuri 60'	Stadium: Changzhou Olympic Sports Center New City Stadium; Referee: Gu Chunhan (China)

6 August 2017 Friendly	Internazionale	3–1	Villarreal	San Benedetto del Tronto
20:30 CEST (UTC+02:00)	Éder 26'; Jovetić 67'; Brozović 90'	Report	Soldado 40'; Ruiz (yellow card) 56'; Semedo (yellow card) 85'	Stadium: Stadio Riviera delle Palme; Referee: Michael Fabbri

12 August 2017 Friendly	Internazionale	1–0	Real Betis	Lecce
20:30 CEST (UTC+02:00)	Icardi 30' (pen.); Handanović (yellow card) 70'; Gagliardini (yellow card) 83'	Report	Adán (yellow card) 19'; Matías Nahuel (yellow card) 47'; León (yellow card) 70'	Stadium: Stadio Via del Mare; Referee: Marco Di Bello

=== International Champions Cup ===
24 July 2017 ICC	Internazionale	1–0	Lyon	Nanjing, China
20:05 CST (UTC+08:00)	D'Ambrosio (yellow card) 16'; Jovetić 74'	Report	Darder (yellow card) 45'	Stadium: Nanjing Olympic Sports Centre; Referee: Ma Ning (China)

27 July 2017 ICC	Bayern Munich	0–2	Internazionale	Kallang, Singapore
19:35 SST (UTC+08:00)	F. Götze (yellow card) 59'	Report	Éder 9', 30'	Stadium: National Stadium; Attendance: 23,388; Referee: Jansen Foo (Singapore)

29 July 2017 ICC	Chelsea	1–2	Internazionale	Kallang, Singapore
19:35 SST (UTC+08:00)	Kondogbia 75' (o.g.)	Report	Jovetić 45+3'; Perišić 53'	Stadium: National Stadium; Attendance: 32,574; Referee: Sukhbir Singh (Singapore)

== Competitions ==
=== Serie A ===
==== League table ====
Pos	Team	Pld	W	D	L	GF	GA	GD	Pts	Qualification or relegation
2	Napoli	38	28	7	3	77	29	+48	91	Qualification to Champions League group stage
3	Roma	38	23	8	7	61	28	+33	77	Qualification to Champions League group stage
4	Internazionale	38	20	12	6	66	30	+36	72	Qualification to Champions League group stage
5	Lazio	38	21	9	8	89	49	+40	71 (Note: Lazio were deducted 1 point by the Italian Football Federation)	Qualification to Europa League group stage (Note: Since the winners of the 2017–18 Coppa Italia, Juventus, qualified for European competition based on league position, the spot awarded to the cup winners (Europa League group stage) was passed to the sixth-placed team and the spot awarded to the sixth-placed team (Europa League second qualifying round) was passed to the seventh-placed team.)
6	Milan (Note: Milan was originally banned from European competition due to violations against Financial Fair Play regulations. They appealed to the Court of Arbitration for Sport, and the ban was overturned on 20 July 2018.)	38	18	10	10	56	42	+14	64	Qualification to Europa League group stage

Source: Serie A, Soccerway
Rules for classification: 1) Points; 2) Head-to-head points; 3) Head-to-head goal difference; 4) Goal difference; 5) Goals scored; 6) Draw.

==== Results summary ====
Overall								Home						Away					
Pld	W	D	L	GF	GA	GD	Pts	W	D	L	GF	GA	GD	W	D	L	GF	GA	GD
38	20	12	6	66	30	+36	72	11	5	3	37	16	+21	9	7	3	29	14	+15

Last updated: 20 May 2018.
Source: Competitive matches

==== Results by round ====
Round	1	2	3	4	5	6	7	8	9	10	11	12	13	14	15	16	17	18	19	20	21	22	23	24	25	26	27	28	29	30	31	32	33	34	35	36	37	38
Ground	H	A	H	A	A	H	A	H	A	H	A	H	H	A	H	A	H	A	H	A	H	A	H	H	A	H	A	H	A	H	A	A	H	A	H	A	H	A
Result	W	W	W	W	D	W	W	W	D	W	W	D	W	W	W	D	L	L	D	D	D	D	D	W	L	W	D	D	W	W	L	D	W	W	L	W	L	W
Position	1	2	3	3	3	3	3	2	2	2	2	3	2	2	1	1	3	3	3	3	4	4	4	3	5	4	5	5	4	4	5	5	5	5	5	5	5	4

Updated to match(es) played on 20 May 2018. Source: Competitive matches
A = Away; H = Home; W = Win; D = Draw; L = Loss

==== Matches ====
20 August 2017 1	Internazionale	3–0	Fiorentina	Milan
20:45 CEST (UTC+02:00)	Icardi 6' (pen.), 15'; Perišić 79'	Report	Sánchez (yellow card) 14'	Stadium: San Siro; Attendance: 51,752; Referee: Paolo Tagliavento

26 August 2017 2	Roma	1–3	Internazionale	Rome
20:45 CEST (UTC+02:00)	Džeko 15'; Juan Jesus (yellow card) 22'	Report	Candreva (yellow card) 19'; Icardi 67', 77'; Vecino 87'	Stadium: Stadio Olimpico; Attendance: 49,388; Referee: Massimiliano Irrati

10 September 2017 3	Internazionale	2–0	SPAL	Milan
12:30 CEST (UTC+02:00)	Icardi 27' (pen.); D'Ambrosio (yellow card) 30'; Gagliardini (yellow card) 58'; Perišić 87'	Report	Vicari (yellow card) 22'; Mora (yellow card) 45+3'	Stadium: San Siro; Attendance: 57,235; Referee: Claudio Gavillucci

16 September 2017 4	Crotone	0–2	Internazionale	Crotone
15:00 CEST (UTC+02:00)	Cordaz (yellow card) 83'	Report	Miranda (yellow card) 40'; Škriniar 82'; Candreva (yellow card) 90'; Perišić 90+2'	Stadium: Stadio Ezio Scida; Attendance: 13,422; Referee: Luca Banti

19 September 2017 5	Bologna	1–1	Internazionale	Bologna
20:45 CEST (UTC+02:00)	Poli (yellow card) 19'; Verdi 32'; Donsah (yellow card) 44'; Mirante (yellow card) 76'; Petković (yellow card) 77'	Report	D'Ambrosio (yellow card) 74'; Icardi 77' (pen.); Éder (yellow card) 86'; Nagatomo (yellow card) 90+1'	Stadium: Stadio Renato Dall'Ara; Attendance: 26,067; Referee: Marco Di Bello

24 September 2017 6	Internazionale	1–0	Genoa	Milan
15:00 CEST (UTC+02:00)	D'Ambrosio 87'	Report	Migliore (yellow card) 84'; Omeonga (red card) 90+1'; Zukanović (yellow card) 90+3'; Taarabt (red card) 90+3'	Stadium: San Siro; Attendance: 50,037; Referee: Marco Guida

1 October 2017 7	Benevento	1–2	Internazionale	Benevento
15:00 CEST (UTC+02:00)	D'Alessandro 42'; Costa (yellow card) 43'; Lombardi (yellow card) 64'	Report	Brozović 19', 22'; Valero (yellow card) 31'; Miranda (yellow card) 68'; Vecino (yellow card) 74'	Stadium: Stadio Ciro Vigorito; Attendance: 16,274; Referee: Daniele Doveri

15 October 2017 8	Internazionale	3–2	Milan	Milan
20:45 CEST (UTC+02:00)	Miranda (yellow card) 15'; Vecino (yellow card) 25'; Icardi 28', 63', 90' (pen.), (yellow card) 90+1'; Gagliardini (yellow card) 66'; Perišić (yellow card) 79'; Éder (yellow card) 90+4'	Report	Romagnoli (yellow card) 22'; Suso 56'; Handanović 81' (o.g.); Rodríguez (yellow card) 89'	Stadium: San Siro; Attendance: 78,328; Referee: Paolo Tagliavento

21 October 2017 9	Napoli	0–0	Internazionale	Naples
20:45 CEST (UTC+02:00)	Koulibaly (yellow card) 90+2'	Report	Miranda (yellow card) 66'	Stadium: Stadio San Paolo; Attendance: 49,762; Referee: Luca Banti

24 October 2017 10	Internazionale	3–2	Sampdoria	Milan
20:45 CEST (UTC+02:00)	Škriniar 18'; Icardi 32', 54'; Gagliardini (yellow card) 89'; Éder (yellow card) 90'	Report	Murru (yellow card) 61'; Kownacki 64'; Quagliarella 85', (yellow card) 86'	Stadium: San Siro; Attendance: 54,451; Referee: Marco Guida

30 October 2017 11	Hellas Verona	1–2	Internazionale	Verona
20:45 CET (UTC+01:00)	Fares (yellow card) 38'; Pazzini 59' (pen.), (yellow card) 89'; Heurtaux (yellow card) 90+4'; Lee Seung-woo (yellow card) 90+5'	Report	Valero 36'; Gagliardini (yellow card) 51'; Perišić 67'; Brozović (yellow card) 90+2'	Stadium: Stadio Marc'Antonio Bentegodi; Attendance: 26,948; Referee: Claudio Gavillucci

5 November 2017 12	Internazionale	1–1	Torino	Milan
12:30 CET (UTC+01:00)	Vecino (yellow card) 33'; Škriniar (yellow card) 66'; Éder 79'; Brozović (yellow card) 83'	Report	Burdisso (yellow card) 42'; Rincón (yellow card) 56'; Falque 59'; Sirigu (yellow card) 61'; Obi (yellow card) 64'; Acquah (yellow card) 89'	Stadium: San Siro; Attendance: 71,581; Referee: Daniele Orsato

19 November 2017 13	Internazionale	2–0	Atalanta	Milan
20:45 CET (UTC+01:00)	Icardi 51', 60'	Report	Palomino (yellow card) 48'; Kurtić (yellow card) 54'	Stadium: San Siro; Attendance: 52,177; Referee: Michael Fabbri

25 November 2017 14	Cagliari	1–3	Internazionale	Cagliari
20:45 CET (UTC+01:00)	Ceppitelli (yellow card) 66'; Pavoletti 71'; Giannetti (yellow card) 89'	Report	Miranda (yellow card) 13'; Icardi 29', 83'; Brozović 55'; Gagliardini (yellow card) 81'	Stadium: Sardegna Arena; Attendance: 15,974; Referee: Luca Pairetto

3 December 2017 15	Internazionale	5–0	Chievo	Milan
15:00 CET (UTC+01:00)	Perišić 23', 57', 90+2'; Icardi 38'; Ranocchia (yellow card) 56'; Škriniar 60'	Report		Stadium: San Siro; Attendance: 53,403; Referee: Gianpaolo Calvarese

9 December 2017 16	Juventus	0–0	Internazionale	Turin
20:45 CET (UTC+01:00)	Benatia (yellow card) 27'; Higuaín (yellow card) 39'	Report	Brozović (yellow card) 29'; Perišić (yellow card) 40'; Santon (yellow card) 61'; D'Ambrosio (yellow card) 88'; Vecino (yellow card) 90+1'	Stadium: Allianz Stadium; Attendance: 39,319; Referee: Paolo Valeri

16 December 2017 17	Internazionale	1–3	Udinese	Milan
15:00 CET (UTC+01:00)	Icardi 15'; Vecino (yellow card) 73'	Report	Lasagna 14'; Ali Adnan (yellow card) 28'; Nuytinck (yellow card) 43'; De Paul 61' (pen.); Fofana (yellow card) 66'; Widmer (yellow card) 74'; Barák 77'	Stadium: San Siro; Attendance: 52,011; Referee: Maurizio Mariani

23 December 2017 18	Sassuolo	1–0	Internazionale	Reggio Emilia
15:00 CET (UTC+01:00)	Falcinelli 34', (yellow card) 73'	Report	Brozović (yellow card) 21'; Cancelo (yellow card) 74'	Stadium: Mapei Stadium – Città del Tricolore; Attendance: 18,767; Referee: Daniele Doveri

30 December 2017 19	Internazionale	0–0	Lazio	Milan
18:00 CET (UTC+01:00)	Santon (yellow card) 67'; Vecino (yellow card) 72'	Report	Radu (yellow card) 78'	Stadium: San Siro; Attendance: 61,852; Referee: Gianluca Rocchi

5 January 2018 20	Fiorentina	1–1	Internazionale	Florence
20:45 CET (UTC+01:00)	Veretout (yellow card) 55'; Astori (yellow card) 87'; Simeone 90+1'	Report	Valero (yellow card) 11'; Ranocchia (yellow card) 28'; Icardi 55', (yellow card) 89'	Stadium: Stadio Artemio Franchi; Attendance: 29,428; Referee: Paolo Valeri

21 January 2018 21	Internazionale	1–1	Roma	Milan
20:45 CET (UTC+01:00)	Perišić (yellow card) 58'; Cancelo (yellow card) 68'; Vecino 86'	Report	El Shaarawy 31'	Stadium: San Siro; Attendance: 57,066; Referee: Davide Massa

28 January 2018 22	SPAL	1–1	Internazionale	Ferrara
12:30 CET (UTC+01:00)	Paloschi 90', (yellow card) 90+3'	Report	Vicari 48' (o.g.)	Stadium: Stadio Paolo Mazza; Attendance: 13,098; Referee: Piero Giacomelli

3 February 2018 23	Internazionale	1–1	Crotone	Milan
20:45 CET (UTC+01:00)	Éder 23', (yellow card) 59'	Report	Mandragora (yellow card) 29'; Barberis 60'; Benali (yellow card) 80'; Ricci (yellow card) 89'	Stadium: San Siro; Attendance: 46,807; Referee: Daniele Orsato

11 February 2018 24	Internazionale	2–1	Bologna	Milan
15:00 CET (UTC+01:00)	Éder 2'; Karamoh 63'; D'Ambrosio (yellow card) 80'	Report	Palacio (yellow card) 20', (goal) 25'; Mbaye (yellow card) 64' (yellow-red card) 68'; Masina (red card) 90+5'	Stadium: San Siro; Attendance: 46,915; Referee: Paolo Valeri

17 February 2018 25	Genoa	2–0	Internazionale	Genoa
20:45 CET (UTC+01:00)	Ranocchia 45' (o.g.); Pandev 59'	Report	Ranocchia (yellow card) 27'	Stadium: Stadio Luigi Ferraris; Attendance: 22,629; Referee: Michael Fabbri

24 February 2018 26	Internazionale	2–0	Benevento	Milan
20:45 CET (UTC+01:00)	Candreva (yellow card) 56'; Ranocchia (yellow card) 59', (goal) 69'; Škriniar 66'	Report	Viola (yellow card) 68' (yellow-red card) 81'; Del Pinto (yellow card) 90'	Stadium: San Siro; Attendance: 47,157; Referee: Luca Pairetto

11 March 2018 28	Internazionale	0–0	Napoli	Milan
20:45 CET (UTC+01:00)	Gagliardini (yellow card) 38'	Report	Allan (yellow card) 17'; Insigne (yellow card) 61'; Albiol (yellow card) 85'	Stadium: San Siro; Attendance: 65,000; Referee: Daniele Orsato

18 March 2018 29	Sampdoria	0–5	Internazionale	Genoa
12:30 CET (UTC+01:00)	Ramírez (yellow card) 37'; Caprari (yellow card) 53'	Report	Perišić 26'; Icardi 30' (pen.), 31', 44', 51'; Rafinha (yellow card) 77'	Stadium: Stadio Luigi Ferraris; Attendance: 21,336; Referee: Paolo Tagliavento

31 March 2018 30	Internazionale	3–0	Hellas Verona	Milan
15:00 CEST (UTC+02:00)	Icardi 1', 49'; Perišić 13'; Gagliardini (yellow card) 63'	Report	Büchel (yellow card) 5'; Fares (yellow card) 34'; Rômulo (yellow card) 77'; Nícolas (red card) 90'	Stadium: San Siro; Attendance: 60,230; Referee: Gianluca Rocchi

4 April 2018 27	Milan	0–0	Internazionale	Milan
18:30 CEST (UTC+02:00)	Suso (yellow card) 77'	Report	Cancelo (yellow card) 21'; Perišić (yellow card) 57'; Škriniar (yellow card) 58'; Candreva (yellow card) 71'	Stadium: San Siro; Attendance: 77,512; Referee: Marco Di Bello
Note: Postponed due to Fiorentina player Davide Astori's death; originally scheduled for 4 March 2018.

8 April 2018 31	Torino	1–0	Internazionale	Turin
12:30 CEST (UTC+02:00)	Belotti (yellow card) 21'; Ljajić 36'; Baselli (yellow card) 60'	Report	Miranda (yellow card) 7'; Brozović (yellow card) 39'; Gagliardini (yellow card) 45+2'	Stadium: Stadio Olimpico Grande Torino; Attendance: 25,507; Referee: Paolo Tagliavento

14 April 2018 32	Atalanta	0–0	Internazionale	Bergamo
20:45 CEST (UTC+02:00)	Toloi (yellow card) 37'; Caldara (yellow card) 62'; Masiello (yellow card) 82'; Mancini (yellow card) 90+1'	Report	Miranda (yellow card) 32'; Valero (yellow card) 55'	Stadium: Stadio Atleti Azzurri d'Italia; Attendance: 20,076; Referee: Daniele Doveri

17 April 2018 33	Internazionale	4–0	Cagliari	Milan
20:45 CEST (UTC+02:00)	Cancelo 3'; Icardi 49'; Brozović 60', (yellow card) 63'; Perišić 90'	Report	Giannetti (yellow card) 58'	Stadium: San Siro; Attendance: 47,467; Referee: Fabrizio Pasqua

22 April 2018 34	Chievo	1–2	Internazionale	Verona
15:00 CEST (UTC+02:00)	Pucciarelli (yellow card) 75'; Stępiński 90'	Report	Cancelo (yellow card) 45+1'; Icardi 52'; Perišić 61'	Stadium: Stadio Marc'Antonio Bentegodi; Attendance: 12,000; Referee: Paolo Valeri

28 April 2018 35	Internazionale	2–3	Juventus	Milan
20:45 CEST (UTC+02:00)	Vecino (red card) 15'; Icardi 52'; D'Ambrosio (yellow card) 58'; Barzagli 65' (o.g.); Brozović (yellow card) 88'	Report	Cuadrado (yellow card) 5'; Douglas Costa 13'; Pjanić (yellow card) 21'; Barzagli (yellow card) 45'; Mandžukić (yellow card) 52'; Alex Sandro (yellow card) 77'; Škriniar 87' (o.g.); Higuaín 89'	Stadium: San Siro; Attendance: 78,328; Referee: Daniele Orsato

6 May 2018 36	Udinese	0–4	Internazionale	Udine
12:30 CEST (UTC+02:00)	Danilo (yellow card) 34'; Fofana (red card) 49'	Report	Ranocchia 12'; Rafinha 43'; Icardi 45+1'; Valero 71'	Stadium: Dacia Arena; Attendance: 22,256; Referee: Paolo Mazzoleni

13 May 2018 37	Internazionale	1–2	Sassuolo	Milan
20:45 CEST (UTC+02:00)	Brozović (yellow card) 23'; Rafinha 80'	Report	Berardi (yellow card) 17', (goal) 72'; Politano 25'; Lemos (yellow card) 85'	Stadium: San Siro; Attendance: 66,876; Referee: Rosario Abisso

20 May 2018 38	Lazio	2–3	Internazionale	Rome
20:45 CEST (UTC+02:00)	Perišić 9' (o.g.); Luiz Felipe (yellow card) 26'; Lulić (yellow card) 34' (yellow-red card) 79'; Lucas (yellow card) 37'; Felipe Anderson 41'; Strakosha (yellow card) 63'; Patric (red card) 90+3'	Report	Brozović (yellow card) 13'; Miranda (yellow card) 23'; D'Ambrosio 29', (yellow card) 47'; Icardi 78' (pen.); Vecino 81', (yellow card) 83'	Stadium: Stadio Olimpico; Attendance: 68,000; Referee: Gianluca Rocchi
Note: Patric was sent off for dissent while a substitute.

=== Coppa Italia ===
12 December 2017 Round of 16	Internazionale	0–0 (a.e.t.) (5–4 p)	Pordenone	Milan
21:00 CET (UTC+01:00)		Report	Perilli (yellow card) 94'	Stadium: San Siro; Attendance: 25,956; Referee: Juan Luca Sacchi
	Penalties
	Brozović (penalty scored); Perišić (penalty scored); Škriniar (penalty missed); Gagliardini (penalty missed); Icardi (penalty scored); Vecino (penalty scored); Nagatomo (penalty scored)		(penalty missed) Misuraca; (penalty scored) Burrai; (penalty scored) Magnaghi; (penalty missed) Lulli; (penalty scored) Stefani; (penalty scored) Ciurria; (penalty missed) Parodi

27 December 2017 Quarter-finals	Milan	1–0 (a.e.t.)	Internazionale	Milan
20:45 CET (UTC+01:00)	Locatelli (yellow card) 16'; Biglia (yellow card) 20'; Cutrone 104', (yellow card) 104'	Report	Škriniar (yellow card) 72'; Vecino (yellow card) 111'; Valero (yellow card) 116'	Stadium: San Siro; Attendance: 48,721; Referee: Marco Guida

== Statistics ==
=== Appearances and goals ===
No.	Pos	Nat	Player	Total		Serie A		Coppa Italia	
No.	Pos	Nat	Player	Apps	Goals	Apps	Goals	Apps	Goals
Goalkeepers
1	GK	(Slovenia) SVN	Handanović	39	0	38	0	1	0
27	GK	(Italy) ITA	Padelli	1	0	0	0	1	0
Defenders
2	DF	(Argentina) ARG	López	1	0	0+1	0	0	0
7	DF	(Portugal) POR	Cancelo	28	1	20+6	1	2	0
13	DF	(Italy) ITA	Ranocchia	13	2	7+4	2	2	0
21	DF	(Italy) ITA	Santon	15	0	9+6	0	0	0
25	DF	(Brazil) BRA	Miranda	31	0	31	0	0	0
29	DF	(Brazil) BRA	Dalbert	14	0	5+8	0	1	0
33	DF	(Italy) ITA	Dambrosio	34	2	34	2	0	0
37	DF	(Slovakia) SVK	Škriniar	40	4	38	4	2	0
Midfielders
5	MF	(Italy) ITA	Gagliardini	32	0	23+7	0	2	0
8	MF	(Brazil) BRA	Rafinha	17	2	12+5	2	0	0
11	MF	(Uruguay) URU	Vecino	31	3	25+4	3	2	0
20	MF	(Spain) ESP	Valero	37	2	29+7	2	0+1	0
44	MF	(Croatia) CRO	Perišić	39	11	37	11	1+1	0
63	MF	(Belgium) BEL	Emmers	0	0	0	0	0	0
77	MF	(Croatia) CRO	Brozović	33	4	21+10	4	0+2	0
87	MF	(Italy) ITA	Candreva	37	0	33+3	0	1	0
Forwards
9	FW	(Argentina) ARG	Icardi	36	29	34	29	1+1	0
17	FW	(France) FRA	Karamoh	17	1	4+12	1	1	0
23	FW	(Italy) ITA	Éder	31	3	4+25	3	1+1	0
99	FW	(Italy) ITA	Pinamonti	2	0	0+1	0	1	0
Players transferred out during the season
10	MF	(Portugal) POR	João Mário	15	0	5+9	0	1	0
55	DF	(Japan) JPN	Nagatomo	13	0	9+2	0	2	0

Last updated: 20 May 2018
Source: Competitions

=== Goalscorers ===
Rank	No.	Pos	Nat	Name	Serie A	Coppa Italia	Total
1	9	FW	(Argentina)	Mauro Icardi	29	0	29
2	44	MF	(Croatia)	Ivan Perišić	11	0	11
3	37	DF	(Slovakia)	Milan Škriniar	4	0	4
3	77	MF	(Croatia)	Marcelo Brozović	4	0	4
5	11	MF	(Uruguay)	Matías Vecino	3	0	3
5	23	FW	(Italy)	Éder	3	0	3
7	8	MF	(Brazil)	Rafinha	2	0	2
7	13	DF	(Italy)	Andrea Ranocchia	2	0	2
7	20	MF	(Spain)	Borja Valero	2	0	2
7	33	DF	(Italy)	Danilo D'Ambrosio	2	0	2
11	7	DF	(Portugal)	João Cancelo	1	0	1
11	17	FW	(France)	Yann Karamoh	1	0	1
Own goal					2	0	2
Totals					66	0	66

Last updated: 20 May 2018

=== Clean sheets ===
Rank	No.	Pos	Nat	Name	Serie A	Coppa Italia	Total
1	1	GK	(Slovenia)	Samir Handanović	17	0	17
2	27	GK	(Italy)	Daniele Padelli	0	1	1
Totals					17	1	18

Last updated: 20 May 2018

=== Disciplinary record ===
No.	Pos	Nat	Name	Serie A			Coppa Italia			Total		
No.	Pos	Nat	Name	Booked	(yellow card) (yellow-red card)	Sent off (straight red)	Booked	(yellow card) (yellow-red card)	Sent off (straight red)	Booked	(yellow card) (yellow-red card)	Sent off (straight red)
7	DF	(Portugal)	João Cancelo	4	0	0	0	0	0	4	0	0
13	DF	(Italy)	Andrea Ranocchia	4	0	0	0	0	0	4	0	0
21	DF	(Italy)	Davide Santon	2	0	0	0	0	0	2	0	0
25	DF	(Brazil)	Miranda	8	0	0	0	0	0	8	0	0
33	DF	(Italy)	Danilo D'Ambrosio	6	0	0	0	0	0	6	0	0
37	DF	(Slovakia)	Milan Škriniar	2	0	0	1	0	0	3	0	0
55	DF	(Japan)	Yuto Nagatomo	1	0	0	0	0	0	1	0	0
5	MF	(Italy)	Roberto Gagliardini	8	0	0	0	0	0	8	0	0
8	MF	(Brazil)	Rafinha	1	0	0	0	0	0	1	0	0
11	MF	(Uruguay)	Matías Vecino	7	0	1	1	0	0	8	0	1
20	MF	(Spain)	Borja Valero	3	0	0	1	0	0	4	0	0
44	MF	(Croatia)	Ivan Perišić	4	0	0	0	0	0	4	0	0
77	MF	(Croatia)	Marcelo Brozović	9	0	0	0	0	0	9	0	0
87	MF	(Italy)	Antonio Candreva	4	0	0	0	0	0	4	0	0
9	FW	(Argentina)	Mauro Icardi	2	0	0	0	0	0	2	0	0
23	FW	(Italy)	Éder	4	0	0	0	0	0	4	0	0
Totals				69	0	1	3	0	0	72	0	1

Last updated: 20 May 2018
