= Emmer (disambiguation) =

Emmer is a low-yielding, awned wheat.

Emmer may also refer to:

== People ==
=== People with the surname ===
- Frank Emmer (1896 - 1963), an American baseball player and the shortstop for the Cincinnati Reds
- Huib Emmer (born 1951), a Dutch composer
- Jack Emmer, U.S. player of American football and lacrosse coach
- Luciano Emmer (1918 – 2009), an Italian film director
- Piet Emmer (born 1944), Dutch professor of history
- Stephen Emmer (born 1958), Dutch musician
- Tom Emmer (born 1961), a United States Representative from Minnesota
- Wallace N. Emmer (1917–1945), U.S. air ace

=== People with the given name ===
- Emmer Bowen (1830–1912), Medal of Honor recipient for action during the American Civil War for the Union
- Emmer Sewell (born 1934), U.S. artist

== Places ==
- Emmer (Weser), a river of Lower Saxony and North Rhine-Westphalia, Germany
- Emmer Green, a suburb of Reading, England, UK
  - Emmer Green (Reading ward)
- Joe Emmer House, White County, Arkansas, USA; an NRHP-listed house

== See also ==
- Emmers
- Emer
- Ehmer
- Eimer (disambiguation)
