= Eimer =

Eimer is a given name and a surname. It may be a spelling of the Gaelic name Emer. Notable people with the surname include:

== Surname ==
- Christoph Eimer (born 1977), German field hockey player
- David Eimer, British journalist
- Martin Eimer, British psychology professor
- Norbert Eimer (1940–2021), German politician
- Theodor Eimer (1843–1898), German zoologist

== Given name ==
- Eimer Ní Mhaoldomhnaigh, Irish costume designer

== See also ==
- Nancy Eimers (born 1954), U.S. poet
- Eimer's organ, a sensory organ formed from the epidermis, isolated by and named after Theodor Eimer
- Emmer (disambiguation)
- Eimert
- Ehmer
