= Emmers =

Emmers is a surname. Notable people with the surname include:

- Jamall Emmers (born 1989), U.S. mixed martial artist
- Marc Emmers (born 1966), Belgian footballer
- Xian Emmers (born 1999), Belgian footballer

== See also ==
- Emmerson (disambiguation)
- Emmer (disambiguation)
- Eimer (disambiguation)
- Ehmer
- Emer
