= Éder (footballer, born 1986) =

Italy international footballer

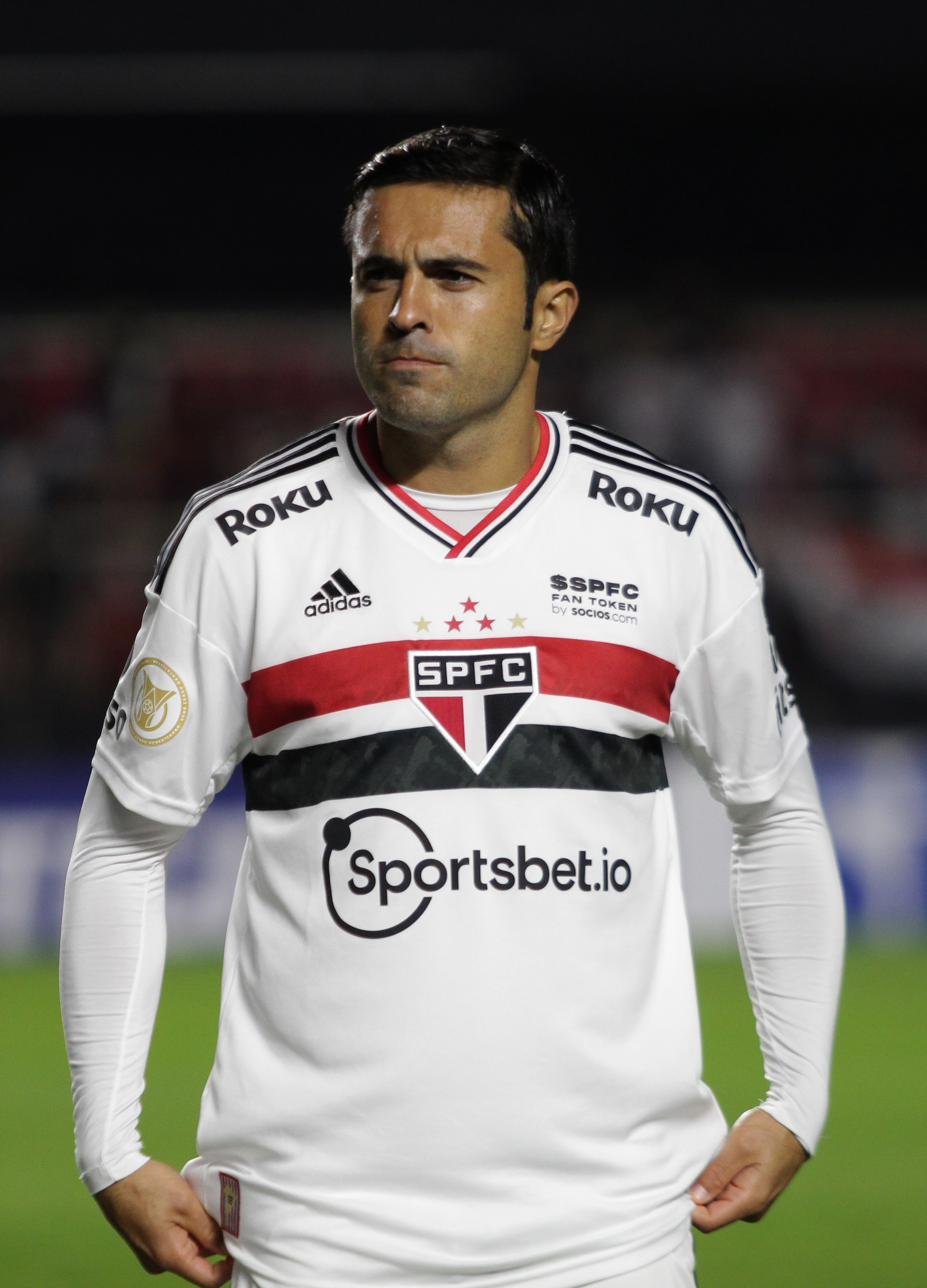
- Éder with São Paulo in 2022

Personal information
- Full name: Éder Citadin Martins
- Date of birth: 15 November 1986 (age 40)
- Place of birth: Lauro Müller, Brazil
- Height: 1.79 m (5 ft 10 in)
- Position: Forward

Youth career
- 2003–2005: Criciúma

Senior career*
Years	Team	Apps	(Gls)
2004–2005	Criciúma	30	(8)
2006–2007	Empoli	5	(0)
2008–2009	Frosinone	52	(20)
2009–2012	Empoli	40	(27)
2010–2011	→ Brescia (loan)	35	(6)
2011–2012	→ Cesena (loan)	17	(2)
2012	→ Sampdoria (loan)	19	(5)
2012–2016	Sampdoria	112	(40)
2016	→ Inter Milan (loan)	14	(1)
2016–2018	Inter Milan	62	(11)
2018–2020	Jiangsu Suning	60	(32)
2021–2022	São Paulo	59	(6)
2023–2024	Criciúma	61	(12)
Total		565	(169)

International career
2015–2017	Italy	26	(6)
- * Club domestic league appearances and goals

Éder Citadin Martins (born 15 November 1986), simply known as Éder (Brazilian Portuguese: [ˈɛdɛʁ]; Italian pronunciation: [ˈɛːder]), is a former professional footballer who played as a forward.

Born in Brazil with Italian ancestry, Éder moved to Italy at age 19, where he spent most of his professional career (from 2006 to 2018). He began his career with Brazilian club Criciúma, and moved to Italian club Empoli in January 2006, spending most of his career in the country for clubs such as Empoli, Sampdoria and Inter Milan. In 2018, he moved to China, joining Inter Milan's sister club Jiangsu Suning. Following the club's dissolution in 2021, he returned to Brazil, joining São Paulo.

Éder was born in Brazil, but qualifies to play for Italy through his Italian passport and more than two-years of residency in Italy. He made his international debut for Italy in March 2015, and scored two goals in their successful qualification campaign for UEFA Euro 2016, also being selected for the final tournament.

== Early life ==
Éder holds dual nationality (Brazilian and Italian) as his great-grandfather, Battista Righetto, was from Nove in the Province of Vicenza. He was named in tribute to Éder Aleixo de Assis, striker of the Brazil national team during the 1982 FIFA World Cup.

== Club career ==
=== Early years ===
Born in Lauro Müller, Santa Catarina state, Éder started his career at Criciúma. He made his first team – and Campeonato Brasileiro Série A – debut on 19 December 2004, coming on as a second-half substitute in a 3–3 home draw against Coritiba, with his side being already relegated.

Éder was definitely promoted to the first team ahead of the 2005 season, and scored his first goal on 30 January of that year, but in a 3–2 Campeonato Catarinense home loss against Joinville. He finished the tournament with three goals in ten appearances, and scored in his Campeonato Brasileiro Série B debut against São Raimundo-AM on 26 April, finishing a 2–0 home success.

At the age of 19, and with five goals in 19 league appearances during the year, Éder was signed by Italian club Empoli.

=== Frosinone ===
Éder signed with Frosinone in a co-ownership deal for a fee of €600,000 in June 2008 following a loan spell during the second half of the 2007–08 Serie B season.

=== Return to Empoli ===
Empoli bought Éder back from Frosinone in June 2009 for €2.42 million following an impressive Serie B season by the striker. He scored four goals in one Serie B game on 13 April 2010, two of which were penalties, in a 5–2 victory for Empoli over Salernitana. He finished the 2009–10 Serie B season as top scorer, with 27 goals.

==== Loans to Brescia & Cesena ====
On 20 August 2010, Éder signed a 1+4 year contract with Serie A newcomers Brescia, meaning that Éder would join Brescia on loan for the first year. Brescia later revealed in its financial report that the loan fee was €1.8 million.

Éder scored just six goals for the club and on 13 July 2011 was transferred to Cesena from Empoli in a temporary deal for €2.2 million (which later compensate by the loan fee from Sampdoria).

=== Sampdoria ===
On 24 January 2012, Éder moved to Sampdoria on a loan deal for €1.1 million fee to Cesena. He scored his first goal for the club on 21 April 2012 in a 1–1 draw with Vicenza. On 3 July 2012, Sampdoria signed Éder outright for €3 million on a five-year contract from Empoli, making Eder had cost Sampdoria €4.1 million in total, while on Empoli side, the club received €7 million fee from 2010 to 2012.

=== Internazionale ===
On 29 January 2016, Éder joined Inter on a 1½-year loan deal for €1.2 million which could be made permanent upon the fulfillment of certain conditions. He signed a contract that could keep him at Inter until 2020, and is receiving a wage of reported €1.5 million per year. He was presented to the media on the very same day, where he was assigned the number 23, saying that he did not think twice about signing with Inter. He made his debut for the club on 31 January, in a 3–0 defeat to cross-city rivals Milan in the Derby della Madonnina.

After making his first friendly appearance for Inter of the 2016–17 season on 14 August, the obligation to purchase him in a definitive deal was activated. On 28 January of the following year, Éder celebrated his 200th Serie A appearance by scoring in a 3–0 home win over Pescara. On 14 May 2017, Éder came off the bench to scoring his team's only goal in the 1–2 home defeat to Sassuolo, before profiting from Mauro Icardi's injury to start in the last two league matches, scoring against Lazio and a brace against Udinese, taking his tally up to eight league goals. It was also the first time that Éder had scored in three Serie A matches in a row as an Inter player, and first time since November 2015. He finished his first full season with Inter by making 40 appearances in all competitions, including 33 in Serie A and six in Europa League, scoring ten goals in the process, eight of which came in Serie A and two in the Europa League.

On 2 November 2017, Éder signed a contract extension, penning a new deal until June 2021. Only three days later, he came off the bench to score his first 2017–18 season goal in the 1–1 draw against Torino to help Inter remain undefeated. Éder made his first starts of the 2017–18 season later in February 2018, profiting from Icardi's injury; the first was in the 1–1 draw versus Crotone where he netted a header in the first half and the second was versus Bologna where he scored inside 90 seconds to lead Inter into a 2–1 home win, the first after eight league matches.

=== Jiangsu Suning ===
On 13 July 2018, Éder signed with Chinese club Jiangsu Suning for a reported €5.5 million.

On 12 November 2020, Éder scored in the second-leg of the Chinese Super League finals against Guangzhou Evergrande. Jiangsu Suning won the match 2–1, with an aggregate victory of the same scoreline, securing the club's first league title in their history.

=== São Paulo ===
On 26 March 2021, Éder joined São Paulo on a deal running until December 2022.

=== Return To Criciúma ===
On 13 January 2023, Éder Rejoined his first professional club Criciúma. He would go on to make 35 appearances and score 10 goals in all competitions. On 5 August 2024, Éder retired from football.

== International career ==
Éder, as a dual citizen of Italy and Brazil, was eligible to play for both nations. He qualified for the Italy national team through his Italian citizenship as well as more than 2-year of residence in Italy; he qualified to Italian citizenship through his Italian great-grandfather Battista Righetto, who came from Nove in Veneto.

He was previously included in Brazil's preliminary squad for the 2008 Summer Olympics, however, he did not get a place in the final squad list by coach Dunga.

Éder began to be considered for the Italy national team by head coach Antonio Conte due to his good form in the 2014–15 season with Sampdoria.

There was controversy surrounding Antonio Conte's call-up for Éder and Franco Vázquez, respectively born in Brazil and Argentina. Speaking at a Serie A meeting on 23 March 2015, Inter manager Roberto Mancini stated, "The Italian national team should be Italian. An Italian player deserves to play for the national team while someone who wasn't born in Italy, even if they have relatives, I don't think they deserve to." Conte's response to the use of overseas-born players was: "If Mauro Camoranesi [who was born in Argentina] was allowed to help Italy win the 2006 FIFA World Cup, then why can't Éder and Franco Vázquez lead the Azzurri to glory in next year's European Championship?"

On 28 March 2015, Éder made his debut for Italy, coming on as a 58th-minute substitute for Simone Zaza in a UEFA Euro 2016 qualifier against Bulgaria and scoring the equaliser in a 2–2 draw in the 84th minute. He made his first start three days later against England in a 1–1 draw in Turin, making way for fellow oriundo Vázquez after 61 minutes. On 10 October 2015, Éder opened the scoring in a 3–1 away win over Azerbaijan, which sealed Italy's qualification for UEFA Euro 2016. On 31 May 2016, he was named to Conte's 23-man Italy squad for Euro 2016. On 17 June, he scored the only goal against Sweden in the 88th minute during the second group game, which qualified Italy to the Round of 16; he was named Man of the Match by UEFA.

== Style of play ==
Éder is a forward, who usually plays in a central role as a main striker, due to his pace, positional sense, attacking movement, tactical intelligence, and eye for goal, which make him particularly effective during counter-attacks. A versatile, hard-working, and technically gifted player, with good vision, he is also effective as a second striker, as a left winger, or even as an attacking midfielder, positions which allow him to provide depth to his team and participate in build-up plays, play off of his teammates, hold up the ball, and provide assists. Possessing substantial physical strength, despite his relatively small stature, he can also be effective in the air, as well as from set-pieces and penalties. In addition to his offensive and creative abilities, Éder has stamina and defensive work-rate, which make him useful when his team are not in possession.

== Career statistics ==
=== Club ===
As of match played 4 August 2024

Appearances and goals by club, season and competition
Club	Season	League			State league (Note: Includes Campeonato Catarinense, Campeonato Paulista)		National cup (Note: Includes Copa do Brasil, Coppa Italia, Chinese FA Cup)		Continental		Other		Total	
Club	Season	Division	Apps	Goals	Apps	Goals	Apps	Goals	Apps	Goals	Apps	Goals	Apps	Goals
Criciúma	2004	Série A	1	0	0	0	0	0	—		—		1	0
Criciúma	2005	Série B	19	5	10	3	0	0	—		—		29	8
Criciúma	Total		20	5	10	3	0	0	—		—		30	8
Empoli	2005–06	Serie A	0	0	—		0	0	—		—		0	0
Empoli	2006–07	Serie A	5	0	—		4	0	—		—		9	0
Empoli	2007–08	Serie A	0	0	—		0	0	1 (Note: Appearance in UEFA Cup)	0	—		1	0
Empoli	Total		5	0	—		4	0	1	0	—		10	0
Frosinone	2007–08	Serie B	19	6	—		—		—		—		19	6
Frosinone	2008–09	Serie B	33	14	—		1	0	—		—		34	14
Frosinone	Total		52	20	—		1	0	—		—		53	20
Empoli	2009–10	Serie B	40	27	—		2	0	—		—		41	27
Brescia	2010–11	Serie A	35	6	—		1	0	—		—		36	6
Cesena	2011–12	Serie A	17	2	—		2	0	—		—		19	2
Sampdoria	2011–12	Serie B	19	5	—		—		—		—		19	5
Sampdoria	2012–13	Serie A	30	7	—		0	0	—		—		30	7
Sampdoria	2013–14	Serie A	33	12	—		1	0	—		—		34	12
Sampdoria	2014–15	Serie A	30	9	—		1	3	—		—		31	12
Sampdoria	2015–16	Serie A	19	12	—		0	0	2 (Note: Appearances in UEFA Europa League)	1	—		21	13
Sampdoria	Total		131	45	—		2	3	2	1	—		135	49
Inter Milan	2015–16	Serie A	14	1	—		1	0	—		—		15	1
Inter Milan	2016–17	Serie A	33	8	—		1	0	6	2	—		40	10
Inter Milan	2017–18	Serie A	29	3	—		2	0	—		—		31	3
Inter Milan	Total		76	12	—		4	0	6	2	—		86	14
Jiangsu Suning	2018	Chinese Super League	16	11	—		0	0	—		—		16	11
Jiangsu Suning	2019	Chinese Super League	24	12	—		1	0	—		—		25	12
Jiangsu Suning	2020	Chinese Super League	20	9	—		1	0	—		—		21	9
Jiangsu Suning	Total		60	32	—		2	0	—		—		62	32
São Paulo	2021	Série A	17	1	4	1	2	2	5 (Note: Appearances in Copa Libertadores)	1	—		28	5
São Paulo	2022	Série A	24	3	14	1	3	1	5 (Note: Appearances in Copa Sudamericana)	1	—		46	6
São Paulo	Total		41	4	18	2	5	3	10	2	—		74	11
Criciúma	2023	Série B	26	9	9	1	1	1	—		—		36	11
Criciúma	2024	Série A	16	0	10	2	3	1	—		1 (Note: Appearance in Recopa Catarinense)	1	30	4
Criciúma	Total		42	9	19	3	4	2	—		1	1	66	15
Career total			518	161	47	8	27	8	19	5	1	1	611	184

=== International ===
Appearances and goals by national team and year
National team	Year	Apps	Goals
Italy
Italy	2015	8	2
Italy	2016	12	1
Italy	2017	6	3
Total		26	6

Italy score listed first, score column indicates score after each Éder goal.

International goals by date, venue, cap, opponent, score, result and competition
No.	Date	Venue	Cap	Opponent	Score	Result	Competition
1	28 March 2015	Vasil Levski National Stadium, Sofia, Bulgaria	1	Bulgaria	2–2	2–2	UEFA Euro 2016 qualifying
2	10 October 2015	Baku National Stadium, Baku, Azerbaijan	5	Azerbaijan	1–0	3–1	UEFA Euro 2016 qualifying
3	17 June 2016	Stadium Municipal, Toulouse, France	12	Sweden	1–0	1–0	UEFA Euro 2016
4	28 March 2017	Amsterdam Arena, Amsterdam, Netherlands	21	Netherlands	1–0	2–1	Friendly
5	7 June 2017	Allianz Riviera Stadium, Nice, France	22	Uruguay	2–0	3–0	Friendly
6	11 June 2017	Stadio Friuli, Udine, Italy	23	Liechtenstein	3–0	5–0	2018 FIFA World Cup qualification

== Honours ==
Jiangsu Suning

- Chinese Super League: 2020

São Paulo

- Campeonato Paulista: 2021

Criciúma

- Campeonato Catarinense: 2023
- Recopa Catarinense: 2024

Individual

- Serie B top scorer: 2009–10 (27 goals)
