= Nagatomo =

Nagatomo (written: 長友) is a Japanese surname. Notable people with the surname include:

- Tatsuya Nagatomo (長友 達也, born 1953), Japanese actor and voice actor
- Tomoko Nagatomo (born 1972), Japanese archaeologist
- Yasuo Nagatomo (長友 寧雄, born 1951), Japanese sport wrestler
- Yuto Nagatomo (長友 佑都, born 1986), Japanese footballer

Nagatomo (written: 長友) is also a masculine Japanese given name. Notable people with the name include:

- Asano Nagatomo (浅野 長友) (1643–1675), Japanese daimyō

== See also ==
- 8932 Nagatomo, a main-belt asteroid
