= Ivan Perišić =

Croatian footballer (born 1989)

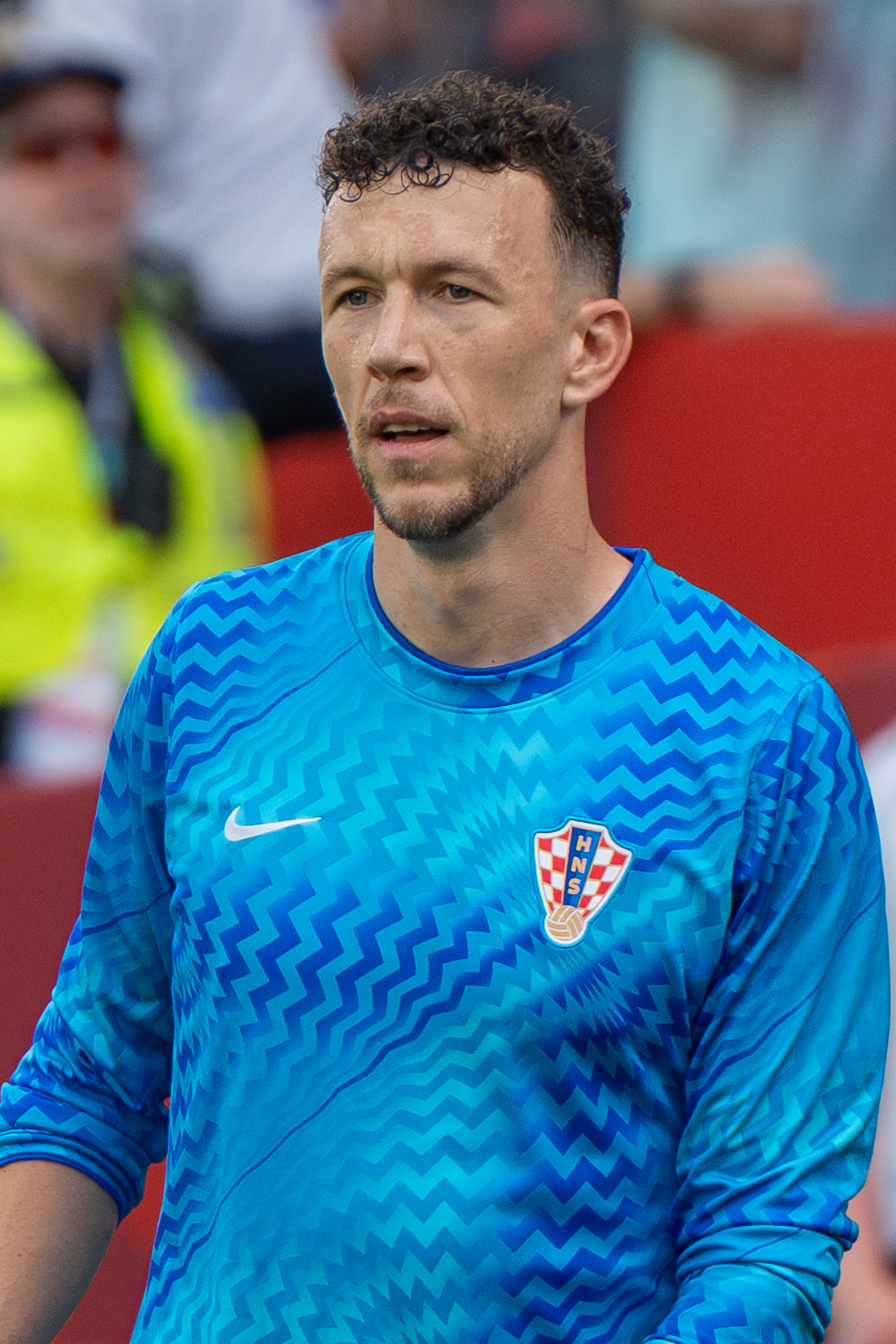
- Perišić with Croatia in 2026

Personal information
- Full name: Ivan Perišić
- Date of birth: 2 February 1989 (age 37)
- Place of birth: Split, SR Croatia, Yugoslavia
- Height: 1.86 m (6 ft 1 in)
- Position: Left winger

Team information
- Current team: PSV
- Number: 5

Youth career
- 1998–2000: NK Dalmatinac Split
- 2000–2006: Hajduk Split

Senior career*
Years	Team	Apps	(Gls)
2006–2009	Sochaux II	36	(8)
2009	→ Roeselare (loan)	17	(5)
2009–2011	Club Brugge	70	(31)
2011–2013	Borussia Dortmund	42	(9)
2013–2015	VfL Wolfsburg	70	(18)
2015–2022	Inter Milan	208	(49)
2019–2020	→ Bayern Munich (loan)	22	(4)
2022–2024	Tottenham Hotspur	39	(1)
2024	→ Hajduk Split (loan)	7	(1)
2024	Hajduk Split	1	(0)
2024–	PSV	67	(18)

International career^{‡}
2005	Croatia U17	7	(0)
2007	Croatia U19	2	(0)
2009–2010	Croatia U21	8	(3)
2011–	Croatia	163	(41)
Medal record
Representing Croatia
FIFA World Cup
Second place	2018 Russia
Third place	2022 Qatar
UEFA Nations League
Second place	2023 Netherlands
- * Club domestic league appearances and goals as of 20:44, 31 October 2026 (UTC) ‡ National team caps and goals as of 23:08, 15 November 2026 (UTC)

Ivan Perišić (Croatian pronunciation: [ǐʋan pěriʃitɕ]; born 2 February 1989) is a Croatian professional footballer who plays as a left winger for Eredivisie club PSV and the Croatia national team. Known for his ambipedality and versatility on the field, he is widely regarded as one of the greatest Croatian players of all time.

A product of the Hajduk Split and Sochaux-Montbéliard youth academies, Perišić began his career at Club Brugge, where he was the Belgian Pro League top goalscorer and was named Belgian Footballer of the Year for 2011. This earned him a transfer to Borussia Dortmund, with whom he won the 2011–12 Bundesliga, before signing with VfL Wolfsburg for €8 million in 2013. He remained there for two and a half seasons, winning the 2015 DFB-Pokal final, before moving to Inter Milan for €16 million. In 2019, he joined Bayern Munich on loan, winning the treble. After returning to Inter Milan, he won the 2020–21 Serie A, the 2021 Supercoppa Italiana and the 2021–22 Coppa Italia.

A former youth international across numerous levels, Perišić made his debut for Croatia in 2011 and went on to represent his nation at four UEFA European Championships (in 2012, 2016, 2020 and 2024) as well as four FIFA World Cups (in 2014, 2018, 2022 and 2026). He helped lead Croatia to a second and third-place finish at the 2018 and 2022 World Cups, securing two medals, as well as a second-place finish in the 2023 UEFA Nations League. Instrumental to Croatia's second "golden generation", Perišić is his nation's top scorer at World Cup tournaments.

== Club career ==
=== Early career ===
Perišić played in the youth ranks of the club he grew up supporting, Hajduk Split. He received interest from a number of clubs, including Anderlecht, PSV, Ajax, Hertha BSC and Hamburger SV. The only match he played for Hajduk was a friendly 3–1 win over Smederevo in Murska Sobota on 16 July 2006. Returning from Murska Sobota to Split, Perišić received offers from Anderlecht and Sochaux. Hajduk offered Perišić a €100,000 contract, which was only €20,000 less than Hajduk's best player Niko Kranjčar's contract. However, the Perišić family opted for French club Sochaux, which paid €360,000 to sign him in the summer of 2006. Sochaux's coach Alain Perrin personally arrived to Split with a private jet to convince Perišić to sign, waiting two days for his signature. His physical and technical attributes led to comparisons to former Croatia international Aljoša Asanović by some journalists. He was a member of the Sochaux youth team, which won the Coupe Gambardella in 2007. During his time at Sochaux, he failed to make a first-team appearance, but did play for the B team. In January 2009, Perišić was sent on loan to Belgian top flight club Roeselare for six months. At the end of the 2008–09 season, there were reports Perišić sought to join Belgian side Anderlecht.

=== Club Brugge ===
On 26 August 2009, Belgian club Club Brugge acquired Perišić from Sochaux for a €250,000 transfer fee and signed him to a three-year contract. Prior his move, Perišić was linked with a move to German side Hertha BSC, having gone on trial.

In the opening match of the season, Perišić scored his first goal in a 1–1 draw against Genk, then scored his second in two consecutive games and provided assists in a 4–1 win over Westerlo. Overall, Perišić scored 9 goals in 33 league appearances, also making eight appearances in Brugge's Europa League campaign, scoring four goals. At the end of the season, Perišić signed a new three-year contract at Brugge, keeping him until 2015.

Belgian football critics predicted a bright future for Perišić. In the 2010–11 season, he was the top scorer of the Belgian Jupiler Pro League after scoring 22 goals for Club Brugge, also being named Player of the Year in Belgium. During the season, Perišić scored four goals and provided an assist in a 5–0 win against Charleroi on 29 December 2010.

=== Borussia Dortmund ===
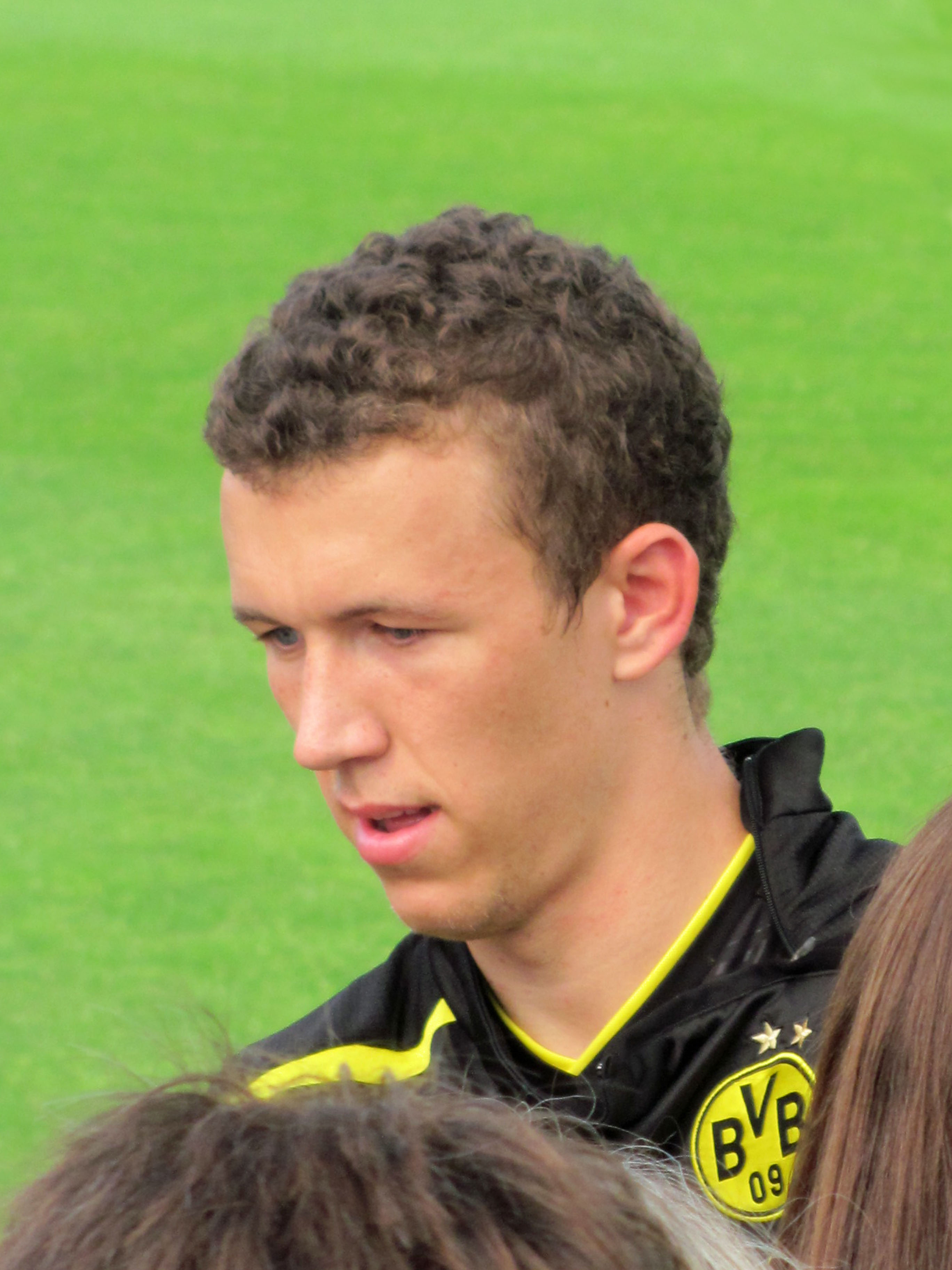
Perišić with Borussia Dortmund in 2012

On 23 May 2011, Perišić signed a five-year contract to play for German side Borussia Dortmund after Dortmund paid an estimated €5 million transfer fee to Brugge. He made his debut for the club in their 3–1 home victory over Hamburger SV on 5 August, substituting on for Chris Löwe in the 75th minute. During a Champions League match on 13 September 2011, he scored a late equaliser with a volley from 20 yards against Arsenal after entering as a substitute in the 69th minute. On 14 October, he scored the first goal in a 2–0 win against Werder Bremen, a match in which he was later sent off for a second bookable offence. On 21 April 2012, he scored the important 1–0 goal against Borussia Mönchengladbach and opened the door to the eighth national championship for Dortmund. The game ended 2–0 (the second was scored by Shinji Kagawa).

Perišić began the 2012–13 Bundesliga season scoring a brace in a 3–2 loss against Hamburger SV on 22 September 2012. However, Perišić soon found his first team opportunities limited, having played less in the first team and soon told Croatian channel Nova TV he had received no support from Dortmund manager Jürgen Klopp and accused him of favouring other players. In response, Klopp criticised his actions as childish and Perišić faced a fine due to his comment.

=== VfL Wolfsburg ===
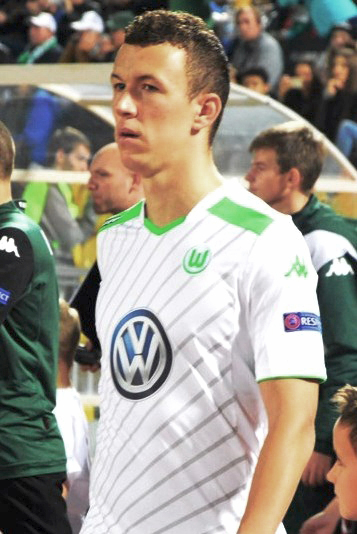
Perišić with VfL Wolfsburg in 2014

On 6 January 2013, it was reported Perišić transferred for €8 million to VfL Wolfsburg. He scored his first goal for Wolfsburg in a friendly match against Standard Liège on 10 January. He made his competitive debut for Wolfsburg against VfB Stuttgart on 19 January 2013. In March, he suffered a left knee injury that sidelined him throughout March and April. He made his comeback in May in the match against Hamburger SV, coming on as a substitute and providing an assist. On 11 May 2013, he faced his former club Borussia Dortmund, scoring two goals.

On 3 August 2013, Perišić scored his first cup goal for Wolfsburg in their 3–1 win against Karlsruher SC. On 26 October 2013, Perišić opened his goal scoring form in the 2013–14 season in their 3–0 win against Werder Bremen, also creating an assist on a goal. On matchday 30, he scored a brace in Wolfsburg's 4–1 home win against 1. FC Nürnberg. Perišić finished the season with ten league goals, second-best on the team behind fellow countryman Ivica Olić.

=== Inter Milan ===
On 30 August 2015, Perišić signed with Italian club Inter Milan on a five-year contract for a transfer fee of €16 million. He was presented on 10 September alongside Adem Ljajić, where he was assigned squad number 44, stating, "Inter were too big an opportunity to turn down."

==== 2015–16 season ====
Perišić made his competitive debut for the club three days after signing, starting and playing 85 minutes in a 1–0 win against cross-city rivals Milan in the Derby della Madonnina. He opened his scoring account on 4 October in his fifth league appearance in the 1–1 away draw against Sampdoria, profiting from Mauro Icardi's assist, which was followed by another goal against Palermo two weeks later.

On 15 December, Perišić made his Coppa Italia debut in the round of 16 match against Cagliari at home, appearing as a second-half substitute and scoring the team's third goal of the match in an eventual 3–0 win. He began 2016 on 6 January in the match away against Empoli; his cross from close range was finished home by Icardi for the only goal of the match, which kept Inter top to the table. On 7 February, during the match against Hellas Verona, Perišić came on as a 46th-minute substitute to change the fate of the match, providing an assist for Icardi and also scoring for himself to level the result 3–3, rescuing a point for his side.

March was Perišić's best month in personal terms, scoring four goals and providing three assists. On 2 March, in the returning leg of Coppa Italia's semi-final against Juventus at San Siro, Perišić scored the team's second goal of the match to help Inter overturn the 3–0 defeat and equal the aggregate 3–3, which led the match into the penalty shoot-outs. However, Inter lost 5–3 and were eliminated from the competition. Perišić scored Inter's last goal of 2015–16 season in a 2–1 home win against Empoli on the final matchday.

Perišić finished his first season with Inter Milan by playing 37 matches, including 34 in league, scoring nine goals, seven of them in league, and Inter Milan finished fourth in Serie A, returning in European competitions after a one-year absence and was eliminated in the semi-final in the Coppa Italia. He was also Inter Milan's top assist provider with six assists.

==== 2016–17 season ====
Perišić opened his second Inter season by playing in the last 30 minutes of the first matchday as fell away at Chievo. He then scored his first goal of the new season in the Derby d'Italia against Juventus at home, entering in the 69th minute and heading home an Mauro Icardi cross nine minutes later to give Inter second win of the season, also the first in league against Juventus since November 2012.

Perišić played his first European match for Inter Milan on 29 September in team's second 2016–17 UEFA Europa League group stage match against Sparta Prague, appearing in the last 27 minutes of a 3–1 away defeat. On 20 November, in the Derby against rivals Milan, he first provided the Antonio Candreva's long-range strike before scoring himself a last minute equaliser, as Inter took one point in the last moments.

On 8 January 2017, Inter Milan's first match of the calendar year, Perišić provided a Man of the Match performance by scoring both goals in a 2–1 away win at Udinese; it was his first Inter brace which took his tally up to six goals. This was followed by another splendid individual performance against Chievo six days later as he scored his team's second goal after an individual effort in an eventual 3–1 win.

On 5 February, in the matchday 23 against Juventus at Juventus Stadium, Perišić received his first-ever career red card as Inter Milan were defeated 1–0. He was subsequently banned for two matches by Italian Football Federation (FIGC) for aggressive confrontation of the referee. After Inter Milan appealed the suspension, it was reduced to one match. He returned from suspension on 19 February in the 1–0 win at Bologna, and scored his second brace on 5 March in a 5–1 thrashing of Cagliari at Stadio Sant'Elia.

On 22 April, Perišić reached double-figures for the first time with Inter Milan after scoring in a 5–4 away defeat against Fiorentina. On the final matchday, he provided a stunning individual performance by providing two assists after individual efforts, also scoring his 11th goal of the season as Inter thrashed Udinese 5–2 at home end the season on a high. Perišić finished his second Inter season by making 42 appearances in all competitions, including 36 in league, which 31 were as starter, as Inter finished the Serie A in seventh position, once again failing to qualify for the UEFA Champions League. He scored 11 goals, his highest tally since 2010–11 season with Club Brugge; and also provided ten assists, including eight in Serie A, breaking his last season's record.

==== 2017–18 season ====
Perišić started his third Inter season on a high, first scoring and assisting in the opening day of 2017–18 Serie A against Fiorentina, then providing two assists in the away match at Roma as Inter won 3–1, Inter Milan's first league win at the Stadio Olimpico in nine years.

On 8 September, Perišić signed a new contract extension with Inter Milan, keeping him at the San Siro until June 2022. Upon signing, Perišić said, "It's a special day, it's certainly emotional and I'm happy after the stress of this summer. Now, we can look forward and I'm only thinking about Inter. After signing, the pitch is the only thing left for me to think about."

His second goal of the season, a late screamer outside the zone against newly promoted SPAL two days later, was his 20th career Serie A goal. Perišić scored his first Serie A hat-trick on 3 December in the 5–0 home win over Chievo. His 100th appearance in all competitions for Inter occurred later on 30 December in the goalless draw versus Lazio on matchday 19.

==== 2018–19 season ====
Perišić played his first Champions League game for Inter on 18 September 2018, in a 2–1 victory over Tottenham Hotspur.

In January 2019, English club Arsenal attempted to sign Perišić. He agreed to a deal with the club; however, Inter Milan blocked the deal. Teammate Mauro Icardi's agent Wanda Nara spoke out about Perišić's reasons for the departure, speculating that they might be of personal nature. Nara's comments resulted in a fallout between the players, resulting in Icardi being stripped of captaincy and dropped from the team ahead of a Europa League away fixture against Rapid Wien.

Perišić featured in 34 matches in Serie A, only behind Samir Handanović and Matteo Politano, scoring 8 goals; hence being the second top scorer for Inter after Icardi. Following the appointment of Antonio Conte, Perišić struggled to fit into the new manager's system during pre-season.

==== 2019–20 season ====
On 13 August 2019, Perišić joined German club Bayern Munich on a season-long loan. Bayern had the option of signing Perišić on a permanent deal in the summer of 2020. On 31 August he scored his first goal for Bayern and provided an assist in a 6–1 victory over Mainz. On 4 February 2020, during training ahead of a DFB-Pokal match against 1899 Hoffenheim, Perišić suffered a right ankle fracture following a tackle from teammate Álvaro Odriozola. He underwent a surgery the same day. He came back to the team on 17 May, coming on for Serge Gnabry in 85th minute of the game against Union Berlin, the club's first game after the league suspension due to the COVID-19 pandemic. On 10 June, he scored the opening goal in a 2–1 victory over Eintracht Frankfurt in the DFB-Pokal semi-final. On 4 July, he provided Robert Lewandowski with an assist in the DFB-Pokal final as Bayern defeated Bayer Leverkusen 4–2 and secured the domestic double. On 8 August, he scored in a Champions League round of 16 second leg, as Bayern defeated Chelsea 4–1 (7–1 on aggregate). Six days later, he scored in a quarter-final 8–2 win over Barcelona at Estádio da Luz. On 23 August, he became the eleventh Croatian to win the Champions League in history, as Bayern defeated Paris Saint-Germain 1–0 in the final.

On 9 September, Bayern announced they had opted not to sign Perišić on permanent deal, after failing to negotiate a deal with Inter and he returned to his parent club.

==== 2020–21 season ====
On 31 October 2020, Perišić scored his first goal of the season for Inter Milan in a 2–2 home draw against Parma. On 3 November, he scored his first Champions League goal for Inter Milan in a 2–3 defeat against Real Madrid. During the spring part of the season, Perišić was praised by Conte for successfully adapting to his system, moving from the position of a winger to that of a wing-back.

On 2 May 2021, four matchdays before the end of the season, Sassuolo drew 1–1 with Atalanta at home, meaning that Inter mathematically secured the Serie A title. It was Inter's first league title since 2009–10 season, ending Juventus' nine-season-long league-winning streak. The title was also Perišić's first trophy with the Nerrazzuri.

==== 2021–22 season ====
On 24 November 2021, Perišić was praised for his performance in the 2–0 victory over Shakhtar Donetsk in the Champions League, as he assisted Edin Džeko's second goal, although his goal and Lautaro Martínez's goal that he also assisted were ruled out. The victory qualified Inter Milan for the Round of 16 for the first time since the 2011–12 season.

On 11 May 2022, in the Coppa Italia final against Juventus, Perišić broke the deadlock in the first half of extra time by scoring a brace and bringing the score from 2–2 to the eventual 4–2.

=== Tottenham Hotspur ===
On 31 May 2022, Tottenham Hotspur signed Perišić on a free transfer, reuniting him with former manager Antonio Conte. He became the fifth Croatian in history to sign with the club. He played his first minutes for the club in a 2–1 friendly victory over Rangers on 23 July. Perišić made his Premier League debut on 6 August 2022, coming on as a second-half substitute for Ryan Sessegnon in a 4–1 home victory over Southampton.

On 20 September 2023, the club confirmed that Perišić had sustained a complex anterior cruciate ligament (ACL) injury in his right knee in non-contact training and that he would undergo surgery.

=== Hajduk Split ===
On 19 January 2024, Perišić returned to his hometown club Hajduk Split. Initially, he joined the club on loan until the end of the season, with Hajduk later announcing it had reached an agreement with the player to remain at the club for another season, following the expiration of his contract with Tottenham Hotspur. On 30 August 2024, Perišić and Hajduk terminated the contract by mutual consent. An attempt was made for a transfer to one of the clubs in Serie A, but was not successfully completed before the transfer deadline.

=== PSV ===
On 18 September 2024, Dutch club PSV signed Perišić on a free transfer, signing on a one-year deal. On 2 November, Perišić scored his first goal for PSV in a 3–2 defeat against Ajax. He scored his first UEFA Champions League goal for PSV on 11 February 2025 in a 2–1 defeat to Juventus. On the return leg, he scored again in a 3–1 victory, making him the oldest ever player to score in consecutive Champions League knockout stage matches.

== International career ==
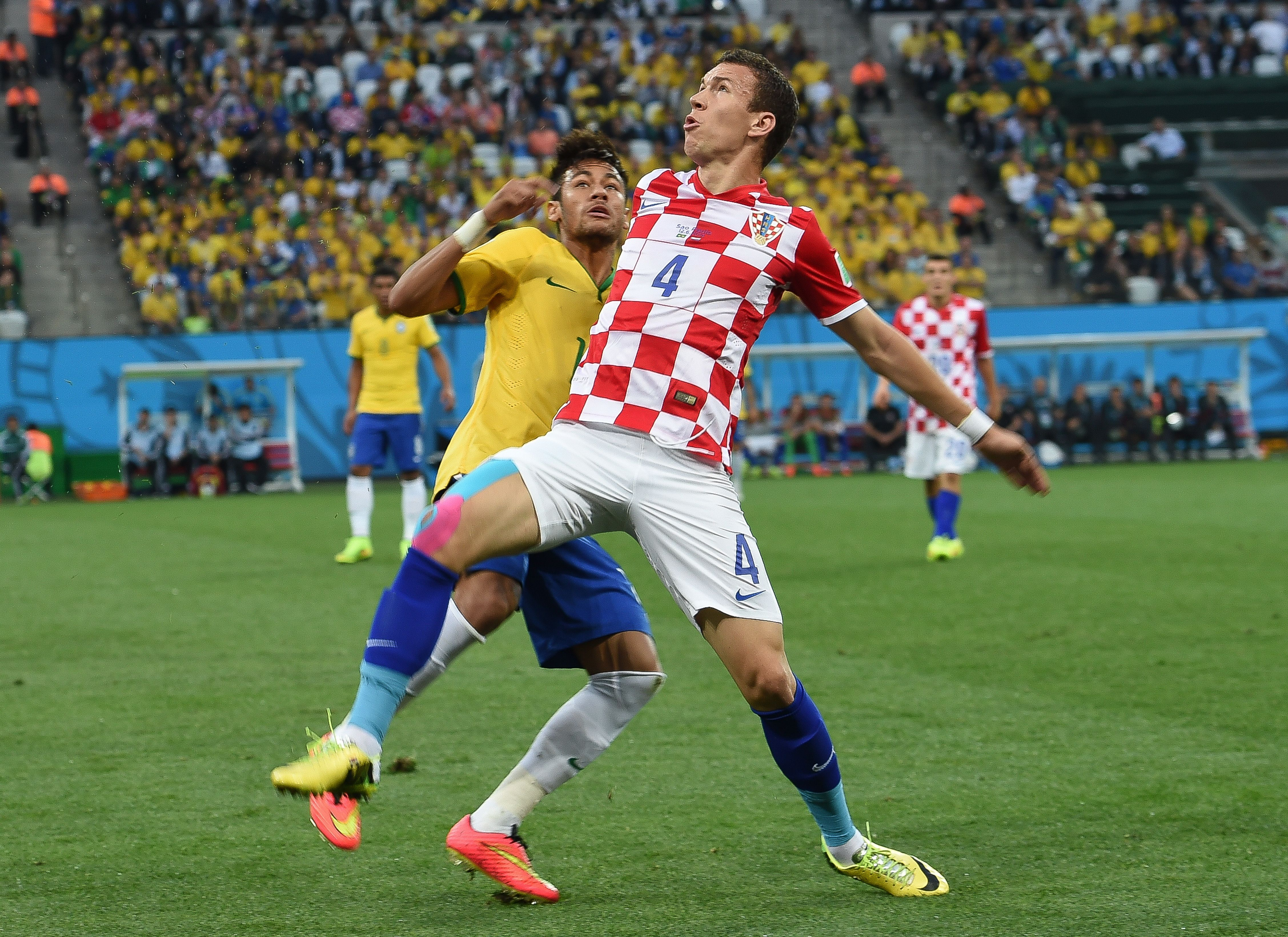
Perišić (number 4) playing for Croatia against Brazil at the 2014 FIFA World Cup

Perišić has appeared internationally for the Croatia national under-17, under-19 and under-21 teams. He participated in the 2011 UEFA European Under-21 Championship qualification for Croatia, where he scored two goals. On 26 March 2011, at age 22, Perišić made his debut for the senior national team against Georgia. He was a member of Croatia's squad for UEFA Euro 2012, starting in the team's opening two matches against the Republic of Ireland and Italy, and appearing as a substitute in the team's final match, a 1–0 loss to Spain.

During the 2014 FIFA World Cup qualification, Perišić appeared in 12 matches for Croatia and scored his first international goal in a 1–1 draw with Belgium. On 14 May, Perišić was named in Croatia's 30-man preliminary squad for the 2014 FIFA World Cup. On 31 May, he scored a brace in a 2–1 win against Mali in a World Cup warm-up match in Osijek. Perišić was confirmed as a member of Croatia's final 23-man World Cup squad on 2 June. Perišić was in Croatia's starting team for the opening match of the 2014 World Cup, a controversial 3–1 defeat to tournament hosts Brazil at the Arena Corinthians, São Paulo. In the following match, he scored Croatia's second goal as they defeated Cameroon 4–0. On 23 June, he scored a consolation goal in the team's final group match, 3–1 defeat to Mexico which eliminated them from the tournament. Despite Croatia's early elimination, Perišić was ranked as the second-best performing player of the group stage by FIFA.

Perišić was Croatia's top goalscorer in UEFA Euro 2016 qualifying, scoring six goals in nine matches as Croatia qualified in second place in Group H. In Croatia's second UEFA Euro 2016 group match, Perišić scored the opening goal of a 2–2 draw with the Czech Republic. Five days later, he scored the winning goal against Spain, which secured qualification to the knockout stage as group winners for Croatia. The tournament however ended in disappointment as they were subsequently knocked out in the round of 16 to eventual winners Portugal.

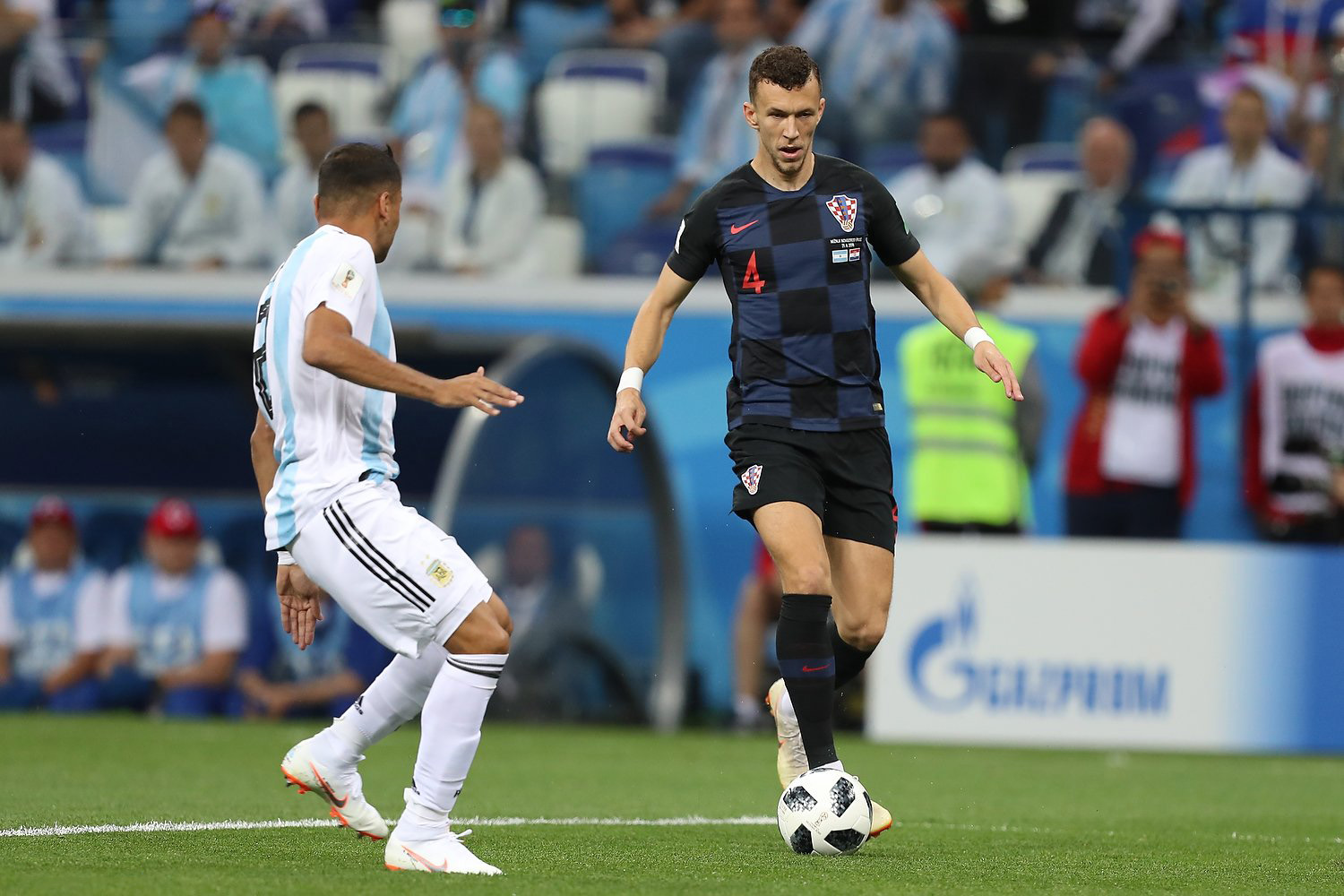
Perišić (right) playing for Croatia against Argentina at the 2018 FIFA World Cup

Perišić appeared regularly in Croatia's successful 2018 FIFA World Cup qualifying campaign, as they finished runner-up in Group I which sent them to second round. The team played Greece, winning the first leg 4–1, with Perišić scoring the third goal in 33rd minute. Croatia booked their spot to the World Cup final stages in Russia on 12 November by playing a goalless draw in the returning leg. In May 2018, Perišić was named in Croatia's final squad for the 2018 World Cup. In the third group stage match, Perišić scored in the last minute of the regular time in the 2–1 win over Iceland as Croatia topped Group D on full points.

During Croatia's semi-final match against England on 11 July, Perišić scored Croatia's equaliser in the second half of regulation time, and later also set-up Mario Mandžukić's match-winning goal in the second half of extra-time to give Croatia a 2–1 victory, sending the team to the World Cup final for the first time in their history. He was named Man of the Match. In the final against France on 15 July, he scored Croatia's temporary equaliser in the first half, although the match eventually ended in a 4–2 defeat to France. Perišić covered the most ground of any player in the tournament, running a total of 72.5 kilometres.

During Euro 2020 qualifying, Perišić scored three times—against Wales at home and Slovakia home and away—as Croatia topped Group E. On 19 November 2019, he captained the national team for the first time ever in a friendly 2–1 victory over Georgia, scoring the winning goal. On 8 September 2020, he captained Croatia once again in a 4–2 Nations League defeat to France at Stade de France.

On 1 June 2021, Perišić made this 100th appearance for the national team in a friendly 1–1 draw with Armenia in which he scored Croatia's goal. He was selected in Croatia's final squad for UEFA Euro 2020, where he was the team's most efficient performer, scoring twice (in the 1–1 draw with the Czech Republic and the 3–1 victory over Scotland) and assisting once (in the latter match). However, on 27 June, he tested positive for COVID-19 which ruled him out of the squad for the knockout phase.

On 9 November 2022, Perišić was selected in Croatia's final squad for the 2022 FIFA World Cup. At the tournament, he assisted three times—twice in the 4–1 group stage victory over Canada and once in the 2–1 third place play-off victory over Morocco—and scored once, the equalizer in the 1–1 round of 16 draw with Japan. That way, he extended his record of the Croatia player with the most goal contributions at major tournaments (18), as well as surpassed Davor Šuker as the Croatia player with the most goals scored at major tournaments (10).

Perišić playing for Croatia at the 2026 FIFA World Cup

On 18 May 2026, Perišić was named in Croatia's 26-man squad for the 2026 FIFA World Cup, marking his fourth appearance in the tournament. He provided an assist in Croatia's 4–2 defeat to England in their opening match, becoming the second player to register assists in four different World Cup tournaments, after Lionel Messi. After Perišić scored to open Croatia's round of 32 match against Portugal, Croatia was ultimately knocked out in a 2–1 defeat. However, he scored his seventh World Cup goal, becoming Croatia's all-time leading scorer in the competition by surpassing Davor Šuker's record, and the first Croatian player to score in four different World Cup tournaments. At 37 years and 150 days, he also became the oldest Croatian goalscorer in World Cup history, surpassing Ivica Olić.

Perišić scored the opening goal against Spain during Croatia's eventual 2–1 defeat during the 2026–27 UEFA Nations League, his 40th international goal. He received two yellow cards during the match, resulting in a red card ejection.

== Player profile ==
Perišić has been lauded by the likes of Luciano Spalletti, José Mourinho, Antonio Conte, Hansi Flick and other high-profile managers. Alongside his ambipedality, ESPN stated in 2016 that Perišić is "defensively superb in tracking back and working for the team, while his ability to find space and his calmness on the ball is exemplary."

== Personal life ==
Born in Split, Perišić grew up in the town of Omiš, where his parents are from. As a child, he worked on his father's poultry farm.

Perišić married Josipa in 2012, having first met her while they were in high school. The pair have two children.

== Beach volleyball ==
Perišić took part at the 2017 FIVB Beach Volleyball World Tour for the Poreč Major tournament, a professional competition, partnering Nikša Dellorco. The pair lost their first match against Álvaro Morais Filho and Saymon Barbosa.

== Career statistics ==
=== Club ===
As of match played 4 November 2026

Appearances and goals by club, season and competition
Club	Season	League			National cup (Note: Includes Belgian Cup, DFB-Pokal, Coppa Italia, FA Cup, Croatian Cup, KNVB Cup)		League cup (Note: Includes EFL Cup)		Europe		Other		Total	
Club	Season	Division	Apps	Goals	Apps	Goals	Apps	Goals	Apps	Goals	Apps	Goals	Apps	Goals
Roeselare (loan)	2008–09	Belgian Pro League	18	5	2	3	—		—		0	0	20	8
Club Brugge	2009–10	Belgian Pro League	33	9	2	0	—		8 (Note: Appearances in UEFA Europa League)	4	—		43	13
Club Brugge	2010–11	Belgian Pro League	37	22	1	0	—		8	0	—		46	22
Club Brugge	Total		70	31	3	0	—		16	4	—		89	35
Borussia Dortmund	2011–12	Bundesliga	28	7	6	1	—		6 (Note: Appearances in UEFA Champions League)	1	1 (Note: Appearances in DFL-Supercup)	0	41	9
Borussia Dortmund	2012–13	Bundesliga	14	2	3	1	—		5	0	1	0	23	3
Borussia Dortmund	Total		42	9	9	2	—		11	1	2	0	64	12
VfL Wolfsburg	2012–13	Bundesliga	11	2	0	0	—		—		—		11	2
VfL Wolfsburg	2013–14	Bundesliga	33	10	5	1	—		—		—		38	11
VfL Wolfsburg	2014–15	Bundesliga	24	5	2	1	—		9	1	—		35	7
VfL Wolfsburg	2015–16	Bundesliga	2	1	1	0	—		—		1	0	4	1
VfL Wolfsburg	Total		70	18	8	2	—		9	1	1	0	88	21
Inter Milan	2015–16	Serie A	34	7	3	2	—		—		—		37	9
Inter Milan	2016–17	Serie A	36	11	1	0	—		5	0	—		42	11
Inter Milan	2017–18	Serie A	37	11	2	0	—		—		—		39	11
Inter Milan	2018–19	Serie A	34	8	1	0	—		10 (Note: Six appearances in UEFA Champions League, four appearances and one goal in UEFA Europa League)	1	—		45	9
Inter Milan	2020–21	Serie A	32	4	4	0	—		6	1	—		42	5
Inter Milan	2021–22	Serie A	35	8	5	2	—		8	0	1 (Note: Appearance in Supercoppa Italiana)	0	49	10
Inter Milan	Total		208	49	16	4	—		29	2	1	0	254	55
Bayern Munich (loan)	2019–20	Bundesliga	22	4	3	1	—		10	3	—		35	8
Tottenham Hotspur	2022–23	Premier League	34	1	2	0	1	0	7	0	—		44	1
Tottenham Hotspur	2023–24	Premier League	5	0	0	0	1	0	—		—		6	0
Tottenham Hotspur	Total		39	1	2	0	2	0	7	0	—		50	1
Hajduk Split (loan)	2023–24	HNL	7	1	1	0	—		—		—		8	1
Hajduk Split	2024–25	HNL	1	0	0	0	—		3 (Note: Appearances in UEFA Conference League)	0	—		4	0
Hajduk Split	Hajduk total		8	1	1	0	—		3	0	—		12	1
PSV Eindhoven	2024–25	Eredivisie	27	9	4	4	—		4	3	—		35	16
PSV Eindhoven	2025–26	Eredivisie	30	7	4	2	—		8	1	1 (Note: Appearance in Johan Cruyff Shield)	0	43	10
PSV Eindhoven	2026–27	Eredivisie	10	2	0	0	—		4	0	1	0	15	2
PSV Eindhoven	Total		67	18	8	6	—		16	4	2	0	93	28
Career total			544	136	51	18	2	0	101	15	6	0	705	169

=== International ===
As of match played 15 November 2026

Appearances and goals by national team and year
National team	Year	Apps	Goals
Croatia	2011	7	0
Croatia	2012	11	1
Croatia	2013	8	0
Croatia	2014	9	7
Croatia	2015	8	3
Croatia	2016	12	5
Croatia	2017	8	1
Croatia	2018	15	5
Croatia	2019	10	4
Croatia	2020	8	0
Croatia	2021	15	6
Croatia	2022	12	1
Croatia	2023	6	0
Croatia	2024	11	0
Croatia	2025	10	5
Croatia	2026	13	3
Total		163	41

Scores and results list Croatia's goal tally first.

List of international goals scored by Ivan Perišić
No.	Date	Venue	Cap	Opponent	Score	Result	Competition
1	11 September 2012	King Baudouin Stadium, Brussels, Belgium	11	Belgium	1–0	1–1	2014 FIFA World Cup qualification
2	31 May 2014	Gradski Vrt Stadium, Osijek, Croatia	28	Mali	1–0	2–1	Friendly
3	31 May 2014	Gradski Vrt Stadium, Osijek, Croatia	28	Mali	2–0	2–1	Friendly
4	18 June 2014	Arena da Amazônia, Manaus, Brazil	31	Cameroon	2–0	4–0	2014 FIFA World Cup
5	23 June 2014	Arena Pernambuco, Recife, Brazil	32	Mexico	1–3	1–3	2014 FIFA World Cup
6	13 October 2014	Gradski Vrt Stadium, Osijek, Croatia	34	Azerbaijan	2–0	6–0	UEFA Euro 2016 qualifying
7	13 October 2014	Gradski Vrt Stadium, Osijek, Croatia	34	Azerbaijan	3–0	6–0	UEFA Euro 2016 qualifying
8	16 November 2014	San Siro, Milan, Italy	35	Italy	1–1	1–1	UEFA Euro 2016 qualifying
9	28 March 2015	Stadion Maksimir, Zagreb, Croatia	36	Norway	2–0	5–1	UEFA Euro 2016 qualifying
10	10 October 2015	Stadion Maksimir, Zagreb, Croatia	41	Bulgaria	1–0	3–0	UEFA Euro 2016 qualifying
11	13 October 2015	National Stadium, Ta' Qali, Malta	42	Malta	1–0	1–0	UEFA Euro 2016 qualifying
12	23 March 2016	Gradski Vrt Stadium, Osijek, Croatia	44	Israel	1–0	2–0	Friendly
13	4 June 2016	Stadion Rujevica, Rijeka, Croatia	47	San Marino	6–0	10–0	Friendly
14	17 June 2016	Stade Geoffroy-Guichard, Saint-Étienne, France	49	Czech Republic	1–0	2–2	UEFA Euro 2016
15	21 June 2016	Nouveau Stade de Bordeaux, Bordeaux, France	50	Spain	2–1	2–1	UEFA Euro 2016
16	6 October 2016	Loro Boriçi Stadium, Shkodër, Albania	53	Kosovo	5–0	6–0	2018 FIFA World Cup qualification
17	9 November 2017	Stadion Maksimir, Zagreb, Croatia	62	Greece	3–1	4–1	2018 FIFA World Cup qualification
18	8 June 2018	Gradski Vrt Stadium, Osijek, Croatia	66	Senegal	1–1	2–1	Friendly
19	26 June 2018	Rostov Arena, Rostov-on-Don, Russia	69	Iceland	2–1	2–1	2018 FIFA World Cup
20	11 July 2018	Luzhniki Stadium, Moscow, Russia	72	England	1–1	2–1	2018 FIFA World Cup
21	15 July 2018	Luzhniki Stadium, Moscow, Russia	73	France	1–1	2–4	2018 FIFA World Cup
22	6 September 2018	Estádio Algarve, Faro/Loulé, Portugal	74	Portugal	1–0	1–1	Friendly
23	8 June 2019	Gradski Vrt Stadium, Osijek, Croatia	81	Wales	2–0	2–1	UEFA Euro 2020 qualifying
24	6 September 2019	Anton Malatinský Stadium, Trnava, Slovakia	83	Slovakia	2–0	4–0	UEFA Euro 2020 qualifying
25	16 November 2019	Stadion Rujevica, Rijeka, Croatia	87	Slovakia	3–1	3–1	UEFA Euro 2020 qualifying
26	19 November 2019	Stadion Aldo Drosina, Pula, Croatia	88	Georgia	2–1	2–1	Friendly
27	30 March 2021	Stadion Rujevica, Rijeka, Croatia	99	Malta	1–0	3–0	2022 FIFA World Cup qualification
28	1 June 2021	Stadion Radnik, Velika Gorica, Croatia	100	Armenia	1–0	1–1	Friendly
29	18 June 2021	Hampden Park, Glasgow, Scotland	103	Czech Republic	1–1	1–1	UEFA Euro 2020
30	22 June 2021	Hampden Park, Glasgow, Scotland	104	Scotland	3–1	3–1	UEFA Euro 2020
31	8 October 2021	AEK Arena – Georgios Karapatakis, Larnaca, Cyprus	108	Cyprus	1–0	3–0	2022 FIFA World Cup qualification
32	11 November 2021	National Stadium, Ta' Qali, Malta	110	Malta	1–0	7–1	2022 FIFA World Cup qualification
33	5 December 2022	Al Janoub Stadium, Al Wakrah, Qatar	120	Japan	1–1	1–1	2022 FIFA World Cup
34	20 March 2025	Stadion Poljud, Split, Croatia	141	France	2–0	2–0	2024–25 UEFA Nations League A
35	6 June 2025	Estádio Algarve, Faro/Loulé, Portugal	143	Gibraltar	5–0	7–0	2026 FIFA World Cup qualification
36	9 June 2025	Opus Arena, Osijek, Croatia	144	Czech Republic	3–1	5–1	2026 FIFA World Cup qualification
37	8 September 2025	Stadion Maksimir, Zagreb, Croatia	146	Montenegro	4–0	4–0	2026 FIFA World Cup qualification
38	17 November 2025	Podgorica City Stadium, Podgorica, Montenegro	150	Montenegro	1–2	3–2	2026 FIFA World Cup qualification
39	2 July 2026	BMO Field, Toronto, Canada	158	Portugal	1–0	1–2	2026 FIFA World Cup
40	6 October 2026	Stadion Poljud, Split, Croatia	162	Spain	1–0	1–2	2026–27 UEFA Nations League A
41	15 November 2026	Opus Arena, Osijek, Croatia	163	Czech Republic	1–0	2–1	2026–27 UEFA Nations League A

== Honours ==
Borussia Dortmund

- Bundesliga: 2011–12
- DFB-Pokal: 2011–12
- UEFA Champions League runner-up: 2012–13

VfL Wolfsburg

- DFB-Pokal: 2014–15
- DFL-Supercup: 2015

Bayern Munich

- Bundesliga: 2019–20
- DFB-Pokal: 2019–20
- UEFA Champions League: 2019–20

Inter Milan

- Serie A: 2020–21
- Coppa Italia: 2021–22
- Supercoppa Italiana: 2021

PSV Eindhoven

- Eredivisie: 2024–25, 2025–26
- Johan Cruyff Shield: 2025

Croatia

- FIFA World Cup runner-up: 2018; third place: 2022
- UEFA Nations League runner-up: 2022–23

Individual

- Belgian Pro League top goalscorer: 2010–11
- Belgian Professional Footballer of the Year: 2010–11
- Vatrena krila: 2014
- Serie A Goal of the Month: April 2022
- Eredivisie Player of the Month: May 2025
- Eredivisie Team of the Month:May 2025,

Orders

- Order of Duke Branimir: 2018

== See also ==
- List of men's footballers with 100 or more international caps
- List of FIFA World Cup top goalscorers
