= Moussa Souare =

Guinean footballer

Personal information
- Full name: Moussa Souare
- Date of birth: 1 July 1998 (age 28)
- Place of birth: Conakry, Guinea
- Height: 1.73 m (5 ft 8 in)
- Position: Forward

Team information
- Current team: Sancataldese

Youth career
- Santarcangelo
- 2014–2015: → Sassuolo (loan)
- 2015–2016: → Bologna (loan)
- 2016–2017: → Internazionale (loan)
- 2017: Internazionale

Senior career*
Years	Team	Apps	(Gls)
2016–2019	Internazionale	0	(0)
2017–2018	→ Monopoli (loan)	13	(0)
2018	→ Mosta (loan)	4	(0)
2019	→ La Fiorita (loan)	12	(3)
2019–2020	Forlì	21	(2)
2020–2021	Pennarossa	15	(3)
2021–	Sancataldese		
- * Club domestic league appearances and goals as of 5 August 2021

Moussa Souare (born 1 July 1998), is a Guinean professional footballer who plays as a forward for Italian club Sancataldese.

== Club career ==
=== Internazionale ===
==== Loan to Monopoli and Mosta ====
On 11 August 2017, Souare was signed by Serie C side Monopoli on a 6-month loan deal. On 26 August, Souare made his Serie C debut in a 3–1 home win over Cosenza, he was replaced by Davide Balestrero in the 69th minute. Souare ended his 6-month loan to Monopoli with 13 appearances, but he never played an entire match.

On 31 January 2018, Souare was loaned to Maltese Premier League side Mosta on an 18-month loan deal. On 25 February he made his Maltese Premier League debut in a 2–0 home defeat against Hamrun Spartans, he played the entire match.

=== La Fiorita ===
On 25 January 2019, Souare moved to Sammarinese club La Fiorita.

== Career statistics ==
=== Club ===
As of 2 April 2018

Club	Season	League			Cup		Europe		Other		Total	
Club	Season	League	Apps	Goals	Apps	Goals	Apps	Goals	Apps	Goals	Apps	Goals
Pistoiese (loan)	2017–18	Serie C	13	0	0	0	—		—		13	0
Mosta (loan)	2017–18	Maltese Premier League	4	0	—		—		—		4	0
Career total			17	0	0	0	—		—		17	0

== Honours ==
=== Club ===
Inter Primavera

- Campionato Nazionale Primavera: 2016–17
