= Karamoh =

Karamoh is both a given name and a surname. Notable people with the name include:

- Karamoh Kabba (born 1965), Sierra Leonean author
- Yann Karamoh (born 1998), Ivorian footballer
