= Mattia Bonetto =

Italian professional footballer

Personal information
- Date of birth: 23 January 1997 (age 29)
- Place of birth: Montebelluna, Italy
- Height: 1.90 m (6 ft 3 in)
- Position: Midfielder

Youth career
- Montebelluna

Senior career*
| Years | Team | Apps | (Gls) |
| 2013–2014 | Montebelluna | 21 | (1) |
| 2014–2018 | Internazionale | 0 | (0) |
| 2016–2017 | → Reggiana (loan) | 4 | (0) |
| 2017 | → Renate (loan) | 0 | (0) |
| 2017–2018 | → Prato (loan) | 21 | (0) |
| 2018–2019 | Reggina | 6 | (1) |
| 2019 | Rende | 10 | (0) |
| 2019–2020 | Levico Terme | 11 | (0) |
| 2020–2023 | Adriese | 50 | (6) |

International career
| 2016 | Italy U19 | 1 | (0) |
- * Club domestic league appearances and goals as of 15 February 2026

Mattia Bonetto (born 23 January 1997) is an Italian footballer who plays as a midfielder.

== Club career ==
=== Internazionale ===
In July 2014, Bonetto joined to Inter Primavera (Inter U-19) from Serie D club Montebelluna with Pietro Maronilli and Alex Rizzotto. In the 2015–16 season he won the Coppa Italia Primavera. Bonetto with Inter Primavera made 43 appearances, scored 3 goals and making 3 assists.

==== Loan to Reggiana and Renate ====
On 5 July 2016, Bonetto was signed by Serie C side Reggiana on a season-long loan deal. On 7 August he made his professional debut in a 3–1 away defeat against Pro Vercelli in the second round of Coppa Italia, he was replaced by Hector Otin in the 87th minute. On 27 August he made his debut in Serie C in a 2–1 away defeat against Bassano Virtus, he was replaced by Dario Maltese in the 81st minute. In January 2017, Bonetto was re-called to Inter leaving Reggiana with only 5 appearances, 3 as a substitute.

On 31 January 2018, Bonetto was loaned to Serie C club Renate on a 6-month loan deal. During the loan he never played any match.

==== Loan to Prato ====
On 11 July 2018, Bonetto was signed by Serie C club Prato on a season-long loan deal. On 4 October he made his debut for Prato as a substitute replacing Nicola Guglielmelli in the 60th minute of a 5–2 home defeat against Carrarese. On 15 October, Bonetto played his first match as a starter for Prato, a 3–2 home defeat against Monza, he was replaced by Lorenzo Liurni in the 70th minute. On 8 November he played his first entire match for Prato, a 0–0 away draw against Lucchese. Bonetto ended his season-long loan to Prato with 21 appearances and 2 assists, but Prato was relegated in Serie D.

=== Reggina ===
On 9 July 2018, Bonetto joined to Serie C club Reggina with an undisclosed fee and a 2-year contract.

=== Rende ===
On 21 January 2019, he moved to Rende.

=== Levico Terme ===
On 6 December 2019 he signed with Serie D club Levico Terme.

== International career ==
He made his first appearance for his country on 24 February 2016 with the Italy national under-19 football team in a friendly against France.

== Career statistics ==
=== Club ===
As of 29 May 2018

| Club | Season | League | | | Cup | | Europe | | Other | | Total | |
| Club | Season | League | Apps | Goals | Apps | Goals | Apps | Goals | Apps | Goals | Apps | Goals |
|---|---|---|---|---|---|---|---|---|---|---|---|---|
| Reggiana (loan) | 2016–17 | Serie C | 4 | 0 | 1 | 0 | — | | — | | 5 | 0 |
| Renate (loan) | 2016–17 | Serie C | 0 | 0 | — | | — | | — | | 0 | 0 |
| Prato (loan) | 2017–18 | Serie C | 21 | 0 | 0 | 0 | — | | — | | 21 | 0 |
| Reggina | 2018–19 | Serie C | 0 | 0 | 0 | 0 | — | | — | | 0 | 0 |
| Career total | | | 25 | 0 | 1 | 0 | — | | — | | 26 | 0 |

== Honours ==
=== Club ===
Inter Primavera

- Coppa Italia Primavera: 2015–16
