= Martin Eimer =

Psychology professor

Martin Eimer FBA is professor of psychology, Birkbeck College, University of London. He was elected a fellow of the British Academy in 2016. Eimer is a specialist in cognitive and neural mechanisms of visual attention and working memory, integration of attention across sensory modalities, and face perception and recognition and their impairment in prosopagnosia.
