= Tomoko Nagatomo =

Japanese archaeologist

Tomoko Nagatomo (born 1972) is a Japanese archaeologist. She is a professor at Ritsumeikan University in Kyoto, Japan.

== Biography ==
Nagatomo was born in Kyoto. She studied at Osaka University, completing a Ph.D. in literature. She was an associate professor at Osaka Ohtani University.

Nagatomo studies the Yayoi and Kofun periods, particularly the equipment production and food culture of these periods.
