= Loris Zonta =

Italian footballer

Personal information
- Date of birth: 22 May 1997 (age 29)
- Place of birth: Bassano del Grappa, Italy
- Height: 1.78 m (5 ft 10 in)
- Position: Midfielder

Team information
- Current team: Vicenza
- Number: 29

Youth career
- –2011: Bassano Virtus
- 2011–2015: Inter Milan

Senior career*
Years	Team	Apps	(Gls)
2016–2017	Inter Milan	0	(0)
2017	→ Pisa (loan)	3	(0)
2018	Bassano Virtus	17	(2)
2018–	Vicenza	202	(11)
2023–2024	→ Taranto (loan)	35	(4)
- * Club domestic league appearances and goals as of 29 April 2026

Loris Zonta (born 22 May 1997) is an Italian footballer who plays for Serie B club Vicenza.

== Club career ==
On 30 January 2017 he was signed by Pisa on an 18 month-loan. On 19 February 2017 he made his professional debut for Pisa as a substitute replacing Federico Angiulli in the 87th minute in the Serie B in a 0-0 home draw against Frosinone. His loan spell at Pisa ended at the start of the winter 2017–18 transfer period and Zonta returned to Bassano Virtus on a permanent transfer on 10 January 2018.

On 9 August 2023, Zonta joined Taranto on loan with an option to buy.
