= Raffaele Di Gennaro =

Italian footballer

Personal information
- Full name: Raffaele Di Gennaro
- Date of birth: 3 October 1993 (age 33)
- Place of birth: Saronno, Italy
- Height: 1.88 m (6 ft 2 in)
- Position: Goalkeeper

Team information
- Current team: Inter Milan
- Number: 12

Youth career
- 2002–2012: Inter Milan

Senior career*
Years	Team	Apps	(Gls)
2012–2019	Inter Milan	0	(0)
2013–2014	→ Cittadella (loan)	39	(0)
2014–2016	→ Latina (loan)	41	(0)
2016–2017	→ Ternana (loan)	16	(0)
2017–2018	→ Spezia (loan)	23	(0)
2019–2021	Catanzaro	42	(0)
2021–2022	Pescara	11	(0)
2022–2023	Gubbio	30	(0)
2023–	Inter Milan	2	(0)

International career
2008	Italy U16	1	(0)
2013–2014	Italy U20	3	(0)
- * Club domestic league appearances and goals as of 17 May 2026

Raffaele Di Gennaro (born 3 October 1993) is an Italian professional footballer who plays as a goalkeeper for Serie A club Inter Milan.

== Club career ==
=== Inter Milan ===
Di Gennaro was the starting goalkeeper for Inter U19, which went on to win the NextGen Series and the Campionato Nazionale Primavera. Di Gennaro missed half of both the 2010–11 and 2011–12 seasons due to injury. Di Gennaro remained as one of the keepers for Primavera in the 2012–13 season as an overage player.

==== Loan to Cittadella ====
In July 2013, Di Gennaro was loaned out to Serie B club Cittadella He made his professional debut on 11 August in the second round of Coppa Italia in a 1–0 home win over Savona. Six days later, on 18 August, he played in third round in a 4–0 away defeat against Inter. On 24 August, Di Gennaro made his Serie B debut and he kept his first clean sheet for Cittadella in a 0–0 away draw against Spezia. On 14 September he kept his second clean sheet in a 0–0 home draw against Latina. Two weeks later his third in a 1–0 home win over Crotone. Di Gennaro ended his loan to Cittadella with 41 appearances and 12 clean sheets and conceding 50 goals.

==== Loan to Latina ====
On 11 July 2014, Di Gennaro was signed by Latina on a season-long loan deal. On 4 October he made his debut for Latina in Serie B in a 1–0 away defeat against Trapani, in his debut match he received a red card. On 6 December, Di Gennaro kept his first clean sheet for Latina in a 0–0 away draw against Perugia. Nine days later he kept his second clean sheet in a 1–0 home win over Varese, and on 28 December his third in a 0–0 away draw against Modena. Di Gennaro ended his loan to Latina with 28 appearances, 11 clean sheets and 23 goals conceded.

On 11 July 2015, he returned to Serie B side Latina for his second loan spell. On 9 August, Di Gennaro played his first match of the season for Latina in the second round of Coppa Italia in a 4–1 home defeat against Pavia. On 6 September he made his "second" Serie B debut for the club in a 1–1 away draw against Novara. On 11 October, Di Gennaro kept his first clean sheet of the season in a 2–0 away win over Modena. On 15 November 2016, he injured his hand during a match against Avellino, after that he become the second goalkeeper, but he did not play any other matches. Di Gennaro ended his second loan to Latina with 13 appearances, he kept only 3 clean sheets and conceded 19 goals.

==== Loan to Ternana ====
On 19 August 2016, Di Gennaro and Fabio Della Giovanna were loaned out to Serie B side Ternana on a season-long loan. On 7 September his made his debut for Ternana and he kept his first clean sheet for the club in Serie B in a 1–0 win over Pisa. On 20 September he kept his second clean sheet in a 0–0 home draw against Bari. He became the second goalkeeper after the arrival of Simone Aresti on loan from Pescara. Di Gennaro kept only those two clean sheets in 16 matches played for Ternana, he conceded 23 goals.

==== Loan to Spezia ====
On 12 July 2017, Di Gennaro and Francesco Forte were signed by Serie B side Spezia with a season-long loan. On 3 September he made his debut for Spezia in Serie B in a 1–0 home defeat against Carpi, this was his 100th professional match. Two weeks later he kept his first clean sheet for Spezia in a 0–0 away draw against Venezia. Four days later, on 19 September, he kept his second clean sheet in a 1–0 home win over Novara. On 28 October his third in a 0–0 home draw against Cittadella. Di Gennaro ended his season-long loan to Spezia with 23 appearances, 11 clean sheets and 18 goals conceded.

==== 2018–19 season ====
Di Gennaro was not loaned out for the 2018–19 season and included in Inter's European squad for 2018–19 UEFA Champions League as well as 2018–19 UEFA Europa League. However, Di Gennaro was excluded from the squad list that was submitted to Serie A. He was assigned number 93 shirt.

=== Serie C ===
On 13 August 2019, Di Gennaro joined Serie C club Catanzaro on a free transfer, and he signed a two-year contract.

On 14 August 2021, he moved to Pescara, also in Serie C.

On 18 July 2022, Di Gennaro signed with Gubbio.

=== Return to Inter Milan ===
On 13 July 2023, Di Gennaro returned to Inter, signing a one-year deal. On 26 May 2024, he made his first-team debut for his childhood club, coming on as a substitute for Emil Audero in the 68th minute in the last match of the 2023–24 season against Hellas Verona.

== Career statistics ==
As of match played 17 May 2026

Appearances and goals by club, season and competition
Club	Season	League			Coppa Italia		Europe		Other		Total	
Club	Season	Division	Apps	Goals	Apps	Goals	Apps	Goals	Apps	Goals	Apps	Goals
Inter Milan	2012−13	Serie A	0	0	0	0	0	0	—		0	0
Cittadella (loan)	2013−14	Serie B	39	0	2	0	—		—		41	0
Latina (loan)	2014−15	Serie B	28	0	0	0	—		—		28	0
Latina (loan)	2015−16	Serie B	13	0	1	0	—		—		14	0
Latina (loan)	Total		41	0	1	0	—		—		42	0
Ternana (loan)	2016−17	Serie B	16	0	0	0	—		—		16	0
Spezia (loan)	2017−18	Serie B	23	0	0	0	—		—		23	0
Catanzaro	2019–20	Serie C	22	0	2	0	—		0	0	24	0
Catanzaro	2020–21	Serie C	20	0	1	0	—		2 (Note: Appearances in Serie C play-offs)	0	23	0
Catanzaro	Total		42	0	3	0	—		2	0	47	0
Pescara	2021–22	Serie C	11	0	1	0	—		0	0	12	0
Gubbio	2022–23	Serie C	30	0	0	0	—		4	0	34	0
Inter Milan	2023–24	Serie A	1	0	0	0	0	0	0	0	1	0
Inter Milan	2024−25	Serie A	0	0	0	0	0	0	0	0	0	0
Inter Milan	2025−26	Serie A	1	0	0	0	0	0	0	0	1	0
Inter Milan	2026−27	Serie A	0	0	0	0	0	0	0	0	0	0
Inter Milan	Total		2	0	0	0	0	0	0	0	2	0
Career total			204	0	7	0	0	0	6	0	217	0

== Honours ==
Inter Primavera

- NextGen Series: 2011–12
- Campionato Nazionale Primavera: 2011–12

Inter Milan

- Serie A: 2023–24
- Coppa Italia: 2025–26
- Supercoppa Italiana: 2023
