= Icardi =

Icardi is a surname. Notable people with the surname include:

- Andrea Icardi (born 1963), Italian footballer and manager
- Ivana Icardi (born 1995), Spanish-Argentine Actress
- Mauro Icardi (born 1993), Argentine footballer
- Norma Icardi (born 1930), Italian gymnast
- Simone Icardi (born 1996), Italian football player
