= Fabio Della Giovanna =

Italian professional footballer

Personal information
- Date of birth: 21 March 1997 (age 29)
- Place of birth: Vizzolo Predabissi, Italy
- Height: 1.82 m (6 ft 0 in)
- Position: Centre-back

Team information
- Current team: Cjarlins Muzane
- Number: 28

Youth career
- 2014–2016: Inter

Senior career*
| Years | Team | Apps | (Gls) |
| 2015–2017 | Inter | 1 | (0) |
| 2016–2017 | → Ternana (loan) | 2 | (0) |
| 2017–2019 | SPAL | 0 | (0) |
| 2018 | → Arezzo (loan) | 10 | (0) |
| 2018–2019 | → Südtirol (loan) | 10 | (0) |
| 2019–2021 | Imolese | 25 | (1) |
| 2021–2023 | Pro Sesto | 32 | (0) |
| 2023–2024 | Asti | 24 | (0) |
| 2024– | Cjarlins Muzane | 6 | (0) |

International career^{‡}
| 2012 | Italy U15 | 9 | (1) |
| 2013–2014 | Italy U17 | 8 | (0) |
| 2013–2015 | Italy U18 | 4 | (0) |
| 2015 | Italy U19 | 2 | (0) |
- * Club domestic league appearances and goals as of 10 November 2024 ‡ National team caps and goals as of 15 May 2015

Fabio Della Giovanna (born 21 March 1997) is an Italian professional footballer who plays as a centre-back for Serie D club Cjarlins Muzane.

== Club career ==
=== Inter Milan ===
On 15 May 2016, Della Giovanna made his senior debut against Sassuolo as a substitute for Rodrigo Palacio in the 81st minute of a 3–1 away defeat on the last day of the Serie A season.

==== Loan to Ternana ====
On 19 August 2016, Della Giovanna and Raffaele Di Gennaro were signed by Ternana with a season-long loan deal with option to buy. On 25 October he made his debut for Ternana as a substitute replacing Giovanni Di Noia in the 81st minute of a 1–0 away defeat against Avellino. On 7 November Della Giovanna play his second match for Ternana, he was replaced by Luca Germoni in the 46th minute of a 1–0 home defeat against Benevento. Della Giovanna finish his loan to Ternana with only two appearances.

=== SPAL ===
On 30 August 2017, Della Giovanna joined newly promoted Serie A team SPAL for an undisclosed fee.

=== Imolese ===
On 17 July 2019, he joined Serie C club Imolese on a two-year contract.

=== Pro Sesto ===
On 19 July 2021, he moved to Pro Sesto.

== International career ==
With the Italy U-17 side he took part in the qualifiers of 2014 UEFA European Under-17 Championship, making three appearances, as Italy successfully went to the elite round. At the elite round, Della Giovanna made further two appearances as Italy finished in third positions, failing to qualify in the process.

== Career statistics ==
=== Club ===
As of match played 17 October 2021

Appearances and goals by club, season and competition
| Club | Season | League | | | National cup | | League cup | | Other | | Total | |
| Club | Season | Division | Apps | Goals | Apps | Goals | Apps | Goals | Apps | Goals | Apps | Goals |
|---|---|---|---|---|---|---|---|---|---|---|---|---|
| Inter Milan | 2015–16 | Serie A | 1 | 0 | 0 | 0 | — | | — | | 1 | 0 |
| Ternana (loan) | 2016–17 | Serie B | 2 | 0 | 0 | 0 | — | | — | | 2 | 0 |
| SPAL | 2017–18 | Serie A | 0 | 0 | 0 | 0 | — | | — | | 0 | 0 |
| Arezzo (loan) | 2017–18 | Serie C | 10 | 0 | 0 | 0 | — | | — | | 10 | 0 |
| Südtirol (loan) | 2018–19 | Serie C | 8 | 1 | 1 | 0 | 1 | 0 | 2 (Note: Appearance(s) in promotion playoffs) | 0 | 12 | 1 |
| Imolese | 2019–20 | Serie C | 17 | 0 | 1 | 0 | — | | 2 | 0 | 20 | 0 |
| Imolese | 2020–21 | Serie C | 8 | 1 | 0 | 0 | — | | 1 | 0 | 9 | 1 |
| Imolese | Total | | 25 | 1 | 1 | 0 | — | | 3 | 0 | 29 | 1 |
| Pro Sesto | 2021–22 | Serie C | 7 | 0 | 0 | 0 | 1 | 0 | — | | 8 | 0 |
| Career total | | | 53 | 2 | 2 | 0 | 2 | 0 | 5 | 0 | 62 | 2 |

== Honours ==
Inter Primavera

- Torneo di Viareggio: 2015
- Coppa Italia Primavera: 2015–16
