= Emmer Sewell =

American artist (1934–2022)

Emmer Sewell (1934–2022) was an African-American contemporary artist. Sewell is known for her sculptures made of found objects. Her work is included in the collection of the Metropolitan Museum of Art.

== Early life ==
Sewell was born in Perry County, Alabama in 1934, growing up on a farm near the town of Marion. She was one of fourteen children born to Patrick Sanders, a dairy employee. Her parents were strict and organized, frequently mobilizing the children to harvest crops, tend to or slaughter their cattle, or immaculately clean the house and surrounding fields. Sewell's first memories of drawing came from the rests she would take during harvests. She would sculpt and draw in the open patches of mud on her parents' property. Sewell carries her parents' habitual, ritual cleaning into her work, as she is constantly tidying, sweeping her yard, and rearranging its contents to make her charms and protective sculptures.

A performative child, Sewell excelled in school, particularly in music, performing arts, and arithmetic. Although most of her work is contained on her property, cumulatively, her oeuvre reads as a series of stages where her knowledge and spirituality perform.

== Career ==
Sewell's work undulates through her childhood home and stretches from the road to the back edges of her property. Mundane objects such as mailboxes and old refrigerators become vessels for history and Sewell's personal spirituality, which is a syncretism of southern American Christianity and West African-derived ancestor propitiation.

An X with dots in each quadrant also pervades her work. Sewell described " I put it on refrigerators and those things—symbols of God." Comparing this symbol to ancient Roman symbols that are now ubiquitous, "That is a sign of history. That sign is a great symbol of things. It’s no mean thing to it, nothing devilish in it. It is not. It is a symbol to recognize by. It is a symbol of recognized ways...Them little dots in it make it a star. Let you know you got good running. Knowledge can make you be a star You can use your knowledge and background."

Other notable assemblages include a generations-old doghouse bordering the woods, many Black Panther inspired scarecrows, which stand guard against animals in her crops and people entering her property, and shrines to ancestors or biblical tales which are assembled on tree branches.
