= Davide Costa =

Italian footballer (born 1996)

Personal information
- Date of birth: 22 March 1996 (age 30)
- Place of birth: Bassano del Grappa, Italy
- Height: 1.89 m (6 ft 2 1/2 in)
- Position: Goalkeeper

Team information
- Current team: Bassano

Youth career
- 2003–2011: Bassano Virtus
- 2011–2014: Internazionale

Senior career*
Years	Team	Apps	(Gls)
2014–2018	Internazionale	0	(0)
2015–2016	→ Bassano Virtus (loan)	3	(0)
2016–2017	→ Virtus Francavilla (loan)	2	(0)
2017	→ Vicenza (loan)	1	(0)
2017–2018	→ Gubbio (loan)	0	(0)
2018	→ Bassano Virtus (loan)	0	(0)
2018–2019	Rieti	10	(0)
2021–2022	Giorgione		
2022–	Bassano	0	(0)

International career^{‡}
2011	Italy U-16	1	(0)
- * Club domestic league appearances and goals as of 17 September 2023 ‡ National team caps and goals as of 26 May 2017

Davide Costa (born 22 March 1996) is an Italian footballer who plays for Serie D club Bassano.

== Club career ==
He made his professional debut in the Lega Pro for Bassano Virtus on 13 February 2016 in a game against Cuneo.
