= Mel Taufer =

Italian footballer

Personal information
- Full name: Melkamu Taufer
- Date of birth: 8 February 1998 (age 28)
- Place of birth: Gondar, Ethiopia
- Height: 1.75 m (5 ft 9 in)
- Position: Midfielder

Team information
- Current team: Fasil Kenema

Youth career
- –2017: Inter
- 2016–2017: → Trapani (loan)

Senior career*
Years	Team	Apps	(Gls)
2017–2018	Inter	0	(0)
2017–2018	→ Arzachena (loan)	9	(1)
2018–2019	Arzachena	14	(0)
2019–	Fasil Kenema		

International career
2012–2014	Italy U-16	12	(0)
2014	Italy U-17	6	(0)
- * Club domestic league appearances and goals as of 22:09, 11 March 2020 (UTC)

Melkamu "Mel" Taufer (born 8 February 1998) is an Ethiopian-born Italian football player. He plays for Fasil Kenema.

== Club career ==
=== Internazionale ===
==== Loan to Arzachena ====
On 18 July 2017, Taufer was signed by Serie C side Arzachena with a season-long loan deal. On 7 October, Taufer made his professional debut in Serie C for Arzachena and he scored his first professional goal in the 26th minute of a 4–1 away win over Gavorrano, he was replaced by Simone Sbarella in the 64th minute. Taufer ended his season-long loan deal with only 9 appearances, 5 as a starter, 1 goal and 1 assist, but he neven played an entire match for the club.

=== Arzachena ===
After the loan, on 17 July 2018, Taufer joined to Serie C club Arzachena with an undisclosed fee.

=== Fasil Kenema ===
After years away from Ethiopia, Taufer has returned to his hometown by signing Ethiopian Premier League club Fasil Kenema for a year. He won the league and best player of the tournament scoring 17 goals in 24 appearances.

== International career ==
Taufer represented Italy at Under-16 and Under-17 level. On 2 October 2012 he made his U-16 debut as a substitute replacing Demetrio Scopelliti in the 41st minute of a 1–0 home defeat against Turkey U-16. On 4 October 2012 he played his first entire match for Italy U-16, a 2–1 home win over Turkey U-16. On 27 August 2014, Taufer made his debut at U-17 level as a substitute replacing Alessandro Celestri in the 76th minute of a 0–0 home draw against Portugal U-17. On 29 August 2014 he played his first entire match at U-17 level, a 1–0 home win over Czech Republic U-17.

== Career statistics ==
=== Club ===
As of 13 July 2018

Club	Season	League			Cup		Europe		Other		Total	
Club	Season	League	Apps	Goals	Apps	Goals	Apps	Goals	Apps	Goals	Apps	Goals
Arzachena (loan)	2017–18	Serie C	9	1	0	0	—		—		9	1
Arzachena	2018–19	Serie C	0	0	0	0	—		—		0	0
Career total			9	1	0	0	—		—		9	1
