= Lauro Müller, Santa Catarina =

Lauro Müller
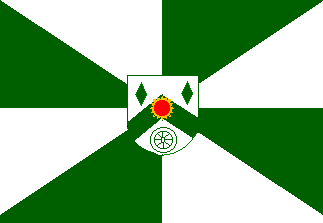
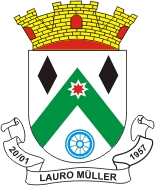
- Flag Coat of arms

- Location of Lauro Müller

- Location within Brazil
- Coordinates: 28°23′34″S 49°23′49″W
- Country: Brazil
- Region: South
- State: (Santa Catarina (state)) Santa Catarina
- Founded: December 6, 1956

Government
  - Mayor: Saionara Correa de Carvalho Bora

Area
  - Total: 270.508 km^{2} (104.444 sq mi)
- Elevation: 220 m (720 ft)

Population (2020)
  - Total: 15,313
  - Density: 49.4/km^{2} (128/sq mi)
- Time zone: UTC-3 (UTC-3)
  - Summer (DST): UTC-2 (UTC-2)
- HDI (2000): 0.800
- Website: www.lauromuller.sc.gov.br

Lauro Müller is a city in Santa Catarina, in the Southern Region of Brazil.

== History ==
Despite its German name, the city was settled by Italians at the end of the 19th century. The settlements extensive coal deposits were first exploited in 1827, however the area's economy only begun to develop after the arrival of Italian immigrants.

On September 25, 1905, the engineer Álvaro Rodovalho Marcondes do Reis proposed to give the area the name 'Lauro Müller', in appreciation of the Ministro da Viação e Obras Públicas (secretary of Industry, Transport and Public Works) Dr. Lauro Severiano Müller. Müller was an engineer and diplomat in addition to serving two terms as President of Santa Catarina.
