= Ehmer =

Ehmer is a surname. Notable people with the surname include:

- Karl Ehmer(1906–1978), German footballer
- Karl Ehmer (entrepreneur) (1909–1998), German-American businessman and philanthropist
- Max Ehmer (born 1992), German footballer
- Walter G. Ehmer (born c. 1967), American businessman
- Wilhelm Ehmer (1896–1976), German poet
