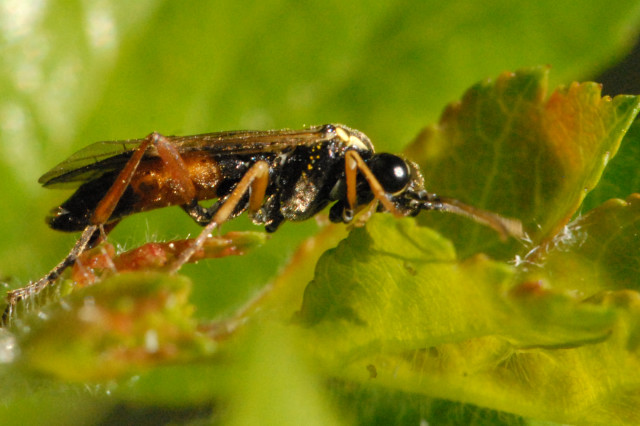
- Ametastegia equiseti

Scientific classification
- Domain: Eukaryota
- Kingdom: Animalia
- Phylum: Arthropoda
- Class: Insecta
- Order: Hymenoptera
- Suborder: Symphyta
- Family: Tenthredinidae
- Subfamily: Allantinae
- Tribe: Empriini; Rohwer 1911

Type genus
- Empria

= Empriini =

Tribe of sawflies

Empriini is a tribe of sawflies in the family Tenthredinidae.

Genera

include;

- Ametastegia Costa 1882
- Aphilodyctium Ashmead 1898
- Empria Lepeletier & Serville 1828
- Monsoma MacGillivray 1908
- Monostegia Costa 1859
- Phrontosoma MacGillivray 1908

== Bibliography ==
- Krombein, Karl V; Hurd, Paul V; Smith, David R; Burks, B D, eds. (1979). Catalog of hymenoptera in America north of Mexico. Washington DC: Smithsonian Institution Press.
- Smith, David R. Symphyta, vol. i. pp. 1–137., in Krombein et al (1979)
