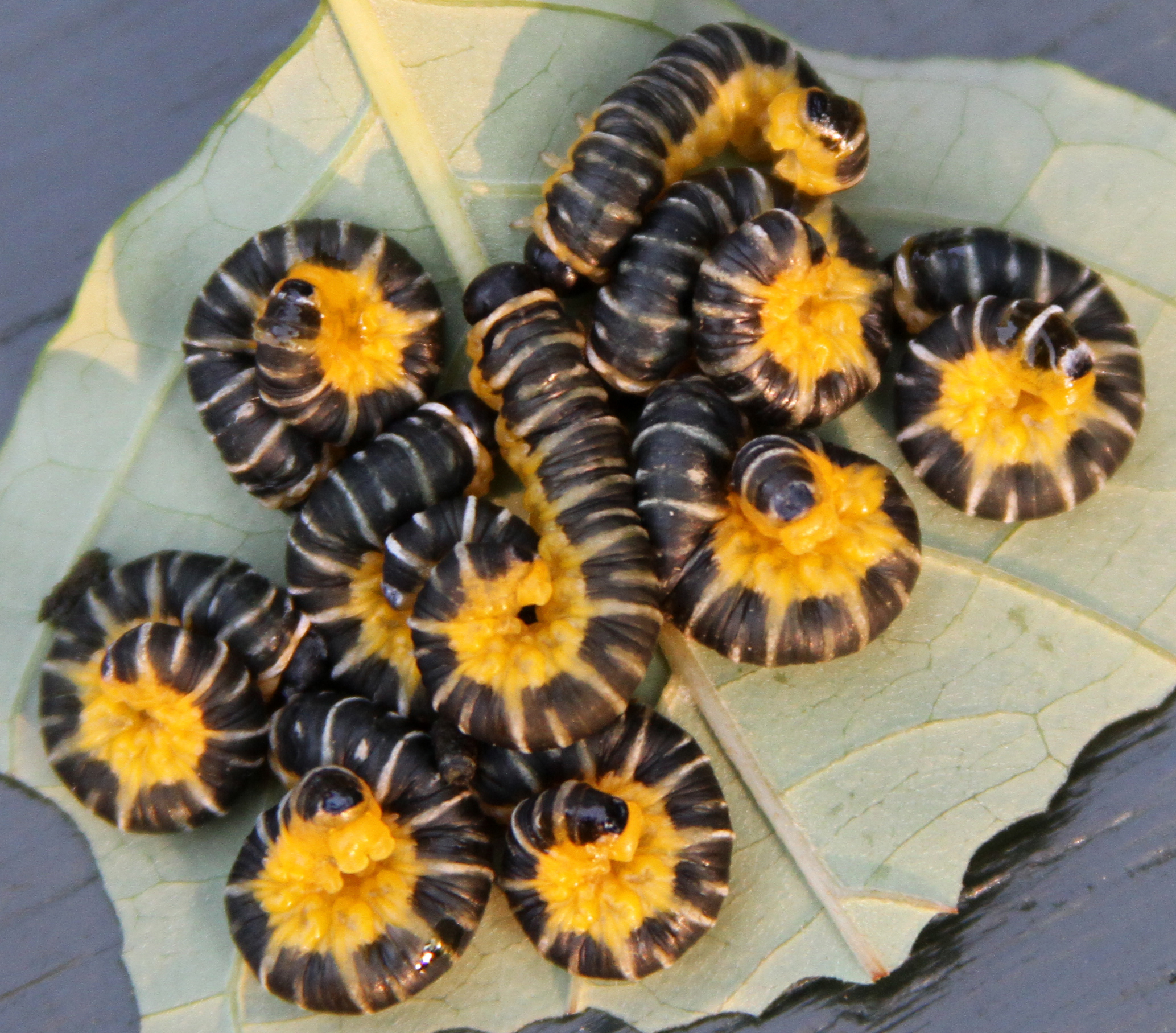
- Macremphytus tarsatus

Scientific classification
- Domain: Eukaryota
- Kingdom: Animalia
- Phylum: Arthropoda
- Class: Insecta
- Order: Hymenoptera
- Suborder: Symphyta
- Family: Tenthredinidae
- Subfamily: Allantinae
- Genus: Macremphytus; Macgillivray, 1908

= Macremphytus =

Genus of sawflies

Macremphytus is a genus of common sawflies in the family Tenthredinidae. There are at least four described species in Macremphytus.

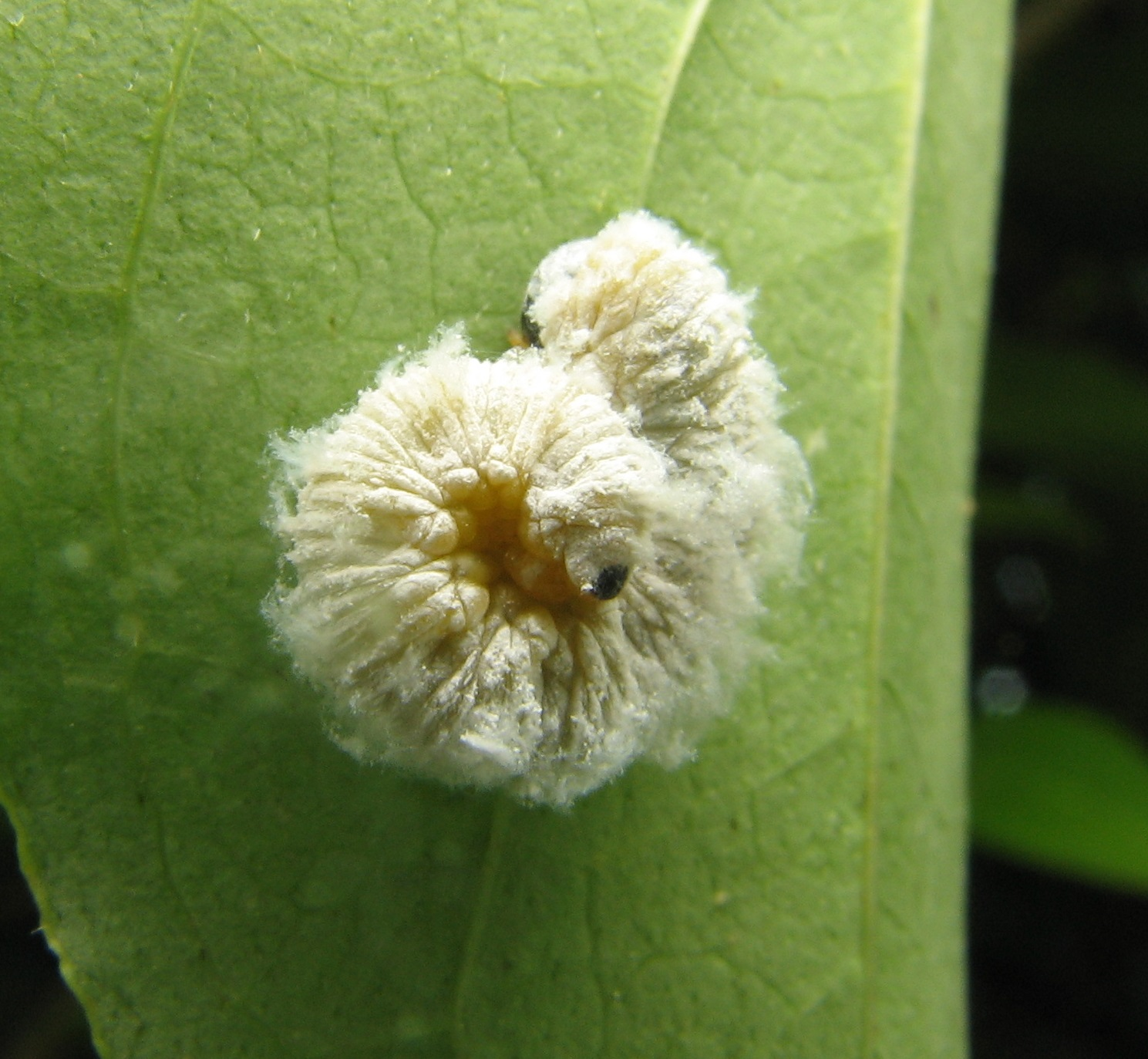
Macremphytus testaceus

== Species ==
These four species belong to the genus Macremphytus:

- Macremphytus lovetti MacGillivray, 1923
- Macremphytus semicornis (Say, 1836)
- Macremphytus tarsatus (Say, 1836) (dogwood sawfly)
- Macremphytus testaceus (Norton, 1861)
