= L. terrestris =

L. terrestris may refer to:

- Lumbricus terrestris, a worm species
- Lycosa terrestris, a spider species in the genus Lycosa
- Lysimachia terrestris, a plant species

== See also ==
- Terrestris
