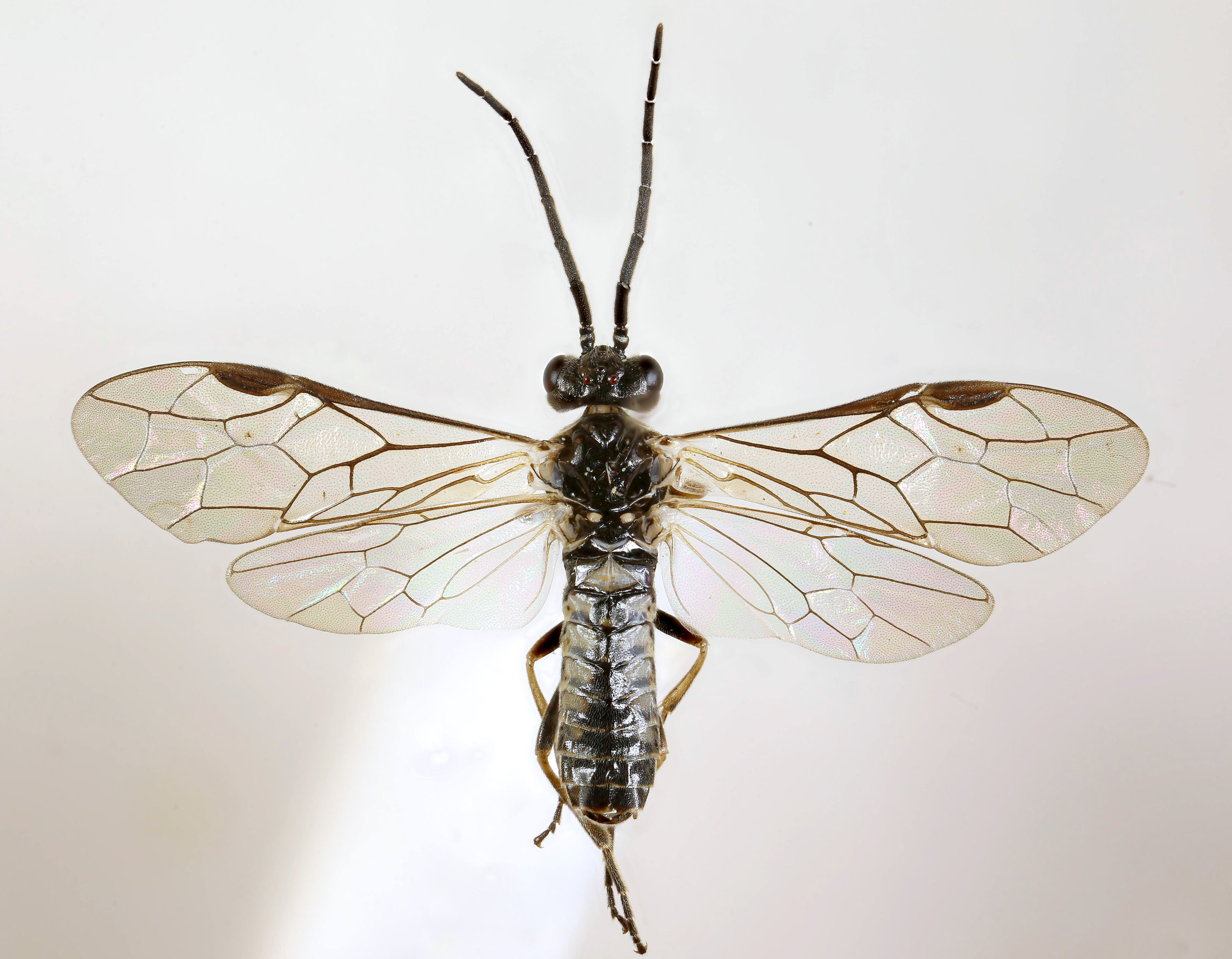
- Empria liturata male, North Wales

Scientific classification
- Domain: Eukaryota
- Kingdom: Animalia
- Phylum: Arthropoda
- Class: Insecta
- Order: Hymenoptera
- Suborder: Symphyta
- Family: Tenthredinidae
- Genus: Empria
- Species: E. liturata

Binomial name
- Empria liturata (Gmelin, 1790)

= Empria liturata =

Species of sawfly

Empria liturata is a Palearctic species of sawfly.
