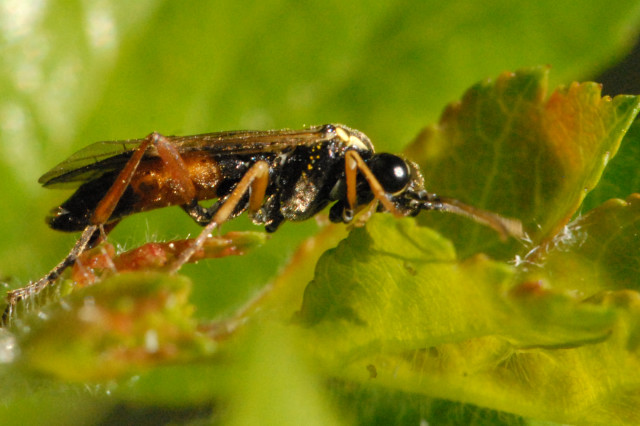
- Ametastegia equiseti

Scientific classification
- Domain: Eukaryota
- Kingdom: Animalia
- Phylum: Arthropoda
- Class: Insecta
- Order: Hymenoptera
- Suborder: Symphyta
- Family: Tenthredinidae
- Tribe: Empriini
- Genus: Ametastegia; Costa, 1882

= Ametastegia =

Genus of sawflies

Ametastegia is a genus of common sawflies in the family Tenthredinidae. There are about 16 described species in Ametastegia.

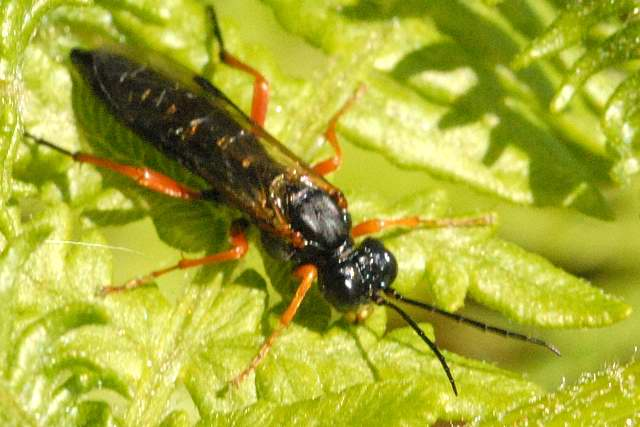
Ametastegia glabrata

== Species ==
These 16 species belong to the genus Ametastegia:

- Ametastegia albipes (Thomson, 1871)
- Ametastegia aperta (Norton, 1861)
- Ametastegia armillata (Konow, 1905)
- Ametastegia articulata (Klug, 1818)
- Ametastegia becra Smith
- Ametastegia carpini (Hartig, 1837)
- Ametastegia equiseti (Fallen, 1808)
- Ametastegia formosana (Rohwer, 1916)
- Ametastegia glabrata (Fallen) (dock sawfly)
- Ametastegia lacteilabris (Costa, 1894)
- Ametastegia pallipes (Spinola) (violet sawfly)
- Ametastegia perla (Klug, 1818)
- Ametastegia persica Khayrandish, Talebi & Blank, 2015
- Ametastegia tener (Fallén, 1808)
- Ametastegia tenera (Fallen, 1808)
- Ametastegia xenia Smith
