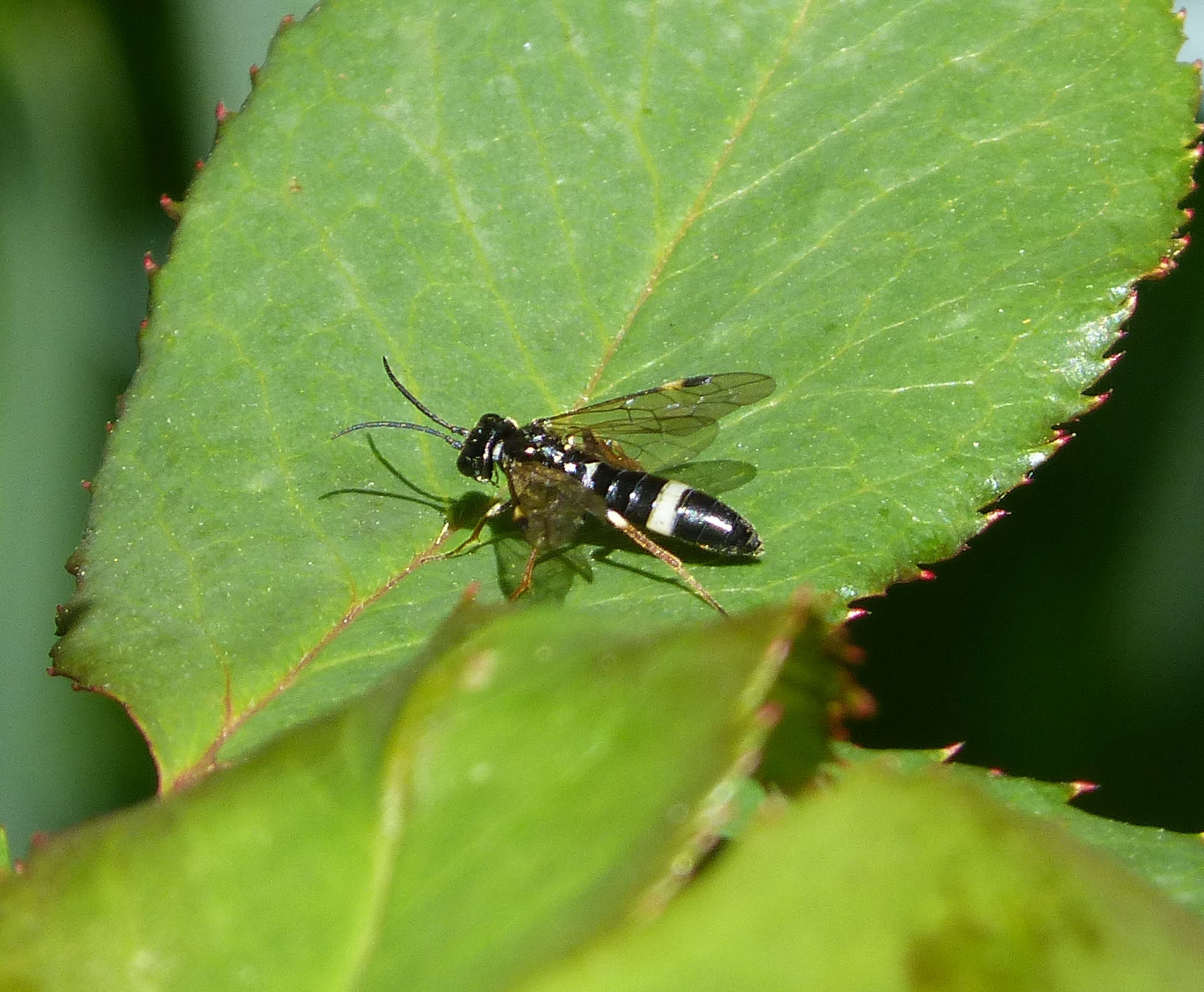

Scientific classification
- Kingdom: Animalia
- Phylum: Arthropoda
- Class: Insecta
- Order: Hymenoptera
- Suborder: Symphyta
- Family: Tenthredinidae
- Genus: Allantus
- Species: A. cinctus

Binomial name
- Allantus cinctus (Linnaeus)

= Allantus cinctus =

Species of sawfly

Allantus cinctus, known generally as the curled rose sawfly or banded rose sawfly, is a species of common sawfly in the family Tenthredinidae. It is found in Europe.
