= Adamas (sawfly) =

Scientific classification
- Kingdom: Animalia
- Phylum: Arthropoda
- Class: Insecta
- Order: Hymenoptera
- Suborder: Symphyta
- Family: Tenthredinidae
- Subfamily: Allantinae
- Genus: Adamas; Malaise, 1945

Synonyms
- Dinax Konow, 1897 (Preocc.)

Genus of sawflies

Adamas is a genus of sawflies belonging to the family Tenthredinidae. It is sometimes referred to in the literature under the name Dinax, but this name is a junior homonym of a name validly published in 1848; claims that the 1848 name was not validly published (e.g.,) have been subsequently refuted.

== Species ==
- Adamas caudatus Nie & Wei, 2004
- Adamas ermak Zhelochovtsev, 1968
- Adamas jakowleffi (Konow, 1897)
- Adamas lui Nie & Wei, 2004
- Adamas parallelus Nie & Wei, 2004
- Adamas xui Nie & Wei, 2004
