= Emphytopsis =

Scientific classification
- Kingdom: Animalia
- Phylum: Arthropoda
- Class: Insecta
- Order: Hymenoptera
- Suborder: Symphyta
- Family: Tenthredinidae
- Subfamily: Allantinae
- Tribe: Allantini
- Genus: Emphytopsis; Wei & Nie, 1998

Genus of sawflies

Emphytopsis is a genus of sawflies in the family Tenthredinidae.

== Species ==
- Emphytopsis flatoserrula Wei, 2011
- Emphytopsis lii Wei, 2011
- Emphytopsis nigricornis Wei & Xu, 2011
- Emphytopsis nigromaculata (Takeuchi, 1952)
- Emphytopsis punctata Wei & Nie, 1998
- Emphytopsis quadrata Wei & Xu, 2011
- Emphytopsis shinoharai Wei & Niu, 2011
- Emphytopsis unimaculata Wei, 2011
- Emphytopsis zhongi Wei & Niu, 2011
