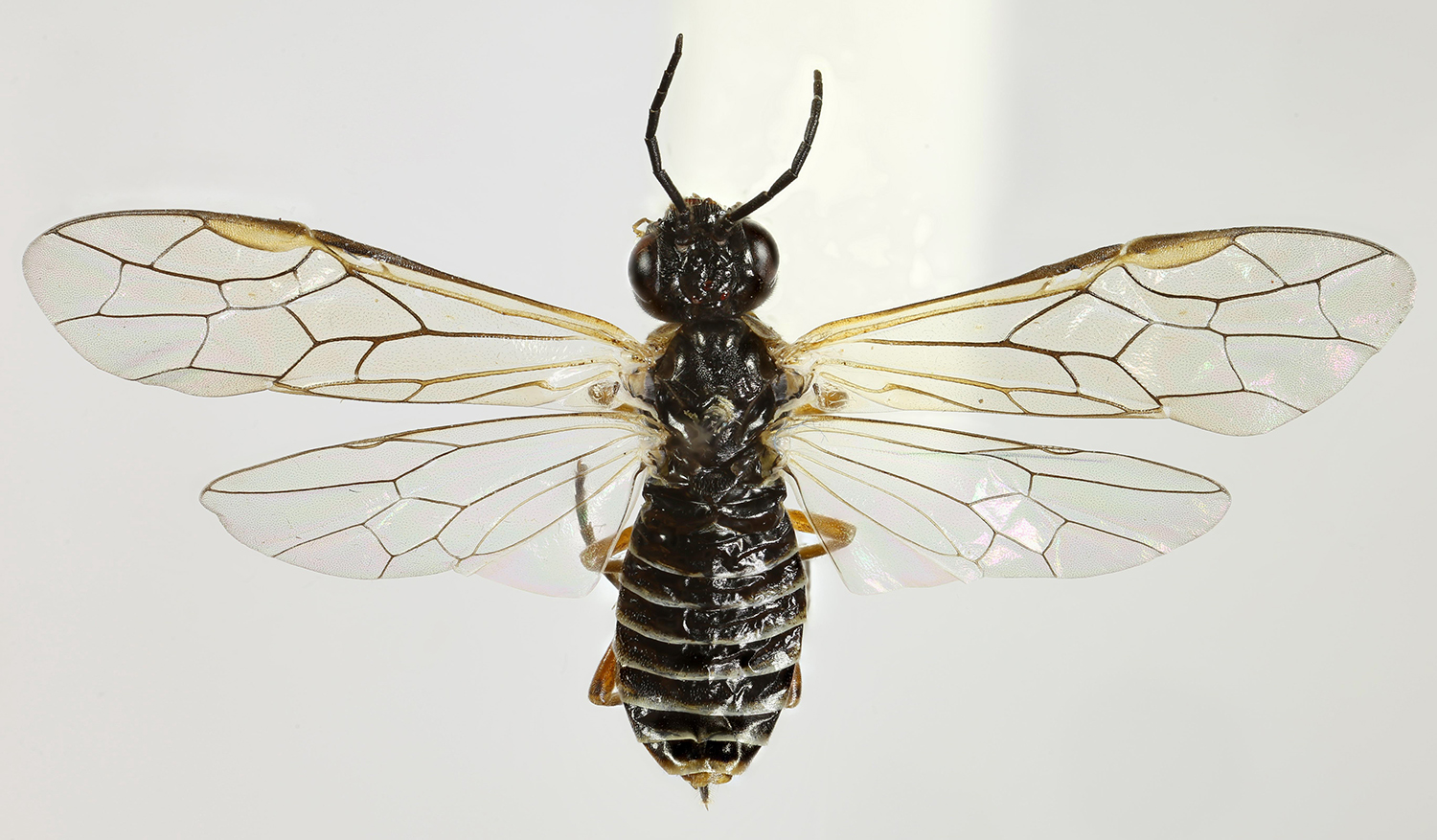
- Monsoma pulveratum

Scientific classification
- Domain: Eukaryota
- Kingdom: Animalia
- Phylum: Arthropoda
- Class: Insecta
- Order: Hymenoptera
- Suborder: Symphyta
- Family: Tenthredinidae
- Tribe: Empriini
- Genus: Monsoma; MacGillivray, 1908

Type species
- Poecilostoma inferentia Norton, 1868

Synonyms
- Monosoma Viereck, 1910 (unjustified emendation)

= Monsoma =

Genus of sawflies

Monsoma is a genus of common sawflies in the family Tenthredinidae. There are at least two described species in Monsoma.

== Species ==
Species include:

- Monsoma pallipes Matsumura, 1912^{g}
- Monsoma pulveratum (Retzius, 1783)^{g b} (green alder sawfly)

Data sources: i = ITIS, c = Catalogue of Life, g = GBIF, b = Bugguide.net
