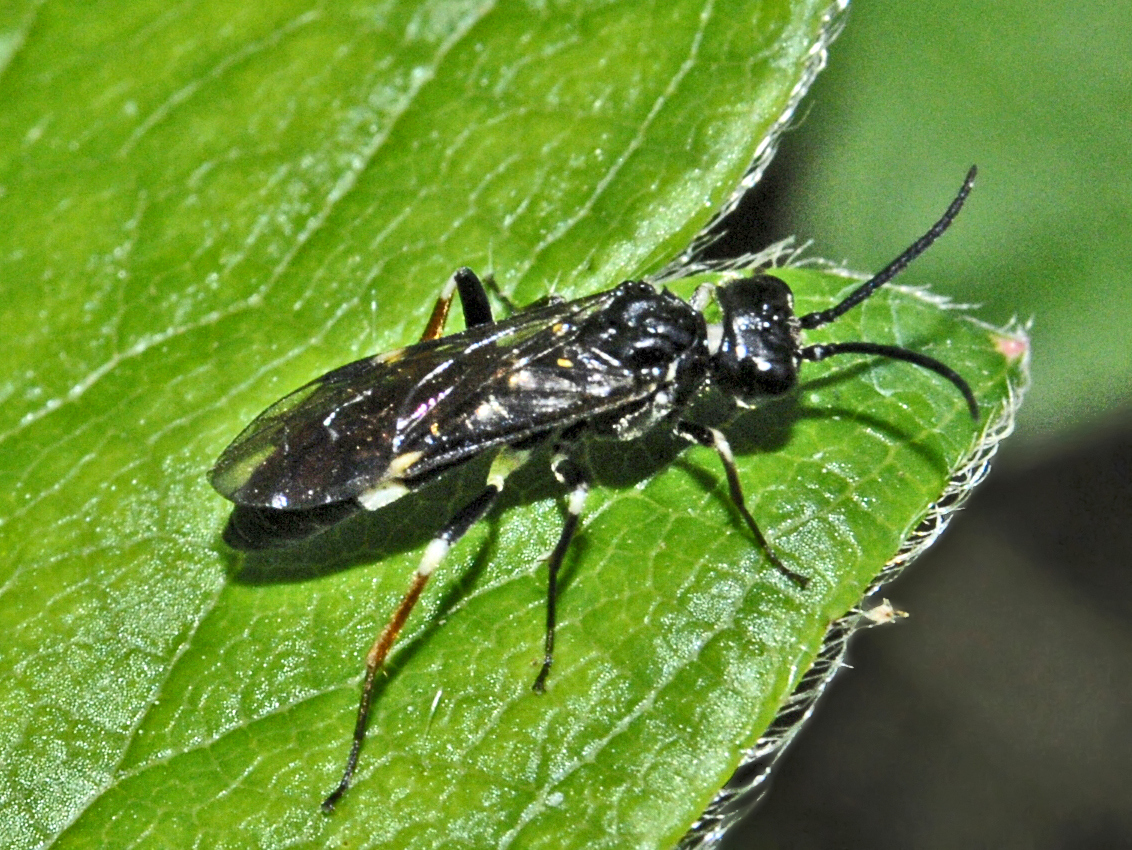
- Allantus species

Scientific classification
- Domain: Eukaryota
- Kingdom: Animalia
- Phylum: Arthropoda
- Class: Insecta
- Order: Hymenoptera
- Suborder: Symphyta
- Family: Tenthredinidae
- Subfamily: Allantinae
- Tribe: Allantini
- Genus: Allantus; Panzer, 1801

Synonyms
- Emphytus Klug, 1813

= Allantus =

Genus of sawflies

Allantus is a genus of sawflies of the family Tenthredinidae.

== List of species ==
Species within this genus include:

- Allantus balteatus (Klug, 1814)
- Allantus basalis (Klug, 1814)
- Allantus calceatus (Klug, 1814)
- Allantus calliblepharus (Konow, 1900)
- Allantus cinctus (Linnaeus, 1758) - Curled Rose Sawfly
- Allantus cingillipes (Kontuniemi, 1947)
- Allantus cingillum (Klug, 1814)
- Allantus cingulatus (Scopoli, 1763)
- Allantus coryli (Stritt, 1937)
- Allantus coxalis (Klug, 1814)
- Allantus didymus (Klug, 1818)
- Allantus laticinctus (Serville, 1823)
- Allantus melanarius (Klug, 1814)
- Allantus rufocinctus (Retzius, 1783)
- Allantus togatus Panzer, 1801
- Allantus truncatus (Klug, 1814)
- Allantus viennensis (Schrank, 1781)
- Allantus xanthopygus (Klug, 1818)
