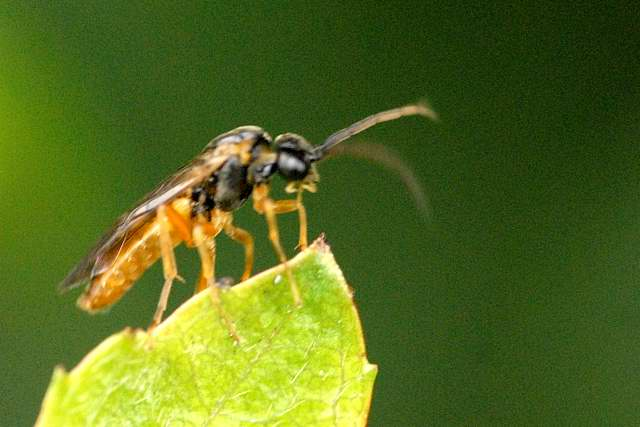
- Monostegia abdominalis

Scientific classification
- Kingdom: Animalia
- Phylum: Arthropoda
- Clade: Pancrustacea
- Class: Insecta
- Order: Hymenoptera
- Suborder: Symphyta
- Family: Tenthredinidae
- Subfamily: Allantinae
- Tribe: Empriini
- Genus: Monostegia; O. G. Costa, 1859

Species
- Monostegia abdominalis; Monostegia analis; Monostegia cingula; Monostegia nigra

= Monostegia =

Genus of sawflies

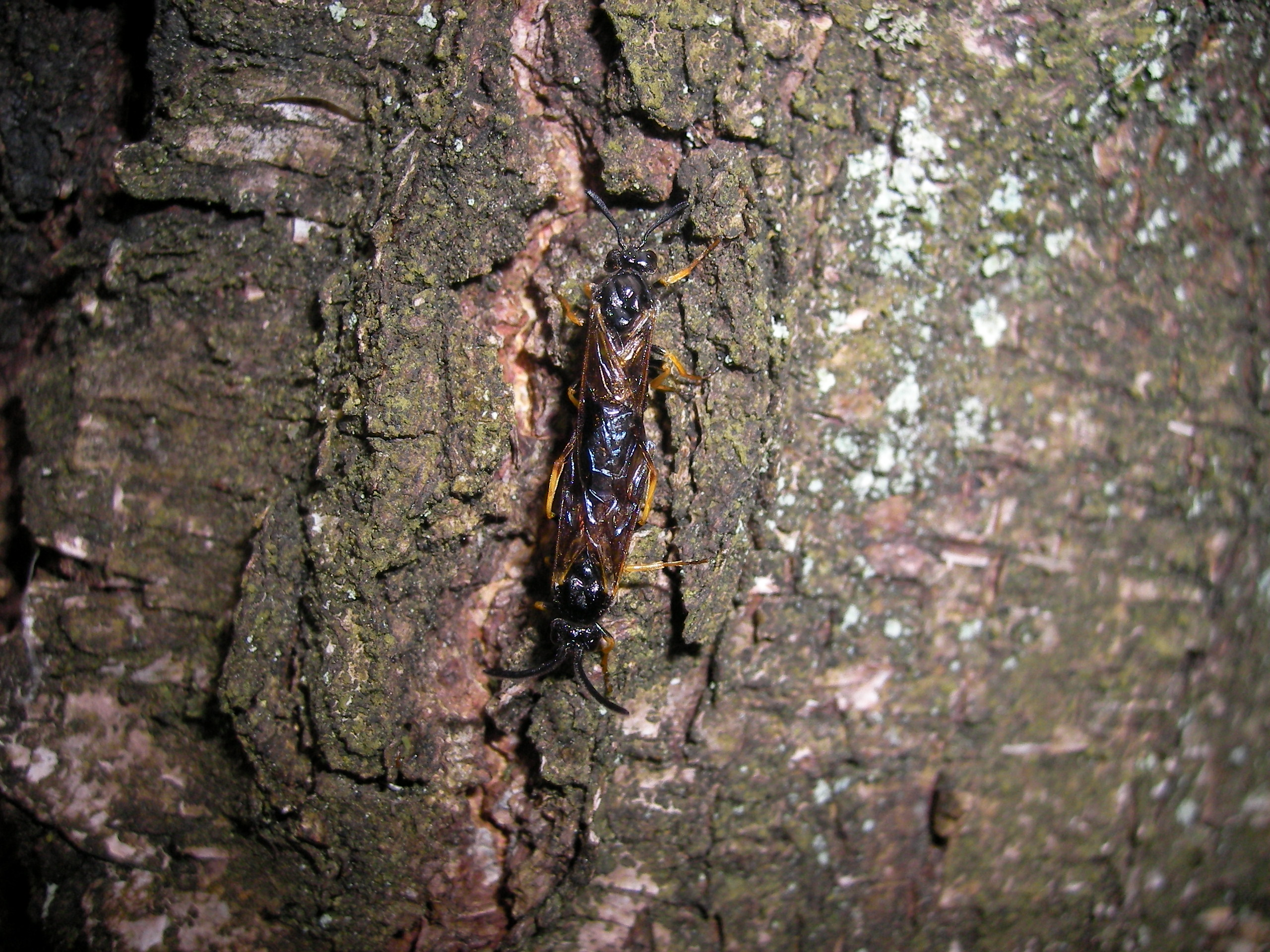
Adult Monostegia abdominalis

Monostegia is a genus of sawfly. The authority is based on the description by Achille Costa and Oronzio Costa, although earlier work grants this to Fabricius 1798., though the most common species, M. abdominalis, bears the authority of Fabricius.

== Description ==
Adults: Head and thorax are black, with some yellow parts including mouthparts. Legs and abdomen mainly yellow, wings suffused with brown. Eggs: Smooth, white and oblong measuring 1 mm by 4 mm. Larvae: Caterpillar-like, growing from 2–4 mm to 16–21 mm. Pupae: Shorter and fatter measuring 8 mm in length, and become increasingly melanized.

== Taxonomy ==
Species often include only M. abdominalis, but some authorities describe up to four species, namely;

- Monostegia abdominalis A. Costa 1859 (Fabricius 1798) – tiny yellow sawfly
- Monostegia analis Konow 1887
- Monostegia cingula Konow 1891
- Monostegia nigra Konow 1896

== Distribution ==
Distribution is holarctic, from Europe to Asia Minor and the Caucasus in the south, through to Siberia. Though it was only introduced to North America from Europe in the 1950s, where it naturalised, its range continues to expand. In 1979 its distribution in North America was from Quebec to New Jersey, and west to Ontario and Ohio, but in 2016 it was also detected as far west as Washington in the United States and from Alberta to the Maritimes in Canada.

== Economic importance ==
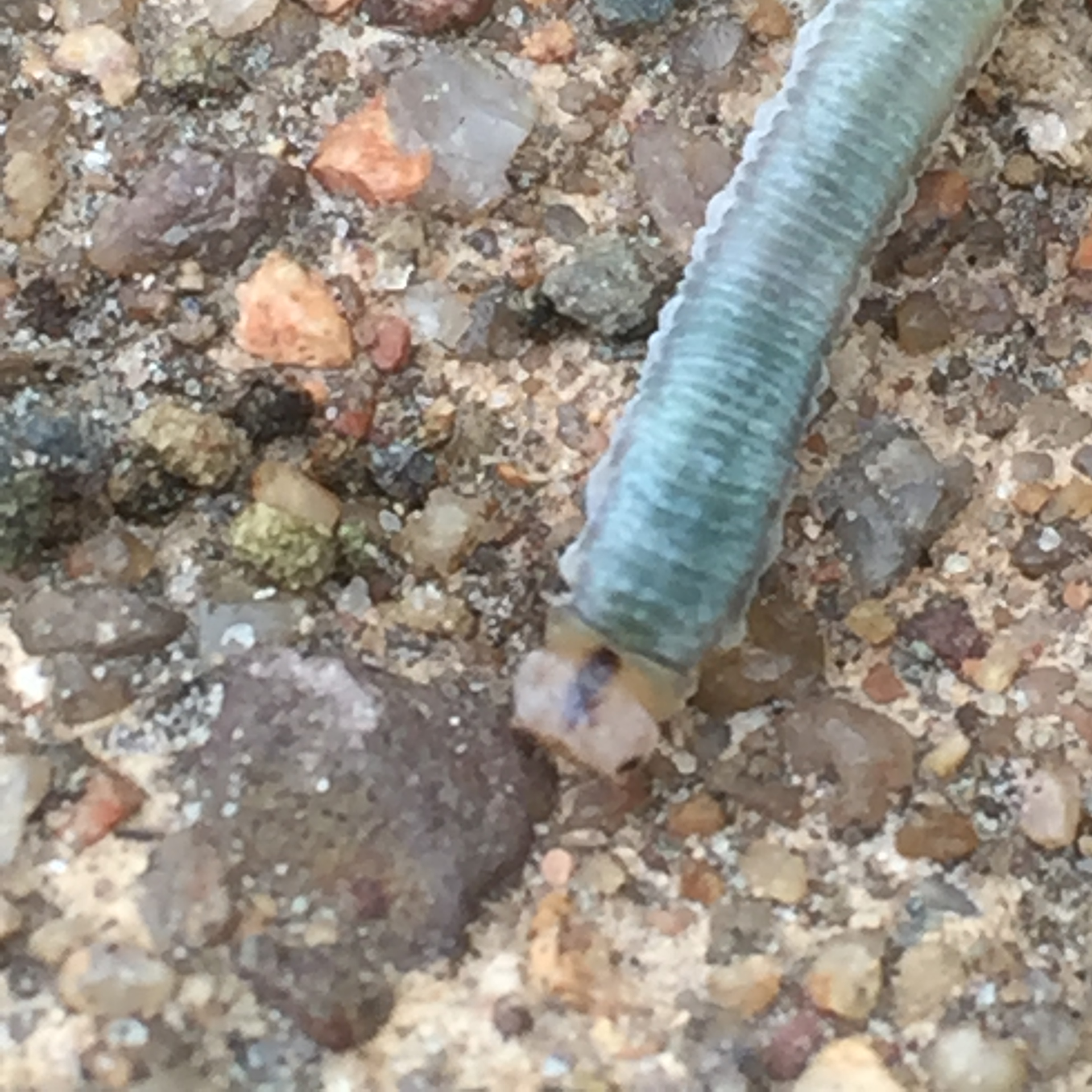
Head of larva

Sawflies are folivore phytophages (plant eating). Monostegia's economic importance lies in the destructive habits of its caterpillar-like larvae, which feed on the leaves of plants of the family Primulaceae, principally Lysimachia (such as yellow loosestrife, (Lysimachia terrestris)), and Anagallis (pimpernel). Original reports in North America involved Lysimachia nummularia as the host plant, but L. terrestris was identified in the 1960s.

== Life cycle ==
Two (bivoltine) to three (multivoltine) generations per year occur, depending on the length of the summer season, with some larvae over wintering, otherwise the larvae mature in July, emerging from the soil as adults in August. Larvae that winter in the soil pupate in the spring to emerge in June.

Adults are thelyotokous, females being produced from unfertilised eggs, and males are rare. The emerging female alights the underside of leaves at the top of the host plant, and contain 30–70 eggs, which they deposit over the space of about a week, and live for about a further week. the female penetrates the leaf with her ovipositor, depositing the eggs into the cavity, usually two at a time, moving from the distal leaf towards the stem, forming an egg cluster of between 6 and 16 eggs.

The eggs are laid on the leaves of the host plant, and the immature larvae ( first instar) remain with the clusters of eggs for a day before dispersing and feeding on the underside of the leaves. One larva can consume a whole plant, migrating to a new plant after total defoliation. The mature larva (sixth instar) stops feeding and drops to the soil where it burrows and pupates.

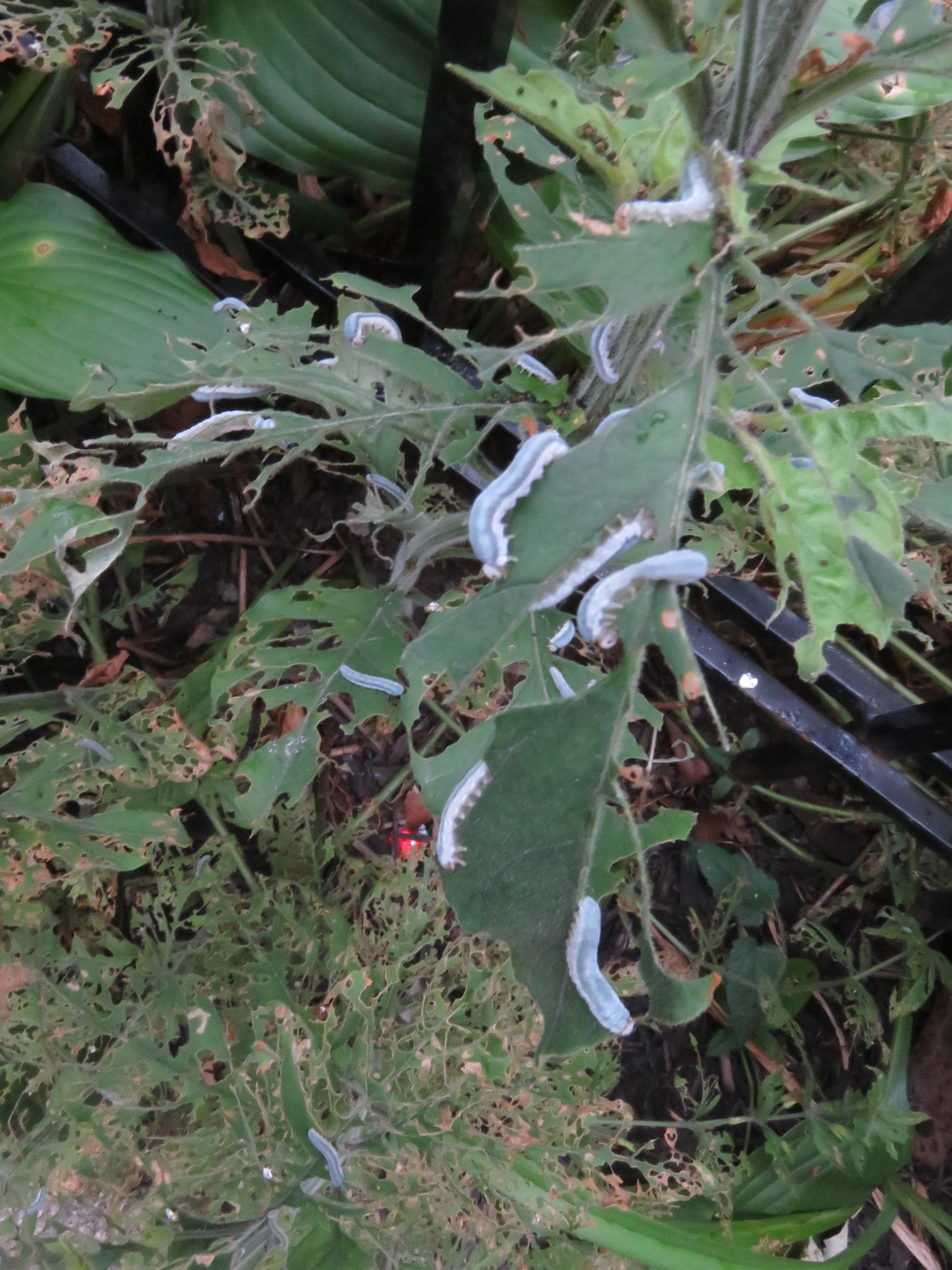
Larvae feeding on Lysimachia terrestris leaves

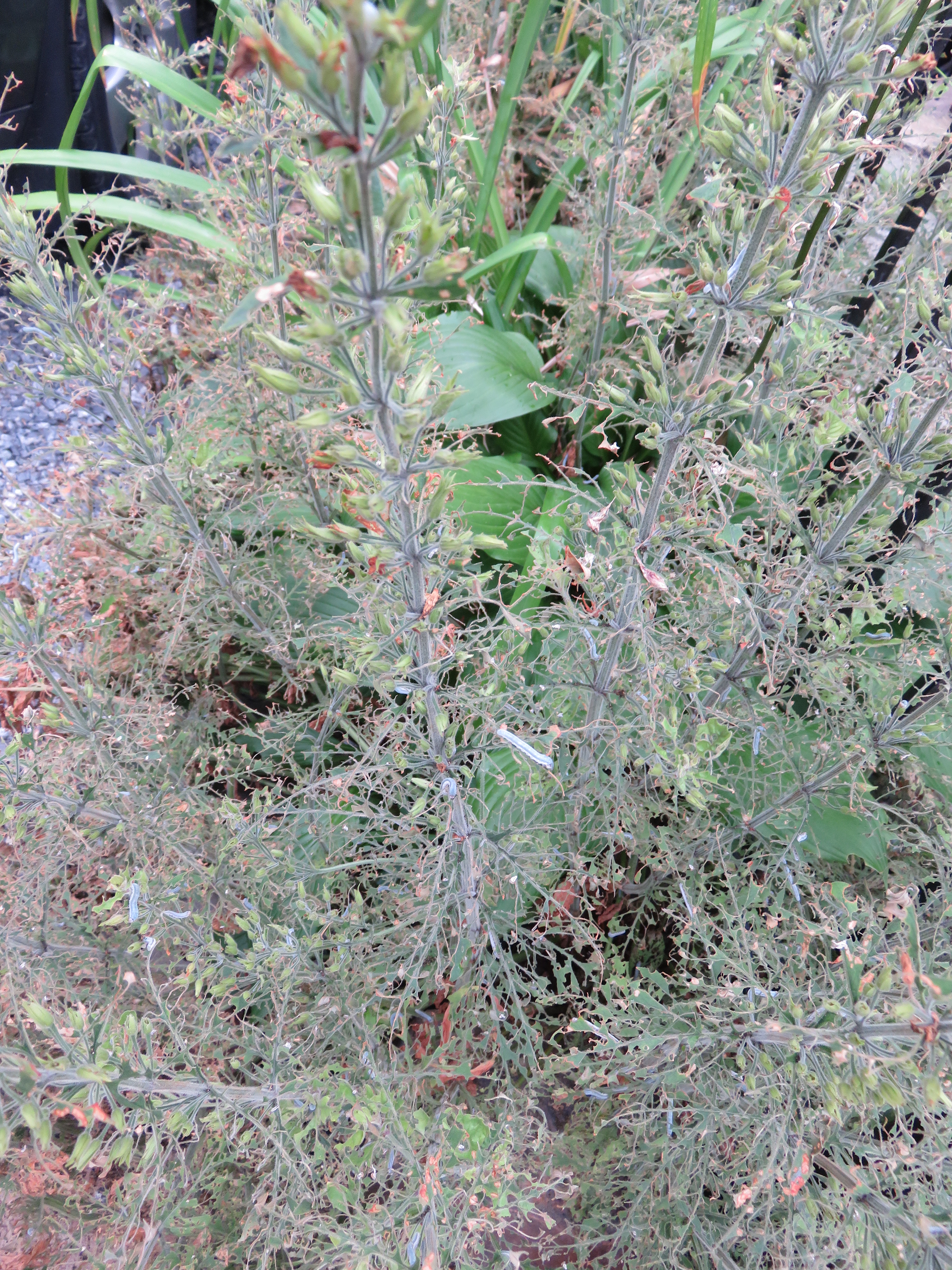
Leaves skeletonized by larvae

== Bibliography ==
- Asaro, Christopher (11 August 2008). Sawflies (Hymenoptera: Symphyta). Springer. pp. 3250–3252. ISBN 978-1-4020-6242-1., in Capinera (2008)
- Benson, R.B. (5 September 1952). Handbooks for the identification of British insects: VI Hymenoptera 2 Symphyta Section (b) (PDF). Royal Entomological Society of London. p. 85. Archived from the original (PDF) on 2015-09-24.
- Benson, Robert B (1962). "Holarctic sawflies (Hymenoptera: Symphyta)". Bulletin of the British Museum (Natural History). 12 (8): 390. doi:10.5962/bhl.part.5879.
- Blank, S.M.; Schmidt, S.; Taeger, A., eds. (2006). Recent sawfly research synthesis and prospects. Keltern: Goecke und Evers. ISBN 3-937783-19-9.
- Boevé, Jean-Luc (11 August 2008). Sawflies (Hymenoptera: Tenthredinidae). Springer. pp. 3252–3257. ISBN 978-1-4020-6242-1., in Capinera (2008)
- Capinera, John L., ed. (2008). Encyclopedia of Entomology (2nd ed.). Dordrecht: Springer. ISBN 978-1-4020-6242-1.
- Costa, Oronzio Gabriele (1859). Fauna del regno di Napoli. Parte IIIa, Imenotteri, Tenthredinidea. Naples: Azzolino.
- Blank, S.M.; Taeger, A. (1998). "Comments on the taxonomy of Symphyta (Hymenoptera)". In Taeger, A.; Blank, S. M. (eds.). Pflanzenwespen Deutschlands (Hymenoptera, Symphyta) Kommentierte Bestandsaufname. Deutsches Entomologisches Institut, Goecke& Evers, Keltern. pp. 141–174.
- Goulet, Henri; Huber, John T., eds. (1993). Hymenoptera of the world: An identification guide to families (PDF). Ottawa: Agriculture Canada. ISBN 0-660-14933-8. Archived from the original (PDF) on 2016-03-05.
- Krombein, Karl V; Hurd, Paul V; Smith, David R; Burks, B D, eds. (1979). Catalog of hymenoptera in America north of Mexico. Washington DC: Smithsonian Institution Press.
- Liston, Andrew; Knight, Guy; Sheppard, David; Broad, Gavin; Livermore, Laurence (29 August 2014). "Checklist of British and Irish Hymenoptera - Sawflies, 'Symphyta'". Biodiversity Data Journal. 2 (2) e1168. doi:10.3897/BDJ.2.e1168. PMC 4152835. PMID 25197241.
- Looney, Chris; Smith, David R; Collman, Sharon J.; Langor, David W.; Peterson, Merrill A. (28 April 2016). "Sawflies (Hymenoptera, Symphyta) newly recorded from Washington State". Journal of Hymenoptera Research. 49: 129–159. doi:10.3897/JHR.49.7104.
- Price, Peter W. (April 1970). "A loosestrife sawfly, Monostegia abdominalis (Hymenoptera: Tenthredinidae)". The Canadian Entomologist. 102 (4): 491–495. doi:10.4039/Ent102491-4. S2CID 85214806.
- Skvarla, Michael; Smith, David; Fisher, Danielle; Dowling, Ashley (9 May 2016). "Terrestrial arthropods of Steel Creek, Buffalo National River, Arkansas. II. Sawflies (Insecta: Hymenoptera: "Symphyta")". Biodiversity Data Journal. 4 (4) e8830. doi:10.3897/BDJ.4.e8830. PMC 4867044. PMID 27222635.
- Smith, David R. Symphyta, vol. i. pp. 1–137., in Krombein et al (1979)
- Smith, David R (June 1979b). Nearctic sawflies IV. Allantinae: Adults and larvae (Hymenoptera: Tenthredinidae) (Technical Bulletin 1595). Washington: US Department of Agriculture.
- Taeger, Andreas; Blank, Stephan M; Liston, Andrew D. European Sawflies (Hymenoptera: Symphyta) - A Species Checklist for the Countries. pp. 399–504., in Blank, Schmidt & Taeger (2006)

=== Websites ===
- Blank, S.M.; Groll, E.K.; Liston, A.D.; Prous, M.; Taeger, A. (2012). "ECatSym - Electronic World Catalog of Symphyta (Insecta, Hymenoptera). Program version 4.0 beta, data version 39". Müncheberg: Digital Entomological Information.
- "Monostegia". Dyntaxa: Swedish taxonomic database. Swedish University of Agricultural Sciences. 2016.
- "Monostegia A. Costa, 1859". Fauna Europaea. 2015.
- Blank, Stephan; Taeger, Andreas. "Monostegia". Fauna Europaea (Berlin). Berlin: Museum für Naturkunde.
- "Monostegia". BugGuide. Department of Entomology, Iowa State University. 2016.
