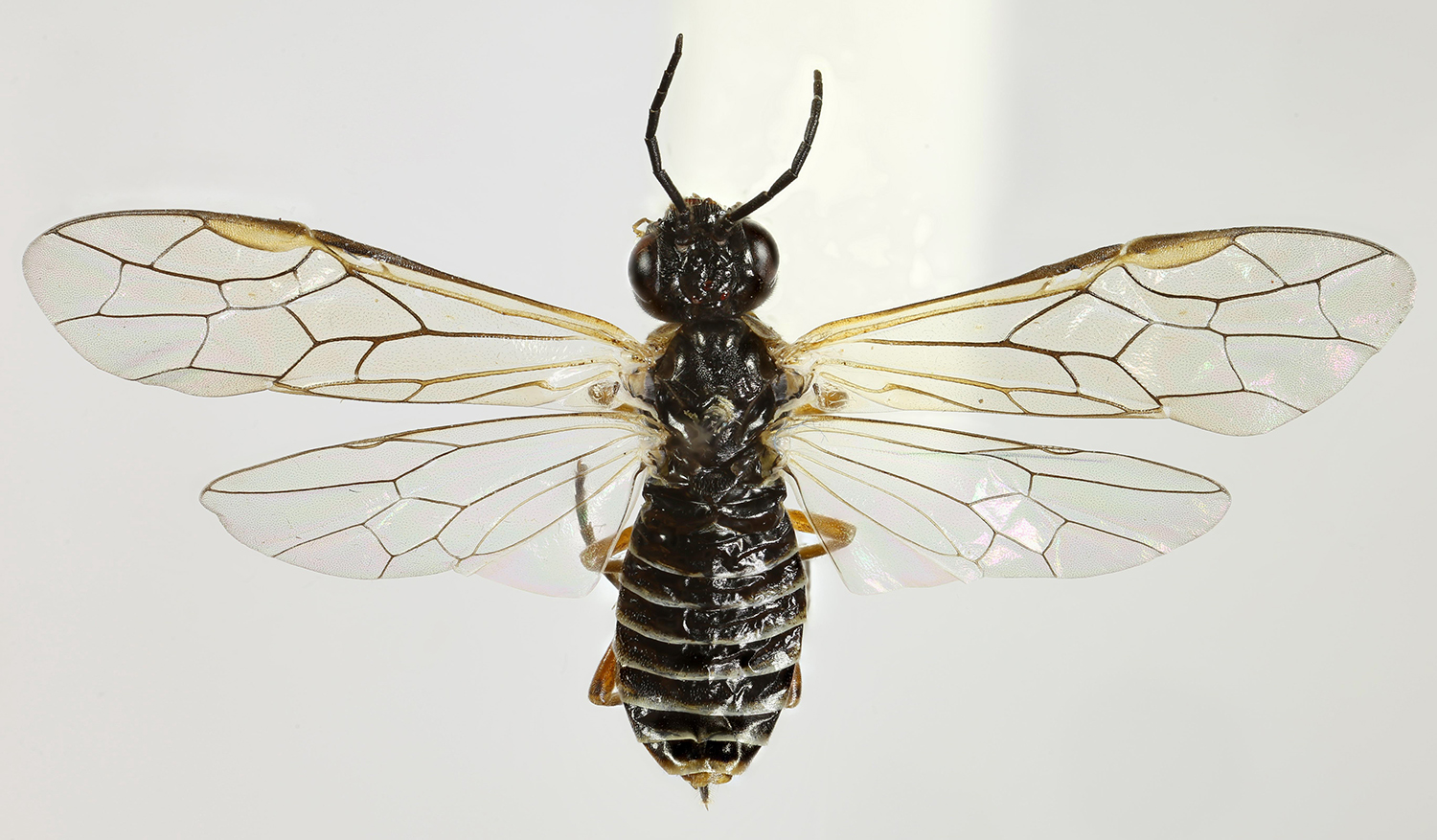

Scientific classification
- Kingdom: Animalia
- Phylum: Arthropoda
- Clade: Pancrustacea
- Class: Insecta
- Order: Hymenoptera
- Suborder: Symphyta
- Family: Tenthredinidae
- Genus: Monsoma
- Species: M. pulveratum

Binomial name
- Monsoma pulveratum (Retzius, 1783)

= Monsoma pulveratum =

Species of sawfly

Monsoma pulveratum, the green alder sawfly, is a species of common sawfly in the family Tenthredinidae. It is a European species that has been accidentally introduced in North America.
