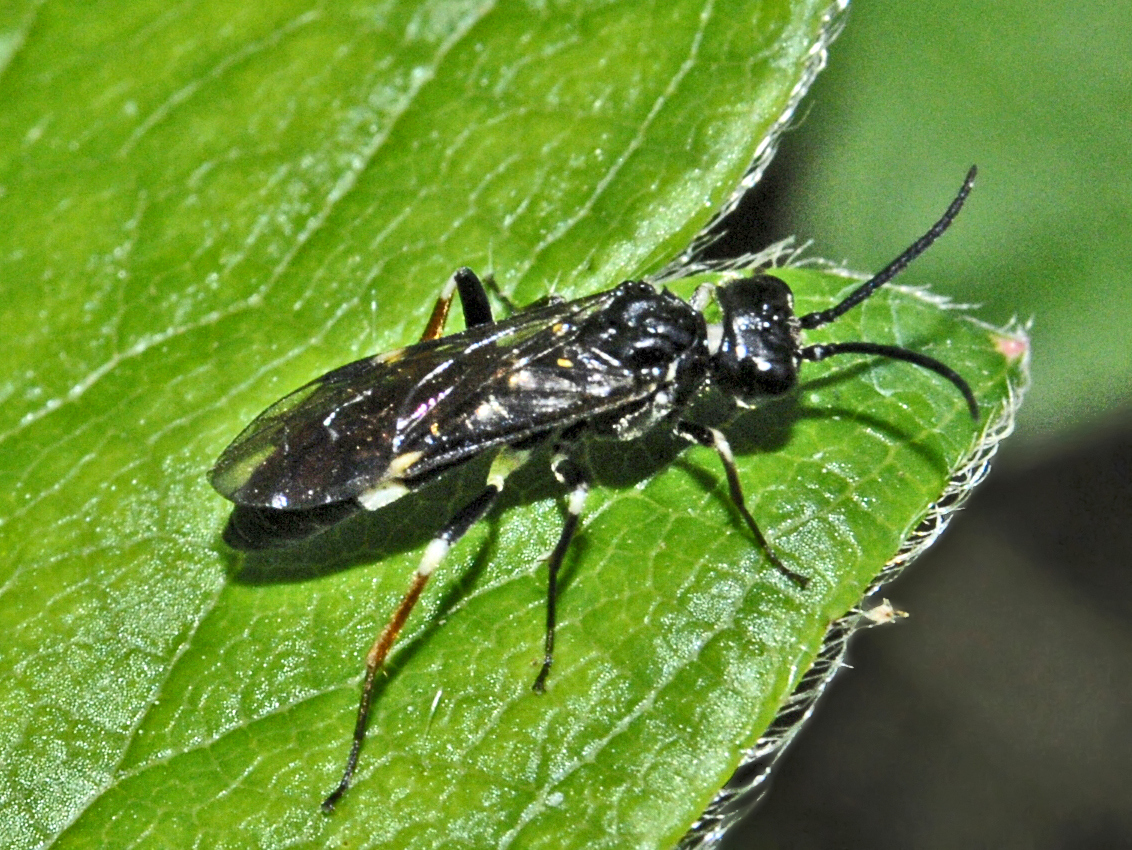
- Allantus species

Scientific classification
- Kingdom: Animalia
- Phylum: Arthropoda
- Class: Insecta
- Order: Hymenoptera
- Suborder: Symphyta
- Family: Tenthredinidae
- Subfamily: Allantinae; Rohwer, 1911

Tribes
- Adamasini; Allantini; Athaliini; Caliroini; Empriini; Eriocampini

= Allantinae =

Subfamily of sawflies

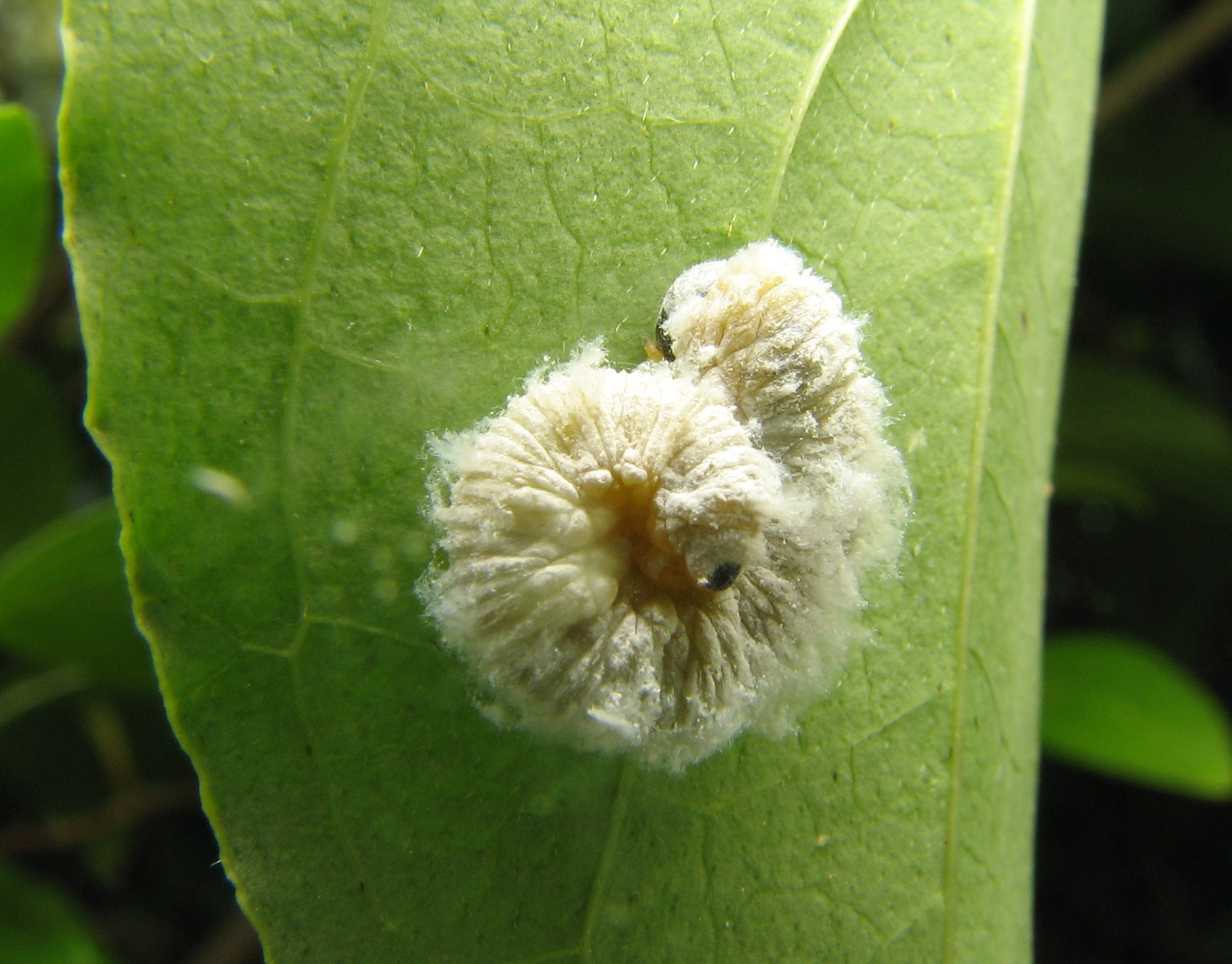
Macremphytus testaceus (Allantini) larva on dogwood

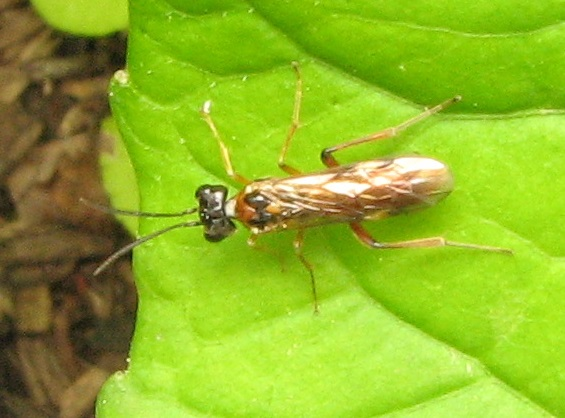
Taxonus pallipes (Allantini)

Allantinae is a subfamily of sawflies in the family Tenthredinidae, and the largest subfamily of that family, with about 110 genera. The subfamily is considered to consist of five to six tribes, and are medium to large sawflies.

== Economic importance ==
Host plants include strawberries, raspberries, roses, violets, dogwood, and loosestrife. Larvae often pupate in fruit or wood.

Monostegia abdominalis has larvae that feed on Primulaceae, and was introduced into Canada in about 1965 and is a major pest of Yellow Loosestrife (Lysimachia terrestris).

== Taxonomy ==
Tribes (type genera) select genera;

- Adamasini (Adamas Malaise, 1945)
- Allantini Rohwer, 1911 (Allantus Panzer 1801) Emphytopsis Wie & Nie, 1998
- Athaliini
- Caliroini Benson, 1938 (Caliroa Costa, 1859)
- Empriini Rohwer, 1911 (Empria Lepeletier & Serville 1828) Monostegia Costa, 1859
- Eriocampini Rohwer, 1911 (Eriocampa Hartig 1837)

== Bibliography ==
- Liston, Andrew; Knight, Guy; Sheppard, David; Broad, Gavin; Livermore, Laurence (29 August 2014). "Checklist of British and Irish Hymenoptera - Sawflies, 'Symphyta'". Biodiversity Data Journal. 2 (2) e1168. doi:10.3897/BDJ.2.e1168. PMC 4152835. PMID 25197241.
- Price, Peter W. (April 1970). "A loosestrife sawfly, Monostegia abdominalis (Hymenoptera: Tenthredinidae)". The Canadian Entomologist. 102 (4): 491–495. doi:10.4039/Ent102491-4. S2CID 85214806.
- Smith, David R (June 1979). Nearctic sawflies IV. Allantinae: Adults and larvae (Hymenoptera: Tenthredinidae) (Technical Bulletin 1595). Washington: US Department of Agriculture.
