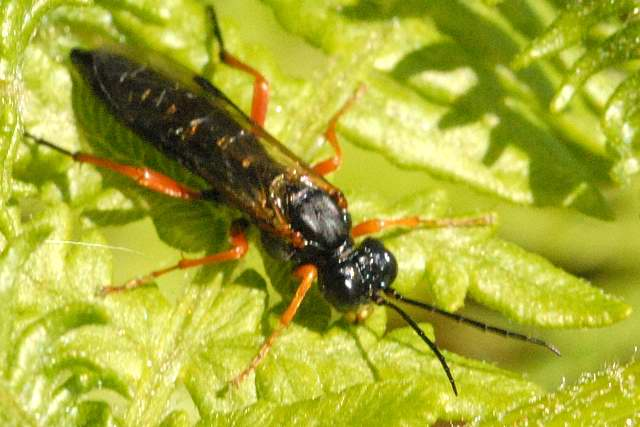

Scientific classification
- Domain: Eukaryota
- Kingdom: Animalia
- Phylum: Arthropoda
- Class: Insecta
- Order: Hymenoptera
- Suborder: Symphyta
- Family: Tenthredinidae
- Genus: Ametastegia
- Species: A. glabrata

Binomial name
- Ametastegia glabrata (Fallen)

= Ametastegia glabrata =

Species of sawfly

Ametastegia glabrata, known generally as the dock sawfly or dock false-worm, is a species of common sawfly in the family Tenthredinidae. It is found in Europe.
