= Ametastegia pallipes =

Scientific classification
- Domain: Eukaryota
- Kingdom: Animalia
- Phylum: Arthropoda
- Class: Insecta
- Order: Hymenoptera
- Suborder: Symphyta
- Family: Tenthredinidae
- Genus: Ametastegia
- Species: A. pallipes

Binomial name
- Ametastegia pallipes (Spinola)

Species of sawfly

Ametastegia pallipes, the violet sawfly, is a species of common sawfly in the family Tenthredinidae. It is found in Europe.
