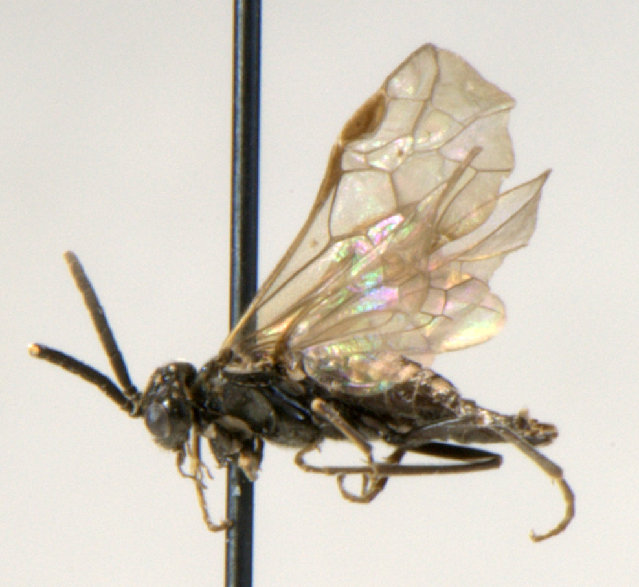
- Empria ignota

Scientific classification
- Kingdom: Animalia
- Phylum: Arthropoda
- Class: Insecta
- Order: Hymenoptera
- Suborder: Symphyta
- Family: Tenthredinidae
- Subfamily: Allantinae
- Genus: Empria; Lepeletier & Serville, 1828

Synonyms
- List: Leucempria Enslin, 1913; Parataxonus MacGillivray, 1908; Poecilostoma Thomson, 1870; Poecilostomidea Ashmead, 1898; Prosecris Gistel, 1848; Tetraneura Konow, 1905; Tetratneura Ashmead, 1898; Triempria Enslin, 1914

= Empria =

Genus of sawflies

Empria is a genus of sawflies belonging to the family Tenthredinidae.

== Species ==
The following species are recognised in the genus Empria:

- Dolerus oligocaenicus (Meunier, 1923)
- Empria alboscutellata (Konow, 1894)
- Empria alector Benson, 1938
- Empria alpina Benson, 1938
- Empria archangelskii Dovnar-Zapolskij, 1929
- Empria aridicola Macek & Prous, 2019
- Empria basalis Lindqvist, 1968
- Empria camtschatica Forsius, 1928
- Empria candidata (Fallén, 1808)
- Empria coryli
- Empria erichsoni Liston, 1995
- Empria excisa (Thomson, 1871)
- Empria fletcheri (Cameron, 1878)
- Empria formosana Prous & Heidemaa, 2012
- Empria granatensis Lacourt, 1988
- Empria gussakovskii Dovnar-Zapolskij, 1929
- Empria honshuana Prous & Heidemaa, 2011
- Empria hungarica (Konow, 1895)
- Empria ignota
- Empria immersa (Klug, 1818)
- Empria improba (Cresson, 1880) Le Peletier & Audinet-Serville, 1828
- Empria japonica Heidemaa & Prous, 2011
- Empria konowi Dovnar-Zapolskij, 1929
- Empria liturata (Gmelin, 1790)
- Empria loktini Ermolenko, 1971
- Empria longicornis (Thomson, 1871)
- Empria lycroi Prous & Park, 2019
- Empria maculata
- Empria magnicornis (Eversmann, 1864)
- Empria minuta Lindqvist, 1968
- Empria mongolica (Konow, 1895)
- Empria multicolor
- Empria nigroterga Park & Lee, 2019
- Empria obscurata
- Empria pallimacula (Serville, 1823)
- Empria parvula (Konow, 1892)
- Empria persephone Benson, 1954
- Empria plana (Jakowlew, 1891)
- Empria pravei Dovnar-Zapolskij, 1925
- Empria pumila (Konow, 1896)
- Empria pumiloides Lindqvist, 1968
- Empria quadrimaculata Takeuchi, 1952
- Empria rubicola Ermolenko, 1971
- Empria sammuti Nel et al., 2022
- Empria sexpunctata (Serville, 1823)
- Empria takeuchii Prous & Heidemaa, 2011
- Empria testaceipes (Konow, 1896)
- Empria tridens (Konow, 1896)
- Empria tridentis Lee & Ryu, 1996
- Empria ushinskii Dovnar-Zapolskij, 1929
- Empria wui Wei & Nie, 1998
- Empria zhangi Wei & Yan, 2009
- Leucempria oligocaenica (Meunier, 1923)
- BOLD:AAG3529 (Empria sp.)
- BOLD:AAG3534 (Empria sp.)
- BOLD:AAI9241 (Empria sp.)
- BOLD:AAU1361 (Empria sp.)
- BOLD:AAU1362 (Empria sp.)
- BOLD:ABY6236 (Empria sp.)
- BOLD:ABY6237 (Empria sp.)
- BOLD:ABZ3145 (Empria sp.)
- BOLD:ABZ7186 (Empria sp.)
- BOLD:ACD5802 (Empria sp.)
- BOLD:ACF1903 (Empria sp.)
- BOLD:ACM0742 (Empria sp.)
- BOLD:ACM5262 (Empria sp.)
- BOLD:ACM5263 (Empria sp.)
- BOLD:ACM6100 (Empria sp.)
- BOLD:ACM6307 (Empria sp.)
- BOLD:ACX0856 (Empria sp.)
- BOLD:ACX2231 (Empria sp.)
- BOLD:ADC7702 (Empria sp.)
- BOLD:AEA5979 (Empria sp.)
