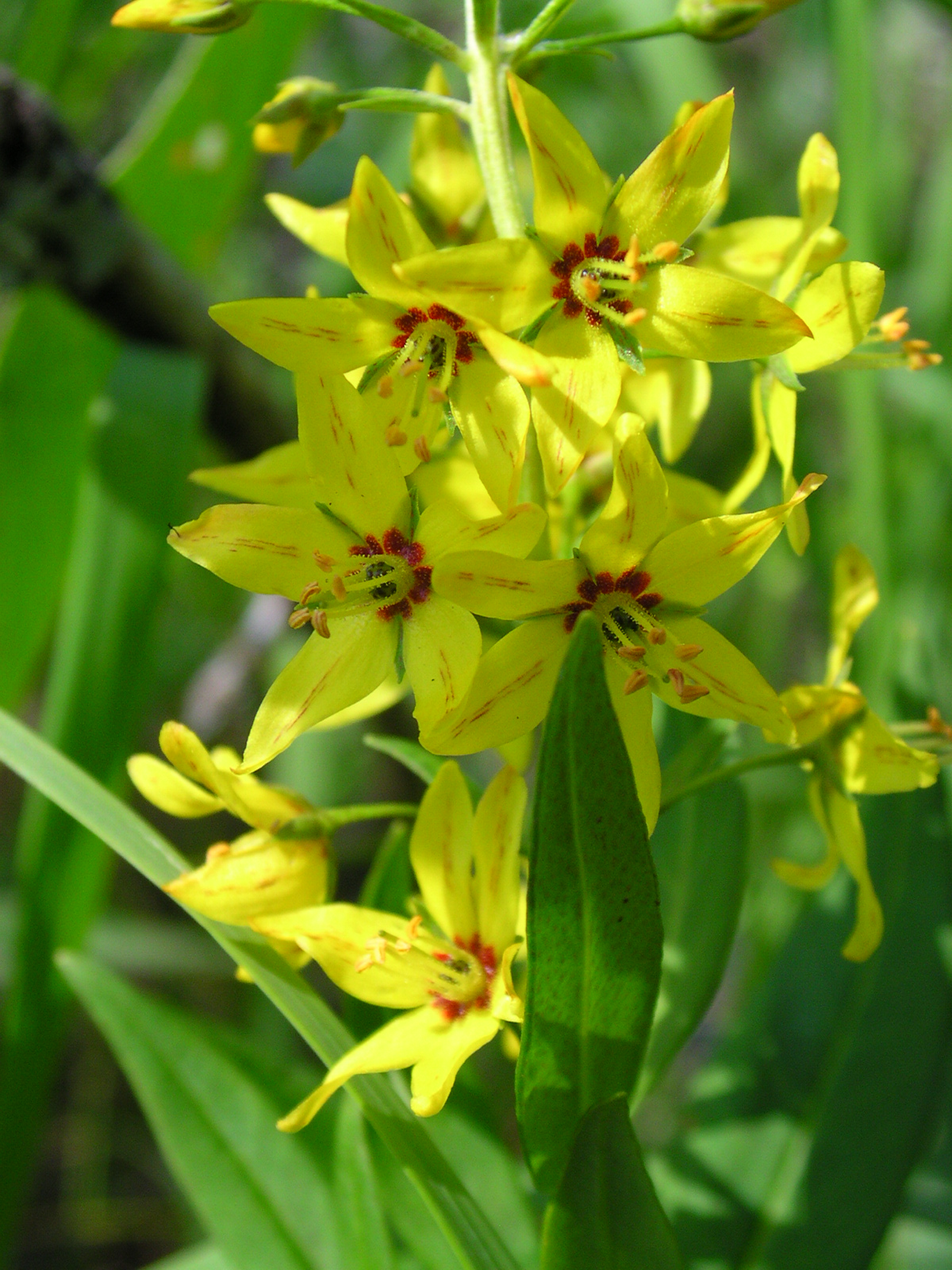

Scientific classification
- Kingdom: Plantae
- Clade: Tracheophytes
- Clade: Angiosperms
- Clade: Eudicots
- Clade: Asterids
- Order: Ericales
- Family: Primulaceae
- Genus: Lysimachia
- Species: L. terrestris

Binomial name
- Lysimachia terrestris (L.) Britton, Sterns & Poggenb.

Synonyms
- Lysimachia stricta Aiton; Viscum terrestre L.

= Lysimachia terrestris =

Species of flowering plant

Lysimachia terrestris (swamp candles, lake loosestrife or earth loosestrife) is a plant in the family Primulaceae.

== Description ==
Lysimachia terrestris is a herbaceous plant with opposite, simple leaves, and erect stems. The flowers are produced in a raceme, 10–30 cm (4–12 in) long, at the top of the plant. The flowers are star-shaped with five yellow petals, and appear in mid-summer. Each petal has two red dots at its base forming a circle of ten red dots in the center of the flower. Late in the summer, reddish bulblets form in the leaf axils. They resemble caterpillars and may be mistaken for fruit.

== Ecology and distribution ==
Lysimachia terrestris grows in swamps and at the edges of ponds and lakes in the Eastern United States and in Eastern Canada. It is also found in the U.S. states of Oregon, Washington, and Idaho, and in British Columbia. It is listed as endangered in Tennessee and Kentucky.

A major pest is Monostegia abdominalis, a sawfly whose larvae can completely skeletonize the leaves.

Gallery
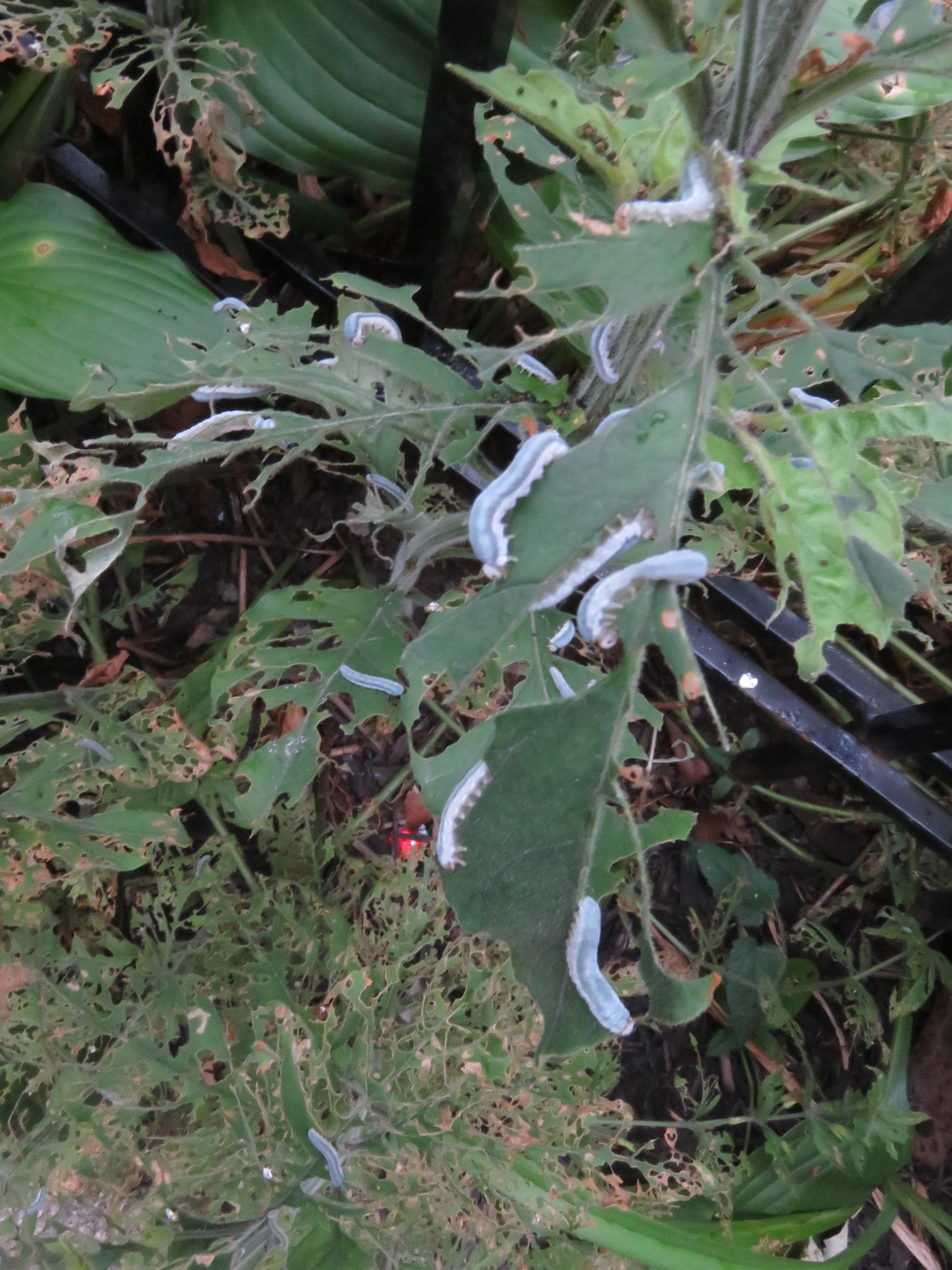
Larvae of Monostegia abdominalis

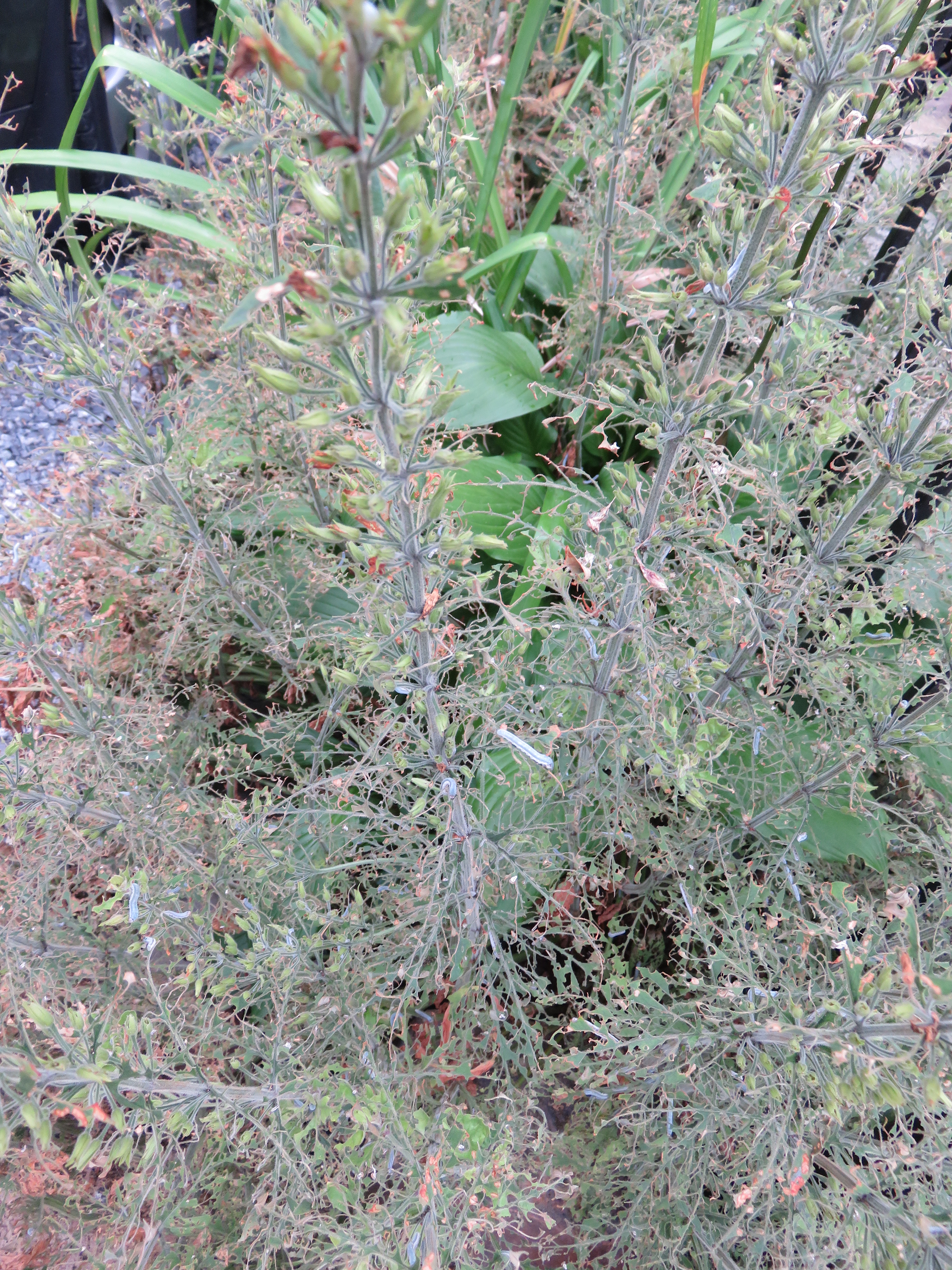
Leaves skeletonized by larvae

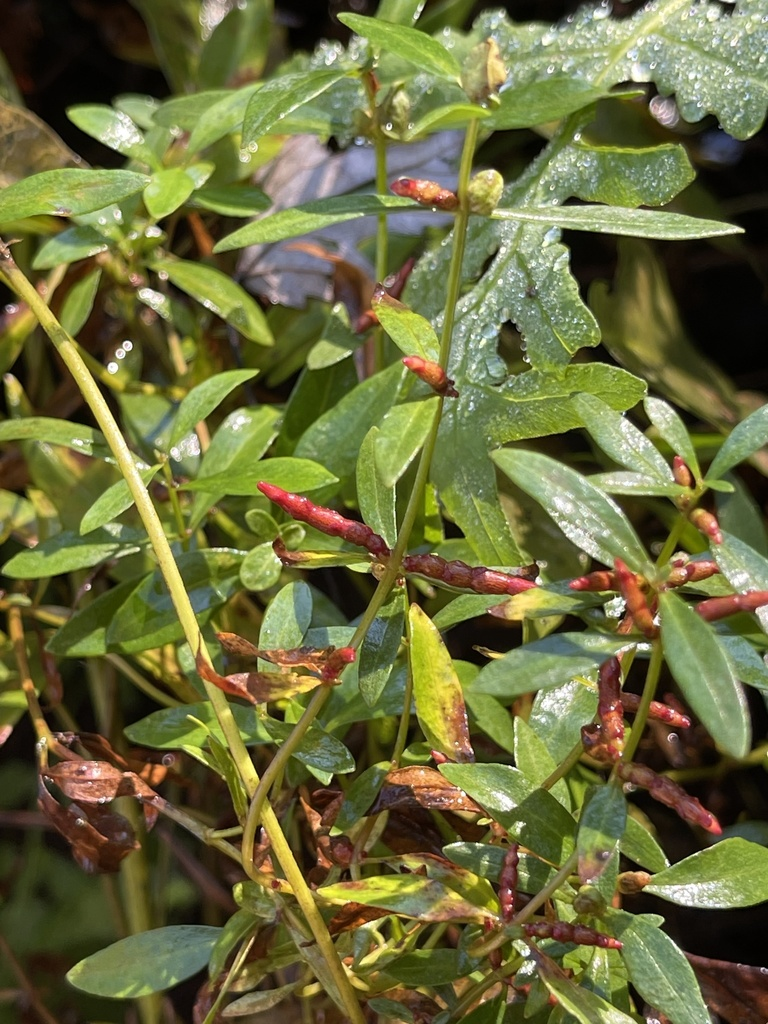
Example of red axillary bulblets, observed in late September
